= 2026 Men's T20 World Cup East Asia-Pacific Sub-regional Qualifier =

Qualification tournament for the 2028 T20 World Cup in EAP region

2026 ICC Men's T20 World Cup East Asia–Pacific Sub–regional Qualifier
- Dates: 8 – 18 May 2026
- Administrator: ICC East Asia-Pacific
- Cricket format: Twenty20 International
- Tournament format(s): Group stage and Super 6s in round–robin
- Host: Japan
- Champions: Papua New Guinea
- Runners-up: Japan
- Participants: 9
- Matches: 21
- Most runs: (Samoa) Darius Visser (267)
- Most wickets: (Vanuatu) Joshua Rasu (15)

The 2026 Men's T20 World Cup East Asia–Pacific (EAP) Sub–regional Qualifier was a cricket tournament that formed part of the qualification process for the 2028 Men's T20 World Cup. It was hosted by Japan in May 2026.

The nine participating teams were split into three groups of three, with the top two sides from each group advancing to the Super six stage. The top four teams from the Super six stage advanced to the regional final.

The three teams eliminated after the group stage contested a tri-series.

== Venues ==
The following venues were confirmed for the tournament:

Sano, Tochigi	2026 Men's T20 World Cup East Asia-Pacific Sub-regional Qualifier (Japan)	Nisshin, Aichi
Sano International Cricket Ground	2026 Men's T20 World Cup East Asia-Pacific Sub-regional Qualifier (Japan)	Kōrogi Sports Park
Capacity: 2,000	2026 Men's T20 World Cup East Asia-Pacific Sub-regional Qualifier (Japan)	Capacity: 300
Matches: 21 (Note: Included matches played at Sano International Cricket Ground 2.)	2026 Men's T20 World Cup East Asia-Pacific Sub-regional Qualifier (Japan)	Matches: 6

== Squads ==
Cook Islands	Fiji	Indonesia	Japan	Papua New Guinea
Ma'ara Ave (c, wk); Cory Dickson (vc); Paul Cummings; Hayden Dickson; Luca Grace; Aue Parima (wk); Thomas Parima; James Pickering (wk); Teaute Ravarua; Adison Rowe; Jeremiah Shields; Quin Stephens; Oscar Taylor; Jared Tutty	Seru Tupou (c); Noa Acawei; Josaia Baleicikobia; Metuisela Beitaki (wk); Peni Dakainivanua; Ledua Gauna; Taleivuli Jikoibure; Manase Ravula; Siteri Tabuisulu; Kitione Tayaga; Vilisoni Veiqravi; Peni Vuniwaqa; Savenaca Waqabaca; Viliame Waqavakatoga	Danilson Hawoe (c); Gede Arta; Ketut Artawan; Ferdinando Banunaek; Kavin Chaddha; Kadek Gamantika; Sudhakar Jegannathan; Dharma Kesuma (wk); Sampath Kharvi; Gede Priandana; Apriliandi Rahayu; Dhanesh Shetty; Anjar Tadarus; Gaurav Tiwari; Yudha Verdian	Kendel Kadowaki-Fleming (c); Abhishek Anand; Charlie Hara-Hinze; Benjamin Ito-Davis; Wataru Miyauchi (wk); Esam Rahman; Sabaorish Ravichandran; Reo Sakurano-Thomas; Abdul Samad; Alex Shirai-Patmore (wk); Shoma Sugaya-Slater; Declan Suzuki; Ibrahim Takahashi; Makoto Taniyama	Assad Vala (c); Ryan Ani; Sese Bau; Michael Charlie; Gaba Frank; John Kariko; Kabua Morea; Alei Nao; Patrick Nou; Aue Oru; Boio Ray; Lega Siaka; Tony Ura (wk); Hila Vare
Philippines	Samoa	South Korea	Vanuatu	
Henry Tyler (c, wk); Rhys Burinaga; Gurbhupinder Chohan; Josef Doctora; Andrew Donovan; Huzaifa Mohammed; Arashdeep Samra; Kulwinderjeet Singh; Surinder Singh; Amanpreet Sirah; Daniel Smith; Christopher Stamp (wk); Nivek Tanner; Jonathon Tuffin	Sean Solia (c); Daniel Burgess; Sean Cotter; Samuel French (wk); Caleb Jasmat; Maletino Maiava; Benjamin Mailata; Noah Mead; Solomon Nash; Samson Sola; Fereti Sululoto (wk); Saumani Tiai; Ili Tugaga; Darius Visser	Balage Dilruksha (c, wk); Sageer Ahmad; Aiden Broomfield; Kuldeep Gurjar; Jun Hyunwoo (wk); Areeb Khalid; Aamir Lal; Daham Madampage; Sameera Maduranga; Nadeem Muhammad; Alex Parsons; Hyeon Parsons; Sameera Pitabeddara; Chamith Ranasinghe	Joshua Rasu (c); Jarryd Allan (wk); Ala Viraliliu (wk); Tim Cutler; Rodrick Lekai; Andrew Mansale; Patrick Matautaava; Williamsing Nalisa; Nalin Nipiko; Clement Tommy (wk); Nicholas Venables; Junior Kaltapau; Darren Wotu; Womejo Wotu	

== Group stage ==
=== Group 1 ===
==== Points table ====
Group 1 standings
Pos	Team	Pld	W	L	NR	Pts	NRR	Qualification
1	Japan (H)	2	2	0	0	4	3.113	Advanced to the Super six
2	Vanuatu	2	1	1	0	2	2.275	Advanced to the Super six
3	Fiji	2	0	2	0	0	−5.932	Eliminated

Source: ESPNcricinfo
(H) Host

==== Fixtures ====
8 May 2026
09:30
Scorecard

Vanuatu; 169/4 (20 overs)	v	Fiji; 48 (14.4 overs)
Joshua Rasu 59 (49); Josaia Baleicikobia 2/29 (3 overs)		Noa Acawei 13 (13); Williamsing Nalisa 3/6 (3.4 overs)

Vanuatu won by 121 runs
Kōrogi Sports Park, Nisshin
Umpires: Viswanadan Kalidas (Mas) and Donovan Koch (Aus)
Player of the match: Joshua Rasu (Van)

- Vanuatu won the toss and elected to bat.
- Kitione Tayaga, Vilisoni Veiqravi, Savenaca Waqabaca, Viliame Waqavakatoga (Fij) and Nicholas Venables (Van) all made their T20I debuts.

9 May 2026
09:30
Scorecard

Japan; 123 (19.4 overs)	v	Vanuatu; 93/6 (20 overs)
Esam Rahman 30 (36); Joshua Rasu 4/24 (4 overs)		Junior Kaltapau 37* (38); Abdul Samad 2/4 (4 overs)

Japan won by 30 runs
Kōrogi Sports Park, Nisshin
Umpires: Phillip Gillespie (Aus) and Suresh Subramanian (Idn)
Player of the match: Joshua Rasu (Van)

- Japan won the toss and elected to bat.

10 May 2026
09:30
Scorecard

Fiji; 74 (19.4 overs)	v	Japan; 75/2 (7.1 overs)
Josaia Baleicikobia 39 (57); Ibrahim Takahashi 3/4 (1.4 overs)		Esam Rahman 47* (26); Serou Tupou 1/16 (2 overs)

Japan won by 8 wickets
Kōrogi Sports Park, Nisshin
Umpires: Donovan Koch (Aus) and Suresh Subramanian (Idn)
Player of the match: Esam Rahman (Jpn)

- Fiji won the toss and elected to bat.
- Taleivuli Jikoibure (Fij) made his T20I debut.

=== Group 2 ===
==== Points table ====
Group 2 standings
Pos	Team	Pld	W	L	NR	Pts	NRR	Qualification
1	Samoa	2	2	0	0	4	4.780	Advanced to the Super six
2	Indonesia	2	1	1	0	2	−1.695	Advanced to the Super six
3	Philippines	2	0	2	0	0	−2.675	Eliminated

Source: ESPNcricinfo

==== Fixtures ====
8 May 2026
09:30
Scorecard

Indonesia; 132/9 (20 overs)	v	Philippines; 121/6 (20 overs)
Kadek Gamantika 45 (35); Jonathon Tuffin 2/17 (4 overs)		Henry Tyler 42* (26); Kadek Gamantika 2/17 (4 overs)

Indonesia won by 11 runs
Sano International Cricket Ground, Sano
Umpires: Cory Black (NZ) and Chris Thurgate (Jpn)
Player of the match: Kadek Gamantika (Idn)

- Philippines won the toss and elected to field.
- Yudha Verdian (Idn) made his T20I debut.

9 May 2026
09:30
Scorecard

Indonesia; 92/8 (20 overs)	v	Samoa; 93/1 (9.2 overs)
Kavin Chaddha 25 (33); Solomon Nash 3/6 (4 overs)		Darius Visser 58 (26); Kadek Gamantika 1/10 (1.2 overs)

Samoa won by 9 wickets
Sano International Cricket Ground, Sano
Umpires: Cory Black (NZ) and Wayne Knights (NZ)
Player of the match: Solomon Nash (Sam)

- Samoa won the toss and elected to field.

10 May 2026
09:30
Scorecard

Samoa; 166/7 (20 overs)	v	Philippines; 70 (14.4 overs)
Sean Solia 74 (56); Amanpreet Sirah 2/31 (4 overs)		Andrew Donovan 25 (25); Solomon Nash 4/12 (3 overs)

Samoa won by 96 runs
Sano International Cricket Ground, Sano
Umpires: Cory Black (NZ) and Wayne Knights (NZ)
Player of the match: Sean Solia (Sam)

- Samoa won the toss and elected to bat.

=== Group 3 ===
==== Points table ====
Group 3 standings
Pos	Team	Pld	W	L	NR	Pts	NRR	Qualification
1	Papua New Guinea	2	2	0	0	4	4.625	Advanced to the Super six
2	Cook Islands	2	1	1	0	2	1.995	Advanced to the Super six
3	South Korea	2	0	2	0	0	−7.273	Eliminated

Source: ESPNcricinfo

==== Fixtures ====
8 May 2026
14:00
Scorecard

South Korea; 47 (16.2 overs)	v	Cook Islands; 49/1 (4.4 overs)
Sageer Ahmad 20 (30); Quin Stephens 3/4 (3 overs)		Thomas Parima 21* (10); Nadeem Muhammad 1/10 (1 over)

Cook Islands won by 9 wickets
Kōrogi Sports Park, Nisshin
Umpires: Tabarak Dar (HK) and Phillip Gillespie (Aus)
Player of the match: Quin Stephens (Cok)

- Cook Islands won the toss and elected to field.
- Luca Grace, Jeremiah Shields, Quin Stephens (Cok), Sageer Ahmad, Aiden Broomfield, Muhammad Nadeem and Chamith Ranasinghe (Kor) all made their T20I debuts.

9 May 2026
14:00
Scorecard

Papua New Guinea; 197/3 (20 overs)	v	South Korea; 61 (19.4 overs)
Tony Ura 106* (55); Daham Madampage 1/14 (2 overs)		Daham Madampage 16 (30); Aue Oru 4/11 (4 overs)

Papua New Guinea won by 136 runs
Kōrogi Sports Park, Nisshin
Umpires: Tabarak Dar (HK) and Donovan Koch (Aus)
Player of the match: Tony Ura (PNG)

- Papua New Guinea won the toss and elected to bat.
- Ryan Ani and Aue Oru (PNG) both made their T20I debuts.

10 May 2026
14:00
Scorecard

Papua New Guinea; 204/5 (20 overs)	v	Cook Islands; 155/6 (20 overs)
Lega Siaka 80* (50); Cory Dickson 2/29 (4 overs)		Hayden Dickson 50 (32); Sese Bau 2/22 (3 overs)

Papua New Guinea won by 49 runs
Kōrogi Sports Park, Nisshin
Umpires: Phillip Gillespie (Aus) and Viswanadan Kalidas (Mas)
Player of the match: Lega Siaka (PNG)

- Papua New Guinea won the toss and elected to bat.

== Super six ==
=== Points table ===
Super six standings
Pos	Team	Pld	W	L	NR	Pts	NRR	Qualification
1	Papua New Guinea	5	4	1	0	8	2.110	Advanced to the regional final
2	Japan (H)	5	4	1	0	8	1.481	Advanced to the regional final
3	Samoa	5	3	2	0	6	1.117	Advanced to the regional final
4	Cook Islands	5	3	2	0	6	−0.509	Advanced to the regional final
5	Vanuatu	5	1	4	0	2	−2.553	Eliminated
6	Indonesia	5	0	5	0	0	−2.139	Eliminated

Source: ESPNcricinfo
(H) Host

=== Fixtures ===
12 May 2026
09:30
Scorecard

Vanuatu; 129/8 (20 overs)	v	Samoa; 132/1 (15.3 overs)
Junior Kaltapau 37* (23); Saumani Tiai 4/25 (4 overs)		Darius Visser 75* (51); Joshua Rasu 1/24 (4 overs)

Samoa won by 9 wickets
Sano International Cricket Ground, Sano
Umpires: Phillip Gillespie (Aus) and Suresh Subramanian (Idn)
Player of the match: Darius Visser (Sam)

- Vanuatu won the toss and elected to bat.

12 May 2026
14:00
Scorecard

Japan; 142/7 (20 overs)	v	Indonesia; 101 (19.1 overs)
Alex Shirai-Patmore 52 (49); Ferdinando Banunaek 2/17 (3 overs)		Kadek Gamantika 33 (27); Makoto Taniyama 2/11 (1.1 overs)

Japan won by 41 runs
Sano International Cricket Ground, Sano
Umpires: Tabarak Dar (HK) and Wayne Knights (NZ)
Player of the match: Alex Shirai-Patmore (Jpn)

- Japan won the toss and elected to bat.

13 May 2026
09:30
Scorecard

Samoa; 112 (20 overs)	v	Papua New Guinea; 115/8 (20 overs)
Darius Visser 31 (24); John Kariko 3/15 (4 overs)		Assad Vala 26 (22); Saumani Tiai 4/22 (4 overs)

Papua New Guinea won by 2 wickets
Sano International Cricket Ground, Sano
Umpires: Tabarak Dar (HK) and Donovan Koch (Aus)
Player of the match: Alei Nao (PNG)

- Samoa won the toss and elected to bat.

13 May 2026
14:00
Scorecard

Cook Islands; 163/7 (20 overs)	v	Vanuatu; 69/5 (8 overs)
Aue Parima 64 (45); Tim Cutler 2/19 (4 overs)		Joshua Rasu 22 (15); Jared Tutty 2/8 (2 overs)

Cook Islands won by 11 runs (DLS method)
Sano International Cricket Ground, Sano
Umpires: Viswanadan Kalidas (Mas) and Wayne Knights (NZ)
Player of the match: Hayden Dickson (Cok)

- Cook Islands won the toss and elected to bat.
- Vanuatu were set a revised target of 81 runs from 8 overs due to rain.

14 May 2026
09:30
Scorecard

Papua New Guinea; 130/7 (20 overs)	v	Indonesia; 92 (19 overs)
Assad Vala 34 (33); Sudhakar Jegannathan 2/14 (4 overs)		Kavin Chaddha 30 (32); Aue Oru 4/13 (3 overs)

Papua New Guinea won by 38 runs
Sano International Cricket Ground, Sano
Umpires: Suresh Subramanian (Idn) and Viswanadan Kalidas (Mas)
Player of the match: Assad Vala (PNG)

- Papua New Guinea won the toss and elected to bat.

14 May 2026
14:00
Scorecard

Japan; 90 (18.5 overs)	v	Cook Islands; 94/7 (20 overs)
Reo Sakurano-Thomas 19 (17); Ma'ara Ave 3/4 (2 overs)		Thomas Parima 48* (49); Charlie Hara-Hinze 3/7 (4 overs)

Cook Islands won by 3 wickets
Sano International Cricket Ground, Sano
Umpires: Tabarak Dar (HK) and Phillip Gillespie (Aus)
Player of the match: Thomas Parima (Cok)

- Japan won the toss and elected to bat.

16 May 2026
09:30
Scorecard

Vanuatu; 102/9 (20 overs)	v	Indonesia; 101/9 (20 overs)
Clement Tommy 27 (20); Kavin Chaddha 3/13 (4 overs)		Sudhakar Jegannathan 38 (50); Joshua Rasu 4/32 (4 overs)

Vanuatu won by 1 run
Sano International Cricket Ground, Sano
Umpires: Wayne Knights (NZ) and Suresh Subramanian (Idn)
Player of the match: Joshua Rasu (Van)

- Indonesia won the toss and elected to field.

16 May 2026
14:00
Scorecard

Samoa; 81 (18.5 overs)	v	Japan; 82/1 (11.1 overs)
Darius Visser 42 (48); Sabaorish Ravichandran 5/11 (4 overs)		Kendel Kadowaki-Fleming 37* (34); Darius Visser 1/21 (2.1 overs)

Japan won by 9 wickets
Sano International Cricket Ground, Sano
Umpires: Donovan Koch (Aus) and Viswanadan Kalidas (Mas)
Player of the match: Sabaorish Ravichandran (Jpn)

- Samoa won the toss and elected to bat.

17 May 2026
09:30
Scorecard

Cook Islands; 128/6 (16 overs)	v	Indonesia; 78/6 (16 overs)
Ma'ara Ave 56 (34); Sudhakar Jegannathan 2/15 (4 overs)		Kavin Chaddha 45 (52); Cory Dickson 2/16 (3 overs)

Cook Islands won by 50 runs
Sano International Cricket Ground, Sano
Umpires: Donovan Koch (Aus) and Phillip Gillespie (Aus)
Player of the match: Ma'ara Ave (Cok)

- Indonesia won the toss and elected to field.
- The match was reduced to 16 overs per side due to rain.
- Paul Cummings (Cok) made his T20I debut.

17 May 2026
14:00
Scorecard

Papua New Guinea; 207/5 (20 overs)	v	Vanuatu; 60 (14.2 overs)
Lega Siaka 85 (46); Joshua Rasu 2/39 (4 overs)		Clement Tommy 19 (19); Sese Bau 3/6 (2.2 overs)

Papua New Guinea won by 147 runs
Sano International Cricket Ground, Sano
Umpires: Tabarak Dar (HK) and Viswanadan Kalidas (Mas)
Player of the match: Lega Siaka (PNG)

- Papua New Guinea won the toss and elected to bat.
- Gaba Frank (PNG) and Roderick Lekai (Van) both made their T20I debuts.

18 May 2026
09:30
Scorecard

Cook Islands; 75 (19.1 overs)	v	Samoa; 79/1 (11.2 overs)
Aue Parima 24 (18); Samson Sola 3/20 (4 overs)		Benjamin Mailata 30* (27)

Samoa won by 9 wickets
Sano International Cricket Ground, Sano
Umpires: Phillip Gillespie (Aus) and Wayne Knights (NZ)
Player of the match: Darius Visser (Sam)

- Samoa won the toss and elected to field.

18 May 2026
14:00
Scorecard

Japan; 121/7 (20 overs)	v	Papua New Guinea; 95/8 (20 overs)
Kendel Kadowaki-Fleming 45 (33); Sese Bau 3/24 (4 overs)		Lega Siaka 22 (36); Charlie Hara-Hinze 2/18 (4 overs)

Japan won by 26 runs
Sano International Cricket Ground, Sano
Umpires: Donovan Koch (Aus) and Suresh Subramanian (Idn)
Player of the match: Kendel Kadowaki-Fleming (Jpn)

- Japan won the toss and elected to bat.

== Tri-nation series ==
2026 Japan Tri-Nation Series
- Date: 12–18 May 2026
- Result: South Korea won the tournament
- Matches: 6
Teams
Fiji	Philippines	South Korea
Captains
Seru Tupou	Henry Tyler	Balage Dilruksha
Most runs
Peni Vuniwaqa (108)	Andrew Donovan (114)	Sageer Ahmad (142)
Most wickets
Seru Tupou (4)	Amanpreet Sirah (11)	Hyeon Parsons (6)

=== Points table ===
Pos	Team	Pld	W	L	NR	Pts	NRR
1	South Korea	4	3	1	0	6	1.105
2	Philippines	4	3	1	0	6	0.319
3	Fiji	4	0	4	0	0	−1.440

Source: ESPNcricinfo

=== Fixtures ===
12 May 2026
14:30
Scorecard

Philippines; 163/4 (20 overs)	v	South Korea; 140/8 (20 overs)
Nivek Tanner 60* (41); Daham Madampage 2/32 (4 overs)		Sageer Ahmad 43 (32); Amanpreet Sirah 3/14 (4 overs)

Philippines won by 23 runs
Sano International Cricket Ground 2, Sano
Umpires: Dhakshinamoorthy Natarajan (Jpn) and Chris Thurgate (Jpn)
Player of the match: Amanpreet Sirah (Phi)

- Philippines won the toss and elected to bat.

13 May 2026
10:00
Scorecard

Fiji; 140 (19.5 overs)	v	South Korea; 141/4 (18 overs)
Peni Vuniwaqa 59 (44); Hyeon Parsons 6/31 (3.5 overs)		Sageer Ahmad 37 (31); Peni Vuniwaqa 2/29 (4 overs)

South Korea won by 6 wickets
Sano International Cricket Ground 2, Sano
Umpires: Dhakshinamoorthy Natarajan (Jpn) and Suresh Subramanian (Idn)
Player of the match: Hyeon Parsons (Kor)

- Fiji won the toss and elected to bat.
- Hyeon Parsons became the first player for South Korea to take a five-wicket haul in men's T20Is.

14 May 2026
10:00
Scorecard

Fiji; 116 (18.4 overs)	v	Philippines; 117/6 (18.2 overs)
Peni Vuniwaqa 42 (31); Amanpreet Sirah 4/14 (3.4 overs)		Josef Doctora 42* (33); Seru Tupou 2/29 (4 overs)

Philippines won by 4 wickets
Sano International Cricket Ground 2, Sano
Umpires: Dhakshinamoorthy Natarajan (Jpn) and Donovan Koch (Aus)
Player of the match: Amanpreet Sirah (Phi)

- Fiji won the toss and elected to bat.
- Manase Ravula (Fij) made his T20I debut.

16 May 2026
14:30
Scorecard

Philippines; 94/8 (20 overs)	v	South Korea; 95/2 (13.2 overs)
Henry Tyler 46* (47); Kuldeep Gurjar 2/9 (4 overs)		Sageer Ahmad 56 (39); Surinder Singh 1/1 (1 over)

South Korea won by 8 wickets
Sano International Cricket Ground 2, Sano
Umpires: Phillip Gillespie (Aus) and Rob Newman (Jpn)
Player of the match: Sageer Ahmad (Kor)

- Philippines won the toss and elected to bat.

17 May 2026
10:00
Scorecard

Fiji; 107/7 (20 overs)	v	South Korea; 109/3 (14.1 overs)
Manase Ravula 47* (45); Sameera Maduranga 3/18 (4 overs)		Balage Dilruksha 62* (49); Savenaca Waqabaca 2/19 (3 overs)

South Korea won by 7 wickets
Sano International Cricket Ground 2, Sano
Umpires: Wayne Knights (NZ) and Vipin Sukhwal (Jpn)
Player of the match: Balage Dilruksha (Kor)

- South Korea won the toss and elected to field.

18 May 2026
14:30
Scorecard

Fiji; 136 (20 overs)	v	Philippines; 141/1 (15.4 overs)
Manase Ravula 40 (39); Daniel Smith 4/20 (4 overs)		Andrew Donovan 81* (56); Siteri Tabuisulu 1/19 (3 overs)

Philippines won by 9 wickets
Sano International Cricket Ground 2, Sano
Umpires: Mumtaz Alam (Jpn) and Tabarak Dar (HK)
Player of the match: Andrew Donovan (Phi)

- Fiji won the toss and elected to bat.

== Team of the tournament ==
- (Samoa) Darius Visser
- (Papua New Guinea) Tony Ura
- (Samoa) Sean Solia (c)
- (Papua New Guinea) Lega Siaka
- (Cook Islands) Hayden Dickson
- (Vanuatu) Joshua Rasu
- (Papua New Guinea) Sese Bau
- (Japan) Sabaorish Ravichandran
- (Japan) Alex Shirai-Patmore (wk)
- (Samoa) Saumani Tiai
- (Papua New Guinea) John Kariko
- (Indonesia) Kavin Chaddha (12th man)
