= Indian cricket team in Japan in 2026 =

International cricket tour

	Japan	India
- Dates: 22 September 2026
Captains	Kendel Kadowaki-Fleming	Shreyas Iyer

Twenty20 International series
- Results: India won the 1-match series 1–0
Most runs	Kendel Kadowaki-Fleming (12)	Shreyas Iyer (16)
Most wickets	Charlie Hara-Hinze (2)	Washington Sundar (2)

The Indian cricket team toured Japan in September 2026 to play the Japan cricket team as part of the 'Sport 75' initiative, commemorating the 75th anniversary of India–Japan relations. The tour consisted of a one-off Twenty20 International (T20I) match.

The series formed part of both teams' preparation ahead of the 2026 Asian Games. In September 2026, the Board for Control of Cricket in India (BCCI) and Japan Cricket Association (JCA) confirmed the fixture as part of the Suzuki Cup. It was the first-ever international match between the two sides.

== Squads ==
Japan	India
Kendel Kadowaki-Fleming (c); Charlie Hara-Hinze; Benjamin Ito-Davis; Alester Kadowaki-Fleming; Kohei Kubota; Jake Kusuda-Nairn; Wataru Miyauchi (wk); Reo Sakurano-Thomas; Alex Shirai-Patmore (wk); Shoma Sugaya-Slater; Declan Suzuki; Tsuyoshi Takada; Ibrahim Takahashi; Makoto Taniyama; Lachlan Yamamoto-Lake	Shreyas Iyer (c); Tilak Varma (vc); Ravi Bishnoi; Jasprit Bumrah; ~~Varun Chakravarthy~~; Shivam Dube; Ishan Kishan (wk); Vipraj Nigam; Axar Patel; Sanju Samson (wk); Abhishek Sharma; Arshdeep Singh; Vaibhav Sooryavanshi; Washington Sundar; Yash Thakur

On 16 September 2026, Varun Chakravarthy was ruled out due to side strain and was replaced by Vipraj Nigam.

== Only T20I ==
22 September 2026
13:00
Scorecard

India; 32/4 (5 overs)	v	Japan; 30/3 (5 overs)
Shreyas Iyer 16 (12); Charlie Hara-Hinze 2/17 (2 overs)		Kendel Kadowaki-Fleming 12 (12); Washington Sundar 2/13 (2 overs)

India won by 2 runs
Sano International Cricket Ground, Sano
Umpires: Chris Brown (NZ) and Chris Thurgate (Jpn)
Player of the match: Shreyas Iyer (Ind)

- India won the toss and elected to bat.
- The match was reduced to 5 overs per side due to wet outfield.
- This was the first time India and Japan faced each other in T20Is.
- India become the first team to register 200 wins in T20Is.

== Broadcasting ==
In India, the match was broadcast on television by Star Sports and streamed on FanCode. The global production, broadcast distribution and commercial marketing rights for the fixture were held by ITW Universe.
