= Ibrahim Takahashi =

Japanese cricketer

Personal information
- Born: 28 November 1998 (age 27); Gotemba, Shizuoka Prefecture, Japan
- Nickname: Ibby
- Batting: Right-handed
- Bowling: Right-arm off break
- Role: All-rounder

International information
- National side: Japan (2022–present)
- T20I debut (cap 9): 9 October 2022 v Indonesia
- Last T20I: 26 September 2026 v Nepal

Career statistics
Competition	T20I
Matches	60
Runs scored	695
Batting average	15.79
100s/50s	0/1
Top score	54*
Balls bowled	937
Wickets	52
Bowling average	17.30
5 wickets in innings	0
10 wickets in match	0
Best bowling	3/4
Catches/stumpings	16/-
- Source: ESPNcricinfo, 4 October 2026

Ibrahim Takahashi (born 28 November 1998), is a Japanese cricketer who plays for the Japan national cricket team as an all-rounder. He plays club cricket for East Kanto Sunrisers Cricket Club in the Japan Premier League.

== Early life and education ==
Takahashi was born on 28 November 1998 in Gotemba, Shizuoka Prefecture to a Pakistani father and a Japanese mother. He spent the first eight years of his life in Japan before moving to Pakistan. It was here that he was introduced to cricket, where he played with his cousins.

Growing up, he idolised Shoaib Akhtar. He also played for a local team in Pakistan, but eventually had to shift his focus to studies as he pursued education in IT and Visual Communication. He holds a diploma in Information Technology and a diploma in Graphic Design from TAFE Queensland. He also studied Digital Marketing through an open university.

== Personal life ==
Takahashi moved to Australia where he met his wife, who is also of Pakistani descent. He currently lives in Brisbane where he also works as a swimming instructor and disability care team leader. He also freelances as a graphic designer.

== Domestic career ==
Takahashi returned to Japan in 2018. During the COVID-19 lockdown, he began playing in the Japanese domestic circuit, joining the Chiba Sharks Club.

He also played club cricket in Australia, which contributed to the improvement of his skills. He represented Western Suburbs' third-grade side from 2023 to 2024 before joining the Bengal Warriors for the 2025–26 season. He most recently represented Northern Suburbs' second-grade side.

He was also part of the Kandy Falcons setup during the 2024 Lanka Premier League, as part of a memorandum of understanding between the cricket boards of Japan and Sri Lanka. The arrangement provided him with valuable training and opportunities.

== International career ==
Before making appearance for the Japanese senior side, Takahashi also participated in age-level cricket in the country. He also captained the Japan's youth side in an international tournament.

In September 2022, he was named in Japan's squad for Japan's home series against Indonesia which was also their first-ever T20I. He made his Twenty20 International (T20I) debut in the first match against Indonesia on 9 October 2022. He finished the series with 40 runs and 4 wickets.

He was named in Japan's squad for the 2022–23 ICC Men's T20 World Cup East Asia-Pacific Qualifier, which turned out to be a disappointing campaign, where he scored 16 runs and took two wickets in four matches. He was subsequently named in Japan's squad for the 2024 EAP qualifier and the 2026 EAP qualifier. He was also part of Japan's squad for the 2022 Asian Games.

In September 2026, he was named for the historic one-off T20I against India. He dismissed Sanju Samson on his second delivery for just nine runs.

Following this series, he also took part in the 2026 Asian Games. He became the second highest wicket-taker for the team and second Japanese player to take 50 wickets in T20Is.
