= Indonesian cricket team in Japan in 2022–23 =

International cricket tour

Indonesian cricket team in Japan in 2022
	Japan	Indonesia
- Dates: 9 – 11 October 2022
Captains	Kendel Kadowaki-Fleming	Kadek Gamantika

Twenty20 International series
- Results: Japan won the 3-match series 2–1
Most runs	Kendel Kadowaki-Fleming (98)	Gede Priandana (66)
Most wickets	Reo Sakurano-Thomas (6)	Ketut Artawan (7)
- Player of the series: Reo Sakurano-Thomas (Jpn)

The Indonesia cricket team toured Japan in October 2022 to play a three-match Twenty20 International (T20I) bilateral series at the Sano International Cricket Ground in Sano against the hosts Japan. The first match of the series was both sides' first official T20I match since the ICC announced that all matches between member nations would be eligible for this status. The series helped both teams prepare for the T20 World Cup East Asia-Pacific sub-regional qualifier.

Japan won the opening match of the series by 65 runs, in what was their first international fixture since December 2018. The hosts secured the series with a 75-run victory in the second match. Indonesia picked up a consolation 3-wicket win in the final match, which was their first T20I win. Japan's Reo Sakurano-Thomas was named player of the series.

== Squads ==
Japan	Indonesia
Kendel Kadowaki-Fleming (c); Reo Sakurano-Thomas (vc); Kento Dobell; Ryan Drake; Vinay Iyer; Shogo Kimura; Kohei Kubota; Piyush Kumbhare; Wataru Miyauchi (wk); Supun Navaratne (wk); Sabaorish Ravichandran; Dinesh Sandaruwan; Alexander Shirai-Patmore (wk); Declan Suzuki; Ibrahim Takahashi; Makoto Taniyama; Lachlan Yamamoto-Lake	Kadek Gamantika (c); Muhammad Afis; Gede Arta; Ketut Artawan; Ferdinando Banunaek; Wayan Budiarta; Kadek Darmawan; Danilson Hawoe; Maxi Koda; Muhaddis; Ketut Pastika (wk); Gede Priandana; Kirubasankar Ramamoorthy; Ahmad Ramdoni (wk); Tri Rubbi; Padmakar Surve; Anjar Tadarus

== T20I series ==
=== 1st T20I ===
9 October 2022
13:30
Scorecard

Japan; 143/7 (20 overs)	v	Indonesia; 78/9 (20 overs)
Sabaorish Ravichandran 44 (29); Danilson Hawoe 2/19 (4 overs)		Padmakar Surve 19 (28); Reo Sakurano-Thomas 5/17 (4 overs)

Japan won by 65 runs
Sano International Cricket Ground, Sano
Umpires: Adam Birss (Jpn) and Chris Thurgate (Jpn)
Player of the match: Reo Sakurano-Thomas (Jpn)

- Japan won the toss and elected to bat.
- Kendel Kadowaki-Fleming, Kohei Kubota, Piyush Kumbhare, Supun Navaratne, Sabaorish Ravichandran, Reo Sakurano-Thomas, Alexander Shirai-Patmore, Declan Suzuki, Ibrahim Takahashi, Makoto Taniyama, Lachlan Yamamoto-Lake (Jpn), Muhammad Afis, Gede Arta, Ketut Artawan, Kadek Gamantika, Danilson Hawoe, Maxi Koda, Gede Priandana, Kirubasankar Ramamoorthy, Ahmad Ramdoni, Padmakar Surve and Anjar Tadarus (Idn) all made their T20I debuts.
- Reo Sakurano-Thomas became the first bowler for Japan to take a five-wicket haul in T20Is.

=== 2nd T20I ===
10 October 2022
13:30
Scorecard

Japan; 179/4 (17 overs)	v	Indonesia; 104/6 (17 overs)
Kendel Kadowaki-Fleming 81 (40); Ketut Artawan 2/25 (3 overs)		Gede Priandana 45* (52); Ibrahim Takahashi 1/9 (2 overs)

Japan won by 75 runs
Sano International Cricket Ground, Sano
Umpires: Adam Birss (Jpn) and Chris Thurgate (Jpn)
Player of the match: Kendel Kadowaki-Fleming (Jpn)

- Japan won the toss and elected to bat.
- The match was reduced to 17 overs per side due to rain.
- Kento Dobell, Vinay Iyer, Shogo Kimura (Jpn) and Wayan Budiarta (Idn) all made their T20I debuts.

=== 3rd T20I ===
11 October 2022
09:30
Scorecard

Japan; 79 (16.3 overs)	v	Indonesia; 82/7 (16 overs)
Ibrahim Takahashi 26 (31); Ketut Artawan 4/12 (3 overs)		Gede Priandana 19 (12); Piyush Kumbhare 2/8 (4 overs)

Indonesia won by 3 wickets
Sano International Cricket Ground, Sano
Umpires: Adam Birss (Jpn) and Chris Thurgate (Jpn)
Player of the match: Ketut Artawan (Idn)

- Japan won the toss and elected to bat.
- Ryan Drake (Jpn) and Ferdinando Banunaek (Idn) both made their T20I debuts.
