= Kendel Kadowaki-Fleming =

Japanese cricketer

Personal information
- Born: 5 January 1996 (age 30)
- Batting: Left-handed
- Bowling: Right-arm offbreak
- Role: Batsman

International information
- National side: Japan (2022–present)
- T20I debut (cap 1): 9 October 2022 v Indonesia
- Last T20I: 26 September 2026 v Nepal

Career statistics
Competition	T20I
Matches	59
Runs scored	1,905
Batting average	36.63
100s/50s	2/12
Top score	114
Balls bowled	12
Wickets	0
Bowling average	–
5 wickets in innings	–
10 wickets in match	–
Best bowling	–
Catches/stumpings	12/–
- Source: ESPNcricinfo, 4 October 2026

Kendel Kadowaki-Fleming, also simply known as Kendel Fleming (born 5 January 1996), is a Japanese cricketer and the current captain of the Japan national cricket team. He plays club cricket for Chiba Sharks Cricket Club. He also works as a senior financial analyst at Vincents and apparently owns and runs a player management company in Japan.

== Biography ==
He was born in Japan to a Japanese mother and an Australian father. He spent his childhood in Japan. His family then moved to Australia when he was six. After relocating to Australia, he began playing cricket at youth level at Under-12, Under-15, and Under-17 levels representing Queensland. He also played school cricket during his stint at Brisbane Grammar School and then joined the Northern Suburbs District Cricket Club to pursue his cricketing ambitions.

He first got in touch with the authorities and officials at Japan Cricket Association when he was 18 years old. He always cherished to represent Japan at international arena as he showed up to Japan almost every year travelling all the way from Australia. He also revealed that he would love to live in Japan. He insisted that he had developed an interest in opening up an athlete management company ever since he was a child. It was through the grandparent of Australian cricketer Nathan McSweeney that he seriously began thinking about becoming a player agent, and with the request of McSweeney's grandparent, he began his thought process of becoming a player agent, honing the required skillsets, and analyzing the skills issues of Nathan McSweeney. He also feared batting prowess of former Indian cricketer MS Dhoni during his young days when he was especially supporting Australia national cricket team.

== Career ==
He captained Japan cricket team in their first ever men's bilateral T20I series when they hosted Indonesia for a three-match series in October 2022. He made his international debut in Japan's first ever T20I match against Indonesia on 9 October 2022 where he also subsequently made his captaincy debut.

In October 2022, he was appointed as the captain of the Japanese national team for the 2022–23 ICC Men's T20 World Cup East Asia-Pacific Qualifier (in Qualifier B category) as part of the 2024 ICC Men's T20 World Cup qualification pathway targeting qualification towards reaching the main draw of the 2024 ICC Men's T20 World Cup. Japan made its presence felt throughout the competition with an array of splendid performances on their home turf and went onto reach the regional final after winning three matches in the Qualifier B category before losing the ticket to Papua New Guinea. During a match against South Korea in the Qualifier B category on 15 October 2022, Kendel Fleming scored his maiden T20I century after coming into bat at number 3 position and he became the first ever Japanese cricketer to score a century in men's T20Is representing Japan. He maintained a six-hitting spree throughout the match against South Korea as his knock included 10 sixes as well as 10 boundaries and for his noteworthy batting performance, he was awarded the player of the match. He smashed the century in just 40 deliveries and also set the record for the fastest T20I century by a Japanese cricketer and also set the record for the ninth fastest T20I century of all time in men's Twenty20 Internationals. He was eventually dismissed during the 14th over of the Japan's batting innings and he ended up his innings with a whirlwind knock of 114 in just 46 deliveries with a strike rate in excess of 240. His first 50 came in 21 balls, but he displayed a brisk, calculated aggression by going after the bowling of Kuldeep Gurjar by treating the latter with disdain, hammering five sixes in a row during the 10th over of Japan's innings, which also propelled the home crowd to go berserk owing to Kendel Fleming's onslaught. Kendel Kadowaki-Fleming also ended up the 2022–23 ICC Men's T20 World Cup East Asia-Pacific Qualifier B round as the leading run-scorer with a tally of 179 runs.

In May 2023, he captained Japan side for a five-match home bilateral T20 series against Sri Lanka Emerging XI side which was held at Sano International Cricket Ground as warmup preparations for Japan ahead of their much anticipated 2023 ICC Men's T20 World Cup EAP Final. Japan eventually lost the series 4–0 with the last match of the series being washed out due to rains.

In July 2023, he captained Japan for the 2023 ICC Men's T20 World Cup EAP Final where Japan had to compete for the final slot with Papua New Guinea, Philippines and Vanuatu to secure the berth for the coveted 2024 ICC Men's T20 World Cup in the West Indies and America. Under Fleming's captaincy, Japan flourished with a great start with three wins in their first four matches, but Japan ultimately lost their momentum with two further defeats in the competition, which meant Papua New Guinea as the overwhelming favorites to qualify for the 2024 ICC Men's T20 World Cup as Papua New Guinea won all of their six matches to edge past next-best team Japan in the points table to seal their spot for the ICC T20 World Cup.

He was retained as the skipper of the Japanese national cricket team for the 2022 Asian Games in China, where cricket made its comeback return to Asian Games after a brief hiatus of eight years. Japan ended the 2022 Asian Games with a tenth-place finish in the men's T20I competition, where Japan recorded a win and a loss to bow out of the competition with a consolation. He captained Japan at the 2024 ACC Men's Challenger Cup where Japan reached semi-finals before losing to Saudi Arabia in a low scoring contest.

He was chosen to captain Japan for the 2024 Twenty20 East Asia Cup. On 15 February 2024, during a round-robin match against China during the 2024 Twenty20 East Asia Cup, Fleming alongside his opening batting partner Lachlan Yamamoto-Lake put on a record breaking unbeaten opening partnership of 258 in 20 overs which was also the highest ever partnership recorded ever in terms of runs achieved for any wicket scored by any pair in all T20 matches. The partnership of 258 also broke the record for the highest ever partnership in men's T20Is for the first wicket surpassing the previous record held by Afghanistan duo Hazratullah Zazai and Usman Ghani who had put on 236 runs against Ireland in 2019. Fleming eventually scored his second T20I century in his career and he became the first Japanese player ever to score two T20I centuries in men's T20I history. He ended up unbeaten on 109 which came off just 53 deliveries which also included 11 towering sixes and three boundaries. It also turned out to be the very first instance in international cricket history that a team had not lost a wicket after completing full quota of 20 overs batting. In response, China were bowled out only for 78 runs and hence Japan won the match convincingly by a huge margin of 180 runs in order to register Japan's largest victory in men's T20Is in terms of runs. Both Lachlan Yamamoto-Lake and Kendel Kadowaki-Fleming were jointly adjudged as the players of the match for their relentless brutal batting display throughout the game.

He also played a pivotal role in bringing Australian cricketer Josh Brown on board for the 2024 Japan Premier League. Fleming also revealed that he manages Josh Brown and also indicated that they play together some club cricket in Brisbane. He also rapidly developed his network in cricketing fraternity and often engages in contract negotiations.

== See also ==
- List of Japan Twenty20 International cricketers
