= Abhishek Anand (cricketer) =

Japanese cricketer

Personal information
- Full name: Abhishek Anand
- Born: December 29, 1997 (age 28); Rohtas, Bihar, India
- Batting: Right-handed
- Bowling: Right-arm Medium
- Role: Batsman

International information
- National side: Japan (2025–present)
- T20I debut (cap 111): 9 May 2025 v Cook Islands
- Last T20I: 18 May 2026 v Papua New Guinea

Career statistics
Competition	T20I
Matches	18
Runs scored	275
Batting average	16.17
100s/50s	0/1
Top score	55
Balls bowled	30
Wickets	1
Bowling average	13.00
5 wickets in innings	-
10 wickets in match	-
Best bowling	1/4
Catches/stumpings	9/0
- Source: , 20 September 2026

Abhishek Anand (born 29 December 1997) is an Indian-born Japanese cricketer who represents the Japan national cricket team. He is a right-handed batter and right-arm medium-pace bowler. He has also played club cricket in Japan for Tokyo Falcons Cricket Club and East Kanto Sunrisers.

== Early life and education ==
Anand was born on 29 December 1997 in Rohtas district, Bihar, India. He studied chemistry at the Indian Institute of Technology Kanpur (IIT Kanpur). He later moved to Japan for employment, where he continued playing cricket at club level.

== Cricket career ==
Anand played domestic club cricket in Japan before being selected for the Japan national team. He made his Twenty20 International (T20I) debut for Japan against the Cook Islands national cricket team on 9 May 2025.

In 2026, Anand was included in Japan's men's national cricket squad. He recorded his maiden T20I half-century during his international career, with a highest score of 55. As of 18 May 2026, Anand had played 18 T20I matches for Japan, scoring 275 runs at an average of 16.17 and a highest score of 55. He had also bowled five overs and taken one wicket.

== Personal life ==
Anand moved to Japan for work and continued his cricket career alongside his professional activities.
