= List of Indonesia Twenty20 International cricketers =

This is a list of Indonesian Twenty20 International cricketers.

In April 2018, the ICC decided to grant full Twenty20 International (T20I) status to all its members. Therefore, all Twenty20 matches played between Indonesia and other ICC members after 1 January 2019 have the full T20I status.

This list comprises all members of the Indonesia cricket team who have played at least one T20I match. It is initially arranged in the order in which each player won his first Twenty20 cap. Where more than one player won his first Twenty20 cap in the same match, those players are listed alphabetically by surname. Indonesia played their first T20I matches during a tour of Japan, followed by the 2022–23 ICC Men's T20 World Cup East Asia-Pacific Qualifier in October 2022, in Sano.

== Key ==
General

- ‡ – Captain
- † – Wicket-keeper
- First – Year of debut
- Last – Year of latest game
- Mat – Number of matches played

Batting

- Runs – Runs scored in career
- HS – Highest score
- Avg – Runs scored per dismissal
- * – Batsman remained not out
- 50 – Number of half centuries
- 100 – Number of centuries scored

Bowling

- Balls – Balls bowled in career
- Wkt – Wickets taken in career
- BBI – Best bowling in an innings
- Ave – Average runs per wicket

Fielding

- Ca – Catches taken
- St – Stumpings affected

== List of players ==
Statistics are correct as of 26 June 2026.

Indonesia T20I cricketers
General					Batting					Bowling				Fielding		Ref
No.	Name	First	Last	Mat	Runs	HS	Avg	50	100	Balls	Wkt	BBI	Ave	Ca	St	Ref
1	Ahmad Ramdoni†	2022	2025	81	882	46	19.60	0	0	–	–	–	–	59	10	
2	Anjar Tadarus	2022	2026	89	767	59*	12.78	1	0	597	30	5/8	24.93	32	0	
3	Gede Arta	2022	2026	82	589	46	12.53	0	0	990	52	3/16	19.71	18	0	
4	Ketut Artawan	2022	2026	94	475	41	11.04	0	0	1,326	66	4/12	23.40	38	1	
5	Kadek Gamantika‡	2022	2026	88	1111	78*	18.21	1	0	1173	64	4/24	18.09	32	0	
6	Danilson Hawoe‡	2022	2026	111	643	40	10.04	0	0	1,872	98	4/18	23.06	48	0	
7	Maxi Koda	2022	2025	68	25	6	3.42	0	0	1,297	58	3/14	24.86	20	0	
8	Muhammad Afis	2022	2023	4	0	0	0.00	0	0	24	0	–	–	1	0	
9	Gede Priandana	2022	2026	90	1,598	78*	20.75	8	0	451	30	5/1	18.53	35	0	
10	Kirubasankar Ramamoorthy	2022	2025	30	424	55	16.30	2	0	83	5	3/17	20.40	6	0	
11	Padmakar Surve	2022	2025	39	928	71*	38.66	4	0	183	7	2/28	35.00	8	0	
12	Wayan Budiarta	2022	2024	5	4	4*	2.00	0	0	54	2	1/11	26.50	0	0	
13	Ferdinando Banunaek‡	2022	2026	105	365	54	13.03	1	0	1,899	96	4/17	22.97	50	0	
14	Kadek Darmawan†	2022	2023	3	25	16	8.33	0	0	–	–	–	–	1	0	
15	Muhaddis	2023	2023	4	56	34	18.66	0	0	–	–	–	–	3	0	
16	Ketut Pastika	2023	2023	3	23	14*	–	0	0	–	–	–	–	4	0	
17	Dhanesh Shetty	2023	2026	25	29	14	14.50	0	0	393	23	3/7	19.34	6	0	
18	Dharma Kesuma†	2023	2026	85	1,236	117*	17.91	1	3	–	–	–	–	31	5	
19	Sakhti Sheelan	2023	2023	1	28	28	28.00	0	0	–	–	–	–	0	0	
20	Gede Prastama	2023	2023	4	9	5*	9.00	0	0	–	–	–	–	1	0	
21	Apriliandi Rahayu	2023	2026	46	244	55*	16.26	1	0	401	28	4/11	13.64	21	0	
22	Gaurav Tiwari	2024	2026	26	433	56*	21.65	1	0	509	26	4/12	21.03	5	0	
23	Julang Dzulfikar	2024	2025	18	136	25	10.46	0	0	101	6	3/3	11.33	4	0	
24	Febrianto Heo	2024	2025	6	20	12	3.33	0	0	–	–	–	–	3	0	
25	Dewa Wiswi	2024	2026	22	85	26*	12.14	0	0	156	12	2/6	13.83	6	0	
26	Andreas Hawoe	2024	2026	19	50	30*	10.00	0	0	99	8	2/13	13.00	8	0	
27	Rizky Rubbi	2024	2024	2	11	9	5.50	0	0	–	–	–	–	0	0	
28	Ashish Gupta	2025	2025	5	24	14	6.00	0	0	–	–	–	–	0	0	
29	Taufiqry Soleh	2025	2025	1	9	9	9.00	0	0	–	–	–	–	0	0	
30	Vineet Shah	2025	2025	11	122	39	17.42	0	0	–	–	–	–	2	0	
31	Michael Byrne	2025	2025	2	0	0	0.00	0	0	–	–	–	–	1	0	
32	Sampath Kharvi	2025	2026	22	156	31	9.75	0	0	36	4	2/1	15.25	3	0	
33	Joshua Lynn	2025	2025	1	–	–	–	–	–	24	3	3/22	7.33	0	0	
34	Sudhakar Jegannathan	2025	2026	19	306	65*	25.50	1	0	270	20	2/6	13.70	3	0	
35	Divit Nanda	2025	2026	7	88	31	22.00	0	0	60	4	2/1	12.75	2	0	
36	Gede Wiguna	2025	2026	7	3	3*	–	0	0	96	4	2/27	32.50	2	0	
37	Komang Putra	2025	2025	4	4	4*	–	0	0	12	0	–	–	0	0	
38	Rico Ramadhasyena	2025	2025	4	78	56*	78.00	1	0	–	–	–	–	0	0	
39	Ketut Tembur	2025	2026	5	12	9	4.00	0	0	–	–	–	–	3	0	
40	Kavin Chaddha	2026	2026	19	452	75*	26.58	2	0	83	6	3/13	17.83	3	0	
41	Ida Bagus Nara	2026	2026	1	0	0	0.00	0	0	12	0	–	–	0	0	
42	Yudha Verdian	2026	2026	3	16	8	5.33	0	0	–	–	–	–	0	0	
43	Rohit Sharma	2026	2026	3	131	74	43.66	2	0	–	–	–	–	0	0	
43	Reshjgesh Jeyakumar	2026	2026	1	–	–	–	–	–	12	0	–	–	0	0	
