= Shogo Kimura =

Japanese baseball player (born 1980)

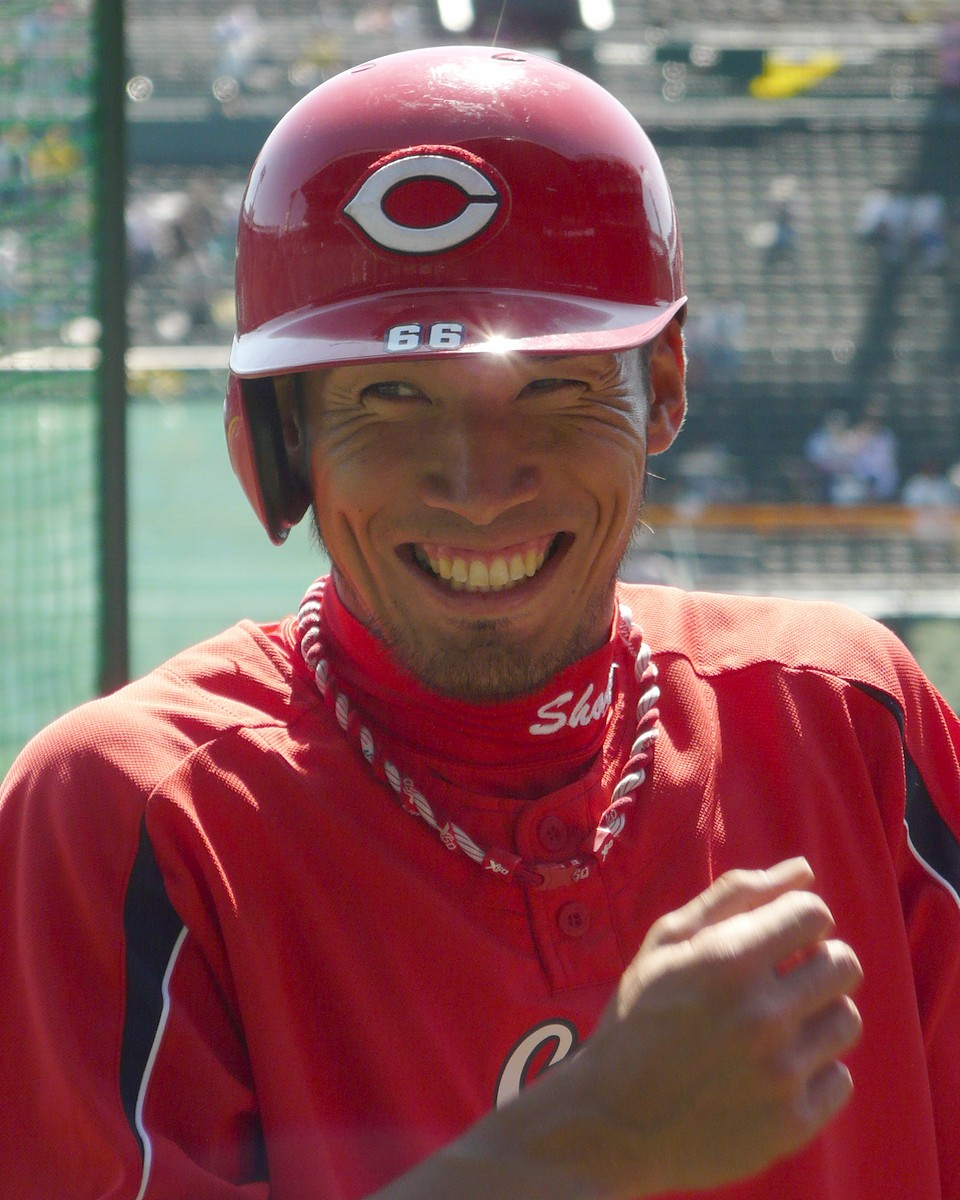
- Kimura with the Hiroshima Toyo Carp
- Infielder
- Born: April 16, 1980 (age 46); Jōtō-ku, Osaka, Osaka, Japan
- Batted: Right Threw: Right

NPB debut
- March 28, 2003, for the Yokohama BayStars

Last NPB appearance
- June 9, 2017, for the Saitama Seibu Lions

NPB statistics (through 2017 season)
- Batting average: .261
- Hits: 294
- RBIs: 71
- Home runs: 3
- Stats at Baseball Reference

Teams
- Yokohama BayStars (2003–2007); Hiroshima Toyo Carp (2008–2015); Saitama Seibu Lions (2016–2017)
- Cricket career
Personal information
- Height: 1.82 m (6 ft 0 in)
- Batting: Left-handed
- Role: Batter
International information
- National side: Japan (2018–2023)
- T20I debut (cap 13): 10 October 2022 v Indonesia
- Last T20I: 1 October 2023 v Hong Kong
Career statistics
Competition	T20I
Matches	5
Runs scored	35
Batting average	7.00
100s/50s	0/0
Top score	14
Catches/stumpings	1/–
- Source: Cricinfo, 1 October 2023

Shogo Kimura (木村 昇吾, Kimura Shōgo; born April 16, 1980 in Osaka, Osaka, Japan) is a professional Japanese baseball player and cricketer. He plays infielder for the Saitama Seibu Lions. He took up cricket with the Japan Cricket Association after going unsigned following his release by the Seibu Lions.

In September 2022, he was named in Japan's T20I squad for the 2022–23 ICC Men's T20 World Cup East Asia-Pacific Qualifier. Kimura was part of Japan's squad against the Indonesia cricket team that toured Japan in October 2022 to play a three-match Twenty20 International series. He made his T20I debut on 10 October 2022, in the second T20I of the series against Indonesia.
