= 2007 ICC EAP Cricket Trophy =

International cricket tournament

The 2007 ICC EAP Cricket Trophy (International Cricket Council East Asia Pacific Cricket Trophy) is an international cricket tournament that forms part of the ICC World Cricket League. It was played in Auckland, New Zealand from 2 to 8 December 2007, and formed part of the qualification structure for the 2011 Cricket World Cup.

== Teams ==
- Cook Islands
- Indonesia
- Japan
- Samoa
- Tonga
- Vanuatu

The top two teams from the tournament will qualify for Division Five of the World Cricket League in Jersey in May 2008.

== Squads ==
| Cook Islands | Indonesia | Japan |
|---|---|---|
| Patiia Ataeara; Chris Brown; Dunu Eliaba; Tino Etita; Pita Glassie; Joseph Joe; John Kairua; Mou Maururai; Teanini Raumea; Dawn Tare; Enuake Tare; Rusan Tare; Davis Teinaki; Daniel Webb; Grant Bradburn (Coach); Retire Puapili (Manager) | Chad Jeremy Paull (Captain); Pratyush Chaturvedi; Putra Dharmawan; Marten Eddy; Mohammad Imran; Srinivas Subramanian Krishnan; Subhash Modgil; Rajeev Kumar Radhakrishnan Nair; Fernandes Nato; Rajeev Rajeshwaran; Yesemberti O Rosongna; I Wayan Suandi; Simon Turnbull; Courtenay Werleman; Robert Hindmarsh (Coach); Prakash Vijaykumar (Manager) | Ko Irie (Captain); Masanori Abe; Gavin Beath; Tatsuro Chino; Tatsuo Fuji; Patrick Giles-Jones; Takuro Hagihara; Shunsuke Hashiba; Courtney Jones; Masaomi Kobayashi; Naoki Miyaji; Ahmed Munir; Kenji Murata; Kazuya Shibata; Richard Laidler (Coach); Kenta Yagi (Manager) |

| Samoa | Tonga | Vanuatu |
|---|---|---|
| Niko Apa; Alton Carmine; Geoffrey Clarke; Faavae Faaofo; Konelio Faiilagi; Lautala Fuimaono; Itugia Ieremia; Uala Kaisara; Ake Lotoalofa; Ben Mailata; Winston Mariner; Pritchard Pritchard; Uilisone Taisala; Sipiliano Tua; Murphy Su'a (Coach); Tavita Talapusi Tuisila (Manager) | Maunaloa Faivakimoana; Faka'osita'u Hala; Aisake Haukinima; Sione Hakaumotu Holi; Simione Latu 'Efalame Laumape; Mafi Matapule Langi; Mafi Matapule Laumape; Kaluseti 'Ofahulu; Livi'aetau Pese; Ivan Ta'akimoeaka; Tevita Po'uli Taulani; Salesi Mafi Tu'akoi; Sione Loutalo Vite; S U Selusalema Vite (Coach); Siale 'Ataongo Puloka (Manager) | Patrick Haines (Captain); Pierre Chilia; Jonathon Dunn; Selwyn Garae; Aby Joel; Ben Kingsbury; Trevor Langa; Andrew Mansale; Edy Mansale; Kenneth Natapei; Manu Nimoho; Simpson Obed; Richard Tatwin; Frederick Timakata; Tim Curran (Coach); Nick Cassidy (Manager) |

Match Officials
Geoff Clelland (Vanuatu)
Clive Elly (Papua New Guinea)
Neil Harrison (Japan)
Tony Hill (New Zealand)
Grant Johnston (Vanuatu)
Kevin Manley (New Zealand)
Lakani Oala (Papua New Guinea)

== Group stage ==
=== Points Table ===
| Team | Pld | W | T | L | NR | Pts | NRR |
|---|---|---|---|---|---|---|---|
| Japan | 5 | 5 | 0 | 0 | 0 | 10 | 1.132 |
| Vanuatu | 5 | 4 | 0 | 1 | 0 | 8 | 1.344 |
| Cook Islands | 5 | 3 | 0 | 2 | 0 | 6 | 0.837 |
| Samoa | 5 | 2 | 0 | 3 | 0 | 4 | -0.461 |
| Tonga | 5 | 1 | 0 | 4 | 0 | 2 | -1.277 |
| Indonesia | 5 | 0 | 0 | 5 | 0 | 0 | -1.942 |

=== Fixtures and results ===
2 December 2007
scorecard

| Indonesia; 148 all out (43.5 overs) | v | Cook Islands; 149/6 (31.2 overs) |
| Simon Turnbull 17; Chris Brown 3/25 | | Joseph Joe 44*; Pratyush Chaturvedi 2/23 |

Cook Islands won by 4 wickets
Waikaraka Park, Onehunga, Auckland
Umpires: ND Harrison and G Johnston

2 December 2007
scorecard

| Vanuatu; 142 all out (35.3 overs) | v | Japan; 143/5 (40 overs) |
| Andrew Mansale 79; Naoki Miyaji 4/56 | | Masaomi Kobayashi 33; Andrew Mansale 3/9 |

Japan won by 5 wickets
Waikaraka Park, Onehunga, Auckland
Umpires: CD Elly and L Oala

2 December 2007
scorecard

| Samoa; 191 all out (45 overs) | v | Tonga; 105 all out (32 overs) |
| Uilisone Taisala 54; Mafi Matapule Langi 3/38 | | Mafi Matapule Langi 19*; Winston Mariner 3/33 |

Samoa won by 86 runs
Waikaraka Park, Onehunga, Auckland
Umpires: G Clelland and KC Manley

3 December 2007
scorecard

| Tonga; 101 all out (25.1 overs) | v | Cook Islands; 102/2 (15 overs) |
| Sione Hakaumotu Holi 31; Dunu Eliaba 4/15 | | Pita Glassie 31; Simione Latu 1/20 |

Cook Islands won by 8 wickets
Waikaraka Park, Onehunga, Auckland
Umpires: G Clelland and L Oala

3 December 2007
scorecard

| Indonesia; 105 all out (31.4 overs) | v | Japan; 106/2 (17.1 overs) |
| Courtenay Werleman 37*; Patrick Giles-Jones 3/15 | | Gavin Beath 53; Subhash Modgil 1/5 |

Japan won by 8 wickets
Waikaraka Park, Onehunga, Auckland
Umpires: CD Elly and G Johnston

3 December 2007
scorecard

| Vanuatu; 200/9 (50 overs) | v | Samoa; 108 all out (27.1 overs) |
| Frederick Timakata 44; Konelio Faiilagi 3/23 | | Ben Mailata 55; Andrew Mansale 3/23 |

Vanuatu won by 92 runs
Waikaraka Park, Onehunga, Auckland
Umpires: ND Harrison and AL Hill

4 December 2007
scorecard

| Vanuatu; 167 all out (45.1 overs) | v | Cook Islands; 124 all out (37.1 overs) |
| Richard Tatwin 51; Tino Etita 5/16 | | Joseph Joe 34; Patrick Haines 4/27 |

Vanuatu won by 43 runs
Waikaraka Park, Onehunga, Auckland
Umpires: KC Manley and L Oala

4 December 2007
scorecard

| Tonga; 262 all out (49.5 overs) | v | Indonesia; 242 all out (48.1 overs) |
| Livi'aetau Pese 69; Courtenay Werleman 3/44 | | Pratyush Chaturvedi 75; Mafi Matapule Langi 5/65 |

Tonga won by 20 runs
Waikaraka Park, Onehunga, Auckland
Umpires: CD Elly and ND Harrison

4 December 2007
scorecard

| Japan; 220/9 (50 overs) | v | Samoa; 187 all out (42.2 overs) |
| Courtney Jones 72; Faavae Faaofo 3/43 | | Sipiliano Tua 92; Naoki Miyaji 5/32 |

Japan won by 33 runs
Waikaraka Park, Onehunga, Auckland
Umpires: G Clelland and G Johnston

6 December 2007

| Cook Islands; 79 all out (21 overs) | v | Japan; 50/1 (14 overs) |
| Patrick Giles-Jones 3/11 |

Match abandoned
Waikaraka Park, Onehunga, Auckland

- Match reduced to maximum of 26 overs per team

6 December 2007

| Indonesia | v | Samoa |

Match abandoned
Waikaraka Park, Onehunga, Auckland

- Match abandoned without a ball bowled

6 December 2007

| Tonga | v | Vanuatu |

Match abandoned
Waikaraka Park, Onehunga, Auckland

- Match abandoned without a ball bowled

7 December 2007
scorecard

| Cook Islands; 142 all out (39.1 overs) | v | Samoa; 36 all out (14.4 overs) |
| John Kairua 50; Winston Mariner 5/24 | | Ben Mailata 9 Tino Etita 3/8 |

Cook Islands won by 106 runs
Waikaraka Park, Onehunga, Auckland
Umpires: G Johnston and L Oala

- Match reduced to maximum of 40 overs per team

7 December 2007
scorecard

| Vanuatu; 236/9 (50 overs) | v | Indonesia; 74 all out (31.4 overs) |
| Simpson Obed 74*; Courtenay Werleman 3/49 | | Rajeev Rajeshwaran 16; Simpson Obed 3/6 |

Vanuatu won by 162 runs
Waikaraka Park, Onehunga, Auckland
Umpires: CD Elly and ND Harrison

7 December 2007
scorecard

| Japan; 154/7 (39 overs) | v | Tonga; 137 all out (37.1 overs) |
| Courtney Jones 27; Sione Hakaumotu Holi 1/18 | | Maunaloa Faivakimoana 32; Gavin Beath 3/30 |

Japan won by 17 runs
Waikaraka Park, Onehunga, Auckland
Umpires: G Clelland and AL Hill

- Match reduced to maximum of 39 overs per team

8 December 2007
scorecard

| Cook Islands; 118 all out (41.2 overs) | v | Japan; 119/5 (38.3 overs) |
| Tino Etita 47; Masanori Abe 3/1 | | Gavin Beath 38; Mou Maururai 2/26 |

Japan won by 5 wickets
Waikaraka Park, Onehunga, Auckland
Umpires: CD Elly and AL Hill

- Replay of abandoned match from 6 December

8 December 2007
scorecard

| Indonesia; 167 all out (46.2 overs) | v | Samoa; 168/7 (40 overs) |
| Chad Jeremy Paull 56; Winston Mariner 3/48 | | Ben Mailata 72*; Pratyush Chaturvedi 2/3 |

Samoa won by 3 wickets
Waikaraka Park, Onehunga, Auckland
Umpires: G Clelland and G Johnston

- Replay of abandoned match from 6 December

8 December 2007
scorecard

| Vanuatu; 226 all out (48.2 overs) | v | Tonga; 161 all out (46 overs) |
| Andrew Mansale 79; Tevita Po'uli Taulani 3/32 | | Ivan Ta'akimoeaka 40; Simpson Obed 4/54 |

Vanuatu won by 65 runs
Waikaraka Park, Onehunga, Auckland
Umpires: ND Harrison and L Oala

- Replay of abandoned match from 6 December

== Final and Playoffs ==
The final and playoffs originally scheduled for 8 December were cancelled, in favour of replaying abandoned matches from 6 December.

== Final Placings ==
| Pos | Team | Promotion/Relegation |
|---|---|---|
| 1st | Japan | Promoted to 2008 Global Division Five |
| 2nd | Vanuatu | Promoted to 2008 Global Division Five |
| 3rd | Cook Islands | Remain in EAP group |
| 4th | Samoa | Remain in EAP group |
| 5th | Tonga | Remain in EAP group |
| 6th | Indonesia | Remain in EAP group |

== Statistics ==
| Most Runs | | Most Wickets | |
|---|---|---|---|
| (Vanuatu) Andrew Mansale | 214 | (Japan) Naoki Miyaji | 12 |
| (Samoa) Sipiliano Tua | 160 | (Vanuatu) Simpson Obed | 11 |
| (Vanuatu) Simpson Obed | 159 | (Samoa) Winston Mariner | 11 |
| (Samoa) Ben Mailata | 145 | (Japan) Patrick Giles-Jones | 10 |
| (Tonga) Sione Hakaumotu Holi | 123 | (Samoa) Konelio Faiilagi | 10 |
| (Japan) Ahmed Munir | 116 | (Japan) Gavin Beath | 9 |
| (Japan) Gavin Beath | 112 | (Cook Islands) Dunu Eliaba | 9 |
| (Indonesia) Courtenay Werleman | 109 | (Vanuatu) Andrew Mansale | 9 |
| (Indonesia) Pratyush Chaturvedi | 109 | (Indonesia) Courtenay Werleman | 9 |
| (Tonga) Livi'aetau Pese | 109 | (Tonga) Mafi Matapule Langi | 9 |

== See also ==
- 2006 ICC EAP Cricket Trophy
- World Cricket League EAP region
