= 2005 ICC EAP Cricket Cup =

Cricket competition in Vanuatu

The 2005 ICC EAP Cricket Cup was held in Vanuatu between 23 and 29 September 2005 as part of the qualification pathway for the 2011 Cricket World Cup. Six teams from the East Asia-Pacific Region competed in a round-robin stage, followed by ranking finals. Japan defeated the Cook Islands in a close final held at Club Hippique in Port Vila, Vanuatu. Both finalists qualified for the 2006 ICC EAP Cricket Trophy; the other four teams -- Tonga, Vanuatu, Indonesia and Samoa -- had their World Cup hopes dashed six years before the final competition.

== Matches ==
=== Group stage ===
Pos	Team	Played	Won	Lost	No result	Tie	Points
1	Cook Islands	5	4	1	0	0	8
2	Japan	5	4	1	0	0	8
3	Tonga	5	4	1	0	0	8
4	Vanuatu	5	2	3	0	0	4
5	Indonesia	5	1	4	0	0	2
6	Samoa	5	0	5	0	0	1

=== Finals ===
==== 5th/6th Place Playoff ====
- Samoa vs Indonesia at Independence Park - 29 September 2005

Samoa 71 all out lost to Indonesia 72/3 (23 overs) by 7 wickets.

==== 3rd/4th Place Playoff ====
- Tonga vs Vanuatu at KaZaa Cricket Field - 29 September 2005

Tonga 105 all out lost to Vanuatu 106-4 (34 overs) by 6 wickets.

==== Final ====
- Japan vs Cook Islands at Club Hippique - 29 September 2005

Japan 161 all out (48 overs) beat Cook Islands 155 all out by 6 runs.

Classification
1	Japan
2	Cook Islands
3	Vanuatu
4	Tonga
5	Indonesia
6	Samoa

== See also ==
- International Cricket Council
