= List of Cook Islands Twenty20 International cricketers =

This is a list of Cook Islands Twenty20 International cricketers.

In April 2018, the ICC decided to grant full Twenty20 International (T20I) status to all its members. Therefore, all Twenty20 matches played between Cook Islands and other ICC members after 1 January 2019 will be eligible to have T20I status.

This list comprises all members of the Cook Islands cricket team who have played at least one T20I match. It is initially arranged in the order in which each player won his first Twenty20 cap. Where more than one player won his first Twenty20 cap in the same match, those players are listed alphabetically by surname. Cook Islands played their first matches with T20I status during the 2022–23 ICC Men's T20 World Cup East Asia-Pacific Qualifier, on 9 September 2022 in Port Vila, Vanuatu.

== Key ==
General

- ‡ – Captain
- † – Wicket-keeper
- First – Year of debut
- Last – Year of latest game
- Mat – Number of matches played

Batting

- Runs – Runs scored in career
- HS – Highest score
- Avg – Runs scored per dismissal
- * – Batsman remained not out
- 50 – Number of half centuries

Bowling

- Balls – Balls bowled in career
- Wkt – Wickets taken in career
- BBI – Best bowling in an innings
- Ave – Average runs per wicket

Fielding

- Ca – Catches taken
- St – Stumpings affected

== List of players ==
Statistics are correct as of 18 May 2026.

Cook Islands T20I cricketers
| General | | | | | Batting | | | | | Bowling | | | | Fielding | | Ref |
| No. | Name | First | Last | Mat | Runs | HS | Avg | 50 | 100 | Balls | Wkt | BBI | Ave | Ca | St | Ref |
|---|---|---|---|---|---|---|---|---|---|---|---|---|---|---|---|---|
| 1 | Ma'ara Ave‡† | 2022 | 2026 | 23 | 544 | 92* | 32.00 | 4 | 0 | 217 | 13 | 3/4 | 18.69 | 25 | 2 | |
| 2 | Liam Denny | 2022 | 2025 | 17 | 144 | 45 | 13.09 | 0 | 0 | 281 | 16 | 3/12 | 22.18 | 9 | 0 | |
| 3 | Cory Dickson | 2022 | 2026 | 23 | 238 | 41* | 17.00 | 0 | 0 | 409 | 22 | 3/21 | 19.59 | 7 | 0 | |
| 4 | Hayden Dickson | 2022 | 2026 | 20 | 460 | 112* | 24.21 | 3 | 1 | 272 | 9 | 2/22 | 30.00 | 8 | 0 | |
| 5 | William Kokaua | 2022 | 2022 | 5 | 6 | 4 | 6.00 | 0 | 0 | 60 | 6 | 3/26 | 17.50 | 1 | 0 | |
| 6 | Glenn Miller† | 2022 | 2022 | 2 | 5 | 5* | – | 0 | 0 | – | – | – | – | 0 | 1 | |
| 7 | Aue Parima† | 2022 | 2026 | 23 | 389 | 64 | 20.47 | 2 | 0 | 104 | 6 | 3/22 | 22.00 | 10 | 0 | |
| 8 | Thomas Parima | 2022 | 2026 | 23 | 447 | 104 | 22.35 | 0 | 1 | 15 | 0 | – | – | 8 | 0 | |
| 9 | Tomakanute Ritawa | 2022 | 2024 | 11 | 16 | 8 | 4.00 | 0 | 0 | 108 | 10 | 5/19 | 14.80 | 3 | 0 | |
| 10 | Dan Simpson | 2022 | 2022 | 3 | 6 | 4 | 3.00 | 0 | 0 | – | – | – | – | 0 | 0 | |
| 11 | Tomasi Vanuarua | 2022 | 2022 | 6 | 26 | 14* | 8.66 | 0 | 0 | 108 | 6 | 2/24 | 20.50 | 5 | 0 | |
| 12 | Davis Tainaki | 2022 | 2022 | 4 | 36 | 16 | 9.00 | 0 | 0 | – | – | – | – | 1 | 0 | |
| 13 | Ben Vakatini | 2022 | 2025 | 6 | 5 | 5 | 1.66 | 0 | 0 | – | – | – | – | 2 | 0 | |
| 14 | Gabe Raymond | 2022 | 2022 | 2 | – | – | – | – | – | – | – | – | – | 0 | 0 | |
| 15 | Milton Kavana | 2024 | 2025 | 8 | 27 | 9 | 6.75 | 0 | 0 | 87 | 7 | 2/25 | 14.28 | 0 | 0 | |
| 16 | Andrew Samuels | 2024 | 2024 | 6 | 14 | 11* | – | 0 | 0 | 96 | 3 | 2/23 | 44.66 | 2 | 0 | |
| 17 | Oscar Taylor | 2024 | 2026 | 17 | 61 | 22* | 7.62 | 0 | 0 | 282 | 26 | 5/17 | 12.42 | 4 | 0 | |
| 18 | Jared Tutty | 2024 | 2026 | 14 | 31 | 13* | 10.33 | 0 | 0 | 270 | 16 | 2/8 | 18.31 | 4 | 0 | |
| 19 | Tiaki Wuatai | 2024 | 2025 | 6 | 10 | 7* | 5.00 | 0 | 0 | – | – | – | – | 1 | 0 | |
| 20 | Pita Ravarua | 2024 | 2025 | 2 | 0 | 0 | 0.00 | 0 | 0 | – | – | – | – | 0 | 0 | |
| 21 | Teaomua Anker | 2024 | 2024 | 1 | 1 | 1* | – | 0 | 0 | – | – | – | – | 0 | 0 | |
| 22 | James Pickering† | 2025 | 2026 | 11 | 39 | 13 | 9.75 | 0 | 0 | – | – | – | – | 4 | 3 | |
| 23 | Paani Vailoa | 2025 | 2025 | 2 | 16 | 9 | 16.00 | 0 | 0 | – | – | – | – | 0 | 0 | |
| 24 | Luca Gracce | 2026 | 2026 | 6 | 32 | 24 | 8.00 | 0 | 0 | – | – | – | – | 1 | 0 | |
| 25 | Jeremiah Shields | 2026 | 2026 | 5 | 13 | 5* | 6.50 | 0 | 0 | – | – | – | – | 1 | 0 | |
| 26 | Quin Stephens | 2026 | 2026 | 6 | 3 | 2* | 0.75 | 0 | 0 | 110 | 9 | 3/4 | 11.44 | 4 | 0 | |
| 27 | Paul Cummings | 2026 | 2026 | 1 | – | – | – | – | – | – | – | – | – | 0 | 0 | |
