= Cricket at the 2022 Asian Games – Men's tournament =

Men at the 2022 Asian Games
- Venue: ZJUT Cricket Field
- Date: 27 September – 7 October 2023
- Competitors: 201 from 14 nations

Medalists
gold medal	India
silver medal	Afghanistan
bronze medal	Bangladesh

A men's cricket event was held as part of the 2022 Asian Games in Hangzhou, China from 27 September to 7 October 2023. Fourteen teams competed in the event, and the participating teams were seeded according to their T20I rankings as of 1 June 2023. India won the gold medal, while Afghanistan finished as runners-up.

== Squads ==
Afghanistan	Bangladesh	Cambodia	Hong Kong
Nijat Masood; Karim Janat; Gulbadin Naib; Noor Ali Zadran; Sharafuddin Ashraf; Shahidullah; Sediqullah Atal; Qais Ahmad; Afsar Zazai; Sayed Shirzad; Fareed Ahmad; Zubaid Akbari; Wafiullah Tarakhil; Zahir Khan; Mohammad Shahzad	Mrittunjoy Chowdhury; Sumon Khan; Nahid Rana; Parvez Hossain Emon; Ripon Mondol; Zakir Hasan; Saif Hassan; Jaker Ali; Afif Hossain; Yasir Ali; Rishad Hossain; Mahmudul Hasan Joy; Shahadat Hossain; Hasan Murad; Rakibul Hasan	Lakshit Gupta; Sharwan Godara; Te Senglong; Chanthoeun Rathanak; Luqman Butt; Pel Vannak; Anish Prasad; Salvin Stanly; Uday Hathinjar; Phon Bunthean; Ram Raushan Sharan; Gulam Murtaza; Etienne Beukes	Adil Mehmood; Babar Hayat; Akbar Khan; Nasrulla Rana; Hamed Khan; Shiv Mathur; Ayush Shukla; Niaz Ali; Hassan Khan Mohammad; Mohammad Waheed; Nizakat Khan; Mohammad Ghazanfar; Muhammad Khan; Ehsan Khan; Anas Khan
India	Japan	Malaysia	Maldives
Arshdeep Singh; Washington Sundar; Jitesh Sharma; Shivam Dube; Ruturaj Gaikwad; Rinku Singh; Shahbaz Ahmed; Mukesh Kumar; Rahul Tripathi; Ravi Bishnoi; Sai Kishore; Yashasvi Jaiswal; Avesh Khan; Tilak Varma; Prabhsimran Singh	Wataru Miyauchi; Mian Siddique; Reo Sakurano-Thomas; Declan Suzuki; Kendel Kadowaki-Fleming; Kohei Kubota; Alex Shirai-Patmore; Kazuma Kato; Makoto Taniyama; Ibrahim Takahashi; Tsuyoshi Takada; Lachlan Lake; Ashley Thurgate; Ryan Drake; Shogo Kimura	Sharvin Muniandy; Sharveen Surendran; Syed Aziz; Muhammad Amir Azim; Ainool Hafizs; Ahmad Faiz; Syazrul Idrus; Pavandeep Singh; Haiqal Khair; Virandeep Singh; Aiman Zaquan Ridzuan; Muhammad Akram Malek; Vijay Unni; Zubaidi Zulkifle; Anwar Rahman	Fareed Shius; Tholal Raya; Hassan Haziq Rasheed; Mohamed Miuvaan; Ismail Ali; Mohamed Sulaiman; Rasheed Rassam; Naseer Naail Ismail; Muawiyath Ghanee; Hussain Saadhin; Azin Rafeeq; Nazwan Ismail
Mongolia	Nepal	Pakistan	Singapore
Sumiyaagiin Tur-Erdene; Jamyansürengiin Davaasüren; Mönkhbatyn Enkhtüvshin; Altankhuyagiin Möngön; Terbishiin Buyantüshig; Erdenebulgany Luvsanzundui; Naranbaataryn Nyambaatar; Otgonbayaryn Enkh-Erdene; Lutbayaryn Od; Tömörsükhiin Törmönkh; Namsrain Bat-Yalalt	Kushal Malla; Binod Bhandari; Sagar Dhakal; Aasif Sheikh; Sompal Kami; Abinash Bohara; Kushal Bhurtel; Gulsan Jha; Rohit Paudel; Sundeep Jora; Sandeep Lamichhane; Karan KC; Pratis GC; Dipendra Singh Airee; Bibek Yadav	Sufiyan Muqeem; Omair Yousuf; Mirza Tahir Baig; Arafat Minhas; Shahnawaz Dahani; Arshad Iqbal; Rohail Nazir; Asif Ali; Haider Ali; Muhammad Akhlaq; Mubasir Khan; Qasim Akram; Aamir Jamal; Khushdil Shah; Usman Qadir	Anantha Krishna; Aahan Gopinath Achar; Avi Dixit; Janak Prakash; Anish Paraam; Abdul Rahman Bhadelia; Chetan Suryawanshi; Raoul Sharma; Rohan Rangarajan; Arjun Mutreja; Aryaman Sunil; Aman Desai; Navin Param; Ishaan Sawney; Rezza Gaznavi
Sri Lanka	Thailand		
Isitha Wijesundara; Ashen Bandara; Shevon Daniel; Ranitha Liyanarachchi; Ravindu Fernando; Nuwanidu Fernando; Lahiru Udara; Lasith Croospulle; Ahan Wickramasinghe; Sahan Arachchige; Nuwan Thushara; Vijayakanth Viyaskanth; Sachitha Jayathilake; Lahiru Samarakoon; Nimesh Vimukthi	Narawit Nuntarach; Khanitson Namchaikul; Sorawat Desungnoen; Chaloemwong Chatphaisan; Anucha Kalasi; Chanchai Pengkumta; Phanuwat Desungnoen; Chiraphong Liangwichian; Phiriyaphong Suanchuai; Thanaphon Yotharat; Sarawut Maliwan; Phanuphong Thongsa; Nopphon Senamontree; Satarut Rungrueang; Yodsak Saranonnakkun		

== Results ==
All times are China Standard Time (UTC+08:00)

=== Group Stage ===
==== Group A ====
Pos	Team	Pld	W	L	T	NR	Pts	NRR	Qualification
1	Nepal	2	2	0	0	0	4	10.275	Quarterfinals
2	Maldives	2	1	1	0	0	2	−1.700	
3	Mongolia	2	0	2	0	0	0	−11.575	

Source: ESPNcricinfo

27 September
9:00
Scorecard

Nepal; 314/3 (20 overs)	v	Mongolia; 41 (13.1 overs)
Kushal Malla 137* (50); Erdenebulgany Luvsanzundui 1/47 (4 overs)		Jamyansürengiin Davaasüren 10 (23); Karan KC 2/1 (2 overs)

Nepal won by 273 runs
ZJUT Cricket Field, Hangzhou
Umpires: Arif Ansari (THA) and Chris Thurgate (JPN)

- Mongolia won the toss and elected to field.

28 September
14:00
Scorecard

Mongolia; 60/9 (20 overs)	v	Maldives; 62/1 (6.4 overs)
Jamyansürengiin Davaasüren 15 (39); Azin Rafeeq 3/10 (4 overs)		Azin Rafeeq 24* (16); Tömörsükhiin Törmönkh 1/15 (2 overs)

Maldives won by 9 wickets
ZJUT Cricket Field, Hangzhou
Umpires: Liu Jingmin (CHN) and Narayanan Sivan (MAS)

- Maldives won the toss and elected to field.

1 October
9:00
Scorecard

Nepal; 212/7 (20 overs)	v	Maldives; 74 (19.4 overs)
Rohit Paudel 52 (27); Nazwan Ismail 3/17 (4 overs)		Muawiyath Ghanee 36 (34); Abinash Bohara 6/11 (3.4 overs)

Nepal won by 138 runs
ZJUT Cricket Field, Hangzhou
Umpires: Mahmood Kharoti (AFG) and Ramasamy Venkatesh (HKG)

- Nepal won the toss and elected to bat.

==== Group B ====
Pos	Team	Pld	W	L	T	NR	Pts	NRR	Qualification
1	Hong Kong	2	2	0	0	0	4	3.507	Quarterfinals
2	Japan	2	1	1	0	0	2	−0.015	
3	Cambodia	2	0	2	0	0	0	−3.500	

Source: ESPNcricinfo

27 September
14:00
Scorecard

Cambodia; 125/7 (20 overs)	v	Japan; 126/7 (18.1 overs)
Sharwan Godara 36* (23); Ryan Drake 3/15 (4 overs)		Kendel Kadowaki-Fleming 35 (23); Sharwan Godara 3/25 (4 overs)

Japan won by 3 wickets
ZJUT Cricket Field, Hangzhou
Umpires: Anand Natarajan (SGP) and Ramasamy Venkatesh (HKG)

- Cambodia won the toss and elected to bat.

29 September
9:00
Scorecard

Cambodia; 70 (18.2 overs)	v	Hong Kong; 75/1 (5.5 overs)
Ram Raushan Sharan 27 (34); Nasrulla Rana 4/7 (4 overs)		Babar Hayat 40* (12); Gulam Murtaza 1/14 (2 overs)

Hong Kong won by 9 wickets
ZJUT Cricket Field, Hangzhou
Umpires: Mahmood Kharoti (AFG) and Masudur Rahman (BAN)

- Hong Kong won the toss and elected to field.

1 October
14:00
Scorecard

Japan; 127 (19 overs)	v	Hong Kong; 133/5 (18.5 overs)
Lachlan Lake 60 (36); Ayush Shukla, Anas Khan 2/23 (4 overs)		Nasrulla Rana 36* (18); Kohei Kubota 1/14 (3 overs)

Hong Kong won by 5 wickets
ZJUT Cricket Field, Hangzhou
Umpires: Masudur Rahman (BAN) and Sarika Prasad (SGP)

- Hong Kong won the toss and elected to field.

==== Group C ====
Pos	Team	Pld	W	L	T	NR	Pts	NRR	Qualification
1	Malaysia	2	2	0	0	0	4	6.675	Quarterfinals
2	Singapore	2	1	1	0	0	2	0.650	
3	Thailand	2	0	2	0	0	0	−7.325	

Source: ESPNcricinfo

28 September
9:00
Scorecard

Malaysia; 160/8 (20 overs)	v	Singapore; 87 (17.5 overs)
Virandeep Singh 44* (34); Anish Paraam 3/16 (4 overs)		Janak Prakash 26* (21); Muhammad Amir Azim 2/7 (2.5 overs)

Malaysia won by 73 runs
ZJUT Cricket Field, Hangzhou
Umpires: Ramasamy Venkatesh (HKG) and Mahmood Kharoti (AFG)

- Singapore won the toss and elected to field.

29 September
14:00
Scorecard

Singapore; 152/8 (20 overs)	v	Thailand; 53 (15.3 overs)
Chetan Suryawanshi 53 (36); Chanchai Pengkumta 4/22 (4 overs)		Phanuwat Desungnoen 14 (16); Aahan Gopinath Achar 4/8 (4 overs)

Singapore won by 99 runs
ZJUT Cricket Field, Hangzhou
Umpires: Chris Thurgate (JPN) and Narayanan Sivan (MAS)

- Singapore won the toss and elected to bat.

2 October
9:00
Scorecard

Malaysia; 268/4 (20 overs)	v	Thailand; 74/9 (20 overs)
Syed Aziz 126 (56); Sorawat Desungnoen 2/43 (4 overs)		Nopphon Senamontree 15 (21); Virandeep Singh 2/6 (4 overs)

Malaysia won by 194 runs
ZJUT Cricket Field, Hangzhou
Umpires: Anand Natarajan (SGP) and Chris Thurgate (JPN)

- Malaysia won the toss and elected to bat.

=== Knockout round ===
Quarterfinals
3 October
India	202/4
Nepal	179/9
4 October
Bangladesh	116/5
Malaysia	114/8
3 October
Pakistan	160
Hong Kong	92
4 October
Sri Lanka	108
Afghanistan	116

Semifinals
6 October
India	97/1
Bangladesh	96/9
6 October
Pakistan	115
Afghanistan	116/6

Gold medal match
7 October
India	NR
Afghanistan	112/5
Bronze medal match
7 October
Bangladesh (DLS)	65/4
Pakistan	48/1

==== Quarterfinals ====
3 October
9:00
Scorecard

India; 202/4 (20 overs)	v	Nepal; 179/9 (20 overs)
Yashasvi Jaiswal 100 (49); Dipendra Singh Airee 2/31 (4 overs)		Dipendra Singh Airee 32 (15); Ravi Bishnoi 3/24 (4 overs)

India won by 23 runs
ZJUT Cricket Field, Hangzhou
Umpires: Mahmood Kharoti (AFG) and Asif Yaqoob (PAK)

- India won the toss and elected to bat.

3 October
14:00
Scorecard

Pakistan; 160 (20 overs)	v	Hong Kong; 92 (18.5 overs)
Aamir Jamal 41 (16); Ayush Shukla 4/49 (4 overs)		Babar Hayat 29 (26); Khushdil Shah 3/13 (4 overs)

Pakistan won by 68 runs
ZJUT Cricket Field, Hangzhou
Umpires: Masudur Rahman (BAN) and Ruchira Palliyaguruge (SRI)

- Hong Kong won the toss and elected to field.

4 October
9:00
Scorecard

Afghanistan; 116 (18.3 overs)	v	Sri Lanka; 108 (19.1 overs)
Noor Ali Zadran 51 (52); Nuwan Thushara 4/17 (3 overs)		Sahan Arachchige 22 (29); Qais Ahmad 3/16 (4 overs)

Afghanistan won by 8 runs
ZJUT Cricket Field, Hangzhou
Umpires: Asif Yaqoob (PAK) and Masudur Rahman (BAN)

- Sri Lanka won the toss and elected to field.

4 October
14:00
Scorecard

Bangladesh; 116/5 (20 overs)	v	Malaysia; 114/8 (20 overs)
Saif Hassan 50* (52); Pavandeep Singh 2/12 (4 overs)		Virandeep Singh 52 (39); Afif Hossain 3/11 (4 overs)

Bangladesh won by 2 runs
ZJUT Cricket Field, Hangzhou
Umpires: Ruchira Palliyaguruge (SRI) and Mahmood Kharoti (AFG)

- Bangladesh won the toss and elected to bat.

==== Semifinals ====
6 October
9:00
Scorecard

Bangladesh; 96/9 (20 overs)	v	India; 97/1 (9.2 overs)
Jaker Ali 24* (29); Sai Kishore 3/12 (4 overs)		Tilak Varma 55* (26); Ripon Mondol 1/26 (2 overs)

India won by 9 wickets
ZJUT Cricket Field, Hangzhou
Umpires: Asif Yaqoob (PAK) and Mahmood Kharoti (AFG)

- India won the toss and elected to field.

6 October
14:00
Scorecard

Pakistan; 115 (18 overs)	v	Afghanistan; 116/6 (17.5 overs)
Omair Yousuf 24 (19); Fareed Ahmad 3/15 (3 overs)		Noor Ali Zadran 39 (33); Arafat Minhas 2/11 (3 overs)

Afghanistan won by 4 wickets
ZJUT Cricket Field, Hangzhou
Umpires: Ruchira Palliyaguruge (SRI) and Masudur Rahman (BAN)

- Afghanistan won the toss and elected to field.

==== Bronze medal match ====
7 October
9:00
Scorecard

Pakistan; 48/1 (5 overs)	v	Bangladesh; 65/4 (5 overs)
Mirza Tahir Baig 32* (18); Rakibul Hasan 1/12 (2 overs)		Yasir Ali 34 (16); Arshad Iqbal 3/14 (2 overs)

Bangladesh won by 6 wickets (DLS method)
ZJUT Cricket Field, Hangzhou
Umpires: Mahmood Kharoti (AFG) and Sarika Prasad (SGP)

- Bangladesh won the toss and elected to field.
- The match was initially reduced to 13 overs per side due to rain.
- Bangladesh were set a revised target of 64 runs from 5 overs due to rain.

==== Gold medal match ====
7 October
14:00
Scorecard

Afghanistan; 112/5 (18.2 overs)	v	India
Shahidullah 49* (43); Shivam Dube 1/4 (1 over)

No result
ZJUT Cricket Field, Hangzhou
Umpires: Ruchira Palliyaguruge (SRI) and Masudur Rahman (BAN)

- India won the toss and elected to field.
- No further play was possible due to rain.
- India won by virtue of being the higher-seeded team.

== Final standing ==
Rank	Team	Pld	W	L	T	NR
1st place, gold medalist(s)	India	3	2	0	0	1
2nd place, silver medalist(s)	Afghanistan	3	2	0	0	1
3rd place, bronze medalist(s)	Bangladesh	3	2	1	0	0
4	Pakistan	3	1	2	0	0
5	Hong Kong	3	2	1	0	0
5	Malaysia	3	2	1	0	0
5	Nepal	3	2	1	0	0
5	Sri Lanka	1	0	1	0	0
9	Japan	2	1	1	0	0
9	Maldives	2	1	1	0	0
9	Singapore	2	1	1	0	0
12	Cambodia	2	0	2	0	0
12	Mongolia	2	0	2	0	0
12	Thailand	2	0	2	0	0
