= Japan Cricket Association =

Japanese non-profit organization

- Sport: Cricket
- Jurisdiction: National
- Affiliation: International Cricket Council (ICC)
- Regional affiliation: Asian Cricket Council (1996–2001, 2024–); ICC East Asia-Pacific (2001–)
- Sponsor: MKI, Mizuno, Mitsui

Official website
- cricket.or.jp/en/
- (Japan)

Japan Cricket Association, a Japanese non-profit organization, is the governing body for cricket in Japan. It was originally formed in 1984 and registered as NPO in 2001. The association operates the Japan national cricket team and the Japan women's national cricket team, and organises domestic cricket in Japan. It has been an Associate Member of the International Cricket Council since 2005, belonging to the East-Asia Pacific region, under the International Cricket Council's development program and in 2024, rejoined as a member of the Asian Cricket Council. The headquarters of the association are in Minato-ku, Tokyo.

== History ==
Cricket was introduced to Japan in the 1860s, by the British, but did not become organised until the 1980s, when the Japan Cricket Association was formed. They became an affiliate member of the ICC in 1989, and the national team first played in the 1996 ACC Trophy, losing all their games including a 380-run defeat to Fiji. They continued without success in the 1998 tournament and the 2000 tournament.

After the 2000 ACC Trophy, they left the Asian Cricket Council and became part of the ICC's East Asia-Pacific region. They played in the East Asia-Pacific Eights tournament in Australia in February 2002, finishing as runners-up to an Australian indigenous team. Indonesia and South Korea were the other teams in the tournament. In 2004, they hosted the East Asia Pacific Cricket Challenge tournament as part of qualification for the 2007 World Cup, finishing third after beating Indonesia in a play-off.

In June 2005, Japan were promoted to associate membership of the ICC and that year they played in the 2005 ICC EAP Cricket Cup in Vanuatu, winning the tournament after beating the Cook Islands in the final. The following year they played in the 2006 ICC EAP Cricket Trophy in Brisbane finishing last in the three team tournament that also involved Fiji and the Cook Islands.

In December 2007, Japan took part in the 2007 ICC EAP Cricket Trophy in Auckland, New Zealand, playing against the Cook Islands, Indonesia, Samoa, Tonga and Vanuatu. Japan won the tournament and qualified for Division Five of the World Cricket League where they finished in tenth place out of the twelve countries represented in Jersey.

On 22 March 2016, it was announced that Sano, Tochigi, would be home to the Sano International Cricket Ground, which will become Japan's first dedicated cricketing venue built for purpose, which no longer had to compete with other sports for usage.

In July 2020, the Japan Cricket Association won the Cricket 4 Good Initiative of the Year award, following the impact of Typhoon Hagibis, in the ICC's Annual Development Awards to recognise developing cricketing nations.

On January 31, 2024, the Japan Cricket Association rejoined the Asian Cricket Council (ACC).
