= List of Japan Twenty20 International cricketers =

This is a list of Japanese Twenty20 International cricketers.

In April 2018, the ICC decided to grant full Twenty20 International (T20I) status to all its members. Therefore, all Twenty20 matches played between Japan and other ICC members after 1 January 2019 have T20I status.

This list comprises names of all members of the Japan cricket team who have played at least one T20I match. It is initially arranged in the order in which each player won his first Twenty20 cap. Where more than one player won his first Twenty20 cap in the same match, their surnames are listed alphabetically. Japan played their first matches with T20I status versus the touring Indonesian team, followed by the 2022–23 ICC Men's T20 World Cup East Asia-Pacific Qualifier in October 2022, in Sano.

== Key ==
General

- ‡ – Captain
- † – Wicket-keeper
- First – Year of debut
- Last – Year of latest game
- Mat – Number of matches played

Batting

- Runs – Runs scored in career
- HS – Highest score
- Avg – Runs scored per dismissal
- * – Batsman remained not out
- 50 – Number of half centuries
- 100 – Centuries scored

Bowling

- Balls – Balls bowled in career
- Wkt – Wickets taken in career
- BBI – Best bowling in an innings
- Ave – Average runs per wicket

Fielding

- Ca – Catches taken
- St – Stumpings affected

== List of players ==
Statistics are correct as of 26 September 2026.

Japan T20I cricketers
General					Batting					Bowling				Fielding		Ref
No.	Name	First	Last	Mat	Runs	HS	Avg	50	100	Balls	Wkt	BBI	Ave	Ca	St	Ref
1	Kendel Kadowaki-Fleming‡	2022	2026	59	1,905	114	36.63	12	2	12	0	–	–	12	0	
2	Kohei Kubota	2022	2026	19	3	2	3.00	0	0	260	18	3/11	12.61	3	0	
3	Piyush Kumbhare	2022	2024	20	15	5*	3.00	0	0	403	24	3/8	12.45	3	0	
4	Supun Navaratne†	2022	2023	8	79	21	11.28	0	0	–	–	–	–	4	0	
5	Sabaorish Ravichandran	2022	2026	53	997	86*	22.15	5	0	917	63	5/11	11.76	23	0	
6	Reo Sakurano-Thomas‡	2022	2026	47	314	39	11.62	0	0	662	47	6/26	14.95	10	0	
7	Alexander Shirai-Patmore†	2022	2026	44	473	52	16.89	1	0	–	–	–	–	20	14	
8	Declan Suzuki	2022	2026	58	435	45*	13.59	0	0	638	36	5/20	21.05	22	0	
9	Ibrahim Takahashi	2022	2026	60	695	54*	15.79	1	0	937	52	3/4	17.30	16	0	
10	Makoto Taniyama	2022	2026	43	108	19	9.81	0	0	569	43	4/19	12.32	17	0	
11	Lachlan Yamamoto-Lake	2022	2026	46	838	134*	19.95	4	1	–	–	–	–	13	0	
12	Kento Dobell	2022	2022	3	3	3*	3.00	0	0	42	3	2/15	15.33	0	0	
13	Shogo Kimura	2022	2023	5	35	14	7.00	0	0	–	–	–	–	1	0	
14	Vinay Iyer	2022	2022	2	6	6	6.00	0	0	–	–	–	–	1	0	
15	Ryan Drake	2022	2025	15	28	11*	28.00	0	0	197	8	3/15	38.50	5	0	
16	Wataru Miyauchi†	2023	2026	39	438	72	16.84	2	0	6	0	–	–	18	11	
17	Mian Siddique	2023	2023	3	29	28	14.50	0	0	42	3	2/17	11.33	0	0	
18	Tsuyoshi Takada	2023	2023	3	21	12*	10.50	0	0	–	–	–	–	0	0	
19	Koji Abe	2024	2025	24	260	80	13.68	1	0	6	1	1/8	8.00	5	0	
20	Charlie Hara-Hinze	2024	2026	41	155	23*	11.07	0	0	795	49	5/6	14.06	7	0	
21	Kazuma Kato-Stafford	2024	2025	12	55	21	13.75	0	0	152	16	5/7	7.81	3	0	
22	Marcus Thurgate†	2024	2024	2	17	17	17.00	0	0	–	–	–	–	1	0	
23	Abdul Samad	2024	2026	19	24	11*	–	0	0	328	20	2/4	10.80	4	0	
24	Kiefer Yamamoto-Lake	2024	2026	6	9	9	9.00	0	0	66	4	2/10	15.00	2	0	
25	Benjamin Ito-Davis	2024	2026	28	289	47*	17.00	0	0	412	33	3/8	9.18	17	0	
26	Alester Kadowaki-Fleming	2024	2026	4	130	65*	65.00	1	0	–	–	–	–	1	0	
27	Shoma Sugaya-Slater	2025	2026	18	30	12	7.50	0	0	221	10	2/18	25.90	6	0	
28	Kazumasa Hiratsuka	2025	2025	1	2	2	2.00	0	0	–	–	–	–	0	0	
29	Abhishek Anand	2025	2026	18	275	55	16.17	1	0	30	1	1/4	13.00	9	0	
30	Esam Rahman	2025	2026	14	373	64	33.90	2	0	84	1	1/3	125.00	6	0	
31	Jake Kusuda-Nairn	2026	2026	1	–	–	–	–	–	6	1	1/18	18.00	0	0	
