= Ma'ara Ave =

New Zealand cricketer (born 1998)

Personal information
- Full name: Mea Tangi Me Ma'ara Joshua Ave
- Born: 6 July 1998 (age 28); Wellington, New Zealand
- Batting: Right-handed
- Role: Wicketkeeper batter

International information
- National side: Cook Islands
- T20I debut (cap 1): 9 September 2022 v Samoa
- Last T20I: 18 May 2026 v Samoa
- Source: Cricinfo, 29 September 2025

Mea Tangi Me Ma'ara Joshua Ave (born 6 July 1998) is a New Zealand-born cricketer, who captains the Cook Islands national cricket team.

Ave is of Cook Islands heritage. He attended Marlborough Boys' College, and has an honours degree in chemical engineering with a master's degree in dairy science and technology from Massey University. He works as a researcher for Fonterra.

A right-handed batsman and wicket-keeper, Ave has played Hawke Cup cricket since 2014, first for Marlborough and more recently for Manawatu. He made his List A debut for Central Districts in the 2018–19 Ford Trophy on 24 October 2018. He made his first-class debut on 15 November 2021, for Central Districts in the 2021–22 Plunket Shield season. He made his Twenty20 debut on 31 December 2021, for Central Districts in the 2021–22 Super Smash.

On 11 March 2022, Ave played a match for Otago as a temporary loan player due to Otago being affected by the COVID-19 pandemic. He replaced wicket-keeper Max Chu. Ave thus became the first player in the history of the Plunket Shield to represent two teams in the same season.

He was part of Cook Islands' Twenty20 International (T20I) squad for the 2022 ICC Men's T20 World Cup East Asia-Pacific Qualifier A in Vanuatu. He made his T20I debut on 9 September 2022 against Samoa.
