= 2022 Men's T20 World Cup EAP sub-regional qualifiers =

Cricket qualification tournaments

The 2024 ICC Men's T20 World Cup was the ninth edition of the ICC Men's T20 World Cup, a biennial world cup for cricket in Twenty20 International (T20I) format, organized by the International Cricket Council (ICC). The qualification process for the world cup included two stages: direct qualification and regional qualification. The regional qualification for East Asia-Pacific (EAP) was held in two stages: sub-regional qualifiers and regional final. The EAP region's sub-regional phase consisted of two sub-regional qualifiers, hosted by Vanuatu Cricket Association and Japan Cricket Association from 9 to 15 September and 15 to 18 October 2022 respectively.

Cook Islands and Fiji both played their first men's T20I matches during qualifier A. Vanuatu progressed to the regional final after finishing atop the qualifier A's points table. Cook Island's Ma'ara Ave was named player of the series having scored the most runs (290) while Fiji's Seru Tupou took the most wickets (10) in the tournament.

Japan progressed to the regional final after finishing atop the qualifier B's points table. Japan's Lachlan Yamamoto-Lake was named player of the series while Kendel Kadowaki-Fleming scored the most runs (179) and Indonesia's Ketut Artawan, Japan's Sabaorish Ravichandran and South Korea's Aamir Lal took the most wickets (7 each) in the tournament.

== Qualifier A ==
2022 ICC Men's T20 World Cup EAP sub-regional qualifier A
- Dates: 9 – 15 September 2022
- Administrator(s): International Cricket Council; ICC East Asia-Pacific
- Cricket format: Twenty20 International
- Tournament format: Double round-robin
- Host: Vanuatu
- Champions: Vanuatu
- Runners-up: Fiji
- Participants: 4
- Matches: 12
- Player of the series: (Cook Islands) Ma'ara Ave
- Most runs: (Cook Islands) Ma'ara Ave (290)
- Most wickets: (Fiji) Seru Tupou (10)

Squads for the qualifier A
Cook Islands	Fiji	Samoa	Vanuatu
Ma'ara Ave (c); Liam Denny; Cory Dickson; Hayden Dickson; Mamanu Emile; William Kokaua; Glenn Miller (wk); Aue Parima (wk); Thomas Parima; Gabe Raymond; Tomakanute Ritawa; Dan Simpson; Davis Teinaki; Ben Vakatini; Tomasi Vanuarua	Jone Wesele (c); Noa Acawei (vc); Josaia Baleicikobia; Metuisela Beitaki (wk); Petero Cabebula; Sosiceni Delai; Samuela Draunivudi; Delaimatuku Maraiwai; Sekove Ravoka; Siteri Tabuisulu; Seru Tupou; Peni Vuniwaqa; Tevita Waqavakatoga; Sosiceni Weleilakeba	James Baker (c); Sean Cotter; Douglas Finau; Caleb Jasmat; Uala Kaisala (wk); ~~Benjamin Mailata~~; Andrew Michael; Dom Michael; Darren Roache; Bismarck Schuster; Uili Sofi; Samson Sola; ~~Sean Solia~~; Fereti Suluoto; Saumani Tiai	Patrick Matautaava (c); Jarryd Allan (wk); Junior Kaltapau; Andrew Mansale; Williamsing Nalisa; Nalin Nipiko; Simpson Obed; Joshua Rasu; Rival Samson; Apolinaire Stephen; Ronald Tari; Darren Wotu; Womejo Wotu; Obed Yosef

Sean Solia was originally announced as captain of the Samoan squad, but was later named in the New Zealand A squad for their tour of India. The Cook Islands squad consisted of seven players based in the islands and seven players based in Auckland. The squad convened in Auckland to play three practice matches against an Auckland Māori side in preparation for the qualifier. Before the start of the tournament, Samoa's Benjamin Mailata also withdrew from the squad.

=== Qualifier A fixtures ===
Pos	Team	Pld	W	L	NR	Pts	NRR	Qualification
1	Vanuatu	6	5	1	0	10	1.228	Advanced to the regional final
2	Fiji	6	3	3	0	6	−0.240	
3	Cook Islands	6	3	3	0	6	−0.929	
4	Samoa	6	1	5	0	2	−0.114	

Source: ESPNcricinfo

9 September 2022
09:30
Scorecard

Vanuatu; 173/5 (20 overs)	v	Fiji; 117/9 (20 overs)
Andrew Mansale 57* (37); Tevita Waqavakatoga 2/19 (3 overs)		Josaia Baleicikobia 28 (25); Patrick Matautaava 3/13 (3 overs)

Vanuatu won by 56 runs
Vanuatu Cricket Ground, Port Vila
Umpires: Bri Olewale (PNG) and Pankaj Patki (Phi)
Player of the match: Andrew Mansale (Van)

- Vanuatu won the toss and elected to bat.
- Jarryd Allan, Junior Kaltapau, Rival Samson, Womejo Wotu (Van), Noa Acawei, Josaia Baleicikobia, Metuisela Beitaki, Petero Cabebula, Samuela Draunivudi, Delaimatuku Maraiwai, Sekove Ravoka, Seru Tupou, Peni Vuniwaqa, Tevita Waqavakatoga and Jone Wesele (Fij) all made their T20I debuts.

9 September 2022
13:30
Scorecard

Cook Islands; 110/8 (20 overs)	v	Samoa; 112/3 (11.2 overs)
Ma'ara Ave 28 (31); Samson Sola 3/21 (4 overs)		Fereti Suluoto 44* (19); Tomasi Vanuarua 1/10 (1 over)

Samoa won by 7 wickets
Vanuatu Cricket Ground, Port Vila
Umpires: Pankaj Patki (Phi) and Claire Polosak (Aus)
Player of the match: Fereti Suluoto (Sam)

- Samoa won the toss and elected to field.
- Ma'ara Ave, Liam Denny, Cory Dickson, Hayden Dickson, William Kokaua, Glenn Miller, Aue Parima, Thomas Parima, Tomakanute Ritawa, Dan Simpson, Tomasi Vanuarua (Cok), Douglas Finau, Caleb Jasmat, Uala Kaisala, Uili Sofi and Fereti Suluoto (Sam) all made their T20I debuts.

10 September 2022
09:30
Scorecard

Cook Islands; 142 (20 overs)	v	Fiji; 143/7 (16.5 overs)
Hayden Dickson 51 (38); Sekove Ravoka 3/23 (4 overs)		Peni Vuniwaqa 72* (39); Ma'ara Ave 2/4 (2 overs)

Fiji won by 3 wickets
Vanuatu Cricket Ground, Port Vila
Umpires: Merielle Kenni (Van) and Bri Olewale (PNG)
Player of the match: Peni Vuniwaqa (Fij)

- Cook Islands won the toss and elected to bat.
- Davis Teinaki and Ben Vakatini (Cok) both made their T20I debuts.

10 September 2022
13:30
Scorecard

Samoa; 122/9 (20 overs)	v	Vanuatu; 123/1 (15.3 overs)
Dom Michael 54 (46); Rival Samson 2/14 (2 overs)		Nalin Nipiko 62* (46); Samson Sola 1/22 (3.3 overs)

Vanuatu won by 9 wickets
Vanuatu Cricket Ground, Port Vila
Umpires: Pankaj Patki (Phi) and Claire Polosak (Aus)
Player of the match: Nalin Nipiko (Van)

- Samoa won the toss and elected to bat.
- Darren Wotu (Van) made his T20I debut.

11 September 2022
09:30
Scorecard

Vanuatu; 127 (19 overs)	v	Cook Islands; 128/5 (16.2 overs)
Andrew Mansale 53 (47); William Kokaua 3/26 (3 overs)		Ma'ara Ave 50 (48); Joshua Rasu 2/45 (4 overs)

Cook Islands won by 5 wickets
Vanuatu Cricket Ground, Port Vila
Umpires: Bri Olewale (PNG) and Claire Polosak (Aus)
Player of the match: Ma'ara Ave (Cok)

- Vanuatu won the toss and elected to bat.
- Gabe Raymond (Cok) made his T20I debut.

11 September 2022
13:30
Scorecard

Samoa; 142/6 (20 overs)	v	Fiji; 145/7 (19.4 overs)
Dom Michael 63* (44); Seru Tupou 2/24 (4 overs)		Peni Vuniwaqa 68 (46); Saumani Tiai 2/21 (4 overs)

Fiji won by 3 wickets
Vanuatu Cricket Ground, Port Vila
Umpires: Merielle Kenni (Van) and Pankaj Patki (Phi)
Player of the match: Peni Vuniwaqa (Fij)

- Samoa won the toss and elected to bat.
- Sosiceni Weleilakeba (Fij), Darren Roache and Bismarck Schuster (Sam) all made their T20I debuts.

13 September 2022
09:30
Scorecard

Samoa; 157/9 (20 overs)	v	Cook Islands; 158/6 (20 overs)
Saumani Tiai 35 (14); Liam Denny 3/12 (4 overs)		Ma'ara Ave 76* (59); Dom Michael 2/37 (4 overs)

Cook Islands won by 4 wickets
Vanuatu Cricket Ground, Port Vila
Umpires: Merielle Kenni (Van) and Bri Olewale (PNG)
Player of the match: Ma'ara Ave (Cok)

- Cook Islands won the toss and elected to field.

13 September 2022
13:30
Scorecard

Vanuatu; 167/7 (20 overs)	v	Fiji; 149/9 (20 overs)
Andrew Mansale 38 (34); Jone Wesele 4/31 (4 overs)		Josaia Baleicikobia 31 (23); Obed Yosef 2/20 (4 overs)

Vanuatu won by 18 runs
Vanuatu Cricket Ground, Port Vila
Umpires: Pankaj Patki (Phi) and Claire Polosak (Aus)
Player of the match: Jone Wesele (Fij)

- Fiji won the toss and elected to field.
- Obed Yosef (Van) made his T20I debut.

14 September 2022
09:30
Scorecard

Samoa; 120/7 (20 overs)	v	Vanuatu; 122/4 (19.2 overs)
James Baker 40* (23); Apolinaire Stephen 3/40 (4 overs)		Andrew Mansale 30* (27); Douglas Finau 1/23 (3 overs)

Vanuatu won by 6 wickets
Vanuatu Cricket Ground, Port Vila
Umpires: Bri Olewale (PNG) and Claire Polosak (Aus)
Player of the match: Apolinaire Stephen (Van)

- Vanuatu won the toss and elected to field.

14 September 2022
13:30
Scorecard

Fiji; 147 (20 overs)	v	Cook Islands; 150/2 (18.3 overs)
Peni Vuniwaqa 40 (21); Tomakanute Ritawa 5/19 (4 overs)		Ma'ara Ave 92* (61); Seru Tupou 1/21 (3 overs)

Cook Islands won by 8 wickets
Vanuatu Cricket Ground, Port Vila
Umpires: Merielle Kenni (Van) and Pankaj Patki (Phi)
Player of the match: Ma'ara Ave (Cok)

- Cook Islands won the toss and elected to field.
- Sosiceni Delai (Fij) made his T20I debut.
- Tomakanute Ritawa became the first bowler for Cook Islands to take a five-wicket haul in men's T20Is.

15 September 2022
09:30
Scorecard

Fiji; 147 (19.5 overs)	v	Samoa; 117 (18.3 overs)
Seru Tupou 35 (26); Darren Roache 3/23 (3 overs)		Sean Cotter 45 (43); Seru Tupou 3/10 (4 overs)

Fiji won by 30 runs
Vanuatu Cricket Ground, Port Vila
Umpires: Merielle Kenni (Van) and Claire Polosak (Aus)
Player of the match: Seru Tupou (Fij)

- Samoa won the toss and elected to field.

15 September 2022
13:30
Scorecard

Vanuatu; 160/4 (16 overs)	v	Cook Islands; 123 (14.3 overs)
Junior Kaltapau 60 (46); Tomakanute Ritawa 2/29 (3 overs)		Cory Dickson 28 (16); Nalin Nipiko 4/12 (2.3 overs)

Vanuatu won by 50 runs (DLS method)
Vanuatu Cricket Ground, Port Vila
Umpires: Bri Olewale (PNG) and Pankaj Patki (Phi)
Player of the match: Nalin Nipiko (Van)

- Cook Islands won the toss and elected to field.
- Cook Islands were set a revised target of 174 runs from 16 overs due to rain.

== Qualifier B ==
2022 ICC Men's T20 World Cup EAP sub-regional qualifier B
- Dates: 15 – 18 October 2022
- Administrator(s): International Cricket Council; ICC East Asia-Pacific
- Cricket format: Twenty20 International
- Tournament format: Double round-robin
- Host: Japan
- Champions: Japan
- Runners-up: Indonesia
- Participants: 3
- Matches: 6
- Player of the series: (Japan) Lachlan Yamamoto-Lake
- Most runs: (Japan) Kendel Kadowaki-Fleming (179)
- Most wickets: (Indonesia) Ketut Artawan (7) (Japan) Sabaorish Ravichandran (7) (South Korea) Aamir Lal (7)

Squads for the qualifier B
Indonesia	Japan	South Korea
Kadek Gamantika (c); Muhammad Afis; Gede Arta; Ketut Artawan; Ferdinando Banunaek; Wayan Budiarta; Kadek Darmawan; Danilson Hawoe; Maxi Koda; Muhaddis; Ketut Pastika (wk); Gede Priandana; Kirubasankar Ramamoorthy; Ahmad Ramdoni (wk); Tri Rubbi; Padmakar Surve; Anjar Tadarus	Kendel Kadowaki-Fleming (c); Reo Sakurano-Thomas (vc); Kento Dobell; ~~Ryan Drake~~; Shogo Kimura; Kohei Kubota; Piyush Kumbhare; Wataru Miyauchi (wk); Supun Navaratne (wk); Sabaorish Ravichandran; Alexander Shirai-Patmore (wk); Declan Suzuki; Ibrahim Takahashi; Makoto Taniyama; Lachlan Yamamoto-Lake	Jun Hyunwoo (c); Amir Altaf; Kim Daeyeon; Kuldeep Gurjar; Lee Hwanhee; An Hyobeom; Asif Iqbal; Lee Kangmin; Aamir Lal; Iqbal Mudassir; Alam Nakash; Nishat Nazmussakib; Soochan Park; Lee Sangwook; Raja Shoaib (wk); Sana Ullah

Wataru Miyauchi replaced Ryan Drake in Japan's squad before the start of the tournament.

=== Qualifier B fixtures ===
Pos	Team	Pld	W	L	NR	Pts	NRR	Qualification
1	Japan	4	3	1	0	6	2.928	Advanced to the regional final
2	Indonesia	4	3	1	0	6	1.066	
3	South Korea	4	0	4	0	0	−3.965	

Source: ESPNcricinfo

15 October 2022
09:30
Scorecard

Indonesia; 130/7 (19 overs)	v	South Korea; 66 (14.4 overs)
Padmakar Surve 61 (45); Lee Hwanhee 2/6 (1 over)		Jun Hyunwoo 21 (28); Maxi Koda 3/15 (3 overs)

Indonesia won by 64 runs
Sano International Cricket Ground, Sano
Umpires: Michael Graham-Smith (Aus) and Chris Thurgate (Jpn)
Player of the match: Padmakar Surve (Idn)

- South Korea won the toss and elected to field.
- The match was reduced to 19 overs per side due to rain.
- Kadek Darmawan (Idn), Kim Daeyeon, Kuldeep Gurjar, Lee Hwanhee, An Hyobeom, Jun Hyunwoo, Asif Iqbal, Aamir Lal, Iqbal Mudassir, Alam Nakash, Raja Shoaib and Sana Ullah (Kor) all made their T20I debuts.

15 October 2022
13:30
Scorecard

Japan; 218/8 (20 overs)	v	South Korea; 170/6 (20 overs)
Kendel Kadowaki-Fleming 114 (46); Aamir Lal 2/28 (4 overs)		Iqbal Mudassir 46 (26); Kohei Kubota 2/28 (4 overs)

Japan won by 48 runs
Sano International Cricket Ground, Sano
Umpires: Ashwani Kumar Rana (Tha) and Suresh Subramanian (Idn)
Player of the match: Kendel Kadowaki-Fleming (Jpn)

- Japan won the toss and elected to bat.
- Lee Kangmin and Nishat Nazmussakib (Kor) both made their T20I debuts.
- Kendel Kadowaki-Fleming scored the sixth fastest men's T20I century and became the first player for Japan to score a century in men's T20Is.

16 October 2022
13:30
Scorecard

Indonesia; 83 (18.5 overs)	v	Japan; 84/6 (9.5 overs)
Padmakar Surve 28 (31); Reo Sakurano-Thomas 3/11 (2.5 overs)		Lachlan Yamamoto-Lake 31 (17); Kirubasankar Ramamoorthy 3/17 (3.5 overs)

Japan won by 4 wickets
Sano International Cricket Ground, Sano
Umpires: Suresh Subramanian (Idn) and Chris Thurgate (Jpn)
Player of the match: Reo Sakurano-Thomas (Jpn)

- Indonesia won the toss and elected to bat.

17 October 2022
13:30
Scorecard

South Korea; 91 (19.1 overs)	v	Japan; 95/2 (8.2 overs)
Kim Daeyeon 29 (24); Piyush Kumbhare 2/8 (4 overs)		Lachlan Yamamoto-Lake 55 (28); Nishat Nazmussakib 1/17 (1.2 overs)

Japan won by 8 wickets
Sano International Cricket Ground, Sano
Umpires: Michael Graham-Smith (Aus) and Suresh Subramanian (Idn)
Player of the match: Lachlan Yamamoto-Lake (Jpn)

- Japan won the toss and elected to field.
- Soochan Park (Kor) made his T20I debut.

18 October 2022
09:30
Scorecard

Japan; 103 (18.4 overs)	v	Indonesia; 104/4 (17 overs)
Kendel Kadowaki-Fleming 31 (23); Ketut Artawan 3/14 (4 overs)		Gede Priandana 42 (43); Sabaorish Ravichandran 2/14 (4 overs)

Indonesia won by 6 wickets
Sano International Cricket Ground, Sano
Umpires: Michael Graham-Smith (Aus) and Ashwani Kumar Rana (Tha)
Player of the match: Ketut Artawan (Idn)

- Japan won the toss and elected to bat.
- The match was reduced to 19 overs per side due to rain.

18 October 2022
13:30
Scorecard

South Korea; 98/6 (20 overs)	v	Indonesia; 99/7 (10.4 overs)
Alam Nakash 24 (21); Danilson Hawoe 2/13 (4 overs)		Gede Priandana 32 (20); Aamir Lal 4/35 (4 overs)

Indonesia won by 3 wickets
Sano International Cricket Ground, Sano
Umpires: Ashwani Kumar Rana (Tha) and Chris Thurgate (Jpn)
Player of the match: Alam Nakash (Kor)

- South Korea won the toss and elected to bat.
