= Japan national cricket team =

Japan
- Nickname: The Samurais
- Association: Japan Cricket Association

Personnel
- Captain: Kendel Kadowaki-Fleming
- Coach: David Reid

International Cricket Council
- ICC status: Affiliate member (1989); Associate member (2005)
- ICC region: East Asia-Pacific
ICC Rankings	Current	Best-ever
T20I	41st	40th (05 May 2026)

International cricket
- First international: Japan v. Brunei (Kuala Lumpur; 6 September 1996)

T20 Internationals
- First T20I: v Indonesia at Sano International Cricket Ground, Sano; 9 October 2022
- Last T20I: v Nepal at Kōrogi Sports Park, Nisshin; 26 September 2026
T20Is	Played	Won/Lost
Total	65	41/21 (1 tie, 2 no result)
This year	13	8/4 (1 tie, 1 no results)
- T20 World Cup Qualifier appearances: 2 (Note: T20 World Cup Qualifier refers to the Regional Final of the ICC EAP/Asia-EAP region from the 2023 edition.) (first in 2023)
- Best result: Runners-up (2023)
T20I kit
- As of 26 September 2026

The Japan national cricket team is the men's team that represents Japan in international cricket. The team is organised by the Japan Cricket Association (JCA), which has been a member of the International Cricket Council (ICC) since 1989. Japan made its international cricketing debut at the 1996 ACC Trophy in Malaysia. Most of the team's matches are played in regional competitions, generally against other teams in the ICC East Asia-Pacific development region. Between 2008 and 2012, Japan participated in the World Cricket League (WCL), reaching WCL Division Five at one point.

In April 2018, the ICC decided to grant full Twenty20 International (T20I) status to all its members. Therefore, all Twenty20 matches played between Japan and other ICC members since 1 January 2019 have the full T20I status.

Japan were placed in qualifier B in the 2022–23 ICC Men's T20 World Cup East Asia-Pacific Qualifier, which was held in Sano, Japan. They beat Indonesia and South Korea to reach the East Asia-Pacific Regional Final, where they lost to the Papua New Guinea national cricket team. They will participate in the 2024 ICC Men's T20 World Cup East Asia-Pacific Qualifier B, which will take place in South Korea from September to October.

== History ==
Cricket was introduced to Japan in the 1860s, by the British, but did not become organised until the 1980s, when the Japan Cricket Association was formed. They became an affiliate member of the ICC in 1989, and the national team first played in the 1996 ACC Trophy, losing all their games including a 380 run defeat by Fiji. They continued without success in the 1998 tournament and the 2000 tournament.

After the 2000 ACC Trophy, they left the Asian Cricket Council and became part of the ICC's East Asia/Pacific region. They played in the East Asia Eights tournament in Australia in February 2002, finishing as runners-up to an Australian indigenous team. Indonesia and South Korea were the other teams in the tournament. In 2004, they hosted the East Asia Pacific Cricket Challenge tournament as part of qualification for the 2007 World Cup, finishing third after beating Indonesia in a play-off.

In June 2005, Japan were promoted to associate membership of the ICC and that year they played in the 2005 ICC EAP Cricket Cup in Vanuatu, winning the tournament after beating the Cook Islands in the final. The following year they played in the 2006 ICC EAP Cricket Trophy in Brisbane finishing last in the three team tournament that also involved Fiji and the Cook Islands.

In December 2007 Japan took part in the 2007 ICC EAP Cricket Trophy in Auckland, New Zealand, playing against the Cook Islands, Indonesia, Samoa, Tonga and Vanuatu. Japan won the tournament and qualified for Division Five of the World Cricket League where they finished in tenth place out of the twelve countries represented in Jersey.

On 22 March 2016, it was announced that Sano, Tochigi, would be home to the Sano International Cricket Ground, which will become Japan's first dedicated purpose-built cricketing venue which no longer had to compete with other sports for usage.

On 9 October 2022, Japan played their first ever T20 international match against Indonesia. In January 2023 it was announced that Japan and Indonesia would be included in Asian Cricket Council (ACC) pathway events, while remaining in the ICC East Asia-Pacific development region. Japan was formally readmitted to ACC membership in January 2024, with Indonesia also joining as a member.

Japan participated at the 2022 Asian Games cricket tournament. They were placed in a group along with Cambodia and Hong Kong, finishing 2nd and missed out on the knockout stage. This was the Japan national cricket team's first appearance at the Asian Games.

In recent years, the Japan Cricket Association has been actively promoting the game in Japan by conducting many professional ODI and T20 leagues, such as the Japan Cricket League and Japan Cup. The JCA has also designed a cricket blast programme to teach 8-12-year-old school children. Cricket in Japan is also being bolstered by immigrants from India, Pakistan, Australia, Britain, Sri Lanka, and Nepal.

== Grounds ==
Location of international cricket matches played in Japan

== Tournament history ==
=== T20 World Cup East Asia Pacific Regional Final ===
Year	Round	Position	GP	W	L	T	NR
(Papua New Guinea) 2019	Did not qualify						
(Japan) 2021	Event cancelled						
(Papua New Guinea) 2023	Round-robin	2/4	6	3	3	0	0
Total	1/2	0 Title	6	3	3	0	0

=== T20 World Cup Asia–EAP Regional Final ===
Year	Round	Position	GP	W	L	T	NR
(Oman) 2025	Super 6	5/6	7	2	5	0	0
Total	1/1	0 Title	7	2	5	0	0

- A – Advanced to Global Qualifier.
- Q – Qualified for T20 World Cup.

=== Asian Games ===
Year	Round	Position	GP	W	L	T	NR
(China) 2010	Did not participate						
(South Korea) 2014	Did not participate						
(China) 2022	Group Stage	9/14	2	1	1	0	0
(Japan) 2026	Group Stage	10/10	2	0	1	0	1
Total	2/4	0 Title	4	1	2	0	1

=== Twenty20 East Asia Cup ===
Year	Round	Position	GP	W	L	T	NR
(Hong Kong) 2015	Runners-up	2/4	3	2	1	0	0
(Japan) 2016	Runners-up	2/4	4	3	1	0	0
(Hong Kong) 2018	Champions	1/4	4	4	0	0	0
(Hong Kong) 2024	Runners-up	2/3	5	2	3	0	0
Total	4/4	1 Title	16	11	5	0	0

=== Other tournaments ===
ACC Challenger Cup	ACC Trophy	World Cricket League (List A/ODI)	T20WC EAP Sub-regional Qualifiers (T20I)
2023: Did not participate; 2024: 4th place	1996: First round; 1998: First round; 2000: First round	2008: Division 5 Tenth place; 2009: Division 7 Fourth place; 2011: Division 7 Sixth place; 2012: Division 8 Third place	2018: 3rd place; 2022: Winners — Advanced; 2024: Winners — Advanced; 2026: Runner-ups

== Current squad ==
Updated as of 12 May 2024

This lists all the players who have played for Japan in the past 12 months or has been part of the latest T20I squad.

Name	Age	Batting style	Bowling style	Notes
Batters
Lachlan Yamamoto-Lake	23	Right-handed		
Kendel Kadowaki-Fleming	30	Left-handed	Right-arm off break	Captain
Koji Hardgrave-Abe	20	Right-handed	Right-arm off break	
Alester Kadowaki-Fleming	29	Right-handed		
All-rounders
Ibrahim Takahashi	27	Right-handed	Right-arm off break	
Declan Suzuki-McComb	23	Left-handed	Right-arm medium	
Sabaorish Ravichandran	34	Right-handed	Right-arm leg break	
Benjamin Ito-Davis	27	Right-handed	Right-arm off break	
Wicket-keepers
Wataru Miyauchi	28	Right-handed		
Alexander Shirai-Patmore	29	Left-handed		
Spin Bowlers
Makoto Taniyama	30	Right-handed	Right-arm leg break	
Charles Hara-Hinze	18	Left-handed	Slow left-arm orthodox	
Abdul Samad	22	Left-handed	Slow left-arm orthodox	
Pace Bowlers
Reo Sakurano-Thomas	27	Right-handed	Right-arm medium	Vice-Captain
Ryan Drake	23	Right-handed	Right-arm medium	
Kazuma Kato-Stafford	19	Left-handed	Left-arm medium	
Kohei Kubota	28	Right-handed	Right-arm medium	
Kiefer Yamamoto-Lake	20	Left-handed	Right-arm medium	

== Records ==
International Match Summary — Japan

Last updated 26 September 2026

Playing Record
Format	M	W	L	T	NR	Inaugural Match
Twenty20 Internationals	65	41	21	1	2	9 October 2022

=== Twenty20 International ===
- Highest team total: 258/0 v. China on 15 February 2024 at Mission Road Ground, Mong Kok.
- Highest individual score: 134*, Lachlan Yamamoto-Lake v. China on 15 February 2024 at Mission Road Ground, Mong Kok.
- Best individual bowling figures: 6/26, Reo Sakurano-Thomas v. Thailand on 2 February 2024 at Terdthai Cricket Ground, Bangkok.

Most T20I runs for Japan

Player	Runs	Average	Career span
Kendel Kadowaki-Fleming	1,879	37.58	2022–2026
Sabaorish Ravichandran	997	22.15	2022–2026
Lachlan Yamamoto-Lake	837	20.92	2022–2026
Ibrahim Takahashi	689	16.40	2022–2026
Alex Shirai-Patmore	469	17.37	2022–2026

Most T20I wickets for Japan

Player	Wickets	Average	Career span
Sabaorish Ravichandran	63	11.76	2022–2026
Ibrahim Takahashi	48	17.25	2022–2026
Charles Hinze	47	13.06	2024–2026
Reo Sakurano-Thomas	45	15.33	2022–2026
Makoto Taniyama	43	12.18	2022–2026

T20I record versus other nations

Records complete to T20I #4147. Last updated 26 September 2026.

Opponent	M	W	L	T	NR	First match	First win
ICC Full members
Afghanistan	1	0	1	0	0	24 September 2026	
India	1	0	1	0	0	22 September 2026	
vs Associate Members
Bahrain	2	1	0	1	0	26 February 2026	26 February 2026
Bhutan	1	1	0	0	0	27 February 2026	27 February 2026
Cambodia	1	1	0	0	0	27 September 2023	27 September 2023
China	2	2	0	0	0	15 February 2024	15 February 2024
Cook Islands	4	3	1	0	0	9 May 2025	9 May 2025
Fiji	1	1	0	0	0	10 May 2026	10 May 2026
Hong Kong	5	0	5	0	0	1 October 2023	
Indonesia	9	7	2	0	0	9 October 2022	9 October 2022
Kuwait	1	1	0	0	0	9 October 2025	9 October 2025
Maldives	1	1	0	0	0	4 February 2024	4 February 2024
Mongolia	7	6	0	0	1	7 May 2024	7 May 2024
Nepal	2	0	1	0	1	10 October 2025	
Oman	1	0	1	0	0	17 October 2025	
Papua New Guinea	3	1	2	0	0	25 July 2023	18 May 2026
Philippines	5	5	0	0	0	22 July 2023	22 July 2023
Qatar	1	0	1	0	0	15 October 2025	
Samoa	2	2	0	0	0	12 October 2025	12 October 2025
Saudi Arabia	1	0	1	0	0	9 February 2024	
Singapore	2	0	2	0	0	6 February 2024	
South Korea	4	4	0	0	0	15 October 2022	15 October 2022
Thailand	4	3	1	0	0	2 February 2024	2 February 2024
United Arab Emirates	1	0	1	0	0	16 October 2025	
Vanuatu	3	2	1	0	0	23 July 2023	23 July 2023

=== Other matches ===
For a list of selected international matches played by Japan, see Cricket Archive.

== See also ==
- Japan national women's cricket team
- Japan Cricket Association
- Cricket in Japan
- List of Japan Twenty20 International cricketers
- Sano International Cricket Ground
- ICC East Asia-Pacific
