= Cook Islands national cricket team =

Cricket team

Cook Islands
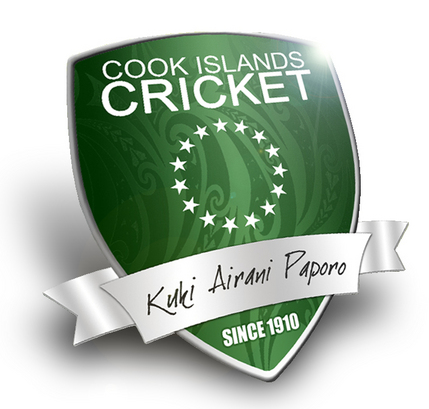
- Nickname: Kukis
- Association: Cook Islands Cricket Association

Personnel
- Captain: Ma'ara Ave

International Cricket Council
- ICC status: Associate member (2017); Affiliate member (2000)
- ICC region: East Asia-Pacific
ICC Rankings	Current	Best-ever
T20I	52nd	45th (19-Aug-2024)

T20 Internationals
- First T20I: v Samoa at Vanuatu Cricket Ground, Port Vila; 9 September 2022
- Last T20I: v Samoa at Sano International Cricket Ground, Sano; 18 May 2026
T20Is	Played	Won/Lost
Total	23	12/11 (0 ties, 0 no result)
This year	6	4/2 (0 ties, 0 no results)
T20I kit
- As of 26 May 2026

The Cook Islands national cricket team is the team that represents the Cook Islands - an island country in a free association with New Zealand - in international cricket. The team is organised by the Cook Islands Cricket Association, which became an affiliate member of the International Cricket Council (ICC) in 2000 and an associate member when all affiliate members were promoted to that status in 2017.

The Cook Islands' first international tournament was the 2001 edition of the Pacifica Cup, which was played in New Zealand. The team has played at ICC East Asia-Pacific tournaments, and at the 2006 EAP Trophy finished second to Fiji and narrowly missed out on qualifying for the World Cricket League. Outside ICC tournaments, the Cook Islands fielded a team in the cricket tournament at the 2003 South Pacific Games, winning the bronze medal.

In April 2018, the ICC decided to grant full Twenty20 International (T20I) status to all its members. Therefore, all Twenty20 matches played between the Cook Islands and other ICC members since 1 January 2019 are eligible for T20I status.

Cook Islands was scheduled to return to international competition at the 2019 Pacific Games in Samoa, but choose not to participate and instead concentrate on development of the national team.

In September 2022 they played the Tāmaki Makaurau Tāne, an all-Māori squad, in Auckland, New Zealand, before participating in the 2022 T20 World Cup East Asia-Pacific Qualifier in Vanuatu. They came third in the qualifiers. Following the competition, they were ranked by the ICC for the first time, at 55th of 82 teams.

== Current squad ==
Team selected for the 2024 T20 Cricket World Cup East Asia Pacific Sub-Regional Qualifying Tournament in Samoa:

- Teaomua Anker
- Ma'ara Ave (c)
- Liam Denny
- Cory Dickson
- Hayden Dickson
- Milton Kavana (vc)
- Aue Parima (wk)
- Thomas Parima
- Pita Ravarua
- Tomakanute Ritawa
- Andrew Samuels
- Oscar Taylor
- Jared Tutty
- Tiaki Wuatai

== Records ==
International Match Summary — Cook Islands

Last updated 18 May 2026

Playing Record
Format	M	W	L	T	NR	Inaugural Match
Twenty20 Internationals	23	12	11	0	0	9 September 2022

=== Twenty20 International ===
T20I record versus other nations

Records complete to T20I #3882. Last updated 18 May 2026.

Opponent	M	W	L	T	NR	First match	First win
vs Associate Members
Fiji	4	1	3	0	0	10 September 2022	14 September 2022
Indonesia	1	1	0	0	0	17 May 2026	17 May 2026
Japan	4	1	3	0	0	9 May 2025	14 May 2026
Papua New Guinea	1	0	1	0	0	10 May 2026	
Samoa	5	3	2	0	0	9 September 2022	13 September 2022
South Korea	1	1	0	0	0	8 May 2026	8 May 2026
Thailand	2	1	1	0	0	7 May 2025	7 May 2025
Vanuatu	5	4	1	0	0	11 September 2022	11 September 2022

=== Other records ===
For a list of selected international matches played by Cook Islands, see Cricket Archive.

== See also ==
- Cricket in the Cook Islands
- List of Cook Islands Twenty20 International cricketers
- Cook Islands women's national cricket team
