= Sano International Cricket Ground =

Cricket ground in Sano, Japan

Coordinates: 36.357592°N 139.592318°E

Sano Cricket Ground
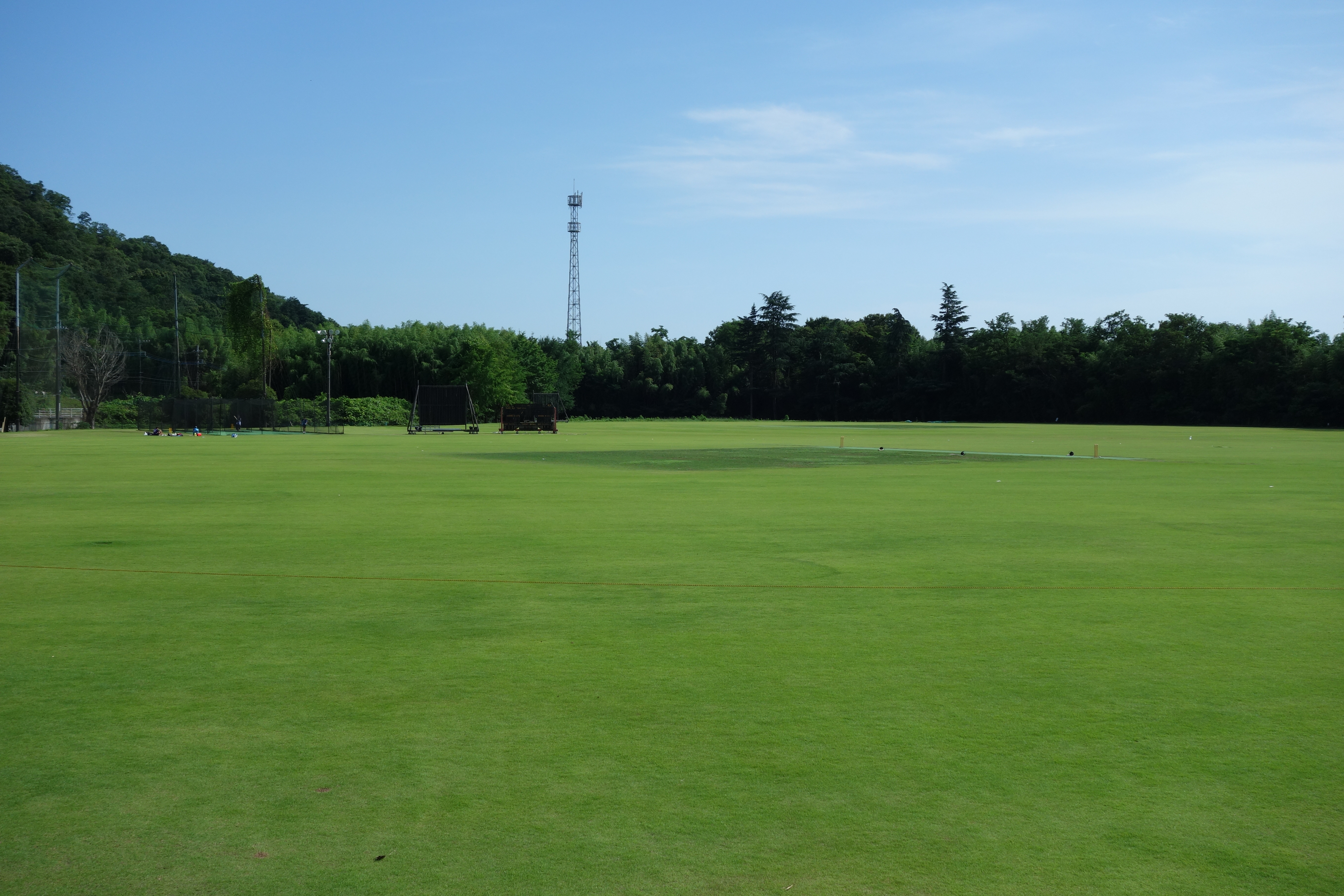
- Interactive map of Sano Cricket Ground

Ground information
- Location: 300-1 Tochimoto-cho Sano, Tochigi-ken 327-0312 Japan
- Country: Japan
- Establishment: 2009 (first recorded match)
- Capacity: 2,000
- Owner: Japan Cricket Association
- Tenants: Japan
- End names
- High School End; Mountain End

International information
- First men's T20I: 9 October 2022: Japan v Indonesia
- Last men's T20I: 22nd September 2026: India v Japan
- First women's T20I: 1 October 2024: Japan v Singapore
- Last women's T20I: 6 October 2024: Japan v Singapore
- As of 18 May 2026; Source: Ground profile

Sano International Cricket Ground 2
- Sano International Cricket Ground - Tanuma
- Interactive map of Sano International Cricket Ground 2

Ground information
- Location: Sano, Tochigi-ken, Japan
- Country: Japan
- Capacity: n/a
- Owner: Japan Cricket Association
- Tenants: Japan
- End names
- n/a n/a

International information
- First men's T20I: 12 May 2026: South Korea v Philippines
- Last men's T20I: 22 September 2026: India v Japan
- As of 22 September 2026; Source: Sano International Cricket Ground 2

Sano Cricket Ground is a cricket ground in Sano, Japan. The ground is one of the few facilities in Japan that is used for cricket. The pitch is made of plastic carpet and is in pretty good condition. The ground is also used for baseball.

The stadium is the headquarters of the Japan Cricket Association and has hosted a number of cricket games between international teams.

== History ==
On March 22, 2016, Sano City Council announced that the Tanuma High School Ground would become the Sano International Cricket Ground, Japan's first dedicated cricketing venue, which would no longer have to compete with other sports for usage. The ground hosted the first ever East Asia Cup, which included the national teams of China and South Korea as well as Hong Kong Dragons (an all-Chinese development team) and the host Japan.

In June 2019, the ground hosted the matches in the East Asia Pacific qualification tournament for the 2020 Under-19 Cricket World Cup. After Papua New Guinea forfeited the last match, the Japan national under-19 cricket team won the tournament and qualified for its first-ever World Cup appearance.

Sano was the venue for a T20I series between Malaysia Women and Japan Women in 2026.

India played their first ever international match against Japan at the Sano ground on 22 September 2026. While the Twenty20 match was officially held to mark 75 years of diplomatic relations between Japan and India, it was also a warm-up match for the men's cricket tournament in the 2026 Asian Games. In a "thrilling" and close contest shortened by rain, India won the match by 2 runs.

== See also ==
- Cricket in Japan
- Japan men's national cricket team
- Japan women's national cricket team
- Japan Cricket Association
- ICC East Asia-Pacific
- Asian Cricket Council
