= Indonesia national cricket team =

Indonesia
- Association: Cricket Indonesia

Personnel
- Captain: Kadek Gamantika

International Cricket Council
- ICC status: Associate member (2017); Affiliate member (2001)
- ICC region: Asia / East Asia-Pacific
ICC Rankings	Current	Best-ever
T20I	66th	47th (23-Nov-2022)

International cricket
- First international: v South Korea at Perth; 25 February 2002

T20 Internationals
- First T20I: v Japan at Sano International Cricket Ground, Sano; 9 October 2022
- Last T20I: v South Korea at Yeonhui Cricket Ground, Incheon; 5 October 2026
T20Is	Played	Won/Lost
Total	119	51/65 (1 tie, 2 no results)
This year	25	4/21 (0 ties, 0 no results)
T20I first kit
T20I second kit
T20I third kit
- As of 5 October 2026

The Indonesia national cricket team is the men's team that represents the country of Indonesia in international cricket. Cricket in Indonesia is governed by Cricket Indonesia (formerly the Indonesia Cricket Foundation). Cricket Indonesia became an affiliate member of the International Cricket Council (ICC) in 2001 and an associate member in 2017.

Cricket Indonesia is charged with the promotion and development of cricket in Indonesia, and is a member of the ICC East Asia-Pacific (EAP) development region. In 2006, the organisation announced their intention to join the Asian Cricket Council (ACC), and were originally included in the draw for the ACC Trophy, although their ACC membership application was rejected and they did not take part in the tournament. Indonesia was admitted to the ACC in January 2024.

The Indonesian national team made its international debut in 2002, at a tournament in Perth, Australia, that also included Japan and South Korea. The team's first ICC event was the 2005 EAP Cup in Vanuatu, where it placed fifth out of six teams. Indonesia has since regularly participated in EAP regional tournaments. At 2014 EAP Championship, the most recent such event, Indonesia placed seventh out of eight teams, in front of only the Cook Islands.

In April 2018, the ICC decided to grant full Twenty20 International (T20I) status to all its members. Therefore, all Twenty20 matches played between Indonesia and other ICC members after 1 January 2019 have the full T20I status. The current Indonesia women's national cricket team is ranked 21st in the world while the Men's are 56th as of April 2023.

== History ==
=== 21st century ===
Since the Indonesian Cricket Foundation (now Cricket Indonesia) was formed in 2000, Indonesia have played in several regional tournaments in the East Asia-Pacific region. Including the East-Asia Pacific Challenge in 2004, and in the 2005 ICC EAP Cricket Cup.

In August 2017, Indonesia Men's team won a bronze medal in the 20-over tournament in cricket at the 2017 Southeast Asian Games. They also played in the 50-over tournament, but lost all four matches (including to Myanmar, giving that country its first victory in international cricket).

In February 2023, it was announced that Indonesia and Japan would be included in Asian Cricket Council (ACC) pathway events, while remaining in the ICC East Asia-Pacific development region. Indonesia was formally admitted to ACC membership in January 2024, along with Japan.

Cricket has been played in Indonesia since the Dutch colonial period, with expatriate communities organizing matches in Jakarta and other cities. However, it was not until the late 1990s that a national governing body, the Persatuan Cricket Indonesia (PCI), began organizing structured domestic competitions.

PCI was officially established in 2000 and became an Associate Member of the International Cricket Council (ICC) in 2001. In the early 2000s, Indonesia began participating in regional events such as the ACC Trophy and ICC East Asia-Pacific tournaments.

Since 2022, Indonesia has accelerated its cricketing growth through revitalized administration, youth development, and strategic partnerships. The national U-19 women's team made history in 2022 by qualifying for the 2023 ICC U-19 Women’s T20 World Cup held in South Africa — the country’s first-ever appearance in an ICC global tournament.

In 2023, Indonesia's national teams won four medals at the Southeast Asian Games in Cambodia, including a historic gold in the women’s 6-a-side cricket event.

== Governing body ==
The Indonesian Cricket Association (Persatuan Cricket Indonesia, PCI) is the official governing body for cricket in Indonesia. It was established in 2000 and gained Associate Member status from the International Cricket Council (ICC) in 2001. PCI is also affiliated with the Asian Cricket Council (ACC) and oversees cricket development in 21 active provincial regions.

In January 2023, Abhiram Singh Yadav was elected as Chairman of PCI for the 2023–2027 period, bringing a strategic shift to the organization’s governance and operations. The new leadership introduced a five-year development roadmap focused on five strategic pillars:

- Building elite high-performance pathways through structured national talent pools
- Expanding gender-inclusive cricket via school outreach, women’s leagues, and Kartini Cup series
- Establishing sustainable domestic leagues and talent pipelines across 21 provinces
- Investing in ICC-compliant infrastructure, including turf pitches and digital scoring systems
- Forming international partnerships with WACA (Western Australia Cricket Association), Cricket Australia, and ICC EAP

To ensure long-term sustainability, PCI has also implemented internal governance reforms including transparent budgeting, KPI-based staff performance evaluations, a “Second Circle” youth leadership initiative, and the establishment of the Garuda National Cricket Academy (GNCA).

PCI represents Indonesia at ICC regional forums, contributes to global cricket development policies, and leads efforts to position Indonesia as a future ICC full member nation.

== Recent Achievements ==
Indonesia has emerged as one of the fastest-growing cricket nations in Southeast Asia. A key milestone was achieved in 2022 when the Indonesian U-19 Women's team qualified for the inaugural ICC U-19 Women's T20 World Cup in South Africa — marking the country's first-ever qualification for an ICC global event.

The team featured standout player Rohmalia, a young cricketer from Banten, who played a crucial role in the qualification campaign. She later became the first Indonesian woman to bowl in an ICC World Cup match, setting a national record.

At the 2023 Southeast Asian Games in Cambodia, Indonesia secured four cricket medals:

- Gold – Women’s 6-a-side
- Silver – Women’s T10
- Silver – Men’s T10
- Bronze – Men’s 6-a-side

These results marked Indonesia's best-ever performance in regional multi-sport competition and significantly raised the profile of the national teams.

Indonesia has since hosted and competed in several international series, including:

- **Bali Bash International** – featuring teams from Asia and the Pacifics

Additionally, Indonesian umpires and coaches have begun participating in ICC-accredited development programs through partnerships with Cricket Australia and WACA, strengthening technical capacity and officiating standards nationwide.

== Grounds ==
Location of international cricket matches played in Indonesia

== Tournaments ==
=== ACC Challenger Cup ===
- 2024: 6th place

=== World Cricket League EAP region ===
- 2005: ICC EAP Cricket Cup 5th
- 2007: ICC EAP Cricket Trophy 6th
- 2009: ICC EAP Cricket Trophy Division Two 5th
- 2011: ICC EAP Cricket Trophy Division Two 6th
- 2018: 2018–19 ICC T20 World Cup East Asia-Pacific Qualifier

== Current squad ==
Updated as of 6 May 2024

This lists all the players who played for Indonesia in the 2024 Thailand tour of Indonesia.

Name	Age	Batting style	Bowling style	Notes
Batters
Anjar Tadarus	41	Right-handed	Right-arm medium	
Gede Priandana	27	Right-handed	Right-arm medium	
Dharma Kesuma	27	Right-handed		
Padmakar Surve	45	Right-handed	Right-arm medium	
Kirubasankar Ramamoorthy	36	Right-handed	Right-arm off break	
All-rounders
Kadek Gamantika	31	Right-handed	Right-arm off break	Captain
Ferdinando Banunaek	24	Right-handed	Right-arm medium	
Gede Arta	38	Left-handed	Left-arm medium	
Gaurav Tiwari	33	Right-handed	Right-arm off break	
Wicket-keeper
Ahmad Ramdoni	41	Right-handed		
Spin Bowler
Ketut Artawan	26	Right-handed	Right-arm leg break	
Pace Bowlers
Danilson Hawoe	25	Right-handed	Right-arm medium	
Maxi Koda	32	Right-handed	Right-arm medium	
Wayan Budiarta	33	Right-handed	Right-arm medium	

== Records ==
International Match Summary — Indonesia

Last updated 5 October 2026

Playing Record
Format	M	W	L	T	NR	Inaugural Match
Twenty20 Internationals	119	51	65	1	2	9 October 2022

=== Twenty20 Internationals ===
- Highest team total: 192/1 v. Myanmar on 12 November 2024 at Udayana Cricket Ground, Jimbaran, and 192/7 v. Cambodia on 21 November 2023 at Udayana Cricket Ground, Jimbaran.
- Highest individual score: 117*, Dharma Kesuma v. Myanmar on 12 November 2024 at Udayana Cricket Ground, Jimbaran.
- Best individual bowling figures: 5/8, Anjar Tadarus v. South Korea on 9 July 2025 at Udayana Cricket Ground, Jimbaran.

T20I record versus other nations

Records complete to T20I #4161. Last updated 5 October 2026.

Opponent	M	W	L	T	NR	First match	First win
vs Associate Members
Bahrain	8	1	7	0	0	19 February 2025	22 February 2025
Bhutan	3	1	2	0	0	1 February 2024	1 February 2024
Cambodia	24	14	8	0	2	20 November 2023	20 November 2023
Cook Islands	1	0	1	0	0	17 May 2026	
Japan	9	2	7	0	0	9 October 2022	11 October 2022
Malaysia	6	0	6	0	0	2 May 2023	
Maldives	1	0	1	0	0	19 October 2024	
Myanmar	10	10	0	0	0	12 November 2024	12 November 2024
Papua New Guinea	1	0	1	0	0	14 May 2026	
Philippines	14	5	8	1	0	22 December 2023	23 December 2023
Samoa	1	0	1	0	0	9 May 2026	
Saudi Arabia	1	0	1	0	0	5 February 2024	
Singapore	3	0	3	0	0	11 May 2023	
South Korea	12	7	5	0	0	15 October 2022	15 October 2022
Sweden	8	1	7	0	0	7 April 2026	13 April 2026
Thailand	10	4	6	0	0	1 May 2023	1 May 2023
Timor-Leste	4	4	0	0	0	6 November 2025	6 November 2025
Uzbekistan	2	2	0	0	0	23 June 2026	
Vanuatu	1	0	1	0	0	16 May 2026	

=== Other matches ===
For a list of selected international matches played by Indonesia, see Cricket Archive.

== See also ==
- Indonesia women's national cricket team
- Cricket Indonesia
- List of Indonesia Twenty20 International cricketers
