= 2024 Men's T20 World Cup East Asia-Pacific Sub-regional Qualifier A =

Qualification tournament for the 2026 T20WC in EAP region

2024 ICC Men's T20 World Cup East Asia-Pacific Sub-regional Qualifier A
- Dates: 17 – 24 August 2024
- Administrator: ICC East Asia-Pacific
- Cricket format: Twenty20 International
- Tournament format: Double round-robin
- Host: Samoa
- Champions: Samoa
- Runners-up: Cook Islands
- Participants: 4
- Matches: 12
- Most runs: (Samoa) Darius Visser (265)
- Most wickets: (Cook Islands) Oscar Taylor (17)

The 2024 ICC Men's T20 World Cup East Asia-Pacific Sub-regional Qualifier A was a cricket tournament that formed part of the qualification process for the 2026 Men's T20 World Cup. It was hosted by Samoa in August 2024.

The winners of the tournament, Samoa advanced to the regional final, where they were joined by Nepal, Oman, and Papua New Guinea, who were given a bye after having participated in the previous T20 World Cup, and four other teams from Asia qualifiers along with the winners of EAP qualifier B.

== Squads ==
| Cook Islands | Fiji | Samoa | Vanuatu |
|---|---|---|---|
| Ma'ara Ave (c, wk); Milton Kavana (vc); Teaomua Anker; Liam Denny; Cory Dickson; Hayden Dickson; Aue Parima (wk); Thomas Parima; Pita Ravarua; Tomakanute Ritawa; Andrew Samuels; Oscar Taylor; Jared Tutty; Tiaki Wuatai | Peni Vuniwaqa (c); Metuisela Beitaki (wk); Josaia Cama; Peni Dakainivanua; Peni Katoisuva; Kau Qalo; Joeli Qalobula; Anish Shah; Tevita Soko; Apete Sokovagone; Siteri Tabuisulu; Dawson Tawake; James Vulisere; Sunia Yalimaiwai | Caleb Jasmat (c); Daniel Burgess; Sean Cotter; Douglas Finau; Afapene Ilaoa (wk); Emmanuel Lemana; Noah Mead; Tineimoli Misi; Solomon Nash; Darren Roache; Punapunavale Sua; Fereti Suluoto; Saumani Tiai; Darius Visser | Joshua Rasu (c); Tim Cutler; Junior Kaltapau; Andrew Mansale; Williamsing Nalisa; Nalin Nipiko; Simpson Obed; Apolinaire Stephen; Kenny Tari; Ronald Tari; Clement Tommy (wk); Bettan Viraliliu (wk); Darren Wotu; Womanjo Wotu |

== Points table ==
Qualifier A standings
| Pos | Team | Pld | W | L | NR | Pts | NRR | Qualification |
|---|---|---|---|---|---|---|---|---|
| 1 | Samoa (H) | 6 | 4 | 2 | 0 | 8 | 1.270 | Advanced to the regional final |
| 2 | Cook Islands | 6 | 4 | 2 | 0 | 8 | −0.008 | Eliminated |
| 3 | Fiji | 6 | 3 | 3 | 0 | 6 | −0.858 | Eliminated |
| 4 | Vanuatu | 6 | 1 | 5 | 0 | 2 | −0.306 | Eliminated |

Source: ESPNcricinfo
(H) Host

== Fixtures ==
17 August 2024
09:30
Scorecard

| Vanuatu; 180/5 (20 overs) | v | Cook Islands; 186/1 (18.1 overs) |
| Andrew Mansale 64 (40); Oscar Taylor 2/30 (3 overs) | | Hayden Dickson 112* (57); Joshua Rasu 1/31 (4 overs) |

Cook Islands won by 9 wickets
Faleata Oval 2, Apia
Umpires: Kim Cotton (NZ) and Phillip Gillespie (Aus)
Player of the match: Hayden Dickson (Cok)

- Cook Islands won the toss and elected to field.
- Milton Kavana, Andrew Samuels, Oscar Taylor and Jared Tutty (Cok) all made their T20I debuts.
- Hayden Dickson became the first player for Cook Islands to score a century in T20Is.

17 August 2024
13:30
Scorecard

| Fiji; 62 (14 overs) | v | Samoa; 63/1 (5.1 overs) |
| Apete Sokovagone 19 (15); Darius Visser 4/11 (4 overs) | | Darius Visser 30* (12); Anish Shah 1/32 (3 overs) |

Samoa won by 9 wickets
Faleata Oval 2, Apia
Umpires: Lisa McCabe (Aus) and Lakani Oala (PNG)
Player of the match: Darius Visser (Sam)

- Fiji won the toss and elected to bat.
- Noah Mead, Solomon Nash, Punapunavale Sua, Darius Visser (Sam), Josaia Cama, James Junior, Joeli Moala, Anish Shah, Apete Sokovagone and Dawson Tawake (Fij) all made their T20I debuts.

19 August 2024
09:30
Scorecard

| Samoa; 104 (18.3 overs) | v | Cook Islands; 105/3 (14.5 overs) |
| Caleb Jasmat 42* (32); Oscar Taylor 3/36 (3.3 overs) | | Cory Dickson 30* (27); Saumani Tiai 2/13 (4 overs) |

Cook Islands won by 7 wickets
Faleata Oval 2, Apia
Umpires: Phillip Gillespie (Aus) and Merielle Kenni (Van)
Player of the match: Cory Dickson (Cok)

- Cook Islands won the toss and elected to field.

19 August 2024
13:30
Scorecard

| Vanuatu; 157/4 (20 overs) | v | Fiji; 121/9 (20 overs) |
| Andrew Mansale 82 (50); Peni Kotoisuva 1/9 (2 overs) | | Peni Vuniwaqa 30 (21); Williamsing Nalisa 6/16 (4 overs) |

Vanuatu won by 36 runs
Faleata Oval 2, Apia
Umpires: Kim Cotton (NZ) and Lisa McCabe (Aus)
Player of the match: Andrew Mansale (Van)

- Fiji won the toss and elected to field.
- Williamsing Nalisa (Van) took his first five wicket-haul in T20Is.

20 August 2024
09:30
Scorecard

| Samoa; 174 (20 overs) | v | Vanuatu; 164/9 (20 overs) |
| Darius Visser 132 (62); Tim Cutler 3/11 (4 overs) | | Nalin Nipiko 73 (52); Douglas Finau 3/34 (4 overs) |

Samoa won by 10 runs
Faleata Oval 2, Apia
Umpires: Phillip Gillespie (Aus) and Lakani Oala (Png)
Player of the match: Darius Visser (Sam)

- Samoa won the toss and elected to bat.
- Tineimoli Misi (Sam) made his T20I debut.
- Darius Visser became the first player for Samoa to score a century in T20Is, and became the fourth player to hit six sixes in an over in T20Is.
- Samoa set a record for the most runs off an over in men's T20Is (39).

20 August 2024
13:30
Scorecard

| Fiji; 173/7 (20 overs) | v | Cook Islands; 69/9 (20 overs) |
| Apete Sokovagone 62 (37); Oscar Taylor 3/25 (3 overs) | | Andrew Samuels 11* (23); Peni Dakainivanua 3/11 (4 overs) |

Fiji won by 104 runs
Faleata Oval 2, Apia
Umpires: Merielle Kenni (Van) and Lisa McCabe (Aus)
Player of the match: Apete Sokovagone (Fij)

- Cook Islands won the toss and elected to field.
- Tiaki Wuatai (Cok) and Sunia Yalimaiwai (Fij) both made their T20I debut.

21 August 2024
09:30
Scorecard

| Samoa; 183/5 (20 overs) | v | Fiji; 110 (15.3 overs) |
| Darius Visser 72 (39); Peni Katoisuva 2/25 (3 overs) | | Peni Vuniwaqa 39 (23); Saumani Tiai 5/27 (3.3 overs) |

Samoa won by 73 runs
Faleata Oval 2, Apia
Umpires: Kim Cotton (NZ) and Merielle Kenni (Van)
Player of the match: Darius Visser (Sam)

- Fiji won the toss and elected to field.
- Saumani Tiai (Sam) took his first five wicket-haul in T20Is.

21 August 2024
13:30
Scorecard

| Vanuatu; 125/9 (20 overs) | v | Cook Islands; 127/3 (16.2 overs) |
| Nalin Nipiko 38 (31); Oscar Taylor 5/17 (4 overs) | | Ma'ara Ave 44* (32); Tim Cutler 1/21 (4 overs) |

Cook Islands won by 7 wickets
Faleata Oval 2, Apia
Umpires: Lisa McCabe (Aus) and Lakani Oala (Png)
Player of the match: Oscar Taylor (Cok)

- Cook Islands won the toss and elected to field.
- Pita Ravarua (Cok) made his T20I debut.
- Oscar Taylor (Cok) took his first five wicket-haul in T20Is.

23 August 2024
09:30
Scorecard

| Vanuatu; 168/6 (20 overs) | v | Fiji; 169/5 (19.5 overs) |
| Joshua Rasu 43 (28); Joeli Moala 3/29 (4 overs) | | Apete Sokovagone 46 (37); Joshua Rasu 2/25 (4 overs) |

Fiji won by 5 wickets
Faleata Oval 2, Apia
Umpires: Lisa McCabe (Aus) and Lakani Oala (Png)
Player of the match: Peni Vuniwaqa (Fij)

- Vanuatu won the toss and elected to bat.
- Kau Qalo (Fij) and Kenny Tari (Van) both made their T20I debuts.

23 August 2024
13:30
Scorecard

| Samoa; 169/4 (20 overs) | v | Cook Islands; 170/2 (16.5 overs) |
| Darren Roache 55 (34); Oscar Taylor 3/39 (4 overs) | | Thomas Parima 104 (52); Darius Visser 1/20 (3 overs) |

Cook Islands won by 8 wickets
Faleata Oval 2, Apia
Umpires: Kim Cotton (NZ) and Merielle Kenni (Van)
Player of the match: Thomas Parima (Cok)

- Samoa won the toss and elected to bat.
- Thomas Parima (Cok) scored his first century in T20Is.

24 August 2024
09:30
Scorecard

| Fiji; 135/9 (20 overs) | v | Cook Islands; 126/9 (20 overs) |
| Peni Vuniwaqa 45 (28); Cory Dickson 3/21 (4 overs) | | Aue Parima 57 (39); Joeli Moala 3/21 (4 overs) |

Fiji won by 9 runs
Faleata Oval 2, Apia
Umpires: Merielle Kenni (Van) and Lakani Oala (PNG)
Player of the match: Peni Vuniwaqa (Fij)

- Cook Islands won the toss and elected to field.
- Teaomua Anker (Cok) made his T20I debut.

24 August 2024
13:30
Scorecard

| Samoa; 145/8 (20 overs) | v | Vanuatu; 137/9 (20 overs) |
| Sean Cotter 51 (48); Apolinaire Stephen 2/26 (4 overs) | | Bettan Viraliliu 39 (30); Saumani Tiai 4/23 (4 overs) |

Samoa won by 8 runs
Faleata Oval 2, Apia
Umpires: Kim Cotton (NZ) and Phillip Gillespie (Aus)
Player of the match: Saumani Tiai (Sam)

- Samoa won the toss and elected to bat.
