= Boundary (cricket) =

Outer perimeter of the playing field

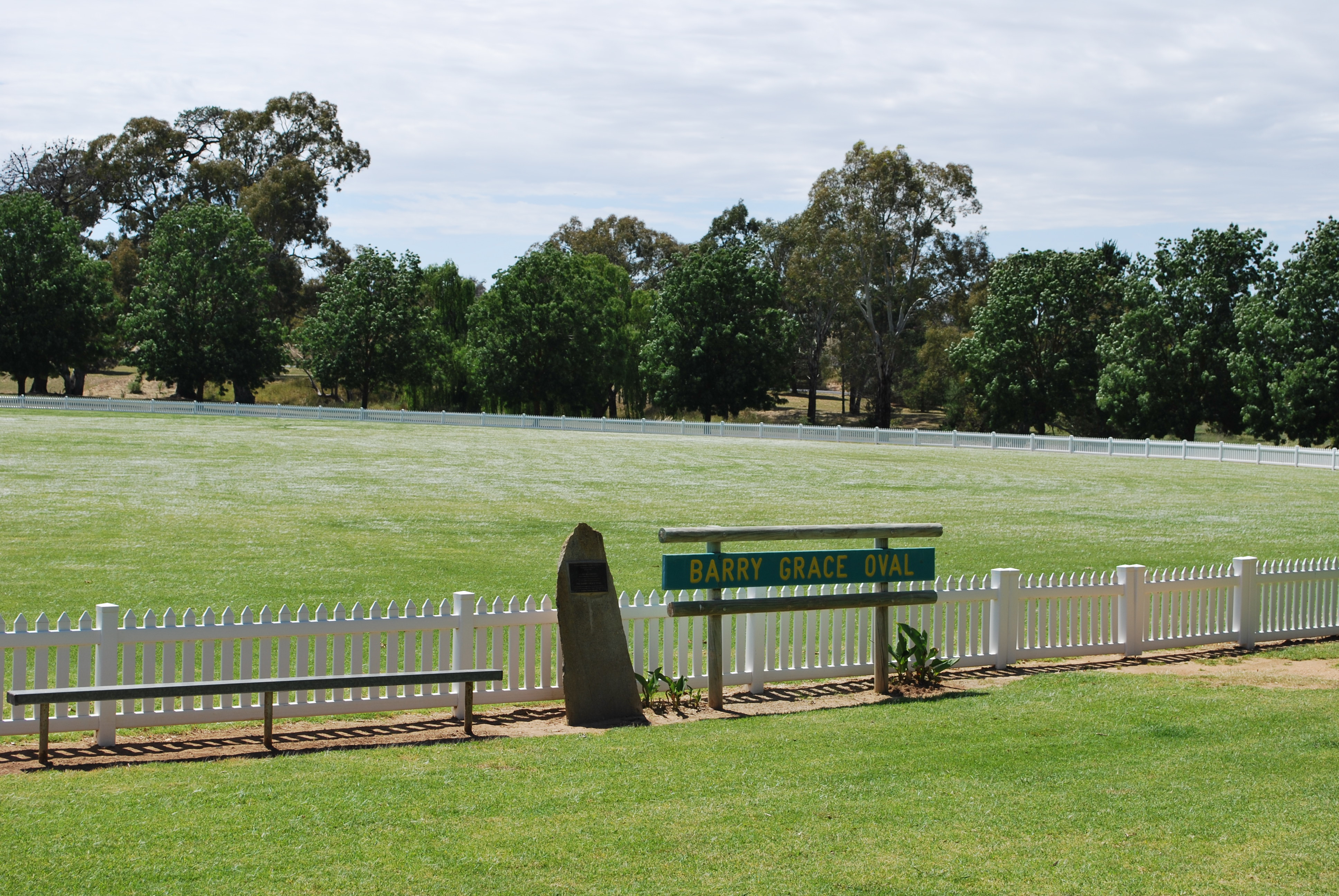
A cricket oval in Wallendbeen, New South Wales, with a white picket fence, traditionally used as the boundary

In cricket, the boundary is the perimeter of a playing field. It is also the term given to a scoring shot where the ball is hit to, or beyond, that perimeter, which generally earns four or six runs for the batting team.

Briefly, if the ball is struck by the batter and rolls or bounces over the boundary (or just touches it) it is known as a "four", and scores four runs, whereas if it flies over (or touches) the boundary, without touching the ground before that, it is called a "six", and scores six runs. There are rules covering every possible situation, including the fairly common one when a fielder is in the air beyond the boundary when they catch or strike the ball with their hand or another part of the body.

== Edge of the field ==
The boundary is the edge of the playing field, or the physical object (often a rope) marking the edge of the field. In low-level matches, a series of plastic cones or flags are sometimes used. Since the early 2000s, the boundaries at professional matches are often a series of padded cushions carrying sponsors' logos strung along a rope. If one of these is accidentally moved during play (such as by a fielder sliding into the rope in an attempt to stop the ball) the boundary is considered to remain at the point where that object first stood. The boundary is at least 195 feet (59 m) from the centre of the field in men's international cricket, and at least 180 feet (55 m) from the centre of the field in women's international cricket.

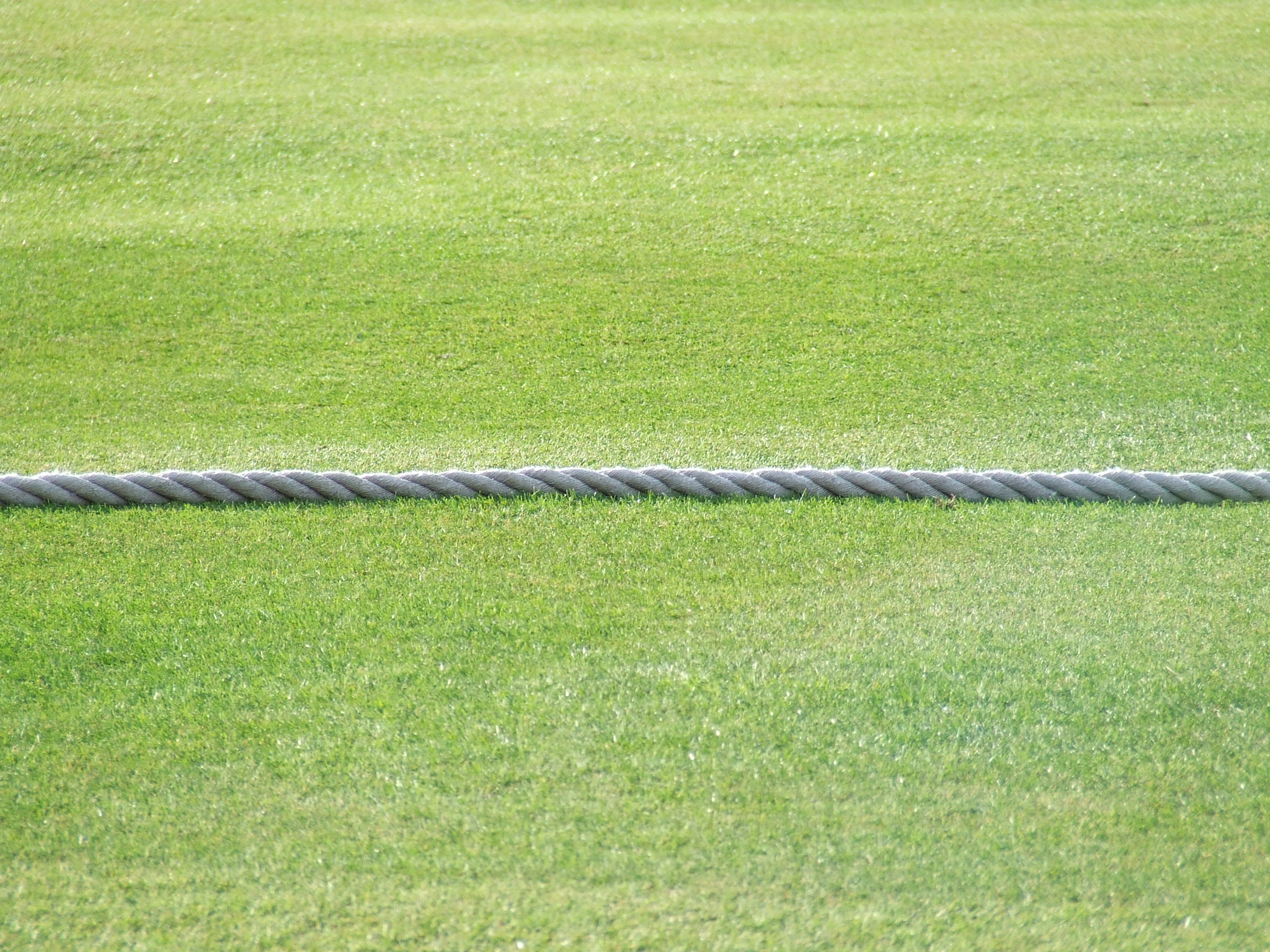
A traditional boundary rope

When the cricket ball is inside the boundary, it is live. When the ball is touching the boundary, grounded beyond the boundary, or being touched by a fielder who is himself either touching the boundary or grounded beyond it, it is dead and the batting side usually scores four or six runs for hitting the ball over the boundary. Because of this rule, fielders near the boundary attempting to intercept the ball while running or diving often flick the ball back in to the field of play rather than pick it up directly, because their momentum could carry them beyond the rope while holding the ball. They then return to the field to pick the ball up and throw it back to the bowler.

A law change in 2010 declared that a fielder could not jump from behind the boundary and, while airborne, parry the ball back on to the field.

== Scoring runs ==
A boundary is the scoring of four or six runs from a single delivery, with the ball having left the field, and its first bounce having occurred either entirely within the playing field (in the case of four runs) or not (six runs); these events are known as a four or a six, respectively.

Occasionally, there is an erroneous use of the term boundary as a synonym for a "four". For example, a commentator saying: "There were seven boundaries and three sixes in the innings." The correct terminology would be "There were ten boundaries in the innings of which seven were fours and three were sixes."

When this happens the runs are automatically added to the batsman's and his team's score and the ball becomes dead. If the ball did not touch the bat or a hand holding the bat, four runs are scored as the relevant type of extra instead; six runs cannot be scored as extras, even if the ball clears the boundary, which is in any case extremely unlikely.

Any runs the batsmen completed by running before the ball reached the edge of the field do not count, unless they are greater than the number of runs that would be scored by the boundary, in which case it is the runs from the boundary that are discounted.

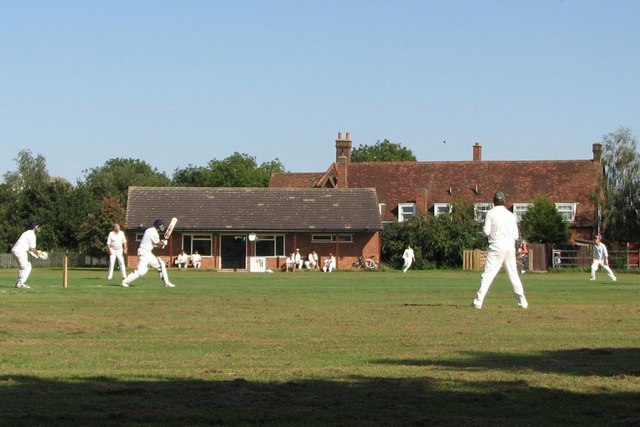
A batsman scoring a six during a game at Chrishall, Essex

The scoring of a four or six by a good aggressive shot displays a certain amount of mastery by the batsman over the bowler, and is usually greeted by applause from the spectators. Fours resulting from an edged stroke, or from a shot that did not come off as the batsman intended, are considered bad luck to the bowler. As a batsman plays himself in and becomes more confident as his innings progresses, the proportion of his runs scored in boundaries often rises.

An average first-class match usually sees between 50 and 150 boundary fours. Sixes are less common, and usually fewer than 10 (and sometimes none) will be scored in the course of a match.

The Laws allow for captains to change the boundary allowances (number of runs scored through either type of boundary) through a pre-match agreement.

=== Four runs ===
Four runs are scored if the ball bounces, or rolls along the ground, before touching or going over the edge of the field. If it does not touch the edge of the field, it must touch the ground beyond it. For example, if a batsman hits the ball and it bounces before the boundary and carries over the boundary in flight, a fielder can still bring the ball back into the field of play as long as any part of the fielder's body does not touch the ground outside of the boundary.

Four runs are scored as overthrows if a fielder gathers the ball and then throws it so that no other fielder can gather it before it reaches the boundary. In this case, the batsman who hit the ball scores however many runs the batsmen had run up to that time, plus four additional runs, and it is counted as a boundary. If the ball has not come off the bat or hand holding the bat, then the runs are classified as 'extras' and are added to the team's score but not to the score of any individual batsman.

Four runs (or more) can also be scored by hitting the ball into the outfield and running between the wickets. Four runs scored in this way is referred to as an "all run four" and is not counted as a boundary.

=== Six runs ===
Six runs are scored if the ball does not bounce before passing over the boundary in the air, and then touches the boundary or the ground beyond it.

Prior to 1910, six runs were only awarded for hits out of the ground, with custom in Australia to award five runs for clearing the boundary.

== Records ==
=== Sixes ===
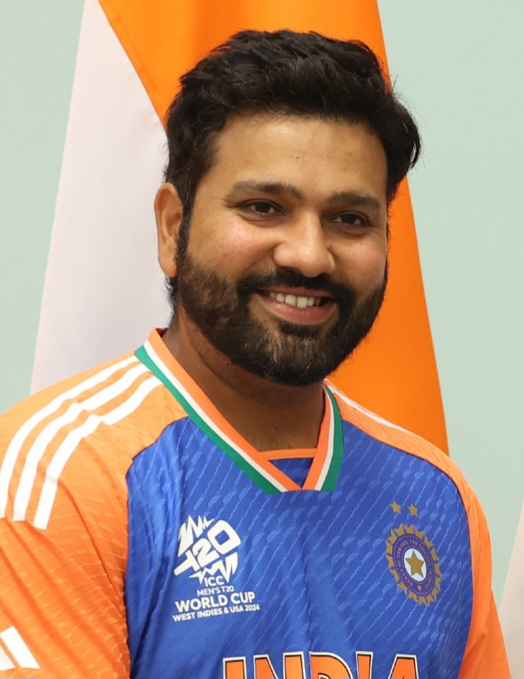
Rohit Sharma holds the world record for most sixes in ODIs.

The record for most sixes by an individual in a Test match innings is 12, which was first achieved by Pakistani all-rounder Wasim Akram during an innings of 257 not out against Zimbabwe in October 1996 at Sheikhupura, and was later equalled by Yashasvi Jaiswal during an innings of 214 against England in February 2024 at Rajkot. The One Day International record for most sixes hit in an innings by an individual is held by Eoin Morgan, who hit 17 sixes against Afghanistan at Old Trafford on 18 June 2019 in his innings of 148. Ben Stokes currently holds the record for most sixes in a Test career with 131. Shahid Afridi holds the record for most sixes in an ODI career with 351 sixes in 398 matches.

Although official records for the longest six do not exist due to the difficulties of accurately measuring such distances, there is some evidence to show Australia’s Brett Lee struck a six about 135 meters against West Indies in a Test match at the Gabba in 2005, although he used a carbon fibre–reinforced bat, which was later banned.

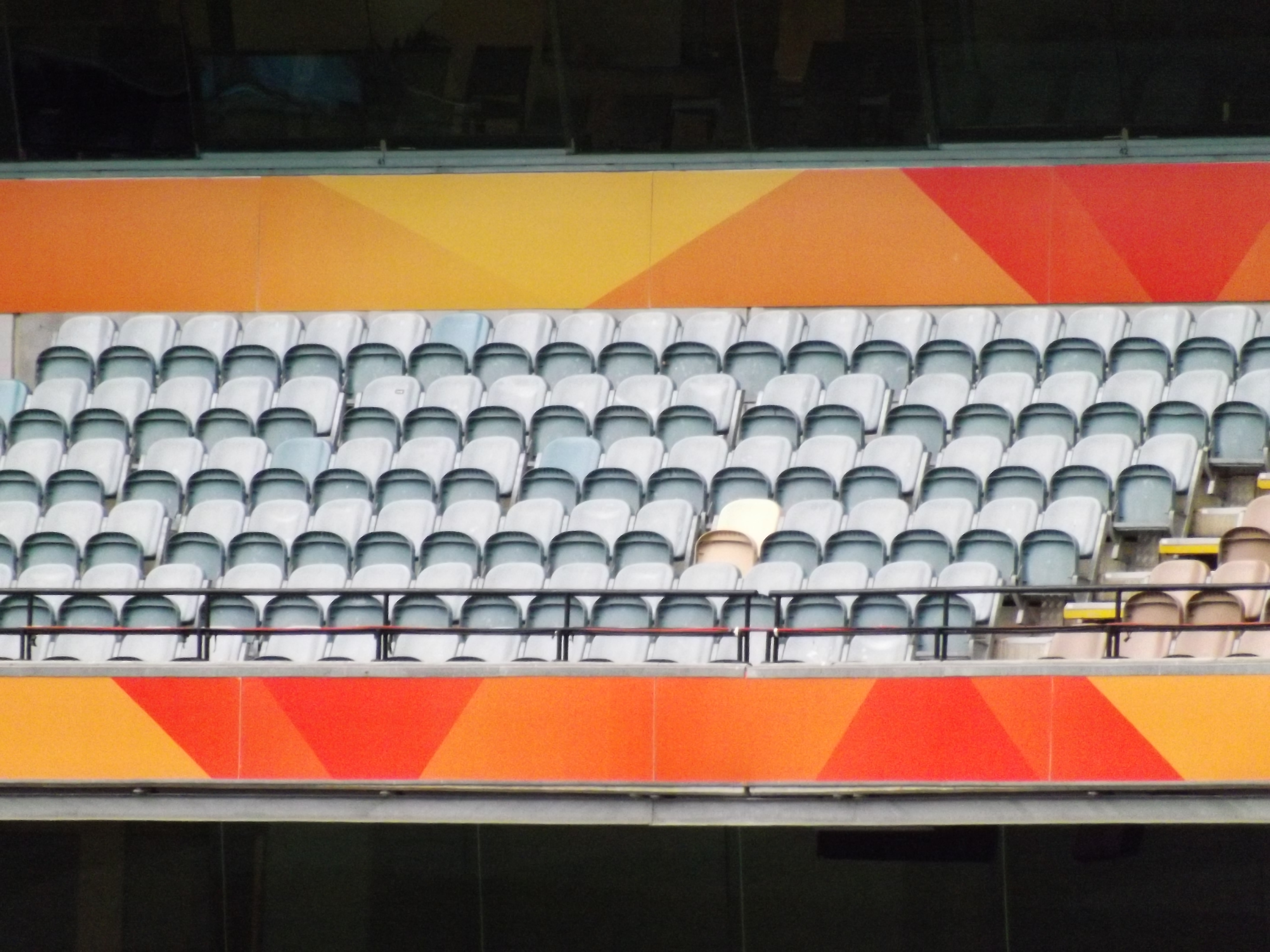
At the MCG a yellow seat marks the biggest six hit at the ground.

The record for the most sixes in a Test match is 37, which occurred during a 2019 Test match between India and South Africa in Visakhapatnam.

The record for most sixes in a One Day International is 46, which was achieved in a match between West Indies and England at St George's on 27 February 2019. The equivalent record in Twenty20 Internationals was set at Centurion Park, 35 sixes were hit during a match between South Africa and West Indies on 26 March 2023.

In 2012, during the First Test against Bangladesh in Dhaka, West Indies cricketer Chris Gayle became the first player to hit a six off the first ball in a Test cricket match.

=== Six or more sixes in an over ===
==== Six or more sixes in an over in top level domestic cricket ====
As of November 2025, this feat has occurred eight times in top level domestic cricket.

Date	Batsman	Team	Bowler	Opposition	Venue	Format	Tournament/series	Notes
31 August 1968	Garfield Sobers	Nottinghamshire	Malcolm Nash	Glamorgan	St Helen's, Swansea	FC	1968 County Championship	
10 January 1985	Ravi Shastri	Bombay	Tilak Raj	Baroda	Wankhede Stadium, Mumbai	FC	1984–85 Ranji Trophy	
23 July 2017	Ross Whiteley	Worcestershire	Karl Carver	Yorkshire	Headingley, Leeds	T20	2017 NatWest T20 Blast	
14 October 2018	Hazratullah Zazai	Kabul Zwanan	Abdullah Mazari	Balkh Legends	Sharjah Cricket Stadium, Sharjah	T20	Gulbahar Afghanistan Premier League T20 2018	
5 January 2020	Leo Carter	Canterbury Kings	Anton Devcich	Northern Knights	Hagley Oval, Christchurch	T20	2019–20 Dream11 Super Smash	
29 March 2021	Thisara Perera	Sri Lanka Army Sports Club	Dilhan Cooray	Bloomfield Cricket and Athletic Club	Army Ground, Panagoda	List A	2020–21 Major Clubs Limited Over Tournament	
28 November 2022	Ruturaj Gaikwad	Maharashtra	Shiva Singh	Uttar Pradesh	Sardar Vallabhbhai Patel Stadium, Ahmedabad	List A	2022–23 Vijay Hazare Trophy	
9 November 2025	Akash Choudhary	Meghalaya	Limar Dabi	Arunachal Pradesh	Pithwala Stadium, Surat	FC	2025–26 Ranji Trophy	

==== Six or more sixes in an over in international cricket ====
As of May 2026, this feat has occurred eight times in international cricket. No batter has achieved this feat in Tests.

Date	Batsman	Bowler	Venue	Format	Tournament/series	Notes
16 March 2007	(South Africa) Herschelle Gibbs	(Netherlands) Daan van Bunge	Warner Park Sporting Complex, Basseterre, St. Kitts and Nevis	ODI	2007 ICC Cricket World Cup	
19 September 2007	(India) Yuvraj Singh	(England) Stuart Broad	Kingsmead Cricket Ground, Durban, South Africa	T20I	2007 ICC World Twenty20	
3 March 2021	(Cricket West Indies) Kieron Pollard	(Sri Lanka) Akila Dananjaya	Coolidge Cricket Ground, Osbourn, Antigua and Barbuda	T20I	Sri Lankan cricket team in the West Indies in 2020–21	
9 September 2021	(United States) Jaskaran Malhotra	(Papua New Guinea) Gaudi Toka	Oman Cricket Academy Ground Turf 1, Al Amarat, Oman	ODI	Papua New Guinean cricket team in Oman in 2021–22	
13 April 2024	(Nepal) Dipendra Singh Airee	(Qatar) Kamran Khan	Oman Cricket Academy Ground Turf 1, Al Amarat, Oman	T20I	2024 ACC Men's Premier Cup	
20 August 2024	(Samoa) Darius Visser	(Vanuatu) Nalin Nipiko	Faleata Oval 2, Apia, Samoa	T20I	2025 Men's T20 World Cup Asia–EAP Regional Final	
13 July 2025	(Bulgaria) Manan Bashir	(Gibraltar) Kabir Mirpuri	National Sports Academy, Sofia, Bulgaria	T20I	2025 Bulgaria Tri-Nation Series	
31 May 2026	(Nepal) Kushal Bhurtel	(China) Chen Zhuoyue	Singapore National Cricket Ground, West Coast, Singapore	T20I	Cricket at the 2026 Asian Games – Men's Qualifier	

== See also ==
- Home run - similar to a six.

== Notes ==
1. On 31 August 1968, Sobers became the first man to hit six sixes off a single six-ball over in first-class cricket. The over was bowled by Malcolm Nash in Nottinghamshire's first innings against Glamorgan at St Helen's in Swansea. Nash was a seam bowler but decided to try his arm at spin bowling. This achievement was caught on film.
2. On 10 January 1985, Bombay's Shastri equalled Sobers' record of hitting six sixes in an over in first-class cricket, off the bowling of Baroda's Tilak Raj, at the Wankhede.
3. On 23 July 2017, Worcestershire's Whiteley hit six sixes off six legal deliveries plus one wide to take the total number of runs in that over to 37 off bowler Karl Carver of Yorkshire at Headingley during a NatWest T20 Blast match.
4. On 14 October 2018, Zazai hit six sixes in an over off the bowling of Abdullah Mazari for Kabul Zwanan in a match against Balkh Legends in the 2018–19 Afghanistan Premier League, in Sharjah.
5. On 5 January 2020, in the 2019–20 Super Smash match between Canterbury and Northern Districts in Christchurch, Carter hit six sixes in one over off the bowling of Anton Devcich.
6. On 29 March 2021, in the 2020–21 Major Clubs Limited Over Tournament match between Sri Lanka Army Sports Club and Bloomfield Cricket and Athletic Club at the Army Ground in Panagoda, Army Sports Club's captain Perera hit six sixes in one over off the bowling of Dilhan Cooray. This was the second instance in a List A match, and the first in a domestic match.
7. On 28 November 2022, Gaikwad became the first batsman to hit seven sixes in an over, for Maharashtra against Uttar Pradesh in the second quarter-final of the Vijay Hazare Trophy in Ahmedabad. The bowler was Shiva Singh.
8. On 9 November 2025, Choudhary became only the third batsman to hit six sixes in an over in first-class cricket.
9. On 16 March 2007, in a match between South Africa and the Netherlands in Basseterre at the 2007 Cricket World Cup, Gibbs became the first person to hit six sixes off an over in a One Day International match. The over was bowled by Dutch leg-spinner Daan van Bunge.
10. On 19 September 2007, during a match between England and India in the inaugural T20 World Cup in Kingsmead, Singh became the first batsman to hit six sixes in an over in a T20 International, in an over bowled by Stuart Broad.
11. On 3 March 2021, West Indian captain Pollard hit six sixes in an over off the bowling of Akila Dananjaya in the first T20I between Sri Lanka and the West Indies at the Coolidge Cricket Ground. Dananjaya had taken a hat-trick in his previous over.
12. On 9 September 2021, Malhotra of the United States hit six sixes in one over, off the bowling of Papua New Guinea's Gaudi Toka in Muscat, becoming the second cricketer to achieve this in ODIs. He became the first USA batsman to make an ODI century.
13. On 13 April 2024, during a match between Nepal and Qatar in the 2024 ACC Men's Premier Cup in Muscat, Airee became the third batsman to hit six sixes in an over in a T20 International, in an over bowled by Kamran Khan.
14. On 20 August 2024, during a 2025 Men's T20 World Cup Asia–EAP Regional Final match against Vanuatu in Apia, Darius Visser of Samoa broke the record for the most runs in a T20I over, hitting 39 runs off the over, including six sixes. The bowler was Nalin Nipiko who bowled three no-balls in the 15th over of Samoa's innings. Visser made 132 runs off 62 balls (five fours and 14 sixes), becoming the first Samoan to score a T20I century.
15. On 13 July 2025, during the final match of the 2025 Bulgaria Tri-Nation Series against Gibraltar in Sofia, Manan Bashir of Bulgaria became the fifth batsman to hit six sixes in an over in a T20 International, in an over bowled by Kabir Mirpuri.
16. On 31 May 2026, during the opening match of the Cricket at the 2026 Asian Games – Men's Qualifier against China in Singapore, Kushal Bhurtel of Nepal became the sixth batsman to hit six sixes in an over in a Twenty20 International (T20I), achieving the feat against bowler Chen Zhuo Yue.
