= 2025 Men's T20 World Cup Asia–EAP Regional Final =

Qualifying tournament for the 2026 Men's T20 World Cup

2025 Men's T20 World Cup Asia-EAP Regional Final
- Dates: 8 – 17 October 2025
- Administrator(s): Asian Cricket Council; ICC East Asia-Pacific
- Cricket format: Twenty20 International
- Tournament format(s): Group round-robin and Super 6s
- Host: Oman
- Champions: Nepal (1st title)
- Runners-up: Oman
- Participants: 9
- Matches: 21
- Player of the series: (United Arab Emirates) Alishan Sharafu
- Most runs: (United Arab Emirates) Alishan Sharafu (283)
- Most wickets: (Qatar) Mirza Mohammed Baig (16)

The 2025 ICC Men's T20 World Cup Asia-EAP Regional Final was a cricket tournament that formed part of the qualification process for the 2026 Men's T20 World Cup. It was held in Oman from 8 to 17 October 2025.

The top three sides Nepal, Oman and United Arab Emirates joined Afghanistan, Australia, Bangladesh, India, New Zealand, Pakistan and Sri Lanka in the 2026 T20 World Cup who had already pre-qualified. India and Sri Lanka directly qualified for the T20 World Cup as co-hosts, while Afghanistan, Australia and Bangladesh qualified as by finishing among the top eight teams from the previous edition and New Zealand and Pakistan qualified through the ICC Men's T20I Team Rankings.

== Teams and qualification ==
In this cycle, a total of 14 teams participated in the Asian sub-regional phase and 8 teams were participating in the EAP sub-regional phase. The Asian sub-regional phase was divided into two events of seven teams and the EAP sub-regional phase was divided into two events of four teams.

The top two sides of each Asia sub-regional qualifier along with the winners of EAP sub-regional qualifiers advanced to a combined regional final, where they will join Nepal, Oman and Papua New Guinea who received a bye after participating in the 2024 ICC Men's T20 World Cup.

Method of qualification	Date	Venue(s)	No. of teams	Team
2024 T20 World Cup	29 June 2024	United States; West Indies	3	Nepal
2024 T20 World Cup	29 June 2024	United States; West Indies	3	Oman
2024 T20 World Cup	29 June 2024	United States; West Indies	3	Papua New Guinea
EAP Qualifier A	17–24 August 2024	Samoa	1	Samoa
Asia Qualifier A	30 August – 9 September 2024	Malaysia	2	Kuwait
Asia Qualifier A	30 August – 9 September 2024	Malaysia	2	Malaysia
EAP Qualifier B	28 September – 5 October 2024	South Korea	1	Japan
Asia Qualifier B	19–28 November 2024	Qatar	2	Qatar
Asia Qualifier B	19–28 November 2024	Qatar	2	United Arab Emirates
Total			9	

== Squads ==
Japan	Kuwait	Malaysia	Nepal	Oman
Kendel Kadowaki-Fleming (c); Abdul Samad; Abhishek Anand; Charles Hinze; Benjamin Ito-Davis; Wataru Miyauchi (wk); Esam Rahman; Sabaorish Ravichandran; Reo Sakurano-Thomas; Alexander Shirai-Patmore (wk); Shoma Sugaya-Slater; Declan Suzuki-McComb; Ibrahim Takahashi; Makoto Taniyama; Lachlan Yamamoto-Lake	Mohammed Aslam (c); Clinto Anto; Meet Bhavsar (wk); Anudeep Chenthamara; Muhammad Aqif Farooq; Shiraz Khan; Nimish Lathief; Usman Patel (wk); Yasin Patel; Naveenraj Rajendran; Ravija Sandaruwan; Mohamed Shafeeq; Bilal Tahir; Muhammad Umar; Ali Zaheer	Syed Aziz (c); Ainool Hafizs; Muhammad Amir; Arif Ullah; Ahmad Faiz; Khizar Hayat; Muhammad Haziq Aiman; Aslam Khan; Sharvin Muniandy; Pavandeep Singh; Virandeep Singh; Muhamad Syahadat; Vijay Unni; Muhammad Wafiq; Aqeel Wahid	Rohit Paudel (c); Dipendra Singh Airee (vc); Mohammad Aadil Alam; Lokesh Bam; Kushal Bhurtel; Gulshan Jha; Sundeep Jora; Sandeep Lamichhane; Sompal Kami; Karan KC; Kushal Malla; Lalit Rajbanshi; Aarif Sheikh; Aasif Sheikh (wk); Nandan Yadav	Jatinder Singh (Note: Aamir Kaleem captained Oman in the first and last match of the qualifier.) (c); Vinayak Shukla (vc); Shakeel Ahmed; Aryan Bisht; Shah Faisal; Hasnain Ul Wahab; Zikria Islam; Aamir Kaleem; Nadeem Khan; Sufyan Mehmood; Hammad Mirza; Mohammed Nadeem; Jiten Ramanandi; Hassnain Shah; Samay Shrivastava
Papua New Guinea	Qatar	Samoa	United Arab Emirates	
Assad Vala (c); Malcolm Aporo; Sese Bau; John Kariko; Ainui Loi; Michael Charlie; Kabua Morea; Alei Nao; Patrick Nou; Damien Ravu; Boio Ray; Doko Rupa; Lega Siaka; Gaudi Toka; Hila Vare (wk)	Mirza Mohammed Baig (c); Owais Ahmed; Zubair Ali; Saqlain Arshad; Muhammad Asim; Amir Farooq; Shahzaib Jamil (wk); Ikramullah Khan; Daniel Louis; Imal Liyanage (wk); Shariq Munir; Muhammad Murad; Mujeeb-ur-Rehman; Arif Nasir Uddin; Muhammad Tanveer	Caleb Jasmat (c); Daniel Burgess; Douglas Finau; Samuel French (wk); Kurtis Hynam-Nyberg; Benjamin Mailata; Noah Mead; Solomon Nash; Samson Sola; Sean Solia; Fereti Suluoto (wk); Ross Taylor; Saumani Tiai; Ili Tugaga; Darius Visser	Muhammad Waseem (c); Haider Ali; Zahid Ali; Muhammad Arfan; Basil Hameed; Rahul Chopra (wk); Muhammad Farooq; Jonathan Figy; Harshit Kaushik; Mayank Kumar; Dhruv Parashar; Muhammad Rohid; Alishan Sharafu; Aryansh Sharma (wk); Junaid Siddique; Simranjeet Singh	

== Preparations ==
=== Samoa in Malaysia ===
Samoa toured Malaysia to play two 20-over matches against Malaysia A in September.

26 September 2025
10:00
Scorecard

Samoa; 164/5 (20 overs)	v	Malaysia A 108 (16.1 overs)
Benjamin Mailata 62 (45); Amir Khan 2/20 (4 overs)		Aiman Zaquan Ridzuan 33 (29); Solomon Nash 3/12 (3 overs)

Samoa won by 56 runs
Bayuemas Oval, Kuala Lumpur

- Samoa won the toss and elected to bat.

28 September 2025
10:00
Scorecard

Malaysia A	v	Samoa

Match abandoned
Bayuemas Oval, Kuala Lumpur

- No toss.

=== Kuwait in Oman ===
Kuwait men's cricket team in Oman in 2025
	Oman	Kuwait
- Dates: 29 – 30 September 2025
Captains	Jatinder Singh (Note: Mohammad Nadeem captained Oman in the second T20I.)	Mohammed Aslam

Twenty20 International series
- Results: Oman won the 2-match series 2–0
Most runs	Vinayak Shukla (75)	Clinto Anto (44)
Most wickets	Sufyan Mehmood (5)	Muhammad Aqif Farooq (3)

==== 1st T20I ====
29 September 2025
19:00 (D/N)
Scorecard

Kuwait; 142/8 (20 overs)	v	Oman; 143/5 (19.2 overs)
Yasin Patel 27* (18); Sufyan Mehmood 3/28 (4 overs)		Mohammad Nadeem 36* (38); Anudeep Chenthamara 2/19 (3.2 overs)

Oman won by 5 wickets
Oman Cricket Academy Ground Turf 1, Al Amarat
Umpires: Rahul Asher (Oma) and Harikrishna Pillai (Oma)
Player of the match: Mohammad Nadeem (Oma)

- Oman won the toss and elected to field.
- Nadeem Khan (Oma) made his T20I debut.

==== 2nd T20I ====
30 September 2025
14:30
Scorecard

Kuwait; 107/8 (20 overs)	v	Oman; 111/5 (18.1 overs)
Clinto Anto 19 (21); Mohammad Nadeem 2/11 (3 overs)		Vinayak Shukla 51* (46); Muhammad Aqif Farooq 3/24 (4 overs)

Oman won by 5 wickets
Oman Cricket Academy Ground Turf 1, Al Amarat
Umpires: Vinod Babu (Oma) and Harikrishna Pillai (Oma)
Player of the match: Vinayak Shukla (Oma)

- Oman won the toss and elected to field.
- Hasnain Ul Wahab (Oma) and Muhammad Aqif Farooq (Kuw) both made their T20I debuts.

== Warm-up matches ==
Warm-up matches

3 October 2025
10:00
Scorecard

Oman; 129/8 (20 overs)	v	Kuwait; 130/7 (18.5 overs)
Aryan Bisht 35 (33); Anudeep Chenthamara 3/31 (4 overs)		Bilal Tahir 21 (21); Jiten Ramanandi 3/12 (2 overs)

Kuwait won by 3 wickets
Oman Cricket Academy Ground Turf 2, Al Amarat
Umpires: Vinod Babu (Oma) and Harikrishna Pillai (Oma)

- Kuwait won the toss and elected to field.

3 October 2025
14:30
Scorecard

United Arab Emirates; 169/6 (20 overs)	v	Papua New Guinea; 61 (12 overs)
Aryansh Sharma 65 (40); Kabua Morea 2/22 (4 overs)		Kabua Morea 22* (16); Dhruv Parashar 3/14 (2 overs)

United Arab Emirates won by 108 runs
Oman Cricket Academy Ground Turf 1, Al Amarat
Umpires: Lonappan Freddie (Oma) and Gopakumar Pillai (Oma)

- Papua New Guinea won the toss and elected to field.

3 October 2025
19:00 (N)
Scorecard

Samoa; 159/5 (20 overs)	v	Japan; 160/5 (18.3 overs)
Benjamin Mailata 37 (27); Charles Hinze 2/5 (2 overs)		Esam Rahman 50* (31); Saumani Tiai 2/37 (4 overs)

Japan won by 5 wickets
Oman Cricket Academy Ground Turf 1, Al Amarat
Umpires: Azad KR (Oma) and Sagir Vengitta Puthanpurakkal (Oma)

- Japan won the toss and elected to field.

4 October 2025
14:30
Scorecard

Malaysia; 154/8 (20 overs)	v	Samoa; 140 (19.5 overs)
Ahmad Faiz 40 (30); Solomon Nash 2/32 (3 overs)		Fereti Suluoto 42* (25); Arif Ullah 4/16 (3.5 overs)

Malaysia won by 14 runs
Oman Cricket Academy Ground Turf 2, Al Amarat
Umpires: Parameswaran Balasubramanian (Oma) and Zaman Quoraishi (Oma)

- Samoa won the toss and elected to field.

4 October 2025
19:00 (N)
Scorecard

Oman; 110/9 (20 overs)	v	Nepal; 114/4 (17 overs)
Aryan Bisht 23 (25); Dipendra Singh Airee 3/10 (3 overs)		Aasif Sheikh 61 (47); Aamir Kaleem 2/16 (3 overs)

Nepal won by 6 wickets
Oman Cricket Academy Ground Turf 1, Al Amarat
Umpires: Vinod Babu (Oma) and Gopakumar Pillai (Oma)

- Nepal won the toss and elected to field.

5 October 2025
14:30
Scorecard

United Arab Emirates; 168/7 (20 overs)	v	Japan; 142 (19.5 overs)
Muhammad Waseem 50 (28); Makoto Taniyama 2/12 (3 overs)		Abhishek Anand 76 (50); Muhammad Farooq 2/26 (3 overs)

United Arab Emirates won by 26 runs
Oman Cricket Academy Ground Turf 2, Al Amarat
Umpires: Lonappan Freddie (Oma) and Mujahid Surve (Oma)

- Japan won the toss and elected to field.

5 October 2025
19:00 (N)
Scorecard

Kuwait; 184 (19.5 overs)	v	Qatar; 150/6 (20 overs)
Meet Bhavsar 65 (48); Mirza Mohammed Baig 3/26 (4 overs)		Zubair Ali 48 (43); Anudeep Chenthamara 2/22 (4 overs)

Kuwait won by 34 runs
Oman Cricket Academy Ground Turf 1, Al Amarat
Umpires: Azad KR (Oma) and Sagir Vengitta Puthanpurakkal (Oma)

- Qatar won the toss and elected to field.

6 October 2025
14:30
Scorecard

Nepal; 170/7 (20 overs)	v	Qatar; 154/6 (20 overs)
Kushal Bhurtel 56 (33); Shariq Azam 2/26 (4 overs)		Muhammad Tanveer 51 (37); Karan KC 3/36 (4 overs)

Nepal won by 16 runs
Oman Cricket Academy Ground Turf 2, Al Amarat
Umpires: Parameswaran Balasubramanian (Oma) and Zaman Quoraishi (Oma)

- Nepal won the toss and elected to bat.

6 October 2025
19:00 (N)
Scorecard

Papua New Guinea; 159/6 (20 overs)	v	Malaysia; 163/8 (20 overs)
Sese Bau 59 (44); Khizar Hayat 3/11 (4 overs)		Ahmad Faiz 37 (30); Assad Vala 3/21 (3 overs)

Malaysia won by 2 wickets
Oman Cricket Academy Ground Turf 1, Al Amarat
Umpires: Gopakumar Pillai (Oma) and Harikrishna Pillai (Oma)

- Papua New Guinea won the toss and elected to bat.

== Group stage ==
The group division and the fixtures of the Asia–EAP Regional Final were announced by the International Cricket Council on 10 July 2025.

=== Group A ===
==== Points table ====
Group A standings
Pos	Team	Pld	W	L	NR	Pts	NRR	Qualification
1	United Arab Emirates	2	2	0	0	4	0.584	Advanced to the Super 6
2	Qatar	2	1	1	0	2	0.225	Advanced to the Super 6
3	Malaysia	2	0	2	0	0	−0.873	Eliminated

Source: ESPNcricinfo

==== Fixtures ====
8 October 2025
14:30
Scorecard

Qatar; 118/8 (20 overs)	v	United Arab Emirates; 119/3 (18.3 overs)
Mirza Mohammed Baig 30 (29); Muhammad Rohid 2/13 (4 overs)		Alishan Sharafu 51* (42); Mujeeb-ur-Rehman 2/21 (4 overs)

United Arab Emirates won by 7 wickets
Oman Cricket Academy Ground Turf 1, Al Amarat
Umpires: Rahul Asher (Oma) and Prageeth Rambukwella (SL)
Player of the match: Muhammad Rohid (UAE)

- Qatar won the toss and elected to bat.
- Zubair Ali, Shariq Munir (Qat) and Zahid Ali (UAE) all made their T20I debuts.

9 October 2025
10:00
Scorecard

Malaysia; 123/9 (20 overs)	v	Qatar; 124/2 (17.1 overs)
Virandeep Singh 62* (54); Mirza Mohammed Baig 4/17 (4 overs)		Zubair Ali 65* (44); Virandeep Singh 1/22 (3 overs)

Qatar won by 8 wickets
Oman Cricket Academy Ground Turf 2, Al Amarat
Umpires: Rahul Asher (Oma) and Shawn Craig (Aus)
Player of the match: Zubair Ali (Qat)

- Qatar won the toss and elected to field.
- Owais Ahmed (Qat) became the first player for Qatar to take a hat-trick in men's T20Is.

10 October 2025
10:00
Scorecard

Malaysia; 161/5 (20 overs)	v	United Arab Emirates; 167/4 (19.2 overs)
Ahmad Faiz 54* (39); Dhruv Parashar 1/8 (2 overs)		Muhammad Waseem 84 (53); Syed Aziz 2/20 (3 overs)

United Arab Emirates won by 6 wickets
Oman Cricket Academy Ground Turf 2, Al Amarat
Umpires: Rahul Asher (Oma) and Phillip Gillespie (Aus)
Player of the match: Muhammad Waseem (UAE)

- United Arab Emirates won the toss and elected to field.
- Muhammad Arfan (UAE) made his T20I debut.

=== Group B ===
==== Points table ====
Group B standings
Pos	Team	Pld	W	L	NR	Pts	NRR	Qualification
1	Nepal	2	2	0	0	4	1.834	Advanced to the Super 6
2	Japan	2	1	1	0	2	−0.309	Advanced to the Super 6
3	Kuwait	2	0	2	0	0	−1.576	Eliminated

Source: ESPNcricinfo

==== Fixtures ====
8 October 2025
19:00 (N)
Scorecard

Nepal; 141/7 (20 overs)	v	Kuwait; 83 (18.1 overs)
Kushal Bhurtel 66 (56); Anudeep Chenthamara 2/22 (4 overs)		Clinto Anto 26 (23); Rohit Paudel 2/9 (2 overs)

Nepal won by 58 runs
Oman Cricket Academy Ground Turf 1, Al Amarat
Umpires: Phillip Gillespie (Aus) and Rashid Riaz (Pak)
Player of the match: Kushal Bhurtel (Nep)

- Kuwait won the toss and elected to field.

9 October 2025
14:30
Scorecard

Kuwait; 177/6 (20 overs)	v	Japan; 178/5 (19.3 overs)
Ali Zaheer 41 (31); Declan Suzuki-McComb 3/22 (2 overs)		Esam Rahman 64 (39); Shiraz Khan 1/23 (2 overs)

Japan won by 5 wickets
Oman Cricket Academy Ground Turf 1, Al Amarat
Umpires: Phillip Gillespie (Aus) and Shiju Sam (UAE)
Player of the match: Esam Rahman (Jpn)

- Japan won the toss and elected to field.
- Esam Rahman (Jpn) made his T20I debut.

10 October 2025
14:30
Scorecard

Japan; 131/8 (20 overs)	v	Nepal; 132/5 (18 overs)
Kendel Kadowaki-Fleming 60 (46); Gulshan Jha 2/20 (4 overs)		Aasif Sheikh 38 (21); Shoma Sugaya-Slater 2/22 (4 overs)

Nepal won by 5 wickets
Oman Cricket Academy Ground Turf 1, Al Amarat
Umpires: Masudur Rahman (Ban) and Shiju Sam (UAE)
Player of the match: Gulshan Jha (Nep)

- Nepal won the toss and elected to field.

=== Group C ===
==== Points table ====
Group C standings
Pos	Team	Pld	W	L	NR	Pts	NRR	Qualification
1	Oman (H)	2	2	0	0	4	1.874	Advanced to the Super 6
2	Samoa	2	1	1	0	2	−0.302	Advanced to the Super 6
3	Papua New Guinea	2	0	2	0	0	−1.574	Eliminated

Source: ESPNcricinfo
(H) Host

==== Fixtures ====
8 October 2025
10:00
Scorecard

Samoa; 92/9 (20 overs)	v	Oman; 96/5 (17 overs)
Fereti Sululoto 22 (16); Shah Faisal 2/12 (4 overs)		Mohammed Nadeem 21* (22); Saumani Tiai 2/13 (4 overs)

Oman won by 5 wickets
Oman Cricket Academy Ground Turf 2, Al Amarat
Umpires: Shawn Craig (Aus) and Masudur Rahman (Ban)
Player of the match: Shah Faisal (Oma)

- Oman won the toss and elected to field.
- Sean Solia and Ili Tugaga (Sam) both made their T20I debuts.
- Ross Taylor played his first T20I for Samoa after having previously played 102 T20Is for New Zealand, becoming the 22nd cricketer to represent two international teams in men's T20Is.

9 October 2025
19:00 (N)
Scorecard

Papua New Guinea; 117 (20 overs)	v	Samoa; 118/4 (18.3 overs)
Assad Vala 38 (38); Solomon Nash 4/24 (4 overs)		Sean Solia 62 (45); John Kariko 1/7 (3 overs)

Samoa won by 6 wickets
Oman Cricket Academy Ground Turf 1, Al Amarat
Umpires: Masudur Rahman (Ban) and Prageeth Rambukwella (SL)
Player of the match: Sean Solia (Sam)

- Papua New Guinea won the toss and elected to bat.

10 October 2025
19:00 (N)
Scorecard

Oman; 138/7 (20 overs)	v	Papua New Guinea; 86 (16.4 overs)
Vinayak Shukla 48 (24); Kabua Morea 2/33 (4 overs)		Sese Bau 35 (34); Shakeel Ahmed 3/15 (4 overs)

Oman won by 52 runs
Oman Cricket Academy Ground Turf 1, Al Amarat
Umpires: Shawn Craig (Aus) and Rashid Riaz (Pak)
Player of the match: Vinayak Shukla (Oma)

- Papua New Guinea won the toss and elected to field.

== Super 6 ==
=== Points table ===
Super 6 stage standings
Pos	Team	Pld	W	L	NR	Pts	NRR	Qualification
1	Nepal	5	5	0	0	10	1.849	Qualified for the 2026 Men's T20 World Cup
2	Oman	5	4	1	0	8	0.456	Qualified for the 2026 Men's T20 World Cup
3	United Arab Emirates	5	3	2	0	6	1.493	Qualified for the 2026 Men's T20 World Cup
4	Qatar	5	2	3	0	4	−0.114	Eliminated
5	Japan	5	1	4	0	2	−1.033	Eliminated
6	Samoa	5	0	5	0	0	−2.809	Eliminated

Source: ESPNcricinfo

=== Fixtures ===
12 October 2025
10:00
Scorecard

Oman; 172/6 (20 overs)	v	Qatar; 138/9 (20 overs)
Jatinder Singh 66 (40); Mirza Mohammed Baig 4/28 (4 overs)		Shariq Munir 34 (25); Jitenkumar Ramanandi 3/22 (3 overs)

Oman won by 34 runs
Oman Cricket Academy Ground Turf 2, Al Amarat
Umpires: Phillip Gillespie (Aus) and Prageeth Rambukwella (SL)
Player of the match: Jatinder Singh (Oma)

- Qatar won the toss and elected to field.

12 October 2025
14:30
Scorecard

Nepal; 140/6 (20 overs)	v	United Arab Emirates; 139/9 (20 overs)
Aasif Sheikh 51 (47); Dhruv Parashar 1/10 (2 overs)		Alishan Sharafu 58 (40); Dipendra Singh Airee 3/22 (4 overs)

Nepal won by 1 run
Oman Cricket Academy Ground Turf 1, Al Amarat
Umpires: Masudur Rahman (Ban) and Rashid Riaz (Pak)
Player of the match: Dipendra Singh Airee (Nep)

- Nepal won the toss and elected to bat.
- Jonathan Figy (UAE) made his T20I debut.

12 October 2025
19:00 (N)
Scorecard

Japan; 162/6 (20 overs)	v	Samoa; 158/7 (20 overs)
Abhishek Anand 55 (42); Darius Visser 3/39 (4 overs)		Sean Solia 41 (23); Declan Suzuki-McComb 3/29 (3.3 overs)

Japan won by 4 runs
Oman Cricket Academy Ground Turf 1, Al Amarat
Umpires: Shawn Craig (Aus) and Shiju Sam (UAE)
Player of the match: Ibrahim Takahashi (Jpn)

- Samoa won the toss and elected to field.

13 October 2025
14:30
Scorecard

United Arab Emirates; 112/7 (20 overs)	v	Oman; 113/5 (19.4 overs)
Muhammad Waseem 22 (35); Shakeel Ahmed 1/13 (3 overs)		Jatinder Singh 33 (23); Dhruv Parashar 1/4 (2 overs)

Oman won by 5 wickets
Oman Cricket Academy Ground Turf 1, Al Amarat
Umpires: Shawn Craig (Aus) and Rashid Riaz (Pak)
Player of the match: Nadeem Khan (Oma)

- United Arab Emirates won the toss and elected to bat.

13 October 2025
19:00 (N)
Scorecard

Nepal; 147/9 (20 overs)	v	Qatar; 142 (19.5 overs)
Rohit Paudel 58 (42); Daniel Louis 3/22 (3 overs)		Imal Liyanage 56 (35); Sandeep Lamichhane 5/18 (3.5 overs)

Nepal won by 5 runs
Oman Cricket Academy Ground Turf 1, Al Amarat
Umpires: Rahul Asher (Oma) and Shiju Sam (UAE)
Player of the match: Sandeep Lamichhane (Nep)

- Qatar won the toss and elected to field.

15 October 2025
10:00
Scorecard

Japan; 139/4 (20 overs)	v	Qatar; 140/7 (19.4 overs)
Esam Rahman 60* (47); Mirza Mohammed Baig 2/24 (4 overs)		Shariq Munir 41 (29); Benjamin Ito-Davis 3/28 (4 overs)

Qatar won by 3 wickets
Oman Cricket Academy Ground Turf 2, Al Amarat
Umpires: Prageeth Rambukwella (SL) and Shiju Sam (UAE)
Player of the match: Shariq Munir (Qat)

- Qatar won the toss and elected to field.

15 October 2025
14:30
Scorecard

United Arab Emirates; 225/4 (20 overs)	v	Samoa; 148/8 (20 overs)
Alishan Sharafu 86 (51); Solomon Nash 2/42 (4 overs)		Caleb Jasmat 41* (24); Muhammad Farooq 4/35 (4 overs)

United Arab Emirates won by 77 runs
Oman Cricket Academy Ground Turf 1, Al Amarat
Umpires: Rahul Asher (Oma) and Phillip Gillespie (Aus)
Player of the match: Muhammad Farooq (UAE)

- Samoa won the toss and elected to field.
- Mayank Kumar (UAE) made his T20I debut.
- Muhammad Farooq (UAE) took his first hat-trick in T20Is.
- As a result of this match, both Nepal and Oman qualified for the 2026 Men's T20 World Cup.

15 October 2025
19:00 (N)
Scorecard

Nepal; 151/9 (20 overs)	v	Oman; 113/9 (20 overs)
Kushal Bhurtel 69 (51); Nadeem Khan 4/20 (4 overs)		Vinayak Shukla 32 (19); Gulshan Jha 3/31 (4 overs)

Nepal won by 38 runs
Oman Cricket Academy Ground Turf 1, Al Amarat
Umpires: Masudur Rahman (Ban) and Rashid Riaz (Pak)
Player of the match: Kushal Bhurtel (Nep)

- Nepal won the toss and elected to bat.
- Kushal Malla (Nep) scored his 1,000th run in T20Is.

16 October 2025
14:30
Scorecard

Japan; 116/9 (20 overs)	v	United Arab Emirates; 118/2 (12.1 overs)
Wataru Miyauchi 45* (32); Haider Ali 3/20 (4 overs)		Alishan Sharafu 46 (27); Declan Suzuki-McComb 1/14 (1.1 overs)

United Arab Emirates won by 8 wickets
Oman Cricket Academy Ground Turf 1, Al Amarat
Umpires: Shawn Craig (Aus) and Masudur Rahman (Ban)
Player of the match: Haider Ali (UAE)

- United Arab Emirates won the toss and elected to field.
- As a result of this match, United Arab Emirates qualified for the 2026 Men's T20 World Cup.

16 October 2025
19:00 (N)
Scorecard

Samoa; 126/9 (20 overs)	v	Qatar; 128/2 (15.1 overs)
Benjamin Mailata 35 (38); Daniel Louis 2/21 (3 overs)		Zubair Ali 55* (46); Kurtis Hynam-Nyberg 1/15 (2 overs)

Qatar won by 8 wickets
Oman Cricket Academy Ground Turf 1, Al Amarat
Umpires: Phillip Gillespie (Aus) and Prageeth Rambukwella (SL)
Player of the match: Muhammad Asim (Qat)

- Qatar won the toss and elected to field.

17 October 2025
10:00
Scorecard

Japan; 103 (18.2 overs)	v	Oman; 107/1 (17 overs)
Ibrahim Takahashi 29 (20); Sufyan Mehmood 3/26 (4 overs)		Hammad Mirza 50* (55); Charles Hinze 1/18 (2 overs)

Oman won by 9 wickets
Oman Cricket Academy Ground Turf 1, Al Amarat
Umpires: Prageeth Rambukwella (SL) and Rashid Riaz (Pak)
Player of the match: Sufyan Mehmood (Oma)

- Oman won the toss and elected to field.

17 October 2025
14:30
Scorecard

Nepal; 211/4 (20 overs)	v	Samoa; 87/7 (20 overs)
Aasif Sheikh 69 (41); Daniel Burgess 1/28 (4 overs)		Sean Solia 40 (37); Lalit Rajbanshi 3/13 (4 overs)

Nepal won by 124 runs
Oman Cricket Academy Ground Turf 1, Al Amarat
Umpires: Rahul Asher (Oma) and Shiju Sam (UAE)
Player of the match: Aasif Sheikh (Nep)

- Samoa won the toss and elected to field.
