= 2011 EAP Twenty20 Division Two =

2011 ICC EAP Trophy Division 2
- Administrator: EAP
- Cricket format: Twenty20
- Tournament format: Group Stage with Finals
- Host: Samoa
- Champions: Samoa (1st title)
- Participants: 6
- Matches: 18
- Most runs: (Samoa) Benjamin Mailata (189)
- Most wickets: (Philippines) R Thakur (10) (Samoa) Tiafala Alatasi (10)

The 2011 ICC EAP Trophy Division 2 was a Twenty20 cricket competition played from 2 to 8 April 2011 in Apia, Samoa. After a round robin group stage of five matches, Samoa easily beat the Philippines in the final, winning the tournament and promotion to Division One.

== Group stage ==
=== Points table ===
Team	Pts	Pld	W	L	NRR
Samoa	10	5	5	0	3.070
Philippines	8	5	4	1	1.785
Tonga	4	5	2	3	0.078
Cook Islands	4	5	2	3	–1.100
Indonesia	2	5	1	4	–1.254
South Korea	2	5	1	4	–2.153

=== Matches ===
4 April
8.30 p.m.
Scorecard

South Korea; 54 (18.1 overs)	v	Samoa; 59/1 (6.4 overs)
Altaf Gill 17 (33); Loutala Fuinaomo 3/2 (3 overs)		Sean Cotter 29* (22); I Ghafoor 1/14 (2 overs)

Samoa won by 9 wickets
Ground 1, Apia
Umpires: Grant Johnston (Van) and Leavau Simaika (Sam)
Player of the match: Loutala Fuimaono (Sam)

- Samoa won the toss and elected to field.

4 April
8.30 p.m.
Scorecard

Indonesia; 105/6 (20 overs)	v	Philippines; 106/3 (14.2 overs)
Y Rosongna 20 (17); V Kumar 2/11 (4 overs)		T Ali 39 (34); S Modak 2/20 (4 overs)

Philippines won by 7 wickets
Ground 2, Apia
Umpires: Koria Patia (Cok) and Walesi Soqoiwasa (Fij)
Player of the match: T Ali (Phi)

- Philippines won the toss and elected to field.

4 April
8.30 p.m.
Scorecard

Tonga; 165/7 (20 overs)	v	Cook Islands; 126/8 (20 overs)
N Moala 62 (39); D Tutai 2/13 (2 overs)		P Atuela 28 (38); M Tauelangi 2/10 (3 overs)

Tonga won by 39 runs
Ground 3, Apia
Umpires: Greg Walton (Van) and Peter Poulos (Sam)
Player of the match: N Moala (Ton)

- Cook Islands won the toss and elected to field.

5 April
12.45 a.m.
Scorecard

Cook Islands; 126/6 (20 overs)	v	Philippines; 127/5 (16.4 overs)
D Teinaki 47 (27); H Ahuja 2/7 (7 overs)		V Kumar 37* (32); W Punga 3/29 (4 overs)

Philippines won by 5 wickets
Ground 1, Apia
Umpires: Greg Walton (Van) and Leavau Simaika (Sam)
Player of the match: V Kumar (Phi)

- Cook Islands won the toss and elected to bat.

5 April
12.45 a.m.
Scorecard

South Korea; 90 (14.2 overs)	v	Indonesia; 98/5 (17.1 overs)
T Muhammad 37 (22); Rizky Tri Rubbi 4/20 (4 overs)		Rizky Tri Rubbi 23 (18); L Hwayeon 2/24 (3.1 overs)

Indonesia won by 5 wickets
Ground 2, Apia
Umpires: Peter Poulos (Sam) and Walesi Soqoiwasa (Fij)
Player of the match: Rizky Tri Rubbi (Ina)

- South Korea won the toss and elected to bat.

5 April
12.45 p.m.
Scorecard

Tonga; 39 (11.4 overs)	v	Samoa; 41/1 (8 overs)
S Latu 10 (10); Tiafala Alatasi 3/10 (4 overs)		Benjamin Mailata 27* (27); S Latu 1/17 (4 overs)

Samoa won by 9 wickets
Ground 3, Apia
Umpires: Grant Johnston (Van) and Koria Patia (Cok)

- Samoa won the toss and elected to field.

5 April
8.30 p.m.
Scorecard

Cook Islands; 81 (20 overs)	v	Samoa; 83/1 (10.3 overs)
T Pokuina 28 (29); Lesuni Luteru 4/13 (3.4 overs)		Benjamin Mailata 42* (28); T Etita 1/16 (3 overs)

Samoa won by 9 wickets
Tuanaimato Garden Ovals, Apia
Player of the match: Faafetai Benjamin Wailata (Sam)

- Samoa won the toss and elected to field.

5 April
8.30 p.m.
Scorecard

Tonga; 161/7 (20 overs)	v	Indonesia; 86 (17.5 overs)
S Holi 77 (44); S Modak 2/23 (4 overs)		D Silva 21 (14); L Tavelangi 3/23 (4 overs)

Tonga won by 76 runs
Ground 1, Apia
Player of the match: S Holi (Ton)

- Tonga won the toss and elected to bat.

5 April
8.30 p.m.
[ Scorecard]

Samoa	v	Cook Islands

Ground 2, Apia

5 April
8.30 p.m.
Scorecard

South Korea; 60 (18 overs)	v	Philippines; 62/4 (6.5 overs)
T Muhammad 24 (18); R Thakur 3/4 (4 overs)		H Ahuja 22 (10); R Roni 2/12 (2 overs)

Philippines won by 5 wickets
Ground 3, Apia
Umpires: Peter Poulos (Sam) and Koria Patia (Cok)
Player of the match: R Thakur (Phi)

- Philippines won the toss and elected to field.

6 April
12.45 a.m.
Scorecard

Philippines; 104/9 (20 overs)	v	Samoa; 105/2 (18.5 overs)
F Khan 30 (23); Winston Mariner 4/15 (4 overs)		Benjamin Mailata 49* (46); G Ali 1/17 (3 overs)

Samoa won by 8 wickets
Ground 1, Apia
Umpires: Grant Johnston (Van) and Greg Walton (Van)
Player of the match: Faafetai Benjamin Wailata (Sam)

- Samoa won the toss and elected to field.

6 April
12.45 a.m.
Scorecard

Tonga; 103 (19.4 overs)	v	South Korea; 104/6 (18.4 overs)
P Takau 21 (17); N Khan 4/9 (4 overs)		Altaf Gill 37* (29); L Tenisi 2/23 (4 overs)

South Korea won by 4 wickets
Ground 1, Apia
Player of the match: Altaf Gill (SK)

- South Korea won the toss and elected to field.

6 April
12.45 a.m.
Scorecard

Indonesia; 110/9 (20 overs)	v	Cook Islands; 112/8 (18.4 overs)
G Tiwari 23 (20); D Tutai 3/14 (4 overs)		D Teinaki 29 (31); IW Suandi 2/6 (2 overs)

Cook Islands won by 2 wickets
Ground 3, Apia
Player of the match: D Teinaki (Cok)

- Cook Islands won the toss and elected to field.

7 April
8.30 p.m.
Scorecard

Cook Islands; 146/7 (20 overs)	v	South Korea; 133/9 (20 overs)
M Emile 44* (51); R Roni 3/26 (3 overs)		T Muhammad 49 (30); D Teinaki 3/23 (4 overs)

Cook Islands won by 13 runs
Ground 1, Apia
Player of the match: M Emile (Cok)

- South Korea won the toss and elected to field.

7 April
8.30 p.m.
Scorecard

Philippines; 151/7 (20 overs)	v	Tonga; 126/7 (20 overs)
R Cheema 32 (22); P Voni 3/15 (4 overs)		N Moala 33 (24); R Thakur 4/17 (4 overs)

Philippines won by 23 runs
Ground 2, Apia

- Tonga won the toss and elected to field.

7 April
8.30 p.m.
Scorecard

Samoa; 159/5 (20 overs)	v	Indonesia; 67 (16.3 overs)
Pritchard Pritchard 67 (40); Rizky Tri Rubbi 4/32 (4 overs)		S Modak 24 (18); Murphy Sua 2/5 (1.3 overs)

Samoa won by 92 runs
Ground 3, Apia
Player of the match: Pritchard Pritchard (Sam)

- Tonga won the toss and elected to field.

8 April
12.45 p.m.
Scorecard

Cook Islands; 140/7 (20 overs)	v	Tonga; 126/8 (20 overs)
T Teinaki 33 (33); T Taukeiaito 1/13 (3 overs)		S Taulango 37 (28); W Punga 4/39 (4 overs)

Cook Islands won by 14 runs
Ground 1, Apia
Umpires: Greg Walton (Van) and Peter Poulos (Sam)
Player of the match: T Teinaki (Cok)

- Tonga won the toss and elected to field.

8 April
12.45 p.m.
Scorecard

Indonesia; 94 (19.4 overs)	v	South Korea; 96/1 (12.3 overs)
Y Rosongna 12 (13); R Roni 3/16 (4 overs)		T Muhammad 44* (38); G Arsa 1/15 (4 overs)

South Korea won by 9 wickets
Ground 3, Apia
Umpires: Greg Walton (Van) and Leavay Simaika (Sam)
Player of the match: R Roni (SK)

- Tonga won the toss and elected to field.

8 April
8.30 p.m.
Scorecard

Philippines; 180 (46 overs)	v	Samoa; 183/1 (40.3 overs)
F Khan 46 (55); Winston Mariner 5/34 (10 overs)		Benjamin Mailata 107* (128); R Thakur 1/35 (9 overs)

Samoa won by 9 wickets
Ground 2, Apia
Umpires: Grant Johnston (Van) and Walesi Soqoiwasa (Fij)
Player of the match: Faafetai benjamin Wailata (Sam)

- Tonga won the toss and elected to field.

== Statistics ==
=== Most runs ===
The top five highest run scorers (total runs) are included in this table.

Player	Team	Runs	Avg	HS
Benjamin Mailata	Samoa	189	-	49*
T Muhammad	South Korea	159	31.80	49
S Holi	Tonga	125	41.67	77
N Moala	Tonga	110	22.00	62
V Kumar	Philippines	94	31.33	37*

=== Most wickets ===
The following table contains the five leading wicket-takers.

Player	Team	Wkts	Ave	BBI
R Thakur	Philippines	10	7.50	4/17
Tiafala Alatasi	Samoa	10	6.60	3/10
Rizky Tri Rubbi	Indonesia	9	12.00	4/32
Faasao Mulivai	Samoa	8	7.13	2/9
Lesuni Luteru	Samoa	8	4.00	4/13

== Final standings ==
Pos	Team	Promotion
1st	Samoa	Will take part in the 2011 ICC EAP Trophy Division 1
2nd	Philippines	Will remain in Division Two
3rd	Cook Islands	Will remain in Division Two
4th	Tonga	Will remain in Division Two
5th	South Korea	Will remain in Division Two
6th	Indonesia	Will remain in Division Two

== See also ==
- 2012 ICC World Twenty20 Qualifier
- World Cricket League EAP region
