= 2024 Men's T20 World Cup East Asia-Pacific Sub-regional Qualifier B =

Qualification tournament for the 2026 T20WC in EAP region

2024 ICC Men's T20 World Cup East Asia-Pacific Sub-regional Qualifier B
- Dates: 28 September – 5 October 2024
- Administrator: ICC East Asia-Pacific
- Cricket format: Twenty20 International
- Tournament format: Double round-robin
- Host: South Korea
- Champions: Japan
- Runners-up: Philippines
- Participants: 4
- Matches: 12
- Most runs: (Japan) Kendel Kadowaki-Fleming (275)
- Most wickets: (Japan) Sabaorish Ravichandran (9) (Philippines) Huzaifa Mohammed (9) (Philippines) Daniel Smith (9) (Indonesia) Ferdinando Banunaek (9)

The 2024 ICC Men's T20 World Cup East Asia-Pacific Sub-regional Qualifier B was a cricket tournament that formed part of the qualification process for the 2026 Men's T20 World Cup. It was hosted by South Korea in September and October 2024.

Japan won the tournament, and advanced to the regional final, where it will be joined by Nepal, Oman and Papua New Guinea, who were given a bye after having participated in the previous T20 World Cup, and four other teams from Asia qualifiers along with the winners of EAP qualifier A.

== Squads ==
Indonesia	Japan	Philippines	South Korea
Kadek Gamantika (c); Gede Arta; Ketut Artawan; Ferdinando Banunaek; Danilson Hawoe; Dharma Kesuma; Maxi Koda; Gede Priandana; Kirubasankar Ramamoorthy; Ahmad Ramdoni (wk); Padmakar Surve; Anjar Tadarus; Gaurav Tiwari; Dewa Wiswi	Kendel Kadowaki-Fleming (c); Koji Hardgrave-Abe; Charles Hinze; Benjamin Ito-Davis; Kohei Kubota; Piyush Kumbhare; Wataru Miyauchi (wk); Sabaorish Ravichandran; Reo Sakurano-Thomas; Alexander Shirai-Patmore (wk); Declan Suzuki; Ibrahim Takahashi; Makoto Taniyama; Lachlan Yamamoto-Lake	Daniel Smith (c); Rhys Burinaga; Gurbhupinder Chohan; Andrew Donovan; Kepler Lukies; Huzaifa Mohammed; Liam Myott; Miggy Podosky; Arshdeep Samra; Kulwinder Sangha; Amanpreet Sirah; Nivek Tanner; Jonathon Tuffin; Henry Tyler	Jun Hyunwoo (c); Kim Daeyeon; Balage Dilruksha; Altaf Gill; ~~Kuldeep Gurjar~~; An Hyobeom; Lee Kangmin (wk); Aamir Lal; Sameera Maduranga; Iqbal Mudassir; Fazil Muhammad; Alam Nakash; Sameera Pitabeddara; Francois Pieters; Raja Shoaib (wk)

== Pre-tournament matches ==
25 September 2024
10:00
Scorecard

Japan; 104/9 (20 overs)	v	Indonesia; 100/6 (20 overs)
Kendel Kadowaki-Fleming 19 (13); Maxi Koda 3/14 (4 overs)		Padmakar Surve 36* (42); Sabaorish Ravichandran 2/11 (4 overs)

Japan won by 4 runs
Yeonhui Cricket Ground, Incheon
Umpires: Shahid Gill (Kor) and Sarika Prasad (Sin)
Player of the match: Charles Hinze (Jpn)

- Japan won the toss and elected to bat.

26 September 2024
10:00
Scorecard

Japan; 109/6 (14 overs)	v	Philippines; 62/8 (14 overs)
Kendel Kadowaki-Fleming 37 (22); Nivek Tanner 2/12 (1 over)		Daniel Smith 25 (16); Makoto Taniyama 2/11 (3 overs)

Japan won by 47 runs
Yeonhui Cricket Ground, Incheon
Umpires: Shahid Gill (Kor) and Sarika Prasad (Sin)
Player of the match: Kendel Kadowaki-Fleming (Jpn)

- Japan won the toss and elected to bat.
- The match was reduced to 14 overs per side due to rain.
- Rhys Burinaga, Andrew Donovan, Nivek Tanner and Jonathon Tuffin (Phi) all made their T20I debuts.

== Points table ==
Qualifier B standings
Pos	Team	Pld	W	L	NR	Pts	NRR	Qualification
1	Japan	6	6	0	0	12	3.527	Advanced to the regional final
2	Philippines	6	3	3	0	6	1.235	Eliminated
3	Indonesia	6	3	3	0	6	−1.834	Eliminated
4	South Korea (H)	6	0	6	0	0	−2.840	Eliminated

Source: ESPNcricinfo
(H) Host

== Fixtures ==
28 September 2024
10:00
Scorecard

Philippines; 96/9 (20 overs)	v	Japan; 97/8 (19.5 overs)
Kulwinderjeet Singh 33 (29); Sabaorish Ravichandran 2/7 (4 overs)		Wataru Miyauchi 23 (33); Jonathon Tuffin 4/22 (4 overs)

Japan won by 2 wickets
Yeonhui Cricket Ground, Incheon
Umpires: Tanvir Ahmed (Ban) and Suresh Subramanian (Idn)
Player of the match: Jonathon Tuffin (Phi)

- Philippines won the toss and elected to bat.

28 September 2024
14:00
Scorecard

South Korea; 99/6 (20 overs)	v	Indonesia; 100/8 (19.5 overs)
Balage Dilruksha 23 (29); Ferdinando Banunaek 3/14 (4 overs)		Gaurav Tiwari 18* (22); An Hyobeom 3/8 (3 overs)

Indonesia won by 2 wickets
Yeonhui Cricket Ground, Incheon
Umpires: Sarika Prasad (Sin) and Ashwani Kumar Rana (Tha)
Player of the match: An Hyobeom (Kor)

- South Korea won the toss and elected to bat.
- Balage Dilruksha, Sameera Maduranga, Fazil Muhammad and Sameera Pitabeddara (Kor) all made their T20I debuts.

29 September 2024
10:00
Scorecard

Philippines; 113/6 (20 overs)	v	Indonesia; 71 (18 overs)
Arashdeep Samra 55 (41); Maxi Koda 2/16 (3 overs); Ferdinando Banunaek 2/16 (3 overs)		Padmakar Surve 38* (45); Liam Myott 4/11 (4 overs)

Philippines won by 42 runs
Yeonhui Cricket Ground, Incheon
Umpires: Tanvir Ahmed (Ban) and Sarika Prasad (Sin)
Player of the match: Arashdeep Samra (Phi)

- Indonesia won the toss and elected to field.

29 September 2024
14:00
Scorecard

South Korea; 78 (20 overs)	v	Japan; 79/3 (11.1 overs)
Aamir Lal 29* (34); Sabaorish Ravichandran 3/11 (4 overs)		Kendel Kadowaki-Fleming 28* (28); Aamir Lal 2/12 (4 overs)

Japan won by 7 wickets
Yeonhui Cricket Ground, Incheon
Umpires: Ashwani Kumar Rana (Tha) and Suresh Subramanian (Idn)
Player of the match: Sabaorish Ravichandran (Jpn)

- South Korea won the toss and elected to bat.

1 October 2024
10:00
Scorecard

Japan; 121/4 (13 overs)	v	Indonesia; 68/5 (13 overs)
Kendel Kadowaki-Fleming 57 (29); Ketut Artawan 1/15 (1 over)		Danilson Hawoe 19* (15); Makoto Taniyama 2/10 (3 overs)

Japan won by 53 runs
Yeonhui Cricket Ground, Incheon
Umpires: Tanvir Ahmed (Ban) and Ashwani Kumar Rana (Tha)
Player of the match: Kendel Kadowaki-Fleming (Jpn)

- Indonesia won the toss and elected to field.
- The match was reduced to 13 overs per side due to rain.

1 October 2024
14:00
Scorecard

Philippines; 178/5 (20 overs)	v	South Korea; 141/9 (20 overs)
Arashdeep Samra 74* (54); Kim Daeyeon 3/29 (4 overs)		Aamir Lal 48 (23); Daniel Smith 3/18 (4 overs)

Philippines won by 37 runs
Yeonhui Cricket Ground, Incheon
Umpires: Sarika Prasad (Sin) and Suresh Subramanian (Idn)
Player of the match: Arashdeep Samra (Phi)

- South Korea won the toss and elected to field.

2 October 2024
10:00
Scorecard

Japan; 121/7 (20 overs)	v	Philippines; 94/9 (20 overs)
Lachlan Yamamoto-Lake 38 (45); Daniel Smith 3/23 (4 overs)		Miggy Podosky 31 (32); Ibrahim Takahashi 2/12 (4 overs)

Japan won by 27 runs
Yeonhui Cricket Ground, Incheon
Umpires: Ashwani Kumar Rana (Tha) and Suresh Subramanian (Idn)
Player of the match: Lachlan Yamamoto-Lake (Jpn)

- Japan won the toss and elected to bat.

2 October 2024
14:00
Scorecard

Indonesia; 141/3 (20 overs)	v	South Korea; 114/6 (20 overs)
Anjar Tadarus 43 (47); Aamir Lal 1/17 (4 overs)		Raja Shoaib 27* (27); Ferdinando Banunaek 3/18 (3 overs)

Indonesia won by 27 runs
Yeonhui Cricket Ground, Incheon
Umpires: Tanvir Ahmed (Ban) and Sarika Prasad (Sin)
Player of the match: Anjar Tadarus (Idn)

- Indonesia won the toss and elected to bat.
- Altaf Gill (Kor) made his T20I debut.

4 October 2024
10:00
Scorecard

Indonesia; 101/8 (20 overs)	v	Philippines; 98/9 (20 overs)
Padmakar Surve 35* (30); Amanpreet Sirah 3/16 (4 overs)		Jonathon Tuffin 32* (35); Gaurav Tiwari 3/13 (4 overs)

Indonesia won by 3 runs
Yeonhui Cricket Ground, Incheon
Umpires: Tanvir Ahmed (Ban) and Ashwani Kumar Rana (Tha)
Player of the match: Gaurav Tiwari (Idn)

- Indonesia won the toss and elected to bat.

4 October 2024
14:00
Scorecard

Japan; 155/7 (20 overs)	v	South Korea; 47 (19 overs)
Kendel Kadowaki-Fleming 74 (56); Fazil Muhammad 4/27 (4 overs)		Sameera Maduranga 14 (35); Benjamin Ito-Davis 3/8 (4 overs)

Japan won by 108 runs
Yeonhui Cricket Ground, Incheon
Umpires: Sarika Prasad (Sin) and Suresh Subramanian (Idn)
Player of the match: Kendel Kadowaki-Fleming (Jpn)

- Japan won the toss and elected to bat.

5 October 2024
10:00
Scorecard

Philippines; 158/5 (20 overs)	v	South Korea; 57 (16.1 overs)
Daniel Smith 47 (36); Sameera Maduranga 2/16 (3 overs)		Aamir Lal 16 (27); Kepler Lukies 4/11 (4 overs)

Philippines won by 101 runs
Yeonhui Cricket Ground, Incheon
Umpires: Suresh Subramanian (Idn) and Tanvir Ahmed (Ban)
Player of the match: Kepler Lukies (Phi)

- Philippines won the toss and elected to bat.
- Francois Pieters (Kor) made his T20I debut.

5 October 2024
14:00
Scorecard

Japan; 173/2 (20 overs)	v	Indonesia; 29 (10.5 overs)
Kendel Kadowaki-Fleming 85* (64); Gaurav Tiwari 1/23 (4 overs)		Ahmad Ramdoni 6 (3); Piyush Kumbhare 3/8 (3 overs)

Japan won by 144 runs
Yeonhui Cricket Ground, Incheon
Umpires: Sarika Prasad (Sin) and Ashwani Kumar Rana (Tha)
Player of the match: Kendel Kadowaki-Fleming (Jpn)

- Japan won the toss and elected to bat.
