= Ili Tugaga =

New Zealand cricketer (born 1990)

Personal information
- Full name: Malaesaili Julian Tugaga
- Born: 16 February 1990 (age 36); Wellington, New Zealand
- Batting: Left-handed
- Bowling: Right-arm medium-fast

International information
- National side: Samoa
- T20I debut (cap 40): 8 October 2025 v Oman
- Last T20I: 9 October 2025 v Papua New Guinea

Domestic team information
- Years: Team
- 2009–2015: Wellington

Career statistics
Competition	FC	LA	T20
Matches	27	10	5
Runs scored	363	73	–
Batting average	10.67	24.33	–
100s/50s	1/0	0/0	–
Top score	103	32*	–
Balls bowled	4,070	408	96
Wickets	62	5	6
Bowling average	41.04	87.60	17.00
5 wickets in innings	1	0	0
10 wickets in match	0	0	0
Best bowling	5/77	2/56	4/18
Catches/stumpings	11/–	1/–	1/–
- Source: Cricinfo, 27 October 2020

Ili Tugaga (born 16 February 1990) is a New Zealand cricketer. He played in 27 first-class, 10 List A, and 5 Twenty20 matches for Wellington from 2009 and 2015.

== See also ==
- List of Wellington representative cricketers
