= Ofisa Tonu'u =

NZ & Samoa international rugby union player & cricketer

- Born: Ofisa Francis Junior Tonu'u; 3 February 1970 (age 56) Wellington, New Zealand
- Height: 1.78 m (5 ft 10 in)
- Weight: 94 kg (207 lb)
- School: Rongotai College

Rugby union career
- Position: Halfback
Senior career
Years	Team	Apps	(Points)
1999–2001	London Irish		
2001–2003	Newport	45	(87)
Provincial / State sides
Years	Team	Apps	(Points)
1991–1992	Wellington	14	
1993–1999	Auckland	71	
Super Rugby
Years	Team	Apps	(Points)
1996–1998	Blues	32	(55)
1999	Hurricanes	9	(5)
International career
Years	Team	Apps	(Points)
1992–1993	Samoa	5	
1996–1998	New Zealand	5	(0)
- Cricket career

Cricket information
- Batting: Right-handed
- Role: Wicket-keeper

International information
- National side: Samoa
- T20I debut (cap 11): 8 July 2019 v PNG
- Last T20I: 12 July 2019 v Vanuatu
Medal record
Representing Samoa
Men's cricket
Pacific Games
Bronze medal – third place	2019 Apia	Twenty20 International
- Source: Cricinfo, 19 July 2019

Ofisa Francis Junior Tonu'u (born 3 February 1970) is a New Zealand former rugby union player and Samoa cricketer.

== Rugby union ==
A halfback, Tonu'u represented Wellington and Auckland at the provincial level and the Blues and Hurricanes in Super Rugby. Of Samoan parentage, Tonu'u played 14 matches including five tests for Samoa in 1992 and 1993. He was later a member of the New Zealand national side, the All Blacks, from 1996 to 1998. He played eight matches for the All Blacks including five internationals.

== Cricket ==
He played as a right-handed wicket-keeper batsman. In 2013, he was a member of the Auckland Cricket Society Premier Men's Cricket team. He still plays for Auckland Cricket Society in annual fixtures.

In July 2019, at the age of 49, Tonu'u represented the Samoa national cricket team in the men's tournament at the 2019 Pacific Games. He made his Twenty20 International (T20I) debut against Papua New Guinea on 8 July 2019.

On January 18, 2025, Tonu'u became the only player to participate in all 7 matches as wicket-keeper for Team Rugby in the annual Black Clash at Hagley Oval, Christchurch.

== Match Fit ==
Tonu'u made his debut for Match Fit: Union vs. League in 2024. He was revealed to be at risk of diabetes and high blood pressure. On episode 3, he revealed that he travelled to Eden Park to his house in West Harbour, West Auckland on foot. At the final weigh-in, he managed to lose enough weight to be out of the danger zone for cardiovascular diseases. In the final game, he was named as a hooker for rugby union and rugby league.
