= Vinayak Shukla =

Indian–born Omani cricketer (born 1994)

Personal information
- Born: 18 June 1994 (age 32); Kanpur, Uttar Pradesh, India
- Batting: Right-handed
- Role: Batsman, wicket-keeper

International information
- National side: Oman (2024–present)
- ODI debut (cap 38): 10 February 2025 v Namibia
- Last ODI: 27 May 2025 v United States
- T20I debut (cap 41): 14 December 2024 v Qatar
- Last T20I: 30 September 2025 v Kuwait

Career statistics
Competition	ODI	T20I
Matches	8	13
Runs scored	144	288
Batting average	24.00	28.80
100s/50s	0/0	0/2
Top score	46	52*
Catches/stumpings	9/3	5/1
- Source: ESPNcricinfo, 3 October 2025

Vinayak Shukla (born 18 June 1994) is an Indian-born cricketer who plays for the Oman national cricket team as a right-handed wicket-keeper–batsman and currently serves as the captain of the team. He made his debut for the Omani national side at the 2024 Men's Gulf T20I Championship tournament.

== Early life ==
Shukla was born on 18 June 1994 in Kanpur, Uttar Pradesh. He picked up cricket in his childhood, and in the later years he got into Club cricket. During his club career, he represented Private Sports Enterprises and played against Kuldeep Yadav regularly.

Back in India, he was also part of Kolkata Knight Riders' net sessions, where got guidance from the likes of Dinesh Karthik.

== International career ==
Shukla moved to Oman in 2021 in search of better opportunities, following suggestions from one of his coaches. He then took up a Data operator job at National Metal Cans in Seeb to support his daily expenses.

In December 2024, he was named in Oman's squad for the 2024 Men's Gulf T20I Championship. He made his Twenty20 International (T20I) debut in the team's first match against Qatar. He ended up being third-highest run scorer for Oman in the tournament, scoring 134 runs in 5 matches including a half-century in their last match.

He made his One Day International (ODI) debut for Oman in February 2025 against Namibia during the ninth round of the 2024–2026 Cricket World Cup League 2. In the match, he excelled with his wicket-keeping skills as he took three catches behind the wicket.

In September 2025, Shukla was named in Oman's squad for their debut appearance at the 2025 Asia Cup. In December 2025, he was named as the team's vice-captain for the 2026 Men's T20 World Cup.

In July 2026, he was named captain of Oman, succeeding Jatinder Singh.
