= Ross Taylor =

New Zealand cricketer

Ross Taylor CNZM
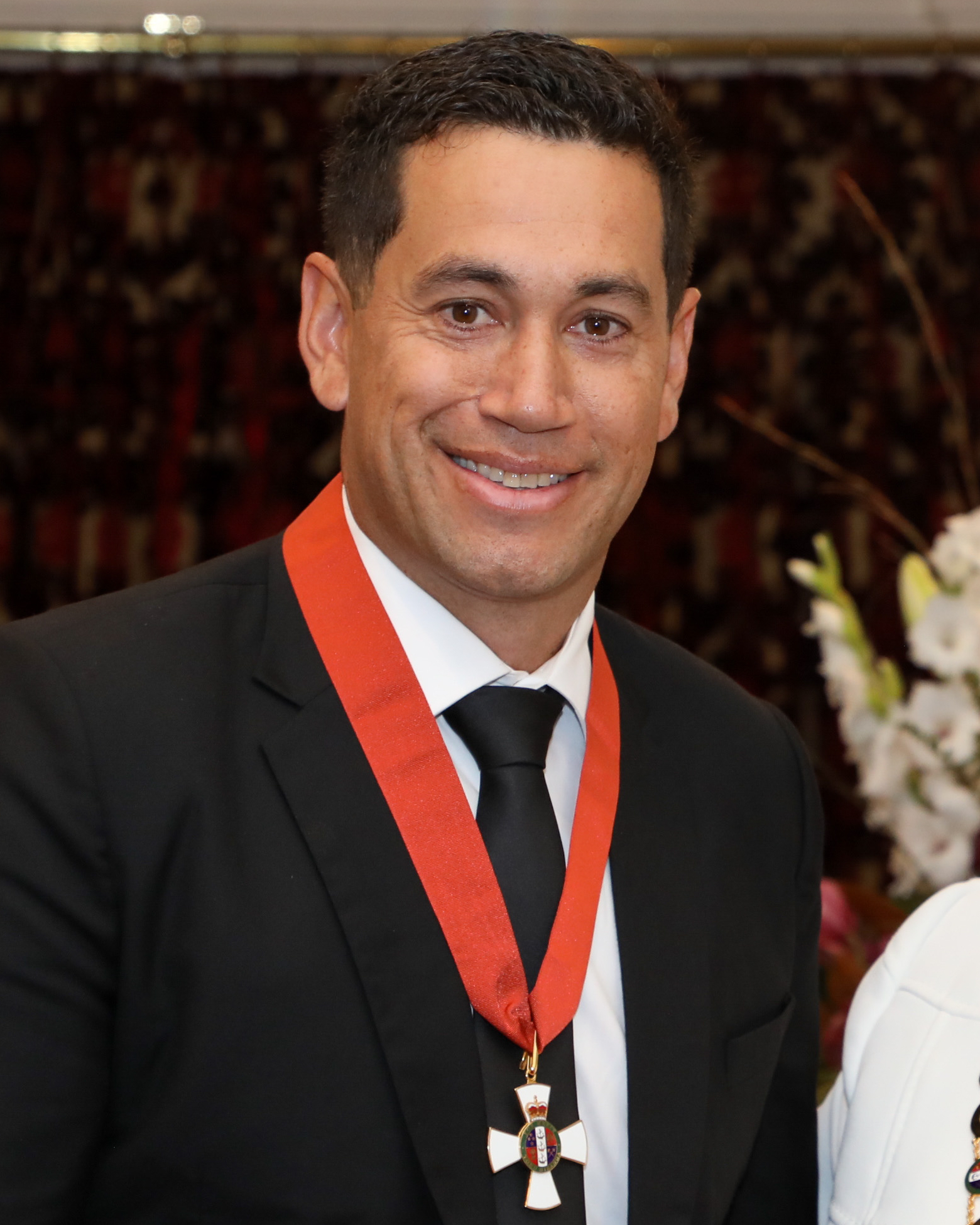
- Taylor in 2023

Personal information
- Full name: Luteru Ross Poutoa Lote Taylor
- Born: 8 March 1984 (age 42); Lower Hutt, Wellington, New Zealand
- Nickname: Rosco
- Height: 1.85 m (6 ft 1 in)
- Batting: Right-handed
- Bowling: Right-arm off break
- Role: Middle-order batsman

International information
- National sides: New Zealand (2006–2022); Samoa (2025)
- Test debut (cap 234): 8 November 2007; New Zealand v South Africa
- Last Test: 9 January 2022; New Zealand v Bangladesh
- ODI debut (cap 144): 1 March 2006; New Zealand v West Indies
- Last ODI: 4 April 2022; New Zealand v Netherlands
- ODI shirt no.: 3
- T20I debut (cap 22/39): 22 December 2006; New Zealand v Sri Lanka
- Last T20I: 15 October 2025; Samoa v UAE

Domestic team information
- Years: Team
- 2002/03–2022/23: Central Districts
- 2008–2010: Royal Challengers Bangalore
- 2009/10: Victoria
- 2010: Durham
- 2011: Rajasthan Royals
- 2012, 2014: Delhi Daredevils
- 2013: Pune Warriors India
- 2013–2014: Trinidad and Tobago Red Steel
- 2015: St Lucia Zouks
- 2016–2017: Sussex
- 2018: Nottinghamshire
- 2018: Jamaica Tallawahs
- 2019: Middlesex
- 2020: Guyana Amazon Warriors

Career statistics
Competition	Test	ODI	T20I	FC
Matches	112	236	106	192
Runs scored	7,683	8,607	1,954	12,369
Batting average	44.66	47.55	26.05	41.78
100s/50s	19/35	21/51	0/7	27/65
Top score	290	181*	63	290
Balls bowled	99	42	–	687
Wickets	3	0	–	7
Bowling average	16.00	–	–	54.00
5 wickets in innings	0	–	–	0
10 wickets in match	0	–	–	0
Best bowling	2/4	–	–	2/4
Catches/stumpings	163/–	142/–	49/–	249/–
Medal record
Men's Cricket
Representing New Zealand
ICC World Test Championship
Winner	2019–2021
ICC Cricket World Cup
Runner-up	2015 Australia and New Zealand
Runner-up	2019 England and Wales
- Source: ESPNcricinfo, 25 September 2026

Luteru Ross Poutoa Lote Taylor CNZM (born 8 March 1984) is a Samoan international cricketer and former New Zealand international cricketer who served as the captain of the New Zealand national team. Batting predominantly at number four, when he announced his retirement from international cricket at the end of 2021 he was the leading run-scorer for New Zealand in Test and One Day International cricket. Taylor was a key member of the New Zealand team that won the 2019–2021 ICC World Test Championship, where he scored the winning boundary in the final. He was also a part of the New Zealand squads to finish as runners-up in two Cricket World Cup finals in 2015 and 2019.

In February 2020, Taylor played his 100th Test match for New Zealand, becoming the first cricketer to play in 100 matches in all three formats of international cricket. In December 2020, in the first Test against Pakistan, Taylor became the most-capped player for New Zealand in international cricket, playing in his 438th match across all three formats, surpassing Daniel Vettori; in December 2021, he announced that he would retire from international cricket after the one-day series against Australia and the Netherlands in early 2022. On 4 April 2022, Taylor played in his 450th and final international match for New Zealand, his last match being an ODI against the Netherlands.

In 2025, Taylor, whose mother is Samoan, announced that he was coming out of retirement to represent the Samoa national cricket team in its attempt to qualify for the 2026 T20 World Cup. He made his Twenty20 International debut for Samoa on 8 October 2025.

== Personal life ==
Taylor was born on 8 March 1984 in Lower Hutt, New Zealand. He is the son of Neil Taylor and Naoupu Lote-Taylor. His father is originally from Masterton and his mother is a Samoan from Saluafata on the island of Upolu. He carries the hereditary Samoan language title of leaupepe from the village of Fasito'o Uta.

Taylor was introduced to cricket by his father, but also grew up playing kilikiti, the traditional Samoan variant of cricket. He was educated at Wairarapa College and Palmerston North Boys High School and was a hockey player before shifting his focus to cricket. Taylor married Victoria in 2011. They have three children.

== Domestic and T20 franchise career ==
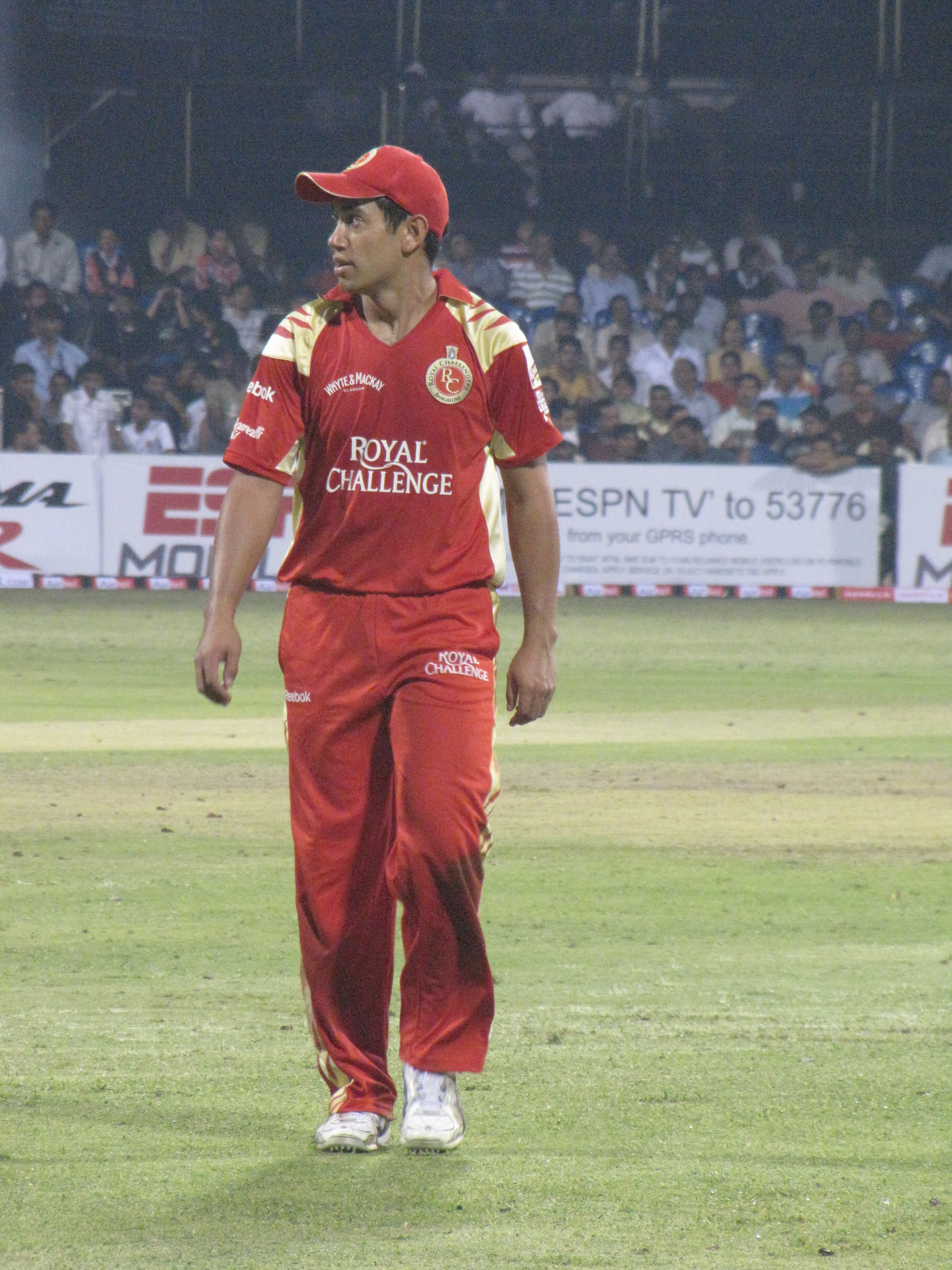
Taylor playing for Royal Challengers Bangalore in 2009

Taylor played domestically for Central Districts. He played under-17 and under-19 cricket for the team and Hawke Cup cricket for Manawatu, before making his senior debut in January 2003 in a State Shield one-day match against Canterbury. He made his first-class cricket debut against the same team later in the same month and placed his first Twenty20 cricket match in January 2006 in the inaugural New Zealand Twenty20 Competition. In the 2009–10 HRV Cup Final against Auckland, Taylor scored a match-winning 80 runs off 30 balls; he added 133 runs from 53 balls in a partnership with Kieran Noema-Barnett and hit Michael Bates for 27 runs in one over, including three consecutive sixes. In total Taylor hit eight sixes and five fours. In February 2021, during the 2020–21 Ford Trophy, Taylor played in his 300th List A match.

Taylor played club cricket in England during his early career. He played matches for MCC Young Cricketers between 2002 and 2004, including in the Second Eleven Trophy, and played club cricket for Norwich Wanderers in the Norfolk Cricket League in 2004. In 2009/10 he played for Victoria in the Australian Big Bash competition before playing English county cricket for Durham in the 2010 Friends Provident T20 tournament, his most substantial contribution being 80 not out from only 33 balls, including three fours and nine sixes. In 2016 and 2017, he played for Sussex and for Nottinghamshire in 2018. He joined Middlesex for the 2019 Royal London One-day Cup competition.

Taylor was signed by Royal Challengers Bangalore for the 2008 Indian Premier League before moving to Rajasthan Royals in the 2011 league auction and in 2012 joined Delhi Daredevils for a season before being traded to Pune Warriors India for Ashish Nehra ahead of the 2013 season. He returned to play for Delhi in the 2014 season.

He played for Trinidad and Tobago Red Steel in the 2013 and 2014 editions of the Caribbean Premier League and for St Lucia Zouks in 2015. He returned to the league for the 2018 competition, playing for Jamaica Tallawahs before appearing for Guyana Amazon Warriors in the 2020 Caribbean Premier League.

== International career ==
Taylor first played for the New Zealand under-19 team in January 2001. He played under-19 Test and One Day International matches and captained the team. He was a member of the New Zealand Cricket Academy and played for the New Zealand A team in 2003/04 and 2004/05.

=== International debut ===
Taylor made his full international debut for New Zealand on 1 March 2006, in a one-day match against the West Indies. He became the second male player of Samoan heritage to play for New Zealand after Murphy Su'a. He scored only 15 runs in the match.

Taylor is a clean striker of the ball, particularly any ball through leg side, and a useful off-break bowler. Taylor scored his maiden one day century in front of a delighted crowd in Napier, playing against Sri Lanka on 28 December 2006. The innings included 12 fours and 6 sixes. Unluckily for him, New Zealand were comprehensively beaten in that game, by a blistering knock by Sanath Jayasuriya. He also suffered dehydration and required a short hospital trip during the second innings. Taylor hit 84 against Australia in their opening game in the 2006–07 Commonwealth Bank Series, but lost the match at the end. He also established one of the most potent no.3-no.4 top order partnership with Kane Williamson since the latter made his debut.

Taylor scored his second century in his ODI career on 18 February 2007 against Australia. He scored 117, the 2nd highest score by a New Zealander against Australia at that time. He scored his maiden Test century in March 2008 at Hamilton in the first Test of the 2007–08 series against England and went on to be the leading run scorer for the series.

Taylor scored what was then a Test match career-best of 154* against England at Old Trafford in May 2008, a brilliant innings including 5 sixes and 17 fours. His third Test century, an innings of 151 runs off 204 balls, came against India at Napier in March 2009. His fourth Test century, in the next Test, was a 107 which delayed India's victory long enough to force a draw.

=== Captaincy ===
Taylor captained New Zealand for the first time in an ODI against Australia in Napier on 3 March 2010, when Daniel Vettori dropped out of the team less than 30 minutes before the start with a neck ache. Taylor top-scored with 70 and New Zealand won by two wickets with four balls to spare. Taylor was also awarded the Man of the Match and donated the $NZ 500 prize to the Lansdowne Cricket Club in Masterton.

Taylor has served as the national captain for all formats.

=== 2011 World Cup ===
He made his then highest ODI score of 131* which came off 124 balls against Pakistan on 8 March 2011 at the ICC Cricket World Cup. His innings included seven sixes and eight fours and contributed to New Zealand making 127 runs in the final 9 overs of the game to reach the score of 301. With this century, Taylor became only the fourth batsman in history of the game that scored an ODI century in a birthday, after Vinod Kambli, Sachin Tendulkar, and Sanath Jayasuriya.

=== Late captaincy ===
In a match against Australia at Hamilton in March 2010, Taylor made the fastest Test century ever by a New Zealander, bringing up his hundred off only 81 balls. Taylor scored centuries in all three tests in the 2013/14 series against the West Indies. In the first Test, Taylor made his first Test match double-century and highest test score of unbeaten 217 in a composed and classy innings. Taylor's 12th ODI century against Pakistan at Dubai coincides with the 100th century for the Black Caps.

For his performances in the 2012–13 and 2013–14 seasons, he won the Sir Richard Hadlee Medal.

=== Australia 2015 ===
The best Test innings of his life came during the second test of Trans-Tasman Trophy in 2015–16 season in Australia. He scored his second double hundred and became the highest score by a New Zealand batsman in away Tests and in Australian soil as well. With this feat, he also became the first Kiwi batsman to score a Test double-hundred against Australia and the 2nd fastest among his countrymen to reach 5,000 Test career runs (in 120 innings). During the inning, his partnership with Kane Williamson of 265-run for the third wicket, which was New Zealand's highest of all time against Australia for any wicket. Taylor was dismissed for 290 runs with 43 fours.

In December 2016, after the Test against Pakistan at Hamilton, Taylor underwent surgery to remove a pterygium on his left eye. He was out of action for several weeks, thus missing the Chappell-Hadlee Trophy series in Australia.

=== South Africa 2017 ===
Taylor scored his 17th ODI century during the second ODI against South Africa at Hagley Oval. With this, he became the highest ODI century maker for New Zealand, beating 16 ODI centuries by Nathan Astle. In this match, Taylor also became New Zealand's quickest batsman to reach 6000 runs in ODI as well. New Zealand finally won the match by 6 runs. Ross Taylor also became only the sixth player in ODI history to score centuries against all test playing nations and first from New Zealand.

=== England 2018 ===
Taylor scored a century in first ODI against England in a man of the match performance for his team and became the third New Zealander to score 7000 ODI runs. In the 4th ODI, he probably played the best innings of his career as he made an unbeaten 181 off 147 balls in a successful run chase of 336 runs. His 181* is the 2nd highest ODI score for a no.4 batsman as well 4th highest score for an individual while chasing. In that match, he also passed Nathan Astle to become New Zealand's second top scorer in ODIs. Although, New Zealand lost the series, he was the top run getter with 304 runs in that 5-match series.

=== 2019 ===
On 28 January 2019, Taylor became the third New Zealand batsman to complete 1000 runs in ODIs against India, he achieved this feat when he was batting on 14* and went on to score 93 (106).

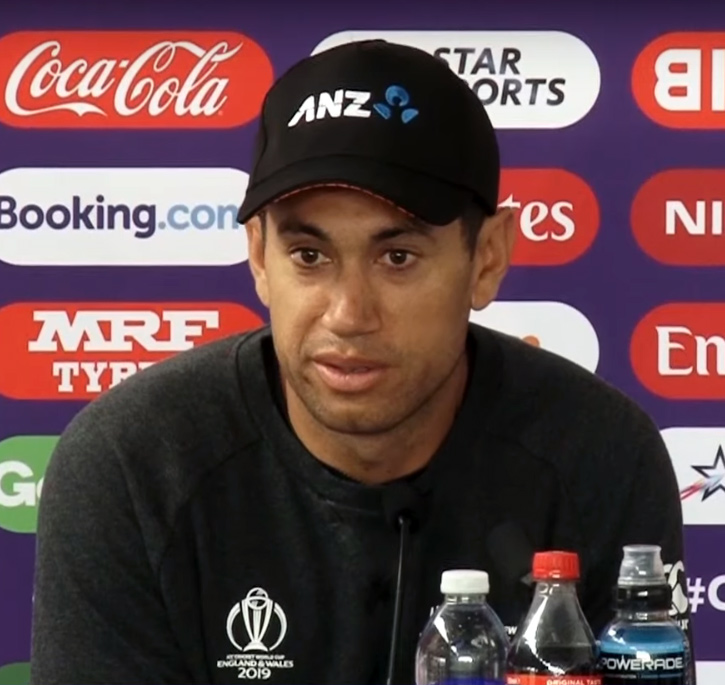
Taylor at a media conference during the 2019 Cricket World Cup

In April 2019, he was named in New Zealand's squad for the 2019 Cricket World Cup. On 5 June 2019, in New Zealand's match against Bangladesh, Taylor played in his 400th international match for New Zealand in which he scored a match-winning 82. He also became the 2nd batsman to score 8000 ODI runs for New Zealand, after Stephen Fleming, as well as outscoring him in the same match to become New Zealand's top scorer in ODIs. He followed it with 48 off 52 against Afghanistan in another successful run-chase.

In the game against West Indies, he provided stability scoring 69 after his team had lost both of the openers in the first over itself. He scored runs of 30 and 28 in losses against Australia and England, respectively. In the tournament's first semi-final, he top scored for New Zealand with 74 runs as they reached the World Cup final for second consecutive time. He could only make 15 runs, before being wrongly given LBW off Mark Wood's bowling, in the final as New Zealand lost it on boundary count.

=== 2020 home summer and retirement ===
During India's tour of New Zealand he scored 2 half-centuries in T20I series, in the 1st T20I he scored 54 off 27 and in 5th T20I he scored 53 off 47. During the same tour he also scored a century and half-century in the ODI series, in the 1st ODI he scored 109* off 84 and awarded Man of the Match and in 2nd ODI he scored 73* off 74 for his performance he was awarded Man of the Series.

On 21 February 2020, Taylor became the first player ever to play 100 matches in each format of the game T20I, ODI and Tests during the first Test match against India, and became the fourth New Zealand player to play 100 Test matches after Stephen Fleming, Daniel Vettori and Brendon McCullum and 66th overall.

In his 100th Test, Taylor scored 44 off 71 in the first innings and did not bat in the second innings. New Zealand won the match by 10 wickets which marked 100 Test victories for them.

On 30 December 2021, Taylor announced his retirement from international cricket at the end of the 2021/22 summer, with his final Test series being against Bangladesh, and last ODIs against the Netherlands and Australia.

In the 2022 Queen's Birthday and Platinum Jubilee Honours, Taylor was appointed a Companion of the New Zealand Order of Merit, for services to cricket and Pacific communities.

=== Playing for Samoa ===
In April 2025, Taylor became eligible to represent Samoa due to his mother's heritage. He opted to come out retirement to play for the Samoa national cricket team and in September was named in the Samoan squad for the 2025 Men's T20 World Cup Asia–EAP Regional Final.

== International centuries ==
Taylor has scored 40 centuries in international cricket, 19 in Tests and 21 in ODIs.

== Autobiography ==
In his autobiography published in 2022, titled Ross Taylor: Black & White, he revealed that he faced racism within New Zealand Cricket, as some players and officials made comments about his ethnicity. Belonging to Samoan heritage, Taylor stated that he experienced racism during his international career with the New Zealand Cricket Team. He also mentioned being slapped by an owner of the Rajasthan Royals for getting dismissed for a duck during the 2011 Indian Premier League.
