= List of Samoa Twenty20 International cricketers =

This is a list of Samoan Twenty20 International cricketers.

In April 2018, the ICC decided to grant full Twenty20 International (T20I) status to all its members. Therefore, all Twenty20 matches played between Samoa and other ICC members after 1 January 2019 have the T20I status.

This list comprises all members of the Samoa cricket team who have played at least one T20I match. It is arranged in alphabetical order by last name from Samoa's first Twenty20 International. Samoa played their first matches with T20I status during the 2019 Pacific Games, which took place from 8 to 13 July 2019 in Apia, Samoa.

== Key ==
General

- ‡ – Captain
- † – Wicket-keeper
- First – Year of debut
- Last – Year of latest game
- Mat – Number of matches played

Batting

- Runs – Runs scored in career
- HS – Highest score
- Avg – Runs scored per dismissal
- * – Batsman remained not out
- 50 – Number of half centuries
- 100 - Number of 100

Bowling

- Balls – Balls bowled in career
- Wkt – Wickets taken in career
- BBI – Best bowling in an innings
- Ave – Average runs per wicket

Fielding

- Ca – Catches taken
- St – Stumpings affected

== List of players ==
Statistics are correct as of 18 May 2026.

Samoa T20I cricketers
General					Batting					Bowling				Fielding		Ref
No.	Name	First	Last	Mat	Runs	HS	Avg	50	100	Balls	Wkt	BBI	Ave	Ca	St	Ref
1	James Baker‡	2019	2022	10	68	40*	22.66	0	0	144	6	2/32	31.50	6	0	
2	Daniel Burgess	2019	2026	16	42	16*	6.00	0	0	170	10	3/47	23.30	5	0	
3	Sean Cotter	2019	2026	23	296	51	16.44	1	0	–	–	–	–	6	0	
4	Lester Evile	2019	2019	4	6	6	6.00	0	0	72	3	1/0	22.33	1	0	
5	Benjamin Mailata‡†	2019	2026	20	272	39	17.00	0	0	102	3	1/27	59.66	5	0	
6	Andrew Michael	2019	2022	10	134	23	16.75	0	0	76	2	1/15	43.50	3	0	
7	Dom Michael‡	2019	2022	10	250	63*	31.25	3	0	62	4	2/37	26.00	3	0	
8	Faasao Mulivai	2019	2019	4	70	48	17.50	0	0	1	0	–	–	1	0	
9	Samson Sola	2019	2026	25	99	18	7.07	0	0	365	22	3/10	18.00	8	0	
10	Saumani Tiai	2019	2026	33	319	45	14.50	0	0	690	43	5/27	18.18	3	0	
11	Ofisa Tonu'u†	2019	2019	4	13	6*	6.50	0	0	–	–	–	–	3	0	
12	Caleb Jasmat‡	2022	2026	30	367	42*	17.47	0	0	490	18	2/22	29.61	7	0	
13	Uala Kaisala†	2022	2023	8	109	35*	15.57	0	0	12	0	–	–	1	1	
14	Douglas Finau	2022	2025	17	33	14*	6.60	0	0	96	5	3/34	31.00	7	0	
15	Uili Sofi	2022	2022	3	8	8	8.00	0	0	30	1	1/5	48.00	1	0	
16	Fereti Suluoto	2022	2026	30	282	44*	14.84	0	0	6	0	–	–	12	0	
17	Bismarck Schuster	2022	2022	2	–	–	–	–	–	24	1	1/11	27.00	2	0	
18	Darren Roache	2022	2025	12	169	55	18.77	1	0	66	6	3/23	15.33	2	0	
19	Matthew Faatea	2023	2023	3	5	4	1.66	0	0	60	3	2/23	29.33	1	0	
20	Liuone Fereti	2023	2023	3	15	14*	7.50	0	0	–	–	–	–	1	0	
21	Maletino Maiava†	2023	2025	5	52	34	17.33	0	0	24	0	–	–	3	0	
22	Bondi Pita	2023	2023	1	17	17	17.00	0	0	–	–	–	–	0	0	
23	Josef Pita	2023	2023	3	59	46	19.66	0	0	–	–	–	–	1	0	
24	Timezeen Rapi	2023	2023	3	42	28	14.00	0	0	66	4	3/18	15.50	0	0	
25	Paul Rarotoga	2023	2023	3	80	56	26.66	1	0	36	0	–	–	1	0	
26	Sitanisilao Toutai‡	2023	2023	3	12	9	4.00	0	0	72	3	2/36	41.00	0	0	
27	Maene Tuilaepa	2023	2023	2	11	9*	11.00	0	0	24	2	1/3	18.00	0	0	
28	Aoga Leutogi	2023	2023	2	13	13*	–	0	0	–	–	–	–	0	0	
29	Afapene Ilaoa†	2023	2025	10	35	12	5.83	0	0	18	2	2/28	14.00	8	1	
30	Noah Mead	2024	2026	14	13	7*	3.25	0	0	192	10	2/10	25.20	3	0	
31	Solomon Nash	2024	2026	23	93	21*	7.75	0	0	398	24	4/12	19.75	4	0	
32	Punapunavale Sua	2024	2024	2	0	0	0.00	0	0	–	–	–	–	0	0	
33	Darius Visser	2024	2026	23	845	132	46.94	3	3	401	25	4/11	17.88	11	0	
34	Tineimoli Misi	2024	2024	2	1	1	1.00	0	0	–	–	–	–	0	0	
35	Samuel French†	2025	2026	16	110	27	12.22	0	0	–	–	–	–	6	1	
36	Kurtis Hynam-Nyberg	2025	2025	7	3	2	3.00	0	0	108	5	2/36	33.00	0	0	
37	Elika Faalupega	2025	2025	2	2	2	1.00	0	0	24	2	2/24	12.00	0	0	
38	Sean Solia	2025	2026	12	338	74	30.72	2	0	12	0	–	–	2	0	
39	Ross Taylor (Note: Ross Taylor also played 102 T20Is for New Zealand. Only his records for Samoa are mentioned above.)	2025	2025	4	45	22	22.50	0	0	–	–	–	–	3	0	
40	Ili Tugaga	2025	2026	4	3	3*	3.00	0	0	66	2	2/15	34.50	1	0	
