= Faleata Oval =

Cricket ground

- Faleata Oval 1

Ground information
- Location: Apia
- Capacity: n/a
- Owner: Samoa International Cricket Association
- Tenants: Samoa national cricket team

International information
- First T20I: 8 July 2019: Samoa v Papua New Guinea
- Last T20I: 9 July 2019: Samoa v Vanuatu
- First WT20I: 9 July 2019: Samoa v Vanuatu
- Last WT20I: 13 July 2019: Samoa v Papua New Guinea

Faleata Oval
- Faleata Oval 2

Ground information
- Location: Apia
- Capacity: n/a
- Owner: Cricket Samoa
- Tenants: Samoa national cricket team

International information
- First T20I: 10 July 2019: Samoa v Papua New Guinea
- Last T20I: 24 August 2024: Samoa v Vanuatu
- As of 24 August 2024; Source: Cricinfo

Faleata Oval
- Faleata Oval 3

Ground information
- Location: Apia
- Capacity: n/a
- Owner: Cricket Samoa
- Tenants: Samoa national cricket team

International information
- First T20I: 9 July 2019: Papua New Guinea v Vanuatu
- Last T20I: 12 July 2019: Samoa v Vanuatu

Faleata Oval
- Faleata oval 4

Ground information
- Location: Apia
- Capacity: n/a
- Owner: Cricket Samoa
- Tenants: Samoa national cricket team

International information
- First WT20I: 9 July 2019: Fiji v Papua New Guinea
- Last WT20I: 12 July 2019: Papua New Guinea v Vanuatu

Faleata Ovals are four cricket grounds in Apia, Samoa. The ground is owned by the Samoa International Cricket Association. It has hosted matches in the 2019 Pacific Games from 8 to 13 July 2019.

== International record ==
=== Faleata Oval 2 ===
==== Twenty20 International five-wicket hauls ====
The following table summarizes the five-wicket hauls taken in T20Is at this venue.

#	Figures	Player	Country	Innings	Opponent	Date	Result
1	5/36	Joshua Rasu	Vanuatu	1	Papua New Guinea	12 July 2019	Lost
2	5/17	Norman Vanua	Papua New Guinea	2	Vanuatu	13 July 2019	Won

=== T20I centuries ===
One T20I centuries have been scored at the venue.

No.	Score	Player	Team	Balls	Opposing team	Date	Result
1	112*	Hayden Dickson	Cook Islands	57	Vanuatu	17 August 2024	Won

=== Faleata Oval 3 ===
==== Twenty20 International five-wicket hauls ====
The following table summarizes the five-wicket hauls taken in T20Is at this venue.

#	Figures	Player	Country	Innings	Opponent	Date	Result
1	5/15	Damien Ravu	Papua New Guinea	1	Vanuatu	9 July 2019	Won
2	5/19	Nalin Nipiko	Vanuatu	2	Papua New Guinea	13 July 2019	Lost
