= 2024 Men's Gulf T20I Championship =

International cricket tournament

- Dates: 13 – 21 December 2024
- Administrator: International League T20
- Cricket format: Twenty20 International
- Tournament format(s): Round-robin and final
- Host: United Arab Emirates
- Champions: United Arab Emirates (1st title)
- Runners-up: Kuwait
- Participants: 6
- Matches: 16
- Player of the series: (Kuwait) Meet Bhavsar
- Most runs: (Kuwait) Meet Bhavsar (222)
- Most wickets: (United Arab Emirates) Junaid Siddique (12)

The 2024 ILT20 Men's Gulf T20I Championship was a Twenty20 International (T20I) cricket tournament that took place in the United Arab Emirates in December 2024. The event was organised by the International League T20. The participating teams were the hosts United Arab Emirates along with Bahrain, Kuwait, Oman, Saudi Arabia and Qatar. The top two sides in the round-robin advanced to the final. The round-robin matches were played at the ICC Academy Ground in Dubai, and the final was played at the Dubai International Cricket Stadium.

Oman were the defending champions, having defeated United Arab Emirates in the final of the 2023 edition by 5 wickets.

United Arab Emirates defeated Kuwait by 2 runs in the final.

== Squads ==
Bahrain	Kuwait	Oman	Qatar	Saudi Arabia	United Arab Emirates
Haider Ali (c); Abdul Majid Abbasi; Asif Ali; Fiaz Ahmed; Sarfaraz Ali; Imran Anwar; Junaid Aziz; Muhammed Basil; Ahmer Bin Nasir; Rizwan Butt; Imran Khan; Prashant Kurup (wk); Muhammad Salman; Sai Sarthak	Mohammed Aslam (c); Clinto Anto; Mirza Ahmed; Mohammad Amin; Meet Bhavsar; Muhammad Aqif Farooq; Adnan Idrees; Sayed Monib; Usman Patel (wk); Yasin Patel; Ravija Sandaruwan; Mohamed Shafeeq; Bilal Tahir; Mohammad Umar	Jatinder Singh (c); Wasim Ali; Shakeel Ahmed; Mehran Khan; Aamir Kaleem; Hammad Mirza (wk); Sufyan Mehmood; Mohammad Nadeem; Ashish Odedara; Jay Odedra; Muzahir Raza; Samay Shrivastava; Vinayak Shukla (wk); Karan Sonavale	Mohammed Rizlan (c, wk); Mohammad Ahnaff; Saqlain Arshad; Muhammad Asim; Mirza Mohammed Baig; Amir Farooq; Muhammad Jabir; Ikramullah Khan; Imal Liyanage (wk); Mujeeb-ur-Rehman; Mohammed Nadeem; Arumugaganesh Nagarajan; Himanshu Rathod; Muhammad Tanveer	Waji Ul Hassan (c); Abdul Manan Ali (vc, wk); Abdul Waheed; Ishtiaq Ahmad; Nawazish Akhtar (wk); Choudhry Md Imran; Usman Khalid; Faisal Khan; Zuhair Muhammad; Usman Najeeb; Ahmad Raza; Zuber Sunasara; Sidharth Sankar (wk); Zain Ul Abidin	Muhammad Waseem (c); Rahul Chopra; Syed Haider (wk); Muhammad Jawadullah; Simranjeet Kang; Nilansh Keswani; Asif Khan; Ali Naseer; Dhruv Parashar; Omid Shafi Rahman; Alishan Sharafu; Junaid Siddique; Tanish Suri (wk); Zuhaib Zubair

== Round-robin ==
=== Points table ===
Pos	Team	Pld	W	L	T	NR	Pts	NRR	Qualification
1	United Arab Emirates	5	4	1	0	0	8	0.763	Advanced to the final
2	Kuwait	5	3	2	0	0	6	0.525	Advanced to the final
3	Saudi Arabia	5	3	2	0	0	6	−0.166	
4	Oman	5	2	3	0	0	4	−0.019	
5	Bahrain	5	2	3	0	0	4	−0.098	
6	Qatar	5	1	4	0	0	2	−1.039	

Source: ESPNcricinfo

=== Fixtures ===
13 December 2024
09:00
Scorecard

Bahrain; 113/8 (20 overs)	v	United Arab Emirates; 117/2 (16.5 overs)
Ahmer Bin Nasir 58 (42); Ali Naseer 2/9 (4 overs)		Muhammad Waseem 50* (37); Imran Anwar 1/17 (3 overs)

United Arab Emirates won by 8 wickets
ICC Academy Ground, Dubai
Umpires: Gopakumar Pillai (Oma) and Zahid Usman (Kuw)
Player of the match: Muhammad Waseem (UAE)

- Bahrain won the toss and elected to bat.

13 December 2024
13:30
Scorecard

Saudi Arabia; 136 (19 overs)	v	Kuwait; 140/4 (16.5 overs)
Faisal Khan 49 (18); Mohammed Aslam 4/22 (4 overs)		Usman Patel 50* (35); Zain Ul Abidin 2/28 (4 overs)

Kuwait won by 6 wickets
ICC Academy Ground, Dubai
Umpires: Mohammad Nasim (Qat) and Shiju Sam (UAE)
Player of the match: Mohammed Aslam (Kuw)

- Kuwait won the toss and elected to field.
- Zuber Sunasara (Sau) made his T20I debut.

14 December 2024
09:00
Scorecard

Bahrain; 125/8 (20 overs)	v	Kuwait; 121 (19.3 overs)
Ahmer Bin Nasir 42 (38); Mirza Ahmed 2/15 (3 overs)		Meet Bhavsar 27 (32); Imran Anwar 3/27 (4 overs)

Bahrain won by 4 runs
ICC Academy Ground, Dubai
Umpires: Gopakumar Pillai (Oma) and Shiju Sam (UAE)
Player of the match: Imran Anwar (Bhr)

- Kuwait won the toss and elected to field.
- Sai Sarthak (Bah) made his T20I debut.

14 December 2024
13:30
Scorecard

Oman; 204/5 (20 overs)	v	Qatar; 169/8 (20 overs)
Jatinder Singh 69 (50); Mujeeb-ur-Rehman 1/13 (2 overs)		Muhammad Asim 63 (28); Aamir Kaleem 3/19 (4 overs)

Oman won by 35 runs
ICC Academy Ground, Dubai
Umpires: Rahat Ali (Sau) and Asim Mehmood (Bhr)
Player of the match: Jatinder Singh (Oma)

- Qatar won the toss and elected to field.
- Vinayak Shukla, Karan Sonavale (Oma), Muhammad Asim and Mujeeb-ur-Rehman (Qat) all made their T20I debuts.

15 December 2024
09:00
Scorecard

United Arab Emirates; 157/7 (20 overs)	v	Oman; 133/8 (20 overs)
Muhammad Waseem 48 (31); Samay Shrivastava 3/29 (4 overs)		Jatinder Singh 26 (24); Ali Naseer 2/23 (4 overs)

United Arab Emirates won by 24 runs
ICC Academy Ground, Dubai
Umpires: Rahat Ali (Sau) and Mohammad Nasim (Qat)
Player of the match: Muhammad Waseem (UAE)

- Oman won the toss and elected to field.

15 December 2024
13:30
Scorecard

Qatar; 123/9 (20 overs)	v	Saudi Arabia; 126/1 (16 overs)
Muhammad Asim 60* (47); Ishtiaq Ahmad 4/12 (4 overs)		Usman Khalid 75* (48); Mohammed Nadeem 1/26 (3 overs)

Saudi Arabia won by 9 wickets
ICC Academy Ground, Dubai
Umpires: Gopakumar Pillai (Oma) and Zahid Usman (Kuw)
Player of the match: Usman Khalid (Sau)

- Saudi Arabia won the toss and elected to field.
- Nawazish Akhtar and Choudhry Md Imran (Sau) both made their T20I debuts.

16 December 2024
09:00
Scorecard

Saudi Arabia; 113/9 (20 overs)	v	Bahrain; 119/2 (15.2 overs)
Waji Ul Hassan 35 (35); Imran Khan 3/20 (4 overs)		Haider Ali 52* (34); Usman Khalid 1/19 (1.2 overs)

Bahrain won by 8 wickets
ICC Academy Ground, Dubai
Umpires: Shiju Sam (UAE) and Zahid Usman (Kuw)
Player of the match: Haider Ali (Bhr)

- Bahrain won the toss and elected to field.

16 December 2024
13:30
Scorecard

United Arab Emirates; 168/8 (20 overs)	v	Kuwait; 157/8 (20 overs)
Tanish Suri 77 (47); Sayed Monib 3/33 (4 overs)		Mohammad Umar 59 (44); Muhammad Jawadullah 3/23 (4 overs)

United Arab Emirates won by 11 runs
ICC Academy Ground, Dubai
Umpires: Asim Mehmood (Bhr) and Mohammad Nasim (Qat)
Player of the match: Tanish Suri (UAE)

- United Arab Emirates won the toss and elected to bat.

17 December 2024
09:00
Scorecard

Qatar; 138/7 (20 overs)	v	Kuwait; 142/4 (16 overs)
Imal Liyanage 69 (56); Sayed Monib 3/22 (4 overs)		Clinto Anto 44 (29); Himanshu Rathod 2/23 (4 overs)

Kuwait won by 6 wickets
ICC Academy Ground, Dubai
Umpires: Asim Mehmood (Qat) and Shiju Sam (UAE)
Player of the match: Sayed Monib (Kuw)

- Kuwait won the toss and elected to field.

17 December 2024
13:30
Scorecard

Oman; 130/8 (20 overs)	v	Bahrain; 128/8 (20 overs)
Mohammad Nadeem 47 (49); Imran Khan 2/19 (4 overs)		Asif Ali 52 (44); Shakeel Ahmed 2/20 (4 overs)

Oman won by 2 runs
ICC Academy Ground, Dubai
Umpires: Rahat Ali (Sau) and Mohammad Nasim (Qat)
Player of the match: Mohammad Nadeem (Oma)

- Bahrain won the toss and elected to field.

18 December 2024
09:00
Scorecard

Oman; 165/6 (20 overs)	v	Saudi Arabia; 166/2 (18.5 overs)
Mohammad Nadeem 60 (49); Ishtiaq Ahmad 2/32 (4 overs)		Faisal Khan 70 (40); Mohammad Nadeem 1/17 (2 overs)

Saudi Arabia won by 8 wickets
ICC Academy Ground, Dubai
Umpires: Asim Mehmood (Qat) and Shiju Sam (UAE)
Player of the match: Faisal Khan (Sau)

- Saudi Arabia won the toss and elected to field.

18 December 2024
13:30
Scorecard

United Arab Emirates; 162/6 (20 overs)	v	Qatar; 139/7 (20 overs)
Muhammad Waseem 65 (36); Himanshu Rathod 3/27 (4 overs)		Muhammad Tanveer 47 (36); Simranjeet Kang 4/15 (4 overs)

United Arab Emirates won by 23 runs
ICC Academy Ground, Dubai
Umpires: Rahat Ali (Sau) and Zahid Usman (Kuw)
Player of the match: Simranjeet Kang (UAE)

- United Arab Emirates won the toss and elected to bat.

19 December 2024
13:30
Scorecard

Saudi Arabia; 182/8 (20 overs)	v	United Arab Emirates; 171/5 (20 overs)
Usman Khalid 57 (40); Ali Naseer 3/29 (4 overs)		Asif Khan 79 (53); Usman Najeeb 4/25 (4 overs)

Saudi Arabia won by 11 runs
ICC Academy Ground, Dubai
Umpires: Mohammad Nasim (Qat) and Gopakumar Pillai (Oma)
Player of the match: Usman Najeeb (Sau)

- United Arab Emirates won the toss and elected to field.

20 December 2024
09:00
Scorecard

Bahrain; 98 (16.3 overs)	v	Qatar; 102/4 (17 overs)
Haider Butt 27 (26); Muhammad Asim 2/1 (0.3 overs)		Muhammad Asim 36* (30); Sai Sarthak 3/9 (4 overs)

Qatar won by 6 wickets
ICC Academy Ground, Dubai
Umpires: Rahat Ali (Sau) and Zahid Usman (Kuw)
Player of the match: Muhammad Asim (Qat)

- Qatar won the toss and elected to field.
- Muhammed Basil (Bhr) made his T20I debut.

20 December 2024
13:30
Scorecard

Oman; 143/8 (20 overs)	v	Kuwait; 144/7 (19.3 overs)
Vinayak Shukla 52* (29); Adnan Idrees 2/13 (2 overs)		Meet Bhavsar 63 (46); Jay Odedra 2/15 (4 overs)

Kuwait won by 3 wickets
ICC Academy Ground, Dubai
Umpires: Asim Mehmood (Bhr) and Shiju Sam (UAE)
Player of the match: Meet Bhavsar (Kuw)

- Oman won the toss and elected to bat.

== Final ==
21 December 2024
18:30 (N)
Scorecard

United Arab Emirates; 153/9 (20 overs)	v	Kuwait; 151 (19.3 overs)
Tanish Suri 34 (32); Yasin Patel 3/30 (4 overs)		Meet Bhavsar 72 (54); Simranjeet Kang 2/17 (4 overs)

United Arab Emirates won by 2 runs
Dubai International Cricket Stadium, Dubai
Umpires: Rahat Ali (Sau) and Gopakumar Pillai (Oma)
Player of the match: Muhammad Jawadullah (UAE)

- United Arab Emirates won the toss and elected to bat.
