= Darius Visser =

Samoan cricketer (born 1995)

Personal information
- Born: 28 December 1995 (age 30); Auckland, New Zealand
- Batting: Right-handed
- Bowling: Legbreak
- Role: Batsman

International information
- National side: Samoa (2024–present)
- T20I debut (cap 33): 17 August 2024 v Fiji
- Last T20I: 18 May 2026 v Cook Islands
- T20I shirt no.: 33

Career statistics
Competition	T20I
Matches	11
Runs scored	531
Batting average	66.37
100s/50s	3/1
Top score	132
Balls bowled	168
Wickets	13
Bowling average	14.38
5 wickets in innings	0
10 wickets in match	0
Best bowling	4/11
Catches/stumpings	8/–
- Source: Cricinfo, 17 August 2025

Darius Visser (born 28 December 1995) is a Samoan cricketer and plays for the Samoa national cricket team in international cricket.

== Biography ==
Visser was born in Auckland, New Zealand, but moved to Sydney, Australia as a child. He is of mixed Samoan and Sri Lankan heritage. His mother is of Samoan heritage.

He initially plied his trade as a seam bowler, but persistent injury concerns cut short his bowling ability. He endured stress fractures more often in his early career, which forced him to switch to leg spin and also pushed him to concentrate more on his batting. He began his cricketing career at the Penrith Cricket Club, where he initially aspired to be a fast bowler. He went on to represent the University of Sydney and St George District in Sydney grade cricket. He also coaches and guides aspiring cricketers at the University of Sydney and Newington College.

== Career ==
He made his T20I debut for Samoa against Fiji at the 2024–25 ICC Men's T20 World Cup East Asia-Pacific Qualifier which was reserved as a curtain raiser in the qualification pathway for Oceanian nations in the lead up to the 2026 ICC Men's T20 World Cup.

On 20 August 2024, Visser shattered the world record for having scored the most number of runs in a single over of a men's T20I match when he smashed 39 runs, albeit three no balls being added to the record tally off the bowling of Nalin Nipiko during 2024–25 ICC Men's T20 World Cup East Asia-Pacific Qualifier match between Samoa and Vanuatu. Visser also hammered six sixes in the over becoming just the fourth male cricketer to hit six sixes in an over in T20Is after India's Yuvraj Singh, Kieron Pollard of West Indies and Nepal's Dipendra Singh Airee. The previous record for the most runs in a single over in T20I history were held jointly by India's Yuvraj Singh, Kieron Pollard and Nicholas Pooran of the West Indies and Nepal's Dipendra Singh Airee who all tied up with a tally of 36 runs in an over of a men's T20I match. He set the world record during the 15th over of the Samoan batting innings at the cusp of the beginning of the death overs. He also scored his maiden T20I century while batting at number four position during the match against Vanuatu and he eventually became the first player for Samoa to score a century in T20Is. He was dismissed for a score of 132 runs after facing 62 deliveries and he also set a new record for the highest percentage of runs scored by a batter in a team's innings as his knock was 75.86% of Samoa's scoreboard total. He also smashed 14 sixes during his whirlwind knock of 132 runs and it is also the fifth most number of sixes hit by a batsman in a T20I match and the most by a Samoan batter in a T20I match. He scored his maiden international century in only in his third T20I appearance and he also converted his maiden half century in T20I cricket to a century.

== See also ==
- List of Samoa Twenty20 International cricketers
