= Samoa national cricket team =

Samoa
- SICA logo
- Nickname: The 685
- Association: Samoa International Cricket Association

Personnel
- Captain: Sean Solia
- Coach: Christopher Coombe

International Cricket Council
- ICC status: Associate member (2017)
- ICC region: East Asia-Pacific
ICC Rankings	Current	Best-ever
T20I	54th	49th (12 May 2019)

International cricket
- First international: v Papua New Guinea at Colin Maiden Park, Auckland, New Zealand; 3 February 2001

T20 Internationals
- First T20I: v Papua New Guinea at Faleata Ovals, Apia; 8 July 2019
- Last T20I: v Cook Islands at Sano International Cricket Ground, Sano; 18 May 2026
T20Is	Played	Won/Lost
Total	37	11/26 (0 ties, 0 no result)
This year	6	4/2 (0 ties, 0 no results)
- T20 World Cup Qualifier appearances: 1 (Note: T20 World Cup Qualifier refers to the Regional Final of the ICC Asia/EAP region from the 2023 edition.) (first in 2025)
- Best result: 6th place (2025)
T20I kit
- As of 18 May 2026

The Samoa national cricket team is the men's team that represents Samoa in international cricket. They became an affiliate member of the International Cricket Council (ICC) in 2000. They competed in the Pacifica Championship in 2001 and 2002, hosting the tournament on the second occasion. They came 6th in 2001, and 5th in 2002. In 2005, they competed in the East Asia/Pacific Cup, finishing in last place, thus missing out on qualification for the 2011 World Cup. Since 2017, they have been an ICC associate member.

== History ==
In February 1966, Prime Minister Fiamē Mataʻafa Faumuina Mulinuʻu II banned cricket from being played except on Wednesdays and Saturdays, stating it was distracting Samoans from cleaning up after a cyclone. A cricket match in Samoa in October 1977 ended in a fight in which two players were stabbed to death. According to the Papua New Guinea Post-Courier, "the row started after a player was bowled out and angrily hit the wicket with his bat".

=== 2018–present ===
In April 2018, the ICC decided to grant full Twenty20 International (T20I) status to all its members. Therefore, all Twenty20 matches played between Samoa and other ICC members since 1 January 2019 have the full T20I status.

Samoa played their first T20I against Papua New Guinea during the 2019 Pacific Games, losing the rain-affected match by 9 wickets.

8 July 2019
09:30
Scorecard

Samoa; 83/5 (15 overs)	v	Papua New Guinea; 29/1 (3.1 overs)
Sean Cotter 25 (22); Chad Soper 2/15 (4 overs)		Tony Ura 14 (12); Lester Evile 1/0 (1 over)

Papua New Guinea won by 9 wickets (DLS method)
Faleata Oval 1, Apia
Umpires: Mac Markia (Van) and Mervyn McGoon (Fij)

- Papua New Guinea won the toss and elected to field.
- Papua New Guinea were set a revised target of 24 runs from 5 overs due to rain.
- First ever T20I match for Samoa with Twenty20 International status.

== Grounds ==
Locations of all stadiums which have hosted international cricket matches within Samoa

== Tournament history ==
=== T20 World Cup Asia-EAP Regional Final ===
T20 World Cup EAP/Asia–EAP Regional Final records
Host/Year	Round	Position	GP	W	L	T	NR
(Oman) 2025	Super 6	6/9	7	1	6	0	0
Total	1/4	0 Titles	7	1	6	0	0

- A – Advanced to Global Qualifier.
- Q – Qualified for T20 World Cup.

=== ICC EAP Cricket Trophy (ODI format) ===
ICC EAP Cricket Trophy records
Year	Round	Position	GP	W	L	T	NR
(Vanuatu) 2005	Round-robin	6/6	5	0	5	0	0
(Australia) 2006	Did not qualify						
(New Zealand) 2007	Round-robin	4/6	5	2	3	0	0
(Samoa) 2009	Round-robin	2/8	5	3	2	0	0
Total	3/4	0 Title	15	5	10	0	0

=== ICC EAP Cricket Trophy Division One (Twenty20 format) ===
ICC EAP Cricket Trophy records
Hots/Year	Round	Position	GP	W	L	T	NR
(Samoa) 2011	Round-robin	1/6	5	5	0	0	0
Total	1/1	1 Title	5	5	0	0	0

=== ICC EAP Cricket Trophy Division Two (Twenty20 format) ===
ICC EAP Cricket Trophy records
Hots/Year	Round	Position	GP	W	L	T	NR
(Papua New Guinea) 2011	Round-robin	3/4	4	2	2	0	0
Total	1/1	0 Title	4	2	0	0	0

=== Pacific Games ===
Cricket at the Pacific Games records
Hots/Year	Round	Position	GP	W	L	T	NR
(Fiji) 2003	Round-robin	3/6	5	3	2	0	0
(Samoa) 2007	Round-robin	3/5	4	2	2	0	0
(Samoa) 2019	Round-robin	3/4	7	4	3	0	0
Total	3/3	0 Title	16	9	7	0	0

== Records and statistics ==
International Match Summary — Samoa

Last updated 18 May 2026

Playing Record
Format	M	W	L	T	NR	Inaugural Match
Twenty20 Internationals	37	11	26	0	0	8 July 2019

=== Twenty20 International ===
- Highest team total: 188/2 v Malaysia, on 24 July 2025 at Singapore National Cricket Ground, Singapore.
- Highest individual score: 132, Darius Visser v Vanuatu, on 20 August 2024 at Feleata Oval 2, Apia.
- Best bowling figures in an innings: 4/11, Darius Visser v Fiji, on 17 August 2024 at Feleata Oval 2, Apia.

T20I record versus other nations

Records complete to T20I #3882. Last updated 18 May 2026.

Opponent	M	W	L	T	NR	First match	First win
vs Associate Members
Cook Islands	5	2	3	0	0	9 September 2022	9 September 2022
Fiji	6	2	4	0	0	11 September 2022	17 August 2024
Hong Kong	2	0	1	0	0	19 July 2025	
Indonesia	1	1	0	0	0	9 May 2026	9 May 2026
Japan	2	0	2	0	0	12 October 2025	
Malaysia	2	0	2	0	0	20 July 2025	
Nepal	1	0	1	0	0	17 October 2025	
Oman	1	0	1	0	0	8 October 2025	
Papua New Guinea	4	1	3	0	0	8 July 2019	9 October 2025
Philippines	1	1	0	0	0	10 May 2026	10 May 2026
Qatar	1	0	1	0	0	16 October 2025	
Singapore	2	0	2	0	0	18 July 2025	
United Arab Emirates	1	0	1	0	0	15 October 2025	
Vanuatu	8	4	4	0	0	9 July 2019	9 July 2019

=== Other records ===
For a list of selected international matches played by Samoa, see Cricket Archive.

== Notable players ==
- James Baker
- Dom Michael
- Faasao Mulivai
- Sean Solia
- Ofisa Tonu'u
- Darius Visser
- Ross Taylor

== See also ==
- Samoa women's national cricket team
- Samoa T20I cricketers
