= Samoa International Cricket Association =

Sports governing body in Samoa

Coordinates: 21.1335°S 175.2777°W

Cricket Samoa
- Sport: Cricket
- Affiliation: International Cricket Council
- Affiliation date: 2000 (as Affiliate Member); 2017 (as Associate Member)
- Regional affiliation: East Asia-Pacific
- Location: Apia, Samoa
- (Samoa)

The Samoa International Cricket Association (SICA) is the official governing body of the sport of cricket in Samoa. Cricket Samoa is Samoa's representative at the International Cricket Council and is an associate member and has been a member of that body since 2000. It is also a member of the East Asia-Pacific Cricket Council.

== Background ==
Cricket in the Samoan islands was introduced in 1884 by the visit of the British Royal Navy vessel HMS Diamond. Organised cricket in the islands began in 1964 when a band of locals and expats gathered as the Wanderers to play against passing cruise ships and other visitors. Ad hoc cricket fixtures and tournaments were the norm around Samoa until the late 1990s when an Association and committee was formed to take cricket to the next level.

=== ICC Affiliate ===
In 2000 the Samoa International Cricket Association (SICA) became an Affiliate member of the ICC. This affiliation provides annual funding support for SICA and also ensures that Samoa participates in regular ICC international fixtures and tournaments across the region and beyond. SICA has a strong partnership with Auckland Cricket, which provide professional assistance and training in all areas of cricket including coaching, umpiring and administration.

== Association structure ==
SICA has a dedicated administration which is run by an experienced committee and headed by local cricket legend and leading businessman, Seb Kohlhase. Kohlhase, who played first-class cricket in New Zealand and Australia, is well known in sporting circles in the region and his passion for cricket was one of the main reasons for his receiving an ICC award in 2006 for Lifetime Services to Cricket. The chairman of SICA is the Honourable Prime Minister Tuilaepa Lupesoliai Sailele Malielegoai. The Prime Minister's support of cricket has helped the sport maintain a high profile in Samoa and ensured that cricket continued to grow and develop. For the second year in a row, cricket will be played at Samoa's premier cultural carnival, the Teuila Festival, linking the sport with Samoan culture.

== Competitions ==
In September 2009 Samoa hosted the Pepsi ICC East-Asia Pacific Trophy. In May 2010 Samoa's National Women's team Nafanua competed in the East Asia Pacific Trophy held in Japan finishing third.

=== Teuila National Village Championships ===
The championships are held in September during Samoa's premier cultural carnival, the Teuila Festival. Over 30 teams compete for a ticket in the week long festival. In 2010 eight men's teams and six women's teams competed for the honor of being crowned the 2010 National Village Champions.

=== Senior Men's League ===
A two-tiered relegation based competition hosting 8–12 Senior Teams over a 20-week competition. A Senior Women's League is planned for 2011.

=== ANZAC Day Exhibition ===
In the tradition of ANZAC Day the exhibition match is battled out between Australian and New Zealand expats.

=== Independence Day Exhibition ===
The National Samoan Team matches up against the top international players on the island.

=== Business House Competition ===
Sixteen corporate organisations compete in a five-week competition.
