= 2001 Pacifica Cup (cricket) =

The Pacifica Cup was an international cricket tournament contested in 2001 and 2002 by teams from the Pacific Islands. The 2001 tournament was played in Auckland, New Zealand.

New Zealand Māori defeated the Fiji national team to win the tournament.

== Qualifying match ==
Eighth ranked vs Ninth ranked.

4 January 2001
Scorecard

Norfolk Island; 118 all out (21.5 overs)	v	Cook Islands; 122/3 (17.4 overs)
B Johnson 22; Eliaba 4/22 (6 overs)		T Kauvai 40; B.Cook 2/40 (7 overs)

Cook Islands won by 7 wickets
Auckland

== First round ==
The eight participating teams were divided into two pools of four teams for the first round.

=== Pool A ===
Fiji topped Pool A after winning all three of their matches, including a 362 run win against New Caledonia in their opening match. Tonga, who also beat New Caledonia by more than 300 runs, joined them in the semi-finals. Vanuatu finished third in the group ahead of the New Caledonians.

Team	Pts	Pld	W	T	L	NR
Fiji	6	3	3	0	0	0
Tonga	4	3	2	0	1	0
Vanuatu	2	3	1	0	2	0
New Caledonia	0	3	0	0	3	0

=== Pool B ===
Pool B was topped by the New Zealand Māori, with Papua New Guinea joining them in the semi-finals. The Cook Islands were third in the group, with Samoa at the bottom of the table.

Team	Pts	Pld	W	T	L	NR
Māori	6	3	3	0	0	0
Papua New Guinea	4	3	2	0	1	0
Cook Islands	2	3	1	0	2	0
Samoa	0	3	0	0	3	0

== Semi-finals ==
7 February 2001

Fiji; 166 all out (42.3 overs)	v	Papua New Guinea; 152 all out (40.4 overs)
Neil Maxwell 50 (71); Rarua Dikana 3/28 (10 overs)		Gima Keimolo 23 (30); Neil Maxwell 4/26 (10 overs)

Fiji won by 14 runs
Colin Maiden Park, Auckland
Umpires: Craig Allen, Wayne Knights

7 February 2001

Tonga; 159 all out (48.5 overs)	v	Māori; 160/5 (31.2 overs)
Maunaloa Faivakimoana 43 (78); David Little 3/27 (9 overs)		R. Bird 49 (33); Maunaloa Faivakimoana 3/42 (10 overs)

Māori won by 5 wickets
Colin Maiden Park No.2, Auckland
Umpires: Bruce Cates, Phil Jones

== Plate semi-finals ==
7 February 2001

Cook Islands; 301/9 (50 overs)	v	New Caledonia; 70 all out (21.1 overs)
Teanini Koroa 85 (107); Takai Kopila 2/19 (3 overs)		Takai Kopila 10 (27); Tunatu Kauvai 4/37 (10 overs)

Cook Islands won by 231 runs
Cornwall Park, Auckland
Umpires: Dave Lowe, Keith Rawlings

7 February 2001

Vanuatu; 97 all out (39.5 overs)	v	Samoa; 98/4 (35.5 overs)
Abraham Nasak 24 (35); Edward Annandale 4/29 (10 overs)		Iakopo Kuresa 27 (50); Tari Seru 1/14 (10 overs)

Samoa won by 5 wickets
Colin Maiden Park No. 3, Auckland
Umpires: Peter Gasston, Adrian Keown

== 7th place play-off ==
8 February 2001

New Caledonia; 97 all out (31.5 overs)	v	Vanuatu; 99/4 (12 overs)
Kalepo Folituu 17 (28); Richard Tatwin 3/17 (6 overs)		Richard Tatwin 66 (40); Nicky Passil 2/42 (6 overs)

Vanuatu won by 6 wickets
Keith Hay Park No. 1, Auckland
Umpires: Peter Gasston, Hiran Perera

== 5th place play-off ==
8 February 2001

Cook Islands; 137 all out (40.2 overs)	v	Samoa; 45 all out (20.1 overs)
Tunatu Kauvai 27 (66); Iakopo Kuresa 2/18 (9 overs)		Geoff Clarke 9 (30); Joseph Joe 4/6 (7 overs)

Cook Islands won by 92 runs
Colin Maiden Park No. 3, Auckland
Umpires: Dave Lowe, Keith Rawlings

== 3rd place play-off ==
8 February 2001

Tonga; 150 all out (37.5 overs)	v	Papua New Guinea; 151/8 (27.5 overs)
Sione Holi 62 (72); Ross Vagi 4/33 (8.5 overs)		Keimelo Vuivagi 30 (13); Kaufana Vasina 3/20 (6 overs)

Papua New Guinea won by 2 wickets
Colin Maiden Park No. 2, Auckland
Umpires: Bruce Cates, Wayne Knights

== Final ==
8 February 2001

Fiji; 164 all out (50 overs)	v	Māori; 165/7 (42.3 overs)
Tavo Sorovakatini 37 (68); G Waller 3/27 (8 overs)		Peter McGlashan 49* (121); Jone Seuvou 2/55

Māori won by 4 wickets
Colin Maiden Park, Auckland
Umpires: Craig Allen, Phil Jones

== Final standings ==
1. Māori
2. Fiji
3. Papua New Guinea
4. Tonga
5. Cook Islands
6. Samoa
7. Vanuatu
8. New Caledonia
9. Norfolk Island

== See also ==
- Cricket in Oceania
- World Cricket League EAP region
