= Cricket at the Pacific Games =

Optional sport

- Administrator: Pacific Games Council (PGC); International Cricket Council (ICC)
- Format: Men's Twenty20; Women's Twenty20
- First edition: M: 1979; W: 2015
- Latest edition: 2019
- Current champion: M: Papua New Guinea (7th title); W: Samoa (2nd title)
- Most successful: M: Papua New Guinea (7 titles); W: Samoa (2 titles)

Cricket is an optional sport at the quadrennial Pacific Games. It first appeared at the 1979 Games, with a men's tournament only seeing Papua New Guinea defeat New Hebrides (now Vanuatu) by 9 wickets in the final. Matches were played over 50 overs. The first women's tournament was held in 2015 in the Twenty20 format where Samoa won the inaugural women's title defeating Papua New Guinea in the final by 3 runs.

Since debutting in 1979, the sport was played intermittently at games in the 1980s and 1990s, depending on the facilities of the host nation. It was played continuously from 2003 to 2019, but was not included for the 2023 Pacific Games. Detailed records of the tournaments prior to 2003 have not been kept and little is known with certainty of the first three tournaments, beyond knowing what teams won the gold and silver medals at each Games.

== Men's tournament ==
=== Results ===
| Year | Host | Gold medal match | | | Bronze medal match | | | Number of nations | Ref |
| Year | Host | Gold | Result | Silver | Bronze | Result | Fourth place | Number of nations | Ref |
|---|---|---|---|---|---|---|---|---|---|
| 1979; Details | Suva, Fiji | Papua New Guinea | Papua New Guinea won by 9 wickets | New Hebrides | Fiji | | Tonga | 7 | |
| 1987; Details | Nouméa, New Caledonia | Papua New Guinea | | Fiji | Vanuatu | | New Caledonia | 4 | ^{c} |
| 1991; Details | Port Moresby, Papua New Guinea | Papua New Guinea | | Fiji | Tonga | | New Caledonia | 6 | ^{d} |
| 2003; Details | Suva, Fiji | Papua New Guinea | Papua New Guinea won by 2 runs Scorecard | Fiji | Cook Islands | Cook Islands won by 85 runs Scorecard | Samoa | 6 | |
| 2007; Details | Apia, Samoa | Papua New Guinea | Round-robin | Fiji | Samoa | Round-robin | Tonga | 5 | |
| 2011; Details | Nouméa, New Caledonia | Papua New Guinea | Round-robin | Fiji | Vanuatu | Round-robin | New Caledonia | 4 | |
| 2015; Details | Port Moresby, Papua New Guinea | Vanuatu | Vanuatu won by 4 wickets Scorecard | Papua New Guinea | Tonga | Tonga won by 7 wickets Scorecard | New Caledonia | 4 | |
| 2019; Details | Apia, Samoa | Papua New Guinea | Papua New Guinea won by 32 runs Scorecard | Vanuatu | Samoa | Samoa won by 157 runs Scorecard | New Caledonia | 4 | |

== Women's tournament ==
=== Results ===
| Year | Host | Gold medal match | | | Bronze medal match | | | Number of nations | Ref |
| Year | Host | Gold | Result | Silver | Bronze | Result | Fourth place | Number of nations | Ref |
|---|---|---|---|---|---|---|---|---|---|
| 2015; Details | Port Moresby, Papua New Guinea | Samoa | Samoa won by 3 runs Scorecard | Papua New Guinea | Fiji | Fiji won by 12 runs Scorecard | Vanuatu | 6 | |
| 2019; Details | Apia, Samoa | Samoa | Samoa won by 4 wickets Scorecard | Papua New Guinea | Vanuatu | Vanuatu won by 8 wickets Scorecard | Fiji | 4 | |

== Performance by team ==
Legend

- 1st – Gold
- 2nd – Silver
- 3rd – Bronze
- GS – Group stage
- Q – Qualified
- — Hosts

=== Men's tournament ===
| Team^{*} | Games | | | | | | | | Total |
| Team^{*} | (Fiji) 1979 | (New Caledonia) 1987 | (Papua New Guinea) 1991 | (Fiji) 2003 | (Samoa) 2007 | (New Caledonia) 2011 | (Papua New Guinea) 2015 | (Samoa) 2019 | Total |
|---|---|---|---|---|---|---|---|---|---|
| Cook Islands | — | — | — | 3rd | — | — | — | — | 1 |
| Fiji | 3rd | 2nd | 2nd | 2nd | 2nd | 2nd | — | — | 6 |
| New Caledonia | 6th | 4th | 4–6th | 6th | 5th | 4th | 4th | 4th | 8 |
| Papua New Guinea | 1st | 1st | 1st | 1st | 1st | 1st | 2nd | 1st | 8 |
| Samoa^{†} | 5th | — | — | 4th | 3rd | — | — | 3rd | 4 |
| Solomon Islands | — | — | 4–6th | — | — | — | — | — | 1 |
| Tonga | 4th | — | 3rd | — | 4th | — | 3rd | — | 3 |
| Tuvalu | 7th | — | — | — | — | — | — | — | 1 |
| Vanuatu^{†} | 2nd | 3rd | 4–6th | 5th | — | 3rd | 1st | 2nd | 7 |

=== Women's tournament ===
| Team^{*} | Games | | Total |
| Team^{*} | (Papua New Guinea) 2015 | (Samoa) 2019 | Total |
|---|---|---|---|
| Cook Islands | 5th | — | 1 |
| Fiji | 3rd | 4th | 2 |
| New Caledonia | 6th | — | 1 |
| Papua New Guinea | 2nd | 2nd | 2 |
| Samoa | 1st | 1st | 2 |
| Vanuatu | 4th | 3rd | 2 |

== Medal table ==
The all-time medal table for cricket at the Pacific Games, including the South Pacific Games, from 1979–present is collated in the table below.

All-time medal table
| Rank | Nation | Gold | Silver | Bronze | Total |
|---|---|---|---|---|---|
| 1 | Papua New Guinea | 7 | 3 | 0 | 10 |
| 2 | Samoa | 2 | 0 | 2 | 4 |
| 3 | Vanuatu | 1 | 2 | 3 | 6 |
| 4 | Fiji | 0 | 5 | 2 | 7 |
| 5 | Tonga | 0 | 0 | 2 | 2 |
| 6 | Cook Islands | 0 | 0 | 1 | 1 |
| Totals (6 entries) | | 10 | 10 | 10 | 30 |

== Pacific Mini Games ==
For the first time, Vanuatu included a men's cricket tournament in its successful bid for the 2017 Pacific Mini Games, to be held in Port Vila. The cricket facilities near Korman Stadium are planned to be renovated before the tournament. However, the effects of Cyclone Pam in 2015 have, according to some sources, cast doubt upon the country's ability to host the games.

== Records ==
As detailed results have not been kept for the first three tournaments, it is not possible to present detailed records. What is known is that Papua New Guinea's total of 572/7 against New Caledonia is the highest team total in any international one-day match, along with the winning margin of 510 runs, and therefore also in the South Pacific Games.

== See also ==
- Cricket in Oceania

== Notes ==
^* The number of teams at the tournaments has varied – there were seven teams in 1979, then four in 1987 and five in 1991. When the sport resumed at the 2003 games, six teams contested, but this number dropped to five in 2007 and four in 2011 and 2015 (for the men's tournament – the women's tournament had six teams).

^† Samoa and Vanuatu competed as Western Samoa and the New Hebrides, respectively, at the 1979 games.

^a 1979: Pacific Islands Monthly reported Papua New Guinea defeating New Hebrides in the final to win gold, passing the required total of 53 with the loss of only one wicket. Fiji defeated Tonga in a much closer third place play-off to win bronze by two wickets, passing the formidable total set by Tonga of 183 for the loss of six wickets.

^b 1979: Roy Morgan's Encyclopedia of World Cricket indicates that Western Samoa finished fifth at the 1979 South Pacific Games. They played New Caledonia in the fifth place play-off so New Caledonia are assumed to have finished sixth. Tuvalu finished seventh.

^c 1987: Roy Morgan's Encyclopedia of World Cricket indicates that Papua New Guinea defeated Fiji in the final to decide the gold and silver medals. The other three teams taking part were New Caledonia, the Solomon Islands and Vanuatu. The same book indicates that New Caledonia have never won an international match, so they are assumed to have finished fifth with either the Solomon Islands or Vanuatu winning the bronze or finishing fourth.

^d 1991: Results presented here are based on sparse records. The official results from the SPG website list PNG, Fiji and Tonga as the gold, silver and bronze medalists, respectively. Roy Morgan's Encyclopedia of World Cricket indicates that Papua New Guinea defeated Fiji in the final to decide the gold and silver medals. However it did not mention Tonga, and noted only two other teams in the tournament, New Caledonia and Vanuatu. The same book indicates that New Caledonia have never won an international match, which might lend weight to the assumption that Vanuatu won the bronze medal. For this article, however, the official results are preferred.
