= Cricket in Oceania =

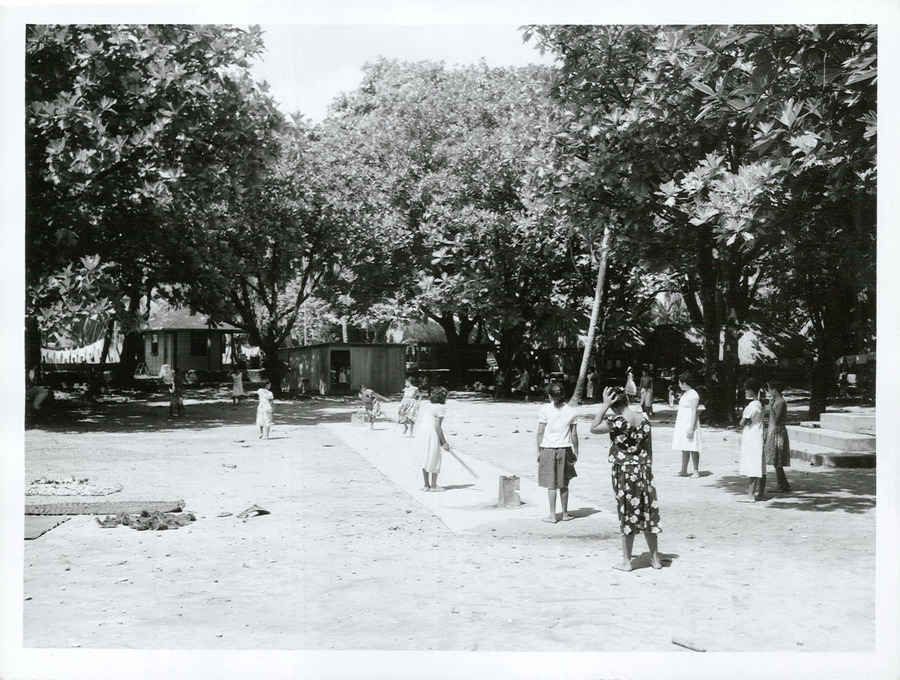
A women's cricket match in Fakaofo, Tokelau, in 1966.

The popularity of cricket in Oceania (Note: The definition of Oceania used in this article is a narrow one, excluding the two countries usually taken to comprise Australasia (Australia and New Zealand).) varies from place to place – in some countries, it is the national sport, while in others it is not played at all. A number of Oceanian countries are members of the International Cricket Council (ICC), and participate in tournaments organised by the ICC East Asia-Pacific (EAP) development program. The other major regional competition is the cricket tournament at the Pacific Games, which is open to ICC non-members.

== Map ==
ICC full members (AU, NZ) ICC associate members (FJ, MY, PG, US, VU) ICC affiliate members (CK, CN, ID, PH, WS) ICC former members (BN, AS, GU, KI, NC, NF, NR, NU, PI, SB, [, TW, WF) ICC non-members without a cricket presence (FM, MH, MP, PF, PW, TL, UM) Note: several countries on this map are not part of Oceania, indicated in square brackets.

== Cricket by country ==
=== American Samoa ===
American Samoa
Governing body	No
National team(s)	Unknown status
ICC membership	No

As in neighbouring Samoa (formerly Western Samoa), the most popular form of cricket in American Samoa, an unincorporated territory of the United States, is the traditional version known as kilikiti. The most significant event of the cricketing calendar is the annual tournament on Flag Day (the national holiday), which attracts large numbers of both men's and women's village teams. The prize money for the 2015 tournament totalled US$24,000. In June 2000, it was stated that a representative team from American Samoa was going to play the Samoan national team at newly renovated ground in Apia, although it is unclear if the fixture went ahead. It was also suggested that American Samoa might participate in the cricket event at the 2003 South Pacific Games in Fiji, but that did not eventuate.

=== Cook Islands ===
Cook Islands
Governing body	Yes – Cook Islands Cricket Association
National team(s)	Yes (men, women)
ICC membership	Yes – Associate

Organised cricket in the Cook Islands, an associated state of New Zealand, dates from at least 1910, when a cricket club was founded on Rarotonga. The game quickly spread to the outer atolls of Aitutaki and Mangaia, but in the 1950s entered into decline, with only six to eight clubs remaining in Rarotonga. A revival occurred in the 1990s, and the national governing body, the Cook Islands Cricket Association (CICA), became an affiliate member of the ICC in 2000. Outside of Rarotonga, cricket is most popular on Pukapuka, which lies closer to Samoa than to the rest of the islands.

The Cook Islands national team made its international debut in 2001, against Norfolk Island, and has since participated in ICC East Asia-Pacific regional tournaments and the Pacific Games. The national women's team debuted in 2012. Unlike in many other Pacific countries, women's cricket was only popularised in the country in the late 2000s. Participation has increased rapidly since then, and the CICA has won an ICC development award for its work in promoting the game amongst women. CICA has cultivated relationships with New Zealand domestic teams, initially with Auckland Cricket and later with the Northern Districts Cricket Association.

=== Fiji ===
Fiji
Governing body	Yes – Cricket Fiji
National team(s)	Yes (men, women)
ICC membership	Yes – Associate

Cricket was introduced to the Fijian Islands in 1874, during the time of the short-lived Kingdom of Fiji, when a team from Levuka played against a visiting Royal Navy ship. Fiji toured New Zealand in early 1895, they had only been playing first-class cricket for 21 years. Fiji's first international match was against the West Indies in 1956. In an historic landmark, Fiji's U-19 team participated in 2016 Under-19 Cricket World Cup.

=== Guam ===
Guam
Governing body	Unofficial – Guam Cricket Club
National team(s)	No
ICC membership	No

Cricket is popular among Indian expatriates in Guam, an unincorporated U.S. territory. The Guam Cricket Club was founded in 1992, and in 2010 had "about 25 members". Matches are played at Ypao Beach Field and on the University of Guam's playing fields. Plans to field a national team have been hampered by the lack of a dedicated ground and the frequent movement of players in and out of the country.

=== Kiribati ===
Kiribati
Governing body	No
National team(s)	Last active 1990s
ICC membership	No

Arthur Grimble, a future Resident Commissioner of the Gilbert and Ellice Islands colony, recounted in his memoir, A Pattern of Islands, that cricket was "going strong" on Ocean Island (now Banaba) at the time of his arrival in 1914. Ten years later, according to Grimble, it was "popular everywhere" in the islands, although it subsequently declined. Cricket was still regularly played on Ocean Island in the 1950s, where there were two main teams – one featuring mainly Australians and New Zealanders employed by the British Phosphate Commission, and the other featuring members of the local police force, who were predominantly indigenous Gilbertese. The pitch on the island's sports ground was made from coconut matting ground, with the outfield was covered in pieces of coral. According to the 1997 Wisden Cricketers' Almanack, a Kiribati representative team had toured Tuvalu in a fixture earlier in the 1990s, winning the match after their last batsman hit a six off the final ball.

=== Nauru ===
Nauru
Governing body	No
National team(s)	No
ICC membership	No

There are a number of photographs of formal cricket matches being played on Nauru in the early 20th century. One of these, dating from 1908 (during the period of the German protectorate), depicts Europeans and Nauruans playing together on a pitch surrounded by palm trees (watched on from a makeshift pavilion), and is titled "1st Match at Nauru". During the time of the British Phosphate Commission, cricket was cited by Australian newspapers as a key part of social life in the island. More recently, cricket has been popular (especially among Sri Lankans) in the Australian immigration detention centre on Nauru.

=== New Caledonia ===
New Caledonia
Governing body	Yes – New Caledonia Cricket Association
National team(s)	Yes (men, women)
ICC membership	No

Cricket was introduced to New Caledonia by English missionaries. It is currently mostly played by women.However, there are plans to become an ICC member soon.

=== Norfolk Island ===
Norfolk Island
Governing body	Unknown status
National team(s)	Last active 2014
ICC membership	No

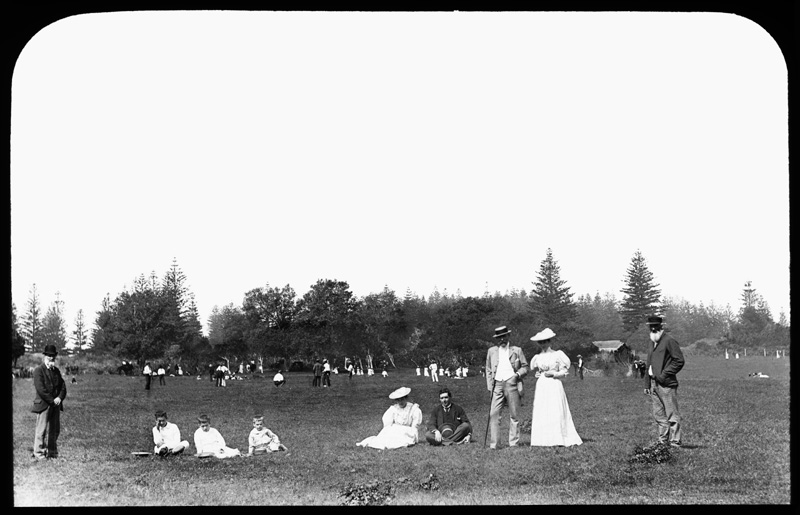
Spectators congregating at a cricket match on Norfolk Island in November 1908.

Cricket is recorded as having been played on Norfolk Island, an external territory of Australia, as early as 1838, by soldiers stationed on the island. It continued to be played after the island was settled in 1856 by Pitcairn Islanders, descended from the mutineers of the Bounty and of mixed European and Polynesian stock. John Patteson, an ex-first-class cricketer and future Bishop of Melanesia, was a missionary on Norfolk during that period. From 1876 until well into the 20th century, a match was played annually on Bounty Day, the national holiday, a tradition that was resumed in 1997. In 2001, it was reported that there were three clubs on the island (playing both a knockout tournament and a regular league), regular tours from the Australian mainland, and a junior development program, assisted by the New South Wales Cricket Association (NSWCA). Norfolk Island's cricket ground is located at Kingston Oval (or Kingston Common), with an artificial matting pitch overlooked by Kingston's convict-era buildings, which are World Heritage Sites.

A Norfolk Island representative team toured Auckland, New Zealand, in January 2001, and played at least two matches – one against an Auckland Secondary Schools team, and then a 50-over fixture against the Cook Islands, which it lost by seven wickets. Those matches are the only ones recorded for an island representative team. Excluded from the Pacifica Cup, which was played in 2001 and 2002, the Norfolk Island Cricket Association had expressed its intention to enter a team into the cricket tournament at the 2003 South Pacific Games, but this, along with its desire for affiliate membership of the ICC, did not eventuate. Their last tour was to the Pitcairn Islands in 2014.

=== Niue ===
Niue
Governing body	Unknown status
National team(s)	No
ICC membership	No

A 2011 Radio New Zealand article made reference to a Niue Cricket Association, and mentioned that a league had recently been established featuring ten village teams. The Niuean language, where the sport is known as kilikiki, contains a rich vocabulary of cricket-related terms. (Note: Examples from the Niue Language Dictionary include: ikitau – team manager; faimoa – to score a duck; paki – to cheer; goi – to stump; punipuni – to block; mate olo – to be out bowled; olo – wickets; teka – to bowl; tulipolo – to field; uka – draw; pamu – full toss; kutikuti – scorer)

=== Papua New Guinea ===
Papua New Guinea
Governing body	Yes – Cricket PNG
National team(s)	Yes (men, women)
ICC membership	Yes – Associate

=== Pitcairn Island ===
Pitcairn Islands
Governing body	No
National team(s)	Last active 2014
ICC membership	No

Cricket was introduced to Pitcairn Island (a British overseas territory) in the 19th century, by islanders who had learned the game on Norfolk Island. The sport was once played regularly, but is now played less often, in part due to an ageing population. A 1957 National Geographic profile of the island noted that women-only matches were played, and featured a photograph of a game in progress on a matting pitch, with palm trees marking the boundary. As of 2015, there is an annual match on the Queen's Official Birthday, in which most of the island participates. The previous year had seen a tour by a team of Norfolk Islanders. Owing to a lack of level ground on the island, a matting pitch is still used, placed on the lawn in front of the island's school. In the past, bulldozers were used to clear a suitable ground.

=== Samoa ===
Samoa
Governing body	Yes – Samoa International Cricket Association
National team(s)	Yes (men, women)
ICC membership	Yes – Associate

=== Solomon Islands ===
Solomon Islands
Governing body	Yes – Solomon Islands Cricket Association
National team(s)	Last active 1999
ICC membership	No

Cricket was introduced to the Solomon Islands archipelago in the late 19th century, by islanders who had learnt the game at school on Norfolk Island. Unlike in other parts of Melanesia, there was no prior history of ball games in the islands. Plum Warner's 1912 collection, Imperial Cricket, contained a description of cricket in the Solomon Islands by Cecil Wilson, the Bishop of Melanesia. He praised the islanders' skills, especially their bowling and throwing, but noted that there were difficulties in obtaining equipment and finding room to play.

By the 1960s, interest in the sport had waned outside of the capital, Honiara. The Solomon Islands national side made its debut in 1977, drawing a match against the touring Fijian national team. The team participated in the cricket tournament at the 1991 South Pacific Games in Papua New Guinea, and won at least one match (against New Caledonia). Cricket has since further declined in the country, with the national team last playing in 1999 (against an Australian club side). A national governing body, the Solomon Islands Cricket Association, was formed in 2000, at which point there were estimated to be only 18–20 indigenous players remaining (with the rest being expatriates from cricket-playing countries). A four-team league was established in Honiara in 2009, with support from AusAID (the Australian government's overseas aid program) . A writer in the 2015 Wisden Cricketers' Almanack, suggested that "cricket now teeters precariously" in the country. Solomon Islands is the only independent country in Melanesia that is not an ICC member. (Note: Fiji, Papua New Guinea, and Vanuatu are all associate members of the ICC. However, New Caledonia, a special collectivity of France, is not an ICC member.)

=== Tokelau ===
Tokelau
Governing body	No
National team(s)	No
ICC membership	No

In Tokelau, a territory of New Zealand, kilikiti is the only form of cricket played, and has been cited as the "favourite community sport". The sport is played on all three of Tokelau's atolls, Atafu, Fakaofo, and Nukunonu. Although the sport was introduced to Nukunonu first, in the 1890s, the local pitch was created only in the 1960s, by filling in a saltwater lagoon with baskets of coral gravel. Atafu and Fakaofo both have concrete pitches, and "Test matches" between the two atolls date to 1931. In Atafu, men and women play separately, while in Fakaofo they play together, although underarm bowling is used for the women.

=== Tonga ===
Tonga
Governing body	Yes – Tonga Cricket Association
National team(s)	Yes (men)
ICC membership	No – removed 2014

=== Tuvalu ===
Tuvalu
Governing body	No
National team(s)	Last active 1990s
ICC membership	No

Cricket was first introduced to Tuvalu (formerly the Ellice Islands) by Christian missionaries during the 1890s, although individual islands were not exposed until much later – for example, Vaitupu was only introduced to the sport in the 1920s, when a New Zealander began teaching the sport at Motufoua Secondary School. The only form of the sport currently played is kilikiti. Football is more popular, in part due to a lack of space for cricket fields – in Funafuti, Tuvalu's capital and most populous atoll, one of the cricket venues is the runway at Funafuti International Airport. A Tuvaluan national side participated in the cricket tournament at the 1979 South Pacific Games in Fiji. However, it lost all three of its matches, against Papua New Guinea, Tonga, and Western Samoa. According to the 1997 Wisden Cricketers' Almanack, Tuvalu had hosted Kiribati in a fixture earlier in the 1990s, narrowly losing after the last Kiribati batsman hit a six off the final ball of the game.

=== Vanuatu ===
Vanuatu
Governing body	Yes – Vanuatu Cricket Association
National team(s)	Yes (men, women)
ICC membership	Yes – Associate

=== Wallis and Futuna ===
Wallis and Futuna
Governing body	Unknown status
National team(s)	No
ICC membership	No

As in New Caledonia, another French overseas territory in the South Pacific, the most popular variant of cricket in Wallis and Futuna is kilikiti (or le cricket traditionnel in French). At least two stamps have been issued (in 1998 and 2005) depicting kilikiti on the islands. In August 2001, it was reported that steps were being undertaken to popularise the standard form of the game, with equipment donated from New Caledonia. A governing body, the Wallis & Futuna Cricket Association, had been established with the intent of joining ICC East Asia-Pacific and participating in the cricket tournament at the 2003 South Pacific Games in Fiji. Neither of these goals were met.

== See also ==
- Cricket in Australia
- Cricket in Indonesia
- Cricket in New Zealand
- Cricket in Vanuatu
