= Pacifica Cup =

International cricket tournament

The Pacifica Cup was an international cricket tournament contested in 2001 and 2002 by teams from the Pacific Islands.

== Champions ==
Year	Venue	Final			
Year	Venue	Winner	Runner-up	3rd Place	4th Place
2001	Auckland, New Zealand	Māori	Fiji	Papua New Guinea	Tonga
2002	Apia, Samoa	Papua New Guinea	Tonga	Fiji	Cook Islands

=== Participating nations ===
Nation	(New Zealand) 2001	(Samoa) 2002	Years
Cook Islands	5th	4th	2
Fiji	2nd	3rd	2
New Zealand Māori	1st	-	1
New Caledonia	8th	7th	1
Norfolk Island	9th	-	1
Papua New Guinea	3rd	1st	2
Samoa	6th	5th	2
Tonga	4th	2nd	1
Vanuatu	7th	6th	2

== 2001 tournament ==
The 2001 tournament was played in Auckland, New Zealand.

New Zealand Māori won from Fiji.

=== Qualifying match ===
Eighth ranked vs Ninth ranked.

4 January 2001
Scorecard

Norfolk Island; 118 all out (21.5 overs)	v	Cook Islands; 122/3 (17.4 overs)
B Johnson 22; Eliaba 4/22 (6 overs)		T Kauvai 40; B.Cook 2/40 (7 overs)

Cook Islands won by 7 wickets
Auckland

=== First round ===
The eight participating teams were divided into two pools of four teams for the first round.

==== Pool A ====
Fiji topped Pool A after winning all three of their matches, including a 362 run win against New Caledonia in their opening match. Tonga, who also beat New Caledonia by more than 300 runs, joined them in the semi-finals. Vanuatu finished third in the group ahead of the New Caledonians.

Team	Pts	Pld	W	T	L	NR
Fiji	6	3	3	0	0	0
Tonga	4	3	2	0	1	0
Vanuatu	2	3	1	0	2	0
New Caledonia	0	3	0	0	3	0

==== Pool B ====
Pool B was topped by the New Zealand Māori, with Papua New Guinea joining them in the semi-finals. The Cook Islands were third in the group, with Samoa at the bottom of the table.

Team	Pts	Pld	W	T	L	NR
Māori	6	3	3	0	0	0
Papua New Guinea	4	3	2	0	1	0
Cook Islands	2	3	1	0	2	0
Samoa	0	3	0	0	3	0

=== Semi-finals ===
7 February 2001

Fiji; 166 all out (42.3 overs)	v	Papua New Guinea; 152 all out (40.4 overs)
Neil Maxwell 50 (71); Rarua Dikana 3/28 (10 overs)		Gima Keimolo 23 (30); Neil Maxwell 4/26 (10 overs)

Fiji won by 14 runs
Colin Maiden Park, Auckland
Umpires: Craig Allen, Wayne Knights

7 February 2001

Tonga; 159 all out (48.5 overs)	v	Māori; 160/5 (31.2 overs)
Maunaloa Faivakimoana 43 (78); David Little 3/27 (9 overs)		R. Bird 49 (33); Maunaloa Faivakimoana 3/42 (10 overs)

Māori won by 5 wickets
Colin Maiden Park No.2, Auckland
Umpires: Bruce Cates, Phil Jones

=== Plate semi-finals ===
7 February 2001

Cook Islands; 301/9 (50 overs)	v	New Caledonia; 70 all out (21.1 overs)
Teanini Koroa 85 (107); Takai Kopila 2/19 (3 overs)		Takai Kopila 10 (27); Tunatu Kauvai 4/37 (10 overs)

Cook Islands won by 231 runs
Cornwall Park, Auckland
Umpires: Dave Lowe, Keith Rawlings

7 February 2001

Vanuatu; 97 all out (39.5 overs)	v	Samoa; 98/4 (35.5 overs)
Abraham Nasak 24 (35); Edward Annandale 4/29 (10 overs)		Iakopo Kuresa 27 (50); Tari Seru 1/14 (10 overs)

Samoa won by 5 wickets
Colin Maiden Park No. 3, Auckland
Umpires: Peter Gasston, Adrian Keown

=== 7th place play-off ===
8 February 2001

New Caledonia; 97 all out (31.5 overs)	v	Vanuatu; 99/4 (12 overs)
Kalepo Folituu 17 (28); Richard Tatwin 3/17 (6 overs)		Richard Tatwin 66 (40); Nicky Passil 2/42 (6 overs)

Vanuatu won by 6 wickets
Keith Hay Park No. 1, Auckland
Umpires: Peter Gasston, Hiran Perera

=== 5th place play-off ===
8 February 2001

Cook Islands; 137 all out (40.2 overs)	v	Samoa; 45 all out (20.1 overs)
Tunatu Kauvai 27 (66); Iakopo Kuresa 2/18 (9 overs)		Geoff Clarke 9 (30); Joseph Joe 4/6 (7 overs)

Cook Islands won by 92 runs
Colin Maiden Park No. 3, Auckland
Umpires: Dave Lowe, Keith Rawlings

=== 3rd place play-off ===
8 February 2001

Tonga; 150 all out (37.5 overs)	v	Papua New Guinea; 151/8 (27.5 overs)
Sione Holi 62 (72); Ross Vagi 4/33 (8.5 overs)		Keimelo Vuivagi 30 (13); Kaufana Vasina 3/20 (6 overs)

Papua New Guinea won by 2 wickets
Colin Maiden Park No. 2, Auckland
Umpires: Bruce Cates, Wayne Knights

=== Final ===
8 February 2001

Fiji; 164 all out (50 overs)	v	Māori; 165/7 (42.3 overs)
Tavo Sorovakatini 37 (68); G Waller 3/27 (8 overs)		Peter McGlashan 49* (121); Jone Seuvou 2/55

Māori won by 4 wickets
Colin Maiden Park, Auckland
Umpires: Craig Allen, Phil Jones

=== Final standings ===
1. Māori
2. Fiji
3. Papua New Guinea
4. Tonga
5. Cook Islands
6. Samoa
7. Vanuatu
8. New Caledonia
9. Norfolk Island

== 2002 tournament ==
The 2002 tournament was played in Apia, Samoa, with all games taking place on various grounds of the Faleata Oval. Seven teams took part in the tournament, with the New Zealand Māori team not taking part this year.

Papua New Guinea defeated Tonga in the final.

=== First round ===
The seven teams were split into two pools, with Fiji and Papua New Guinea alone in Pool A, whilst Pool B consisted of the other five teams.

==== Pool A ====
Pool A was reduced to what was essentially a three-match series between Papua New Guinea and Fiji. All three matches were won by Papua New Guinea, who thus qualified for the final.

Team	Pts	Pld	W	T	L	NR
Papua New Guinea	6	3	3	0	0	0
Fiji	0	3	0	0	3	0

==== Pool B ====
Pool B was topped by Tonga, who reached the final after winning all four of their matches. As in 2001, New Caledonia were at the foot of the pool, losing all four of their matches, including a 314 run defeat at the hands of group runners-up the Cook Islands.

Team	Pts	Pld	W	T	L	NR
Tonga	8	4	4	0	0	0
Cook Islands	6	4	3	0	1	0
Samoa	4	4	2	0	2	0
Vanuatu	2	4	1	0	3	0
New Caledonia	0	4	0	0	4	0

=== 5th place play-off ===
5 June 2002

Samoa; 223/9 (50 overs)	v	Vanuatu; 137 all out (38.2 overs)
Sipiliona Tua 87 (103); Pierre Chilla 4/31 (10 overs)		Richard Tatwin 25; Niko Apa 3/26 (7.2 overs)

Samoa won by 86 runs
Faleata Oval
Umpires: Tony Cooper, R Thoker

=== 3rd place play-off ===
5 June 2002

Fiji; 212 all out (49.5 overs)	v	Cook Islands; 55 all out (26.5 overs)
Iniasi Cakacaka 48 (104); Tuakana Marukore 3/24 (4.5 overs)		Tuakana Marukore 15; Taione Batina 4/17 (10 overs)

Fiji won by 157 runs
Faleata Oval
Umpires: F Griffin, Phil Jones

- Taione Batina took a hat-trick in the Cook Islands innings

=== Final ===
5 June 2002

Tonga; 89 all out (41.3 overs)	v	Papua New Guinea; 93/3 (16 overs)
Selusalema Vite 29; Noel Kariko 4/17 (8.3 overs)		John Ovia 23*; Selusalema Vite 2/31 (7 overs)

Papua New Guinea won by 7 wickets
Faleata Oval
Umpires: Billy Bowden, B Parry

=== Final standings ===
1. Papua New Guinea
2. Tonga
3. Fiji
4. Cook Islands
5. Samoa
6. Vanuatu
7. New Caledonia

== See also ==
- Cricket in Oceania
- World Cricket League EAP region
- 2023 Pacific Island Cricket Challenge
- Women's T20I Pacific Cup
