= Cricket at the 2015 Pacific Games – Men's tournament =

Men's cricket at the 2015 Pacific Games
- Dates: 14 – 18 July 2015
- Administrator: Pacific Games Council
- Cricket format: 20-over
- Tournament format(s): Double round-robin, playoffs
- Host: PNG
- Champions: Vanuatu (1st title)
- Participants: 4
- Matches: 15
- Most runs: (Papua New Guinea) Riley Hekure (386)
- Most wickets: (Vanuatu) Patrick Matautaava (15)

A men's 20-over cricket tournament at the 2015 Pacific Games in Port Moresby, Papua New Guinea, was held from 14 to 18 July 2015. Played at Amini Park and the Colts Cricket Ground, it was preceded by the women's tournament at the same venues the previous week.

Vanuatu were undefeated throughout the tournament, defeating Papua New Guinea in the final to win the gold medal for the first time (and become the first country other than PNG to win a gold medal in men's Pacific Games cricket). Tonga defeated New Caledonia in the bronze-medal play-off. Only four teams participated in the tournament, the same as at the 2011 tournament and two less than in the women's tournament. Because the 2015 World Twenty20 Qualifier was held at the same time, Papua New Guinea fielded a development squad at the Pacific Games, coached by John Ovia. Fiji and Samoa did not send men's teams, despite both their women's teams competing in the games. Cricket Fiji cited logistical reasons for not sending a team, stating their need to focus on their participation at the 2015 WCL Division Six tournament.

== Group stage ==
| Qualified for the final. |
| Qualified for the preliminary final. |

| Team | Pld | W | L | T | Pts | NRR |
|---|---|---|---|---|---|---|
| Vanuatu | 6 | 6 | 0 | 0 | 18 | +4.238 |
| Papua New Guinea | 6 | 4 | 2 | 0 | 12 | +4.485 |
| Tonga | 6 | 2 | 4 | 0 | 6 | –2.256 |
| New Caledonia | 6 | 0 | 6 | 0 | 0 | –6.607 |

14 July
Scorecard

| Vanuatu; 172/9 (20 overs) | v | Papua New Guinea; 144/6 (20 overs) |

Vanuatu won by 28 runs
Amini Park, Port Moresby

- Vanuatu won the toss and elected to bat.

14 July
Scorecard

| Tonga; 176 (19.4 overs) | v | New Caledonia; 139/6 (20 overs) |

Tonga won by 37 runs
Colts Cricket Ground, Port Moresby

- Tonga won the toss and elected to bat.

14 July
Scorecard

| Papua New Guinea; 259/3 (20 overs) | v | New Caledonia; 34 (9.4 overs) |

PNG won by 225 runs
Amini Park, Port Moresby

14 July
Scorecard

| Tonga; 55 (15.4 overs) | v | Vanuatu; 58/0 (3.1 overs) |

Vanuatu won by 10 wickets
Colts Cricket Ground, Port Moresby

- Vanuatu won the toss and elected to bowl.

15 July
Scorecard

| Vanuatu; 285/7 (20 overs) | v | New Caledonia; 51 (14.2 overs) |

Vanuatu won by 234 runs
Amini Park, Port Moresby

- Vanuatu won the toss and elected to bat.

15 July
Scorecard

| Papua New Guinea; 190/9 (20 overs) | v | Tonga; 76 (20 overs) |

PNG won by 114 runs
Colts Cricket Ground, Port Moresby

- PNG won the toss and elected to bat.

15 July
Scorecard

| Vanuatu; 115/9 (20 overs) | v | Papua New Guinea; 108/9 (20 overs) |

Vanuatu won by 7 runs
Amini Park, Port Moresby

- Vanuatu won the toss and elected to bat.

15 July
Scorecard

| Tonga; 222/3 (20 overs) | v | New Caledonia; 162 (19.3 overs) |

Tonga won by 60 runs
Colts Cricket Ground, Port Moresby

- Tonga won the toss and elected to bat.

17 July
Scorecard

| New Caledonia; 40 (15.3 overs) | v | Papua New Guinea; 41/0 (3.2 overs) |

PNG won by 10 wickets
Colts Cricket Ground, Port Moresby

- New Caledonia won the toss and elected to bat.

17 July
Scorecard

| Tonga; 108/8 (20 overs) | v | Vanuatu; 110/7 (16.3 overs) |

Vanuatu won by 3 wickets
Amini Park, Port Moresby

- Vanuatu won the toss and elected to bowl.

17 July
Scorecard

| Tonga; 83 (19.3 overs) | v | Papua New Guinea; 84/2 (10.2 overs) |

PNG won by 8 wickets
Amini Park, Port Moresby

- Tonga won the toss and elected to bat.

17 July
Scorecard

| Vanuatu; 195/9 (20 overs) | v | New Caledonia; 122/8 (20 overs) |

Vanuatu won by 73 runs
Colts Cricket Ground, Port Moresby

- Vanuatu won the toss and elected to bat.

== Finals ==
=== Preliminary final (2nd vs 3rd) ===
18 July
Scorecard

| Papua New Guinea; 176/5 (20 overs) | v | Tonga; 108/5 (20 overs) |

PNG won by 68 runs
Amini Park, Port Moresby

- PNG won the toss and elected to bat

=== Bronze-medal playoff ===
18 July
Scorecard

| New Caledonia; 163/8 (20 overs) | v | Tonga; 164/3 (19.2 overs) |

Tonga won by 7 wickets
Colts Cricket Ground, Port Moresby

- New Caledonia won the toss and elected to bat.

=== Final ===
18 July
Scorecard

| Papua New Guinea; 98 (19.3 overs) | v | Vanuatu; 101/6 (17.1 overs) |

Vanuatu won by 4 wickets
Amini Park, Port Moresby

- PNG won the toss and elected to bat.

== Statistics ==
=== Most runs ===
The top five runscorers are included in this table, ranked by runs scored and then by batting average.

| Player | Team | Runs | Inns | Avg | Highest | 100s | 50s |
|---|---|---|---|---|---|---|---|
| Riley Hekure | Papua New Guinea | 386 | 7 | 55.14 | 139 | 2 | 0 |
| Aloisio Pau'u | Tonga | 261 | 8 | 34.33 | 60 | 0 | 1 |
| Nalin Nipiko | Vanuatu | 219 | 6 | 36.50 | 105 | 1 | 0 |
| Jason Kila | Papua New Guinea | 187 | 7 | 31.17 | 74 | 0 | 1 |
| Chris Amini | Papua New Guinea | 177 | 5 | 35.40 | 80 | 0 | 2 |

Source: CricHQ

=== Most wickets ===
The top five wicket takers are listed in this table, ranked by wickets taken and then by bowling average.

| Player | Team | Overs | Wkts | Ave | SR | Econ | BBI |
|---|---|---|---|---|---|---|---|
| Patrick Matautaava | Vanuatu | 19.0 | 15 | 6.20 | 7.60 | 4.89 | 4/25 |
| Kabua Morea | Papua New Guinea | 24.0 | 12 | 10.67 | 12.00 | 5.33 | 4/20 |
| Jason Kila | Papua New Guinea | 17.3 | 10 | 8.60 | 10.50 | 4.91 | 3/7 |
| Alei Nao | Papua New Guinea | 23.0 | 10 | 9.20 | 13.80 | 4.00 | 4/0 |
| Nosaina Pokana | Papua New Guinea | 14.4 | 9 | 7.11 | 9.78 | 4.36 | 3/11 |

Source: CricHQ

== See also ==
- Cricket at the 2015 Pacific Games – Women's tournament
