= ICC EAP Cricket Trophy (One day) =

- Administrator: ICC East Asia-Pacific
- Format: Limited overs cricket
- First edition: 2005
- Tournament format: League system
- Number of teams: 8 (2009)
- Current champion: Papua New Guinea
- Most successful: Japan (2 titles)

The ICC EAP Cricket Trophy (One day) is the Limited overs cricket tournament of the ICC EAP Cricket Trophy in the ICC East Asia-Pacific region.

== Tournament History ==
=== 2005 ===
The first tournament that took place was the 2005 ICC EAP Cricket Cup. This was won by Japan, who defeated Cook Islands in the final. Both finalists gained a place in the next qualifying tournament, the 2006 ICC EAP Cricket Trophy.

Pos.	Team	Result
1	Japan	Qualify for 2006 ICC EAP Cricket Trophy
2	Cook Islands	Qualify for 2006 ICC EAP Cricket Trophy
3	Vanuatu	
4	Tonga	
5	Indonesia	
6	Samoa	

=== 2006 ===
The second competition, the 2006 ICC EAP Cricket Trophy saw the winners of the previous trophy play against Fiji to determine which team would qualify for 2007 ICC World Cricket League Division Three. The champion was Fiji who won the competition easily.

Pos.	Team	Result
1	Fiji	Qualify for 2007 WCL Division Three
2	Cook Islands	
3	Japan	

=== 2007 ===
The 2007 ICC EAP Cricket Trophy provided the opportunity for two teams from the East Asia-Pacific Region to qualify for the 2008 WCL Division Five. Japan won the tournament and progressed along with Vanuatu who finished second.

Pos.	Team	Result
1	Japan	Qualify for 2008 WCL Division Five
2	Vanuatu	Qualify for 2008 WCL Division Five
3	Cook Islands	
4	Samoa	
5	Tonga	
6	Indonesia	

=== 2009 ===
The 2009 EAP Trophy was held in Apia, Samoa from 17 to 25 September. The tournament was split into two parts, the first a Twenty20 competition and the second in the 50-over format. It was also the first time that Papua New Guinea participated in the competition. This part of the tournament was played from 19 to 25 September. In another new feature of the 2009 competition, the teams were split into two divisions based on whether they currently participated in the World Cricket League structure. This was mainly so that the Division Two would act as a qualifier for 2010 WCL Division Eight. Papua New Guinea won Division One while Vanuatu were the champions of Division Two and consequently qualified for the WCL.

Division One

Main article: 2009 ICC EAP Cricket Trophy Division One (One day)

Pos.	Team
1	Papua New Guinea
2	Fiji
3	Japan

Division Two

Main article: 2009 ICC EAP Cricket Trophy Division Two (List A)

Pos.	Team
1	Vanuatu
2	Samoa
3	Cook Islands
4	Tonga
5	Indonesia

== Tournament results ==
Year	Champions	Runners-Up	3rd Place	4th Place	5th Place
2005	Japan	Cook Islands	Vanuatu	Tonga	Indonesia
2006	Fiji	Cook Islands	Japan	N/A	N/A
2007	Japan	Vanuatu	Cook Islands	Samoa	Tonga

Year	Division I		Division II	
Year	Winner	Relegated	Winner	Last
2009	Papua New Guinea	None	Vanuatu	Indonesia
2011	TBC	TBC	TBC	TBC

== See also ==
- ICC EAP Cricket Trophy (Twenty20)
- Cricket World Cup
