= John Ovia =

Papua New Guinean cricketer (born 1976)

Personal information
- Full name: John Ovia
- Born: 16 July 1976 (age 50); Port Moresby, Papua New Guinea
- Batting: Right-handed
- Bowling: Right-arm off spin
- Role: Batsman

Career statistics
Competition	List A	ICC Trophy
Matches	7	17
Runs scored	114	340
Batting average	16.28	20.00
100s/50s	0/0	0/2
Top score	28	94
Balls bowled	48	197
Wickets	0	2
Bowling average	–	99.00
5 wickets in innings	–	0
10 wickets in match	–	0
Best bowling	–	2/31
Catches/stumpings	0/–	4/–
Medal record
Representing Papua New Guinea
Men's Cricket
South Pacific Games
Gold medal – first place	2003 Suva	50 over cricket
- Source: Cricket Archive, 14 October 2007

John Ovia (born 16 July 1976) is a Papua New Guinean cricketer. A right-handed batsman and right-arm off spin bowler, he has played for the Papua New Guinea national cricket team since the 1997 ICC Trophy. His wife Hebou Morea has played for the Papua New Guinea women's team.

== Career ==
Born on 16 July 1976 in Port Moresby, Papua New Guinea, Ovia first played for Papua New Guinea in the 1997 ICC Trophy. On his debut against Italy, he scored 94 runs and won the man of the match as Papua New Guinea won the match by 101 runs. He played in four more matches in the tournament, including the 13th place play-off against Singapore, which Papua New Guinea won. The following year, he played in the ACC Trophy against Singapore and Malaysia.

In 2001, he represented his country in the Pacifica Cup, taking 3/31 in the third place play-off against Tonga to secure the third place spot in the tournament. This was followed by his second ICC Trophy, the 2001 tournament in Canada. In 2002, he played in the second Pacifica Cup, top scoring in the final against Tonga to help Papua New Guinea win the tournament. The following year, he played in the cricket tournament at the 2003 South Pacific Games, top-scoring in the final against Fiji to pick up a gold medal. The following year, he represented a combined East Asia/Pacific team in the Australian national country championships, and has played in the tournament every year since.

In 2005, he played for Papua New Guinea at the repêchage tournament for the 2005 ICC Trophy. Papua New Guinea beat Fiji in the final, to qualify for the 2005 ICC Trophy in Ireland, where Ovia made his List A debut against the Netherlands.

In 2007, Ovia played for Papua New Guinea at Division Three of the World Cricket League in Darwin, Australia. He most recently played for them in the cricket tournament at the 2007 South Pacific Games, though he missed Papua New Guinea's record-breaking win over New Caledonia, picking up a second South Pacific Games gold medal.
