= Cricket in Vanuatu =

Cricket in Vanuatu is an established and growing sport. Vanuatu's playing season runs from April to October, during the Vanuatu winter to avoid the heat and humidity of the tropical summer. There are 10 cricket clubs in Vanuatu.

== History ==
The first reference of cricket being played in Vanuatu is 1905 through English settlers in what was then the New Hebrides, which Vanuatu was a part of. It became organised sometime after which matches involving the settlers and the native New Hebrideans from villages and the capital Port Vila were held for many decades prior to independence. During those decades the matches were played at a single ground. In the 1970s two grounds were built at a plantation half-way around the island of Efate and another at a country club 20 kilometres from Port Vila.

In 1995, Vanuatu were admitted to the International Cricket Council as an Affiliate member. Since then the game has grown in popularity, particularly among Ni-Vanuatuan's. Vanuatu's debut in international cricket came in the Pacific Championships against Tonga in 2001. Vanuatu hosted the 2005 ICC EAP Cricket Cup, in which they came third. They have since played in every other EAP Cricket Cup, except the 2008 competition which they did not enter. In 2008, Vanuatu made their debut in World Cricket League Division Five, emerging winless and relegated from the World Cricket League structure. In 2009 they became an Associate member of the International Cricket Council. Their next appearance in the World Cricket League came in the 2010 ICC World Cricket League Division Eight. Their third-place finish in this competition kept them in the same competition for 2012.

In April and May 2020, despite the COVID-19 pandemic, Vanuatu was largely unaffected by the virus, and the country became the first to resume playing cricket.

== Governing body ==
The Vanuatu Cricket Association is the official governing body of cricket in Vanuatu. Its current headquarters is in Port Vila. Vanuatu Cricket Association is Vanuatu representative at the International Cricket Council.

== Domestic competitions ==
The BDO Club Championship is the Vanuatu's premier round-robin competition with as many as 10 sides competing each season. The competition is based in Port Vila. Running alongside this competition is an annual Twenty20 knockout competition called the Independence Cup. The final of this competition is held July 30, the date that Vanuatu gained independence from Great Britain and France.

== Grounds ==
Along with the 2 grounds built in the 1970s, in the past 5 years 4 further grounds have been constructed to deal with an increased interest in the game in Vanuatu.

== National team ==
The Vanuatu national cricket team represents the country in international cricket matches. The national team, formed in 2001, play in the ICC EAP Cricket Cup and in the World Cricket League, in which it competes in Division Eight. The women's national team debuted in 2011.

== See also ==
- Cricket in Oceania
- Sport in Vanuatu
