= Rarua Dikana =

Papua New Guinean cricketer

Personal information
- Full name: Rarua Dikana Boge
- Born: 19 October 1978 (age 48); Papua New Guinea
- Nickname: Rugi Dee
- Batting: Right-handed
- Bowling: Right-arm medium
- Role: Bowler

International information
- National side: Papua New Guinea

Career statistics
Competition	List A
Matches	16
Runs scored	115
Batting average	9.58
100s/50s	–/–
Top score	27
Balls bowled	487
Wickets	16
Bowling average	21.62
5 wickets in innings	–
10 wickets in match	–
Best bowling	3/31
Catches/stumpings	4/–
- Source: CricketArchive, 22 May 2011

Rarua Dikana (born 19 October 1978 in Papua New Guinea) is a Papua New Guinean former cricketer, also known as Rarva Dikana. A right-handed batsman, right-arm medium pace bowler and occasional wicket-keeper, he has played for the Papua New Guinea national cricket team since 1998.

== Career ==
Dikana's first taste of international cricket came in the 1998 Under-19 World Cup when he represented Papua New Guinea Under-19s in six tournament matches. He made his debut for the senior side later that year, playing against Malaysia and Singapore in the ACC Trophy.

He next played for Papua New Guinea in the 2001 Pacifica Cup in Auckland, New Zealand before playing for them in the 2001 ICC Trophy in Canada. He played in the 2002 Pacifica Cup in Apia, Samoa, including the final in which Papua New Guinea beat Tonga. In 2004, he first represented a combined East Asia Pacific team in the Australian National Country Cricket Championships, and has represented the side every year since.

In 2005, he played in the repêchage tournament for the 2005 ICC Trophy. Papua New Guinea beat Fiji in the final, to qualify for the 2005 ICC Trophy in Ireland, where Dikana made his List A debut against the Netherlands.

He represented Papua New Guinea at Division Three of the World Cricket League in Darwin, Australia, where he captained the side, and in the cricket tournament at the 2007 South Pacific Games.

Dikana played for Papua New Guinea in the 2009 World Cricket League Division Three, where he played 6 matches. He appeared for Papua New Guinea in the 2011 World Cricket League Division Two. He played a further 6 List A matches in the competition, the last coming against Hong Kong. In his 6 matches in the competition, he took 10 wickets at a bowling average of 17.40, with best figures of 3/31.

== Coaching career ==
After retiring from playing, Dikana was appointed interim head coach of Papua New Guinea for the 2011 Pacific Games in Samoa. He also filled the role on an interim basis in 2014 following the resignation of Peter Anderson.
