= Cricket at the 2015 Pacific Games =

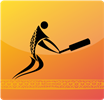
- Cricket pictogram for the Games
- Venue: Amini Park, Port Moresby
- Dates: 6–18 July
- Nations: 7

Cricket at the 2015 Pacific Games in Port Moresby, Papua New Guinea, was held from 6–18 July 2015. A women's tournament was held for the first time, and Samoa won the event to become the first country other than Papua New Guinea to win a gold medal in Pacific Games cricket. In the men's tournament (held the week after the women's event), Vanuatu won the gold medal. The shorter Twenty20 form of the game was used for both the men's and women's competitions.

== Medal summary ==
=== Medal table ===
Rank	Nation	Gold	Silver	Bronze	Total
1	Samoa (SAM)	1	0	0	1
1	Vanuatu (VAN)	1	0	0	1
3	Papua New Guinea (PNG)	0	2	0	2
4	Fiji (FIJ)	0	0	1	1
4	Tonga (TON)	0	0	1	1
Totals (5 entries)		2	2	2	6

=== Results ===
Event	Gold	Silver	Bronze
Men	Vanuatu	Papua New Guinea	Tonga
Women	Samoa	Papua New Guinea	Fiji

== Participating teams ==
Six women's teams and four men's teams played in the respective tournaments:

Women:

- Cook Islands
- Fiji
- New Caledonia
- Papua New Guinea
- Samoa
- Vanuatu

Men:

- New Caledonia
- Papua New Guinea
- Tonga
- Vanuatu

Because Papua New Guinea's men's team was competing at the 2015 World Twenty20 Qualifier at the same time, they were represented by an "A" team at the Pacific Games, captained by Chris Amini.

== Standings ==
=== Men ===
Rank	Team	Pld	W	T	L	NR
1st place, gold medalist(s)	Vanuatu	7	7	0	0	0
2nd place, silver medalist(s)	Papua New Guinea	8	5	0	3	0
3rd place, bronze medalist(s)	Tonga	8	3	0	5	0
4	New Caledonia	7	0	0	7	0

=== Women ===
Rank	Team	Pld	W	T	L	NR
1st place, gold medalist(s)	Samoa	7	6	0	1	0
2nd place, silver medalist(s)	Papua New Guinea	6	5	0	1	0
3rd place, bronze medalist(s)	Fiji	6	3	0	3	0
4	Vanuatu	7	3	0	4	0
5	Cook Islands	6	2	0	4	0
6	New Caledonia	6	0	0	6	0

== See also ==
- Cricket at the Pacific Games
