= New Zealand Māori cricket team =

New Zealand Māori
- Association: New Zealand Cricket

International Cricket Council
- ICC status: None
- ICC region: ICC East Asia-Pacific

International cricket
- First international: (Māori people) New Zealand Māori v. Cook Islands (Auckland, New Zealand; 3 February 2001)
- As of 20 January 2017

The New Zealand Māori cricket team is a team that represented the Māori community of New Zealand in the 2001 Pacifica Cup cricket tournament. Whilst their rugby union and rugby league counterparts play often, this is the only appearance to date of the cricket team.

== 2001 Pacifica Cup ==
The New Zealand Māori team took part in the first Pacifica Cup. They topped their first round group, winning all three of their matches against the Cook Islands, Papua New Guinea and Samoa. They then beat Tonga in the semi-finals before beating Fiji in the final to win the tournament. They did not compete in the 2002 tournament.

== 2024 Women's Pacific Cup ==
A women's team representing the New Zealand Māori played in the 2024 Pacific Cup in January 2024 in Auckland.

== Players ==
The following players played for the New Zealand Māori in the 2001 Pacifica Cup:

- Robert Bird
- Ben J. Cochrane
- Leigh Kelly (captain) - previously played first-class cricket for Wellington
- David Little - previously played first-class and List A cricket for Wellington
- Peter McGlashan - has since played international Twenty20 cricket for New Zealand
- Jonathan McNamee - previously played for New Zealand Under-19s
- Thomas Nukunuku
- Phillip T. Otto
- Jonathan Paine
- Jesse Ryder - has since played first-class and List A cricket for Central Districts and Wellington, Twenty20 cricket for Wellington, List A cricket as an overseas player for Ireland and is a middle order batsman in the Tests and opened the batting in One Day Internationals and Twenty20's for New Zealand
- Tane Topia - played one List A match for Auckland
- Ash Turner - has since played first-class and List A cricket for Wellington
- Gene Waller

== Other notable players of Māori heritage ==
=== NZ representatives: Men ===
- Trent Boult
- Shane Bond
- Doug Bracewell
- Daryl Tuffey
- Craig McMillan
- Heath Davis
- Adam Parore
- Kyle Mills
- Anaru Kitchen
- Ben Wheeler
- Tama Canning
- Katene Clarke

=== NZ representatives: Women ===
- Agnes Ell
- Hilda Buck
- Rona McKenzie
- Suzie Bates
- Sara McGlashan
- Lea Tahuhu
- Eden Carson

=== NZ domestic players ===
- Kieran Noema-Barnett
- Zak Gibson
- Rhys Mariu
- Ben Stokes

=== International players ===
- Ben Stokes

== See also ==
- New Zealand Māori rugby union team
- New Zealand Māori rugby league team
