= New Zealand Māori =

New Zealand Māori can refer to:

- Māori people
- Māori culture
- Māori language
- New Zealand Māori rugby union team
- New Zealand Māori rugby league team
- New Zealand Māori cricket team
