= Kabua Morea =

Papua New Guinean cricketer

Personal information
- Full name: Kabua Vagi Morea
- Born: 30 September 1993 (age 33)

International information
- National side: Papua New Guinea
- ODI debut (cap 26): 10 September 2021 v Nepal
- Last ODI: 28 February 2023 v United Arab Emirates
- T20I debut (cap 25): 8 October 2021 v Scotland
- Last T20I: 23 July 2023 v Philippines
Medal record
Representing Papua New Guinea
Men's Cricket
Pacific Games
Silver medal – second place	2015 Port Moresby	20 over cricket
- Source: Cricinfo, 23 July 2023

Kabua Morea (born 30 September 1993) is a Papua New Guinean cricketer. Morea was named in the Papua New Guinea (PNG) squads for the 2012 Under-19 Cricket World Cup and the 2014 Under-19 Cricket World Cup. He also represented PNG in the men's cricket tournament at the 2015 Pacific Games, finishing the tournament as PNG's leading wicket-taker with 12 dismissals.

In August 2021, he was named in PNG's One Day International (ODI) squad for their series against Nepal and the United States in Oman, and their squad for round seven of the 2019–2023 ICC Cricket World Cup League 2 tournament, also in Oman. He was part of the PNG squad for the 2021 ICC Men's T20 World Cup. He made his ODI debut on 10 September 2021, against Nepal. The following month, in round seven of the 2019–2023 ICC Cricket World Cup League 2 tournament, Morea took his first five-wicket haul in ODI cricket, with 5 for 28 against Oman. He made his Twenty20 International (T20I) debut on 8 October 2021 against Scotland in the 2021 Summer T20 Bash.

In May 2024, he was named in Papua New Guinea’s squad for the 2024 ICC Men's T20 World Cup tournament.
