= Swimming at the 1979 South Pacific Games =

- Location: Agana, Guam
- Dates: 1979

Swimming at the 1979 South Pacific Games took place in Suva, the capital of Fiji. It was the sixth edition of the South Pacific Games. The existing South Pacific Games record time was broken in every event.

There were either 24 or 23 events on the programme, depending on whether the men's 4 × 200 metres relay was contested and officially included in the medals. There are conflicting sources of information cited (as of November 2015) and none sufficient to provide clarity.^{a}

== Medal summary ==
=== Medal table ===
* Host nation (Fiji)

Rank	Nation	Gold	Silver	Bronze	Total
1	French Polynesia (PYF)	7	5	6	18
2	Guam (GUM)	6	5	6	17
3	New Caledonia (NCL)	5	9	6	20
4	Papua New Guinea (PNG)	3	4	3	10
5	Fiji (FIJ)*	2	0	2	4
Totals (5 entries)		23	23	23	69

==== Men's events ====
Event	Gold		Silver		Bronze	
100 m Freestyle	Hollis Kimbrough (GUM)	56.88 ^{ GR }	Henri Noble (TAH)	57.07	Gil Verlaguet (NCL)	58.47
200 m Freestyle	Hollis Kimbrough (GUM)	2:01.43 ^{ GR }	Henri Noble (TAH)	2:01.45	Gil Verlaguet (NCL)	2:04.19
400 m Freestyle	Hollis Kimbrough (GUM)	4:20.25 ^{ GR }	Gil Verlaguet (NCL)	4:20.50	Henri Noble (TAH)	4:22.70
1500 m Freestyle	Gil Verlaguet (NCL)	17:06.91 ^{ GR }	Hollis Kimbrough (GUM)	17:45.39	Henri Noble (TAH)	17:56.62
100 m Backstroke	Henri Noble (TAH)	1:02.62 ^{ GR }	David Zimmerman (GUM)	1:06.25	Gordon Petersen (FIJ)	1:08.16
100 m Breaststroke	Ronald Bonnet (TAH)	1:12.53 ^{ GR }	Jean-Christophe Mouren (NCL)	1:15.34	Geoff Burke (GUM)	1:16.00
200 m Breaststroke	Ronald Bonnet (TAH)	2:41.83 ^{ GR }	Jean-Christophe Mouren (NCL)	2:45.69	David Murphy (PNG)	2:45.79
100 m Butterfly	Henri Noble (TAH)	1:03.20 ^{ GR }	Daniel Berdichewsky (TAH)	1:03.97	Eri Anderson (GUM)	1:04.58
200 m Individual medley	Henri Noble (TAH)	2:19.98 ^{ GR }	David Zimmerman (GUM)	2:24.82	Jean-Christophe Mouren (NCL)	2:25.74
4 × 100 m Freestyle relay	French Polynesia	3:53.88 ^{ GR }	Guam	3:56.20	New Caledonia	3:58.71
4 × 200m Freestyle relay^{a} (no results)	–	–	–	–	–	–
4 × 100 m Medley relay	French Polynesia	4:17.35 ^{ GR }	Guam	4:25.88	Fiji	4:42.08

==== Women's events ====
Event	Gold		Silver		Bronze	
100 m Freestyle	Lydia Lambert (GUM)	1:04.27 ^{ GR }	Patricia Legras (NCL)	1:04.46	Heather Hagadron (GUM)	1:05.39
200 m Freestyle	Patricia Legras (NCL)	2:16.19 ^{ GR }	Yolaine Saminadin (NCL)	2:18.12	Elizabeth Zenone (TAH)	2:20.40
400 m Freestyle	Patricia Legras (NCL)	4:41.23 ^{ GR }	Yolaine Saminadin (NCL)	4:41.74	Cathy Zenone (TAH)	4:52.04
800 m Freestyle	Patricia Legras (NCL)	9:38.58 ^{ GR }	Yolaine Saminadin (NCL)	9:47.77	Cathy Zenone (TAH)	10:04.41
100 m Backstroke	Carolyn Dalby (PNG)	1:11.10 ^{ GR }	Trudy Chang (PNG)	1:14.33	Dawn Edwards (PNG)	1:14.34
100 m Breaststroke	Justine Macaskill (FIJ)	1:22.75 ^{ GR }	Mini Eria (TAH)	1:24.08	Patricia Legras (NCL)	1:24.19
200 m Breaststroke	Justine Macaskill (FIJ)	2:58.91 ^{ GR }	Patricia Legras (NCL)	2:59.72	Cathy Ysrael (GUM)	3:00.15
100 m Butterfly	Trudy Chang (PNG)	1:11.16 ^{ GR }	Carolyn Dalby (PNG)	1:11.88	Elizabeth Ysrael (GUM)	1:12.71
200 m Individual medley	Trudy Chang (PNG)	2:36.78 ^{ GR }	Patricia Legras (NCL)	2:39.66	Vaoa Verave (PNG)	2:40.09
4 × 100 m Freestyle relay	Guam	4:20.60 ^{ GR }	Papua New Guinea	4:23.98	French Polynesia	4:26.49
4 × 200m Freestyle relay	Guam	9:29.36 ^{ GR }	French Polynesia	9:31.98	New Caledonia	9:32.76
4 × 100 m Medley relay	New Caledonia	5:02.34 ^{ GR }	Papua New Guinea	5:02.65	Guam	5:03.12

== Notes ==
^{GR} denotes South Pacific Games record time.

^a The men's 4 × 200 metres freestyle relay, as marked up with a (grey background) in the events table above, was not listed in the results published in the November 1979 issue of Pacific Islands Monthly (PIM). As such, and unless other source material for the 1979 results become available, no medals for this event are included in the tally on this page. However, there are sources which suggest that the PIM published results might have some inaccuracies and could be incomplete:

1. The same PIM issue, two pages earlier, reports that Fiji won table tennis gold medals for both the women's team event and the women's doubles. However, only the women's doubles event is recorded in the list of results, and no women's (or men's) team event for table tennis is included.
2. Also earlier in the same PIM issue, it is reported that "Papua New Guinea took the bronze" in the netball competition, behind Fiji and Cook Islands. However, in the PIM results for the netball, Tonga is listed as finishing in third place.
3. A publication from Guam's Political Status Education Coordinating Commission also states that the Guam swimmer Hollis Kimbrough, "won a record seven medals in the '79 SPG alone". As the PIM results show only four medals for Kimbrough plus two men's relay medals won by the Guam team, it may be the case that the men's 4 × 200 m event did take place but was missed in the results.

== Sources ==
- "Last of the Super Games/The Medal Winners" (PDF). Pacific Islands Monthly. 50 (10). 1979. Archived from the original on July 4, 2016.
