= John Gosling (cricketer, born 1921) =

Fijian cricketer

Personal information
- Full name: John William Gosling
- Born: 1921; Suva, Fiji
- Died: 1994 (aged 72–73)
- Bowling: Right-arm medium pace
- Role: Bowler

Domestic team information
- Years: Team
- 1948: Fiji
- First-class debut: 5 March 1948 Fiji v Canterbury

Career statistics
| Competition | First-class |
|---|---|
| Matches | 1 |
| Runs scored | 5 |
| Batting average | 2.50 |
| 100s/50s | 0/0 |
| Top score | 5 |
| Balls bowled | 234 |
| Wickets | 2 |
| Bowling average | 58.50 |
| 5 wickets in innings | 0 |
| 10 wickets in match | 0 |
| Best bowling | 1/55 |
| Catches/stumpings | 0/0 |
- Source: CricketArchive, 13 October 2007

John William Gosling (1921 – 1994 ) was a Fijian cricketer. A right arm medium pace bowler, he played one first-class match for the Fiji national cricket team, against Canterbury in March 1948. Eight years later, he was a key part of the Fijian team that gained an upset 28 run win over the Test-playing West Indians, taking six wickets, including that of Garfield Sobers.
