= Nat Uluiviti =

Nacanieli Uluiviti
Personal information
- Full name: Nacanieli Mataika Uluiviti
- Born: 19 May 1932; Suva, Fiji
- Died: 6 May 2004 (aged 71); Suva, Fiji
- Batting: Right-handed
- Bowling: Right-arm medium

Domestic team information
- Years: Team
- 1954: Fiji
- 1954/55: Auckland
- FC debut: 12 February 1954 Fiji v Otago
- Last FC: 21 January 1955 Auckland v Central Districts

Career statistics
Competition	First-class
Matches	8
Runs scored	210
Batting average	16.15
100s/50s	0/0
Top score	48*
Balls bowled	372
Wickets	3
Bowling average	61.00
5 wickets in innings	0
10 wickets in match	0
Best bowling	1/18
Catches/stumpings	11/–
- Source: Cricket Archive, 14 October 2007

Nacanieli Mataika "Nat" Uluiviti (19 May 1932 – 6 May 2004) was a Fijian cricketer, rugby union player and politician, serving in the Senate.

== Cricket ==
A right-handed batsman and right-arm medium pace bowler, he played first-class cricket for both the Fiji national cricket team and Auckland in the 1950s.

He made his first-class debut against Otago on Fiji's 1954 tour of New Zealand, playing three further matches on the tour. He then attended university in New Zealand, and played four first-class matches for Auckland in the Plunket Shield.

== Rugby union ==
Uluiviti played at full-back for the Fiji national rugby union team's tour of New Zealand in 1957, playing two Tests against the New Zealand Māori, scoring 23 points in total.
