= John Collins (Fijian cricketer) =

Fijian cricketer

Personal information
- Full name: John Cyril Collins

Career statistics
Competition	First-class
Matches	6
Runs scored	249
Batting average	24.90
100s/50s	1/0
Top score	128*
Balls bowled	102
Wickets	4
Bowling average	11.75
5 wickets in innings	0
10 wickets in match	0
Best bowling	3/30
Catches/stumpings	1/0
- Source: CricketArchive, 13 October 2007

John Cyril Collins was a Fijian cricketer. He played six first-class matches for the Fiji national cricket team on a tour of New Zealand in 1895. He scored Fiji's only century of the tour, an innings of 128 not out against Hawke's Bay.
