= Ben Cameron =

Australian cricketer (1981–2025)

Personal information
- Full name: Benjamin Peter Cameron
- Born: 21 February 1981; Hobart, Tasmania, Australia
- Died: 15 October 2025 (aged 44); Adelaide, South Australia
- Nickname: Hoppalong, Camo, B:Cam, Cheese
- Height: 1.79 m (5 ft 10 in)
- Batting: Right-handed
- Bowling: Right-arm medium
- Role: Batsman, coach, selector

Domestic team information
- Years: Team
- 2003/04–2006/07: South Australia (squad no. 11)
- First-class debut: 8 February 2004 South Australia v Victoria
- Last First-class: 26 January 2007 South Australia v Victoria
- List A debut: 15 February 2004 South Australia v New South Wales
- Last List A: 31 January 2007 South Australia v Victoria

Career statistics
Competition	First-class	List A
Matches	10	9
Runs scored	422	228
Batting average	23.44	25.33
100s/50s	0/4	0/2
Top score	81	77
Catches/stumpings	5/–	3/–
- Source: CricketArchive, 2 November 2011

Benjamin Peter Cameron (21 February 1981 – 15 October 2025) was an Australian cricket coach and player.

Cameron played for South Australia from 2004 to 2007, playing ten first-class games and nine List A games as a right-handed opening batsman. He scored two half-centuries on his Sheffield Shield debut against Victoria.

Cameron retired from playing in 2007 due to a chronic knee condition. He subsequently took up coaching and coached in South Australian Premier Cricket. He was appointed high performance manager at Vanuatu Cricket and head coach of the Vanuatu national cricket team in March 2022. However, he resigned the positions in January 2023 citing personal reasons.

Cameron died on 15 October 2025 at the age of 44.

== Sources ==
- Cameron's profile at espncricinfo.com
