= Korea Cricket Association =

Sporting organization in South Korea

- Sport: Cricket
- Jurisdiction: National
- Abbreviation: KCA
- Affiliation: International Cricket Council (ICC)
- Affiliation date: 2001
- Regional affiliation: ICC EAP (Asia)
- Affiliation date: 2001

Official website
- www.cricket.or.kr
- (South Korea)

Korea Cricket Association (Korean: 대한크리켓협회) is the official governing body of the sport of cricket in South Korea. The KCA operates Korean national team and Korean women's national team. Its current headquarters is located in Seoul, South Korea. Korea Cricket Association is South Korea's representative at the International Cricket Council and is an associate member and has been a member of that body since 2001 initially as an affiliate member. It is also a member of the East Asia-Pacific Cricket Council.

The 2014 Asian Games featured cricket for both the men's and the women's event and for that purpose a cricket facility was built known as Yeonhui Cricket Ground for the cricket matches to be played in the games.

It has been reported that the crowd capacity of this ground will be 2,352. This is the first cricket stadium in South Korea.

In 2016, the South Korean men's team competed in the inaugural East Asia Cup played among the four teams with Japan, China and Hong Kong Dragons being the other three teams. It was hosted by Japan Cricket Association at Sano International Cricket Ground. The tournament was won by South Korea after beating Japan in the final. In 2017, the South Korean women's team participated in the Women's East Asia Cup in Hong Kong.

In April 2018, the ICC decided to grant full Twenty20 International (T20I) status to all its members. Therefore, all men's Twenty20 matches played between South Korea and other ICC members after 1 January 2019 will be a full T20I and all women's T20 matches with other ICC members after 1 July 2018 have the WT20I status.

== See also ==
- South Korea national cricket team
- South Korea national women's cricket team
- Yeonhui Cricket Ground
- ICC East Asia-Pacific
