= ICC East Asia-Pacific =

Cricket regional governing body

- Abbreviation: ICC EAP
- Formation: 1996; 30 years ago
- Purpose: Cricket administration
- Location: Melbourne, Australia
- Coordinates: 37.818°S 144.980°E
- Region served: Oceania and parts of Asia
- Members: 12
- Official language: English
- Regional Development Manager: Toby Cohen
- Parent organization: ICC
- Website: east-asia-pacific

ICC East Asia-Pacific is the International Cricket Council region responsible for administration of the sport of Cricket in the Pacific area; Oceania and parts of East Asia and Southeast Asia. The ICC EAP was founded in 1996. It is subordinate to the International Cricket Council, and currently has 12 member associations.

The region was founded in 1996 with a regional office established in 1999. The area covered by the region includes two Test nations and ten ICC associate members.

The region is headed by the Regional Development Manager, Andrew Faichney, based in Australia at the offices of Cricket Australia. The region is supported by the Australian and New Zealand cricket team and these are the only official Test cricket members in the region. The five Test cricket countries in Asia (Afghanistan, Bangladesh, India, Pakistan and Sri Lanka who are playing in South Asia) are members of the Asian Cricket Council.

The EAP is responsible for International tournaments and events, such as: participation in competitions, coaching courses (coach education), umpiring courses, youth development and training; junior/schools programs, administration development, marketing and cricket campsites within the region.

== Tournaments ==
EAP is also responsible for organising the ICC EAP Cricket Trophy, which is the regional international championship competition and allows teams within the region to attempt to qualify for the Cricket World Cup in One Day International and Twenty20 matches and other competitions such as Test cricket. The ICC EAP Cricket Trophy includes the ICC EAP Cricket Trophy (One day), which began in 2005, and ICC EAP Cricket Trophy (Twenty20), which started in 2011.

Other tournaments including the East Asia-Pacific region teams include the Trans-Tasman Trophy (Test) and the Chappell–Hadlee Trophy (ODI) between the only two Test status members Australia and New Zealand.

== Members ==
Members of the ICC East Asia-Pacific
| No. | Country | Association | ICC Membership status | ICC membership | ICC EAP membership |
|---|---|---|---|---|---|
Full Members (2)
| 1 | Australia | Cricket Australia | Full Member | 1909 | 1996 |
| 2 | New Zealand | New Zealand Cricket | Full Member | 1926 | 1996 |
Associate members with T20I status (10)
| 3 | Cook Islands | Cook Islands Cricket Association | Associate | 2000 | 2000 |
| 4 | Fiji | Cricket Fiji | Associate | 1966 | 2001 (Note: Fiji was also a member of the ACC between 1996–2001.) |
| 5 | Indonesia | Indonesian Cricket Association | Associate | 2001 | 2001 (Note: Indonesia has ACC membership since 2024 while still remaining a part of ICC EAP region for ICC events qualification pathways.) |
| 6 | Japan | Japan Cricket Association | Associate | 1989 | 2001 (Note: Japan has ACC membership since 2024 while still remaining a part of ICC EAP region for ICC events qualification pathways. Japan was also a member of the ACC between 1996–2001.) |
| 7 | Papua New Guinea | Cricket PNG | Associate | 1973 | 2001 (Note: Papua New Guinea was also a member of the ACC between 1996–2001.) |
| 8 | Philippines | Philippine Cricket Association | Associate | 2003 | 2003 (Note: Philippines has ACC membership since 2025 while still remaining a part of ICC EAP region for ICC events qualification pathways.) |
| 9 | Samoa | Samoa International Cricket Association | Associate | 2000 | 2000 |
| 10 | South Korea | Korea Cricket Association | Associate | 2001 | 2001 |
| 11 | Timor-Leste | Timor Leste Cricket Board | Associate | 2025 | 2025 |
| 12 | Vanuatu | Vanuatu Cricket Association | Associate | 1995 | 1996 |

=== Former members ===
| No. | Country | Association | ICC EAP Membership period |
|---|---|---|---|
| 1. | Tonga | Tonga Cricket Association | 2000–2014 |

=== Future Members ===
| No. | Country | Association | ICC Membership period |
|---|---|---|---|
| 1 | New Caledonia | New Caledonia Cricket Association | —N/a |
| 2 | Solomon Islands | Solomon Islands Cricket Federation | —N/a |

== Map ==
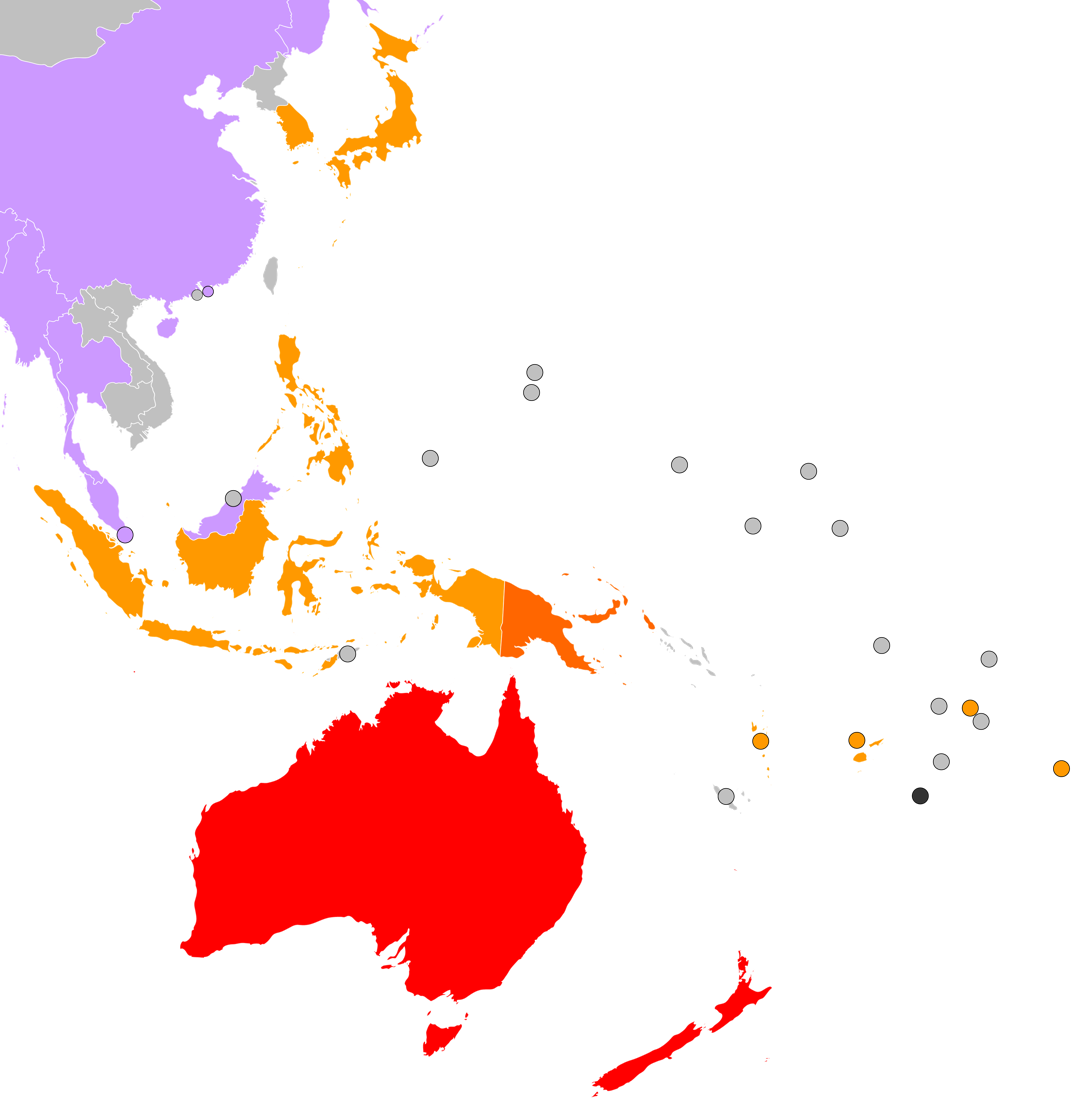
Members of ICC East Asia-Pacific Full ICC members (2) Associate ICC members with ODI status (1) Associate ICC members (9) Former members (1 → Tonga) ICC members part of neighbouring associations Non-members

== See also ==
- Cricket in Oceania
