= 2006 ICC EAP Cricket Trophy (One day) =

Logo of the 2006 ICC EAP Cricket Cup

The 2006 ICC EAP Cricket Trophy was held in Brisbane, Australia from 27 June – 2 July 2006, functioning as the East Asia-Pacific regional final for the 2011 Cricket World Cup and EAP qualification tournament for the inaugural ICC World Cricket League, Division 3. Hosted by Queensland Cricket, the 50-over competition was held at the Peter Burge Oval of the Redlands Cricket Club, located on Wellington Point in southeast Brisbane.

Affiliate nation Cook Islands, plus Associates Japan and Fiji made up the three-team field. Japan and Cook Islands advanced from the six-team 2005 ICC EAP Cricket Cup for fledgling cricketing nations. Fiji were inserted into the latter stage of regional qualifying rather than playing in the EAP Cricket Cup because they were the second-best team (and only other Associate) in the region during 2007 World Cup qualifying. (In fact, fellow EAP region Associate Papua New Guinea defeated Fiji in the WCQS Division 2 repechage competition, earning the final berth into the 2005 ICC Trophy.)

Each team faced the others twice in a double round-robin format, for a total of six matches and four per team. Fiji rolled to easy victories, racking up the maximum of 8 points, while the Japanese and the Cooks split their matches to finish with one win apiece. (Cook Islands finished second based on a higher net run rate.) The closest match was the rain-shortened third match where Japan, chasing 74, rallied from a 5-over total of 14/3 to defeat the Cook Islands on the Duckworth-Lewis method.

Fiji advanced as the East Asia-Pacific region representative in Division 3 of the 2007 World Cricket League.

== 2011 World Cup implications ==
The three-team tournament determined the East Asia-Pacific representative for Division 3 of the 2007 World Cricket League. (One representative from each International Cricket Council Region qualifies for Division 3, the bottom division of the WCL, which will begin play in the early part of the year.)

Qualification for the 2011 Cricket World Cup was and is the ultimate goal of regional and WCL matches, since Division 3 teams can gain promotion up to 2009's World Cup qualifying tournament (or "Division 1") through WCL Division 2. The top teams from Division 2 advance to the 2009 qualifier. Lower teams in Division 2 will return to Division 3 in 2009 without having to advance through the 2008 regional qualifiers to earn a third-division slot.

WCL play is the primary route into the 2011 Cup for non-Test playing nations. (The 2009 WCQ tournament replaces the 2005 ICC Trophy, the qualifying system for the 2007 version, as the pathway to the World Cup.)

== Points table ==
Team	Pts	Pld	W	T	L	NR	NRR
Fiji	8	4	4	0	0	0	1.03
Cook Islands	2	4	1	0	3	0	-0.33
Japan	2	4	1	0	3	0	-0.63

=== Match 1: Fiji vs. Japan (27 June) ===
scorecard

v

=== Match 2: Fiji vs. Cook Islands (28 June) ===
scorecard

v

=== Match 3: Japan vs. Cook Islands (29 June) ===
scorecard

v

=== Match 4: Fiji vs. Japan (30 June) ===
scorecard

v

=== Match 5: Fiji vs. Cook Islands (1 July) ===
scorecard

v

=== Match 6: Cook Islands vs. Japan (2 July) ===
scorecard

v
