= Kilikiti =

Form of cricket originating in Samoa

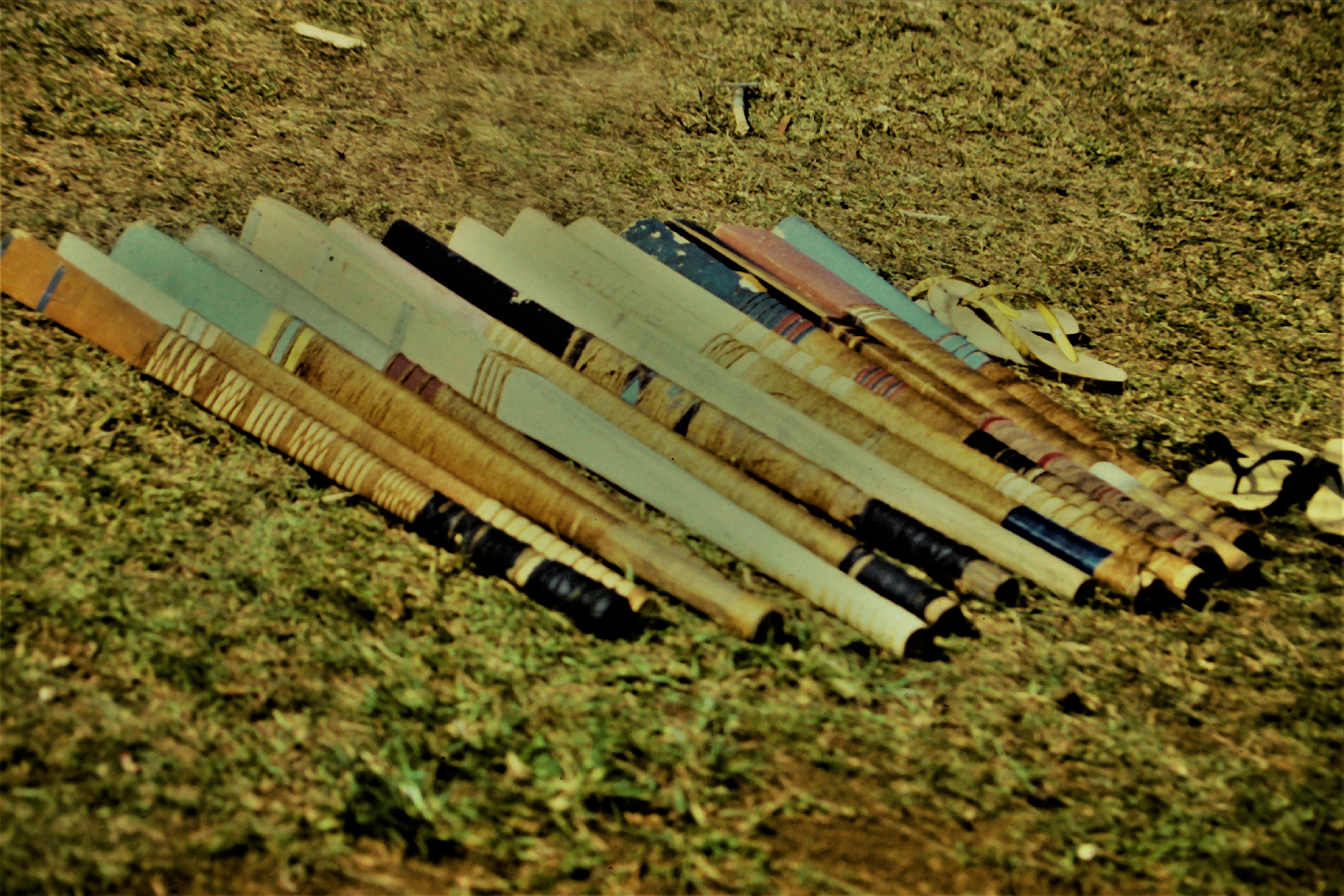
Kilikiti bats

Kilikiti, also known as Samoan cricket or kirikiti, is one of several forms of the game of cricket. Originating in Samoa (English missionaries introduced their game of cricket in the early 19th century), it spread throughout Polynesia and can now be found around the world in areas with strong Polynesian populations. The game is the national sport of Samoa and is played in many other Pacific countries, including amongst the Pacific Islander diaspora in Australia and New Zealand.

== Etymology ==
The term kilikiti is borrowed from Samoan, Tongan and Tuvaluan. Kilikiti is the Samoan and Tongan term for the sport of cricket and derived from English. The term in Samoan is sometimes spelt kirikiti, which is also the Māori name for the sport.

== Form of the game ==
=== Equipment ===
The ball is made of a very hard rubber wrapped in pandanus. Players are not protected by any padding or masks, and will often wear only a lava-lava. The sennit-wrapped wooden bat is modeled on the three-sided Samoan war club called the "lapalapa," which is based on the stalk of coconut fronds. Bats are shaped to individual players' liking and can be over a meter long. This is because the striking surface of the bat is angled (just as the "lapalapa" club and the coconut frond stalk), and the path of a hit ball is extremely hard to predict.

=== Rules ===
The rules of kilikiti are flexible. Indeed, the majority of reports written in the game simply say that the rules can only be known by those playing.

==== Similarities to cricket ====
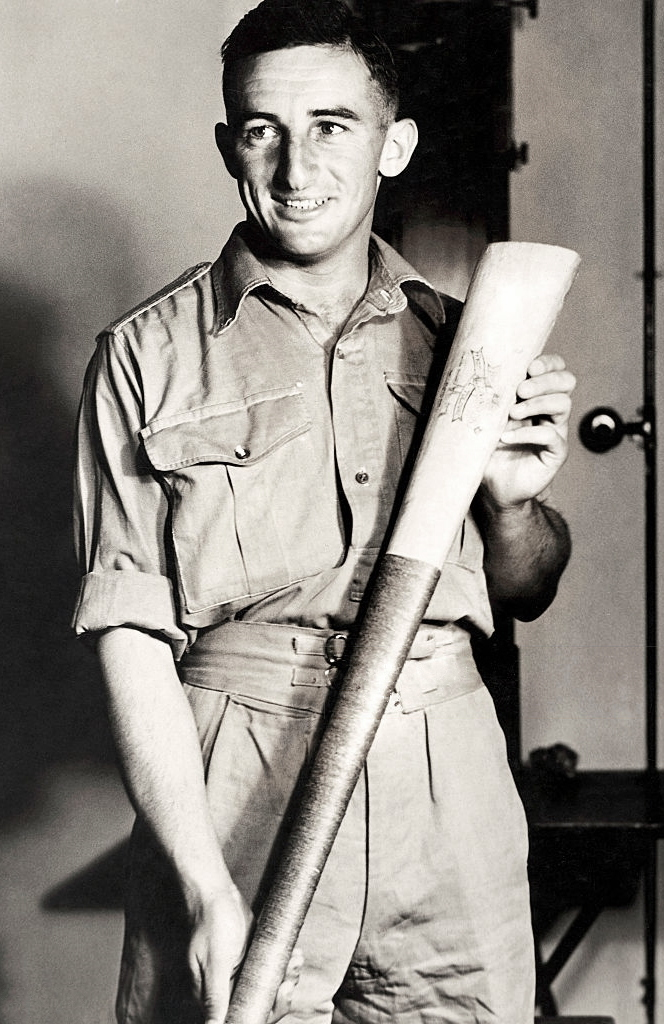
Australian cricketer Jock Livingston with a Kilikiti bat

There is a batting team, a fielding team, and a pitch (sometimes of concrete). The bowl alternates between two bowlers, one at each end of the pitch; accordingly, there are two wicket keepers (this as opposed to the single wicket keeper in cricket).

==== Major points on which kilikiti differs from cricket ====
There is no limit to team size, and teams are made up of whoever turns up regardless of gender or age. Tourist accounts mention that strangers are often welcomed. Players are typically all-rounders.

A kilikiti game is a multi-day community event full of singing, dancing, and feasting. Entire villages will compete and everyone will be involved, whether as player, cook, or spectator. According to one source, the only universal rule is that the host team forfeits if it cannot provide enough food.

==== Standardization ====
The New Zealand Kilikiti Association (NZKA) is working to standardize the rules of kilikiti. In 1999 the NZKA started a national tournament, called the Supercific Kilikiti Tournament, and in 2001 it introduced the international World Cup Kilikiti Tournament. Games have been cut to a television-friendly 70 minutes (2 innings, the first being 30 minutes long and the second bowling the same number of balls as the first). The NZKA has also added the scoring of 4s and 6s.

== By country ==
=== Australia ===
Kilikiti is a growing sport in Australia, particularly among Samoan Australians.

The Fetuilelagi Kilikiti Tournament is held annually in Brisbane. In 2022, 15 teams competed.

Tournaments have also been held in other cities, such as Melbourne and Sydney.

=== New Zealand ===
Kilikiti has become a popular sport across New Zealand. It is especially popular among Samoan New Zealanders.

Tournaments have been held across the country, mostly in Auckland.

The Counties Manukau Kilikiti Association is the main league for the sport in New Zealand.

=== Samoa ===
Kilikiti originated in Samoa and is popular nationwide.

=== Other Pacific Islands ===
Like in Samoa, the sport is also widespread in American Samoa.

The sport has also been played in Fiji, Niue, Tokelau, Tonga and Tuvalu.

=== Elsewhere ===
The sport has also been played in countries such as the United States.

== See also ==
- Cricket in Oceania
- Trobriand cricket
