= Bruce Massey =

New Zealand cricketer

Personal information
- Full name: Harold Bruce Massey
- Born: 13 April 1906; Gisborne, New Zealand
- Died: 9 July 1994 (aged 88); Queensland, Australia
- Batting: Right-handed
- Bowling: Right-arm medium

Domestic team information
- Years: Team
- 1926-27 to 1932-33: Wellington

Career statistics
| Competition | First-class |
|---|---|
| Matches | 15 |
| Runs scored | 331 |
| Batting average | 22.06 |
| 100s/50s | 0/2 |
| Top score | 64 |
| Balls bowled | 2504 |
| Wickets | 32 |
| Bowling average | 32.18 |
| 5 wickets in innings | 1 |
| 10 wickets in match | 0 |
| Best bowling | 5/56 |
| Catches/stumpings | 13/– |
- Source: CricketArchive, 14 December 2017

Harold Bruce Massey (13 April 1906 – 9 July 1994) was a New Zealand cricketer who played first-class cricket for Wellington from 1927 to 1932.

Bruce Massey made his debut in representative cricket in 1923 while still a student at Palmerston North Boys' High School. Playing for a combined Manawatu, Rangitikei and Wairarapa side against the touring MCC team, he opened the bowling in the second innings and took 4 for 14 off 11 overs. The MCC team's vice-captain, Jock Hartley, considered Massey the most promising young player they had seen in New Zealand.

He made his first-class debut in the 1926-27 season, taking five wickets for Wellington against Auckland. In 1927-28 he played a match for The Rest against the returning New Zealand touring team. A few weeks later, against Otago, he took 5 for 56, then, batting at number ten in Wellington’s second innings, made 64 and added 123 for the last wicket. Later that season, against the touring Australians, he again made 64. This time he went to the wicket at number eleven, with Wellington’s score 126 for 9, and added 104 for the last wicket with Ken James. He continued to play for Wellington until 1932-33.

In December 1935 and January 1936 he captained a team of 15 young New Zealand cricketers, called the Maoriland cricket team, on a tour of Fiji. The team played 10 matches, including three three-day matches against Fiji. None of the matches were first-class.
