= New Caledonia women's national cricket team =

New Caledonia
- Kanak Flag of New Caledonia

International Cricket Council
- ICC status: Non-member
- ICC region: East Asia-Pacific
- As of 14 Mar 2019

The New Caledonia women's national cricket team represents the country of New Caledonia in women's cricket matches.

In April 2018, the International Cricket Council (ICC) granted full Women's Twenty20 International (WT20I) status to all its members. However, as of October 2019 New Caledonia are not members of the ICC.

== History ==
Cricket was introduced to New Caledonia by English missionaries. It is currently mostly played by women.

In April 2024, it was reported that the Association France Cricket was seeking to incorporate New Caledonian women into the France women's national cricket team, following conflict between the governing body and the existing women's squad.

== See also ==
- New Caledonia national cricket team
