= Cricket in Norfolk Island =

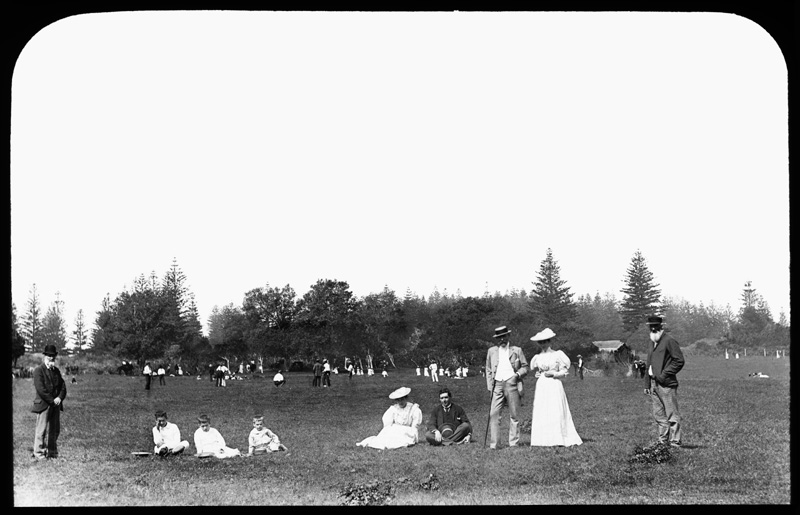
Spectators congregating at a cricket match on Norfolk Island in November 1908.

Cricket is recorded as having been played on Norfolk Island, an external territory of Australia, as early as 1838, by soldiers stationed on the island. It continued to be played after the island was settled in 1856 by Pitcairn Islanders, descended from the mutineers of the Bounty and of mixed European and Polynesian stock. John Patteson, an ex-first-class cricketer and future Bishop of Melanesia, was a missionary on Norfolk during that period. From 1876 until well into the 20th century, a match was played annually on Bounty Day, the national holiday, a tradition that was resumed in 1997. In 2001, it was reported that there were three clubs on the island (playing both a knockout tournament and a regular league), regular tours from the Australian mainland, and a junior development program, assisted by the New South Wales Cricket Association (NSWCA). Norfolk Island's cricket ground is located at Kingston Oval (or Kingston Common), which is the oldest cricket pitch in the Southern Hemisphere used since 1838, now with artificial matting overlooked by Kingston's convict-era buildings, which are World Heritage Sites.

A Norfolk Island representative team toured Auckland, New Zealand, in January 2001, and played at least two matches – one against an Auckland Secondary Schools team, and then a 50-over fixture against the Cook Islands, which it lost by seven wickets. Those matches are the only ones recorded for an island representative team. Excluded from the Pacifica Cup, which was played in 2001 and 2002, the Norfolk Island Cricket Association had expressed its intention to enter a team into the cricket tournament at the 2003 South Pacific Games, but this, along with its desire for affiliate membership of the ICC, did not eventuate. Their last tour was to the Pitcairn Islands in 2014.

== See also ==
- Sport in Norfolk Island
- Cricket in Australia
- Cricket in Queensland
