= Postage stamps and postal history of Wallis and Futuna =

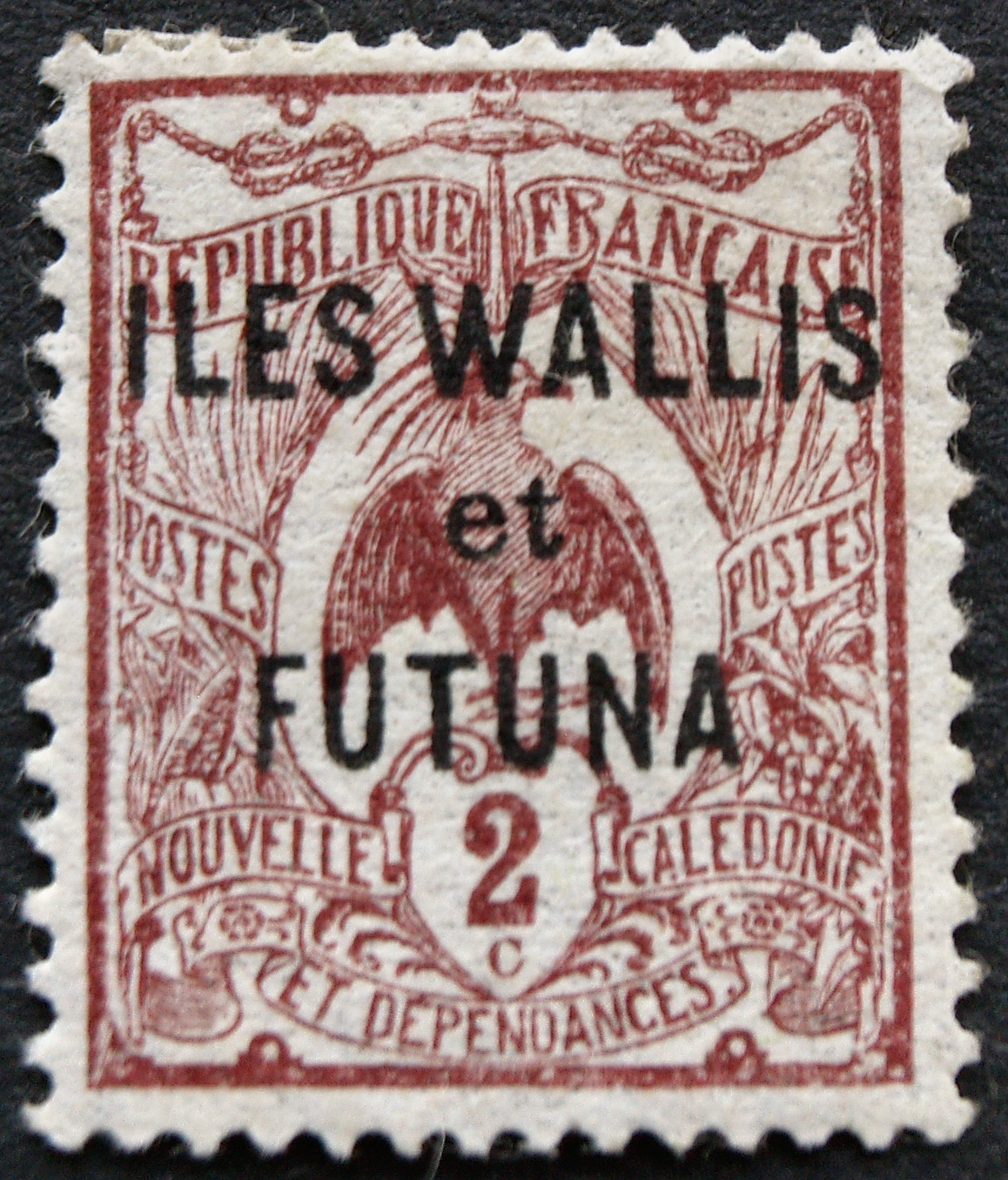
A New Caledonia stamp overprinted in 1920 for use in the islands

This is a survey of the postage stamps and postal history of the Wallis and Futuna Islands.

The Wallis and Futuna Islands are a Polynesian French island territory in the South Pacific between Tuvalu to the northwest, Rotuma of Fiji to the west and the main part of Fiji to the southwest.

== First stamps ==
The first stamps for the islands were overprinted stamps of New Caledonia issued in May 1920.
