= ICC EAP Cricket Trophy =

- Administrator: ICC East Asia-Pacific
- Format: Limited overs cricket, Twenty20
- First edition: 2005 (Limited overs); 2009 (Twenty20)
- Tournament format: League system
- Number of teams: 8 nations
- Current champion: Papua New Guinea
- Most successful: Japan (2 titles)

The ICC EAP Cricket Trophy is a regional division of the ICC World Cricket League, providing opportunities for cricket playing nations in the East-Asia Pacific Region to compete against one another. It also acts as the regional qualifier for entry into the World Cricket League.

== Tournaments ==
=== List A ===
The ICC EAP Cricket Trophy (One day) is the Limited overs cricket format of the ICC EAP Cricket Trophy.

== Twenty20 ==
=== 2009 ===
This was the first time that Twenty20 games were played in the EAP trophy. The matches were held from 17–18 September with the eight teams being split into two groups of four in which each team played the other three. The play-offs were based on the final standings from the group stage. The final was between Papua New Guinea and Fiji and Papua New Guinea won comfortably.

Pos.	Team
1	Papua New Guinea
2	Fiji
3	Samoa
4	Japan
5	Vanuatu
6	Cook Islands
7	Tonga
8	Indonesia

=== 2011 ===
Division Two

Division Two of the 2011 EAP Trophy was held in Apia, Samoa from 2–8 April. The tournament was a Twenty20 competition. After a round robin group stage of five matches each, Samoa easily beat the Philippines in the final, winning the tournament and promotion to Division One.

Division One

Division One of the 2011 EAP Trophy is due to be held in Papua New Guinea in July, with the winner due to progress to the 2012 ICC World Twenty20 Qualifier, the final qualification tournament for the 2012 ICC World Twenty20 due to be held in Sri Lanka.

== Tournament results ==
Year	Champions	Runners-Up	3rd Place	4th Place	5th Place
2009	Papua New Guinea	Fiji	Samoa	Japan	Vanuatu

Year	Division I		Division II	
Year	Winner	Runners-up	Winner	Runners-up
2011	Papua New Guinea	Vanuatu	Samoa	Philippines

Year	Champions	Runners-Up	3rd Place	4th Place	5th Place	6th Place	7th Place	8th Place
2013	Papua New Guinea	Vanuatu	Fiji	Samoa	Japan	Cook Islands	Indonesia	
2014	Papua New Guinea	Vanuatu	Fiji	Samoa	Philippines	Japan	Indonesia	Cook Islands

== See also ==
- Cricket World Cup
- International Cricket Council
