= Neil Maxwell =

Australian–Fijian businessman and ex-cricketer

Personal information
- Full name: Neil Donald Maxwell
- Born: 12 June 1967 (age 59); Lautoka, Viti Levu, Fiji
- Batting: Right-handed
- Bowling: Right-arm fast-medium

International information
- National side: Fiji

Domestic team information
- Years: Team
- 1991/92–1992/93: Victoria
- 1993/94–1995/96: New South Wales
- 1997/98: Canterbury

Career statistics
| Competition | First-class | List A |
|---|---|---|
| Matches | 35 | 27 |
| Runs scored | 1,166 | 288 |
| Batting average | 25.91 | 20.57 |
| 100s/50s | 0/6 | 0/1 |
| Top score | 91 | 60 |
| Balls bowled | 6,273 | 1,263 |
| Wickets | 99 | 37 |
| Bowling average | 29.88 | 22.18 |
| 5 wickets in innings | 2 | 1 |
| 10 wickets in match | 0 | 0 |
| Best bowling | 6/56 | 5/25 |
| Catches/stumpings | 46/– | 10/– |
- Source: Cricinfo, 15 March 2010

Neil Donald Maxwell (born 12 June 1967) is a former Fijian cricketer who played in Australia. Maxwell was a right-handed batsman who bowled right-arm fast-medium. He was born at Lautoka.

Maxwell played for Canterbury, New South Wales and Victoria cricket teams in the 1990s. He played for Fiji in the 1990 ICC Trophy in the Netherlands. His figures of 5/10 against Singapore in the 2001 ICC Trophy are the best in that competition by a Fijian.

As of 2024, Maxwell is the player agent for Australian fast bowlers Pat Cummins and Josh Hazlewood, having previously managed Brett Lee, Michael Hussey, and Adam Gilchrist. He was formerly the CEO of the Kings XI Punjab franchise in the Indian Premier League, and also served on the boards of the Australian Cricketers' Association and Cricket NSW (2018–2023). With ex-cricketer Shane Lee, he co-founded the marketing firm Insite Organisation, sold to Mitchell Communication Group in 2009.

Maxwell is a long-time advocate for greater private ownership in cricket. After initially recommending against the establishment of an Australian T20 franchise league, by 2010 he was reported to be the "mastermind" of a plan to set up a domestic league backed by Cricket NSW and Cricket Victoria, together with Indian Premier League investors. He was one of the drivers behind the December 2010 establishment of Cricket Holdings America, a joint venture between the United States of America Cricket Association and New Zealand Cricket to set up an American T20 league, initially serving on the board before succeeding Keith Wyness as CEO in September 2012. He was also the originator of a mid-2020s proposal to set up a four-location, seven- or eight- team global T20 'Grand Slam' with support from the World Cricketers' Association and Australian Cricketers' Association and financial backing from Saudi Arabia's Public Investment Fund.
