= Cricket at the 2007 South Pacific Games =

Cricket at the 2007 South Pacific Games was contested by five teams. Papua New Guinea won the gold medal, Fiji won the silver, and Samoa won the bronze. Tonga and New Caledonia were the other participating nations.

== Tournament ==
Unlike the 2003 tournament, no finals matches were held, with the gold medal going to the team that topped the pool stage. This was Papua New Guinea, who won all four of their matches, including a record-breaking 510 run win over New Caledonia.

=== Final standings ===
Team	Pts	Pld	W	T	L	NR
Papua New Guinea	8	4	4	0	0	0
Fiji	6	4	3	0	1	0
Samoa	4	4	2	0	2	0
Tonga	2	4	1	0	3	0
New Caledonia	0	4	0	0	4	0
