= David Little (cricketer) =

New Zealand cricketer (born 1974)

Personal information
- Born: 1 July 1974 (age 52); Lower Hutt, New Zealand
- Source: Cricinfo, 24 October 2020

David Little (born 1 July 1974) is a New Zealand cricketer. He played in one first-class and three List A matches for Wellington in 1998/99.
