= New Caledonia national cricket team =

New Caledonia
- Emblem of New Caledonia

International Cricket Council
- ICC status: Non member

International cricket
- First international: 3 February 2001 v Fiji at Colin Maiden Park, Auckland
- As of 14 October 2007

The New Caledonia cricket team is the team that represents the French overseas territory of New Caledonia in international cricket matches. They are not currently a member of the International Cricket Council, though they have taken part in various regional tournaments such as the Pacifica Cup and the cricket tournaments of the South Pacific Games.

They have lost every single match they have played, twice conceding 500 runs to Papua New Guinea.

== History ==
Cricket was introduced to New Caledonia by English missionaries. It is currently mostly played by women.

In April 2024, it was reported by France 24 that Prebagarane Balane, the chairman of Association France Cricket, had signed a memorandum of understanding with New Caledonia's sports minister Mickaël Forrest, which would oblige the local cricket committee to register all 3,000 of its players with France Cricket. The MOU grants France Cricket "the right to call up players in New Caledonia for the French national team, but not if they play the non-standard form of the game"

=== Pacifica Cup ===
The Pacifica Cup took place twice, in 2001 and 2002. The 2001 tournament was hosted in Auckland, New Zealand. New Caledonia's tournament started badly with a 360 run defeat by Fiji, in which three Fijian batsmen retired after scoring centuries in their innings of 433/5. In their next match against Vanuatu, they restricted their opponents to 284/7 from their 50 overs, but still lost heavily when they were bowled out for 115 to lose by 169 runs. The first round concluded with a 309 run defeat by Tonga when they were bowled out for just 25.

The play-off stages didn't go much better for the New Caledonians, starting with a 231 run loss to the Cook Islands. They came up against Vanuatu in the seventh place play-off, and batted first, scoring 97. Their opponents reached this target inside 12 overs thanks to a quick-fire innings of 66 from Richard Tatwin to win by six wickets.

The 2002 Pacifica Cup took place in Apia, Samoa. New Caledonia started with a match against Vanuatu, which they lost by seven wickets. Their second match against the tournament hosts Samoa was lost by seven wickets when no New Caledonia batsman reached double figures.

Another comprehensive defeat, this time losing by 278 runs to Tonga continued their tournament, which concluded with a 314 run defeat by the Cook Islands, which saw Cook Islands bowler Dunu Eliaba take nine wickets in the New Caledonia innings, which he finished off with a hat-trick. New Caledonia thus finished seventh in the tournament.

=== South Pacific Games ===
The cricket tournament of the 2003 South Pacific Games in Fiji started with New Caledonia taking on Samoa. As was becoming the case by this time, they lost, this time by 147 runs. The following match saw yet another comprehensive defeat as New Caledonia lost to the Cook Islands by 254 runs. Their third tournament match, against Fiji went much the same way, losing by ten wickets.

Vanuatu beat New Caledonia by 108 runs in their next tournament match, before a match against Papua New Guinea saw history made as Papua New Guinea scored the first total over 500 in international one-day cricket, winning the match by 468 runs. New Caledonia thus finished last in the tournament.

New Caledonia returned to international cricket competition in 2007 when they took part in the cricket tournament of the 2007 South Pacific Games in Samoa. They started with a heavy defeat, losing to Fiji by 383 runs. Their second match continued their losing streak as Tonga beat them by nine wickets.

After a rest day, New Caledonia took on Papua New Guinea, who beat their own record for the highest score in an international cricket match by scoring 572/7 in 49 overs. They then bowled out New Caledonia for 62 to win by 510 runs. Both the Papua New Guinean score and the winning margin are records for international cricket. The tournament concluded for New Caledonia with a nine wicket defeat by Samoa, with New Caledonia again finishing last.

== Tournament history ==
=== Pacifica Cup ===
- 2001: 8th place
- 2002: 7th place

=== Pacific Games ===
- 1979: 6th place
- 1987: 4th place
- 1991: 6th place
- 2003: 6th place
- 2007: 5th place
- 2011: 4th place
- 2015: 4th place
- 2019: 4th place
