= Cricket at the 2011 Pacific Games =

- Cricket format: Twenty20
- Host: New Caledonia
- Champions: Papua New Guinea (6th title)
- Participants: 4 teams (men)

Cricket at the 2011 Pacific Games in Nouméa, New Caledonia was held on August 29–September 2, 2011. The tournament format was changed from the 50 over cricket previously played to the shorter Twenty20 form of the game.

== Results ==
Event	Gold	Silver	Bronze
Men	Papua New Guinea	Fiji	Vanuatu

== Participating teams ==
- Fiji
- New Caledonia
- Papua New Guinea
- Vanuatu

== Format ==
The four teams play a round robin before the best ranked team faces the second best team in the final.

== Preliminary round ==
Team	Pld	W	T	L	RF	RA	Diff	NRR	Pts
Papua New Guinea	3	3	0	0	393	241	+152	+3.644	9
Fiji	3	2	0	1	416	280	+136	+1.680	7
Vanuatu	3	1	0	2	420	267	+153	+2.397	5
New Caledonia	3	0	0	3	176	617	−441	−7.350	3

29 August 2011
08:00
Scorecard

Fiji; 212/4 (20 overs)	v	New Caledonia; 79/10 (19.4 overs)

Fiji won by 133 runs
Terrain de cricket N'Du, Nouméa

29 August 2011
13:00
Scorecard

Vanuatu; 103/8 (20 overs)	v	Papua New Guinea; 104/6 (18 overs)

Papua New Guinea won by 4 wickets
Terrain de cricket N'Du, Nouméa

30 August 2011
08:00
Scorecard

Fiji; 113/3 (20 overs)	v	Vanuatu; 109/8 (20 overs)

Fiji won by 4 runs
Terrain de cricket N'Du, Nouméa

30 August 2011
13:00
Scorecard

Papua New Guinea; 197/6 (20 overs)	v	New Caledonia; 47/10 (14 overs)

Papua New Guinea won by 150 runs
Terrain de cricket N'Du, Nouméa

31 August 2011
08:00
Scorecard

Vanuatu; 208/4 (20 overs)	v	New Caledonia; 50/10 (13.3 overs)

Vanuatu won by 158 runs
Terrain de cricket N'Du, Nouméa

31 August 2011
13:00
Scorecard

Fiji; 91/10 (19.2 overs)	v	Papua New Guinea; 92/3 (13.3 overs)

Papua New Guinea won by 7 wickets
Terrain de cricket N'Du, Nouméa

== Knockout stage ==
=== Third place game ===
2 September 2011
08:00

New Caledonia; 85-9 (20 overs)	v	Vanuatu; 87-0 (9.4 overs)

Vanuatu won by 10 wickets
Terrain de cricket N'Du, Nouméa

=== Final ===
2 September 2011
13:00

Papua New Guinea; 172/6 (20 overs)	v	Fiji; 90/9 (20 overs)

Papua New Guinea Won by 62 runs
Terrain de cricket N'Du, Nouméa
