= Cricket at the 2003 South Pacific Games =

- Location: Suva

Cricket at the 2003 South Pacific Games was contested by six teams. The gold medal was won by Papua New Guinea.

== First round ==
The six participating teams were placed in one pool. Papua New Guinea won all five of their matches, including a match against New Caledonia where they scored more than 500 runs. Fiji finished second in the group, thus joining Papua New Guinea in the gold medal match, where the latter won by 2 runs. In the bronze medal match, Cook Islands defeated Samoa by 85 runs.

=== Standings ===
Team	Pts	Pld	W	T	L	NR
Papua New Guinea	10	5	5	0	0	0
Fiji	6	5	3	0	2	0
Samoa	6	5	3	0	2	0
Cook Islands	6	5	3	0	2	0
Vanuatu	2	5	1	0	4	0
New Caledonia	0	5	0	0	5	0

=== Bronze medal match ===
9 August 2003

Cook Islands; 198 all out (44 overs)	v	Samoa; 113 all out (38 overs)
Teunu Eliaba 61; Peniamina Ioka 2/21 (4 overs)		William Clarke 27; Moumou Marurai 4/46 (8 overs)

Cook Islands won by 85 runs
Suva Grammar School

=== Gold medal match ===
9 August 2003

Papua New Guinea; 147/9 (40 overs)	v	Fiji; 145 all out (40 overs)
John Ovia 50; Jone Seuvou 4/26 (8 overs)		Taione Batina 41; Inoa Baeau 3/31 (8 overs)

Papua New Guinea won by 2 runs
Albert Park

== See also ==
- 2003 South Pacific Games
