= 1979 South Pacific Games =

6th edition of the South Pacific Games

- Host city: Suva
- Country: Fiji
- Nations: 19
- Athletes: 2,672 ^{*}
- Events: 18 sports
- Opening: August 28, 1979
- Closing: September 8, 1979
- Main venue: National Stadium (Suva)

The 6th South Pacific Games (Fijian: 6 ni Qito ena Ceva ni Pasifika), also known as Suva 1979, held in Suva, Fiji from 28 August to 8 September 1979, was the sixth edition of the South Pacific Games.

== Participating countries ==
Nineteen Pacific nations or territories attended:

- American Samoa
- Cook Islands
- Fiji
- French Polynesia
- Guam
- Kiribati
- Nauru
- New Caledonia
- New Hebrides
- Niue
- Norfolk Island
- Northern Marianas
- Papua New Guinea
- Solomon Islands
- Tokelau
- Tonga
- Tuvalu
- Wallis and Futuna
- Western Samoa

== Sports ==
There were 18 sports contested at the 1979 South Pacific Games:^{†}

- Athletics (37)
- Basketball (2)
- Boxing (11)
- Cricket (1)
- Field hockey (1)
- Football (1)
- Golf (4)
- Judo (9)
- Lawn bowls (8)
- Netball (1) ^{a}
- Rugby union (1)
- Sailing (1)
- Squash (2)
- Swimming (24) ^{b}
- Table tennis (7) ^{c}
- Tennis (7)
- Volleyball (2)
- Weightlifting (10) ^{d}
Note: A number in parentheses indicates how many medal events were contested in that sport (where known).

== Medal table ==
New Caledonia topped the table again:

* Host nation (Fiji)

Rank	Nation	Gold	Silver	Bronze	Total
1	New Caledonia (NCL)	33	43	26	102
2	French Polynesia (PYF)	31	19	29	79
3	Fiji (FIJ)*	22	16	24	62
4	Papua New Guinea (PNG)	16	19	21	56
5	Guam (GUM)	11	7	9	27
6	Western Samoa (WSM)	10	11	6	27
7	American Samoa (ASA)	4	1	7	12
8	Tonga (TON)	1	5	3	9
9	Cook Islands (COK)	1	2	3	6
10	New Hebrides (New Hebrides)	0	4	4	8
11	Norfolk Island (NFK)	0	1	3	4
12	Wallis and Futuna	0	1	2	3
13	Solomon Islands (SOL)	0	0	5	5
14	Kiribati (KIR)	0	0	0	0
14	Nauru (NRU)	0	0	0	0
14	Niue (NIU)	0	0	0	0
14	Northern Marianas (NMI)	0	0	0	0
14	Tokelau (TOK)	0	0	0	0
14	Tuvalu (TUV)	0	0	0	0
Totals (19 entries)		129	129	142	400

== See also ==
- Athletics at the 1979 South Pacific Games
- Football at the 1979 South Pacific Games

== Notes ==
^* For the 1979 Games, 19 countries and a projected 2,672 athletes took part.

^† Eighteen sports as reported in Pacific Islands Monthly. The newly introduced sports were: cricket, field hockey, lawn bowls, and squash.

^a Netball: In Pacific Islands Monthly (PIM), it was reported that "Papua New Guinea took the bronze" in the 1979 netball competition, behind Fiji and Cook Islands. However, a few pages later in PIM's results for the netball, Tonga is listed as finishing in third place.

^b Swimming: There were either 24 or 23 events on the programme, depending on whether the men's 4 × 200 m freestyle relay was contested and officially included in the medals. A publication from Guam's Political Status Education Coordinating Commission claims that Guam swimmer Hollis Kimbrough, "won a record seven medals in the '79 SPG alone", and as such, the Pacific Islands Monthly results could be incomplete as only four medals are listed for Kimbrough there plus two men's relay medals for Guam – and the men's 4 × 200 is omitted.

^c Table tennis: There were seven events on the programme (or perhaps only six or five, depending on whether the respective team competitions for men and women were played and medals officially awarded). The five events for table tennis in the list of results from the November 1979 issue of Pacific Islands Monthly (PIM) are the mixed doubles, men's and women's singles and doubles. PIM reported earlier in the same issue that Fiji had won the women's team event (as well as the women's doubles), but neither women's or men's team events appear in the PIM results.

^d Weightlifting: Ten men's weight divisions were contested, with one medal event only per division (for the maximum total lift of snatch + clean-and-jerk).

== Sources ==
- "Last of the Super Games/The Medal Winners" (PDF). Pacific Islands Monthly. 50 (10). 1979. Archived from the original (PDF 0.8 MB) on 4 July 2016.
- 1979 South Pacific Games Results. Oceania Sport Information Centre (Report). Archived from the original on 31 October 2015.
