= Vanuatu national cricket team =

Vanuatu
- Association: Vanuatu Cricket Association

Personnel
- Captain: Joshua Rasu
- Coach: Chris Laffan

International Cricket Council
- ICC status: Associate member (2009); Affiliate member (1995)
- ICC region: East Asia-Pacific
ICC Rankings	Current	Best-ever
T20I	67th	43rd (26 February 2023)

International cricket
- First international: New Hebrides v. Fiji (Suva; 30 August 1979)

T20 Internationals
- First T20I: v Papua New Guinea at Amini Park, Port Moresby; 22 March 2019
- Last T20I: v Papua New Guinea at Sano International Cricket Ground, Sano; 17 May 2026
T20Is	Played	Won/Lost
Total	46	19/27 (0 ties, 0 no result)
This year	6	2/4 (0 ties, 0 no results)
- T20 World Cup Qualifier appearances: 1 (Note: For the 2024 and 2026 Men's T20 World Cups, the final round of qualification in East Asia-Pacific was the ICC EAP Regional Final.) (first in 2023)
- Best result: 3rd (2023)
T20I kit
- As of 17 May 2026

The Vanuatu national cricket team is the men's team that represents Vanuatu in international cricket. The team is organised by the Vanuatu Cricket Association, which became an affiliate member of the International Cricket Council (ICC) in 1995 and an associate member in 2009. Vanuatu made its international debut at the 1979 Pacific Games, at which time the country was still known as the New Hebrides. The majority of the team's matches have come against other members of the ICC East Asia-Pacific region, including both at ICC regional tournaments and at the cricket events at the Pacific Games.

Vanuatu entered the World Cricket League at the 2008 Division Five tournament. The team participated in the WCL system at the 2015 Division Six event, where it placed third. Following the withdrawal of Suriname from the 2016 Division Five tournament, Vanuatu were named as their replacement. After the abolition of the WCL, Vanuatu became part of the 2019–22 ICC Cricket World Cup Challenge League.

== History ==
Vanuatu competed in the Pacifica Championships on the two occasions it was held, finishing seventh in 2001 and sixth in 2002. In 2005, they hosted the East Asia/Pacific Cricket Cup, finishing third in the six team competition, therefore missing out on qualification for the 2007 World Cup. At the East Asia – Pacific Trophy in Auckland, New Zealand, in December 2007, Vanuatu finished second, therefore qualifying through to the World Cricket League Division Five in 2008. In the highly successful 2009 calendar year, Vanuatu defeated Fiji in two One-Day Series in Port Vila as well as claiming the prestigious 2009 ICC EAP Men's Cricket Trophy (Non-World Cricket League) held in Samoa, defeating the hosts in the final. At a junior level, Vanuatu has finished second to Papua New Guinea in the following competitions: East Asia – Pacific Under 15 Super 8s, Melbourne, Australia, 2005; East Asia – Pacific Under 15 Super 8s, Apia, Samoa, 2007; East Asia – Pacific Under 19 World Cup Qualifying Tournament, Port Vila, Vanuatu, 2007.

Vanuatu finished third in the 2010 ICC World Cricket League Division Eight in Kuwait. This means they stayed in that league for the 2012 competition.

=== 2018–present ===
At the 2018 ICC World Cricket League Division Four tournament, Vanuatu recorded victories against Bermuda, a former ODI team, and Denmark, which has previously played as high as Division Two. However, they were still relegated to Division Five based on net run rate.

In April 2018, the ICC decided to grant full Twenty20 International (T20I) status to all its members. Therefore, all Twenty20 matches played between Vanuatu and other ICC members since 1 January 2019 have the full T20I status.

Vanuatu made its Twenty20 International debut on 22 March 2019, losing to Papua New Guinea by 8 wickets in the 2018–19 ICC T20 World Cup East Asia-Pacific Qualifier at Amini Park, Port Moresby, Papua New Guinea

22 March 2019
13:45
Scorecard

Vanuatu; 124/6 (20 overs)	v	Papua New Guinea; 125/2 (15.2 overs)
Nalin Nipiko 53 (55); Lega Siaka 2/7 (2 overs)		Tony Ura 65 (37); Williamsing Nalisa 1/29 (4 overs)

Papua New Guinea won by 8 wickets
Amini Park, Port Moresby
Umpires: Tabarak Dar (HK) and Simon Fry (Aus)
Player of the match: Tony Ura (PNG)

- Vanuatu won the toss and elected to bat.
- First ever T20I match for Vanuatu.

After April 2019, Vanuatu played in the 2019–21 ICC Cricket World Cup Challenge League.

In August 2019, Australian Clint McKay was appointed as the interim coach of the team, ahead of the 2019 Malaysia Cricket World Cup Challenge League A tournament.

== Tournament history ==
Legend

- Champions
- Runners-up
- Third place/Semi-finals
- Hosts
- Q Qualified/Advanced to next stage
- DNQ Did not qualify
- ▲ Promoted
- Remained in the same division
- ▼ Relegated

=== Cricket World Cup ===
Cricket World Cup record								Qualification record				
Year	Round	Position	Pld	W	L	T	NR	Pld	W	L	T	NR
(England) 1975	Not an ICC member							Not an ICC member				
(England) 1979	Not an ICC member							Not an ICC member				
(England) (Wales) 1983	Not an ICC member							Not an ICC member				
(India) (Pakistan) 1987	Not an ICC member							Not an ICC member				
(Australia) (New Zealand) 1992	Not an ICC member							Not an ICC member				
(Pakistan) (India) (Sri Lanka) 1996	Not eligible; ICC affiliate member							Not eligible; ICC affiliate member				
(England) (Wales) (Scotland) (Republic of Ireland) (Netherlands) 1999	Not eligible; ICC affiliate member							Not eligible; ICC affiliate member				
(South Africa) (Zimbabwe) (Kenya) 2003	Not eligible; ICC affiliate member							Not eligible; ICC affiliate member				
(Cricket West Indies) 2007	Not eligible; ICC affiliate member							Not eligible; ICC affiliate member				
(India) (Sri Lanka) (Bangladesh) 2011	Did not qualify							7	0	6	0	1
(Australia) (New Zealand) 2015	Did not qualify							5	3	2	0	0
(England) (Wales) 2019	Did not qualify							26	17	9	0	0
(India) 2023	Did not qualify							15	3	11	0	1
(South Africa) (Zimbabwe) (Namibia) 2027	Did not qualify							Did not enter				
Total	—N/a	0/14	–	–	–	–	–	53	23	28	0	2

=== CWC Challenge League ===
Cricket World Cup Challenge League record
Year	League	Position	Pld	W	L	T	NR	P/R
2019–2022	A	6/6	15	3	11	0	1	▼
2024–2026	Did not qualify							
Total	0 Titles	1/2	15	3	11	0	1	—N/a

=== Men's T20 World Cup ===
Men's T20 World Cup record								Qualification record				
Year	Round	Position	Pld	W	L	T	NR	Pld	W	L	T	NR
(South Africa) 2007	Not eligible; no ODI status							Not eligible; no ODI status				
(England) 2009	Not eligible; no ODI status							Not eligible; no ODI status				
(Cricket West Indies) 2010	Not eligible; no ODI status							Not eligible; no ODI status				
(Sri Lanka) 2012	Did not qualify							6	3	3	0	0
(Bangladesh) 2014	Did not qualify							7	5	2	0	0
(India) 2016	Did not qualify							7	6	1	0	0
(United Arab Emirates) (Oman) 2021	Did not qualify							10	3	7	0	0
(Australia) 2022	Did not qualify							Regional qualifiers cancelled				
(United States) (Cricket West Indies) 2024	Did not qualify							12	7	5	0	0
(India) (Sri Lanka) 2026	Did not qualify							6	1	5	0	0
(Australia) (New Zealand) 2028	Did not qualify							6	2	4	0	0
Total	—N/a	0/11	–	–	–	–	–	54	27	27	0	0

=== T20 World Cup EAP Regional Final ===
T20 World Cup EAP Regional Final record
Year	Round	Position	Pld	W	L	T	NR	Qual.
(Papua New Guinea) 2019	Round-robin	3/3	4	1	3	0	0	DNQ
(Japan) 2023	Tournament cancelled							
(Papua New Guinea) 2023	Round-robin	3/4	6	2	4	0	0	DNQ
(Oman) 2025	Did not qualify							
(To be determined) 2027	Did not qualify							
Total	0 Titles	2/5	10	3	7	0	0	—N/a

=== Pacific Games ===
Pacific Games record
Year	Round	Position	Pld	W	L	T	NR
(New Caledonia) 1979	Round-robin	?/5	Records not available				
(Fiji) 1979	Silver medal	2/7	Records not available				
(Papua New Guinea) 1991	Round-robin	?/5	Records not available				
(Fiji) 2003	First round	5/6	5	1	4	0	0
(Samoa) 2007	Did not participate						
(New Caledonia) 2011	Bronze medal	3/4	4	2	2	0	0
(Papua New Guinea) 2015	Gold medal	1/4	7	7	0	0	0
(Samoa) 2019	Silver medal	2/4	7	3	4	0	0
Total	1 Title	7/8	23	13	10	0	0

=== Other international tournaments ===
CWC Challenge League Play-off (List A)	World Cricket League (LA/ODI/50 overs)
2024: 5th place (DNQ)	2008 (Division Five): 12th place (▼); 2010 (Division Eight): 3rd place; 2012 (Division Eight): Winners (▲); 2013 (Division Seven): Runners-up (▲); 2013 (Division Six): 3rd place; 2015 (Division Six): Runners-up (▲, replaced Suriname); 2016 (Division Five): 4th place (▼); 2017 (Division Five): 2nd place (▲); 2018 (Division Four): 5th place (▼)

=== Other regional tournaments ===
T20WC EAP Sub-regional Qualifiers (T20I)	EAP Trophy (50 overs/T20I)
2018: Runners-up (Q); 2022: Winners (Q); 2024: 4th place (DNQ); 2026: 5th place (DNQ)	2005: 3rd place; 2007: Runners-up; 2009 (Division Two): Winners; 2009: 5th place; 2013: Runners-up; 2014: Runners-up
Pacific Island Cricket Challenge	Pacifica Cup
2023: Silver medal	2001: 7th place; 2002: 6th place

== Current Squad ==
This lists all the players who have played for Vanuatu in the past 12 months or has been part of the latest T20I squad.

Updated as of 5 May 2026

Name	Age	Batting style	Bowling style	Last T20I	Notes
Batters
Junior Kaltapau	27	Right-handed	Right-arm off break	(Papua New Guinea) 2026	
Andrew Mansale	38	Right-handed	Right-arm off break	(Papua New Guinea) 2026	
Rodrick Lekai	19	Right-handed	Right-arm off break	(Papua New Guinea) 2026	
Womejo Wotu	22	Left-handed	Right-arm fast medium	(Papua New Guinea) 2026	
All-rounders
Tim Cutler	44	Right-handed	Slow left-arm orthodox	(Papua New Guinea) 2026	
Patrick Matautaava	35	Right-handed	Right-arm medium	(Papua New Guinea) 2026	
Nalin Nipiko	31	Right-handed	Right-arm medium	(Papua New Guinea) 2026	
Joshua Rasu	32	Right-handed	Right-arm fast-medium	(Papua New Guinea) 2026	Captain
Wicket-keepers
Jarryd Allan	35	Right-handed	—N/a	(Samoa) 2026	
Clement Tommy	29	Right-handed	—N/a	(Papua New Guinea) 2026	
Ala Viraliliu	24	Right-handed	—N/a	(Papua New Guinea) 2026	
Spin Bowlers
Williamsing Nalisa	26	Right-handed	Right-arm leg break	(Indonesia) 2026	
Pace Bowlers
Nicholas Venables	43	Left-handed	Left-arm medium fast	(Papua New Guinea) 2026	
Darren Wotu	28	Right-handed	Right-arm medium	(Indonesia) 2026	

== Records and statistics ==
International Match Summary — Vanuatu

Last updated 17 May 2026

Playing Record
Format	M	W	L	T	NR	Inaugural Match
Twenty20 Internationals	46	19	27	0	0	22 March 2019

=== Twenty20 International ===
- Highest team total: 223/5 v Fiji, on 16 March 2023 at Albert Park Ground 1, Suva.
- Highest individual score: 103, Patrick Matautaava v Malaysia, 2 October 2019 at Kinrara Academy Oval, Kuala Lumpur.
- Best bowling figures in an innings: 6/16, Williamsing Nalisa v Fiji, on 19 August 2024 at Faleata Oval 2, Apia.

Most T20I runs for Vanuatu

Player	Runs	Average	Career span
Nalin Nipiko	1,086	28.57	2019–2026
Joshua Rasu	818	20.45	2019–2026
Andrew Mansale	808	23.08	2019–2026
Patrick Matautaava	520	16.77	2019–2024
Junior Kaltapau	497	21.60	2022–2026

Most T20I wickets for Vanuatu

Player	Wickets	Average	Career span
Nalin Nipiko	50	16.18	2019–2026
Joshua Rasu	50	16.06	2019–2026
Patrick Matautaava	38	16.31	2019–2026
Williamsing Nalisa	31	23.67	2019–2026
Simpson Obed	19	15.10	2019–2023

T20I record versus other nations

Records complete to T20I #3877. Last updated 17 May 2026.

Opponent	M	W	L	T	NR	First match	First win
vs Associate Members
Bahrain	1	0	1	0	0	10 March 2024	
Cook Islands	5	1	4	0	0	11 September 2022	15 September 2022
Fiji	7	6	1	0	0	9 September 2022	9 September 2022
Indonesia	1	1	0	0	0	16 May 2026	16 May 2026
Japan	3	1	2	0	0	23 July 2023	28 July 2023
Kuwait	2	0	2	0	0	7 March 2024	
Malaysia	6	3	3	0	0	29 September 2019	29 September 2019
Papua New Guinea	8	0	8	0	0	22 March 2019	
Philippines	4	2	2	0	0	23 March 2019	23 March 2019
Samoa	8	4	4	0	0	9 July 2019	12 July 2019
Tanzania	1	1	0	0	0	5 March 2024	5 March 2024

== Coaching history ==
- 2014–2019: (Australia) Shane Deitz (playing coach from 2018)
- 2019–2020: (Australia) Clint McKay (acting)
- 2020: (Australia) Simon Keen
- 2021–2022: (Australia) Jeremy Bray
- 2022: (Vanuatu) Eddie Mansale (acting)
- 2022–2023: (Australia) Ben Cameron
- 2023–present: (Australia) Chris Laffan

== See also ==
- List of Vanuatu Twenty20 International cricketers
- Vanuatu women's national cricket team
