= Fiji national cricket team =

Fiji
- Association: Cricket Fiji

Personnel
- Captain: Peni Vuniwaqa
- Coach: Jone Seuvou

History
- First-class debut: v Auckland at Auckland Domain; 25 January 1895

International Cricket Council
- ICC status: Associate member (1965)
- ICC region: East Asia-Pacific
ICC Rankings	Current	Best-ever
T20I	93rd	48th (12 May 2019)

International cricket
- First international: v Australia at Suva, Fiji; 27 March 1905

One Day Internationals
- World Cup Qualifier appearances: 7 (first in 1979)
- Best result: 11th place (1997)

T20 Internationals
- First T20I: v Vanuatu at Independence Park, Port Vila; 9 September 2022
- Last T20I: v Philippines at Sano International Cricket Ground 2, Sano; 18 May 2026
T20Is	Played	Won/Lost
Total	22	8/14 (0 ties, 0 no results)
This year	6	0/6 (0 ties, 0 no results)
T20I kit
- As of 26 May 2026

The Fiji national cricket team is the men's team that represents Fiji in international cricket. Fiji has been an associate member of the International Cricket Council (ICC) since 1965, although the team's history goes back to the late 19th century.

In April 2018, the ICC decided to grant full Twenty20 International (T20I) status to all its members. Therefore, all Twenty20 matches played between Fiji and other ICC members since 1 January 2019 have the T20I status.

== History ==
=== Early days ===
Cricket was introduced to Fiji by European settlers in 1874, and the native population began taking up the game in 1878. The governor of Fiji at the time listed introducing cricket to the native Fijians as one of the achievements of his tenure in his memoirs.

=== Early tours ===
Fiji was playing first-class cricket just 21 years after cricket was introduced to the country, when they toured New Zealand in early 1895.

==== 1895 tour of New Zealand ====
Fiji's team on the tour in 1895 was captained by John Udal, whose great-grandson Shaun would eventually play Test cricket for England. The first match of the tour was a two-day match against Auckland, which Fiji lost by an innings.

A low scoring second match against Otago was drawn after rain washed out the first of the two days. The third match against Canterbury was also lost by an innings, before a draw against Wellington.

The final two matches of the tour went much better for the Fijians, winning against Hawke's Bay by an innings after a century from John Collins, and beating Taranaki by two wickets.

==== 1907–08 tour of Australia ====
In 1907–08, Fiji toured Australia, playing 26 matches against state, university and district sides between 11 December 1907 and 30 March 1908. In the drawn two-day match against Queensland, Pope Cakobau took 7 for 105 and 3 for 56. The Fijian team also played a two-day match against New South Wales and two against Victoria. All four of these matches were drawn.

==== 1923–24 New Zealand tour of Fiji ====
A New Zealand team captained by Walter Harvie, and consisting mostly of players from Auckland, toured Fiji in March and April 1924, playing five matches, including two three-day matches against Fiji. None of the matches were first-class.

==== 1935–36 New Zealand tour of Fiji ====
A young New Zealand team captained by Bruce Massey, known as the Maorilanders, toured Fiji in December 1935 and January 1936, playing nine matches, including two three-day matches against Fiji. None of the matches were first-class.

=== Post War period ===
Fiji toured New Zealand twice more, in 1948 and 1954. Fiji's first match against a Test-playing nation came in 1956, when the West Indies visited. Fiji won the match against a team featuring the likes of Garfield Sobers by 28 runs despite being bowled out for 91, largely thanks to a six wicket haul from John Gosling.

==== 1948 tour of New Zealand ====
Like the tour in 1895, the 1948 tour started with a defeat to Auckland, by 168 runs. Fiji won their next match against Wellington by one wicket, before losing to Canterbury by 36 runs.

The tour continued with a 46 run defeat by Otago and concluded with a 115 run win against Auckland. One notable player for Fiji on this tour was IL Bula, who scored the most runs and the only century on the tour. Bula's full name is Ilikena Lasarusa Talebulamainavaleniveivakabulaimainakulalakebalau, and his name is thought to be the longest of any first class cricketer.

==== 1954 tour of New Zealand ====
Just four matches were played on the 1954 tour, which started with a two wicket defeat to Otago. The tour continued with another two wicket defeat, this time to Canterbury, before a 117 run defeat to Wellington. The tour ended with a seven wicket win against Auckland. The team included Ratu Kamisese Mara who would go on to become the Prime Minister and President of Fiji.

==== 1983–84 England visit to Fiji ====
An England XI played two limited-over matches against the Fiji Cricket Association President's XI in 1984. Basically this was the full England squad of the day on its way to tour New Zealand. The England side won both matches although they were given a serious scare in the second, the Fijian side losing by only 18 runs.

=== ICC membership ===
Fiji gained associate membership of the ICC in 1965. They played in the first ICC Trophy tournament in 1979, and played in every one until 2001. They also played in the first ACC Trophy in 1996, losing in the semi-final to the UAE.

In 2001, Fiji played in the first Pacifica Cup in Auckland, reaching the final where they lost to the New Zealand Māori by three wickets. They played in the 2002 tournament in Samoa, finishing third after beating the Cook Islands in a play-off.

In 2003, Fiji hosted the South Pacific Games. The cricket tournament saw the hosts lose to Papua New Guinea in the final. The following year, they took part in the EAP Challenge in Fuji City, Japan, winning after beating Tonga in the final. This qualified them for the repêchage tournament for the 2005 ICC Trophy. At that tournament in Kuala Lumpur, Malaysia, they reached the final, where they lost to Papua New Guinea by 30 runs, thus missing out on the 2005 ICC Trophy.

In 2006, Fiji played in the 2006 ICC EAP Cricket Trophy in Brisbane, Australia. They won the tournament winning all of their matches against the Cook Islands and Japan, qualifying them for Division Three of the World Cricket League in Darwin, Australia. They warmed up for the tournament with a three match series at home against Vanuatu, winning all three matches, but were unsuccessful in the tournament itself, losing all five games they played, thus meaning they will have to take part in Division Four in 2008.

Later in 2007, they took part in the cricket tournament at the 2007 South Pacific Games, losing to Papua New Guinea in the final group game, meaning that they went home with the silver medal.

Fiji took part in the 2010 ICC World Cricket League Division Five in Nepal, where they finished sixth and last and in doing so failed to win a single match in the tournament. Fiji then played in the 2011 ICC World Cricket League Division Six and finished sixth and last and in doing so were relegated to 2013 ICC World Cricket League Division Seven.

== Tournament history ==
=== World Cricket League ===
- 2007: Division Three – 8th place
- 2008: Division Four – 5th place
- 2010: Division Five – 6th place
- 2011: Division Six – 6th place
- 2013: Division Seven – 3rd place
- 2015: Division Six – 5th place

=== ICC Trophy ===
- 1979: First round
- 1982: First round
- 1986: First round
- 1990: Plate competition
- 1994: Plate competition
- 1997: 11th place
- 2001: First round
- 2005: Did not qualify

=== ACC Trophy ===
- 1996: Semi-finals

=== South Pacific Games ===
- 1979: Bronze medal
- 1987: Silver medal
- 1991: Silver medal
- 2003: Silver medal
- 2007: Silver medal
- 2011: Silver medal

=== ICC T20 World Cup East Asia-Pacific Qualifier ===
- 2018-19: 4th place (Group A Subregional Qualifier)
- 2022-23: 2nd place (Group A Subregional Qualifier)

== Records ==
International Match Summary — Fiji

Last updated 18 May 2026

Playing Record
Format	M	W	L	T	NR	Inaugural Match
Twenty20 Internationals	22	8	14	0	0	9 September 2022

=== Twenty20 International ===
T20I record versus other nations

Records complete to T20I #3884. Last updated 18 May 2026.

Opponent	M	W	L	T	NR	First match	First win
vs Associate Members
Cook Islands	4	3	1	0	0	10 September 2022	10 September 2022
Japan	1	0	1	0	0	10 May 2026	
Philippines	2	0	2	0	0	14 May 2026	
Samoa	6	4	2	0	0	11 September 2022	11 September 2022
South Korea	2	0	2	0	0	13 May 2026	
Vanuatu	7	1	6	0	0	9 September 2022	23 August 2024

=== Other records ===
For a list of selected international matches played by Fiji, see Cricket Archive.

== Players ==
Fiji's most famous player is Neil Maxwell, who played first-class cricket for New South Wales and Victoria in Australia, and for Canterbury in New Zealand in addition to representing Australia A. Nat Uluiviti is the other Fijian to have played first-class cricket for a team other than Fiji, playing for Auckland in the 1950s.

=== Current squad ===
The Fiji squad at the 2015 ICC World Cricket League Division Six tournament was as follows:

- Josefa Rika (c)
- Metuisela Beitaki
- Sakiusa Dokosobau
- Imran Khan
- Riyad Khan
- Jikoi Kida
- Karan Kumar
- Kunaal Kumar
- Rabici Lesuma
- Viliame Manakitoga
- Sekove Ravoka
- Giles Smith
- Jone Wesele
- Viliame Yabaki

== See also ==
- List of Fiji Twenty20 International cricketers
- Fiji women's national cricket team
