= Tonga national cricket team =

Cricket Tonga
Personnel
- Captain: Jimmy McClory
- Coach: Ivan Taakimoeaka

International Cricket Council
- ICC status: Non-member (2000)
- ICC region: East Asia-Pacific

The Tonga national cricket team (Tongan: timi kilikiti fakafonua ʻa Tonga) represents the Kingdom of Tonga in international cricket. They became an affiliate member of the International Cricket Council in 2000. They were removed as an affiliate member in June 2014, over their failure to comply with membership requirements and in 2022 a new Tonga international cricket association from Sydney was formed which is working with governing bodies in Tonga to develop skills for both countries Tongan heritage players and soon they will play in the East Asia Pacific Cup again.

== International competition ==
Tonga has taken part in four international tournaments between 2001 and 2005. In 2000 and 2001, they took part in the Pacifica Championship, finishing fourth in 2000, and as runners up in 2001. Their 2001 performance qualified them for the East Asia/Pacific Challenge tournament in 2004, a tournament that formed part of the qualification process for the 2007 World Cup. They lost to Fiji in the final of that tournament, just missing out on progressing to the next stage of qualification. In 2005, they set out on the road to qualification for the 2011 World Cup, playing in the East Asia/Pacific Cricket Cup, they finished fourth in the tournament, ending their hopes of qualification for the World Cup. From 2022 we have a new Tonga international cricket association from Sydney which is working with governing bodies of cricket in Tonga and working alongside them to develop skills in grassroots and domestic level for both country players, and Tonga heritage players in Australia have been part of this team and soon they will play in the East Asia-Pacific Cup again.

=== Matches ===
Below is a record of international matches played in the one-day format by Tonga between 2001 and 2009.

Opponent	M	W	L	T	NR
Cook Islands	5	1	4	0	0
Fiji	4	0	4	0	0
Indonesia	4	1	3	0	0
Japan	3	0	3	0	0
Papua New Guinea	3	0	3	0	0
Samoa	5	0	5	0	0
Vanuatu	6	0	6	0	0
Total	30	2	25	0	0
