= 2008 Under-19 Cricket World Cup squads =

The following players were selected to play in the 2008 Under-19 Cricket World Cup.

== Australia ==
The following players were selected for Australia's squad:

- Michael Hill (C)
- Phillip Hughes (VC)
- Daniel Burns
- Michael Cranmer
- James Faulkner
- Josh Hazlewood
- David King
- Dom O'Brien (WK)
- Kirk Pascoe
- James Pattinson
- Clive Rose
- Kumar Sarna
- Jeremy Smith
- Steve Smith
- Marcus Stoinis

== Bangladesh ==
The following players were selected for Bangladesh's squad:

- Suhrawadi Shuvo (c)
- Amit Majumder
- Ashiqul Islam (wk)
- Ashraful Hossain
- Dolar Mahmud
- Golam Kibria
- Mahmudul Hasan
- Mohammad Mithun (wk)
- Mohammad Shakil
- Nadimuddin
- Nasir Hossain
- Rony Talukdar
- Rubel Hossain
- Shykat Ali
- Subashis Roy

== Bermuda ==
The following players were selected for Bermuda's squad:

- Rodney Trott (c)
- Malachi Jones (vc)
- Machai Campbell
- Deunte Darrell
- Jordan DeSilva
- Chris Douglas
- Terryn Fray
- Tre Govia
- Kyle Hodsoll
- Dennico Hollis
- Greg Maybury
- McLaren Smith
- Pierre Smith (wk)
- Regino Smith (wk)
- Tamauri Tucker

== England ==
The following players were selected for England's squad:

- Alex Wakely (c)
- Ben Brown (wk)
- Liam Dawson
- Steven Finn
- Billy Godleman
- James Goodman
- James Harris
- James Lee
- Stuart Meaker
- Sam Northeast
- Dan Redfern
- James Taylor
- Tom Westley
- Chris Woakes
- Greg Wood (wk)

== India ==
The following players were selected for India's squad:

- Virat Kohli (c)
- Ravindra Jadeja (VC)
- Ajitesh Argal
- Napoleon Einstein
- Shreevats Goswami (wk)
- Perry Goyal (wk)
- Iqbal Abdulla
- Siddarth Kaul
- Taruwar Kohli
- Abhinav Mukund
- Manish Pandey
- Pradeep Sangwan
- Duvvarapu Siva Kumar
- Tanmay Srivastava
- Saurabh Tiwary

== Ireland ==
The following players were selected for Ireland's squad:

- Andy Balbirnie (wk) (c)
- Ben Ackland
- Andrew Britton
- Chris Dougherty
- Shane Getkate
- James Hall
- Richard Keaveney
- Theo Lawson
- Gavin McKenna
- Graham McDonnell
- Lee Nelson
- Stuart Poynter (wk)
- James Shannon
- Paul Stirling

== Malaysia ==
The following players were selected for Malaysia's squad:

- Ahmad Faiz (c)
- Faris Almas (vc)
- Sarath Ananthasivam
- Faizal Abu Hasan
- Fauzi Arifin
- Kasman Kaderi
- Mohammad Miran
- Nik Arifin
- Norwira Zazmie
- Aminuddin Ramly
- Saravanan Raj
- Shafiq Sharif (wk)
- Shahid Ali Khan
- Suharril Fetri

== Namibia ==
The following players were selected for Namibia's squad:

- Dawid Botha (c)
- Claude Bouwer
- Gert Jan Coetzee
- Morne Engelbrecht
- Tiaan Louw
- Elandre Oosthuizen
- Bernard Scholtz (wk)
- Sean Silver
- Ewald Steenkamp
- Keady Strauss
- Louis van der Westhuizen
- Martin van Niekerk
- Ashley van Rooi
- Raymond van Schoor
- Pikky Ya France

== Nepal ==
The following players were selected for Nepal's squad:

- Paras Khadka (c)
- Gyanendra Malla (vc)
- Amrit Bhattarai
- Mahesh Chhetri
- Akash Gupta
- Sagar Khadka
- Anil Mandal
- Subash Pradhan (wk)
- Abhaya Rana
- Chandra Sawad
- Raj Shrestha
- Rom Shrestha
- Antim Thapa
- Puspa Thapa
- Rahul Vishwakarma

== New Zealand ==
The following players were selected for New Zealand's squad:

- Kane Williamson (c)
- Corey Anderson
- Nick Beard
- Harry Boam
- Trent Boult
- Michael Bracewell
- Tamati Clarke
- Fraser Colson
- Andrew Dodd
- Michael Guptill-Bunce (wk)
- Greg Morgan
- Hamish Rutherford
- Tim Southee
- Anurag Verma
- George Worker

== Pakistan ==
The following players were selected for Pakistan's squad:

- Imad Wasim (c)
- Shan Masood (vc)
- Adil Raza
- Ahmed Shehzad
- Ahsan Jamil
- Ali Asad
- Azhar Attari
- Junaid Khan
- Kamran Hussain
- Mohammad Rameez
- Shahzaib Ahmed
- Umair Mir (wk)
- Umar Akmal
- Umar Amin
- Usman Salahuddin

== Papua New Guinea ==
The following players were selected for Papua New Guinea's squad:

- Colin Amini (c)
- Alfred Amini
- Charles Amini
- Jonathan Diho
- Arua Dikana
- Willie Gavera
- Tanti Heni
- Jason Kila
- Jacob Mado
- Loa Nou
- John Reva
- Heni Siaka
- Joel Tom
- Tony Ura
- Archie Vala

== South Africa ==
The following players were selected for South Africa's squad:

- Wayne Parnell (c)
- Roy Adams
- Matthew Arnold
- Clayton August
- Bradley Barnes (wk)
- Daniel Childs
- Sybrand Engelbrecht
- Reeza Hendricks
- Pieter Malan
- Mangaliso Mosehle (wk)
- Obus Pienaar
- Rilee Rossouw
- JJ Smuts
- Yaseen Vallie
- Jonathan Vandiar

== Sri Lanka ==
The following players were selected for Sri Lanka's squad:

- Ashan Priyanjan (c)
- Dinesh Chandimal (wk)
- Denuwan Fernando
- Ishan Jayaratne
- Umesh Karunaratne
- Navin Kavikara
- Dilshan Munaweera
- Sachith Pathirana
- Chathura Peiris
- Angelo Perera
- Kusal Perera
- Thisara Perera
- Roshen Silva
- Lahiru Thirimanne
- Imesh Udayanga

== West Indies ==
The following players were selected for the West Indie's squad:

- Shamarh Brooks (c)
- Steven Jacobs (vc)
- Adrian Barath
- Nkrumah Bonner
- Darren Bravo
- Kyle Corbin
- Andre Creary
- Jason Dawes
- Dawnley Grant
- Delorn Johnson
- Horace Miller
- Veerasammy Permaul
- Kieran Powell
- Devon Thomas (wk)
- Shacaya Thomas

== Zimbabwe ==
The following players were selected for Zimbabwe's squad:

- Prince Masvaure (c)
- Justin Gaisford
- Tinashe Chimbambo (wk)
- Tendai Chitongo
- Hughes Dinembira
- Kyle Jarvis
- Edzai Jaure
- Daniel Landman
- Tendai Mashonganyika
- Stewart Matsika
- Solomon Mire
- Peter Moor
- Tinotenda Mutombodzi
- Njabulo Ncube
- Reginald Nehonde
