= Yabaki =

Yabaki is a surname. Notable people with the surname include:

- Akuila Yabaki, Fijian activist and clergyman
- Konisi Yabaki (died 2018), Fijian politician
- Viliame Yabaki (born 1991), Fijian cricketer

== See also ==
- Yabakei
