= Roy Adams =

Roy Adams may refer to:

- Roy Adams (cricketer) (born 1989), South African first-class cricketer
- Roy Adams (writer), American-Canadian academic, author, adventurer, labour rights activist and poet
- Roy Daryl Adams, American politician and businessman serving as a member of the Louisiana House of Representatives from the 62nd district
