= 2009 ICC EAP Cricket Trophy (One day) =

2009 ICC EAP Trophy
- Administrator: EAP
- Cricket format: List A
- Tournament format: Group Stage with Finals
- Host: Samoa
- Champions: Div 1: Papua New Guinea (1st title); Div 2: Vanuatu (1st title)
- Participants: 8 teams
- Matches: 36

The 2009 East Asia-Pacific Trophy was an international cricket tournament played in ODI format at Apia, Samoa between 19 and 25 September 2009. Eight men's national teams participated in the tournament which was split into two divisions; the three nations from the World Cricket League played in division one, and the remaining five nations played in division two.

In the division one competition, after a round robin group stage of four matches, Papua New Guinea easily beat Fiji in the final.

In the division two competition, after a round robin group stage of four matches, Vanuatu easily beat the Samoa in the final. As a result of winning the tournament, Vanuatu earned promotion to both Division Eight of the World Cricket League and Division One of the EAP Trophy.

== Teams ==
Division 1

- Fiji
- Japan
- Papua New Guinea

Division 2

- Cook Islands
- Indonesia
- Samoa
- Tonga
- Vanuatu

== Group stages ==
=== Division 1 ===
Papua New Guinea was undefeated after the round-robin stage.

Team	Pts	Pld	W	L	NRR
Papua New Guinea	8	4	4	0	2.612
Fiji	4	4	2	2	0.022
Japan	0	4	0	4	-3.842

=== Division 2 ===
Vanuatu was undefeated after the round-robin stage.

Team	Pts	Pld	W	L	NRR
Vanuatu	8	4	4	0	2.586
Samoa	6	4	3	1	0.351
Cook Islands	4	4	2	2	-0.259
Tonga	2	4	1	3	-0.198
Indonesia	0	4	0	4	-3.311

== Play-offs ==
There were four play-off matches to decide the final standings.

=== Interdivisional match ===
25 September 2009

Japan	v	Indonesia

Faleata Oval No 4, Apia

=== 3rd place play-off (Div 2) ===
25 September 2009
Scorecard

Cook Islands; 180 (50 overs)	v	Tonga; 123 (27.5 overs)

Cook Islands won by 57 runs
Faleata Oval No 2, Apia

- Cook Islands won the toss and decided to bat

=== Final (Div 2) ===
25 September 2009
Scorecard

Samoa; 175 (42.2 overs)	v	Vanuatu; 300 (50 overs)

Vanuatu won by 125 runs
Faleata Oval No 1, Apia

- Vanuatu won the toss and decided to bat

=== Final (Div 1) ===
25 September 2009
Scorecard

Papua New Guinea; 247 (50 overs)	v	Fiji; 129 (35.2 overs)

Papua New Guinea won by 118 runs
Faleata Oval No 3, Apia

- Papua New Guinea won the toss and decided to bat

== Final standings ==
=== Division 1 ===
Pos	Team	Promotion
1st	Papua New Guinea	Remain in Division One
2nd	Fiji	Remain in Division One
3rd	Japan	Remain in Division One

=== Division 2 ===
Pos	Team	Promotion
1st	Vanuatu	Promoted to 2010 ICC WCL Division Eight & 2011 ICC EAP Trophy Division 1
2nd	Samoa	Remain in Division Two
3rd	Cook Islands	Remain in Division Two
4th	Tonga	Remain in Division Two
5th	Indonesia	Remain in Division Two

== See also ==
- International cricket in 2009
