= 2011 EAP Twenty20 Division One =

2011 ICC EAP Trophy Division 1
- Administrator: EAP
- Cricket format: Twenty20
- Tournament format: Group Stage with Finals
- Host: Papua New Guinea
- Participants: 5
- Matches: 15
- Player of the series: (Papua New Guinea) Tony Ura
- Most runs: (Papua New Guinea) Assad Vala (372)
- Most wickets: (Fiji) Inaiasi Cakacaka (9) (Papua New Guinea) Joel Tom (9) (Vanuatu) Patrick Matautaava (9) (Papua New Guinea) Jason Kila (9)

The 2011 ICC EAP Trophy Division 1 was played between 4–7 July 2011 in Port Moresby, Papua New Guinea. The tournament was a Twenty20 competition with the winner promoted to the 2012 ICC World Twenty20 Qualifier in the United Arab Emirates.

== Squads ==
Fiji	Japan	Papua New Guinea	Samoa	Vanuatu
Josefa Rika (c); Joji Bulabalavu; Iniasi Cakacaka; Josefa Dabea; Maciu Gauna (wk); Jikoi Kida; Sakaraia Lomani; Mohammad Kahn; Vilikesa Nailolo; Sekove Ravoka; Tasheed Tawheed; Kitiano Tavo; Waisake Tukana; Viliame Yabaki	Tatsuro Chino (c) (wk); Takuro Hagihara; Hanif Kahn Muhammad; Ko Irie; Raheel Kano; Masaomi Kobayashi; Naotsune Miyaji; Naoki Miyaji; Qureshi Naeemuddin; Kazuyuki Ogawa; Tomoki Ota; Cheema Razaq; Jarrad Shearer; Fumihiki Uegaki	Rarva Dikana (c); Charles Amini; Chris Amini; Hitolo Areni; Sese Bau; Mahuru Dai; Willie Gavera; Jason Kila; Vani Morea; John Reva; Joel Tom; Tony Ura; Assad Vala; Jack Vare (wk)	Geoff Clarke (c); Murphy Sua; Tiafala Alatasi; Sean Cotter; Faavae Faaofo; Loutala Fuinaomo; Uilisone Kaisara; Uala Kaisara (wk); Lesuni Luteru; Benjamin Mailata; Winston Mariner; Faasao Mulivai; Pritchard Pritchard; naa Vaasili	Andrew Mansale (c); Lazoro Carlot; Jelany Chilia; Aby John; Kendy Kenneth; Trevor Langa (wk); Edy Mansale; Patrick Matautaava; Lenica Natapei; Manu Nimoho; Nalin Nipiko; Simpson Obed; Kenny Tari; niko Unavalu

== Group stage ==
=== Points table ===
Team	Mat	W	L	T	N/R	Pts	NRR
Papua New Guinea	4	4	0	0	0	8	+3.813
Fiji	4	2	2	0	0	4	+0.793
Vanuatu	4	2	2	0	0	4	–0.338
Samoa	4	2	2	0	0	4	–0.904
Japan	4	0	4	0	0	0	–3.566

=== Matches ===
4 July
10.15 a.m.
Scorecard

Fiji; 125/8 (20 overs)	v	Samoa; 126/7 (19.5 overs)
Josefa Rika 33 (39); Winston Mariner 3/21 (4 overs)		Benjamin Mailata 52; Iniasi Cakacaka 3/18 (4 overs)

Samoa won by 3 wickets
Colts Cricket Ground, Port Moresby
Umpires: Geoff Clelland (Van) and Grant Johnston (Van)

- Samoa won the toss and elected to field.

4 July
10.15 a.m.
Scorecard

Papua New Guinea; 150/6 (20 overs)	v	Vanuatu; 112/8 (20 overs)
Tony Ura 73 (55); Patrick Matautaava 3/18 (4 overs)		Edy Mansale 30 (36); Joel Tom 2/15 (4 overs)

Papua New Guinea won by 38 runs
Amini Park, Port Moresby
Umpires: Nail Harrison (Jpn) and Bruce Oxenford (Aus)

- Papua New Guinea won the toss and elected to bat.

4 July
2.15 p.m.
Scorecard

Fiji; 160/2 (20 overs)	v	Japan; 86/7 (20 overs)
Kitiano Tavo 45* (25); Naotsune Miyaji 2/35 (4 overs)		Kazuyuki Ogawa 17 (10); Waisake Tukana 2/12 (3 overs)

Fiji won by 74 runs
Amini Park, Port Moresby
Umpires: Geoff Clelland (Van) and Lakani Oala (PNG)

- Fiji won the toss and elected to bat.

4 July
2.15 p.m.
Scorecard

Papua New Guinea; 182/6 (20 overs)	v	Samoa; 105/9 (20 overs)
Tony Ura 69 (37); Faasao Mulivai 2/22 (4 overs)		Uala Kaisara 29* (32); Jason Kila 2/11 (4 overs)

Papua New Guinea won by 77 runs
Colts Cricket Ground, Port Moresby
Umpires: Grant Johnston (Van) and Bruce Oxenford (Aus)

- Papua New Guinea won the toss and elected to bat.

5 July
10.00 a.m.
Scorecard

Japan; 109/7 (20 overs)	v	Vanuatu; 113/4 (13.5 overs)
Naoki Miyaji 25*; Manu Nimoho 2/18 (2 overs)		Lazaro Carlot 44; Masaomi Kobayashi 3/27 (4 overs)

Vanuatu won by 6 wickets
Colts Cricket Ground, Vanuatu
Umpires: Grant Johnston (Van) and Bruce Oxenford (Aus)

- Japan won the toss and elected to bat.

5 July
10.00 a.m.
Scorecard

Papua New Guinea; 152/9 (20 overs)	v	Fiji; 108 (18 overs)
Mahuru Dai 61 (33); Vilikesa Nailolo 3/13 (2 overs)		Iniasi Cakacaka 38 (29); Jason Kila 4/17 (4 overs)

Papua New Guinea won by 44 runs
Amini Park, Port Moresby
Umpires: Geoff Clelland (Van) and Neil Harrison (Jpn)

- Papua New Guinea won the toss and elected to bat.

5 July
2.00 p.m.
Scorecard

Papua New Guinea; 225/3 (20 overs)	v	Japan; 79/8 (20 overs)
Assad Vala 116 (59); Naoki Miyaji 2/53 (4 overs)		Ko Irie 19 (35); John Reva 3/20 (4 overs)

Papua New Guinea won by 146 runs
Colts Cricket Ground, Port Moresby
Umpires: Geoff Clelland (Van) and Bruce Oxenford (Aus)

- Papua New Guinea won the toss and elected to bat.

5 July
2.00 p.m.
Scorecard

Vanuatu; 185/3 (20 overs)	v	Samoa; 180/5 (20 overs)
Andrew Mansale 85* (55); Loutala Fuinaomo 1/29 (4 overs)		Benjamin Mailata 98* (51); Andrew Mansale 2/23 (4 overs)

Vanuatu won by 5 runs
Amini Park, Port Moresby
Umpires: Neil Harrison (Jpn) and Lakani Oala (PNG)

- Vanuatu won the toss and elected to bat.

6 July
10.00 a.m.
Scorecard

Vanuatu; 73 (16.5 overs)	v	Fiji; 77/4 (15 overs)
Kendy Kenneth 16 (14); Viliame Yabaki 2/0 (0.5 overs)		Joji Bulabalavu 21 (27); Andrew Mansale 2/9 (4 overs)

Fiji won by 6 wickets
Colts Cricket Ground, Port Moresby
Umpires: Lakani Oala (PNG) and Bruce Oxenford (Aus)

- Vanuatu won the toss and elected to bat.

6 July
10.00 a.m.
Scorecard

Japan; 123/3 (20 overs)	v	Samoa; 126/4 (19.2 overs)
Jarrad Shearer 44* (35); Naa Vaasili 1/25 (4 overs)		Sean Cotter 41 (47); Kazuyuki Ogawa 1/27 (4 overs)

Samoa won by 6 wickets
Amini Park, Port Moresby
Umpires: Neil Harrison (Jpn) and Grant Johnston (Van)

- Japan won the toss and elected to bat.

== Play-offs ==
=== 1st Semi-Final ===
6 July
2.00 p.m.
Scorecard

Papua New Guinea; 234/5 (20 overs)	v	Samoa; 93 (19.4 overs)
Tony Ura 102 (53); Faasao Mulivai 3/36 (4 overs)		Sean Cotter 24 (20); Chris Maini 3/8 (3.4 overs)

Papua New Guinea won by 141 runs
Amini Park, Port Moresby
Umpires: Neil Harrison (Jpn) and Grant Johnston (Van)

- Papua New Guinew won the toss and elected to bat.

=== 2nd Semi-Final ===
6 July
2.00 p.m.
Scorecard

Vanuatu; 126/7 (20 overs)	v	Fiji; 91/7 (20 overs)
Andrew Mansale 42 (42); Mohammad Kahn 3/29 (4 overs)		Josefa Dabea 28 (33); Jelany Chilia 2/17 (4 overs)

Vanuatu won by 35 runs
Colts Cricket Ground, Port Moresby
Umpires: Lakani Oala (PNG) and Bruce Oxenford (Aus)

- Fiji won the toss and elected to field.

=== 3rd-place play-off ===
7 July
09.50 a.m.
Scorecard

Samoa; 172/3 (20 overs)	v	Fiji; 142 (18.2 overs)
Faasao Mulivai 67 (35); Viliame Yabaki 1/14 (2 overs)		Joji Bulabalavu 37 (23); Sean Cotter 3/9 (3 overs)

Samoa won by 30 runs
Amini Park, Port Moresby
Umpires: Geoff Clelland (Van) and Grant Johnston (Van)

- Fiji won the toss and elected to field.

=== Final ===
7 July
2.00 p.m.
Scorecard

Papua New Guinea; 195/5 (20 overs)	v	Vanuatu; 137/7 (20 overs)
Tony Ura 48 (32); Patrick Matautaava 2/41 (4 overs)		Simpson Obed 31 (23); Joel Tom 3/31 (4 overs)

Papua New Guinea won by 58 runs
Amini Park, Port Moresby
Umpires: Neil Harrison (Jpn) and Lakani Oala (PNG)

- Papua New Guinea won the toss and elected to bat.

== Final standings ==
Pos	Team	Promotion
1st	Papua New Guinea	Will take part in the 2012 ICC World Twenty20 Qualifier
2nd	Vanuatu	Will remain in Division One
3rd	Samoa	Will remain in Division One
4th	Fiji	Will remain in Division One
5th	Japan	Will remain in Division One

== Statistics ==
=== Highest team totals ===
The following table lists the six highest team scores.

Team	Total	Opponent	Ground
Papua New Guinea	234/5	Samoa	Amini Park, Port Moresby
Papua New Guinea	225/3	Japan	Colts Cricket Ground, Port Moresby
Papua New Guinea	195/5	Vanuatu	Amini Park, Port Moresby
Vanuatu	185/3	Samoa	Amini Park, Port Moresby
Papua New Guinea	182/6	Samoa	Colts Cricket Ground, Port Moresby
Samoa	180/5	Vanuatu	Amini Park, Port Moresby

=== Most runs ===
The top five highest run scorers (total runs) are included in this table.

Player	Team	Runs	Inns	Avg	HS	100s	50s	4s	6s
Assad Vala	Papua New Guinea	372	6	62.00	116	1	2	44	8
Tony Ura	Papua New Guinea	354	6	59.00	102	1	3	43	7
Benjamin Mailata	Samoa	195	6	39.00	98*	0	2	21	1
Simpson Obed	Vanuatu	149	6	24.83	71	0	1	16	7
Andrew Mansale	Vanuatu	144	6	28.80	85*	0	1	20	2

=== Highest scores ===
This table contains the top five highest scores made by a batsman in a single innings.

Player	Team	Score	Balls	4s	6s	Opponent	Ground
Assad Vala	Papua New Guinea	116	59	14	5	Japan	Colts Cricket Ground, Port Moresby
Tony Ura	Papua New Guinea	102	53	11	4	Samoa	Amini Park, Port Moresby
Benjamin Mailata	Samoa	98*	51	8	1	Vanuatu	Amini Park, Port Moresby
Assad Vala	Papua New Guinea	92	50	9	2	Samoa	Amini Park, Port Moresby
Andrew Mansale	Vanuatu	85*	55	10	2	Samoa	Amini Park, Port Moresby

=== Most wickets ===
The following table contains the five leading wicket-takers.

Player	Team	Wkts	Mts	Ave	S/R	Econ	BBI
Iniasi Cakacaka	Fiji	9	6	10.44	13.3	4.70	3/18
Joel Tom	Papua New Guinea	9	5	10.66	12.0	5.33	3/31
Patrick Matautaava	Vanuatu	9	6	19.44	15.3	7.60	3/18
Jason Kila	Papua New Guinea	9	6	11.87	14.2	5.00	4/14
Mahuru Dai	Papua New Guinea	8	6	14.00	14.2	5.89	2/14

=== Best bowling figures ===
This table lists the top five players with the best bowling figures.

Player	Team	Overs	Figures	Opponent	Ground
Jason Kila	Papua New Guinea	4.0	4/17	Fiji	Amini Park, Port Moresby
Chris Amini	Papua New Guinea	3.4	3/8	Samoa	Amini Park, Port Moresby
Sean Cotter	Samoa	3.0	3/9	Fiji	Amini Park, Port Moresby
Vilikesa Nailolo	Fiji	2.0	3/13	Papua New Guinea	Amini Park, Port Moresby
Patrick Matautaava	Vanuatu	4.0	3/18	Papua New Guinea	Amini Park, Port Moresby

== See also ==
- World Cricket League EAP region
- 2012 ICC World Twenty20 Qualifier
