= Priyanka Roy =

Indian cricketer (born 1988)

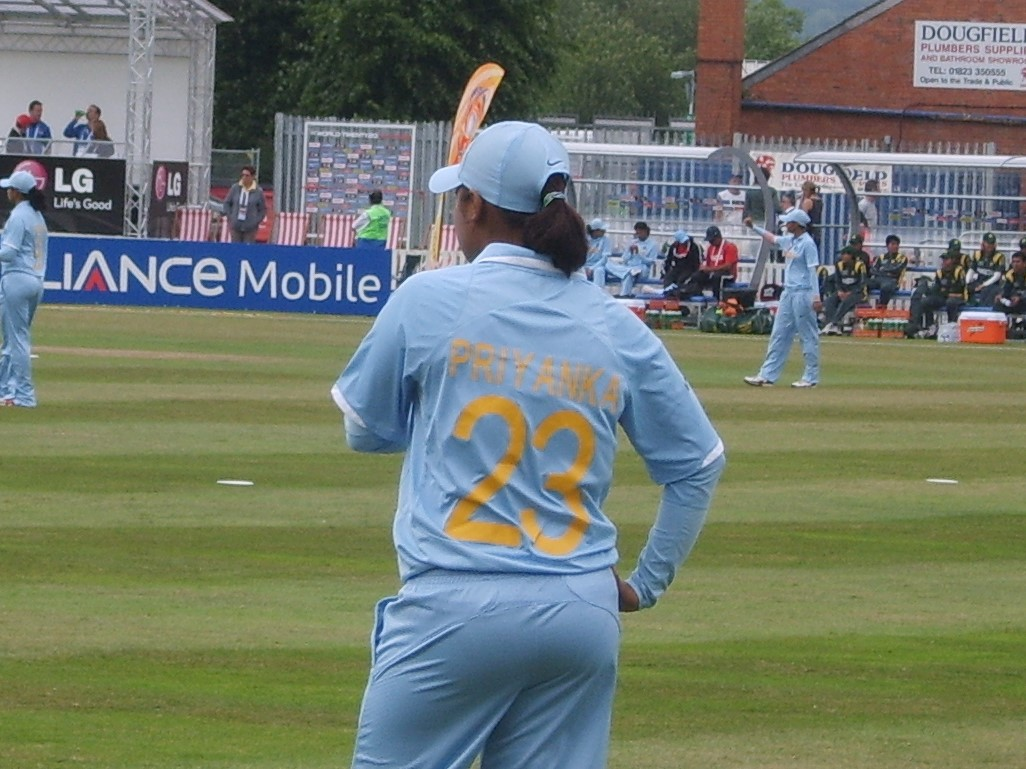

Personal information
- Born: 2 March 1988 (age 38); Calcutta, West Bengal, India
- Batting: Right-handed
- Bowling: Right-arm leg break
- Role: Batter

International information
- National side: India
- ODI debut (cap 86): 3 May 2008 v Sri Lanka
- Last ODI: 30 June 2011 v England
- T20I debut (cap 18): 11 June 2009 v England
- Last T20I: 27 June 2011 v New Zealand

Career statistics
Competition	ODI	T20I
Matches	27	15
Runs scored	333	95
Batting average	16.55	10.55
100s/50s	0/1	0/0
Top score	69*	22
Balls bowled	666	262
Wickets	19	21
Bowling average	22.57	12.47
5 wickets in innings	0	1
10 wickets in match	0	0
Best bowling	4/14	5/16
Catches/stumpings	8/–	3/–
- Source: ESPN Cricinfo, 11 January 2013

Priyanka Roy (born 2 March 1988) is an Indian cricketer.

A right-handed batter and leg break bowler, she played 27 One Day Internationals and 15 Twenty20 Internationals for the India national women's team. Her performances at the 2009 Women's Cricket World Cup saw her named in the ICC team of the tournament.
