= International cricket in 2009 =

International cricket in 2009 is defined as the season of international cricket between May and August 2009 in all cricket playing countries, as well as all international matches scheduled for the 2009 English cricket season. Matches between September 2008 and March 2009 are defined as belonging to the 2008–09 season, while matches between September 2009 and March 2010 will fall under the 2009–10 season.

== Season overview ==
International tours
Start date	Home team	Away team	Results [Matches]		
Start date	Home team	Away team	Test	ODI	T20I
22 April 2009	Pakistan	Australia	—	2–3 [5]	1–0 [1]
6 May 2009	England	West Indies	2–0 [2]	2–0 [3]	—
26 June 2009	West Indies	India	—	1–2 [4]	—
4 July 2009	Sri Lanka	Pakistan	2–0 [3]	3–2 [5]	0–1 [1]
8 July 2009	England	Australia	2–1 [5]	1–6 [7]	0–0 [2]
9 July 2009	West Indies	Bangladesh	0–2 [2]	0–3 [3]	1–0 [1]
9 August 2009	Zimbabwe	Bangladesh	—	1–4 [5]	—
18 August 2009	Sri Lanka	New Zealand	2–0 [2]	—	0–2 [2]
27 August 2009	Ireland	England	—	0–1 [1]	—
28 August 2009	Scotland	Australia	—	0–1 [1]	—
International tournaments
Start date	Tournament			Winners	
5 June 2009	(England) ICC World Twenty20			Pakistan	
8 September 2009	(Sri Lanka) Compaq Cup (Tri-Series)			India	
Minor tours
Start date	Home team	Away team	Results [Matches]		
Start date	Home team	Away team	First-class		ODI
2 July 2009	Scotland	Canada	1–0 [1]		1–1 [2]
3 July 2009	Ireland	Kenya	0–0 [1]		3–0 [3]
11 July 2009	Netherlands	Canada	0–0 [1]		1–0 [2]
14 August 2009	Canada	Kenya	0–1 [1]		1–0 [4]
14 August 2009	Zimbabwe	Afghanistan	0–0 [1]		—
17 August 2009	Scotland	Ireland	0–0 [1]		0–1 [2]
24 August 2009	Netherlands	Afghanistan	0–1 [1]		1–1 [2]
Minor tournaments
Start date	Tournament			Winners	
1 April 2009	(South Africa) ICC World Cup Qualifier			Ireland	
17 May 2009	(Guernsey) ICC World Cricket League Division Seven			Bahrain	
29 August 2009	(Singapore) ICC World Cricket League Division Six			Singapore	

== Pre-season rankings ==
ICC Test Championship 16 April 2009
Rank	Team	Matches	Points	Rating
1	Australia	37	4765	128
2	Sri Lanka	31	3875	125
3	South Africa	41	4951	121
4	India	38	4446	117
5	Pakistan	24	2197	92
6	England	52	4624	88
7	New Zealand	27	2164	80
8	West Indies	27	2090	77
9	Bangladesh	23	0	0
Reference: ICC Official Rankings List, 30 April 2009

ICC ODI Championship 20 April 2009
Rank	Team	Matches	Points	Rating
1	South Africa	34	4245	125
2	Australia	37	4573	124
3	India	50	6088	122
4	New Zealand	35	3918	112
5	Pakistan	31	3446	111
6	England	33	3610	109
7	Sri Lanka	43	4508	105
8	West Indies	28	2521	90
9	Bangladesh	38	1731	46
10	Zimbabwe	32	736	23
11	Ireland	10	190	19
12	Kenya	12	0	0
Reference: ICC Official Rankings List, 20 March 2009

== April ==
=== ICC World Cup Qualifier ===
The 2009 ICC World Cup Qualifier is a cricket tournament that took place in April 2009 in South Africa. It was the final qualification tournament for the 2011 Cricket World Cup.

The top four teams (Ireland, Canada, Kenya and Netherlands) qualified for the 2011 Cricket World Cup, and Scotland retained the One-day international, meanwhile Afghanistan gained the ODI status for the following four years and also automatically qualify for the ICC Intercontinental Cup. The bottom two teams was relegated to 2011 ICC World Cricket League Division Three. The final and the play-offs for third and fifth place was official ODIs.

==== Group stage ====
Group A
Pos	Team	Pld	W	L	T	NR	Pts	NRR
1	Ireland	5	5	0	0	0	10	1.492
2	Canada	5	4	1	0	0	8	1.490
3	Scotland	5	3	2	0	0	6	−0.318
4	Namibia	5	1	4	0	0	2	−0.506
5	Uganda	5	1	4	0	0	2	−0.928
6	Oman	5	1	4	0	0	2	−1.144

Group B
Pos	Team	Pld	W	L	T	NR	Pts	NRR
1	Kenya	5	4	1	0	0	8	1.683
2	Netherlands	5	4	1	0	0	8	0.557
3	United Arab Emirates	5	4	1	0	0	8	−0.131
4	Afghanistan	5	2	3	0	0	4	−0.278
5	Bermuda	5	1	4	0	0	2	−0.441
6	Denmark	5	0	5	0	0	0	−1.341

Team qualifies for Super Eights
Team moves into the 9th Place Playoff Semifinals

Group Stage
No.	Date	Team 1	Captain 1	Team 2	Captain 2	Venue	Result
Match 1	1 April	Denmark	Freddie Klokker	Afghanistan	Nowroz Mangal	Isak Steyl Stadium, Vanderbijlpark	Afghanistan by 5 wickets
Match 2	1 April	Bermuda	Irving Romaine	United Arab Emirates	Khurram Khan	Fanie du Toit Sports Complex, Potchefstroom	United Arab Emirates by 4 wickets
Match 3	1 April	Canada	Ashish Bagai	Oman	Hemal Mehta	LC de Villiers Oval, Pretoria	Canada by 103 runs
ODI 2830	1 April	Scotland	Ryan Watson	Ireland	William Porterfield	Willowmoore Park, Benoni	Ireland by 7 wickets
ODI 2831	1 April	Kenya	Steve Tikolo	Netherlands	Jeroen Smits	Senwes Park, Potchefstroom	Netherlands by 7 wickets
Match 6	1 April	Uganda	Junior Kwebiha	Namibia	Louis Burger	Stan Friedman Oval, Krugersdorp	Uganda by 6 runs
Match 7	2 April	Afghanistan	Nowroz Mangal	Bermuda	Irving Romaine	Senwes Park, Potchefstroom	Afghanistan won by 60 runs
Match 8	2 April	Uganda	Junior Kwebiha	Canada	Ashish Bagai	Walter Milton Oval, Johannesburg	Canada won by 5 wickets
Match 9	2 April	Netherlands	Jeroen Smits	Denmark	Freddie Klokker	Fanie du Toit Sports Complex, Potchefstroom	Netherlands won by 7 wickets
Match 10	2 April	Ireland	William Porterfield	Oman	Hemal Mehta	Stan Friedman Oval, Krugersdorp	Ireland won by 116 runs
Match 11	2 April	United Arab Emirates	Khurram Khan	Kenya	Steve Tikolo	Isak Steyl Stadium, Vanderbijlpark	Kenya by 9 wickets
Match 12	2 April	Scotland	Ryan Watson	Namibia	Louis Burger	LC de Villiers Oval, Pretoria	Scotland by 70 runs
Match 13	4 April	Kenya	Steve Tikolo	Afghanistan	Nowroz Mangal	Fanie du Toit Sports Complex, Potchefstroom	Kenya by 107 runs
Match 14	4 April	Denmark	Freddie Klokker	Bermuda	Irving Romaine	Isak Steyl Stadium, Vanderbijlpark	Bermuda by 9 wickets
Match 15	4 April	Canada	Ashish Bagai	Namibia	Louis Burger	LC de Villiers Oval, Pretoria	Canada by 141 runs
Match 16	4 April	Uganda	Junior Kwebiha	Ireland	William Porterfield	Stan Friedman Oval, Krugersdorp	Ireland by 6 wickets
Match 17	4 April	Netherlands	Jeroen Smits	United Arab Emirates	Khurram Khan	Senwes Park, Potchefstroom	United Arab Emirates by 2 wickets
Match 18	4 April	Scotland	Ryan Watson	Oman	Hemal Mehta	Walter Milton Oval, Johannesburg	Scotland by 9 runs
Match 19	6 April	Afghanistan	Nowroz Mangal	Netherlands	Jeroen Smits	Isak Steyl Stadium, Vanderbijlpark	Netherlands by 5 wickets
ODI 2835	6 April	Kenya	Steve Tikolo	Bermuda	Irving Romaine	Senwes Park, Potchefstroom	Kenya by 7 wickets
ODI 2836	6 April	Canada	Ashish Bagai	Ireland	William Porterfield	Willowmoore Park, Benoni	Ireland by 6 wickets
Match 22	6 April	United Arab Emirates	Khurram Khan	Denmark	Freddie Klokker	Fanie du Toit Sports Complex, Potchefstroom	United Arab Emirates by 112 runs
Match 23	6 April	Namibia	Louis Burger	Oman	Hemal Mehta	Stan Friedman Oval, Krugersdorp	Namibia by 119 runs
Match 24	6 April	Scotland	Ryan Watson	Uganda	Junior Kwebiha	Walter Milton Oval, Johannesburg	Scotland by 45 runs
Match 25	8 April	Afghanistan	Nowroz Mangal	United Arab Emirates	Khurram Khan	Isak Steyl Stadium, Vanderbijlpark	United Arab Emirates by 5 wickets
ODI 2837	8 April	Netherlands	Jeroen Smits	Bermuda	Irving Romaine	Senwes Park, Potchefstroom	Netherlands by 64 runs
ODI 2838	8 April	Canada	Ashish Bagai	Scotland	Ryan Watson	Willowmoore Park, Benoni	Canada by 148 runs
Match 28	8 April	Denmark	Freddie Klokker	Kenya	Steve Tikolo	Fanie du Toit Sports Complex, Potchefstroom	Kenya by 9 wickets
Match 29	8 April	Ireland	William Porterfield	Namibia	Louis Burger	Walter Milton Oval, Johannesburg	Ireland by 7 wickets
Match 30	8 April	Oman	Hemal Mehta	Uganda	Junior Kwebiha	LC de Villiers Oval, Pretoria	Oman by 1 wicket

==== 9th Place Playoffs ====
9th Place Playoff Semifinals
No.	Date	Team 1	Captain 1	Team 2	Captain 2	Venue	Result
Semifinal	11 April	Uganda	Junior Kwebiha	Denmark	Freddie Klokker	Fanie du Toit Sports Complex, Potchefstroom	Uganda by 62 runs
Semifinal	11 April	Oman	Hemal Mehta	Bermuda	Irving Romaine	Senwes Park, Potchefstroom	Bermuda by 8 wickets
11th Place Playoff
11th Place Playoff	13 April	Denmark	Freddie Klokker	Oman	Hemal Mehta	Fanie du Toit Sports Complex, Potchefstroom	Oman by 5 wickets
9th Place Playoff
9th Place Playoff	13 April	Uganda	DK Arinaitwe	Bermuda	Irving Romaine	Senwes Park, Potchefstroom	Bermuda by 8 wickets

==== Super Eights ====
Pos	Team	Pld	W	L	T	NR	Pts	NRR
1	Ireland	7	5	2	0	0	10	0.689
2	Canada	7	4	3	0	0	8	0.687
3	Kenya	7	4	3	0	0	8	0.035
4	Netherlands	7	4	3	0	0	8	0.025
5	Scotland	7	3	4	0	0	6	−0.140
6	Afghanistan	7	3	4	0	0	6	−0.209
7	United Arab Emirates	7	3	4	0	0	6	−1.080
8	Namibia	7	2	5	0	0	4	−0.079

Team qualifies for 2011 Cricket World Cup and gains ODI status
Team gains ODI status
Team plays in the 7th place playoff

Super Eights
No.	Date	Team 1	Captain 1	Team 2	Captain 2	Venue	Result
Match 1	11 April	Kenya	Steve Tikolo	Canada	Ashish Bagai	Willowmoore Park, Benoni	Canada by 7 wickets
Match 2	11 April	Namibia	Louis Burger	United Arab Emirates	Khurram Khan	LC de Villiers Oval, Pretoria	Namibia by 49 runs
Match 3	11 April	Afghanistan	Nowroz Mangal	Ireland	William Porterfield	Stan Friedman Oval, Krugersdorp	Afghanistan by 22 runs
Match 4	11 April	Scotland	Ryan Watson	Netherlands	Jeroen Smits	Walter Milton Oval, Johannesburg	Scotland by 26 runs
Match 5	13 April	Namibia	Louis Burger	Netherlands	Jeroen Smits	Willowmoore Park, Benoni	Netherlands by 2 wickets
Match 6	13 April	Afghanistan	Nowroz Mangal	Canada	Ashish Bagai	LC de Villiers Oval, Pretoria	Canada by 6 wickets
Match 7	13 April	Kenya	Steve Tikolo	Scotland	Ryan Watson	Stan Friedman Oval, Krugersdorp	Kenya by 24 runs
Match 8	13 April	United Arab Emirates	Khurram Khan	Ireland	William Porterfield	Walter Milton Oval, Johannesburg	Ireland by 8 wickets
Match 9	15 April	Scotland	Ryan Watson	Afghanistan	Nowroz Mangal	Willowmoore Park, Benoni	Afghanistan by 42 runs
Match 10	15 April	Ireland	William Porterfield	Netherlands	Jeroen Smits	LC de Villiers Oval, Pretoria	Ireland by 6 wickets
Match 11	15 April	Canada	Ashish Bagai	United Arab Emirates	Khurram Khan	Stan Friedman Oval, Krugersdorp	United Arab Emirates by 5 wickets
Match 12	15 April	Namibia	Louis Burger	Kenya	Steve Tikolo	Walter Milton Oval, Johannesburg	Namibia by 201 runs
Match 13	17 April	Scotland	Ryan Watson	United Arab Emirates	Khurram Khan	Willowmoore Park, Benoni	Scotland by 22 runs
Match 14	17 April	Ireland	William Porterfield	Kenya	Steve Tikolo	LC de Villiers Oval, Pretoria	Kenya by 6 wickets
Match 15	17 April	Namibia	Louis Burger	Afghanistan	Nowroz Mangal	Stan Friedman Oval, Krugersdorp	Afghanistan by 21 runs
Match 16	17 April	Canada	Ashish Bagai	Netherlands	Jeroen Smits	Walter Milton Oval, Johannesburg	Netherlands by 6 wickets

==== Playoffs ====
No.	Date	Team 1	Captain 1	Team 2	Captain 2	Venue	Result
7th Place Playoff
7th Place Playoff	19 April	Namibia	Louis Burger	United Arab Emirates	Khurram Khan	Stan Friedman Oval, Krugersdorp	United Arab Emirates by 4 wickets
5th Place Playoff
ODI 2842	19 April	Afghanistan	Nowroz Mangal	Scotland	Ryan Watson	Willowmoore Park, Benoni	Afghanistan by 89 runs
3rd Place Playoff
ODI 2844	19 April	Kenya	Steve Tikolo	Netherlands	Jeroen Smits	Senwes Park, Potchefstroom	Netherlands by 6 wickets
Final
ODI 2843	19 April	Canada	Ashish Bagai	Ireland	William Porterfield	SuperSport Park, Centurion	Ireland by 9 wickets

==== Final standings ====
Position	Team	Status
1st	Ireland	Qualified for the 2011 World Cup, the 2009–10 Intercontinental Cup and gained ODI status until 2014
2nd	Canada	Qualified for the 2011 World Cup, the 2009–10 Intercontinental Cup and gained ODI status until 2014
3rd	Netherlands	Qualified for the 2011 World Cup, the 2009–10 Intercontinental Cup and gained ODI status until 2014
4th	Kenya	Qualified for the 2011 World Cup, the 2009–10 Intercontinental Cup and gained ODI status until 2014
5th	Afghanistan	Qualified for the 2009–10 Intercontinental Cup and gained ODI status until 2014
6th	Scotland	Qualified for the 2009–10 Intercontinental Cup and gained ODI status until 2014
7th	United Arab Emirates	Relegated to Division Two and the 2009–10 Intercontinental Shield
8th	Namibia	Relegated to Division Two and the 2009–10 Intercontinental Shield
9th	Bermuda	Relegated to Division Two and the 2009–10 Intercontinental Shield
10th	Uganda	Relegated to Division Two and the 2009–10 Intercontinental Shield
11th	Oman	Relegated to 2011 Division Three.
12th	Denmark	Relegated to 2011 Division Three.

=== Pakistan vs Australia in the United Arab Emirates ===
No.	Date	Home captain	Away captain	Venue	Result
ODI series
ODI 2845	22 April	Younis Khan	Michael Clarke	Dubai Sports City Cricket Stadium, Dubai	Pakistan by 4 wickets
ODI 2846	24 April	Younis Khan	Michael Clarke	Dubai Sports City Cricket Stadium, Dubai	Australia by 6 wickets
ODI 2847	27 April	Younis Khan	Michael Clarke	Sheikh Zayed Cricket Stadium, Abu Dhabi	Australia by 27 runs
ODI 2848	1 May	Younis Khan	Michael Clarke	Sheikh Zayed Cricket Stadium, Abu Dhabi	Australia by 8 wickets
ODI 2849	3 May	Younis Khan	Michael Clarke	Sheikh Zayed Cricket Stadium, Abu Dhabi	Pakistan by 7 wickets
Only T20I
T20I 89	7 May	Misbah-ul-Haq	Brad Haddin	Dubai Sports City Cricket Stadium, Dubai	Pakistan by 7 wickets

- This series was moved from Pakistan to UAE for security reasons.

== May ==
=== West Indies in England ===
No.	Date	Home captain	Away captain	Venue	Result
Test Series
Test 1919	6–10 May	Andrew Strauss	Chris Gayle	Lord's, London	England by 10 wickets
Test 1920	14–18 May	Andrew Strauss	Chris Gayle	Riverside Ground, Chester-le-Street	England by an innings and 83 runs
ODI series
ODI 2849a	21 May	Andrew Strauss	Chris Gayle	Headingley, Leeds	Match abandoned
ODI 2850	24 May	Andrew Strauss	Chris Gayle	County Ground, Bristol	England by 6 wickets
ODI 2851	26 May	Andrew Strauss	Chris Gayle	Edgbaston, Birmingham	England by 58 runs

=== ICC World Cricket League Division Seven ===
==== Group stage ====
The 2009 ICC World Cricket League Division Seven will be held in May 2009 in Guernsey. The two leading teams of the tournament will be promoted to Division Six later the same year.

Pos	Team	Pld	W	L	T	NR	Pts	NRR
1	Bahrain	5	5	0	0	0	10	2.920
2	Guernsey	5	4	1	0	0	8	1.260
3	Japan	5	2	3	0	0	4	−0.501
4	Nigeria	5	2	3	0	0	4	−0.758
5	Gibraltar	5	1	4	0	0	2	−0.873
6	Suriname	5	1	4	0	0	2	−2.166

Group stage
No.	Date	Team 1	Captain 1	Team 2	Captain 2	Venue	Result
1st	17 May	Bahrain	Yaser Sadeq	Gibraltar	Christian Rocca	King George V Sports Ground, Castel	No result
2nd	17 May	Japan		Guernsey	Stuart Le Prevost	College Field, St Peter Port	No result
3rd	17 May	Suriname	Shazam Ramjohn	Nigeria	Wale Adeoye	Guernsey Rovers Athletic Club, Port Soif	Abandoned without ball bowled
4th	18 May	Bahrain	Yaser Sadeq	Suriname	Shazam Ramjohn	College Field, St Peter Port	Bahrain by 161 runs
5th	18 May	Gibraltar	Christian Rocca	Guernsey	Stuart Le Prevost	Guernsey Rovers Athletic Club, Port Soif	Guernsey by 4 wickets
6th	18 May	Japan	Masaomi Kobayashi	Nigeria	Wale Adeoye	King George V Sports Ground, Castel	Nigeria by 2 wickets
1st (R)	19 May	Bahrain	Yaser Sadeq	Gibraltar	Christian Rocca	King George V Sports Ground, Castel	Bahrain by 137 runs
2nd (R)	19 May	Guernsey	Stuart Le Prevost	Japan	Masaomi Kobayashi	College Field, St Peter Port	Guernsey by 7 wickets
3rd (R)	19 May	Suriname	Shazam Ramjohn	Nigeria	Wale Adeoye	Guernsey Rovers Athletic Club, Port Soif	Suriname by 95 runs
7th	20 May	Nigeria	Wale Adeoye	Gibraltar	Christian Rocca	College Field, St Peter Port	Nigeria by 88 runs
8th	20 May	Suriname	Shazam Ramjohn	Japan	Masaomi Kobayashi	Guernsey Rovers Athletic Club, Port Soif	Japan by 8 wickets
9th	20 May	Bahrain	Yaser Sadeq	Guernsey	Styart Le Prevost	King George V Sports Ground, Castel	Bahrain by 25 runs
10th	21 May	Bahrain	Yaser Sadeq	Japan	Masaomi Kobayashi	Guernsey Rovers Athletic Club, Port Soif	Bahrain by 196 runs
11th	21 May	Gibraltar	Christian Rocca	Suriname	Shazam Ramjohn	King George V Sports Ground, Castel	Gibraltar by 39 runs
12th	21 May	Guernsey	Stuart Le Prevost	Nigeria	Wale Adeoye	College Field, St Peter Port	Guernsey by 8 wickets
13th	23 May	Bahrain	Yaser Sadeq	Nigeria	Wale Adeoye	Guernsey Rovers Athletic Club, Port Soif	Bahrain by 176 runs
14th	23 May	Gibraltar	Christian Rocca	Japan	Masaomi Kobayashi	College Field, St Peter Port	Japan by 29 runs
15th	23 May	Guernsey	Stuart Le Prevost	Suriname	Shazam Ramjohn	King George V Sports Ground, Castel	Guernsey by 263 runs

- (R)-replayed

==== Finals and play-offs ====
No.	Date	Team 1	Captain 1	Team 2	Captain 2	Venue	Result
Final	24 May	Guernsey	Stuart Le Prevost	Bahrain	Yaser Sadeq	King George V Sports Ground, Castel	Bahrain by 3 wickets
3rd Place	24 May	Nigeria	Wale Adeoye	Japan	Masaomi Kobayashi	College Field, St Peter Port	Nigeria by 68 runs
5th Place	24 May	Suriname	Shazam Ramjohn	Gibraltar	Christian Rocca	Guernsey Rovers Athletic Club, Port Soif	Suriname by 8 runs

===== Final Placings =====
Pos	Team	Status
1st	Bahrain	Promoted to Global Division Six for 2009
2nd	Guernsey	Promoted to Global Division Six for 2009
3rd	Nigeria	Remain in Global Division Seven for 2011
4th	Japan	Remain in Global Division Seven for 2011
5th	Suriname	Relegated to Global Division Eight for 2010
6th	Gibraltar	Relegated to Global Division Eight for 2010

== June ==
=== ICC World Twenty20 ===
==== Group stage ====
Group A
Team	Pld	W	L	T	NR	NRR	Pts
India (1)	2	2	0	0	0	+1.227	4
Ireland	2	1	1	0	0	−0.162	2
Bangladesh (9)	2	0	2	0	0	−0.996	0

Group B
Team	Pld	W	L	T	NR	NRR	Pts
England (5)	2	1	1	0	0	+1.175	2
Pakistan (7)	2	1	1	0	0	+0.850	2
Netherlands	2	1	1	0	0	−2.025	2

Group C
Team	Pld	W	L	T	NR	NRR	Pts
Sri Lanka (3)	2	2	0	0	0	+0.626	4
West Indies (8)	2	1	1	0	0	+0.715	2
Australia (2)	2	0	2	0	0	−1.331	0

Group D
Team	Pld	W	L	T	NR	NRR	Pts
South Africa (4)	2	2	0	0	0	+3.275	4
New Zealand (6)	2	1	1	0	0	+0.309	2
Scotland	2	0	2	0	0	−5.281	0

Group Stage
No.	Date	Team 1	Captain 1	Team 2	Captain 2	Venue	Result
T20I 90	5 June	England	Paul Collingwood	Netherlands	Jeroen Smits	Lord's, London	Netherlands by 4 wickets
T20I 91	6 June	New Zealand	Brendon McCullum	Scotland	Gavin Hamilton	Kennington Oval, London	New Zealand by 7 wickets
T20I 92	6 June	Australia	Ricky Ponting	West Indies	Chris Gayle	Kennington Oval, London	West Indies by 7 wickets
T20I 93	6 June	Bangladesh	Mohammad Ashraful	India	Mahendra Singh Dhoni	Trent Bridge, Nottingham	India by 25 runs
T20I 94	7 June	Scotland	Gavin Hamilton	South Africa	Graeme Smith	Kennington Oval, London	South Africa by 130 runs
T20I 95	7 June	England	Paul Collingwood	Pakistan	Younis Khan	Kennington Oval, London	England by 48 runs
T20I 96	8 June	Bangladesh	Mohammad Ashraful	Ireland	William Porterfield	Trent Bridge, Nottingham	Ireland by 6 wickets
T20I 97	8 June	Australia	Ricky Ponting	Sri Lanka	Kumar Sangakkara	Trent Bridge, Nottingham	Sri Lanka by 6 wickets
T20I 98	9 June	Netherlands	Jeroen Smits	Pakistan	Younis Khan	Lord's, London	Pakistan by 82 runs
T20I 99	9 June	New Zealand	Brendon McCullum	South Africa	Graeme Smith	Lord's, London	South Africa by 1 run
T20I 100	10 June	Sri Lanka	Kumar Sangakkara	West Indies	Denesh Ramdin	Trent Bridge, Nottingham	Sri Lanka by 15 runs
T20I 101	10 June	India	Mahendra Singh Dhoni	Ireland	William Porterfield	Trent Bridge, Nottingham	India by 8 wickets

==== Super Eights ====
Group E
Team	Pld	W	L	T	NR	NRR	Pts
South Africa	3	3	0	0	0	+0.787	6
West Indies	3	2	1	0	0	+0.063	4
England	3	1	2	0	0	−0.414	2
India	3	0	3	0	0	−0.466	0

Group F
Team	Pld	W	L	T	NR	NRR	Pts
Sri Lanka	3	3	0	0	0	+1.267	6
Pakistan	3	2	1	0	0	+1.185	4
New Zealand	3	1	2	0	0	−0.232	2
Ireland	3	0	3	0	0	−2.183	0

Super 8's
No.	Date	Team 1	Captain 1	Team 2	Captain 2	Venue	Result
T20I 102	11 June	New Zealand	Brendon McCullum	Ireland	William Porterfield	Trent Bridge, Nottingham	New Zealand by 83 runs
T20I 103	11 June	England	Paul Collingwood	South Africa	Graeme Smith	Trent Bridge, Nottingham	South Africa by 7 wickets
T20I 104	12 June	Pakistan	Younis Khan	Sri Lanka	Kumar Sangakkara	Lord's, London	Sri Lanka by 19 runs
T20I 105	12 June	India	Mahendra Singh Dhoni	West Indies	Chris Gayle	Lord's, London	West Indies by 7 wickets
T20I 106	13 June	South Africa	Graeme Smith	West Indies	Chris Gayle	Kennington Oval, London	South Africa by 20 runs
T20I 107	13 June	New Zealand	Daniel Vettori	Pakistan	Younis Khan	Kennington Oval, London	Pakistan by 6 wickets
T20I 108	14 June	Ireland	William Porterfield	Sri Lanka	Kumar Sangakkara	Lord's, London	Sri Lanka by 9 runs
T20I 109	14 June	India	Mahendra Singh Dhoni	England	Paul Collingwood	Lord's, London	England by 3 runs
T20I 110	15 June	Pakistan	Younis Khan	Ireland	William Porterfield	Kennington Oval, London	Pakistan by 39 runs
T20I 111	15 June	England	Paul Collingwood	West Indies	Chris Gayle	Kennington Oval, London	West Indies by 5 wickets (D/L)
T20I 112	16 June	Sri Lanka	Kumar Sangakkara	New Zealand	Daniel Vettori	Trent Bridge, Nottingham	Sri Lanka by 48 runs
T20I 113	16 June	India	Mahendra Singh Dhoni	South Africa	Graeme Smith	Trent Bridge, Nottingham	South Africa by 9 runs

==== Knockout stage ====
No.	Date	Team 1	Captain 1	Team 2	Captain 2	Venue	Result
Semifinals
T20I 114	18 June	Pakistan	Younis Khan	South Africa	Graeme Smith	Trent Bridge, Nottingham	Pakistan by 7 runs
T20I 115	19 June	Sri Lanka	Kumar Sangakkara	West Indies	Chris Gayle	Kennington Oval, London	Sri Lanka by 57 runs
Final
T20I 116	21 June	Pakistan	Younis Khan	Sri Lanka	Kumar Sangakkara	Lord's, London	Pakistan by 8 wickets

=== India in the West Indies ===
No.	Date	Home Captain	Away Captain	Venue	Result
ODI series
ODI 2852	26 June	Chris Gayle	Mahendra Singh Dhoni	Sabina Park, Kingston	India by 20 runs
ODI 2853	28 June	Chris Gayle	Mahendra Singh Dhoni	Sabina Park, Kingston	West Indies by 8 wickets
ODI 2854	3 July	Chris Gayle	Mahendra Singh Dhoni	Beausejour Stadium, Gros Islet	India by 6 wickets (D/L)
ODI 2855	5 July	Chris Gayle	Mahendra Singh Dhoni	Beausejour Stadium, Gros Islet	No result

== July ==
=== Pakistan in Sri Lanka ===
No.	Date	Home Captain	Away Captain	Venue	Result
Test Series
Test 1921	4–8 July	Kumar Sangakkara	Younis Khan	Galle International Stadium, Galle	Sri Lanka by 50 runs
Test 1924	12–16 July	Kumar Sangakkara	Younis Khan	P. Sara Oval, Colombo	Sri Lanka by 7 wickets
Test 1927	20–24 July	Kumar Sangakkara	Younis Khan	SSC Ground, Colombo	Match drawn
ODI
ODI 2864	30 July	Kumar Sangakkara	Younis Khan	Rangiri Dambulla International Stadium, Dambulla	Sri Lanka by 36 runs
ODI 2866	1 August	Kumar Sangakkara	Younis Khan	Rangiri Dambulla International Stadium, Dambulla	Sri Lanka by 6 wickets
ODI 2867	3 August	Kumar Sangakkara	Younis Khan	Rangiri Dambulla International Stadium, Dambulla	Sri Lanka by 6 wickets
ODI 2868	7 August	Kumar Sangakkara	Younis Khan	R. Premadasa Stadium, Colombo	Pakistan by 146 runs
ODI 2870	9 August	Kumar Sangakkara	Younis Khan	R. Premadasa Stadium, Colombo	Pakistan by 132 runs
T20I
T20I 118	12 August	Kumar Sangakkara	Shahid Afridi	R. Premadasa Stadium, Colombo	Pakistan won by 52 runs

=== Canada in Scotland ===
No.	Date	Home Captain	Away Captain	Venue	Result
ODI series
ODI 2856	7 July	Gavin Hamilton	Ashish Bagai	Mannofield Park, Aberdeen	Canada by 6 wickets
ODI 2857	8 July	Gavin Hamilton	Ashish Bagai	Mannofield Park, Aberdeen	Scotland by 5 wickets

Scotland and Canada also played an Intercontinental Cup match. See main article.

=== Kenya in Ireland ===
No.	Date	Home Captain	Away Captain	Venue	Result
ODI series
ODI 2858	9 July	William Porterfield	Morris Ouma	Clontarf Cricket Club Ground, Dublin	Ireland by 3 wickets
ODI 2860	11 July	William Porterfield	Morris Ouma	Clontarf Cricket Club Ground, Dublin	Ireland by 52 runs (D/L)
ODI 2861	12 July	William Porterfield	Morris Ouma	Clontarf Cricket Club Ground, Dublin	Ireland by 4 runs (D/L)

Kenya and Ireland also played an Intercontinental Cup match. See main article.

=== Australia in England ===
No.	Date	Home Captain	Away Captain	Venue	Result
Test Series (The 2009 Ashes)
Test 1922	8–12 July	Andrew Strauss	Ricky Ponting	Sophia Gardens, Cardiff	Match drawn
Test 1925	16–20 July	Andrew Strauss	Ricky Ponting	Lord's Cricket Ground, London	England won by 115 runs
Test 1928	30 July–3 August	Andrew Strauss	Ricky Ponting	Edgbaston Cricket Ground, Birmingham	Match drawn
Test 1929	7–11 August	Andrew Strauss	Ricky Ponting	Headingley Cricket Ground, Leeds	Australia won by an innings and 80 runs
Test 1931	20–24 August	Andrew Strauss	Ricky Ponting	The Oval, London	England won by 197 runs
T20I Series
T20I 119	30 August	Paul Collingwood	Michael Clarke	Old Trafford Cricket Ground, Manchester	No result
T20I 119a	1 September	Paul Collingwood	Michael Clarke	Old Trafford Cricket Ground, Manchester	No result
ODI series
ODI 2882	4 September	Andrew Strauss	Michael Clarke	The Oval, London	Australia won by 4 runs
ODI 2883	6 September	Andrew Strauss	Michael Clarke	Lord's Cricket Ground, London	Australia won by 39 runs
ODI 2885	9 September	Andrew Strauss	Michael Clarke	Rose Bowl, Southampton	Australia by 6 wickets
ODI 2888	12 September	Andrew Strauss	Ricky Ponting	Lord's Cricket Ground, London	Australia by 7 wickets
ODI 2890	15 September	Andrew Strauss	Ricky Ponting	Trent Bridge, Nottingham	Australia by 4 wickets
ODI 2891	17 September	Andrew Strauss	Ricky Ponting	Trent Bridge, Nottingham	Australia by 111 runs
ODI 2892	20 September	Andrew Strauss	Ricky Ponting	Riverside Ground, Chester-le-Street	England by 4 wickets

=== Bangladesh in the West Indies ===
No.	Date	Home captain	Away captain	Venue	Result
Test series
Test 1923	9–13 July	Floyd Reifer	Mashrafe Mortaza	Arnos Vale Stadium, Kingstown, Saint Vincent	Bangladesh by 95 runs
Test 1926	17–21 July	Floyd Reifer	Shakib Al Hasan	Cricket National Stadium, St. George's, Grenada	Bangladesh by 4 wickets
ODI series
ODI 2862	26 July	Floyd Reifer	Shakib Al Hasan	Windsor Park, Roseau, Dominica	Bangladesh by 52 runs
ODI 2863	28 July	Floyd Reifer	Shakib Al Hasan	Windsor Park, Roseau, Dominica	Bangladesh by 3 wickets
ODI 2865	31 July	Floyd Reifer	Shakib Al Hasan	Warner Park Sporting Complex, Basseterre, St. Kitts	Bangladesh by 3 wickets
Only T20I
T20I 117	2 August	Floyd Reifer	Shakib Al Hasan	Warner Park Sporting Complex, Basseterre, St. Kitts	West Indies by 5 wickets

=== Canada in the Netherlands ===
No.	Date	Home Captain	Away Captain	Venue	Result
ODI series
ODI 2859	11 July	Jeroen Smits	Ashish Bagai	VRA Ground, Amstelveen, Netherlands	Netherlands by 50 runs
ODI 2860a	12 July	Jeroen Smits	Ashish Bagai	VRA Ground, Amstelveen, Netherlands	Match Abandoned

Canada and the Netherlands also played an Intercontinental Cup match. See main article.

=== New Zealand in Zimbabwe ===
New Zealand were due to tour Zimbabwe for a series of three One Day Internationals in 2009 but the tour was cancelled due to political and security reasons, and the New Zealand Cricket discussed possible fixtures in 2010 but made no definitive decisions.

== August ==
=== Bangladesh in Zimbabwe ===
No.	Date	Home Captain	Away Captain	Venue	Result
ODI series
ODI 2869	9 August	Prosper Utseya	Shakib Al Hasan	Queens Sports Club, Bulawayo	Bangladesh by 8 wickets
ODI 2871	11 August	Prosper Utseya	Shakib Al Hasan	Queens Sports Club, Bulawayo	Bangladesh by 49 runs
ODI 2872	14 August	Prosper Utseya	Shakib Al Hasan	Queens Sports Club, Bulawayo	Zimbabwe by 69 runs
ODI 2873	16 August	Prosper Utseya	Shakib Al Hasan	Queens Sports Club, Bulawayo	Bangladesh by 4 wickets
ODI 2874	18 August	Prosper Utseya	Shakib Al Hasan	Queens Sports Club, Bulawayo	Bangladesh by 5 wickets

=== Kenya in Canada ===
No.	Date	Home Captain	Away Captain	Venue	Result
ODI series
ODI 2875	19 August	Ashish Bagai	Morris Ouma	Maple Leaf Cricket Club, King City	Canada won by 9 wickets
ODI 2875a	21 August	Ashish Bagai	Morris Ouma	Maple Leaf Cricket Club, King City	Match abandoned without a ball bowled
ODI 2877	21 August	Ashish Bagai	Morris Ouma	Maple Leaf Cricket Club, King City	No result
ODI 2877b	23 August			Maple Leaf Cricket Club, King City	Match abandoned without a ball bowled

Kenya and Canada also will play an Intercontinental Cup match. See main article.

=== New Zealand in Sri Lanka ===
No.	Date	Home Captain	Away Captain	Venue	Result
Test Series
Test 1930	18–22 August	Kumar Sangakkara	Daniel Vettori	Galle International Stadium, Galle	Sri Lanka by 202 runs
Test 1932	26–30 August	Kumar Sangakkara	Daniel Vettori	SSC Ground, Colombo	Sri Lanka by 96 runs
T20I Series
T20I 120	2 September	Kumar Sangakkara	Daniel Vettori	R. Premadasa Stadium, Colombo	New Zealand by 3 runs
T20I 121	4 September	Kumar Sangakkara	Daniel Vettori	R. Premadasa Stadium, Colombo	New Zealand by 22 runs

Sri Lanka, New Zealand, and India will play in a tri-series during this time.

In the T20I No. 120 Jacob Oram took the second hat-trick in Twenty20 International

=== Afghanistan in Zimbabwe ===
Afghanistan and Zimbabwe XI played an Intercontinental Cup match. See main article.

=== Ireland in Scotland ===
No.	Date	Home Captain	Away Captain	Venue	Result
ODI series
ODI 2876	22 August	William Porterfield	Gavin Hamilton	Mannofield Park, Aberdeen	Ireland won by 96 runs
ODI 2877a	23 August			Mannofield Park, Aberdeen	Match abandoned without a ball bowled

Ireland and Scotland also played an Intercontinental Cup match. See main article.

=== England in Ireland ===
No.	Date	Home Captain	Away Captain	Venue	Result
ODI series
ODI 2878	27 August	William Porterfield	Paul Collingwood	Civil Service Cricket Club, Belfast	England by 2 runs (D/L)

=== Australia in Scotland ===
No.	Date	Home Captain	Away Captain	Venue	Result
ODI series
ODI 2879	28 August	Gavin Hamilton	Michael Clarke	Raeburn Place, Edinburgh	Australia by 189 runs

=== Afghanistan in the Netherlands ===
No.	Date	Home Captain	Away Captain	Venue	Result
ODI series
ODI 2880	30 August	Jeroen Smits	Nowroz Mangal	VRA Cricket Ground, Amstelveen	Netherlands win by 8 runs
ODI 2881	1 September	Jeroen Smits	Nowroz Mangal	VRA Cricket Ground, Amstelveen	Afghanistan won by 6 wickets

Afghanistan and the Netherlands also played an Intercontinental Cup match. See main article.

=== ICC World Cricket League Division Six ===
==== Group stage ====
The 2009 ICC World Cricket League Division Six will be held in August and September 2009 in Singapore. The two leading teams of the tournament will be promoted to Division Five in 2010.

Pos	Team	Pld	W	L	T	NR	Pts	NRR
1	Singapore	5	5	0	0	0	10	1.045
2	Bahrain	5	3	2	0	0	6	0.909
3	Malaysia	5	3	2	0	0	6	0.467
4	Guernsey	5	2	3	0	0	4	−0.326
5	Botswana	5	1	4	0	0	2	−0.250
6	Norway	5	1	4	0	0	2	−1.746

Group Stage
Match No.	Date	Team 1	Captain 1	Team 2	Captain 2	Venue	Result
1st match	29 August	Botswana	Omar Ali	Norway	Zaheer Ashiq	Kallang, Central Region, Singapore	Norway by 19 runs
2nd match	29 August	Singapore	Chetan Suryawanshi	Guernsey	Stuart Le Prevost	The Padang, Central Region, Singapore	Singapore by 7 wickets
3rd match	29 August	Bahrain	Yaser Sadeq	Malaysia	Suhan Alagaratnam	Indian Association, Central Region, Singapore	Bahrain by 2 runs
4th match	30 August	Bahrain	Yaser Sadeq	Guernsey	Stuart Le Prevost	Kallang, Central Region, Singapore	Match abandoned without a ball bowled
5th match	30 August	Malaysia	Suhan Alagaratnam	Norway	Zaheer Ashiq	The Padang, Central Region, Singapore	Match abandoned without a ball bowled
6th match	30 August	Botswana	Omar Ali	Singapore		Indian Association, Central Region, Singapore	Match abandoned without a ball bowled
4th Match(R)	31 August	Bahrain	Yaser Sadeq	Guernsey	Stuart Le Prevost	Kallang, Central Region, Singapore	Bahrain by 62 runs
5th match(R)	31 August	Malaysia	Suhan Alagaratnam	Norway	Zaheer Ashiq	The Padang, Central Region, Singapore	Malaysia by 9 wickets
6th match(R)	31 August	Botswana	Omar Ali	Singapore	Chetan Suryawanshi	Indian Association, Central Region, Singapore	Singapore by 55 runs
7th match	1 September	Botswana	Omar Ali	Malaysia	Suhan Alagaratnam	Kallang, Central Region, Singapore	No result
8th match	1 September	Bahrain	Yaser Sadeq	Singapore	Chetan Suryawanshi	The Padang, Central Region, Singapore	Singapore by 7 wickets (D/L)
9th match	1 September	Norway	Zaheer Ashiq	Guernsey	Stuart Le Prevost	Indian Association, Central Region, Singapore	No result
10th match	2 September	Norway	Zaheer Ashiq	Singapore	Chetan Suryawanshi	Kallang, Central Region, Singapore	Singapore by 8 wickets
11th match	2 September	Bahrain	Yaser Sadeq	Botswana	Omar Ali	The Padang, Central Region, Singapore	Botswana by 69 runs
12th match	2 September	Guernsey	Stuart Le Prevost	Malaysia	Suhan Alagaratnam	Indian Association, Central Region, Singapore	Malaysia by 4 wickets
7th match(R)	3 September	Botswana	Omar Ali	Malaysia	Suhan Alagaratnam	Kallang, Central Region, Singapore	Malaysia by 8 wickets
9th match(R)	3 September	Norway	Zaheer Ashiq	Guernsey	Stuart Le Prevost	Indian Association, Central Region, Singapore	Guernsey by 47 runs
13th match	4 September	Malaysia	Suhan Alagaratnam	Singapore	Chetan Suyawanshi	Kallang, Central Region, Singapore	Singapore by 4 wickets
14th match	4 September	Guernsey	Stuart Le Prevost	Botswana	Omar Ali	The Padang, Central Region, Singapore	Guernsey by 25 runs
15th match	4 September	Bahrain	Yaser Sadeq	Norway	Zaheer Ashiq	Indian Association, Central Region, Singapore	Bahrain by 232 runs

- (R)-replayed

==== Finals and play-offs ====
Match No.	Date	Team 1	Captain 1	Team 2	Captain 2	Venue	Result
Final	5 September	Singapore	Chetan Suryawanshi	Bahrain	Yaser Sadeq	Kallang, Central Region, Singapore	Singapore by 68 runs
3rd Place Playoff	5 September	Malaysia	Suhan Alagaratnam	Guernsey	Stuart Le Prevost	The Padang, Central Region, Singapore	Guernsey by 2 runs
5th Place Playoff	5 September	Botswana	Omar Ali	Norway	Zaheer Ashiq	Indian Association, Central Region, Singapore	Botswana by 23 runs

===== Final Placings =====
After the conclusion of the tournament the teams were distributed as follows:

Pos	Team	Status
1st	Singapore	Promoted to Division Five for 2010
2nd	Bahrain	Promoted to Division Five for 2010
3rd	Guernsey	Remained in Division Six for 2011
4th	Malaysia	Remained in Division Six for 2011
5th	Botswana	Relegated to Division Seven for 2011
6th	Norway	Relegated to Division Seven for 2011

== Season summary ==
=== Result Summary ===
	Test					ODI					T20I				
	Matches	Wins	Loss	Draw	Tied	Matches	Wins	Loss	Tied	No result	Matches	Wins	Loss	Tied	No result
Australia	5	1	2	2	0	13	10	3	0	0	4	0	3	0	1
Bangladesh	2	2	0	0	0	8	7	1	0	0	3	0	3	0	0
England	7	4	1	2	0	11	4	6	1	0	6	2	3	0	1
India	No Matches					4	2	1	0	1	5	2	3	0	0
New Zealand	2	0	2	0	0	No Matches					6	3	3	0	0
Pakistan	3	0	2	1	0	10	4	6	0	0	9	7	2	0	0
South Africa	No Matches					No Matches					6	5	1	0	0
Sri Lanka	5	4	0	1	0	5	3	2	0	0	9	6	3	0	0
West Indies	4	0	4	0	0	9	1	7	0	1	7	4	3	0	0
	First-class					ODI					T20I				
Zimbabwe	1	0	0	1	0	5	1	4	0	0	No Matches				
Afghanistan	2	1	0	1	0	3	2	1	0	0	No Matches				
Bermuda	1	0	0	1	0	2	0	2	0	0	No Matches				
Canada	3	0	0	1	0	8	3	4	0	1	No Matches				
Ireland	2	0	0	2	0	8	7	1	0	0	5	1	4	0	0
Kenya	2	1	0	1	0	7	1	6	0	0	No Matches				
Netherlands	1	0	0	1	0	6	5	1	0	0	2	1	1	0	0
Scotland	2	1	1	0	0	7	1	6	0	0	2	0	2	0	0
Uganda	1	1	0	0	0	No ODI Status					No T20I Status				

- Bermuda lose their ODI status in the 2009 ICC World Cup Qualifier.
- Afghanistan won ODI status in the 2009 ICC World Cup Qualifier.

=== Stats Leaders ===
==== Test ====
Most Runs
	Matches	Runs	Avg	HS
(Sri Lanka) Kumar Sangakkara	5	544	60.44	130*
(England) Andrew Strauss	7	530	48.18	161
(Sri Lanka) Thilan Samaraweera	5	518	57.55	159
(Sri Lanka) Mahela Jayawardene	5	496	55.11	114
(Australia) Michael Clarke	5	448	64.00	136

Most Wickets
	Matches	Wickets	Avg	BBI
(England) Stuart Broad	7	26	28.73	6/91
(England) James Anderson	7	23	32.04	5/80
(Sri Lanka) Rangana Herath	4	23	26.65	5/99
(Australia) Ben Hilfenhaus	5	22	27.45	4/60
(England) Graeme Swann	7	21	32.66	4/38

==== ODI ====
Most Runs
	Matches	Runs	Avg	HS
(Australia) Michael Clarke	12	504	56.00	100*
(Australia) Shane Watson	13	492	44.72	116*
(Republic of Ireland) William Porterfield	8	414	59.14	104*
(Netherlands) Ryan ten Doeschate	5	364	121.33	106*
(Bangladesh) Tamim Iqbal	8	359	44.87	154

Most Wickets
	Matches	Wickets	Avg	BBI
(Australia) Nathan Hauritz	13	18	24.61	3/41
(Netherlands) Edgar Schiferli	6	16	15.06	4/23
(Pakistan) Shahid Afridi	10	15	22.75	6/38
(Australia) Bret Lee	7	14	22.21	5/49
(Republic of Ireland) Trent Johnston	7	13	14.46	5/14

==== T20I ====
Most Runs
	Matches	Runs	Avg	HS
(Sri Lanka) Tillakaratne Dilshan	9	375	46.87	96*
(Sri Lanka) Kumar Sangakkara	10	297	37.12	69
(Pakistan) Kamran Akmal	9	247	30.87	59*
(South Africa) Jacques Kallis	5	238	59.50	64
(Pakistan) Shahid Afridi	9	226	37.66	54*

Most Wickets
	Matches	Wickets	Avg	BBI
(Pakistan) Umar Gul	8	17	9.76	5/6
(Sri Lanka) Lasith Malinga	10	16	16.56	3/17
(Pakistan) Saeed Ajmal	9	16	12.50	4/19
(Pakistan) Shahid Afridi	9	15	12.26	4/11
(Sri Lanka) Ajantha Mendis	9	14	13.50	3/9

=== Milestones ===
==== ODI ====
- Afghanistan played and won their first ODI Match, vs Scotland, on 19 April.
- (Cricket West Indies) Chris Gayle played his 200th ODI Match, on 23 May. (57th All-time)
- (India) Yuvraj Singh reached 7,000 runs in ODI, vs West Indies on 28 June. (28th in All time)
- (Sri Lanka) Mahela Jayawardene played his 300th ODI Match, on 1 August. (14th in All time)

==== Test ====
- (England) Andrew Strauss reached 5,000 runs scored in Test, vs Australia on 8 July. (75th in All time)
- (Australia) Ricky Ponting reached 11,000 runs scored in Test, vs England on 9 July. (4th in All time)
- (Pakistan) Mohammad Yousuf reached 7,000 runs scored in Test, vs Sri Lanka on 20 July. (34th in All time)
- (Sri Lanka) Kumar Sangakkara reached 7,000 runs scored in Test, vs Pakistan on 24 July. (35th in All time)
- (New Zealand) Daniel Vettori reached 3000 test runs and 300 Test wickets in Test, vs Sri Lanka on 26 August. (8th in All time)
