= 2009 Women's Cricket World Cup =

2009 Women's World Cup
- Dates: 7 – 22 March 2009
- Administrator: International Cricket Council
- Cricket format: Women's One Day International
- Tournament format(s): Group stage and knockout
- Host: Australia
- Champions: England (3rd title)
- Runners-up: New Zealand
- Participants: 8
- Matches: 25
- Player of the series: (England) Claire Taylor
- Most runs: (England) Claire Taylor (324)
- Most wickets: (England) Laura Marsh (16)

The 2009 ICC Women's Cricket World Cup was the ninth edition of the Women's Cricket World Cup, held in Australia from 7 to 22 March 2009.

England won the tournament, beating New Zealand in the final to claim their third World Cup title. England batter Claire Taylor was the leading run-scorer and Player of the Tournament, whilst teammate Laura Marsh was the leading wicket-taker. Australia (the defending champions), West Indies, India and Pakistan were eliminated at the Super Six stage, whilst South Africa and Sri Lanka were eliminated in the first round.

== Teams ==
- New Zealand
- Australia
- England
- India
- Pakistan
- South Africa
- Sri Lanka
- West Indies

== Host selection and venues ==
The ICC, along with Cricket Australia, announced in July 2008 that six venues in New South Wales would host the tournament. The venues chosen were North Sydney Oval, Bankstown Oval and Drummoyne Oval (all in Sydney), Manuka Oval in Canberra, No. 1 Sports Ground in Newcastle and Bradman Oval in Bowral. In addition, four grounds in Sydney (Manly Oval, Old King's Oval, Raby Oval No. 1 and Village Green) hosted the nine warm-up matches for the tournament.

== Qualification ==
Six of the eight teams involved in the tournament qualified through finishing in the top six in the previous tournament; Australia, India, England, New Zealand, Sri Lanka and West Indies therefore qualified automatically for the tournament. The final two places were awarded to Pakistan and South Africa; the two finalists of the 2008 Women's Cricket World Cup Qualifier.

== Rules and regulations ==
=== Matches ===
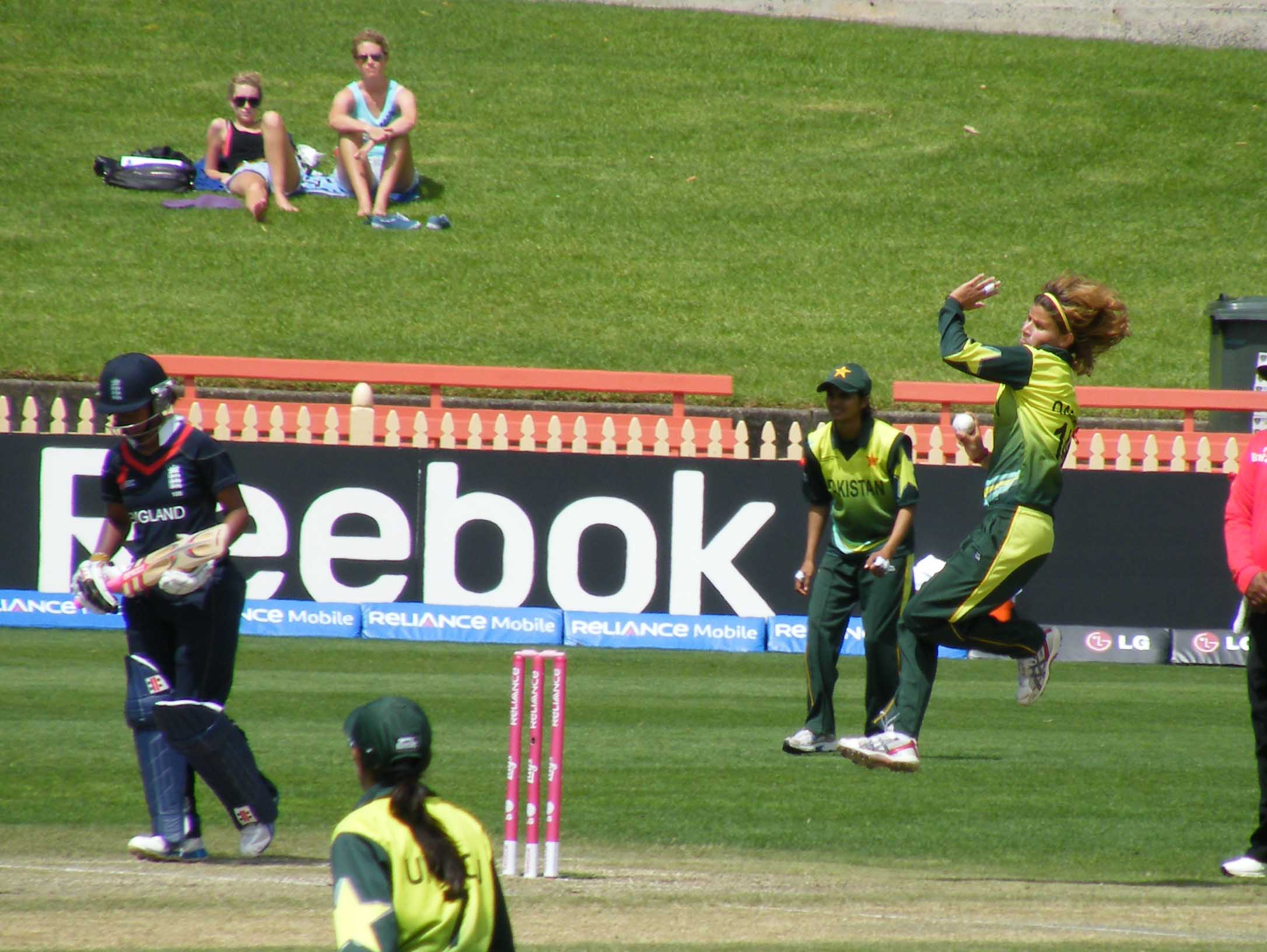
A match in progress between Pakistan and England

All matches started at 10am local time (UTC+11) and were played to standard One Day International playing conditions. All matches were to be 50 overs a side unless stated otherwise by the umpires or match referee, with each bowler entitled to bowl a maximum of 10 overs per match.

In the event of bad weather, the side batting second must have batted a minimum of 20 overs for a result to be declared (if the match was not otherwise won by that point, for example if the team batting second was dismissed before the completion of 20 overs). In the event of interrupted matches (due to rain or some other factor), the Duckworth–Lewis method was applied to determine the result or revised target.

=== Tournament points and format ===
Throughout the group and Super Six stages, two points were awarded to teams for a win, one point for a tie or matches that ended with no result, and no points were awarded for a defeat.

At the conclusion of the group stage, the three teams in each group with the most points advanced to the Super Six stage of the tournament (the first time such a stage had been held), while the two teams eliminated played in a 7th/8th place playoff. Points from matches between teams both qualifying for the Super Six stage were carried forward, therefore all six teams to advance began the Super Sixes with two games played. Following the conclusion of the Super Sixes, the top two teams contested the final, third and fourth contested a third-place play-off, while fifth and sixth played each other for fifth place.

== Results ==
=== Group stage ===
The eight qualifying teams were split into two groups for the group stage, with traditional rivals Australia and New Zealand drawn together in Group A alongside South Africa and the West Indies, while India and Pakistan, also traditional rivals, were drawn together in Group B along with England and Sri Lanka. The group stage took place between 7 and 12 March 2009.

==== Group A ====
Pos	Team	Pld	W	L	T	NR	Pts	NRR
1	New Zealand	3	3	0	0	0	6	2.015
2	Australia	3	2	1	0	0	4	0.714
3	West Indies	3	1	2	0	0	2	−0.655
4	South Africa	3	0	3	0	0	0	−1.777

Source: ESPNCricinfo

8 March 2009

New Zealand; 205 (48 overs)	v	Australia; 132/6 (33 overs)
Haidee Tiffen 57 (113); Ellyse Perry 3/40 (6 overs)		Shelley Nitschke 27 (42); Kate Pulford 3/32 (7 overs)

New Zealand won by 13 runs (D/L)
North Sydney Oval, North Sydney
Umpires: Sarika Prasad (SGP) and Shahul Hameed (IDN)
Player of the match: Kate Pulford (New Zealand)

- Australia's innings was halted after 33 overs; the Duckworth-Lewis target was 146.

8 March 2009

South Africa; 116 (44.2 overs)	v	West Indies; 117/8 (48.4 overs)
Alicia Smith 46 (109); Stafanie Taylor 4/17 (8.2 overs)		Shanel Daley 26 (67); Charlize van der Westhuizen 1/13 (10 overs)

West Indies won by 2 wickets
No. 1 Sports Ground, Newcastle
Umpires: Jeff Brookes (AUS) and Tony Hill (NZL)
Player of the match: Stafanie Taylor (West Indies)

10 March 2009

Australia; 258/4 (50 overs)	v	South Africa; 197 (49.3 overs)
Karen Rolton 96* (87); Alicia Smith 3/42 (10 overs)		Trisha Chetty 58 (78); Shelley Nitschke 3/43 (10 overs)

Australia won by 79 runs
No. 1 Sports Ground, Newcastle
Umpires: Tony Hill (NZL) and Lakani Oala (PNG)
Player of the match: Shelley Nitschke (Australia)

10 March 2009

New Zealand; 192/8 (50 overs)	v	West Indies; 136/8 (50 overs)
Sarah Tsukigawa 41 (35); Stafanie Taylor 2/33 (10 overs)		Pamela Lavine 40 (97); Aimee Mason 3/26 (10 overs)

New Zealand won by 56 runs
Bankstown Oval, Sydney
Umpires: Neil Harrison (JPN) and Tony Ward (AUS)
Player of the match: Sarah Tsukigawa (New Zealand)

12 March 2009

Australia; 211/7 (50 overs)	v	West Indies; 164/7 (50 overs)
Alex Blackwell 46 (56); Shakera Selman 2/28 (10 overs)		Deandra Dottin 51 (54); Erin Osborne 2/22 (10 overs)

Australia won by 47 runs
Drummoyne Oval, Sydney
Umpires: Kathy Cross (NZL) and Brian Jerling (ZAF)
Player of the match: Ellyse Perry (Australia)

12 March 2009

New Zealand; 250/5 (50 overs)	v	South Africa; 51 (22.1 overs)
Sara McGlashan 88* (76); Charlize van der Westhuizen 2/18 (10 overs)		Cri-Zelda Brits 25 (46); Suzie Bates 4/7 (5 overs)

New Zealand won by 199 runs
Bradman Oval, Bowral
Umpires: Mick Martell (AUS) and Tony Ward (AUS)
Player of the match: Amy Satterthwaite (New Zealand)

==== Group B ====
Pos	Team	Pld	W	L	T	NR	Pts	NRR
1	England	3	3	0	0	0	6	1.921
2	India	3	2	1	0	0	4	0.922
3	Pakistan	3	1	2	0	0	2	−0.961
4	Sri Lanka	3	0	3	0	0	0	−1.280

Source: ESPNCricinfo

7 March 2009

England; 277/5 (50 overs)	v	Sri Lanka; 177/7 (50 overs)
Claire Taylor 101 (95); Eshani Kaushalya 2/41 (7 overs)		Eshani Kaushalya 37 (50); Laura Marsh 3/32 (10 overs)

England won by 100 runs
Manuka Oval, Canberra
Umpires: Gerard Abood (AUS) and Kathy Cross (NZL)
Player of the match: Claire Taylor (England)

7 March 2009

Pakistan; 57 (29 overs)	v	India; 58/0 (10 overs)
Sana Mir 17 (54); Rumeli Dhar 3/7 (8 overs)		Anagha Deshpande 26* (37)

India won by 10 wickets
Bradman Oval, Bowral
Umpires: Neil Harrison (JPN) and Mick Martell (AUS)
Player of the match: Rumeli Dhar (India)

9 March 2009

Pakistan; 161/7 (50 overs)	v	Sri Lanka; 104 (39.4 overs)
Nain Abidi 26 (51); Suwini de Alwis 2/19 (10 overs)		Shashikala Siriwardene 58 (111); Qanita Jalil 3/33 (8 overs)

Pakistan won by 57 runs
Manuka Oval, Canberra
Umpires: Gerard Abood (AUS) and Andrew Craig (AUS)
Player of the match: Qanita Jalil (Pakistan)

10 March 2009

India; 169 (48.4 overs)	v	England; 172/1 (38.4 overs)
Mithali Raj 59 (90); Holly Colvin 3/22 (10 overs)		Caroline Atkins 69* (124); Claire Taylor 69* (65); Priyanka Roy 1/28 (5.4 overs)

England won by 9 wickets
North Sydney Oval, Sydney
Umpires: Brian Jerling (ZAF) and Shahul Hameed(IDN)
Player of the match: Caroline Atkins (England)

12 March 2009

Pakistan; 78 (39.5 overs)	v	England; 82/2 (23.1 overs)
Nain Abidi 27 (62); Laura Marsh 5/15 (10 overs)		Charlotte Edwards 32* (54); Sana Mir 1/14 (7 overs)

England won by 8 wickets
North Sydney Oval, Sydney
Umpires: Gerard Abood (AUS) and Tyron Wijewardene (LKA)
Player of the match: Laura Marsh (England)

12 March 2009

India; 137/7 (50 overs)	v	Sri Lanka; 102 (44.2 overs)
Mithali Raj 75* (102); Chamari Polgampola 2/17 (10 overs)		Dedunu Silva 21 (58); Amita Sharma 3/19 (10 overs)

India won by 35 runs
Bankstown Oval, Sydney
Umpires: Andrew Craig (AUS) and Sarika Prasad (SGP)
Player of the match: Mithali Raj (India)

=== Super Sixes ===
The top three teams in each group moved on to the Super Six stage which is scored as a complete round-robin. But each of the six teams played only three new matches, rather than five—each group's three representatives carried forward their result against each other rather than play again. Thus the table, showing five matches for each team, covers all matches between the Super Six qualifiers, including those from the group stage.

The top two teams in the final table qualified for the final.

The Super Six stage of the tournament took place between 14 and 19 March 2009.

Pos	Team	Pld	W	L	T	NR	Pts	NRR
1	New Zealand	5	4	1	0	0	8	1.180
2	England	5	4	1	0	0	8	1.157
3	India	5	3	2	0	0	6	1.105
4	Australia	5	3	2	0	0	6	0.850
5	Pakistan	5	1	4	0	0	2	−2.589
6	West Indies	5	0	5	0	0	0	−1.559

Source: ESPNCricinfo

14 March 2009

India; 234/5 (50 overs)	v	Australia; 218/7 (50 overs)
Anjum Chopra 76 (137); Lisa Sthalekar 3/52 (10 overs)		Alex Blackwell 54 (105); Gouher Sultana 2/33 (10 overs)

India won by 16 runs
North Sydney Oval, Sydney
Umpires: Tony Hill (NZL) and Brian Jerling (ZAF)
Player of the match: Anjum Chopra (India)

14 March 2009

England; 201/5 (50 overs)	v	New Zealand; 170 (48.4 overs)
Charlotte Edwards 57 (79); Sophie Devine 2/45 (8 overs)		Haidee Tiffen 53 (111); Charlotte Edwards 4/37 (8.4 overs)

England won by 31 runs
Bankstown Oval, Sydney
Umpires: Shahul Hameed (IDN) and Tyron Wijewardene (LKA)
Player of the match: Charlotte Edwards (England)

14 March 2009

West Indies; 132/9 (50 overs)	v	Pakistan; 134/6 (47.5 overs)
Stafanie Taylor 55 (115); Almas Akram 3/7 (7)		Armaan Khan 43 (48); Stafanie Taylor 1/13 (9)

Pakistan won by 4 wickets
Drummoyne Oval, Drummoyne
Umpires: Andrew Craig (AUS) and Lakani Oala (PNG)
Player of the match: Almas Akram (Pakistan)

16 March 2009

Australia; 229/6 (50 overs)	v	Pakistan; 122 (45.1 overs)
Shelley Nitschke 56 (64); Sana Mir 2/35 (10)		Asmavia Iqbal 36 (70); Leah Poulton 2/9 (3)

Australia won by 107 runs
Bankstown Oval, Bankstown
Umpires: Neil Harrison (JPN) and Tony Hill (NZL)
Player of the match: Shelley Nitschke (Australia)

17 March 2009

India; 207 (49.4 overs)	v	New Zealand; 210/5 (47.4 overs)
Reema Malhotra 59 (52); Sophie Devine 2/35 (8.4)		Kate Pulford 71 (88); Priyanka Roy 2/59 (10)

New Zealand won by 5 wickets
North Sydney Oval, North Sydney
Umpires: Steve Davis (AUS) and Shahul Hameed (IDN)
Player of the match: Kate Pulford (New Zealand)

17 March 2009

England; 236/8 (50 overs)	v	West Indies; 90 (38.2 overs)
Sarah Taylor 78 (101); Shanel Daley 3/31 (9)		Deandra Dottin 23 (30); Laura Marsh 3/17 (7.2)

England won by 146 runs
Drummoyne Oval, Drummoyne
Umpires: Jeff Brookes (AUS) and Sarika Prasad (SGP)
Player of the match: Sarah Taylor (England)

19 March 2009

England; 161 (49.3 overs)	v	Australia; 163/2 (33.5 overs)
Claire Taylor 49 (77); Sarah Andrews 3/35 (8.3)		Karen Rolton 42* (59); Laura Marsh 1/35 (8)

Australia won by 8 wickets
North Sydney Oval, North Sydney
Umpires: Brian Jerling (ZAF) and Sarika Prasad (SGP)
Player of the match: Shelley Nitschke (Australia)

19 March 2009

West Indies; 84 (44.4 overs)	v	India; 86/2 (17.5 overs)
Stafanie Taylor 29 (63); Priyanka Roy 4/14 (7.4)		Sulakshana Naik 39* (48); Debbie-Ann Lewis 2/19 (6)

India won by 8 wickets
Bankstown Oval, Bankstown
Umpires: Kathy Cross (NZL) and Tyron Wijewardene (LKA)
Player of the match: Priyanka Roy (India)

19 March 2009

New Zealand; 373/7 (50 overs)	v	Pakistan; 150 (48.1 overs)
Suzie Bates 168 (105); Haidee Tiffen 100 (128); Naila Nazir 2/47 (8)		Nain Abidi 52 (104); Lucy Doolan 3/30 (10.0)

New Zealand won by 223 runs
Drummoyne Oval, Drummoyne
Umpires: Steve Davis (AUS) and Lakani Oala (PNG)
Player of the match: Suzie Bates (New Zealand)

=== Play-Offs ===
==== 3rd place playoff ====
21 March 2009

Australia; 142 (44.4 overs)	v	India; 145/7 (43.5 overs)
Karen Rolton 52 (93); Priyanka Roy 2/21 (5); Jhulan Goswami 2/21 (9.4)		Sulakshana Naik 28 (44); Lisa Sthalekar 3/23 (10)

India won by 3 wickets
Bankstown Oval, Bankstown
Umpires: Sarika Prasad (SGP) and Tony Hill (NZL)
Player of the match: Rumeli Dhar (India)

- Rain stopped play after 13.3 overs of Australia's innings; the match was reduced to 46 overs per side.

==== 5th place playoff ====
21 March 2009

Pakistan; 131 (46.3 overs)	v	West Indies; 135/7 (46.3 overs)
Bismah Maroof 33 (69); Shanel Daley 4/29 (10)		Pamela Lavine 26 (31); Charlene Taitt 26 (67); Sana Mir 2/12 (10)

West Indies won by 3 wickets
Drummoyne Oval, Drummoyne
Umpires: Shahul Hameed (IDN) and Lakani Oala (PNG)
Player of the match: Shanel Daley (West Indies)

==== 7th place playoff ====
14 March 2009

Sri Lanka; 75 (39 overs)	v	South Africa; 76/1 (28.3 overs)
Suwini de Alwis 24 (45); Dane van Niekerk 3/11 (8)		Trisha Chetty 41* (84); Udeshika Prabodhani 1/10 (4)

South Africa won by 9 wickets
North Sydney Oval No. 2 Oval, North Sydney
Umpires: Jeff Brookes (AUS) and Neil Harrison (JPN)
Player of the match: Dane van Niekerk (South Africa)

=== Final ===
22 March 2009

New Zealand; 166 (47.2 overs)	v	England; 167/6 (46.1 overs)
Lucy Doolan 48 (57); Nicki Shaw 4/34 (8.2)		Caroline Atkins 40 (85); Lucy Doolan 3/23 (10)

England won by 4 wickets
North Sydney Oval, North Sydney
Umpires: Steve Davis (AUS) and Brian Jerling (ZAF)
Player of the match: Nicki Shaw (England)

== Awards ==
=== Team of the tournament ===
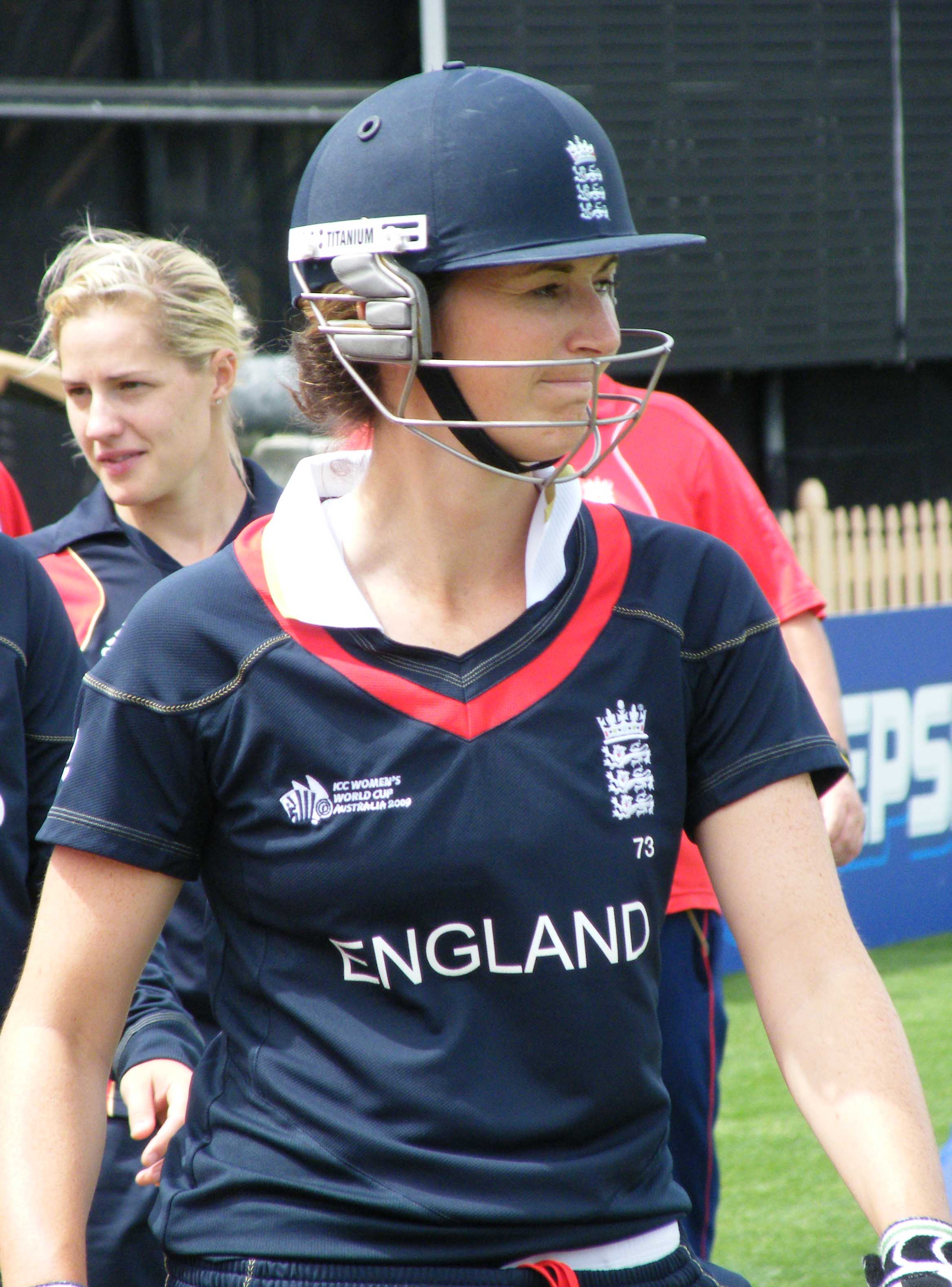
Charlotte Edwards was named as captain of the ICC's World Cup XI.

The day after the final, the ICC announced its World Cup XI, as selected by a panel led by Belinda Clark. The eleven included five members of England's tournament-winning squad, with three coming from India, two coming from runners-up New Zealand and one from Australia.

1. (New Zealand) Suzie Bates
2. (Australia) Shelley Nitschke
3. (England) Claire Taylor
4. (India) Mithali Raj
5. (England) Charlotte Edwards (captain)
6. (New Zealand) Kate Pulford
7. (England) Sarah Taylor (wicket-keeper)
8. (India) Amita Sharma
9. (England) Katherine Brunt
10. (India) Priyanka Roy
11. (England) Laura Marsh

New Zealand's Sophie Devine was named as the side's twelfth man.

=== Player of the tournament ===
The award for player of the tournament was selected by the same panel that chose the team of the tournament, and was awarded to the leading run-scorer England's Claire Taylor.
