= Joel Tom =

Papua New Guinean international cricketer (born 1989)

Personal information
- Born: 6 May 1989 (age 37); Papua New Guinea
- Batting: Right-handed
- Bowling: Right-arm medium
- Role: Bowler

International information
- National side: Papua New Guinea (2009–2015)
- Source: CricketArchive, 9 April 2016

Joel Tom (born 6 May 1989) is a Papua New Guinean international cricketer who made his debut for the PNG national team in 2009. He plays as a right-arm medium-pace bowler.

Tom represented the PNG under-19s at the 2008 Under-19 World Cup in Malaysia, appearing in his team's matches against India, the West Indies, and Bermuda. He made his senior debut for Papua New Guinea at the 2009 EAP Trophy, going on to take figures of 2/25 against Tonga and 4/8 against Japan. Tom was also successful at the 2011 edition of that tournament, taking 2/15 and 3/31 against Vanuatu (the latter in the tournament final) and 2/10 against Fiji. He was subsequently selected in Papua New Guinea's squad for the 2012 World Twenty20 Qualifier in the United Arab Emirates, the final qualification event for the 2012 World Twenty20. He only appeared in two of his team's matches, however, taking 1/23 against Bermuda and 1/15 against Nepal. In 2015, Tom was a member of the PNG A squad that won a silver medal in the cricket tournament at the 2015 Pacific Games.
