= Tendai Chitongo =

Zimbabwean cricketer (born 1989)

Personal information
- Born: 6 September 1989 (age 37); Kadoma, Zimbabwe
- Source: ESPNcricinfo, 28 September 2016

Tendai Chitongo (born 6 September 1989) is a Zimbabwean first-class cricketer. He was part of Zimbabwe's squad for the 2008 Under-19 Cricket World Cup.
