= Martin van Niekerk =

South African-born Namibian cricketer (born 1989)

Personal information
- Full name: Izak Marthinus van Niekerk
- Born: 29 May 1989 (age 37); Pretoria, Transvaal Province, South Africa
- Batting: Right-handed
- Bowling: Right-arm medium-fast

Domestic team information
- Years: Team
- 2008/09: Namibia

Career statistics
Competition	First-class
Matches	1
Runs scored	5
Batting average	–
100s/50s	–/–
Top score	4*
Balls bowled	30
Wickets	–
Bowling average	–
5 wickets in innings	–
10 wickets in match	–
Best bowling	–
Catches/stumpings	–/–
- Source: CricketArchive, 16 October 2011

Martin van Niekerk (born Izak Marthinus van Niekerk on 29 May 1989) is a South African-born Namibian cricketer. He is a right-handed batsman and right-arm medium-fast bowler. He was born in Pretoria.

Van Niekerk made his debut for the Under-19s during the 2007-08 Under-19s World Cup in February 2008, in which he played three matches, but only one during the competition proper, in which he didn't bat, but bowled four overs, taking figures of 1–18.

Van Niekerk made his first-class debut in February 2009, against Border. From the tailend, he scored 4 not out in the first innings in which he batted.
