= Penang Sports Club =

Sports club in Georgetown, Malaysia

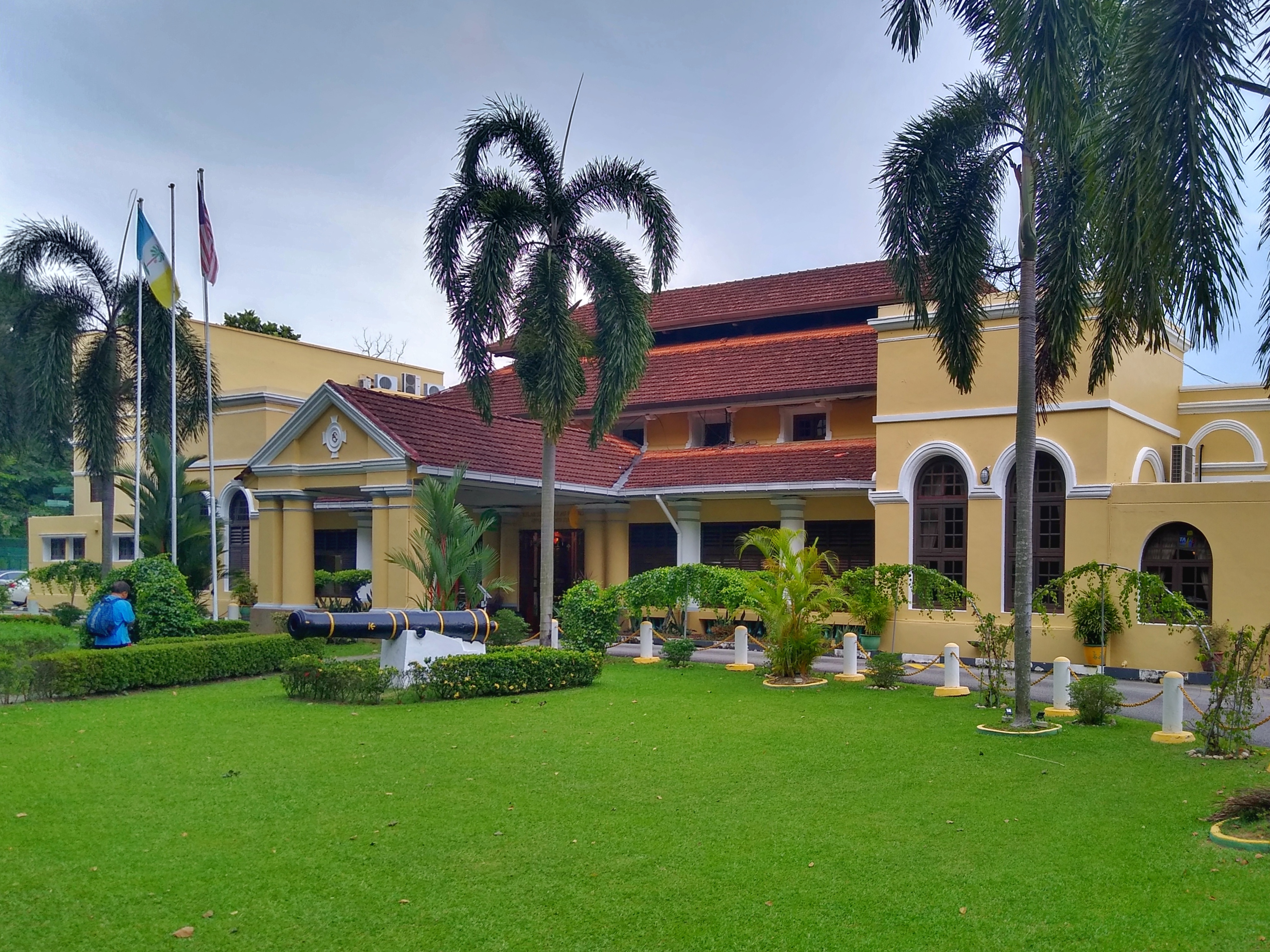
- Penang Sports Club main entrance in May 2022
- Interactive map of Penang Sports Club
- Location: Georgetown
- Country: Malaysia
- Coordinates: 5°25′14.32″N 100°18′14.15″E
- Establishment: 1936

Penang Sports Club is a private members sports club and cricket ground, established in the year 1936. It is located in the city of Georgetown covering a land area of about 16 acres (65,000 m^{2}). The ground has hosted cricket matches for Malaya and then Malaysia.

== See also ==
- Sport in Malaysia
