= Nadimuddin =

Bangladeshi cricketer (born 1990)

Personal information
- Born: August 30, 1990 (age 36); Narayangonj, Bangladesh
- Batting: Left-handed
- Role: Wicketkeeper
- Source: ESPNcricinfo, 16 June 2019

Nadimuddin (born 30 August 1990) is a Bangladeshi first-class cricketer who played for Chittagong Division.
