= Roy Adams (cricketer) =

South African cricketer (born 1989)

Personal information
- Born: 31 January 1989 (age 37); Caledon, Western Cape, South Africa
- Source: ESPNcricinfo, 28 September 2016

Roy Adams (born 31 January 1989) is a South African first-class cricketer. He was part of South Africa's squad for the 2008 Under-19 Cricket World Cup.
