= Tri-Series in Sri Lanka in 2009 =

Tri-Series in Sri Lanka in 2009-10
- Date: 8 September – 14 September 2009
- Location: Sri Lanka
- Result: Won by India
- Player of the series: Sachin Tendulkar
Teams
India	New Zealand	Sri Lanka
Captains
(India) Mahendra Singh Dhoni	(New Zealand) Daniel Vettori	(Sri Lanka) Kumar Sangakkara
Most runs
Sachin Tendulkar (211)	Grant Elliott (63)	Thilina Kandamby (172)
Most wickets
Harbhajan Singh (6)	Daniel Vettori (3); Shane Bond (3)	Angelo Mathews (6); Lasith Malinga (6)

The Compaq Cup is a One Day International cricket tournament which held in Sri Lanka from 8 September to 14 September 2009. The series involved the national teams of India, Sri Lanka and New Zealand.

== Squads ==
New Zealand	India	Sri Lanka
Daniel Vettori (c); Shane Bond; Neil Broom; Ian Butler; Grant Elliott; Martin Guptill; Gareth Hopkins (wk); Brendon McCullum; Nathan McCullum; Kyle Mills; Jacob Oram; Jeetan Patel; Jesse Ryder; Ross Taylor	Mahendra Singh Dhoni (c, wk); Yuvraj Singh (vc); Sachin Tendulkar; Rahul Dravid; Virat Kohli; Suresh Raina; Yusuf Pathan; Abhishek Nayar; Dinesh Karthik; Harbhajan Singh; Amit Mishra; Ashish Nehra; Praveen Kumar; Ravindra Jadeja	Kumar Sangakkara (c, wk); Mahela Jayawardene; Sanath Jayasuriya; Tillakaratne Dilshan; Thilan Samaraweera; Chamara Kapugedera; Thilina Kandamby; Upul Tharanga; Angelo Mathews; Muttiah Muralitharan; Ajantha Mendis; Thilan Thushara; Nuwan Kulasekara; Lasith Malinga; Dammika Prasad

== Matches ==
=== Group stage ===
Pos	Team	Pld	W	L	T	NR	Pts	NRR	For	Against
1	Sri Lanka	2	2	0	0	0	10	2.360	523/100	287/100
2	India	2	1	1	0	0	5	−1.040	324/90.3	462/100
3	New Zealand	2	0	2	0	0	0	−1.370	274/100	372/90.3

Source: ESPNcricinfo

8 September
Scorecard

Sri Lanka; 216/7 (50 overs)	v	New Zealand; 119 (36.1 overs)
Thilan Samaraweera 104 (124); Shane Bond 3/43 (10 overs)		Grant Elliott 41 (76); Lasith Malinga 4/28 (6.1 overs)

Sri Lanka won by 97 runs
R Premadasa Stadium, Colombo
Umpires: Asoka de Silva (cricketer) (SL) and Billy Doctrove (WI)
Player of the match: Thilan Samaraweera (SL)

- Points: Sri Lanka 5, New Zealand 0

Sri lanka won the toss and elected to bat first

11 September
Scorecard

New Zealand; 155 (46.3 overs)	v	India; 156/4 (40.3 overs)
Daniel Vettori 25 (36); Ashish Nehra 3/24 (8.3 overs)		Sachin Tendulkar 46 (55); Daniel Vettori 2/33 (10 overs)

India won by 6 wickets
R Premadasa Stadium, Colombo
Umpires: Billy Doctrove (WI) and Kumar Dharmasena (SL)
Player of the match: Ashish Nehra (Ind)

- Points: India 5, New Zealand 0
- Ashish Nehra took his 100th ODI wicket in this match

New Zealand won the toss and elected to bat first

12 September
Scorecard

Sri Lanka; 307/6 (50 overs)	v	India; 168 (37.2 overs)
Sanath Jayasuriya 98 (79); Suresh Raina 1/14 (3 overs)		Rahul Dravid 47 (56); Angelo Mathews 6/20 (6 overs)

Sri Lanka won by 139 runs
R Premadasa Stadium, Colombo
Umpires: Kumar Dharmasena (SL) and Billy Doctrove (WI)
Player of the match: Angelo Mathews (SL)

- Points: Sri Lanka 5, India 0

=== Final ===
14 September
14:30 (D/N)
Scorecard

India; 319/5 (50 overs)	v	Sri Lanka; 273 (46.4 overs)
Sachin Tendulkar 138 (133); Thilan Thushara 2/71 (10 overs)		Thilina Kandamby 66 (94); Harbhajan Singh 5/56 (9.4 overs)

India won by 46 runs
R. Premadasa Stadium, Colombo
Umpires: Asoka de Silva (SL) and Billy Doctrove (WI)
Player of the match: Sachin Tendulkar (Ind)

- India won the toss and elected to bat.
- India won the 2009 Compaq Cup.

== Media coverage ==
Television

- Arab Digital Distribution (live) – Middle East
- Ten Sports (live) – India, Sri Lanka and Pakistan
- DD National (live) – India (only India matches)
