= Adil Raza =

Pakistani cricketer (born 1991)

Personal information
- Born: 10 December 1991 (age 34); Gujranwala, Pakistan
- Source: ESPNcricinfo, 28 September 2016

Adil Raza (born 10 December 1991) is a Pakistani former first-class cricketer.

== Career ==
Raza was first included in the squad of the Pakistan national under-19 cricket team in 2006, when he was selected for the tour of India.

In October 2007, Raza debuted for Pakistan's Under-19 cricket team in a match against Australia's Under-19 team, contributing to a nine-wicket victory with a bowling performance of 4 for 36. Subsequently, his consistent performance in matches against Bangladesh's Under-19 team secured his place in Pakistan's 15-player squad for the 2008 Under-19 Cricket World Cup in Malaysia. During an Under-19 World Cup match, Raza took a six-wicket haul, a feat shared by other cricketers such as Shaheen Afridi and Awais Ali.

In October 2013, Raza was named in the United Bank Limited cricket team squad for the President's Trophy.
