= Daniel Childs =

South African cricketer (born 1988)

Personal information
- Full name: Daniel Barry Childs
- Born: 16 November 1988 (age 37); Cape Town, South Africa
- Batting: Right-handed
- Bowling: Right-arm fast-medium

Domestic team information
- Years: Team
- 2007–present: Boland
- First-class debut: 8 November 2007 Boland v KwaZulu-Natal
- List A debut: 14 October 2007 Boland v KwaZulu-Natal Inland

Career statistics
Competition	First-class	List A
Matches	34	19
Runs scored	47	2
Batting average	1.62	2.00
100s/50s	0/0	0/0
Top score	10	2*
Balls bowled	5,109	582
Wickets	84	12
Bowling average	28.57	43.41
5 wickets in innings	2	0
10 wickets in match	0	0
Best bowling	5–29	4–29
Catches/stumpings	7/–	2/–
- Source: CricketArchive, 2 April 2012

Daniel Barry Childs (born 16 November 1988) is a South African cricketer. A right-handed batsman and fast-medium pace bowler, he has played for the Boland province team since the 2007/08 season.
