= Neil Harrison (umpire) =

English cricket umpire

Personal information
- Full name: Neil Donald Harrison
- Born: 16 April 1962 (age 64); Wolverhampton, Staffordshire, England
- Role: Umpire

Umpiring information
- WODIs umpired: 4 (2009)
- Source: Cricinfo, 15 January 2022

Neil Donald Harrison (born 16 April 1962, Wolverhampton) is a top ranking cricket umpire based in Japan. He is one of two members of the International Cricket Council (ICC) East Asia Pacific Elite Umpires Panel from Japan. He officiated in five matches in the 2009 ICC Women's World Cup, in four as an on-field umpire and in the fifth as a TV umpire.

Harrison umpired four matches at the 2009 Women's Cricket World Cup.
