= Tiaan Louw =

Namibian cricketer (born 1988)

Personal information
- Full name: Tiaan Louw
- Born: 10 June 1988 (age 38); Namibia
- Batting: Right-handed
- Bowling: Right-arm medium

International information
- National side: Namibia

Domestic team information
- Years: Team
- 2009/10: Namibia

Career statistics
Competition	List A	Twenty20
Matches	2	1
Runs scored	12	19
Batting average	6.00	19.00
100s/50s	–/–	–/–
Top score	12	19
Balls bowled	–	–
Wickets	–	–
Bowling average	–	–
5 wickets in innings	–	–
10 wickets in match	–	–
Best bowling	–	–
Catches/stumpings	–/–	2/–
- Source: CricketArchive (subscription required), 16 October 2011

Tiaan Louw (born 10 June 1988) is a Namibian cricketer. He is a right-handed batsman and right-arm medium-pace bowler.

Louw made his debut for the Namibian Under-19 team in the Africa/East Asia and Pacific Championship in 2005, playing three games, but not batting in the tournament, in a competition in which Namibia were victorious, beating Uganda's Under-19 team in the final.

Two years later, he played for Namibia in the Africa Under-19 Championship, playing five games for the victorious Namibian side.

He played four games in the 2007-08 Under-19 World Cup, in which Namibia finished in tenth place.

Louw made his List A debut in the 2009–10 season, against the United Arab Emirates. He scored 12 runs in the match, which the United Arab Emirates won by two wickets.
