= 2008 Under-19 Cricket World Cup =

Cricket tournament in Malaysia

2008 ICC Under-19 Cricket World Cup
- Dates: 17 February – 2 March 2008
- Administrator: International Cricket Council
- Cricket format: Limited-overs (50 overs)
- Tournament format(s): Round-robin and Knockout
- Host: Malaysia
- Champions: India (2nd title)
- Runners-up: South Africa
- Participants: 16
- Matches: 44
- Player of the series: (New Zealand) Tim Southee
- Most runs: (India) Tanmay Srivastava (262)
- Most wickets: (South Africa) Wayne Parnell (18)

The 2008 ICC Under-19 Cricket World Cup was held in Malaysia from 17 February 2008 to 2 March 2008. It was the seventh edition of the Under-19 Cricket World Cup. The opening ceremony took place on 15 February 2008. The final was played between South Africa and India, with the latter winning the rain-affected match by 12 runs on the Duckworth–Lewis method.

== Venues ==
The matches took place at three locations: Kuala Lumpur, Johor and Penang. The venues used were:

'Kuala Lumpur

- Kinrara Academy Oval
- Royal Selangor Club Bukit Kiara
- Bayuemas Oval

Johor

- Johor Cricket Academy
- Maktab Perguruan Temenggong Ibrahim

Penang

- Penang Sports Club
- University of Science Malaysia

== Groups ==
The league stage of the tournament consisted of four groups of four teams each. Each team would play once with every team in the group. The groups would be stationed at their respective venues for the group stage. The figures in brackets indicate respective seedings.

Group A	Group B	Group C	Group D
Pakistan (1); Zimbabwe (8); New Zealand (9); Malaysia (H) (16)	India (2); West Indies (7); South Africa (10); Papua New Guinea (15)	Australia (3); Sri Lanka (6); Nepal (11); Namibia (14)	England (4); Bangladesh (5); Bermuda (12); Ireland (13)
Johor	Kuala Lumpur	Penang	Kuala Lumpur

== Group stage ==
=== Group A ===
All matches start at 0200 UTC.

Pos	Team	Pld	W	L	T	NR	Pts	NRR
1	Pakistan	3	3	0	0	0	6	1.765
2	New Zealand	3	2	1	0	0	4	1.407
3	Malaysia	3	1	2	0	0	2	−1.403
4	Zimbabwe	3	0	3	0	0	0	−1.700

17 February
Scorecard

Malaysia; 75 (24.4 overs)	v	Pakistan; 76/2 (9.3 overs)
Nik Azril Arifin 28 (43); Adil Raza 6/29 (10 overs)		Umar Amin 31 (25); Sarath Ananthasivam 1/13 (2 overs)

Pakistan U19 won by 8 wickets
Johor Cricket Academy, Johor
Umpires: Marais Erasmus and GA Pratapkumar
Player of the match: Adil Raza (Pak U19)

18 February
Scorecard

New Zealand; 221/8 (50 overs)	v	Zimbabwe; 123 (42.4 overs)
Corey Anderson 82 (95); Prince Masvaure 3/37 (10 overs)		Daniel Landman 51 (72); Tim Southee 5/11 (8.4 overs)

New Zealand U19 won by 98 runs
Johor Cricket Academy, Johor
Umpires: Lakani Oala and GA Pratapkumar
Player of the match: Corey Anderson (NZ U19)

19 February
Scorecard

Pakistan; 156 (47.1 overs)	v	New Zealand; 129 (47.2 overs)
Usman Salahuddin 53 (95); Trent Boult 2/21 (8 overs)		Harry Boam 38 (97); Ahmed Shehzad 3/35 (10 overs)

Pakistan U19 won by 27 runs
MPTI, Johor
Umpires: Clyde Duncan and Lakani Oala
Player of the match: Usman Salahuddin (Pak U19)

20 February
Scorecard

Malaysia; 194/8 (50 overs)	v	Zimbabwe; 124 (38.4 overs)
Ahmad Faiz 50 (77); Daniel Landman 3/34 (10 overs)		Tendai Mashonganyika 24 (42); Shahid Ali Khan 3/41 (8.4 overs)

Malaysia U19 won by 70 runs
MPTI, Johor
Umpires: Clyde Duncan and Marais Erasmus
Player of the match: Shahid Ali Khan (Mal U19)

21 February
Scorecard

Malaysia; 47 (17.1 overs)	v	New Zealand; 48/2 (11.1 overs)
Faizal Abu Hasan 9 (34); Trent Boult 7/20 (8.1 overs)		Kane Williamson 27 (37); Saravanan Raj 2/15 (4 overs)

New Zealand U19 won by 8 wickets
Johor Cricket Academy, Johor
Umpires: Marais Erasmus and GA Pratapkumar
Player of the match: Trent Boult (NZ U19)

22 February
Scorecard

Pakistan; 173/8 (50 overs)	v	Zimbabwe; 86 (29 overs)
Ali Asad 76* (124); Kyle Jarvis 3/40 (9 overs)		Justin Gaisford 18 (53); Mohammed Rameez 3/26 (7 overs)

Pakistan U19 won by 87 runs
MPTI, Johor
Umpires: Clyde Duncan and Lakani Oala
Player of the match: Ali Asad (Pak U19)

=== Group B ===
All matches started at 0200 UTC.

Pos	Team	Pld	W	L	T	NR	Pts	NRR
1	India	3	3	0	0	0	6	1.922
2	South Africa	3	2	1	0	0	4	1.066
3	West Indies	3	1	2	0	0	2	0.653
4	Papua New Guinea	3	0	3	0	0	0	−3.959

17 February
Scorecard

India; 280/5 (50 overs)	v	Papua New Guinea; 84 (27.5 overs)
Tanmay Srivastava 83 (76); John Reva 1/25 (4 overs)		Alfred Amini 26 (52); Iqbal Abdulla 3/2 (3 overs)

India U19 win by 195 runs
Kinrara Academy Oval, Kuala Lumpur
Umpires: Sarika Prasad and Ian Robinson
Player of the match: Tanmay Srivastava (Ind U19)

18 February
Scorecard

West Indies; 222/8 (50 overs)	v	South Africa; 223/7 (43.5 overs)
Kieran Powell 53 (50); Obus Pienaar 3/36 (10 overs)		Riley Rossouw 58* (74); Shamarh Brooks 4/39 (9 overs)

South Africa U19 win by 3 wickets
Kinrara Academy Oval, Kuala Lumpur
Umpires: Gary Baxter and Zameer Haider
Player of the match: Riley Rossouw (SA U19)

19 February
Scorecard

South Africa; 149 (30.1 overs)	v	India; 153/4 (42 overs)
Jonathan Vandiar 53 (45); Pradeep Sangwan 5/44 (10 overs)		Taruwar Kohli 54 (117); Wayne Parnell 2/27 (8 overs)

India U19 won by 6 wickets
Kinrara Academy Oval, Kuala Lumpur
Umpires: Gary Baxter and Sarika Prasad
Player of the match: Pradeep Sangwan (Ind U19)

20 February
Scorecard

West Indies; 319 (49.4 overs)	v	Papua New Guinea; 143 (37.1 overs)
Steven Jacobs 101 (86); Loa Nou 4/63 (9.4 overs)		Tony Ura 32 (21); Jason Dowes 4/25 (8 overs)

West Indies U19 won by 176 runs
Royal Selangor Club, Kuala Lumpur
Umpires: Ian Robinson and Zameer Haider
Player of the match: Steven Jacobs (WI U19)

21 February
Scorecard

Papua New Guinea; 125 (45 overs)	v	South Africa; 128/3 (15.1 overs)
Tanti Heni 35 (70); Jonathan Vandiar 4/27 (10 overs)		Pieter Malan 56 (46); Willie Gavera 2/33 (4 overs)

South Africa U19 won by 7 wickets
Kinrara Academy Oval, Kuala Lumpur
Umpires: Sarika Prasad and Ian Robinson
Player of the match: Jonathan Vandiar (SA U19)

22 February
Scorecard

India; 265/5 (50 overs)	v	West Indies; 215 (47.5 overs)
Virat Kohli 100 (74); Dawnley Grant 2/56 (10 overs)		Darren Bravo 43 (68); Siddarth Kaul 3/37 (8 overs)

India U19 won by 50 runs
Kinrara Academy Oval, Kuala Lumpur
Umpires: Gary Baxter and Zameer Haider
Player of the match: Virat Kohli (Ind U19)

=== Group C ===
All matches start at 0200 UTC.

Pos	Team	Pld	W	L	T	NR	Pts	NRR
1	Sri Lanka	3	3	0	0	0	6	1.912
2	Australia	3	2	1	0	0	4	1.342
3	Nepal	3	1	2	0	0	2	−1.027
4	Namibia	3	0	3	0	0	0	−2.100

17 February
Scorecard

Australia; 312 (48 overs)	v	Namibia; 163 (31 overs)
Michael Hill 124 (71); Ashley van Rooi 3/25 (5 overs)		Dawid Botha 56 (46); Steve Smith 4/41 (7 overs)

Australia U19 win by 149 runs
Penang Sports Club, Penang
Umpires: Paul Baldwin and Peter Hartley
Player of the match: Michael Hill (Aus U19)

18 February
Scorecard

Sri Lanka; 236/9 (50 overs)	v	Nepal; 175 (48.5 overs)
Sachith Pathirana 62 (60); Amrit Bhattarai 4/42 (10)		Mahesh Chhetri 39 (69); Sachith Pathirana 3/32 (10)

Sri Lanka U19 win by 61 runs
Penang Sports Club, Penang
Umpires: Roger Dill and Peter Hartley
Player of the match: Sachith Pathirana (SL U19)

19 February
Scorecard

Australia; 206 (49.3 overs)	v	Nepal; 110 (32.1 overs)
Phillip Hughes 46 (94); Paras Khadka 4/32 (9.3 overs)		Rahul Vishwakarma 33* (47); Clive Rose 3/21 (9 overs)

Australia U19 won by 96 runs
Universiti Sains Malaysia, Penang
Umpires: Roger Dill and Enamul Haque
Player of the match: James Pattinson (Aus U19)

20 February
Scorecard

Sri Lanka; 247/7 (50 overs)	v	Namibia; 84 (32.4 overs)
Lahiru Thirimanne 68 (84); Bernard Scholtz 2/32 (10 overs)		Dawid Botha 17 (27); Sachith Pathirana 4/31 (10 overs)

Sri Lanka U19 won by 163 runs
Universiti Sains Malaysia, Penang
Umpires: Paul Baldwin and Enamul Haque
Player of the match: Lahiru Thirimanne (SL U19)

21 February
Scorecard

Nepal; 164 (49.5 overs)	v	Namibia; 161 (49 overs)
Mahesh Chhetri 62 (133); Louis van der Westhuizen 2/17 (10 overs)		Louis van der Westhuizen 65 (75); Gyanendra Malla 2/3 (2 overs)

Nepal U19 won by 3 runs
Universiti Sains Malaysia, Penang
Umpires: Paul Baldwin and Peter Hartley
Player of the match: Mahesh Chhetri (Nep U19)

22 February
Scorecard

Australia; 172 (49.3 overs)	v	Sri Lanka; 175/5 (37.3 overs)
Steve Smith 36 (61); Navin Kavikara 3/20 (10 overs)		Dilshan Munaweera 43 (42); Clive Rose 2/23 (8.3 overs)

Sri Lanka U19 won by 5 wickets
Penang Sports Club, Penang
Umpires: Roger Dill and Enamul Haque
Player of the match: Dinesh Chandimal (SL U19)

=== Group D ===
All matches start at 0200 UTC.

Pos	Team	Pld	W	L	T	NR	Pts	NRR
1	Bangladesh	3	3	0	0	0	6	2.078
2	England	3	2	1	0	0	4	1.861
3	Bermuda	3	1	2	0	0	2	−2.285
4	Ireland	3	0	3	0	0	0	−2.264

17 February
Scorecard

Ireland; 109 (31.2 overs)	v	England; 110/0 (15.5 overs)
Christopher Dougherty 34 (64); Steven Finn 3/21 (8 overs)		James Taylor 52* (63); Ben Ackland 0/12 (1.5 overs)

England U19 win by 10 wickets
Bayuemas Oval, Kuala Lumpur
Umpires: Steve Davis and Jeff Luck
Player of the match: Steven Finn (Eng U19)

18 February
Scorecard

Bangladesh; 260/8 (50 overs)	v	Bermuda; 82 (26.2 overs)
Nasir Hossain 84 (95); Malachi Jones 2/64 (10 overs)		Rodney Trott 20 (37); Suhrawadi Shuvo 4/9 (7.2 overs)

Bangladesh win by 178 runs
Bayuemas Oval, Kuala Lumpur
Umpires: Steve Davis and Tyron Wijewardene
Player of the match: Nasir Hossain (Ban U19)

19 February
Scorecard

England; 56/0 (10.4 overs)	v	Bermuda; 55 (28.5 overs)
James Taylor 43(52)		Chris Douglas 21(35); Liam Dawson 3/15 (7 overs)

England U19 won by 10 wickets
Royal Selangor Club, Kuala Lumpur
Umpires: Buddhi Pradhan and Tyron Wijewardene
Player of the match: Liam Dawson (Eng U19)

20 February
Scorecard

Ireland; 123 (43.4 overs)	v	Bangladesh; 124/2 (22.3 overs)
James Shannon 31 (73); Mahmudul Hasan 4/17 (6.4 overs)		Ashraful Hossain 71* (79); James Hall 1/8 (5 overs)

Bangladesh U19 won by 8 wickets
Bayuemas Oval, Kuala Lumpur
Umpires: Jeff Luck and Buddhi Pradhan
Player of the match: Mahmudul Hasan (Ban U19)

21 February
Scorecard

Bermuda; 221/9 (50 overs)	v	Ireland; 201 (48.4 overs)
Rodney Trott 64 (94); James Hall 3/44 (10 overs)		Christopher Dougherty 70 (108); Chris Douglas 5/40 (10 overs)

Bermuda U19 won by 20 runs
Royal Selangor Club, Kuala Lumpur
Umpires: Steve Davis and Jeff Luck
Player of the match: Chris Douglas (Ber U19)

22 February
Scorecard

Bangladesh; 149 (42 overs)	v	England; 136 (47.4 overs)
Suhrawadi Shuvo 56* (96); James Harris 5/29 (10 overs)		Dan Redfern 26 (66); Mahmudul Hasan 2/16 (10 overs)

Bangladesh U19 won by 13 runs
Royal Selangor Club, Kuala Lumpur
Umpires: Buddhi Pradhan and Tyron Wijewardene
Player of the match: Suhrawadi Shuvo (Ban U19)

== Quarter-finals ==
=== Super Quarter-finals ===
24 February
Scorecard

England; 146 (46 overs)	v	India; 149/3 (39.1 overs)
James Taylor 41 (88); Iqbal Abdulla 3/29 (9 overs)		Taruwar Kohli 63* (111); Tom Westley 2/30 (6 overs)

India U19 won by 7 wickets
Kinrara Academy Oval, Kuala Lumpur
Umpires: Gary Baxter and Marais Erasmus
Player of the match: Taruwar Kohli (Ind U19)

24 February
Scorecard

South Africa; 242 (50 overs)	v	Bangladesh; 41 (11.4 overs)
Wayne Parnell 57 (49); Subashis Roy 2/31 (10 overs)		Nasir Hossain 17 (20); Wayne Parnell 6/8 (5 overs)

South Africa U19 won by 201 runs
Bayuemas Oval, Kuala Lumpur
Umpires: GA Pratapkumar and Zameer Haider
Player of the match: Wayne Parnell (SA U19)

25 February
Scorecard

New Zealand; 213 (49.5 overs)	v	Sri Lanka; 134 (42.1 overs)
George Worker 47 (94); Roshen Silva 3/39 (10 overs)		Sachith Pathirana 42 (63); Nick Beard 3/15 (6 overs)

New Zealand U19 won by 79 runs
Royal Selangor Club, Kuala Lumpur
Umpires: Enamul Haque and Ian Robinson (cricket umpire)
Player of the match: Tim Southee (NZ U19)

25 February
Scorecard

Australia; 129 (47.2 overs)	v	Pakistan; 130/4 (27.5 overs)
James Pattinson 34* (57); Adil Raza 3/26 (8 overs)		Ali Asad 63*; Josh Hazlewood 2/31 (5.5 overs)

Pakistan U19 won by 6 wickets
Kinrara Academy Oval, Kuala Lumpur
Umpires: Peter Hartley and Tyron Wijewardene
Player of the match: Ali Asad (Pak U19)

=== Plate Quarter-finals ===
24 February
Scorecard

Malaysia; 144 (47.2 overs)	v	Namibia; 147/1 (31.1 overs)
Ahmad Faiz 41 (60); Keady Strauss 3/15 (6.2 overs)		Raymond van Schoor 60* (96); Sharul Nizam 1/32 (10 overs)

Namibia U19 won by 9 wickets
Johor Cricket Academy Oval, Johor
Umpires: Paul Baldwin and Buddhi Pradhan
Player of the match: Dawid Botha (Nam U19)

24 February
Scorecard

Nepal; 158 (45.1 overs)	v	Zimbabwe; 59 (27.2 overs)
Puspa Thapa 40 (48); Stewart Matsika 3/34 (10 overs)		Tinashe Chimbambo 20 (34); Paras Khadka 3/13 (7 overs)

Nepal U19 won by 99 runs
Institute Perguruan Temenggong Ibramhim, Johor
Umpires: Clyde Duncan and Lakani Oala
Player of the match: Paras Khadka (Nep U19)

25 February
Scorecard

Ireland; 154/9 (50 overs)	v	West Indies; 158/3 (23.1 overs)
James Hall 45 (112); Steven Jacobs 3/18 (10 overs)		Kieran Powell 50 (46); Greg Thompson 2/51 (6 overs)

West Indies U19 won by 7 wickets
Institute Perguruan Temenggong Ibramhim, Johor
Umpires: Steve Davis and Roger Dill
Player of the match: Steven Jacobs (WI U19)

25 February
Scorecard

Bermuda; 102 (34.2 overs)	v	Papua New Guinea; 108/3 (18.4 overs)
Rodney Trott 23 (45); Joel Tom 3/26 (8 overs)		Tony Ura 76 (55); Rodney Trott 1/24 (5 overs)

Papua New Guinea U19 won by 7 wickets
Johor Cricket Academy Oval, Johor
Umpires: Jeff Luck and Sarika Prasad
Player of the match: Tony Ura (PNG U19)

== Semi-finals ==
=== Super Semi-finals ===
27 February
Scorecard

New Zealand; 205/8 (50 overs)	v	India; 191/7 (41.3 overs)
Corey Anderson 70 (67); Virat Kohli 2/27 (7 overs)		Shreevats Goswami 51 (76); Tim Southee 4/29 (9 overs)

India U19 won by 3 wickets (D/L method)
Kinrara Academy Oval, Kuala Lumpur
Umpires: Marais Erasmus and Peter Hartley
Player of the match: Virat Kohli (Ind U19)

- India U19 were set a revised target of 191 runs from 43 overs due to rain.

29 February and 1 March
Scorecard

South Africa; 260/8 (50 overs)	v	Pakistan; 153 (39.3 overs)
JJ Smuts 58 (63); Imad Wasim 3/44 (10 overs)		Ahmed Shehzad 60 (85); Yaseen Vallie 4/25 (8.3 overs)

South Africa U19 won by 98 runs (D/L method)
Kinrara Academy Oval, Kuala Lumpur
Umpires: Steve Davis and Tyron Wijewardene
Player of the match: Yaseen Vallie (SA U19)

- Pakistan U19 were set a revised target of 252 runs from 47 overs due to rain.

=== 5th Place Semi-Finals ===
27 February
Scorecard

Sri Lanka; 241/4 (50 overs)	v	England; 204/3 (44.1 overs)
Sachith Pathirana 97 (91); Tom Westley 2/38 (9 overs)		Tom Westley 58 (77); Roshen Silva 2/38 (7 overs)

England U19 won by 8 runs (D/L method)
Royal Selangor Club, Kuala Lumpur
Umpires: Gary Buxter and GA Pratapkumar
Player of the match: Tom Westley (Eng U19)

28 February
Scorecard

Bangladesh; 115 (41.2 overs)	v	Australia; 18/0 (6 overs)
Amit Majumder 43 (79); Clive Rose 2/18 (10 overs)		Kirk Pascoe 4 (15)

No result
Bayuemas Oval, Kuala Lumpur
Umpires: Ian Robinson and Zameer Haider

=== Plate Semi-finals ===
26 February
Scorecard

Nepal; 143/8 (34 overs)	v	Namibia; 139/9 (34 overs)
Paras Khadka 44 (63); Sean Silver 3/20 (5 overs)		Raymond van Schoor 48 (73); Raj Shrestha 2/23 (6 overs)

Nepal U19 won by 4 runs
Johor Cricket Academy Oval, Johor
Umpires: Paul Baldwin and Sarika Prasad
Player of the match: Paras Khadka (Nep U19)

27 February
Scorecard

Papua New Guinea; 89 (36.5 overs)	v	West Indies; 90/4 (15.3 overs)
John Reva 14 (36); Shamarh Brooks 2/9 (7 overs)		Kieran Powell 37 (37); Loa Nou 2/8 (3.3 overs)

West Indies U19 won by 6 wickets
Institute Perguruan Temenggong Ibrahim, Johor
Umpires: Roger Dill and Jeff Luck
Player of the match: Shamarh Brooks (WI U19)

=== 13th place Semi-finals ===
26 February
Scorecard

Zimbabwe; 186/6 (34 overs)	v	Malaysia; 142 (28.5 overs)
Daniel Landman 45 (22); Nik Azril Arafin 2/23 (7 overs)		Aminuddin Ramly 70 (67); Edzai Jaure 3/39 (7 overs)

Zimbabwe U19 won by 44 runs
Institute Perguruan Temenggong Ibrahim, Johor
Umpires: Clyde Duncan and Buddhi Pradhan
Player of the match: Daniel Landman (Mas U19)

29 February
Scorecard

Ireland; 236/7 (50 overs)	v	Bermuda; 167 (48.1 overs)
James Hall 75 (82); Rodney Trott 4/37 (10 overs)		Rodney Trott 53 (73); Greg Thompson 5/26 (10 overs)

Ireland U19 won by 69 runs
Johor Cricket Academy Oval, Johor
Umpires: Lakani Oala and Sarika Prasad
Player of the match: Greg Thompson (Ire U19)

== Finals ==
=== 13th Place Final ===
1 March
Scorecard

Zimbabwe; 99/9 (27 overs)	v	Ireland; 100/4 (23.2 overs)
Reginald Nehonde 43 (61); Andrew Britton 4/14 (6 overs)		James Hall 32 (29); Stewart Matsika 2/14 (5 overs)

Ireland U19 won by 6 wickets
Johor Cricket Academy Oval, Johor
Umpires: Jeff Luck and Buddhi Pradhan
Player of the match: Andrew Britton (Ire U19)

=== Plate Final ===
1 March
Scorecard

Nepal; 74 (25.3 overs)	v	West Indies; 78/3 (14.2 overs)
Sagar Khadka 17 (55); Jason Dawes 4/18 (6 overs)		Darren Bravo 24 (15); Amrit Bhattarai 2/25 (6 overs)

West Indies U19 won by 7 wickets
Bayuemas Oval, Kuala Lumpur
Umpires: Paul Baldwin and GA Pratapkumar
Player of the match: Jason Dawes (WI U19)

=== Fifth-place final ===
1 March
Scorecard

Australia; 106/7 (24 overs)	v	England; 47/2 (10.5 overs)
Kirk Pascoe 55 (67); James Harris 2/8 (5 overs)		Billy Godleman 20 (19); Clive Rose 1/4 (1.5 overs)

No result (England won the fifth-place play-off)
Royal Selangor Club, Kuala Lumpur
Umpires: Clyde Duncan and Zameer Haider

=== Final ===
099 March
Scorecard

India; 159 (45.4 overs)	v	South Africa; 103/8 (25 overs)
Tanmay Srivastava 46 (74); Wayne Parnell 2/21 (7.4 overs)		Reeza Hendricks 35 (43); Ajitesh Argal 2/7 (5 overs)

India U19 won by 12 runs (D/L method)
Kinrara Academy Oval, Kuala Lumpur
Umpires: Gary Baxter (NZ) and Peter Hartley (Eng)
Player of the match: Ajitesh Argal (Ind U19)

- South Africa won the toss and elected to field.
- South Africa U19 were set a revised target of 116 runs from 25 overs due to rain.

== Final standings ==
Position	Team
1	India
2	South Africa
3	Pakistan
4	New Zealand
5	England
6	Australia
7	Bangladesh
8	Sri Lanka
9	West Indies
10	Nepal
11	Namibia
12	Papua New Guinea
13	Ireland
14	Zimbabwe
15	Bermuda
16	Malaysia (H)
