= Viliame Yabaki =

Fijian cricketer (born 1991)

Personal information
- Born: 27 March 1991 (age 35)
- Batting: Right-handed
- Bowling: Right-arm leg break

International information
- National side: Fiji
- Source: Cricinfo, 7 September 2015

Viliame Yabaki (born 27 March 1991) is a Fijian cricketer. He played in the 2015 ICC World Cricket League Division Six tournament. In August 2018, he was named in Fiji's squad for Group A of the 2018–19 ICC World Twenty20 East Asia-Pacific Qualifier tournament.
