= James Hall (Irish cricketer) =

Irish cricketer (born 1988)

Personal information
- Full name: James Douglas Hall
- Born: 19 October 1988 (age 38); Preston, Lancashire, England
- Batting: Right-handed
- Bowling: Right-arm off break

International information
- National side: Ireland
- ODI debut (cap 32): 1 July 2010 v Kenya
- Last ODI: 9 July 2010 v Netherlands

Domestic team information
- Years: Team
- 2008–2009: Ireland
- 2013: Northern Knights

Career statistics
| Competition | ODI | FC | LA |
|---|---|---|---|
| Matches | 3 | 1 | 7 |
| Runs scored | 28 | 7 | 91 |
| Batting average | 9.33 | 7.00 | 13.00 |
| 100s/50s | 0/0 | 0/0 | 0/0 |
| Top score | 15 | 7 | 27 |
| Balls bowled | – | – | 32 |
| Wickets | – | – | 1 |
| Bowling average | – | – | 22.00 |
| 5 wickets in innings | – | – | 0 |
| 10 wickets in match | – | – | 0 |
| Best bowling | – | – | 1/22 |
| Catches/stumpings | 0/– | 1/– | 0/– |
- Source: CricketArchive, 27 January 2025

James Douglas Hall (born 19 October 1988) is an English-born former Irish international cricketer. He is a right-handed batsman and a right-arm off-break bowler. Hall started his career in 2005 playing for Ireland's Under-17s team in Division One of the European Under-17 Championship, though after playing three matches in this competition, he moved up to the Under-19s, for whom he later played in the ICC Under-19 World Cup.
