= 2011 Americas Twenty20 Division One =

2011 ICC World Cricket League Americas Region Twenty20 Division One
- Administrator: International Cricket Council
- Cricket format: Twenty20
- Tournament format: Round-robin
- Host: United States
- Champions: Canada
- Participants: 6
- Matches: 15
- Most runs: (Bermuda) Lionel Cann (205)
- Most wickets: (United States) Bhim George (13)
- Official website: ICC Americas Region

The 2011 ICC World Cricket League Americas Region Twenty20 Division One is a cricket tournament that took place from 18 to 23 July 2011. The United States of America hosted the event.

== Teams ==
Teams that qualified are as follows:

- Argentina
- Bermuda
- Canada
- Cayman Islands
- Suriname
- United States

== Squads ==
Argentina	Bermuda	Canada
Esteban MacDermott (c); Pedro Bruno; Henan Fennell; Alejandro Ferguson (wk); Pablo Ferguson; Donald Forrester; Agustin Husain; Bernardo Irigoyen; Lautaro Musiani; Benjamin Precious; Pablo Ryan; Gary Savage; Alejo Tissera; Hernan Williams	David Hemp (c); Oronde Bascome; Damali Bell; Lionel Cann; Fiqre Crockwell; Joshua Gilbert; Dennico Hollis; Malachi Jones; Kamau Leverock; Dean Minors (wk); George O'Brien; Oliver Pitcher; Sam Robinson; Rodney Trott	Jimmy Hansra (c); Trevin Bastiampillai; Grant Broadhurst; Satsimranjit Dhindsa; Hamza Tariq (wk); Junaid Siddiqui; Deepak Pabla; Cecil Pervez; Jason Sandher; Parveen Saroye; Jonathan Snow; Usman Limbada; Khushroo Wadia; Zahid Hussain

Cayman Islands	Suriname	United States
Abali Hoilett (c); Kevin Bazil; Pearson Best; Marlon Bryan; Kervin Ebanks; Steve Gordon; Patrick McConvey; Zachary McLaughlin; Alessandro Morris; Ricardo Roach; Ramon Sealy (wk); Troy Taylor; Omar Willis; Conroy Wright	Troy Dudnath (c); Mohindra Boodram; Charles Douglas; Sauid Drepaul; Arun Gokoel; Giovani Gokoel; Kemraj Hardat (wk); Radjeev Jagroep; Sanjay Oemraw; Deoraj Sewanan; Vishwar Shaw; Vishaul Singh; Tariq Islam	Steve Massiah (c); Quasen Alfred; Timroy Allen; Orlando Baker; Akeem Dodson (wk); Bhim George; Adrian Gordon; Aditya Mishra; Muhammad Ghous; Sushil Nadkarni; Nauman Mustafa; Japen Patel; Gowkaran Roopnarine; Samarth Shah; Usman Shuja

== Fixtures ==
=== Points Table ===
Team	P	W	L	T	NR	Points	NRR
Canada	5	5	0	0	0	10	+2.073
United States	5	4	1	0	0	8	+1.916
Bermuda	5	3	2	0	0	6	+0.087
Cayman Islands	5	2	3	0	0	4	-1.152
Suriname	5	1	4	0	0	2	-1.527
Argentina	5	0	5	0	0	0	-1.081

=== Matches ===
18 July
9.30 a.m.
Scorecard

Argentina; 93/8 (20 overs)	v	Bermuda; 99/7 (19.3 overs)
Gary Savage 38 (46); Malachi Jones 3/10 (4 overs)		Lionel Cann 55* (42); Esteban MacDermott 3/9 (4 overs)

Bermuda won by 3 wickets
Central Broward Regional Park Stadium Turf Ground, Lauderhill
Umpires: Karran Bayney (Can) and Ashook Brijcoomar (Can)
Player of the match: Lionel Cann (Ber)

- Argentina won the toss and elected to bat.

18 July
1.30 p.m.
Scorecard

United States; 124/2 (13 overs)	v	Suriname; 58/6 (11.2 overs)
Gowkaran Roopnarine 59* (47); Sanjay Oemraw 1/14 (3 overs)		Mohindra Boodram 25 (24); Bhim George 2/16 (2 overs)

United States of America won by 50 runs (D/L)
Central Broward Regional Park Stadium Turf Ground, Lauderhill
Umpires: Roger Dill (Ber) and Steven Douglas (Ber)
Player of the match: Gowkaran Roopnarine (USA)

- United States of America won the toss and elected to bat.

18 July
5.30 p.m. (D/N)
Scorecard

Canada; 130/8 (20 overs)	v	Cayman Islands; 66/7 (20 overs)
Khushroo Wadia 40 (31); Alessandro Morris 3/21 (3 overs)		Pearson Best 21 (29); Zahid Hussain 4/7 (4 overs)

Canada won by 64 runs
Central Broward Regional Park Stadium Turf Ground, Lauderhill
Umpires: Sameer Bandekar (Ind) and Hubert Smythe (Cay)
Player of the match: Zahid Hussain (Can)

- Canada won the toss and elected to bat.

19 July
9.30 a.m.
Scorecard

Cayman Islands; 72 all out (19.4 overs)	v	United States; 73/3 (13.5 overs)
Steve Gordon 26 (36); Timroy Allen 4/8 (3.4 overs)		Aditya Mishra 28* (38); Kervin Ebanks 2/7 (3 overs)

United States of America won by 7 wickets
Central Broward Regional Park Stadium Turf Ground, Lauderhill
Umpires: Roger Dill (Ber) and Steven Douglas (Ber)
Player of the match: Timroy Allen (USA)

- United States of America won the toss and elected to field.

19 July
1.30 p.m.
Scorecard

Bermuda; 160/4 (20 overs)	v	Suriname; 41/3 (5 overs)
Lionel Cann 63 (35); Troy Dudnath 2/40 (4 overs)		Arun Gokoel 18* (12); George O'Brien 1/5 (1 over)

Bermuda won by 8 runs (D/L)
Central Broward Regional Park Stadium Turf Ground, Lauderhill
Umpires: Karran Bayney (Can) and Sylvan Taylor (USA0
Player of the match: Lionel Cann (Ber)

- Bermuda won the toss and elected to bat.

19 July
5.30 p.m. (D/N)
Scorecard

Argentina; 54/8 (8 overs)	v	Canada; 55/1 (7.1 overs)
Alejandro Ferguson 22 (12); Grant Broadhurst 1/4 (1 over)		Jimmy Hansra 30* (23); Benjamin Precious 1/2 (1 over)

Canada won by 9 wickets
Central Broward Regional Park Stadium Turf Ground, Lauderhill
Umpires: S Kalloo (USA) and Hubert Smythe (Cay)

- Canada won the toss and elected to field.

20 July
9.30 a.m.
Scorecard

Suriname; 95 (19.5 overs)	v	Cayman Islands; 96/3 (19 overs)
Arun Gokoel 14 (13); Kevin Bazil 3/9 (4 overs)		Zachary McLaughlin 37 (52); Sanjay Oemraw 1/14 (4 overs)

Cayman Islands won by 7 wickets
Central Broward Regional Park Stadium Turf Ground, Lauderhill
Umpires: Roger Dill (Ber) and Steven Douglas (Ber)
Player of the match: Kevin Bazil (Cay)

- Cayman Islands won the toss and elected to field.

20 July
1.30 p.m.
Scorecard

United States; 150/8 (20 overs)	v	Argentina; 84/6 (20 overs)
Aditya Mishra 41 (27); Alejo Tissera 3/16 (3 overs)		Pablo Ferguson 17 (29); Bhim George 5/9 (4 overs)

United States of America won by 66 runs
Central Broward Regional Park Stadium Turf Ground, Lauderhill
Umpires: Karran Bayney (Can) and Ashook Brijcoomar (Can)
Player of the match: Bhim George (USA)

- United States of America won the toss and elected to bat.

20 July
5.30 p.m. (D/N)
Scorecard

Bermuda; 79/9 (20 overs)	v	Canada; 40/1 (7.3 overs)
Malachi Jones 29* (34); Grant Broadhurst 3/8 (4 overs)		Jason Sandher 17* (22)

Canada won by 15 runs (D/L)
Central Broward Regional Park Stadium Turf Ground, Lauderhill
Umpires: S Kalloo (USA) and Hubert Smythe (Cay)
Player of the match: Grant Broadhurst (Canada)

- Bermuda won the toss and elected to bat.

22 July
9.30 a.m.
Scorecard

Argentina; 83 (19 overs)	v	Suriname; 87/5 (20 overs)
Donald Forrester 15 (20); Mohindra Boodram 5/14 (2 overs)		Arun Gokoel 36* (39); Donald Forrester 2/23 (4 overs)

Suriname won by 5 wickets
Central Broward Regional Park Stadium Turf Ground, Lauderhill
Umpires: Sameer Bandekar (Ind) and S Kalloo (USA)
Player of the match: Mohindra Boodram (Sur)

- Argentina won the toss and elected to bat.

22 July
1.30 p.m.
Scorecard

Cayman Islands; 87/8 (20 overs)	v	Bermuda; 88/0 (15.1 overs)
Steve Gordon 23 (23); Kamau Leverock 3/13 (4 overs)		Lionel Cann 54* (43)

Bermuda won by 10 wickets
Central Broward Regional Park Stadium Turf Ground, Lauderhill
Umpires: Ashok Brijcoomar (Can) and Sylvan Taylor (USA)
Player of the match: Lionel Cann (Ber)

- Bermuda won the toss and elected to field.

22 July
5.30 p.m. (D/N)
Scorecard

Canada; 131 (19.2 overs)	v	United States; 121/9 (20 overs)
Khushroo Wadia 56 (35); Orlando Baker 3/13 (3 overs)		Sushil Nadkarni 40 (35); Satsimranjit Dhindsa 3/27 (4 overs)

Canada won by 10 runs
Central Broward Regional Park Stadium Turf Ground, Lauderhill
Umpires: Roger Dill (Ber) and Steven Douglas (Ber)
Player of the match: Khushroo Wadia (Can)

- Canada won the toss and elected to bat.

23 July
9.30 a.m.
Scorecard

Bermuda; 91/7 (20 overs)	v	United States; 92/3 (16 overs)
Lionel Cann 32 (29); Bhim George 2/12 (4 overs)		Sushil Nadkarni 39* (43); Joshua Gilbert 2/16 (4 overs)

United States of America won by 7 wickets
Central Broward Regional Park Stadium Turf Ground, Lauderhill
Umpires: Karran Bayney (Can) and Ashok Brijcoomar (Can)
Player of the match: Sushil Nadkarni (USA)

- United States of America won the toss and elected to field.

23 July
1.30 p.m.
Scorecard

Argentina; 90/7 (20 overs)	v	Cayman Islands; 93/6 (19.4 overs)
Donald Forrester 22* (19); Alessandro Morris 2/20 (4 overs)		Steve Gordon 22 (38); Alejo Tissera 2/14 (2 overs)

Cayman Islands won by 4 wickets
Central Broward Regional Park Stadium Turf Ground, Lauderhill
Umpires: S Kalloo (USA) and Hubert Smythe (Cay)
Player of the match: Steve Gordon (Cay)

- Cayman Islands won the toss and elected to field.

23 July
5.30 p.m. (D/N)
Scorecard

Canada; 138/4 (20 overs)	v	Suriname; 77/7 (20 overs)
Khushroo Wadia 75 (56); Arun Gokoel 1/8 (2 overs)		Vishwar Shaw 18 (28); Satsimranjit Dhindsa 2/8 (4 overs)

Canada won by 61 runs
Central Broward Regional Park Stadium Turf Ground, Lauderhill
Umpires: Sameer Bandekar (Ind) and Steven Douglas (Ber)
Player of the match: Khushroo Wadia (Can)

- Suriname won the toss and elected to field.

== Statistics ==
=== Highest team totals ===
The following table lists the six highest team scores.

Team	Total	Opponent	Ground
Bermuda	160/4	Suriname	Central Broward Regional Park Stadium Turf Ground, Lauderhill
United States	150/8	Argentina	Central Broward Regional Park Stadium Turf Ground, Lauderhill
Canada	138/4	Suriname	Central Broward Regional Park Stadium Turf Ground, Lauderhill
Canada	131	United States	Central Broward Regional Park Stadium Turf Ground, Lauderhill
Canada	130/8	Cayman Islands	Central Broward Regional Park Stadium Turf Ground, Lauderhill
United States	124/2	Suriname	Central Broward Regional Park Stadium Turf Ground, Lauderhill

=== Most runs ===
The top five highest run scorers (total runs) are included in this table.

Player	Team	Runs	Inns	Avg	S/R	HS	100s	50s	4s	6s
Lionel Cann	Bermuda	205	5	68.33	133.11	63	0	3	12	9
Khushroo Wadia	Canada	180	5	45.00	130.43	75*	0	2	17	5
Sushil Nadkarni	United States	149	5	37.25	107.19	40	0	0	12	6
Gowkaran Roopnarine	United States	102	4	34.00	115.90	59*	0	1	7	3
David Hemp	Bermuda	99	5	24.75	70.71	50	0	1	4	0

=== Highest scores ===
This table contains the top five highest scores made by a batsman in a single innings.

Player	Team	Score	Balls	4s	6s	Opponent	Ground
Khushroo Wadia	Canada	75*	56	5	3	Suriname	Central Broward Regional Park Stadium Turf Ground, Lauderhill
Lionel Cann	Bermuda	63	35	5	2	Suriname	Central Broward Regional Park Stadium Turf Ground, Lauderhill
Gowkaran Roopnarine	United States	59*	47	5	1	Suriname	Central Broward Regional Park Stadium Turf Ground, Lauderhill
Khushroo Wadia	Canada	56	35	8	1	United States	Central Broward Regional Park Stadium Turf Ground, Lauderhill
Lionel Cann	Bermuda	55*	42	1	3	Argentina	Central Broward Regional Park Stadium Turf Ground, Lauderhill

=== Most wickets ===
The following table contains the five leading wicket-takers.

Player	Team	Wkts	Mts	Ave	S/R	Econ	BBI
Bhim George	United States	13	5	5.76	8.3	4.16	5/9
Zahid Hussain	Canada	9	5	5.00	10.0	3.00	4/7
Satsimranjit Dhindsa	Canada	8	5	10.75	13.5	4.77	3/27
Junaid Siddiqui	Canada	8	5	11.62	13.5	5.16	3/20
Alessandro Morris	Cayman Islands	6	5	13.33	15.8	5.05	3/21

=== Best bowling figures ===
This table lists the top five players with the best bowling figures.

Player	Team	Overs	Figures	Opponent	Ground
Bhim George	United States	4.0	5/9	Argentina	Central Broward Regional Park Stadium Turf Ground, Lauderhill
Mohindra Boodram	Suriname	2.0	5/14	Argentina	Central Broward Regional Park Stadium Turf Ground, Lauderhill
Zahid Hussain	Canada	4.0	4/7	Cayman Islands	Central Broward Regional Park Stadium Turf Ground, Lauderhill
Timroy Allen	United States	3.4	4/8	Cayman Islands	Central Broward Regional Park Stadium Turf Ground, Lauderhill
Grant Broadhurst	Canada	4.0	3/8	Bermuda	Central Broward Regional Park Stadium Turf Ground, Lauderhill

== See also ==
- 2012 ICC World Twenty20 Qualifier
