= 2007 ICC World Cricket League Division Two =

2007 ICC WCL Division two
- Administrator(s): ICC
- Cricket format: List A
- Tournament format(s): Round-robin and knockout
- Host(s): Namibia
- Champions: United Arab Emirates
- Participants: 6
- Matches: 18
- Most runs: (Namibia) Gerrie Snyman 588
- Most wickets: (United Arab Emirates) Arshad Ali 17

The 2007 ICC World Cricket League Division Two is a tournament that forms part of the ICC World Cricket League. It was played in Windhoek, Namibia, between 24 November and 1 December 2007, and forms part of the qualification structure for the 2011 Cricket World Cup.

== Teams ==
- Denmark
- Namibia
- Oman
- United Arab Emirates
- Uganda (Promoted after winning 2007 ICC World Cricket League Division Three)
- Argentina (Promoted after second place in 2007 ICC World Cricket League Division Three)

The top four teams from this tournament progressed to the 2009 ICC World Cup Qualifier, which was played in the United Arab Emirates in April 2009. The 5th and 6th placed teams played in Division Three of the World Cricket League in early 2009.

== Squads ==
Argentina Coach: Hamish Barton	Denmark Coach: Peter Klokker	Namibia Coach: Johan Rudolph
Esteban MacDermott (c); Alejandro Ferguson (vc); Pedro Bruno; Agustin Casime; Pablo Ferguson; Donald Forrester; Bernardo Irigoyan; Diego Lord; Esteban Nino; Matias Paterlini; Pablo Ryan; Gary Savage; Martin Siri; Hernan Williams	Frederik Klokker (c); David Borchersen; Bobby Chawla; Henrik Hansen; Thomas Hansen; Lars Hedegaard; Morten Hedegaard; Mickey Lund; Johan Malcolm; Max Overgaard; Carsten Pedersen; Michael Pedersen; Anders Rasmussen; Bashir Shah	Bjorn Kotze (c); Dawid Botha; Jan-Berrie Burger; Kola Burger; Michael Durandt; Louis Klazinga; Deon Kotze; Nicolaas Scholtz; Sean Silver; Gerrie Snyman; Louis van der Westhuizen; Raymond van Schoor; Ian van Zyl; Tobias Verwey
Oman Coach: Mazhar Khan	Uganda Coach: Sam Walusimbi	United Arab Emirates Coach: Kabir Khan
Ameet Sampat (c); Hemal Mehta (vc); Aamer Ali; Adnan Ilyas; Awal Khan; Farhan Khan; Hemin Desai; Khalid Moosa; Mohammad Asif; Nilesh Parmar; Sultan Ahmed; Tariq Hussain; Vaibhav Wategaonkar; Zeeshan Siddiqui	Davis Arinaitwe (c); Emmanuel Isaneez; Kenneth Kamyuka; Arthur Kyobe; Benjamin Musoke; Frank Nsubuga; Richard Okia; Joel Olwenyi; Martin Ondeko; Raymond Otim; Nandikishore Patel; Danniel Ruyange; Ronald Ssemanda; Laurence Sematimba	Saqib Ali (c); Abdul Rehman; Aman Ali; Amjad Javed; Arshad Ali; Gayan Silva; Irfan Ahmed; Javed Ismail; Khurram Khan; Mohammad Iqbal; Owais Hameed; Qais Farooq; Rohan Mustafa; Shadeep Silva

== Group stage ==
=== Points table ===
Pos	Team	Pld	W	L	T	NR	Pts	NRR
1	Oman	5	5	0	0	0	10	0.767
2	United Arab Emirates	5	4	1	0	0	8	1.660
3	Namibia	5	3	2	0	0	6	1.543
4	Denmark	5	2	3	0	0	4	−1.113
5	Uganda	5	1	4	0	0	2	0.140
6	Argentina	5	0	5	0	0	0	−2.845

=== Fixtures and results ===
24 November 2007
scorecard

Oman; 269/8 (50 overs)	v	Argentina; 251/6 (50 overs)
Hemin Desai 51; Gary Savage 4/57		Alejandro Ferguson 66*; Awal Khan 2/32

Oman won by 18 runs
Centre for Cricket Development Ground, Windhoek
Umpires: K Bayney and JJ Luck
Player of the match: Gary Savage (Argentina)

24 November 2007
scorecard

Denmark; 77 all out (29.1 overs)	v	Namibia; 81/2 (11.5 overs)
David Borchersen 13; Ian van Zyl 4/17		Gerrie Snyman 60*; Thomas Hansen 1/23

Namibia won by 8 wickets
Wanderers Cricket Ground, Windhoek
Umpires: AT Holdstock and KH Hurter
Player of the match: Gerrie Snyman (Namibia)

24 November 2007
scorecard

Uganda; 194 all out (49.4 overs)	v	United Arab Emirates; 195/3 (41.3 overs)
Ronald Semanda 72; Arshad Ali 3/31		Arshad Ali 79*; Kenneth Kamyuka 2/32

United Arab Emirates won by 7 wickets
United Ground, Windhoek
Umpires: NG Bagh and CD Isaacs
Player of the match: Arshad Ali (UAE)

25 November 2007
scorecard

Namibia; 344/6 (50 overs)	v	Argentina; 166/6 (50 overs)
Gerrie Snyman 98; Matias Paterlini 2/61		Matias Paterlini 114*; Bjorn Kotze 2/19

Namibia won by 178 runs
United Ground, Windhoek
Umpires: NG Bagh and AT Holdstock
Player of the match: Matias Paterlini (Argentina)

25 November 2007
scorecard

Denmark; 223 all out (49.2 overs)	v	United Arab Emirates; 224/6 (42.1 overs)
Frederik Klokker 99*; Arshad Ali 7/41		Saqib Ali 66*; David Borchersen 1/29

United Arab Emirates won by 4 wickets
Centre for Cricket Development Ground, Windhoek
Umpires: KH Hurter and CD Isaacs
Player of the match: Arshad Ali (UAE)

25 November 2007
scorecard

Uganda; 251/9 (50 overs)	v	Oman; 255/7 (49 overs)
Arthur Kyobe 50; Tariq Hussain 3/20		Sultan Ahmed 52; Frank Nsubuga 2/38

Oman won by 3 wickets
Wanderers Cricket Ground, Windhoek
Umpires: K Bayney and JJ Luck
Player of the match: Tariq Hussain (Oman)

27 November 2007
scorecard

United Arab Emirates; 412/4 (50 overs)	v	Argentina; 108 all out (43.3 overs)
Arshad Ali 139; Gary Savage 3/68		Martin Siri 32*; Arshad Ali 3/8

United Arab Emirates won by 304 runs
Wanderers Cricket Ground, Windhoek
Umpires: NG Bagh and KH Hurter
Player of the match: Arshad Ali (UAE)

27 November 2007
scorecard

Denmark; 234/5 (50 overs)	v	Uganda; 213/9 (50 overs)
Frederik Klokker 65; Davis Arinaitwe 3/69		Frank Nsubuga 43; Bobby Chawla 4/38

Denmark won by 21 runs
United Ground, Windhoek
Umpires: CD Isaacs and JJ Luck
Player of the match: Lars Hedegaard Andersen (Denmark)

27 November 2007
scorecard

Namibia; 271/6 (50 overs)	v	Oman; 277/8 (46.4 overs)
Gerrie Snyman 158*; Hemin Desai 2/84		Vaibhav Wategaonkar 114*; Bjorn Kotze 3/25

Oman won by 2 wickets
Centre for Cricket Development Ground, Windhoek
Umpires: K Bayney and AT Holdstock
Player of the match: Vaibhav Wategaonkar (Oman)

28 November 2007
scorecard

Argentina; 150/8 (50 overs)	v	Uganda; 151/1 (20.1 overs)
Esteban MacDermott 43*; Frank Nsubuga 3/10		Joel Olweny 62*; Esteban MacDermott 1/29

Uganda won by 9 wickets
Centre for Cricket Development Ground, Windhoek
Umpires: NG Bagh and JJ Luck
Player of the match: Frank Nsubuga (Uganda)

28 November 2007
scorecard

Denmark; 168 all out (43.3 overs)	v	Oman; 169/4 (29.5 overs)
Frederik Klokker 45; Hemal Mehta 3/11		Hemin Desai 47; Bobby Chawla 2/46

Oman won by 6 wickets
United Ground, Windhoek
Umpires: K Bayney and KH Hurter
Player of the match: Hemal Mehta (Oman)

28 November 2007
scorecard

Namibia; 358/7 (50 overs)	v	United Arab Emirates; 359/5 (45.3 overs)
Gerrie Snyman 196; Amjad Javed 3/60		Saqib Ali 91; Louis Klazinga 2/68

United Arab Emirates won by 5 wickets
Wanderers Cricket Ground, Windhoek
Umpires: AT Holdstock and CD Isaacs
Player of the match: Gerrie Snyman (Namibia)

30 November 2007
scorecard

Argentina; 168 all out (48.2 overs)	v	Denmark; 169/7 (46.1 overs)
Matias Paterlini 51; David Borchersen 2/29		Frederik Klokker 54; Esteban Nino 3/35

Denmark won by 3 wickets
Wanderers Cricket Ground, Windhoek
Umpires: KH Hurter and JJ Luck
Player of the match: Frederik Klokker (Denmark)

30 November 2007
scorecard

Namibia; 145 all out (45.4 overs)	v	Uganda; 118 all out (34.5 overs)
Kola Burger 46*; Daniel Ruyange 3/24		Arthur Kyobe 22; Gerrie Snyman 5/36

Namibia won by 27 runs
Centre for Cricket Development Ground, Windhoek
Umpires: NG Bagh and K Bayney
Player of the match: Gerrie Snyman (Namibia)

30 November 2007
scorecard

Oman; 298/8 (50 overs)	v	United Arab Emirates; 273 all out (49.3 overs)
Adnan Ilyas 113; Saqib Ali 2/51		Amjad Javed 71; Hemal Mehta 2/36

Oman won by 25 runs
United Ground, Windhoek
Umpires: AT Holdstock and CD Isaacs
Player of the match: Adnan Ilyas (Oman)

== Final and playoffs ==
1 December 2007
scorecard

United Arab Emirates; 347/8 (50 overs)	v	Oman; 280 all out (43.2 overs)
Arshad Ali 133; Syed Amir Ali 4/63		Zeeshan Ahmed Siddiqui 66; Khurram Khan 3/42

United Arab Emirates won by 67 runs
Wanderers Cricket Ground, Windhoek
Umpires: K Bayney and KH Hurter
Player of the match: Arshad Ali (UAE)
Player of the Tournament: Gerrie Snyman 🇳🇦

- Final

1 December 2007
scorecard

Denmark; 220/8 (50 overs)	v	Namibia; 221/6 (41.2 overs)
Carsten Pedersen 46; Deon Kotze 2/35		Gerrie Snyman 71; Thomas Hansen 2/27

Namibia won by 4 wickets
United Ground, Windhoek
Umpires: AT Holdstock and CD Isaacs
Player of the match: Dawid Botha (Namibia)

- 3rd Place Playoff

1 December 2007
scorecard

Uganda; 335/7 (50 overs)	v	Argentina; 154 all out (35.5 overs)
Joel Olweny 126; Diego Lord 3/45		Donald Forrester 71; Frank Nsubuga 4/39

Uganda won by 181 runs
Centre for Cricket Development Ground, Windhoek
Umpires: NG Bagh and JJ Luck
Player of the match: Joel Olweny (Uganda)

- 5th Place Playoff

== Final placings ==
Pos	Team	Promotion/Relegation
1st	United Arab Emirates	Promoted to 2009 ICC World Cup Qualifier
2nd	Oman	Promoted to 2009 ICC World Cup Qualifier
3rd	Namibia	Promoted to 2009 ICC World Cup Qualifier
4th	Denmark	Promoted to 2009 ICC World Cup Qualifier
5th	Uganda	Relegated to 2009 Global Division Three
6th	Argentina	Relegated to 2009 Global Division Three

== Statistics ==
Most Runs		Most Wickets	
(Namibia) Gerrie Snyman	588	(United Arab Emirates) Arshad Ali	17
(United Arab Emirates) Arshad Ali	497	(Uganda) Frank Nsubuga	12
(Denmark) Frederik Klokker	316	(Argentina) Gary Savage	11
(United Arab Emirates) Mohammad Iqbal	302	(Denmark) Bobby Chawla	10
(United Arab Emirates) Saqib Ali	268	(Namibia) Gerrie Snyman	9
(Oman) Hemin Desai	252	(Uganda) Kenneth Kamyuka	9

== See also ==
- ICC World Cricket League
