= International cricket in 2007–08 =

Cricket season

The 2007–08 international cricket season was from September 2007 and April 2008.

== Season overview ==
International tours
Start date	Home team	Away team	Results [Matches]		
Start date	Home team	Away team	Test	ODI	T20I
29 September 2007	India	Australia	—	2–4 [7]	1–0 [1]
1 October 2007	Pakistan	South Africa	0–1 [2]	2–3 [5]	—
1 October 2007	Sri Lanka	England	1–0 [3]	2–3 [5]	—
6 November 2007	India	Pakistan	1–0 [3]	3–2 [5]	—
8 November 2007	Australia	Sri Lanka	2–0 [2]	—	—
8 November 2007	South Africa	New Zealand	2–0 [2]	2–1 [3]	1–0 [1]
30 November 2007	Zimbabwe	West Indies	—	1–3 [5]	—
11 December 2007	Australia	New Zealand	—	2–0 [3]	1–0 [1]
16 December 2007	South Africa	West Indies	2–1 [3]	5–0 [5]	1–1 [2]
26 December 2007	Australia	India	2–1 [4]	—	1–0 [1]
26 December 2007	New Zealand	Bangladesh	2–0 [2]	3–0 [3]	—
21 January 2008	Pakistan	Zimbabwe	—	5–0 [5]	—
5 February 2008	New Zealand	England	1–2 [3]	3–1 [5]	0–2 [2]
22 February 2008	Bangladesh	South Africa	0–2 [2]	0–3 [3]	—
18 March 2008	Bangladesh	Ireland	—	3–0 [3]	—
22 March 2008	West Indies	Sri Lanka	1–1 [2]	2–0 [3]	—
26 March 2008	India	South Africa	1–1 [3]	—	—
International tournaments
Dates	Tournament			Winners	
11 September 2007	(South Africa) ICC World Twenty20			India	
3 February 2008	(Australia) Commonwealth Bank Series			India	
Minor tours
Start date	Home team	Away team	Results [Matches]		
Start date	Home team	Away team	First-class		List A
18 October 2007	Kenya	Canada	1–0 [1]		2–0 [2]
25 October 2007	Kenya	Bermuda	1–0 [1]		3–0 [3]
Minor tournaments
Dates	Tournament			Winners	
1 September 2007	Twenty20 Quadrangular Series in Kenya			Pakistan	
24 November 2007	(Namibia) ICC World Cricket League Division Two			UAE	

== Pre-season rankings ==
ICC Test Championship 1 August 2007
Rank	Team	Matches	Points	Rating
1	Australia	25	3534	141
2	England	32	3671	115
3	Sri Lanka	25	2673	107
4	South Africa	27	2759	102
5	India	25	2547	102
6	Pakistan	26	2573	99
7	New Zealand	15	1481	99
8	West Indies	24	1717	72
9	Bangladesh	18	65	4

ICC ODI Championship 1 August 2007
Rank	Team	Matches	Points	Rating
1	Australia	27	3496	129
2	South Africa	24	2939	124
3	New Zealand	25	2843	114
4	Sri Lanka	32	3536	111
5	India	30	3314	110
6	Pakistan	18	1943	108
7	West Indies	28	2853	102
8	England	23	2326	101
9	Bangladesh	26	1238	48
10	Ireland	8	227	28
11	Zimbabwe	22	370	18
12	Kenya	6	0	0

== September ==
=== Kenya Twenty20 Quadrangular ===
No.	Date	Team 1	Captain	Team 2	Captain	Venue	Result
Match 1	1 September	Pakistan	Shoaib Malik	Uganda	Joel Olwenyi	Gymkhana Club Ground, Nairobi	Pakistan by 148 runs
T20I 17	1 September	Kenya	Steve Tikolo	Bangladesh	Mohammad Ashraful	Gymkhana Club Ground, Nairobi	Bangladesh by 5 wickets
Match 3	2 September	Kenya	Steve Tikolo	Uganda	Joel Olwenyi	Gymkhana Club Ground, Nairobi	Uganda by 2 wickets
T20I 18	2 September	Bangladesh	Mohammad Ashraful	Pakistan	Shoaib Malik	Gymkhana Club Ground, Nairobi	Pakistan by 30 runs
Match 5	3 September	Bangladesh	Mohammad Ashraful	Uganda	Joel Olwenyi	Gymkhana Club Ground, Nairobi	Bangladesh by 21 runs
T20I 19	3 September	Kenya	Thomas Odoyo	Pakistan	Shoaib Malik	Gymkhana Club Ground, Nairobi	Pakistan by 8 wickets

=== ICC World Twenty20 ===
==== Group stage ====
Group A
Pos	Seed	Team	Pld	W	L	NR	Pts	NRR
1	A1	South Africa	2	2	0	0	4	0.974
2	A3	Bangladesh	2	1	1	0	2	0.149
3	A2	West Indies	2	0	2	0	0	−1.233

Source: ESPNCricinfo

Group B
Pos	Seed	Team	Pld	W	L	NR	Pts	NRR
1	B1	Australia	2	1	1	0	2	0.987
2	B2	England	2	1	1	0	2	0.209
3	B3	Zimbabwe	2	1	1	0	2	−1.196

Source: ESPNCricinfo

Group C
Pos	Seed	Team	Pld	W	L	NR	Pts	NRR
1	C2	Sri Lanka	2	2	0	0	4	4.721
2	C1	New Zealand	2	1	1	0	2	2.396
3	C3	Kenya	2	0	2	0	0	−8.047

Updated to match(es) played on comple. Source: ESPNCricinfote

Group D
Pos	Seed	Team	Pld	W	L	NR	Pts	NRR
1	D2	India	2	1	0	1	3	0.000
2	D1	Pakistan	2	1	1	0	2	1.275
3	D3	Scotland	2	0	1	1	1	−2.550

Source: ESPNCricinfo

No.	Date	Team 1	Captain	Team 2	Captain	Venue	Result
Group stage
T20I 20	11 September	South Africa	Graeme Smith	West Indies	Ramnaresh Sarwan	New Wanderers Stadium, Johannesburg	South Africa by 8 wickets
T20I 21	12 September	Kenya	Steve Tikolo	New Zealand	Daniel Vettori	Kingsmead, Durban	New Zealand by 9 wickets
T20I 22	12 September	Pakistan	Shoaib Malik	Scotland	Ryan Watson	Kingsmead, Durban	Pakistan by 51 runs
T20I 23	12 September	Australia	Ricky Ponting	Zimbabwe	Prosper Utseya	Newlands, Cape Town	Zimbabwe by 5 wickets
T20I 24	13 September	Bangladesh	Mohammad Ashraful	West Indies	Ramnaresh Sarwan	New Wanderers Stadium, Johannesburg	Bangladesh by 6 wickets
T20I 25	13 September	England	Paul Collingwood	Zimbabwe	Prosper Utseya	Newlands, Cape Town	England by 50 runs
T20I 26	13 September	India	Mahendra Singh Dhoni	Scotland	Ryan Watson	Kingsmead, Durban	Match abandoned
T20I 27	14 September	Kenya	Steve Tikolo	Sri Lanka	Mahela Jayawardene	New Wanderers Stadium, Johannesburg	Sri Lanka by 172 runs
T20I 28	14 September	Australia	Ricky Ponting	England	Paul Collingwood	Newlands, Cape Town	Australia by 8 wickets
T20I 29	14 September	India	Mahendra Singh Dhoni	Pakistan	Shoaib Malik	Kingsmead, Durban	Match tied (India won the bowl-out)
T20I 30	15 September	New Zealand	Daniel Vettori	Sri Lanka	Mahela Jayawardene	New Wanderers Stadium, Johannesburg	Sri Lanka by 7 wickets
T20I 31	15 September	South Africa	Graeme Smith	Bangladesh	Mohammad Ashraful	Newlands, Cape Town	South Africa by 7 wickets

==== Super Eights ====
Group E
Pos	Team	Pld	W	L	NR	Pts	NRR
1	India	3	2	1	0	4	0.750
2	New Zealand	3	2	1	0	4	0.050
3	South Africa	3	2	1	0	4	−0.116
4	England	3	0	3	0	0	−0.700

Source: ESPNCricinfo

Group F
Pos	Team	Pld	W	L	NR	Pts	NRR
1	Pakistan	3	3	0	0	6	0.843
2	Australia	3	2	1	0	4	2.256
3	Sri Lanka	3	1	2	0	2	−0.697
4	Bangladesh	3	0	3	0	0	−2.031

Source: ESPNCricinfo

No.	Date	Team 1	Captain	Team 2	Captain	Venue	Result
Super Eights
T20I 32	16 September	New Zealand	Daniel Vettori	India	Mahendra Singh Dhoni	New Wanderers Stadium, Johannesburg	New Zealand by 10 runs
T20I 33	16 September	Australia	Ricky Ponting	Bangladesh	Mohammad Ashraful	Newlands, Cape Town	Australia by 9 wickets
T20I 34	16 September	South Africa	Graeme Smith	England	Paul Collingwood	Newlands, Cape Town	South Africa by 19 runs
T20I 35	17 September	Pakistan	Shoaib Malik	Sri Lanka	Mahela Jayawardene	New Wanderers Stadium, Johannesburg	Pakistan by 33 runs
T20I 36	18 September	New Zealand	Daniel Vettori	England	Paul Collingwood	Kingsmead, Durban	New Zealand by 5 runs
T20I 37	18 September	Australia	Ricky Ponting	Pakistan	Shoaib Malik	New Wanderers Stadium, Johannesburg	Pakistan by 6 wickets
T20I 38	18 September	Bangladesh	Mohammad Ashraful	Sri Lanka	Mahela Jayawardene	New Wanderers Stadium, Johannesburg	Sri Lanka by 64 runs
T20I 39	19 September	South Africa	Graeme Smith	New Zealand	Daniel Vettori	Kingsmead, Durban	South Africa by 6 wickets
T20I 40	19 September	England	Paul Collingwood	India	Mahendra Singh Dhoni	Kingsmead, Durban	India by 18 runs
T20I 41	20 September	Australia	Ricky Ponting	Sri Lanka	Mahela Jayawardene	Newlands, Cape Town	Australia by 10 wickets
T20I 42	20 September	Pakistan	Shoaib Malik	Bangladesh	Mohammad Ashraful	Newlands, Cape Town	Pakistan by 4 wickets
T20I 43	20 September	South Africa	Graeme Smith	India	Mahendra Singh Dhoni	Kingsmead, Durban	India by 37 runs

==== Knockout stage ====
No.	Date	Team 1	Captain	Team 2	Captain	Venue	Result
Semi-finals
T20I 44	22 September	New Zealand	Daniel Vettori	Pakistan	Shoaib Malik	Newlands, Cape Town	Pakistan by 6 wickets
T20I 45	22 September	India	Mahendra Singh Dhoni	Australia	Adam Gilchrist	Kingsmead, Durban	India by 15 runs
Final
T20I 46	24 September	Pakistan	Shoaib Malik	India	Mahendra Singh Dhoni	New Wanderers Stadium, Johannesburg	India by 5 runs

=== Australia in India ===
No.	Date	Home captain	Away captain	Venue	Result
ODI series
ODI 2621	29 September	Mahendra Singh Dhoni	Adam Gilchrist	M.Chinnaswamy Stadium, Bangalore	Match abandoned
ODI 2623	2 October	Mahendra Singh Dhoni	Adam Gilchrist	Nehru Stadium, Kochi	Australia by 84 runs
ODI 2625	5 October	Mahendra Singh Dhoni	Ricky Ponting	Rajiv Gandhi International Stadium, Hyderabad	Australia by 47 runs
ODI 2627	8 October	Mahendra Singh Dhoni	Ricky Ponting	Sector 16 Stadium, Chandigarh	India by 8 runs
ODI 2629	11 October	Mahendra Singh Dhoni	Ricky Ponting	Reliance Stadium, Baroda	Australia by 9 wickets
ODI 2631	14 October	Mahendra Singh Dhoni	Ricky Ponting	Vidarbha Cricket Association Ground, Nagpur	Australia by 18 runs
ODI 2632	17 October	Mahendra Singh Dhoni	Ricky Ponting	Wankhede Stadium, Mumbai	India by 2 wickets
T20I
T20I 47	20 October	Mahendra Singh Dhoni	Ricky Ponting	Brabourne Stadium, Mumbai	India by 7 wickets

== October ==
=== South Africa in Pakistan ===
No.	Date	Home captain	Away captain	Venue	Result
Test series
Test 1843	1–5 October	Shoaib Malik	Graeme Smith	National Stadium, Karachi	South Africa by 160 runs
Test 1844	8–12 October	Shoaib Malik	Graeme Smith	Gaddafi Stadium, Lahore	Match drawn
ODI series
ODI 2633	18 October	Shoaib Malik	Graeme Smith	Gaddafi Stadium, Lahore	South Africa by 45 runs
ODI 2635	20 October	Shoaib Malik	Graeme Smith	Gaddafi Stadium, Lahore	Pakistan by 20 runs
ODI 2637	23 October	Shoaib Malik	Graeme Smith	Iqbal Stadium, Faisalabad	Pakistan by 6 wickets
ODI 2639	26 October	Shoaib Malik	Graeme Smith	Multan Cricket Stadium, Multan	South Africa by 7 wickets
ODI 2642	29 October	Shoaib Malik	Graeme Smith	Gaddafi Stadium, Lahore	South Africa by 14 runs

=== England in Sri Lanka ===
No.	Date	Home captain	Away captain	Venue	Result
ODI series
ODI 2622	1 October	Mahela Jayawardene	Paul Collingwood	Rangiri Dambulla International Stadium, Dambulla	Sri Lanka by 119 runs
ODI 2624	4 October	Mahela Jayawardene	Paul Collingwood	Rangiri Dambulla International Stadium, Dambulla	England by 65 runs
ODI 2626	7 October	Mahela Jayawardene	Paul Collingwood	Rangiri Dambulla International Stadium, Dambulla	England by 2 wickets (D/L)
ODI 2628	10 October	Mahela Jayawardene	Paul Collingwood	R. Premadasa Stadium, Colombo	England by 5 wickets
ODI 2630	13 October	Mahela Jayawardene	Paul Collingwood	R. Premadasa Stadium, Colombo	Sri Lanka by 107 runs
Test series
Test 1851	1–5 December	Mahela Jayawardene	Michael Vaughan	Asgiriya Stadium, Kandy	Sri Lanka by 88 runs
Test 1853	9–13 December	Mahela Jayawardene	Michael Vaughan	Sinhalese Sports Club Ground, Colombo	Match drawn
Test 1854	18–22 December	Mahela Jayawardene	Michael Vaughan	Galle International Stadium, Galle	Match drawn

=== Canada in Kenya ===
No.	Date	Home captain	Away captain	Venue	Result
ODI series
ODI 2634	18 October	Steve Tikolo	Sunil Dhaniram	Gymkhana Club Ground, Nairobi	Kenya by 4 wickets
ODI 2636	20 October	Steve Tikolo	Sunil Dhaniram	Gymkhana Club Ground, Nairobi	Kenya by 4 wickets

=== Bermuda in Kenya ===
No.	Date	Home captain	Away captain	Venue	Result
ODI series
ODI 2638	25 October	Steve Tikolo	Irving Romaine	Gymkhana Club Ground, Nairobi	Kenya by 8 wickets
ODI 2640	28 October	Steve Tikolo	Irving Romaine	Gymkhana Club Ground, Nairobi	Kenya by 3 wickets
ODI 2641	29 October	Steve Tikolo	Irving Romaine	Gymkhana Club Ground, Nairobi	Kenya by 1 wicket

== November ==
=== Pakistan in India ===
No.	Date	Home captain	Away captain	Venue	Result
ODI series
ODI 2643	6 November	Mahendra Singh Dhoni	Shoaib Malik	Nehru Stadium, Guwahati	India by 5 wickets
ODI 2644	8 November	Mahendra Singh Dhoni	Shoaib Malik	Punjab Cricket Association Stadium, Mohali	Pakistan by 4 wickets
ODI 2645	11 November	Mahendra Singh Dhoni	Shoaib Malik	Green Park Stadium, Kanpur	India by 46 runs
ODI 2646	15 November	Mahendra Singh Dhoni	Shoaib Malik	Captain Roop Singh Stadium, Gwalior	India by 6 wickets
ODI 2647	18 November	Mahendra Singh Dhoni	Shoaib Malik	Sawai Mansingh Stadium, Jaipur	Pakistan by 31 runs
Test series
Test 1849	22–26 November	Anil Kumble	Shoaib Malik	Feroz Shah Kotla Ground, Delhi	India by 6 wickets
Test 1850	30 November – 4 December	Anil Kumble	Younis Khan	Eden Gardens, Kolkata	Match drawn
Test 1852	8–12 December	Anil Kumble	Younis Khan	M. Chinnaswamy Stadium, Bangalore	Match drawn

=== Sri Lanka in Australia ===
No.	Date	Home captain	Away captain	Venue	Result
Test series
Test 1845	8–12 November	Ricky Ponting	Mahela Jayawardene	The Gabba, Brisbane	Australia by an innings and 40 runs
Test 1847	16–20 November	Ricky Ponting	Mahela Jayawardene	Bellerive Oval. Hobart	Australia by 96 runs

=== New Zealand in South Africa ===
No.	Date	Home captain	Away captain	Venue	Result
Test series
Test 1846	8–12 November	Graeme Smith	Daniel Vettori	New Wanderers Stadium, Johannesburg	South Africa by 358 runs
Test 1848	16–20 November	Graeme Smith	Daniel Vettori	SuperSport Park, Centurion	South Africa by an innings and 59 runs
T20I series
T20I 48	23 November	Graeme Smith	Daniel Vettori	New Wanderers Stadium, Johannesburg	South Africa by 3 wickets
ODI series
ODI 2648	25 November	Graeme Smith	Daniel Vettori	Kingsmead, Durban	South Africa by 2 wickets
ODI 2650	30 November	Graeme Smith	Daniel Vettori	St George's Park, Port Elizabeth	New Zealand by 7 wickets
ODI 2652	2 December	Graeme Smith	Daniel Vettori	Newlands, Cape Town	South Africa by 5 wickets

=== West Indies in Zimbabwe ===
No.	Date	Home captain	Away captain	Venue	Result
ODI series
ODI 2649	30 November	Prosper Utseya	Chris Gayle	Harare Sports Club, Harare	Zimbabwe by 30 runs
ODI 2651	2 December	Prosper Utseya	Chris Gayle	Harare Sports Club, Harare	West Indies by 110 runs
ODI 2653	5 December	Prosper Utseya	Dwayne Bravo	Queens Sports Club, Bulawayo	West Indies by 6 wickets
ODI 2654	7 December	Prosper Utseya	Dwayne Bravo	Queens Sports Club, Bulawayo	West Indies by 5 wickets
ODI 2654a	9 December	Prosper Utseya	Dwayne Bravo	Queens Sports Club, Bulawayo	Match abandoned

=== World Cricket League Division 2 ===
==== Group stage ====
Pos	Team	Pld	W	L	T	NR	Pts	NRR
1	Oman	5	5	0	0	0	10	0.767
2	United Arab Emirates	5	4	1	0	0	8	1.660
3	Namibia	5	3	2	0	0	6	1.543
4	Denmark	5	2	3	0	0	4	−1.113
5	Uganda	5	1	4	0	0	2	0.140
6	Argentina	5	0	5	0	0	0	−2.845

No.	Date	Team 1	Captain	Team 2	Captain	Venue	Result
Group stage
Match 1	24 November	Argentina	Esteban MacDermott	Oman	Hemal Mehta	Centre for Cricket Development Ground, Windhoek, Namibia	Oman by 18 runs
Match 2	24 November	Namibia	Bjorn Kotze	Denmark	Frederik Klokker	Wanderers Cricket Ground, Windhoek, Namibia	Namibia by 8 wickets
Match 3	24 November	Uganda	Davis Arinaitwe	United Arab Emirates	Saqib Ali	United Ground, Windhoek, Namibia	United Arab Emirates by 7 wickets
Match 4	25 November	Argentina	Esteban MacDermott	Namibia	Bjorn Kotze	United Ground, Windhoek, Namibia	Namibia by 178 runs
Match 5	25 November	Denmark	Frederik Klokker	United Arab Emirates	Saqib Ali	Centre for Cricket Development Ground, Windhoek, Namibia	United Arab Emirates by 4 wickets
Match 6	25 November	Oman	Hemal Mehta	Uganda	Davis Arinaitwe	Wanderers Cricket Ground, Windhoek, Namibia	Oman by 3 wickets
Match 7	27 November	Argentina	Esteban MacDermott	United Arab Emirates	Saqib Ali	Wanderers Cricket Ground, Windhoek, Namibia	United Arab Emirates by 304 runs
Match 8	27 November	Denmark	Frederik Klokker	Uganda	Davis Arinaitwe	United Ground, Windhoek, Namibia	Denmark by 21 runs
Match 9	27 November	Namibia	Bjorn Kotze	Oman	Ameet Sampat	Centre for Cricket Development Ground, Windhoek, Namibia	Oman by 2 wickets
Match 10	28 November	Argentina	Esteban MacDermott	Uganda	Davis Arinaitwe	Centre for Cricket Development Ground, Windhoek, Namibia	Uganda by 9 wickets
Match 11	28 November	Denmark	Frederik Klokker	Oman	Ameet Sampat	United Ground, Windhoek, Namibia	Oman by 6 wickets
Match 12	28 November	Namibia	Bjorn Kotze	United Arab Emirates	Saqib Ali	Wanderers Cricket Ground, Windhoek, Namibia	United Arab Emirates by 5 wickets
Match 13	30 November	Argentina	Esteban MacDermott	Denmark	Frederik Klokker	Wanderers Cricket Ground, Windhoek, Namibia	Denmark by 3 wickets
Match 14	30 November	Namibia	Bjorn Kotze	Uganda	Davis Arinaitwe	Centre for Cricket Development Ground, Windhoek, Namibia	Namibia by 27 runs
Match 15	30 November	Oman	Ameet Sampat	United Arab Emirates	Saqib Ali	United Ground, Windhoek, Namibia	Oman by 25 runs

==== Finals and playoffs ====
No.	Date	Team 1	Captain	Team 2	Captain	Venue	Result
Final	1 December	Oman	Ameet Sampat	United Arab Emirates	Saqib Ali	Wanderers Cricket Ground, Windhoek, Namibia	United Arab Emirates by 67 runs
3rd Place Playoff	1 December	Namibia	Bjorn Kotze	Denmark	Frederik Klokker	United Ground, Windhoek, Windhoek, Namibia	Namibia by 4 wickets
5th Place Playoff	1 December	Uganda	Davis Arinaitwe	Argentina	Esteban MacDermott	Centre for Cricket Development Ground, Windhoek, Namibia	Uganda by 181 runs

== December ==
=== New Zealand in Australia ===
No.	Date	Home captain	Away captain	Venue	Result
T20I
T20I 49	11 December	Michael Clarke	Daniel Vettori	WACA Ground, Perth	Australia by 54 runs
ODI series
ODI 2655	14 December	Ricky Ponting	Daniel Vettori	Adelaide Oval, Adelaide	Australia by 7 wickets
ODI 2656	16 December	Ricky Ponting	Daniel Vettori	Sydney Cricket Ground, Sydney	Match abandoned
ODI 2657	20 December	Ricky Ponting	Daniel Vettori	Bellerive Oval, Hobart	Australia by 114 runs

=== West Indies in South Africa ===
No.	Date	Home captain	Away captain	Venue	Result
T20I series
T20I 50	16 December	Shaun Pollock	Dwayne Bravo	St George's Park, Port Elizabeth	West Indies by 5 wickets
T20I 51	18 January	Graeme Smith	Dwayne Bravo	New Wanderers Stadium, Johannesburg	South Africa by 4 wickets
Test series
Test 1856	26–30 December	Graeme Smith	Chris Gayle	St George's Park, Port Elizabeth	West Indies by 128 runs
Test 1858	2–6 January	Graeme Smith	Chris Gayle	Newlands, Cape Town	South Africa by 7 wickets
Test 1860	10–14 January	Graeme Smith	Dwayne Bravo	Kingsmead, Durban	South Africa by an innings and 100 runs
ODI series
ODI 2661	20 January	Graeme Smith	Dwayne Bravo	SuperSport Park, Centurion	South Africa by 6 wickets
ODI 2664	25 January	Graeme Smith	Dwayne Bravo	Newlands, Cape Town	South Africa by 86 runs
ODI 2666	27 January	Graeme Smith	Dwayne Bravo	St George's Park, Port Elizabeth	South Africa by 7 wickets
ODI 2668	1 February	Graeme Smith	Dwayne Bravo	Kingsmead, Durban	South Africa by 5 wickets
ODI 2671	3 February	Graeme Smith	Dwayne Bravo	New Wanderers Stadium, Johannesburg	South Africa by 8 wickets

=== India in Australia ===
No.	Date	Home captain	Away captain	Venue	Result
Test series
Test 1855	26–30 December	Ricky Ponting	Anil Kumble	Melbourne Cricket Ground, Melbourne	Australia by 337 runs
Test 1857	2–6 January	Ricky Ponting	Anil Kumble	Sydney Cricket Ground, Sydney	Australia by 122 runs
Test 1862	16–20 January	Ricky Ponting	Anil Kumble	WACA Ground, Perth	India by 72 runs
Test 1863	24–28 January	Ricky Ponting	Anil Kumble	Adelaide Oval, Adelaide	Match drawn
T20I
T20I 52	1 February	Michael Clarke	Mahendra Singh Dhoni	Melbourne Cricket Ground, Melbourne	Australia by 9 wickets

=== Bangladesh in New Zealand ===
No.	Date	Home captain	Away captain	Venue	Result
ODI series
ODI 2658	26 December	Daniel Vettori	Mohammad Ashraful	Eden Park, Auckland	New Zealand by 6 wickets
ODI 2659	28 December	Daniel Vettori	Mohammad Ashraful	McLean Park, Napier	New Zealand by 102 runs
ODI 2660	31 December	Daniel Vettori	Mohammad Ashraful	Queenstown Events Centre, Queenstown	New Zealand by 10 wickets
Test series
Test 1859	4–8 January	Daniel Vettori	Mohammad Ashraful	University Oval, Dunedin	New Zealand by 9 wickets
Test 1861	12–16 January	Daniel Vettori	Mohammad Ashraful	Basin Reserve, Wellington	New Zealand by an innings and 137 runs

== January ==
=== Zimbabwe in Pakistan ===
No.	Date	Home captain	Away captain	Venue	Result
ODI series
ODI 2662	21 January	Shoaib Malik	Prosper Utseya	National Stadium, Karachi	Pakistan by 104 runs
ODI 2663	24 January	Shoaib Malik	Prosper Utseya	Niaz Stadium, Hyderabad	Pakistan by 5 wickets
ODI 2665	27 January	Shoaib Malik	Hamilton Masakadza	Multan Cricket Stadium, Multan	Pakistan by 37 runs
ODI 2667	30 January	Shoaib Malik	Hamilton Masakadza	Iqbal Stadium, Faisalabad	Pakistan by 7 wickets
ODI 2669	2 February	Shoaib Malik	Hamilton Masakadza	Sheikhupura Stadium, Sheikhupura	Pakistan by 7 wickets

== February ==
=== Commonwealth Bank Series ===
Group stage
Pos	Team	Pld	W	L	T	NR	BP	Pts	NRR	For	Against
1	Australia	8	5	2	0	1	4	26	0.769	1477/329.3	1208/325.2
2	India	8	3	3	0	2	1	17	0.121	1184/248.2	1250/269
3	Sri Lanka	8	2	5	0	1	0	10	−0.949	1167/298.3	1370/282

Source: Cricinfo

Group stage
No.	Date	Team 1	Captain	Team 2	Captain	Venue	Result
ODI 2670	3 February	Australia	Ricky Ponting	India	Mahendra Singh Dhoni	The Gabba, Brisbane	Match abandoned
ODI 2672	5 February	India	Mahendra Singh Dhoni	Sri Lanka	Mahela Jayawardene	The Gabba, Brisbane	Match abandoned
ODI 2673	8 February	Australia	Ricky Ponting	Sri Lanka	Mahela Jayawardene	Sydney Cricket Ground, Sydney	Australia by 128 runs
ODI 2675	10 February	Australia	Ricky Ponting	India	Mahendra Singh Dhoni	Melbourne Cricket Ground, Melbourne	India by 5 wickets
ODI 2676	12 February	India	Mahendra Singh Dhoni	Sri Lanka	Mahela Jayawardene	Manuka Oval, Canberra	Sri Lanka by 8 wickets (D/L)
ODI 2679	15 February	Australia	Ricky Ponting	Sri Lanka	Mahela Jayawardene	WACA Ground, Perth	Australia by 63 runs
ODI 2680	17 February	Australia	Ricky Ponting	India	Mahendra Singh Dhoni	Adelaide Oval, Adelaide	Australia by 50 runs
ODI 2681	19 February	India	Mahendra Singh Dhoni	Sri Lanka	Mahela Jayawardene	Adelaide Oval, Adelaide	India by 2 wickets
ODI 2683	22 February	Australia	Ricky Ponting	Sri Lanka	Mahela Jayawardene	Melbourne Cricket Ground, Melbourne	Australia by 24 runs (D/L)
ODI 2685	24 February	Australia	Ricky Ponting	India	Mahendra Singh Dhoni	Sydney Cricket Ground, Sydney	Australia by 18 runs
ODI 2686	26 February	India	Mahendra Singh Dhoni	Sri Lanka	Mahela Jayawardene	Bellerive Oval. Hobart	India by 7 wickets
ODI 2687	29 February	Australia	Ricky Ponting	Sri Lanka	Mahela Jayawardene	Melbourne Cricket Ground, Melbourne	Sri Lanka by 13 runs
Finals

=== England in New Zealand ===
No.	Date	Home captain	Away captain	Venue	Result
T20I series
T20I 53	5 February	Brendon McCullum	Paul Collingwood	Eden Park, Auckland	England by 32 runs
T20I 54	7 February	Brendon McCullum	Paul Collingwood	Jade Stadium, Christchurch	England by 50 runs
ODI series
ODI 2674	9 February	Daniel Vettori	Paul Collingwood	Basin Reserve, Wellington	New Zealand by 6 wickets
ODI 2677	12 February	Daniel Vettori	Paul Collingwood	Seddon Park, Hamilton	New Zealand by 10 wickets
ODI 2678	15 February	Daniel Vettori	Paul Collingwood	Eden Park, Auckland	England by 6 wickets
ODI 2682	20 February	Daniel Vettori	Paul Collingwood	McLean Park, Napier	Match tied
ODI 2684	23 February	Daniel Vettori	Paul Collingwood	AMI Stadium, Christchurch	New Zealand by 34 runs (D/L)
Test series
Test 1866	5–9 March	Daniel Vettori	Michael Vaughan	Seddon Park, Hamilton	New Zealand by 189 runs
Test 1867	13–17 March	Daniel Vettori	Michael Vaughan	Basin Reserve, Wellington	England by 126 runs
Test 1868	22–26 March	Daniel Vettori	Michael Vaughan	McLean Park, Napier	England by 121 runs

=== South Africa in Bangladesh ===
No.	Date	Home captain	Away captain	Venue	Result
Test series
Test 1864	22–26 February	Mohammad Ashraful	Graeme Smith	Shere Bangla National Stadium, Mirpur	South Africa by 5 wickets
Test 1865	29 February – 4 March	Mohammad Ashraful	Graeme Smith	Zohur Ahmed Chowdhury Stadium, Chittagong	South Africa by an innings and 205 runs
ODI series
ODI 2690	9 March	Mohammad Ashraful	Graeme Smith	Zohur Ahmed Chowdhury Stadium, Chittagong	South Africa by 9 wickets
ODI 2691	12 March	Mohammad Ashraful	Graeme Smith	Shere Bangla National Stadium, Mirpur	South Africa by 7 wickets
ODI 2692	14 March	Mohammad Ashraful	Graeme Smith	Shere Bangla National Stadium, Mirpur	South Africa by 7 wickets

== March ==
=== Ireland in Bangladesh ===
No.	Date	Home captain	Away captain	Venue	Result
ODI series
ODI 2693	18 March	Mohammad Ashraful	Trent Johnston	Shere Bangla National Stadium, Mirpur	Bangladesh by 8 wickets
ODI 2694	20 March	Mohammad Ashraful	Trent Johnston	Shere Bangla National Stadium, Mirpur	Bangladesh by 84 runs
ODI 2695	22 March	Mohammad Ashraful	Trent Johnston	Shere Bangla National Stadium, Mirpur	Bangladesh by 79 runs

=== Sri Lanka in West Indies ===
No.	Date	Home captain	Away captain	Venue	Result
Test series
Test 1869	22–26 March	Chris Gayle	Mahela Jayawardene	Providence Stadium, Georgetown, Guyana	Sri Lanka by 121 runs
Test 1872	3–7 April	Chris Gayle	Mahela Jayawardene	Queen's Park Oval, Port of Spain, Trinidad	West Indies by 6 wickets
ODI series
ODI 2697	10 April	Chris Gayle	Mahela Jayawardene	Queen's Park Oval, Port of Spain, Trinidad	West Indies by 1 wicket
ODI 2699	12 April	Chris Gayle	Mahela Jayawardene	Queen's Park Oval, Port of Spain, Trinidad	West Indies by 7 wickets (D/L)
ODI 2701	15 April	Chris Gayle	Mahela Jayawardene	Beausejour Stadium, Gros Islet, St Lucia	Match abandoned

=== South Africa in India ===
No.	Date	Home captain	Away captain	Venue	Result
Test series
Test 1870	26–30 March	Anil Kumble	Graeme Smith	M.A. Chidambaram Stadium, Chennai	Match drawn
Test 1871	3–7 April	Anil Kumble	Graeme Smith	Sardar Patel Stadium, Ahmedabad	South Africa by an innings and 90 runs
Test 1873	11–15 April	Mahendra Singh Dhoni	Graeme Smith	Green Park Stadium, Kanpur	India by 8 wickets

=== Australia in Pakistan ===
The Australia national cricket team was scheduled to tour Pakistan in March and April 2008, to play three Test matches and five One Day Internationals. The tour was cancelled by Australia due to concerns about the security of playing in the country. Following the 2008 general elections in Pakistan, there was continual violence, and some of the Australian players spoke about against travelling to compete in the series.

== See also ==
- Australian cricket team in 2007–08
- International cricket in 2008
