= Martin Ondeko =

Former Ugandan cricketer

CEO Of Uganda Cricket Association
- Preceded by: Justine Ligyalingi

Martin Ondeko
Personal information
- Born: 16 July 1985 (age 41); Entebbe, Uganda
- Batting: Right-handed
- Bowling: Right-arm off-spin
- Role: Opening batsman

International information
- National side: Uganda (2007–2008)
- Source: CricketArchive, 5 April 2016 2016

Martin Ondeko (born 16 July 1985) is a Ugandan former international cricketer who represented the Ugandan national side in 2007 and 2008. He played as a right-handed opening batsman.

Ondeko was born in the town of Entebbe, in Uganda's Central Region. He represented the Uganda under-19s at the 2004 Under-19 World Cup in Bangladesh, featuring in four of his team's six matches. In Uganda's final game of the tournament, a five-wicket win against Canada, he scored 99 not out from 148 balls, for which he was named the man of the match. Ondeko's senior debut for Uganda came in September 2007, when he played against Bangladesh in the 2007 Kenya Twenty20 Quadrangular. Later in the year, he made a single appearance in the 2007 World Cricket League Division Two tournament in Namibia, which held List A status. He was called into the team for the fifth-place play-off against Argentina – a dead rubber – and scored nine runs before being trapped leg before wicket by Diego Lord. Ondeko's final match for Uganda came in February 2008, against a touring Marylebone Cricket Club team.

Ondeko is the Chief Executing Officer (CEO) of Uganda Cricket Association.
