= Anders Rasmussen (cricketer) =

Danish cricketer (born 1975)

Personal information
- Full name: Anders Rasmussen
- Born: 25 February 1975 (age 51); Glostrup, Denmark
- Batting: Right-handed
- Bowling: Right-arm off-break

Career statistics
Competition	LA
Matches	1
Runs scored	0
Batting average	–
100s/50s	0/0
Top score	–
Balls bowled	30
Wickets	1
Bowling average	25.00
5 wickets in innings	0
10 wickets in match	0
Best bowling	1/25
Catches/stumpings	0/0
- Source: CricketArchive, 22 April 2009

Anders Rasmussen (born 25 February 1975) is a Danish cricketer. He made his List A debut against Argentina in the 2007 ICC World Cricket League Division Two, where he took the single wicket of Pedro Bruno but did not bat.

Earlier in his career, Rasmussen played two games in the 1997 ICC Trophy.
