= Mohammad Iqbal (Emirati cricketer) =

Emirati cricketer (born 1977)

Personal information
- Born: 29 March 1977 (age 49); Dubai, United Arab Emirates
- Batting: Right-handed
- Bowling: Right-arm medium-fast
- Role: Opening batsman

International information
- National side: United Arab Emirates (2006–2011)
- Source: CricketArchive, 6 April 2016

Mohammad Iqbal (born 29 March 1977) is a former Emirati international cricketer who represented the United Arab Emirates national team between 2006 and 2011. He played as a right-handed opening batsman.

Born in Dubai, Iqbal made his international debut for the UAE at the 2006 ACC Trophy in Malaysia. He featured in all six of his team's matches, and scored 228 runs, behind only Arshad Ali and Saqib Ali for his team. This included a score of 114 in the opening match against Brunei, made from only 59 balls. In January 2007, Iqbal was selected for an Intercontinental Cup game against Scotland, making his first-class debut. Later in the year, he also played in the 2007 World Cricket League Division Two tournament in Namibia, where matches held List A status. His tournament included scores of 78 from 64 balls against Argentina and 111 from 82 balls against Oman, and he finished fourth for overall runs scored.

In January 2008, Iqbal made a second and final first-class appearance for the UAE, in an Intercontinental Cup game against Namibia. At the 2008 ACC Trophy, he again played in all of his team's matches, but could not repeat his form from the previous event, scoring only 110 runs from six innings. The following year, at the 2009 ACC Twenty20 Cup, Iqbal was twice the UAE's top-scorer, making 42 from 26 balls against Hong Kong and 71 not out from 37 balls against Saudi Arabia. Among his teammates, only Amjad Javed scored more runs. By making the final of the ACC Twenty20 Cup, the UAE qualified for the 2010 World Twenty20 Qualifier, the final qualification tournament for the 2010 World Twenty20 in the West Indies. At the World Twenty20 Qualifier, Iqbal played in all five of his team's matches, but had little impact, scoring only 53 runs (with a highest of 20 against Kenya). He made his final appearance for the UAE in September 2011, against Afghanistan in the Caribasian Tournament.
