= Morten Hedegaard =

Danish cricketer (born 1972)

Personal information
- Full name: Morten Hedegaard Andersen
- Born: 19 February 1972 (age 54); Nykøbing Mors, Viborg County, Denmark
- Batting: Right-handed
- Bowling: Right-arm fast-medium
- Relatives: Lars Hedegaard Andersen (brother)

International information
- National side: Denmark

Domestic team information
- Years: Team
- 1999: Denmark

Career statistics
Competition	List A
Matches	17
Runs scored	129
Batting average	9.21
100s/50s	–/–
Top score	24*
Balls bowled	540
Wickets	11
Bowling average	40.63
5 wickets in innings	–
10 wickets in match	–
Best bowling	3/42
Catches/stumpings	2/–
- Source: Cricinfo, 8 November 2009

Morten Hedegaard Andersen (born 19 February 1972) is a Danish former cricketer. Hedegaard was a right-handed batsman who bowled right-arm fast-medium. He was born at Nykøbing Mors, Viborg County. He is more commonly known as Morten Hedegaard.

== Career ==
Hedegaard made his debut for Denmark against the Netherlands in 1991. Later that year he played for Denmark Under-19s, playing two matches against Bermuda Under-19s and Ireland Under-19s. In that same year, he toured England with Denmark, playing a single match against Durham (then still a minor county). In 1992, he made two appearances against Wales, while the following season he played two matches against the Netherlands. Further appearances came in 1994 and 1995, before he appeared in the 1996 European Cricket Championship, held in Denmark, with Hedegaard making four appearances in it. In 1997, he played in his first ICC Trophy, appearing in its sixth edition in Malaysia, with him making nine appearances during the tournament. He scored 122 runs at an average of 20.33, with a high score of 52 not out against Argentina. With the ball, he took 9 wickets at a bowling average of 13.44, including a five wicket haul against Malaysia, when he took figures of 5/19 from ten overs.

Hedegaard toured Namibia in 1998, making five appearances on the tour, before appearing later that year in the European Cricket Championship in the Netherlands, making five appearances in that tournament. This was also the same year he took over as Denmark captain from Søren Henriksen. In March 1999, he toured Zimbabwe with Denmark, making appearances against provincial teams such as Mashonaland, Mashonaland Country Districts and Manicaland. Hedegaard made his List A debut for Denmark later in 1999 against the Kent Cricket Board in English domestic crickets NatWest Trophy, with him captaining Denmark in what was their first appearance in List A cricket. In 2000, he appeared in the ICC Emerging Nations Tournament in Zimbabwe, where he made a further five List A appearances against Zimbabwe A, the Netherlands, Scotland, Ireland and Kenya. Hedegaard struggled with the bat in the tournament, scoring just 23 runs at an average of 5.75, while with the ball he took 5 wickets at an average of 28.60. He captained Denmark in the 2001 ICC Trophy in Canada, making eight appearances, in what was to be his last appearance in the ICC Trophy. He scored 122 at an average of 17.42 during the tournament, with a high score of 55 coming against Bermuda.

Though he missed a List A match in the 2002 Cheltenham & Gloucester Trophy, he did return to captain Denmark in the 2002 European Championship in Northern Ireland, making five appearances. He relinquished the captaincy following the tournament, with Soren Vestergaard succeeding him. He returned to the Danish squad five years later during their tour to Kenya, playing matches against a Coast Cricket Association XI, a Kenya Select XI and Kenya A. In November 2007, he was selected in Denmark's squad for the World Cricket League Division Two in Namibia, where he made six List A appearances. He scored 61 runs at an average of 12.20 in the tournament. He later played in the 2008 European Championship Division One, making four appearances, before being selected in Denmark's fifteen man squad for the 2009 World Cup Qualifier in South Africa. Hedegaard made five List A appearances during the tournament, the last of which came against Uganda. He scored 40 runs at an average of 10.00 during the tournament, while with the ball he took 3 wickets at an expensive average of 59.00. Denmark finished the tournament in the twelfth and last place, therefore failing to qualify for the 2011 World Cup. This tournament also marked his final List A appearances. Having played a total of seventeen matches in that format for his country, Hedegaard took 11 wickets at an average of 40.63, with best figures of 3/42. With the bat, he scored 129 runs at an average of 9.21, with a high score of 24 not out. This tournament also marked his final appearance for Denmark in any format.

His brother, Lars, has also played for Denmark.
