= United Arab Emirates cricket team in Kenya in 2011 =

	Kenya	United Arab Emirates
- Dates: 25 July – 31 July 2011

The United Arab Emirates toured Kenya from 25 to 31 July 2011. The tour consisted of one ICC Intercontinental Cup match and a pair of List A matches for the 2011–13 ICC Intercontinental Cup One-Day.

== Intercontinental Cup ==
28 – 31 July 2011
Scorecard

United Arab Emirates	v	Kenya
213 (67.3 overs); Khurram Khan 85 (143); Hiren Varaiya 4/45 (16.3 overs)		219 (70.5 overs); Rajesh Bhudhia 44 (41); Amjad Javed 3/43 (17 overs)
439/8d (114.2 overs); Saqib Ali 153 (285); Lucas Oluoch 3/63 (21 overs)		167 (61.1 overs); Collins Obuya 63 (100); Mohammed Tauqir 2/35 (17 overs)

United Arab Emirates won by 266 runs
Nairobi Gymkhana Club, Nairobi, Kenya
Umpires: Shaun George (SA) and Russell Tiffin (Zim)

- United Arab Emirates won the toss and elected to bat
- Points: United Arab Emirates 14, Kenya 6

== Intercontinental Cup One-Day ==
=== 1st List A ===
25 July 2011
Scorecard

Kenya; 210 (49.3 overs)	v	United Arab Emirates; 119/8 (35 overs)
Tanmay Mishra 66 (92); Shoaib Sarwar 5/23 (10 overs)		Amjad Ali 30 (31); Rajesh Bhudia 5/21 (7 overs)

Kenya won by 66 runs (D/L)
Gymkhana Club Ground, Nairobi
Umpires: Shaun George (SA) and Russell Tiffin (Zim)

- Kenya won the toss and elected to bat.
- Rain stopped play after 35 overs in the United Arab Emirates' innings, revising the target to 186 runs from 35 overs via the Duckworth–Lewis method.
- Points: Kenya 2, United Arab Emirates 0.

=== 2nd List A ===
26 July 2011
Scorecard

Kenya; 230/9 (50 overs)	v	United Arab Emirates; 233/6 (46.4 overs)
Rakep Patel 124 (154); Saqib Ali 3/28 (8 overs)		Khurram Khan 65* (60); Lucas Oluoch 2/46 (7.4 overs)

United Arab Emirates won by 4 wickets
Gymkhana Club Ground, Nairobi
Umpires: Shaun George (SA) and Russell Tiffin (Zim)

- United Arab Emirates won the toss and elected to field.
- Points: United Arab Emirates 2, Kenya 0.
