= Lars Hedegaard Andersen =

Danish cricketer (born 1975)

Personal information
- Full name: Lars Hedegaard Andersen
- Born: 14 August 1975 (age 51); Grenå, Norddjurs Municipality, Denmark
- Batting: Right-handed
- Bowling: Right-arm medium
- Relatives: Morten Hedegaard (brother)

International information
- National side: Denmark

Domestic team information
- Years: Team
- 1999–2003: Denmark

Career statistics
Competition	List A
Matches	13
Runs scored	167
Batting average	16.70
100s/50s	–/–
Top score	46*
Balls bowled	384
Wickets	5
Bowling average	47.00
5 wickets in innings	–
10 wickets in match	–
Best bowling	2/21
Catches/stumpings	5/–
- Source: Cricinfo, 14 January 2011

Lars Hedegaard Andersen (born 14 August 1975) is a former Danish cricketer. Hedegaard was a right-handed batsman who bowled right-arm medium pace. He was born at Grenå, Norddjurs Municipality.

== Career ==
Hedegaard made a single appearance for Denmark Under-19s against Bangladesh Under-19s in the 1994 Malaysia International Youth Cricket Tournament. His senior debut for Denmark came in the 1997 ICC Trophy against Malaysia, with him making four appearances during the tournament. He scored 15 runs in the tournament, as well as taking a single wicket. In March 1998, he toured Namibia, before playing four matches in the 1998 European Championship later that year. In 1999, he toured Zimbabwe with Denmark, making appearances against provincial teams such as Mashonaland, Mashonaland Country Districts and Manicaland. Hedegaard made his List A debut for Denmark later in 1999 against the Kent Cricket Board in English domestic cricket's NatWest Trophy, with him captaining Denmark in what was their first appearance in List A cricket. In 2000, he appeared in the ICC Emerging Nations Tournament in Zimbabwe, where he made a further five List A appearances against Zimbabwe A, the Netherlands, Scotland, Ireland and Kenya. Hedegaard struggled with the bat in the tournament, scoring just 37 runs at an average of 12.33, while with the ball he took 2 wickets at an average of 51.50. Later in 2000, he played a further List A match against the Durham Cricket Board in English domestic cricket's NatWest Trophy.

He was part of Denmark's squad for the 2001 ICC Trophy in Canada, playing eight matches, in what was to be his last appearance in the ICC Trophy. He scored 139 runs at an average of 34.75 in the tournament, with a high score of 38. With the ball, he took 10 wickets at a bowling average of 16.60, with best figures of 5/24. These figures, which were his only five wicket haul in the tournament, came against Papua New Guinea. In July 2002, he made five appearances in the European Championship, while the following month he made a further List A appearance for Denmark against the Leicestershire Cricket Board in the 1st round of English domestic cricket's 2003 Cheltenham & Gloucester Trophy, which was played in August 2002 to avoid fixture congestion early in the 2002 season. His next appearance for Denmark came in the 2004 European Championship Division One, where he made three appearances.

He missed out on selection for the 2005 ICC Trophy, next appearing for Denmark in a two match series against Bermuda in 2007, while later in 2007 he was part of Denmark's tour to Kenya, playing two matches against Coast Cricket Association XI and a Kenya Select XI. In November 2007, he was selected in Denmark's squad for the World Cricket League Division Two in Namibia, where he made five List A appearances, the last of which came against Argentina. He scored 69 runs in the tournament at an average of 17.25, with a high score of 46 not out. These matches represented his final appearances in List A cricket, with Hedegaard having represented his country in thirteen List A matches, scoring 167 runs at an average of 16.70, while with the ball he took 5 wickets at an average of 47.00, with best figures of 2/21. He later played in the 2008 European Championship Division One, making four appearances. His final appearances for Denmark came in two warm-up matches for the 2009 World Cup Qualifier, against an Eastern Province Invitation XI and Grahamstown. However, Hedegaard was not a part of the main squad for the tournament.

His brother, Morten, has played for and captained Denmark.
