= Agustín Casime =

Argentine cricketer (born 1985)

Personal information
- Full name: Agustín Leandro Casime
- Born: 12 July 1985 (age 41); Buenos Aires, Argentina
- Batting: Right-handed
- Bowling: Right-arm fast-medium

Career statistics
Competition	LA
Matches	2
Runs scored	120
Batting average	0.00
100s/50s	0/0
Top score	0
Balls bowled	42
Wickets	1
Bowling average	56.00
5 wickets in innings	0
10 wickets in match	0
Best bowling	1/25
Catches/stumpings	2/0
- Source: CricketArchive, 21 April 2009

Agustín Leandro Casime (born 12 July 1985) is an Argentine cricketer who has played for the national side at List A level.

At the age of 15, Casime was part of the Argentina A squad that won the South American Championship in 2000, and noted in Cricinfo's report as one who shone in the competition. The following year, Casime was selected as a reserve for the Argentina team for the 2001 ICC Trophy, although he did not play in the tournament itself. He played several times for Argentina Under-19s and Argentina A in the next few years.

On 24 November 2007, Casime made his List A debut for the full national side in an 18-run defeat against Oman as part of the 2007 ICC World Cricket League Division Two competition. He did not bat, but claimed the single wicket of Omani opener Nilesh Parmar. Three days later Casime played against the UAE, but although he took two catches he was dismissed for nought. Argentina were completely outclassed and were crushed by 304 runs.
