= Bobby Chawla =

Danish cricketer (born 1982)

Personal information
- Full name: Ajay Bobby Chawla
- Born: 2 December 1982 (age 43); Frederiksberg, Denmark
- Nickname: Bobstar
- Batting: Right-handed
- Bowling: Leg break

International information
- National side: Denmark

Domestic team information
- Years: Team
- 2000–2012: Denmark

Career statistics
Competition	List A	Twenty20
Matches	23	8
Runs scored	133	17
Batting average	8.31	4.25
100s/50s	0/0	0/0
Top score	31	7
Balls bowled	920	186
Wickets	22	8
Bowling average	32.59	27.25
5 wickets in innings	0	0
10 wickets in match	0	0
Best bowling	4/38	3/19
Catches/stumpings	5/–	1/–
- Source: Cricinfo, 25 March 2012

Ajay Bobby Chawla (born 2 December 1982) is a Danish cricketer. He is a right-handed batsman who bowls leg break.

== Career ==
Born in Frederiksberg, Chawla began playing cricket at age 9. He represented Denmark at the under-19 level, Chawla made his full debut for Denmark in a List A match against the Durham Cricket Board in the English domestic one-day tournament, the 2000 NatWest Trophy. In that same year, he played in the European Championships in Scotland. The following year, he played for Denmark in the 2001 ICC Trophy in Canada, making six appearances. In August 2001, he played his second List A match, against Suffolk in the 1st round of the 2002 Cheltenham & Gloucester Trophy, which was played in 2001 to avoid fixture congestion. A further List A appearance came the following year in the 1st round of the 2003 Cheltenham & Gloucester Trophy against the Leicestershire Cricket Board, played to the same arrangement as the previous season's fixture. Two further appearances in that format followed, in the 2004 Cheltenham & Gloucester Trophy against Wales Minor Counties and in the 2005 Cheltenham & Gloucester Trophy against Northamptonshire at Svanholm Park, Brøndby. This was Denmark's last appearance in English domestic one-day cricket, with all their prior results having been mostly heavy defeats.

Also in 2005, Chawla appeared in his second and final ICC Trophy, which was held in Ireland. The International Cricket Council afforded List A status to these matches, with Chawla making seven appearances during the tournament, taking 9 wickets at an average of 23.22, with best figures of 3/42. Later in 2007, Chawla was selected as part of Denmark's squad for the World Cricket League Division Two in Namibia. Chawla made a further four List A appearances during the tournament, taking 10 wickets at an average of 15.20, with best figures of 4/38. Two years later, he was selected as part of Denmark's squad for the World Cup Qualifier in South Africa, where he made seven List A appearances, including his final appearance to date in that format, against Oman. He struggled with the ball during the tournament, taking just 2 wickets at an expensive average of 115.00.

In 2011, Chawla was selected in Denmark's squad for the 2011 ICC World Cricket League Division Three tournament in Hong Kong, making four appearances. In March 2012, Denmark took part in the World Twenty20 Qualifier in the United Arab Emirates, with Chawla selected in their fourteen-man squad. Chawla made his Twenty20 debut during the tournament against Bermuda at the Sharjah Cricket Association Stadium. He made six further appearances during the competition, the last of which came against Oman, taking 6 wickets during the tournament, at an average of 20.33 and with best figures of 3/19. In August 2012, he was selected in Denmark's fourteen-man squad for the World Cricket League Division Four in Malaysia.

Outside of cricket, Chawla works as a banker.
