= Marlon Bryan =

Cayman Islands cricketer

Marlon Orlando Bryan is a cricket player who plays for Cayman Islands national cricket team. He was born in Cayman Islands on October 22, 1986. He is a right hand batsman and right arm medium - fast bowler.

== Career ==
Marlon Orlando Bryan had played for Cayman Islands national cricket team in the 2010 ICC World Cricket League Division Four. He declined the batting -line up of Argentina national cricket team on 16 August 2010 by picking 3 wickets for just 32 runs in 10 overs. This helped Cayman Islands to beat Argentina in the match.
