= Afghan cricket team in the United Arab Emirates in 2011–12 =

Afghanistan cricket team in UAE 2011
	Afghanistan	UAE
- Dates: 5 October – 12 October 2011
Captains	Nowroz Mangal	Arshad Ali

The Afghanistan national cricket team toured the United Arab Emirates (UAE) from 5 to 12 October 2011. The tour consisted of one ICC Intercontinental Cup match and a pair of ICC Intercontinental Cup One-Day matches against the United Arab Emirates national cricket team.

== Intercontinental Cup ==
5–8 October 2011
Scorecard

Afghanistan	v	United Arab Emirates
328 (112.4 overs); Mohammad Nabi 117 (195); Arshad Ali 6/45 (19.4 Overs)		462 (117.1 Overs); Bakhtiyar Palekar 76 (60); Dawlat Zadran 4/98 (22 Overs)
131/7 (80 Overs); Javed Ahmadi 49 (84); Arshad Ali 3/30 (16 Overs)		228 (73 Overs); Swapnil Patil 79 (137); Mirwais Ashraf 4/20 (13 Overs)

Match drawn
Sharjah Cricket Association Stadium, Sharjah, UAE
Umpires: Ahsan Raza (Pak) and Buddhi Pradhan (Nep)

- United Arab Emirates won the toss and elected to bat
- Points: Afghanistan 3, United Arab Emirates 9

== Intercontinental Cup One-Day ==
=== 1st match ===
10 October 2011
Scorecard

United Arab Emirates; 198 (44.3 overs)	v	Afghanistan; 183 (48.3 overs)
Khurram Khan 53 (48); Dawlat Zadran 3/24 (7 overs)		Gulbodin Naib 43 (55); Khurram Khan 4/25 (9.3 overs)

United Arab Emirates won by 15 runs
Sharjah Cricket Association Stadium, Sharjah, UAE
Umpires: Ahsan Raza (Pak) and Buddhi Pradhan (Nep)

- United Arab Emirates won the toss and elected to bat
- Points: United Arab Emirates 2, Afghanistan 0

=== 2nd match ===
12 October 2011
Scorecard

United Arab Emirates; 221/8 (50 overs)	v	Afghanistan; 152 (44.4 overs)
Khurram Khan 43 (49); Amir Hamza 3/43 (8 overs)		Asghar Stanikzai 33 (69); Khurram Khan 3/29 (9 overs)

United Arab Emirates won by 69 runs
Sharjah Cricket Association Stadium, Sharjah, UAE
Umpires: Ahsan Raza (Pak) and Buddhi Pradhan (Nep)

- United Arab Emirates won the toss and elected to bat
- Points: United Arab Emirates 2, Afghanistan 0
