= David Borchersen =

Danish cricketer

Personal information
- Full name: David Østervig Borchersen
- Born: 19 April 1978 (age 48); Bjæverskov, Køge Municipality, Denmark
- Batting: Right-handed
- Bowling: Right-arm medium

International information
- National side: Denmark (1997–2011)

Career statistics
Competition	List A
Matches	18
Runs scored	195
Batting average	13.00
100s/50s	–/–
Top score	36*
Balls bowled	730
Wickets	22
Bowling average	26.54
5 wickets in innings	–
10 wickets in match	–
Best bowling	4/43
Catches/stumpings	5/–
- Source: Cricinfo, 13 September 2012

David Østervig Borchersen (né Christiansen; born 19 April 1978) is a Danish cricketer. Borchersen is a right-handed batsman who bowls right-arm medium pace. He was born at Bjæverskov, Køge Municipality.

== Career ==
Borchersen played for Denmark Under-19s in the 1997 International Youth Tournament in Bermuda, making his debut for the team against the Netherlands Under-19s. His senior debut for Denmark also came in 1997, in a minor match against Scotland. He later played for the team in the 1998 Under-19 World Cup, making his Youth One Day International (YODI) debut against Ireland Under-19s. He made five further YODI appearances during the tournament, the last of which came against Namibia Under-19s. His next appearance for Denmark came in 2003, in a minor match against Ireland. Two years later he was selected in Denmark's squad for the 2005 ICC Trophy in Ireland. The International Cricket Council afforded List A status to these matches, with Borchersen making his debut in that format against Uganda. He made six further List A appearances during the tournament, the last of which came against Namibia. He took 11 wickets during the tournament at an average of 23.18, with best figures of 3/29. With the bat, he scored 60 runs at a batting average of 10.00, with a high score of 23.

The following year, he played in the 2006 European Championship Division One, making a single appearance in the tournament against Ireland. In 2007, he toured Kenya, playing two matches against a Kenya Select XI and a Coast Cricket Association XI. Later that year, he was selected as part of Denmark's squad for the World Cricket League Division Two in Namibia, making four List A appearances. He scored 36 runs with the bat with a top score of 15. With the ball, he took 4 wickets at an average of 26.25, with best figures of 2/29. In 2008, he played in the European Championship Division One in Ireland, making two appearances against Scotland and Norway. In 2009, he was selected in Denmark's squad for the World Cup Qualifier in South Africa, where he made seven List A appearances, including his final appearance to date in that format, against Oman. He scored 99 runs during the tournament at average of 19.80, with a high score of 36 not out. With the ball, he took 7 wickets at an average of 32.00, with best figures of 4/43. Denmark finished the tournament in twelfth and last place, therefore failing to qualify for the 2011 World Cup. Since his List A debut for Denmark in 2005, Borchensen had made eighteen appearances in that format, scoring 195 runs at an average of 13.00, while with the ball he took 22 wickets at an average of 26.54.

Borchensen played for Denmark in the 2010 European Championship Division One. In 2011, he was selected in Denmark's squad for the 2011 ICC World Cricket League Division Three tournament in Hong Kong, making three appearances during the tournament against Italy, the United States and Hong Kong. This was the last time to date that he has represented Denmark at any level.
