= Deon Kotzé =

Namibian cricketer (born 1973)

Personal information
- Full name: Deon Bosman Kotze
- Born: 12 September 1973 (age 53); Windhoek, South West Africa
- Batting: Right-handed
- Bowling: Right-arm off break
- Role: All-rounder
- Relatives: Björn Kotzé (brother)

International information
- National side: Namibia (1994–2009)
- ODI debut (cap 6): 10 February 2003 v Zimbabwe
- Last ODI: 3 March 2003 v Netherlands

Career statistics
Competition	ODI	FC	LA
Matches	6	21	64
Runs scored	82	619	1,111
Batting average	16.40	18.75	21.36
100s/50s	0/0	0/4	0/4
Top score	27	64	81*
Balls bowled	282	2,526	2,763
Wickets	2	50	53
Bowling average	128.00	23.26	35.05
5 wickets in innings	0	1	0
10 wickets in match	0	0	0
Best bowling	1/32	7/57	3/4
Catches/stumpings	3/–	16/–	16/–
- Source: ESPNcricinfo, 22 June 2017

Deon Bosman Kotzé (born 12 September 1973) is a former Namibian cricketer, who played for and captained Namibia's national cricket team. He was a right-handed batsman and a right-arm off-break bowler.

Kotzé played six One Day Internationals in the Cricket World Cup in 2003, when he captained Namibia. He played in the ICC Trophy and other ICC List A competitions from 1994, when he made his debut against Israel, until 2009, when he played in the World Cup qualifiers.
