= Damali Bell =

Bermudian cricketer

Personal information
- Full name: Damali Ishmael Robert Bell
- Born: 26 March 1992 (age 34); Bermuda
- Batting: Right-handed
- Bowling: Left-arm medium

International information
- National side: Bermuda

Career statistics
Competition	List A
Matches	4
Runs scored	14
Batting average	7.00
100s/50s	–/–
Top score	8
Balls bowled	198
Wickets	7
Bowling average	31.28
5 wickets in innings	–
10 wickets in match	–
Best bowling	2/33
Catches/stumpings	1/–
- Source: Cricinfo, 20 February 2012

Damali Ishmael Robert Bell (born 26 March 1992) is a Bermudian cricketer. Bell is a right-handed batsman who bowls left-arm medium pace. He was born in Bermuda and was educated at The Berkeley Institute, Bermuda.

Bell was selected in Bermuda's squad for the 2011 World Cricket League Division Two in the United Arab Emirates. It was during this tournament that Stovell made his List A debut against Papua New Guinea. He made three further List A appearances during the tournament, the last of which came against Namibia. He took 7 wickets during the tournament, at an average of 31.28, with best figures of 2/33. Bermuda were relegated at the end of the tournament to the 2013 World Cricket League Division Three.

Bell also played football, representing his country during 2007 CONCACAF U17 Tournament qualification. He played club football with Boulevard Blazers F.C. and X-Roads Warriors F.C.

== Personal life ==
He is the nephew of legendary cricketer and footballer Calvin Symonds.
