= Max Overgaard =

Danish cricketer (born 1978)

Personal information
- Full name: Max Thor Overgaard
- Born: 1 March 1978 (age 48); Skovbo, Roskilde County, Denmark
- Batting: Right-handed
- Bowling: Right-arm medium
- Role: Occasional wicket-keeper

International information
- National side: Denmark

Domestic team information
- Years: Team
- 2005: Denmark

Career statistics
| Competition | List A |
|---|---|
| Matches | 9 |
| Runs scored | 105 |
| Batting average | 13.12 |
| 100s/50s | –/– |
| Top score | 24 |
| Balls bowled | 25 |
| Wickets | – |
| Bowling average | – |
| 5 wickets in innings | – |
| 10 wickets in match | – |
| Best bowling | – |
| Catches/stumpings | 2/– |
- Source: CricketArchive, 16 January 2011

Max Overgaard (born 1 March 1978) is a Danish cricketer. He has played for the Denmark national cricket team since 2003, having previously represented Denmark Under-19s and Denmark A. He has played one List A match for Denmark against Northamptonshire in the 2005 C & G Trophy, Denmark's final appearance in the tournament.

He represented Denmark Under-19 in two International Youth Tournaments, in the Netherlands in 1995 and Bermuda in 1997. He represented Denmark A in the European Development XI championship in 2001. He made his debut for the senior side on 27 July 2003, playing against the Netherlands in Brøndby and played in the European Championship the following year. After his List A debut in 2005 he spent a short time out of the Danish side, returning for matches against various teams in the Netherlands in 2007.
