= Kevin Bazil =

Guyanese cricketer (born 1989)

Personal information
- Born: 24 November 1989 (age 36)

International information
- National side: Cayman Islands
- Source: Cricinfo, 8 September 2017

Kevin Bazil (born 24 November 1989) is a Guyanese cricketer. He has played first-class cricket for Guyana. He was named in the Cayman Islands' squad for the 2017 ICC World Cricket League Division Five tournament in South Africa. He played in the Cayman Islands' opening fixture, against Qatar, on 3 September 2017.

== See also ==
- List of Guyanese representative cricketers
