= 2007 Kenya Twenty20 Quadrangular =

International cricket tournament

- Dates: 1 – 4 September 2007
- Cricket format: Twenty20, Twenty20 International
- Tournament format(s): Round Robin
- Host(s): Kenya
- Champions: Pakistan
- Runners-up: Bangladesh
- Participants: 4
- Matches: 6
- Player of the series: (Pakistan) Shoaib Malik (Bangladesh) Mohammad Ashraful
- Most runs: (Bangladesh) Nazimuddin (140)
- Most wickets: (Bangladesh) Mohammad Ashraful (6)

The 2007 Kenya Twenty20 Quadrangular was a Twenty20 International (T20I) cricket tournament held in Kenya from 1 to 4 September 2007. The four participating teams were Bangladesh, Kenya, Pakistan and Uganda (matches involving Uganda were not classed as T20I matches as the team did not hold such status). The matches were all played at the Gymkhana Club Ground in Nairobi.

For Bangladesh, Kenya and Pakistan, this tournament was a warm-up for the inaugural ICC World Twenty20 that was to be held later in September.

== Results ==
=== Matches ===
1 September 2007
09:30
Scorecard

Pakistan; 226/3 (20 overs)	v	Uganda; 78/7 (20 overs)
Salman Butt 74* (55); Joel Olwenyi 1/34 (4 overs)		Raymond Otim 27* (29); Babar Ali 2/10 (3 overs)

Pakistan won by 148 runs
Gymkhana Club Ground, Nairobi
Umpires: Rockie D'Mello (Ken) and Subhash Modi (Ken)
Player of the match: Shahid Afridi (Pak)

- Pakistan won the toss and elected to bat.

1 September 2007
14:00
Scorecard

Kenya; 138/7 (20 overs)	v	Bangladesh; 139/5 (17.4 overs)
Tanmay Mishra 38 (41); Abdur Razzak 2/22 (4 overs)		Nazimuddin 43 (37); Peter Ongondo 2/21 (4 overs)

Bangladesh won by 5 wickets
Gymkhana Club Ground, Nairobi
Umpires: Rockie D'Mello (Ken) and Subhash Modi (Ken)
Player of the match: Nazimuddin (Ban)

- Bangladesh won the toss and elected to field.
- Tamim Iqbal, Alok Kapali, Mahmudullah, Nazimuddin, Syed Rasel (Ban), Rajesh Bhudia, Jadavji Jesani, Jimmy Kamande, Tanmay Mishra, Collins Obuya, David Obuya, Thomas Odoyo, Peter Ongondo, Lameck Onyango, Steve Tikolo and Hiren Varaiya (Ken) all made their T20I debuts.

2 September 2007
09:30
Scorecard

Kenya; 132/6 (20 overs)	v	Uganda; 133/8 (19.5 overs)
Steve Tikolo 66 (57); Charles Waiswa 2/18 (4 overs)		Lawrence Sematimba 42 (35); Steve Tikolo 3/8 (4 overs)

Uganda won by 2 wickets
Gymkhana Club Ground, Nairobi
Umpires: Rockie D'Mello (Ken) and Subhash Modi (Ken)
Player of the match: Charles Waiswa (Uga)

- Uganda won the toss and elected to field.

2 September 2007
14:00
Scorecard

Pakistan; 191/7 (20 overs)	v	Bangladesh; 161/7 (20 overs)
Imran Nazir 49 (29); Mohammad Ashraful 3/42 (4 overs)		Nazimuddin 81 (50); Shahid Afridi 2/26 (4 overs)

Pakistan won by 30 runs
Gymkhana Club Ground, Nairobi
Umpires: Rockie D'Mello (Ken) and Subhash Modi (Ken)
Player of the match: Imran Nazir (Pak)

- Bangladesh won the toss and elected to field.
- Iftikhar Anjum, Yasir Arafat, Salman Butt and Misbah-ul-Haq (Pak) all made their T20I debuts.

4 September 2007
09:30
Scorecard

Bangladesh; 145/5 (20 overs)	v	Uganda; 124/9 (20 overs)
Mashrafe Mortaza 40* (20); Emmanuel Isaneez 2/21 (4 overs)		Joel Olwenyi 46 (36); Syed Rasel 2/19 (4 overs); Abdur Razzak 2/19 (4 overs)

Bangladesh won by 21 runs
Gymkhana Club Ground, Nairobi
Umpires: Isaac Oyieko (Ken) and Subhash Modi (Ken)
Player of the match: Mashrafe Mortaza (Ban)

- Bangladesh won the toss and elected to bat.

4 September 2007
14:00
Scorecard

Kenya; 92 (19.4 overs)	v	Pakistan; 93/2 (14 overs)
Collins Obuya 17 (23); Younis Khan 3/18 (3.4 overs)		Shoaib Malik 42 (33); Peter Ongondo 1/11 (3 overs)

Pakistan won by 8 wickets
Gymkhana Club Ground, Nairobi
Umpires: Isaac Oyieko (Ken) and Subhash Modi (Ken)
Player of the match: Younis Khan (Pak)

- Kenya won the toss and elected to bat.
- Alex Obanda, Tony Suji (Ken), Fawad Alam and Umar Gul (Pak) all made their T20I debuts.
