= Gowkaran Roopnarine =

Guyana-born American cricketer (born 1982)

Personal information
- Born: 24 February 1982 (age 44); Guyana
- Batting: Left-handed
- Role: Wicket-keeper

Career statistics
Competition	List A	Twenty20
Matches	7	1
Runs scored	173	2
Batting average	28.83	2.00
100s/50s	0/2	0/0
Top score	98	2
Catches/stumpings	2/–	0/–
- Source: CricketArchive, 2 November 2025

Gowkaran Roopnarine (born 24 February 1982) is a Guyana born American cricketer. A left-handed batsman and wicket-keeper, he has played for the United States national cricket team since 2005, including seven List A matches.

== Biography ==
Born in Guyana in 1982, Gowkaran Roopnarine first played for the US in the 2005 ICC Trophy. After playing in a warm-up match against Namibia, he played four matches in the tournament proper, scoring 98 in the ninth place play-off against Oman, his highest List A score.

He played in the following years ICC Americas Championship in Ontario, and most recently represented his country in Division Five of the World Cricket League in Jersey.
