= Bernardo Irigoyen =

Argentine cricketer (born 1969)

Personal information
- Full name: Bernardo Iritxity Irigoyen
- Born: 3 September 1969 (age 57); Buenos Aires, Argentina
- Batting: Right-handed
- Bowling: Right-arm medium

International information
- National side: Argentina

Career statistics
Competition	List A	ICC Trophy
Matches	6	17
Runs scored	61	200
Batting average	10.16	14.28
100s/50s	0/0	0/0
Top score	44	43
Balls bowled	–	474
Wickets	–	16
Bowling average	–	19.18
5 wickets in innings	–	0
10 wickets in match	–	0
Best bowling	–	4/13
Catches/stumpings	2/–	2/–
- Source: CricketArchive, 23 January 2011

Bernardo Irigoyen (born 3 September 1969) is an Argentine cricketer. He is a right-handed batsman and a right-arm medium-pace bowler who has played for Argentina since 1990. He was born in Buenos Aires.

Irigoyen made his debut in the first match of the 1990 ICC Trophy against Papua New Guinea. Irigoyen scored two ducks from three matches in the competition, though he returned to play in 1994. This time around, Irigoyen played much more impressively, and during this competition, he made the highest batting score of his ICC Trophy career of 43 runs.

His good form was to be repeated in the competition in 1997, as he made the second highest Argentine average of the competition, bettered only by teammate Matias Paterlini, the two shining lights in the Argentine attack in an otherwise unfulfilling ICC Trophy run. Irigoyen went nine years without representing his country, before being recalled in the Argentine squad for two matches during their winless ICC World Cricket League stint in 2006. Irigoyen has played as a lower-middle order batsman throughout over sixteen years representing his country.
