= Zahid Hussain (cricketer) =

Canadian cricketer (born 1974)

Personal information
- Born: 18 December 1974 (age 51); Sargodha, Punjab, Pakistan
- Batting: Right-handed
- Bowling: slow left arm orthodox

International information
- National side: Canada (2011-2012)
- ODI debut (cap 77): 19 September 2011 v Ireland
- Last ODI: 20 September 2011 v Ireland
- T20I debut (cap 35): 13 March 2012 v Netherlands
- Last T20I: 22 March 2012 v Ireland
- Source: ESPN cricinfo, 30 April 2020

Zahid Hussain (born 18 December 1974, in Sargodha, Punjab, Pakistan) is a Canadian former cricketer who played for the Canada national cricket team. Hussain previously also played first-class cricket in Pakistan, where he was a member of the Habib Bank Limited and Sargodha cricket teams.
