= Gerrie Snyman =

Namibian cricketer

Personal information
- Full name: Gerrie Snyman
- Born: 30 April 1981 (age 45); Windhoek, South West Africa
- Batting: Right-handed
- Bowling: Right-arm fast-medium
- Role: All-rounder

International information
- National side: Namibia
- ODI debut (cap 9): 10 February 2003 v Zimbabwe
- Last ODI: 3 March 2003 v Netherlands
- ODI shirt no.: 88

Career statistics
Competition	ODI	FC	LA	T20
Matches	5	70	128	53
Runs scored	5	4,313	3,917	1,146
Batting average	1.25	36.86	34.97	23.38
100s/50s	0/0	5/25	4/27	0/6
Top score	5	230	196	92*
Balls bowled	288	5,186	4,243	827
Wickets	6	74	107	31
Bowling average	46.83	40.52	30.69	33.25
5 wickets in innings	0	1	1	0
10 wickets in match	0	0	0	0
Best bowling	3/69	5/53	5/36	4/30
Catches/stumpings	0/–	36/–	32/–	7/–
- Source: ESPNcricinfo, 22 June 2017

Gerrie Snyman (born 30 April 1981) is a Namibian former cricketer. He is a right-handed batsman and a right-arm medium-fast bowler. He played five One Day Internationals in the Cricket World Cup in 2003, and also played in the 2005 ICC Trophy. He has also played List A cricket and first-class cricket. Snyman retired from cricket in February 2018.

== Career ==
In January 2007 he hit the first century of his career, against Easterns - and managed his first five-wicket innings eleven months later against Uganda in the ICC World Cricket League. Snyman played for Walsall in the Birmingham League during 2006 and signed for Staffordshire for 2007.

Gerrie was the overseas player at Tamworth cricket club during the 2003 and 2004 season before moving to Walsall Cricket Club during the 2006 and 2007 seasons. He played a big part in the 2006 side that won the Birmingham League Premier Division. He also played three matches in the Second XI Championship in 2006 and 2007 for Worcestershire and Warwickshire.

In a game against the United Arab Emirates on 28 November 2007, Snyman hit a then world record 17 sixes in a single limited overs innings, culminating in a final score of 196 from 113 balls.

Against Kenya in the 2007-08 ICC Intercontinental Cup he brought up his maiden first-class double century. Snyman's innings of 230 came from just 201 deliveries and included 11 sixes. His innings was all the more remarkable in that Namibia were all out for 282, so he made 82% of the team total, with the second top scorer Michael Durandt making only 13. Snyman then repeated the feat 4 years later against the same opponents in the 2011-13 ICC Intercontinental Cup, scoring 201 not out from 192 deliveries, which included 7 sixes.

He was named in the team of the tournament after the ICC Intercontinental Cup in 2007–08.
