= Hernán Williams =

Argentine cricketer (born 1985)

Personal information
- Born: 30 December 1985 (age 40); Buenos Aires, Argentina

International information
- National side: Argentina
- Source: Cricinfo, 14 July 2015

Hernán Williams (born 30 December 1985) is an Argentine cricketer. He played in the 2013 ICC World Cricket League Division Six tournament. He was part of Argentina's squad for the 2007 ICC World Cricket League Division Two tournament in Windhoek, Namibia, where he made his List A debut.
