= Esteban Nino =

Argentine cricketer

Personal information
- Full name: Esteban Miguel Nino
- Born: 5 May 1986 (age 40); Buenos Aires, Argentina
- Batting: Right-handed
- Bowling: Right-arm medium-fast

International information
- National side: Argentina
- T20I debut (cap 17): 10 November 2021 v Panama
- Last T20I: 14 November 2021 v Bermuda

Career statistics
Competition	T20I	LA	T20
Matches	2	6	2
Runs scored	1	4	1
Batting average	–	2.00	–
100s/50s	0/0	0/0	0/0
Top score	1*	4*	1*
Balls bowled	12	282	12
Wickets	0	4	0
Bowling average	–	78.75	–
5 wickets in innings	–	–	–
10 wickets in match	–	–	–
Best bowling	–	3/35	–
Catches/stumpings	0/–	3/–	0/–
- Source: Cricinfo, 29 November 2022

Esteban Nino (born May 5, 1986) is an Argentine cricketer. He is a right-handed batsman and a right-arm medium-fast bowler. He was born in Buenos Aires.

Nino's debut cricket match was contested between the North and South of Argentina, in 2002, Nino representing the North along with future first-class team-mates Gaston Arizaga and Alejandro Ferguson. The following year, Nino represented the youth national team in four games in the Americas Under-19 Championship, and again in the same competition during 2005.

In 2006, Nino played for the senior Argentine team for the first time, in Division Two of the ICC World Cricket League, playing games against Panama, Suriname and the Bahamas. Argentina were promoted from their group and Nino played in Division One games against United States, Canada and the Cayman Islands.

The World Cricket League was reformatted for 2007, and Argentina were placed in Division Three, where Nino played five games, and were promoted into the second division at the first attempt. Nino maintained a good bowling average, taking six wickets during the competition. Argentina were promoted at the end of the campaign into Division Two, despite losing their first fixture, a last-ball game against an Italian team including former Lancashire all-rounder Joe Scuderi. However, the team finished bottom of the table in the 2007-08 campaign.

In November 2021, he was named in Argentina's Twenty20 International (T20I) squad for the 2021 ICC Men's T20 World Cup Americas Qualifier tournament in Antigua. He made his T20I debut on 10 November 2021, for Argentina against Panama.
