= Trans Namib Ground =

Sports venue in Windhoek, Namibia

- Centre for Cricket Development Ground
- Interactive map of Trans Namib Ground

Ground information
- Location: Windhoek, Namibia
- Country: Namibia
- Coordinates: 22.593°S 17.036°E
- Establishment: 1998 (first recorded match)

International information
- First WT20I: 20 April 2022: Namibia v Zimbabwe
- Last WT20I: 26 April 2022: Namibia v Zimbabwe
- As of 26 April 2022; Source: Ground profile

Trans Namib Ground (also known as the Centre for Cricket Development Ground) is a cricket ground in Windhoek, Namibia. The first recorded match on the ground was in 1998 when a Windhoek Select XI played Denmark.

The ground held its first List A match in the 2001/02 6 Nations Challenge when Canada played the Netherlands. To date the ground has held 11 List A matches, the last of which saw Argentina play Uganda in the 2007 ICC World Cricket League Division Two.
