= Björn Kotzé =

Namibian cricketer (born 1978)

Personal information
- Full name: Bjorn Leo Kotze
- Born: 11 December 1978 (age 47); Windhoek, South West Africa
- Batting: Right-handed
- Bowling: Right-arm fast-medium
- Role: All-rounder
- Relatives: Deon Kotzé (brother)

International information
- National side: Namibia (1997–2015)
- ODI debut (cap 5): 10 February 2003 v Zimbabwe
- Last ODI: 27 February 2003 v Australia

Career statistics
Competition	ODI	FC	LA
Matches	5	24	67
Runs scored	27	748	584
Batting average	9.00	22.00	14.60
100s/50s	0/0	1/2	0/1
Top score	24*	163*	54*
Balls bowled	258	1,917	1,895
Wickets	3	46	58
Bowling average	92.00	20.71	29.34
5 wickets in innings	0	1	0
10 wickets in match	0	0	0
Best bowling	2/51	5/41	4/40
Catches/stumpings	1/–	18/–	17/–
- Source: ESPNcricinfo, 22 June 2017

Björn Leo Kotzé (born 11 December 1978) is a Namibian cricketer. He is a right-handed batsman and a right-arm medium-fast bowler.

He has appeared in the ICC Trophy since 1997 and made five One Day International appearances in the World Cup in 2003.

In 2007, Kotzé hit 163 not out against Canada in the ICC Trophy, beating his previous best innings in any fixture for the Namibian team by over 100 runs.
