= Matias Paterlini =

Argentine cricketer (born 1977)

Matías Paterlini
Personal information
- Born: 31 December 1977 (age 48); Buenos Aires, Argentina
- Batting: Right-handed
- Role: Opening batsman

International information
- National side: Argentina
- Source: Cricinfo, 15 July 2015

Matías Paterlini (born 31 December 1977) is an Argentine cricketer who plays as an opening batsman.

Paterlini has represented his national team since the mid-1990s. Growing up he has played cricket in his home country Argentina, as well as overseas in South Africa and England. Matias has had interest in cricket since his school-days and has represented his local cricket club St. Alban's Old Boys CC. He has played six List A games, amongst more than 250 other format matches, scoring 211 runs at an average of 42.20 with a high score 114 not out. He most recently played in the 2013 ICC World Cricket League Division Six tournament.
