= Donald Forrester =

Argentine cricketer (born 1969)

Personal information
- Born: 11 August 1969 (age 57); Buenos Aires, Argentina
- Batting: Right-handed
- Bowling: Right-arm off break; Right-arm medium

International information
- National side: Argentina

Career statistics
Competition	List A	ICC Trophy
Matches	6	20
Runs scored	105	457
Batting average	17.50	22.85
100s/50s	0/1	0/2
Top score	71	79
Balls bowled	168	693
Wickets	2	13
Bowling average	91.00	47.38
5 wickets in innings	0	0
10 wickets in match	0	0
Best bowling	1/42	3/66
Catches/stumpings	0/–	13/–
- Source: CricketArchive (subscription required), 23 January 2011

Donald Forrester (born 11 August 1969) is an Argentine cricketer. He is a right-handed batsman and a right-arm medium-pace bowler who has played for Argentina since 1990. Forrester debuted in the 1990 ICC Trophy, playing six games as an upper-middle order batsman, and appeared in the same Argentine team for the competition in 1994, 1997, and 2001. He was born at Buenos Aires in 1969.

Averaging 13 with the bat in his first ICC Trophy season, this increased in 1994, as Forrester scored his first of two half-centuries in the competition. Though he suffered from poor form in the 1997 competition, he was back to form in 2001, scoring one half century on his way to a solid average of just over 25. Forrester appeared with the Argentines in the 2004 Americas Championship, playing five games and once again, scoring a single half-century.

Forrester has been an upper-middle order batsman throughout over 15 years of competition. Donald Forrester's father, also named Donald, represented Argentina in first-class cricket during the 1937-38 season, rejoining the team nearly 20 years later. Forrester senior died in 1987. Frank Forrester, Donald's brother, represented the South of Argentina on seventeen occasions between 1962 and 1985.
