= Diego Lord =

Argentine cricketer (born 1977)

Personal information
- Full name: Diego Martin Lord
- Born: 26 September 1977 (age 49); Lomas de Zamora, Buenos Aires Province, Argentina
- Batting: Right-handed
- Bowling: Right-arm medium-fast

International information
- National side: Argentina

Career statistics
Competition	List A	ICC Trophy
Matches	6	7
Runs scored	50	1
Batting average	25.00	1.00
100s/50s	0/0	0/0
Top score	27*	1*
Balls bowled	342	204
Wickets	5	6
Bowling average	66.00	28.33
5 wickets in innings	0	0
10 wickets in match	0	0
Best bowling	3/45	2/16
Catches/stumpings	3/–	2/–
- Source: CricketArchive, 23 January 2011

Diego Lord (born 26 September 1977) is an Argentine cricketer who plays for Lomas Athletic Club. He is a right-handed batsman and a right-arm medium-fast bowler who has played for Argentina since 1997. He was born in Buenos Aires.

Lord made his ICC Trophy debut in 1997, in a defeat against Malaysia, taking one wicket, and being out for a duck in his team's batting innings. He played four more matches during the competition, scoring just one run in all the games combined, fewer than any other Argentine batsman who played more than one game in the competition.

He returned to play in the 2001 competition, fighting for a place in the tailend with teammates Martin Cortabarria and Hernan Pereyra, and despite being present in the batting lineup was not required to bat in a single innings for the team.

Lord played two games during a tour by Marylebone Cricket Club in 2001, and appeared in the 2004 Americas Championship, consistently finishing off the batting lineup with Pereyra.

Most recently, Lord has played in the 2006 ICC World Cricket League Americas Championship, playing all four matches in the Argentines' Division Two winning campaign, and during the winless Division One campaign of six months later. Lord has been a tailend batsman throughout nearly ten years in the Argentine squad. In the 2008 Americas Championship he picked up 3 for 26 from 10 overs versus Suriname.
