= Saqib Ali (cricketer) =

Emirati cricketer of Pakistani origin (born 1978)

Personal information
- Born: 14 April 1978 (age 48); Multan, Punjab, Pakistan
- Batting: Right-handed
- Bowling: Right-arm off-break
- Role: Batsman

International information
- National side: United Arab Emirates (2006–2015)
- ODI debut (cap 34): 24 June 2008 v Bangladesh
- Last ODI: 4 December 2014 v Afghanistan

Career statistics
Competition	ODI	FC	LA	T20
Matches	5	19	58	12
Runs scored	84	1,636	1,362	254
Batting average	21.00	51.12	26.19	25.40
100s/50s	0/0	6/6	0/9	0/1
Top score	25*	195	91	63
Balls bowled	60	659	690	114
Wickets	1	9	22	6
Bowling average	57.00	35.77	25.50	18.16
5 wickets in innings	0	0	0	0
10 wickets in match	0	0	0	0
Best bowling	1/44	3/84	3/13	2/9
Catches/stumpings	2/–	10/–	18/–	2/–
- Source: CricketArchive, 30 August 2015

Saqib Ali (born 14 April 1978) is a Pakistani-born retired cricketer who played for the United Arab Emirates national cricket team from 2006 to 2015, including in five One Day International (ODI) matches. He captained them to the ICC World Cricket League Division Two title in 2007.

Born in Multan, Saqib emigrated from Pakistan to the UAE in 1997, finding employment with NMC Health. In Pakistan, he had played two Tests and one ODI for the national under-19 team, as well as a single List A match for Rawalpindi A in November 1994 (aged 16). A right-handed middle order batsman, he made his national debut for the UAE at the 2006 EurAsia Cricket Series, and scored his maiden first-class hundred the following year, against Scotland at Sharjah. He was appointed captain in a match against Bermuda in 2007 and made 142 in his second innings after a duck in the first. His highest score was made in 2008 when he struck 195 out of his team's total of 306 as the UAE went down to Ireland.

Saqib retired from international cricket in August 2015, owing to a series of injuries.
