= Billy MacDermott =

Argentine cricketer

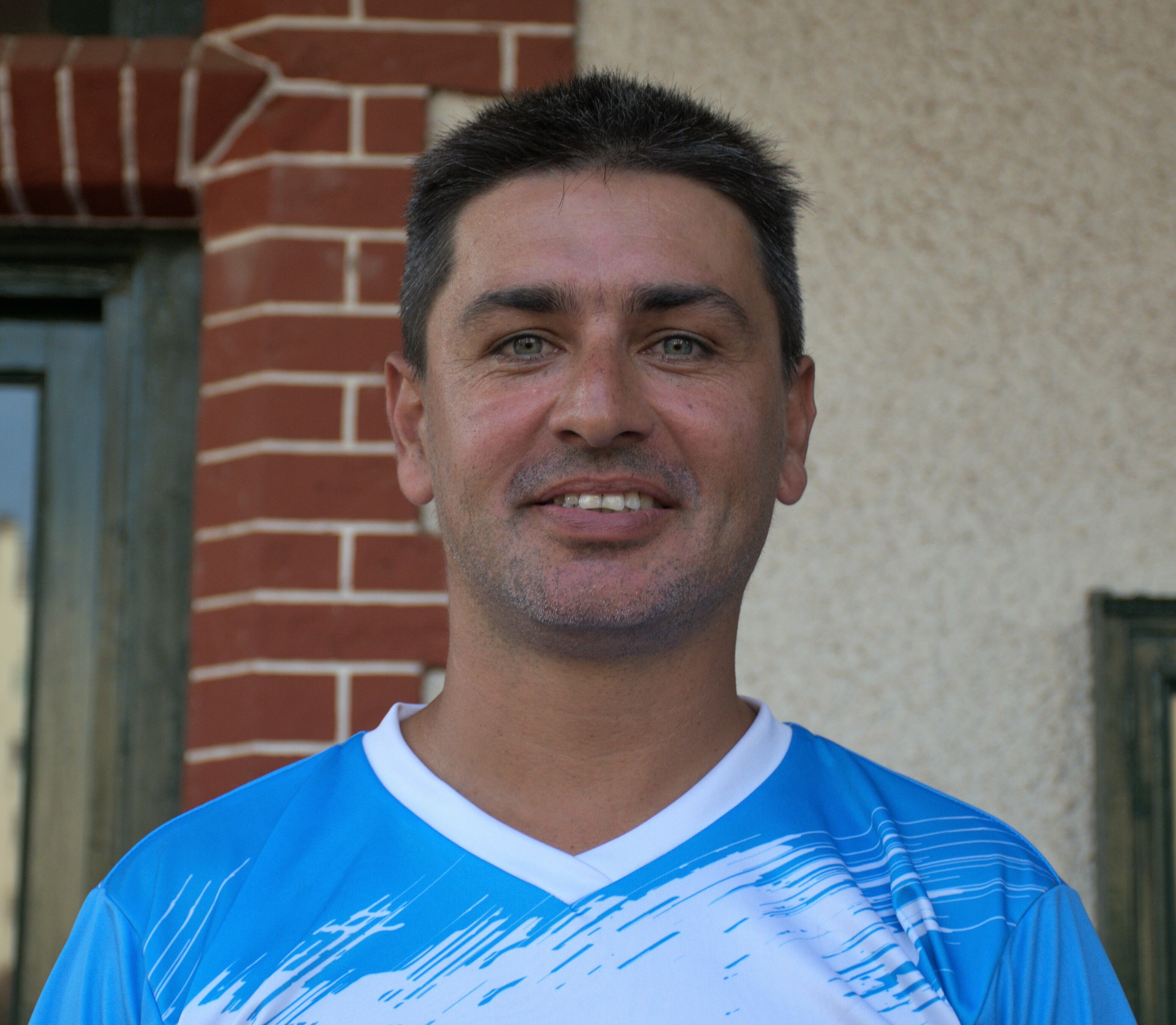

Personal information
- Full name: Esteban Alberto MacDermott
- Born: 2 September 1981 (age 45); Buenos Aires, Argentina
- Batting: Right-handed
- Bowling: Off break

International information
- National side: Argentina (1997–2014)

Career statistics
Competition	List A
Matches	6
Runs scored	74
Batting average	24.66
100s/50s	–/–
Top score	43*
Balls bowled	295
Wickets	4
Bowling average	63.50
5 wickets in innings	–
10 wickets in match	–
Best bowling	2/27
Catches/stumpings	1/–
- Source: CricketArchive, 23 January 2011

Esteban Alberto "Billy" MacDermott (born November 2, 1981) is an Argentine cricketer. He played for Argentina between 1997 and 2014, including six matches in 2007 ICC World Cricket League Division Two with List A status. He is a lower-order batsman and off spin bowler.

MacDermott played in America's Cup 2004, in Bermuda, playing every game on that tournament. He later debuted as captain in America's Division Two in April 2006, a competition which the Argentines won, and played four games during the competition, securing the award for the best fielder of the tournament.

MacDermott captained the team again in Division One of the same competition, playing three of Argentina's four games.

In 2007, MacDermott was captain of the Argentina team that played in the ICC World Cricket League Division 3 tournament in Darwin, Australia. Argentina made it through to the final, earning promotion for ICC World Cricket League Division Two. They lost the final to Uganda. MacDermott was named Player of the Tournament.

He played in the 2013 ICC World Cricket League Division Six tournament.
