= Gary Savage (cricketer) =

Argentine cricketer (born 1978)

Personal information
- Full name: Gary John Savage
- Born: 12 June 1978 (age 48); Port Elizabeth, Cape Province, South Africa
- Batting: Right-handed
- Bowling: Right-arm medium-fast

International information
- National side: Argentina

Career statistics
Competition	List A
Matches	6
Runs scored	81
Batting average	13.50
100s/50s	0/0
Top score	34
Balls bowled	324
Wickets	11
Bowling average	32.27
5 wickets in innings	0
10 wickets in match	0
Best bowling	4/57
Catches/stumpings	0/–
- Source: CricketArchive, 23 January 2011

Gary Savage (born 12 June 1978) is a South African-born Argentine cricketer who has played for Argentina since the 2006 season.

Savage debuted in Argentina's victorious World Cricket League performances of the first half of 2006, as the Argentine team were promoted from Division Two into Division One. These matches included one in which Savage scored a half-century, against Suriname.

Savage is a seam bowler who became the Division Two "Player of the Tournament" thanks to Argentina's charge toward promotion. He played in the 2013 ICC World Cricket League Division Six tournament.
