= Joel Olwenyi =

Ugandan cricketer (born 1980)

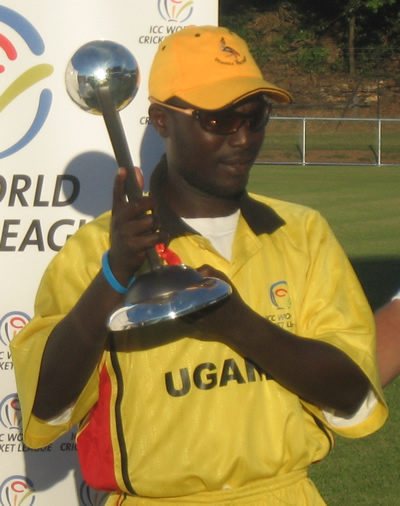

Personal information
- Full name: Joel Olwenyi
- Born: 28 August 1980 (age 46); Kampala, Uganda
- Batting: Right-handed
- Bowling: Right arm medium-fast
- Role: All-rounder

Career statistics
Competition	FC	LA
Matches	4	13
Runs scored	174	401
Batting average	21.75	36.45
100s/50s	–/1	1/2
Top score	51	126
Balls bowled	372	193
Wickets	6	9
Bowling average	31.66	16.66
5 wickets in innings	–	–
10 wickets in match	–	–
Best bowling	2/25	4/37
Catches/stumpings	3/–	5/–
- Source: CricketArchive, 25 January 2011

Joel Olwenyi (born 28 August 1980 in Kampala) is a Ugandan cricketer and former captain of the Uganda national side. A right-handed batsman and right-arm medium-fast bowler, Olwenyi has represented Uganda 13 times in the ICC Trophy. He featured for Uganda in ICC events and List A matches through the 2000s and captained the side victory in the 2007 ICC World Cricket League Division Three tournament in Darwin, Australia.

== Playing profile ==
- Full name: Joel Olwenyi.
- Born: 28 August 1980, Kampala, Uganda.
- Batting: Right-handed.
- Bowling: Right-arm-fast.
- Role: All-rounder / middle order batsman.

== Captaincy ==
In 2007, Olwenyi captained the national team in the ICC World Cricket League Division Three tournament which was held in Darwin, Australia. Uganda defeated Argentina in the final and earned promotion to division two.

== Honours ==
Olwenyi was named and crowned the league's man-of-the-series and their bowling work-horse Baig Akbar named the best bowler in the Bank of Baroda Cricket League in 2001.

== International career ==
Olwenyi represented Uganda in ICC tournaments and other official matches in the 2000s. Cricket statistical records list him as having played in ICC Trophy / ICC qualifying events for Uganda between 2001 and 2005 and in various List A and first-class fixtures for the national side.

=== 2007 ICC World Cricket League Division Three (Darwin) ===
In 2007 Olwenyi captained Uganda at the ICC World Cricket League Division Three tournament held in Darwin, Australia. Under his captaincy Uganda progressed to the final and defeated Argentina to win the tournament and secure promotion to Division Two. Olwenyi is pictured and referenced in tournament reports and national media as the victorious captain who lifted the trophy after the final.

ESPNcricinfo and tournament summaries record Uganda's run to the final and the final scorecard (Argentina v Uganda, 2 June 2007). Frank Nsubuga was player of the match in the final and the tournament reports note the team achievement and promotion.

=== Domestic & other achievements ===
- Olwenyi featured prominently in Uganda's domestic competitions and regional leagues. He was named man-of-the-series in the Bank of Baroda (Baroda / Baroda-style) cricket league in 2001, an honour reported in national press.
- Match photographs and captioned reports from international fixtures show Olwenyi contributing with bat and in the field for Uganda against opponents such as Kenya in regional T20/limited overs fixtures.

== Style of play and reputation ==
Olwenyi was widely regarded in Ugandan cricket circles as a dependable middle-order batsman who could contribute useful overs with medium-pace bowling. Contemporary match reports and retrospectives on Uganda's cricket history cite him among the leading players of his generation who helped elevate Uganda's standing in ICC associate competition in the 2000s.

== Legacy ==
Olwenyi's captaincy of the 2007 side that won Division Three remains a notable high point for Ugandan cricket; retrospective features mark that triumph as one of Uganda's memorable achievements on the international stage. The Daily Monitor's 2020 retrospective on the Darwin success highlights Olwenyi hoisting the trophy and remembers the squad's achievement.

== See also ==
- Arthur Kyobe - Ugandan cricketer.
- Roger Mukasa - Ugandan international cricketer.
- Nizakat Khan - Ugandan international cricketer
- Riazat Ali Shah - Ugandan international cricketer
