= Pedro Luis Bruno =

Argentine cricketer (born 1988)

Pedro Bruno
Personal information
- Full name: Pedro Luis Bruno
- Born: 25 May 1988 (age 38); Buenos Aires, Argentina
- Batting: Right-handed
- Bowling: Right-arm medium-fast

International information
- National side: Argentina
- T20I debut (cap 13): 8 November 2021 v Bahamas
- Last T20I: 14 November 2021 v Bermuda

Career statistics
Competition	T20I	LA	T20
Matches	6	3	6
Runs scored	56	8	56
Batting average	14.00	4.00	14.00
100s/50s	–/–	–/–	–/–
Top score	27	8	27
Balls bowled	0	1	0
Wickets	–	–	–
Bowling average	–	–	–
5 wickets in innings	–	–	–
10 wickets in match	–	–	–
Best bowling	–	–	–
Catches/stumpings	–/–	–/–	–/–
- Source: Cricinfo, 29 November 2022

Pedro Luis Bruno (born 25 May 1988) is an Argentine cricketer. He made his debut in List A cricket against Namibia as the first of three matches in the 2007 ICC World Cricket League Division Two, but he had no success in any of these games.

In November 2021, he was named in Argentina's Twenty20 International (T20I) squad for the 2021 ICC Men's T20 World Cup Americas Qualifier tournament in Antigua. He made his T20I debut on 8 November 2021, for Argentina against the Bahamas.
