= Argentina national cricket team =

National cricket team

Argentina
- Nickname: Sunny Ones
- Association: Argentine Cricket Association

Personnel
- Captain: Pedro Baron
- Coach: Gary Grewal

History
- First-class debut: v. (England) MCC at Buenos Aires; 18 February 1912
- List A debut: v. Oman at Windhoek, Namibia; 24 November 2007

International Cricket Council
- ICC status: Associate (1974; 52 years ago)
- ICC region: Americas
| ICC Rankings | Current | Best-ever |
| T20I | 51st | 48th (1 May 2020) |

International cricket
- First international: v. Uruguay, 1868

One Day Internationals
- World Cup Qualifier appearances: 6 (first in 1979)
- Best result: First round (1979; 1986–2001)

T20 Internationals
- First T20I: v. Mexico at El Cortijo Polo Club, Lima; 3 October 2019
- Last T20I: v. Cayman Islands at Jimmy Powell Oval, George Town; 15 March 2026
| T20Is | Played | Won/Lost |
| Total | 38 | 22/14 (0 ties, 2 no results) |
| This year | 6 | 4/2 (0 ties, 0 no results) |
T20I kit
- As of 15 March 2026

The Argentina national cricket team represents Argentina in international cricket. The team is organised by the Argentine Cricket Association (ACA), which became an associate member of the International Cricket Council (ICC) in 1974.

With the sport having been introduced by British immigrants, Argentina played its first international cricket match in 1868, against Uruguay, with fixtures against Brazil and Chile following in 1888 and 1893, respectively. Beginning in 1912, there were regular visits from English teams, including the Marylebone Cricket Club (MCC) on two occasions. On four of those tours, matches between the Argentine national side and the visiting team were accorded first-class status, making for 13 first-class matches in total between 1912 and 1938. Argentina, Brazil, and Chile, the mainstays of South American cricket, commenced regular international matches in the 1920s, which have continued into the present-day (with the exception of the World War II period). The South American Championship was created in 1995 by those three teams and Peru, and is now held annually. Argentina has been the dominant team at the championship, winning ten out of the sixteen tournaments held, and consequently has sent only development sides since 2000 (until 2019 when the matches in the event were eligible for Twenty20 International status for the first time).

Argentina made its ICC tournament debut at the 1979 ICC Trophy in England, which was the first event staged only for associate members. The team failed to appear at the subsequent 1982 edition, but from 1986 to 2001 appeared in five consecutive tournaments. However, Argentina only won its first match at the 1990 tournament, when it defeated East and Central Africa. The team won four matches in division two at the 2001 edition, but has made no further appearances in what has now been renamed the World Cup Qualifier. In the early 2000s, Argentina was one of the leading associates in the ICC Americas region, and in 2007, when the World Cricket League (WCL) was established, the side was placed into Division Three. Promoted into Division Two later in the year, it was immediately relegated, and continued to drop divisions over the following years. Finally, after placing fourth at the 2013 Division Six event, Argentina lost its place in the global tournament system. The team is yet to re-qualify, instead competing only in regional tournaments.

== History ==
=== Background ===
Cricket has been played in Argentina since 1806, with the international side making its first appearance in 1868 against Uruguay. Argentina faced Uruguay 29 times up until World War II, winning 21 of the matches. The team had previously played against Brazil in 1888 and then against Chile in 1893. For its first match against Chile, the national team had to travel to Santiago by crossing the Andes by mule, which took three and a half days.

=== First-class cricket ===
Argentina first played first-class cricket in 1912 against the Marylebone Cricket Club. The national team played a three match series against the visitors, winning the first game, but losing the second and third. The teams were made up almost exclusively of British expatriates who were mostly employed on the railways, in export or in farming.

Between the wars, infrequent fixtures were played against Brazil and Argentina, and were at that time included in Wisden's cricket records. First-class matches were played against an elderly MCC side in 1926/27, Sir Julien Cahn's XI in 1930 and Sir Theodore Brinckman's XI in 1937/38. The four-match series against the MCC was lost 2–1, with one game drawn. The three-match series against Sir Julien Cahn's XI finished with two draws, Cahn's XI winning the first game and the series against Brinkman's XI was drawn 1–1. That series was Argentina's last involvement in first-class cricket to date.

=== Players and clubs ===
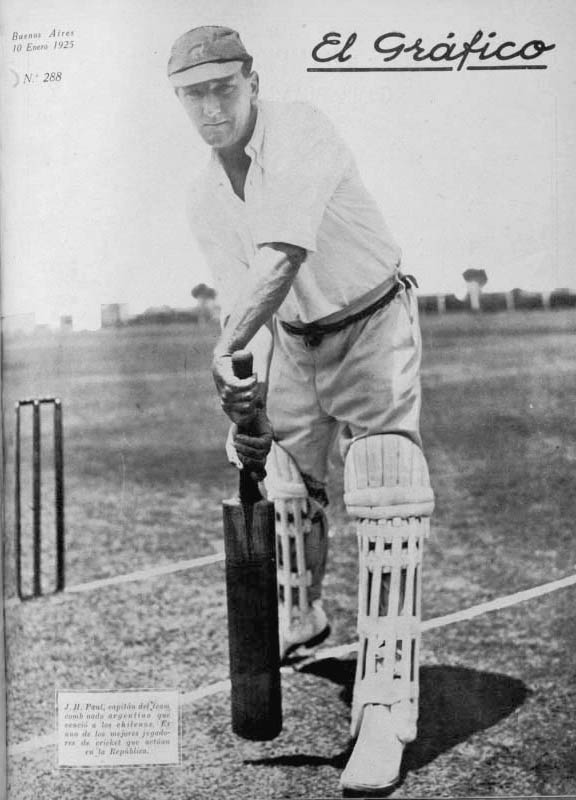
J.H. Paul, captain of the national team in 1925.

In 1932 a South American team consisting mainly of Argentine-based players toured England. It played seven first class matches and twelve other fixtures.

A two match series against Chile in December 1938 was won by Argentina, the second match of which saw the interesting occurrence of Argentina's Alfred Jackson playing against his brother John Jackson.

Leading players during this period were the Ayling brothers, K. Bush (who also played for Brazil), D. Cavanagh, Herbert Dorning (the so-called "Grand Old Man of Argentine Cricket") and Donald Forrester.

A strong club scene existed until the 1950s with clubs Belgrano, Buenos Aires, Lomas, and Hurlingham

This resulted in a relatively strong national side. Railway and Bank teams disbanded after the war along with the formerly strong San Isidro side. The national side sank to a low level, being heavily beaten by MCC in 1958–59.

By 2010, cricket had made some positive strides in Argentina even if the national side was struggling somewhat.

Old Georgian, Lomas, Belgrano, Hurlingham, and San Albano were as strong as they had been for some time along with Buenos Aires CRC, which was once again fielding sides after a long absence. Bedes Grammar School and Atlético del Rosario were both working their way through the lower divisions of the domestic league and supplying many players to the national age group squads, while an Academy side had been introduced into the First Division in response to the growing number of young players from the Italian/Spanish majority that were taking up the sport.

Previously the club competition had been kept alive largely by Anglo-Argentines – many of whom were descendants of well known cricketing identities in the country going right back to the early 20th century. In all, more than 30 teams at senior level comprised from the eight clubs were competing in four divisions and there was also a quickly growing ladies league.

=== ICC Trophy ===
Argentina participated in the first ICC Trophy in 1979 but missed the second in 1982 which was played in England and started only two days after the conclusion of Falklands War. They returned for the 1986 ICC Trophy and played in every one following that until the 2001 event. They did not qualify for the 2005 tournament.

=== Americas Championship ===
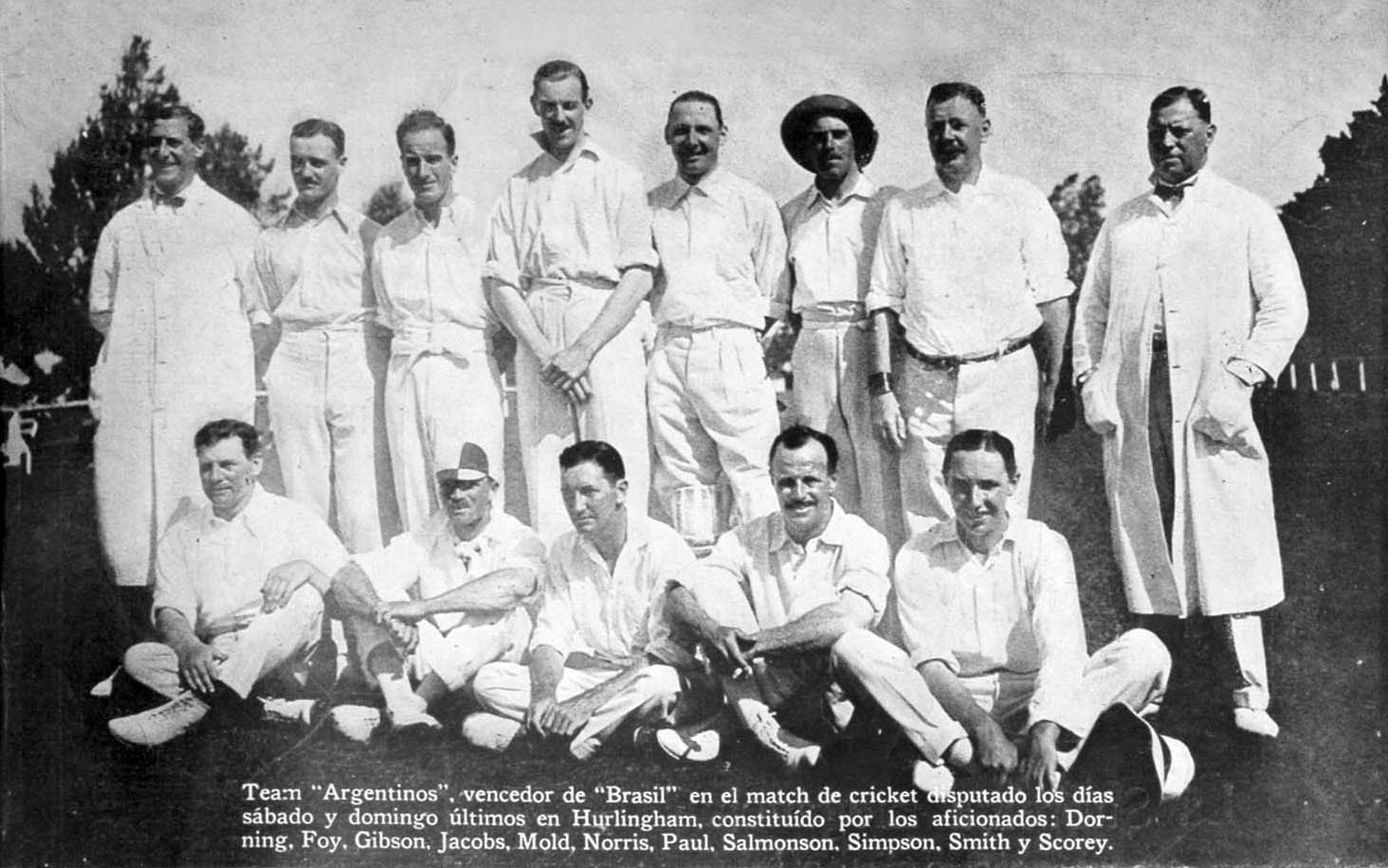
The Argentina team of 1921.

Argentina hosted and won the first South American Championship in 1995 and still play in the tournament today, though they now send an "A" team. They also participated in the first ICC Americas Championship in 2000, finishing 5th. MCC visited again in March 2001, winning both matches.

Argentina hosted the Americas Championship in 2002, finishing sixth. MCC toured again in 2004, drawing the series 1–1. Later that year, Argentina finished 5th in the Americas Championship.

In 2006, the Americas Championship was split into two divisions and Argentina were placed in Division Two. They won the Division Two tournament and were promoted to Division One in Canada that August, where they finished 5th.

In 2008 they finished 5th with only one victory coming against newcomers Suriname. The inclusion of coach Hamish Barton in the team proved successfully specially when he scored 99 not out against Canada. Argentina ended being beaten in a nail-biting finish by 1 wicket.

=== World Cricket League ===
This originally qualified them for Division Five of the World Cricket League, but they were placed in Division Three following the suspension of the USA from international cricket. They finished as runners-up to Uganda in the tournament and qualified for Division Two in Windhoek, Namibia.

Following their promotion, in November 2007, Argentina traveled to Namibia to take part in Division Two of the ICC World Cricket League. They played Denmark, the hosts, Oman and the UAE in addition to the other qualifier from Division Three; Uganda. Division Two proved to be a step too far for Argentina, as they lost all their group matches and then lost to Uganda in a positional playoff and finished sixth. On the basis of their sixth-place finish in this tournament, Argentina were relegated back to Division Three for the 2009 tournament which Argentina hosted from 24 to 31 January 2009. However, Argentina again struggled, losing all five of their games to finish bottom of the table and were relegated to the Division Four. In Division 4 their downfall continued and lost all the games thus relegated to Division Five. Then again in Division 5 they lost all the matches and have now been relegated to Division Six. Argentina have lost considerable form over time and with present ways they may go down the WCL structure.

In 2013, Argentina took part in Division Six of the World Cricket League and came fourth. In normal circumstances it meant they will play Div 6 in 2015 but ICC is going for a change of structure of World Cricket League and Argentina might go out of the WCL Structure unless they fight back which looks tough.

=== 2018–present ===
In April 2018, the ICC decided to grant full Twenty20 International (T20I) status to all its members. Therefore, all Twenty20 matches played between Argentina and other ICC members after 1 January 2019 have the full T20I status.

Argentina played their first T20I match against Mexico on 3 October 2019 during the 2019 South American Cricket Championship in Peru

3 October 2019
08:30
Scorecard

| Mexico; 46/8 (12 overs) | v | Argentina; 47/1 (6.3 overs) |
| Tarun Sharma 22 (21); Hernán Fennell 2/3 (1 over) | | Hernán Fennell 25* (17); Luis Hermida 1/17 (2 overs) |

Argentina won by 9 wickets
El Cortijo Polo Club Pitch 1, Lima
Umpires: Oscar Andrade (Ber) and Sandeep Harnal (Can)

- Argentina won the toss and elected to field.
- The match was reduced to 12 overs per side.
- First ever T20I match for Argentina.

In October 2019, Argentina won 2019 South American Cricket Championship after defeating Mexico by four wickets in the final

== Tournament history ==
=== ICC Trophy/Cricket World Cup Qualifier ===
Cricket World Cup Qualifier records
| Year | Round | Position | GP | W | L | T | NR |
|---|---|---|---|---|---|---|---|
| (England) 1979 | Group stage | 14/15 | 4 | 0 | 3 | 0 | 1 |
| (England) 1982 | Did not participate | | | | | | |
| (England) 1986 | Group stage | 15/16 | 6 | 0 | 6 | 0 | 0 |
| (Netherlands) 1990 | Plate round | 15/17 | 8 | 1 | 7 | 0 | 0 |
| (Kenya) 1994 | Plate round | 18/20 | 7 | 2 | 5 | 0 | 0 |
| (Malaysia) 1997 | Plate round | 20/22 | 7 | 1 | 6 | 0 | 0 |
| (Canada) 2001 | Division Two | 15/24 | 5 | 4 | 1 | 0 | 0 |
| 2005—2027 | Did not qualify | | | | | | |
| Total | 6/13 | 0 Titles | 37 | 8 | 28 | 0 | 1 |

=== T20 World Cup Americas Regional Final ===
ICC T20 World Cup Americas Regional Final (Note: Regional Final of the ICC Americas region is the final stage of qualification for T20 World Cup from 2023 edition.) records
| Year | Round | Position | GP | W | L | T | NR |
|---|---|---|---|---|---|---|---|
| (Bermuda) 2019 | Did not qualify | | | | | | |
| (Antigua and Barbuda) 2021 | Round-robin | 4/7 | 6 | 2 | 4 | 0 | 0 |
| (Bermuda) 2023 | Did not qualify | | | | | | |
| (Canada) 2025 | Did not qualify | | | | | | |
| Total | 1/4 | 0 Titles | 6 | 2 | 4 | 0 | 0 |

- A - Advanced to global qualifier
- Q - Qualified for T20 World Cup

=== South American Championship ===
- The team was represented by Represented by Argentina 'A' team from 2000 to 2018.

South American Cricket Championship records
| Year | Round | Position | GP | W | L | T | NR |
|---|---|---|---|---|---|---|---|
| (Argentina) 1995 | Champions | 1/4 | 3 | 3 | 0 | 0 | 0 |
| (Argentina) 1997 | Champions | 1/4 | 3 | 3 | 0 | 0 | 0 |
| (Peru) 1999 | Champions | 1/6 | 3 | 3 | 0 | 0 | 0 |
| (Argentina) 2000 | Champions | 1/7 | 4 | 4 | 0 | 0 | 0 |
| (Argentina) 2002 | Champions | 1/4 | 4 | 3 | 1 | 0 | 0 |
| (Chile) 2004 | 3rd place | 3/8 | 4 | 3 | 1 | 0 | 0 |
| (Peru) 2007 | Runners-up | 2/6 | 3 | 2 | 1 | 0 | 0 |
| (Brazil) 2009 | Champions | 1/4 | 3 | 2 | 1 | 0 | 0 |
| (Chile) 2011 | Runners-up | Records not available | | | | | |
| (Argentina) 2013 | Champions | Records not available | | | | | |
| (Peru) 2014 | 5th place | Records not available | | | | | |
| (Chile) 2015 | Champions | 1/6 | 6 | 5 | 1 | 0 | 0 |
| (Brazil) 2016 | Runners-up | 2/6 | 5 | 4 | 1 | 0 | 0 |
| (Argentina) 2017 | Champions | 1/7 | 6 | 6 | 0 | 0 | 0 |
| (Colombia) 2018 | Round robin | 7/8 | 7 | 2 | 5 | 0 | 0 |
| (Peru) 2019 | Champions | 1/7 | 7 | 6 | 1 | 0 | 0 |
| (Brazil) 2022 | Champions | 1/7 | 7 | 6 | 1 | 0 | 0 |
| (Argentina) 2023 | Champions | 1/8 | 5 | 5 | 0 | 0 | 0 |
| (Brazil) 2024 | Round robin | 3/8 | 3 | 2 | 1 | 0 | 0 |
| Total | 18/18 | – | 30 | 21 | 8 | 0 | 0 |

=== Other tournaments ===
| T20WC Americas Sub-regional Qualifiers | World Cricket League | ICC Americas Championship |
|---|---|---|
| 2018: 3rd place; 2023: 4th place; 2024: 4th place | 2007 (Division three): Runners-up — promoted; 2007 (Division two): 6th place — relegated; 2009 (Division three): 6th place — relegated; 2010 (Division four): 6th place — relegated; 2012 (Division five): 6th place — relegated; 2013 (Division six): 4th place — relegated; 2013 (Division six): 4th place — relegated | 2000: 5th place; 2002: 6th place; 2002: 6th place; 2006 (Division two): Winners — promoted; 2006 (Division one): 5th place; 2008 (Division one): 5th place; 2009-10 (Division one): 4th place; 2011 (Division one): 6th place; 2013 (Division two): 4th place |

== Current squad ==
Updated as on 6 December 2024

This lists all the active players who played for Argentina in the recently concluded 2024 Men's T20 World Cup Americas Sub-regional Qualifier.

| Name | Age | Batting style | Bowling style | Last T20I | Note(s) |
Batters
| Bruno Angeletti | 39 | Right-handed | Right-arm off break | (Brazil) 2024 | |
| Augusto Mustafa | 34 | Right-handed | —N/a | (Brazil) 2024 | |
All-rounders
| Guido Angeletti | 23 | Right-handed | Right-arm medium | (Brazil) 2024 | |
| Alan Kirschbaum | 24 | Right-handed | Right-arm off break | (Brazil) 2024 | |
| Agustin Rivero | 22 | Right-handed | Right-arm medium | (Brazil) 2024 | |
| Lucas Rossi | 21 | Right-handed | Leg break | (Brazil) 2024 | |
| Tomas Rossi | 25 | Right-handed | Right-arm medium-fast | (Cayman Islands) 2024 | |
Wicket-keeper
| Pedro Baron | 25 | Right-handed | —N/a | (Brazil) 2024 | Captain |
| Alejandro Ferguson | 48 | Right-handed | —N/a | (Brazil) 2024 | |
| Manuel Iturbe | 22 | Right-handed | —N/a | (Cayman Islands) 2024 | |
| Santiago Iturbe | 24 | Right-handed | —N/a | (Brazil) 2024 | |
Pace bowlers
| Hernán Fennell | 38 | Right-handed | Right-arm medium | (Brazil) 2024 | Vice-captain |
| Santiago Duggan | 30 | Right-handed | Right-arm medium | (Brazil) 2024 | |
Spin bowlers
| Agustin Husain | 34 | Right-handed | Right-arm off break | (Mexico) 2024 | |

== Coaching staff ==
| Position | Name |
|---|---|
| Head coach | Gary Grewal |
| Assistant Coach | Ishwar Mahraj |
| Fitness & Conditioning | Matías Paredes |
| Team Manager | Pablo Ferguson |

== International grounds ==
Locations of all stadiums which have hosted an international cricket match within Argentina

| Ground | City | Province | Capacity | Matches hosted | Notes |
|---|---|---|---|---|---|
| Belgrano Athletic Club | Buenos Aires | Autonomous City of Buenos Aires | 2,000 | T20Is, other internationals | One of the oldest cricket venues in Argentina |
| Hurlingham Club | Hurlingham | Province of Buenos Aires | 2,500 | T20Is, ICC events | Traditional ground with British heritage |
| Buenos Aires Cricket & Rugby Club | San Fernando | Province of Buenos Aires | 3,000 | T20Is | Multi-sport club, also used for rugby and football |

== Records & Statistics ==
International Match Summary — Argentina

Last updated 15 March 2026

Playing Record
| Format | M | W | L | T | NR | Inaugural Match |
| Twenty20 Internationals | 38 | 22 | 14 | 0 | 2 | 3 October 2019 |

=== Twenty20 International ===
- Highest team total: 171/4 v. Belize on 10 November 2021 at Sir Vivian Richards Stadium, Antigua.
- Highest individual score: 86*, Alejandro Ferguson v. Belize on 10 November 2021 at Sir Vivian Richards Stadium, Antigua.
- Best individual bowling figures: 6/18, Hernán Fennell v. Panama on 10 November 2021 at Sir Vivian Richards Stadium, Antigua.

Most T20I runs for Argentina

| Player | Runs | Average | Career span |
|---|---|---|---|
| Pedro Baron | 947 | 29.59 | 2019–2026 |
| Alejandro Ferguson | 577 | 27.47 | 2019–2026 |
| Alan Kirschbaum | 434 | 17.36 | 2021–2026 |
| Ramiro Escobar | 364 | 24.26 | 2019–2026 |
| Tomas Rossi | 271 | 15.94 | 2021–2026 |

Most T20I wickets for Argentina

| Player | Wickets | Average | Career span |
|---|---|---|---|
| Hernán Fennell | 59 | 12.64 | 2019–2026 |
| Alan Kirschbaum | 33 | 18.78 | 2021–2026 |
| Agustin Rivero | 28 | 15.32 | 2023–2026 |
| Lucas Rossi | 26 | 11.07 | 2023–2026 |
| Tomas Rossi | 22 | 21.00 | 2021–2026 |

T20I record versus other nations

Records complete to T20I #3775. Last updated 15 March 2026.

| Opponent | M | W | L | T | NR | First match | First win |
|---|---|---|---|---|---|---|---|
vs Associate Members
| Bahamas | 3 | 1 | 2 | 0 | 0 | 8 November 2021 | 2 March 2023 |
| Belize | 2 | 2 | 0 | 0 | 0 | 10 November 2021 | 10 November 2021 |
| Bermuda | 5 | 0 | 5 | 0 | 0 | 14 November 2021 | |
| Brazil | 6 | 4 | 0 | 0 | 2 | 4 October 2019 | 4 October 2019 |
| Canada | 1 | 0 | 1 | 0 | 0 | 13 November 2021 | |
| Cayman Islands | 4 | 0 | 4 | 0 | 0 | 4 March 2023 | |
| Chile | 2 | 2 | 0 | 0 | 0 | 5 October 2019 | 5 October 2019 |
| Mexico | 7 | 7 | 0 | 0 | 0 | 3 October 2019 | 3 October 2019 |
| Panama | 3 | 2 | 1 | 0 | 0 | 10 November 2021 | 10 November 2021 |
| Peru | 1 | 1 | 0 | 0 | 0 | 4 October 2019 | 4 October 2019 |
| Suriname | 3 | 3 | 0 | 0 | 0 | 11 December 2024 | 11 December 2024 |
| United States | 1 | 0 | 1 | 0 | 0 | 11 November 2021 | |

== Other records ==
Performances by Argentina cricketers in World Cricket League matches since 2007

Current players
| Name | Matches | Runs | Wickets |
|---|---|---|---|
| Martin Siri | 22 | 502 | 3 |
| Bernardo Irigoyen | 9 | 149 | 0 |
| Pablo Ferguson | 34 | 409 | 0 |
| Lucas Paterlini | 27 | 427 | 31 |
| Gary Savage | 33 | 371 | 36 |
| Alejandro Ferguson | 30 | 458 | 0 |
| Matias Paterlini | 34 | 536 | 13 |
| Esteban MacDermott | 36 | 283 | 29 |
| Hernán Williams | 13 | 122 | 0 |
| Augustin Casime | 14 | 35 | 8 |
| Facundo Duggan | 3 | 23 | 0 |
| Lautaro Musiani | 4 | 10 | 2 |
| Pedro Bruno | 6 | 17 | 0 |
| Hernán Fennell | 12 | 15 | 11 |

Former players
| Name | Matches | Runs | Wickets |
|---|---|---|---|
| Pablo Ryan | 14 | 51 | 15 |
| Grant Dugmore | 14 | 227 | 2 |
| Alejo Tissera | 5 | 66 | 4 |
| David Mauro | 2 | 8 | 0 |
| Tomas Francis | 8 | 73 | 0 |
| Carlos Gibson | 5 | 73 | 0 |
| Donald Forrester | 22 | 353 | 2 |
| Diego Lord | 24 | 120 | 32 |
| Hamish Barton | 6 | 62 | 4 |
| Esteban Nino | 13 | 4 | 14 |

Performances by Argentina cricketers in World Cricket League matches since 2007

=== Highest Scores ===
- Matias Paterlini – 114* vs Namibia at United Cricket Club, Windhoek on 25 November 2007
- Martin Siri – 78 vs Jersey at Grainville, St Saviour on 25 July 2013
- Donald Forrester – 71 vs Uganda at Trans Namib Ground, Windhoek on 1 December 2007
- Lucas Paterlini – 70 vs Cayman Islands at Belgrano ACG, Buenos Aires on 28 January 2009
- Alejandro Ferguson – 66* vs Oman at Trans Namib Ground, Windhoek on 24 November 2007

Best bowling figures

- Esteban Nino – 4/16 vs Fiji at Kahlin Oval, Darwin on 30 May 2007
- Esteban MacDermott – 4/20 vs Cayman Islands at Gardens Oval, Darwin on 31 May 2007
- Esteban MacDermott – 4/22 vs PNG at Gardens Oval, Darwin on 28 May 2007
- Diego Lord – 4/34 vs PNG at St Albans Club, Buenos Aires on 25 January 2009
- Lucas Paterlini – 4/45 vs Kuwait at Farmers Cricket Club Ground, St Martin on 24 July 2013

== See also ==
- List of Argentina Twenty20 International cricketers
- Argentina national women's cricket team
- South American Cricket Championship
