= List of Cayman Islands first-class cricketers =

The Cayman Islands cricket team played two first-class matches in the 2005 Intercontinental Cup, with 13 players representing the Cayman Islands in these matches. An Intercontinental Cup match is a first-class international cricket match between two representative teams, each having first-class status, as determined by the International Cricket Council (ICC). A first-class match is played over three or four days, with each team having a maximum of two innings.

The Cayman Islands joined became an affiliate member of the ICC in 1997, later in 2002, they became an associate member. The Cayman Islands first officially played in 2000, when the team faced the United States in the Americas Championship. The Cayman Islands were invited to compete in the 2005 Intercontinental Cup, playing two matches in the tournament against Bermuda and Canada, with both played at the Toronto Cricket, Skating and Curling Club. The Cayman Islands lost both these matches by heavy margins, thus eliminating from the competition. The Cayman Islands were not invited back to play in the next edition of the competition and are yet to play first-class cricket since. Cayman Island cricket has declined somewhat from the level at which it found itself in 2005 and now plays in World Cricket League Division Five.

Only four players didn't play in both first-class matches: Keneil Irving, Kenute Tulloch, Marc Chin and Abali Hoilett. Pearson Best scored more runs than any other Caymanian with 121. The highest score by a Caymanian was Steve Gordon's 65 against Bermuda. Both Gordon and Best are the only Caymanians to make half centuries. Ryan Bovell has claimed more wickets in first-class matches than any other Caymanian, having taken 7. He also captained the team in both its first-class matches.

This list includes all players who have played at least one first-class match and is initially arranged in the order of debut appearance. Where more than one player won their first caps in the same match, those players are initially listed alphabetically at the time of debut.

== Key ==
General

- ‡ – Captain
- † – Wicket-keeper
- First – Year of debut
- Last – Year of latest game
- Mat – Number of matches played
- Win% – Winning percentage

Batting

- Inn – Number of innings batted
- NO – Number of innings not out
- Runs – Runs scored in career
- HS – Highest score
- 100 – Centuries scored
- 50 – Half-centuries scored
- Avg – Runs scored per dismissal
- * – Batsman remained not out

Bowling

- Balls – Balls bowled in career
- Wkt – Wickets taken in career
- BBI – Best bowling in an innings
- Ave – Average runs per wicket
- Eco – Average runs conceded per over

Fielding

- Ca – Catches taken
- St – Stumpings taken

== First-class cricketers ==
| No. | Name | First | Last | Mat | Inn | NO | Runs | HS | 100 | 50 | Avg | Balls | Wkt | BBI | Ave | Eco | Ca | St |
| No. | Name | First | Last | Mat | Batting | | | | | | | Bowling | | | | | Fielding | |
|---|---|---|---|---|---|---|---|---|---|---|---|---|---|---|---|---|---|---|
| 1 | Steve Gordon | 2005 | 2005 | 2 | 4 | 0 | 96 | 65 | 0 | 1 | 24.00 | 0 | – | – | – | – | 0 | 0 |
| 2 | Ainsley Hall | 2005 | 2005 | 2 | 4 | 0 | 51 | 30 | 0 | 0 | 12.75 | 0 | – | – | – | – | 1 | 0 |
| 3 | Keneil Irving | 2005 | 2005 | 1 | 2 | 0 | 18 | 18 | 0 | 0 | 9.00 | 0 | – | – | – | – | 1 | 0 |
| 4 | Pearson Best | 2005 | 2005 | 2 | 4 | 0 | 121 | 53 | 0 | 1 | 30.25 | 81 | – | – | – | 5.18 | 2 | 0 |
| 5 | Franklyn Hinds | 2005 | 2005 | 2 | 4 | 0 | 83 | 35 | 0 | 0 | 20.75 | 150 | 3 | 2/18 | 25.00 | 3.00 | 1 | 0 |
| 6 | Jalon Linton | 2005 | 2005 | 2 | 4 | 0 | 24 | 9 | 0 | 0 | 8.00 | 0 | – | – | – | – | 2 | 0 |
| 7 | Ryan Bovell ‡ | 2005 | 2005 | 2 | 4 | 1 | 97 | 44 | 0 | 0 | 32.33 | 255 | 7 | 3/62 | 17.85 | 2.94 | 1 | 0 |
| 8 | Ronald Ebanks | 2005 | 2005 | 2 | 4 | 0 | 40 | 26 | 0 | 0 | 10.00 | 246 | 2 | 1/61 | 87.00 | 4.24 | 1 | 0 |
| 9 | Ryan Ebanks † | 2005 | 2005 | 2 | 4 | 1 | 46 | 23 | 0 | 0 | 15.33 | 0 | – | – | – | – | 2 | 0 |
| 10 | Kenute Tulloch | 2005 | 2005 | 1 | 2 | 0 | 2 | 2 | 0 | 0 | 1.00 | 102 | – | – | – | 5.76 | 0 | 0 |
| 11 | Troy Taylor | 2005 | 2005 | 2 | 4 | 1 | 0 | 0* | 0 | 0 | 0.00 | 245 | 6 | 4/60 | 26.33 | 3.86 | 0 | 0 |
| 12 | Marc Chin | 2005 | 2005 | 1 | 2 | 0 | 14 | 14 | 0 | 0 | 7.00 | 180 | 3 | 2/104 | 46.66 | 4.66 | 2 | 0 |
| 13 | Abali Hoilett | 2005 | 2005 | 1 | 2 | 0 | 16 | 16 | 0 | 0 | 8.00 | 0 | – | – | – | – | 1 | 0 |
