= 2009 ICC World Cricket League Division Three =

- Administrator: International Cricket Council
- Cricket format: Limited-overs cricket
- Tournament format: Round-robin
- Host: Argentina
- Champions: Afghanistan
- Participants: 6
- Matches: 15 (The Play-off matches where cancelled due to rain)
- Most runs: Roger Mukasa
- Most wickets: Kenneth Kamyuka
- Official website: ICC World Cricket League

The 2009 ICC World Cricket League Division Three was a cricket tournament that took place in Buenos Aires, Argentina, from 24 to 31 January 2009. It formed part of the ICC World Cricket League and qualifying for the 2011 Cricket World Cup.

Afghanistan won the tournament, with Uganda coming in second. Both teams qualified for the 2011 World Cup qualification tournament. Afghanistan and Uganda each won four matches and lost one, as did Papua New Guinea; the rankings tie was broken by net run rate.

Papua New Guinea were the first to reach four wins, as Afghanistan and Uganda both had their fifth matches abandoned due to rain and had to replay them the next day. The rain also resulted in the cancellation of the finals round ranking matches (which would not affect promotion or relegation in any case), and the group round result table was the final standings.

== Teams ==
The six teams for the tournament had been decided according to the results of Division Two and Division Three in 2007, and Division Four in 2008, and were as follows:

- Uganda (5th from 2007 Division Two)
- Argentina (6th from 2007 Division Two)
- Papua New Guinea (3rd from 2007 Division Three)
- Cayman Islands (4th from 2007 Division Three)
- Afghanistan (1st from 2008 Division Four)
- Hong Kong (2nd from 2008 Division Four)

The top two teams from this tournament qualified to play in the 2009 ICC World Cup Qualifier in South Africa.

== Squads ==
Afghanistan	Argentina	Cayman Islands	Hong Kong	Papua New Guinea	Uganda
Nowroz Mangal (c); Ahmed Shah; Asadullah Khan; Asghar Afghan; Hameed Hasan; Hasti Gul; Karim Sadiq (wk); Khaliq Dad; Mirwais Naziri; Mohammad Nabi; Raees Ahmadzai; Samiullah Shenwari; Shafiqullah Shafiq	Esteban MacDermott (c); Alejandro Ferguson (wk); Hamish Barton; Agustin Casime; Pablo Ferguson; Donald Forrester; Diego Lord; David Mauro; Esteban Nino; Lucas Paterlini; Matias Paterlini; Pablo Ryan; Gary Savage; Martin Siri	Pearson Best (c); Kevon Bazil; Kevin Bazil; Ryan Bovell; Kervin Ebanks; Steve Gordon; Ainsley Hall (wk); Keneil Irving; Saheed Mohamed; Alessandro Morris; Ricardo Roach; Ramon Sealy; Kenute Tulloch	Tabarak Dar (c); James Atkinson (wk); Manoj Cheruparambil; Hussain Butt; Ilyas Gull; Irfan Ahmed; Courtney Kruger; Roy Lamsam; Munir Dar; Nadeem Ahmed; Najeeb Amar; Skhawat Ali; Zain Abbas	Rarua Dikana (c); John Ovia (vc); Assad Vala; Daniel Alu; Chris Amini; Ipi Morea (wk); Jacob Mado; Jamie Brazier; John Haoda; Kila Pala; Loa Nou; Mahuru Dai; Vani Vagi Morea; Willie Gavera; Peter Moide	Davis Arinaitwe; Akbar Baig; Kenneth Kamyuka; Junior Kwebiha; Arthur Kyobe; Roger Mukasa; Benjamin Musoke; Emmanuel Nakaana; Frank Nsubuga; Joel Olwenyi; Danniel Ruyange; Ronald Ssemanda; Charles Waiswa

== Group stage ==
=== Points table ===
Pos	Team	Pld	W	L	T	NR	Pts	NRR	Qualification or relegation
1	Afghanistan	5	4	1	0	0	8	0.971	Team qualifies for 2009 World Cup Qualifier
2	Uganda	5	4	1	0	0	8	0.772	Team qualifies for 2009 World Cup Qualifier
3	Papua New Guinea	5	4	1	0	0	8	0.665	Team remains in 2011 Division Three
4	Hong Kong	5	2	3	0	0	4	−0.005	Team remains in 2011 Division Three
5	Cayman Islands	5	1	4	0	0	2	−1.384	Team is relegated to 2010 Division Four
6	Argentina	5	0	5	0	0	0	−1.036	Team is relegated to 2010 Division Four

=== Matches ===
24 January
(scorecard)

Uganda; 216/8 (50 overs)	v	Afghanistan; 202 (49.3 overs)
Frank Nsubuga 62 (44); Samiullah Shenwari 3/32 (8 overs)		Raees Ahmadzai 78 (100); Kenneth Kamyuka 5/36 (9.3 overs)

Uganda won by 14 runs
St Albans Club, Buenos Aires
Umpires: Ashook Brijcoomar (CAN) & Tony Hill (NZL)
Player of the match: Kenneth Kamyuka

24 January
(scorecard)

Cayman Islands; 121 (37 overs)	v	Papua New Guinea; 122/4 (20.5 overs)
Ainsley Hall 30 (76); Rarva Dikana 5/14 (8 overs)		Vani Morea 64 (51); Ryan Bovell 4/35 (7.5 overs)

Papua New Guinea by 6 wickets
Belgrano Athletic Club Ground, Buenos Aires
Umpires: Karran Bayney (CAN) & Hubert Smythe (CAY)
Player of the match: Vani Morea

24 January
(scorecard)

Argentina; 107 (48.5 overs)	v	Hong Kong; 109/3 (27.2 overs)
Gary Savage 26* (73); Nadeem Ahmed 3/25 (9.5 overs)		Zain Abbas 34* (79); Pablo Ryan 2/30 (8 overs)

Hong Kong by 7 wickets
Hurlingham Club Ground, Buenos Aires
Umpires: Steven Douglas (BER) & Peter Hartley (ENG)
Player of the match: James Atkinson

25 January
(scorecard)

Afghanistan; 201 (49.5 overs)	v	Hong Kong; 188 (48.2 overs)
Mohammad Nabi 40 (44); Roy Lamsam 3/33 (10 overs)		Munir Dar 49 (38); Hasti Gul 2/31 (10 overs)

Afghanistan by 13 runs
Buenos Aires
Umpires: Ashook Brijcoomar (CAN) & Courtney Young (CAY)
Player of the match: Mohammad Nabi

25 January
(scorecard)

Papua New Guinea; 127 (33.5 overs)	v	Argentina; 106 (44.4 overs)
Vani Morea 39 (35); Diego Lord 4/34 (10 overs)		Gary Savage 21 (45); Rarva Dikana 5/5 (8.4 overs)

Papua New Guinea by 21 runs
Buenos Aires
Umpires: Karran Bayney (CAN) & Peter Hartley (ENG)
Player of the match: Rarva Dikana

25 January
(scorecard)

Cayman Islands; 104 (49.1 overs)	v	Uganda; 105/1 (22.1 overs)
Saheed Mohamed 30 (80); Kenneth Kamyuka 3/10 (10 overs)		Roger Mukasa 81* (75); Ryan Bovell 1/17 (6 overs)

Uganda by 9 wickets
Buenos Aires
Umpires: Tony Hill (NZL) & Hubert Smythe (CAY)
Player of the match: Roger Mukasa

27 January
(scorecard)

Afghanistan; 164 (47.4 overs)	v	Argentina; 145 (46.4 overs)
Ahmed Shah 43 (93); Hamish Barton 3/12 (10 overs)		Lucas Paterlini 35 (55); Ahmed Shah 2/21 (10 overs)

Afghanistan by 19 runs
Buenos Aires
Umpires: Peter Hartley (ENG) & Courtney Young (CAY)

27 January
(scorecard)

Hong Kong; 210 (46.3 overs)	v	Cayman Islands; 161 (48 overs)
Manoj Cheruparambil 85 (123); Ryan Bovell 3/48 (8.3 overs)		Ainsley Hall 23 (43); Zain Abbas 4/28 (9 overs)

Hong Kong by 49 runs
Buenos Aires
Umpires: Ashook Brijcoomar (CAN) & Hubert Smythe (CAY)
Player of the match: Manoj Cheruparambil

27 January
(scorecard)

Papua New Guinea; 165 (49.5 overs)	v	Uganda; 139 (44.2 overs)
Peter Moide 43* (83); Kenneth Kamyuka 3/21 (8.5 overs)		Kenneth Kamyuka 34* (54); Jamie Brazier 4/16 (10 overs)

Papua New Guinea by 26 runs
Buenos Aires
Umpires: Steven Douglas (BER) & Tony Hill (NZL)
Player of the match: Jamie Brazier

28 January
(scorecard)

Papua New Guinea; 93 (31 overs)	v	Afghanistan; 94/2 (15.4 overs)
Jamie Brazier 22 (18); Hameed Hasan 3/26 (7 overs)		Karim Sadiq 50* (43); Jamie Brazier 1/38 (5 overs)

Afghanistan won by 8 wickets
Buenos Aires
Umpires: Karran Bayney (CAN) & Tony Hill (NZL)
Player of the match: Karim Sadiq

28 January
(scorecard)

Argentina; 165 (47.2 overs)	v	Cayman Islands; 166/4 (39.1 overs)
Lucas Paterlini 70 (50); Alessandro Morris 3/17 (10 overs)		Ramon Sealy 66* (118); Lucas Paterlini 2/41 (9.1 overs)

Cayman Islands won by 6 wickets
Buenos Aires
Umpires: Peter Hartley (ENG) & Hubert Smythe (CAY)
Player of the match: Ramon Sealy

28 January
(scorecard)

Uganda; 180 (50 overs)	v	Hong Kong; 179 (49.4 overs)
Roger Mukasa 67 (82); Munir Dar 4/30 (10 overs)		Hussain Butt 52 (108); Kenneth Kamyuka 4/21 (10 overs)

Uganda won by 1 run
Buenos Aires
Umpires: Steven Douglas (BER) & Courtney Young (CAY)
Player of the match: Kenneth Kamyuka

30 January
Scorecard

Afghanistan; 68/5 (31 overs)	v	Cayman Islands; 35/2 (7 overs)
Nowroz Mangal 26* (73); Saheed Mohamed 2/10 (7 overs)		Keneil Irving 18* (16); Dawlat Ahmadzai 2/8 (4 overs)

No result
Buenos Aires
Umpires: Peter Hartley (ENG) & Courtney Young (CAY)

- Match abandoned due to rain. Match replayed on 31 January

30 January
Scorecard

Uganda; 69/4 (30 overs)	v	Argentina; 0/0 (0 overs)
Roger Mukasa 17 (26); Lucas Paterlini 2/23 (7 overs)

No result
Buenos Aires
Umpires: Karran Bayney & Ashook Brijcoomar

- Match abandoned due to rain. Match replayed on 31 January

30 January
(scorecard)

Hong Kong; 91 (42.3 overs)	v	Papua New Guinea; 90/1 (12.3 overs)
Ilyas Gull 25 (61 balls); Loa Nou 3/14 (7.3 overs)		Vani Morea 42* (31 balls); Najeeb Amar 1/19 (3 overs)

Papua New Guinea won by 9 wickets (D/L method)
Buenos Aires
Umpires: Steven Douglas (BER) & Tony Hill (NZL)

31 January
Scorecard

Afghanistan; 230/8 (50 overs)	v	Cayman Islands; 148 (45 overs)
Nowroz Mangal 70 (89 balls); Ryan Bovell 3/55 (10 overs)		Ryan Bovell 29 (37 balls); Mohammad Nabi 4/23 (9 overs)

Afghanistan won by 82 runs
Buenos Aires
Umpires: Peter Hartley (ENG) & Courtney Young (CAY)

31 January
Scorecard

Uganda; 183 (47.4 overs)	v	Argentina; 83 (33.2 overs)
AS Kyobe 41 (48 balls); Lucas Paterlini 3/37 (8.4 overs)		MJ Paterlini 26 (64 balls); Kenneth Kamyuka 3/26 (9.2 overs)

Uganda won by 100 runs
Buenos Aires
Umpires: Karran Bayney & Ashook Brijcoomar
Player of the match: Kenneth Kamyuka

== Final and Playoffs ==
The playoff matches were cancelled after the abandonment of fifth-round group matches led to replays on the day the playoff matches were scheduled.

== See also ==
- ICC World Cricket League
