= 2008 ICC Americas Championship Division One =

- Administrator: Americas Cricket Association
- Cricket format: 50 overs per side
- Tournament format: round robin
- Host: United States
- Champions: United States (2nd title)
- Participants: 6
- Matches: 15
- Player of the series: (United States) Sushil Nadkarni
- Most runs: (United States) Sushil Nadkarni 407
- Most wickets: (United States) Imran Awan 9 (Argentina) Diego Lord 9

The 2008 ICC Americas Championship Division One was a cricket tournament in the United States, taking place between 25 and 30 November 2010. It gave six North and South American Associate and Affiliate members of the International Cricket Council experience of international one-day cricket.

The United States won the championship after an undefeated campaign.

== Teams ==
There were 6 teams that played in the tournament. These teams were non-test member nations of the Americas Cricket Association. The teams that played were:

- Argentina
- Bermuda
- Canada
- Cayman Islands
- Suriname
- United States

== Squads ==
Argentina	Bermuda	Canada
Hamish Barton Augustin Casime; Alejandro Ferguson; Pablo Ferguson; Donald Forrester; Tomas Francis; Diego Lord; Esteban MacDermott; David Mauro; Estaban Nino; Lucas Paterlini; Pablo Ryan; Gary Savage; Martin Siri	Oronde Bascome; Glenn Blakeney; Lionel Cann; Chris Douglas; Jekon Edness; David Hemp; Stefan Kelly; Dwayne Leverock; Steven Outerbridge; Joslyn Pitcher; Irving Romaine; Rodney Trott; Tamauri Tucker	Harvir Baidwan Umar Bhatti (Captain); Khurram Chohan; Sunil Dhaniram; Karun Jethi; Sandeep Jyoti; Eion Katchay; Asif Mulla; Henry Osinde; Qaiser Ali; Zubin Surkari

Cayman Islands	Suriname	United States
Kevin Bazil Pearson Best; Ryan Bovell; Marlon Bryan; Kevin Ebanks; Steve Gordon; Ainsley Hall; Ricardo Roach; Ramon Sealy; Troy Taylor; Omar Willis	Sherad Bakas Mounir Bhoelan; Zahir Doekhie; Charles Douglas; Arun Gokoel; Kemraj Hardat; Tariq Islam; Dion Mohabir; Sanjay Oemraw; Mohamed Sardha; Deoraj Sewanan	Timroy Allen Imran Awan; Orlando Baker; Sudesh Dhaniram; Nasir Javed; Rashard Marshall; Steve Massiah; Shahid Munir; Sushil Nadkarni; Aditya Thyagarajan; Carl Wright

== Group stage ==
=== Points table ===
Pos	Team	Pld	W	L	T	NR	Pts	NRR
1	United States	5	5	0	0	0	20	2.822
2	Bermuda	5	3	1	0	1	14	1.785
3	Canada	5	3	1	0	1	14	1.714
4	Cayman Islands	5	2	3	0	0	8	−0.719
5	Argentina	5	1	4	0	0	4	−1.253
6	Suriname	5	0	5	0	0	0	−3.698

Team relegated to 2010 Division Two

=== Results ===
25 November 2008
(scorecard)

Argentina; 191/7 (50 overs)	v	Canada; 194/9 (48 overs)
Hamish Barton 99* (144); Karun Jethi 2/36 (9 overs)		Ashif Mulla 55 (66); Diego Lord 3/31 (10 overs)

Canada by 1 wicket
Brian Piccolo Park, Cooper City
Umpires: (Bermuda) Steven Douglas & (Cayman Islands) Hubert Smythe
Player of the match: (Argentina) Hamish Barton

25 November 2008
(scorecard)

Bermuda; 220/7 (50 overs)	v	Cayman Islands; 147/9 (50 overs)
David Hemp 51* (59); Alessandro Morris 2/30 (10 overs)		Pearson Best 29 (60); Chris Douglas 4/18 (8 overs)

Bermuda by 73 runs
LCS Turf Ground, Fort Lauderdale
Umpires: (Canada) Karran Bayney & (Canada) Ashook Brijcoomar
Player of the match: (Bermuda) Chris Douglas

25 November 2008
(scorecard)

United States; 365/5 (50 overs)	v	Suriname; 60 (20 overs)
Sushil Nadkarni 197 (192); Sanjay Oemraw 2/86 (10 overs)		Deoraj Sewanan 17 (46); Timroy Allen 5/7 (5 overs)

United States by 305 runs
LCS Artificial Ground, Fort Lauderdale
Umpires: (Bermuda) Roger Dill & (Cayman Islands) Courtney Young
Player of the match: (United States) Sushil Nadkarni

26 November 2008
(scorecard)

Bermuda; 290/3 (50 overs)	v	Suriname; 66 (34.1 overs)
Lionel Cann 101 (97); Giovani Gokoel 2/40 (10 overs)		Mohamed Sardha 13 (16); Delyone Borden 6/17 (10 overs)

Bermuda by 224 runs
LCS Turf Ground, Fort Lauderdale
Umpires: (Canada) Karran Bayney & (Cayman Islands) Hubert Smythe
Player of the match: (Bermuda) Delyone Borden

26 November 2008
(scorecard)

Canada; 298/9 (50 overs)	v	Cayman Islands; 92 (33.2 overs)
Sandeep Jyoti 88 (129); Alessandro Morris 3/68 (10 overs)		Steve Gordon 24 (68); Zahid Hussain 3/11 (4.2 overs)

Canada by 206 runs
LCS Artificial Ground, Fort Lauderdale
Umpires: (Bermuda) Roger Dill & (Bermuda) Steven Douglas
Player of the match: (Canada) Zubin Surkari

26 November 2008
(scorecard)

Argentina; 200/8 (50 overs)	v	United States; 203/3 (37.5 overs)
Hamish Barton 74 (118); Imran Awan 2/16 (7 overs)		Sushil Nadkarni 109* (106); Diego Lord 1/19 (7 overs)

United States by 7 wickets
Brian Piccolo Park, Cooper City
Umpires: (Canada) Ashook Brijcoomar & (Cayman Islands) Courtney Young
Player of the match: (United States) Sushil Nadkarni

27 November 2008
(scorecard)

Cayman Islands; 230 (46.5 overs)	v	Argentina; 122 (46.1 overs)
Pearson Best 109 (107); Gary Savage 4/16 (8.5 overs)		Lucas Paterlini 32 (64); Kevin Bazil 5/13 (8.1 overs)

Cayman Islands by 108 runs
LCS Turf Ground, Fort Lauderdale
Umpires: (Bermuda) Roger Dill & (Bermuda) Steven Douglas
Player of the match: (Cayman Islands) Pearson Best

27 November 2008
(scorecard)

Canada; 269/9 (50 overs)	v	Suriname; 63 (23.5 overs)
Ashif Mulla 100 (127); Deoraj Sewanan 3/19 (4 overs)		Mohamed Bhoelan 26 (44); Umar Bhatti 6/15 (9 overs)

Canada by 206 runs
LCS Artificial Ground, Fort Lauderdale
Umpires: (Cayman Islands) Hubert Smythe & (Cayman Islands) Courtney Young
Player of the match: (Canada) Umar Bhatti

27 November 2008
(scorecard)

United States; 254/7 (50 overs)	v	Bermuda; 168/9 (50 overs)
Rashard Marshall 71 (59); Justin Pitcher 3/45 (9 overs)		Lionel Cann 78 (94); Imran Awan 3/16 (8 overs)

United States by 86 runs
Brian Piccolo Park, Cooper City
Umpires: (Canada) Karran Bayney & (Canada) Ashook Brijcoomar
Player of the match: (United States) Rashard Marshall

29 November 2008
(scorecard)

Bermuda; 341/4 (50 overs)	v	Argentina; 195/6 (50 overs)
Glenn Blakeney 118 (113); Diego Lord 2/38 (8 overs)		Tomas Francis 50 (105); Stefan Kelly 2/27 (10 overs)

Bermuda by 146 runs
LCS Artificial Ground, Fort Lauderdale
Umpires: (Canada) Karran Bayney & (Cayman Islands) Hubert Smythe
Player of the match: (Bermuda) Glenn Blakeney

29 November 2008
(scorecard)

Suriname; 103 (46 overs)	v	Cayman Islands; 105/2 (21 overs)
Kemraj Hardat 31 (48); Michael Wight 5/7 (6 overs)		Ryan Bovell 40 (40); Mohamed Bhoelan 1/10 (2 overs)

Cayman Islands by 8 wickets
Brian Piccolo Park, Cooper City
Umpires: (Canada) Ashook Brijcoomar & (Bermuda) Steven Douglas
Player of the match: (Cayman Islands) Michael Wight

29 November 2008
(scorecard)

United States; 201/8 (50 overs)	v	Canada; 120 (44.5 overs)
Aditya Thyagarajan 84* (99); Harvir Baidwan 3/38 (9 overs)		Sandeep Jyoti 40 (83); Orlando Baker 5/31 (10 overs)

United States by 81 runs
LCS Turf Ground, Fort Lauderdale
Umpires: (Bermuda) Roger Dill & (Cayman Islands) Courtney Young
Player of the match: (United States) Orlando Baker

30 November 2008
(scorecard)

Suriname; 190 (49 overs)	v	Argentina; 191/4 (45.5 overs)
Charles Douglas 53 (74); Diego Lord 3/26 (10 overs)		Hamish Barton 68 (88); Giovani Gokoel 2/39 (10 overs)

Argentina by 6 wickets
LCS Artificial Ground, Fort Lauderdale
Umpires: (Canada) Ashook Brijcoomar & (Bermuda) Steven Douglas
Player of the match: (Suriname) Charles Douglas

30 November 2008
(scorecard)

Canada; 190/6 (42 overs)	v	Bermuda; 53/1 (9.2 overs)
Sandeep Jyoti 48 (65); Rodney Trott 2/23 (6 overs)		Lionel Cann 40 (23); Qaiser Ali 1/6 (1.2 overs)

No Result
LCS Turf Ground, Fort Lauderdale
Umpires: (Bermuda) Steven Douglas & (Cayman Islands) Courtney Young

- Match reduced to 42 overs a side.
  Rain stopped play at 53/1 off 9.2 overs

30 November 2008
(scorecard)

United States; 289/6 (49 overs)	v	Cayman Islands; 65/4 (23.1 overs)
Carl Wright 112 (105); Kevon Bazil 4/55 (10 overs)		Michael Wight 24 (41); Aditya Thyagarajan 2/19 (7.1 overs)

United States by 87 runs (D/L)
Brian Piccolo Park, Cooper City
Umpires: (Bermuda) Roger Dill & (Canada) Karran Bayney
Player of the match: (United States) Carl Wright

- Rain stopped play (2nd Innings) 24/1 off 8 overs, 4 overs lost
  Rain stopped play, 52/4 off 18 overs, 9 overs lost
