= 2024 Men's T20 World Cup Americas Sub-regional Qualifier =

Qualifying tournament for the 2026 T20WC in Americas region

2024 ICC Men's T20 World Cup Americas Sub-regional Qualifier
- Dates: 6 – 16 December 2024
- Administrator: ICC Americas
- Cricket format: Twenty20 International
- Tournament format: Round-robin tournament
- Host: Argentina
- Champions: Bermuda
- Runners-up: Cayman Islands
- Participants: 9
- Matches: 36
- Most runs: (Cayman Islands) Sacha de Alwis (324)
- Most wickets: (Argentina) Hernán Fennell (17)

The 2024 ICC Men's T20 World Cup Americas Sub-regional Qualifier was a cricket tournament that formed part of the qualification process for the 2026 Men's T20 World Cup. It was hosted by Argentina in December 2024.

The top three sides in the tournament advanced to the regional final, where they will be joined by Canada, who were given a bye after having participated in the previous T20 World Cup.

== Squads ==
Argentina	Bahamas	Belize	Bermuda	Brazil
Pedro Baron (c); Hernán Fennell (vc); Bruno Angeletti; Guido Angeletti; Santiago Duggan; Alejandro Ferguson; Agustin Husain; Manuel Iturbe; Santiago Iturbe (wk); Alan Kirschbaum; Augusto Mustafa; Agustin Rivero; Lucas Rossi; Tomas Rossi	Marc Taylor (c); Festus Benn; Renford Davson; Eugene Duff; Rudolph Fox; Javelle Gallimore; Sandeep Goud; Antonio Harris; Kervon Hinds; Julio Jemison; Ashok Nair; Romaine Smith; Gregory Taylor; Dwight Weakley; Dwight Wheatley	Jermaine Pook (c); Garret Banner; Glenford Banner; Nathan Banner; Lawrence Bonner; Brian Casasola; Ordell Casasola; Maurice Castillo; Russhane Jones; Brandon Lewis; Alexander Oxley; Jaron Pakeman; Bernan Stephenson; Clint Stephenson (wk); Kristan Tillett; Javonn Wade (wk)	Terryn Fray (c, wk); Onias Bascome; Derrick Brangman; Zeko Burgess; Alex Dore; Kevon Fubler; Tre Manders; Jermal Proctor; Jarryd Richardson (wk); Dominic Sabir; Chare Smith; Jonté Smith; Sinclair Smith (wk); Dion Stovell	Greigor Caisley (c); Yasar Haroon (vc); Michel Assuncao; Richard Avery; Kawsar Khan; Chrystian Machado (wk); Lucas Maximo; William Maximo; Luis Morais; Luiz Muller; Gabriel Oliveira; Victor Poubel; Iuri Simao; Muhammad Saleem

Cayman Islands	Mexico	Panama	Suriname
Conroy Wright (c); Ramon Sealy (vc); Jermaine Baker (wk); Sacha de Alwis; Romeo Dunka; Ronald Ebanks; Sam Foster; Alistair Ifill; Demar Johnson; Alessandro Morris; Akshay Naidoo; Troy Taylor; Rickel Walker; Adrian Wright	Shantanu Kaveri (c); Shashikant Laxman (vc); Revanakumar Ankad; Puneet Arora; Luis Hermida; Yashvanth Jasti; Pradeep Mohanarangam; Kashigoud Patil; Rohit Poojary (wk); Shoaib Rafiq; Praveen Santhanakrishnan; Pratik Singh Bais; Rupesh Singh; Dhruv Vinod	Anilkumar Ahir (c, wk); Yusuf Ebrahim (vc); Breeze Ahir; Dilip Ahir; Khandubhai Ahir (wk); Parth Ahir; Rahul Ahir; Sanjay Ahir; Sohel Desai (wk); Irfan Hafejee; Mahmud Jasat; Yusuf Kachhalia; Ahmed Patel; Parth Patel	Arun Gokoel (c); Abdul Bhikhari; Yuvraj Dayal; Troy Dudnath; Giovani Gokoel; Kemraj Hardat; Vejai Hirlall; Khemraj Jaikaran; Taarkheswar Ramautar; Romario Ramjiawan; Vishwar Shaw; Gavin Singh; Xaviee Smith; Vishaul Singh

== Pre-tournament matches ==
Argentina, Bermuda and Mexico played warm-up fixtures ahead of the tournament. The match between Argentina and Bermuda was played with T20I status.

2 December 2024
10:00
Scorecard

Bermuda; 154/6 (20 overs)	v	Argentina; 112/8 (20 overs)
Onias Bascome 49 (31); Franz Bur 1/16 (2 overs)		Alejandro Ferguson 30 (44); Jonté Smith 4/20 (4 overs)

Bermuda won by 42 runs
Hurlingham Club Ground, Buenos Aires
Umpires: Aditya Gajjar (USA) and Vijaya Mallela (USA)
Player of the match: Jonté Smith (Ber)

- Argentina won the toss and elected to field.
- Franz Bur, Steven Kruger (Arg), Alex Dore, Chare Smith and Jonté Smith (Ber) all made their T20I debuts.

2 December 2024
14:30
Scorecard

Argentina; 120/7 (20 overs)	v	Mexico/Bermuda XI; 111/8 (20 overs)
Pedro Baron 41 (31); Dhruv Vinod 2/15 (3 overs)		Praveen Santhanakrishnan 26 (31); Steven Kruger 2/13 (4 overs)

Argentina won by 9 runs
Hurlingham Club Ground, Buenos Aires
Umpires: Aditya Gajjar (USA) and Vijaya Mallela (USA)
Player of the match: Steven Kruger (Arg)

- Argentina won the toss and elected to bat.

3 December 2024
10:00
Scorecard

Bermuda; 161/7 (20 overs)	v	Mexico/Bermuda XI; 116/9 (20 overs)
Alex Dore 38 (41); Yashvanth Jasti 2/24 (3.3 overs)		Dominic Sabir 52 (36); Jermal Proctor 2/20 (3 overs)

Bermuda won by 45 runs
Club San Albano, Burzaco
Umpires: Aditya Gajjar (USA) and Vijaya Mallela (USA)
Player of the match: Jermal Proctor (Ber)

- Bermuda won the toss and elected to bat.

== Points table ==
Qualifier standings
Pos	Team	Pld	W	L	NR	Pts	NRR	Qualification
1	Bermuda	8	7	0	1	15	3.601	Advanced to the regional final
2	Cayman Islands	8	6	2	0	12	2.089	Advanced to the regional final
3	Bahamas	8	6	2	0	12	0.258	Advanced to the regional final
4	Argentina (H)	8	5	2	1	11	0.266	Eliminated
5	Belize	8	3	5	0	6	−0.551	Eliminated
6	Mexico	8	2	6	0	4	−0.326	Eliminated
7	Panama	8	2	6	0	4	−1.304	Eliminated
8	Suriname	8	2	6	0	4	−1.309	Eliminated
9	Brazil	8	2	6	0	4	−2.213	Eliminated

Source: ESPNcricinfo
(H) Host

== Fixtures ==
=== Day one ===
6 December 2024
10:30
Scorecard

Argentina	v	Bermuda

Match abandoned
St. George's College, Quilmes
Umpires: Jermaine Lindo (USA) and Arnold Maddela (Can)

- No toss.
- No play was possible due to a wet outfield.

6 December 2024
10:30
Scorecard

Panama; 93/6 (15 overs)	v	Suriname; 83/8 (15 overs)
Irfan Hafejee 35* (32); Arun Gokoel 3/14 (3 overs)		Gavin Singh 39* (38); Dilip Ahir 2/9 (3 overs)

Panama won by 10 runs
Club San Albano, Burzaco
Umpires: Candace la Borde (WI) and Harry Grewal (Can)
Player of the match: Irfan Hafejee (Pan)

- Panama won the toss and elected to bat.
- The match was reduced to 15 overs per side due to rain.
- Breeze Ahir, Parth Ahir, Sanjay Ahir, Sohel Desai, Yusuf Kachhalia (Pan), Abdul Bhikari, Yuvraj Dayal, Troy Dudnath, Arun Gokoel, Vejai Hirlal, Khemraj Jaikaran, Taarkheswar Ramautar, Vishwar Shaw, Vishaul Singh, Gavin Singh and Xaviee Smith (Sur) all made their T20I debuts.

6 December 2024
14:30
Scorecard

Bahamas; 89/4 (16 overs)	v	Brazil; 63/9 (16 overs)
Rudolph Fox 24* (23); Iuri Simao 2/18 (3 overs)		William Maximo 13 (25); Kervon Hinds 3/13 (4 overs)

Bahamas won by 26 runs
St. George's College, Quilmes
Umpires: Maria Abbott (WI) and Aditya Gajjar (USA)
Player of the match: Marc Taylor (Bah)

- Bahamas won the toss and elected to bat.
- The match was reduced to 16 overs per side due to rain.
- Eugene Duff and Dwight Weakley (Bah) both made their T20I debuts.

6 December 2024
14:30
Scorecard

Mexico; 112/6 (20 overs)	v	Belize; 113/5 (19.4 overs)
Shantanu Kaveri 28 (41); Bernan Stephenson 2/18 (3 overs)		Maurice Castillo 41* (35); Pratik Singh Bais 2/11 (4 overs)

Belize won by 5 wickets
Club San Albano, Burzaco
Umpires: Vijay Mallela (USA) and Rohan Shah (Can)
Player of the match: Maurice Castillo (Blz)

- Mexico won the toss and elected to bat.
- Russhane Jones, Brandon Lewis, Alexander Oxley, Jaron Pakeman, Jermaine Pook, Clint Stephenson (Blz), Yashvanth Jasti, Pradeep Mohanarangam, Kashigoud Patil and Rohit Poojary (Mex) all made their T20I debuts.

=== Day two ===
7 December 2024
10:30
Scorecard

Mexico; 102 (20 overs)	v	Brazil; 55 (14.4 overs)
Luis Hermida 32 (35); Richard Avery 4/20 (4 overs)		Luis Morais 18* (20); Shoaib Rafiq 5/12 (4 overs)

Mexico won by 47 runs
Hurlingham Club Ground, Buenos Aires
Umpires: Maria Abbott (WI) and Jermaine Lindo (USA)
Player of the match: Shoaib Rafiq (Mex)

- Mexico won the toss and elected to bat.
- Rupesh Singh (Mex) made his T20I debut.
- Shoaib Rafiq (Mex) took his first five-wicket haul in T20Is.

7 December 2024
10:30
Scorecard

Argentina; 101 (19.3 overs)	v	Belize; 96 (19.1 overs)
Hernán Fennell 19 (14); Nathan Banner 3/12 (4 overs)		Alexander Oxley 31 (44); Alan Kirschbaum 3/16 (4 overs)

Argentina won by 5 runs
St. George's College, Quilmes
Umpires: Candace la Borde (WI) and Rohan Shah (Can)
Player of the match: Hernán Fennell (Arg)

- Belize won the toss and elected to field.
- Lawrence Bonner and Ordell Casasola (Blz) both made their T20I debuts.

7 December 2024
14:30
Scorecard

Bermuda; 161/7 (20 overs)	v	Suriname; 69/9 (20 overs)
Tre Manders 44 (33); Xaviee Smith 2/22 (4 overs)		Yuvraj Dayal 22 (28); Kevon Fubler 3/4 (4 overs)

Bermuda won by 92 runs
Hurlingham Club Ground, Buenos Aires
Umpires: Aditya Gajjar (USA) and Arnold Maddela (Can)
Player of the match: Kevon Fubler (Ber)

- Bermuda won the toss and elected to bat.
- Kevon Fubler, Jermal Proctor (Ber) and Kemraj Hardat (Sur) all made their T20I debuts.

7 December 2024
14:30
Scorecard

Cayman Islands; 124/6 (20 overs)	v	Panama; 41 (15 overs)
Akshay Naidoo 39 (42); Irfan Hafejee 2/35 (4 overs)		Breeze Ahir 21 (35); Adrian Wright 3/9 (3 overs)

Cayman Islands won by 83 runs
St. George's College, Quilmes
Umpires: Harry Grewal (Can) and Vijaya Mallela (USA)
Player of the match: Adrian Wright (Cay)

- Cayman Islands won the toss and elected to bat.
- Jermaine Baker, Sam Foster and Rickel Walker (Cay) all made their T20I debuts.

=== Day three ===
8 December 2024
10:30
Scorecard

Panama; 60/7 (20 overs)	v	Bermuda; 61/1 (4.4 overs)
Anilkumar Ahir 27 (49); Kevon Fubler 2/15 (4 overs)		Terryn Fray 37* (15); Ahmed Patel 1/14 (2 overs)

Bermuda won by 9 wickets
Club San Albano, Burzaco
Umpires: Maria Abbott (WI) and Arnold Maddela (Can)
Player of the match: Terryn Fray (Ber)

- Panama won the toss and elected to bat.
- Khandubhai Ahir (Pan) made his T20I debut.

8 December 2024
10:30
Scorecard

Bahamas; 119/8 (20 overs)	v	Argentina; 101/5 (20 overs)
Marc Taylor 41 (28); Agustin Rivero 3/18 (4 overs)		Alan Kirschbaum 30* (28); Festus Benn 3/9 (4 overs)

Bahamas won by 18 runs
Hurlingham Club Ground, Buenos Aires
Umpires: Candace la Borde (WI) and Vijaya Mallela (USA)
Player of the match: Festus Benn (Bah)

- Bahamas won the toss and elected to bat.

8 December 2024
14:30
Scorecard

Suriname; 101/8 (20 overs)	v	Brazil; 102/4 (19 overs)
Gavin Singh 25* (27); Gabriel Oliveira 2/12 (2 overs)		Luis Morais 32* (46); Gavin Singh 1/9 (4 overs)

Brazil won by 6 wickets
Club San Albano, Burzaco
Umpires: Aditya Gajjar (USA) and Jermaine Lindo (USA)
Player of the match: Luis Morais (Bra)

- Suriname won the toss and elected to bat.
- Giovani Gokoel and Romario Ramjiawan (Sur) both made their T20I debuts.

8 December 2024
14:30
Scorecard

Cayman Islands; 151/9 (20 overs)	v	Belize; 107/9 (20 overs)
Romeo Dunka 35 (23); Bernan Stephenson 3/16 (4 overs)		Maurice Castillo 30 (20); Adrian Wright 3/18 (4 overs)

Cayman Islands won by 44 runs
Hurlingham Club Ground, Buenos Aires
Umpires: Harry Grewal (Can) and Rohan Shah (Can)
Player of the match: Romeo Dunka (Cay)

- Cayman Islands won the toss and elected to bat.

=== Day four ===
10 December 2024
10:30
Scorecard

Cayman Islands; 142/8 (20 overs)	v	Suriname; 143/4 (19 overs)
Akshay Naidoo 35 (35); Arun Gokoel 3/15 (4 overs)		Xaviee Smith 57* (29); Ronald Ebanks 2/29 (4 overs)

Suriname won by 6 wickets
Hurlingham Club Ground, Buenos Aires
Umpires: Aditya Gajjar (USA) and Harry Grewal (Can)
Player of the match: Xaviee Smith (Sur)

- Suriname won the toss and elected to field.
- Ronald Ebanks (Cay) made his T20I debut.

10 December 2024
10:30
Scorecard

Bahamas; 117/5 (20 overs)	v	Belize; 114/6 (20 overs)
Kervon Hinds 53 (42); Nathan Banner 3/14 (4 overs)		Bernan Stephenson 36* (25); Festus Benn 2/13 (4 overs)

Bahamas won by 3 runs
Club San Albano, Burzaco
Umpires: Candace la Borde (WI) and Jermaine Lindo (USA)
Player of the match: Kervon Hinds (Bah)

- Belize won the toss and elected to field.
- Romaine Smith (Bah) and Kristan Tillett (Blz) both made their T20I debuts.

10 December 2024
14:30
Scorecard

Mexico; 96/9 (20 overs)	v	Bermuda; 97/4 (12.3 overs)
Pradeep Mohanarangam 26 (40); Kevon Fubler 2/10 (4 overs)		Onias Bascome 37 (20); Yashvanth Jasti 2/19 (3 overs)

Bermuda won by 6 wickets
Hurlingham Club Ground, Buenos Aires
Umpires: Maria Abbott (WI) and Vijaya Mallela (USA)
Player of the match: Onias Bascome (Ber)

- Mexico won the toss and elected to bat.

10 December 2024
14:30
Scorecard

Panama; 92 (19.1 overs)	v	Argentina; 95/4 (17.2 overs)
Irfan Hafejee 19 (24); Hernán Fennell 2/11 (3.1 overs)		Alan Kirschbaum 35* (31); Rahul Ahir 2/11 (3 overs)

Argentina won by 6 wickets
Club San Albano, Burzaco
Umpires: Arnold Maddela (Can) and Rohan Shah (Can)
Player of the match: Alan Kirschbaum (Arg)

- Panama won the toss and elected to bat.

=== Day five ===
11 December 2024
10:30
Scorecard

Mexico; 85 (20 overs)	v	Cayman Islands; 86/3 (16.4 overs)
Kashigoud Patil 24 (42); Ronald Ebanks 3/16 (4 overs)		Sacha de Alwis 50* (50); Pradeep Mohanarangam 1/13 (4 overs)

Cayman Island won by 7 wickets
St. George's College, Quilmes
Umpires: Candace la Borde (WI) and Arnold Maddela (Can)
Player of the match: Sacha de Alwis (Cay)

- Mexico won the toss and elected to bat.

11 December 2024
10:30
Scorecard

Bahamas; 109 (20 overs)	v	Panama; 88 (19.1 overs)
Renford Davson 30 (21); Irfan Hafejee 3/23 (4 overs)		Irfan Hafejee 27 (16); Festus Benn 3/16 (3.1 overs)

Bahamas won by 21 runs
Hurlingham Club Ground, Buenos Aires
Umpires: Maria Abbott (WI) and Aditya Gajjar (USA)
Player of the match: Festus Benn (Bah)

- Bahamas won the toss and elected to bat.
- Ashok Nair (Bah) made his T20I debut.

11 December 2024
14:30
Scorecard

Bermuda; 149/4 (20 overs)	v	Brazil; 62 (17.3 overs)
Tre Manders 52 (45); Iuri Simao 2/24 (4 overs)		Luiz Muller 16 (20); Dominic Sabir 3/16 (3 overs)

Bermuda won by 87 runs
St. George's College, Quilmes
Umpires: Jermaine Lindo (USA) and Rohan Shah (Can)
Player of the match: Dominic Sabir (Ber)

- Brazil won the toss and elected to field.

11 December 2024
14:30
Scorecard

Suriname; 123/8 (20 overs)	v	Argentina; 124/4 (16.3 overs)
Vishaul Singh 30 (33); Alan Kirschbaum 3/30 (4 overs)		Pedro Baron 60 (37); Vishwar Shaw 1/4 (2 overs)

Argentina won by 6 wickets
Hurlingham Club Ground, Buenos Aires
Umpires: Harry Grewal (Can) and Vijay Mallela (USA)
Player of the match: Pedro Baron (Arg)

- Suriname won the toss and elected to bat.

=== Day six ===
12 December 2024
10:30
Scorecard

Panama; 122/9 (20 overs)	v	Brazil; 123/4 (18.4 overs)
Irfan Hafejee 33 (38); Yasar Haroon 5/16 (4 overs)		Luiz Muller 57* (39); Irfan Hafejee 1/30 (3.4 overs)

Brazil won by 6 wickets
Estadio Belgrano Athletic, Buenos Aires
Umpires: Arnold Maddela (Can) and Rohan Shah (Can)
Player of the match: Yasar Haroon (Bra)

- Panama won the toss and elected to bat.
- Lucas Maximo (Bra) made his T20I debut.
- Yasar Haroon (Bra) took his first five-wicket haul in T20Is.

12 December 2024
10:30
Scorecard

Suriname; 48 (17.4 overs)	v	Mexico; 52/2 (9.1 overs)
Vejai Hirlal 10 (16); Pradeep Mohanarangam 4/15 (4 overs)		Shashikant Laxman 20 (6); Arun Gokoel 1/15 (4 overs)

Mexico won by 8 wickets
St. George's College, Quilmes
Umpires: Maria Abbott (WI) and Harry Grewal (Can)
Player of the match: Pradeep Mohanarangam (Mex)

- Mexico won the toss and elected to field.

12 December 2024
14:30
Scorecard

Bahamas; 108/5 (20 overs)	v	Cayman Islands; 109/0 (17.1 overs)
Festus Benn 37* (44); Conroy Wright 2/13 (4 overs)		Jermaine Baker 55* (61)

Cayman Islands won by 10 wickets
Estadio Belgrano Athletic, Buenos Aires
Umpires: Candace la Borde (WI) and Jermaine Lindo (USA)
Player of the match: Jermaine Baker (Cay)

- Bahamas won the toss and elected to bat.
- Javelle Gallimore (Bah) made his T20I debut.

12 December 2024
14:30
Scorecard

Bermuda; 123/9 (20 overs)	v	Belize; 52 (14.2 overs)
Tre Manders 34 (31); Lawrence Bonner 3/24 (4 overs)		Bernan Stephenson 11 (8); Kevon Fubler 3/12 (3.2 overs)

Bermuda won by 71 runs
St. George's College, Quilmes
Umpires: Aditya Gajjar (USA) and Vijaya Mallela (USA)
Player of the match: Dion Stovell (Ber)

- Belize won the toss and elected to field.

=== Day seven ===
14 December 2024
10:30
Scorecard

Cayman Islands; 224/1 (20 overs)	v	Brazil; 65 (13.2 overs)
Sacha de Alwis 150* (67); Luis Morais 1/36 (4 overs)		Luiz Muller 29 (18); Alessandro Morris 4/7 (4 overs)

Cayman Islands won by 159 runs
Club San Albano, Burzaco
Umpires: Harry Grewal (Can) and Arnold Maddela (Can)
Player of the match: Sacha de Alwis (Cay)

- Cayman Islands won the toss and elected to bat.
- Sacha de Alwis (Cay) became the first player for Cayman Islands to score a century in men's T20Is.

14 December 2024
10:30
Scorecard

Bahamas; 97 (19.2 overs)	v	Suriname; 71 (17.3 overs)
Eugene Duff 31 (39); Khemraj Jaikaran 3/22 (4 overs)		Xaviee Smith 20 (11); Festus Benn 2/10 (2.3 overs)

Bahamas won by 26 runs
Estadio Belgrano Athletic, Buenos Aires
Umpires: Jermaine Lindo (USA) and Vijay Mallela (USA)
Player of the match: Kervon Hinds (Bah)

- Bahamas won the toss and elected to bat.

14 December 2024
14:30
Scorecard

Panama; 103 (19.3 overs)	v	Belize; 104/3 (13.5 overs)
Anilkumar Ahir 26 (28); Maurice Castillo 6/16 (4 overs)		Lawrence Bonner 70* (42); Rahul Ahir 2/18 (3 overs)

Belize won by 7 wickets
Club San Albano, Burzaco
Umpires: Candace la Borde (WI) and Maria Abbott (WI)
Player of the match: Lawrence Bonner (Blz)

- Panama won the toss and elected to bat.
- Maurice Castillo (Blz) took his first five-wicket haul in T20Is.

14 December 2024
14:30
Scorecard

Argentina; 121/8 (20 overs)	v	Mexico; 98 (19.5 overs)
Alejandro Ferguson 34* (35); Shoaib Rafiq 3/18 (4 overs)		Pradeep Mohanarangam 27 (21); Hernán Fennell 3/14 (3.5 overs)

Argentina won by 23 runs
Estadio Belgrano Athletic, Buenos Aires
Umpires: Aditya Gajjar (USA) and Rohan Shah (Can)
Player of the match: Hernán Fennell (Arg)

- Mexico won the toss and elected to field.

=== Day eight ===
15 December 2024
10:30
Scorecard

Brazil; 120 (19.5 overs)	v	Belize; 121/4 (16 overs)
Luiz Muller 45 (30); Lawrence Bonner 5/10 (3.5 overs)		Glenford Banner 34 (19); Luiz Muller 1/8 (1 over)

Belize won by 6 wickets
Estadio Belgrano Athletic, Buenos Aires
Umpires: Candace la Borde (WI) and Harry Grewal (Can)
Player of the match: Lawrence Bonner (Blz)

- Brazil won the toss and elected to bat.
- Lawrence Bonner (Blz) took his first five-wicket haul in T20Is.

15 December 2024
10:30
Scorecard

Cayman Islands; 116 (20 overs)	v	Argentina; 94 (16.5 overs)
Sam Foster 41 (46); Hernán Fennell 5/14 (4 overs)		Pedro Baron 35 (30); Conroy Wright 3/13 (3.5 overs)

Cayman Islands won by 22 runs
Hurlingham Club Ground, Buenos Aires
Umpires: Jermaine Lindo (USA) and Rohan Shah (Can)
Player of the match: Conroy Wright (Cay)

- Argentina won the toss and elected to field.
- Hernán Fennell (Arg) became the sixth bowler to take four wickets in four balls in a men's T20I.

15 December 2024
14:30
Scorecard

Bermuda; 179/4 (20 overs)	v	Bahamas; 117/9 (20 overs)
Tre Manders 82 (52); Romaine Smith 1/19 (4 overs)		Renford Davson 40 (45); Derrick Brangman 3/25 (4 overs)

Bermuda won by 62 runs
Estadio Belgrano Athletic, Buenos Aires
Umpires: Maria Abbott (WI) and Arnold Maddela (Can)
Player of the match: Tre Manders (Ber)

- Bermuda won the toss and elected to bat.

15 December 2024
14:30
Scorecard

Panama; 111/9 (20 overs)	v	Mexico; 63 (14.4 overs)
Mahmud Jasat 28 (24); Revanakumar Ankad 3/18 (4 overs)		Luis Hermida 26 (32); Dilip Ahir 3/11 (3 overs)

Panama won by 48 runs
Hurlingham Club Ground, Buenos Aires
Umpires: Aditya Gajjar (USA) and Vijaya Mallela (USA)
Player of the match: Mahmud Jasat (Pan)

- Mexico won the toss and elected to field.

=== Day nine ===
16 December 2024
10:30
Scorecard

Bermuda; 139/6 (20 overs)	v	Cayman Islands; 126/9 (20 overs)
Onias Bascome 42 (35); Alistair Ifill 2/20 (4 overs)		Akshay Naidoo 33 (37); Zeko Burgess 3/20 (4 overs)

Bermuda won by 13 runs
Club San Albano, Burzaco
Umpires: Arnold Maddela (Can) and Vijaya Mallela (USA)
Player of the match: Zeko Burgess (Ber)

- Bermuda won the toss and elected to bat.

16 December 2024
10:30
Scorecard

Bahamas; 95/9 (20 overs)	v	Mexico; 71 (18.2 overs)
Kervon Hinds 48 (33); Pradeep Mohanarangam 3/6 (4 overs)		Shantanu Kaveri 24 (36); Festus Benn 3/11 (4 overs)

Bahamas won by 24 runs
St. George's College, Quilmes
Umpires: Harry Grewal (Can) and Jermaine Lindo (USA)
Player of the match: Kervon Hinds (Bah)

- Bahamas won the toss and elected to bat.

16 December 2024
14:30
Scorecard

Belize; 98 (17.1 overs)	v	Suriname; 99/6 (16 overs)
Lawrence Bonner 21 (20); Xaviee Smith 3/13 (4 overs)		Kemraj Hardat 26 (23); Nathan Banner 2/20 (4 overs)

Suriname won by 4 wickets
Club San Albano, Burzaco
Umpires: Maria Abbott (WI) and Rohan Shah (Can)
Player of the match: Kemraj Hardat (Sur)

- Belize won the toss and elected to bat.

16 December 2024
14:30
Scorecard

Argentina; 107/7 (20 overs)	v	Brazil; 96 (19.1 overs)
Agustin Rivero 31 (42); Luis Morais 3/16 (4 overs)		Michel Assuncao 29 (26); Hernán Fennell 3/12 (3.1 overs)

Argentina won by 11 runs
St. George's College, Quilmes
Umpires: Candace la Borde (WI) and Aditya Gajjar (USA)
Player of the match: Agustin Rivero (Arg)

- Brazil won the toss and elected to field.
