= World Cricket League Division Three =

WCL Division Three
- Administrator: ICC
- Format: 50 overs
- First edition: 2007
- Tournament format: Round robin, playoffs
- Number of teams: 8 (2007); 6 (2009–2018)
- Current champion: Oman
- Most successful: Nepal; Oman (2 titles)

ICC World Cricket League Division Three forms part of the World Cricket League (WCL) system. Like all other divisions, WCL Division Three is contested as a standalone tournament rather than as an actual league.

The inaugural Division Three tournament was held in 2007, and featured eight teams. All subsequent editions have featured six teams. Because the WCL operates on a system of promotion and relegation, teams have generally only participated in one or two Division Three tournaments before either being promoted to Division Two or relegated to Division Four. Overall, 18 teams have featured in a Division Three tournament. Uganda has qualified for the division on six out of the seven occasions it has been held, while the United States has qualified on five occasions.

== Results ==
Year	Host(s)	Venue(s)	Final		
Year	Host(s)	Venue(s)	Winner	Result	Runner-up
2007	Australia	Darwin	Uganda; 241/8 (50 overs)	Uganda won by 91 runs scorecard	Argentina; 150 (46.3 overs)
2009	Argentina	Buenos Aires	Afghanistan +0.971 NRR	Afghanistan won on net run rate table	Uganda +0.768 NRR
2011	Hong Kong	Hong Kong	Hong Kong; 207/6 (47.1 overs)	Hong Kong won by 4 wickets scorecard	Papua New Guinea; 202/9 (50 overs)
2013	Bermuda	various	Nepal; 153/5 (39.2 overs)	Nepal won by 5 wickets scorecard	Uganda; 151/8 (50 overs)
2014	Malaysia	Kuala Lumpur	Nepal; 223 (49.5 overs)	Nepal won by 62 runs scorecard	Uganda; 161 (44.1 overs)
2017	Uganda	various	Oman; 50/2 (4.3 overs)	No result Oman won by finishing higher in the group stage scorecard	Canada; 176/3 (38 overs)
2018	Oman	various	OMA	No final Oman finished top of the table	United States

== Performance by team ==
Legend

- 1st – Champions
- 2nd – Runners-up
- 3rd – Third place
- Q – Qualified
- — Hosts
- Sus- Suspended and withdrew

Team	(Australia) 2007	(Argentina) 2009	(Hong Kong) 2011	(Bermuda) 2013	(Malaysia) 2014	(Uganda) 2017	(Oman) 2018	Total
Afghanistan	—	1st	—	—	—	—	—	1
Argentina	2nd	6th	—	—	—	—	—	2
Bermuda	—	—	—	4th	6th	—	—	2
Canada	—	—	—	—	—	2nd	—	1
Cayman Islands	4th	5th	—	—	—	—	—	2
Denmark	—	—	5th	—	—	—	5th	2
Fiji	8th	—	—	—	—	—	—	1
Hong Kong	5th	4th	1st	—	—	—	—	3
Italy	7th	—	4th	6th	—	—	—	3
Kenya	—	—	—	—	—	—	4th	1
Malaysia	—	—	—	—	3rd	6th	—	2
Nepal	—	—	—	1st	1st	—	—	2
Oman	—	—	3rd	5th	—	1st	1st	4
Papua New Guinea	3rd	3rd	2nd	—	—	—	—	3
Singapore	—	—	—	—	4th	3rd	3rd	3
Tanzania	6th	—	—	—	—	—	—	1
Uganda	1st	2nd	—	2nd	2nd	5th	6th	6
United States	Sus	—	6th	3rd	5th	4th	2nd	5

== Player statistics ==
Year	Most runs	Most wickets	Ref
2007	(Cayman Islands) Steve Gordon (253)	(Argentina) Esteban Macdermott (12)	
2009	(Uganda) Roger Mukasa (203)	(Uganda) Kenneth Kamyuka (18)	
2011	(Italy) Alessandro Bonora (286)	(Papua New Guinea) Rarva Dikana (16)	
2013	(United States) Steven Taylor (274)	(Oman) Munis Ansari (16)	
2014	(Singapore) Arjun Mutreja (282)	(Nepal) Basanta Regmi (14)	
2017	(Canada) Bhavindu Adhihetty (222)	(Oman) Khawar Ali (14)	
2018	(Denmark) Hamid Shah (241)	(Oman) Bilal Khan (12)	
