= Keneil Irving =

Cayman Islands cricketer

Personal information
- Full name: Keneil Donald Irving
- Born: 1 July 1981 (age 45); Saint Elizabeth, Jamaica
- Batting: Right-handed
- Bowling: Right-arm medium
- Role: Wicket-keeper

Career statistics
Competition	First-class	T20
Matches	1	3
Runs scored	18	2
Batting average	9.00	1.00
100s/50s	0/0	0/0
Top score	18	1
Catches/stumpings	1/0	0/0
- Source: CricketArchive, 11 March 2009

Keneil Donald Irving (born 1 July 1981) is a Cayman Islands cricketer. A right-handed batsman, right-arm medium pace bowler and wicket-keeper, he has played for the Cayman Islands national cricket team since 2005.

== Playing career ==
Irving made his debut for the Cayman Islands in the 2005 ICC Intercontinental Cup, playing against Bermuda at the Toronto Cricket, Skating and Curling Club in what is his only first-class match to date. In July the following year, he played twice for the Cayman Islands in the Stanford 20/20 tournament.

The following month, he represented the Cayman Islands in the ICC Americas Championship at the Maple Leaf Cricket Club in King City, Ontario, Canada. He most recently represented them at Division Three of the World Cricket League in Darwin, Australia in May/June 2007.
