= Jalon Linton =

Caymanian cricketer

Personal information
- Born: 11 March 1984 (age 42); Cayman Islands
- Batting: Right-handed
- Role: Batsman

International information
- National side: Cayman Islands
- T20I debut (cap 18): 13 April 2022 v Bahamas
- Last T20I: 16 April 2022 v Bahamas

Career statistics
| Competition | First-class | T20 |
|---|---|---|
| Matches | 2 | 2 |
| Runs scored | 24 | 2 |
| Batting average | 8.00 | 2.00 |
| 100s/50s | 0/0 | 0/0 |
| Top score | 9 | 2 |
| Catches/stumpings | 2/0 | 1/0 |
- Source: CricketArchive, 17 April 2022

Jalon Linton (born 11 March 1984) is a cricketer who has played for the Cayman Islands national cricket team since 2005.

== Career ==
Jalon Linton's first taste of international cricket came in July 2003 when he took part in the Americas Under-19 Championship at the Maple Leaf Cricket Club in King City, Ontario. He played in all four matches as the Cayman Islands finished as runners-up to hosts Canada.

He first played for the senior team in the 2005 ICC Intercontinental Cup, playing first-class matches against Bermuda and Canada at the Toronto Cricket, Skating and Curling Club. The following year, he played in the inaugural Stanford 20/20 tournament, before playing the ICC Americas Championship in King City.

He most recently played for the Cayman Islands in Division Three of the World Cricket League in Darwin, Australia though he only played in one match, the third place play-off against Papua New Guinea.

In April 2022, he was named in the Cayman Islands' Twenty20 International (T20I) squad for their series against the Bahamas. He made his T20I debut on 13 April 2022, for the Cayman Islands against the Bahamas.
