= Franklyn Hinds =

Cayman Islands cricketer

Personal information
- Full name: Franklyn Hinds
- Born: 8 May 1967 (age 59); Cayman Islands
- Batting: Right-handed
- Bowling: Right-arm medium
- Role: All-rounder

Career statistics
Competition	FC	LA	T20
Matches	2	4	2
Runs scored	83	11	2
Batting average	20.75	2.75	1.00
100s/50s	0/0	0/0	0/0
Top score	35	11	2
Balls bowled	150	132	18
Wickets	3	2	1
Bowling average	25.00	38.00	15.00
5 wickets in innings	0	0	0
10 wickets in match	0	0	0
Best bowling	2/18	1/19	1/15
Catches/stumpings	1/0	1/0	0/0
- Source: CricketArchive, 23 September 2007

Franklyn Hinds (born 8 May 1967) is a Cayman Islands cricketer. A right-handed batsman and right-arm medium pace bowler, he has played for the Cayman Islands national cricket team since 2000.

== Career ==
Hinds first played cricket for the Cayman Islands in August 2000, when he played against Bermuda and the USA in the Americas Championship at the Maple Leaf Cricket Club in King City, Ontario. Later that year, he made his List A debut against Guyana in October as part of the Red Stripe Bowl. He played three more matches in the tournament.

After this, he spent some time out of the Cayman Islands side, returning to take part in the 2004 Americas Championship in Bermuda. The following year he played in the repêchage tournament for the 2005 ICC Trophy in Kuala Lumpur in February 2005. Later that year, he made his first-class debut, playing against Bermuda and Canada at the Toronto Cricket, Skating and Curling Club as part of the 2005 ICC Intercontinental Cup.

In 2006, he played against the Bahamas and Trinidad & Tobago in the Stanford 20/20 before playing in the Americas Championship in King City.

He most recently represented the Cayman Islands in Division Three of the World Cricket League in Darwin, Australia, where he was awarded the man of the match award against Hong Kong after taking 4/22 as Hong Kong were bowled out for 67.
