= Kenute Tulloch =

Cayman Islands cricketer (born 1965)

Personal information
- Full name: Kenute Tulloch
- Born: 4 July 1965 (age 61); Jamaica
- Batting: Right-handed
- Bowling: Right-arm medium-fast
- Role: Bowler

Career statistics
| Competition | FC | LA | T20 |
|---|---|---|---|
| Matches | 1 | 4 | 2 |
| Runs scored | 2 | 2 | 1 |
| Batting average | 1.00 | 0.66 | – |
| 100s/50s | 0/0 | 0/0 | 0/0 |
| Top score | 2 | 1 | 1* |
| Balls bowled | 102 | 138 | 36 |
| Wickets | 0 | 4 | 5 |
| Bowling average | – | 25.00 | 7.60 |
| 5 wickets in innings | – | 0 | 1 |
| 10 wickets in match | – | 0 | 0 |
| Best bowling | – | 2/23 | 5/21 |
| Catches/stumpings | 0/– | 0/– | 0/– |
- Source: Cricket Archive, 26 September 2007

Kenute Tulloch (born 4 July 1965) is a Cayman Islands cricketer. A right-handed batsman and right-arm medium-fast bowler, he has played for the Cayman Islands national cricket team since 2000.

== Career ==
Tulloch first played for the Cayman Islands in October 2000, playing against Guyana in the Red Stripe Bowl in Antigua. He next played in the Americas Championship tournaments in Buenos Aires and Bermuda in 2002 and 2004 respectively, before playing in the repêchage tournament for the 2005 ICC Trophy in Kuala Lumpur in February 2005.

In August 2005, he played his only first-class match, against Bermuda at the Toronto Cricket, Skating and Curling Club as part of the 2005 ICC Intercontinental Cup. In 2006, he played for the Cayman Islands in their two matches in the Stanford 20/20 tournament, taking the tournament's first five wicket haul against the Bahamas.

He most recently represented the Cayman Islands in the Division Three tournament of the World Cricket League in Darwin, Australia.
