= Ryan Ebanks =

Cayman Islands cricketer (born 1984)

Personal information
- Full name: Ryan Ebanks
- Born: 10 December 1984 (age 41); Cayman Islands
- Batting: Right-handed
- Role: Wicket-keeper

Domestic team information
- Years: Team
- 2005-present: Cayman Islands
- First-class debut: 27 August 2005 Cayman Islands v Bermuda
- Last First-class: 31 August 2005 Cayman Islands v Canada

Career statistics
Competition	First-class
Matches	2
Runs scored	46
Batting average	15.33
100s/50s	0/0
Top score	23
Balls bowled	0
Wickets	-
Bowling average	-
5 wickets in innings	-
10 wickets in match	-
Best bowling	-
Catches/stumpings	2/0
- Source: , 18 August 2007

Ryan Ebanks (born 10 December 1984 in the Cayman Islands) is a cricketer. A right-handed batsman and wicket-keeper, he has played for the Cayman Islands national cricket team since 2005.

== Biography ==
Ryan Ebanks' first taste of representative cricket came in the Americas Under-19 Championship in King City, Ontario, Canada in July 2003. He played in all four matches in the tournament in which the Cayman Islands finished as runners-up to Canada.

His debut for the senior side came in February 2005 when he played in the repêchage tournament for the 2005 ICC Trophy. The Cayman Islands finished in 5th place in the tournament. In August of that year he played his two first-class matches against Bermuda and Canada at the Toronto Cricket, Skating and Curling Club.

In August 2006, he returned to King City to play in the senior Americas Championship, and most recently played for the Cayman Islands in Division Three of the World Cricket League in Darwin, Australia in May/June 2007.
