= Abali Hoilett =

Bahamian-born Caymanian cricketer

Personal information
- Full name: Abali Hoilett
- Born: 26 April 1983 (age 43); Bahamas
- Batting: Right-handed
- Bowling: Right-arm off break

International information
- National side: Cayman Islands

Career statistics
Competition	First-class
Matches	1
Runs scored	16
Batting average	8.00
100s/50s	–/–
Top score	16
Balls bowled	–
Wickets	–
Bowling average	–
5 wickets in innings	–
10 wickets in match	–
Best bowling	–
Catches/stumpings	1/–
- Source: Cricinfo, 14 December 2011

Abali Hoilett (born 26 April 1983) is a Bahamian born Caymanian cricketer. Hoilett is a right-handed batsman who bowls right-arm off break.

Hoilett made a single first-class appearance for the Cayman Islands against Canada at the Toronto Cricket, Skating and Curling Club in the 2005 Intercontinental Cup. He was dismissed for 16 runs in the Cayman Islands first-innings by Henry Osinde, while in their second-innings he was dismissed for a duck by Sunil Dhaniram. Canada won the match by 120 runs.

He has since played for the team in the 2006 Americas Championship and the 2010 World Cricket League Division Four.
