= Mark Eames =

English-born Hong Kong cricketer

Personal information
- Full name: Mark Ian Neil Eames
- Born: 19 August 1961 (age 65); Coventry, Warwickshire, England
- Batting: Left-handed
- Role: Batsman

International information
- National side: Hong Kong (1988–2007)
- Source: CricketArchive, 10 March 2016

Mark Ian Neil Eames (born 19 August 1961) is a former international cricketer who represented the Hong Kong national side between 1988 and 2007. He played as a left-handed top-order batsman.

Eames was born in Coventry, Warwickshire, and played club cricket in England before relocating to Hong Kong. He made his international debut for Hong Kong at the 1988 South East Asian Tournament, which also featured Bangladesh and Singapore. Over the next few years, Eames made regular appearances for Hong Kong in regional tournaments, including the Tuanku Ja'afar Cup. His first global tournament was the 1994 ICC Trophy in Kenya, where he played in all seven of his team's matches. He had little success, however, scoring only 76 runs from six innings. Eames also had little success at the 1996 ACC Trophy in Malaysia, with his best performance being an innings of 43 runs against Nepal.

At the 1997 ICC Trophy, Eames again played in all of Hong Kong's matches, and was ranked fifth for runs amongst his teammates, scoring 136 runs from eight innings. His highest score, 33, came against Papua New Guinea. For two games at the 2000 ACC Trophy, Eames was moved up the order to open the batting, scoring eleven runs against Malaysia and three runs against the United Arab Emirates (UAE). The following year, he appeared in a third consecutive ICC Trophy, featuring in four matches and scoring 45 from 44 balls against Papua New Guinea (part of a 120-run partnership with Rahul Sharma). In 2004, Eames represented Hong Kong in the ACC Fast Track Countries Tournament, through which the team qualified for the 2005 Intercontinental Cup. Aged 39, he appeared in an Intercontinental Cup fixture against the UAE in April 2005, which held first-class status. His last games for Hong Kong came at the age of 41, in the 2007 World Cricket League Division Three tournament.
