= Mirwais Naziri =

Afghan cricketer

Personal information
- Full name: Mirwais Naziri
- Batting: Right-handed
- Bowling: Right-arm medium

International information
- National side: Afghanistan
- Source: CricketArchive, 17 January 2011

Mirwais Naziri (date of birth unknown) is a right-handed batsman and medium pace bowler who played for the Afghanistan national cricket team.

Naziri was a member of Afghanistan's 2009 ICC World Cricket League Division Three winning squad. Naziri made his debut for Afghanistan in the tournament against Hong Kong Naziri played 4 matches during the tournament, with his final appearance to date for Afghanistan coming against the Cayman Islands.
