= Marc Chin =

Caymanian cricketer (born 1987)

Personal information
- Full name: Marc Chin
- Born: 8 September 1987 (age 39); Cayman Islands
- Batting: Right-handed
- Bowling: Right-arm off break

International information
- National side: Cayman Islands

Career statistics
Competition	First-class
Matches	1
Runs scored	14
Batting average	7.00
100s/50s	–/–
Top score	14
Balls bowled	180
Wickets	3
Bowling average	46.66
5 wickets in innings	–
10 wickets in match	–
Best bowling	2/104
Catches/stumpings	2/–
- Source: Cricinfo, 14 December 2011

Marc Chin (born 8 September 1987) is a Caymanian cricketer. Chin is a right-handed batsman who bowls right-arm off break.

Chin made a single first-class appearance for the Cayman Islands against Canada at the Toronto Cricket, Skating and Curling Club in the 2005 Intercontinental Cup. He was dismissed for a duck in the Cayman Islands first-innings by Henry Osinde. In Canada's first-innings, he took the wickets of Ashish Bagai and Nicholas Ifill, finishing with figures of 2/104 from twenty overs. In the Cayman Islands second-innings he was dismissed for 14 runs by Kevin Sandher. In Canada's second-innings, he took the wicket of Bagai once more, finishing with figures of 1/36 from ten overs. Canada won the match by 120 runs.
