= Ainsley Hall =

Cayman Islands cricketer

Personal information
- Born: 23 June 1972 (age 54); Jamaica
- Batting: Right-handed
- Bowling: Right-arm medium pace
- Role: Wicket-keeper

Career statistics
Competition	First-class	T20
Matches	2	2
Runs scored	51	12
Batting average	12.75	6.00
100s/50s	0/0	0/0
Top score	30	10
Catches/stumpings	1/0	0/1
- Source: CricketArchive, 20 August 2007

Ainsley Hall (born 23 June 1972) is a Cayman Islands cricketer. A right-handed batsman and wicket-keeper, he has played for the Cayman Islands national cricket team since 2005.

== Playing career ==
Ainsley Hall made his debut for the Cayman Islands in the repêchage tournament for the 2005 ICC Trophy in Kuala Lumpur in February 2005. He played three matches in the tournament, winning the man of the match award against Italy after top-scoring with 51 in the Cayman Islands' innings. He made his first-class debut in August of that year, playing against Bermuda and Canada in the 2005 ICC Intercontinental Cup at the Toronto Cricket, Skating and Curling Club.

The following year, he played for the Cayman Islands in their two Stanford 20/20 matches against the Bahamas and Trinidad & Tobago. He most recently represented the Cayman Islands at Division Three of the World Cricket League in Darwin, Australia in May/June 2007.
