= 2007 ICC World Cricket League Division Three =

- Administrator: International Cricket Council
- Cricket format: List A
- Tournament format(s): Round-robin and knockout
- Participants: 8

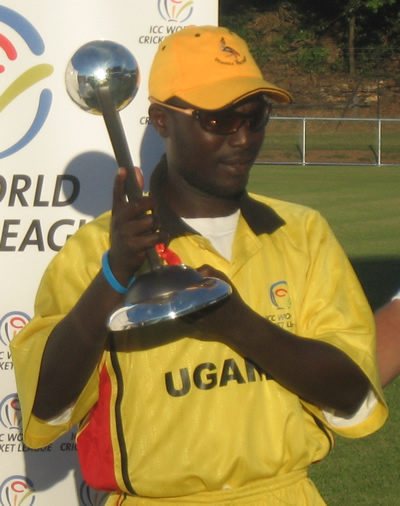
Winning Captain Joel Olweny proudly displays the trophy after Uganda's victory

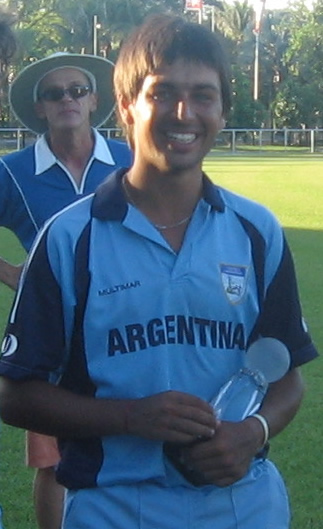
Argentina Captain Estaban MacDermott was named Player of the Tournament

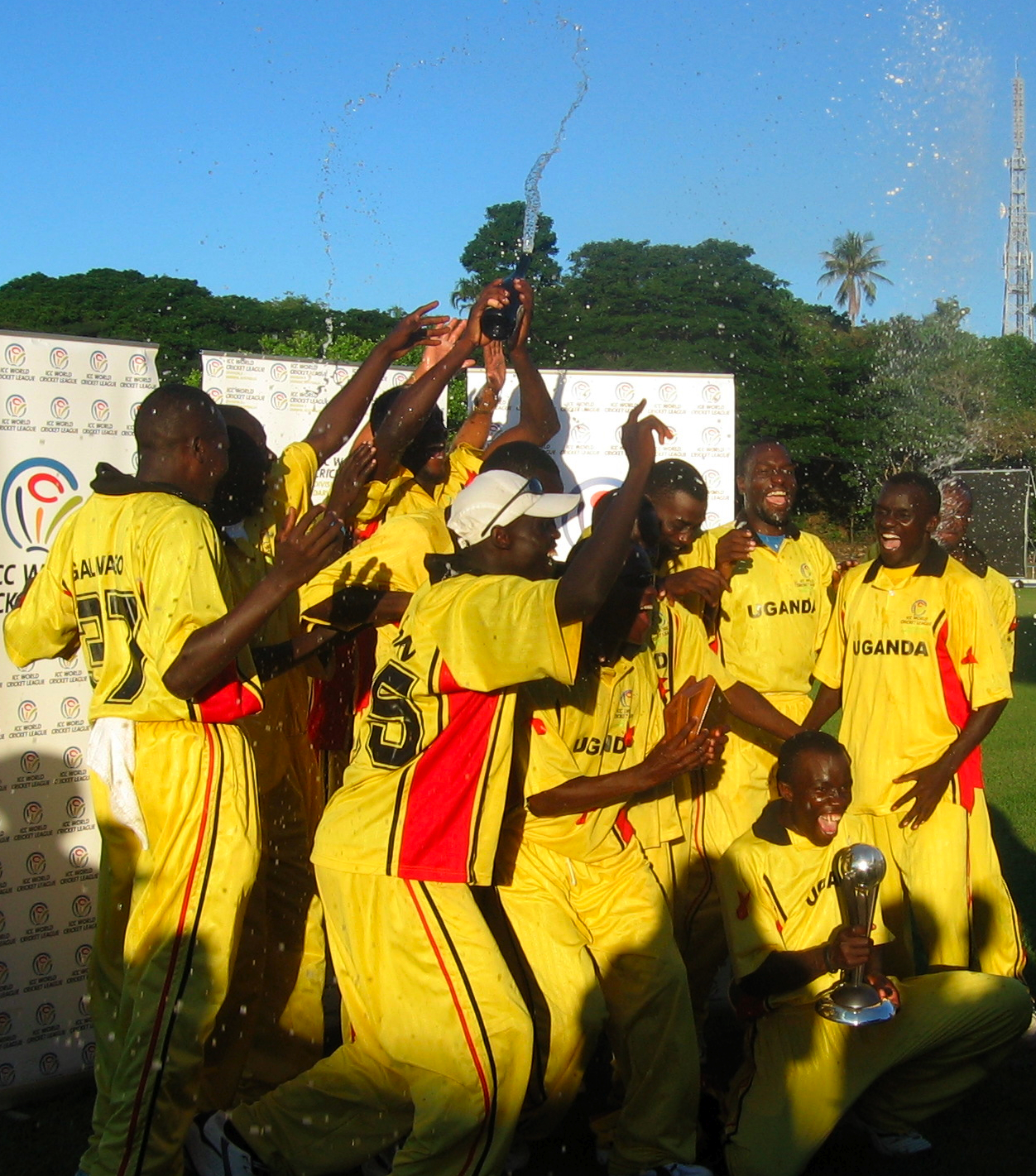
The celebrations begin for the victorious Uganda team

The 2007 ICC World Cricket League Division Three was a cricket tournament played in Darwin, Australia between 27 May and 2 June 2007. The tournament formed part of the qualification structure for the 2011 World Cup as well as part of the wider ICC World Cricket League.

At the end of the tournament, the teams were distributed in the divisions of the ICC World Cricket League as follows:

- 1st and 2nd place: 2007 Division Two
- 3rd and 4th place: 2009 Division Three
- 5th to 8th place: 2008 Division Four

== Teams ==
USA, Papua New Guinea and Uganda qualified due to their participation in the 2005 ICC Trophy. The other five teams are the next best qualifiers from their respective ICC Development Regions.

USA were suspended by the ICC and withdrawn from the tournament, with Argentina taking their place.

Group A	Group B
Papua New Guinea (1)	Uganda (2)
Fiji (3)	Hong Kong (4)
Italy (6)	Cayman Islands (5)
Argentina (8)	Tanzania (7)

(Seedings indicated in brackets)

== Squads ==
Argentina Coach: Hamish Barton	Cayman Islands Coach: Theo Cuffy	Fiji Coach: Steve Mulally	Hong Kong Coach: Sameer Dighe
Esteban Macdermott (c); Pedro Bruno; Grant Dugmore; Alejandro Ferguson; Pablo Ferguson; Donald Forrester; Carlos Gibson; Diego Lord; Estaban Nino; Lucas Paterlini; Matias Paterlini; Pablo Ryan; Gary Savage; Martin Siri	Ryan Bovell (c); Steve Gordon (vc); Pearson Best; Ronald Ebanks; Ryan Ebanks; Ainsley Hall; Franklyn Hinds; Keniel Irving; Joseph Kirkconnell; Jalon Linton; Saheed Mohamed; Troy Taylor; Kenute Tulloch; Michael Wight	Seci Tuiwai (c); Iniasi Cakacaka (vc); Taione Batina; Samu Draunivudi; Inoke Lesuma; Sakaraia Lomani; Vuiyasawa Mateiwaqa; Iliesa Navatu; Rajeev Patel; Sekove Ravoka; Colin Rika; Josefa Rika; Filimoni Vuliwaqa; Taniela Waqatuinayau	Ilyas Gull (c); Najeeb Aamer (vc); Zain Abbas; Irfan Ahmed; Nadeem Ahmed; Hussain Butt; Tabarak Dar; Mark Eames; Afzaal Haider; Nasir Hameed; Khalid Khan; Mark Kratzmann; Courtney Kruger; Rahul Sharma
Italy Player-coach: Joe Scuderi	Papua New Guinea Coach: Api Leka, Sr.	Tanzania Coach: Zully Rehemtulla	Uganda Coach: Sam Walusimbi
Joe Scuderi (c); Faheem Abid; Din Alaud; Alessandro Bonora; Andrea Corbellari; Troy Crosland; Samantha Ketipe; Thushara Kurukulasuriya; Hemantha Jayasena; Michel Minghetti; Andy Northcote; Nicholas Northcote; Kelum Perera; Nicola Puccio	Rarua Dikana (c); Chris Amini; Hitolo Areni; Inoa Baeau; Jamie Brazier; Mahuru Dai; Frank Doura; Mahutu Kivung; Api Leka, Jr.; Loa Nou; John Ovia; Piki Ravusiro; Arua Uda; Assad Vala	Hamisi Abdallah (c); Hasnain Damji; Shaheed Dhanani; Bhavesh Govind; Athumani Kakonzi; Issa Kikasi; Riziki Kiseto; Hatim Kudrati; Benson Mwita; Kassim Nassoro; Rishen Patel; Khalil Rehmtullah; Enjo Seti	Joel Olwenyi (c); Kenneth Kamyuka; Junior Kwebiha; Arthur Kyobe; Roger Mukasa; Benjamin Musoke; Frank Nsubuga; Patrick Ochan; Jimmy Okello; Richard Okia; Raymond Otim; Ronald Semanda; Lawrence Sematimba; Charles Waiswa

== Group stage ==
=== Group A ===
Pos	Team	Pld	W	L	T	NR	Pts	NRR
1	Argentina	3	2	1	0	0	4	1.200
2	Papua New Guinea	3	2	1	0	0	4	0.176
3	Italy	3	2	1	0	0	4	−0.139
4	Fiji	3	0	3	0	0	0	−1.361

27 May 2007
scorecard

Fiji; 138 all out (46.4 overs)	v	Papua New Guinea; 142/9 (49.5 overs)
Josefa Rika 33; John Ovia 2/13		Christopher Amini 71*; Vuiyasawa Mateiwaqa 3/20

Papua New Guinea won by 1 wicket
Power Park, Darwin
Umpires: JK Brookes and SS Prasad
Player of the match: Christopher Amini

27 May 2007
scorecard

Italy; 175/9 (50 overs)	v	Argentina; 174 all out (50 overs)
Joe Scuderi 35; Gary Savage 2/18		Donald Forrester 66; Din Alaud 3/29

Italy won by 1 run
Gardens Oval, Darwin
Umpires: BNJ Oxenford and Shahul Hameed

28 May 2007
scorecard

Papua New Guinea; 91 all out (40.1 overs)	v	Argentina; 92/5 (40.3 overs)
Mahuta Kivung 19; Esteban MacDermott 4/22		Donald Forrester 44*; Jamie Brazier 2/20

Argentina won by 5 wickets
Gardens Oval, Darwin
Umpires: ND Harrison and TP Laycock
Player of the match: Esteban MacDermott

28 May 2007
scorecard

Italy; 186/9 (50 overs)	v	Fiji; 149 all out (45.4 overs)
Din Alaud 39*; Iniasi Cakacaka 3/30		Vuiyasawa Mateiwaqa 31; Din Alaud 3/13

Italy won by 37 runs
Marrara Oval No 1, Darwin
Umpires: SD Fry and L Oala

30 May 2007
scorecard

Italy; 134/9 (50 overs)	v	Papua New Guinea; 135/2 (33.1 overs)
Joe Scuderi 30; Jamie Brazier 3/18		Arua Uda 58; Andy Northcote 1/23

Papua New Guinea won by 8 wickets
Nightcliff Oval, Darwin
Umpires: ND Harrison and BNJ Oxenford
Player of the match: Arua Uda

30 May 2007
scorecard

Fiji; 44 all out (21.2 overs)	v	Argentina; 46/0 (5 overs)
Vuiyasawa Mateiwaqa 16; Estaban Nino 4/16		Lucas Paterlini 25*; Grant Dugmore 17*

Argentina won by 10 wickets
Marrara Oval No 2, Darwin
Umpires: SD Fry and SS Prasad
Player of the match: Estaban Nino

=== Group B ===
Pos	Team	Pld	W	L	T	NR	Pts	NRR
1	Uganda	3	3	0	0	0	6	1.493
2	Cayman Islands	3	2	1	0	0	4	1.030
3	Tanzania	3	1	2	0	0	2	−0.767
4	Hong Kong	3	0	3	0	0	0	−1.926

27 May 2007
scorecard

Uganda; 220/5 (50 overs)	v	Hong Kong; 129 all out (36.5 overs)
Joel Olweny 60; Afzaal Haider 2/31		Irfan Ahmed 34*; Joel Olweny 3/15

Uganda won by 92 runs
Kahlin Oval, Darwin
Umpires: SD Fry and ND Harrison
Player of the match: Joel Olweny

27 May 2007
scorecard

Tanzania; 206/6 (50 overs)	v	Cayman Islands; 210/0 (45.4 overs)
Athumani Kakonzi 82*; Ronald Ebanks 3/40		Steve Gordon 104*; Hamisi Abdallah 0/30

Cayman Islands won by 10 wickets
Tracy Village Oval, Darwin
Umpires: TP Laycock and L Oala

28 May 2007
scorecard

Tanzania; 64 all out (24.1 overs)	v	Uganda; 70/6 (22.1 overs)
Benson Mwita 13; Charles Waiswa 3/7		Junior Kwebiha 13; Benson Mwita 4/23

Uganda won by 4 wickets
Nightcliff Oval, Darwin
Umpires: BNJ Oxenford and SS Prasad
Player of the match: Benson Mwita

28 May 2007
scorecard

Hong Kong; 67 all out (24.5 overs)	v	Cayman Islands; 70/2 (9.3 overs)
Irfan Ahmed 21; Franklin Hinds 4/22		Keniel Irving 29*; Irfan Ahmed 2/25

Cayman Islands won by 8 wickets
Power Park, Darwin
Umpires: JK Brookes and Shahul Hameed
Player of the match: Franklin Hinds

30 May 2007
scorecard

Uganda; 153 all out (48.3 overs)	v	Cayman Islands; 127 all out (48.2 overs)
Arthur Kyobe 37; Michael Wight 4/30		Steve Gordon 37; Junior Kwebiha 4/11

Uganda won by 26 runs
Marrara Oval No 1, Darwin
Umpires: JK Brookes and L Oala
Player of the match: Junior Kwebiha

30 May 2007
scorecard

Hong Kong; 161 all out (47.2 overs)	v	Tanzania; 165/5 (46.1 overs)
Rahul Sharma 43; Bhavesh Govind 3/31		Abhik Patwa 44; Najeeb Amar 2/16

Tanzania won by 5 wickets
Tracy Village Oval, Darwin
Umpires: TP Laycock and Shahul Hameed
Player of the match: Abhik Patwa

== Semifinals ==
31 May 2007
scorecard

Cayman Islands; 102 all out (39.3 overs)	v	Argentina; 103/6 (34.2 overs)
Steve Gordon 37; Estaban MacDermott 4/20		Alejandro Ferguson 25*; Franklin Hinds 3/11

Argentina won by 4 wickets
Gardens Oval, Darwin
Umpires: JK Brookes and ND Harrison
Player of the match: Estaban MacDermott

31 May 2007
scorecard

Papua New Guinea; 203/6 (50 overs)	v	Uganda; 204/9 (49.2 overs)
Mahuru Dai 86; Charles Waiswa 2/17		Kenneth Kamyuka 43*; Jamie Brazier 4/17

Uganda won by 1 wicket
Tracy Village Oval, Darwin
Umpires: SD Fry and Shahul Hameed
Player of the match: Kenneth Kamyuka

== Final ==
2 June 2007
scorecard

Uganda; 241/8 (50 overs)	v	Argentina; 150 all out (46.3 overs)
Patrick Ochan 56*; Estaban MacDermott 3/56		Alejandro Ferguson 41; Frank Nsubuga 4/27

Uganda won by 91 runs
Gardens Oval, Darwin
Umpires: BNJ Oxenford and L Oala
Player of the match: Frank Nsubuga
Player of the Tournament: Estaban MacDermott

== Plate ==
31 May 2007
scorecard

Hong Kong; 195 all out (50 overs)	v	Italy; 146 all out (45 overs)
Courtney Kruger 50; Andy Northcote 3/35		Andy Northcote 47; Ilyas Gull 3/37

Hong Kong won by 49 runs
Marrara Oval No 2, Darwin
Umpires: L Oala and BNJ Oxenford
Player of the match: Andy Northcote (Italy)

- Plate Semi-finals

31 May 2007
scorecard

Fiji; 173 all out (48.5 overs)	v	Tanzania; 174/7 (43.4 overs)
Iniasi Cakacaka 43; Benson Mwita 3/25		Athumani Kakonzi 59; Rajeev Patel 4/21

Tanzania won by 3 wickets
Marrara Oval No 1, Darwin
Umpires: TP Laycock and SS Prasad
Player of the match: Athumani Kakonzi

- Plate Semi-finals

2 June 2007
scorecard

Papua New Guinea; 263/6 (50 overs)	v	Cayman Islands; 240/9 (50 overs)
Mahuru Dai 102*; Franklin Hinds 2/29		Steve Gordon 74; Rarua Dikana 5/37

Papua New Guinea won by 23 runs
Marrara Oval No 1, Darwin
Umpires: SD Fry and SS Prasad
Player of the match: Mahuru Dai

- Playoff 3rd/4th

2 June 2007
scorecard

Hong Kong; 242/6 (50 overs)	v	Tanzania; 113 all out (33.1 overs)
Rahul Sharma 85; Hamisi Abdallah 2/47		Kassim Nassoro 37; Nadeem Ahmed 3/12

Hong Kong won by 129 runs
Power Park, Darwin
Umpires: JK Brookes and Shahul Hameed
Player of the match: Rahul Sharma

- Playoff 5th/6th

2 June 2007
scorecard

Fiji; 123 all out (47.4 overs)	v	Italy; 124/4 (31.2 overs)
Iniasi Cakacaka 30; Thusahara Kurukulasuriya 4/16		Thusahara Kurukulasuriya 51; Taione Batina 1/6 (5 overs)

Italy won by 6 wickets
Nightcliff Oval, Darwin
Umpires: ND Harrison and TP Laycock
Player of the match: Thusahara Kurukulasuriya (Italy)

- Playoff 7th/8th

== Final placings ==
Pos	Team	Promotion or relegation
1st	Uganda	Promoted to 2007 Global Division Two
2nd	Argentina	Promoted to 2007 Global Division Two
3rd	Papua New Guinea	Remain in 2009 Global Division Three
4th	Cayman Islands	Remain in 2009 Global Division Three
5th	Hong Kong	Relegated to 2008 Global Division Four
6th	Tanzania	Relegated to 2008 Global Division Four
7th	Italy	Relegated to 2008 Global Division Four
8th	Fiji	Relegated to 2008 Global Division Four

== Statistics ==
Most runs		Most wickets	
(Cayman Islands) Steve Gordon	253	(Argentina) Estaban MacDermott	12
(Papua New Guinea) Mahuru Dai	203	(Uganda) Charles Waiswa	11
(Tanzania) Athumani Kakonzi	158	(Papua New Guinea) Jamie Brazier	11
(Hong Kong) Irfan Ahmed	153	(Argentina) Gary Savage	10
(Argentina) Donald Forrester	148	(Cayman Islands) Franklin Hinds	10
(Hong Kong) Rahul Sharma	131	(Tanzania) Benson Mwita	10
