= Ahmed Shah (Afghan cricketer) =

Afghan cricketer (born 1983)

Personal information
- Full name: Ahmed Shah Ahmedzi
- Born: 20 October 1983 (age 43); Paktika Province, Afghanistan
- Batting: Left-handed
- Bowling: Slow left-arm orthodox

International information
- National side: Afghanistan
- Only ODI (cap 12): 30 August 2009 v Netherlands

Career statistics
| Competition | ODI | First-class |
|---|---|---|
| Matches | 1 | 2 |
| Runs scored | 2 | 82 |
| Batting average | 2.00 | 20.50 |
| 100s/50s | 0/0 | 0/0 |
| Top score | 2 | 40 |
| Balls bowled | 6 | 84 |
| Wickets | 0 | 0 |
| Bowling average | – | – |
| 5 wickets in innings | – | – |
| 10 wickets in match | – | – |
| Best bowling | – | – |
| Catches/stumpings | 0/– | 1/– |
- Source: Cricinfo, 11 September 2009

Ahmed Shah (born 20 October 1983) is a left-handed batsman and a slow left-arm orthodox bowler who plays for Afghanistan.

He is a part of the Afghan cricket team that has won the World Cricket League Division Five, Division Four and Division Three, thus promoting them to Division Two and allowing them to partake in the 2009 ICC World Cup Qualifier where they gained ODI status.

Shah made his ODI debut against the Netherlands at the VRA Cricket Ground on 30 August 2009. Shah also made his first class debut in Afghanistan's debut match in the Intercontinental Cup against a Zimbabwe XI at Mutare on 16 August 2009.
