= Saheed Mohamed =

Cayman Islands cricketer

Personal information
- Full name: Saheed Mohamed
- Born: 6 February 1976 (age 50); Guyana
- Batting: Right-handed
- Bowling: Off spin
- Role: Batsman

Career statistics
Competition	Twenty20
Matches	2
Runs scored	77
Batting average	77.00
100s/50s	0/1
Top score	64*
Balls bowled	36
Wickets	2
Bowling average	16.00
5 wickets in innings	0
10 wickets in match	0
Best bowling	2/13
Catches/stumpings	0/0
- Source: CricketArchive, 23 September 2007

Saheed Mohamed (born 6 February 1976) is a Cayman Islands cricketer. A right-handed batsman and off spin bowler, he has played for the Cayman Islands national cricket team since 2004.

== Career ==
Saheed Mohamed first played cricket for the Cayman Islands in the 2004 Americas Championship, and the following year played in the repêchage tournament for the 2005 ICC Trophy in Kuala Lumpur in February 2005.

In 2006, he played against the Bahamas and Trinidad & Tobago in the Stanford 20/20. He scored 64 not out against the Bahamas to help his team reach the first round proper of the tournament. He followed this by playing in the Americas Championship at the Maple Leaf Cricket Club in King City, Ontario.

He most recently represented the Cayman Islands in Division Three of the World Cricket League in Darwin, Australia. In the third place play-off against Papua New Guinea, he put in a fine all-round performance, taking 2/53 and scoring 52, but this was not enough to help his team win the match.
