= Junior Kwebiha =

Ugandan cricketer (born 1981)

Cricket information
- Batting: Right-handed
- Bowling: Right-arm medium

International information
- National side: Uganda

Career statistics
Competition	First-class	List A
Matches	3	7
Runs scored	142	28
Batting average	28.40	4.66
100s/50s	0/0	0/0
Top score	39	11
Balls bowled	330	312
Wickets	158	6
Bowling average	31.60	29.83
5 wickets in innings	0	0
10 wickets in match	0	0
Best bowling	2/43	2/31
Catches/stumpings	4/–	4/–
- Source: CricketArchive, 16 November 2022

Junior Kwebiha (born 7 January 1981) is a Ugandan cricketer. A right-handed batsman and right-arm medium pace bowler, he has played for the Uganda national cricket team since 2001. His matches include three first-class matches and seven List A matches.

== Playing career ==
Kwebiha first played for Uganda in 2001, at the 2001 ICC Trophy in Canada. He made his first-class debut in 2004, playing against Namibia and Kenya in the ICC Intercontinental Cup. He also played a match in the 2005 tournament against Namibia. He made his List A debut in 2005, playing in the 2005 ICC Trophy in Ireland.

He has continued in the Ugandan team, playing matches against Bermuda and Canada in January 2007, before representing Uganda in Division Three of the World Cricket League later in the year, a tournament that Uganda won. He won the man of the match award in Uganda's match against the Cayman Islands after taking 4/11 in the Cayman Islands innings.
