= Ronald Ebanks =

Caymanian cricketer

Personal information
- Full name: Ronald Ebanks
- Born: 21 April 1983 (age 43); Cayman Islands
- Batting: Right-handed
- Bowling: Right-arm medium-pace/off spin
- Role: Batsman

International information
- National side: Cayman Islands
- T20I debut (cap 33): 10 December 2024 v Suriname
- Last T20I: 12 December 2024 v Bahamas
- Source: Cricinfo, 12 December 2024

Ronald Ebanks (born 21 April 1983 in the Cayman Islands) is a Caymanian cricketer. A right-handed batsman and right-arm medium-pace and off spin bowler, he has played for the Cayman Islands national cricket team since 2004.

== Education ==
Ronald Ebanks was accepted at The University of Birmingham, UK and as of June 2010 is currently in his third year of a Master in Science in Analytical Science (MSci) degree at the university's School of Chemistry.

Since his first year at the university, Ronald also plays for The University of Birmingham's 1st cricket team who train at the facilities at the nearby Edgbaston Cricket Ground.

== Playing career ==
Ronald Ebanks made his debut for the Cayman Islands in July 2004, playing in the ICC Americas Championship against Argentina and the Bahamas in Bermuda. He played in the repêchage tournament for the 2005 ICC Trophy in Kuala Lumpur in February 2005, playing in the first round group matches against Fiji, Qatar and Zambia, but played no part in the knock-out stages as the Cayman Islands finished fifth after beating Kuwait in a play-off.

He made his first-class debut for the Cayman Islands in August 2005, playing two 2005 ICC Intercontinental Cup matches against Bermuda and Canada at the Toronto Cricket, Skating and Curling Club. He returned to Canada in August the following year to play in the Americas Championship at the Maple Leaf Cricket Club. He most recently played for the Cayman Islands in Division Three of the World Cricket League in Darwin, Australia, a tournament in which the Caymans finished fourth after losing to Papua New Guinea in a play-off.
