= Courtney Kruger =

South African-born batsman (born 1988)

Personal information
- Full name: Courtney Keith Kruger
- Born: 18 February 1988 (age 38); South Africa
- Batting: Right-handed
- Role: Batsman

International information
- National side: Hong Kong
- ODI debut: 24 June 2008 v Pakistan
- Last ODI: 25 June 2008 v India

Career statistics
Competition	ODI	LA	T20
Matches	2	9	9
Runs scored	3	44	36
Batting average	1.50	4.88	6.00
100s/50s	0/0	0/0	0/0
Top score	3	18	20
Catches/stumpings	0/–	2/–	0/–
- Source: CricketArchive, 01 February 2014

Courtney Keith Kruger (born 18 February 1988) is a South African-born batsman who has played two One Day Internationals for Hong Kong.

Kruger made his One Day International debut in the 2008 Asia Cup, playing in Hong Kong's games against Pakistan and India, but scored just 0 and 3.

== Cricket career ==
Courtney Kruger made his Hong Kong debut in 2004, aged sixteen, after finding moderate success in the ACC Fast Track Tournament, playing only one of Hong Kong's matches as they finished second behind the United Arab Emirates. He had to wait almost two years for his next cap, which came to him in the 2006 Trophy, where he played in all of Hong Kong's matches in their run to the final, earning Hong Kong their second Asia Cup appearance. Kruger himself had little impact with the team but he was being talked about as a leadership prospect already.

His World Cricket League debut came in the 2007 Division Three tournament in the north of Australia. He scored his first, and so far only, international half-century against Italy in Darwin, anchoring his team's winning total of 195. In the next edition of Division Three, 2011, Kruger began to realise his potential with a brace of 40s against Oman and Denmark in victories that contributed to their promotion to Division Two, which carried List A status.

In his Hong Kong career, Kruger has represented his country in 54 internationals, as well as seven non-internationals against historic English club sides, and the Sri Lanka colts. He has a total of 466 international runs, with a highest score of 50 against Italy in 2007.

As well as full internationals, Kruger was also a regular in the Hong Kong Under-17 and Under-19 teams. He made his Under-19 debut before representing the Under-17s and was only fifteen years of age at the time. He was a part of the same group of players that contained Hong Kong mainstays Irfan Ahmed, Nadeem Ahmed and Jamie Atkinson, a golden generation of Hong Kong home-grown talent.

== Illness ==
In November 2007, Kruger was travelling home from representing Hong Kong at the ACC Twenty20 when he complained of debilitating headaches. When he returned to Hong Kong, doctors discovered an abscess in his brain. To relieve the pressure, half of Kruger's skull had to be removed for three months; he was bedridden for six. He recovered to make his ODI debut against Pakistan in June 2008.
