= Jamie Brazier =

Papua New Guinean cricketer

Personal information
- Full name: Jamie Lee Brazier
- Born: 19 April 1975 (age 51); Port Moresby, Papua New Guinea
- Batting: Right-handed
- Bowling: Off spin
- Role: All-rounder

Career statistics
Competition	List A	ICC T
Matches	7	12
Runs scored	67	161
Batting average	9.57	13.41
100s/50s	0/0	0/1
Top score	17	53
Balls bowled	216	216
Wickets	6	6
Bowling average	21.83	21.83
5 wickets in innings	0	0
10 wickets in match	0	0
Best bowling	3/24	3/24
Catches/stumpings	4/0	4/0
- Source: CricketArchive, 14 July 2008

Jamie Lee Brazier (born 19 April 1975) is a Papua New Guinean cricketer. A right-handed batsman and off spin bowler, he has played for the Papua New Guinea national cricket team since 2001.

== Personal life ==
Born in Port Moresby in 1975, Jamie Brazier was educated at Murray International Primary School in his home town before attending Barker College in Sydney. He then moved on to Newcastle High School before attending Oxford University, where he gained a degree in law. Outside of cricket, he works as branch manager of a pest control business in Port Moresby.

== Cricket career ==
Jamie Brazier made his debut for Papua New Guinea in an ICC Trophy warm-up match against Scotland at the Kaiteur Cricket Club in Kitchener, Ontario, Canada. He played five matches in the tournament itself. He represented Papua New Guinea at the 2003 South Pacific Games in Fiji, winning a gold medal in the cricket tournament.

The following year, he played for a combined East Asia Pacific team in the Australian National Country Cricket Championships. He has played in the tournament every year since. In 2005 he played in the repêchage tournament of the 2005 ICC Trophy. Papua New Guinea won the tournament after beating Fiji in the final. Brazier was named man of the match in the final. This qualified them for the 2005 ICC Trophy in Ireland in which Brazier played, making his List A debut.

He most recently represented his country at Division Three of the World Cricket League in Darwin in 2007.
