= Troy Taylor (cricketer) =

Caymanian cricketer (born 1984)

Personal information
- Full name: Troy Taylor
- Born: 28 February 1984 (age 42); Cayman Islands
- Batting: Right-handed
- Bowling: Right-arm medium-fast
- Role: Bowler

International information
- National side: Cayman Islands
- T20I debut (cap 9): 18 August 2019 v Canada
- Last T20I: 4 March 2023 v Argentina

Career statistics
Competition	T20I	FC	T20
Matches	13	2	13
Runs scored	136	0	136
Batting average	17.00	0.00	17.00
100s/50s	–/–	–/–	–/–
Top score	42	0*	42
Balls bowled	186	245	186
Wickets	8	6	8
Bowling average	26.75	26.33	26.75
5 wickets in innings	–	–	–
10 wickets in match	–	–	–
Best bowling	3/22	4/60	3/22
Catches/stumpings	4/–	–/–	4/–
- Source: Cricinfo, 5 March 2023

Troy Taylor (born 28 February 1984 in the Cayman Islands) is a Caymanian cricketer and has played for the Cayman Islands national cricket team since 2005, having previously represented them at Under-19 level. He is a right-handed batsman and right-arm medium-fast bowler.

== Career ==
Taylor's first taste of international cricket came as part of the 2003 Americas Under-19 Championship in King City, Ontario, where he was the leading wicket-taker. He won man of the match, after taking 7/12 against Bermuda, which was at the time a tournament record. Taylor made his senior debut in the repêchage tournament for the 2005 ICC Trophy, against Fiji.

He made his first-class debut in the 2005 ICC Intercontinental Cup, playing against Bermuda and Canada at the Toronto Cricket, Skating and Curling Club. He next played for the Cayman Islands in the ICC Americas Championship in King City in August 2006, and hasn't played for them since, though he was in their squad for Division Three of the World Cricket League in Darwin, Australia in 2007.

In August 2019, he was named in the Cayman Islands cricket team's Twenty20 International (T20I) squad for the Regional Finals of the 2018–19 ICC T20 World Cup Americas Qualifier tournament. He made his T20I debut for the Cayman Islands against Canada on 18 August 2019.
