= Peter Moide =

Papua New Guinean cricketer (born 1974)

Personal information
- Born: 19 April 1974 (age 52); Papua New Guinea

Career statistics
Competition	List A
Matches	2
Runs scored	8
Batting average	4.00
100s/50s	0/0
Top score	8
Catches/stumpings	0/0
- Source: CricketArchive, 14 July 2008

Peter Moide (born 19 April 1974) is a Papua New Guinean cricketer who has played for the Papua New Guinea national cricket team in two tournaments - the 1998 ACC Trophy and the 2005 ICC Trophy, where he played his two List A matches.
