= Hurlingham Club Ground =

Cricket ground in Greater Buenos Aires, Argentina

Coordinates: 34°35′07.98″S 58°37′49.27″W

- Interactive map of Hurlingham Club Ground

Ground information
- Location: Hurlingham, Buenos Aires
- Country: Argentina
- Home club: Hurlingham Club
- Establishment: 1890; 136 years ago
- Tenants: Hurlingham Club (1890–present); Argentina national team (1912–present)

International information
- First men's T20I: 25 February 2023: Argentina v Panama
- Last men's T20I: 15 December 2024: Mexico v Panama
- As of 15 December 2024; Source: Cricket archive

The Hurlingham Club Ground is a cricket ground located in the Hurlingham district of Greater Buenos Aires, Argentina. Owned by the Hurlingham Club, it was inaugurated in 1890 with the first cricket game held in Hurlingham, the first international recorded match held on the ground came in 1896 when the North of Argentina played the South of Argentina.

First-class cricket was first played there in 1912 when Argentina played the Marylebone Cricket Club. Four further first-class matches were played there, the last of which saw Argentina play Sir TEW Brinckman's XI in 1938.

Still in use to the present day, the ground held matches in the South American Championships and the Americas Championships in recent times, as well as hosting matches in the 2009 ICC World Cricket League Division Three.
