= Pearson Best =

Caymanian cricketer

Personal information
- Born: 20 December 1963 (age 62); Barbados
- Batting: Right-handed
- Bowling: Right arm medium-slow

International information
- National side: Cayman Islands (2000–2012)

Career statistics
Competition	First-class	List A
Matches	2	4
Runs scored	121	66
Batting average	30.25	16.50
100s/50s	0/1	0/0
Top score	53	34
Balls bowled	81	0
Wickets	0	–
Bowling average	–	–
5 wickets in innings	–	–
10 wickets in match	–	–
Best bowling	–	–
Catches/stumpings	2/–	1/–
- Source: CricketArchive, 16 November 2022

Pearson Best (born 20 December 1963) is a former Cayman Islands cricketer. An all-rounder, he is a right-handed batsman and right-arm slow-medium bowler, he played for the Cayman Islands national cricket team from 2000 to 2012. His matches include two first-class and four List A matches.

== Personal life ==
Best was born in Barbados and moved to the Caymans around 1998 to work for the Royal Cayman Islands Police Service. In 2005 he was stationed on Cayman Brac.

== Playing career ==
Best made his debut for the Cayman Islands in the Red Stripe Bowl, a domestic competition in the West Indies, in October 2000. He played four matches in the tournament, making up his only four List A matches to date. He played in the ICC Americas Championship in 2002 and 2004 and in the repêchage tournament for the 2005 ICC Trophy in 2005. In the latter tournament, he won man of the match awards for his performances against Kuwait and Zambia, finishing the tournament with the best batting average (76.33) and the second highest score of 99 not out.

In August 2005 he played his, to date, only first-class matches, 2005 ICC Intercontinental Cup matches against Bermuda and Canada. In 2006, he played for the Cayman Islands in the inaugural Stanford 20/20 tournament. He top scored with 74 in the preliminary round against the Bahamas, winning $25,000 for the man of the match award, but only scored three in the first round proper against Trinidad & Tobago as the Caymans were knocked out of the tournament. Only three players made a higher individual score in the tournament.

Later in 2006, he again played in the Americas Championship. He was the second highest scorer in the tournament, winning the man of the match award for his top score of 116 against Argentina. He most recently represented the Cayman Islands at Division Three of the World Cricket League in Darwin, Australia in May/June 2007.
