= Ryan Bovell =

Caymanian cricketer (born 1974)

Personal information
- Full name: Ryan Devere Bovell
- Born: 24 January 1974 (age 52); Saint Lucy, Barbados
- Batting: Right-handed
- Bowling: Right-arm medium-fast

International information
- National side: Cayman Islands

Domestic team information
- Years: Team
- 2001/01–2007/08: Cayman Islands

Career statistics
Competition	FC	LA	T20
Matches	2	4	1
Runs scored	97	11	1
Batting average	32.33	3.66	1.00
100s/50s	0/0	0/0	0/0
Top score	44	8	1
Balls bowled	255	171	12
Wickets	7	3	0
Bowling average	17.85	49.66	–
5 wickets in innings	0	0	–
10 wickets in match	0	0	–
Best bowling	3/62	1/29	–
Catches/stumpings	1/–	2/–	0/–
- Source: Cricinfo, 27 January 2025

Ryan Devere Bovell (born 24 January 1974) is a cricketer who captained the Cayman Islands national cricket team. He led the country to the 2007 ICC World Cricket League Division Three tournament in Darwin, Australia where the Cayman Islands were eliminated at the semi-final stage, and in the 2005 ICC Intercontinental Cup which had first-class status.
