= Hussain Butt =

Pakistani-born cricketer

Personal information
- Full name: Khaled Hussain Butt
- Born: 6 February 1978 (age 48); Gujranwala, Pakistan
- Batting: Right-handed
- Bowling: Right-arm fast-medium
- Role: Batsman

International information
- National side: Hong Kong
- ODI debut (cap 15): 24 June 2008 v Pakistan
- Last ODI: 25 June 2008 v India

Career statistics
Competition	ODI
Matches	2
Runs scored	8
Batting average	4.00
100s/50s	0/0
Top score	4
Balls bowled	–
Wickets	–
Bowling average	–
5 wickets in innings	–
10 wickets in match	–
Best bowling	–
Catches/stumpings	1/–
- Source: CricketArchive, 29 November 2008

Khaled Hussain Butt (born 6 February 1978) is a Pakistani-born former international cricketer, who has played two One Day Internationals for Hong Kong.
