= Burzaco =

City in Buenos Aires Province, Argentina

- City
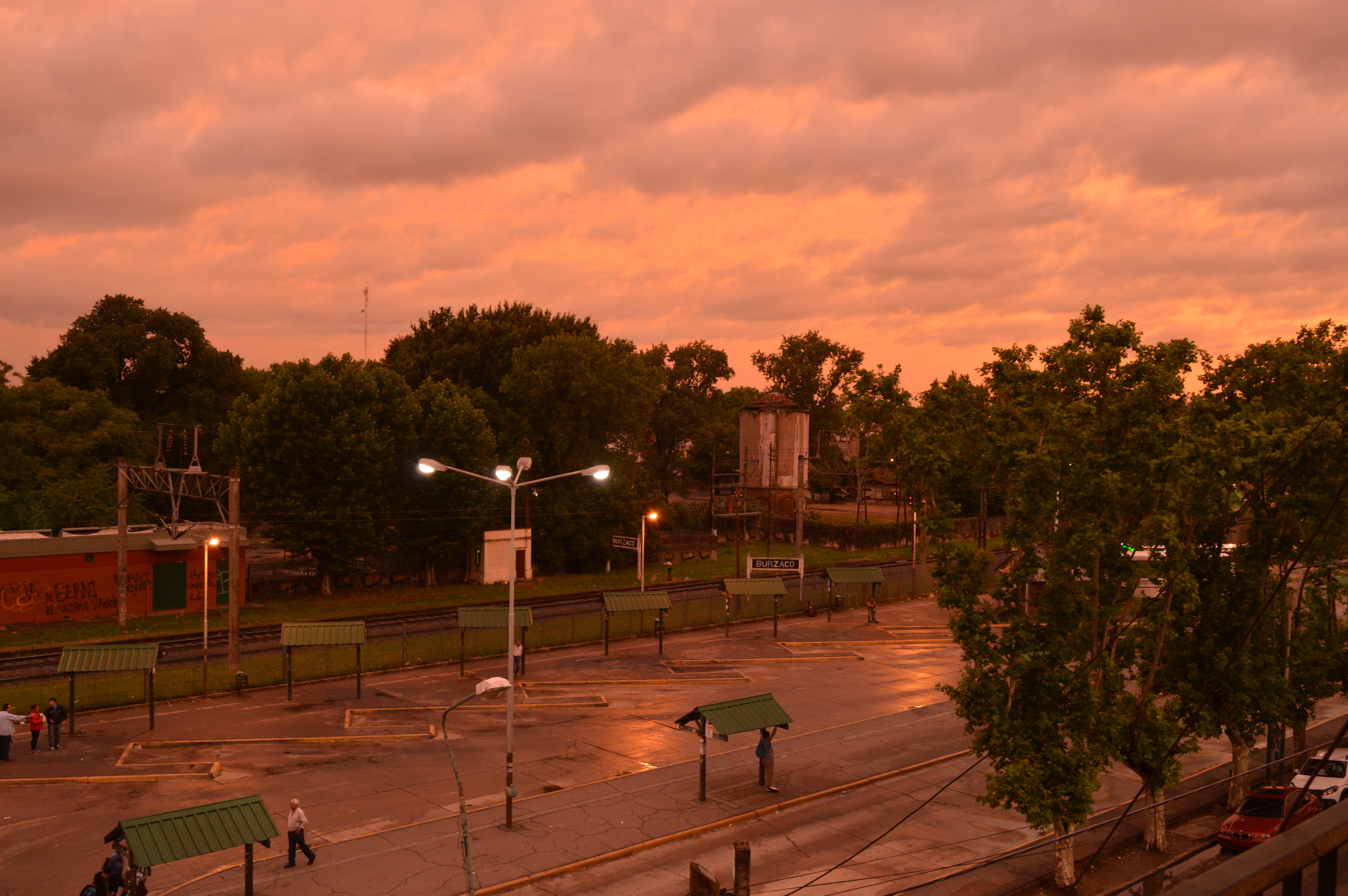

- Location in Greater Buenos Aires
- Coordinates: 34°49′S 58°22′W
- Country: Argentina
- Province: Buenos Aires
- Partido: Almirante Brown
- Elevation: 25 m (82 ft)

Population (2010 census [INDEC])
  - Total: 98,859
  - Density: 3,781.86/km^{2} (9,795.0/sq mi)
- CPA Base: B 1852
- Area code: +54 11

Burzaco is a city in Almirante Brown Partido, Buenos Aires Province, Argentina. It has an area of 22.77 km^{2}, and a population of 98,859 (2010 census [INDEC]). It is 27 kilometres from Buenos Aires city, to which it is linked by the Ferrocarril General Roca South. Although there were some farms in the area at least since the end of the 18th century, Burzaco was first established as a town soon after the arrival of the railway in 1865. The current city is the site of the country's first ever National Flag monument, in Burzaco's main square.

== Notable people ==
- Ramiro Enrique (born 2001) – footballer
- Claudia Piñeiro (born 1960) – novelist and screenwriter
