= Steve Gordon (Cayman Islands cricketer) =

Caymanian cricketer

Personal information
- Full name: Steve Constantine Gordon
- Born: 22 November 1967 (age 58); Jamaica
- Batting: Right-handed
- Bowling: Right-arm medium
- Role: Batsman

Domestic team information
- Years: Team
- 1988–1994: Jamaica
- FC debut: 5 April 1988 Jamaica v Lancashire
- Last FC: 31 August 2005 Cayman Islands v Canada
- LA debut: 11 October 2000 Cayman Islands v Guyana
- Last LA: 17 October 2000 Cayman Islands v Windward Islands

Career statistics
Competition	FC	LA	T20
Matches	4	4	2
Runs scored	138	86	34
Batting average	19.71	28.66	17.00
100s/50s	0/1	0/1	0/0
Top score	65	56*	18
Catches/stumpings	3/–	1/–	1/–
- Source: CricketArchive, 9 September 2007

Steve Constantine Gordon (born 22 November 1967) is a Cayman Islands cricket coach and former player. A right-handed batsman and right-arm medium-pace bowler, he debuted for the Cayman Islands national cricket team in 2000, having previously represented Jamaica.

== Jamaica career ==
Steve Gordon first played cricket for his native Jamaica in April 1988, playing a first-class match against Lancashire. He played just one more game for Jamaica, another first-class match, this time against the Windward Islands in February 1994.

== Caymans career ==
He first played for the Cayman Islands in August 2000, making his debut against the USA at the Maple Leaf Cricket Club in the ICC Americas Championship. He made his List A debut that October, playing for the Cayman Islands against Guyana, Bermuda, the Leeward Islands and the Windward Islands in Antigua.

He played in the following two Americas Championship tournaments; in 2002, when the Cayman Islands finished as runners-up, and in 2004, when the Caymans finished fourth. He next played for the Cayman Islands in February 2005 when he played in the repêchage tournament for the 2005 ICC Trophy in Kuala Lumpur with the Caymans finishing in 5th place after beating Kuwait in a play-off.

He returned to first-class cricket in August 2005, playing two matches for the Cayman Islands in the 2005 ICC Intercontinental Cup at the Toronto Cricket, Skating and Curling Club against Bermuda and Canada. In July the following year, he played in the inaugural Stanford 20/20 tournament, playing two matches against the Bahamas and Trinidad & Tobago before the Cayman Islands were knocked out. He played in the Americas Championship the following month, winning the man of the match award against Canada as the Caymans finished fourth ahead of Argentina.

He most recently played for the Cayman Islands in Division Three of the World Cricket League in Darwin, Australia, with the Cayman Islands finishing fourth after losing a play-off to Papua New Guinea.

== Coaching career ==
Gordon was appointed head coach of Cayman Islands for the 2023 ICC T20 World Cup Americas Sub-Regional Qualifier in Argentina.
