= Kenneth Kamyuka =

Ugandan-born Canadian cricketer (born 1981)

Personal information
- Born: 5 December 1981 (age 44); Jinja, Uganda
- Batting: Right handed
- Bowling: Right arm fast medium

International information
- National sides: Uganda; Canada
- ODI debut (cap 85): 27–28 August 2013; Canada v Netherlands
- Last ODI: 29 August 2013; Canada v Netherlands

Career statistics
Competition	ODI	FC	LA
Matches	2	4	22
Runs scored	2	84	586
Batting average	2.00	14.00	39.06
100s/50s	0/0	0/0	1/4
Top score	2	40	126*
Balls bowled	47	762	1,058
Wickets	4	21	30
Bowling average	11.75	17.52	26.86
5 wickets in innings	0	1	0
10 wickets in match	0	0	0
Best bowling	4/38	5/83	4/38
Catches/stumpings	0/–	0/–	6/–
- Source: Cricinfo, 19 January 2022

Kenneth Kamyuka (born December 5, 1981) is a Ugandan and Canadian cricketer. He is an all-rounder who bats right-handed and bowls right-arm fast-medium.

Kamyuka was born in Uganda and starred for their national team in the 2001 ICC Trophy. A clean hitter of the ball, he scored an unbeaten 100 batting at No 10 against Malaysia.

He later moved to Canada and after waiting four years to qualify to play for his adopted country, Kamyuka made his One Day International (ODI) debut in 2013, against the Netherlands. He took a wicket with his first ball in ODI cricket.
