= Cayman Islands national cricket team =

Cayman Islands
- Association: Cayman Islands Cricket Association

Personnel
- Captain: Ramon Sealy
- Coach: Steve Gordon

History
- First-class debut: v Bermuda at Toronto, Canada; 27 August 2005
- List A debut: v Guyana at The Valley, Anguilla; 11 October 2000
- Twenty20 debut: v Bahamas at King City, Canada; 11 July 2006

International Cricket Council
- ICC status: Affiliate member (1997); Associate member (2002)
- ICC region: Americas
ICC Rankings	Current	Best-ever
T20I	38th	38th (12 May 2022)

International cricket
- First international: v United States at King City, Canada; 7 August 2000

T20 Internationals
- First T20I: v Canada at White Hill Field, Sandys Parish; 18 August 2019
- Last T20I: v Bermuda at Jimmy Powell Oval, George Town; 27 September 2026
T20Is	Played	Won/Lost
Total	52	28/23 (0 ties, 1 no result)
This year	11	8/2 (0 ties, 1 no result)
- T20 World Cup Qualifier appearances: 2 (Note: T20 World Cup Qualifier refers to the Regional Final of the ICC Americas region from the 2023 edition.) (first in 2023)
- Best result: 3rd place (2023, 2025)
T20I kit
- As of 27 September 2026

The Cayman Islands national cricket team is the team that represents the British overseas territory of the Cayman Islands in international cricket. The team is organised by the Cayman Islands Cricket Association, which has been an associate member of the International Cricket Council (ICC) since 2002, having previously been an affiliate member since 1997.

The Cayman Islands debuted internationally at the 2000 Americas Cricket Cup in Canada, and later that year were invited to appear in the 2000–01 Red Stripe Bowl (the West Indian domestic limited-overs competition), where matches had list-A status. During the early 2000s, the Caymans often competed with Bermuda as the third-best team in the ICC Americas region, behind Canada and the United States. When the U.S. was suspended from the 2005 Intercontinental Cup, they were replaced by the Cayman Islands, with the team being afforded the opportunity to make its first-class debut.

In 2006 and 2008, the Cayman Islands played in the Stanford 20/20 tournament (where matches had full Twenty20 status). In the World Cricket League (WCL), Cayman Islands debuted in Division Three in 2007 but subsequently fell as low as Division Six before the WCL was abolished. The Caymans currently play in ICC Americas regional qualification tournaments.

In April 2018, the ICC decided to grant full Twenty20 International (T20I) status to all its members. Therefore, all Twenty20 matches played between the Cayman Islands and any other ICC member after 1 January 2019 are eligible for T20I status.

== History ==
The Cayman Islands became an affiliate member of the ICC in 1997 and played their first tournament three years later when they played in the ICC Americas Championship in Canada. They finished fourth in the tournament, their only win coming against Argentina. Later in the year, they played their first List A matches as part of the 2000–01 Red Stripe Bowl in the West Indies. They played against Bermuda, Guyana, the Leeward Islands and the Windward Islands in the first round, losing all their games.

The Cayman Islands gained associate membership of the ICC in 2002, a year in which they finished third in the Americas Championship in Buenos Aires, Argentina after recording wins against Argentina, the Bahamas and Bermuda. The 2004 Americas Championship served as a qualifying competition for the 2005 ICC Trophy, and a repeat of their third-place finish from 2002 would have qualified them for that tournament. Wins against Argentina and the Bahamas meant they could only finish fourth however. This did qualify them for a place in a repêchage tournament in early 2005 in Kuala Lumpur, Malaysia. They finished fifth in that tournament after beating Kuwait in a play-off match.

Later in 2005, the Cayman Islands took part in the ICC Intercontinental Cup, a tournament for ICC associate members with first-class status. They lost both their first round matches to Bermuda and Canada, thus not qualifying for the semi-finals. In 2006, they first played in the inaugural Stanford 20/20 tournament. They beat the Bahamas in the preliminary round, but lost to Trinidad & Tobago in the first round proper.

In August 2006, they finished third in Division One of the ICC Americas Championship after wins against Argentina and Canada. This qualified them for 2007 Division Three of the World Cricket League, which was played in May/June 2007 in Darwin, Australia. After beating Hong Kong and Tanzania in the first round, they lost to Argentina in the semi-finals, and to Papua New Guinea in the third place play-off, thus finishing fourth in the tournament. In 2009 they again placed in 2009 Division Three in which they came 5th thus relegating to Division Four. Like Argentina their bad run continued and again finished fifth only winning over Argentina. In 2012, they managed to stop the fall, finishing fourth in 2012 Division Five.

=== 2018-Present ===
In April 2018, the ICC decided to grant full Twenty20 International (T20I) status to all its members. Therefore, all Twenty20 matches played between Cayman Islands and other ICC members from 1 January 2019 have been full T20I matches.

The Cayman Islands played their first T20I match against Canada on 18 August 2019, after finishing second in the Southern sub region qualification group and advancing to the Regional Final of the 2018–19 ICC World Twenty20 Americas Qualifier tournament.

18 August 2019
15:30
Scorecard

Canada; 196/6 (20 overs)	v	Cayman Islands; 112/7 (20 overs)
Ravinderpal Singh 101 (48); Paul Manning 2/3 (1 over)		Gregory Strydom 49 (34); Romesh Eranga 3/19 (4 overs)

Canada won by 84 runs
White Hill Field, Sandys Parish
Umpires: Emmerson Carrington (Ber) and Jacqueline Williams (WI)
Player of the match: Ravinderpal Singh (Can)

- Canada won the toss and elected to bat.
- First ever T20I match for Cayman Islands.

== Tournament history ==
Legend

- Champions
- Runners-up
- Third place/Semi-finals
- Tournament hosted by Italy
- Q Qualified
- DNQ Did not qualify
- A Advanced to the next stage
- ▲ Promoted
- Remained in the same division
- ▼ Relegated

=== T20 World Cup Americas Regional Final ===
T20 World Cup Americas Regional Final (Note: Regional Final of the ICC Americas region is the final stage of qualification for T20 World Cup from 2023 edition.) records
Year	Round	Position	GP	W	L	T	NR
(Bermuda) 2019	Round-robin	4/4	6	0	6	0	0
(Antigua and Barbuda) 2021	Did not participate						
(Bermuda) 2023	Round-robin	3/4	6	1	3	0	2
(Canada) 2025	Round-robin	3/4	6	3	3	0	0
Total	0 Titles	3/4	18	4	12	0	2

=== T20 Americas Sub-regional Qualifiers ===
T20 World Cup Americas Sub-regional Qualifiers records
Host/Year	Round	Position	GP	W	L	T	NR
(Argentina) 2018	Runners-up (A)	2/3	4	3	1	0	0
(Argentina) 2023	Runners-up (A)	2/5	4	3	1	0	0
(Argentina) 2024	Runners-up (A)	2/9	8	6	2	0	0
(Cayman Islands) 2026	Champions (A)	1/4	6	6	0	0	0
Total	1 Title	4/4	22	18	4	0	0

=== North American Cup ===
North American Cup records
Year	Round	Position	GP	W	L	T	NR
(Cayman Islands) 2025	Semi-finals	4/5	5	1	4	0	0
(Cayman Islands) 2026	Qualified						
Total	0 Titles	2/2	5	1	4	0	0

=== World Cricket League ===
World Cricket League records
Host/Year	Division	Round	Position	GP	W	L	T	NR
(Australia) 2007	Division Three	Group stage	4/8	5	2	3	0	0
(Argentina) 2009	Division Three	Round-robin (▼)	5/6	5	1	4	0	0
(Italy) 2010	Division Four	Round-robin (▼)	5/6	6	2	4	0	0
(Singapore) 2012	Division Five	Round-robin	4/6	6	2	4	0	0
(Malaysia) 2014	Division Five	Round-robin (▼)	6/6	6	1	5	0	0
(England) 2015	Division Six	Round-robin (▼)	7/8	3	0	3	0	0
(South Africa) 2017	Division Five	Round-robin	8/8	5	0	5	0	0
Total		0 Titles	7 apps.	36	8	28	0	0

=== Other tournaments ===
Intercontinental Cup	ICC Americas Championship	ICC Americas Twenty20 Division One
2004: Did not participate; 2005: 3rd place; 2006–2010: Did not participate	2000: 4th place; 2002: 3rd place; 2004: 3rd place	2006: 4th place; 2008: 3rd place; 2010: 4th place

== Records ==
International Match Summary — Cayman Islands

Last updated 27 September 2026

Playing Record
Format	M	W	L	T	NR	Inaugural Match
Twenty20 Internationals	52	28	23	0	1	18 August 2019

=== Twenty20 International ===
- Highest team total: 224/1 v Brazil on 14 December 2024 at Club San Albano, Burzaco
- Highest individual score: 150*, Sacha de Alwis v Brazil on 14 December 2024 at Club San Albano, Burzaco
- Best individual bowling figures: 5/16, Romario Edwards v Mexico on 9 March 2026 at Jimmy Powell Oval, George Town

Most T20I runs for Cayman Islands

Player	Runs	Average	Career span
Jermaine Baker	1,171	43.37	2024–2026
Sacha De Alwis	766	34.81	2022–2026
Ramon Sealy	723	21.90	2019–2026
Akshay Naidoo	545	24.77	2023–2026
Sam Foster	249	16.60	2024–2026

Most T20I wickets for Cayman Islands

Player	Wickets	Average	Career span
Conroy Wright	39	19.79	2019–2026
Alistair Ifill	36	17.19	2019–2026
Alessandro Morris	35	16.22	2019–2026
Adrian Wright	33	16.54	2023–2026
Troy Taylor	25	20.12	2019–2025

T20I record versus other nations

Records complete to T20I #4151. Last updated 27 September 2026.

Opponent	M	W	L	T	NR	First match	First win
vs Associate Members
Argentina	4	4	0	0	0	4 March 2023	4 March 2023
Bahamas	13	12	0	0	1	13 April 2022	13 April 2022
Belize	1	1	0	0	0	8 December 2024	8 December 2024
Bermuda	12	2	10	0	0	21 August 2019	21 June 2025
Brazil	1	1	0	0	0	14 December 2024	14 December 2024
Canada	9	0	9	0	0	18 August 2019	
Mexico	3	3	0	0	0	11 December 2024	11 December 2024
Panama	3	3	0	0	0	2 March 2023	2 March 2023
Suriname	3	2	1	0	0	10 December 2024	11 March 2026
United States	3	0	3	0	0	19 August 2019	

=== Other results ===
For a list of selected international matches played by Cayman Islands, see Cricket Archive.3

== Current squad ==
Updated as on 15 June 2025

This lists all the active players who played for Cayman Islands in the recently concluded 2025 Men's T20 World Cup Americas Regional Final.

Name	Age	Batting style	Bowling style	Last T20I	Note(s)
Batters
Sacha de Alwis	34	Left-handed	Slow left-arm orthodox	(Canada) 2025	
Brian Corbin	47	Right-handed	—N/a	(The Bahamas) 2025	
Ronald Ebanks	43	Right-handed	Right-arm medium, Right-arm off break	(Bermuda) 2025	
Sam Foster	37	Right-handed	Slow left-arm orthodox	(The Bahamas) 2025	
Akshay Naidoo	37	Right-handed	Right-arm off break	(The Bahamas) 2025	
Sunil	43	Right-handed	—N/a	(Canada) 2025	
Rickel Walker	36	Right-handed	—N/a	(The Bahamas) 2025	
All-rounders
Conroy Wright	41	Right-handed	Right-arm medium	(Canada) 2025	Captain
Ramon Sealy	35	Right-handed	leg break	(The Bahamas) 2025	Vice-captain
Anubhav Dhar	38	Left-handed	Legbreak googly	(The Bahamas) 2025	
Wicket-keeper
Jermaine Baker	33	Right-handed	—N/a	(The Bahamas) 2025	
Pace bowlers
Kevon Bazil	44	Right-handed	Right-arm medium	(The Bahamas) 2025	
Romeo Dunka	36	Left-handed	Left-arm medium	(The Bahamas) 2025	
Troy Taylor	42	Right-handed	Right-arm medium-fast	(Canada) 2025	
Spin bowlers
Alessandro Morris	44	Right-handed	Right-arm off break	(The Bahamas) 2025	
Adrian Wright	37	Right-handed	Right-arm off break	(The Bahamas) 2025	

== Other records ==
Performance by Cayman Island cricketers in World Cricket League matches

Current Players
Name	Matches	Runs	Wickets
Ramon Sealy	24	344	0
Conroy Wright	18	322	26
Omar Willis	12	173	1
Alessandro Morris	22	134	17
Ainsley Hall	20	416	0
Ronald Ebanks	16	208	9
Darren Cato	4	60	0
Omar Bryan	3	40	1
Kervin Ebanks	17	117	9
Ricardo Roach	12	117	2
Troy Taylor	6	42	12
Ian Rotsey	4	14	0
Steve Gordon	18	435	0
Nicholas Sellars	3	7	0

Former Players
Name	Matches	Runs	Wickets
Pearson Best	19	345	0
Abali Hoilett	9	69	0
Ryan Bovell	23	305	38
Alistair Ifill	5	14	0
Kevin Bazil	18	61	8
Marlon Bryan	6	4	7
Saheed Mohamed	17	294	14
Paul Chin	2	24	0
Jalon Linton	3	13	0
Keneil Irving	10	108	0
Kenute Tulloch	11	30	11
Franklyn Hinds	5	19	10
Michael Wight	5	11	4
Joseph Kirkconnell	2	5	0
Ryan Ebanks	5	5	0

Highest scores

Steve Gordon – 104* vs Tanzania at Tracy Village Oval, Darwin on 27 May 2007

Ainsley Hall – 100* vs Tanzania at Tracy Village Oval, Darwin on 27 May 2007

Pearson Best – 85 vs Italy at Centro Sportivo Ca'Nova, Medicina on 19 August 2010

Conroy Wright – 79* vs Jersey at Bayuemas Oval, Kuala Lumpur on 10 March 2014

Pearson Best – 79 vs Guernsey at The Padang, Singapore on 25 February 2012

Best Bowling figures

Ryan Bovell – 5/9 vs Argentina at Indian Assoc. Ground, Singapore on 22 February 2012

Kervin Ebanks – 5/19 vs Guernsey at Royal Selangor Club, Kuala Lumpur on 6 March 2014

Franklyn Hinds – 4/22 vs Hong Kong at Tracy Village Oval, Darwin on 28 May 2007

Michael Wight – 4/30 vs Uganda at Marrara Oval, Darwin on 30 May 2007

Ryan Bovell – 4/35 vs Papua New Guinea at Belgrano ACG, Buenos Aires on 24 January 2009

=== Other players ===
In addition to those listed above, the following Cayman Islands cricketers have played first-class, List A or official Twenty20 cricket:

- Marc Chin
- Steadman Gray
- Charles Greaves
- Abali Hoilett
- Carley James
- Oscar Owen
- Christopher Wight
- David Wight
- Philip Wight
- Conroy Wright

== See also ==
- Cayman Islands women's national cricket team
- Cricket in the Cayman Islands
- List of Cayman Islands Twenty20 International cricketers
