= Toronto Cricket, Skating and Curling Club =

Sporting club in Toronto, Canada

Toronto Cricket Skating and Curling Club
- Abbreviation: TCSCC
- Founded: 1827; 199 years ago (as the Toronto Cricket Club)
- Type: Sport and Social Club
- Location(s): 141 Wilson Avenue; Toronto, Ontario, Canada
- Coordinates: 43.7399°N 79.41902°W
- Website: torontocricketclub.com

The Toronto Cricket Skating and Curling Club is a private sport and social club located in Toronto, Ontario, Canada. The club has facilities for sports including aquatics, cricket, croquet, curling, figure skating, fitness classes, lawn bowling, squash and tennis.

== Athletics ==
Cricket is the oldest sport offered by the club, dating back to the club's founding in 1827. The club currently enters teams in leagues run by the Toronto & District Cricket Association (TDCA), and plays home matches at the Toronto Cricket, Skating and Curling Club Ground.

The club's figure skating programme is run by Olympic skaters Brian Orser and Tracy Wilson. They have coached many elite-level skaters to national, international, world and Olympic titles including Yuna Kim (2009 & 2013 World Champion, 2010 Olympic Champion, 2014 Olympic Silver medallist), Gabrielle Daleman (2018 Olympic Team Gold medallist and 2017 World bronze medallist), Evgenia Medvedeva (2018 double Olympic Silver medallist, 2016 & 2017 World Champion), Yuzuru Hanyu (2014 & 2017 World Champion and 2014 & 2018 Olympic Champion) and Javier Fernandez (2015 & 2016 World Champion and 2018 Olympic Bronze medallist).

As well as cricket, skating, and curling, the Toronto Cricket Skating and Curling Club also hosts other sports, including Aquatics, Croquet, Fitness, Lawn Bowling, Squash, and tennis.
