= 2005 ICC Intercontinental Cup =

International cricket tournament

- Dates: 22 April – 29 October
- Administrator: International Cricket Council
- Cricket format: First-class cricket
- Tournament format(s): Round-robin and Knockout
- Champions: Ireland (1st title)
- Runners-up: Kenya
- Participants: 12
- Most runs: (Kenya) Steve Tikolo (751)
- Most wickets: (Bermuda) Dwayne Leverock (18)

The 2005 ICC Intercontinental Cup was the second edition of the ICC Intercontinental Cup, a cricket competition for (then) 12 nations from Asia, Africa, North America and Europe. All the games were scheduled for three days and were designated first class.

Each team in the four groups played every other team in their group once. The winners of each group progressed to a semi-final from 23 to 25 October, and then a final from 27 to 29 October, hosted by Namibia. The groups were as follows:

- Africa: Kenya, Namibia, Uganda (won by Kenya)
- Asia: Hong Kong, Nepal, United Arab Emirates (won by the United Arab Emirates)
- Europe: Netherlands, Ireland, Scotland (won by Ireland)
- N America: Bermuda, Canada, Cayman Islands (won by Bermuda)

The United States were going to compete in the North American group, but were expelled from the competition by the ICC because of ongoing political problems within cricket in the US.

The tournament was won by Ireland who defeated Kenya in the final.

== Playing conditions ==
The competition was run by the International Cricket Council to support the development of the longer form of the game in 12 of its associate members. The points system had been determined so as to encourage positive play. For instance, there were 14 points for a win, and the first innings was restricted to 90 overs, which can encourage attacking play as a team approaches the 90 over mark. In the event of a tie (i.e. all wickets down in the last innings with the scores being equal) each side was awarded 7 points.

Bonus points for batting were available for every 25 runs scored. There was no limit to how many points can be scored in the first innings, but batting points were restricted to 4 points (300 runs) in the second. 0.5 points were available for every wicket taken.

== Group stage ==
=== Africa Group ===
Team	P	W	L	D	Points	Qualification
Kenya	2	1	0	1	49	Semi-finals
Namibia	2	1	0	1	46.5	Eliminated
Uganda	2	0	2	0	32	Eliminated

==== 22–24 April: Kenya v Uganda ====
22–24 April 2005
Scorecard

Kenya	v	Uganda
321 (87.2 overs); Steve Tikolo 149 (211); Charles Waiswa 4/58 (17.2 overs)		168 (72.2 overs); Laurence Sematimba 57 (132); Thomas Odoyo 5/34 (16 overs)
116 (46.1 overs); Steve Tikolo 54 (90); Charles Waiswa 3/26 (10.1 overs)		108 (44 overs); Joel Olwenyi 35 (62); Lameck Onyango 6/21 (12 overs)

Kenya won by 161 runs
Lugogo Stadium, Kampala, Kenya
Umpires: Mike Gajjar (SA) and E.C. Hendrickse (SA)
Player of the match: Steve Tikolo (Kenya)

- Kenya won the toss and elected to bat
- Points earned: Kenya (32), Uganda (15)

==== 13–15 May: Namibia v Uganda ====
13–15 May 2005
Scorecard

Uganda	v	Namibia
231 (66.4 overs); Frank Nsubuga 64 (49); Gerrie Snyman 3/45 (11 overs)		201 (80.4 overs); Jan-Berrie Burger 59 (142); Emmanuel Isaneez 3/40 (14 overs)
211/9d (82 overs); Junior Kwebiha 39 (86); Jan-Berrie Burger 3/46 (17 overs)		242/7 (48.2 overs); Jan-Berrie Burger 67 (118); Kenneth Kamyuka 4/41 (12.2 overs)

Namibia won by 3 wickets
Lugogo Stadium, Kampala, Kenya
Umpires: David Odhiambo (KEN) and Subhash Modi (KEN)
Player of the match: Gerrie Snyman (Namibia)

- Uganda won the toss and elected to bat
- Points earned: Namibia (31.5), Uganda (17)

==== 3–5 June: Kenya v Namibia ====
3–5 June 2005
Scorecard

Kenya	v	Namibia
300/6d (88.4 overs); Steve Tikolo 86 (118); Kola Burger 3/35 (18 overs)		335/9d (87 overs); Louis Burger 87 (158); Lameck Onyango 3/61 (15 overs)
282/9d (109 overs); Martin Suji 72* (190); Deon Kotze 2/46 (17 overs)		68/5 (19 overs); Stephan Swanepoel 29 (45); Steve Tikolo 2/8 (2 overs)

Match drawn
Wanderers Cricket Ground, Windhoek, Namibia
Umpires: David Odhiambo (KEN) and Subhash Modi (KEN)
Player of the match: Martin Suji (Kenya)

- Namibia won the toss and elected to bat
- Points earned: Kenya (17), Namibia (15)

=== Asia Group ===
Team	P	W	L	D	Points
United Arab Emirates	2	1	1	0	41
Nepal	2	1	0	1	40.5
Hong Kong	2	0	1	1	18

24–26 April: United Arab Emirates (30pts) beat Hong Kong (12.5pts) by 7 wickets

Hong Kong, making their ICC Intercontinental Cup debut, showed their inexperience in Sharjah. The first day saw them dismissed for 127, with the UAE moving to 126 for 7 by close. They only added onto their score on the second day, to leave the game as a tie on first innings. Hong Kong were then dismissed cheaply again, this time for 184, and then let the UAE move to 144 for 3 at close. The game ended early on the third day, with no more wickets falling. The UAE had taken only 46 overs to knock off the runs.

30 April-2 May: Nepal (8.5pts) drew with Hong Kong (5.5pts)

In Kathmandu, the first day was abandoned without a ball being bowled. The second day was also severely hampered by rain, but there was time for the Nepalis to bowl Hong Kong out for 91 after putting them into bat. The third and final day allowed for 54 overs, in which Nepal scored 101 for 7 declared and Hong Kong moved to 37 for 3 as Nepal tried to pick up as many points as possible before their group decider with the United Arab Emirates.

7–9 May: Nepal (32pts) beat the United Arab Emirates (11pts) by 172 runs

Nepal won the toss in Kathmandu and batted first. After losing two quick wickets they consolidated and finished a rain-affected first day on 246 for 5. On day two they declared on 287 for 7. Nepal's bowlers then performed well, dismissing the United Arab Emirates for 164, with Arshad Ali carrying his bat for 81. In reply, Nepal proceeded to 45 for 2 by stumps on the second day. On the third and final day, Nepal declared on 125 for 6. Binod Das then took 5 for 27 to help dismiss the Emiratis for 76.

And so, despite Nepal clearly showing their dominance in the group they do not progress to the next round. Nepal thrashed UAE and were well on top against Hong Kong but, because their game against Hong Kong was ravaged by rain, they do not progress to the semi-finals in Namibia. Whether the ICC will change the points system because of this is yet to be seen.

=== Europe Group ===
Team	P	W	L	D	Points
Ireland	2	1	0	1	41
Scotland	2	0	1	1	21
Netherlands	2	0	0	2	11.5

29–31 July: Netherlands (5.5pts) drew with Scotland (4pts)

The Scots went into this tournament as favourites, being holders of the Intercontinental Cup and the ICC Trophy. However, rain in Utrecht prevented them from a good start against the Dutch, who bowled well enough to have them all out for 217 on the first day. Ian Stanger hit his second first-class fifty and Ryan Watson 46, but South African-born Ryan ten Doeschate took three important, albeit expensive, wickets and medium-pacer Edgar Schiferli finished with four for 46. In reply, Maurits van Nierop lashed out, taking 24 off the Scottish bowlers as the Dutch made 31 for 0 to see them to stumps on day 1. Play was impossible on the next two days, and the Scots now needed to thump Ireland in Aberdeen if they were to have any hope of qualifying for the semi-finals.

13–15 August: Ireland (30.5pts) beat Scotland (17pts) by three runs

The start of the match at Aberdeen was delayed due to rain, but when it did get underway, Ireland immediately got into trouble. The first two partnerships didn't add a single run, four batsmen departed for ducks, and Craig Wright got four wickets for the hosting Scots. Ireland crumbled to 128 for 9 before 17-year-old Greg Thompson from Lisburn hit 35 from number 10 to become the top scorer of the innings. Steven Knox hit 38 for the Scots, however, as they moved to 104 for 2. Tight bowling frustrated the Scots, who were looking for quick runs, but at least Cedric English hit 66 to lift them to 234 – a lead of 62. Ryan Watson and Dewald Nel got a wicket each before stumps, the Irish second innings score 46 for 2. Dominic Joyce, brother of more famous Ed, came to the crease as the new batsman on the third morning, and he scored 61 before being lbw to Dewald Nel – a crucial innings. The rest of the batsmen stuck in, defending against Paul Hoffmann, who bowled 18 overs for 33 runs, but only got the one wicket.

The Scots – needing a victory after the wash-out in Utrecht against the Dutch – went after the target. But the former Essex bowler, Adrian McCoubrey, took four for 17 as the Scots crashed to 34 for four, and despite 31 not out from Craig Wright, his two last partners were both run out, and Scotland finished on 131 – four runs short of victory. Thus, the finalists of the last tournament were knocked out before the last game.

23–25 August: Ireland (11pts) drew with Netherlands (6pts)

The first day of the match at Stormont, Belfast was rained off, and Ireland, knowing that plenty of runs would give them enough to see them through to the semi-finals, chose to bat out 90 overs. The entire top order contributed with half-centuries and centuries – Jeremy Bray top scoring 135 – as the Dutch bowlers were slaughtered, debutant Ernst van Giezen taking two for 107 as the best bowler. Ireland declared on 407 for 4, having realised they could get no more points, and immediately dug into the Dutch top order. A recovery was staged thanks to a 115-run stand between Ryan ten Doeschate and Alexei Kervezee, but when Andre Botha took two wickets the Dutch realised the futility of their task. The match was eventually abandoned as a draw, which sent Ireland into the semi-finals of the tournament.

=== Americas Group ===
Team	P	W	L	D	Points
Bermuda	2	2	0	0	62
Canada	2	1	1	0	51
Cayman Islands	2	0	2	0	23

23–25 August: Bermuda (30.5pts) beat Canada (17.5pts) by 48 runs

Bermuda pulled off a narrow victory over Canada in Toronto to leave them favourites to win the Americas group. Canada won the toss and put Bermuda into bat, a decision that was soon vindicated as their guests were skittled for 125 in 59.5 overs, with only Clay Smith (52) and Janeiro Tucker (25) putting up any sort of resistance. The damage was done by Canada's 21-year-old left-arm medium pace bowler, Umar Bhatti, who got 8 for 40. By the end of the first day, Canada had already overhauled this total, and were on 149 for 6. The innings closed on the second day at 207, of which 76 were made by Ashish Bagai. Bermuda did better in their second innings, mostly due to Tucker's 123 that helped swing the game. By the time they had finished their innings they had 311 on the board and a defendable lead of 229. Early wickets saw the hosts collapse to 17 for 4 before a recovery took them to 164 for 6. A final push by Bermuda saw them all out for 181, and put the Bermudians in control of the group: a win in their next game would see them in the semi-finals. Scorecard

27–29 August: Bermuda (31.5pts) beat Cayman Islands (8.5pts) by an innings and 105 runs

Cayman Islands got off to a good start in their first Intercontinental Cup match in their history – indeed, their inaugural first class match. Amid rains at Toronto, they made their way to 109 for 1, before Bermudian off spinner Dwayne Leverock unleashed himself on the Cayman batting line-up. In 27 overs he took five for 56, playing a major part in dismissing the Caymans for 197 just before rain stopped play on day one. On day two, however, Bermuda took over, with captain Clay Smith making 138 and Irving Romaine scoring 111 as the team raced to 387 for 7. Kevin Hurdle then took two wickets in five expensive overs as the Caymans were 50 for 4 at the second day's close of play. It took 14 overs for Leverock and Bermuda to wrap up the Cayman innings for 85, thus taking 31.5 points and assuring themselves of a semi-final spot. Leverock finished with match figures of eleven for 72, the best figures in the tournament so far this year.

31 August-2 September: Canada (33.5pts) beat Cayman Islands (14.5pts) by 120 runs

Canada dominated proceedings at Toronto, getting the win but not getting enough points to qualify for the semi-finals. Batting first, they made 340, with Dean Maxwell recording a maiden first class century despite retiring hurt on 58. He returned when Umar Bhatti was dismissed and the score was 241 for 7, adding a further 56 before falling to Ronald Ebanks, and Canada declared without sending in number 11 Henry Osinde. The fast bowler menaced the Cayman batting line-up, however, taking seven for 53 as the Caymans were bowled out for 159, before quick runs from Qaiser Ali and Ashish Bagai gave Canada a 332-run lead before declaring again. Kevin Sandher and Sunil Dhaniram then took care of the Caymans' batting, bowling them out shortly before tea on day three, with 41-year-old Pearson Best scoring 53 as the Caymans managed an all-time high score of 212.

== Knockout stages ==
Namibia was elected to host the knockout stages of the Intercontinental Cup on 5 April 2005.

=== Semi-finals ===
23–25 October
Scorecard

Kenya	v	Bermuda
403/6d (89.5 overs); Steve Tikolo 220 (233); Saleem Mukuddem 1/38 (11 overs)		346/9d (90 overs); Clay Smith 126* (175); Thomas Odoyo 3/22 (11 overs)
282/4 (110.2 overs); Tony Suji 103* (341); Ryan Steede 2/32 (11 overs)

Match drawn
United Ground, Windhoek, Namibia
Umpires: Paul Baldwin (Ger) and Tony Hill (NZ)
Player of the match: Steve Tikolo (Ken)

- Kenya won the toss and elected to bat.
- Points: Kenya 16.5, Bermuda 11.5. Kenya therefore progressed to the final.

23–25 October
Scorecard

Ireland	v	United Arab Emirates
350/7d (87.4 overs); Eoin Morgan 151 (150); Ali Asad 5/93 (28 overs)		189 (51.1 overs); Mohammad Taskeen 47 (79); Trent Johnston 5/33 (10.1 overs)
444/4d (104.1 overs); Jeremy Bray 190 (251); Vairamoorthy Sockalingam 1/16 (4 overs)		227/8 (79 overs); Usman Saleem 68 (137); Kyle McCallan 3/32 (22 overs)

Match drawn
Wanderers Cricket Ground, Windhoek, Namibia
Umpires: Roger Dill (Ber) and Russell Tiffin (Zim)
Player of the match: Jeremy Bray (Ire)

- Ireland won the toss and elected to bat.
- Points: Ireland 20, United Arab Emirates 13. Ireland therefore progressed to the final.

=== Final ===
27–29 October
Scorecard

Kenya	v	Ireland
401/4d (89.5 overs); Steve Tikolo 177* (170); Trent Johnston 1/43 (11 overs)		313/4d (78.5 overs); Niall O'Brien 106* (153); Thomas Odoyo 1/15 (4.3 overs)
156 (68 overs); Martin Suji 52 (122); Kyle McCallan 4/34 (15 overs)		245/4 (66.5 overs); Jeremy Bray 64 (107); Steve Tikolo 2/71 (23 overs)

Ireland won by 6 wickets
Wanderers Cricket Ground, Windhoek, Namibia
Umpires: Tony Hill (NZ) and Russell Tiffin (Zim)
Player of the match: Kyle McCallan (Ire) and Andrew White (Ire)

- Kenya won the toss and elected to bat.
