= 2000–01 Red Stripe Bowl =

Cricket tournament

- Dates: 11 – 22 October 2000
- Administrator: WICB
- Cricket format: List A (50 overs)
- Tournament format(s): Group stage, finals
- Champions: Windward Islands (2nd title)
- Participants: 10
- Matches: 23
- Player of the series: (Grenada) Junior Murray
- Most runs: (Grenada) Junior Murray (231)
- Most wickets: (Saint Vincent and the Grenadines) Nixon McLean (13)

The 2000–01 Red Stripe Bowl was the 27th season of what is now the Regional Super50, the domestic limited-overs cricket competition for the countries of the West Indies Cricket Board (WICB). It ran from 11 to 22 October 2000.

Ten teams contested the competition – the six regular teams of West Indian domestic cricket (Barbados, Guyana, Jamaica, the Leeward Islands, Trinidad and Tobago, and the Windward Islands), plus four invited international teams from the ICC Americas region (Bermuda, Canada, the Cayman Islands, and the United States). The Cayman Islands team were making their debut in List A cricket. The semi-finals and final of the competition were all held in Jamaica, at Kingston's Sabina Park. The Windward Islands defeated the Leewards in the final to win only their second domestic one-day title. Two players from the Windwards, Junior Murray and Nixon McLean, led the tournament in runs and wickets, respectively, with Murray being named the player of the tournament.

== Squads ==
Barbados	Bermuda	Canada	Cayman Islands	Guyana
Sherwin Campbell (c); Ian Bradshaw; Hendy Bryan; Courtney Browne; Corey Collymore; Adrian Griffith; Ryan Hinds; Ryan Hurley; Callitos Lopez; Dave Marshall; Antonio Mayers; Floyd Reifer; Dale Richards; Philo Wallace	Charlie Marshall (c); Dennis Archer; Herbert Bascombe; Richard Basden; Hasan Durham; Curtis Jackson; Sheridan Ming; Dennis Pilgrim; Clay Smith; Janeiro Tucker; Kwame Tucker; Jermaine Warner; Wendale White	Joseph Harris (c); Ashish Bagai; Desmond Chumney; George Codrington; Melvin Croning; Muneeb Diwan; Nicholas Ifill; Davis Joseph; Damian Mills; Paul Prashad; Brian Rajadurai; Vivian Sailsman; Kevin Sandher; Sanjayan Thuraisingam	Michael Wight (c); Pearson Best; Ryan Bovell; Larry Cunningham; Steve Gordon; Steadman Gray; Charles Greaves; Franklyn Hinds; Carley James; Oscar Owen; Kenute Tulloch; Chris Wight; David Wight; Philip Wight	Neil McGarrell (c); Lennox Cush; Kevin Darlington; Narsingh Deonarine; Travis Dowlin; Andrew Gonsalves; Azeemul Haniff; Carl Hooper; Reon King; Ricardo Mohammed; Mahendra Nagamootoo; Vishal Nagamootoo; Keith Semple; Colin Stuart
Jamaica	Leeward Islands	Trinidad and Tobago	United States	Windward Islands
Jimmy Adams (c); Gareth Breese; Ryan Cunningham; Keith Hibbert; Wavell Hinds; Denville McKenzie; Brian Murphy; Brenton Parchment; Nehemiah Perry; Franklyn Rose; Marlon Samuels; Robert Samuels; Laurie Williams	Ridley Jacobs (c); Keith Arthurton; Colin Cannonier; Ricky Christopher; Wilden Cornwall; Kerry Jeremy; Dave Joseph; Sylvester Joseph; Anthony Lake; Runako Morton; Goldwyn Prince; Carl Tuckett; Stuart Williams	Richard Smith (c); Zaheer Ali; Marlon Black; Darryl Brown; Merv Dillon; Kenneth Hazel; Andy Jackson; Imran Jan; Keno Mason; Hollister Pajotte; Dinanath Ramnarine; Lincoln Roberts; Leon Romero; Rodney Sooklal	Raymond Denny (c); Aijaz Ali; Curtis Baptiste; Niroshan de Silva; Alvin Howard; Mark Johnson; Adrian Jordan; Amjad Khan; Steve Massiah; Rudy Narine; Tony Reid; Richard Staple; Albert Texeira; Dave Wallace	Rawl Lewis (c); Cameron Cuffy; Romel Currency; John Eugene; Dawnley Joseph; Roy Marshall; Nixon McLean; Junior Murray; McNeil Morgan; Kenroy Peters; Wayne Phillip; Shane Shillingford; Devon Smith

== Group stage ==
=== Zone A ===
Team	Pld	W	L	T	NR	Pts	NRR
Barbados	4	3	1	0	0	6	+0.887
Jamaica	4	3	1	0	0	6	+1.016
Trinidad and Tobago	4	2	2	0	0	4	+0.281
Canada	4	1	3	0	0	2	–0.403
United States	4	1	3	0	0	2	–2.102

11 October 2000
Scorecard

Canada; 138 (48.2 overs)	v	Barbados; 139/3 (32.4 overs)

Barbados won by 7 wickets
Kensington Oval, Bridgetown
Player of the match: Floyd Reifer (Bar)

11 October 2000
Scorecard

Jamaica; 264/4 (50 overs)	v	United States; 157/7 (50 overs)

Jamaica won by 107 runs
Kaiser Sports Club, Discovery Bay
Player of the match: Laurie Williams (Jam)

12 October 2000
Scorecard

Barbados; 185 (49.4 overs)	v	Trinidad and Tobago; 118 (43 overs)

Barbados won by 67 runs
Chedwin Park, Spanish Town

12 October 2000
Scorecard

United States; 81 (29.3 overs)	v	Canada; 82/4 (21.3 overs)

Canada won by 6 wickets
Melbourne Park, Kingston

14 October 2000
Scorecard

Barbados; 223/8 (50 overs)	v	Jamaica; 174/8 (50 overs)

Barbados won by 49 runs
Sabina Park, Kingston

15 October 2000
Scorecard

Trinidad and Tobago; 145 (50 overs)	v	Jamaica; 146/1 (37.5 overs)

Jamaica won by 9 wickets
Sabina Park, Kingston
Player of the match: Brenton Parchment (Jam)

16 October 2000
Scorecard

Barbados; 129 (38 overs)	v	United States; 130/8 (49 overs)

United States won by 2 wickets
Sabina Park, Kingston

16 October 2000
Scorecard

Canada; 149 (47.4 overs)	v	Trinidad and Tobago; 151/5 (46 overs)

Trinidad and Tobago won by 5 wickets
Chedwin Park, Spanish Town

17 October 2000
Scorecard

Jamaica; 226 (50 overs)	v	Canada; 135 (46.3 overs)

Jamaica won by 91 runs
Alpart Sports Club Ground, Nain
Player of the match: Keith Hibbert (Jam)

17 October 2000
Scorecard

United States; 62 (35.2 overs)	v	Trinidad and Tobago; 65/1 (5.1 overs)

Trinidad and Tobago won by 9 wickets
Chedwin Park, Spanish Town

=== Zone B ===
Team	Pld	W	L	T	NR	Pts	NRR
Windward Islands	4	3	1	0	0	6	+1.015
Leeward Islands	4	3	1	0	0	6	+0.936
Guyana	4	3	1	0	0	6	+0.486
Bermuda	4	1	3	0	0	2	–0.270
Cayman Islands	4	0	4	0	0	0	–3.290

11 October 2000
Scorecard

Guyana; 224/9 (49 overs)	v	Cayman Islands; 75 (33.5 overs)

Guyana won by 149 runs (D/L)
Ronald Webster Park, The Valley

- Guyana's innings was reduced to 49 overs, Cayman Islands' target was 225 runs in 46 overs.

11 October 2000
Scorecard

Bermuda; 129 (46 overs)	v	Leeward Islands; 133/5 (39.2 overs)

Leeward Islands won by 5 wickets
Antigua Recreation Ground, St. John's
Player of the match: Goldwyn Prince (Lee)

12 October 2000
Scorecard

Bermuda; 250/6 (50 overs)	v	Cayman Islands; 127/7 (50 overs)

Bermuda won by 123 runs
Antigua Recreation Ground, St. John's
Player of the match: Charlie Marshall (Ber)

12 October 2000
Scorecard

Windward Islands; 104 (36.3 overs)	v	Guyana; 107/3 (37 overs)

Guyana won by 7 wickets
Ronald Webster Park, The Valley

14 October 2000
Scorecard

Guyana; 180 (49.1 overs)	v	Leeward Islands; 181/5 (49.2 overs)

Leeward Islands won by 5 wickets
Antigua Recreation Ground, St. John's
Player of the match: Kerry Jeremy (Lee)

14 October 2000
Scorecard

Windward Islands; 252/5 (50 overs)	v	Bermuda; 147 (43.3 overs)

Windward Islands won by 105 runs
Ronald Webster Park, The Valley
Player of the match: Junior Murray (Win)

15 October 2000
Scorecard

Bermuda; 181 (50 overs)	v	Guyana; 183/3 (43.2 overs)

Guyana won by 7 wickets
Antigua Recreation Ground, St. John's

15 October 2000
Scorecard

Leeward Islands; 174 (49.1 overs)	v	Windward Islands; 178/5 (41.3 overs)

Windward Islands won by 5 wickets
Ronald Webster Park, The Valley
Player of the match: Romel Currency (Win)

16 October 2000
Scorecard

Cayman Islands; 91 (42 overs)	v	Leeward Islands; 94/1 (8.3 overs)

Leeward Islands won by 9 wickets
Antigua Recreation Ground, St. John's
Player of the match: Runako Morton (Lee)

17 October 2000
Scorecard

Cayman Islands; 103 (43.1 overs)	v	Windward Islands; 104/4 (24 overs)

Windward Islands won by 6 wickets
Antigua Recreation Ground, St. John's
Player of the match: Roy Marshall (Win)

== Finals ==
=== Semi-finals ===
20 October 2000
Scorecard

Leeward Islands; 169 (49.5 overs)	v	Barbados; 156 (48.4 overs)

Leeward Islands won by 13 runs
Sabina Park, Kingston

21 October 2000
Scorecard

Jamaica; 187/9 (50 overs)	v	Windward Islands; 191/6 (48.2 overs)

Windward Islands won by 4 wickets
Sabina Park, Kingston

=== Final ===
22 October 2000
Scorecard

Leeward Islands; 163/8 (50 overs)	v	Windward Islands; 164/5 (42.5 overs)

Windward Islands won by 5 wickets
Sabina Park, Kingston

== Statistics ==
=== Most runs ===
The top five run scorers (total runs) are included in this table.

Player	Team	Runs	Inns	Avg	Highest	100s	50s
Junior Murray	Windward Islands	231	6	46.20	100*	1	0
Keith Hibbert	Jamaica	198	5	49.50	93*	0	2
Romel Currency	Guyana	194	6	48.50	65*	0	1
Floyd Reifer	Barbados	184	5	36.80	69	0	1
Brenton Parchment	Jamaica	174	5	43.50	58*	0	2

Source: CricketArchive

=== Most wickets ===
The top five wicket takers are listed in this table, listed by wickets taken and then by bowling average.

Player	Team	Overs	Wkts	Ave	SR	Econ	BBI
Nixon McLean	Windward Islands	43.3	13	12.07	20.07	3.60	5/35
Kerry Jeremy	Leeward Islands	55.0	12	15.00	27.50	3.27	6/42
Goldwyn Prince	Leeward Islands	51.4	11	13.63	28.18	2.90	4/22
Roy Marshall	Windward Islands	52.1	11	14.00	28.45	2.95	4/28
Ian Bradshaw	Barbados	35.2	9	10.22	23.55	2.60	3/12

Source: CricketArchive

== See also ==
- 2000–01 Red Stripe Bowl
