= 2000 Americas Cricket Cup =

- Administrator(s): ICC Americas
- Cricket format: 50 overs
- Tournament format(s): Round-robin
- Host(s): Canada
- Champions: Canada (1st title)
- Participants: 5
- Matches: 10
- Player of the series: (Canada) Joseph Harris

The 2000 Americas Cricket Cup was an international cricket tournament held in Canada between 7 and 12 August 2000. It was the inaugural edition of what is now the ICC Americas Championship.

The tournament was contested by the five associate members of the International Cricket Council (ICC) located in the ICC Americas development region – Argentina, Bermuda, Canada, the Cayman Islands, and the United States. It was played as a round-robin, with each participant playing the other once. The home team, Canada, won all four of its matches, with Bermuda runner-up. Canada's captain, Joseph Harris, was the player of the tournament.

== Teams and squads ==
Argentina	Bermuda	Canada	Cayman Islands	United States
Guillermo Kirschbaum (c); Hernan Pereyra (vc); Martin Cortabarria; Murray Davis; Alejandro Ferguson; Donald Forrester; Tomas Francis; Charles Gibson; Bernardo Irigoyen; Diego Lord; Matias Paterlini; Lucas Paterlini; Andres Perez Rivero; Martin Siri; Christian Tuñon	Richard Basden; Lionel Cann; Michael Crane; Curtis Jackson; Charlie Marshall; Steven Outerbridge; Dennis Pilgrim; Oliver Pitcher; Justin Robinson; Clay Smith; Janeiro Tucker; Kwame Tucker; Jermaine Warner; Wendell White	Joseph Harris (c); Paul Prashad (vc); Desmond Chumney; George Codrington; Melvin Croning; John Davison; Nicholas Ifill; Davis Joseph; Damian Mills; Brian Rajadurai; Sukhjinder Rana; Kevin Sandher; Surendra Seeraj; Sanjayan Thuraisingam	Michael Wight (c); Ryan Bovell; Larry Cunningham; Ronald Ebanks; Steve Gordon; Steadman Gray; Franklyn Hinds; Carley James; Joseph Kirkconnell; Oscar Owen; Gary Tulloch; Chris Wight; David Wight; Philip Wight	Raymond Denny (c); Nezam Hafiz (vc); Rohan Alexander; Nirosh DeSilva; Winston Lewis; Steve Mangru; Naseer Islam; Kuldeep Patel; Mihirkumar Patel; Charles Reid; Sunderdat Sookram; Dave Wallace; Waqas Shahid; Zamin Amin

== Points table ==
Team	Pld	W	L	T	Pts	NRR
Canada	4	4	0	0	8	+1.426
Bermuda	4	3	1	0	6	+1.409
United States	4	2	2	0	4	–0.424
Cayman Islands	4	1	3	0	2	–0.535
Argentina	4	0	4	0	0	–1.946

== Fixtures ==
7 August
Scorecard

Bermuda; 346/8 (50 overs)	v	Argentina; 153/9 (49 overs)

Bermuda won by 193 runs
Maple Leaf Cricket Club, King City, Ontario

7 August
Scorecard

Cayman Islands; 137 (43.5 overs)	v	United States; 138/9 (40 overs)

United States won by 1 wicket
Maple Leaf Cricket Club, King City, Ontario

8 August
Scorecard

Cayman Islands; 206/9 (50 overs)	v	Argentina; 78/4 (26 overs)

Cayman Islands won by 30 runs (D/L)
Maple Leaf Cricket Club, King City, Ontario

8 August
Scorecard

Canada; 251/8 (50 overs)	v	United States; 71/5 (27.1 overs)

Canada won by 70 runs (D/L)
Maple Leaf Cricket Club, King City, Ontario

10 August
Scorecard

Argentina; 158/9 (50 overs)	v	Canada; 160/5 (38 overs)

Canada won by 5 wickets
Maple Leaf Cricket Club, King City, Ontario

10 August
Scorecard

Bermuda; 105 (34.3 overs)	v	Cayman Islands; 73 (38.3 overs)

Bermuda won by 32 runs
Maple Leaf Cricket Club, King City, Ontario

11 August
Scorecard

Bermuda; 232 (47.5 overs)	v	United States; 149 (45.1 overs)

Bermuda won by 83 runs
G. Ross Lord Park, Toronto, Ontario

11 August
Scorecard

Canada; 112 (25.3 overs)	v	Cayman Islands; 62 (20.5 overs)

Canada won by 49 runs
G. Ross Lord Park, Toronto, Ontario

12 August
Scorecard

United States; 243 (? overs)	v	Argentina; 202 (? overs)

United States won by 41 runs
G. Ross Lord Park, Toronto, Ontario

12 August
Scorecard

Bermuda; 186 (? overs)	v	Canada; 190/3 (43 overs)

Canada won by 7 wickets
G. Ross Lord Park, Toronto, Ontario
