= 2002 ICC Americas Championship =

- Administrator: Americas Cricket Association
- Cricket format: 50 overs per side
- Tournament format: round robin
- Host: Argentina
- Champions: United States (1st title)
- Participants: 6
- Matches: 15
- Most runs: (United States) Faoud Bacchus 169
- Most wickets: (Cayman Islands) Ryan Bovell 14

The 2002 ICC Americas Championship was a cricket tournament in Argentina, taking place between 12 March and 16 March 2002. It gave six North and South American Associate and Affiliate members of the International Cricket Council experience of international one-day cricket.

== Teams ==
There were 6 teams that played in the tournament. These teams were non-test member nations of the Americas Cricket Association. The teams that played were:

- Argentina
- Bahamas
- Bermuda
- Canada
- Cayman Islands
- United States

== Squads ==
| Argentina | Bahamas | Bermuda |
|---|---|---|
| Gaston Arizaga; Alejandro Ferguson; Pablo Ferguson; Donald Forrester; Tomas Francis; Bernardo Irigoyen; Guillermo Kirschbaum; Diego Lord; Lucas Paterlini; Matias Paterlini; Hernan Pereyra; Pablo Ryan; Christian Tuñon | Gary Armstrong; Llewellyn Armstrong; Whitcliff Atkinson; Venris Bennett; Garcha Blair; Randolph Coakley; Vianny Jacques; Oneil Levy; Edmund Lewis; Jai Mangra; John Mayers; Gregory Taylor; Dwight Weakley | Arnold Adams; Dennis Archer; Herbert Bascombe; Hasan Durham; Chris Foggo; Dwayne Leverock; Charlie Marshall; Steven Outerbridge; Dennis Pilgrim; Oliver Pitcher; Sam Robinson; Wendell White |

| Canada | Cayman Islands | United States |
|---|---|---|
| Ashish Bagai; Ian Billcliff; Austin Codrington; Nicholas de Groot; Muneeb Diwan; Nicholas Ifill; Ishwar Maraj; Ashish Patel; Sukhjinder Rana; Abdool Samad; Kevin Sandher; Abdul Sattaur; Barry Seebaran; Zubin Surkari | Pearson Best; R. Bouch; Ryan Bovell; Larry Cunningham; Steve Gordon; Carley James; Joseph Kirkconnell; Kenute Tulloch; Christopher Wight; David Wight; Michael Wight; Philip Wight | Amer Afzaluddin; Rohan Alexander; Faoud Bacchus; Donovan Blake; David Hoilette; Howard Johnson; Amjad Khan; Rudy Narine; Naseer Islam; Nasir Javed; S. Patel; Sheetal Pathak; Rafiq Patni; Rashid Zia; Joy Zinto |

== Group stage ==
=== Points Table ===
Pool 1
| Team | P | W | L | T | NR | NRR | Points |
|---|---|---|---|---|---|---|---|
| United States | 5 | 4 | 0 | 0 | 1 | +1.245 | 9 |
| Canada | 5 | 3 | 1 | 0 | 1 | +0.419 | 7 |
| Cayman Islands | 5 | 3 | 1 | 0 | 1 | +1.487 | 7 |
| Bermuda | 5 | 1 | 3 | 0 | 1 | -0.292 | 3 |
| Bahamas | 5 | 1 | 3 | 0 | 1 | -1.850 | 3 |
| Argentina | 5 | 0 | 4 | 0 | 1 | -0.788 | 1 |

=== Match details ===
12 March
Scorecard

| Canada; 185 (47.3 overs) | v | Argentina; 143 (45.5 overs) |
| Ian Billcliff 51; Lucas Paterlini 4/47 (9.3 overs) | | Matias Paterlini 39; Barry Seebaran 2/10 (8 overs) |

Canada won by 42 runs
Lomas Athletic, Buenos Aires
Umpires: Umpires unknown

- Toss Unknown

12 March
Scorecard

| United States; 255/7 (50 overs) | v | Bahamas; 78 (30.3 overs) |
| Faoud Bacchus 83*; Gary Armstrong 6/51 (10 overs) | | Extras (1 b, 1 lb, 1 nb, 12 w) 15; Whitcliff Atkinson 15; Joy Zinto 3/14 (7.3 overs) |

United States won by 177 runs
Belgrano Athletic Club Ground, Buenos Aires
Umpires: Umpires unknown
Player of the match: Faoud Bacchus

- Bahamas won the toss and elected to field.

12 March
Scorecard

| Bermuda; 59 (28 overs) | v | Cayman Islands; 60/6 (24.3 overs) |
| Extras (2 lb, 2 nb, 18 w) 22; Dwayne Leverock 8 Dennis Archer 8 David White 5/12 (10 overs) | | Carley James 15*; Dennis Archer 4/21 (10 overs) |

Cayman Islands won by 4 wickets
Hurlingham Club Ground, Buenos Aires
Umpires: Umpires unknown

- Toss Unknown

13 March
Scorecard

| Argentina; 134 (31 overs) | v | Cayman Islands; 136/3 (35.5 overs) |
| Donald Forrester 55; Ryan Bovell 5/25 (8 overs) | | Christopher Wight 47; Lucas Paterlini 1/20 (10 overs) |

Cayman Islands won by 7 wickets
Belgrano Athletic Club Ground, Buenos Aires
Umpires: Umpires Unknown

- Toss Unknown

13 March
Scorecard

| Bermuda; 196/9 (50 overs) | v | Bahamas; 128 (42.5 overs) |
| Charles Marshall 66; Llewellyn Armstrong 2/30 (7 overs) | | Extras (2 lb, 1 nb, 24 w) 27; Garcha Blair 24; Dennis Pilgrim 3/14 (6 overs) |

Bermuda won by 68 runs
Lomas Athletic, Buenos Aires
Umpires: Umpires Unknown

- Toss Unknown

13 March
Scorecard

| Canada; 165/9 (50 overs) | v | United States; 166/7 (45.5 overs) |
| Fazil Sattaur 67; Howard Johnson 5/30 (10 overs) | | Rohan Alexander 50 (133); Ashish Patel 3/21 (10 overs) |

United States won by 3 wickets
Hurlingham Club Ground, Buenos Aires
Umpires: Umpire Unknown
Player of the match: Rohan Alexander

- USA won the toss and elected to field.

14 March
Scorecard

| United States; 207/8 (50 overs) | v | Argentina; 171 (47.3 overs) |
| S Pathak 43; Lucas Paterlini 3/37 (9 overs) | | Donald Forrester 63; Howard Johnson 2/23 (8.3 overs) |

United States won by 36 runs
Hurlingham Club Ground, Buenos Aires
Umpires: Umpires Unknown
Player of the match: Donald Forrester

- Argentina won the toss and elected to field.

14 March
Scorecard

| Bahamas; 69 (18.3 overs) | v | Cayman Islands; 71/2 (15 overs) |
| Whitcliff Atkinson 24; Kenute Tulloch 5/41 (9.3 overs) | | Carley James 25*; Garcha Blair 2/30 (5 overs) |

Cayman Islands won by 8 wickets
Lomas Athletic, Buenos Aires
Umpires: Umpires Unknown

- Toss Unknown

14 March
Scorecard

| Bermuda; 166 (48.3 overs) | v | Canada; 168/2 (38.4 overs) |
| Chris Foggo 62; Kevin Sandher 5/11 (10 overs) | | Fazil Sattaur 59; Dwayne Leverock 1/26 (10 overs) |

Canada won by 8 wickets
Belgrano Athletic Club Ground, Buenos Aires
Umpires: Umpires Unknown

- Toss Unknown

15 March
Scorecard

| Bahamas; 189 (48.1 overs) | v | Argentina; 166 (48.5 overs) |
| Whitcliff Atkinson 59; Lucas Paterlini 3/19 (9.1 overs) | | Alejandro Ferguson 28; Pablo Ferguson 28; Llewellyn Armstrong 3/33 (10 overs) |

Bahamas won by 23 runs
Hurlingham Club Ground, Buenos Aires
Umpires: Umpires Unknown

- Toss Unknown

15 March
Scorecard

| Bermuda; 140/7 (40 overs) | v | United States; 141/9 (40 overs) |
| Oliver Pitcher 43; Howard Johnson 2/38 (8 overs) | | Amjad Khan 33; Faoud Bacchus 33; Herbert Bascombe 3/19 (8 overs) |

United States won by 1 wicket
Lomas Athletic, Buenos Aires
Umpires: Umpires Unknown
Player of the match: Amjad Khan

- USA won the toss and elected to field.
- Rain reduced match to 40 overs per side.

15 March
Scorecard

| Canada; 198/9 (42 overs) | v | Cayman Islands; 173/8 (38 overs) |
| Ishwar Maraj 50; Michael Wight 3/32 (8 overs) | | Pearson Best 35; Kevin Sandher 2/17 (9 overs) |

Canada won by 25 runs
Belgrano Athletic Club Ground, Buenos Aires
Umpires: Umpires Unknown

- Toss Unknown
- Match reduced to 42 overs per side due to rain. Cayman Islands' innings reduced to 38 overs due to slow over rate.

16 March
Scorecard

| Bermuda | v | Argentina |

Match abandoned without a ball bowled.
Belgrano Athletic Club Ground, Buenos Aires
Umpires: Umpires Unknown

- No toss.
- Match abandoned due to rain.

16 March
Scorecard

| Bahamas | v | Canada |

Match abandoned without a ball bowled.
Hurlingham Club Ground, Buenos Aires
Umpires: Umpires Unknown

- No toss.
- Match abandoned due to rain

16 March
Scorecard

| Cayman Islands | v | United States |

Match abandoned without a ball bowled.
Lomas Athletic, Buenos Aires
Umpires: Umpires Unknown

- No toss.
- Match abandoned due to rain.

== Statistics ==
| Most Runs | | Most Wickets | |
|---|---|---|---|
| (United States) Faoud Bacchus | 169 | (Cayman Islands) Ryan Bovell | 14 |
| (Canada) Fazil Sattaur | 147 | (Argentina) Lucas Paterlini | 11 |
| (Argentina) Donald Forrester | 147 | (United States) Howard Johnson | 10 |
| (The Bahamas) Whitcliff Atkinson | 120 | (Cayman Islands) David Wight | 9 |
| (United States) Rohan Alexander | 104 | Six others at | 7 |
