= 1998–99 Red Stripe Bowl =

Cricket tournament

- Dates: 6 – 19 October 1998
- Administrator: WICB
- Cricket format: List A (50 overs)
- Tournament format(s): Group stage, finals
- Host(s): Guyana; Jamaica
- Champions: Guyana (6th title)
- Participants: 8
- Matches: 15
- Most runs: (Guyana) Shivnarine Chanderpaul (276)
- Most wickets: (Trinidad and Tobago) Dinanath Ramnarine (Antigua and Barbuda) Anthony Lake (10)

The 1998–99 Red Stripe Bowl was the 25th season of what is now the Regional Super50, the domestic limited-overs cricket competition for the countries of the West Indies Cricket Board (WICB). It ran from 6 to 19 October 1998.

Eight teams contested the competition – the six regular teams of West Indian domestic cricket (Barbados, Guyana, Jamaica, the Leeward Islands, Trinidad and Tobago, and the Windward Islands), plus two invited international teams from the ICC Americas region (Bermuda and the United States). All matches at the tournament were held in either Guyana or Jamaica, with the semi-finals and final held in the latter country, in Discovery Bay. Guyana and the Leeward Islands eventually progressed to the final, with Guyana winning by 52 runs to claim their sixth domestic one-day title. Guyanese batsman Shivnarine Chanderpaul led the tournament in runs, while Dinanath Ramnarine of Trinidad and Tobago and Anthony Lake of the Leeward Islands were the joint leading wicket-takers.

== Squads ==
Barbados	Bermuda	Guyana	Jamaica
Philo Wallace (c); Henderson Broomes; Courtney Browne; Hendy Bryan; Sherwin Campbell; Pedro Collins; Adrian Griffith; Ryan Hinds; Roland Holder; Ricky Hoyte; Antonio Mayers; Winston Reid; Floyd Reifer; Patterson Thompson	Charlie Marshall (c); Dennis Archer; B. A. Brathwaite; David Greenidge; Peter Philpott; Sam Robinson; T. Robinson; Irving Romaine; Cleon Scotland; Dexter Smith; Charles Swan; Janeiro Tucker; Kwame Tucker; Keith Wainwright	Carl Hooper (c); Shivnarine Chanderpaul; Lennox Cush; Kevin Darlington; Nicholas de Groot; Andrew Gonsalves; Reon King; Clayton Lambert; Neil McGarrell; Sheik Mohammed; Mahendra Nagamootoo; Ramnaresh Sarwan; Keith Semple; Vijay Seonarine	Jimmy Adams (c); Andre Coley; Raymond Ferguson; Chris Gayle; Howard Harris; Wavell Hinds; Brian Murphy; Nehemiah Perry; Kirk Powell; Tony Powell; Franklyn Rose; Robert Samuels; Laurie Williams
Leeward Islands	Trinidad and Tobago	United States	Windward Islands
Stuart Williams (c); Curtly Ambrose; Hamish Anthony; Keith Arthurton; Kenny Benjamin; Wilden Cornwall; Ridley Jacobs; Dave Joseph; Sylvester Joseph; Anthony Lake; Runako Morton; Carl Tuckett	Brian Lara (c); Ian Bishop; Merv Dillon; Daren Ganga; Kenneth Hazel; Andre Lawrence; Suruj Ragoonath; Dinanath Ramnarine; Phil Simmons; Richard Smith; David Williams	Richard Staple (c); Mohammad Ahmed; Rohan Alexander; Zamin Amin; Nezam Hafiz; Wayne Headley; David Hoilette; Naseer Islam; Nasir Javed; Richard Louis; Desmond Richards; Dave Wallace; Garfield Wildman; Joy Zinto	Junior Murray (c); Alston Crafton; Vernon Dumas; Dawnley Joseph; Hesran Lawrence; Rawl Lewis; Roy Marshall; Nixon McLean; McNeil Morgan; Wayne Phillip; John Sylvester; Balty Watt

== Group stage ==
=== Zone A ===
Team	Pld	W	L	T	NR	Pts	NRR
Guyana	3	2	0	0	1	5	+2.218
Trinidad and Tobago	3	2	0	0	1	5	+1.441
Windward Islands	3	1	2	0	0	2	–0.045
Bermuda	3	0	3	0	0	0	–2.579

6 October 1998
Scorecard

Guyana; 237/6 (50 overs)	v	Windward Islands; 196/9 (50 overs)

Guyana won by 41 runs
Albion Sports Complex, Albion
Player of the match: Carl Hooper (Guy)

7 October 1998
Scorecard

Bermuda; 122/8 (50 overs)	v	Trinidad and Tobago; 124/3 (23 overs)

Trinidad and Tobago won by 7 wickets
Uitvlugt Community Centre Ground, Uitvlugt
Player of the match: Dinanath Ramnarine (Tri)

8 October 1998
Scorecard

Windward Islands; 168 (43.1 overs)	v	Trinidad and Tobago; 169/2 (44.3 overs)

Trinidad and Tobago won by 8 wickets
Enmore Recreation Ground, Enmore
Player of the match: Suruj Ragoonath (Tri)

9 October 1998
Scorecard

Windward Islands; 221 (50 overs)	v	Bermuda; 164 (44.4 overs)

Windward Islands won by 57 runs
Everest Cricket Club Ground, Georgetown
Player of the match: Vernon Dumas (Win)

10 October 1998
Scorecard

Trinidad and Tobago; 217 (49.1 overs)	v	Guyana; 80/3 (21 overs)

No result
Bourda, Georgetown

- Guyana's target was 183 runs in 35 overs.

11 October 1998
Scorecard

Guyana; 235/3 (37 overs)	v	Bermuda; 83 (31.4 overs)

Guyana won by 152 runs
Kayman Sankar Cricket Ground, Hampton Court
Player of the match: Shivnarine Chanderpaul (Guy)

=== Zone B ===
Team	Pld	W	L	T	A	Pts	NRR
Leeward Islands	3	2	1	0	0	4	+1.213
Barbados	3	2	1	0	0	4	+0.889
Jamaica	3	2	1	0	0	4	+0.729
United States	3	0	3	0	0	0	–3.244

6 October 1998
Scorecard

Leeward Islands; 330/4 (50 overs)	v	United States; 88 (28 overs)

Leeward Islands won by 242 runs
Kensington Park, Kingston
Player of the match: Wilden Cornwall (Lee)

7 October 1998
Scorecard

United States; 107 (43.1 overs)	v	Jamaica; 108/2 (19.5 overs)

Jamaica won by 8 wickets
Chedwin Park, Spanish Town
Player of the match: Chris Gayle (Jam)

8 October 1998
Scorecard

Barbados; 235 (49.4 overs)	v	Leeward Islands; 160 (46.2 overs)

Barbados won by 75 runs
Alpart Sports Club Ground, Nain
Player of the match: Philo Wallace (Bar)

9 October 1998
Scorecard

United States; 158/9 (50 overs)	v	Barbados; 159/0 (36.5 overs)

Barbados won by 10 wickets
Alpart Sports Club Ground, Nain
Player of the match: Philo Wallace (Bar)

10 October 1998
Scorecard

Leeward Islands; 181/7 (50 overs)	v	Jamaica; 166 (47 overs)

Leeward Islands won by 15 runs
Sabina Park, Kingston

11 October 1998
Scorecard

Jamaica; 209/9 (50 overs)	v	Barbados; 204/9 (49 overs)

Jamaica won by 5 runs
Sabina Park, Kingston
Player of the match: Chris Gayle (Jam)

- Barbados' innings was reduced to 49 overs due to a slow over rate.

== Finals ==
=== Semi-finals ===
16 October 1998
Scorecard

Guyana; 237/8 (50 overs)	v	Barbados; 72/3 (14.3 overs)

No result
Kaiser Sports Club Ground, Discovery Bay

- Barbados' target was 208 runs in 38 overs.
- Guyana proceeded to the final based on a higher group-stage position.

17 October 1998
Scorecard

Leeward Islands; 172/9 (41 overs)	v	Trinidad and Tobago; 137/5 (31.3 overs)

Leeward Islands won by 34 runs (D/L)
Kaiser Sports Club Ground, Discovery Bay

- The match was reduced to 41 overs per side before the start of play. When play was stopped, Trinidad and Tobago needed to have scored 172 runs to win.
- Trinidad and Tobago were initially awarded the match based one method of calculation, but it was later determined that this method was incorrect according to the rules of the competition, making the Leewards the winner.

=== Final ===
19 October 1998
Scorecard

Guyana; 226/7 (50 overs)	v	Leeward Islands; 174 (45.5 overs)

Guyana won by 52 runs
Kaiser Sports Club Ground, Discovery Bay

== Statistics ==
=== Most runs ===
The top five run scorers (total runs) are included in this table.

Player	Team	Runs	Inns	Avg	Highest	100s	50s
Shivnarine Chanderpaul	Guyana	276	5	92.00	112	1	1
Wilden Cornwall	Leeward Islands	252	5	50.40	126	1	1
Philo Wallace	Barbados	225	4	75.00	104*	1	2
Stuart Williams	Leeward Islands	192	5	38.40	82	0	2
Carl Hooper	Guyana	171	4	57.00	76	0	2

Source: CricketArchive

=== Most wickets ===
The top five wicket takers are listed in this table, listed by wickets taken and then by bowling average.

Player	Team	Overs	Wkts	Ave	SR	Econ	BBI
Dinanath Ramnarine	Guyana	31.1	10	8.80	18.70	2.82	4/18
Anthony Lake	Leeward Islands	47.0	10	17.20	28.20	3.65	5/41
Ryan Hinds	Barbados	30.0	7	15.42	25.71	3.60	4/32
Hendy Bryan	Barbados	27.2	6	17.50	27.33	3.84	3/56
Franklyn Rose	Jamaica	26.1	6	17.83	26.16	4.08	3/17

Source: CricketArchive
