= Niroshan de Silva =

Sri Lankan-born American cricketer

Personal information
- Full name: Niroshan S de Silva
- Born: 29 August 1971 (age 55); Colombo, Western Province, Ceylon
- Batting: Left-handed
- Bowling: Leg break
- Relatives: Somachandra de Silva (father); Hemachandra de Silva (uncle); Premachandra de Silva (uncle)

Domestic team information
- Years: Team
- 1999: Shropshire
- 2000/01: United States

Career statistics
Competition	List A
Matches	1
Runs scored	0
Batting average	–
100s/50s	–/–
Top score	0*
Balls bowled	36
Wickets	1
Bowling average	17.00
5 wickets in innings	–
10 wickets in match	–
Best bowling	1/17
Catches/stumpings	–/–
- Source: Cricinfo, 10 July 2019

Niroshan S de Silva (born 29 August 1971) is a Sri Lankan-born American former cricketer.

The son of the Test cricketer Somachandra de Silva, he was born at Colombo in August 1971. He played minor counties cricket in England for Shropshire from 1999, making a single appearance in the MCCA Knockout Trophy. He later moved to the United States, where he played a single List A one-day match for the United States against Barbados at Jamaica in the 2000–01 Red Stripe Bowl. He took a single wicket in the match with his leg break bowling, dismissing Dale Richards to finish with match figures of 1 for 17 from six overs. His uncles, Hemachandra de Silva and Premachandra de Silva, were also cricketers.
