= Charles Marshall =

Charles Marshall may refer to:

== Science ==
- Charles Marshall (Quaker) (1637–1698), British physician and mystic
- Charles Robertson Marshall (fl. 1894–1928), British physician
- Charles R. Marshall, Australian paleobiologist
- Charles E. Marshall, American microbiologist of Marshall Hall

== Sports ==
- Charles Marshall (cricketer, born 1842) (1842–1925), English cricketer for Cambridgeshire
- Charles Marshall (Middlesex cricketer) (1843–1904), English cricketer Middlesex and Cambridgeshire
- Charles Marshall (Surrey cricketer) (1863–1948), English cricketer
- Charlie Marshall (cricketer) (born 1961), Bermudian cricketer
- Charlie Marshall (rugby union) (1886–1947), British rugby union player
- Chip Marshall (baseball) (Charles Anthony Marshall, 1919–2007), catcher in Major League Baseball
- Charles Marshall (cyclist) (1901–1973), British Olympic cyclist

== Others ==
- Charles Marshall (painter) (1806–1890), English scene-painter
- Charles Marshall (American soldier) (1830–1902), Confederate army officer during the American Civil War
- Charles Henry Tilson Marshall (1841–1927), British Army officer and ornithologist
- Charles Marshall (judge) (1788–1873), chief justice of British Ceylon
- Charles A. Marshall (1898–1985), American cinematographer
- Charles Henry Marshall (1834–1906), American businessman, art collector and philanthropist
- Charles Marshall (engineer) (1864–1953), Australian inventor of the Marshalite rotary traffic signal
- Charles Marshall (1857-1927), British composer of popular songs: e.g. "I Hear You Calling Me"
- Charles Marshall, comics writer; see Alien Nation
- Chip Marshall, American political activist

== Ships ==
- Charles H. Marshall (pilot boat), 19th century New York pilot boat
- Charles H. Marshall (ship), an American packet ship, built 1869
- SS Charles H. Marshall, a Liberty ship, built 1944
