= Indian Oil Cup 2005 =

Indian Oil Cup, 2005
- Date: 30 July – 7 August 2005
- Location: Sri Lanka
- Result: Sri Lanka beat India by 18 runs in the final
- Player of the series: Mahela Jayawardene (SL)
Teams
Sri Lanka	India	West Indies
Captains
Marvan Atapattu	Rahul Dravid	Shivnarine Chanderpaul (2nd, 3rd and 5th ODIs); Sylvester Joseph (6th ODI)
Most runs
Mahela Jayawardene (230)	Yuvraj Singh (192)	Denesh Ramdin (127)
Most wickets
Muttiah Muralitharan (8)	Ashish Nehra (12)	Narsingh Deonarine (5)

The Indian Oil Cup 2005 was a three-team One Day International (ODI) cricket tournament held in Sri Lanka between 30 July and 7 August 2005. The participating teams were hosts Sri Lanka, and India and West Indies. Sri Lanka won the tournament beating India by 18 runs in the final.

Entering the tournament, Sri Lanka were second in the ICC ODI rankings, and were the favorites to win the tournament. West Indies did not field their strongest side as the team was in the middle of a contract dispute with their governing board. Each team played the others twice during the round-robin stage and the two top-placed teams based on points met in the final.

== Squads ==
Sri Lanka	India	West Indies
Marvan Atapattu (c); Sanath Jayasuriya; Upul Tharanga; Kumar Sangakkara (wk); Mahela Jayawardene; Tillakaratne Dilshan; Russel Arnold; Dilhara Lokuhettige; Upul Chandana; Chaminda Vaas; Nuwan Zoysa; Farveez Maharoof; Muttiah Muralitharan; Dilhara Fernando; Lasith Malinga	Rahul Dravid (c); Virender Sehwag; Sourav Ganguly; V. V. S. Laxman; Yuvraj Singh; Mohammad Kaif; Suresh Raina; Yalaka Venugopal Rao; Jai Prakash Yadav; MS Dhoni (wk); Anil Kumble; Harbhajan Singh; Irfan Pathan; Zaheer Khan; Lakshmipathy Balaji; Ashish Nehra	Shivnarine Chanderpaul (c); Denesh Ramdin (wk); Daren Powell; Ricardo Powell; Omari Banks; Kerry Jeremy; Deighton Butler; Sylvester Joseph; Narsingh Deonarine; Dwayne Smith; Tino Best; Jermaine Lawson; Xavier Marshall; Runako Morton; Ryan Ramdass

== Warm-up matches ==
25 July
Scorecard

Indians; 247/8 (50 overs)	v	Sri Lanka Cricket XI; 186 (47 overs)
Mahendra Singh Dhoni 86* (81); Pradeep Jayaprakashdaran 3/35 (10 overs)		Prasanna Jayawardene 66 (82); Irfan Pathan 4/42 (9 overs)

Indians won by 61 runs
Nondescripts Cricket Club Ground, Colombo
Umpires: Grashan Liyanage (SL) and Atula Senanayake (SL)

- Indians won the toss and elected to bat.
- Sri Lanka Cricket XI played with 13 players and Indians with 12, both with 11 batting and 11 fielding.

27 July
Scorecard

Indians; 250 (42.2 overs)	v	Kurunegala District Cricket Association Invitation XI; 157 (36.2 overs)
Mahendra Singh Dhoni 88 (95); Nilukshana Karunaratne 3/47 (9 overs)		Lanka de Silva 53 (56); Irfan Pathan 3/20 (6 overs)

Indians won by 93 runs
Welagedara Stadium, Kurunegala
Umpires: Karunaratne Boteju (SL) and J. G. Pushparajah (SL)

- Indians won the toss and elected to bat.
- Rain reduced the match to 46 overs-a-side.
- Kurunegala District Cricket Association Invitation XI played with 11 players and Indians with 12, both with 11 batting and 11 fielding.

29 July
Report

Kandy XI; 129/8 (30 overs)	v	West Indies XI; 131/8 (28.2 overs)
Arosha Perera 30; Tino Best 3/14		Sylvester Joseph 53*; Duncan Arnolda 3/25

West Indies XI won by 2 wickets
Asgiriya Stadium, Kandy

- West Indies XI won the toss and elected to field.
- Rain reduced the match to 30 overs-a-side.

== Points table ==
Group Stage
Pos	Team	P	W	L	NR	T	BP	CP	Points	NRR	For	Against
1	Sri Lanka	4	3	1	0	0	1	1	17	+0.191	864 (196.2)	842 (200)
2	India	4	2	2	0	0	1	2	13	+0.266	867 (186)	863 (196.2)
3	West Indies	4	1	3	0	0	0	1	6	−0.460	850 (200)	876 (186)

Points System:

- Win (W), with bonus point: 6
- Win (W), without bonus point: 5
- Tie (T) or No Result (NR): 3
- Loss (L), but not conceding bonus point: 1
- Loss (L), conceding bonus point (CP): 0
- Bonus Points (BP): 1 (The team that achieves a run rate of 1.25 times that of the opposition shall be awarded one bonus point. A team's run rate will be calculated by reference to the runs scored in an innings divided by the number of overs faced)
- Net run rate (NRR): Runs per over scored less runs per over conceded, adjusting team batting first to overs of team batting second in rain rule matches, adjusting to team's full allocation if all out, and ignoring no result matches.

In the event of teams finishing on equal points, the right to play in the final match or series was determined as follows:

- The team with the highest number of wins
- If still equal, the team with the highest number of wins over the other team(s) who are equal on points and have the same number of wins
- If still equal, the team with the highest number of bonus points
- If still equal, the team with the highest net run rate

In a match declared as no result, run rate is not applicable.

== Group stage matches ==
=== 1st match ===
30 July (D/N)
Scorecard

India; 205/9 (50 overs)	v	Sri Lanka; 209/7 (48.2 overs)
Rahul Dravid 54 (96); Muttiah Muralitharan 3/33 (10 overs)		Sanath Jayasuriya 43* (50); Zaheer Khan 2/32 (10 overs)

Sri Lanka won by 3 wickets
Rangiri Dambulla International Stadium, Colombo
Umpires: Asoka de Silva (SL) and Simon Taufel (Aus)
Player of the match: Sanath Jayasuriya (SL)

- India won the toss and elected to bat.
- Dilhara Lokuhettige (SL), Suresh Raina (Ind) and Yalaka Venugopal Rao (Ind) made their ODI debuts.

Opting to bat first, India got off to a poor start losing Virender Sehwag in the third over, after he scored three fours off Farveez Maharoof and Dilhara Lokuhettige. The other opener Mahendra Singh Dhoni soon followed him to the pavilion, and Rahul Dravid and Yuvraj Singh were to rebuild, from the score at 22/2. They played cautiously, yet the former gave away his wicket, pulling to substitute fielder Upul Tharanga at mid-on. More wickets followed in the form of debutante, Suresh Raina, who was trapped leg before wicket in his first ball in senior international cricket, by Muttiah Muralitharan's doosra, as India crumbled to 64/5. Dravid, however, played a reliable knock, and together with another debutante, Yalaka Venugopal Rao, added 58 in thirteen overs. However, it came to an end too early to help India significantly in the late overs, with leg-spinner Upul Chandana sneaking a ball past his bat and pads and having him bowled for 54, and India were staring at a very low score – 123/6 after 33 overs. Harbhajan Singh and Zaheer Khan added 20 each, however, which coupled with Irfan Pathan's slow but steady 21, lifted India to a somewhat competitive score of 205/9 at the end of 50 overs.

The only downside for Sri Lanka was that their opener Sanath Jayasuriya had torn his shoulder, and looked unlikely to have a bat. Therefore, Kumar Sangakkara joined Marvan Atapattu as openers for Sri Lanka. They pair added 19 in 26 balls, before Irfan Pathan dug him out with a good inswinger. India took wickets regularly, but by the end of the 25th over Sri Lanka were 99/3, and well on the way to chasing 206. But Harbhajan Singh's off-breaks two players to miss their shots, and suddenly the score was 112/5, with an injured Jayasuriya and debutante Dilhara Lokuhettige at the crease. However, Jayasuriya battled on bravely and made an unbeaten 43 to guide Sri Lanka to the target with ten balls to spare, well helped by Farveez Maharoof, who made 23 from number 9 including four fours hit in front of square and a number of nervy shots that missed the bat.

=== 2nd match ===
31 July (D/N)
Scorecard

West Indies; 178 (47.4 overs)	v	India; 180/4 (36 overs)
Narsingh Deonarine 41 (91); Ashish Nehra 2/23 (9 overs)		Rahul Dravid 52* (65); Jermaine Lawson 2/58 (9 overs)

India won by 6 wickets
Rangiri Dambulla International Stadium, Colombo
Umpires: Daryl Harper (Aus) and Tyron Wijewardene (SL)
Player of the match: Rahul Dravid (Ind)

- West Indies won the toss and elected to bat.
- Ashish Nehra (Ind) was reprimanded for excessive appealing by match referee Mike Proctor.

West Indies got off to a poor start losing their first wicket in the third over and were reduced for 36/3 at the end of 15 overs. Narsingh Deonarine, who had struggled to get off the mark, and Shivnarine Chanderpaul survived for 17 overs, making only 52 before Suresh Raina took his first international wicket as Chanderpaul missed a straight delivery. Ricardo Powell followed shortly afterwards, and despite some slogging from Dwayne Smith, who made 20 off 7 balls including two sixes, and Tino Best, who made 24, West Indies crumbled to 178 all out as Ashish Nehra took two late-order wickets and Zaheer Khan, the final wicket.

After India's shaky first 15 overs which had yielded 83 runs and three wickets, Rahul Dravid (52*) and Yuvraj Singh (28) settled in the crease, and put on 61 runs for the 4th wicket. Mahendra Singh Dhoni took his place with ease, smashing a four and a six on the way to an unbeaten 15, and India reached the target with fourteen overs to spare.

=== Third match ===
2 August (D/N)
Scorecard

Sri Lanka; 241/6 (50 overs)	v	West Indies; 191 (45.1 overs)
Kumar Sangakkara 79 (115); Narsingh Deonarine 2/55 (10 overs)		Dwayne Smith 68 (90); Farveez Maharoof 3/9 (10 overs)

Sri Lanka won by 50 runs
Rangiri Dambulla International Stadium, Colombo
Umpires: Asoka de Silva (SL) and Simon Taufel (Aus)
Player of the match: Farveez Maharoof (SL)

- Sri Lanka won the toss and elected to bat.
- Upul Tharanga (SL), and Deighton Butler and Ryan Ramdass (WIN) made their ODI debuts.
- Farveez Maharoof (SL) was reprimanded for excessive appealing by match referee Mike Proctor.

Sri Lanka lost their first wicket in debutante, Upul Tharanga (6), in the third over, when Kumar Sangakkara joined the other opener Marvan Atapattu, who put 138 runs together for the second wicket in 34 overs. After 25 overs, the score was 78/1, but the pair took to the attack in the next 10 overs and added another 71 before part-timer Narsingh Deonarine had Sangakkara caught at cover for 79. Despite wickets tumbling, Sri Lanka kept the run rate up well and added 107 in the last 15 overs. Russel Arnold made an unbeaten 21 and pairing up with Upul Chandana (15*) for 36 for the seventh wicket, saw Sri Lanka to the 50-over mark on 241/6.

The Sri Lankan bowling attack reduced West Indies to 26/3 by the end of 10 overs, with Farveez Maharoof bowling three maidens in his first five overs and giving away just 5 runs for 2 wickets. Dilhara Lokuhettige picked two up two wickets in the space of five overs, and also had a catch dropped. After 20 overs, the West Indies were 55/5; Maharoof having bowled ten of those, finishing his quota, finishing with figures of 3/9. Deonarine, Dwayne Smith and Denesh Ramdin tried to build their innings. Deonarine inside-edged a delivery from Dilhara Fernando back onto his own stumps for 23, Ramdin departed for 29 in the 37th over after a 46-run partnership, and Smith was bowled by Muralitharan for 69. Losing the tail quickly, they finished at 191, one run short of gaining a bonus point, in 45.1 overs.

=== Fourth match ===
3 August (D/N)
Scorecard

India; 220/8 (50 overs)	v	Sri Lanka; 221/6 (48 overs)
Sourav Ganguly 51 (110); Tillakaratne Dilshan 4/29 (10 overs)		Mahela Jayawardene 94* (114); Ashish Nehra 2/22 (10 overs)

Sri Lanka won by 4 wickets
Rangiri Dambulla International Stadium, Colombo
Umpires: Daryl Harper (Aus) and Tyron Wijewardene (SL)
Player of the match: Mahela Jayawardene (SL)

- India won the toss and elected to bat.
- Pradeep Jayaprakashdaran (SL) made his ODI debut.
- Sourav Ganguly became the third batsman to reach 10,000 runs in ODIs.

Rahul Dravid, India's stand-in captain, retained as captain despite Sourav Ganguly's return to the team following a four-match ban, decided to bat first after winning the toss. The latter and Virender Sehwag put on 67 for the first wicket. The debutant, Pradeep Jayaprakashdaran, picked up Sehwag's wicket, and was economical, conceding only 21 in his six overs, that included five wides. The part-timer Tillakaratne Dilshan picked up three of the next four wickets, but only after India had moved to 117/1. V. V. S. Laxman departed first for 22, Ganguly quickly following suit after having scored 51 off 110 deliveries, in the process reaching 10,000 ODI runs, and Dravid, done in by the drift, was bowled by Dilshan for a golden duck. Dilshan got a fourth scalp, that of Suresh Raina, and finished with figures of 4/29. Irfan Pathan (36*) and Mohammad Kaif (34) attacked the bowlers in the final overs to see India to a competitive 220/8.

Sanath Jayasuriya was still out due to his injury sustained in his last game against India and Muttiah Muralitharan was rested. For India, Irfan Pathan, Lakshmipathy Balaji and Ashish Nehra took four wickets together and toiled away; another fell to a run-out, and Harbhajan Singh had Dilhara Lokuhettige caught behind for a six-ball duck. After 26 overs, Sri Lanka were 96/6, needing 125 from the last 24 overs. At the crease were Mahela Jayawardene and the number eight, Upul Chandana. They saw off Nehra, who finished with 2/22, and managed to get runs off other bowlers, such as part-timers Ganguly and Sehwag, who gave away 55 runs in 9 overs. The pair put on an unbeaten 126 for the seventh wicket to see their team home in 48 overs. Jayawardene finished at 94* and Chandana at 44*.

=== Fifth match ===
6 August (D/N)
Scorecard

West Indies; 226/7 (50 overs)	v	Sri Lanka; 193 (47 overs)
Sylvester Joseph 58 (92); Upul Chandana 2/49 (10 overs)		Russel Arnold 59 (90); Narsingh Deonarine 2/18 (4 overs)

West Indies won by 33 runs
R. Premadasa Stadium, Colombo
Umpires: Asoka de Silva (SL) and Simon Taufel (Aus)
Player of the match: Omari Banks (WI)

- West Indies won the toss and elected to bat.
- The loss was Sri Lanka's first in ten ODIs at home.

Shivnarine Chanderpaul, who was coming in at five or six, opened the innings with Xavier Marshall, in an effort to stabilise the top order. The latter was run out by Upul Tharanga's direct throw to the stumps in the ninth over with the score at 25/1. Chanderpaul (57) put on a 72-run stand with Sylvester Joseph (58) for the second wicket, the team's highest second-wicket partnership in any form of cricket since early May 2005. Joseph and Narsingh Deonarine added 55 together, but after 41 overs West Indies were still at a relatively paltry 166/4; Joseph having been run out after a mix-up with Omari Banks. However, Banks redeemed himself with 33. Ricardo Powell and Tino Best hit quick runs, and saw the team reach 226/7 at the end of 50 overs.

After an opening ten overs which yielded 46 runs for Sri Lanka, Sanath Jayasuriya was trapped lbw by Deighton Butler with the last delivery of the tenth over, following which Daren Powell and Dwayne Smith tied the Sri Lankans down with good pace bowling. Powell got Kumar Sangakkara's wicket for 7, before Smith dug out two wickets with successive balls as Sri Lanka moved to 73/4. Mahela Jayawardene gave an heave to Powell, and Sri Lanka were five down for 92, after 25 overs. Banks finished with 26 runs from his ten overs, securing the wicket of Chandana, following which Sri Lanka felt were compelled to lash out in order to have a go at reaching the target. The part-timer Deonarine got two wickets, including the final one of Russel Arnold, who made a slow 59, before bowling Sri Lanka out to 193 at the end of the 47th over, thereby helping his team win their first game of the tournament.

=== Sixth match ===
7 August (D/N)
Scorecard

India; 262/4 (50 overs)	v	West Indies; 255/9 (50 overs)
Yuvraj Singh 110 (114); Deighton Butler 1/30 (8 overs)		Runako Morton 84 (104); Anil Kumble 3/38 (10 overs)

India won by 7 runs
R. Premadasa Stadium, Colombo
Umpires: Daryl Harper (Aus) and Tyron Wijewardene (SL)
Player of the match: Yuvraj Singh (Ind)

- India won the toss and elected to bat.

This match was, in effect, a semi-final, with both teams needing a win to proceed to the final with Sri Lanka. Rahul Dravid won the toss and chose to bat. His teammates were immediately worried by the hostile bowling of the West Indian seamers who got plenty of swing and awkward bounce. It was enough to send Sourav Ganguly out of the match with an arm injury in the fourth over, and Virender Sehwag and V. V. S. Laxman were also dismissed early. Effectively, India were three batsmen down for 21 at that point. Dravid and Yuvraj Singh rebuilt with a 30-run partnership when Omari Banks struck with his first ball bowling out Dravid, reducing India to 51/3 after 16 overs. Singh, however, kept his calm, and was well supported by Mohammad Kaif (83*), putting together 165 runs off 178 balls for the fourth wicket. The pair took runs off Narsingh Deonarine in particular, clubbing him for 69 in eight overs, while the seamers Deighton Butler, Tino Best and Daren Powell were not used for the full ten overs. Singh was eventually got out for 110, sweeping Best to short fine leg. Blitz by Mahendra Singh Dhoni (28*) in the final overs which included two sixes, lifted India to 262/4.

Sylvester Joseph led the West Indian side in Shivnarine Chanderpaul's absence owing to illness. Openers Xavier Marshall and Runako Morton attacked from the outset, plundering 37 runs from the first six overs, when Irfan Pathan got Marshall out with an inswinger and bowled a wicket-maiden over. Pathan, Ashish Nehra and Anil Kumble continued to dig out wickets, but Morton remained at the crease. The West Indies crashing to 112/6 after 24 overs. Kumble did get Banks and Dwayne Smith out lbw, the latter for a 12-ball cameo that yielded 26 runs. However, Morton stuck in, making 84, before losing his wicket to Nehra, getting caught by Dravid. West Indies needed 68 runs from 11 overs, with three wickets in hand. Denesh Ramdin, the wicket-keeper, gave it a go. He hacked at everything, missing occasionally, but also getting quite a few boundaries. His team needed twelve runs off the last over, and Nehra conceded only 4, helping his team win by seven runs.

== Final ==
Final
9 August (D/N)
Scorecard

Sri Lanka; 281/9 (50 overs)	v	India; 263/9 (50 overs)
Mahela Jayawardene 83 (97); Ashish Nehra 6/59 (10 overs)		Rahul Dravid 69 (99); Muttiah Muralitharan 2/35 (10 overs)

Sri Lanka won by 18 runs
R. Premadasa Stadium, Colombo
Umpires: Asoka de Silva (SL) and Simon Taufel (Aus)
Player of the match: Mahela Jayawardene (SL)

- Sri Lanka won the toss and elected to bat.
- Sanath Jayasuriya (SL) became the fourth player to reach 10,000 runs in ODIs.
- Ashish Nehra (Ind) became the sixth player to take a 6-wicket haul and end up on the losing side.

Sri Lanka prevailed on home soil, recovering from Nehra's spell of swing bowling and Sehwag's massive onslaught to keep their 2.5-year unbeaten record in home international tournaments. It started with Atapattu choosing to bat after winning the toss, and then getting bowled by Nehra for 11 after misreading the line. Sri Lanka sent in a pinch hitter in Dilhara who hit two fours and a single off seven deliveries before being dubiously adjudged lbw, again from Nehra. Nehra took his third wicket when Sangakkara was caught at point by Sehwag, and Sri Lanka were struggling slightly at 67 for 3.

Meanwhile, Jayasuriya was dropped twice, but survived and went on to make 67 before being run out attempting a difficult second run. By that time, however, he had steadied the ship with Jayawardene, and Arnold helped to up the pace - the score being 122 for 4 after 26 overs, when Jayasuriya was out. It did not matter, as Arnold and Jayawardene treated the spinners with disdain, plundering 125 runs in 20 overs and accelerating the scoring to a point where India could not keep up. Nehra tried, and his variations gave him more wickets - he finished with the second six-wicket-haul of his career, the first coming against England in the 2003 World Cup, but a returning Vaas helped himself to 18 not out and upped the total to 281 for 9. An interesting feature of the scorecard was that no Indian bowler apart from Nehra got wickets - six for him, the other three were run outs.

Sehwag plundered nine fours and a six on his way to a 22-ball 48 before Vaas curved a short one into his body and Sehwag obligingly chopped onto his stumps. It included India having a 22-run over off Dilhara. Ganguly was lbw to Dilshan in the 16th over, but Yuvraj and Dravid set the scene for an Indian victory, pairing up for 84 for the third wicket as India needed 98 in 15 overs.

However, Yuvraj swept to Dilhara when the 36th over began, and just as Kaif had begun to settle in with Dravid, a miscommunication left Dravid out of his crease, run out for 69. Kaif needed to forge a partnership with Dhoni, India's last recognised batsman as they had gone in with five specialist bowlers, but Dhoni was deceived by a straight ball from Chandana and lbw for 7. None of the batsmen from seven to eleven managed to get into double figures, Kaif was left to injudicious hitting and naturally top-edged one to midwicket, and India's chase - thought to be relatively simple fifteen overs before - ended a whole 18 runs short of Sri Lanka's total.

== Statistics ==
=== Most runs ===
Player	Team	Runs	Inns	Ave	SR	HS	100	50
Mahela Jayawardene	Sri Lanka	230	5	57.50	80.13	94*	0	2
Yuvraj Singh	India	192	4	48.00	73.00	110	1	0
Rahul Dravid	India	185	5	46.25	64.45	69	0	3
Mohammad Kaif	India	180	5	45.00	75.63	83*	0	1
Russel Arnold	Sri Lanka	170	5	42.50	76.57	64	0	2

=== Most wickets ===
Player	Team	Wkts	Mat	Ave	SR	Econ	BBI
Ashish Nehra	India	12	5	16.50	24.0	4.12	6/59
Muttiah Muralitharan	Sri Lanka	8	4	18.12	30.0	3.62	3/33
Upul Chandana	Sri Lanka	7	5	29.85	35.8	4.99	2/38
Tillakaratne Dilshan	Sri Lanka	6	5	18.00	24.1	4.46	4/29
Irfan Pathan	India	6	5	33.83	46.00	4.41	2/34
