= Charlie Marshall =

Charlie Marshall may refer to:

- Charlie Marshall (cricketer) (born 1961), Bermudian cricketer
- Chip Marshall (baseball) (1919–2007), American professional baseball catcher
- Charlie Marshall (rugby union) (1886–1947), British rugby union player

== See also ==
- Charles Marshall (disambiguation)
