= Vibart =

Vibart is both a surname and a given name. Notable people with the name include:

- Henry Vibart (1863–1939), Scottish actor
- Vibart Wight (1902–1969), Guyanese cricketer
- Edward Vibart (1807–1857), British Soldier, murdered by Sepoys at Siege of Cawnpore
- Edward Daniel Hamilton Vibart (1837–1923), son of the above, soldier and writer
