= Joy Zinto =

Indian-born American cricketer

Personal information
- Full name: Joy Jivankumar Zinto
- Born: 7 August 1965 (age 61); Ahmedabad, Gujarat, India
- Batting: Right-handed
- Bowling: Left-arm orthodox

International information
- National side: United States (1998–2002)

Domestic team information
- Years: Team
- 1984–1989: Gujarat (India)
- 1989: West Zone (India)
- Source: CricketArchive, 11 March 2016

Joy Jivankumar Zinto (born 7 August 1965) is a former international cricketer who represented the American national team between 1998 and 2002. He was born in India, and played first-class cricket there before emigrating to the United States.

Zinto was born in Ahmedabad, Gujarat. He made his first-class debut for the Gujarat cricket team in December 1984, aged 19, in a Ranji Trophy match against Bombay. An all-rounder who batted right-handed and bowled left-arm orthodox spin, Zinto was a regular for Gujarat throughout the rest of the 1980s. During the 1989–90 season, his last for Gujarat, he was also selected to play for West Zone in the Duleep Trophy. Zinto took two five-wicket hauls in Ranji Trophy matches – 5/102 against Bombay in January 1988 and 5/88 against Baroda in January 1989. He also recorded three half-centuries as a batsman, the highest of which was an innings of 85 made against Bombay in November 1986 (from eighth in the batting order).

After emigrating to the United States, Zinto made his debut for the U.S. national team in October 1998, in the 1998–99 Red Stripe Bowl (a West Indian domestic competition to which the United States had been invited as a guest team). In three matches, he failed to take a wicket, at the same time conceding 102 runs. Zinto next represented the U.S. at the 2001 ICC Trophy in Canada, which was the final qualification tournament for the 2003 World Cup. He appeared in all nine of his team's matches, and took ten wickets, which was the fourth-most for his team (behind Naseer Islam, Nasir Javed, and Donovan Blake). His best figures came in a match against the Netherlands, where he finished with 3/32 from ten overs, while he also took 3/34 against Papua New Guinea. Zinto's last international appearances came at the 2002 Americas Championship in Argentina, where he took four wickets from four matches (including 3/14 against the Bahamas.
