= Keith Wainwright =

Keith Wainwright may refer to:

- Keith Wainwright (hairdresser) (1944–2024), English hairdresser
- Keith Wainwright (cricketer), Bermudian former cricketer
