= Kaiser Sports Club Ground =

Cricket ground in Discovery Bay, Jamaica

- Port Rhoades Sports Club Ground
- Interactive map of Kaiser Sports Club Ground

Ground information
- Location: Discovery Bay, Jamaica
- Country: Jamaica
- Coordinates: 18.4561°N 77.4170°W
- Establishment: c. 1977
- Capacity: 5,000

Team information
Jamaica	(1977/78–2009/10)
- As of 24 April 2022; Source: Ground profile

Kaiser Sports Club Ground is a cricket ground in Discovery Bay, Jamaica.

== History ==
With the introduction of the bauxite mining industry to Jamaica in the late 1950s and mid 1960s, a number of sports and social club's were constructed for their employees. The Kaiser Sports Club was one such sports and social club, and was originally based in the south of Jamaica at Port Kaiser, near the village of Alligator Pond. The club later moved to the north of the island, close to a bauxite mine near Discovery Bay. The ground first held a major cricket match in January 1978, when Jamaica played the Windward Islands in a List A one-day match in the 1977–78 Geddes Grant/Harrison Line Trophy. A one-day fixture in the following seasons competition was played there, before a gap of sixteen years before the ground next hosted a major match. From 1995 to 2003, the ground was a regular venue for one-day matches, hosting 22 matches during that period. In April 2010, Jamaica played Ireland and Canada in the last two one-day matches to be played at the ground. The ground has also played host to five first-class matches for Jamaica in the Regional Four Day Competition. The sports club later changed its name to the Port Rhoades Sports Club and in June 2020 stated its intention to see Jamaica return to play matches at the ground.

== Records ==
=== First-class ===
- Highest team total: 301 for 7 declared by Jamaica v West Indies B, 2002–03
- Lowest team total: 94 all out by West Indies B v Jamaica, 2002–03
- Highest individual innings: 81 by Keith Hibbert for Jamaica v Leeward Islands, 2001–02
- Best bowling in an innings: 7-58 by Casper Davis for Windward Islands v Jamaica, 1996–97
- Best bowling in a match: 8-37 by Jerome Taylor for Jamaica v Leeward Islands, 2004–05

=== List A ===
- Highest team total: 264 for 4 (50 overs) by Jamaica v United States, 2000–01
- Lowest team total: 94 all out (39 overs) by Windward Islands v Jamaica, 1977–78
- Highest individual innings: 118 by Keith Arthurton for Leeward Islands v Jamaica, 1996–97
- Best bowling in an innings: 5-12 by Laurie Williams for Jamaica v United States, 2000–01

== See also ==
- List of cricket grounds in the West Indies
