= Curtis Jackson (disambiguation) =

Curtis Jackson or 50 Cent (born 1975), is an American rapper.

Curtis Jackson may also refer to:

- Curtis Jackson (gridiron football) (born 1973), American football wide receiver
- Curtis Jackson (cricketer) (born 1967), Bermudian cricketer
- Curtis "C.J." Jackson, fictional character from the American television series, The White Shadow
- Curtis Jackson, character in American Ninja
