= Goldwyn Prince =

Antiguan cricketer (born 1974)

Personal information
- Full name: Goldwyn Terrence Prince
- Born: 18 June 1974 (age 52); Antigua
- Batting: Right-handed
- Bowling: Right-arm fast

Domestic team information
- Years: Team
- 1999–2002: Leeward Islands
- Source: CricketArchive, 14 January 2016

Goldwyn Terrence Prince (born 18 June 1974) is a former Antiguan cricketer who played for the Leeward Islands in West Indian domestic cricket. He played as a right-arm fast bowler.

Prince made his senior Leeward Islands debut in the 1999–00 Red Stripe Bowl, a limited-overs competition. He took eight wickets from four matches at the tournament (including 4/46 against Trinidad and Tobago), which was the most of any pace bowler and behind only Guyana's Neil McGarrell overall. A few weeks later, based on this form, Prince was selected for West Indies A, playing two first-class games against India A. He made his first-class debut for the Leewards later in the season, and subsequently spent the 2000 English season playing for Worcestershire in the Second XI Championship. In the 2000–01 Red Stripe Bowl, Prince was again of the leading bowlers in the competition, taking 11 wickets (including 4/22 against Bermuda) to place third for overall wickets. The following season, he played for Antigua and Barbuda (competing separately for the first time), but appeared only once. Prince took his first and only first-class five-wicket haul in the 2001–02 Busta Cup, 5/96 against Barbados, in what turned out to be his second-last game for the Leewards.
