= Callitos Lopez =

Barbadian cricketer

Personal information
- Full name: Callitos Fernando Lopez
- Born: 10 December 1980 (age 45); Saint Peter Parish, Barbados
- Batting: Right-handed
- Bowling: Right-arm fast-medium

Domestic team information
- Years: Team
- 2000: Barbados
- 2002: West Indies B
- 2008: Combined Campuses
- Source: CricketArchive, 27 December 2015

Callitos Fernando Lopez (born 10 December 1980) is a former Barbadian cricketer who played for Barbadian national side and several other teams in West Indian domestic cricket. He played as a right-arm pace bowler.

== Biography ==
Lopez was born in Saint Peter Parish, Barbados.

He represented the West Indies under-19s in six matches in the 2000 Under-19 World Cup in Sri Lanka, and took five wickets with a best of 3/16 against Zimbabwe. After the World Cup, Lopez made his first-class debut in August 2000, playing for Barbados against a touring South Africa A team. Opening the bowling with future West Indies international Ian Bradshaw, he took 5/61 in the second innings of the match, which was to be the best performance of his career. Later in 2000, Lopez played two limited-overs matches for Barbados in the 2000–01 Red Stripe Bowl. He did not return to first-class cricket until the 2001–02 Busta Cup, when he appeared in five matches for West Indies B (a development team). He had little success, however, taking only five wickets.

In November 2008, after over six years out of top-flight West Indian domestic cricket, Lopez was selected in the Combined Campuses and Colleges squad for the 2008–09 WICB Cup. He took three wickets in four matches, with a best of 2/66 against Trinidad and Tobago.
