= Hollister Pajotte =

Trinidadian cricketer (born 1976)

Personal information
- Born: 30 October 1976 (age 50); San Fernando, Trinidad
- Batting: Right-handed
- Role: Wicket-keeper

Domestic team information
- Years: Team
- 2000: Trinidad and Tobago
- Source: Cricinfo, 27 December 2015

Hollister Pajotte (born 30 October 1976) is a former Trinidadian cricketer who played a single match for Trinidad and Tobago in West Indian domestic cricket.

Pajotte was born in San Fernando, Trinidad. His first and only match for Trinidad and Tobago came in October 2000, in a limited-overs match against the United States in the 2000–01 Red Stripe Bowl. Pajotte usually played as a wicket-keeper, but due to Keno Mason already taking the wicket-keeping gloves was instead selected solely as a batsman. He came in third in the batting order, after Lincoln Roberts and Andy Jackson, and scored four not out, after his team had earlier bowled their opponents out for just 62 runs. Outside of cricket, Pajotte worked as a policeman.
