= Pradeep Jayaprakashdaran =

Sri Lankan cricketer (born 1984)

Personal information
- Full name: Arulampalam Pradeep Sri Jayaprakashdaran
- Born: 13 January 1984 (age 42); Colombo, Sri Lanka
- Batting: Right-handed
- Bowling: Right-arm fast-medium

International information
- National side: Sri Lanka
- Only ODI (cap 126): 3 August 2005 v India

Career statistics
Competition	ODI
Matches	1
Runs scored	–
Batting average	–
100s/50s	–
Top score	–
Balls bowled	36
Wickets	1
Bowling average	21.00
5 wickets in innings	0
10 wickets in match	0
Best bowling	1/21
Catches/stumpings	0/–
- Source: Cricinfo, 10 April 2017

Pradeep Sri Jayaprakashdaran (born 13 January 1984) is a former Sri Lankan cricketer from the city of Colombo.

== School times ==
Educated at the Royal College, Colombo he played in the Royal–Thomian and went on to play club level for the Tamil Union Cricket and Athletic Club.

== International career ==
He has played one One Day International, against India in the group stage of the 2005 Indian Oil Cup.
