= Charles Swan (cricketer) =

Bermudian cricketer

Personal information
- Full name: Charles Swan
- Batting: Unknown
- Bowling: Unknown

Domestic team information
- Years: Team
- 1998/99: Bermuda

Career statistics
Competition	List A
Matches	3
Runs scored	4
Batting average	4.00
100s/50s	–/–
Top score	3*
Balls bowled	108
Wickets	–
Bowling average	–
5 wickets in innings	–
10 wickets in match	–
Best bowling	–
Catches/stumpings	–/–
- Source: Cricinfo, 31 March 2013

Charles Swan (date of birth unknown) is a former Bermudian cricketer. Swan's batting and bowling styles are unknown.

Swan made his debut for Bermuda in a List A match against Trinidad and Tobago in the 1998–99 Red Stripe Bowl, and made two further List A appearances in that tournament against the Windward Islands and Guyana. He scored four runs in his three List A matches, and bowled eighteen wicketless overs.
