= Raymond Denny =

Barbadian-born American cricketer

Personal information
- Full name: Raymond O'Brien Denny
- Born: 21 January 1963 (age 63); Saint James Parish, Barbados
- Batting: Right-handed
- Role: Wicket-keeper

International information
- National side: United States (1991–2000)
- Source: CricketArchive, 2 February 2016

Raymond O'Brien Denny (born 21 January 1963) is a former international cricketer who represented the American national side between 1991 and 2000. He played as a wicket-keeper.

Denny was born in Barbados, in Saint James Parish. Having represented Barbados at under-19 level, he toured England with the West Indies under-19s in 1982, playing several internationals against the England under-19s. After emigrating to the United States, Denny made his debut for the U.S. national team in 1991, against Canada. At the 1994 ICC Trophy in Kenya, he played in five of his team's seven matches, sharing the wicket-keeping duties with Garfield Wildman. As a batsman, he scored 142 runs four innings, which was behind only Paul Singh and Edward Lewis for his team. Denny's highest score was 61, made against the United Arab Emirates. At the 1997 ICC Trophy in Malaysia, he played in all but one match, with only Faoud Bacchus scoring more runs for the United States. Denny's final matches for the U.S. came in 2000, at the 2000 Americas Cricket Cup and the 2000–01 Red Stripe Bowl (the latter being the West Indian domestic one-day competition). He served as captain for both tournaments. At
