= Peter Wight (cricketer) =

Guyanese cricketer

Personal information
- Full name: Peter Bernard Wight
- Born: 25 June 1930; Georgetown, British Guiana
- Died: 31 December 2015 (aged 85)
- Nickname: Rajah
- Batting: Right-handed
- Bowling: Right-arm offbreak
- Role: Batsman
- Relatives: Vibart Wight (cousin); Arnold Wight (brother); Leslie Wight (brother); Norman Wight (brother)

Domestic team information
- Years: Team
- 1953–1965: Somerset
- 1963/64: Canterbury
- 1950/51: British Guiana
- First-class debut: 10 March 1951 British Guiana v Jamaica
- Last First-class: 3 July 1965 Somerset v Nottinghamshire

Umpiring information
- FC umpired: 567 (1966–1995)
- LA umpired: 462 (1966–1995)

Career statistics
Competition	First-class	List A
Matches	333	6
Runs scored	17773	56
Batting average	33.09	9.33
100s/50s	28/91	0/0
Top score	222*	38
Balls bowled	4721	–
Wickets	68	–
Bowling average	33.26	–
5 wickets in innings	1	–
10 wickets in match	0	n/a
Best bowling	6/29	–/–
Catches/stumpings	203/	–/–
- Source: CricketArchive, 16 February 2010

Peter Bernard Wight (25 June 1930 – 31 December 2015) was a Guyanese first-class cricketer who played for Somerset, Canterbury and British Guiana. Wight was a prolific run scorer at the top of the order, scoring 16,965 runs during his thirteen years at Somerset; and at the time of his death only Harold Gimblett had made more runs for the county. After playing, he became an umpire in English first-class cricket, standing in matches from 1966 to 1995.

== Early life ==
His family was a mix of Scottish and Portuguese blood with good cricketing talent. His cousin, Vibart Wight had represented the West Indies twice, acting as vice-captain in the third Test against England in 1928. His elder brother Leslie Wight also went on to play Test cricket for the West Indies, while his other brothers, Arnold and Norman, represented British Guiana at cricket, hockey, tennis and soccer.

Wight came to England at the age of 20, arriving on a cargo boat in 1951. The conditions in England came as a shock to him, with rationing and outside toilets still prevalent. He had arrived in the country with the intention of studying engineering, but his employer in Burnley refused to release him, as promised, for his motor mechanic exams. With this, he emigrated to Toronto before returning to Lancashire to work in a factory.

== Career ==
=== Playing career ===
In 1953, Wight was scoring runs for Burnley Cricket Club in the Lancashire League when his brother-in-law suggested he try out for Somerset. He impressed in the nets and was selected to play in a trial game, against the touring Australians. A shaky start saw him dismissed for a first-innings duck but he scored a century in the second-innings and was offered a Somerset contract.

Wight passed 1,000 runs in a season for the first of ten successive years during 1954; his first full season with the county, totalling 1,343 runs in 50 first-class innings. The following year he made his maiden County Championship century, with 106 in the first innings of a nine wicket victory over Worcestershire. The next three seasons proceeded in a similar fashion, with Wight scoring runs with an average fluctuating between the high twenties and low thirties, failing to make the big scores needed to boost it further.

It was during the 1959 season that he truly established himself as one of the leading batsmen in English cricket, despite missing a number of games due to eye problems. He finished the season with 1,874 runs, and with the joint second highest batting average (of those playing more than 2 innings) in the County Championship, behind only M. J. K. Smith. His career best score came also during this season, when he achieved 222* for Somerset against the visiting Kent at the County Ground, Taunton.

=== Coaching and umpiring career ===
When he was released by Somerset in 1965 he had scored 16,965 runs for the county. After retiring he opened a cricket school in Bath and spent 30 summers as an umpire. He umpired 567 games in total and when added to his games as a player he holds the record for most first-class appearances in post-war England.

== Honours ==
=== First-class ===
- Passed 1,000 first-class runs in a season: 1954, 1955, 1956, 1957, 1958, 1959, 1960, 1961, 1962, 1963
- Passed 2,000 first-class runs in a season: 1960, 1962
- County Championship leading run-scorer: 1960

=== Miscellaneous ===
- Named as one of the Playfair Cricket Annual Eleven Cricketers of the Year in 1961.
