= Alvin Howard =

American cricketer

Personal information
- Born: 1962 (age 63–64); Barbados
- Batting: Right-handed
- Bowling: Right-arm fast

International information
- National side: United States (1994–2000)
- Source: CricketArchive, 1 August 2016

Alvin Howard (born 1962) is a former American international cricketer who represented the American national team between 1994 and 2000. He played as a right-arm fast bowler.

Howard was born in Barbados, and represented the Barbados under-19 team prior to emigrating to the United States. He made his international debut at the 1994 ICC Trophy in Kenya, playing in three of his team's matches. He took five wickets, including 3/21 against Bangladesh and 2/24 against East and Central Africa. Over the next few years, Howard played regularly for the United States in friendly matches against other international teams, including Bangladesh, Bermuda, and Canada. His second and final major tournament for the team was the 2000–01 Red Stripe Bowl, a West Indian domestic limited-overs competition in which the United States was competing as a guest team. At the tournament, Howard took four wickets in four matches, with a best of 2/52 against Jamaica.
