= David Greenidge =

Bermudian cricketer

Personal information
- Full name: David Greenidge
- Born: Unknown
- Batting: Unknown
- Bowling: Unknown

Domestic team information
- Years: Team
- 1998/99: Bermuda

Career statistics
Competition	List A
Matches	2
Runs scored	14
Batting average	7.00
100s/50s	–/–
Top score	10
Balls bowled	–
Wickets	–
Bowling average	–
5 wickets in innings	–
10 wickets in match	–
Best bowling	–
Catches/stumpings	1/–
- Source: Cricinfo, 31 March 2013

David Greenidge (date of birth unknown) is a former Bermudian cricketer. Greenidge's batting and bowling styles are unknown.

Greenidge made his debut for Bermuda in a List A match against Trinidad and Tobago in the 1998–99 Red Stripe Bowl. He made a further List A appearance in that tournament against the Windward Islands, scoring a total of 14 runs in his two List A matches with a high score of 10.
