= Dave Wallace (cricketer) =

American cricketer

Personal information
- Full name: David Wallace
- Born: unknown
- Role: Opening batsman

International information
- National side: United States (1996–2001)
- Source: ESPNcricinfo, 11 March 2016

David Wallace (date of birth unknown) is a former international cricketer who represented the American national team between 1996 and 2001. He played as an opening batsman.

Wallace made his international debut at the 1996 Caribbean–Atlantic Cup, an invitational tournament in Barbados that also featured the national teams of Barbados, Bermuda, and Canada. His next appearances for the national team came in the 1998–99 Red Stripe Bowl, a West Indian domestic competition in which the U.S. were competed as guests (along with Bermuda). He featured in his team's matches against the Leeward Islands and Jamaica, but in each game was dismissed for a duck by West Indies international players – Curtly Ambrose and Franklyn Rose. Wallace also represented the U.S. in the 2000–01 Red Stripe Bowl, appearing against Jamaica and Canada. Against Jamaica, he was his team's leading run-scorer, making 44 runs (including two sixes) before being bowled by Laurie Williams. Wallace's final international appearances came in the 2001 ICC Trophy in Canada, which was the qualification tournament for the 2003 World Cup. He played in all nine of his team's matches, and finished with 195 runs, which was behind only Rohan Alexander and Faoud Bacchus among his teammates. His tournament included two half-centuries – 62 against Papua New Guinea and 68 against Hong Kong.
