= Albert Texeira =

Saint Vincent and the Grenadines cricketer (born 1960)

Personal information
- Full name: Albert Douglas Texeira
- Born: 1 July 1960 (age 66); Mesopotamia, Saint Vincent
- Batting: Left-handed
- Bowling: Left-arm orthodox

International information
- National side: United States (1993–2000)

Domestic team information
- Years: Team
- 1981–1985: Windward Islands
- Source: CricketArchive, 2 February 2016

Albert Douglas Texeira (born 1 July 1960) is a former international cricketer who played for the American national team from 1993 to 2000. He was born in Saint Vincent, and earlier played for the Windward Islands in West Indian domestic cricket.

Texeira made his first-class debut for the Windward Islands in March 1982, playing against the Leeward Islands during the 1981–82 Shell Shield season. A left-handed middle-order batsman, he made semi-regular appearances for the team over the following three seasons, at both first-class and one-day level. However, Texeira had little success, with his highest score in 14 first-class matches being only 48 not out, made against Jamaica in February 1983. His last appearance for the Windwards was in March 1985. After emigrating to the U.S. in 1985, Texeira made his debut for the U.S. national team in 1993, against a West Indies XI in Florida. He subsequently represented the United States at the 1994 and 1997 editions of the ICC Trophy (the qualifier for the Cricket World Cup). His best performance was 44 not out, made against Gibraltar in 1997. Texeira played his final matches for the U.S. at the age of 40, appearing in three matches in the 2000–01 Red Stripe Bowl (the West Indian domestic one-day tournament).
