= B. A. Brathwaite =

Bermudian cricketer

Personal information
- Full name: B. A. Brathwaite

Domestic team information
- Years: Team
- 1996/97–1998/99: Bermuda

Career statistics
Competition	List A
Matches	6
Runs scored	12
Batting average	6.00
100s/50s	0/0
Top score	10
Balls bowled	144
Wickets	3
Bowling average	51.66
5 wickets in innings	0
10 wickets in match	0
Best bowling	1/16
Catches/stumpings	1/–
- Source: Cricinfo, 19 March 2012

B. A. Brathwaite (born 1 January 1970) is a former Bermudian cricketer. Brathwaite's batting and bowling styles are unknown.

Brathwaite made his debut for Bermuda in a List A match against the Windward Islands in the 1996–97 Shell/Sandals Trophy, with him making three further List A appearances in that seasons tournament. He later further made two List A appearances in the 1998–99 Red Stripe Bowl against Trinidad and Tobago and the Windward Islands. He scored a total of 12 runs in his six matches, as well as taking three wickets from a total of 24 overs bowled.
