= T. Robinson =

Bermudian cricketer

Personal information
- Full name: T. Robinson
- Born: Unknown
- Batting: Unknown
- Bowling: Unknown

Domestic team information
- Years: Team
- 1998/99: Bermuda

Career statistics
| Competition | List A |
|---|---|
| Matches | 1 |
| Runs scored | 0 |
| Batting average | – |
| 100s/50s | –/– |
| Top score | 0* |
| Balls bowled | 24 |
| Wickets | – |
| Bowling average | – |
| 5 wickets in innings | – |
| 10 wickets in match | – |
| Best bowling | – |
| Catches/stumpings | 2/– |
- Source: Cricinfo, 26 March 2012

T. Robinson (full name and date of birth unknown) is a former Bermudian cricketer. Robinson's batting and bowling styles are unknown.

Robinson made a single List A appearance for Bermuda against Guyana in the 1998–99 Red Stripe Bowl. In a match which Guyana won by 152 runs, Robinson bowled four wicketless overs which conceded 27 runs in Guyana's innings of 235/3, while in Bermuda's chase he ended their innings of 83 all out unbeaten without scoring.
