= Oneil Levy =

Bahamian cricketer (born 1983)

Personal information
- Full name: Oneil Nester Levy
- Born: 10 April 1983 (age 43); Bahamas
- Batting: Right-handed
- Bowling: Right-arm (unknown)

International information
- National side: Bahamas

Career statistics
| Competition | T20 |
|---|---|
| Matches | 1 |
| Runs scored | 19 |
| Batting average | 19.00 |
| 100s/50s | –/– |
| Top score | 19 |
| Balls bowled | 24 |
| Wickets | – |
| Bowling average | – |
| 5 wickets in innings | – |
| 10 wickets in match | – |
| Best bowling | – |
| Catches/stumpings | –/– |
- Source: Cricinfo, 28 May 2010

Oneil Nester Levy (born 10 April 1983) is a former Bahamian cricketer. Levy is a right-handed batsman who was a right-arm bowler, although his style is unknown. Levy represented the Bahamas national cricket team in 5 matches.

Levy made his debut for the Bahamas in the 2002 ICC Americas Championship against the United States.

In 2002, he represented the Americas U-19's in the 2002 West Indies Cricket Board Under-19 Tournament, where he played in 5 matches for the team.

Levy made his Twenty20 appearance for the Bahamas against the Cayman Islands in the 1st round of the 2006 Stanford 20/20. Levy scored 19 runs, with the Bahamas losing by 57 runs. This was Levy's final appearance for the Bahamas.
