= Charles Marshall (Quaker) =

Charles Marshall (1637 – 15 November 1698) was an early Quaker mystic, medical practitioner, and author who devoted his life to preaching throughout England.

== Life ==
About 1668, he settled at Tytherton, Wiltshire, and published about 1681 A Plain and Candid of the Nature, Uses, and Doses of experienced. Medicines. In 1670, he commenced preaching. In August 1670, while at prayer in a meeting at Claverham, Somerset, he was violently dragged by the justices through the gallery-rail and much injured. He was also fined £2 a month for non-attendance at church. He received a commission to travel, and between September 1670 and October 1672 he held four hundred meetings. He returned home only on two occasions. On one he lay ill and his life was despaired of for two months, on the other a favourite child died.

After his return to Bristol, Marshall worked hard to counteract the divisions made by John Story and John Wilkinson, who had called the new discipline of the society forms and idols. He took part with Fax in a great meeting at Bristol in 1677 at the house of Rogers, another separatist. He lost much property in fines for tithes, and in 1682 was prosecuted by Townshend, vicar of Tytherton, and committed to the Fleet, where he remained two years. He wrote while there A Tender Visitation in the Love of God to towns and villages. He settled in Winchester and London, and continued his labours. His last journey was to Bristol at the being of 1698. On his return he fell ill, and was moved to the house of John Podley, Southwark, where, after four months, he died of consumption, 15 November 1698. He was buried in Bunhill Fields.

== Family ==
On 6 May 1662, he married Hannah, daughter of Edward Prince, ironmonger, of Bristol. She also became a zealous Quaker, and in 1664 they were both committed to prison for attending Quaker meetings.
