= Edward Vibart =

Edward Daniel Hamilton Vibart was a British military officer of the British East India Company, best known as a witness and chronicler of the Indian Rebellion of 1857, called by the British the "Sepoy Mutiny". At the time of the rebellion, Vibart was 19 years old, and a company commander in the 54th Bengal Native Infantry. Vibart's observations provide some of the best records of the violence committed by both sides during the rebellion.

Vibart's father, Major Edward Vibart, served in the 2nd Bengal Cavalry, and was executed on 1 July 1857 while being held prisoner by the rebels following his capture during the massacre at Kanpur on 27 June.

== Works ==
- Edward Vibart (1898). The Sepoy Mutiny as Seen by a Subaltern: from Delhi to Lucknow. London: Smith, Elder & Co.
