= Premachandra de Silva =

Personal information
- Full name: Dandeniya Premachandra de Silva
- Role: Batsman
- Relatives: Hemachandra de Silva (brother); Somachandra de Silva (brother)

Career statistics
Competition	First-class
Matches	12
Runs scored	328
Batting average	16.40
100s/50s	0/2
Top score	60
Balls bowled	34
Wickets	1
Bowling average	11.00
5 wickets in innings	0
10 wickets in match	0
Best bowling	1/4
Catches/stumpings	2/–
- Source: Cricinfo, 6 September 2018

Dandeniya Premachandra de Silva (also known as D. P. de Silva) is a former Ceylonese cricketer. He was a middle order batsman who represented Ceylon in first-class cricket from 1962 to 1968.

He was educated at Mahinda College, Galle, where he started his cricket career. He toured India in 1964-65 with the Ceylon team, playing in one of the three unofficial Tests. His highest first-class score was 60 when he opened the batting and top-scored for the Ceylon Board President's XI against Hyderabad Blues in 1966–67.

He was a heavy scorer in domestic cricket in Ceylon. In a match in the Government Services league in July 1959 he scored 276 out of a team total of 925. In 1967–68, playing for Nomads in the P Sara Trophy, he set a record for the highest run aggregate for a season.

Premachandra is the second of four Dandeniya de Silva brothers. His elder brother Hemachandra was also a Ceylonese first class cricketer. His younger brother Somachandra played Test cricket for Sri Lanka and later became the Chairman of Sri Lanka Cricket. After complaints by the match umpires, Premachandra and Hemachandra were suspended for 12 months in May 1965 for misbehaviour during a P Sara Trophy match.

In September 2018, he was one of 49 former Sri Lankan cricketers felicitated by Sri Lanka Cricket, to honour them for their services to cricket before Sri Lanka became a full member of the International Cricket Council (ICC).
