= 2001–02 Busta Cup =

Cricket tournament

- Dates: 25 January – 11 March 2002
- Administrator: WICB
- Cricket format: First-class (four-day)
- Tournament format: Round-robin
- Champions: Jamaica (6th title)
- Participants: 8
- Matches: 28
- Most runs: (Grenada) Devon Smith (750)
- Most wickets: (Guyana) Mahendra Nagamootoo (41)

The 2001–02 Busta Cup was the 36th edition of what is now the Regional Four Day Competition, the domestic first-class cricket competition for the countries of the West Indies Cricket Board (WICB). It was played from 25 January to 8 March 2002.

Eight teams contested the competition, which was played as a round-robin. The six regular teams of West Indian domestic cricket (Barbados, Guyana, Jamaica, the Leeward Islands, Trinidad and Tobago, and the Windward Islands) were joined by a development team (West Indies B) and an invited overseas team (Bangladesh A). Jamaica finished undefeated on the top of the table, claiming a sixth domestic first-class title. The Busta Cup was followed by a brief knockout competition called the Busta International Shield. It was played from 15 March to 7 April, featuring the top four teams from the Busta Cup, and was won by Guyana.

== Points table ==
Team	Pld	W	L	LWF	DWF	DLF	Pts
Jamaica	7	6	0	0	0	1	75
Guyana	7	4	2	0	0	1	51
Leeward Islands	7	3	2	0	1	1	45
Trinidad and Tobago	7	2	2	0	2	1	39
Barbados	7	3	3	0	0	1	39
Windward Islands	7	2	3	0	1	1	33
Bangladesh A	7	1	4	1	1	0	22
(Cricket West Indies) West Indies B	7	1	5	0	1	0	18
Source: CricketArchive

Key

- W – Outright win (12 points)
- L – Outright loss (0 points)
- LWF – Lost match, but won first innings (4 points)
- DWF – Drawn, but won first innings (6 points)
- DLF – Drawn, but lost first innings (3 points)
- Pts – Total points

== Statistics ==
=== Most runs ===
The top five run-scorers are included in this table, listed by runs scored and then by batting average.

Player	Team	Runs	Inns	Avg	Highest	100s	50s
Devon Smith	Windward Islands	750	13	62.50	143	1	7
Stuart Williams	Leeward Islands	722	13	72.20	195	2	4
Junior Murray	Windward Islands	642	12	53.50	125	4	1
Imran Jan	Trinidad and Tobago	528	14	40.61	110	1	4
Runako Morton	Leeward Islands	516	10	64.50	104	2	4

=== Most wickets ===
The top five wicket-takers are listed in this table, listed by wickets taken and then by bowling average.

Player	Team	Overs	Wkts	Ave	5	10	BBI
Mahendra Nagamootoo	Trinidad and Tobago	334.0	41	20.19	2	1	6/61
Kerry Jeremy	Leeward Islands	267.4	39	17.35	3	0	6/33
Adam Sanford	Leeward Islands	285.1	37	24.24	1	0	5/80
Gareth Breese	Jamaica	276.2	35	19.45	3	1	6/57
Marlon Black	Trinidad and Tobago	248.1	33	23.15	1	0	5/76

== See also ==
- 2001–02 Red Stripe Bowl
