= Venris Bennett =

Bahamian cricketer (born 1957)

Personal information
- Full name: Venris Kahni Bennett
- Born: 21 December 1957 (age 68); Bahamas
- Batting: Right-handed
- Bowling: Right-arm (unknown)

International information
- National side: Bahamas

Career statistics
Competition	T20
Matches	1
Runs scored	1
Batting average	–
100s/50s	–/–
Top score	1*
Balls bowled	6
Wickets	–
Bowling average	–
5 wickets in innings	–
10 wickets in match	–
Best bowling	–
Catches/stumpings	1/–
- Source: Cricinfo, 28 May 2010

Venris Kahni Bennett (born 21 December 1957) is a former Bahamian cricketer. Bennett is a right-handed batsman who was a right-arm bowler, although his style is unknown. Bennett represented the Bahamas national cricket team in 5 matches.

Bennett made his debut for the Bahamas in the 2002 ICC Americas Championship against the United States. Bennett also played for the Bahamas in the 2003/04 Americas Affiliates Championship, 2004 ICC Americas Championship and the 2006 ICC Americas Championship Division Two.

Bennett made his only Twenty20 appearance for the Bahamas against the Cayman Islands in the 1st round of the 2006 Stanford 20/20. Bennett scored 1 run and bowled an over that cost 17 runs. This was Bennett's final appearance for the Bahamas.
