= Marshalite =

Type of traffic signal

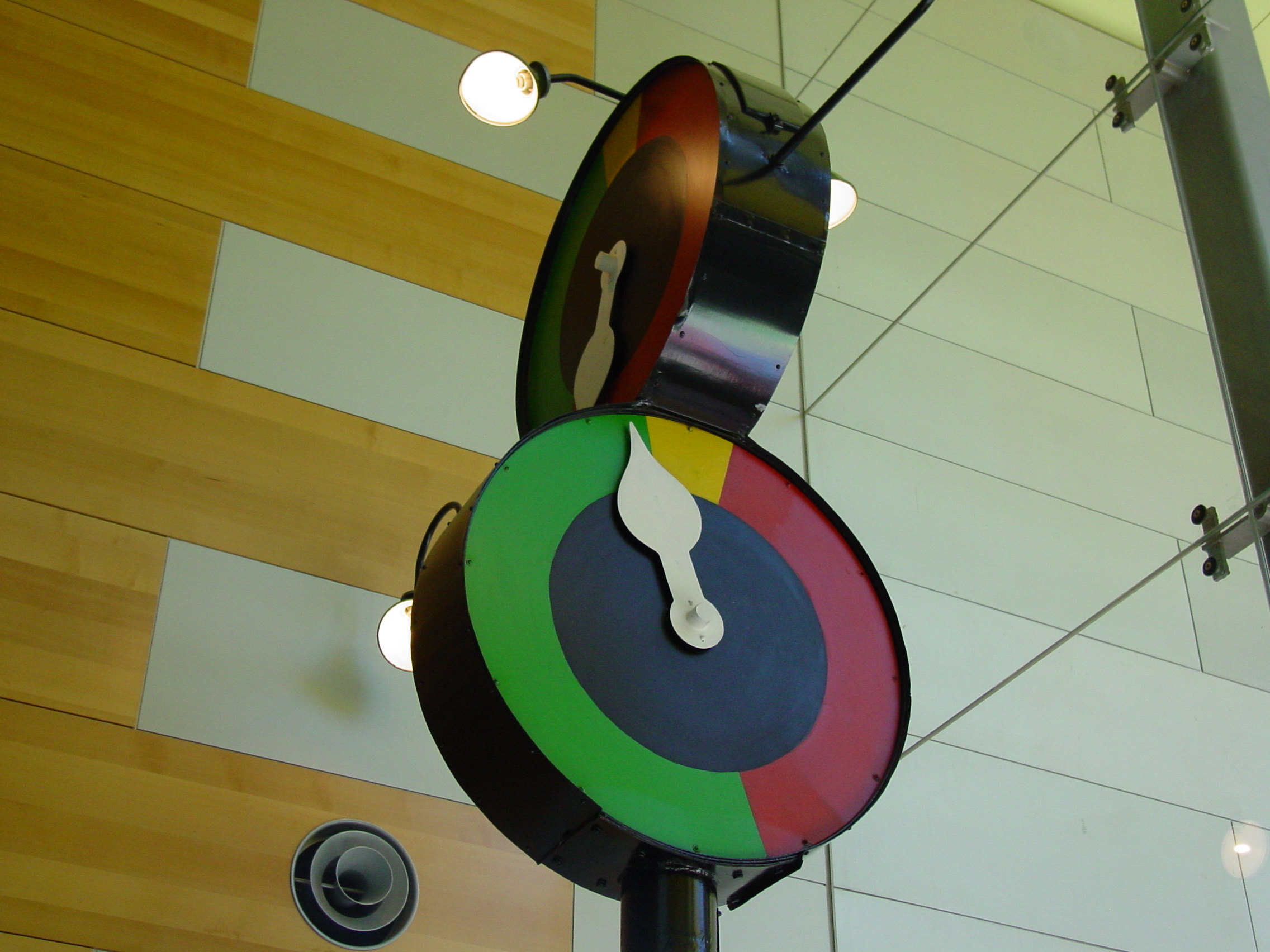
A Marshalite signal at the Melbourne Museum.

The Marshalite was a form of rotary traffic signal that was designed in 1936 by an Australian Charles Marshall (1864 - Dunedin, New Zealand - 3 April 1953, Mornington, Victoria, Australia), founder of the Fitzroy firm of Charles Marshall Pty. Ltd.

The Marshalite signal consisted of dials facing each street at an intersection, with a rotating hand pointing to coloured sections that denoted whether traffic in either direction should proceed, prepare to stop, or stop, and how much longer that phase had to go. Variations existed for pedestrian crossings, with additional text instructing people to "Walk" or "Don't Walk".

The first experimental model was erected in 1937 at the corner of Gertrude and Brunswick streets, Fitzroy, but was removed when its legality came into question. After 1945, Mashalite signals were installed at a number of locations in metropolitan Melbourne, starting with the intersection of Brunswick and Johnston streets, Fitzroy At the intersection of Whitehorse and Union roads, Surrey Hills, the clock was used in conjunction with conventional traffic lights, so that the point of change was absolute and unambiguous. The last Marshalite to operate was situated on the Nepean Highway.

A similar system was used in The Netherlands, Vienna and West Germany. In Germany it was called "Heuer-Ampel", after the engineer Josef Heuer, and was used in a number of places until 1972, when a change in traffic laws outlawed them. For historic reasons, an unused one is still in place in Bochum.
