= Sukhjinder Rana =

Indian-Canadian cricketer

Personal information
- Born: 17 February 1969 (age 57); Punjab, India
- Batting: Left-handed
- Bowling: Left-arm medium

International information
- National side: Canada (1994–2002)
- Source: CricketArchive, 2 February 2016

Sukhjinder Rana (born 17 February 1969) is a former international cricketer who represented the Canadian national side between 1994 and 2002. He was born in India.

A left-arm medium-pace bowler, Rana made his international debut for Canada in September 1994, in a match against the United States in New York City. In October 1996, he played in the Shell/Sandals Trophy, the West Indian domestic competition in which Canada were competing as a guest team. He took three wickets from his four matches, including 2/23 against Trinidad and Tobago. Early the following year, Rana was selected in the Canadian squad for the 1997 ICC Trophy in Malaysia, the qualification tournament for the 1999 World Cup. He featured in six of his team's seven matches, and took seven wickets, behind only Barry Seebaran for Canada. However, five of those came in the same match, against Fiji, where he finished with figures of 5/29 from 9.1 overs and was named man of the match. After the 1997 ICC Trophy, Rana made only occasional appearances for Canada, playing games against Bermuda, the Netherlands, and India (the last of those being a warm-up match prior to the 1997 Sahara Cup). His last international matches came at the 2002 Americas Championship in Argentina.
