= Michael Wight =

Personal information
- Born: 21 November 1964 (age 61); Cayman Islands
- Batting: Right-handed
- Bowling: Right-arm leg spin
- Role: Bowler

Career statistics
Competition	List A	Twenty20
Matches	4	2
Runs scored	13	12
Batting average	4.33	12.00
100s/50s	0/0	0/0
Top score	10	12
Balls bowled	156	22
Wickets	2	1
Bowling average	89.00	22.00
5 wickets in innings	0	0
10 wickets in match	0	0
Best bowling	1/25	1/13
Catches/stumpings	2/–	0/–
- Source: CricketArchive, 23 September 2007

Michael Wight (born 21 November 1964) is a Cayman Islands cricketer. A right-handed batsman and leg spin bowler, he has played for the Cayman Islands national cricket team since the year 2000.

== Career ==
Wight made his debut for the Cayman Islands in August 2000, playing against the USA in the Americas Championship at the Maple Leaf Cricket Club in King City, Ontario. Later in the year, he made his List A debut, playing for the Caymans in the Red Stripe Bowl against Guyana.

He again played in the Americas Championship in 2002 and 2004, before playing in the repêchage tournament for the 2005 ICC Trophy in Kuala Lumpur in February 2005.

The following year, he played against the Bahamas and Trinidad & Tobago in the Stanford 20/20, before again playing in the Americas Championship in King City. He most recently represented the Cayman Islands in Division Three of the World Cricket League in Darwin, Australia.

== Family ==
Wight comes from a cricketing family. Three of his brothers; Christopher, David and Philip have all played cricket for the Cayman Islands. His grandfather Oscar played for Guyana, whilst his great-uncle Vibart played Test cricket for the West Indies. With children named Taylor and Payten. He also has a wife named Judy .
