= Dennis Pilgrim =

Personal information
- Born: 15 September 1972 (age 54); Bermuda
- Batting: Unknown
- Bowling: Unknown

International information
- National side: Bermuda

Domestic team information
- Years: Team
- 2000/01: Bermuda

Career statistics
| Competition | List A |
|---|---|
| Matches | 4 |
| Runs scored | 20 |
| Batting average | 10.00 |
| 100s/50s | –/– |
| Top score | 11* |
| Balls bowled | 102 |
| Wickets | 1 |
| Bowling average | 65.00 |
| 5 wickets in innings | – |
| 10 wickets in match | – |
| Best bowling | 1/9 |
| Catches/stumpings | –/– |
- Source: Cricinfo, 31 March 2013

Dennis Pilgrim (born 15 September 1972) is a former Bermudian cricketer. Pilgrim's batting and bowling styles are unknown.

Pilgrim made his debut for Bermuda in the 2000 Americas Cricket Cup against Argentina, with him making two further appearances in that competition against the Cayman Islands and Canada. He made his List A debut for Bermuda in October 2000 against the Leeward Islands in the 2000/01 Red Stripe Bowl, with him making three further List A appearances in that tournament, against the Cayman Islands, the Windward Islands and Guyana. He scored a total of 20 runs in his four List A matches with a high score of 11 not out, while with the ball he also took a single wicket. In July 2001, Pilgrim played in the 2001 ICC Trophy in Canada, making two appearances against Hong Kong and Namibia. The following year he made four appearances in the 2002 ICC Americas Championship against the Cayman Islands, Canada, the Bahamas and the United States.
