= Jermaine Warner =

Bermudian cricketer

Personal information
- Full name: Jermaine Warner
- Born: 16 April 1971 (age 55); Bermuda
- Batting: Unknown
- Bowling: Unknown

Domestic team information
- Years: Team
- 2000/01: Bermuda

Career statistics
| Competition | List A |
|---|---|
| Matches | 3 |
| Runs scored | 6 |
| Batting average | 3.00 |
| 100s/50s | –/– |
| Top score | 6 |
| Balls bowled | – |
| Wickets | – |
| Bowling average | – |
| 5 wickets in innings | – |
| 10 wickets in match | – |
| Best bowling | – |
| Catches/stumpings | 2/– |
- Source: Cricinfo, 31 March 2013

Jermaine Warner (born 16 April 1971) is a former Bermudian cricketer. Warner's batting style is unknown.

Warner was selected as part of Bermuda's squad for the 2000 Americas Cricket Cup, but did not feature in any matches in the tournament. Later in October 2000, he made his debut for Bermuda in a List A match against the Leeward Islands in the 2000/01 Red Stripe Bowl, with him making two further List A appearances in that tournament against the Cayman Islands and Guyana. He scored six runs in his three List A matches.
