= Keith Hibbert =

Jamaican cricketer

Personal information
- Full name: Keith Hugh Hibbert
- Born: 14 June 1980 (age 46); Saint Catherine Parish, Jamaica
- Batting: Right-handed
- Role: Wicket-keeper

Domestic team information
- Years: Team
- 2000–2009: Jamaica
- 2003: University of the West Indies
- Source: CricketArchive, 1 January 2016

Keith Hugh Hibbert (born 14 June 1980) is a former Jamaican cricketer who played for the Jamaican national side in West Indian domestic cricket, as well as briefly for the University of the West Indies team.

Hibbert made his senior debut for Jamaica in September 2000, in a friendly one-day game against South Africa A. In the 2000–01 Red Stripe Bowl, which began the following month, he hit 198 runs in five matches, finishing as Jamaica's leading run-scorer (and second in the competition behind Junior Murray). His highest score of the tournament was 93 not out against Canada, and his other innings of note was 55 against the United States. In his 25-match List A career, which ended in 2008, Hibbert scored no further half-centuries.

After the outstanding start to his limited-overs career, Hibbert made his first-class debut for Jamaica in the 2000–01 Busta Cup. In 2002, after two strong domestic seasons, he was chosen to tour England with West Indies A, playing matches against English county teams. During the 2003–04 Carib Beer Cup, Hibbert scored his only first-class century, an innings of 102 not out against the Windward Islands. He finished the season with 368 runs from eight matches, with only Tamar Lambert, David Bernard, and Chris Gayle scoring more runs for Jamaica. Hibbert had begun his career as a wicket-keeper, but was later replaced by Carlton Baugh in that role, instead playing as a specialist batsman. His batting form declined in the mid-2000s, and he made his final appearances during the 2008–09 season, aged 28. Other than the 2003–04 Red Stripe Bowl, in which he represented the University of the West Indies in a single match, Hibbert spent his entire domestic career with Jamaica.
