= Nixon McLean =

West Indian cricketer (born 1973)

Personal information
- Full name: Nixon Alexei McNamara McLean
- Born: 20 July 1973 (age 53); Stubbs, Saint Vincent
- Batting: Left-handed
- Bowling: Right-arm fast-medium
- Role: Bowler

International information
- National side: West Indies
- Test debut (cap 220): 29 January 1998 v England
- Last Test: 17 March 2001 v South Africa
- ODI debut (cap 78): 6 December 1996 v Australia
- Last ODI: 13 February 2003 v New Zealand

Domestic team information
- Years: Team
- 1992/93–2000/01: Windward Islands
- 1998–1999: Hampshire
- 2001/02–2003/04: KwaZulu-Natal
- 2002/03–2006: St Vincent & the Grenadines
- 2003-2005: Somerset
- 2005/06: Canterbury

Career statistics
| Competition | Test | ODI | FC | LA |
|---|---|---|---|---|
| Matches | 19 | 45 | 149 | 185 |
| Runs scored | 368 | 314 | 2,527 | 1,356 |
| Batting average | 12.26 | 12.07 | 13.51 | 13.69 |
| 100s/50s | 0/0 | 0/1 | 0/4 | 0/1 |
| Top score | 46 | 50* | 76 | 50* |
| Balls bowled | 3,299 | 2,120 | 26,258 | 8,094 |
| Wickets | 44 | 46 | 506 | 229 |
| Bowling average | 42.56 | 37.58 | 27.51 | 27.26 |
| 5 wickets in innings | 0 | 0 | 19 | 2 |
| 10 wickets in match | 0 | 0 | 3 | 0 |
| Best bowling | 3/53 | 3/21 | 7/28 | 5/26 |
| Catches/stumpings | 5/– | 8/– | 41/– | 32/– |
- Source: ESPNcricinfo, 8 August 2015

Nixon Alexei McNamara McLean (born 20 July 1973) is a West Indian cricketer from St. Vincent and the Grenadines. He featured in the role of a right-arm fast-medium bowler who played both Tests and ODIs for the West Indies. McLean also featured for the Windward Islands, Hampshire, KwaZulu-Natal, Somerset and the Canterbury Wizards in his cricketing career.

== Playing career ==
He made his ODI debut for the Windies in 1996, notching figures of two for 33, against Australia at Melbourne. During 1998 McLean joined up with English side Hampshire where he stayed for a sum of two seasons. With Hampshire, he picked up 51 limited overs wickets along with 108 first class wickets which came at an average of under 30. McLean was also an essential part, as the tournament's leading wicket taker, of the Windward Islands' victorious 2000-01 Red Stripe Bowl campaign.

He later joined up, in 2001, with South African club KwaZulu-Natal. During his debut season he picked up 44 first class wickets at and average of 16.13 and 15 List A wickets at an average of 15.33. He thus played an essential part in Natal winning both the Standard Bank Cup and the Supersport Series, South Africa's domestic ODI and four day tournaments, in that 2001–02 season. He then stayed with the club for another successive season. McLean's impressive performances for Natal earned him a place in the Windies' World Cup 2003 squad.

During 2003 McLean joined up with Somerset, where he stayed for three seasons. With a best showing of six for 79, he eventually claimed 120 first class wickets at an average of 29.22 in 33 matches for that club. He later joined New Zealand side Canterbury Wizards in 2005.

== Later work ==
After calling an end to his playing days, McLean joined the board of the West Indies Retired Players Foundation, a foundation designed to improve the game on a domestic level through the help of former players. McLean also serves as the current vice president of the West Indies Players' Association.
