= Oscar Owen =

Caymanian cricketer (born 1967)

Personal information
- Full name: Oscar Owen
- Born: 1 February 1967 (age 59)
- Batting: Unknown

Domestic team information
- Years: Team
- 2000/01: Cayman Islands

Career statistics
Competition	List A
Matches	2
Runs scored	1
Batting average	–
100s/50s	–/–
Top score	1*
Balls bowled	–
Wickets	–
Bowling average	–
5 wickets in innings	–
10 wickets in match	–
Best bowling	–
Catches/stumpings	1/–
- Source: Cricinfo, 3 September 2014

Oscar Owen (born 1 February 1967) is a former Caymanian cricketer.

A batsman of unknown handedness, Owen made two appearances in List A cricket for the Cayman Islands in the 2000/01 Red Stripe Bowl, playing against Bermuda and the Windward Islands. He scored a single run across both matches. Prior to these matches, he had been selected in the Cayman Islands squad for the 2000 Americas Cricket Cup, but made no appearances during the tournament.
