= Michael Crane (cricketer) =

Bermudian cricketer (born 1982)

Personal information
- Born: 10 July 1982 (age 44); Bermuda

Career statistics
Competition	First-class
Matches	1
Runs scored	8
Batting average	8.00
100s/50s	0/0
Top score	8*
Balls bowled	90
Wickets	2
Bowling average	46.00
5 wickets in innings	0
10 wickets in match	0
Best bowling	1/34
Catches/stumpings	0/–
- Source: Cricinfo, 13 October 2011

Michael Crane (born 10 July 1982) is a Bermudian cricketer. He has played one first-class match for Bermuda to date, against the USA in the 2004 Intercontinental Cup. He also represented his country in the 2004 ICC Americas Championship.
