= Christopher Wight =

Cricketer from the Cayman Islands

Personal information
- Full name: Christopher Wight
- Born: July 3, 1959 (age 67); Cayman Islands
- Role: Wicket-keeper

Career statistics
Competition	List A
Matches	4
Runs scored	77
Batting average	19.25
100s/50s	0/0
Top score	30
Balls bowled	12
Wickets	0
Bowling average	–
5 wickets in innings	–
10 wickets in match	–
Best bowling	–
Catches/stumpings	3/1
- Source: CricketArchive, 23 September 2007

Christopher Wight (born 3 July 1959) is a former cricketer from the Cayman Islands. A wicket-keeper, he played for the Cayman Islands national cricket team from 2000 to 2004.

== Career ==
Wight made his debut for the Cayman Islands in August 2000 when he played against the USA and Bermuda in the Americas Championship at the Maple Leaf Cricket Club in King City, Ontario. Later in the year, he played in four List A matches as part of the Red Stripe Bowl in Antigua. His other two international tournaments were the 2002 Americas Championship in Buenos Aires and the 2004 Americas Championship in Bermuda.

== Family ==
Christopher's parents are Derek and Marguerite Wight. He has four brothers (Brian, his twin David, Michael and Philip) and five sisters (Sandra, Deborah, Ann- Marie, Wendy and Jennifer). He came from a cricketing family. His twin brother David also played cricket for the Cayman Islands, as did two other brothers; Michael and Philip. His grandfather Oscar played for British Guiana, and his great-uncle Vibart played Test cricket for the West Indies.
