= Keith Wainwright (cricketer) =

Bermudian cricketer

Personal information
- Full name: Keith Wainwright
- Born: Unknown
- Batting: Unknown
- Bowling: Unknown

Domestic team information
- Years: Team
- 1998/99: Bermuda

Career statistics
Competition	List A
Matches	3
Runs scored	15
Batting average	5.00
100s/50s	–/–
Top score	8
Balls bowled	66
Wickets	1
Bowling average	64.00
5 wickets in innings	–
10 wickets in match	–
Best bowling	1/19
Catches/stumpings	1/–
- Source: Cricinfo, 31 March 2013

Keith Wainwright (date of birth unknown) is a former Bermudian cricketer. Wainwright's batting and bowling styles are unknown.

Wainwright made his debut for Bermuda in a List A match against Trinidad and Tobago in the 1998–99 Red Stripe Bowl, and made two further List A appearances in that tournament, against the Windward Islands and Guyana. He scored a total of 15 runs in his three List A matches, at an average of 5.00 and with a high score of 8. With the ball he also took a single wicket.
