= Somachandra de Silva =

Sri Lankan cricketer (1942–2025)

Somachandra de Silva සෝමචන්ද්‍ර ද සිල්වා சோமசந்திர டி சில்வா
Personal information
- Full name: Dandeniyage Somachandra de Silva
- Born: 11 June 1942; Galle, British Ceylon
- Died: 15 December 2025 (aged 83); London, England
- Nickname: DS
- Batting: Right-handed
- Bowling: Right-arm leg break googly
- Relatives: Hemachandra de Silva (brother); Premachandra de Silva (brother)

International information
- National side: Sri Lanka
- Test debut (cap 2): 17 Feb 1982 v England
- Last Test: 23 Aug 1984 v England
- ODI debut (cap 1): 7 June 1975 v West Indies
- Last ODI: 27 February 1985 v West Indies

Career statistics
Competition	Test	ODI
Matches	12	41
Runs scored	406	371
Batting average	21.36	19.52
100s/50s	0/2	0/0
Top score	61	37*
Balls bowled	3,031	2,076
Wickets	37	32
Bowling average	36.40	48.65
5 wickets in innings	1	0
10 wickets in match	0	0
Best bowling	5/59	3/29
Catches/stumpings	5/0	5/0
- Source: Cricinfo, 14 August 2016

Dandeniyage Somachandra de Silva (11 June 1942 – 15 December 2025), also known as D. S. de Silva, was a Sri Lankan cricketer, who played Test and One Day International cricket in the 1970s and 1980s. He was the first ODI cap for Sri Lanka, second Test cap for Sri Lanka and was part of Sri Lanka's first Test team. He bowled leg spin, and on the tour of Pakistan in 1982 he became the first Sri Lankan bowler to take five wickets in a Test innings. He was also the oldest player to lead Sri Lanka in Test cricket during a Test tour to New Zealand in 1983. He is also regarded as the longest serving spinner to have played for Sri Lanka and considered one of the finest leg spinners to have emerged from Sri Lanka.

== Biography ==
De Silva hailed from a tiny village in Unawatuna and was initially educated at Mahinda College, Galle. Somachandra's elder brothers D. H. de Silva and D. P. de Silva were also Ceylonese first-class cricketers. Somachandra pursued his cricket career when he moved from Galle to Moratuwa as a schoolboy. He took up the sport of cricket when he studied at the Prince of Wales' College, Moratuwa.

He made his debut for Ceylon in 1966-67 and played in most Sri Lankan teams thereafter until the mid-1980s. He also played in the M. J. Gopalan Trophy, a first class cricket tournament initiated between Ceylon and Madras. He was part of Sri Lanka's first World Cup team during the inaugural edition of the ICC Cricket World Cup in 1975. He made his ODI debut on 7 June at the 1975 World Cup against West Indies which was also Sri Lanka's first ever ODI appearance. He picked up the most number of wickets among spin bowlers during the 1975 World Cup with four scalps, in a tournament which was dominated by seamers.

After the World Cup in 1975 De Silva moved to England and played cricket in Lincolnshire for Appleby Frodingham in 1975 and then Scunthorpe Town from 1976 to 1979, becoming their first ever overseas professional. In his first match for the Scunthorpe Town cricket club, he took 4 for 28 and scored 38 to help Scunthorpe win. By the end of the 1976 season, De Silva took 99 wickets, a league record that still stands to this day as the most wickets in a single season in the Lincolnshire League and he also won the league bowling award in 1978 and 1979.

De Silva was also part of Sri Lankan team in the 1979 cricket World Cup where Sri Lanka recorded their first top-level international victory, beating India by 47 runs. De Silva took three wickets for 29, including Dilip Vengsarkar and Mohinder Amarnath, as India crashed to 191 all out. He took his best first-class figures on the 1979 tour of England when he took 4 for 13 and 8 for 46 in the innings victory over Oxford University.

When Sri Lanka was finally awarded Test status, de Silva was nearing his forties, which naturally shortened his career. He made his test debut against England in Sri Lanka's very first test match at the age of 39 years, 251 days and became the oldest ever test debutant for Sri Lanka. His test debut came at a time when he was way past his prime years and his first test wicket was David Gower. However, he played in Sri Lanka's first 12 Tests, before retiring at 42. He took his best figures in the second test against Pakistan at Iqbal Stadium, Faisalabad, in March 1982, when he had figures of 4 for 103 and 5 for 59 and the match was drawn with Sri Lanka close to victory. He became the first ever Sri Lankan bowler to take a test fifer and also became the oldest ever Sri Lankan bowler to take a fifer in an innings of a test match at the age of 39 years and 276 days.

He captained the Sri Lankan cricket team for two Tests in 1983, as the regular captain, Duleep Mendis, missed the series in New Zealand due to injury. He also became the oldest ever international captain for Sri Lanka as he made his captaincy debut (stand in captain) in that test series against New Zealand at the age of 40 years and 266 days. De Silva made two half-centuries as captain and took three wickets with tight bowling on pitches that did not suit his bowling style. However, New Zealand won the series 2–0. He also became the oldest player to captain Sri Lanka in an ODI at the age of 40 years and 264 days against New Zealand.

De Silva played his last test match against England at Lord's in 1984. However, it wasn't a happy outing for him in his last ever test match appearance as he declared himself unfit to play when he turned his ankle while warming up in the nets. Despite his ankle injury, the team management was keen and desperate to have in the playing XI given his experience and wicket taking abilities. He was somehow convinced by the team management to play in the test match whereas he toiled hard and bowled a marathon spell of 45 overs, conceding just 85 runs, taking two crucial wickets including 16 maiden overs. He was however not able to land the deliveries to the right length properly due to the ankle injury.

He also played at the 1985 World Championship of Cricket tournament which was held in Australia. It was his final international appearance playing for Sri Lanka. De Silva also played Minor Counties cricket for Lincolnshire and Shropshire between 1976 and 1983. Following his retirement from international cricket, he later played club cricket in Melbourne for about five years initially with Northshore Geelong and later turned up for Ringwood. He announced his retirement from all forms of cricket at the age of 49.

He later became a coach of the Sri Lankan cricket team and also coached the Sri Lanka Under 19 team. In December 2007, he was appointed the cricket advisor by the then Sri Lankan President Mahinda Rajapaksa with the intention of promoting the sport in war affected northern areas of Sri Lanka especially in Jaffna. He also served as schools cricket development officer at the Sri Lanka Cricket.

In 2009, he was appointed by the then sports minister Gamini Lokuge as the interim chairman of Sri Lanka Cricket and served in the position until 2012 for three years. During his tenure as chairman of Sri Lanka Cricket, Sri Lankan team performed well at international level whereas Sri Lanka reached the 2011 ICC Cricket World Cup final and 2012 ICC T20 World Cup final. Sri Lanka also reached number 3 position in ICC Men's Test Team Rankings under his tenure.

In 2014, he was also appointed by the Government of Sri Lanka as the Sri Lankan ambassador to Poland following the end of his three-year stint as SLC chairman.

== Death ==
De Silva died after a brief illness in London, England, on 15 December 2025, at the age of 83.

== Controversies ==
Question were raised regarding the construction of international cricket stadiums in Pallekele and Hambantota when he was the chairman of Sri Lanka Cricket Board. Political interference was alleged regarding the construction of Mahinda Rajapaksa International Cricket Stadium in 2009 but he denied the allegations.

In 2011, he was asked to resign by the then sports minister Mahindananda Aluthgamage due to corruption allegations within the SLC and accusations regarding Sri Lanka cricket spending on infrastructure facilities more than the budget to conduct the 2011 Cricket World Cup.
