= Vernon Dumas =

Dominican cricketer (born 1978)

Personal information
- Born: 27 May 1978 (age 48); Dominica
- Source: Cricinfo, 25 November 2020

Vernon Dumas (born 27 May 1978) is a Dominican cricketer. He played in eight first-class and four List A matches for the Windward Islands from 1997 to 2000.

== See also ==
- List of Windward Islands first-class cricketers
