= Dandeniya Hemachandra de Silva =

Sri Lankan cricketer

Hemachandra de Silva
- Born: Dandeniya Hemachandra de Silva; 5 November 1932; Galle, Sri Lanka
- Died: 25 April 2014 (aged 81); Melbourne, Victoria, Australia
- Other names: DH, Hema
- Occupations: Municipal Commissioner, Kandy Municipal Council, previously Assistant Charity Commissioner and subsequently Charity Commissioner, Colombo Municipal Council
- Known for: Cricket, Community Development

Dandeniya Hemachandra de Silva (5 November 1932 – 25 April 2014) was a Sri Lankan cricketer and senior local government official.

Commonly known as D.H. de Silva, he was educated at Mahinda College, Galle, and at the University of Peradeniya. He captained both his school cricket team and the university cricket team, before representing Nomads Sports Club and Sinhalese Sports Club in Sri Lankan cricket. He was a founding member of the Nomads Sports Club and captained the Nomads cricket team. An opening batsman, he played in two first-class matches, representing Ceylon in 1969 and State Services in 1973.

D.H. de Silva worked as the Charity Commissioner of the Colombo Municipal Council and later as the Municipal Commissioner of the Kandy Municipal Council. He also served as a cricket and tennis coach for the school children in Kandy district, before migrating to Australia. De Silva was the first cricket coach of the Sri Lankan cricketer Kumar Sangakkara. His younger brother Premachandra de Silva represented Ceylon and another younger brother, Somachandra de Silva, played Test cricket for Sri Lanka. Somachandra later became the chairman of Sri Lanka Cricket. De Silva died on 25 April 2014 in Melbourne, Australia, at the age of 81.
