= Charles Marshall (painter) =

English scene-painter (1806–1890)

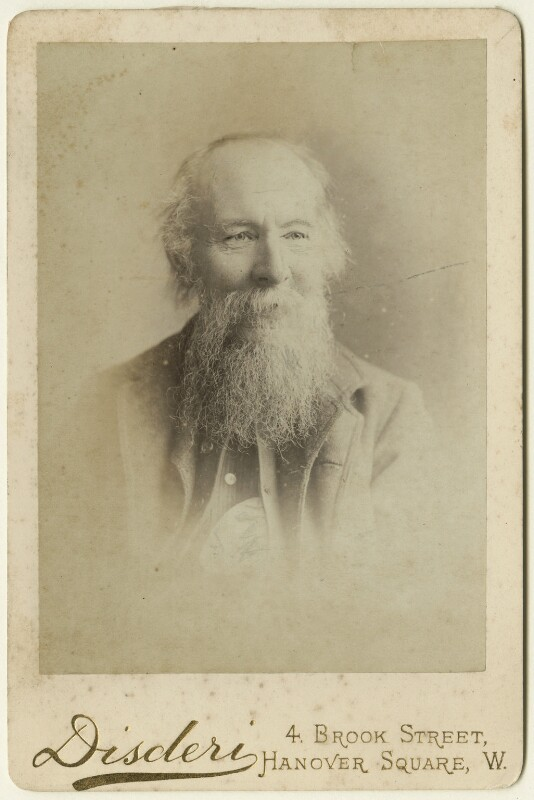
Photographic portrait, albumen cabinet card by Disdéri (1880s)

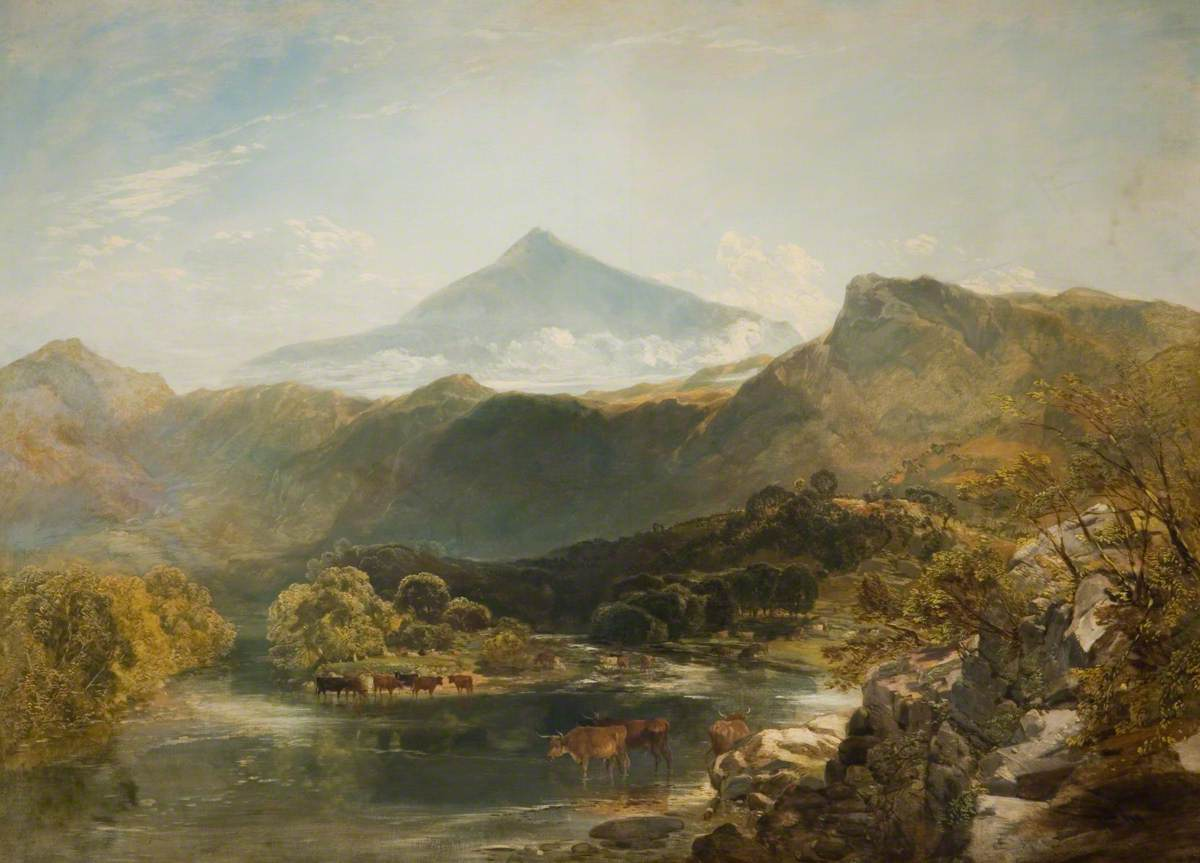
Ben Nevis and Mountain Stream (1855)

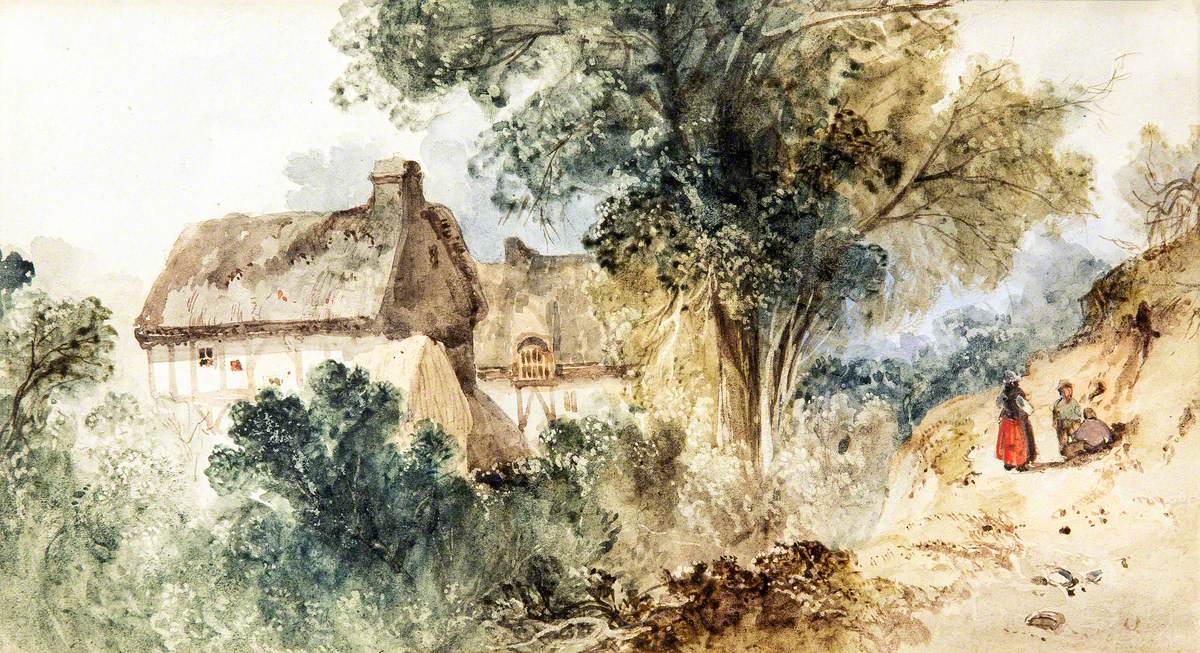
Landscape (c. 1860)

Charles Marshall RA (1806–1890) was an English scene-painter.

== Life ==
Charles Marshall, son of Nathan and Mary Marshall, was born on 31 December 1806. He studied oil painting under John Wilson, and at the age of eighteen received a gold medal from the Society of Arts. He became a pupil of Gaetano Marinari, the architectural scenic artist at Drury Lane Theatre, and subsequently developed into one of the most prominent and most successful scene-painters of the day.

Marshall was employed by Robert William Elliston and by David Osbaldiston at the Surrey Theatre, and by many other managers of theatres; but his chief successes were under the management of Macready at Covent Garden and Drury Lane. Among his most notable achievements was the scenery to Shakespeare's The Tempest, and As You Like It, and for the first production of Lord Lytton's plays. He was also very successful in plays such as Coriolanus or Virginius, which required a knowledge of classical architecture.

Marshall was the first to introduce the limelight on the stage, and originated and developed the 'transformation scene'. Generally speaking his scenery depended more on illusion than on solid pictorial effects, such as practised by Clarkson Stanfield and others. On the death of William Grieve in 1844, Marshall became scene-painter to the opera at Her Majesty's Theatre, and did much to assist Benjamin Lumley in the revival of the ballet.

He retired from this profession about 1858, and devoted the remainder of his active life to landscape-painting, which he had practised continuously, being a frequent exhibitor at the Royal Academy, British Institution, and Suffolk Street exhibitions. He also painted some panoramas of Napoleon's battles, such as The Overland Route, and contributed a diorama to illustrate the coronation of William IV. At the coronation of Victoria he had a share in the decorations of Westminster Abbey.

Marshall died at 7 Lewisham Head, Highgate, on 8 March 1890, in his eighty-fourth year.

=== Family ===
Charles Marshall married, on 15 February 1844, Anna Marin, daughter of James Kittermaster, MD, of Meriden, Warwickshire, by whom he left three children; of these two sons, Charles Marshall and Robert A. K. Marshall, also became artists.
