= David Wight (cricketer) =

Personal information
- Full name: David Wight
- Born: July 3, 1959 (age 67); Cayman Islands
- Role: All-rounder

Career statistics
Competition	List A
Matches	4
Runs scored	26
Batting average	8.66
100s/50s	0/0
Top score	18
Balls bowled	102
Wickets	3
Bowling average	21.66
5 wickets in innings	0
10 wickets in match	0
Best bowling	3/38
Catches/stumpings	0/–
- Source: CricketArchive, 23 September 2007

David Wight (born 3 July 1959) is a Caymanian politician and former cricket player who played for the Cayman Islands national cricket team from 2000 to 2004.

== Career ==
Wight first played for the Cayman Islands in August 2000, when he played against the USA, Bermuda and Canada in the Americas Championship at the Maple Leaf Cricket Club in King City, Ontario. Later that year, he played four List A matches as part of the Red Stripe Bowl in Antigua.

He played in two further Americas Championship tournaments for the Cayman Islands; the 2002 event in Buenos Aires, and the 2004 tournament in Bermuda.

== Family ==
David's parents are Derek Wight and Marguerite Wight. He has four brothers (Brian, his twin Christopher, Michael and Philip) and five sisters (Sandra, Deborah, Ann- Marie, Wendy and Jennifer). Wight came from a cricketing family. His twin brother Christopher also played cricket for the Cayman Islands, as did two other brothers; Michael and Philip. His grandfather Oscar Wight played for British Guiana and his great-uncle Vibart played Test cricket for the West Indies.
