= Philip Wight =

Cayman Islands cricketer (born 1965)

Personal information
- Full name: Philip Wight
- Born: 12 December 1965 (age 60); Cayman Islands
- Role: Batsman

Career statistics
Competition	List A
Matches	1
Runs scored	0
Batting average	0.00
100s/50s	0/0
Top score	0
Balls bowled	12
Wickets	0
Bowling average	–
5 wickets in innings	–
10 wickets in match	–
Best bowling	–
Catches/stumpings	0/–
- Source: CricketArchive, 25 September 2007

Philip Wight (born 12 December 1965) is a cricketer. The great-nephew of West Indian Test cricketer Vibart Wight, he has played for the Cayman Islands national cricket team since 2000.

== Career ==
Philip Wight made his debut for the Cayman Islands in the 2000 Americas Championship at the Maple Leaf Cricket Club in King City, Ontario, playing against the USA. His brothers Christopher, David and Michael also made their debuts in the same match. Later in the year, he played his only List A match against Guyana in the Red Stripe Bowl.

He played in the following two Americas Championship tournaments; the 2002 event in Buenos Aires and the 2004 event in Bermuda. In February 2005, he played in the repêchage tournament for the 2005 ICC Trophy in Kuala Lumpur.

He most recently played for the Cayman Islands in August 2006 against Canada and Argentina in the Americas Championship in King City.
