= Oscar Wight =

Guyanese cricketer (1906–1986)

Personal information
- Born: 10 August 1906; Georgetown, British Guiana
- Died: 13 September 1986 (aged 80); Suffolk, England
- Source: Cricinfo, 19 November 2020

Oscar Wight (10 August 1906 – 13 September 1986) was a Guyanese cricketer. He played in fifteen first-class matches for British Guiana from 1926 to 1938.

== See also ==
- List of Guyanese representative cricketers
