= Keno Mason =

Trinidad and Tobago cricketer (born 1972)

Personal information
- Full name: Keno Anthony Mason
- Born: 13 November 1972 (age 53); Barataria, Trinidad
- Batting: Right-handed
- Role: Wicket-keeper

Domestic team information
- Years: Team
- 1993–2002: Trinidad and Tobago
- Source: ESPNCricinfo, 27 December 2015

Keno Anthony Mason (born 13 November 1972) is a former Trinidadian cricketer who represented Trinidad and Tobago in West Indian domestic cricket. He played as a wicket-keeper.

Mason made his first-class debut for Trinidad and Tobago in January 1993, in a Red Stripe Cup game against the Windward Islands. His limited-overs debut came the following month, against the Leeward Islands. Mason became Trinidad and Tobago's first-choice wicket-keeper after the retirements of Hermat Gangapersad and David Williams, and often substituted for Williams when he was on international duty with the West Indies. His final appearances in top-level West Indian domestic cricket came during the 2001–02 season. Mason played 42 first-class matches in total, and scored eleven half-centuries, with a highest score of 84 against the Windward Islands in January 1995. He also made 24 limited-overs appearances, although he scored only a single half-century in that format, making 68 against Barbados in February 1994.
