= Kerry Jeremy =

West Indian cricketer (born 1980)

Personal information
- Full name: Kerry Clifford Bryan Jeremy
- Born: 6 February 1980 (age 46); Piggotts, Saint George, Antigua and Barbuda
- Batting: Right-handed
- Bowling: Right-arm fast-medium

International information
- National side: West Indies
- ODI debut (cap 102): 4 October 2000 v Sri Lanka
- Last ODI: 16 May 2001 v South Africa

Domestic team information
- Years: Team
- 1998–2007: Leeward Islands

Career statistics
Competition	ODIs	FC	LA
Matches	6	55	42
Runs scored	17	446	121
Batting average	8.50	9.29	8.64
100s/50s	0/0	0/1	0/0
Top score	8*	70*	27
Balls bowled	192	9,094	1,831
Wickets	4	177	42
Bowling average	40.75	24.30	31.59
5 wickets in innings	0	10	1
10 wickets in match	0	0	0
Best bowling	2/42	6/33	6/42
Catches/stumpings	0/–	24/–	9/–
- Source: Cricket Archive, 26 October 2010

Kerry Clifford Bryan Jeremy (born 6 February 1980 in Antigua) is a cricketer. He played six One Day Internationals for West Indies from 2000 to 2001.
