= Curtis Jackson (cricketer) =

Bermudian cricketer (born 1967)

Personal information
- Born: 23 March 1967 (age 59); Bermuda

International information
- National side: Bermuda

Domestic team information
- Years: Team
- 2000/01: Bermuda

Career statistics
Competition	First-class	List A
Matches	1	1
Runs scored	0	7
Batting average	0.00	7.00
100s/50s	0/0	0/0
Top score	0	7
Balls bowled	18	–
Wickets	0–	–
Bowling average	–	–
5 wickets in innings	–	–
10 wickets in match	–	–
Best bowling	–	–
Catches/stumpings	1/–	0/–
- Source: CricketArchive, 13 October 2011

Curtis Jackson (born 23 March 1967) is a Bermudian cricketer. To date, he has played one first-class match for Bermuda, against Kenya in the 2005 ICC Intercontinental Cup. He has also played one List A match against Guyana in 2000.
