= Dennis Archer (cricketer) =

Bermudian cricketer (born 1963)

Personal information
- Full name: Dennis R Archer
- Born: 11 March 1963 (age 63); Barbados
- Batting: Right-handed
- Bowling: Right arm medium
- Role: Bowler

Career statistics
Competition	FC	LA	ICC T
Matches	2	12	6
Runs scored	34	120	41
Batting average	11.33	10.90	10.25
100s/50s	0/0	0/0	0/0
Top score	20*	29	18
Balls bowled	234	404	240
Wickets	3	11	8
Bowling average	33.33	26.81	18.50
5 wickets in innings	0	0	0
10 wickets in match	0	0	0
Best bowling	3/30	3/40	3/40
Catches/stumpings	2/–	2/–	2/–
- Source: CricketArchive, 30 September 2008

Dennis Archer (born 11 March 1963) is a Bermudian cricketer. He is a right-handed batsman and a right-arm medium-pace bowler. He made his debut for Bermuda against Trinidad & Tobago on 7 October 1998. He played for them in two ICC Trophies (in 2001 and 2005), and also in their two ICC Intercontinental Cup matches in 2004, which are his only first-class matches to date. His last game was the third place play off of the 2005 ICC Trophy against Canada on 11 July 2005.
