= Sylvester Joseph =

West Indian cricketer

Personal information
- Full name: Sylvester Cleofoster Joseph
- Born: 5 September 1978 (age 48); New Winthorpes, Saint George, Antigua and Barbuda
- Batting: Right-handed
- Bowling: Right-arm off-break

International information
- National side: West Indies
- Test debut (cap 257): 12 August 2004 v England
- Last Test: 25 May 2007 v England
- ODI debut (cap 99): 19 April 2000 v Pakistan
- Last ODI: 7 August 2005 v India

Domestic team information
- Years: Team
- 1996–2014: Leeward Islands

Career statistics
Competition	Test	ODI	FC	LA
Matches	5	13	87	88
Runs scored	147	161	4,517	2,174
Batting average	14.70	16.10	31.58	29.37
100s/50s	0/0	0/1	9/20	2/14
Top score	45	58	211*	100*
Balls bowled	12	–	396	126
Wickets	0	–	4	1
Bowling average	–	–	50.75	117.00
5 wickets in innings	–	–	0	0
10 wickets in match	–	–	0	0
Best bowling	–	–	2/13	1/9
Catches/stumpings	3/–	4/–	83/–	32/–
Medal record
Men's Cricket
Representing West Indies
ICC Champions Trophy
Winner	2004 England
- Source: CricketArchive, 14 June 2010

Sylvester Cleofoster Joseph (born 5 September 1978) is a West Indian cricketer who has played in five Test matches and 13 One Day Internationals from 2000 to 2005. He captained the West Indies in one of those ODI games due to the more experienced players being unavailable courtesy of contract disputes. In West Indian domestic cricket he plays for the Leeward Islands. Joseph was a member of the West Indies team that won the 2004 ICC Champions Trophy.

Against the West Indies B in the Busta Cup of 2001/02, Joseph converted his maiden first class ton for the Leeward Islands into a double century, finishing with 211 not out.

A right-handed middle order batsman, Joseph first joined the national team when they toured Australia in 2000–01. He did not play a Test but did take part in the ODI series, albeit without any success.

In July 2004 he toured England and scored a century against a Sri Lankan A side. He followed it up with 68 in the second innings to put himself in contention for the Tests. After not being selected for the first two Tests he made his debut in the 3rd Test at Old Trafford. He came into the side as a direct replacement for Devon Smith and as a result was asked to open the batting. He made 45 in the first innings and 15 in the second. Opening the batting again in the following Test he failed to impress and had to wait until the tour of Sri Lanka a year later to get a recall.

Joseph is now a regular for West Indies A side and is the current captain of the side. In 2006 he made two centuries for them, both against England A.
