= Naseer Islam =

Cricketer

Personal information
- Born: 23 September 1972 (age 54); Pakistan
- Batting: Right-handed
- Bowling: Right-arm medium-fast

International information
- National side: United States (1997–2007)
- Source: CricketArchive, 11 March 2016

Naseer Islam (born 23 September 1972) is a former international cricketer who represented the American national team between 1997 and 2007. He was born in Pakistan.

A right-arm pace bowler, Islam made his debut for the U.S. national team at the 1997 ICC Trophy in Malaysia, playing in five of his team's seven matches and taking five wickets. His best figures at the tournament were 3/15 from ten overs, taken against Israel. The following year, Islam played in the 1998–99 Red Stripe Bowl – a West Indian domestic competition in which the U.S. had been invited to compete. He took 2/41 against Jamaica, but was wicketless in the other matches (against the Leeward Islands and Barbados). At the 2001 ICC Trophy in Canada, Islam was the leading wicket-taker for the United States, finishing with 17 wickets from his nine matches. Against Canada he took 5/41 from ten overs, while against Ireland he took 4/32 from 9.2 overs. In July 2004, Islam was selected to play in an ICC Intercontinental Cup game against Bermuda, which held first-class status. His final appearance for the U.S. came three years later, in September 2007, on a tour of India.
