= Laurie Williams (cricketer) =

West Indian cricketer (1968–2002)

Personal information
- Full name: Laurie Rohan Williams
- Born: 12 December 1968; Saint Ann, Jamaica
- Died: 8 September 2002 (aged 33); Portmore, Kingston, Jamaica
- Batting: Right-handed
- Bowling: Right-arm medium pace

International information
- National side: West Indies
- ODI debut (cap 77): 30 March 1996 v New Zealand
- Last ODI: 9 February 2001 v Australia

Domestic team information
- Years: Team
- 1989–2002: Jamaica

Career statistics
Competition	ODIs	FC	LA
Matches	15	58	70
Runs scored	124	2,002	667
Batting average	11.27	24.71	14.50
100s/50s	0/0	3/7	0/0
Top score	41	135	44
Balls bowled	659	8,849	3,099
Wickets	18	170	79
Bowling average	30.88	23.17	27.84
5 wickets in innings	0	7	3
10 wickets in match	0	0	0
Best bowling	3/16	6/26	6/19
Catches/stumpings	8/–	34/–	16/–
- Source: Cricket Archive, 25 October 2010

Laurie Rohan Williams (12 December 1968 – 8 September 2002) was a West Indian cricketer. Williams was 33 years old when he died; a car he was driving crashed into an oncoming bus.

Williams made his first-class debut for Jamaica in February 1990 against England, opening the bowling. He bowled medium pacers, concentrating more on seam and swing as opposed to being fast.

Also handy with the bat, Williams made three first-class hundreds including a career-best 135 for Jamaica against the Windward Islands. That innings helped him to become the second-highest runmaker in the 1999–2000 Busta Cup.

Williams played 15 One Day Internationals (ODI) for West Indies, the large bulk of them coming in the 2000–01 Carlton Series in Australia. His best ODI bowling performance was perhaps his three wickets for 16 runs against New Zealand in his just his second match.

At the time of his death Williams had played 58 first-class matches for West Indies A and Jamaica. He scored 2,002 runs at 24.71 and took 170 wickets at 23.17. His best first-class bowling figures were six wickets for 26 runs, made in 1996–97. He died in a car accident in Kingston on 8 September 2002, aged 33.
