= Vibart Wight =

Guyanese cricekter

- Wight in 1930

Personal information
- Full name: Claude Vibart Wight
- Born: 28 July 1902; Georgetown, British Guiana
- Died: 4 October 1969 (aged 67); Georgetown, Guyana
- Batting: Right-handed
- Bowling: Right-arm (unknown style)
- Relatives: Leslie Wight (cousin); Peter Wight (cousin)

International information
- National side: West Indies
- Test debut (cap 15): 11 August 1928 v England
- Last Test: 21 February 1930 v England

Domestic team information
- Years: Team
- 1925–1938: British Guiana

Career statistics
Competition	Tests	First-class
Matches	2	40
Runs scored	67	1,547
Batting average	22.33	30.94
100s/50s	0/0	3/3
Top score	23	130
Balls bowled	30	342
Wickets	0	3
Bowling average	–	69.66
5 wickets in innings	0	0
10 wickets in match	0	0
Best bowling	0/6	1/18
Catches/stumpings	0/–	20/–
- Source: Cricket Archive, 27 October 2010

Claude Vibart Wight (28 July 1902 – 4 October 1969) was a Guyanese cricketer who played two Tests in the 1920s and 1930s.

Wight was born in Georgetown, British Guiana and made his first-class debut in 1925. He was a useful middle-order batsman and an occasional bowler who represented British Guiana against the visiting M.C.C. in February 1926 and a few days later he represented the West Indies, not then a Test playing nation, against the same tourists, scoring 90 in the second match and sharing a seventh-wicket partnership of 173 with Snuffy Browne.

In 1928, despite having no leadership experience, Wight was appointed vice-captain for West Indies’ first Test visit and series against England. It was not a successful tour for Wight, scoring just 343 runs (average 20.17) but he made his Test debut in the third match of the series played at the Oval, scoring 23 and 12 not out. His only other Test was the third match of the return series, played in February 1930 at his hometown of Bourda, British Guiana. Unfortunately, his contribution to a West Indian victory was just 10 and 22.

In all first-class matches, Wight scored 1,547 runs at a respectable average of 30.94 and amassed three scores over 100. These came in January 1928 at Bridgetown, Barbados, for Rest of West Indies v. a 'British Born' team when he scored 119 not out, in September 1934 at Bourda for British Guiana v. Barbados when he scored 130 and 76, and in October 1937 again at Bourda for British Guiana against Trinidad when he hit his own wicket with his score at 127. His death in Kingston, Georgetown, Guyana, in 1969 went unrecorded in Wisden at the time.

Wight's nephew Leslie Wight also played Test cricket for the West Indies, while eight other relatives played first-class or important matches.
