= Charlie Marshall (cricketer) =

Bermudian cricketer (born 1961)

Personal information
- Full name: Charles Macdonald Marshall
- Born: 10 May 1961 (age 65); Bailey's Bay, Hamilton Parish, Bermuda
- Batting: Left-handed
- Bowling: Left-arm medium

International information
- National side: Bermuda

Domestic team information
- Years: Team
- 1996/97–2000/01: Bermuda

Career statistics
Competition	List A
Matches	16
Runs scored	439
Batting average	27.43
100s/50s	–/2
Top score	86
Balls bowled	320
Wickets	11
Bowling average	23.63
5 wickets in innings	–
10 wickets in match	–
Best bowling	3/46
Catches/stumpings	3/–
- Source: CricketArchive, 13 October 2011

Charles Macdonald Marshall (born 10 May 1961 in Bermuda) is a Bermudian cricketer. He is a left-handed batsman and a left-arm medium pace bowler. He has played 16 List A matches in the Red Stripe Bowl for Bermuda, and also represented Bermuda in four ICC Trophy tournaments and the 2004 ICC Americas Championship. He was set to play in a fifth ICC Trophy in 2005, but was axed from the squad due to disciplinary issues.
