= 2001 ICC Trophy squads =

Twenty-two teams participated in the 2001 ICC Trophy, the seventh edition of the tournament. Four teams – France, Germany, Nepal, and Uganda – were making their tournament debuts. Four teams also did not return from the previous edition of the tournament in 1997 – Bangladesh and Kenya had been granted automatic qualification for the 2003 World Cup, West Africa were refused entry to Canada, and Italy unexpectedly withdrew due to a dispute over the eligibility of their players.

== Argentina ==
Only players who appeared in at least one match at the tournament are listed. The leading run-scorer is marked with a dagger (†) and the leading wicket-taker with a double dagger (‡).

Coach: (South Africa) Grant Dugmore

- Gastón Arizaga
- Martin Cortabarria
- Alejandro Ferguson
- Pablo Ferguson †
- Donald Forrester
- Tomas Francis
- Guillermo Kirschbaum

- Diego Lord
- Lucas Paterlini
- Matias Paterlini
- Hernan Pereyra ‡
- Andres Perez Rivero
- Christian Tuñon
- Malcolm van Steeden

Source: ESPNcricinfo

== Bermuda ==
Only players who appeared in at least one match at the tournament are listed. The leading run-scorer is marked with a dagger (†) and the leading wicket-taker with a double dagger (‡).

Coach: (Guyana) Mark Harper

- Dennis Archer
- Herbert Bascombe ‡
- Richard Basden
- Hasan Durham
- Dale Fox
- Ricky Hill
- Dwayne Leverock ‡
- Charlie Marshall

- Dennis Pilgrim
- Oliver Pitcher
- Clay Smith †
- Dexter Smith
- Albert Steede
- Janeiro Tucker
- Kwame Tucker

Source: ESPNcricinfo

== Canada ==
Only players who appeared in at least one match at the tournament are listed. The leading run-scorer is marked with a dagger (†) and the leading wicket-taker with a double dagger (‡).

Coach: (Australia) Jeff Thomas

- Ashish Bagai
- Ian Billcliff
- Desmond Chumney
- Austin Codrington
- Melvin Croning
- John Davison
- Nicholas de Groot

- Muneeb Diwan
- Joseph Harris †
- Nicholas Ifill
- Davis Joseph
- Ishwar Maraj
- Barry Seebaran
- Sanjayan Thuraisingam ‡

Source: ESPNcricinfo

== Denmark ==
Only players who appeared in at least one match at the tournament are listed. The leading run-scorer is marked with a dagger (†) and the leading wicket-taker with a double dagger (‡).

Coach: (Denmark) Ole Mortensen

- Aftab Ahmed †
- Bobby Chawla
- Saad Hafeez
- Thomas Hansen
- Lars Hedegaard
- Morten Hedegaard
- Martin Jensen

- Amjad Khan
- Søren Kirk
- Frederik Klokker
- Mickey Lund
- Carsten Pedersen
- Lejf Slebsager
- Søren Vestergaard ‡

Source: ESPNcricinfo

== East and Central Africa ==
Only players who appeared in at least one match at the tournament are listed. The leading run-scorer is marked with a dagger (†) and the leading wicket-taker with a double dagger (‡).

Coach: Ismail Hassan

- Kevin Cumings
- Arshad Dudhia
- Arif Ebrahim
- Chad Gomm
- Galoli Jetha
- Viru Kamania †

- Shamsher Madhani
- Raymond Msiagi
- Feroz Munshi
- Arif Pali ‡
- Yekesh Patel
- Mohamed Yusufali

Source: ESPNcricinfo

== Fiji ==
Only players who appeared in at least one match at the tournament are listed. The leading run-scorer is marked with a dagger (†) and the leading wicket-taker with a double dagger (‡).

Player-coach: (Fiji) Neil Maxwell

- Taione Batina
- Joji Bulabalavu
- Iniasi Cakacaka
- Johnny Hussain
- Maika Kamikamica
- Neil Maxwell †‡
- Iliesa Navatu

- Colin Rika
- Jone Seuvou
- Jone Sorovakatini
- Tavo Sorovakatini
- Atunaisi Tawatatau
- Seci Tuiwai
- Waisake Tukana

Source: ESPNcricinfo

== France ==
Only players who appeared in at least one match at the tournament are listed. The leading run-scorer is marked with a dagger (†) and the leading wicket-taker with a double dagger (‡).

- Arun Ayyavooraju
- David Bordes
- Guy Brumant ‡
- Val Brumant
- Gareth Edwards
- Sulanga Hewawalandanage
- Simon Hewitt

- Shabbir Hussain †
- George James
- Peter Linton
- Philip Martin
- Ayeppin Rattiname
- Paul Wakefield

Source: ESPNcricinfo

== Germany ==
Only players who appeared in at least one match at the tournament are listed. The leading run-scorer is marked with a dagger (†) and the leading wicket-taker with a double dagger (‡).

Coach: (England) Harold Rhodes

- Zaheer Ahmed
- Bruce Auchinleck
- Abdul Hamid Bhatti ‡
- Abdul Salam Bhatti
- Mark Brodersen
- Jakob Bumke
- Renald Buss

- Gerrit Müller †
- Shamas-ud-Din Khan
- Younis Khan
- Badar Munir
- Ayub Pasha
- Hans Petersen
- Tayyab Rathore

Source: ESPNcricinfo

== Gibraltar ==
Only players who appeared in at least one match at the tournament are listed. The leading run-scorer is marked with a dagger (†) and the leading wicket-taker with a double dagger (‡).

Coach: (England) Richard Cox

- Gareth Balban
- Richard Buzaglo
- Tim Buzaglo
- Steve Cary
- Clive Clinton
- Gary De'Ath
- Ian Farrell

- Steven Gonzalez
- Paul Howard
- Daniel Johnson ‡
- Dave Robeson
- Christian Rocca †
- Stephen Shephard
- Chris Watkins

Source: ESPNcricinfo

== Hong Kong ==
Only players who appeared in at least one match at the tournament are listed. The leading run-scorer is marked with a dagger (†) and the leading wicket-taker with a double dagger (‡).

Coach: (England) Andy Moles

- Stewart Brew
- Dyutish Chaudhuri
- Tabarak Dar ‡
- Mark Davies
- Mark Eames
- Alexander French
- Munir Hussain

- Jawaid Iqbal
- Mohammad Jamshaid
- Sher Lama
- Roy Lamsam
- Saleem Malik
- Rahul Sharma †
- Mohammad Zubair

Source: ESPNcricinfo

== Ireland ==
Only players who appeared in at least one match at the tournament are listed. The leading run-scorer is marked with a dagger (†) and the leading wicket-taker with a double dagger (‡).

Coach: (New Zealand) Ken Rutherford

- Dekker Curry
- Peter Davy
- Matthew Dwyer
- Ryan Eagleson
- Derek Heasley
- Dom Joyce
- Ed Joyce †

- Kyle McCallan
- Adrian McCoubrey ‡
- Jason Molins
- Paul Mooney
- Andrew Patterson
- Mark Patterson
- Andrew White

Source: ESPNcricinfo

== Israel ==
Only players who appeared in at least one match at the tournament are listed. The leading run-scorer is marked with a dagger (†) and the leading wicket-taker with a double dagger (‡).

Coach: (Israel) Herschel Gutman

- Raymond Aston
- Hillel Awasker
- Jacky Divekar
- Mahendra Jaiswar
- Benzie Kehimkar
- Gershon Massil
- Isaac Massil ‡

- Yefeth Nagavkar †
- Shalom Rubin
- Steven Shein
- David Silver
- Avi Talkar
- Adrian Vard
- Menashe Wadavkar

Source: ESPNcricinfo

== Malaysia ==
Only players who appeared in at least one match at the tournament are listed. The leading run-scorer is marked with a dagger (†) and the leading wicket-taker with a double dagger (‡).

Coach: (Australia) Lyndsay Walker

- Sharani Ahmed
- Chew Pok Cheong
- Yazid Imran
- Rakesh Madhavan †
- Krishnamurthi Muniandy
- Marimuthu Muniandy
- Suresh Navaratnam

- Shankar Retinam
- Rohan Selvaratnam
- Suresh Singh
- Rohan Suppiah ‡
- Satgunasingam Vickneswaran ‡
- Matthew William

Source: ESPNcricinfo

== Namibia ==
Only players who appeared in at least one match at the tournament are listed. The leading run-scorer is marked with a dagger (†) and the leading wicket-taker with a double dagger (‡).

Player-coach: (Namibia) Lennie Louw

- Jan-Berrie Burger
- Louis Burger
- Morne Karg
- Danie Keulder †
- Bjorn Kotze
- Deon Kotze
- Lennie Louw

- Gavin Murgatroyd
- Rudi Scholtz
- Stephan Swanepoel
- Burton van Rooi ‡
- Melt van Schoor
- Rudi van Vuuren
- Riaan Walters

Source: ESPNcricinfo

== Nepal ==
Only players who appeared in at least one match at the tournament are listed. The leading run-scorer is marked with a dagger (†) and the leading wicket-taker with a double dagger (‡).

Coach: (Pakistan) Aftab Baloch

- Pawan Agrawal
- Mahaboob Alam
- Dipendra Chaudhary
- Binod Das
- Navin Ghimire
- Paresh Lohani
- Parash Luniya ‡

- Sanjam Regmi
- Jay Sarraf †
- Durgaraj Sen
- Monick Shrestha
- Sandip Shrestha
- Ganesh Thakuri

Source: ESPNcricinfo

== Netherlands ==
Only players who appeared in at least one match at the tournament are listed. The leading run-scorer is marked with a dagger (†) and the leading wicket-taker with a double dagger (‡).

Coach: (Barbados) Emmerson Trotman

- Zulfiqar Ahmed
- Roger Bradley
- Tim de Leede
- Jacob-Jan Esmeijer
- Sebastiaan Gokke
- Asim Khan
- Feiko Kloppenburg

- Roland Lefebvre ‡
- Hendrik-Jan Mol
- Adeel Raja
- Reinout Scholte
- Klaas-Jan van Noortwijk †
- Robert van Oosterom
- Luuk van Troost

Source: ESPNcricinfo

== Papua New Guinea ==
Only players who appeared in at least one match at the tournament are listed. The leading run-scorer is marked with a dagger (†) and the leading wicket-taker with a double dagger (‡).

Coach: (Papua New Guinea) William Maha

- Jamie Brazier
- Rarva Dikana
- Toka Gaudi
- Jamie Iga
- Gima Keimelo
- Kopi Kopi
- Arua Loa

- Navu Maha
- Aukuma Noka
- John Ovia
- Tuku Raka ‡
- Arua Uda †
- Ross Vagi
- Keimelo Vuivagi

Source: ESPNcricinfo

== Scotland ==
Only players who appeared in at least one match at the tournament are listed. The leading run-scorer is marked with a dagger (†) and the leading wicket-taker with a double dagger (‡).

Coach: (England) Jim Love and (England) Mike Hendrick

- Darryl Anderson
- John Blain ‡
- James Brinkley
- Asim Butt
- David Cox
- Dougie Lockhart
- Gregor Maiden
- Drew Parsons

- Bruce Patterson
- George Salmond
- Keith Sheridan ‡
- Colin Smith †
- Fraser Watts
- Greig Williamson
- Craig Wright

Source: ESPNcricinfo

== Singapore ==
Only players who appeared in at least one match at the tournament are listed. The leading run-scorer is marked with a dagger (†) and the leading wicket-taker with a double dagger (‡).

Coach: (Australia) Bruce Yardley

- Narayanan Balasubramaniam
- Joshua Dearing †‡
- Kiran Deshpande
- Shehzad Haque
- Rishi Kaul
- Sunder Mani
- Peter Muruthi

- Johann Pieris
- Zeng Renchun
- Andrew Scott
- Sandeep Seth
- Mohamed Shoib
- Zubin Shroff
- Ravi Thambinayagam

Source: ESPNcricinfo

== Uganda ==
Only players who appeared in at least one match at the tournament are listed. The leading run-scorer is marked with a dagger (†) and the leading wicket-taker with a double dagger (‡).

Coach: (Uganda) Andrew Meya

- Kenneth Kamyuka
- Junior Kwebiha ‡
- Keith Legesi
- John Lubia
- Charles Lwanga †
- Tendo Mbazzi
- Benjamin Musoke

- Richard Mwami
- Frank Nsubuga
- Simon Nsubuga
- Henry Oketcho
- Richard Okia
- Joel Olwenyi
- Lawrence Sematimba

Source: ESPNcricinfo

== United Arab Emirates ==
Only players who appeared in at least one match at the tournament are listed. The leading run-scorer is marked with a dagger (†) and the leading wicket-taker with a double dagger (‡).

Coach: (Pakistan) Naved Anjum

- Ahmed Nadeem †
- Arshad Ali
- Asim Saeed
- Ausaf Ali
- Babar Malik
- Danish Jabbar
- Khurram Khan ‡

- Leon Carlo
- Mahmood Pir Baksh
- Mohammad Atif
- Mohammad Nadeem
- Mohammad Tauqir
- Nasir Siddiqi
- Saeed-al-Saffar

Source: ESPNcricinfo

== United States ==
Only players who appeared in at least one match at the tournament are listed. The leading run-scorer is marked with a dagger (†) and the leading wicket-taker with a double dagger (‡).

Coach: (India) Syed Abid Ali

- Rohan Alexander †
- Aijaz Ali
- Faoud Bacchus
- Donovan Blake
- David Hoilett
- Naseer Islam ‡
- Nasir Javed

- Mark Johnson
- Michael Springer
- Richard Staple
- Dave Wallace
- Rashid Zia
- Joy Zinto

Source: ESPNcricinfo

== Withdrawn teams ==
=== Italy ===
Italy named a fourteen-man squad for the tournament in April 2001. However, following an ICC meeting in June, the player qualification rules for the tournament were altered, which had the effect of making four Italian squad members ineligible. The Italian team withdrew in protest.

Coach: (England) Doug Ferguson

- Kamal Karyiyawasam (c)
- Alessandro Bonora
- Andrea Corbellari
- Samantha de Mel
- Peter Di Venuto
- Benito Giordano
- Hemantha Jayasena

- Riccardo Maggio
- Warren Mazzoncini
- Andrea Parisi
- Akhlaq Qureshi
- Joe Scuderi
- Aamir Shah
- Valerio Zuppirioli

=== West Africa ===
All seventeen members of the West African team's touring party (14 players and three officials) were refused visas to Canada, forcing the team to withdraw from the tournament only a few days before its start.

Coach: (Sierra Leone) Cyril Panda

- Adedapo Adegoyke
- Wale Adeoye
- Kofi Anaefi
- Henry Anthony
- Muhammad Kamara
- Alex Kanyako
- Sao Kanyako

- Albert Kpundeh
- Sahr Kpundeh
- Charles Okodua
- Oladotun Olatunji
- Olubunmi Olufawo
- Joseph Talleh
- Okun Ukpong
