= 2005 ICC Trophy =

International cricket tournament

- Logo of the 2005 ICC Trophy
- Dates: 1 – 13 July 2005
- Administrator: International Cricket Council
- Cricket format: List A cricket
- Tournament format(s): Round-robin and Knockout
- Host: Ireland
- Champions: Scotland (1st title)
- Runners-up: Ireland
- Participants: 12
- Matches: 42
- Most runs: (Netherlands) Bas Zuiderent (474)
- Most wickets: (Scotland) Paul Hoffmann (17)

The 2005 ICC Trophy was a cricket tournament held in Ireland between 1 July and 13 July 2005. It was an international one-day tournament played over 50 overs per side between 12 Associate Members of the International Cricket Council. It served as the final part of the Cricket World Cup qualification process, coming with the prize of a place in the 2007 Cricket World Cup (and together with it a share of US$2.5 million for future development) for the five top-ranked teams, and with the prize of official One-Day International status from 1 January 2006 (until the 2009 ICC Trophy) for the five top-ranked teams along with Kenya (who had already been given official one-day status until the 2009 ICC Trophy and a spot in the 2007 World Cup).

For the first time, five spots were on offer for the World Cup, compared to three previously. On 7 July, the top 4 teams Scotland, Canada and for the first time Ireland and Bermuda qualified for the 2007 Cricket World Cup and, from 1 January 2006, gained official One-Day International status. On 11 July the Netherlands also achieved this by beating the United Arab Emirates to finish fifth. Scotland won the tournament, beating Ireland by 47 runs in the final.

Dutch batsman Bas Zuiderent was named the Player of the Tournament.

It was the final edition of this competition titled 'ICC Trophy' before it was renamed to the 'Cricket World Cup Qualifier' for 2009.

== Firsts ==
- The 2005 ICC Trophy featured coloured player clothing, white cricket balls and black sight screens instead of the traditional white clothing, red ball and white sight screens which had been used in the previous editions.
- All matches were accorded List A status unlike the previous editions which were classified as minor matches.

== Competition format ==
The 12 teams were divided into two groups of six teams. Each team played with each other in its group once. Five matches per team were played between 1 July and 7 July. The resulting group tables were then each divided into three bands of two teams each.

Combining the two groups, the four teams in each band then played a mini knock-out tournament consisting of two semi-finals, a championship, and a consolation match, so that the first- and second-ranked teams from each of the original groups were playing for first through fourth place in the tournament overall; the third- and fourth-ranked teams for fifth through eighth; and the fifth- and sixth-ranked teams for ninth through twelfth. Thus at the end of the tournament all teams are given a definitive rank between 1 and 12. The final play-offs were played on 11 July with the final on 13 July.

Apart from the academic interest in this final classification, one match in particular had great significance: the winner of the second band's mini tournament would, by taking fifth place overall, become the fifth and final team to win temporary ODI status and an invitation to the 2007 Cricket World Cup.

== Teams ==
Means of qualification	No. of teams	Teams
—	4	Denmark; Ireland; Netherlands; Scotland
Pre-qualifying competition	8	Bermuda; Canada; Namibia; Oman; Papua New Guinea; Uganda; United Arab Emirates; United States
Total	12	

== Squads ==
Bermuda	Canada	Denmark	Ireland
Dennis Archer; Delyone Borden; Lionel Cann; Chris Foggo; Dwayne Leverock; Dean Minors; Saleem Mukuddem; Oliver Pitcher; Irving Romaine; Clay Smith; Albert Steede; Ryan Steede; Janeiro Tucker; Wendell White	Ian Billcliff; Desmond Chumney; Pubudu Dassanayake; John Davison; Sunil Dhaniram; Haninder Dhillon; Iain Dixon; Don Maxwell; Henry Osinde; Ashish Patel; Kevin Sandher; Zubin Surkari; Sanjayan Thuraisingam; Umar Bhatti	Aftab Ahmed; Rashid Ali; David Borchersen; Bobby Chawla; Henrik Hansen; Jesper Hansen; Thomas Hansen; Frederik Klokker; Niels Kopperholdt; Mickey Lund; Johan Malcolm; Carsten Pedersen; Michael Pedersen; Zishan Shah; Baljit Singh	Andre Botha; Jeremy Bray; Gordon Cooke; Peter Gillespie; Trent Johnston; Dominick Joyce; Ed Joyce; Kyle McCallan; Adrian McCoubrey; Jason Molins; Paul Mooney; Eoin Morgan; Naseer Shaukat; Andrew White
Namibia	Netherlands	Oman	Papua New Guinea
Jan-Berrie Burger; Kola Burger; Louis Burger; Sarel Burger; Morne Karg; Daniel Keulder; Bjorn Kotze; Deon Kotze; Hugo Ludik; Nicholaas Scholtz; Gerrie Snyman; Stephan Swanepoel; Ian van Zyl; Riaan Walters	Tom de Grooth; Tim de Leede; Jacob-Jan Esmeijer; Sebastiaan Gokke; Feiko Kloppenburg; Adeel Raja; Darron Reekers; Edgar Schiferli; Jeroen Smits; Billy Stelling; Ryan ten Doeschate; Daan van Bunge; Luuk van Troost; Bas Zuiderent	Adnan Ilyas; Ameet Sampat; Awal Khan; Azhar Ali; Farhan Khan; Hemal Mehta; Hemin Desai; Jitendra Redkar; Mazhar Khan; Mohammad Asif; Mohammad Aslam; Rakesh Sharma; Sultan Ahmed; Tariq Hussain	Chris Amini; Hitolo Areni; Inoa Baeau; Jamie Brazier; Mahuru Dai; Rarva Dikana; Toka Gaudi; Gima Keimelo; Peter Moide; Ipi Morea; John Ovia; Arua Uda; Kauna Vagi; Asad Vala
Scotland	Uganda	United Arab Emirates	United States
John Blain; Dougie Brown; Kyle Coetzer; Cedric English; Gavin Hamilton; Paul Hoffmann; Dougie Lockhart; Gregor Maiden; Dewald Nel; Colin Smith; Ryan Watson; Fraser Watts; Greig Williamson; Craig Wright	Hamza Almuzahim; Nehal Bibodi; Emmanuel Isaneez; Kenneth Kamyuka; Junior Kwebiha; Keith Legesi; Benjamin Musoke; Frank Nsubuga; Patrick Ochan; Joel Olwenyi; Raymond Otim; Nandikishore Patel; Laurence Sematimba; Charles Waiswa	Ahmed Nadeem; Ali Asad; Arshad Ali; Asghar Ali; Asim Saeed; Fahad Usman; Javed Ismail; Khurram Khan; Mohammad Nadeem; Mohammad Tauqir; Naeemuddin Aslam; Rizwan Latif; Sameer Zia; Syed Maqsood	Aijaz Ali; Rohan Alexander; Hamish Anthony; Imran Awan; Barrington Bartley; Nasir Javed; Howard Johnson; Mark Johnson; Clayton Lambert; Steve Massiah; Tony Reid; Leon Romero; Gowkaran Roopnarine; Richard Staple

== Group matches ==
=== Group A ===
Points table
Pos	Team	Pld	W	L	T	NR	Pts	NRR	Qualification
1	Ireland (H)	5	4	0	0	1	9	1.494	Advanced to the semi-finals
2	Bermuda	5	3	1	0	1	7	0.695	Advanced to the semi-finals
3	United Arab Emirates	5	2	2	0	1	5	0.432	Advanced to the 5th - 9th Knockouts
4	Denmark	5	2	2	0	1	5	−0.210	Advanced to the 5th - 9th Knockouts
5	Uganda	5	1	3	0	1	3	−1.047	Advanced to the 9th - 12th Knockouts
6	United States	5	0	4	0	1	1	−1.385	Advanced to the 9th - 12th Knockouts

Source: ESPNcricinfo
(H) Host

1 July 2005
Scorecard

Ireland; 315/8 (50 overs)	v	Bermuda; 218/6 (50 overs)
Ed Joyce 103 (92); Delyone Borden 2/34 (10 overs)		Janeiro Tucker 53 (53); Andrew White 2/44 (10 overs)

Ireland won by 97 runs
Civil Service Cricket Club, Stormont
Umpires: Asoka de Silva (SL) and Subhash Modi (Ken)
Player of the match: Ed Joyce (Ire)

- Ireland won the toss and elected to bat.

Ireland (315 for 8) beat Bermuda (218 for 6) easily as Ed Joyce made 103 for the hosts in Stormont.

1 July 2005
Scorecard

Denmark; 196/8 (50 overs)	v	Uganda; 168 (48.5 overs)
Johan Malcolm 71 (147); Kenneth Kamyuka 4/39 (10 overs)		Kenneth Kamyuka 59 (71); Thomas Hansen 6/30 (9.5 overs)

Denmark won by 28 runs
Muckamore Cricket Club, Muckamore
Umpires: KC Barbour (Zim) and S Hameed (Idn)
Player of the match: Thomas Hansen (Den)

- Denmark won the toss and elected to bat.

Denmark beat Uganda by 28 runs as Thomas Munkholt Hansen took 6 for 30 to carry Denmark to a 28-run win over Uganda in Muckamore. Denmark made 196 with Johan Malcolm making 71. Despite 59 from Kenneth Kamyuka, the Africans could only manage 168 in reply.

1 July 2005
Scorecard

United Arab Emirates; 200 (39.5 overs)	v	United States; 145 (40.5 overs)
Khurram Khan 79 (80); Hamish Anthony 5/46 (10 overs)		Imran Awan 30 (35); Ahmed Nadeem 5/32 (9 overs)

United Arab Emirates won by 55 runs
Strangford Road, Downpatrick
Umpires: Asad Rauf (Pak) and SS Prasad (Sin)
Player of the match: Khurram Khan (UAE)

- United States won the toss and elected to field.

The United Arab Emirates (200) beat the United States (145).

2 July 2005
Scorecard

Bermuda; 217/9 (50 overs)	v	United Arab Emirates; 187 (46 overs)
Lionel Cann 45 (17); Javed Ismail 3/29 (10 overs); Mohammad Tauqir 3/29 (9 overs)		Fahad Usman 64 (57); Janeiro Tucker 3/30 (9 overs)

Bermuda won by 30 runs
Lisburn Cricket Club, Wallace Park, Lisburn
Umpires: Krishna Hariharan (IND) & Trevor Henry (IRE)
Player of the match: Dwayne Leverock

- United Arab Emirates won the toss and elected to field.

The upset of the day was a 30 run win by Bermuda (217) over the United Arab Emirates (187).

2 July 2005
Scorecard

Denmark; 273/7 (50 overs)	v	United States; 177 (36.4 overs)
Frederik Klokker 138* (149); Hamish Anthony 3/60 (10 overs)		Tony Reid 54 (42); David Borchersen 3/29 (7 overs)

Denmark won by 96 runs
The Mall, Armagh
Umpires: Roger Dill (BER) & Billy Doctrove (WIN)
Player of the match: Frederik Klokker

- Denmark won the toss and elected to bat.

The United States went down to a heavy 96 run defeat by Denmark, for whom wicket-keeper Frederik Klokker starred with 138 not out and a smart stumping.

2 July 2005
Scorecard

Ireland; 231/8 (50 overs)	v	Uganda; 104 (32 overs)
Andrew White 45 (47); Kenneth Kamyuka 4/42 (9 overs)		Frank Nsubuga 59 (58); Paul Mooney 3/10 (10 overs)

Ireland won by 127 runs
North Down Cricket Club, Comber
Umpires: Tony Hill (NZ) & Buddhi Pradhan (NEP)
Player of the match: Paul Mooney

- Uganda won the toss and elected to field.

An all-round performance by the Irish batsmen saw them through to 231 for 8 against Uganda. In reply, however, only Frank Nsubuga, with 59, put up any resistance as the hosts ended up winners by 127 runs.

4 July 2005
Scorecard

Bermuda; 249/8 (50 overs)	v	Denmark; 156 (41 overs)
Irving Romaine 53 (55); Johan Malcolm 3/38 (10 overs)		Thomas Hansen 51 (69); Ryan Steede 3/40 (8 overs)

Bermuda won by 93 runs
Cliftonville Cricket Club, Greenisland
Umpires: Krishna Hariharan (IND) & Sarika Prasad (SIN)
Player of the match: Ryan Steede

- Bermuda won the toss and elected to bat.

Bermuda (249) steered towards the second spot in the group and the World Cup with a thumping 93-run win over Denmark, who lacked application in their batting as they were all out for 156.

4 July 2005
Scorecard

United Arab Emirates; 230 (48.3 overs)	v	Ireland; 231/8 (49.5 overs)
Javed Ismail 56 (37); Trent Johnston 3/45 (9.3 overs)		Ed Joyce 115* (134); Ali Asad 3/38 (8.5 overs)

Ireland won by 2 wickets
Civil Service Cricket Club, Stormont
Umpires: Tony Hill (NZ) & Shahul Hameed (Indonesia)
Player of the match: Ed Joyce

- Ireland won the toss and elected to field.

Ireland were troubled by the United Arab Emirates in a match that could decide Ireland's qualification for the Cricket World Cup. The UAE batted first, making 230 in 48.3 overs before being bowled out, and a fiery opening spell from Ali Asad then reduced the Irish to 23 for 4. Ed Joyce and Trent Johnston rebuilt with a partnership of 122, and Joyce batted well with the tail to make 115 not out in Ireland's 231 for 8.

4 July 2005
Scorecard

United States; 236/7 (50 overs)	v	Uganda; 237/4 (47.4 overs)
Steve Massiah 108* (118); Frank Nsubuga 3/33 (10 overs)		Joel Olwenyi 76 (96); Steve Massiah 2/42 (7 overs)

Uganda won by 6 wickets
Pollock Park, Lurgan
Umpires: Billy Doctrove (WIN) & Subhash Modi (KEN)
Player of the match: Joel Olwenyi

- Uganda won the toss and elected to field.

Uganda (237 for 4) recorded their first win, beating the USA by six wickets (236), Joel Olwenyi top-scoring with 76 after all-rounder Frank Nsubuga had taken 3 for 33

5 July 2005
Scorecard

Uganda; 12/0 (3 overs)	v	Bermuda
Nehal Bibodi 8* (11); Saleem Mukuddem 0/4 (1 overs)

No result
North Down Cricket Club, Comber
Umpires: Kevan Barbour (ZIM) & Subhash Modi (KEN)

- Bermuda won the toss and elected to field.
- Match abandoned due to rain.

5 July 2005
Scorecard

United Arab Emirates; 57/3 (15.2 overs)	v	Denmark
Arshad Ali 25 (41); Henrik Hansen 2/29 (7 overs)

No result
Upritchard Park, Bangor
Umpires: Billy Doctrove (WIN) & Buddhi Pradhan (NEP)

- United Arab Emirates won the toss and elected to bat.
- Match abandoned due to rain.

5 July 2005
Scorecard

Ireland	v	United States

Match abandoned without a ball bowled.
The Lawn, Waringstown
Umpires: Asad Rauf (PAK) & Shahul Hameed (Indonesia)

- No toss
- Match abandoned due to rain.

All of the Group A games were washed out or abandoned because of weather conditions. Under the playing conditions, the rest day was only to be used as a reserve day if all matches in both groups were washed out. Therefore, the games between Ireland and the United States, Denmark and the United Arab Emirates (after the UAE had reached 57 for 3 after 15 overs), and Uganda and Bermuda were all "no results". The wash-out eliminates the United States from World Cup and ODI status contention.

7 July 2005
Scorecard

Bermuda; 311/8 (50 overs)	v	United States; 198 (36.2 overs)
Janeiro Tucker 132 (88); Steve Massiah 2/20 (2 overs)		Barrington Bartley 52 (35); Dwayne Leverock 4/39 (10 overs)

Bermuda won by 113 runs
The Lawn, Waringstown
Umpires: Billy Doctrove (WIN) & Subhash Modi (KEN)
Player of the match: Janeiro Tucker

- United States won the toss and elected to field.

Bermuda, who were ranked as the third-best team from the Americas coming into the tournament easily overcame the United States. 132 from only 88 balls from JJ Tucker and 52 extras saw the Bermudians through to 311 for 8. The Americans started by keeping up with the run rate, but wickets fell and they finished all out for 198.

7 July 2005
Scorecard

Ireland; 222 (49.4 overs)	v	Denmark; 149 (39.3 overs)
Ed Joyce 60 (69); David Borchersen 3/42 (8.4 overs); Bobby Chawla 3/42 (9 overs)		Baljit Singh 58 (112); Andrew White 3/17 (5.3 overs)

Ireland won by 73 runs
Upritchard Park, Bangor
Umpires: Asoka de Silva (SRI) & Buddhi Pradhan (NEP)
Player of the match: Dom Joyce

- Ireland won the toss and elected to bat.

Ireland (222 all out) beat Denmark (149 all out) to take the remaining automatic qualifying spot for the World Cup and ODI status.

7 July 2005
Scorecard

United Arab Emirates; 201 (50 overs)	v	Uganda; 138 (46.3 overs)
Naeemuddin Aslam 76 (106); Joel Olwenyi 4/37 (10 overs)		Keith Legesi 39 (26); Mohammad Tauqir 3/19 (10 overs)

United Arab Emirates won by 63 runs
Pollock Park, Lurgan
Umpires: Asad Rauf (PAK) & Trevor Henry (IRE)
Player of the match: Naeemuddin Aslam

- Uganda won the toss and elected to field.

The UAE (201 all out) secured a 63 run victory over Uganda (138 all out) to make sure they would be in the 5th place semi-final along with the Danes.

=== Group B ===
Points Table
Pos	Team	Pld	W	L	T	NR	Pts	NRR	Qualification
1	Scotland	5	5	0	0	0	10	2.065	Advanced to the semi-finals
2	Canada	5	4	1	0	0	8	0.789	Advanced to the semi-finals
3	Netherlands	5	3	2	0	0	6	1.451	Advanced to the 5th - 9th Knockouts
4	Namibia	5	2	3	0	0	4	0.418	Advanced to the 5th - 9th Knockouts
5	Papua New Guinea	5	1	4	0	0	2	−2.201	Advanced to the 9th - 12th Knockouts
6	Oman	5	0	5	0	0	0	−2.727	Advanced to the 9th - 12th Knockouts

Source: ESPNcricinfo

1 July 2005
Scorecard

Canada; 284 (48.1 overs)	v	Namibia; 282 (49 overs)
John Davison 125 (93); Sarel Burger 3/58 (10 overs)		Danie Keulder 83 (106); Kevin Sandher 5/56 (8 overs)

Canada won by 2 runs
Woodvale Cricket Club Ground, Belfast
Umpires: Billy Doctrove (WIN) & Troy Henry (IRE)
Player of the match: John Davison

- Namibia won the toss and elected to field.

The closest game of the first round was between Canada and Namibia. John Davison, who at the time held the record for the fastest century in the Cricket World Cup made 125, supported by Ian Billcliff's 90 as the North Americans put on 284. In reply, Namibia came close, making 282 to lose by 2 runs in Group B's first heavyweight clash, thanks to Canada's captain, Kevin Sandher's five wickets. Namibia put in a protest, however, claiming that the scoring in the 45th over was wrong. The technical committee turned down Namibia's protest, which prompted Namibia to put in an appeal. Namibia's appeal against the technical committee's ruling was turned down, meaning that Canada retain the 2 points they won on 1 July.

1 July 2005
Scorecard

Papua New Guinea; 69 (25.1 overs)	v	Netherlands; 71/1 (14.4 overs)
Extras (lb 6, w 10, nb 2) 18; Jamie Brazier 16 (27); Edgar Schiferli 5/20 (10 overs)		Daan van Bunge 36* (38); Rarva Dikana 0/6 (2 overs)

Netherlands won by 9 wickets
Osborne Park, Belfast
Umpires: Krishna Hariharan (IND) & Buddhi Pradhan (NEP)
Player of the match: Edgar Schiferli

- Netherlands won the toss and elected to field.

The Netherlands (71 for 1) were easy winners over Papua New Guinea (69 all out) by 9 wickets.

1 July 2005
Scorecard

Oman; 83 (28.2 overs)	v	Scotland; 84/4 (18.3 overs)
Azhar Ali 32 (45); Paul Hoffmann 6/12 (8 overs)		Paul Hoffmann 39 (31); Hemal Mehta 3/17 (7 overs)

Scotland won by 6 wickets
Instonians Cricket Club, Shaw's Bridge Lower Ground, Belfast
Umpires: Roger Dill (BER) & Tony Hill (NZ)
Player of the match: Paul Hoffmann

- Scotland won the toss and elected to field.

Oman (83) were easily beaten by Scotland (84 for 4) by 6 wickets with 31 overs to spare.

2 July 2005
Scorecard

Canada; 189/8 (50 overs)	v	Scotland; 190/3 (42.4 overs)
Sunil Dhaniram 37 (58); Paul Hoffmann 2/19 (10 overs)		Colin Smith 86* (84); Don Maxwell 2/29 (6 overs)

Scotland won by 7 wickets
Upritchard Park, Bangor
Umpires: Asad Rauf (PAK) & Subhash Modi (KEN)
Player of the match: Fraser Watts

- Scotland won the toss and elected to field.

The biggest game of the round saw Scotland (190 for 3), courtesy of Fraser Watts (81*) and Gavin Hamilton (86*) end up winners by 7 wickets over Canada (189).

2 July 2005
Scorecard

Namibia; 252 (49.4 overs)	v	Papua New Guinea; 156 (44.3 overs)
Kola Burger 58 (?); Rarva Dikana 3/31 (9.4 overs)		Ipi Morea 41 (42); Sarel Burger 3/25 (10 overs)

Namibia won by 96 runs
Newforge, Belfast
Umpires: Kevan Barbour (ZIM) & Sarika Prasad
Player of the match: Kola Burger

- Papua New Guinea won the toss and elected to field.

Namibia (252) got off the board with a comfortable victory over Papua New Guinea (156).

2 July 2005
Scorecard

Netherlands; 325/5 (50 overs)	v	Oman; 67 (24.1 overs)
Bas Zuiderent 119 (152); Hemin Desai 3/77 (10 overs)		Mohammad Asif 16 (36); Ryan ten Doeschate 4/22 (5 overs)

Netherlands won by 258 runs
Carrickfergus Cricket Club, Middle Road, Carrickfergus
Umpires: Asoka de Silva (SRI) & Shahul Hameed (Indonesia)
Player of the match: Bas Zuiderent

- Oman won the toss and elected to field.

Bas Zuiderent made 119 and Daan van Bunge 92 as Netherlands piled on the runs, whereas only one Omani scored in doubled figures as Oman (67) were completely thrashed by Netherlands (325 for 5) by 258 runs.

4 July 2005
Scorecard

Oman; 184 (48.5 overs)	v	Canada; 187/8 (47.1 overs)
Hemin Desai 76 (84); Sunil Dhaniram 3/30 (10 overs)		John Davison 74 (53); Tariq Hussain 3/32 (10 overs)

Canada won by 2 wickets
Muckamore Cricket Club, Muckamore
Umpires: Asoka de Silva (SRI) & Trevor Henry
Player of the match: John Davison

- Oman won the toss and elected to bat.

Canada got into trouble against Oman – after having bowled them out for 184, wickets fell around John Davison – who made 74 – and Ian Billcliff, but eventually the Canadians snared a two-wicket win.

4 July 2005
Scorecard

Namibia; 188 (48.4 overs)	v	Netherlands; 189/4 (46.5 overs)
Danie Keulder 48 (105); Edgar Schiferli 4/50 (10 overs)		Bas Zuiderent 65* (150); Danie Keulder 2/31 (8 overs)

Netherlands won by 6 wickets
Osborne Park, Belfast
Umpires: Asad Rauf (PAK) & Roger Dill (BER)
Player of the match: Bas Zuiderent

- Netherlands won the toss and elected to field.

The Netherlands secured a win over Namibia, but the match was eventually much closer than it could have been. After Edgar Schiferli took four wickets for 50, helping with bowling Namibia out for 188, Bas Zuiderent and Tom de Grooth opened up a partnership of 135. Four quick wickets sent the Dutch struggling to 155 for 4, but Zuiderent and Ryan ten Doeschate saw them home.

4 July 2005
Scorecard

Papua New Guinea; 90 (35 overs)	v	Scotland; 92/5 (19 overs)
Asad Vala 39 (85); Dougie Brown 4/15 (9 overs)		Fraser Watts 26* (49); Ryan Watson 26 (24); Toka Gaudi 3/30 (8 overs)

Scotland won by 5 wickets
Instonians Cricket Club, Shaw's Bridge Lower Ground, Belfast
Umpires: Kevan Barbour (ZIM) & Buddhi Pradhan
Player of the match: John Blain

- Papua New Guinea won the toss and elected to bat.

Meanwhile, Papua New Guinea were bowled out for 90 by Scotland, John Blain and Dougie Brown taking four wickets each, but Toka Gaudi gave the Scots a scare with his three wickets. However, the Scots managed a five-wicket win.

5 July 2005
Scorecard

Scotland; 236/7 (33 overs)	v	Namibia; 209 (31.1 overs)
Ryan Watson 87 (82); Gerrie Snyman 4/41 (7 overs)		Gerrie Snyman 45 (28); Craig Wright 4/46 (7 overs)

Scotland won by 27 runs
Limavady Cricket Club, Limavady
Umpires: Trevor Henry (IRE) & Tony Hill (NZ)
Player of the match: Ryan Watson

- Namibia won the toss and elected to field.
- Rain reduced match to 33 overs per side.

Scotland (236 for 7) maintained their 100% record with a 27 run win against Namibia (209 all out) in a game reduced to 33 overs in which Ryan Watson starred with 87.

5 July 2005
Scorecard

Netherlands; 187/9 (35 overs)	v	Canada; 162/8 (29.5 overs)
Feiko Kloppenburg 57* (45); Umar Bhatti 2/31 (7 overs)		Desmond Chumney 64 (79); Billy Stelling 5/30 (6 overs)

Canada won by 2 wickets (D/L)
Woodvale Road, Eglinton
Umpires: Asoka de Sliva (SRI) & Roger Dill (BER)
Player of the match: Desmond Chumney

- Canada won the toss and elected to field.
- Rain reduced the match to 35 overs per side.
- Rain during Canada's innings reduced the innings to 30 overs. Revised target was 160 from 30 overs.

The Netherlands (187 for 9) batted first against Canada in a game reduced to 35 overs a side. A further 19 minute break for bad light meant the Canadians target was reduced to 160 in 30 overs. Despite 5 for 30 from Billy Stelling, Canada reached their target with one ball and 2 wickets to spare in an innings anchored by Desmond Chumney with 64.

5 July 2005
Scorecard

Papua New Guinea; 134/7 (24 overs)	v	Oman; 41 (15.1 overs)
Gimapau Keimelo 27 (18); Hemal Mehta 2/19 (5 overs)		Mohammad Asif 10 (19); Inoa Baeau 3/7 (5 overs)

Papua New Guinea won by 93 runs
Drummond Cricket CLub, Drummond
Umpires: Krishna Hariharan (IND) & Sarika Prasad (SIN)
Player of the match: Inoa Baeau

- Papua New Guinea won the toss and elected to bat.
- Rain reduced match to 24 overs per side.

Rain reduced Papua New Guinea's match against Oman to a 24 over-a-side affair. The Papuans reached 134 for 7 in their overs, before skittling the Omanis for 41 all out.

7 July 2005
Scorecard

Canada; 319/4 (50 overs)	v	Papua New Guinea; 159 (39.2 overs)
Ian Billcliff 102* (92); Gimapau Keimelo 3/66 (10 overs)		Mahuru Dai 52 (70 overs); Umar Bhatti 3/25 (8.2 overs)

Canada won by 160 runs
Strangford Road, Downpatrick
Umpires: Krishna Hariharan (IND) & Sarika Prasad (SIN)
Player of the match: Ian Billcliff

- Papua New Guinea won the toss and elected to field.

With Canada (319 for 4) winning heavily against Papua New Guinea (159 all out), thanks to Billcliff's 102* and Davison's 62, the Canadians made sure they qualified for the World Cup and ODI status on run-rate.

7 July 2005
Scorecard

Oman; 170/9 (50 overs)	v	Namibia; 173/4 (41.2 overs)
Awal Khan 60 (91); Deon Kotze 3/39 (10 overs)		Jan-Berrie Burger 49 (82); Rakesh Sharma 2/41 (10 overs)

Namibia won by 6 wickets
North Down Cricket Club, Comber
Umpires: Kevan Barbour (ZIM) & Roger Dill (BER)
Player of the match: Awal Khan

- Namibia won the toss and elected to field.

Namibia (173/4) easily overhauled Oman's score of 170 with almost nine overs to spare.

7 July 2005
Scorecard

Scotland; 221 (48.5 overs)	v	Netherlands; 123 (39.4 overs)
Cedric English 44 (87); Edgar Schiferli 3/39 (8 overs)		Ryan ten Doeschate 24 (36); Ryan Watson 4/24 (7.4 overs)

Scotland won by 98 runs
Civil Service Cricket Club, Stormont, Belfast
Umpires: Tony Hill (NZ) & Shahul Hameed (Indonesia)
Player of the match: Cedric English

- Netherlands won the toss and elected to field.

Scotland (221 all out) maintained their 100% record against the Netherlands (123 all out), which saw Scotland through to the semi-finals. The Netherlands, along with Namibia (173 for 4), who beat Oman (170 for 9) by 6 wickets, qualify for the 5th place semi-finals.

== 5th - 8th Knockout stage ==
=== 5th place semi-finals ===
9 July 2005
Scorecard

Netherlands; 314/6 (50 overs)	v	Denmark; 225 (48.3 overs)
Daan van Bunge 137 (118); Bas Zuiderent 107 (134); Thomas Hansen 3/41 (10 overs)		Frederik Klokker 52 (83); Pieter Seelaar 3/35 (10 overs)

Netherlands won by 89 runs
North County Cricket Club Ground, Dublin
Umpires: Asad Rauf (PAK) & Roger Dill (BER)
Player of the match: Daan van Bunge

- Netherlands won the toss and elected to bat.

9 July 2005
Scorecard

Namibia; 240/7 (50 overs)	v	United Arab Emirates; 242/6 (47 overs)
Gerrie Snyman 83* (63); Ali Asad 2/33 (10 overs)		Khurram Khan 92 (94); Gerrie Snyman 2/36 (9 overs)

United Arab Emirates won by 4 wickets
Malahide, Dublin
Umpires: Billy Doctrove (WIN) & Trevor Henry (IRE)
Player of the match: Khurram Khan

- United Arab Emirates won the toss and elected to field.

=== 5th place final ===
11 July
Scorecard

Netherlands; 287/4 (50 overs)	v	United Arab Emirates; 142 (31.3 overs)
Bas Zuiderent 116* (138); Ali Asad 2/34 (10 overs)		Fahad Usman 30 (24); Billy Stelling 3/33 (6.3 overs)

Netherlands won by 145 runs
Clontarf Cricket Club, Dublin
Umpires: Asoka de Silva (SRI) & Tony Hill (NZ)
Player of the match: Bas Zuiderent

- United Arab Emirates won the toss and elected to field.

=== 7th place play-off ===
11 July
Scorecard

Namibia; 230/9 (50 overs)	v	Denmark; 127 (37.3 overs)
Sarel Burger 40 (70); Bobby Chawla 3/42 (10 overs)		Baljit Singh 34 (43); Sarel Burger 5/23 (10 overs)

Namibia won by 103 runs
The Hills Cricket Club, Dublin
Umpires: Asad Rauf (PAK) & Kevan Barbour (ZIM)
Player of the match: Sarel Burger

- Namibia won the toss and elected to bat.

== 9th - 12th Knockout stage ==
=== 9th place semi-finals ===
9 July 2005
Scorecard

Oman; 181 (49.1 overs)	v	Uganda; 175 (48.5 overs)
Mohammad Aslam 39 (42); Patrick Ochan 3/26 (10 overs)		Kenneth Kamyuka 50 (117); Tariq Hussain 3/29 (10 overs)

Oman won by 6 runs
Observatory Lane, Rathmines, Dublin
Umpires: Krishna Hariharan (IND) & Subhash Modi
Player of the match: Kenneth Kamyuka

- Oman won the toss and elected to bat.

9 July 2005
Scorecard

Papua New Guinea; 171 (43.1 overs)	v	United States; 175/2 (32 overs)
Extras (b 8, lb 8, w 24, nb 4) 44; Ipi Morea 25 (36); Imran Awan 4/46 (7 overs)		Steve Massiah 56* (84); Gowkaran Roopnarine 56* (50); Hitolo Areni 1/39 (7 overs); Rarva Dikana 1/39 (6 overs)

United States won by 8 wickets
Merrion Cricket Club, Dublin
Umpires: Asoka de Silva (SRI) & Buddhi Pradhan (NEP)
Player of the match: Steve Massiah

- United States won the toss and elected to field.

=== 9th place final ===
11 July
Scorecard

United States; 345/6 (50 overs)	v	Oman; 348/7 (49.1 overs)
Gowkaran Roopnarine 98 (108); Tariq Hussain 1/38 (4 overs)		Farhan Khan 94* (47); Hamish Anthony 2/47 (9.1 overs)

Oman won by 3 wickets
North County Cricket Club, Dublin
Umpires: Roger Dill (BER) & Trevor Henry (IRE)
Player of the match: Farhan Khan

- United States won the toss and elected to bat.

=== 11th place play-off ===
11 July
Scorecard

Papua New Guinea; 203 (49.5 overs)	v	Uganda; 202/9 (50 overs)
Arua Uda 49 (79); Emmanuel Isaneez 4/48 (10 overs)		Kenneth Kamyuka 126* (138); Hitolo Areni 4/37 (9 overs)

Papua New Guinea won by 1 run
Observatory Lane, Rathmines, Dublin
Umpires: Subhash Modi (KEN) & Buddhi Pradhan (NEP)
Player of the match: Kenneth Kamyuka

- Papua New Guinea won the toss and elected to bat.

== Knockout stage ==
=== Semi-finals ===
9 July
Scorecard

Canada; 238/9 (50 overs)	v	Ireland; 241/6 (49.2 overs)
Desmond Chumney 35 (67); Sunil Dhaniram 35 (48); Andre Botha 4/47 (9 overs)		Peter Gillespie 64* (70); Kevin Sandher 3/46 (10 overs)

Ireland won by 4 wickets
Clontarf Cricket Club, Dublin
Umpires: Tony Hill (NZ) & Sarika Prasad (SIN)
Player of the match: Peter Gillespie

- Ireland won the toss and elected to field.

9 July
Scorecard

Bermuda; 219/9 (50 overs)	v	Scotland; 222/4 (46.5 overs)
Dean Minors 53* (53); Paul Hoffmann 3/28 (9 overs)		Cedric English 75* (111); Dennis Archer 3/40 (10 overs)

Scotland won by 6 wickets
The Hills Cricket Club, Dublin
Umpires: Kevan Barbour (ZIM) & Shahul Hameed (Indonesia)
Player of the match: Cedric English

- Bermuda won the toss and elected to bat.

=== 3rd place play-off ===
11 July
Scorecard

Bermuda; 195 (48.5 overs)	v	Canada; 197/5 (43.2 overs)
Irving Romaine 71 (90); Sanjayan Thuraisingam 2/16 (9.5 overs)		Zubin Surkari 47 (62); Saleem Mukuddem 2/41 (10 overs)

Canada won by 5 wickets
Malahide, Dublin
Umpires: Billy Doctrove (WIN) & Shahul Hameed (Indonesia)
Player of the match: Ian Billcliff

- Bermuda won the toss and elected to bat.

=== Final ===
13 July
Scorecard

Scotland; 324/8 (50.0 overs)	v	Ireland; 277/9 (50.0 overs)
Ryan Watson 94 (99); Gordon Cooke 3/70 (9 overs)		Ed Joyce 81 (82); Craig Wright 3/48 (7 overs)

Scotland won by 47 runs
Clontarf Cricket Club Ground, Dublin
Umpires: Tony Hill (NZ) and Shahul Hameed (Ina)
Player of the match: Ryan Watson (Sco)

- Ireland won the toss and elected to field.

== Final standings ==
Position	Team	Status
1st	Scotland	Qualified for the 2007 World Cup and gained ODI status until 2009
2nd	Ireland	Qualified for the 2007 World Cup and gained ODI status until 2009
3rd	Canada	Qualified for the 2007 World Cup and gained ODI status until 2009
4th	Bermuda	Qualified for the 2007 World Cup and gained ODI status until 2009
5th	Netherlands	Qualified for the 2007 World Cup and gained ODI status until 2009
6th	United Arab Emirates	Relegated to 2007 Division One
7th	Namibia	Relegated to 2007 Division One
8th	Denmark	Relegated to 2007 Division One
9th	Oman	Relegated to 2007 Division One
10th	United States^{1}	Relegated to 2007 Division One
11th	Papua New Guinea	Relegated to 2007 Division One
12th	Uganda	Relegated to 2007 Division One

^{1} – On August 9, 2005 the ICC expelled the USA, which saw them not compete in the 2007 Division One.

== Leading batsmen ==
2005 ICC Trophy – leading batsmen by runs
Name	Team	Runs	Bat avg
Bas Zuiderent	Netherlands	474	118.50
Ed Joyce	Ireland	399	99.75
Ian Billcliff	Canada	315	78.75
John Davison	Canada	312	44.57
Daan van Bunge	Netherlands	291	48.50
Kenneth Kamyuka	Uganda	246	61.50
Khurram Khan	United Arab Emirates	239	39.83
Steve Massiah	USA	232	58.00
Janeiro Tucker	Bermuda	232	46.40
Gerrie Snyman	Namibia	228	45.60

== Leading bowlers ==
2005 ICC Trophy – leading bowlers by wickets taken
Name	Team	Wickets	Bowl avg
Paul Hoffmann	Scotland	17	10.17
Edgar Schiferli	Netherlands	17	14.64
Ryan ten Doeschate	Netherlands	15	9.73
Thomas Hansen	Denmark	15	14.00
Kevin Sandher	Canada	13	14.07
Sarel Burger	Namibia	13	16.69
Hamish Anthony	USA	12	19.50
Trent Johnston	Ireland	12	21.08
Billy Stelling	Netherlands	11	14.81
Dougie Brown	Scotland	11	16.18
John Blain	Scotland	11	18.90
Kenneth Kamyuka	Uganda	11	21.72
Ahmed Nadeem	United Arab Emirates	11	23.00
David Borchersen	Denmark	11	23.18

== See also ==
- ICC Trophy
- 2005 ICC Intercontinental Cup
- ICC Intercontinental Cup
