= 2007 World Cricket League Division One =

International cricket tournament

2007 ICC World Cricket League Division One
- Dates: 29 January – 7 February 2007
- Administrator: International Cricket Council
- Cricket format: One Day International
- Tournament format(s): Round-robin and final
- Host: Kenya
- Champions: Kenya
- Runners-up: Scotland
- Participants: 6
- Matches: 16
- Player of the series: (Canada) Ashish Bagai

The 2007 ICC World Cricket League Division One was a One Day International cricket tournament played from 29 January 2007 to 7 February 2007 in Nairobi, Kenya. Division One, which is the successor to the now defunct ICC 6 Nations Challenge, is the highest tier of the World Cricket League, and is effectively the second level of cricket below the 10 Test-playing nations. This tournament served as an important warm-up for the 2007 Cricket World Cup that took place in the West Indies in March 2007. The tournament featured the six Associate members in the 2007 Cricket World Cup, who qualified for the Cricket World Cup as hosts and through the 2005 ICC Trophy.

Games were played at Nairobi Gymkhana Club, Ruaraka Sports Club and Jaffery Sports Club, all located in Nairobi.

== Points table ==
Pos	Team	Pld	W	L	Pts	NRR
1	Kenya	5	4	1	8	1.355
2	Scotland	5	4	1	8	0.354
3	Netherlands	5	3	2	6	0.120
4	Canada	5	2	3	4	−0.849
5	Ireland	5	1	4	2	−0.061
6	Bermuda	5	1	4	2	−1.310

Source: ESPNcricinfo

Scotland and Kenya qualified for the final which was won by Kenya. Both qualified for the 2007 Twenty20 Cricket World Championship to be held in South Africa in September.

1st Match

29 January 2007
Scorecard

Bermuda; 133 (39.3 overs)	v	Kenya; 137/0 (18.1 overs)
DA Minors 52 (76); PJC Ongondo 3/23 (8)		DO Obuya 74* (59); DCC Borden 0/11 (2)

Kenya won by 10 wickets
Jaffery Sports Club Ground, Nairobi, Kenya
Umpires: N Shah (BAN) and TH Wijewardene (SRI)
Player of the match: DO Obuya (KEN)

2nd Match

30 January 2007
Scorecard

Canada; 200 (44 overs)	v	Netherlands; 201/2 (35 overs)
A Bagai 74 (117); RN ten Doeschate 4/31 (7)		B Zuiderent 77* (103); H Osinde 2/64 (10)

Netherlands won by 8 wickets
Ruaraka Sports Club Ground, Nairobi, Kenya
Umpires: GA Baxter (NZL) and M Shahul Hameed (IDN)
Player of the match: B Zuiderent (NED)

3rd Match

30 January 2007
Scorecard

Ireland; 280/7 (50 overs)	v	Scotland; 284/7 (50 overs)
JP Bray 116 (136); PJC Hoffmann 3/44 (10)		NFI McCallum 100 (92); AC Botha 3/46 (10)

Scotland won by 3 wickets
Nairobi Gymkhana Club, Nairobi, Kenya
Umpires: R Dill (BER) and DB Hair (AUS)
Player of the match: NFI McCallum (SCO)

4th Match

31 January 2007
Scorecard

Bermuda; 275/8 (50 overs)	v	Ireland; 276/6 (48.4 overs)
CJ Smith 52 (47); AC Botha 3/74 (10)		WTS Porterfield 112 (142); RDM Leverock 2/34 (10)

Ireland won by 4 wickets
Jaffery Sports Club Ground, Nairobi, Kenya
Umpires: SR Modi (KEN) and N Shah (BAN)
Player of the match: WTS Porterfield (IRL)

- Kenny Carroll and Boyd Rankin (Ire) both made their ODI debuts.

5th Match

31 January 2007
Scorecard

Scotland; 276/4 (50 overs)	v	Canada; 269/9 (50 overs)
DF Watts 70 (106); U Bhatti 1/32 (10)		A Bagai 137* (172); CM Wright 3/46 (10)

Scotland won by 7 runs
Ruaraka Sports Club Ground, Nairobi, Kenya
Umpires: GA Baxter (NZL) and R Dill (BER)
Player of the match: A Bagai (CAN)

6th Match

31 January 2007
Scorecard

Netherlands; 131 (46.2 overs)	v	Kenya; 133/3 (32.1 overs)
DLS van Bunge 29 (59); TM Odoyo 3/29 (8)		MA Ouma 47 (69); TBM de Leede 2/28 (7.1)

Kenya won by 7 wickets
Nairobi Gymkhana Club, Nairobi, Kenya
Umpires: M Shahul Hameed (IDN) and TH Wijewardene (SRI)
Player of the match: MA Ouma (KEN)

7th Match

2 February 2007
Scorecard

Canada; 162/8 (21 overs)	v	Bermuda; 106 (15.5 overs)
JM Davison 69* (49); MO Jones 2/25 (5)		LOB Cann 41 (19); S Dhaniram 4/10 (2.5)

Canada won by 56 runs (DL)
Nairobi Gymkhana Club, Nairobi, Kenya
Umpires: DB Hair (AUS) and TH Wijewardene (SRI)
Player of the match: JM Davison (CAN)

- Match shortened due to rain; Duckworth–Lewis revised target to win: 163 runs in 21 overs for Bermuda.

8th Match

2 February 2007
Scorecard

Ireland; 284/4 (50 overs)	v	Kenya; 286/9 (49 overs)
KJ O'Brien 142 (125); PJC Ongondo 2/33 (8)		N Odhiambo 66 (83); WK McCallan 4/36 (10)

Kenya won by 1 wicket
Ruaraka Sports Club Ground, Nairobi, Kenya
Umpires: GA Baxter (NZL) and M Shahul Hameed (IDN)
Player of the match: TM Odoyo (KEN)

9th Match

2 February 2007
Scorecard

Scotland; 207/8 (37 overs)	v	Netherlands; 205 (36.5 overs)
DF Watts 58 (68); WF Stelling 2/41 (8)		WF Stelling 45 (51); PJC Hoffmann 3/33 (6.5)

Scotland won by 2 runs (DL)
Jaffery Sports Club Ground, Nairobi, Kenya
Umpires: R Dill (BER) and N Shah (BAN)
Player of the match: PJC Hoffmann (SCO)

- Match shortened due to rain; Duckworth–Lewis revised target to win: 208 runs in 37 overs for the Netherlands.

10th Match

4 February 2007
Scorecard

Bermuda; 194 (46.3 overs)	v	Netherlands; 198/2 (43.1 overs)
DL Hemp 58 (98); M Kashif 3/42 (10)		RN ten Doeschate 109* (125); KAD Hurdle 1/41 (10)

Netherlands won by 8 wickets
Ruaraka Sports Club Ground, Nairobi, Kenya
Umpires: M Shahul Hameed (IDN) and TH Wijewardene (SRI)
Player of the match: RN ten Doeschate (NED)

- Josclyn Pitcher (Ber) made his ODI debut.

11th Match

4 February 2007
Scorecard

Ireland; 308/7 (50 overs)	v	Canada; 312/4 (49.4 overs)
EJG Morgan 115 (106); U Bhatti 2/35 (10)		A Bagai 122 (132); KJ O'Brien 1/34 (7)

Canada won by 6 wickets
Jaffery Sports Club Ground, Nairobi, Kenya
Umpires: R Dill (BER) and N Shah (BAN)
Player of the match: A Bagai (CAN)

- EJG Morgan scored his first century in ODIs.

12th Match

4 February 2007
Scorecard

Scotland; 254/8 (50 overs)	v	Kenya; 177 (46 overs)
RM Haq 71 (108); SO Tikolo 3/46 (10)		TM Odoyo 53 (76); RM Haq 3/26 (9)

Scotland won by 77 runs
Nairobi Gymkhana Club, Nairobi, Kenya
Umpires: GA Baxter (NZL) and DB Hair (AUS)
Player of the match: RM Haq (SCO)

13th Match

5 February 2007
Scorecard

Scotland; 268/9 (50 overs)	v	Bermuda; 269/5 (49 overs)
GM Hamilton 79 (86); SKW Kelly 3/47 (10)		IH Romaine 85* (86); CM Wright 2/38 (9)

Bermuda won by 5 wickets
Ruaraka Sports Club Ground, Nairobi, Kenya
Umpires: N Shah (BAN) and M Shahul Hameed (IDN)
Player of the match: IH Romaine (BER)

14th Match

5 February 2007
Scorecard

Kenya; 250/9 (50 overs)	v	Canada; 92 (14.5 overs)
T Mishra 62 (77); H Osinde 4/33 (10)		GR Codrington 24 (20); PJC Ongondo 5/51 (7)

Kenya won by 158 runs
Jaffery Sports Club Ground, Nairobi, Kenya
Umpires: R Dill (BER) and TH Wijewardene (SRI)
Player of the match: TM Odoyo (KEN)

15th Match

5 February 2007
Scorecard

Netherlands; 260/7 (46 overs)	v	Ireland; 254/8 (46 overs)
DJ Reekers 104 (82); AC Botha 2/49 (9)		EJG Morgan 94 (91); RN ten Doeschate 4/56 (10)

Netherlands won by 6 runs (DL)
Nairobi Gymkhana Club, Nairobi, Kenya
Umpires: GA Baxter (NZL) and SR Modi (KEN)
Player of the match: DJ Reekers (NED)

- Match shortened due to rain; Duckworth–Lewis revised target to win: 261 runs in 46 overs for Ireland.

== Final ==
7 February 2007
Scorecard

Scotland; 155 (47 overs)	v	Kenya; 158/2 (37.5 overs)
CM Wright 30 (45); L Onyango 3/43 (10)		DO Obuya 93 (116); RT Lyons 1/44 (8)

Kenya won by 8 wickets
Nairobi Gymkhana Club, Nairobi, Kenya
Umpires: GA Baxter (NZL) and DB Hair (AUS)
Player of the match: DO Obuya (KEN)

== Statistics ==
Most Runs		Most Wickets	
Name	Number	Name	Number
A Bagai (CAN)	345	PJC Ongondo (KEN)	15
WTS Porterfield (IRL)	332	RN ten Doeschate (NED)	13
DO Obuya (KEN)	271	AC Botha (IRL)	13

Player of the Tournament was A Bagai for his 345 runs, and his performance as wicket-keeper for Canada: 4 catches and 1 stumping.

== See also ==
- World Cricket League
- ICC Six Nations Challenge
