= David Cox =

David or Dave Cox may refer to:

== Arts and entertainment ==
- David Cox (artist) (1783–1859), British landscapist
- David Cox Jr. (1809–1885), British landscapist
- David Cox (composer) (1916–1997), British composer

== Sports ==
- David Cox (1960s cricketer) (born 1946), British cricketer
- David Cox (gymnast) (born 1970), British Olympic gymnast
- David Cox (1990s cricketer) (born 1972), British cricketer
- David Cox (Scottish cricketer) (born 1973), Scottish cricketer
- David Cox (basketball) (born 1973), American college basketball coach
- David Cox (footballer) (born 1989), Scottish footballer
- David Cox (pole vaulter) (born 1972), American pole vaulter, 1996 NCAA outdoor runner-up for the Fresno State Bulldogs track and field team

== Others ==
- David Cox (historian and mountaineer) (1913–1994), (Anthony David Machell Cox)
- David Cox (statistician) (1924–2022), English statistician
- Dave Cox (1938–2010), American politician
- David A. Cox (born 1948), American mathematician
- David Cox (Australian politician) (born 1954), Australian federal politician
- David Cox (Marine) (1966–1994), U.S. Marine found killed by an unknown assailant
- David Neal Cox (1970–2021), American convicted murderer
