= Jesper Hansen =

Jesper Hansen may refer to:

- Jesper Hansen (footballer, born 1985), Danish football player
- Jesper Hansen (cricketer) (born 1980), Danish cricketer
- Jesper Hansen (football manager) (born 1963), Danish football manager and former player
- Jesper Hansen (sport shooter), Danish sport shooter
- Jesper Hansen (cyclist) (born 1990), Danish cyclist
