= Javed Ismail =

Pakistani cricketer (born 1976)

Personal information
- Born: 2 December 1976 (age 49); Lahore, Pakistan
- Batting: Right-handed
- Bowling: Right-arm off-spin

International information
- National side: United Arab Emirates (2004–2007)

Domestic team information
- Years: Team
- 1995–1996: Pakistan Railways
- 1997–1998: Lahore City
- 1998: WAPDA
- Source: CricketArchive, 6 April 2016

Javed Ismail (born 2 December 1976) is a former Pakistani-born cricketer who played for the United Arab Emirates national cricket team between 2004 and 2007. He was born in Pakistan, and played first-class cricket there before moving to the UAE.

Ismail made his first-class debut at the age of 18, playing for Pakistan Railways in the 1995–96 Patron's Trophy. On his limited-overs debut, which came in the Wills Cup later in the season, he made 89 not out against Lahore City. Ismail subsequently switched to play for Lahore City for the 1996–97 season, but in two seasons with the team made only four appearances, all of which came in the Wills Cup. His final appearance in top-level Pakistani domestic cricket came in November 1998, when he represented the Water and Power Development Authority in a Patron's Trophy match against Habib Bank Limited.

After moving to the UAE, Ismail made his debut for the national team at the 2004 ACC Fast Track Countries Tournament, against Nepal. At the 2005 ICC Trophy in Ireland, he took seven wickets from seven games (behind only Ahmed Nadeem and Ali Asad for his team), with a best of 3/29 against Bermuda. He also made a half-century while batting against Ireland, scoring 56 runs from 37 balls. Over the following two years, Ismail represented the UAE at the 2006 ACC Trophy, the 2007–08 ICC Intercontinental Cup, the 2007 ACC Twenty20 Cup, and the 2007 World Cricket League Division Two tournament. He was aged 30 at the time of his last international appearance.
