= Wendell White =

Wendell White may refer to:

- Wendell White (cricketer) (born 1964), Bermudian cricketer
- Wendell White (basketball) (born 1984), American basketball player
