= Toka Gaudi =

Papua New Guinean cricketer (born 1972)

Personal information
- Born: 19 May 1972 (age 54); Port Moresby, Papua New Guinea
- Batting: Left-handed
- Bowling: Left-arm fast-medium
- Role: Bowler

Career statistics
Competition	List A	ICC T
Matches	7	21
Runs scored	45	61
Batting average	11.25	7.62
100s/50s	0/0	0/0
Top score	13*	13*
Balls bowled	312	915
Wickets	4	18
Bowling average	52.00	31.55
5 wickets in innings	0	0
10 wickets in match	0	0
Best bowling	3/30	4/23
Catches/stumpings	2/0	4/0
- Source: CricketArchive, 14 July 2006

Toka Gaudi (born 19 May 1972) is a Papua New Guinean cricketer. A left-handed batsman and left-arm fast-medium bowler, he played for the Papua New Guinea national cricket team between 1994 and 2005.

== Biography ==
Born in Port Moresby in 1972, Toka Gaudi made his debut for Papua New Guinea in the 1994 ICC Trophy in Nairobi, his first match coming against Gibraltar. He played in the 1996 ACC Trophy in Malaysia followed by the 1997 ICC Trophy, also in Malaysia.

After playing in the 1998 ACC Trophy in Nepal, he next played for Papua New Guinea in the 2001 Pacifica Cup in Auckland. He played in the 2001 ICC Trophy in Ontario the same year and the Pacifica Cup again in 2002. He played for a combined East Asia Pacific team in the Australian National Country Cricket Championships in 2004 and 2005.

In 2005 he played in the repêchage tournament of the 2005 ICC Trophy. Papua New Guinea won the tournament after beating Fiji in the final. This qualified them for the 2005 ICC Trophy in Ireland in which Gaudi played, making his List A debut. The 11th place play-off match against Uganda was his last match for Papua New Guinea.
