= Arua Uda =

Papua New Guinean cricketer (born 1974)

Personal information
- Born: 16 April 1974 (age 52); Papua New Guinea
- Batting: Right-handed
- Role: Wicket-keeper

Career statistics
| Competition | List A | ICC Trophy |
|---|---|---|
| Matches | 7 | 12 |
| Runs scored | 67 | 187 |
| Batting average | 9.57 | 15.58 |
| 100s/50s | 0/0 | 0/0 |
| Top score | 49 | 49 |
| Balls bowled | 36 | 36 |
| Wickets | 0 | 0 |
| Bowling average | – | – |
| 5 wickets in innings | – | – |
| 10 wickets in match | – | – |
| Best bowling | – | – |
| Catches/stumpings | 1/0 | 4/0 |
- Source: CricketArchive, 13 July 2008

Arua Uda (born 16 April 1974) is a Papua New Guinean cricketer. A right-handed batsman and wicket-keeper, he has played for the Papua New Guinea national cricket team since 1996.

== Biography ==
Born in Papua New Guinea in 1974, Arua Uda first represented Papua New Guinea at the 1996 ACC Trophy in Malaysia. It would be almost five years before his next appearance, at the 2001 Pacifica Cup in Auckland, where Papua New Guinea finished third. He played in the ICC Trophy later in the year and in the Pacifica Cup again the next year.

In 2003 he won a gold medal at the South Pacific Games when Papua New Guinea beat Fiji in the final of the cricket tournament. He played for a combined East Asia Pacific team in the Australian National Country Cricket Championships in 2004, doing the same in 2005 and 2006.

In 2005, he played in the repêchage tournament of the 2005 ICC Trophy. Papua New Guinea won the tournament after beating Fiji in the final. This qualified them for the 2005 ICC Trophy in Ireland in which Uda played, making his List A debut.

In 2007, he played in Division Three of the World Cricket League in Darwin and most recently represented his country in the cricket tournament of the 2007 South Pacific Games in Apia, Samoa, where he won a second gold medal.
