= Keith Legesi =

Ugandan cricketer

Personal information
- Born: 19 December 1981 (age 44); Kampala, Uganda
- Nickname: Moin Khan
- Batting: Right-handed
- Role: Right-arm medium

International information
- National side: Uganda (2001–2007)
- Source: CricketArchive, 2 February 2016

Keith Legesi (born 19 December 1981) is a former Ugandan international cricketer who represented the Ugandan national team between 2001 and 2007. He played as a wicket-keeper.

Born in Kampala, Legesi represented the Uganda under-19s at the 2001 Africa Under-19 Championship, playing three matches. He made his senior debut for Uganda at the 2001 ICC Trophy in Canada, although he played in only a single match at the tournament, substituting for Lawrence Sematimba against Israel. In 2004, Legesi played two Intercontinental Cup matches for Uganda, against Namibia and Kenya. The following year, at the 2005 ICC Trophy in Ireland, he featured in all but one of his team's seven matches. He had little success as a batsman, however, scoring 63 runs in five innings (with a best of 39 against the United Arab Emirates). Legesi's final matches for Uganda came in January 2007, when he played against Bermuda and Canada prior to those teams participating in the 2007 World Cricket League Division One tournament in Kenya.
