= Ipi Morea =

Papua New Guinean cricketer (born 1975)

Personal information
- Born: 6 May 1975 (age 51); Port Moresby, Papua New Guinea
- Batting: Right-handed
- Role: Wicket-keeper

Career statistics
| Competition | List A | ICC T |
|---|---|---|
| Matches | 7 | 12 |
| Runs scored | 128 | 177 |
| Batting average | 21.33 | 17.70 |
| 100s/50s | 0/0 | 0/0 |
| Top score | 41 | 41 |
| Catches/stumpings | 4/1 | 9/2 |
- Source: CricketArchive, 14 July 2008

Ipi Morea (born 6 May 1975) is a Papua New Guinean cricketer. A right-handed batsman and wicket-keeper, he played for the Papua New Guinea national cricket team between 1996 and 2005.

== Biography ==
Born in Port Moresby in 1975, Ipi Morea first played for Papua New Guinea in the 1996 ACC Trophy in Malaysia. This was followed the next year by an appearance in the 1997 ICC Trophy, also in Malaysia and a second ACC Trophy, in Nepal, in 1998.

It would be nearly four years before he played again for Papua New Guinea, returning for the 2002 Pacifica Cup in Apia. The following year he represented Papua New Guinea at the 2003 South Pacific Games, winning a gold medal in the cricket tournament. In 2004 and 2005, he played for a combined East Asia Pacific team in the Australian National Country Cricket Championship.

Also in 2005, he played in the repêchage tournament of the 2005 ICC Trophy. Papua New Guinea won the tournament after beating Fiji in the final. This qualified them for the 2005 ICC Trophy in Ireland in which Morea played, making his List A debut.

He has not played for Papua New Guinea since 2005 but has continued to play for the combined East Asia Pacific Team in the Australian National Country Cricket Championships in 2006, 2007 and 2008. He was named the fielder of the tournament in 2006.
