= Inoa Baeau =

Papua New Guinean cricketer

Personal information
- Full name: Inoa Baeau
- Born: 21 September 1982 (age 44); Port Moresby, Papua New Guinea
- Batting: Left-handed
- Bowling: Right-arm medium

Career statistics
Competition	List A
Matches	2
Runs scored	22
Batting average	22.00
100s/50s	0/0
Top score	22
Balls bowled	72
Wickets	3
Bowling average	27.33
5 wickets in innings	0
10 wickets in match	0
Best bowling	3/7
Catches/stumpings	0/–
Medal record
Representing Papua New Guinea
Men's Cricket
South Pacific Games
Gold medal – first place	2003 Suva	50 over cricket
- Source: Cricket Archive, 14 October 2007

Inoa Baeau (born 21 September 1982) is a Papua New Guinean cricketer. A left-handed batsman and right-arm medium pace bowler, he has played for the Papua New Guinea national cricket team since 2003.

== Career ==
Baeau's first taste of representative cricket came in 2004, when he represented a combined East Asia/Pacific team in the Australian national country cricket championships. He played for the same team in the 2005 and 2007 tournaments also.

He made his debut for Papua New Guinea at the repêchage tournament for the 2005 ICC Trophy. Papua New Guinea beat Fiji in the final, to qualify for the 2005 ICC Trophy in Ireland, where Baeau made his List A debut against Oman, winning the man of the match award after taking three wickets in the Oman innings.

He most recently played for Papua New Guinea at Division Three of the World Cricket League in Darwin, Australia.
