= Kauna Vagi =

Papua New Guinean cricketer (born 1976)

Personal information
- Born: 6 May 1976 (age 50); Port Moresby, Papua New Guinea
- Batting: Right-handed
- Bowling: Right-arm medium pace
- Role: Batsman

Career statistics
Competition	List A
Matches	2
Runs scored	5
Batting average	2.50
100s/50s	0/0
Top score	5
Catches/stumpings	0/0
- Source: CricketArchive, 14 July 2008

Kauna Vagi (born 6 May 1976) is a Papua New Guinean cricketer. A right-handed batsman and right-arm medium pace bowler, he played for the Papua New Guinea national cricket team in the repêchage tournament of the 2005 ICC Trophy and in the ICC Trophy tournament itself, where he played his two List A matches.
