= Donald Maxwell =

Don or Donald Maxwell may refer to:

- Don Maxwell (born 1971), Canadian cricket player
- Donald Maxwell (illustrator) (1877-1936), English illustrator
- Donald Maxwell (baritone) (born 1948), Scottish baritone
- Don Maxwell (actor), American actor in Midnight Madness
