= Thomas Hansen (cricketer) =

Danish cricketer (born 1976)

Personal information
- Full name: Thomas Munkholt Hansen
- Born: 25 March 1976 (age 50); Glostrup, Region Hovedstaden, Denmark
- Batting: Right-handed
- Bowling: Left-arm fast-medium

International information
- National side: Denmark

Domestic team information
- Years: Team
- 1997–1999: Hampshire (squad no. 8)
- 2000–2004: Denmark (squad no. 20)

Career statistics
Competition	First-class	List A
Matches	4	23
Runs scored	64	270
Batting average	24	22.50
100s/50s	–/–	–/1
Top score	12.80	51
Balls bowled	540	967
Wickets	5	33
Bowling average	54.20	21.03
5 wickets in innings	–	1
10 wickets in match	–	–
Best bowling	3/59	6/30
Catches/stumpings	–/–	6/–
- Source: Cricinfo, 3 January 2010

Thomas Munkholt Hansen (born 25 March 1976) is a Danish former cricketer who played county cricket for Hampshire in English county cricket between 1997 and 1999, making four first-class appearances. After leaving Hampshire, Hansen established himself in the Danish national team, representing it in the ICC Trophy and List A one-day cricket until 2009. He made 23 one-day appearances for Denmark, taking 33 wickets and scoring 270 runs.

== Cricket career ==
=== Early and county career ===
Thomas Munkholt Hansen was born on 26 March 1976 in Glostrup, Region Hovedstaden. He first played cricket when he was nine years old, following his father, who played for Denmark, into the sport. He began playing club cricket for Svanholm, and captained the Denmark Under-19 team. Hansen made his international debut for Denmark against Malaysia in the 1997 ICC Trophy, making five appearances and taking 10 wickets with his left-arm fast-medium bowling across the tournaments at a bowling average of 14.30; his best performance in the tournament came against Canada when he took 5 wickets for 51 runs.

Hansen's was recommended by Ole Mortensen to English county Hampshire, with him being offered a trial by them in the 1997 season. He made his debut for the county in a first-class match against Worcestershire in Hampshire's final match in the 1997 County Championship. He was offered a contract ahead of the 1998 season, but injured his foot at the start of the season, ruling him out for the first month of the season. He did not play for Hampshire's first team in 1998, instead featuring in the Second XI Championship. In July, he represented Denmark in the European Cricket Championship in the Netherlands, where the Danes finished runners-up to the Netherlands. The following season he made three first-class appearances for Hampshire in the County Championship against Sussex, Northamptonshire, and Somerset. Hansen was released by the county at the end of the 1999 season. Playing four first-class matches for Hampshire, he took 5 wickets at 54.20, with best figures of 3 for 59, and scored 64 runs with a highest score of 24. After leaving Hampshire, Hansen played Second XI cricket for Leicestershire and Northamptonshire in 2000, though no contracts were forthcoming from either county.

=== Return to Denmark ===
Hansen was selected in Denmark's squad for the 2000 ICC Emerging Nations Tournament in Zimbabwe in April. He made his debut in List A one-day cricket against Zimbabwe A, and made four further appearances during the tournament, taking 9 wickets at an average of 14.11, and was the third highest wicket-taker in the competition. The following, he played for Denmark in England's domestic one-day tournament, the NatWest Trophy, appearing in a first round loss against the Durham Cricket Board at Hartlepool. He made eight appearances in the 2001 ICC Trophy in Canada, taking 11 wickets at 13.81. In July 2002, he played for Denmark in the European Cricket Championship in Northern Ireland, making four appearances. The following month, he made a one-day appearance in England when Denmark were defeated by the Leicestershire Cricket Board in the first round of the 2003 Cheltenham & Gloucester Trophy, a fixture which was played in 2002 prior to the participation of the first-class counties in the third round following season.

In July 2004, Hansen made four appearances in the European Cricket Championship in the Netherlands, but took just one wicket. The following month, he played in the 2004 Cheltenham & Gloucester Trophy first round defeat to Wales Minor Counties at Abergavenny, with the first round matches being played the season before once more. Hansen played in his third ICC Trophy in 2005, which was held in Ireland. In a change from previous tournaments, matches held List A status. He made six appearances during the tournament, taking 15 wickets at 14, he took his only one-day five wicket haul against Uganda, with 6 for 30 in a Danish victory by 28 runs. He also scored a half-century, making 51 runs in a 93 run defeat to Bermuda. In 2006, he once against played in the European Championship, making two appearances in Division One, against Ireland and Italy. In August of the following year, he 7 for 13 in a friendly against Bermuda at Brøndby, the best bowling figures for Denmark in international cricket, and hit the winning runs.

Hansen was selected in Denmark's squad for the World Cricket League Division Two, played in Namibia in November 2007. The matches in this competition held List A status, with Hansen playing in all six of Denmark's matches, and taking 5 wickets at 34.40. Denmark finished the tournament in fourth place, earning a spot in the 2009 World Cup Qualifier. In July 2008, he played three matches Division One of the European Championship, held in Ireland. He was selected in Denmark's squad for the World Cup Qualifier, played in South Africa in April 2009. He injured his hand during the tournament, restricting him to appearing in three matches against Afghanistan, the Netherlands and Bermuda, as a result. These marked his last List A appearances for Denmark, with Hansen having played 23 one-day matches and taken 33 wickets at 21.30, alongside 270 runs a batting average of 22.50.

== Personal life ==
Outside of cricket, Hansen worked as a banker for Danske Bank in Copenhagen, and continued to play club cricket for Svanholm.
