= Hamish Anthony =

West Indian cricketer (born 1971)

Personal information
- Full name: Hamish Lundmax Anthony
- Born: 16 January 1971 (age 55); Urlings, Saint Mary
- Batting: Right-handed
- Bowling: Right-arm fast-medium
- Role: Allrounder
- Relatives: George Ferris (cousin)

International information
- National side: West Indies
- ODI debut (cap 74): 11 October 1995 v Sri Lanka
- Last ODI: 20 October 1995 v Sri Lanka

Domestic team information
- Years: Team
- 1989/90–1999/00: Leeward Islands
- 1990–1995: Glamorgan
- 2006–2007/08: United States Virgin Islands

Career statistics
Competition	ODI	FC	LA	T20
Matches	3	74	69	4
Runs scored	23	1,707	410	49
Batting average	7.66	17.24	10.78	12.25
100s/50s	0/0	0/7	0/0	0/0
Top score	21	91	39*	28
Balls bowled	156	11,344	3,160	78
Wickets	3	222	82	3
Bowling average	47.66	28.39	30.12	25.00
5 wickets in innings	0	6	2	0
10 wickets in match	0	1	0	0
Best bowling	2/47	6/22	7/15	2/16
Catches/stumpings	0/–	28/–	13/–	1/–
- Source: Cricinfo, 6 January 2013

Hamish Arbeb Gervais Anthony (born 16 January 1971) is a former West Indian cricketer. As a fast bowling allrounder, Anthony played for both the West Indies and the United States. He also featured for the Leeward Islands and Welsh side Glamorgan.

== Cricket career ==
Born in Urlings Village, Antigua, Anthony joined Glamorgan in 1990, after being recommended by his fellow countryman Viv Richards. Anthony scored two half centuries and picked up 56 wickets at an average of 33.36 in his 20 first class games for Glamorgan. He also snared 19 wickets at an average of 29.21 from a sum of 16 list A games for the Welsh side.

Anthony played for the Windies' in their 1991 tour of England. He later featured for the regional team in two one dayers at Sharjah Cricket Stadium and in the 1996/97 Hong Kong Sixes. In June 2005 Anthony was picked by the United States in their squad for the 2005 ICC Trophy. During the tournament, he took 5 for 46 against the UAE in an eventual losing effort.

== Personal life ==
Anthony is the cousin of fellow Leeward Islands cricketer George Ferris.
