= Gima Keimolo =

Papua New Guinean cricketer

Personal information
- Full name: Gimapau Gima Keimelo
- Born: 4 December 1982 (age 43); Papua New Guinea
- Batting: Right-handed
- Bowling: Right-arm Fast-medium
- Role: Bowler

Domestic team information
- Years: Team
- 1998–2005: Papua New Guinea
- LA debut: 1 July 2005 PNG v Netherlands
- Last LA: 11 July 2005 PNG v Uganda

Career statistics
Competition	List A	ICC Trophy
Matches	7	12
Runs scored	27	128
Batting average	15.16	11.63
100s/50s	0/0	0/0
Top score	27	27
Balls bowled	250	412
Wickets	8	8
Bowling average	34.50	50.62
5 wickets in innings	0	0
10 wickets in match	0	0
Best bowling	3/66	3/66
Catches/stumpings	2/–	4/–
- Source: CricketArchive, 14 October 2007

Gimapau Gima Keimelo, usually known as Gima Keimolo, (born 4 December 1982) is a Papua New Guinean cricketer. A right-handed batsman and right-arm fast-medium bowler, he has played for the Papua New Guinea national cricket team since 1998. He has also played rugby league, representing the Kumuls in 2007.

== Career ==
Keimolo's first taste of international cricket came at the 1998 Under-19 World Cup when he played for Papua New Guinea in four tournament matches. He made his debut for the senior team in October that year, playing in the ACC Trophy against Singapore aged just 15.

He next played for Papua New Guinea in the 2001 Pacifica Cup in Auckland, New Zealand, and played in the 2001 ICC Trophy in Canada later that year, following this by playing in the East Asia/Pacific Under-19 Championship for the Papua New Guinea Under-19 team, from which Papua New Guinea qualified for the 2002 Under-19 World Cup in Sri Lanka. He played in six matches of that tournament.

He returned to the senior side to make his List A debut in the 2005 ICC Trophy in Ireland. He has not played for Papua New Guinea since, though he did play for a combined East Asia/Pacific team in the Australia National Country Cricket Championships in 2006.
