= George Ferris (cricketer) =

West Indian cricketer (born 1964)

Personal information
- Full name: George John Fitzgerald Ferris
- Born: 18 October 1964 (age 62); Urlings, Saint Mary, Antigua
- Batting: Right-handed
- Bowling: Right-arm fast
- Role: Bowler

Domestic team information
- Years: Team
- 1982/83–1988/89: Leeward Islands
- 1983–1990: Leicestershire

Career statistics
Competition	First-class	List A
Matches	94	62
Runs scored	745	64
Batting average	12.21	6.40
100s/50s	0/0	0/0
Top score	36*	13*
Balls bowled	13,533	2,881
Wickets	286	75
Bowling average	25.71	26.85
5 wickets in innings	9	1
10 wickets in match	1	0
Best bowling	7/42	5/28
Catches/stumpings	13/–	9/–
- Source: Cricinfo, 24 April 2015

George John Fitzgerald Ferris (born 18 October 1964) is a former first-class cricketer who played for the Leeward Islands and Leicestershire. A right-arm fast bowler, Ferris took 286 wickets at 25.71 in his career between 1983 and 1990. His cousin Hamish Anthony played One Day International cricket for the West Indies. Ferris was born in Antigua.

Ferris became a regular in the Leicestershire side in the late 1980s when the other overseas Leicestershire player and fellow West Indian Winston Benjamin was on duty playing for the West Indies. Although Ferris played cricket for the Leeward Islands he was never selected by the West Indies due to the strength of the bowling attack the West Indies had at the time. He took his best figures in 1983 in his fourth match for Leicestershire, when he took 7 for 42 and 3 for 62; seven of his victims were out leg before wicket.

After his career ended he moved to Florida in the US.
