= Azhar Ali (Oman cricketer) =

Pakistani-born Omani cricketer (born 1968)

Personal information
- Full name: Syed Azhar Ali
- Born: 2 February 1968 (age 58); Karachi, Pakistan
- Batting: Right-handed
- Bowling: Right-arm off break

Domestic team information
- Years: Team
- 2004–06: Oman
- List A debut: 1 July 2005 Oman v Scotland
- Last List A: 11 July 2005 Oman v United States

Career statistics
Competition	List A
Matches	7
Runs scored	100
Batting average	16.66
100s/50s	0/0
Top score	44 not out
Balls bowled	2
Wickets	0
Bowling average	-
5 wickets in innings	0
10 wickets in match	0
Best bowling	0/4
Catches/stumpings	3/0
- Source: CricketArchive (subscription required), 10 July 2015

Syed Azhar Ali (Urdu: سید اظہر علی, born 2 February 1968) is a Pakistani-born former cricketer who played for the Oman national cricket team. He bowled right-arm off break. He captained Oman in the 2005 ICC Trophy.
