= Matthew Dwyer =

Cricket information
- Batting: Left-handed
- Bowling: Slow left-arm orthodox

International information
- National side: Ireland

Career statistics
| Competition | First-class | List A |
|---|---|---|
| Matches | 2 | 11 |
| Runs scored | 7 | 7 |
| Batting average | 3.50 | 7.00 |
| 100s/50s | 0/0 | 0/0 |
| Top score | 4* | 4 |
| Balls bowled | 294 | 642 |
| Wickets | 10 | 14 |
| Bowling average | 14.80 | 29.57 |
| 5 wickets in innings | 0 | 0 |
| 10 wickets in match | 0 | 0 |
| Best bowling | 4/57 | 3/31 |
| Catches/stumpings | 0/– | 4/– |
- Source: CricketArchive, 9 October 2022

Matthew Damian Dwyer (born 22 February 1959) is a former Irish cricketer.

A left-handed batsman and slow left-arm bowler, he was very much a late starter as far as international cricket is concerned, making his debut for the Ireland cricket team at the age of 39 against Glamorgan in May 1998. He went on to play for Ireland on 51 occasions, his last game coming against Australia in August 2001.

Of his matches for Ireland, two had first-class status and eleven had List A status. In all matches for Ireland, he scored 60 runs at an average of 6.67, with a top score of 12 not out against Scotland in July 2001. He took 62 wickets at an average of 25.87, with best bowling figures of 4/57 against Australia A in August 1998.

He played in four international tournaments for Ireland; the 2001 ICC Trophy, the European Championship in 1998 and 2000 and the ICC Emerging Nations tournament in 2000.

He was the assistant coach of the Ireland Senior Cricket during the 2007 World Cup in the West Indies, and in 2008 coached the Ireland Under 19 team. He also took charge of the Irish Women's Cricket team for three international games against the West Indies during the 2008 season while there were awaiting the appointment of a full-time coach.
