= Adrian McCoubrey =

Irish cricketer (born 1980)

Personal information
- Full name: Adrian George Agustus Mathew McCoubrey
- Born: 3 April 1980 (age 46); Ballymena, County Antrim, Northern Ireland
- Batting: Right-handed
- Bowling: Right-arm fast-medium

International information
- National side: Ireland

Career statistics
Competition	First-class	List A
Matches	14	15
Runs scored	15	22
Batting average	2.50	5.50
100s/50s	0/0	0/2
Top score	8*	11
Balls bowled	1704	534
Wickets	34	8
Bowling average	34.32	48.25
5 wickets in innings	0	0
10 wickets in match	0	n/a
Best bowling	4/16	3/19
Catches/stumpings	5/0	0/0
- Source: Cricket Archive

Adrian George Agustus Matthew McCoubrey (born 3 April 1980 in Ballymena, County Antrim, Northern Ireland) is an Irish cricketer. A right-handed batsman and right-arm fast-medium bowler, he has played 43 times for the Ireland cricket team since August 1999 including six first-class matches and twelve List A matches. He has also played first-class and List A cricket for Essex.

== Playing career ==
=== Early Ireland career ===
McCoubrey first represented Ireland at Under-19 level, when he played in the 1999 European Under-19 Championship. He made his debut for the senior side in August of that year, playing against Scotland in a first-class match. His second match for Ireland was in May 2000 when he played against the MCC, prior to an appearance in the European Championship that year. He also played a first-class match against Scotland before the year was out.

In 2001, he travelled with the Irish side to Canada to play in the 2001 ICC Trophy. Later in the year, he played against Australia before playing in the Triple Crown Tournament. This was followed by his first two List A matches, playing against Wiltshire and the Hampshire Cricket Board in the C & G Trophy.

He played a C & G Trophy match against Nottinghamshire in May 2002, before playing in the European Championship that year. This was followed by a C & G Trophy match against Berkshire, shortly before he signed with Essex.

=== Essex career ===
He made his debut for Essex in a national league match against Yorkshire on 5 May 2003, also playing in the same competition against Gloucestershire in July that year. He played two County Championship matches, against Leicestershire and Kent, the same month. He returned to the Ireland side in September that year for two matches against Denmark.

He was a regular member of the Essex side in the early part of the 2004 English cricket season, playing against Cambridge UCCE, in five County Championship matches and a National League match against Hampshire, but he did not play for Essex again after this point, and returned to playing regularly for Ireland, playing against the West Indies and Bangladesh in 2004.

=== Return to Irish side ===
Following matches against Loughborough UCCE, Warwickshire and a C & G Trophy match against Yorkshire, McCoubrey was named in the Ireland squad for the 2005 ICC Trophy, which was hosted in Ireland. He played four matches in the tournament, and played in four matches in that year's Intercontinental Cup, including the final against Kenya which Ireland won.

In 2006, he played three matches for Ireland in the newly restructured C & G Trophy; against Hampshire, Gloucestershire and Glamorgan, which are his last matches for Ireland to date.

=== Statistics ===
In all matches for Ireland, McCoubrey has scored 53 runs at an average of 4.42, with a top score of 11 against Berkshire in August 2002, also his top List A score. He has taken 52 wickets at an average of 26.92, with best innings bowling figures of 4/17 against Scotland in August 2005 also his best first-class bowling performance. In first-class cricket his top score is 8 not out for Ireland against Scotland. In List A cricket, his best bowling performance is 3/19 for Ireland against Uganda.
