= Mohammad Nadeem (Emirati cricketer) =

Emirati cricketer

Personal information
- Born: 30 July 1978 (age 48); Dubai, United Arab Emirates
- Batting: Right-handed
- Role: Wicket-keeper

International information
- National side: United Arab Emirates (1998–2007)
- Source: CricketArchive, 11 March 2016

Mohammad Nadeem (born 30 July 1978) is a former international cricketer who represented the United Arab Emirates national team between 1998 and 2007. He played as a wicket-keeper and batted right-handed.

Born in Dubai, Nadeem made his senior debut for the UAE at the 1998 ACC Trophy in Nepal. At the 2001 ICC Trophy in Canada, he had little success as a batsman (scoring 43 runs in ten matches), but recorded more dismissals than any other player, taking 17 catches and effecting four stumpings. Nadeem was the UAE's regular wicket-keeper during the early 2000s, making appearances for the team in the ACC Trophy, the Intercontinental Cup, and the Six Nations Challenge. However, he did not play in the 2004 Asia Cup, where the UAE made their One Day International (ODI) debut, with Abdul Rehman and Asghar Ali instead sharing the wicket-keeping duties. At the 2005 ICC Trophy in Ireland, Nadeem kept wickets in four of his team's seven matches, with Asghar Ali taking the role for the other three. After that tournament, Nadeem played only one further match for the UAE, on a 2007 tour of Canada.
