= Lyndsay Walker =

Australian cricketer

Personal information
- Full name: Lyndsay Nicholas Peter Walker
- Born: 22 June 1974 (age 52); Armidale, New South Wales, Australia
- Batting: Right-handed
- Role: Wicket-keeper

Domestic team information
- Years: Team
- 1994–1997: Nottinghamshire (England)
- Source: CricketArchive, 2 April 2016

Lyndsay Nicholas Peter Walker (born 22 June 1974) is a former Australian cricketer who represented Nottinghamshire in English county cricket. He played as a wicket-keeper.

Walker was born in Armidale, New South Wales. He left Australia in 1992 to play in England, qualifying for Nottinghamshire by residency. Walker made his first-class debut in July 1994, in a match against the touring South Africans. He made his County Championship debut in 1996, and his limited-overs debut shortly after, in the 1996 NatWest Trophy. In the 1997–98 off-season, Walker sustained a hand injury that ended his professional playing career, despite several operations to repair it. In total, he made twelve first-class and three List A appearances for Nottinghamshire. After the end of his playing career, Walker worked as a development coach with Nottinghamshire for several years. In 2000, he took up a coaching position with the Malaysian Cricket Association, going on to coach the Malaysian national team at the 2001 ICC Trophy in Canada.
