= Osborne Park, Belfast =

Cricket ground in Belfast, Northern Ireland

Osborne Park
- Location: Belfast, Northern Ireland
- Country: Ireland
- Coordinates: 54.5686°N 5.9512°W
- Establishment: 1912
- End names
- Osborne Park; Cranmore
- As of 17 July 2018; Source: Ground profile

Osborne Park is a cricket ground in Belfast, Northern Ireland.

== History ==
Established in 1912, Osborne Park is owned by the Royal Belfast Academical Institution and is used as their main sports field. The ground was selected to host two List A matches in the 2005 ICC Trophy, hosting Netherlands v Papua New Guinea, and three days later Namibia v Netherlands.

== Records ==
=== List A ===
- Highest team total: 189/4 by Netherlands v Namibia, 2005
- Lowest team total: 69 by Papua New Guinea v Netherlands, 2005
- Highest individual innings: 65* by Bas Zuiderent for Netherlands v Namibia, 2005
- Best bowling in an innings: 5-20 by Edgar Schiferli for Netherlands v Papua New Guinea, 2005

== See also ==
- List of cricket grounds in Ireland
