= Johan Malcolm =

Personal information
- Full name: Richard Johan Anders Malcolm-Hansen
- Born: 22 April 1986 (age 40); Farnborough, Greater London, England
- Batting: Right-handed
- Bowling: Right-arm off break

International information
- National side: Denmark

Domestic team information
- Years: Team
- 2008: Leicestershire
- 2007–2008: Loughborough UCCE
- 2005: Denmark

Career statistics
Competition	First-class	List A
Matches	6	14
Runs scored	283	157
Batting average	35.37	14.27
100s/50s	0/2	0/1
Top score	93	71
Balls bowled	240	422
Wickets	1	8
Bowling average	128.00	47.62
5 wickets in innings	0	0
10 wickets in match	0	0
Best bowling	1/40	3/38
Catches/stumpings	2/–	4/–
- Source: CricInfo, 10 February 2018

Richard Johan Anders Malcolm-Hansen (born 22 April 1986), known as Johan Malcolm, is an English-born Danish cricketer. He is a right-handed batsman and a right-arm offbreak bowler who has played domestic cricket for Denmark and first-class cricket for Loughborough University and Leicestershire County Cricket Club.

He first played for the Danish cricket team in the 2005 Cheltenham & Gloucester Trophy and continued playing for the side until 2007–08. He played for Kent Second XI between 2003 and 2007 in both the Second Eleven Championship and Second Eleven Trophy and plays in the Kent Cricket League for Beckenham Cricket Club. Malcolm played in Denmark's 2005 ICC Trophy campaign. During 2007 he made his first-class cricket debut, for Loughborough UCCE against Yorkshire before joining Leicestershire on an MCC sponsored internship for the 2008 season. He played four matches for the Leicestershire First XI, two in the County Championship and two in the 2008 Pro40 List A cricket competition. He left the county at the end of the 2008 season.
