= Sanjayan Thuraisingam =

Canadian cricketer (born 1969)

Personal information
- Born: 11 September 1969 (age 57); Colombo, Ceylon
- Batting: Right-handed
- Bowling: Right-arm fast medium

International information
- National side: Canada (2003-2008)
- ODI debut (cap 24): 11 February 2003 v Bangladesh
- Last ODI: 30 November 2006 v Bermuda
- T20I debut (cap 11): 2 August 2008 v Netherlands
- Last T20I: 5 August 2008 v Bermuda

Career statistics
Competition	ODI	First-class
Matches	9	2
Runs scored	38	9
Batting average	6.33	3.00
100s/50s	0/0	0/0
Top score	13	4
Balls bowled	361	156
Wickets	11	0
Bowling average	24.72	–
5 wickets in innings	0	–
10 wickets in match	0	–
Best bowling	4/35	–
Catches/stumpings	4/–	2/–
- Source: ESPNcricinfo, 28 April 2020

Sanjayan Thuraisingam (born 11 September 1969) is a Tamil Canadian cricketer. He is a right-handed batsman and a right-arm fast medium bowler.

Thuraisingam was Canada's top wicket-taker at the 2001 ICC Trophy and his 5 wickets for just 25 runs brought Canada's cricket team to the World Cup on 17 July 2001. He played three matches in the 2003 Cricket World Cup, and has since played a further six One Day Internationals for Canada. He has also represented them in two ICC Intercontinental Cup matches and the 2005 ICC Trophy.
