= David Cox (1960s cricketer) =

English cricketer

Personal information
- Full name: David William Cox
- Born: 19 May 1946 (age 80); Oakhill, Somerset, England
- Batting: Right-handed
- Bowling: Right-arm fast-medium

Domestic team information
- Years: Team
- 1969: Somerset

Career statistics
Competition	FC
Matches	1
Runs scored	8
Batting average	4.00
100s/50s	0/0
Top score	8
Balls bowled	114
Wickets	1
Bowling average	77.00
5 wickets in innings	0
10 wickets in match	0
Best bowling	1/50
Catches/stumpings	2/–
- Source: Cricinfo, 22 December 2015

David William Cox (born 19 May 1946) is a former English cricketer who played in one first-class match for Somerset in 1969.

Cox was a lower-order right-handed batsman and a right-arm fast-medium bowler. He played a few second eleven matches for the combined Somerset and Gloucestershire side in 1968. His only first-class game came the following year, 1969, when he played for Somerset against Hampshire at the United Services Ground, Portsmouth.
