= Jesper Hansen (cricketer) =

Danish cricketer

Personal information
- Full name: Jesper Hansen
- Born: 1 December 1980 (age 45); Esbjerg, Esbjerg Municipality, Denmark
- Batting: Right-handed

International information
- National side: Denmark

Career statistics
Competition	List A
Matches	5
Runs scored	34
Batting average	8.50
100s/50s	0/0
Top score	17
Catches/stumpings	1/–
- Source: Cricinfo, 15 January 2011

Jesper Hansen (born 1 December 1980) is a Danish cricketer. Hansen is a right-handed batsman. He was born at Esbjerg, Esbjerg Municipality.

== Career ==
Hansen first represented Denmark under-19s against the Netherlands under-19s in the 1997 International Youth Tournament, making six appearances in the tournament. He played for Denmark in the 1998 Under-19 Cricket World Cup, making his Youth One Day International (YODI) debut against Ireland under-19s. He made five further YODI appearances in the tournament, the last of which came against Namibia under-19s. The following year, he again represented Denmark under-19s, this time in the European Under-19 Championship. His senior debut for Denmark came in a minor match against the Netherlands in 2003. He made two further appearances for Denmark in that year, before making three appearances in the 2004 European Championship Division One.

The following year he was selected in Denmark's squad for the 2005 ICC Trophy in Ireland. The International Cricket Council afforded List A status to these matches, with Hansen making his List A debut during the tournament against Uganda. He made four further List A appearances in the tournament, the last of which came against the Netherlands. He scored 34 runs in his five matches, at an average of 8.50 and with a high score of 17. These were his only List A appearances for Denmark. His final appearance for Denmark came in 2006, in a friendly match against the Gloucestershire Second XI.
