= Naseer Shaukat =

Pakistani cricketer (born 1966)

Naseer Shaukat (born 24 January 1966) is a Pakistani former professional cricketer who played for The Hills Cricket Club, in Dublin, Ireland.
