= Cedric English =

Scottish cricketer (born 1973)

Personal information
- Born: 13 September 1973 (age 53); Kimberley, Northern Cape
- Batting: Right-handed
- Bowling: Right-arm fast-medium

Career statistics
Competition	First-class	List A
Matches	40	69
Runs scored	1,150	792
Batting average	20.90	15.84
100s/50s	1/5	0/3
Top score	108	75*
Balls bowled	4740	1,497
Wickets	67	30
Bowling average	39.97	44.36
5 wickets in innings	1	0
10 wickets in match	0	0
Best bowling	5/65	3/24
Catches/stumpings	14/–	17/–
- Source: Cricinfo

Cedric Vaughan English (born 13 September 1973) is a Scottish cricketer, originally from South Africa. An allrounder, he is a right-handed middle-order batsman and opening bowler.

English made his first-class debut when he was just 17, playing for Griqualand West in South African domestic cricket. He went on to play for Western Province and Boland before moving to Scotland in 1998 as a professional for club side Carlton

After qualifying for Scottish residence he became a member of their 2004 Intercontinental Cup side which won the competition. He was also part of Scotland's triumphant ICC Trophy side in 2005.
