= David Cox (1990s cricketer) =

English cricketer

David Mathew Cox
- Born: 2 March 1972

David Mathew Cox (born 2 March 1972) was an English cricketer who went to Greenford High School and played first-class cricket for Durham between 1994 and 1997. He was a left-handed batsman and a slow left-arm bowler. Cox was born in Southall, Middlesex. Now lives in West Sussex.

Cox's career started at Lords on the MCC young cricketers Staff, he was there for Five years from 1986 to 1991, where he then went on to the Second XI Championship, where he played his first game in 1990 for Worcestershire. He moved to Durham and was picked on a regular basis during the 1992 Second XI competition, and two years later, made his County Championship debut against Warwickshire – the same match in which Brian Lara made his world-record first-class innings of 501 not out.

Durham finished the 1995 County Championship second-bottom of the table, and while Cox made four half-centuries the following year, he began the following season suffering from a bad spate of form, and was quickly dropped from the team, Durham's County Championship form barely having improved during this time.

Cox bowled two individual five-wicket innings during his spell at the club, and took one ten-wicket match-haul, in a match against Warwickshire in August 1996.
