= Wendell White (cricketer) =

Bermudian cricketer (born 1964)

Personal information
- Full name: Wendale da Costa White
- Born: 23 November 1964 (age 61); Upper Carlton, Saint James, Barbados
- Batting: Left-handed
- Bowling: Left-arm medium-fast

International information
- National side: Bermuda

Domestic team information
- Years: Team
- 2000/01: Bermuda

Career statistics
Competition	First-class	List A
Matches	1	5
Runs scored	39	87
Batting average	19.50	17.40
100s/50s	–/–	–/–
Top score	27	30
Balls bowled	–	74
Wickets	–	–
Bowling average	–	–
5 wickets in innings	–	–
10 wickets in match	–	–
Best bowling	–	–
Catches/stumpings	1/–	1/–
- Source: CricketArchive, 13 October 2011

Wendell White (born 23 November 1964 in Barbados) is a Bermudian cricketer. He is a left-handed batsman and a left-arm medium-fast bowler. He has played one first-class match against the USA and five List A matches for Bermuda, including the 2005 ICC Trophy.
