= Albert Steede =

Bermudian cricketer (born 1968)

Personal information
- Full name: Albert Bertie Steede
- Born: 17 May 1968 (age 58); Bermuda
- Batting: Right-handed

International information
- National side: Bermuda

Career statistics
Competition	List A
Matches	19
Runs scored	301
Batting average	16.72
100s/50s	–/–
Top score	47
Balls bowled	–
Wickets	–
Bowling average	–
5 wickets in innings	–
10 wickets in match	–
Best bowling	–
Catches/stumpings	5/–
- Source: CricketArchive, 13 October 2011

Albert Bertie Steede (born 17 May 1968 in Bermuda) is a Bermudian cricketer. He is a right-handed batsman. He has played 19 List A matches for Bermuda, most as part of the Red Stripe Bowl. He has played for Bermuda in four ICC Trophy tournaments, including the 2005 tournament that saw Bermuda qualify for the World Cup for the first time. He has not played for them since that tournament however.
