= David Cox (Scottish cricketer) =

Scottish cricketer

Personal information
- Full name: David John Cox
- Born: 1 March 1973 (age 53); Coventry, Warwickshire, England
- Batting: Right-handed
- Bowling: Right-arm medium-fast

International information
- National side: Scotland (1999–2001)
- Source: CricketArchive, 2 February 2016

David John Cox (born 1 March 1973) is a former Scottish international cricketer who represented the Scottish national side between 1999 and 2001. He played as a right-arm pace bowler.

Cox began his club career in Scotland with the Aberdeen-based Aberdeenshire Cricket Club, but later switched to The Grange Club (based in Edinburgh). He made his debut for the national team in August 1999, playing a first-class match against a South Africa Academy team. The following year, he represented Scotland at the ICC Emerging Nations Challenge in Zimbabwe, although he took only a single wicket from four games. At the 2001 ICC Trophy in Canada, Cox played in three of Scotland's ten games, taking wickets against Singapore (1/19 from eight overs) and Canada (1/40 from eight overs). He made his final appearances for Scotland later in the year, playing C&G Trophy games against the Middlesex Cricket Board and Dorset.
