= Paul Hoffmann (cricketer) =

Australian cricketer (b. 1970)

Personal information
- Full name: Paul Jacob Christopher Hoffmann
- Born: 14 January 1970 (age 56); Rockhampton, Queensland, Australia
- Batting: Right-handed
- Bowling: Right-arm medium-fast
- Role: Bowler

Career statistics
Competition	ODI	FC	LA
Matches	18	9	97
Runs scored	85	93	540
Batting average	7.72	13.28	10.58
100s/50s	0/0	0/0	0/0
Top score	31	48	39
Balls bowled	743	1,458	4,350
Wickets	16	30	96
Bowling average	34.68	17.96	31.91
5 wickets in innings	0	2	1
10 wickets in match	0	0	0
Best bowling	3/22	5/5	6/12
Catches/stumpings	5/–	1/–	15/–
- Source: ESPNcricinfo, 29 June 2020

Paul Jacob Christopher Hoffmann (born 14 January 1970), is an Australian cricketer who has played for the cricket teams of Scotland. He is a right-handed batsman and right-arm medium-fast bowler.

== Early life ==
Hoffmann was born on 14 January 1970 in Rockhampton, Queensland, Australia.

== Career ==
As a youngster, Hoffmann competed as a woodchopper, following in his father's footsteps. However at the age of 12, while chopping barefoot, he slipped and removed the tip of his left big toe. Following this horrific event Paul never regained his technique and turned to cricket to fill the void.

After playing for the Australian Country team against the West Indies in 1993 and for Manly in Sydney, Hoffmann emigrated to Scotland in 1997, first playing for the Uddingston club as an overseas professional. He liked it so much that he stayed on and played as an amateur. Hoffmann is the leading wicket taker in the history of the Scottish National League, with 282 wickets.

Hoffmann qualified by residence to play for Scotland in 2001, making his début in a match against an England Amateur team on 14 August 2001, taking five wickets. He went on to play for Scotland on 119 occasions. This includes fifteen One Day Internationals, his first match of that type coming against Pakistan in June 2006. Taking 3 for 22 off his 10 overs, including Salman Butt and Younis Khan.

Hoffmann played for Scotland in their winning 2005 ICC Trophy campaign and was the top wicket-taker in the tournament with 17 wickets. This included taking 6 wickets for 12 runs against Oman, a record for Scotland in ICC Trophy competition. In the 2007 World Cricket League tournament in Kenya he bowled Scotland to victory over Netherlands with a heroic last over taking two wickets in three balls for 0 runs, with a run out accounting for the 2nd wicket of the three that fell in the over.

A hard-hitting batsman, Hoffmann holds the record for the fastest century in Scottish National League cricket history, smashing 100 off 35 balls for his club Uddingston in May 2005. He was an important member of the Scottish Saltires cricket team and was part of their squad for the Cricket World Cup in March 2007.

Hoffmann retired from international cricket in August 2007, returning typically miserly figures of 9 overs for 43 in his final game against India at Glasgow.
