= Mohammad Asif (Oman cricketer) =

Pakistani-born cricketer (born 1970)

Mohammad Asif (Urdu: محمد آصف; born 1 January 1970, Karachi) is a Pakistani-born cricketer who played for the Oman national cricket team. He is a right-handed batsman and right-arm offbreak bowler. He made several appearances as a batsman in the 2005 ICC Trophy and has also played List A cricket for the Oman national cricket team.
