= Drew Parsons (cricketer) =

Scottish cricketer (born 1975)

Robert Andrew "Drew" Parsons (born 26 July 1975 in Ayrshire, Scotland) is a Scottish cricketer. He is a left-handed batsman and a left-arm medium pace bowler. He has played two first-class and 14 List A matches for Scotland and has represented his country 52 times in all since making his debut against Durham in 1997. His last appearance for Scotland to date was at the 2001 ICC Trophy. In 2016, Parsons was working as a sales manager.
