= Mohammad Aslam (Oman cricketer) =

Pakistani-born cricketer (born 1975)

Mohammad Aslam (born 28 August 1975 in Karachi) is a Pakistani-born cricketer who played for the Oman national cricket team. He is a right-handed batsman and right-arm medium-fast bowler. He made several appearances as a batsman in the 2005 ICC Trophy. He is currently the coach of Al-Shaanzi Cricket Academy. He is also a member of the Raha Cricket Team in Oman Cricket League and is a well-known all-rounder. His highest score in the ICC Trophy was 58.
