= Don Maxwell =

Canadian cricketer (born 1971)

Cricket information
- Batting: Right-handed
- Bowling: Right-arm fast-medium

Career statistics
Competition	ODI
Matches	10
Runs scored	166
Batting average	27.66
100s/50s	0/1
Top score	59
Balls bowled	72
Wickets	1
Bowling average	70.00
5 wickets in innings	0
10 wickets in match	0
Best bowling	1/23
Catches/stumpings	0/–
- Source: CricInfo, 19 April 2007

Don Maxwell (born 23 February 1971) is a Canadian cricketer. He is a right-handed batsman, and a right arm fast-medium bowler. He was born at Bridgetown in Barbados.

Maxwell made his debut for Canada on 14 February 1994 against Namibia in the 1994 ICC Trophy. He has played in three ICC Trophy tournaments for Canada in all. Maxwell made his One Day International debut for Canada against Bermuda on 17 May 2006 in Trinidad and has played three ODIs in total. In addition to the ICC Trophy and ODIs, he has represented Canada in the 2004 ICC Americas Championship, six ICC Intercontinental Cup games and on two occasions in which Canada participated in West Indian domestic one-day cricket.
