= Subhash Modi =

Kenyan cricket umpire (born 1946)

Personal information
- Full name: Subhash Ranchoddas Modi
- Born: 30 March 1946 (age 80); Zanzibar

Umpiring information
- ODIs umpired: 22 (2001–2010)
- T20Is umpired: 9 (2007–2010)
- Source: Cricinfo, 16 October 2011

Subhash Ranchoddas Modi (born 30 March 1946) is a Kenyan umpire and former cricketer. Modi has served as the chairman, secretary and treasurer of Kenya Cricket Umpires and Scorers Association. The organisation awarded him life membership for his services. He also played for Kenya in 1969.

He has officiated in the Commonwealth Games in Malaysia; ICC Trophy; as fourth umpire in the 1999 World Cup as well as the Champions Trophy in 2000 in full ODIs.

Modi's son Hitesh Modi has captained the Kenyan national cricket team. The pair are unique as the only father/son pair to appear as Player and umpire in the same One-day International against Bangladesh at Nairobi in August 2006; father gave son out lbw.

== See also ==
- List of One Day International cricket umpires
- List of Twenty20 International cricket umpires
