= Billy Stelling =

Dutch cricketer (born 1969)

Personal information
- Full name: William Frederick Stelling
- Born: 30 June 1969 (age 57); Johannesburg, South Africa
- Batting: Right-handed
- Bowling: Right-arm fast-medium

International information
- National side: Netherlands (2006–2007)
- ODI debut (cap 29): 4 July 2006 v Sri Lanka
- Last ODI: 13 July 2007 v Scotland
- ODI shirt no.: 59

Career statistics
Competition	ODI	FC	LA
Matches	15	19	63
Runs scored	180	508	856
Batting average	30.00	18.81	34.24
100s/50s	0/0	0/1	0/3
Top score	44	53	76*
Balls bowled	567	2,419	2,806
Wickets	22	33	74
Bowling average	25.77	32.36	27.55
5 wickets in innings	0	1	1
10 wickets in match	0	0	0
Best bowling	3/12	5/49	5/30
Catches/stumpings	7/–	8/–	25/–
- Source: Cricinfo, 23 October 2017

William Frederick Stelling (born 30 June 1969), better known as Billy Stelling, is a South African-born Dutch former cricketer who played fifteen ODIs. An allrounder born at Johannesburg, he bowled right arm fast medium and batted right-handed.

Aside from cricket he is also an accomplished mountainbiker, taking part in over 50 mountain bike stage races. In 2016 he and partner Lourens Luus won the Trans Baviaans ultra marathon race of 231 km.

He has also finished 2nd and 4th in his age group at South African Marathon championships in 2012 and 2021 respectively and earned Western Province cycling colours.

== Domestic career ==
He has been a much-traveled player, starting his career at Western Province in his native South Africa, before moving on to play for Boland. Three seasons were then spent in English county cricket from 1999 to 2001, where he played for Berkshire and Leicestershire.

== International career ==
Stelling first played for The Netherlands in 1995 as an overseas player in the Nat West Trophy. He qualified to represent his adopted country in international competition in 2005, playing in the ICC Trophy that year. In an ODI against Canada in December 2006 he scored a match winning 34-ball 39 in a thrilling runchase.

At the 2007 Cricket World Cup, he took 3 of the first 4 wickets to fall against Scotland, finishing with 3 for 12 off 8 overs and the man of the match award.

== Beyond cricket ==
In 2016, Stelling won the Trans Baviaans 230 km endurance MTB Race with his teammate Lourens Luus.
