= Ahmed Nadeem =

United Arab Emirati cricketer (born 1976)

Personal information
- Born: 26 October 1976 (age 50); Abu Dhabi, United Arab Emirates
- Batting: Right-handed
- Bowling: Right-arm medium pace
- Role: Bowler

Career statistics
| Competition | FC | LA | ICC T |
|---|---|---|---|
| Matches | 7 | 8 | 24 |
| Runs scored | 143 | 71 | 425 |
| Batting average | 14.30 | 14.20 | 28.33 |
| 100s/50s | 0/0 | 0/0 | 0/3 |
| Top score | 34 | 24 | 67 |
| Balls bowled | 870 | 336 | 1175 |
| Wickets | 17 | 12 | 32 |
| Bowling average | 23.52 | 22.33 | 22.09 |
| 5 wickets in innings | 1 | 1 | 1 |
| 10 wickets in match | 0 | 0 | 0 |
| Best bowling | 5/84 | 5/32 | 5/32 |
| Catches/stumpings | 3/– | 2/– | 5/– |
- Source: CricketArchive, 5 September 2008

Ahmed Nadeem (born 26 October 1976) is a United Arab Emirati cricketer. A right-handed batsman and right-arm medium pace bowler, he has played for the United Arab Emirates national cricket team since 1997, including seven first-class and eight List A matches. He has represented his country in three ICC Trophy tournaments and three ACC Trophy tournaments.

== Cricket career ==
Born in Abu Dhabi in 1976, Ahmed Nadeem first played for the UAE at the 1997 ICC Trophy in Kuala Lumpur, his first match being against West Africa. It would be three years before he next played for them – the 2000 ACC Trophy in the UAE. He also played in that tournament in 2002 and 2004.

In 2001, he played in the 2001 ICC Trophy in Ontario and in the Hong Kong Cricket Sixes, a tournament he also played in the following year. In 2003, he played for an Emirates Cricket Board team in four matches against Pakistan A, and made his first-class and List A debut in 2004. His first-class debut was against Malaysia in the Intercontinental Cup and his List A debut was against Canada in the ICC 6 Nations Challenge.

He played for the UAE in the 2005 ICC Trophy in Ireland, also playing three matches against England A, matches in the 2005 Intercontinental Cup against Hong Kong and Nepal and an ACC Fast Track Countries Tournament match against Hong Kong.

After being absent from the team in 2006, he played for them in 2007, playing four Intercontinental Cup matches, including two against Scotland. He also played an ACC Premier League match against Malaysia and against a Scotland XI and twice against a Canadian Invitation XI, which was his last appearance for his country to date.

=== Cricket statistics ===
In his seven first-class matches, Ahmed Nadeem has scored 143 runs at an average of 14.30 with a top score of 34 for the UAE against Hong Kong. He has taken 17 wickets at an average of 23.52 with best innings bowling figures of 5/84 for the UAE against Scotland. In List A cricket he has scored 71 runs at an average of 14.20 with a top score of 24 for the UAE against the USA and taken twelve wickets at an average of 22.33 with best innings bowling figures of 5/32 also for the UAE, against the USA.
