= Fraser Watts =

Scotland international cricketer

Personal information
- Full name: David Fraser Watts
- Born: 5 June 1979 (age 47); King's Lynn, Norfolk, England
- Batting: Right-handed
- Bowling: Right-arm medium
- Role: Batsman

International information
- National side: Scotland
- ODI debut (cap 26): 6 August 2006 v Netherlands
- Last ODI: 28 August 2009 v Australia
- ODI shirt no.: 12

Career statistics
Competition	ODI	T20I	FC	LA
Matches	36	11	21	137
Runs scored	974	137	942	2,732
Batting average	28.64	15.22	28.54	22.39
100s/50s	1/9	0/0	2/4	1/15
Top score	101	46	146	101
Catches/stumpings	7/–	6/–	13/–	26/–
- Source: CricketArchive, 10 December 2022

Fraser Watts (born 5 June 1979) is a Scottish cricketer. He is a right-handed batsman. He began his cricket career playing for Carlton Cricket Club in Edinburgh. He demonstrated significant potential early on and when aged 16 won a sports scholarship to Durham School where he completed the last 2 years of his education. Watts has returned to play for Carlton, following a stint at Greenock, in the SNCL and also enjoyed a stint as the opening batsman for the Scottish national team. He was part of the Scottish team that travelled to the West Indies for the Cricket World Cup in 2007. He played in two of their group games but had to pull out of their final game at the last minute due to a groin strain on the morning of the match.

He was educated at South Morningside Primary, Boroughmuir High School, Durham School and then Loughborough University.

As a batsman, Watts is renowned for his flowing locks and cover drives. Formerly a seam bowler, he once removed Dan Marsh twice during a six wicket haul against Leicestershire CCC whilst playing for Loughborough University; however he has since failed to get a bowl for any of his club sides in Scotland.

Watts was voted 24th most eligible bachelor in Scotland in a Scotland on Sunday special feature in 2006.

In 2013, Fraser announced his retirement from International Cricket. Since his retirement from international cricket, Fraser has continued to turn out at club level for Carlton Cricket Club.

Apart from cricket he enjoys many other sports, including golf and football.
