= 2007 Cricket World Cup qualification =

The 2007 Cricket World Cup was contested between 16 of the 97 countries that were members of the International Cricket Council at the time. The 11 teams with One-Day International status at the time of drafting qualified automatically for the World Cup. Meanwhile, the 86 other members of the ICC played off in a series of tournaments, forming the Cricket World Cup qualification process, to capture one of the remaining five spots in the World Cup.

== European Cricket Council Trophy 2003 ==
Held in Austria in August 2003, the European Cricket Council Trophy 2003 was contested by 11 teams across 3 preliminary groups. The top four teams from these groups progressed through to a championship group, where each team played each other once.

Group Stages:

Group 1
Team	Pts	Pld	W	L
Malta	4	2	2	0
Finland	2	2	1	1
Portugal	0	2	0	2

Group 2
Team	Pts	Pld	W	L
Greece	6	3	3	0
Austria	4	3	2	1
Switzerland	2	3	1	2
Luxembourg	0	3	0	3

Group 3
Team	Pts	Pld	W	L
Norway	6	3	3	0
Spain	4	3	2	1
Belgium	2	3	1	2
Croatia	0	3	0	3

Group Standings: Norway, Greece, Malta and Austria progressed to the Championship Group.

Championship Group
Team	Pts	Pld	W	L
Norway	6	3	3	0
Austria	2	3	1	2
Malta	2	3	1	2
Greece	2	3	1	2

Final Standings: Norway qualified to participate in European Championships 2nd Division 2004, after finishing on top of the championship group.

== Affiliates Tournaments ==
=== ICC WCQS Tournament - Africa Affiliates ===
Held in Africa during March 2004, 8 teams (from 7 countries and a South Africa Country Districts team) played off in two groups of four. After each team has played one game against the other three teams in their pool, the top two teams advanced to the next round. The two top teams in each group progressed, playing semi-finals, a third-place play-off and a final, where South Africa Country Districts defeated Botswana.

Final Standings:

In bold: Advanced to the ICC Six Nations WCQS Tournament

Botswana qualified to participate in the ICC Six Nations WCQS Tournament, after being the country with the highest standing at the end of the tournament

In italics: Won tournament but was not eligible to advance to next the stage

South Africa Country Districts were undefeated throughout the tournament, but because they were not a country, were not eligible to advance to the ICC Six Nations WCQS Tournament

Group 1
Team	Pts	Pld	W	L
Botswana	**6**	3	3	0
Malawi	**4**	3	2	1
Sierra Leone	**2**	3	1	2
Gambia	**0**	3	0	3

Group 2
Team	Pts	Pld	W	L
(South Africa) SACD	**6**	3	3	0
Ghana	**4**	3	2	1
Mozambique	**2**	3	1	2
Rwanda	**0**	3	0	3

Final Points Table
Team	Pts	Pld	W	L
(South Africa) SACD	**10**	5	5	0
**Botswana**	**8**	5	4	1
Ghana	**6**	5	3	2
Malawi	**4**	5	2	3

=== Americas Affiliates Championship 2004 ===
Similarly to the African Affiliates playoff, the Americas Affiliates Championship was contested in March 2004 to decide the team that would progress through to the next round. Five ICC Affiliate members played off in a round-robin format from 23 March to 27 March, playing each other once.

Team	Pts	Pld	W	L	NR	NRR
**Bahamas**	**24**	4	4	0	0	2.368
Panama	**18**	4	3	1	0	0.898
Belize	**12**	4	2	2	0	1.159
Turks and Caicos Islands	**6**	4	1	3	0	-1.998
Suriname	**0**	4	0	4	0	-2.208

=== European Championships 2nd Division 2004 ===
Competed in Belgium in 2004 and separate to the 1st Division Championships for the first time, six countries played off on four grounds in Antwerp, Brussels and Mechelen. Italy went through unbeaten, qualifying for a play off at the ICC World Cup Qualifying Series Division 2 for the twelfth and final place for the 2005 ICC Trophy.

Team	Pts	Pld	W	T	NR	L	Qualification
**Italy**	10	5	5	0	0	0	World Cup Qualifying Series Division 2 2005
France	6	5	3	0	0	2	
Germany	6	5	3	0	0	2	
Norway	4	5	2	0	0	3	
Gibraltar	4	5	2	0	0	3	
Israel	0	5	0	0	0	5	

== Final Regional Qualifying Events ==
=== Asian Cricket Council Trophy ===
Hosted in Malaysia in June 2004, the ACC Trophy was contested by 15 countries divided into four groups. The tournament then progressed into a knockout phase, with the top two teams from each group progressing to the quarter finals. At the end of the tournament, the runner-up Oman and the winner United Arab Emirates secured themselves a spot in the ICC Trophy.

Kuwait, Qatar and Nepal finished third, fourth and fifth, and play in the World Cup Qualifying Series Division 2 2005.

=== ICC Six Nations WCQS Tournament ===
Both Namibia and Uganda qualified for the ICC Trophy after they finished ahead of the other four teams in a round robin tournament played in Zambia in August 2004.

Team	Pts	Pld	W	L	RRF	RRA	NRR	Qualification
Namibia	25	5	5	0	5.11	2.31	2.80	2005 ICC Trophy
Uganda	20	5	4	1	3.77	2.99	0.78	2005 ICC Trophy
Zambia	10	5	2	3	3.58	3.98	-0.40	World Cup Qualifying Series Division 2 2005
Botswana	10	5	2	3	4.24	4.59	-0.35	
Nigeria	5	5	1	4	3.34	4.91	-1.57	
Tanzania	5	5	1	4	3.01	5.08	-2.07	

=== European Championships 2004 ===
Even though the tournament isn't considered to be a qualification tournament, the European Championship is considered to be the most important European tournament on the calendar. Contested by Denmark, Holland, Ireland, Scotland as well as an ECB England XI, the format is a round robin tournament, with the winner being the team that finishes on top. Denmark, Holland, Ireland and Scotland were already guaranteed a direct spot into the ICC Trophy, with the ECB XI being ineligible.

Team	Pts	Pld	W	T	NR	L	Qualification
ECB England XI	8	4	4	0	0	0	
Ireland	6	4	3	0	0	1	2005 ICC Trophy
Netherlands	4	4	2	0	0	2	2005 ICC Trophy
Scotland	2	4	1	0	0	3	2005 ICC Trophy
Denmark	0	4	0	0	0	4	2005 ICC Trophy

=== Americas Cricket Championship ===
Bermuda hosted the 2004 Americas Cricket Championship in July 2004, which was played as a round robin tournament with the top three out of the six teams progressing through to the ICC Trophy.

Team	Pts	Pld	W	L	NR	NRR	Qualification
Canada	20	5	5	0	0	2.157	2005 ICC Trophy
United States	16	5	4	1	0	2.132	2005 ICC Trophy
Bermuda	12	5	3	2	0	0.944	2005 ICC Trophy
Cayman Islands	8	5	2	3	0	-0.198	World Cup Qualifying Series Division 2 2005
Argentina	4	5	1	4	0	-2.007	
Bahamas	0	5	0	5	0	-2.226	

=== ICC East Asia-Pacific Cricket Challenge 2004 ===
Japan hosted the tournament from May 25 to May 29, 2004, with teams from Fiji, Indonesia, Japan and Tonga contesting in a round robin format, with the top two ranked teams, Fiji and Tonga, playing in a final to decide the tournament winner. Fiji beat Tonga in the final by 181 runs, hence qualifying to the ICC World Cup Qualifying Series Division 2.

Team	Pld	W	L	Qualification
Fiji	3	3	0	World Cup Qualifying Series Division 2 2005
Tonga	3	2	1	
Indonesia	3	1	2	
Japan	3	0	3	

== World Cup Qualifying Series Division 2 2005 ==
This new event for the eight teams that had narrowly missed out on direct qualification for the ICC Trophy was played in Malaysia in February 2005. Two groups of four teams each played each other in a round robin stage, with the top two teams from each group progressing to a knockout stage, where the winners would progress to a final. Papua New Guinea emerged winners in Kuala Lumpur on 26 February, beating Fiji by 30 runs. Papua New Guinea therefore managed to grab the final spot into the ICC Trophy.

Group A

Team	Pts	Pld	W	T	L
Papua New Guinea	6	3	3	0	0
Nepal	4	3	2	0	1
Kuwait	2	3	1	0	2
Italy	0	3	0	0	3

Group B

Team	Pts	Pld	W	T	L
Fiji	6	3	3	0	0
Qatar	4	3	2	0	1
Cayman Islands	2	3	1	0	2
Zambia	0	3	0	0	3

Semi-finals
25 February - Selangor Turf Club
Papua New Guinea	9/260
Qatar	10/224
25 February - Bayumas Oval
Fiji	8/143
Nepal	10/140

Final
27 February - Royal Selangor Club
Papua New Guinea	10/176
Fiji	10/146
Third place
27 February - Bayumas Oval
Nepal	7/176
Qatar	10/78

== 2005 ICC Trophy ==
The 2005 ICC Trophy was a cricket tournament held in Ireland between 1 July and 13 July. It was an international one-day tournament played over 50 overs per side between 12 associate members of the International Cricket Council. It came with the prize of a place in the 2007 Cricket World Cup (and together with it a share of US$2,500,000 for future development) for the five top-ranked teams, and with the prize of official One Day International status from 1 January 2006 (until the 2009 ICC Trophy) for the five top-ranked teams along with Kenya, who had already been given official one-day status till the 2009 Trophy.

On 7 July, Ireland, Bermuda, Scotland and Canada qualified for the semi-finals. With that, they also won places in the 2007 Cricket World Cup and, from 1 January 2006, official One Day International status. On 11 July, the Netherlands also achieved this by beating the UAE to finish fifth. Scotland won the tournament, beating Ireland in the final.
