= 2001 ICC Trophy =

Cricket tournament in Canada

- Dates: 28 June – 17 July 2001
- Administrator: International Cricket Council
- Cricket format: Limited overs cricket
- Tournament format(s): Round-robin and Knockout
- Host: Canada
- Champions: Netherlands (1st title)
- Runners-up: Namibia
- Participants: 24
- Player of the series: (Netherlands) Roland Lefebvre
- Most runs: (Namibia) Daniel Keulder (366)
- Most wickets: (Netherlands) Roland Lefebvre (20) (Denmark) Soren Vestergaard (20)

The 2001 ICC Trophy was a cricket tournament played in Ontario, Canada in 2001. It was the Cricket World Cup qualification tournament for the 2003 Cricket World Cup. Three spots in the World Cup were on offer and the Netherlands, host nation Canada and for the first time, Namibia qualified. Scotland failed to qualify after losing in the 3rd place play-off and finishing fourth. The Netherlands won the final against Namibia. As a result of the final, the Netherlands qualified for the 2002 ICC Champions Trophy.

By then, Bangladesh had been promoted to full Test and ODI status and did not take part in this competition. Kenya had also gained full ODI status, so both countries qualified for the 2003 Cricket World Cup automatically.

== Group stage ==
The first round group stage saw a unique two division format, designed to eliminate the mismatches that had blighted previous ICC Trophy tournaments. Each division had two groups of six teams, making 24 teams in total.

However, Italy withdrew before the tournament started to protest Joe Scuderi being ruled ineligible despite being an Italian citizen. West Africa also withdrew, leaving one of the Division Two groups with just four teams, after Canadian immigration officials refused the West African team entry into the country due to concerns the players, especially from Sierra Leone, would stay in Canada illegally after the tournament.

The top three teams from the first round Division One groups went through to the Super League stage, whilst the fourth-placed team in each group played off against the winners of the Division Two groups.

=== Division One ===
==== Group A ====
Pos	Team	Pld	W	L	Pts	NRR	Qualification
1	Netherlands	5	5	0	10	1.374	Advanced to Super League
2	Scotland	5	4	1	8	1.030	Advanced to Super League
3	Canada (H)	5	3	2	6	0.724	Advanced to Super League
4	United Arab Emirates	5	2	3	4	−0.294	Advanced to Super League Play-offs
5	Fiji	5	1	4	2	−1.362	
6	Singapore	5	0	5	0	−1.851	

Source: ESPNcricinfo
(H) Host

==== Group B ====
Pos	Team	Pld	W	L	Pts	NRR	Qualification
1	Denmark	5	4	1	8	1.636	Advanced to Super League
2	United States	5	3	2	6	0.187	Advanced to Super League
3	Ireland	5	3	2	6	0.531	Advanced to Super League
4	Bermuda	5	3	2	6	0.026	Advanced to Super League Play-offs
5	Hong Kong	5	1	4	2	−1.057	
6	Papua New Guinea	5	1	4	2	−1.494	

Source: ESPNcricinfo

=== Division Two ===
==== Group A ====
Pos	Team	Pld	W	L	Pts	NRR	Qualification
1	Namibia	3	3	0	6	3.152	Advanced to Super League Play-offs
2	Nepal	3	2	1	4	−0.382	
3	Germany	3	1	2	2	−0.772	
4	Gibraltar	3	0	3	0	−1.632	
5	Italy	0	0	0	0	0.000	Withdrawn from tournament
6	West Africa	0	0	0	0	0.000	Withdrawn from tournament

Source: ESPNcricinfo

==== Group B ====
Pos	Team	Pld	W	L	Pts	NRR	Qualification
1	Uganda	5	5	0	10	1.969	Advanced to Super League Play-offs
2	Argentina	5	4	1	8	−0.640	
3	Malaysia	5	3	2	6	0.862	
4	East and Central Africa	5	2	3	4	0.473	
5	France	5	1	4	2	−1.516	
6	Israel	5	0	5	0	−1.006	

Source: ESPNcricinfo

== Super League Playoffs ==
7 July
Scorecard

Namibia; 221 (49.1 overs)	v	Bermuda; 146 (45.4 overs)

Namibia won by 75 runs
Maple Leaf South-East Ground, Toronto
Umpires: CJ Pickket(Ned), John Thallon (Sco)

- Bermuda won the toss and elected to field.
- Namibia qualified for the Super League stage as a result of this match

7 July
Scorecard

Uganda; 154 (46.3 overs)	v	United Arab Emirates; 155/5 (41.5 overs)

UAE won by 5 wickets
Maple Leaf North-East Ground, Toronto
Umpires: Johan Luther (Den), Paddy O'Hara (Ire)

- Uganda won the toss and elected to bat.
- United Arab Emirates qualified for the Super League stage as a result of this match

== Super League ==
Pos	Team	Pld	W	L	PCF	Pts	NRR
1	Netherlands	4	3	1	6	12	0.015
2	Namibia	4	4	0	2	10	0.735
3	Scotland	4	3	1	4	10	0.367
4	Canada (H)	4	2	2	2	6	0.617
5	United Arab Emirates	4	3	1	0	6	0.322
6	Denmark	4	0	4	4	4	−0.712
7	United States	4	0	4	4	4	−1.154
8	Ireland	4	1	3	2	4	−0.167

Source: ESPNcricinfo
(H) Host

Advanced to 2003 Cricket World Cup
Advanced to the 2003 Cricket World Cup Qualification match

9 July
Scorecard

Canada; 189 (48 overs)	v	Namibia; 190/8 (49.3 overs)

Namibia won by 2 wickets
Toronto Cricket, Skating and Curling Club
Player of the match: Melt van Schoor (Nam)

9 July
Scorecard

Netherlands; 174 (48.5 overs)	v	Denmark; 133 (45.4 overs)

Netherlands won by 41 runs
Ajax Cricket Club, Toronto
Player of the match: Roland Lefebvre (Ned)

9 July
Scorecard

Ireland; 174/8 (50 overs)	v	Scotland; 175/3 (42 overs)

Scotland won by 7 wickets
Malton Cricket Club, Toronto
Player of the match: Colin Smith (Sco)

9 July
Scorecard

United States; 153/8 (50 overs)	v	UAE; 155/3 (37.1 overs)

UAE won by 7 wickets
Maple Leaf Cricket Club, King City
Player of the match: Ahmed Nadeem (UAE)

10 July
Scorecard

Canada; 161 (47 overs)	v	Denmark; 136 (47.4 overs)

Canada won by 25 runs
Maple Leaf Cricket Club, King City
Player of the match: John Davison (Can)

10 July
Scorecard

Ireland; 283/7 (50 overs)	v	UAE; 285/6 (46.4 overs)

UAE won by 5 wickets
Toronto Cricket, Skating and Curling Club
Player of the match: Arshad Ali (UAE)

10 July
Scorecard

Namibia; 181/8 (50 overs)	v	Netherlands; 108 (44 overs)

Namibia won by 73 runs
G. Ross Lord Park, Toronto
Player of the match: Deon Kotze (Nam)

10 July
Scorecard

United States; 159 (47.5 overs)	v	Scotland; 161/5 (45.5 overs)

Scotland won by 5 wickets
G. Ross Lord Park, Toronto
Player of the match: Keith Sheridan (Sco)

12 July
Scorecard

Canada; 265 (50 overs)	v	USA; 144 (38.4 overs)

Canada won by 121 runs
Toronto Cricket, Skating and Curling Club
Player of the match: Joseph Harris (Can)

12 July
Scorecard

Scotland; 194/9 (50 overs)	v	Denmark; 165 (46.5 overs)

Scotland won by 29 runs
Malton Cricket Club, Toronto
Player of the match: Gregor Maiden (Sco)

12 July
Scorecard

Netherlands; 217 (48.2 overs)	v	Ireland; 215 (49.5 overs)

Netherlands won by 2 runs
Maple Leaf Cricket Club, King City
Player of the match: Kyle McCallan (Ire)

12 July
Scorecard

Namibia; 179/7 (50 overs)	v	UAE; 117 (34.3 overs)

Namibia won by 62 runs
Ajax Cricket Club, Toronto
Player of the match: Louis Burger (Nam)

13 July
Scorecard

Canada; 217 (49.5 overs)	v	Ireland; 218/3 (44.4 overs)

Ireland won by 7 wickets
G. Ross Lord Park, Toronto
Player of the match: Peter Davy (Ire)

13 July
Scorecard

Denmark; 167 (47.5 overs)	v	UAE; 168/5 (37.3 overs)

UAE won by 5 wickets
G. Ross Lord Park, Toronto
Player of the match: Arshad Ali (UAE)

13 July
Scorecard

Namibia; 256/6 (50 overs)	v	Scotland; 247 (48.4 overs)

Namibia won by 9 runs
Toronto Cricket, Skating and Curling Club
Player of the match: Burton van Rooi (Nam)

13 July
Scorecard

Netherlands; 203/8 (50 overs)	v	United States; 170 (47.5 overs)

Netherlands won by 33 runs
Toronto Cricket, Skating and Curling Club
Player of the match: Sebastiaan Gokke (Ned)

== Knockout Stage ==
=== 3rd-place play-off ===
17 July
Scorecard

Scotland; 176/9 (50 overs)	v	Canada; 177/5 (39.5 overs)
Drew Parsons 48 (96); Sanjayan Thuraisingam 5/25 (8 overs)		Ishwar Maraj 50 (77); John Blain 2/34 (8 overs)

Canada won by 5 wickets
Toronto Cricket, Skating and Curling Club
Player of the match: Sanjayan Thuraisingam (Can)

- Scotland won the toss and elected to bat.
- Canada qualified for the 2003 World Cup as a result of this match as the fourteenth team in that tournament.

=== Final ===
15 July
Scorecard

Namibia; 195/9 (50 overs)	v	Netherlands; 196/8 (50 overs)
Gavin Murgatroyd 50 (68); Tim de Leede 3/47 (10 overs)		Jacob-Jan Esmeijer 58* (51); Rudi van Vuuren 3/35 (10 overs)

Netherlands won by 2 wickets
Toronto Cricket, Skating and Curling Club
Player of the match: Jacob-Jan Esmeijer (Ned)

- Namibia won the toss and elected to bat.
- Netherlands won the 2001 ICC Trophy and qualified for the 2002 ICC Champions Trophy.

== Statistics ==
=== Most runs ===
The top five run scorers (total runs) are included in this table.

Player	Team	Runs	Inns	Avg	Highest	100s	50s
Daniel Keulder	Namibia	366	9	45.75	104	1	3
Ed Joyce	Ireland	359	8	71.80	87	0	4
Joseph Harris	Canada	329	9	41.12	79	0	3
Colin Smith	Scotland	326	9	46.57	88	0	3
Ahmed Nadeem	United Arab Emirates	318	10	45.42	67	0	3

Source: ESPNcricinfo

=== Most wickets ===
The top five wicket takers are listed in this table, listed by wickets taken and then by bowling average.

Player	Team	Overs	Wkts	Ave	SR	Econ	Best
Roland Lefebvre	Netherlands	72.3	20	11.05	21.75	3.04	5/16
Søren Vestergaard	Denmark	66.5	20	11.55	20.05	3.45	3/11
Burton van Rooi	Namibia	57.4	19	11.31	18.21	3.72	6/43
Khurram Khan	United Arab Emirates	95.0	19	13.52	30.00	2.70	4/18
Sanjayan Thuraisingam	Canada	79.1	19	15.00	25.00	3.60	5/25

Source: ESPNcricinfo

== See also ==
- ICC Trophy
- 2003 Cricket World Cup
