= 2023 Men's T20 World Cup Americas regional final =

Cricket qualification tournament

2023 ICC Men's T20 World Cup Americas regional final
- Dates: 30 September – 7 October 2023
- Administrator(s): International Cricket Council; ICC Americas
- Cricket format: Twenty20 International
- Tournament format: Double round-robin
- Host: Bermuda
- Champions: Canada
- Runners-up: Bermuda
- Participants: 4
- Matches: 12
- Player of the series: (Bermuda) Kamau Leverock
- Most runs: (Bermuda) Kamau Leverock (213)
- Most wickets: (Canada) Kaleem Sana (15)

The 2024 ICC Men's T20 World Cup was the ninth edition of the ICC Men's T20 World Cup, a biennial world cup for cricket in Twenty20 International (T20I) format, organized by the International Cricket Council (ICC). The qualification process for the world cup included two stages: direct qualification and regional qualification. The regional qualification for Americas was held in two stages: sub-regional qualifier and regional final.

The Americas region's regional final was hosted by Bermuda Cricket Board from 30 September to 7 October 2023. Canada qualified for the T20 World Cup after finishing atop the points table. Bermuda's Kamau Leverock was named player of the series having scored the most runs (213) while Canada's Kaleem Sana took the most wickets (15) in the tournament.

== Teams and qualification ==
A total of 5 teams participated in the sub-regional phase. The top three sides of the sub-regional qualifier advanced to the regional final, where they joined Canada who received a bye due to their participation in the 2022 global qualifiers.

Method of qualification	Date	Venue(s)	No. of teams	Team
2022 global qualifier A	24 February 2022	Oman	1	Canada
Sub-regional qualifier	25 February – 4 March 2023	Argentina	3	Bermuda
Sub-regional qualifier	25 February – 4 March 2023	Argentina	3	Cayman Islands
Sub-regional qualifier	25 February – 4 March 2023	Argentina	3	Panama
Total			4	

== Squads ==
Bermuda	Canada	Cayman Islands	Panama
Delray Rawlins (c); Derrick Brangman; Zeko Burgess; Allan Douglas; Terryn Fray (wk); Kamau Leverock; Tre Manders; Cejay Outerbridge; Alje Richardson; Jarryd Richardson (wk); Dominic Sabir; Sinclair Smith (wk); Charles Trott; Macquille Walker	Saad Bin Zafar (c); Shahid Ahmadzai; Dilpreet Bajwa; Navneet Dhaliwal; Nikhil Dutta; Jeremy Gordon; Dillon Heyliger; Aaron Johnson; Nicholas Kirton; Shreyas Movva (wk); Kaleem Sana; Gurpal Sidhu; Pargat Singh; Harsh Thaker; Srimantha Wijeratne (wk)	Ramon Sealy (c); Paul Manning (vc); Christopher Balraj; Kevon Bazil; Paul Chin (wk); Brian Corbin; Sacha De Alwis; Romeo Dunka; Patrick Heron; Alistair Ifill; Mohan Manivannan; Alessandro Morris; Akshay Naidoo; Troy Taylor; Conroy Wright	Laxman Gaonkar (c, wk); Anilkumar Natubhai Ahir (vc, wk); Jay Ahir; Khengar Bhai Ahir; Nikunj Ahir; Rahul Ahir; Sohilkumar Ahir; Ibrahim Bhana; Abdulla Bhoola; Mahmad Data; Yusuf Ebrahim; Abdullah Jasat; Mahmud Jasat; Faizan Patel; Mohmad Sohel Patel

== Points table ==
Pos	Team	Pld	W	L	NR	Pts	NRR	Qualification
1	Canada	6	4	1	1	9	3.980	Qualified for the 2024 Men's T20 World Cup
2	Bermuda	6	4	1	1	9	2.410	
3	Cayman Islands	6	1	3	2	4	−3.748	
4	Panama	6	0	4	2	2	−4.561	

Source: ESPNcricinfo

== Fixtures ==
30 September 2023
09:30
Scorecard

Bermuda; 181/9 (20 overs)	v	Canada; 95 (17 overs)
Kamau Leverock 83 (43); Kaleem Sana 4/23 (4 overs)		Nikhil Dutta 27 (16); Cejay Outerbridge 3/18 (4 overs)

Bermuda won by 86 runs
White Hill Field, Sandys Parish
Umpires: Jermaine Lindo (USA) and Jacqueline Williams (WI)
Player of the match: Kamau Leverock (Ber)

- Canada won the toss and elected to field.
- Cejay Outerbridge, Charles Trott (Ber) and Dilpreet Bajwa (Can) all made their T20I debuts.

30 September 2023
14:00
Scorecard

Panama; 85/8 (20 overs)	v	Cayman Islands; 88/3 (14.3 overs)
Mahmud Jasat 17 (25); Alessandro Morris 3/14 (4 overs)		Patrick Heron 31* (39); Abdullah Jasat 1/11 (2 overs)

Cayman Islands won by 7 wickets
White Hill Field, Sandys Parish
Umpires: Emmerson Carrington (Ber) and Vijaya Mallela (USA)
Player of the match: Alessandro Morris (Cay)

- Panama won the toss and elected to bat.
- Romeo Dunka, Akshay Naidoo (Cay), Jay Ahir and Laxman Gaonkar (Pan) all made their T20I debuts.

1 October 2023
09:30
Scorecard

Panama; 90/8 (20 overs)	v	Bermuda; 91/3 (13.5 overs)
Nikunj Ahir 23 (27); Derrick Brangman 3/11 (4 overs)		Tre Manders 55* (37); Nikunj Ahir 1/9 (1 over)

Bermuda won by 7 wickets
White Hill Field, Sandys Parish
Umpires: Emmerson Carrington (Ber) and Vijaya Mallela (USA)
Player of the match: Tre Manders (Ber)

- Panama won the toss and elected to bat.
- Abdulla Bhoola (Pan) made his T20I debut.

1 October 2023
14:00
Scorecard

Canada; 194/6 (20 overs)	v	Cayman Islands; 86 (17.1 overs)
Aaron Johnson 47 (19); Alessandro Morris 3/45 (4 overs)		Brian Corbin 34 (16); Nikhil Dutta 4/12 (4 overs)

Canada won by 108 runs
White Hill Field, Sandys Parish
Umpires: Jermaine Lindo (USA) and Jacqueline Williams (WI)
Player of the match: Harsh Thaker (Can)

- Canada won the toss and elected to bat.

3 October 2023
09:30
Scorecard

Canada; 230/4 (20 overs)	v	Panama; 67 (17.5 overs)
Aaron Johnson 121* (59); Anilkumar Natubhai Ahir 1/31 (4 overs)		Anilkumar Natubhai Ahir 24 (22); Harsh Thaker 3/13 (3.5 overs)

Canada won by 163 runs
Bermuda National Stadium, Hamilton
Umpires: Emmerson Carrington (Ber) and Jermaine Lindo (USA)
Player of the match: Aaron Johnson (Can)

- Canada won the toss and elected to bat.
- Ibrahim Bhana (Pan) made his T20I debut.

3 October 2023
14:00
Scorecard

Bermuda; 176/6 (20 overs)	v	Cayman Islands; 123/8 (20 overs)
Kamau Leverock 98 (59); Kevon Bazil 2/20 (4 overs)		Ramon Sealy 64 (38); Derrick Brangman 5/19 (4 overs)

Bermuda won by 53 runs
Bermuda National Stadium, Hamilton
Umpires: Vijaya Mallela (USA) and Jacqueline Williams (WI)
Player of the match: Derrick Brangman (Ber)

- Bermuda won the toss and elected to bat.

4 October 2023
09:30
Scorecard

Canada; 196/5 (20 overs)	v	Cayman Islands; 30 (11.3 overs)
Pargat Singh 82 (60); Conroy Wright 2/38 (4 overs)		Ramon Sealy 5 (9); Kaleem Sana 4/18 (4 overs)

Canada won by 166 runs
Bermuda National Stadium, Hamilton
Umpires: Emmerson Carrington (Ber) and Jermaine Lindo (USA)
Player of the match: Pargat Singh (Can)

- Canada won the toss and elected to bat.
- Shahid Ahmadzai (Can) and Mohan Manivannan (Cay) both made their T20I debuts.

4 October 2023
14:00
Scorecard

Panama; 86/9 (20 overs)	v	Bermuda; 89/5 (9.1 overs)
Laxman Gaonkar 23 (34); Delray Rawlins 3/10 (4 overs)		Delray Rawlins 33* (17); Yusuf Ebrahim 3/18 (2 overs)

Bermuda won by 5 wickets
Bermuda National Stadium, Hamilton
Umpires: Vijaya Mallela (USA) and Jacqueline Williams (WI)
Player of the match: Delray Rawlins (Ber)

- Bermuda won the toss and elected to field.
- Macquille Walker (Ber) made his T20I debut

6 October 2023
09:30
Scorecard

Bermuda	v	Cayman Islands

Match abandoned
White Hill Field, Sandys Parish
Umpires: Jermaine Lindo (USA) and Vijaya Mallela (USA)

- No toss
- No play was possible due to Tropical Storm Philippe.

6 October 2023
14:00
Scorecard

Canada	v	Panama

Match abandoned
White Hill Field, Sandys Parish
Umpires: Emmerson Carrington (Ber) and Jacqueline Williams (WI)

- No toss
- No play was possible due to Tropical Storm Philippe.

7 October 2023
09:30
Scorecard

Cayman Islands	v	Panama

Match abandoned
Bermuda National Stadium, Hamilton
Umpires: Emmerson Carrington (Ber) and Jermaine Lindo (USA)

- No toss
- No play was possible due to rain.

7 October 2023
14:00
Scorecard

Canada; 132/4 (18 overs)	v	Bermuda; 93 (16.5 overs)
Navneet Dhaliwal 45 (38); Dominic Sabir 2/34 (4 overs)		Terryn Fray 30 (35); Kaleem Sana 3/4 (3.5 overs)

Canada won by 39 runs
Bermuda National Stadium, Hamilton
Umpires: Vijaya Mallela (USA) and Jacqueline Williams (WI)
Player of the match: Kaleem Sana (Can)

- Canada won the toss and elected to bat.
- The match was reduced to 18 overs per side due to rain.
