= Canada at the Men's T20 World Cup =

Canada national team performance at T20 World Cup

The Canada national cricket team is one of the associate members of the International Cricket Council (ICC), they are nicknamed as the Maple Leafers. Canada qualified for their maiden T20 World Cup in 2024, after winning the Americas regional qualifier. The team failed to make it past the group stage but managed to secure one victory against the full member team, Ireland.

== T20 World Cup record ==
ICC T20 World Cup record										Qualification record (Note: WCL Division One served as the qualifier for the 2007 edition.)				
Year	Round	Position	Pld	W	L	T	NR	Ab (Note: Abandoned matches are not counted in the official records.)	Captain	Pld	W	L	T	NR
(South Africa) 2007	Did not qualify									5	2	3	0	0
(England) 2009	Did not qualify									3	2	1	0	0
(Cricket West Indies) 2010	Did not qualify									3	0	3	0	0
(Sri Lanka) 2012	Did not qualify									14	10	4	0	0
(Bangladesh) 2014	Did not qualify									8	2	6	0	0
(India) 2016	Did not qualify									12	6	5	0	1
(United Arab Emirates) (Oman) 2021	Did not qualify									18	13	4	0	1
(Australia) 2022	Did not qualify									4	2	2	0	0
(United States) (Cricket West Indies) 2024	Group stage	13/20	4	1	2	0	0	1	Saad Bin Zafar	6	4	1	0	1
(India) (Sri Lanka) 2026	Group stage	18/20	4	0	4	0	0	0	Dilpreet Bajwa	6	6	0	0	0
Total	0 Titles	2/10	8	1	6	0	0	1	—N/a	79	47	29	0	3

=== Record by opponents ===
Opponent	M	W	L	T+W	T+L	NR	Ab	Win %	First played
Afghanistan	1	0	1	0	0	0	0	0.00	2026
India	1	0	0	0	0	0	1	—	2024
Ireland	1	1	0	0	0	0	0	100	2024
New Zealand	1	0	1	0	0	0	0	0.00	2026
Pakistan	1	0	1	0	0	0	0	0.00	2024
South Africa	1	0	1	0	0	0	0	0.00	2026
United Arab Emirates	1	0	1	0	0	0	0	0.00	2026
United States	1	0	1	0	0	0	0	0.00	2024
Total	8	1	6	0	0	0	1	14.28	—
Source: Last Updated: 19 February 2026

== Tournament results ==
=== United States & West Indies 2024 ===
Squad and kit

- Saad Bin Zafar (c)
- Shreyas Movva (wk)
- Aaron Johnson
- Ravinderpal Singh
- Navneet Dhaliwal
- Kaleem Sana
- Dilon Heyliger
- Jeremy Gordon
- Nikhil Dutta
- Pargat Singh
- Nicholas Kirton
- Rayyankhan Pathan
- Junaid Siddiqui
- Dilpreet Bajwa
- Rishiv Joshi

2024 kit

Results

Group stage (Group A)					Super 8		Semifinal	Final	Overall Result
Opposition Result	Opposition Result	Opposition Result	Opposition Result	Rank	Opposition Result	Rank	Opposition Result	Opposition Result	Overall Result
United States; L by 7 wickets	Ireland; W by 12 runs	Pakistan; L by 7 wickets	India; Match abandoned	4	Did not advance				Group stage
Source: Cricinfo

Scorecards

Group stage (Group A)

1 June 2024
19:30 UTC−5 (N)
Scorecard

Canada; 194/5 (20 overs)	v	United States; 197/3 (17.4 overs)
Navneet Dhaliwal 61 (44); Harmeet Singh 1/27 (4 overs)		Aaron Jones 94* (40); Dillon Heyliger 1/19 (3 overs)

United States won by 7 wickets
Grand Prairie Stadium, Dallas
Umpires: Richard Illingworth (Eng) and Sharfuddoula (Ban)
Player of the match: Aaron Jones (USA)

- United States won the toss and elected to field.
- Canada made their T20 World Cup debuts.

7 June 2024
10:30 UTC−4
Scorecard

Canada; 137/7 (20 overs)	v	Ireland; 125/7 (20 overs)
Nicholas Kirton 49 (35); Barry McCarthy 2/24 (4 overs)		Mark Adair 34 (24); Jeremy Gordon 2/16 (4 overs)

Canada won by 12 runs
Nassau County International Cricket Stadium, East Meadow
Umpires: Richard Kettleborough (Eng) and Sam Nogajski (Aus)
Player of the match: Nicholas Kirton (Can)

- Ireland won the toss and elected to field.
- This was the first T20 World Cup match victory for Canada.

11 June 2024
10:30 UTC−4
Scorecard

Canada; 106/7 (20 overs)	v	Pakistan; 107/3 (17.3 overs)
Aaron Johnson 52 (44); Mohammad Amir 2/13 (4 overs)		Mohammad Rizwan 53* (53); Dillon Heyliger 2/18 (4 overs)

Pakistan won by 7 wickets
Nassau County International Cricket Stadium, East Meadow
Umpires: Kumar Dharmasena (SL) and Adrian Holdstock (SA)
Player of the match: Mohammad Amir (Pak)

- Pakistan won the toss and elected to field.

15 June 2024
10:30 UTC−4
Scorecard

Canada	v	India

Match abandoned
Central Broward Park, Lauderhill
Umpires: Richard Kettleborough (Eng) and Sharfuddoula (Ban)

- No toss.
- No play was possible because of rain.

=== India & Sri Lanka 2026 ===
Squad and kit

- Nicholas Kirton (c)
- Dilpreet Bajwa
- Saad Bin Zafar
- Navneet Dhaliwal
- Dilon Heyliger
- Ajayveer Hundal
- Shreyas Movva (wk)
- Ansh Patel
- Yuvraj Samra
- Kaleem Sana
- Shivam Sharma
- Jaskaran Singh
- Ravinderpal Singh
- Kanwarpal Tathgur
- Harsh Thaker

2026 kit

Results

Group stage (Group D)					Super 8		Semifinal	Final	Overall Result
Opposition Result	Opposition Result	Opposition Result	Opposition Result	Rank	Opposition Result	Rank	Opposition Result	Opposition Result	Overall Result
South Africa; L by 57 runs	United Arab Emirates; L by 5 wickets	New Zealand; L by 8 wickets	Afghanistan; L by 82 runs	5	Did not advance				Group stage
Source: Cricinfo

Scorecards

Group stage (Group D)

Match 9
9 February 2026
19:00 UTC+5:30 (N)
Scorecard

South Africa; 213/4 (20 overs)	v	Canada; 156/8 (20 overs)
Aiden Markram 59 (32); Ansh Patel 3/31 (4 overs)		Navneet Dhaliwal 64 (49); Lungi Ngidi 4/31 (4 overs)

South Africa won by 57 runs
Narendra Modi Stadium, Ahmedabad
Umpires: Jayaraman Madanagopal (Ind) and Nitin Menon (Ind)
Player of the match: Lungi Ngidi (SA)

- Canada won the toss and elected to field.
- This was the first time South Africa and Canada faced each other in T20Is.

Match 20
13 February 2026
15:00 UTC+5:30 (D/N)
Scorecard

Canada; 150/7 (20 overs)	v	United Arab Emirates; 151/5 (19.4 overs)
Harsh Thaker 50 (41); Junaid Siddique 5/35 (4 overs)		Aryansh Sharma 74* (53); Saad Bin Zafar 3/14 (4 overs)

United Arab Emirates won by 5 wickets
Arun Jaitley Cricket Stadium, New Delhi
Umpires: Adrian Holdstock (SA) and Gazi Sohel (Ban)
Player of the match: Junaid Siddique (UAE)

- Canada won the toss and elected to bat.
- Junaid Siddique (UAE) took his maiden five-wicket haul in T20Is and the 14th overall in T20 World Cups.

Match 31
17 February 2026
11:00 UTC+5:30
Scorecard

Canada; 173/4 (20 overs)	v	New Zealand; 176/2 (15.1 overs)
Yuvraaj Samra 110 (65); Jacob Duffy 1/25 (4 overs)		Glenn Phillips 76* (36); Saad Bin Zafar 1/29 (3 overs)

New Zealand won by 8 wickets
M. A. Chidambaram Stadium, Chennai
Umpires: Jayaraman Madanagopal (Ind) and Sharfuddoula (Ban)
Player of the match: Glenn Phillips (NZ)

- Canada won the toss and elected to bat.
- This was the first time Canada and New Zealand faced each other in T20Is.
- Yuvraj Samra and Dilpreet Bajwa's 116-run partnership was the highest for any wicket by Canada in the T20 World Cup.
- Yuvraj Samra became the first Canadian player, the first player from an Associate nation and the youngest player from any nation to score a century in a T20 World Cup. This was the second century in the 2026 tournament and 13th overall in the T20 World Cup history.
- New Zealand qualified for the Super 8 while Afghanistan, United Arab Emirates and Canada were eliminated as a result of this match.

Match 39
19 February 2026
19:00 UTC+5:30 (N)
Scorecard

Afghanistan; 200/4 (20 overs)	v	Canada; 118/8 (20 overs)
Ibrahim Zadran 95* (56); Jaskaran Singh 3/52 (4 overs)		Harsh Thaker 30 (24); Mohammad Nabi 4/7 (4 overs)

Afghanistan won by 82 runs
M. A. Chidambaram Stadium, Chennai
Umpires: Nitin Menon (Ind) and Gazi Sohel (Ban)
Player of the match: Ibrahim Zadran (Afg)

- Canada won the toss and elected to field.

== Records and statistics ==
=== Team records ===
Highest innings totals

Score	Opponent	Venue	Season
194/5 (20 overs)	United States	Dallas	2024
137/7 (20 overs)	Ireland	New York	2024
106/7 (20 overs)	Pakistan	New York	2024
Last updated: 15 June 2024

=== Batting statistics ===
Most runs

Runs	Player	Mat	Inn	HS	Avg	100s	50s	Period
101	Nicholas Kirton	3	3	51	33.66	—N/a	1	2024–2024
89	Aaron Johnson	3	3	52	29.66	—N/a	1	2024–2024
71	Navneet Dhaliwal	3	3	61	23.66	—N/a	1	2024–2024
71	Shreyas Movva	3	3	37	35.50	—N/a	—N/a	2024–2024
25	Pargat Singh	3	3	18	8.33	—N/a	—N/a	2024–2024
Last updated: 15 June 2024

Highest partnerships

Runs	Players	Opposition	Venue	Season
75 (5th wicket)	Shreyas Movva (29) & Nicholas Kirton (44)	v Ireland	New York	2024
62 (3rd wicket)	Navneet Dhaliwal (30) & Nicholas Kirton (32)	v United States	Dallas	2024
43 (1st wicket)	Navneet Dhaliwal (14) & Aaron Johnson (23)	v United States	Dallas	2024
31 (4th wicket)	Nicholas Kirton (19) & Shreyas Movva (10)	v United States	Dallas	2024
23 (2nd wicket)	Pargat Singh (5) & Navneet Dhaliwal (17)	v United States	Dallas	2024
Last updated: 15 June 2024

=== Bowling statistics ===
Most wickets

Wickets	Player	Matches	Avg.	Econ.	BBI	4W	5W	Period
5	Dillon Heyliger	3	11.00	5.00	2/18	0	0	2024–2024
3	Jeremy Gordon	3	25.66	7.33	2/16	0	0	2024–2024
1	Nikhil Dutta	1	41.00	15.37	1/41	0	0	2024–2024
1	Junaid Siddiqui	2	55.00	7.85	1/27	1	0	2024–2024
1	Saad Bin Zafar	3	87.00	7.25	1/22	0	0	2024–2024
1	Kaleem Sana	3	93.00	8.45	1/34	0	0	2024–2024
Last updated: 15 June 2024
