= 2023 Men's T20 World Cup Americas sub-regional qualifier =

Cricket qualification tournament

The 2024 ICC Men's T20 World Cup was the ninth edition of the ICC Men's T20 World Cup, a biennial world cup for cricket in Twenty20 International (T20I) format, organized by the International Cricket Council (ICC). The qualification process for the world cup included two stages: direct qualification and regional qualification. The regional qualification for Americas was held in two stages: sub-regional qualifier and regional final.

The Americas region's sub-regional qualifier was hosted by Argentine Cricket Association from 25 February to 4 March 2023. Belize, Brazil and Suriname withdrew from the qualifier in February 2023. Bermuda, Cayman Islands and Panama advanced to the regional final after finishing atop the points table. Bermuda's Kamau Leverock was named player of the series having scored the most runs (202) while Argentina's Hernán Fennell took the most wickets (9) in the tournament.

== Preparation ==
Argentina and Bermuda played a two-match T20I series in preparation for the qualifier. Bermuda won both of the matches.

21 February 2023
14:00
Scorecard

Argentina; 77 (17.2 overs)	v	Bermuda; 78/4 (15.5 overs)
Pedro Arrighi 18 (22); Delray Rawlins 4/10 (4 overs)		Malachi Jones 19* (27); Agustin Husain 1/9 (2 overs)

Bermuda won by 6 wickets
Club San Albano, Burzaco
Umpires: Emmerson Carrington (Ber) and Nigel Duguid (WI)
Player of the match: Delray Rawlins (Ber)

- Argentina won the toss and elected to bat.
- Agustin Rivero (Arg) and Jarryd Richardson (Ber) both made their T20I debuts.

22 February 2023
15:00
Scorecard

Bermuda; 226/4 (20 overs)	v	Argentina; 119/5 (20 overs)
Kamau Leverock 97 (56); Tomas Rossi 2/29 (4 overs)		Pedro Baron 57 (68); Delray Rawlins 2/18 (4 overs)

Bermuda won by 107 runs
Estadio Belgrano Athletic, Buenos Aires
Umpires: Emmerson Carrington (Ber) and Nigel Duguid (WI)
Player of the match: Delray Rawlins (Ber)

- Argentina won the toss and elected to field.
- David Mauro (Arg) and Jacob Albertze (Ber) both made their T20I debuts.

Bermuda cricket team in Argentina in 2022–23
	Argentina	Bermuda
- Dates: 21 – 22 February 2023
Captains	Hernán Fennell	Delray Rawlins

Twenty20 International series
- Results: Bermuda won the 2-match series 2–0
Most runs	Pedro Baron (72)	Kamau Leverock (110)
Most wickets	Pedro Arrighi (3)	Delray Rawlins (6)

== Qualifier ==
2023 ICC Men's T20 World Cup Americas sub-regional qualifier
- Dates: 25 February – 4 March 2023
- Administrator(s): International Cricket Council; ICC Americas
- Cricket format: Twenty20 International
- Tournament format: Round-robin
- Host: Argentina
- Champions: Bermuda
- Runners-up: Cayman Islands
- Participants: 5
- Matches: 10
- Player of the series: (Bermuda) Kamau Leverock
- Most runs: (Bermuda) Kamau Leverock (202)
- Most wickets: (Argentina) Hernán Fennell (9)

Squads for the qualifier
Argentina	Bahamas	Bermuda
Hernán Fennell (c); Bruno Angeletti; Pedro Arrighi; Pedro Baron; Ramiro Escobar (wk); Alejandro Ferguson; Agustin Husain; Alan Kirschbaum; David Mauro; Lautaro Musiani; Augusto Mustafa; Agustin Rivero; Santiago Rossi; Tomas Rossi	Marc Taylor (c); Jonathan Barry; Festus Benn (wk); Turan Brown; Keith Burrows; Narendra Ekanayake; Sandeep Goud; Everette Haven; Kervon Hinds; Julio Jemison; Ashok Nair; Junior Scott; Gregory Taylor (wk); Dwight Wheatley	Delray Rawlins (c); Jacob Albertze; Derrick Brangman; Zeko Burgess; Jabari Darrell; Terryn Fray (wk); Malachi Jones; Kamau Leverock; Tre Manders; Justin Pitcher; Jarryd Richardson (wk); Dominic Sabir; Sinclair Smith (wk); ~~Charles Trott~~; Matthew Watson
Cayman Islands	Panama	
Ramon Sealy (c, wk); Jahmeal Buchanan; Paul Chin (wk); Brian Corbin; Sacha De Alwis; Patrick Heron; Thilina Hewa; Alistair Ifill; Demar Johnson; Paul Manning; Troy Taylor; Omar Willis (wk); Adrian Wright; Conroy Wright	Irfan Hafejee (c); Anilkumar Natubhai Ahir (wk); Khengar Bhai Ahir; Nikunj Ahir; Rahul Ahir; Vishal Ahir; Abdullah Jasat; Mahmud Jasat; Ahmed Patel; Faizan Patel; Huzaifa Patel (wk); Sohel Patel; Mohmad Sohel Patel; Ahmadi Ravat (wk)	

- Charles Trott was ruled out of the Bermuda squad after suffering a broken ankle during a warm-up event in Florida and was replaced by Jarryd Richardson.

=== Standings ===
Pos	Team	Pld	W	L	NR	Pts	NRR	Qualification
1	Bermuda	4	4	0	0	8	4.897	Advanced to the regional final
2	Cayman Islands	4	3	1	0	6	−0.638	Advanced to the regional final
3	Panama	4	1	3	0	2	−0.413	Advanced to the regional final
4	Argentina	4	1	3	0	2	−1.527	
5	Bahamas	4	1	3	0	2	−1.785	

Source: ESPNcricinfo

=== Fixtures ===
25 February 2023
10:30
Scorecard

Panama; 139/8 (20 overs)	v	Argentina; 86 (17.1 overs)
Mohmad Sohel Patel 42 (30); Hernán Fennell 3/17 (4 overs)		Alejandro Ferguson 25 (39); Khengar Bhai Ahir 3/16 (4 overs)

Panama won by 53 runs
Hurlingham Club Ground, Buenos Aires
Umpires: Jermaine Lindo (USA) and Arnold Maddela (Can)
Player of the match: Mohmad Sohel Patel (Pan)

- Argentina won the toss and elected to field.
- Rahul Ahir, Vishal Ahir, Ahmed Patel, Faizan Patel, Sohel Patel and Ahmadi Ravat (Pan) all made their T20I debuts.

25 February 2023
15:00
Scorecard

Bermuda; 173/3 (20 overs)	v	Cayman Islands; 77/9 (20 overs)
Delray Rawlins 59* (43); Adrian Wright 2/19 (4 overs)		Alistair Ifill 25 (39); Kamau Leverock 3/15 (4 overs)

Bermuda won by 96 runs
Club San Albano, Burzaco
Umpires: Sameer Bandekar (USA) and Nigel Duguid (WI)
Player of the match: Kamau Leverock (Ber)

- Bermuda won the toss and elected to bat.
- Thilina Hewa and Adrian Wright (Cay) both made their T20I debuts.

26 February 2023
10:30
Scorecard

Panama; 101/9 (20 overs)	v	Bahamas; 105/6 (18.3 overs)
Faizan Patel 23 (24); Jonathan Barry 2/3 (2 overs)		Marc Taylor 49 (32); Rahul Ahir 3/14 (4 overs)

Bahamas won by 4 wickets
Hurlingham Club Ground, Buenos Aires
Umpires: Emmerson Carrington (Ber) and Nigel Duguid (WI)
Player of the match: Marc Taylor (Bah)

- Panama won the toss and elected to bat.
- Turan Brown, Narendra Ekanayake, Junior Scott (Bah) and Huzaifa Patel (Pan) all made their T20I debuts.

26 February 2023
15:00
Scorecard

Bermuda; 220/2 (20 overs)	v	Argentina; 110/9 (20 overs)
Tre Manders 74 (41); Alan Kirschbaum 1/44 (4 overs)		Alejandro Ferguson 32 (32); Delray Rawlins 4/11 (4 overs)

Bermuda won by 110 runs
Estadio Belgrano Athletic, Buenos Aires
Umpires: Arnold Maddela (Can) and Vijaya Mallela (USA)
Player of the match: Delray Rawlins (Ber)

- Bermuda won the toss and elected to bat.

28 February 2023
10:30
Scorecard

Cayman Islands; 125 (19.5 overs)	v	Bahamas; 94/8 (20 overs)
Sacha De Alwis 74 (57); Kervon Hinds 5/18 (4 overs)		Marc Taylor 35 (37); Jahmeal Buchanan 2/13 (3 overs)

Cayman Islands won by 31 runs
Club San Albano, Burzaco
Umpires: Sameer Bandekar (USA) and Emmerson Carrington (Ber)
Player of the match: Sacha De Alwis (Cay)

- Cayman Islands won the toss and elected to bat.
- Jahmeal Buchanan and Brian Corbin (Cay) both made their T20I debuts.
- Kervon Hinds became the first bowler for Bahamas to take a five-wicket haul in T20Is.

28 February 2023
15:00
Scorecard

Bermuda; 196/1 (20 overs)	v	Panama; 136/6 (20 overs)
Kamau Leverock 103 (58); Anilkumar Natubhai Ahir 1/19 (3 overs)		Anilkumar Natubhai Ahir 51 (34); Kamau Leverock 2/15 (2 overs)

Bermuda won by 60 runs
Estadio Belgrano Athletic, Buenos Aires
Umpires: Nigel Duguid (WI) and Vijaya Mallela (USA)
Player of the match: Kamau Leverock (Ber)

- Bermuda won the toss and elected to bat.
- Kamau Leverock became the first player for Bermuda to score a century in T20Is.

2 March 2023
10:30
Scorecard

Cayman Islands; 138/7 (20 overs)	v	Panama; 126 (19.5 overs)
Ramon Sealy 38 (29); Irfan Hafejee 3/18 (4 overs)		Vishal Ahir 24 (13); Alistair Ifill 3/24 (4 overs)

Cayman Islands won by 12 runs
Hurlingham Club Ground, Buenos Aires
Umpires: Nigel Duguid (WI) and Arnold Maddela (Can)
Player of the match: Ramon Sealy (Cay)

- Cayman Islands won the toss and elected to bat.

2 March 2023
15:00
Scorecard

Argentina; 117/7 (20 overs)	v	Bahamas; 74 (19.3 overs)
Lautaro Musiani 44* (34); Marc Taylor 3/17 (4 overs)		Gregory Taylor 19 (29); Hernán Fennell 4/16 (3.3 overs)

Argentina won by 43 runs
Club San Albano, Burzaco
Umpires: Emmerson Carrington (Ber) and Jermaine Lindo (USA)
Player of the match: Lautaro Musiani (Arg)

- Argentina won the toss and elected to bat.

4 March 2023
10:30
Scorecard

Bahamas; 73/9 (20 overs)	v	Bermuda; 74/1 (7.2 overs)
Jonathan Barry 30* (51); Derrick Brangman 4/15 (4 overs)		Kamau Leverock 48* (26); Jonathan Barry 1/10 (1.2 overs)

Bermuda won by 9 wickets
Hurlingham Club Ground, Buenos Aires
Umpires: Sameer Bandekar (USA) and Vijaya Mallela (USA)
Player of the match: Kamau Leverock (Ber)

- Bermuda won the toss and elected to field.

4 March 2023
15:00
Scorecard

Argentina; 125/7 (20 overs)	v	Cayman Islands; 126/7 (19.5 overs)
Alejandro Ferguson 50 (56); Troy Taylor 3/22 (4 overs)		Sacha De Alwis 44 (41); Santiago Rossi 2/27 (4 overs)

Cayman Islands won by 3 wickets
Estadio Belgrano Athletic, Buenos Aires
Umpires: Nigel Duguid (WI) and Jermaine Lindo (USA)
Player of the match: Alejandro Ferguson (Arg)

- Argentina won the toss and elected to bat.
