= White Hill Field =

Cricket ground in Bermuda

Coordinates: 32.27180°N 64.87379°W

- Location: Sandys Parish, Bermuda
- First T20I: 18 August 2019: Bermuda v United States
- Last T20I: 1 October 2023: Canada v Cayman Islands
- As of 6 October 2023; Source: Cricinfo

White Hill Field is a cricket ground in Sandys Parish, Bermuda. In June 2019, it was named as one of the two venues to host cricket matches for Bermuda's Twenty20 series against the Bahamas, and the Regional Finals of the 2018–19 ICC T20 World Cup Americas Qualifier tournament. Mid-way through the Americas Qualifier tournament, the pitch at the Bermuda National Stadium was deemed to be unsuitable, and the matches scheduled to be played at the stadium were moved to White Hill Field.

White Hill Field hosted matches in the Americas Qualifier regional finals of the 2024 ICC Men's T20 World Cup

== List of centuries ==
=== Twenty20 Internationals ===
No.	Score	Player	Team	Balls	Inns.	Opposing team	Date	Result
1	101	Ravinderpal Singh	Canada	48	1	Cayman Islands	18 August 2019	Won

== List of five-wicket hauls ==
=== Twenty20 Internationals ===
No.	Bowler	Date	Team	Opposing team	Inn	Overs	Runs	Wkts	Econ	Result
1	Allan Douglas	25 August 2019	Bermuda	Cayman Islands	1	2.2	18	5	7.71	Won
