= 2025 United States Tri-Nation Series =

Twelfth tri-nation series round in 2024-26 WCL2

- Part of 2024–2026 Cricket World Cup League 2
- Date: 17–27 May 2025
- Location: United States
Teams
Canada	Oman	United States
Captains
Navneet Dhaliwal	Jatinder Singh	Monank Patel
Most runs
Pargat Singh (165)	Jatinder Singh (173)	Smit Patel (254)
Most wickets
Shivam Sharma (7)	Shakeel Ahmed (9)	Milind Kumar (9)

The 2025 United States Tri-Nation Series was the twelfth round of the 2024–2026 Cricket World Cup League 2 cricket tournament that took place in the United States in May 2025. It was a tri-nation series contested by the men's national teams of Canada, Oman and the United States. The matches were played as One Day International (ODI) fixtures.

== Squads ==
Canada	Oman	United States
Navneet Dhaliwal (c); Mansab Gill; Dillon Heyliger; Ajayveer Hundal; Nicholas Kirton; Parveen Kumar; Jatinderpal Matharu; Shreyas Movva (wk); Saad Bin Zafar; Yuvraj Samra; Kaleem Sana; Anop Santosh (wk); Shivam Sharma; Jaskaran Singh; Pargat Singh; Harsh Thaker	Jatinder Singh (c, wk); Vinayak Shukla (vc, wk); Shakeel Ahmed; Mujibur Ali; Aryan Bisht; Muhammed Imran; Aamir Kaleem; Pruthvikumar Macchi; Sufyan Mehmood; Hammad Mirza (wk); Mohammad Nadeem; Jay Odedra; Muzahir Raza; Hassnain Shah; Samay Shrivastava	Monank Patel (c, wk); Jessy Singh (vc); Juanoy Drysdale; Andries Gous (wk); Shayan Jahangir (wk); Aaron Jones; Nosthush Kenjige; Sanjay Krishnamurthi; Milind Kumar; Yasir Mohammad; Saiteja Mukkamalla; Saurabh Netravalkar; Smit Patel (wk); Harmeet Singh; Shadley van Schalkwyk

United States named Prannav Chettipalayam, Ali Sheikh and Stephen Wiig as reserves in their squad.

== Fixtures ==
=== 1st ODI ===
17 May 2025
10:00
Scorecard

United States; 361/3 (50 overs)	v	Canada; 192 (46.2 overs)
Smit Patel 152* (137); Saad Bin Zafar 2/57 (10 overs)		Mansab Gill 54* (69); Sanjay Krishnamurthi 3/10 (3.2 overs)

United States won by 169 runs
Broward County Stadium, Lauderhill
Umpires: Vijaya Mallela (USA) and Leslie Reifer (WI)
Player of the match: Smit Patel (USA)

- United States won the toss and elected to bat.
- Mansab Gill and Shivam Sharma (Can) both made their ODI debuts.
- Smit Patel (USA) scored his first century in ODIs.

=== 2nd ODI ===
19 May 2025
10:00
Scorecard

Oman; 217/6 (50 overs)	v	Canada; 202 (49 overs)
Hammad Mirza 77 (103); Shivam Sharma 2/27 (8 overs)		Pargat Singh 85 (104); Samay Shrivastava 3/31 (10 overs)

Oman won by 15 runs
Broward County Stadium, Lauderhill
Umpires: Jermaine Lindo (USA) and Vijaya Mallela (USA)
Player of the match: Mohammad Nadeem (Oma)

- Oman won the toss and elected to bat.
- Jatinderpal Matharu (Can), Mujibur Ali and Muhammed Imran (Oma) all made their ODI debuts.

=== 3rd ODI ===
21 May 2025
10:00
Scorecard

Oman; 266 (49.4 overs)	v	United States; 266/9 (50 overs)
Jatinder Singh 100 (101); Milind Kumar 5/66 (9.4 overs)		Milind Kumar 68 (65); Samay Shrivastava 3/68 (9 overs)

Match tied (Oman won the Super Over)
Broward County Stadium, Lauderhill
Umpires: Jermaine Lindo (USA) and Leslie Reifer (WI)
Player of the match: Jatinder Singh (Oma)

- United States won the toss and elected to field.
- Super Over: United States 13/0, Oman 14/0
- Milind Kumar (USA) took his first five-wicket haul in ODIs.

=== 4th ODI ===
23 May 2025
10:00
Scorecard

Canada; 212 (48.4 overs)	v	Oman; 108/3 (23.1 overs)
Navneet Dhaliwal 73 (120); Mohammad Nadeem 2/9 (1.4 overs)		Hammad Mirza 31 (33); Dillon Heyliger 1/13 (3 overs)

Oman won by 18 runs (DLS method)
Broward County Stadium, Lauderhill
Umpires: Jermaine Lindo (USA) and Vijaya Mallela (USA)

- Canada won the toss and elected to bat.
- No further play was possible due to rain.
- Aryan Bisht (Oma) made his ODI debut.

=== 5th ODI ===
25 May 2025
10:00
Scorecard

United States; 286/9 (50 overs)	v	Canada; 198 (46.1 overs)
Shayan Jahangir 89 (69); Shivam Sharma 4/69 (8 overs)		Harsh Thaker 66 (79); Saurabh Netravalkar 4/33 (8.1 overs)

United States won by 88 runs
Broward County Stadium, Lauderhill
Umpires: Vijaya Mallela (USA) and Leslie Reifer (WI)
Player of the match: Shayan Jahangir (USA)

- United States won the toss and elected to bat.
- Anop Santosh (Can) made his ODI debut.

=== 6th ODI ===
27 May 2025
10:00
Scorecard

United States; 293/8 (50 overs)	v	Oman; 284/9 (50 overs)
Saiteja Mukkamalla 73 (79); Sufyan Mehmood 3/58 (9 overs)		Sufyan Mehmood 72 (51); Jessy Singh 3/64 (10 overs)

United States won by 9 runs
Broward County Stadium, Lauderhill
Umpires: Jermaine Lindo (USA) and Leslie Reifer (WI)
Player of the match: Harmeet Singh (USA)

- Oman won the toss and elected to field.
- Saurabh Netravalkar became the first player to take 100 wickets for the United States in men's ODIs.
