= 2024 Men's T20 World Cup qualification =

2024 ICC Men's T20 World Cup qualification
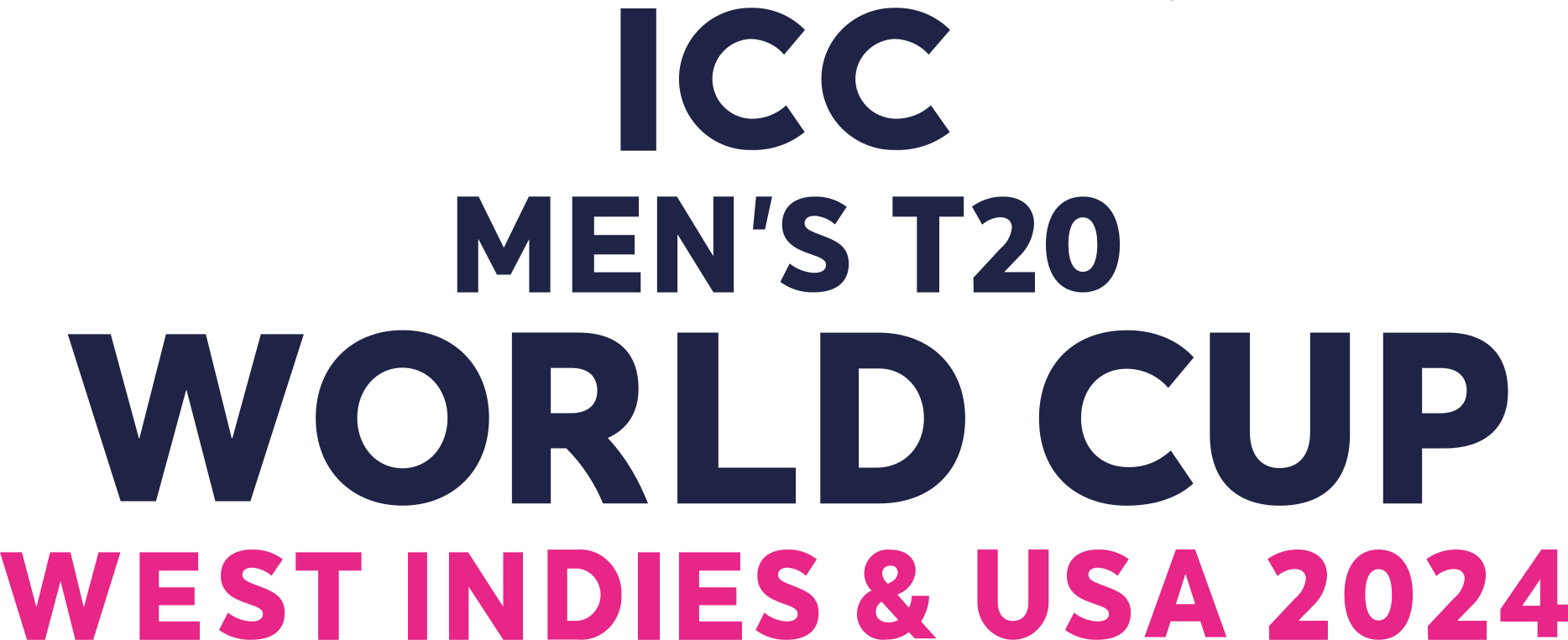
- Dates: 12 July 2022 – 30 November 2023
- Administrators: International Cricket Council; Africa Cricket Association; Asian Cricket Council; ICC Americas; ICC East Asia-Pacific; ICC Europe
- Cricket format: Twenty20 International
- Host: Various
- Participants: 12 (direct qualification); 84 (regional qualification)
- Matches: 255
- Most runs: (Bermuda) Kamau Leverock (415)
- Most wickets: (Denmark) Nicolaj Laegsgaard (20)

The 2024 ICC Men's T20 World Cup was the ninth edition of the ICC Men's T20 World Cup, a biennial world cup for cricket in Twenty20 International (T20I) format, organized by the International Cricket Council (ICC). It was co-hosted by Cricket West Indies and USA Cricket from 1 to 29 June 2024. It was the first major ICC tournament to include matches played in the United States. The West Indies had previously hosted the 2010 competition.

In June 2021, the ICC announced that the men's T20 World Cup would expand to 20 teams beginning in 2024 onwards from 16 teams until 2022. The qualification process for the 2024 tournament included two stages: direct qualification and regional qualification. 12 teams were awarded direct qualification while 81 teams took part in the regional qualification to compete for the remaining 8 spots. The regional qualification included series of sub-regional qualifiers and regional finals held between July 2022 and November 2023.

== Format ==
The top eight teams from the previous edition along with the 2024 hosts and the next best two to four teams (depending on the finishing positions of the hosts in the previous edition) from the ICC Men's T20I Team Rankings were awarded direct qualification for the tournament. The remaining eight teams were decided by regional qualifiers. Each regional qualifier were held in two stages:

- Sub-regional qualifiers: This stage comprised one or more tournaments depending on the ICC region. Matches were held in either single round-robin or double round-robin format and sometimes included group stage and knockout stage or playoffs formats as well. The stipulated number of teams advanced into the next stage.
- Regional final: Top teams unable to earn direct qualification along with teams advancing from the sub-regional qualifier took part in this stage. Matches were held in either single round-robin or double round-robin format and sometimes included group stage and knockout stage or playoffs formats as well. The stipulated number of teams advanced to the 2024 T20 World Cup.

Summary of the qualification process
ICC region	Slots per region	No. of direct qualified teams	Remaining slots	Regional qualifiers		
ICC region	Slots per region	No. of direct qualified teams	Remaining slots	No. of participants	Start date	End date
Africa	3	1	2	19	17 November 2022	30 November 2023
Americas	3	2	1	6(9) (Note: Three teams withdrew ahead of the sub-regional qualifier.)	25 February 2023	7 October 2023
Asia	7	5	2	15	26 July 2023	5 November 2023
East Asia-Pacific	3	2	1	9	9 September 2022	29 July 2023
Europe	4	2	2	32	12 July 2022	28 July 2023
Total	20	12	8	81(84)		

== Qualified teams ==
Highlighted are the countries that participated in the 2024 Men's T20 World Cup qualification pathway. Qualified directly (hosts, top 8 from the previous tournament, or via T20I Rankings) Qualified via the regional qualifiers Participated in the regional qualifiers but failed to qualify Withdrew or suspended

Details of the teams qualified for the T20 World Cup
Team	Method of qualification	Date of qualification	Venue(s)	Number of teams	Total times qualified	Last time qualified	Previous best performance
United States	Hosts	16 November 2021	—N/a	2	1	—N/a	—N/a
West Indies	Hosts	16 November 2021	—N/a	2	9	2022	Winners (2012, 2016)
Australia	2022 Men's T20 World Cup (Top 8 teams from the previous tournament)	13 November 2022	Australia	8	9	2022	Winners (2021)
England	2022 Men's T20 World Cup (Top 8 teams from the previous tournament)	13 November 2022	Australia	8	9	2022	Winners (2010, 2022)
India	2022 Men's T20 World Cup (Top 8 teams from the previous tournament)	13 November 2022	Australia	8	9	2022	Winners (2007)
Netherlands	2022 Men's T20 World Cup (Top 8 teams from the previous tournament)	13 November 2022	Australia	8	6	2022	Super 12 (2022)
New Zealand	2022 Men's T20 World Cup (Top 8 teams from the previous tournament)	13 November 2022	Australia	8	9	2022	Runners-up (2021)
Pakistan	2022 Men's T20 World Cup (Top 8 teams from the previous tournament)	13 November 2022	Australia	8	9	2022	Winners (2009)
South Africa	2022 Men's T20 World Cup (Top 8 teams from the previous tournament)	13 November 2022	Australia	8	9	2022	Semi-finals (2009, 2014)
Sri Lanka	2022 Men's T20 World Cup (Top 8 teams from the previous tournament)	13 November 2022	Australia	8	9	2022	Winners (2014)
Afghanistan	ICC Men's T20I Team Rankings	14 November 2022	—N/a	2	7	2022	Super 10 (2016)
Bangladesh	ICC Men's T20I Team Rankings	14 November 2022	—N/a	2	9	2022	Super 8 (2007)
Ireland	Europe Qualifier	20 – 28 July 2023	Scotland	2	8	2022	Super 8 (2009)
Scotland	Europe Qualifier	20 – 28 July 2023	Scotland	2	6	2022	Super 12 (2021)
Papua New Guinea	East Asia-Pacific Qualifier	22 – 29 July 2023	Papua New Guinea	1	2	2021	First round (2021)
Canada	Americas Qualifier	30 September – 7 October 2023	Bermuda	1	1	—N/a	—N/a
Nepal	Asia Qualifier	30 October – 5 November 2023	Nepal	2	2	2014	First round (2014)
Oman	Asia Qualifier	30 October – 5 November 2023	Nepal	2	3	2016	First round (2016, 2021)
Namibia	Africa Qualifier	22 – 30 November 2023	Namibia	2	3	2022	Super 12 (2021)
Uganda	Africa Qualifier	22 – 30 November 2023	Namibia	2	1	—N/a	—N/a
Total				20			

== Africa qualifier ==
The qualification stages were as follows:

- Qualifier A: Eight teams played in round-robin format for 28 matches from 17 to 25 November 2022 in Rwanda.
- Qualifier B: Eight teams played in round-robin format for 28 matches from 1 to 9 December 2022 in Rwanda.
- Regional final: Seven teams played in round-robin format for 21 matches from 22 to 30 November 2023 in Namibia.

=== Africa sub-regional qualifiers ===
Both of the sub-regional qualifiers were hosted by Rwanda Cricket Association. The top two sides of each sub-regional qualifier (Kenya and Rwanda from qualifier A and Tanzania and Nigeria from qualifier B) advanced to the regional final.

==== Africa qualifier A ====
Pos	Team	Pld	W	L	NR	Pts	NRR	Qualification
1	Kenya	7	5	0	2	12	5.699	Advanced to the regional final
2	Rwanda	7	5	1	1	11	2.466	Advanced to the regional final
3	Malawi	7	4	1	2	10	2.026	
4	Botswana	7	3	3	1	7	1.167	
5	Saint Helena	7	2	3	2	6	−0.976	
6	Lesotho	7	2	4	1	5	−3.497	
7	Seychelles	7	0	4	3	3	−1.639	
8	Mali	7	0	5	2	2	−4.954	

Source: ESPNcricinfo

==== Africa qualifier B ====
Pos	Team	Pld	W	L	NR	Pts	NRR	Qualification
1	Tanzania	7	6	0	1	13	4.891	Advanced to the regional final
2	Nigeria	7	6	0	1	13	3.739	Advanced to the regional final
3	Mozambique	7	5	2	0	10	0.684	
4	Sierra Leone	7	4	3	0	8	−0.039	
5	Ghana	7	3	4	0	6	1.446	
6	Eswatini	7	1	5	1	3	−2.067	
7	Gambia	7	1	6	0	2	−3.865	
8	Cameroon	7	0	6	1	1	−3.872	

Source: ESPNcricinfo

=== Africa regional final ===
Namibia and Zimbabwe directly qualified for the regional final after receiving a bye due to their participation in the 2022 T20 World Cup. Uganda also received a bye after taking part in the 2022 global qualifiers. The regional final was hosted by Cricket Namibia. The top two sides of the regional final, Namibia and Uganda qualified for the T20 World Cup.

Final points
Pos	Team	Pld	W	L	NR	Pts	NRR	Qualification
1	Namibia	6	6	0	0	12	2.658	Qualified for the 2024 Men's T20 World Cup
2	Uganda	6	5	1	0	10	1.334	Qualified for the 2024 Men's T20 World Cup
3	Zimbabwe	6	4	2	0	8	2.922	
4	Kenya	6	3	3	0	6	−0.911	
5	Nigeria	6	1	4	1	3	−1.026	
6	Tanzania	6	1	5	0	2	−1.507	
7	Rwanda	6	0	5	1	1	−4.303	

Source: ESPNcricinfo

== Americas qualifier ==
The qualification stages were as follows:

- Sub-regional qualifier: Five teams played in round-robin format for 10 matches from 25 February to 4 March 2023 in Argentina.
- Regional final: Four teams played in double round-robin format for 12 matches from 30 September to 7 October 2023 in Bermuda.

=== Americas sub-regional qualifier ===
The sub-regional qualifier was hosted by Argentine Cricket Association. Belize, Brazil and Suriname withdrew from the qualifier in February 2023. The top three sides of the sub-regional qualifier, Bermuda, Cayman Islands and Panama advanced to the regional final.

Pos	Team	Pld	W	L	NR	Pts	NRR	Qualification
1	Bermuda	4	4	0	0	8	4.897	Advanced to the regional final
2	Cayman Islands	4	3	1	0	6	−0.638	Advanced to the regional final
3	Panama	4	1	3	0	2	−0.413	Advanced to the regional final
4	Argentina	4	1	3	0	2	−1.527	
5	Bahamas	4	1	3	0	2	−1.785	

Source: ESPNcricinfo

=== Americas regional final ===
Canada directly qualified for the regional final after receiving a bye due to their participation in the 2022 global qualifiers. The regional final was hosted by Bermuda Cricket Board. The winners of the regional final, Canada qualified for the T20 World Cup.

Pos	Team	Pld	W	L	NR	Pts	NRR	Qualification
1	Canada	6	4	1	1	9	3.980	Qualified for the 2024 Men's T20 World Cup
2	Bermuda	6	4	1	1	9	2.410	
3	Cayman Islands	6	1	3	2	4	−3.748	
4	Panama	6	0	4	2	2	−4.561	

Source: ESPNcricinfo

== Asia qualifier ==
The qualification stages were as follows:

- Qualifier A: Four teams played in double round-robin format for 12 matches from 28 September to 5 October 2023 in Qatar.
- Qualifier B: Five teams played in round-robin format for 10 matches from 26 July to 1 August 2023 in Malaysia.
- Regional final: Eight teams divided into two groups of four played in round-robin format followed by a knockout stage of four teams for a total of 15 matches from 30 October to 5 November 2023 in Nepal.

=== Asia sub-regional qualifiers ===
The sub-regional qualifiers were hosted by Qatar Cricket Association and Malaysian Cricket Association. The table-toppers of each sub-regional qualifier (Kuwait from qualifier A and Malaysia from qualifier B) advanced to the regional final.

==== Asia qualifier A ====
Pos	Team	Pld	W	L	NR	Pts	NRR	Qualification
1	Kuwait	6	5	1	0	10	2.202	Advance to the regional final
2	Saudi Arabia	6	5	1	0	10	1.447	
3	Qatar	6	2	4	0	4	0.349	
4	Maldives	6	0	6	0	0	−4.332	

Source: ESPNcricinfo

==== Asia qualifier B ====
Pos	Team	Pld	W	L	NR	Pts	NRR	Qualification
1	Malaysia	4	4	0	0	8	5.986	Advance to the regional final
2	Thailand	4	3	1	0	6	2.927	
3	Bhutan	4	2	2	0	4	−0.085	
4	China	4	1	3	0	2	−3.537	
5	Myanmar	4	0	4	0	0	−4.196	

Source: ESPNcricinfo

=== Asia regional final ===
United Arab Emirates directly qualified for the regional final after receiving a bye due to their participation in the 2022 T20 World Cup. Bahrain, Hong Kong, Nepal, Oman and Singapore also received a bye after taking part in the 2022 global qualifiers. The regional final was hosted by Cricket Association of Nepal. The top two sides of the regional final, Oman and Nepal qualified for the T20 World Cup.

Group stage

Pos	Team	Pld	W	L	NR	Pts	NRR	Qualification
1	Oman	3	3	0	0	6	0.983	Advanced to the semi-finals
2	Nepal	3	2	1	0	4	0.729	Advanced to the semi-finals
3	Malaysia	3	1	2	0	2	0.187	
4	Singapore	3	0	3	0	0	−1.936	

Source: ESPNcricinfo

Pos	Team	Pld	W	L	NR	Pts	NRR	Qualification
1	United Arab Emirates	3	3	0	0	6	1.445	Advanced to the semi-finals
2	Bahrain	3	1	2	0	2	−0.398	Advanced to the semi-finals
3	Hong Kong	3	1	2	0	2	−0.433	
4	Kuwait	3	1	2	0	2	−0.649	

Source: ESPNcricinfo

Knockout stage

- Oman defeated Bahrain by 10 wickets in the semi-final 1.
- Nepal defeated United Arab Emirates by 8 wickets in the semi-final 2.
- Oman defeated Nepal in the Super Over after the final match was tied.

== East Asia-Pacific qualifier ==
The qualification stages were as follows:

- Qualifier A: Four teams played in double round-robin format for 12 matches from 9 to 15 September 2022 in Vanuatu.
- Qualifier B: Three teams played in double round-robin format for 6 matches from 15 to 18 October 2022 in Japan.
- Regional final: Four teams played in double round-robin format for 12 matches from 22 to 29 July 2023 in Papua New Guinea.

=== EAP sub-regional qualifiers ===
The sub-regional qualifiers were hosted by Vanuatu Cricket Association and Japan Cricket Association. The table-toppers of each sub-regional qualifier (Vanuatu from qualifier A and Japan from qualifier B) advanced to the regional final.

==== EAP qualifier A ====
Pos	Team	Pld	W	L	NR	Pts	NRR	Qualification
1	Vanuatu	6	5	1	0	10	1.228	Advanced to the regional final
2	Fiji	6	3	3	0	6	−0.240	
3	Cook Islands	6	3	3	0	6	−0.929	
4	Samoa	6	1	5	0	2	−0.114	

Source: ESPNcricinfo

==== EAP qualifier B ====
Pos	Team	Pld	W	L	NR	Pts	NRR	Qualification
1	Japan	4	3	1	0	6	2.928	Advanced to the regional final
2	Indonesia	4	3	1	0	6	1.066	
3	South Korea	4	0	4	0	0	−3.965	

Source: ESPNcricinfo

=== EAP regional final ===
Papua New Guinea and Philippines directly qualified for the regional final after receiving a bye due to their participation in the 2022 global qualifiers. The regional final was hosted by Cricket PNG. The table-toppers of the regional final, Papua New Guinea qualified for the T20 World Cup.

Pos	Team	Pld	W	L	NR	Pts	NRR	Qualification
1	Papua New Guinea	6	6	0	0	12	4.189	Qualified for the 2024 Men's T20 World Cup
2	Japan	6	3	3	0	6	0.105	
3	Vanuatu	6	2	4	0	4	−1.170	
4	Philippines	6	1	5	0	2	−2.697	

Source: ESPNcricinfo

== Europe qualifier ==
The qualification stages were as follows:

- Qualifier A: Ten teams divided into two groups of five played in round-robin format followed by playoffs for a total of 24 matches from 12 to 19 July 2022 in Finland.
- Qualifier B: Ten teams divided into two groups of five played in round-robin format followed by playoffs for a total of 24 matches from 24 to 31 July 2022 in Finland.
- Qualifier C: Eight teams divided into two groups of four played in round-robin format followed by playoffs and knockouts for a total of 20 matches from 28 June to 4 July 2022 in Belgium.
- Regional final: Seven teams played in round-robin format for 21 matches from 20 to 28 July 2023 in Scotland.

=== Europe sub-regional qualifiers ===
Two of the sub-regional qualifiers were hosted by Cricket Finland, while the third qualifier was hosted by Belgian Cricket Federation. The winners of each sub-regional qualifier (Italy from qualifier A, Austria from qualifier B and Denmark from qualifier C) advanced to the regional final.

==== Europe qualifier A ====
Group stage

Pos	Team	Pld	W	L	NR	Pts	NRR	Qualification
1	Italy	4	4	0	0	8	4.517	Advanced to the final
2	Finland	4	3	1	0	6	1.008	Advanced to the 3rd place playoff
3	Sweden	4	2	2	0	4	0.848	Advanced to the 5th place playoff
4	Croatia	4	1	3	0	2	−3.733	Advanced to the 7th place playoff
5	Greece	4	0	4	0	0	−2.648	

Source: ESPNcricinfo

Pos	Team	Pld	W	L	NR	Pts	NRR	Qualification
1	Isle of Man	4	4	0	0	8	3.238	Advanced to the final
2	Cyprus	4	2	2	0	4	1.451	Advanced to the 3rd place playoff
3	Romania	4	2	2	0	4	0.136	Advanced to the 5th place playoff
4	Serbia	4	2	2	0	4	−0.826	Advanced to the 7th place playoff
5	Turkey	4	0	4	0	0	−3.754	

Source: ESPNcricinfo

Playoffs

- Croatia defeated Serbia by 7 wickets in the 7th place play-off.
- Sweden defeated Romania by 8 wickets in the 5th place play-off.
- Finland defeated Cyprus by 11 runs in the 3rd place play-off.
- Italy defeated Isle of Man by 7 wickets in the final.

==== Europe qualifier B ====
Group stage

Pos	Team	Pld	W	L	NR	Pts	NRR	Qualification
1	Austria	4	4	0	0	8	4.249	Advanced to the final
2	Guernsey	4	3	1	0	6	2.200	Advanced to the 3rd place playoff
3	Luxembourg	4	2	2	0	4	−0.391	Advanced to the 5th place playoff
4	Bulgaria	4	1	3	0	2	−3.341	Advanced to the 7th place playoff
5	Slovenia	4	0	4	0	0	−3.457	

Source: ESPNcricinfo

Pos	Team	Pld	W	L	NR	Pts	NRR	Qualification
1	Norway	4	3	1	0	6	3.197	Advanced to the final
2	France	4	3	1	0	6	1.132	Advanced to the 3rd place playoff
3	Switzerland	4	2	2	0	4	−0.006	Advanced to the 5th place playoff
4	Czech Republic	4	2	2	0	4	−1.417	Advanced to the 7th place playoff
5	Estonia	4	0	4	0	0	−2.417	

Source: ESPNcricinfo

Playoffs

- Czech Republic defeated Bulgaria by 4 wickets in the 7th place play-off.
- Luxembourg defeated Switzerland by 7 runs in the 5th place play-off.
- Guernsey defeated France by 56 runs in the 3rd place play-off.
- Austria defeated Norway by 9 wickets through DLS method in the final.

==== Europe qualifier C ====
Group stage

Pos	Team	Pld	W	L	NR	Pts	NRR	Qualification
1	Belgium	3	3	0	0	6	1.445	Advanced to the semi-finals
2	Denmark	3	2	1	0	4	3.467	Advanced to the semi-finals
3	Gibraltar	3	1	2	0	2	−3.560	Advanced to the 5th place semi-finals
4	Hungary	3	0	3	0	0	−1.617	Advanced to the 5th place semi-finals

Source: ESPNcricinfo

Pos	Team	Pld	W	L	NR	Pts	NRR	Qualification
1	Spain	3	3	0	0	6	2.682	Advanced to the semi-finals
2	Portugal	3	2	1	0	4	−0.281	Advanced to the semi-finals
3	Malta	3	1	2	0	2	−0.111	Advanced to the 5th place semi-finals
4	Israel	3	0	3	0	0	−1.889	Advanced to the 5th place semi-finals

Source: ESPNcricinfo

Consolation play-offs

- Two 5th place semi-finals were cancelled due to a car accident involving the match officials.
- Israel defeated Hungary by 12 runs in the 7th place play-off.
- Malta defeated Gibraltar by 7 wickets in the 5th place play-off.

Play-offs

- Portugal defeated Belgium by 8 wickets in the semi-final 1.
- Denmark defeated Spain by 41 runs in the semi-final 2.
- Belgium defeated Spain by 5 wickets in the 3rd place play-off.
- Denmark defeated Portugal by 9 wickets in the final.

=== Europe regional final ===
Ireland and Scotland directly qualified for the regional final after receiving a bye due to their participation in the 2022 T20 World Cup. Similarly, Germany and Jersey also received a bye after taking part in the 2022 global qualifiers. The regional final was hosted by Cricket Scotland. The top two sides of the regional final, Scotland and Ireland qualified for the T20 World Cup.

Pos	Team	Pld	W	L	NR	Pts	NRR	Qualification
1	Scotland	6	6	0	0	12	4.110	Qualified for the 2024 Men's T20 World Cup
2	Ireland	6	4	1	1	9	2.716	Qualified for the 2024 Men's T20 World Cup
3	Italy	6	3	2	1	7	−0.965	
4	Jersey	6	3	3	0	6	0.431	
5	Germany	6	2	3	1	5	−0.440	
6	Denmark	6	1	5	0	2	−0.894	
7	Austria	6	0	5	1	1	−5.885	

Source: ESPNcricinfo

== Statistics ==
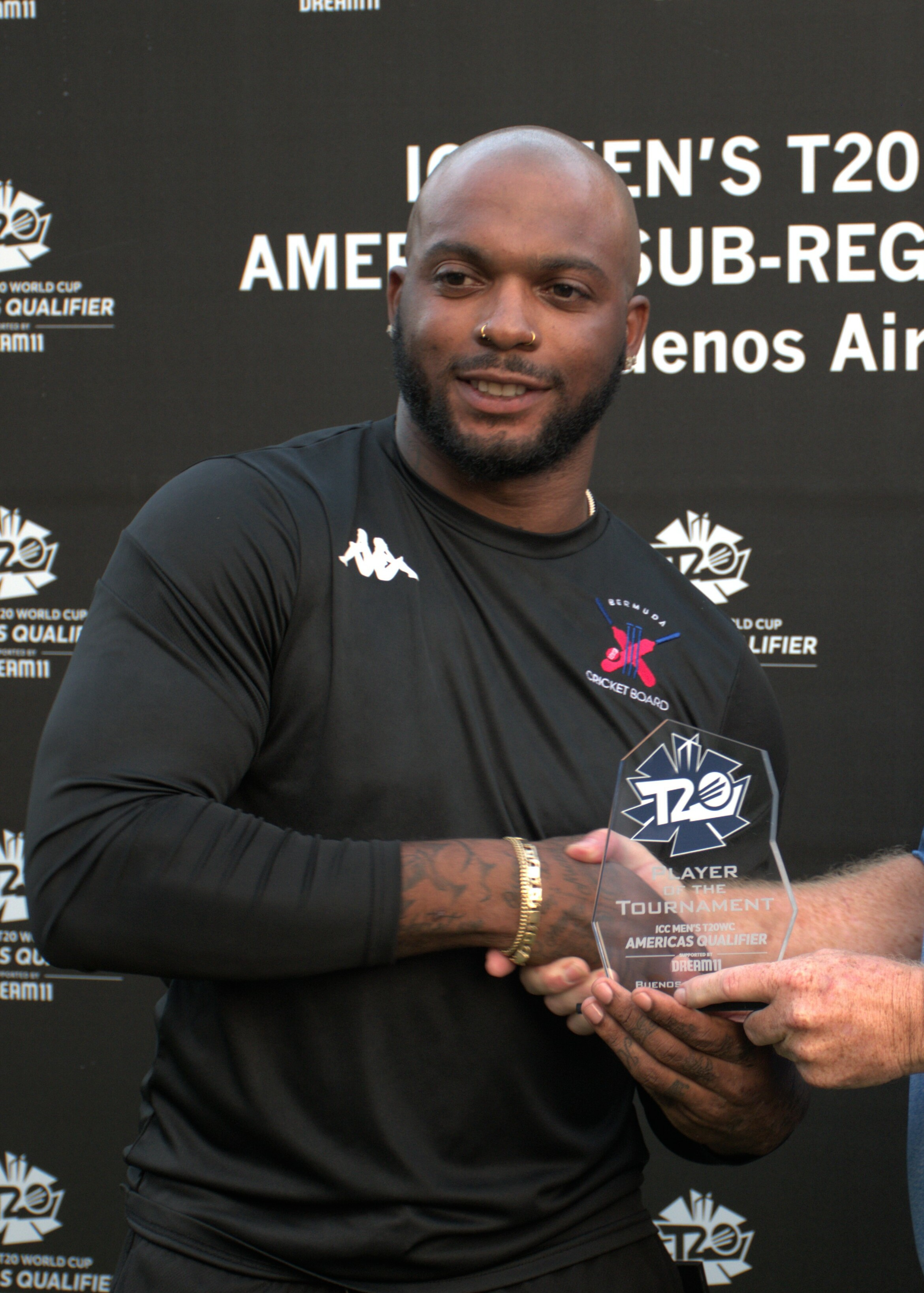
Bermudian cricketer Kamau Leverock scored the most runs (415) throughout the qualifiers.

Most runs
Runs	Player	Team
415	Kamau Leverock	Bermuda
395	Kendel Kadowaki-Fleming	Japan
391	Collins Obuya	Kenya
377	Gustav McKeon	France
317	Taranjit Bharaj	Denmark

Most wickets
Wickets	Player	Team
20	Nicolaj Laegsgaard	Denmark
19	Derrick Brangman	Bermuda
19	Harry Manenti	Italy
18	Yalinde Nkanya	Tanzania
17	Nalin Nipiko	Vanuatu
