= Leverock =

Leverock is a surname. Notable people with the surname include:

- Dante Leverock (born 1992), Bermudian footballer
- Dwayne Leverock (born 1971), Bermudian cricketer
- Kamau Leverock (born 1994), Bermudian cricketer, nephew of Dwayne
