= Gregory Strydom =

Zimbabwean cricketer

Personal information
- Born: 26 March 1984 (age 42)
- Batting: Right-handed
- Bowling: Right-arm medium

International information
- National sides: Zimbabwe (2006); Cayman Islands (2019)
- ODI debut (cap 93): 25 February 2006; Zimbabwe v Kenya
- Last ODI: 13 October 2006; Zimbabwe v Bangladesh
- T20I debut (cap 8): 18 August 2019; Cayman Islands v Canada
- Last T20I: 25 August 2019; Cayman Islands v Bermuda

Career statistics
Competition	ODI	T20I
Matches	12	6
Runs scored	147	97
Batting average	14.70	16.16
100s/50s	0/1	0/0
Top score	58	49
Balls bowled	5	–
Wickets	1	–
Bowling average	61.00	–
5 wickets in innings	0	–
10 wickets in match	0	–
Best bowling	1/28	–
Catches/stumpings	4/–	2/–
- Source: Cricinfo, 25 August 2019

Gregory Mark Strydom (born 26 March 1984) is an international cricketer. He played 12 One Day Internationals (ODIs) for Zimbabwe in 2006, and a number of T20 Internationals (T20Is) for Cayman Islands in 2019.

In 2003–04, playing for Matabeleland, he scored 128 and 104 in a game against Manicaland, an innings which included 16 sixes. Strydom had scored a career best 216 against the same opposition just three weeks earlier. He struggled to succeed in international cricket however, making just one half century in his 12 ODIs for Zimbabwe and failing to score in double figures in seven of them.

== Career with Zimbabwe ==
=== Kenya tour 2005-06 ===
Strydom made his ODI debut in this 5-match ODI tour of Zimbabwe by Kenya. The final result was 2-2 (the final match was rained off) and Strydom made his debut in the first ODI alongside Duffin, Rinke and Meth.

=== West Indies tour 2005-06 ===
Strydom was also picked for the 16-man touring party of Zimbabwe's West Indies tour. Zimbabwe lost the 7-match ODI series 5–0. The highlight of Strydom's tour was his 48 at the 5th match at Gros Islet, St Lucia. Zimbabwe went on to lose by 10 wickets but Strydom's 2nd highest score was the meat of Zimbabwe's 152/10. The best moment was his two successive sixes off Dave Mohammed on Mohammed's ODI debut.

=== Bangladesh series 2006 ===
Strydom was picked for the Zimbabwe squad to play 5 home ODIs against Bangladesh; Zimbabwe won the series 3–2. Strydom's 58 during the 4th ODI was his career best, coming off 58 balls with eight 4s and one 6, helping Zimbabwe to a seven wicket win and secure the series.

=== ICC Champions Trophy 2006-07 ===
Strydom was picked in the 14-man squad for the 2006-07 ICC Champions Trophy in India. He was put in the team for Zimbabwe's 3rd and final game against Bangladesh after defeats by West Indies and Sri Lanka. He only made 4 before he was clean bowled by Mohammad Rafique as Zimbabwe slipped to 130 all out in 44.4 overs, chasing the 231 set by Bangladesh.

=== South Africa tour 2006-07 ===
Strydom was picked in Zimbabwe's 16-man squad for the 3 match ODI and 1 match Twenty20 International tour of South Africa. Zimbabwe lost all the games and Strydom failed to make an impact.

== Move to the Cayman Islands ==
In August 2019, he was named in the Cayman Islands cricket team's T20I squad for the Regional Finals of the 2018–19 ICC T20 World Cup Americas Qualifier tournament. He made his T20I debut for the Cayman Islands against Canada on 18 August 2019. He made his international debut for the team against Canada on 18 August 2019, top scoring for the team with 49. He was the leading run-scorer for the Cayman Islands in the tournament, with 97 runs in six matches.
