= Chad Hauptfleisch =

South African cricketer (born 1988)

Personal information
- Born: 25 January 1988 (age 38)

International information
- National side: Cayman Islands
- T20I debut (cap 3): 18 August 2019 v Canada
- Last T20I: 24 August 2019 v United States
- Source: Cricinfo, 24 August 2019

Chad Hauptfleisch (born 25 January 1988) is a South African cricketer. He played two first-class and two List A matches for KwaZulu-Natal in 2007 and 2008.

In August 2019, he was named in the Cayman Islands cricket team's Twenty20 International (T20I) squad for the Regional Finals of the 2018–19 ICC T20 World Cup Americas Qualifier tournament. He made his T20I debut for the Cayman Islands against Canada on 18 August 2019.
