= Zachary McLaughlin =

Caymanian cricketer (born 1990)

Personal information
- Born: 24 May 1990 (age 36)

International information
- National side: Cayman Islands
- T20I debut (cap 14): 22 August 2019 v Canada
- Last T20I: 25 August 2019 v Bermuda
- Source: Cricinfo, 25 August 2019

Zachary McLaughlin (born 24 May 1990) is a Caymanian cricketer. In August 2019, he was named in the Cayman Islands cricket team's Twenty20 International (T20I) squad for the Regional Finals of the 2018–19 ICC T20 World Cup Americas Qualifier tournament. He made his T20I debut for the Cayman Islands against Canada on 22 August 2019.
