= Darren Cato =

Caymanian cricketer (born 1991)

Personal information
- Born: 3 September 1991 (age 35)

International information
- National side: Cayman Islands
- T20I debut (cap 1): 18 August 2019 v Canada
- Last T20I: 21 August 2019 v Bermuda
- Source: Cricinfo, 21 August 2019

Darren Cato (born 3 September 1991) is a Caymanian cricketer. He played in the 2014 ICC World Cricket League Division Five tournament. In August 2019, he was named in the Cayman Islands cricket team's Twenty20 International (T20I) squad for the Regional Finals of the 2018–19 ICC T20 World Cup Americas Qualifier tournament. He made his T20I debut for the Cayman Islands against Canada on 18 August 2019.
