= Junaid Siddiqui =

Canadian cricketer (born 1985)

Personal information
- Full name: Junaid Siddiqui
- Born: 25 March 1985 (age 41); Karachi, Sindh, Pakistan
- Batting: Right-handed
- Bowling: Legbreak
- Role: All-rounder

International information
- National side: Canada
- ODI debut (cap 75): 7 August 2011 v Afghanistan
- Last ODI: 17 August 2024 v Netherlands
- T20I debut (cap 32): 13 March 2012 v Netherlands
- Last T20I: 11 June 2024 v Pakistan

Career statistics
| Competition | ODI | T20I | FC | LA |
|---|---|---|---|---|
| Matches | 11 | 22 | 2 | 21 |
| Runs scored | 74 | 51 | 50 | 152 |
| Batting average | 10.57 | 10.20 | 16.66 | 10.85 |
| 100s/50s | 0/0 | 0/0 | 0/0 | 0/0 |
| Top score | 25 | 21 | 38 | 25 |
| Balls bowled | 502 | 427 | 140 | 952 |
| Wickets | 5 | 15 | 4 | 15 |
| Bowling average | 74.20 | 26.66 | 35.00 | 44.60 |
| 5 wickets in innings | 0 | 0 | 0 | 0 |
| 10 wickets in match | 0 | 0 | 0 | 0 |
| Best bowling | 1/20 | 3/10 | 3/81 | 3/36 |
| Catches/stumpings | 3/– | 3/– | 1/– | 7/– |
- Source: ESPN Cricinfo, 31 October 2024

Junaid Siddiqui (born 25 March 1985) is a Pakistani-born Canadian cricketer who plays for Canada national cricket team. He debuted in all formats of the game in 2011.

== Personal life ==
Junaid Siddiqui was born on 25 March 1985 in Karachi. His family moved to Toronto when he was thirteen years old. He holds a degree in finance and economics.

Siddiqui also runs businesses to support his passion for cricket. He operates two Timothy's World Coffee franchises in Mississauga and Newmarket, Ontario.

== Career ==
Siddiqui started from school cricket in Mississauga and was a part of Under 14, Under 16, and Under 19 Teams, thus representing cricket locally, domestically as well as on an international level. Siddiqui is one of the few Canadian home grown players who was picked to play first-class and List A games in Sri Lanka prior to being picked for the Canadian national cricket team.

Until 2015, Siddiqui was on the central contract of Cricket Canada after which they discontinued due to lack of funds.

In January 2018, Siddiqui was named in Canada's squad for the 2018 ICC World Cricket League Division Two tournament.

On 3 June 2018, Siddiqui was selected to play for the Winnipeg Hawks in the players' draft for the inaugural edition of the Global T20 Canada tournament. In September 2018, he was named in Canada's squad for the 2018–19 ICC World Twenty20 Americas Qualifier tournament.

In August 2019, Siddiqui was named in Canada's squad for the Regional Finals of the 2018–19 ICC T20 World Cup Americas Qualifier tournament. In October 2019, he was named in Canada's squad for the 2019 ICC T20 World Cup Qualifier tournament in the United Arab Emirates.

In October 2021, Siddiqui was named in Canada's squad for the 2021 ICC Men's T20 World Cup Americas Qualifier tournament in Antigua. In February 2022, he was named in Canada's squad for the 2022 ICC Men's T20 World Cup Global Qualifier A tournament in Oman.

In May 2024, Siddiqui was named in Canada's squad for the 2024 ICC Men's T20 World Cup tournament.
