= Luke Harrington-Myers =

Caymanian cricketer (born 2001)

Personal information
- Born: 4 May 2001 (age 25); Kingston, Surrey, England

International information
- National side: Cayman Islands
- T20I debut (cap 13): 19 August 2019 v United States
- Last T20I: 16 April 2022 v Bahamas
- Source: Cricinfo, 17 April 2022

Luke Harrington-Myers (born 4 May 2001) is a Caymanian cricketer. In August 2019, he was named in the Cayman Islands cricket team's Twenty20 International (T20I) squad for the Regional Finals of the 2018–19 ICC T20 World Cup Americas Qualifier tournament. He made his T20I debut for the Cayman Islands against the United States on 19 August 2019.
