= Akhilesh Gavde =

Caymanian cricketer (born 1987)

Personal information
- Full name: Akhilesh Gavde
- Born: 27 July 1987 (age 39)

International information
- National side: Cayman Islands
- Only T20I (cap 12): 19 August 2019 v United States
- Source: Cricinfo, 19 August 2019

Akhilesh Gavde (born 27 July 1987) is a Caymanian cricketer. In August 2019, he was named in the Cayman Islands cricket team's Twenty20 International (T20I) squad for the Regional Finals of the 2018–19 ICC T20 World Cup Americas Qualifier tournament. He made his T20I debut for the Cayman Islands against the United States on 19 August 2019.
