= Omar Willis =

Caymanian cricketer (born 1986)

Personal information
- Born: 25 May 1986 (age 40)

International information
- National side: Cayman Islands
- T20I debut (cap 10): 18 August 2019 v Canada
- Last T20I: 25 February 2023 v Bermuda
- Source: Cricinfo, 5 March 2023

Omar Willis (born 25 November 1986) is a Caymanian cricketer. He played in the 2014 ICC World Cricket League Division Five tournament. In August 2019, he was named in the Cayman Islands cricket team's Twenty20 International (T20I) squad for the Regional Finals of the 2018–19 ICC T20 World Cup Americas Qualifier tournament. He made his T20I debut for the Cayman Islands against Canada on 18 August 2019.
