= Delray Rawlins =

Bermudian cricketer

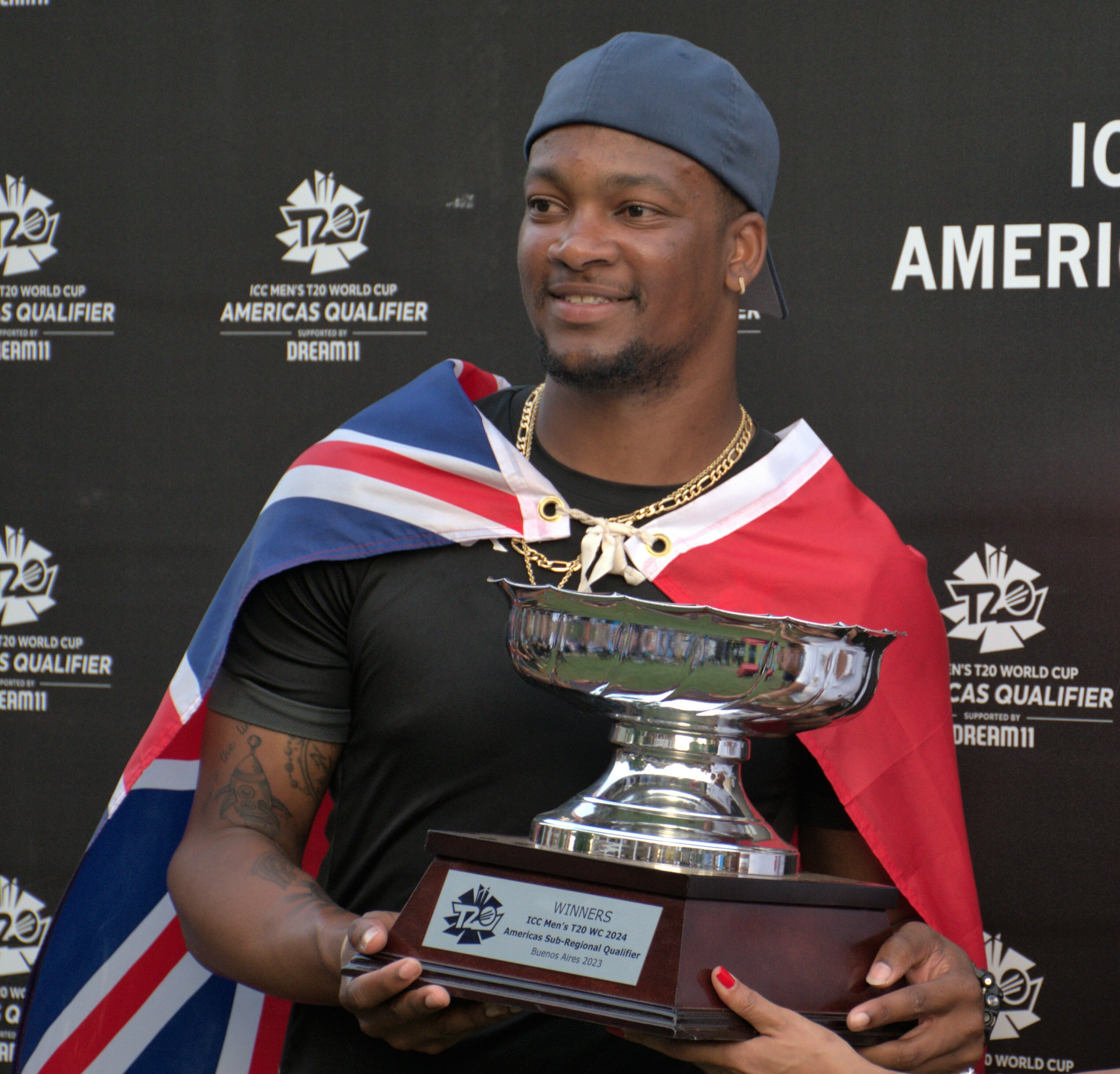

Personal information
- Full name: Delray Millard Wendell Rawlins
- Born: 14 September 1997 (age 29); Bermuda
- Batting: Left-handed
- Bowling: Left-arm orthodox
- Role: All-rounder

International information
- National side: Bermuda (2019-present)
- T20I debut (cap 23): 18 August 2019 v United States
- Last T20I: 7 October 2023 v Canada

Domestic team information
- Years: Team
- 2016–2023: Sussex (squad no. 9)
- 2017: Oxfordshire
- 2018: Marylebone Cricket Club

Career statistics
Competition	T20I	FC	LA	T20
Matches	28	37	22	86
Runs scored	776	1,468	591	1,730
Batting average	35.27	23.30	29.55	26.21
100s/50s	0/6	1/9	0/4	0/9
Top score	91	100	91	91
Balls bowled	588	3,845	893	1,014
Wickets	32	31	20	53
Bowling average	17.71	73.38	37.30	20.77
5 wickets in innings	0	0	0	0
10 wickets in match	0	0	0	0
Best bowling	4/10	3/19	3/22	4/10
Catches/stumpings	22/–	9/–	16/–	47/–
- Source: Cricinfo, 25 February 2024

Delray Millard Wendell Rawlins (born 14 September 1997) is a Bermudian cricketer who captains the Bermuda national cricket team and also played for Sussex in English county cricket.

Rawlins made his senior debut for Bermuda at the age of 15 in 2013. He also played for the England under-19 cricket team, qualifying by attending an English boarding school. On 14 April 2017, he made his first-class cricket debut for Sussex in the 2017 County Championship. On 19 May 2017, he made his List A debut for Sussex during South Africa's tour of England.

== Early life and domestic career ==
Rawlins was born in Bermuda, attending Warwick Academy and playing his junior cricket for Warwick Workmen's Club and Pembroke Hamilton Club. He was inducted into the national youth programme at a young age, where he was coached by former national captain Clay Smith. In 2014, as part of a programme organised by the Bermuda Cricket Board, Rawlins won a scholarship to attend boarding school in England. He subsequently began studying at St Bede's School in East Sussex. Rawlins was inducted into the Sussex Cricket Academy in April 2015, and made his Second XI Championship debut in July 2015. He signed a one-year professional contract in October 2016.

He made his Twenty20 debut for Sussex in the 2018 t20 Blast on 2 August 2018. In the inaugural season of The Hundred, he was signed by the Southern Brave.

== International career ==
=== England U19 ===
In May 2016, Rawlins was included in the England under-19 development programme. He participated in a training camp in Dubai later in the year and in December 2016 was selected in the England under-19s squad for a tour of India in early 2017. In the first international of the tour, against the India under-19s, Rawlins came in sixth in the batting order and scored 107 not out from 88 balls, including eight fours and five sixes. He followed that up with 2/46 from ten overs in India's innings. Two games later, Rawlins scored 96 from 106 balls and took 2/30 from eight overs.

=== Bermuda ===
Rawlins made his senior debut for the Bermuda national team in February 2013 (aged 15), on a tour of Barbados. He was selected for a tour of the United States the following month, and then in May played two matches in the 2013 World Cricket League Division Three tournament (which Bermuda hosted). Later in 2013, Rawlins also represented the Bermuda under-19s at the ICC Americas Under-19 Championship in Canada and the ICC Americas under-20s at a WICB tournament. He returned to the senior team for the 2014 WCL Division Four tournament in Malaysia, playing in all seven of Bermuda's matches. Rawlins has since represented Bermuda at the 2015 ICC Americas Twenty20 and 2016 WCL Division Four events.

In August 2019, he was named in Bermuda's squad for the Regional Finals of the 2018–19 ICC T20 World Cup Americas Qualifier tournament. He made his Twenty20 International (T20I) debut against the United States on 18 August 2019. He was the leading run-scorer for Bermuda in the tournament, with 130 runs in five matches. In September 2019, he was named in Bermuda's squad for the 2019 ICC T20 World Cup Qualifier tournament in the United Arab Emirates. Ahead of the tournament, the International Cricket Council (ICC) named him as the key player in Bermuda's squad. He was the leading run-scorer for Bermuda in the tournament, with 131 runs in six matches. In November 2019, he was named in Bermuda's squad for the Cricket World Cup Challenge League B tournament in Oman.

He was in Bermuda's squad for the 2021 ICC Men's T20 World Cup Americas Qualifier tournament in Antigua and was named Bermuda's captain for the 2023 ICC Men's T20 World Cup Americas Sub-Regional Qualifier.
