= Dilpreet Bajwa =

Canadian international cricketer (born 2003)

Personal information
- Full name: Dilpreet Singh Bajwa
- Born: 26 January 2003 (age 23); Gurudaspur, Punjab, India
- Batting: Right-handed
- Bowling: Right arm Offbreak
- Role: All-rounder

International information
- National side: Canada (2023–present)
- ODI debut (cap 101): 10 February 2024 v Nepal
- Last ODI: 26 September 2024 v Oman
- T20I debut (cap 66): 30 September 2023 v Bermuda
- Last T20I: 19 February 2026 v Afghanistan

Domestic team information
- Years: Team
- 2023: Montreal Tigers

Career statistics
Competition	ODI	T20I
Matches	6	21
Runs scored	74	457
Batting average	14.80	25.38
100s/50s	0/0	0/4
Top score	25	56
Balls bowled	24	78
Wickets	1	2
Bowling average	26.00	60.00
5 wickets in innings	0	0
10 wickets in match	0	0
Best bowling	1/14	1/21
Catches/stumpings	0/–	5/–
- Source: Cricinfo, 31 October 2024

Dilpreet Singh Bajwa (born 26 January 2003) is an Indian cricketer who has played for the Canada national cricket team as an all-rounder. He captained Canada at the 2026 Men's T20 World Cup.

== Early life ==
He was born at Gurdaspur, Punjab in India. He completed his education at Guru Arjun Dev Senior Secondary School in Dhariwal. His father, Harpreet Singh, was employed in the Agriculture Department, while his mother, Harleen Kaur, served as a government teacher.

In 2020, he emigrated to Canada after failing to secure a place in his state team. In 2023 he played Global T20 Canada for Montreal Tigers.

== International career ==
In September 2023, he earned his maiden call-up to the national team for the 2023 ICC Men's T20 World Cup Americas Qualifier. He made his Twenty20 International (T20I) debut on 30 September 2023, for Canada against Bermuda. In February 2024, he was named in ODI squad for the series against Nepal. He made his One Day International (ODI) debut on 10 February 2024, against Nepal.

In May 2024, he was named in Canada's squad for the 2024 Men's T20 World Cup tournament. He was chosen to captain the team at the 2026 tournament.

== Match-fixing and corruption allegations ==
In April 2026, CBC investigative news program The Fifth Estate published a report alleging Cricket Canada had been infiltrated by the Bishnoi Gang, an Indian organised crime organisation, which had facilitated Bajwa's rise to the national captaincy. The International Cricket Council's Anti-Corruption Unit (ACU) had two active investigations concerning alleged breaches of the ICC's anti-corruption code, with one incident under scrutiny relating to Canada's match against the New Zealand national cricket team during the 2026 Men's T20 World Cup. Attention was drawn to an over bowled by Bajwa in which 15 runs were conceded, including a no-ball and a wide delivery. Following publication of the report, the ICC froze funding to Cricket Canada.
