= 2018–19 Men's T20 World Cup Americas qualifier =

Cricket tournament

The 2018–19 ICC Men's T20 World Cup Americas Qualifier was the tournament played as part of qualification process for the 2021 ICC Men's T20 World Cup.

Twelve regional qualifiers were held by the International Cricket Council (ICC), with 62 teams (Note: Zambia were originally scheduled to compete in the Southern sub region group in the Africa Qualifier, but later withdrew.) competing during 2018 in five regions – Africa (3 groups), Americas (2), Asia (2), East Asia Pacific (2) and Europe (3). The top 25 sides from these progressed to five Regional Finals in 2019, with seven teams then going on to compete in the 2019 ICC T20 World Cup Qualifier, (Note: The United Arab Emirates initially qualified to the Asia Regional Final, but later automatically progressed to the qualifier tournament as the host.) along with the six lowest ranked sides from the ICC T20I Championship.

The first sub-regional qualifier was held in Argentina and the other was held in the United States. The top two teams in each group advanced to the regional final tournament, which would determine two American entrants to the 2019 ICC T20 World Cup Qualifier. In April 2018, the International Cricket Council (ICC) granted full international status to Twenty20 men's matches played between member sides from 1 January 2019 onwards. Therefore, all the matches in the Regional Finals will be played as Twenty20 Internationals (T20Is).

From the Southern sub region group, both Bermuda and the Cayman Islands qualified for the Americas Regional Finals. From the Northern sub region, Canada and United States also qualified for the Americas Regional Finals.

The Regional Finals were held in Bermuda from 18 to 25 August 2019. Following the conclusion of matches that took place on 22 August 2019, Canada and Bermuda had both progressed to the T20 World Cup Qualifier.

== Teams ==
Southern Sub-regional Group	Northern Sub-regional Group
Argentina; Bermuda; Cayman Islands	Belize; Canada; Panama; United States

== Southern sub-region ==
2018 ICC Men's T20 World Cup Americas Southern Sub-regional Qualifier
- Dates: 26 February 2018 – 3 March 2018
- Administrator: ICC Americas
- Cricket format: 20 overs
- Tournament format: Double round-robin
- Host: Argentina
- Champions: Bermuda
- Runners-up: Cayman Islands
- Participants: 3
- Matches: 6
- Most runs: (Bermuda) Kamau Leverock (171)
- Most wickets: (Cayman Islands) Alessandro Morris (8)

The Southern sub region group was held in Argentina from 26 February to 3 March 2018.

=== Points table ===
Team	Pld	W	L	T	NR	Pts	NRR	Status
Bermuda (Q)	4	3	1	0	0	6	+1.690	Advance to Regional Finals
Cayman Islands (Q)	4	3	1	0	0	6	+1.573	Advance to Regional Finals
Argentina (H)	4	0	4	0	0	0	–3.283	

(H) Host, (Q) Qualified to next stage

=== Fixtures ===
26 February 2018
15:00
Scorecard

Argentina; 88 (19.3 overs)	v	Cayman Islands; 91/5 (17 overs)
Pedro Arrighi 34 (40); Troy Taylor 3/14 (4 overs)		Ramon Sealy 28 (33); Lautaro Musiani 2/15 (3 overs)

Cayman Islands won by 5 wickets
Hurlingham Club Ground, Hurlingham
Umpires: Emmerson Carrington (Ber) and Courtney Young (Cay)

- Argentina won the toss and elected to bat.

27 February 2018
15:00
Scorecard

Bermuda; 209/7 (20 overs)	v	Argentina; 85/6 (20 overs)
Kamau Leverock 93 (51); Samuel Hatt 3/46 (4 overs)		Pedro Arrighi 42 (50); Kwaisi James 2/8 (4 overs)

Bermuda won by 124 runs
Estadio Belgrano Athletic, Buenos Aires
Umpires: Andrew Elliott (Eng) and Courtney Young (Cay)

- Bermuda won the toss and elected to bat.

28 February 2018
15:00
Scorecard

Cayman Islands; 165/5 (20 overs)	v	Bermuda; 103 (18.4 overs)
Troy Taylor 35 (18); Kamau Leverock 1/14 (4 overs)		Kamau Leverock 22 (18); Alessandro Morris 4/21 (4 overs)

Cayman Islands won by 62 runs
Hurlingham Club Ground, Hurlingham
Umpires: Emmerson Carrington (Ber) and Andrew Elliott (Eng)

- Cayman Islands won the toss and elected to bat.

1 March 2018
15:00
Scorecard

Cayman Islands; 143/6 (20 overs)	v	Argentina; 100/8 (20 overs)
Omar Willis 51 (52); David Mauro 2/22 (4 overs)		Santiago Rossi 30 (19); Adrian Wright 4/11 (4 overs)

Cayman Islands won by 43 runs
Estadio Belgrano Athletic, Buenos Aires
Umpires: Andrew Elliott (Eng) and Martín Siri (Arg)

- Cayman Islands won the toss and elected to bat.

2 March 2018
15:00
Scorecard

Bermuda; 139/5 (20 overs)	v	Argentina; 69 (18.2 overs)
Terryn Fray 40 (37); Santiago Rossi 1/20 (4 overs)		Santiago Rossi 24 (13); Curt Stovell 2/4 (4 overs)

Bermuda won by 70 runs
Hurlingham Club Ground, Hurlingham

- Bermuda won the toss and elected to bat.

3 March 2018
15:00
Scorecard

Cayman Islands; 134/7 (20 overs)	v	Bermuda; 136/6 (19.5 overs)
Ramon Sealy 26* (21); Cejay Outerbridge 2/19 (4 overs)		Kamau Leverock 31 (30); Adrian Wright 2/16 (3 overs)

Bermuda won by 4 wickets
Estadio Belgrano Athletic, Buenos Aires
Umpires: Andrew Elliott (Eng) and Courtney Young (Cay)

- Cayman Islands won the toss and elected to bat.

== Northern sub-region ==
2018 ICC Men's T20 World Cup Americas Northern Sub-regional Qualifier
- Dates: 20 September 2018 – 26 September 2018
- Administrator: ICC Americas
- Cricket format: 20 overs
- Tournament format: Double round-robin
- Host: United States
- Champions: United States
- Runners-up: Canada
- Participants: 4
- Matches: 12
- Most runs: (United States) Monank Patel (208)
- Most wickets: (United States) Nosthush Kenjige (12)

The Northern sub region was held in the United States from 20 to 26 September 2018. Originally, the sub region matches were scheduled to start on 19 September, but were postponed by one day because of Hurricane Florence.

=== Points table ===
Team	Pld	W	L	T	NR	Pts	NRR	Status
United States (H,Q)	6	5	1	0	0	10	+5.384	Advance to Regional Finals
Canada (Q)	6	5	1	0	0	10	+5.261	Advance to Regional Finals
Panama	6	1	5	0	0	2	–4.164	
Belize	6	1	5	0	0	2	–5.344	

(H) Host, (Q) Qualified to next stage

=== Fixtures ===
20 September 2018
11:00
Scorecard

Panama; 65/8 (20 overs)	v	United States; 67/0 (5.2 overs)
Imran Bulbulia 25 (27); Timil Patel 2/4 (2 overs)		Monank Patel 45* (21)

United States won by 10 wickets
Church Street Park, Morrisville
Umpires: Roger Dill (Ber) and Arnold Maddela (Can)
Player of the match: Monank Patel (USA)

- Panama won the toss and elected to bat.

20 September 2018
16:00
Scorecard

Belize; 42 (14.3 overs)	v	Canada; 43/0 (3 overs)
Dirk Sutherland 10* (14); Nitish Kumar 3/1 (1 over)		Navneet Dhaliwal 20* (7)

Canada won by 10 wickets
Church Street Park, Morrisville
Umpires: Sameer Bandekar (USA) and Harry Grewal (Can)
Player of the match: Nitish Kumar (Can)

- Belize won the toss and elected to bat.

21 September 2018
11:00
Scorecard

Panama; 42 (18.5 overs)	v	Canada; 46/0 (4 overs)
Mitulkumar Patel 16 (30); Nitish Kumar 3/8 (2.5 overs)		Hamza Tariq 27* (13)

Canada won by 10 wickets
Church Street Park, Morrisville
Umpires: Harry Grewal (Can) and Arnold Maddela (Can)
Player of the match: Nitish Kumar (Can)

- Panama won the toss and elected to bat.

21 September 2018
16:00
Scorecard

United States; 249/2 (20 overs)	v	Belize; 51 (12.3 overs)
Monank Patel 108 (58); Herbert Banner 2/45 (4 overs)		Francis Sutherland 17 (17); Nosthush Kenjige 4/5 (2.3 overs)

United States won by 198 runs
Church Street Park, Morrisville
Umpires: Sameer Bandekar (USA) and Roger Dill (Ber)
Player of the match: Jaskaran Malhotra (USA)

- United States won the toss and elected to bat.

22 September 2018
11:00
Scorecard

Belize; 104/5 (20 overs)	v	Panama; 92 (17.4 overs)
Aaron Muslar 30 (41); Irfan Hafejee 1/12 (4 overs)		Mahmud Jasat 16 (15); Francis Sutherland 3/27 (4 overs)

Belize won by 12 runs
Church Street Park, Morrisville
Umpires: Harry Grewal (Can) and Arnold Maddela (Can)
Player of the match: Francis Sutherland (Blz)

- Belize won the toss and elected to bat.

22 September 2018
16:00
Scorecard

United States; 140/8 (20 overs)	v	Canada; 140/8 (20 overs)
Sunny Sohal 38 (39); Nitish Kumar 3/6 (2 overs)		Rizwan Cheema 32* (25); Steven Taylor 2/2 (1 over)

Match tied
(Canada won the Super Over)
Church Street Park, Morrisville
Umpires: Sameer Bandekar (USA) and Roger Dill (Ber)
Player of the match: Rizwan Cheema (Can)

- United States won the toss and elected to bat.

23 September 2018
11:00
Scorecard

Belize; 32 (10.2 overs)	v	Canada; 33/0 (2.4 overs)
Herbert Banner 10 (4); Abraash Khan 3/4 (2 overs)		Ravinderpal Singh 18* (8)

Canada won by 10 wickets
Church Street Park, Morrisville
Umpires: Sameer Bandekar (USA) and Harry Grewal (Can)
Player of the match: Abraash Khan (Can)

- Canada won the toss and elected to field.

23 September 2018
16:00
Scorecard

Panama; 94/8 (20 overs)	v	United States; 98/2 (7.5 overs)
Irfan Hafejee 25 (25); Nosthush Kenjige 3/19 (4 overs)		Monank Patel 46 (24); Aslam Doria 1/15 (0.5 overs)

United States won by 8 wickets
Church Street Park, Morrisville
Umpires: Roger Dill (Ber) and Arnold Maddela (Can)
Player of the match: Sunny Sohal (USA)

- Panama won the toss and elected to bat.

25 September 2018
11:00
Scorecard

Panama; 128/6 (20 overs)	v	Belize; 119/9 (20 overs)
Soyeb Chohan 51* (24); Kenroy Roca 2/16 (3 overs)		Aaron Muslar 28 (35); Khengar Ratilal 4/10 (4 overs)

Panama won by 9 runs
Church Street Park, Morrisville
Umpires: Sameer Bandekar (USA) and Arnold Maddela (Can)
Player of the match: Soyeb Chohan (Pan)

- Panama won the toss and elected to bat.

25 September 2018
16:00
Scorecard

Canada; 173/8 (20 overs)	v	United States; 174/8 (19.5 overs)
Hamza Tariq 31 (17); Nosthush Kenjige 3/44 (4 overs)		Steven Taylor 96* (54); Cecil Pervez 2/29 (4 overs)

United States won by 2 wickets
Church Street Park, Morrisville
Umpires: Roger Dill (Ber) and Harry Grewal (Can)
Player of the match: Steven Taylor (USA)

- Canada won the toss and elected to bat.

26 September 2018
11:00
Scorecard

Belize; 84 (20 overs)	v	United States; 90/1 (5.2 overs)
Francis Sutherland 20* (24); Usman Ashraf 5/15 (4 overs)		Steven Taylor 57* (19); Jonathan Benjamin 1/16 (1.2 overs)

United States won by 9 wickets
Church Street Park, Morrisville
Umpires: Roger Dill (Ber) and Arnold Maddela (Can)
Player of the match: Usman Ashraf (USA)

- Belize won the toss and elected to bat.

26 September 2018
16:00
Scorecard

Panama; 40 (16.4 overs)	v	Canada; 41/0 (2.1 overs)
Aslam Doria 12 (19); Cecil Pervez 3/10 (4 overs)		Rizwan Cheema 23* (9)

Canada won by 10 wickets
Church Street Park, Morrisville
Umpires: Sameer Bandekar (USA) and Harry Grewal (Can)
Player of the match: Cecil Pervez (Can)

- Panama won the toss and elected to bat.

== Regional Finals ==
2018 ICC Men's T20 World Cup Americas Regional Final
- Dates: 18 – 25 August 2019
- Administrator: ICC Americas
- Cricket format: Twenty20 International
- Tournament format: Double round-robin
- Host: Bermuda
- Champions: Canada
- Runners-up: Bermuda
- Participants: 4
- Matches: 12
- Most runs: (Canada) Navneet Dhaliwal (190)
- Most wickets: (Canada) Dillon Heyliger (11)

The Regional Finals were held in Bermuda from 18 to 25 August 2019, with the matches played at the Bermuda National Stadium and White Hill Field. On 21 August 2019, the Bermuda Cricket Board confirmed that all the remaining matches scheduled to be played at the Bermuda National Stadium would be moved to White Hill Field, due to the condition of the pitch. Canada won the Regional Finals to progress to the 2019 ICC T20 World Cup Qualifier. They were joined by Bermuda, who finished in second place.

Qualified Teams
Southern sub-region	Bermuda
Southern sub-region	Cayman Islands
Northern sub-region	United States
Northern sub-region	Canada

=== Points table ===
Team	P	W	L	T	NR	Pts	NRR	Status
Canada (Q)	6	5	0	0	1	11	+2.417	Qualify to 2019 ICC T20 World Cup Qualifier
Bermuda (H, Q)	6	4	1	0	1	9	+0.240	Qualify to 2019 ICC T20 World Cup Qualifier
United States	6	2	4	0	0	4	+0.419	
Cayman Islands	6	0	6	0	0	0	–2.591	

(H) Host, (Q) Qualified

=== Fixtures ===
18 August 2019
11:00
Scorecard

Bermuda; 141/7 (20 overs)	v	United States; 135/7 (20 overs)
Delray Rawlins 63 (53); Cameron Gannon 2/21 (4 overs)		Aaron Jones 39 (29); George O'Brien 2/14 (4 overs)

Bermuda won by 6 runs
White Hill Field, Sandys Parish
Umpires: Nigel Duguid (WI) and Harry Grewal (Can)
Player of the match: Delray Rawlins (Ber)

- Bermuda won the toss and elected to bat.
- Okera Bascome, Onias Bascome, Deunte Darrell, Allan Douglas, Terryn Fray, Malachi Jones, Kamau Leverock, Justin Pitcher, Delray Rawlins (Ber), Timroy Allen, Cameron Gannon and Nisarg Patel (USA) all made their T20I debuts.

18 August 2019
15:30
Scorecard

Canada; 196/6 (20 overs)	v	Cayman Islands; 112/7 (20 overs)
Ravinderpal Singh 101 (48); Paul Manning 2/3 (1 over)		Gregory Strydom 49 (34); Romesh Eranga 3/19 (4 overs)

Canada won by 84 runs
White Hill Field, Sandys Parish
Umpires: Emmerson Carrington (Ber) and Jacqueline Williams (WI)
Player of the match: Ravinderpal Singh (Can)

- Canada won the toss and elected to bat.
- Navneet Dhaliwal, Nikhil Dutta, Romesh Eranga, Dillon Heyliger, Ravinderpal Singh, Rodrigo Thomas, Saad Bin Zafar (Can), Darren Cato, Sacha De Alwis, Kervin Ebanks, Chad Hauptfleisch, Alistair Ifill, Paul Manning, Alessandro Morris, Gregory Strydom, Troy Taylor, Omar Willis and Conroy Wright (Cay) all made their T20I debuts.
- Ravinderpal Singh became the first batsman for Canada to score a century in T20Is and the first player to score a century on his T20I debut.
- Belize played their first men's T20I match.

19 August 2019
11:00
Scorecard

Bermuda; 82/9 (16 overs)	v	Canada; 40/0 (4 overs)
Okera Bascombe 23 (29); Dillon Heyliger 4/16 (3 overs)		Rizwan Cheema 25* (10)

No result
Bermuda National Stadium, Hamilton
Umpires: Nigel Duguid (WI) and Jacqueline Williams (WI)

- Bermuda won the toss and elected to bat.
- Rain during Canada's innings prevented any further play.
- Derrick Brangman (Ber) and Abraash Khan (Can) both made their T20I debuts.

19 August 2019
15:30
Scorecard

Cayman Islands; 68/8 (20 overs)	v	United States; 60/5 (15 overs)
Luke Harrington-Myers 17* (18); Timil Patel 2/9 (4 overs)		Steven Taylor 17 (22); Luke Harrington-Myers 2/13 (3 overs)

United States won by 10 runs (DLS method)
Bermuda National Stadium, Hamilton
Umpires: Emmerson Carrington (Ber) and Harry Grewal (Can)
Player of the match: Luke Harrington-Myers (Cay)

- United States won the toss and elected to field.
- United States were set a revised target of 51 runs from 15 overs.
- Akhilesh Gavde and Luke Harrington-Myers (Cay) both made their T20I debuts.

21 August 2019
11:00
Scorecard

Cayman Islands; 116/9 (20 overs)	v	Bermuda; 117/4 (15.2 overs)
Chad Hauptfleisch 42 (39); Onias Bascome 4/10 (3 overs)		Delray Rawlins 49 (31); Alessandro Morris 2/17 (4 overs)

Bermuda won by 6 wickets
White Hill Field, Sandys Parish
Umpires: Harry Grewal (Can) and Jacqueline Williams (WI)
Player of the match: Onias Bascome (Ber)

- Cayman Islands won the toss and elected to bat.

21 August 2019
15:30
Scorecard

United States; 144/6 (20 overs)	v	Canada; 145/6 (19.1 overs)
Steven Taylor 38 (31); Nikhil Dutta 2/26 (4 overs)		Navneet Dhaliwal 54 (41); Timil Patel 4/27 (4 overs)

Canada won by 4 wickets
White Hill Field, Sandys Parish
Umpires: Emmerson Carrington (Ber) and Nigel Duguid (WI)
Player of the match: Navneet Dhaliwal (Can)

- United States won the toss and elected to bat.
- Karima Gore (USA) made his T20I debut.

22 August 2019
11:00
Scorecard

Cayman Islands; 91/7 (20 overs)	v	Canada; 95/2 (12.1 overs)
Gregory Strydom 23 (32); Saad Bin Zafar 3/8 (4 overs)		Navneet Dhaliwal 53* (34); Alessandro Morris 1/15 (4 overs)

Canada won by 8 wickets
White Hill Field, Sandys Parish
Umpires: Emmerson Carrington (Ber) and Nigel Duguid (WI)
Player of the match: Navneet Dhaliwal (Can)

- Canada won the toss and elected to field.
- Zachary McLaughlin (Cay) made his T20I debut.

22 August 2019
15:30
Scorecard

United States; 141/9 (20 overs)	v	Bermuda; 142/6 (18.5 overs)
Hayden Walsh Jr. 26 (28); Onias Bascome 3/32 (4 overs)		Okera Bascome 35 (16); Karima Gore 3/5 (4 overs)

Bermuda won by 4 wickets
White Hill Field, Sandys Parish
Umpires: Harry Grewal (Can) and Jacqueline Williams (WI)
Player of the match: Deunte Darrell (Ber)

- Bermuda won the toss and elected to field.
- Sinclair Smith (Ber) and Sunny Sohal (USA) both made their T20I debuts.

24 August 2019
11:00
Scorecard

Cayman Islands; 66/9 (20 overs)	v	United States; 70/1 (9.4 overs)
Troy Taylor 19 (28); Nisarg Patel 2/8 (4 overs)		Steven Taylor 56* (39); Alessandro Morris 1/12 (2 overs)

United States won by 9 wickets
White Hill Field, Sandys Parish
Umpires: Emmerson Carrington (Ber) and Harry Grewal (Can)
Player of the match: Steven Taylor (USA)

- Cayman Islands won the toss and elected to bat.

24 August 2019
15:30
Scorecard

Bermuda; 116 (19.5 overs)	v	Canada; 120/2 (13.1 overs)
Kamau Leverock 33 (34); Dillon Heyliger 4/19 (4 overs)		Rizwan Cheema 71 (34); Delray Rawlins 1/15 (3 overs)

Canada won by 8 wickets
White Hill Field, Sandys Parish
Umpires: Nigel Duguid (WI) and Jacqueline Williams (WI)
Player of the match: Rizwan Cheema (Can)

- Bermuda won the toss and elected to bat.
- Macai Simmons (Ber) made his T20I debut.

25 August 2019
11:00
Scorecard

Canada; 173/8 (20 overs)	v	United States; 158/8 (20 overs)
Ravinderpal Singh 67 (33); Karima Gore 3/21 (4 overs)		Jasdeep Singh 31 (24); Saad Bin Zafar 3/34 (4 overs)

Canada won by 15 runs
White Hill Field, Sandys Parish
Umpires: Emmerson Carrington (Ber) and Jacqueline Williams (WI)
Player of the match: Ravinderpal Singh (Can)

- United States won the toss and elected to field.
- Mark Montfort and Harsh Thaker (Can) both made their T20I debuts.

25 August 2019
15:30
Scorecard

Cayman Islands; 114 (19.2 overs)	v	Bermuda; 115/4 (16.3 overs)
Paul Manning 28 (32); Allan Douglas 5/18 (2.2 overs)		Allan Douglas 47* (28); Zachary McLaughlin 2/30 (4 overs)

Bermuda won by 6 wickets
White Hill Field, Sandys Parish
Umpires: Nigel Duguid (WI) and Harry Grewal (Can)
Player of the match: Allan Douglas (Ber)

- Cayman Islands won the toss and elected to bat.
- Dion Stovell (Ber) made his T20I debut.
- Allan Douglas became the first bowler for Bermuda to take a five-wicket haul in T20Is.
