= List of Cayman Islands Twenty20 International cricketers =

This is a list of Cayman Islands Twenty20 International cricketers

In April 2018, the ICC decided to grant full Twenty20 International (T20I) status to all its members. Therefore, all Twenty20 matches played between Cayman Islands and other ICC members after 1 January 2019 will be eligible for T20I status. The Cayman Islands will play their first matches with T20I status during the Americas Regional Qualifier Finals in August 2019.

This list comprises all members of the Cayman Islands cricket team who have played at least one T20I match. It is initially arranged in the order in which each player won his first Twenty20 cap. Where more than one player won his first Twenty20 cap in the same match, those players are listed alphabetically by surname.

== Key ==
General

- ‡ – Captain
- † – Wicket-keeper
- First – Year of debut
- Last – Year of latest game
- Mat – Number of matches played

Batting

- Runs – Runs scored in career
- HS – Highest score
- Avg – Runs scored per dismissal
- * – Batsman remained not out
- 50 – Half-centuries scored
- 100 – Centuries scored

Bowling

- Balls – Balls bowled in career
- Wkt – Wickets taken in career
- BBI – Best bowling in an innings
- Ave – Average runs per wicket

Fielding

- Ca – Catches taken
- St – Stumpings affected

== List of players ==
Statistics are correct as of 15 March 2026.

Cayman Islands T20I cricketers
General					Batting					Bowling				Fielding		Ref
No.	Name	First	Last	Mat	Runs	HS	Avg	50	100	Balls	Wkt	BBI	Ave	Ca	St	Ref
1	Darren Cato	2019	2019	3	30	20	10.00	0	0	–	–	–	–	0	0	
2	Kervin Ebanks	2019	2025	8	20	8	2.85	0	0	114	3	2/32	59.00	1	0	
3	Chad Hauptsfliech†	2019	2019	5	69	42	13.80	0	0	–	–	–	–	1	1	
4	Alistair Ifill	2019	2026	31	109	25	8.38	0	0	616	36	4/8	17.19	8	0	
5	Paul Manning	2019	2023	13	138	31	12.54	0	0	102	5	2/3	26.00	4	0	
6	Alessandro Morris‡	2019	2025	27	30	8*	7.50	0	0	582	35	4/7	16.22	2	0	
7	Sacha De Alwis	2019	2026	29	766	150*	34.81	3	1	18	0	–	–	9	0	
8	Gregory Strydom	2019	2019	6	97	49	16.16	0	0	–	–	–	–	2	0	
9	Troy Taylor	2019	2025	25	153	42	12.75	0	0	427	25	4/43	20.12	6	0	
10	Omar Willis†	2019	2023	8	34	15	4.85	0	0	–	–	–	–	1	1	
11	Conroy Wright‡	2019	2026	44	242	50	14.23	1	0	701	39	4/29	19.79	16	0	
12	Akhilesh Gavde	2019	2019	1	1	1	1.00	0	0	–	–	–	–	0	0	
13	Luke Harrington-Myers	2019	2022	9	75	22	15.00	0	0	48	3	2/13	22.66	2	0	
14	Zachary McLaughlin	2019	2019	3	4	4*	–	0	0	43	2	2/30	27.00	0	0	
15	Kevon Bazil	2022	2025	14	13	7	3.25	0	0	257	13	2/9	22.07	2	0	
16	Paul Chin†	2022	2023	9	38	27	9.50	0	0	–	–	–	–	2	0	
17	Patrick Heron	2022	2023	11	205	59	22.77	2	0	6	1	1/8	8.00	5	0	
18	Jalon Linton	2022	2022	3	69	40	23.00	0	0	–	–	–	–	0	0	
19	Ramon Sealy‡†	2022	2026	40	673	73*	21.03	3	0	6	1	1/3	3.00	22	3	
20	Marvin Swack	2022	2022	4	–	–	–	–	–	78	3	2/12	26.00	0	0	
21	Demar Johnson	2022	2026	14	78	44	13.00	0	0	222	9	2/13	33.22	11	0	
22	Gregory Smith	2022	2022	3	–	–	–	–	–	48	3	2/18	18.00	0	0	
23	Thilina Hewa	2023	2023	3	0	0*	0.00	0	0	18	0	–	–	2	0	
24	Adrian Wright	2023	2026	27	13	6	2.60	0	0	543	29	4/14	16.17	6	0	
25	Jahmeal Buchanan	2023	2026	8	11	10	5.50	0	0	150	6	2/13	26.00	0	0	
26	Brian Corbin	2023	2025	15	175	34	14.58	0	0	–	–	–	–	1	0	
27	Romeo Dunka	2023	2026	25	143	35	10.21	0	0	450	21	3/23	28.52	4	0	
28	Akshay Naidoo	2023	2026	29	545	53*	24.77	1	0	18	0	–	–	5	0	
29	Mohan Manivannan	2023	2023	1	4	4*	–	0	0	18	0	–	–	0	0	
30	Jermaine Baker†	2024	2026	28	1031	94	42.95	10	0	42	3	3/33	21.66	8	4	
31	Sam Foster	2024	2026	24	243	41	17.35	0	0	36	0	–	–	7	0	
32	Rickel Walker	2024	2025	13	88	33	11.00	0	0	–	–	–	–	2	0	
33	Ronald Ebanks	2024	2024	6	2	2	0.66	0	0	144	10	3/16	11.40	1	0	
34	Davion Codner	2025	2026	7	18	9	4.50	0	0	42	2	1/14	31.50	3	0	
35	Romario Edwards	2025	2026	10	8	8*	4.00	0	0	198	15	5/16	13.00	1	0	
36	Karthik Jayaraj	2025	2025	1	–	–	–	–	–	18	0	–	–	0	0	
37	Anubhav Dhar	2025	2025	3	2	2	2.00	0	0	18	0	–	–	0	0	
38	Sunil	2025	2025	1	8	8*	–	0	0	–	–	–	–	0	0	
39	Vick Dhaniram	2026	2026	6	6	6*	–	0	0	132	6	2/8	15.16	2	0	
