= Anop Santosh =

Pakistani cricketer

Personal information
- Full name: Anop Ravi Santosh Kumar
- Born: 23 June 1991 (age 35); Karachi, Sindh, Pakistan
- Batting: Right-handed
- Role: Wicket-keeper-batter

International information
- National side: Canada
- Only ODI (cap 114): 25 May 2025 v United States

Domestic team information
- Years: Team
- Pakistan International Airlines

Career statistics
Competition	First-class	List A	ODI
Matches	31	16	1
Runs scored	833	184	2
Batting average	19.37	15.33	2.00
100s/50s	1/4	0/1	0/0
Top score	105*	50	2
Balls bowled	–	–	–
Wickets	–	–	–
Bowling average	–	–	–
5 wickets in innings	–	–	–
10 wickets in match	–	–	–
Best bowling	–	–	–
Catches/stumpings	85/6	19/3	2/–
- Source: Cricinfo, 1 May 2026

Anop Santosh (born 23 June 1991) is a Pakistani-born cricketer who has represented Canada in One Day International cricket. A right-handed wicket-keeper-batter, he was born in Karachi, Sindh, and previously played domestic cricket in Pakistan for Pakistan International Airlines.

Santosh made his first-class debut for Pakistan International Airlines against Khan Research Laboratories in the 2007–08 Quaid-e-Azam Trophy in October 2007. He had already played seven first-class matches when he was named in Pakistan's squad for the 2010 Under-19 Cricket World Cup in New Zealand. Pakistan finished as runners-up in the tournament after losing the final to Australia by 25 runs.

His highest first-class score came in November 2010, when he made an unbeaten 105 against Sialkot for Pakistan International Airlines in the 2010–11 Quaid-e-Azam Trophy. In the same match he also scored 42 not out in the second innings. His only fifty in List A cricket came in January 2014, when he scored 50 against Port Qasim Authority in the President's Cup One-Day Tournament.

In May 2025, Santosh was named in Canada's squad for the ICC Men's Cricket World Cup League 2 matches in the United States. He made his ODI debut against the United States at Central Broward Regional Park on 25 May 2025, scoring 2 runs and taking two catches.
