= Ravinderpal Singh =

Canadian cricketer (born 1988)

Personal information
- Full name: Ravinderpal Singh
- Born: 14 October 1988 (age 38); Canada
- Batting: Right-handed
- Role: Batsman

International information
- National side: Canada
- ODI debut (cap 90): 27 March 2023 v Jersey
- Last ODI: 17 August 2024 v Netherlands
- T20I debut (cap 46): 18 August 2019 v Cayman Islands
- Last T20I: 3 October 2024 v Oman

Domestic team information
- Years: Team
- 2018: Vancouver Knights
- 2019: Toronto Nationals
- 2019: Swift Gallopers
- 2020: Colombo Kings
- 2021: Bangla Tigers
- Source: Cricinfo, 31 October 2024

Ravinderpal Singh (born 14 October 1988) is a Canadian cricketer. He is a right-handed batsman.

== Career ==
In April 2019, Singh was named in Canada's squad for the 2019 ICC World Cricket League Division Two tournament in Namibia. He made his List A debut for Canada against Papua New Guinea in the 2019 ICC World Cricket League Division Two tournament on 24 April 2019. Prior to his List A debut, he was named in Canada's squad for the 2018–19 ICC T20 World Cup Americas Qualifier tournament in Morrisville, North Carolina.

In June 2019, he was selected to play for the Toronto Nationals franchise team in the 2019 Global T20 Canada tournament.

He was in Canada's squad for the Regional Finals of the 2018–19 ICC T20 World Cup Americas Qualifier tournament. He made his Twenty20 International (T20I) debut for Canada against the Cayman Islands on 18 August 2019. On debut he scored 101 runs from 48 balls to become the first batsman for Canada to score a century in a T20I match. He was also the first cricketer to score a century on his T20I debut.

In September 2019, he was named in Canada's squad for the 2019 Malaysia Cricket World Cup Challenge League A tournament. In October 2019, he was named in Canada's squad for the 2019 ICC T20 World Cup Qualifier tournament in the United Arab Emirates.

In October 2020, he was drafted by the Colombo Kings for the inaugural edition of the Lanka Premier League. In October 2021, he was named in Canada's squad for the 2021 ICC Men's T20 World Cup Americas Qualifier tournament in Antigua. In February 2022, he was named in Canada's squad for the 2022 ICC Men's T20 World Cup Global Qualifier A tournament in Oman.

In March 2023, he was named in Canada's squad for the 2023 Cricket World Cup Qualifier Play-off. He made his One Day International (ODI) debut on 27 March 2023, for Canada, against Jersey in that tournament.

In May 2024, he was named in Canada’s squad for the 2024 ICC Men's T20 World Cup tournament.
