= Nikhil Dutta =

Canadian cricketer

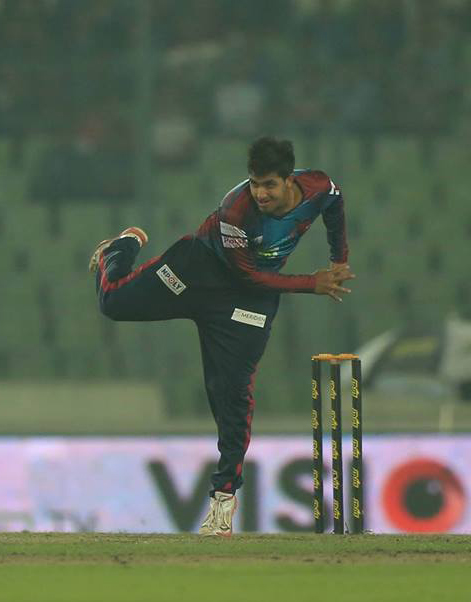

Personal information
- Full name: Nikhil Dutta
- Born: 13 October 1994 (age 32); Kuwait City, Kuwait
- Batting: Right-handed
- Bowling: Right-arm off spin
- Role: Bowler

International information
- National side: Canada (2013–present)
- ODI debut (cap 82): 11 March 2013 v Kenya
- Last ODI: 29 March 2023 v United States
- T20I debut (cap 43): 18 August 2019 v Cayman Islands
- Last T20I: 21 November 2022 v Oman

Domestic team information
- Years: Team
- 2015–2017: St Kitts and Nevis Patriots
- 2016–2017: ICC Americas
- 2016: Barisal Bulls
- 2018: Toronto Nationals
- 2019: Montreal Tigers
- 2021: New Jersey Stallions
- Source: ESPN Cricinfo, 30 April 2023

Nikhil Dutta (born 13 October 1994) is a Canadian cricketer. He has represented the Canada national cricket team since 2013 as a right-arm off spin bowler. He has also played for franchises in the Caribbean Premier League, Bangladesh Premier League and Global T20 Canada.

== Personal life ==
Dutta was born on 13 October 1994 in Kuwait City. He is the son of Bengali parents originally from Kolkata, West Bengal, India. The family moved to Canada in 1999 and settled in Toronto. His father Mihir Dutta, a software engineer, co-founded Mississauga-based Ontario Cricket Academy in 2002 along with Derek Perera.

Dutta attended Father Michael Goetz Secondary School in Mississauga. As of 2015 he was studying to become a financial advisor.

== International career ==
In 2011, aged 16, Dutta was named in Canada's squad for the 2011 ICC Americas Under-19 Championship in Fort Lauderdale.

Dutta made his senior One Day International debut for Canada against Kenya in March 2013. He did not bat, and bowled six overs without taking a wicket. He was originally included in Canada's squad for the 2015 ICC World Twenty20 Qualifier tournament in July 2015, but he chose to stay with the St Kitts and Nevis Patriots in the Caribbean Premier League. He was replaced by Hiral Patel. In January 2018, he played in the 2018 ICC World Cricket League Division Two tournament, ending up as Canada's leading bowler, with 11 wickets.

He was in Canada's squad for the 2018–19 ICC World Twenty20 Americas Qualifier tournament. In October 2018, he was named in Canada's squad for the 2018–19 Regional Super50 tournament in the West Indies. In April 2019, he was named in Canada's squad for the 2019 ICC World Cricket League Division Two tournament in Namibia.

In August 2019, he was named in Canada's squad for the Regional Finals of the 2018–19 ICC T20 World Cup Americas Qualifier tournament. He made his Twenty20 International (T20I) debut against the Cayman Islands on 18 August 2019. In September 2019, he was named in Canada's squad for the 2019 Malaysia Cricket World Cup Challenge League A tournament. In October 2019, he was named in Canada's squad for the 2019 ICC T20 World Cup Qualifier tournament in the United Arab Emirates.

Nikhil was selected for the T20 World Cup team 2024 for Canada. He played one game and got an important wicket against USA team.

== Franchise career ==
Dutta played for St Kitts and Nevis Patriots in the 2015 Caribbean Premier League; he played in three matches with his most notable wicket being former England international Kevin Pietersen. Later that year, Dutta was signed by the Barisal Bulls, one of the six teams playing in the 2015 Bangladesh Premier League. He played one game, taking 3/18.

On 3 June 2018, he was selected to play for the Toronto Nationals in the players' draft for the inaugural edition of the Global T20 Canada tournament. In June 2019, he was selected to play for the Montreal Tigers franchise team in the 2019 Global T20 Canada tournament. He was added to the New Jersey Stallions for the 2021 Minor League Cricket season.

In June 2024, he was selected to play for the Toronto Nationals franchise team in the 2024 Global T20 Canada tournament.
