= Paul Manning (cricketer) =

Caymanian cricketer (born 1990)

Personal information
- Full name: Paul Manning
- Born: 25 September 1990 (age 36)

International information
- National side: Cayman Islands
- T20I debut (cap 5): 18 August 2019 v Canada
- Last T20I: 4 March 2023 v Argentina

Umpiring information
- T20Is umpired: 3 (2025)
- Source: Cricinfo, 5 March 2023

Paul Manning (born 25 September 1990) is a Caymanian cricketer. In August 2019, he was named in the Cayman Islands cricket team's Twenty20 International (T20I) squad for the Regional Finals of the 2018–19 ICC T20 World Cup Americas Qualifier tournament. He made his T20I debut for the Cayman Islands against Canada on 18 August 2019.

== See also ==
- List of Twenty20 International cricket umpires
