= Allan Douglas (cricketer, born 1987) =

Bermudian cricketer (born 1987)

Personal information
- Full name: Allan Craig Douglas
- Born: 11 May 1987 (age 39); Bermuda
- Batting: Right-handed
- Relatives: Allan Douglas (father)

International information
- National side: Bermuda
- T20I debut (cap 18): 18 August 2019 v United States
- Last T20I: 14 November 2021 v Argentina

Career statistics
Competition	T20I	T20
Matches	16	24
Runs scored	327	386
Batting average	23.35	19.30
100s/50s	–/2	–/2
Top score	74	74
Balls bowled	134	158
Wickets	14	17
Bowling average	10.14	10.00
5 wickets in innings	1	1
10 wickets in match	–	–
Best bowling	5/18	5/18
Catches/stumpings	7/–	12/–
- Source: Cricinfo, 29 November 2022

Allan Craig Douglas (born 11 May 1987) is a Bermudian cricketer. He played in the 2014 ICC World Cricket League Division Three tournament.

In August 2019, he was named in Bermuda's squad for the Regional Finals of the 2018–19 ICC T20 World Cup Americas Qualifier tournament. He made his Twenty20 International (T20I) debut against the United States on 18 August 2019. In the final match of the Regional Finals, against the Cayman Islands, Douglas became the first bowler for Bermuda to take a five-wicket haul in a T20I match.

He was in Bermuda's squad for the 2019 ICC T20 World Cup Qualifier tournament in the United Arab Emirates, and for the 2021 ICC Men's T20 World Cup Americas Qualifier tournament in Antigua.
