= Navneet Dhaliwal =

Canadian cricketer (born 1988)

Personal information
- Born: 10 October 1988 (age 38); Chandigarh, India
- Batting: Right-handed
- Bowling: Right-arm medium
- Role: Batsman

International information
- National side: Canada
- ODI debut (cap 98): 8 February 2024 v Nepal
- Last ODI: 25 May 2025 2024 v United States
- T20I debut (cap 42): 18 August 2019 v Cayman Islands
- Last T20I: 19 February 2026 v Afghanistan
- Source: ESPNcricinfo, 20 February 2026

Navneet Dhaliwal (born 10 October 1988) is an Indian-born former cricketer and former captain who played for the Canada national cricket team.

== Early life ==
Navneet Dhaliwal was born on 10 October 1988 in Chandigarh, India. He moved to Canada at the age of 22 when his family bought a gas station.

== Career ==
He made his List A cricket debut in the 2015 ICC World Cricket League Division Two tournament for Canada against the Netherlands on 17 January 2015.

In January 2018, he was named in Canada's squad for the 2018 ICC World Cricket League Division Two tournament. In September 2018, he was named in Canada's squad for the 2018–19 ICC World Twenty20 Americas Qualifier tournament. He was the leading run-scorer for Canada in the tournament, with 83 runs in six matches.

In October 2018, he was named in Canada's squad for the 2018–19 Regional Super50 tournament in the West Indies. He was the leading run-scorer for Canada in the tournament, with 271 runs in six matches. In April 2019, he was named in Canada's squad for the 2019 ICC World Cricket League Division Two tournament in Namibia. He was the leading run-scorer for Canada in the tournament, with 219 runs in five matches.

In June 2019, he was selected to play for the Edmonton Royals franchise team in the 2019 Global T20 Canada tournament.

In August 2019, he was named as the captain of Canada's squad for the Regional Finals of the 2018–19 ICC T20 World Cup Americas Qualifier tournament. He made his Twenty20 International (T20I) debut for Canada against the Cayman Islands on 18 August 2019. He finished the tournament as the leading run-scorer, with 190 runs in six matches.

In September 2019, he was named as the captain of Canada's squad for the 2019 Malaysia Cricket World Cup Challenge League A tournament. On 19 September 2019, in the match against Malaysia, he scored 140 runs from 94 balls, as Canada made 408/7 from their 50 overs. He finished the tournament as the leading run-scorer for Canada, with 250 runs in three matches. In October 2019, he was named as the captain of Canada's squad for the 2019 ICC T20 World Cup Qualifier tournament in the United Arab Emirates. Ahead of the tournament, the International Cricket Council (ICC) named him as the key player in Canada's squad.

In October 2021, he was named as the captain of Canada's squad for the 2021 ICC Men's T20 World Cup Americas Qualifier tournament in Antigua. In February 2022, he was again named as captain of the national side for the 2022 ICC Men's T20 World Cup Global Qualifier A tournament in Oman.

In May 2024, he was named in Canada’s squad for the 2024 ICC Men's T20 World Cup tournament.

In April 2025, he was named in Canada's squad for 2025 North American Cup held in Cayman Islands. He finished the tournament by being the leading run scorer for Canada in the tournament. In May 2025, he was named in Canada's squad for 2025 United States Tri-Nation Series

In January 2026, he was named in Canada’s squad for the 2026 ICC Men's T20 World Cup tournament.

In February 2026, Dhaliwal announced his retirement from international cricket final game against Afghanistan in T20 World Cup 2026.
