= Kaleem Sana =

Pakistani-Canadian cricketer (born 1994)

Personal information
- Full name: Kaleem Sana Rehman
- Born: 1 January 1994 (age 32); Rawalpindi, Punjab, Pakistan
- Batting: Right-handed
- Bowling: Left-arm medium-fast
- Role: Bowler

International information
- National side: Canada
- ODI debut (cap 87): 27 March 2023 v Jersey
- Last ODI: 25 May 2025 v United States
- T20I debut (cap 60): 18 February 2022 v Philippines
- Last T20I: 22 June 2025 v Bermuda

Domestic team information
- Years: Team
- 2009-2010: Pakistan Customs
- 2012–2014: Rawalpindi Rams
- 2014: Khan Research Laboratories
- 2019: Winnipeg Hawks
- 2023-2024: Montreal Tigers
- Source: Cricinfo, 31 October 2024

Kaleem Sana (born 1 January 1994) is a Pakistani-born cricketer who plays as a fast bowler for the Canadian national cricket team.

== Career ==
Sana played under-19 cricket for Pakistan. He made his first-class debut for the Pakistan Customs in the 2008–09 Quaid-e-Azam Trophy on 9 January 2009. He made his List A debut for Rawalpindi Rams in the 2011–12 National One Day Championship on 12 March 2012.

In October 2021, he was named in Canada's Twenty20 International (T20I) squad for the 2021 ICC Men's T20 World Cup Americas Qualifier tournament in Antigua. In February 2022, he was named in Canada's T20I squad for the 2022 ICC Men's T20 World Cup Global Qualifier A tournament in Oman. He made his T20I debut on 18 February 2022, for Canada against the Philippines.

In March 2023, he was named in Canada's squad for the 2023 Cricket World Cup Qualifier Play-off. He made his One Day International (ODI) debut on 27 March 2023, for Canada, against Jersey in that tournament.

In May 2024, he was named to Canada’s squad for the 2024 ICC Men's T20 World Cup tournament.

In April 2025, he was named in Canada's squad for 2025 North American Cup held in Cayman Islands. He finished the tournament by being the leading wicket taker for Canada in the tournament. In May 2025, he was named in Canada's squad for 2025 United States Tri-Nation Series

In July 2026, he was drafted by Mississauga Masters for the 2026 Canada Super60 season.

In October 2026, he was signed by Toronto Kings for the 2026 Global T20 Canada season.
