= Derrick Brangman =

Bermudian cricketer (born 1987)

Personal information
- Born: 24 August 1987 (age 39)

International information
- National side: Bermuda
- T20I debut (cap 24): 19 August 2019 v Canada
- Last T20I: 4 March 2023 v Bahamas
- Source: Cricinfo, 24 February 2023

Derrick Brangman (born 24 August 1987) is a Bermudian cricketer who prefers left hand bat as his batting style. He was named in Bermuda's squad for the 2013 ICC World Twenty20 Qualifier tournament. He made his Twenty20 debut during the tournament, against Scotland, on 15 November 2013.

In July 2018, Brangman was suspended by the Bermuda Cricket Board for a year after refusing to walk following his dismissal in a club match for Bailey's Bay against Western Stars which led to the match being abandoned. An arbitration ruling reduced the ban to four matches.

In August 2019, he was named in Bermuda's squad for the Regional Finals of the 2018–19 ICC T20 World Cup Americas Qualifier tournament. He made his Twenty20 International (T20I) debut against Canada on 19 August 2019. In September 2019, he was named in Bermuda's squad for the 2019 ICC T20 World Cup Qualifier tournament in the United Arab Emirates. In November 2019, he was named in Bermuda's squad for the Cricket World Cup Challenge League B tournament in Oman. He made his List A debut, for Bermuda against Kenya, on 8 December 2019. He has since played six list A matches in 2024 with the latest being against Bahrain on 3rd March.
