= Dillon Heyliger =

Canadian cricketer (born 1989)

Personal information
- Born: 21 October 1989 (age 37); Suddie, Guyana
- Batting: Right-handed
- Bowling: Right-arm medium-fast
- Role: Bowler

International information
- National side: Canada (2019–present)
- ODI debut (cap 95): 4 April 2023 v Namibia
- Last ODI: 26 September 2024 v Oman
- T20I debut (cap 45): 18 August 2019 v Cayman Islands
- Last T20I: 1 October 2024 v Nepal

Domestic team information
- Years: Team
- 2011: Guyana
- 2018–present: Montreal Tigers

Career statistics
Competition	T20I	ODI	LA
Matches	45	16	42
Runs scored	358	174	345
Batting average	29.83	19.33	15.68
100s/50s	0/0	0/1	0/1
Top score	30	56	56
Balls bowled	841	778	1,677
Wickets	49	27	56
Bowling average	21.30	23.07	24.48
5 wickets in innings	1	1	2
10 wickets in match	0	0	0
Best bowling	5/16	5/31	5/31
Catches/stumpings	8/–	1/–	7/–
- Source: Cricinfo, 27 November 2022

Dillon Heyliger (born 21 October 1989) is a Canadian cricketer who plays for the Canada national cricket team.

== Personal life ==
Heyliger was born in Suddie on the Essequibo Coast of Guyana. He is one of four sons born to Orin and Tennessee Heyliger and attended the Abram Zuil Secondary School.

== Domestic and franchise career ==
Heyliger represented Guyana in cricket at the under-15 and under-19 levels. He was selected in Guyana's squad for the 2011 Caribbean Twenty20 but did not play a game. He played club cricket in Guyana for Santos Sports Club in his home town of Suddie and later moved to the capital Georgetown where he played for Guyana Defense Force in the Georgetown Cricket Association. Heyliger also played club cricket in Antigua, Trinidad and England, making appearances for Basingstoke in the Hampshire League and Uxbridge in the Middlesex County Cricket League.

Heyliger moved to Canada in 2014. He began playing for the Islanders in the Toronto District Cricket Association and switched to the Vikings in 2015. On 3 June 2018, he was selected to play for the Montreal Tigers in the players' draft for the inaugural edition of the Global T20 Canada tournament. He played for the Montreal Tigers in the 2019 Global T20 Canada tournament.

In June 2021, He was selected to take part in the Minor League Cricket tournament in the United States following the players' draft.

== International career ==
Heyliger made his List A debut for Canada in the 2018 ICC World Cricket League Division Two tournament on 8 February 2018.

In September 2018, He was named in Canada's squad for the 2018–19 ICC World Twenty20 Americas Qualifier tournament. In October 2018, he was named in Canada's squad for the 2018–19 Regional Super50 tournament in the West Indies. In April 2019, he was named in Canada's squad for the 2019 ICC World Cricket League Division Two tournament in Namibia.

In August 2019, He was named in Canada's squad for the Regional Finals of the 2018–19 ICC T20 World Cup Americas Qualifier tournament. He made his Twenty20 International (T20I) debut for Canada against the Cayman Islands on 18 August 2019. He finished the tournament as the leading wicket-taker, with eleven dismissals in five matches.

In September 2019, He was named in Canada's squad for the 2019 Malaysia Cricket World Cup Challenge League A tournament. In October 2019, he was named in Canada's squad for the 2019 ICC T20 World Cup Qualifier tournament in the United Arab Emirates. Ahead of the tournament, the International Cricket Council (ICC) named him as the player to watch in Canada's squad.

In October 2021, He was named in Canada's squad for the 2021 ICC Men's T20 World Cup Americas Qualifier tournament in Antigua. On 13 November 2021, in Canada's match against Argentina, Heyliger became the first bowler for Canada to take a five-wicket haul in T20Is. In February 2022, he was named in Canada's squad for the 2022 ICC Men's T20 World Cup Global Qualifier A tournament in Oman.

In July 2022, Heyliger was named in Canada's squad for the 2022 Canada Cricket World Cup Challenge League A tournament. In the opening match of the tournament, against Denmark, he took his first five-wicket haul in List A cricket.

On 4 April 2023, He made his One Day International (ODI) debut against Namibia in 2023 Cricket World Cup Qualifier Play-off.

In May 2024, he was named in Canada’s squad for the 2024 ICC Men's T20 World Cup tournament.
