= Sacha de Alwis =

Sri Lankan cricketer

Personal information
- Full name: Yeron Sacha DeAlwis Seneveratne
- Born: 30 January 1992 (age 34); Sri Lanka
- Batting: Left-handed
- Bowling: Slow left-arm orthodox

International information
- National side: Cayman Islands

Domestic team information
- Years: Team
- 2016/17: Bloomfield Cricket and Athletic Club
- 2021: Dambulla Giants

Career statistics
Competition	T20I	FC	LA	T20
Matches	18	10	24	35
Runs scored	495	200	406	713
Batting average	33.00	11.76	16.91	23.00
100s/50s	1/3	0/0	0/3	1/3
Top score	150*	35	66	150*
Balls bowled	18	6	48	18
Wickets	0	0	1	0
Bowling average	–	–	55.00	–
5 wickets in innings	–	–	0	–
10 wickets in match	–	–	0	–
Best bowling	–	–	1/42	–
Catches/stumpings	5/–	1/–	8/–	10/–
- Source: ESPNcricinfo, 5 March 2025

Yeron Sacha De Alwis Seneveratne (born 30 January 1992) is a Sri Lankan cricketer. He made his first-class debut for Bloomfield Cricket and Athletic Club in the 2016–17 Premier League Tournament on 3 December 2016. Prior to his first-class debut, he represented the Cayman Islands in the 2015 ICC World Cricket League Division Six tournament.

De Alwis grew up partially in the Cayman Islands, where his father Sarath worked as an obstetrician and gynecologist and his mother Rashantha worked as a lawyer. He attended boarding school in Colombo. He and his family narrowly escaped the 2004 Indian Ocean earthquake and tsunami, at which time they were staying in the coastal city of Kalutara to attend his grandfather's funeral. de Alwis played for the Cayman Islands national under-19 team at the 2011 ICC Americas Under-19 Championship in the United States. He scored 92 against Bermuda and 108 not out against Argentina.

In September 2017, he scored the most runs for the Cayman Islands in the 2017 ICC World Cricket League Division Five tournament, with a total of 273 runs in five matches. In August 2019, he was named in the Cayman Islands cricket team's Twenty20 International (T20I) squad for the Regional Finals of the 2018–19 ICC T20 World Cup Americas Qualifier tournament. He made his T20I debut for the Cayman Islands against Canada on 18 August 2019. He scored the first ever t20I century for Cayman Islands in the 2024 American Sub Regional Qualifiers. It was the 4th highest score overall, behind Glenn Maxwell's 145.

He made his List A debut on 26 March 2021, for Sebastianites Cricket and Athletic Club in the 2020–21 Major Clubs Limited Over Tournament. In November 2021, he was selected to play for the Dambulla Giants following the players' draft for the 2021 Lanka Premier League. In July 2022, he was signed by the Dambulla Giants for the third edition of the Lanka Premier League.
