= Kamau Leverock =

Bermudian cricketer (born 1994)

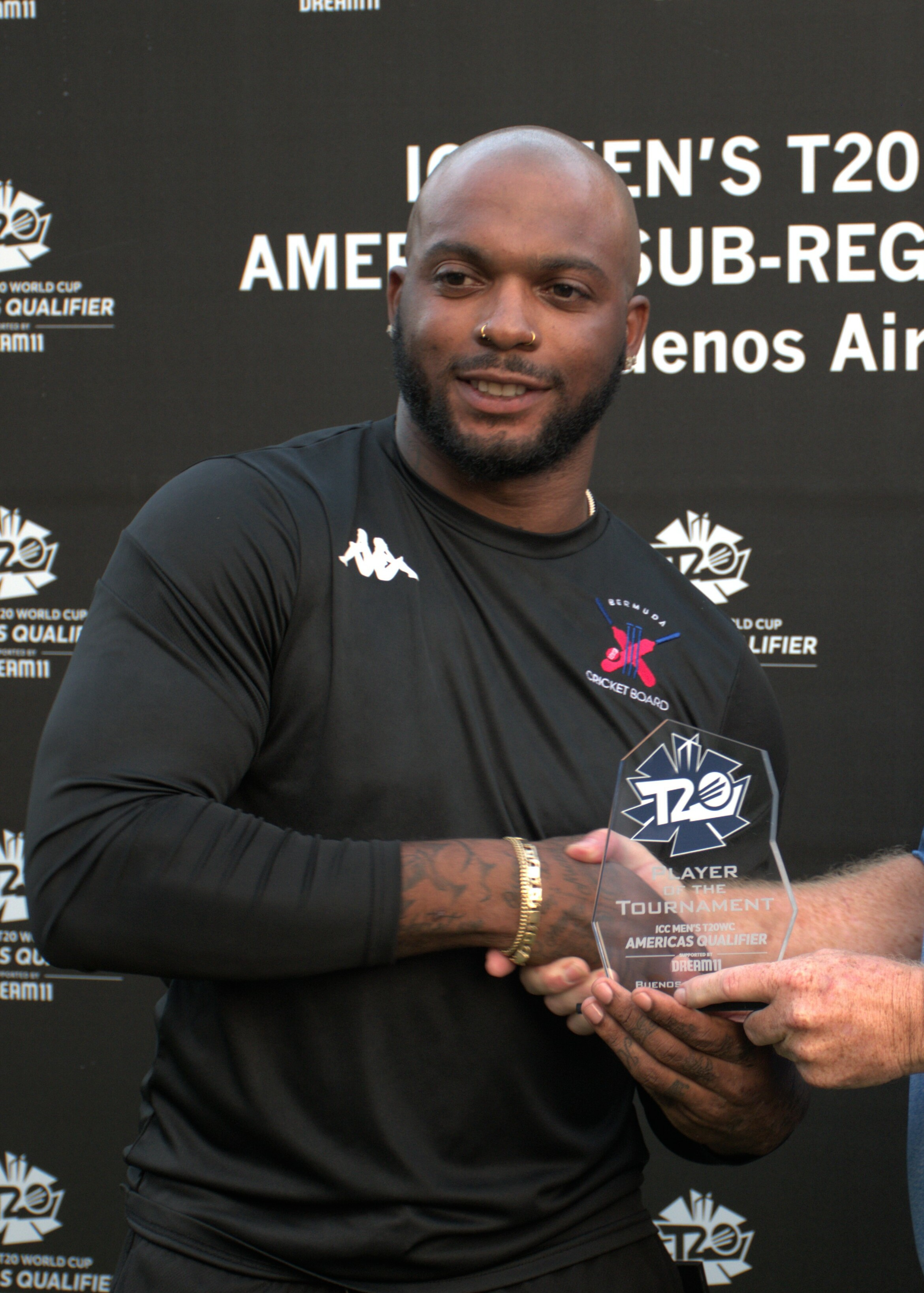

Personal information
- Full name: Kamau Sadiki Leverock
- Born: 19 October 1994 (age 32); Bermuda
- Batting: Left-handed
- Bowling: Right-arm medium-fast
- Relatives: Dwayne Leverock (uncle)

International information
- National side: Bermuda
- T20I debut (cap 21): 18 August 2019 v United States
- Last T20I: 7 October 2023 v Canada

Domestic team information
- Years: Team
- 2015–2017: Cardiff MCCU

Career statistics
Competition	T20I	FC	LA	T20
Matches	29	4	23	45
Runs scored	842	69	674	966
Batting average	33.68	17.25	29.30	29.27
100s/50s	1/4	0/0	0/6	1/4
Top score	101	25	75	103
Balls bowled	460	408	588	704
Wickets	25	2	20	33
Bowling average	21.00	142.00	33.40	27.69
5 wickets in innings	0	0	0	0
10 wickets in match	0	0	0	0
Best bowling	4/28	1/56	4/62	4/28
Catches/stumpings	12/–	1/–	8/–	16/–
- Source: ESPNcricinfo, 3 November 2023

Kamau Sadiki Leverock (born 19 October 1994) is a Bermudian cricketer and the captain of the Bermuda cricket team. A nephew of two former ODI players, Dwayne Leverock (Bermuda) and Alvin Greenidge (West Indies), Leverock is a left-handed batsman who bowls right-arm fast-medium. He was educated at the Bermuda Institute.

== Career ==
Having played for Bermuda at various age levels, Leverock made his debut against Argentina in the 2011 ICC World Cricket League Americas Region Twenty20 Division One. He made five further appearances during the tournament. Later in 2011, he played Second XI cricket in England for Surrey. In 2012, he was selected as part of Bermuda's fourteen-man squad for the 2012 World Twenty20 Qualifier in the United Arab Emirates. He made his Twenty20 debut during the tournament against Denmark, with him making eight further appearances during the tournament, the last of which came against Uganda. In his nine matches, he scored 75 runs at an average of 15.00, with a high score of 21 not out. With the ball, he took 4 wickets at an expensive bowling average of 63.25, with best figures of 2/28. Bermuda finished the tournament in thirteenth place and therefore missed out on qualification for the 2012 World Twenty in Sri Lanka.

While studying at Cardiff Metropolitan University in Wales, Leverock was selected for Cardiff MCC University's squad. He made his first-class debut for the team in April 2015, playing against Gloucestershire in Bristol. The previous year, before playing for Bermuda in the 2014 WCL Division Three tournament in Malaysia, Leverock had played English club cricket for Horsham, a team that plays in the Sussex Cricket League.

He made his List A debut for ICC Americas in the 2016–17 Regional Super50 on 26 January 2017.

In April 2018, he was named in Bermuda's squad for the 2018 ICC World Cricket League Division Four tournament in Malaysia. He was named as the player to watch in the squad ahead of the tournament.

On 3 June 2018, he was selected to play for the Vancouver Knights in the players' draft for the inaugural edition of the Global T20 Canada tournament.

In August 2019, he was named in Bermuda's squad for the Regional Finals of the 2018–19 ICC T20 World Cup Americas Qualifier tournament. He made his Twenty20 International (T20I) debut against the United States on 18 August 2019. In September 2019, he was named in Bermuda's squad for the 2019 ICC T20 World Cup Qualifier tournament in the United Arab Emirates. He was the leading wicket-taker for Bermuda in the tournament, with eight dismissals in six matches. In November 2019, he was named in Bermuda's squad for the Cricket World Cup Challenge League B tournament in Oman.

In October 2021, he was named as the captain of Bermuda's squad for the 2021 ICC Men's T20 World Cup Americas Qualifier tournament in Antigua. In May 2022, he was named as the captain of Bermuda's side for the 2022 Uganda Cricket World Cup Challenge League B tournament.
