= List of Montserrat Twenty20 players =

From their first match in 2006 to their final match in 2008, fourteen players represented the Montserrat cricket team in Twenty20 (T20) matches in the Stanford 20/20. A Twenty20 is a cricket match between two representative teams of one twenty over innings per side.

Montserrat has fielded a representative team as early as 1912. In regional domestic cricket, Montserrat plays as part of the Leeward Islands cricket team, which holds first-class, List A (neither of which Montserrat has ever held) and Twenty20 status. However, for the Stanford 20/20, islands in the Caribbean were allowed to play as separate teams, allowing Montserrat the chance to compete with its own team in the 2006 tournament. Montserrat played one match in the tournament, in the first round against Guyana, losing by eight wickets and being eliminated from the tournament. Two years later, Montserrat took part in the 2008 tournament. They played two matches in the tournament, one a preliminary round victory by nine wickets against International Cricket Council Affiliate Members the Turks and Caicos Islands and a second in the first round against Nevis, which they lost by 74 runs. Montserrat would have taken part in a further tournament to be played in 2009, however its creator Allen Stanford was charged with fraud and arrested in June 2009, bringing an end to the competition. The tournament was then replaced by the Caribbean Twenty20, with only first-class teams allowed to take part. (Note: The first-class domestic teams in the West Indies are: Barbados, Combined Campuses and Colleges, Guyana, Jamaica, Leeward Islands, Trinidad and Tobago and Windward Islands.)

In total, Montserrat played three Twenty20 matches, all at the Stanford Cricket Ground, with eight players playing in all three matches. Dolston Tuit scored more runs than any other Montserratian with 47. The highest score by a Montserratian is Trevor Semper's 35 against Nevis. McPherson Meade has claimed more wickets in Twenty20 matches than any other Montserratian with 4, while Lionel Baker's 2/8 are the best bowling figures. Davon Williams captained the team in all three matches, while David Lane was the team's wicket-keeper in all three matches it played.

This list includes all players who have played at least one Twenty20 match and is initially arranged in the order of debut appearance. Where more than one player won their first cap in the same match, those players are initially listed alphabetically at the time of debut.

== Key ==
General

- ‡ – Captain
- † – Wicket-keeper
- First – Year of debut
- Last – Year of latest game
- Mat – Number of matches played

Batting

- Inn – Number of innings batted
- NO – Number of innings not out
- Runs – Runs scored in career
- HS – Highest score
- Avg – Runs scored per dismissal
- * – Batsman remained not out

Bowling

- Balls – Balls bowled in career
- Wkt – Wickets taken in career
- BBI – Best bowling in an innings
- Ave – Average runs per wicket
- Eco - Average runs conceded per over

Fielding

- Ca – Catches taken
- St – Stumpings taken

== Twenty20 cricketers ==
Montserrat Twenty20 cricketers
No.	Name	First	Last	Mat	Inn	NO	Runs	HS	Avg	Balls	Wkt	BBI	Ave	Eco	Ca	St	Ref
No.	Name	First	Last	Mat	Batting					Bowling					Fielding		Ref
1	Nesta Piper	2006	2006	1	1	0	11	11	11.00	—	—	—	—	—	0	0	
2	McPherson Meade	2006	2007/08	3	2	0	30	21	15.00	50	4	2/10	8.25	3.96	2	0	
3	Davon Williams ‡	2006	2007/08	3	3	1	43	15	21.50	—	—	—	—	—	1	0	
4	Lionel Baker	2006	2007/08	3	3	1	30	17	15.00	72	3	2/8	29.33	7.33	1	0	
5	Trevor Semper	2006	2007/08	3	2	0	42	35	21.00	60	2	1/5	33.50	6.70	1	0	
6	Dolston Tuit	2006	2007/08	3	3	0	47	30	15.66	—	—	—	—	—	0	0	
7	Mark Stephney	2006	2007/08	3	2	1	30	21*	30.00	42	—	—	—	6.14	0	0	
8	David Lane †	2006	2007/08	3	2	0	8	6	4.00	—	—	—	—	—	0	1	
9	Daren Sweeney	2006	2007/08	3	2	0	1	1	0.50	49	—	—	—	5.36	0	0	
10	Brian Stephney	2006	2007/08	2	2	0	4	2*	—	48	1	1/32	71.00	8.87	1	0	
11	Omari Allen	2006	2006	1	0	0	—	—	—	—	—	—	—	—	0	0	
12	Quinton Boatswain	2007/08	2007/08	1	0	0	—	—	—	12	—	—	—	4.00	0	0	
13	Shernyl Burns	2007/08	2007/08	2	1	1	1	1*	—	—	—	—	—	—	0	0	
14	Zhaun Sweeney	2007/08	2007/08	2	1	0	16	16	16.00	—	—	—	—	—	0	0	
