= 2011 Americas Twenty20 Division Two =

2011 ICC World Cricket League Americas Region Twenty20 Division Two
- Administrator: International Cricket Council
- Cricket format: Twenty20
- Tournament format: Round-robin
- Host: Suriname
- Champions: Suriname
- Participants: 6
- Matches: 15
- Most runs: (Turks and Caicos Islands) Garvin Bruno (165)
- Most wickets: (Belize) Mykelt Anthony (10)
- Official website: ICC Americas Region

The 2011 ICC World Cricket League Americas Region Twenty20 Division Two was a cricket tournament that took place between 9–13 April 2011. Suriname hosted the event.

== Teams ==
The teams that qualified automatically were as follows:

- Bahamas
- Brazil
- Panama
- Suriname
- Turks and Caicos Islands

The team that qualified for winning the 2011 ICC Americas Twenty20 Division Three was as follows:

- Belize

== Fixtures ==
=== Points Table ===
Team	P	W	L	T	NR	Points	NRR
Suriname	5	4	1	0	0	8	0.321
Panama	5	3	2	0	0	6	1.158
Belize	5	3	2	0	0	6	1.303
Turks and Caicos Islands	5	3	2	0	0	6	–0.410
Bahamas	5	2	3	0	0	4	–0.265
Brazil	5	0	5	0	0	0	–2.540

=== Matches ===
9 April
5.30 p.m.
Scorecard

Brazil; 84/3 (15 overs)	v	Suriname; 90/3 (13.2 overs)
Deodat Randolph 35* (38); Troy Dudnath 1/15 (3 overs); Shazam Ram-John 1/15 (3 overs)		Troy Dudnath 34 (28); Rubabul Islam 2/13 (3 overs)

Suriname won by 7 wickets
Snellenpark
Umpires: C. Samaroo (Cay) and Hubert Smythe (Cay)
Player of the match: Troy Dudnath (Sur)

- Suriname won the toss and elected to field.

9 April
5.30 p.m.
Scorecard

Panama; 81/5 (10 overs)	v	Belize; 87/4 (9.3 overs)
Soyab Chohan 22 (11); Mykelt Anthony 2/16 (3 overs)		Warren Anthony 19 (11); Ibrahim Vora 2/6 (2 overs)

Belize won by 6 wickets (D/L)
Owru Cul
Umpires: S. Taylor (USA) and M. Gibson (Arg)
Player of the match: Kenroy Roca (Biz)

- Panama won the toss and elected to bat.

10 April
1.00 p.m.
Scorecard

Bahamas; 48/2 (10.1 overs)	v	Turks and Caicos Islands; 49/2 (7 overs)
Ryan Tappin 12 (15); Howard Dickenson 2/13 (4 overs)		Garvin Bruno 20 (24); Jonathan Barry 1/12 (2 overs)

Turks and Caicos Islands won by 8 wickets (D/L)
Owru Cul
Umpires: Karran Bayney (Can) and K. Patel (Can)

- Turks and Caicos Islands won the toss and elected to field.

10 April
1.00 p.m.
Scorecard

Belize; 77/9 (20 overs)	v	Suriname; 49/2 (7.3 overs)
Mykelt Anthony 32 (30); Shazam Ram-John 3/16 (4 overs)		Troy Dudnauth 25 (23); Keve Flowers 1/5 (2 overs)

Suriname won by 8 wickets (D/L)
Owru Cul
Umpires: C. Samaroo (Cay) and Hubert Smythe (Cay)
Player of the match: Troy Dudnauth (Sur)

- Belize won the toss and elected to bat.

10 April
5.30 p.m.
Scorecard

Bahamas; 102/5 (14 overs)	v	Brazil; 36/2 (6 overs)
Ryan Tappin 21 (32); Rubabul Islam 1/12 (3 overs)		Rubabul Islam 11* (9); Jonathan Barry 1/14 (2 overs)

Bahamas won by 6 runs (D/L)
Snellenpark
Umpires: K. Patel (Can) and M. Gibson (Arg)
Player of the match: Jonathan Barry (Bah)

- Brazil won the toss and elected to field.

11 April
1.00 p.m.
Scorecard

Turks and Caicos Islands; 176/2 (20 overs)	v	Panama; 177/7 (18.4 overs)
Garvin Bruno 88* (50); Hiren Ahir 1/17 (2 overs)		Tarick Daya 56 (34); Garvin Bruno 2/34 (3.4 overs)

Panama won by 3 wickets
Snellenpark
Umpires: M. Gibson (Arg) and K. Patel (Can)
Player of the match: Tarick Daya (Pan)

- Panama won the toss and elected to field.

11 April
1.00 p.m.
Scorecard

Belize; 166/6 (20 overs)	v	Brazil; 90/5 (20 overs)
Warren Anthony 45 (37); Daniel Miziara 2/45 (4 overs)		Greigor Caisley 34 (44); Dirk Sutherland 4/19 (4 overs)

Belize won by 76 runs
Owru Cul
Umpires: C. Samaroo (Cay) and Hubert Smythe (Cay)
Player of the match: Dirk Sutherland (Biz)

- Brazil won the toss and elected to field.

11 April
5.30 p.m.
Scorecard

Bahamas; 136/7 (20 overs)	v	Panama; 98/7 (17.5 overs)
Jonathan Barry 34 (21); Haroon Badat 3/27 (4 overs)		Haroon Badat 25 (25); Shanaka Perera 4/17 (2.5 overs)

Bahamas won 38 runs
Snellenpark
Umpires: Karran Bayney (Can) and Hubert Smythe (Cay)
Player of the match: Shanaka Perera (Bah)

- Bahamas won the toss and elected to bat.

11 April
5.30 p.m.
Scorecard

Turks and Caicos Islands; 83/9 (20 overs)	v	Suriname; 84/2 (11.3 overs)
Rohan Ash 16 (18); Carlton Baker 5/20 (4 overs)		Shazam Ram-John 37 (23); Sabuton John 1/10 (2.3 overs)

Suriname won by 8 wickets
Owru Cul
Umpires: S. Taylor (USA) and M. Gibson (Arg)
Player of the match: Carlton Baker (Sur)

- Suriname won the toss and elected to field.

13 April
1.00 p.m.
Scorecard

Brazil; 144/9 (20 overs)	v	Turks and Caicos Islands; 146/3 (16.3 overs)
Matt Featherstone 43 (21); Rohan Ash 3/39 (4 overs)		Damian St. Ange 61* (32); Rubabul Islam 1/24 (4 overs)

Turks and Caicos Islands won by 7 wickets
Snellenpark
Umpires: C. Samaroo (Cay) and K. Patel (Can)
Player of the match: Damian St. Ange (TCI)

- Brazil won the toss and elected to bat.

13 April
1.00 p.m.
Scorecard

Belize; 158/5 (20 overs)	v	Bahamas; 110 (17.2 overs)
Conway Young 42 (31); Whitcliff Atkinson 2/32 (4 overs)		Ryan Tappin 31 (32); Mykelt Anthony 5/17 (4 overs)

Belize won by 48 runs
SPI Veld
Umpires: S. Taylor (USA) and Hubert Smythe (Cay)
Player of the match: Mykelt Anthony (Biz)

- Bahamas won the toss and elected to field.

13 April
1.00 p.m.
Scorecard

Panama; 127 (19.5 overs)	v	Suriname; 60 (19 overs)
Irfan Tarajia 34 (26); Arun Gokoel 3/33 (3.5 overs)		Monhindra Boodram 10 (22); Ibrahim Vhora 4/5 (4 overs)

Panama won by 67 runs
Owru Cul
Umpires: Karran Bayney (Can) and M. Gibson (Arg)
Player of the match: Ibrahim Vhora (Pan)

- Panama won the toss and elected to bat.

13 April
5.30 p.m.
Scorecard

Bahamas; 152/6 (20 overs)	v	Suriname; 154/4 (19.1 overs)
Whitcliff Atkinson 61 (38); Aniel Seegobin 1/8 (1 overs)		Vishual Singh 45 (24); Andrew Nash 2/35 (4 overs)

Suriname won by 6 wickets
Snellenpark
Umpires: M. Gibson (Arg) and Hubert Smythe (Cay)

- Bahamas won the toss and elected to bat.

13 April
5.30 p.m.
Scorecard

Belize; 107 (18.1 overs)	v	Turks and Caicos Islands; 110/8 (19.3 overs)
Warren Anthony 43 (43); Damian St. Ange 4/8 (3.1 overs)		Jeremy Jones 35 (37); Mykelt Anthony 3/14 (4 overs)

Turks and Caicos Islands won by 2 wickets
SPI Veld
Umpires: S. Taylor (USA) and K. Patel (Can)
Player of the match: Marcus Charlemagne (TCI)

- Belize won and elected to bat.

13 April
5.30 p.m.
Scorecard

Brazil; 62 (18.1 overs)	v	Panama; 63/6 (10 overs)
Guilherme Lefevre 15 (31); Haroon Badat 2/5 (2 overs)		Rajesh Ahir 18* (21); Ravindra Chanchlani 3/13 (4 overs)

Panama won by 4 wickets
Owru Cul
Umpires: Karran Bayney (Can) and C. Samaroo (Cay)
Player of the match: Rajesh Ahir (Pan)

- Brazil won the toss and elected to bat.

== Statistics ==
=== Most runs ===
The top five highest run scorers (total runs) are included in this table.

Player	Team	Runs
Garvin Bruno	Turks and Caicos Islands	165
Warren Anthony	Belize	140
Jonathan Barry	Bahamas	118
Conway Young	Belize	113
Tarick Daya	Panama	110

=== Most wickets ===
The following table contains the five leading wicket-takers.

Player	Team	Wkts
Mykelt Anthony	Belize	10
Haroon Badat	Panama	9
Ibrahim Vhora	Panama	8
Carlton Baker	Suriname	8
Shazam Ram-John	Suriname	7

== See also ==
- 2012 ICC World Twenty20 Qualifier
