= David Lane (cricketer) =

Montserratian cricketer

Personal information
- Full name: David Steadmond Lane
- Born: 12 May 1965 (age 61); Montserrat
- Batting: Right-handed
- Role: Wicket-keeper

Domestic team information
- Years: Team
- 2006–2007/08: Montserrat

Career statistics
Competition	Twenty20
Matches	3
Runs scored	8
Batting average	6.00
100s/50s	–/–
Top score	4
Catches/stumpings	–/1
- Source: Cricinfo, 13 October 2012

David Steadmond Lane (born 12 May 1965) is a former West Indian cricketer. Lane was a right-handed batsman who fielded as a wicket-keeper. He was born on Montserrat.

In 2006, Montserrat were invited to take part in the 2006 Stanford 20/20, whose matches held official Twenty20 status. Lane made his Twenty20 debut for Montserrat in their first-round match against Guyana, with their first-class opponents winning the match by 8 wickets. Lane scored 6 runs in Montserrat's innings, before he was run out by the combination of Neil McGarrell and Mahendra Nagamootoo. In January 2008, Montserrat were again invited to part in the 2008 Stanford 20/20, where Lane made two further Twenty20 appearances, in a preliminary round match against the Turks and Caicos Islands and in a first round match against Nevis. Against the Turks and Caicos Islands, he made a single stumping in their innings when he stumped Chabbie Charlery off the bowling of McPherson Meade. He wasn't required to bat in Montserrat's nine wicket victory. Against Nevis, he was dismissed for 2 runs by Akito Willett, with Montserrat losing by 74 runs.
