= Omari =

Omari may refer to:

== Places ==
- Omari, Bushehr, a village in Bushehr Province, Iran
- Omari, South Khorasan, a village in South Khorasan Province, Iran

== Given name ==
- Omari Abdallah (born 1943), Tanzanian runner
- Omari Akhmedov (born 1987), Russian mixed martial artist
- Omari Allen (born 1990), Montserratian cricketer
- Omari Bain (born 2002), Bahamian footballer
- Omari Banks (born 1982), Anguillan musician and cricketer
- Omari Caro (born 1991), English rugby league footballer
- Omari Cobb (born 1997), American football player
- Omari Crawford, American politician
- Omari Douglas (born 1994), English actor
- Omari Evans (born 2003), American football player
- Omari Forson (born 2004), English footballer
- Omari Glasgow (born 2003), Guyanese footballer
- Omari Golaya (born 1954), Tanzanian boxer
- Omari Gudul (born 1994), Congolese basketball player
- Omari Hardwick (born 1974), American actor
- Omari Hardy (born 1989), American politician
- Omari Hutchinson (born 2003), English footballer
- Omari Johnson (born 1990), Jamaican-American basketball player
- Omari Jones (born 2002), American boxer
- Omari Kelly (born 2003), American football player
- Omari Kellyman (born 2005), English footballer
- Omari Kimweri (born 1982), Tanzanian-American boxer
- Omari Moore (born 2000), American basketball player
- Omari Newton, Canadian actor
- Omari Nundu (1948–2019), Tanzanian politician
- Omari Nyenje (born 1993), Tanzanian footballer
- Omari Patrick (born 1996), English footballer
- Omari Salisbury (born 1975), American journalist
- Omari Spellman (born 1997), American basketball player
- Omari Sterling-James (born 1993), West Indian footballer
- Omari Swinton (born 1980), American economist
- Omari Tetradze (born 1969), Russian footballer

== Surname ==
- Abdelaziz El Omari (born 1968), Moroccan politician
- Abdulaziz al-Omari (1979–2001), Saudi terrorist
- Adnan bin Abdullah bin Faris al Omari, Saudi terrorist
- Ali El-Omari (born 1978), Moroccan footballer
- Amer Al-Omari (born 1983), Qatari footballer
- Areen Omari, Palestinian actress
- Bahri Omari (1888–1945), Albanian politician
- Constant Omari (born 1958), Congolese football administrator
- Fakhri Al Omari (1936–1991), Palestinian Fatah member
- Fatos Omari, Albanian chess master
- Levy Matebo Omari (born 1989), Kenyan long-distance runner
- Mansour al-Omari (born 1979), Syrian journalist
- Mohammad Nabi Omari (born 1968), Afghan terrorist
- Morocco Omari (born 1975), American film director
- Najibullah Khwaja Omari (born 1955), Afghan politician
- Omar Omari, Pakistani politician
- Osama Omari (born 1992), Syrian footballer
- Qemal Omari, Turkish football manager
- Walid Al-Omari (born 1957), Palestinian journalist
