= Daren Sweeney =

Montserratian cricketer

Personal information
- Full name: Daren Dyvaun Sweeney
- Born: 9 June 1970 (age 56); Montserrat
- Batting: Left-handed
- Bowling: Right-arm medium

Domestic team information
- Years: Team
- 2006–2007/08: Montserrat

Career statistics
Competition	Twenty20
Matches	3
Runs scored	1
Batting average	0.50
100s/50s	–/–
Top score	1
Balls bowled	49
Wickets	–
Bowling average	–
5 wickets in innings	–
10 wickets in match	–
Best bowling	–
Catches/stumpings	–/–
- Source: Cricinfo, 13 October 2012

Daren Dyvaun Sweeney (born 9 June 1970) is a former West Indian cricketer. Sweeney was a left-handed batsman who bowled right-arm medium pace. He was born on Montserrat.

In 2006, Montserrat were invited to take part in the 2006 Stanford 20/20, whose matches held official Twenty20 status. Sweeney made his Twenty20 debut for Montserrat in their first-round match against Guyana, with their first-class opponents winning the match by 8 wickets. Sweeney scored a single run in Montserrat's innings, before he was run out by the combination of Lennox Cush and Mahendra Nagamootoo. In Guyana's innings, he bowled 3.1 wicketless overs, conceding 11 runs. In January 2008, Montserrat were again invited to part in the 2008 Stanford 20/20, where Sweeney made two further Twenty20 appearances, in a preliminary round match against the Turks and Caicos Islands and in a first round match against Nevis. Against the Turks and Caicos Islands, he bowled three wicketless overs, conceding 14 runs. He wasn't required to bat in Montserrat's nine wicket victory. Against Nevis, he bowled two wicketless overs, conceding 21 runs. In Montserrat's innings, was dismissed for a duck by Ian Byron, with Montserrat losing by 74 runs.
