= Mark Stephney =

Montserratian cricketer

Personal information
- Full name: Mark Andrew Stephney
- Born: 12 March 1965 (age 61); Guyana
- Batting: Right-handed
- Bowling: Right-arm medium

Domestic team information
- Years: Team
- 2006–2007/08: Montserrat

Career statistics
Competition	Twenty20
Matches	3
Runs scored	30
Batting average	15.66
100s/50s	–/–
Top score	21*
Balls bowled	42
Wickets	–
Bowling average	–
5 wickets in innings	–
10 wickets in match	–
Best bowling	–
Catches/stumpings	–/–
- Source: Cricinfo, 13 October 2012

Mark Andrew Stephney (born 12 March 1965) is a former West Indian cricketer. Stephney was a right-handed batsman who bowled right-arm medium pace. He is Montserratian, but was born in Guyana.

In 2006, Montserrat were invited to take part in the 2006 Stanford 20/20, whose matches held official Twenty20 status. Stephney made his Twenty20 debut for Montserrat in their first-round match against Guyana, with their first-class opponents winning the match by 8 wickets. Stephney joint top-scored in Montserrat's innings alongside McPherson Meade, ending it unbeaten on 21. In January 2008, Montserrat were again invited to part in the 2008 Stanford 20/20, where Stephney made two further Twenty20 appearances, in a preliminary round match against the Turks and Caicos Islands and in a first round match against Nevis. Against the Turks and Caicos Islands, he bowled four wicketless over in their total of 67 all out. He wasn't required to bat in Montserrat's nine wicket victory. Against Nevis, he bowled four wicketless overs which conceded 32 runs, while in Montserrat's unsuccessful chase of 185 he was dismissed for 9 runs by Akito Willett.
