= Zhaun Sweeney =

Montserratian cricketer (born 1979)

Personal information
- Full name: Zhaun Queshell Sweeney
- Born: 23 December 1979 (age 46); Montserrat
- Batting: Left-handed
- Bowling: Right-arm medium

Domestic team information
- Years: Team
- 2007/08: Montserrat

Career statistics
| Competition | Twenty20 |
|---|---|
| Matches | 2 |
| Runs scored | 16 |
| Batting average | 16.00 |
| 100s/50s | –/– |
| Top score | 16 |
| Catches/stumpings | –/– |
- Source: Cricinfo, 13 October 2012

Zhaun Queshell Sweeney (born 23 December 1979) is a West Indian cricketer. Sweeney is a left-handed batsman who bowls right-arm medium pace. He was born on Montserrat.

Sweeney played at Under-19 level for the Leeward Islands in 1996 and 1997, making a total of ten appearances. In January 2008, Montserrat were invited to take part in the 2008 Stanford 20/20, whose matches held official Twenty20 status. Sweeney made his Twenty20 debut for Montserrat in their preliminary round match against the Turks and Caicos Islands, but he wasn't required to bat in Montserrat's nine wicket victory. He made a second appearance in the following first round match against Nevis, being run out for 16 runs in Montserrat's unsuccessful chase of 186 by Tonito Willett.
