= Stephney =

Stephney is a surname of English origin. Notable people with the surname include:

- Brian Stephney (born 12 October 1983), West Indian cricketer
- Mark Stephney (born 12 March 1965), Montserratian cricketer
