= Shernyl Burns =

Montserratian cricketer

Personal information
- Full name: Shernyl Curzohn Burns
- Born: 11 October 1991 (age 35); Montserrat
- Batting: Right-handed
- Bowling: Leg break googly

Domestic team information
- Years: Team
- 2007/08: Montserrat

Career statistics
Competition	Twenty20
Matches	2
Runs scored	1
Batting average	–
100s/50s	–/–
Top score	1*
Catches/stumpings	–/–
- Source: Cricinfo, 13 October 2012

Shernyl Curzohn Burns (born 11 October 1991) is a West Indian cricketer and sprinter. Burns is a right-handed batsman who bowls leg break googly. He was born on Montserrat, who he also represented in sprinting at the 2010 Commonwealth Games.

In January 2008, Montserrat were invited to take part in the 2008 Stanford 20/20, whose matches held official Twenty20 status. Burns made his Twenty20 debut for Montserrat in their preliminary round match against the Turks and Caicos Islands. In the Turks and Caicos Islands innings of 67 for 9, Burns ran out both Donovan Matthews and Sabuton John. He wasn't required to bat in Montserrat's nine wicket victory. He made a second appearance in the following first round match against Nevis, ending Montserrat's unsuccessful chase of 186 unbeaten with a single run. In 2008 and 2009, he played at Under-19 level for the Leeward Islands, making a total of six appearances.

Outside of cricket, he competes in athletics sprinting events for Montserrat. He competed for Montserrat at the 2010 Commonwealth Games in India, competing in the Men's 100 metres, where he was eliminated in Heat Six and in the Men's 200 metres, where he was eliminated in Heat Eight. He attended the University of the West Indies.

He competed in the 100 metres event at the 2013 World Championships in Athletics.
