= Dolston Tuit =

Montserratian cricketer

Personal information
- Full name: Dolston Anthony Tuit
- Born: 5 April 1986 (age 40); Montserrat
- Batting: Right-handed
- Bowling: Right-arm off break

Domestic team information
- Years: Team
- 2010/11: Leeward Islands
- 2006–2007/08: Montserrat

Career statistics
Competition	First-class	Twenty20
Matches	1	3
Runs scored	21	47
Batting average	10.50	15.66
100s/50s	–/–	–/–
Top score	17	30
Catches/stumpings	–/–	–/–
- Source: Cricinfo, 13 October 2012

Dolston Anthony Tuit (born 5 April 1986) is a West Indian cricketer. Tuit is a right-handed batsman who bowls right-arm off break. He was born on Montserrat.

In 2006, Montserrat were invited to take part in the 2006 Stanford 20/20, whose matches held official Twenty20 status. Tuit made his Twenty20 debut for Montserrat in their first-round match against Guyana, with their first-class opponents winning the match by 8 wickets. Tuit scored a single run with the bat, before he was dismissed by Mahendra Nagamootoo. In January 2008, Montserrat were again invited to part in the 2008 Stanford 20/20, where Tuit made two further Twenty20 appearances, in a preliminary round match against the Turks and Caicos Islands and in a first round match against Nevis. Against the Turks and Caicos Islands, he top-scored opening the batting in Montserrat's nine wicket victory, scoring 30 runs before he was dismissed by Henry Saunders. Against Nevis, he again opened the batting, scoring 16 runs in Montserrat's unsuccessful chase of 185 by Trevier Smithen.

He later made a single first-class appearance for the Leeward Islands against Jamaica in the 2010–11 Regional Four Day Competition. He scored 4 runs opening the batting in the Leeward Islands first-innings, before being dismissed by Jason Dawes, while in their second-innings he again opened the batting, scoring 17 runs before he was dismissed by Odean Brown. Jamaica won the match by 10 wickets.
