= Davon Williams =

Montserratian cricketer (born 1972)

Personal information
- Full name: Davon Alphonso Williams
- Born: 27 February 1972 (age 54); Montserrat
- Batting: Right-handed
- Bowling: Right-arm off break
- Relatives: Jim Allen (father); George Allen (uncle)

Domestic team information
- Years: Team
- 2000/01: Leeward Islands
- 2006–2007/08: Montserrat

Career statistics
Competition	FC	LA	T20
Matches	3	2	3
Runs scored	138	11	43
Batting average	27.60	5.50	21.50
100s/50s	0/0	0/0	0/0
Top score	48	10	15
Balls bowled	78	–	6
Wickets	0	–	0
Bowling average	–	–	–
5 wickets in innings	–	–	–
10 wickets in match	–	–	–
Best bowling	–	–	–
Catches/stumpings	1/–	0/–	1/–
- Source: Cricinfo, 12 October 2012

Davon Alphonso Williams (born 27 May 1972) is a Montserratian former cricketer who played for the Leeward Islands in West Indian domestic cricket. He played as a right-handed batsman.

Williams appeared at Under-19 level for the Leeward Islands in the 1988–89 season, making a total of three appearances for the team. In 1990, he made a single appearance for Leeward Islands Young Cricketes against Australia Young Cricketers. He later made his first-class debut for the Leeward Islands against Jamaica in the 2000–01 Busta Cup. He made two further first-class appearances in that seasons tournament, against the Windward Islands and Barbados. He scored 138 runs in his three matches, at an average of 27.60, with a high score of 48. In April 2001, he played for the University of West Indies Vice-Chancellor's XI in a minor match against the touring South Africans at the Salem Oval on Montserrat. In October of that year, he made two List A appearances for the Rest of Leeward Islands against Trinidad and Tobago and Jamaica in the 2001–02 Red Stripe Bowl.

In 2006, Montserrat were invited to take part in the 2006 Stanford 20/20, whose matches held official Twenty20 status. Williams made his Twenty20 debut as captain of Montserrat in their first-round match against Guyana, with their first-class opponents winnings the match by 8 wickets. In January 2008, Montserrat were again invited to part in the 2008 Stanford 20/20, where Williams captained Montserrat in two further Twenty20 appearances, in a preliminary round match against the Turks and Caicos Islands, which Montserrat won by nine wickets, as well as a first-round match against Nevis, which Nevis won by 74 runs.

Williams' father, Jim Allen, also played first-class cricket and is considered Montserrat's greatest sportsman, while his uncle, George Allen, was also a first-class cricketer.
