= Errion Charles =

Turks and Caicos Islands footballer and cricketer (born 1965)

Personal information
- Full name: Errion Donaldson Charles
- Date of birth: 7 December 1965 (age 60)
- Place of birth: St Vincent & Grenadines
- Position: Striker

Senior career*
Years	Team	Apps	(Gls)
2002–2003	Police FC		
- Grand Turk FC

International career
1999–2004	Turks & Caicos Islands	7	(0)
- * Club domestic league appearances and goals

Errion Donaldson Charles (born 7 December 1965) is a sportsman from the Turks and Caicos Islands who has represented his nation at international level at both association football and cricket, despite being born on the neighbouring island of Saint Vincent.

== Cricket career ==
In cricket, Charles first played for the Turks and Caicos Islands in the 2003/04 Americas Affiliates Championship against the Bahamas. He later played a single Twenty20 match for the Turks and Caicos Islands against Montserrat in the 2008 Stanford 20/20 at the Stanford Cricket Ground, a match in which he captained the team. He was dismissed for 4 runs in this match by Trevor Semper, with the Turks and Caicos Islands making just 67 runs in their twenty overs. Montserrat went on to win the match by 9 wickets.

== Football career ==
Charles made his debut for Turks and Caicos in the country's first official international game, a February 1999 Copa Caribe match against the Bahamas and earned a total of 7 caps, scoring no goals. He represented his country in 4 World Cup qualification games.
