= Carlton Saunders =

Personal information
- Full name: Carlton Urias Saunders
- Born: 29 October 1957 (age 69); Grand Turk, Turks and Caicos Islands
- Batting: Left-handed
- Bowling: Right-arm off break
- Relatives: H Saunders (brother)

International information
- National side: Turks and Caicos Islands

Domestic team information
- Years: Team
- 2007/08: Turks and Caicos Islands

Career statistics
Competition	Twenty20
Matches	1
Runs scored	–
Batting average	–
100s/50s	–/–
Top score	–
Balls bowled	12
Wickets	–
Bowling average	–
5 wickets in innings	–
10 wickets in match	–
Best bowling	–
Catches/stumpings	–/–
- Source: Cricinfo, 8 March 2012

Carlton Urias Saunders (born 29 October 1957) is a former cricketer who played for the Turks and Caicos Islands. Saunders was a right-handed batsman who bowls right-arm off break. He was born at Grand Turk.

Saunders first played for the Turks and Caicos Islands in the 2003/04 Americas Affiliates Championship against the Bahamas. He later played a single Twenty20 match for the Turks and Caicos Islands against Montserrat in the 2008 Stanford 20/20 at the Stanford Cricket Ground. The Turks and Caicos Islands innings ended at 67/9 from their twenty overs, meaning Saunders, who was due to bat at number eleven, wasn't required to do so. Montserrat went on to win the match by 9 wickets, with Saunders bowling two wicketless overs for the cost of 16 runs.

Saunders made his debut at the age of 50 years and 92 days, making him, as of April 2016, he was both the oldest player ever and the oldest player to debut at Twenty20 level, records which had previously been held by Mario Ford and Venris Bennett, respectively. This record has since been surpassed by several others. His brother, Henry, has also played for the Turks and Caicos Islands.
