= 2010 ICC World Cricket League Division Eight =

- Administrator: International Cricket Council
- Cricket format: Limited overs cricket
- Tournament format(s): Round-robin and Knockout
- Host: Kuwait
- Participants: 8
- Matches: 20

The 2010 ICC World Cricket League Division Eight was a cricket tournament that took place from November 6 to 12, 2010 in Kuwait. It formed part of the World Cricket League competition administered by the International Cricket Council (ICC), the international governing body for cricket.

== Teams ==
Relegated from 2009 Division Seven

- Suriname
- Gibraltar

The remaining six teams were determined by the ICC Development Committee based on prior regional results and other factors. They were:-

- Bahamas
- Bhutan
- Germany
- Kuwait as hosts
- Vanuatu
- Zambia

== Squads ==
Bahamas	Bhutan	Germany	Gibraltar
Gregory Taylor (c); Jermaine Adderley; Asmeid Allie; Jonathan Barry; Gerron Dean; Narendra Ekanayake; Andrew Ford; Mario Ford; Dereck Gittens; Gregory Irvin; Julio Jemison; Shanaka Perera; Marc Taylor; Dwight Weakley	Dampo Dorji; Thinley Jamtsho; Kumar Subba; Dorji Loday (c); Manoj Adhikari; Kencho Norbu; Jigme Singye; Sonam Tobgay; Tashi Tshering; Tandin Wangchuk; Tandin Wangchuk; Phuntso Wangdi; Lobzang Yonten	Asif Khan (c); Ehsan Latif; Farooq Ahmed; Milan Fernando; Shakeel Hassan; Rana-Javed Iqbal; Kashif Haider; Khalid Butt; Andre Leslie; Rishi Pillai; Dilshan Rajudeen; Tarun Rawat; Shafraz Samsudeen; Srinivas Satyanarayana (wk); James Eggleston	Christian Rocca (c); Mark Bacarese; Richard Buzaglo; David Coram; Ian Farrell; Kieron Ferrary; Ross Harkins; Matthew Hunter; Vikram Khatwani; Iain Latin; Kabir Mirpuri; Chris Phillips; Kayron Stagno; Sebastian Suarez

Kuwait	Suriname	Vanuatu	Zambia
Hisham Mirza (c); Abdullah Akhunzada; Abid Chaudhry; Azmatullah Nazeer; Faisal Boota; Haroon Shahid; Irfan Bhatti; Mohammad Akhudzada; Mohammad Murad; Midhun Pakalapati; Jagath Roshantha; Saad Khalid; Sajid Manzil; Saud Qamar	Shazam Ramjohn (c); Carlton Baker; Mohindra Boodram; Troy Dudnath; Arun Gokoel; Giovani Gokoel; Radjeev Jagroep; Sanjeev Mangroo; Brahma Prasad; Terbhawan Ranjit; Anthony Seeraj; Deoraj Sewanan; Vishaul Singh; Patrick Vishram	Andrew Mansale (c); Jelany Chilia; Jonathon Dunn; Patrick Haines; Aby John; Trevor Langa; Edy Mansale; Patrick Matautaava; Lenica Natapei; Nalin Nipiko; Simpson Obed; Damian Smith; Kenny Tari; Frederick Timakata (wk)	Sarfaz Patel (c); Abid Patel; Kafuma Banda; Godfrey Kandela; Gladson Kandela; Ashraf Lulat; Mohmed Mitha; Isaac Mwaba; Allan Nsensha; Tapson Nyirongo; Himal Patel; Imran Patel; Sarfaraz Sopariya; Sharif Yousuf

== Group stage ==
The ICC development committee confirmed the groups on 10 June 2010.

=== Group A ===
Pos	Team	Pld	W	L	T	NR	Pts	NRR	
1	Kuwait	3	3	0	0	0	6	5.868	Advanced to the semifinals
2	Vanuatu	3	2	1	0	0	4	1.047	Advanced to the semifinals
3	Bhutan	3	1	2	0	0	2	−3.348	Parachuted to the Plate and automatically relegated to regional competitions
4	Suriname	3	0	3	0	0	0	−1.410	Parachuted to the Plate and automatically relegated to regional competitions

=== Matches ===
6 November
Scorecard

Suriname; 76 (28.5 overs)	v	Kuwait; 77/1 (7.1 overs)
Terbhawan Ranjit 19 (46); Saad Khalid 4/15 (8 overs)		Irfan Bhatti 46* (29); Terbhawan Ranjit 1/24 (2 overs)

Kuwait won by 9 wickets
Sulabiya Ground, Kuwait City
Umpires: Afzalkhan Pathan (Oma) and Theunis van Schalkwyk (Nam)
Player of the match: Saad Khalid (Kuw)

- Suriname won the toss and elected to bat.
- Points: Kuwait 2, Suriname 0.

6 November
Scorecard

Vanuatu; 337/9 (50 overs)	v	Bhutan; 55 (23.1 overs)
Andrew Mansale 87 (81); Lobzang Yonten 3/52 (8 overs)		Tandin Wangchuk 9* (13); Patrick Matautaava 4/11 (7 overs)

Vanuatu won by 282 runs
Doha Entertainment City Ground, Kuwait City
Umpires: Tony Hill (NZ) and Riaz Chaudhry (Kuw)
Player of the match: Patrick Matautaava (Van)

- Vanuatu won the toss and elected to bat.
- Points: Vanuatu 2, Bhutan 0.

7 November
Scorecard

Bhutan; 182/8 (50 overs)	v	Suriname; 171 (44.2 overs)
Manoj Adhikari 61 (107); Shazam Ramjohn 1/25 (10 overs)		Brahma Prasad 51 (97); Phuntsho Wangdi 3/40 (10 overs)

Bhutan won by 11 runs
Kuwait Oil Company Unity Ground, Ahmadi City
Umpires: John Saloman (Kuw) and Ashwani Rana (Tha)
Player of the match: Manoj Adhikari (Bhu)

- Bhutan won the toss and elected to bat.
- Points: Bhutan 2, Suriname 0.

7 November
Scorecard

Kuwait; 401 (49.5 overs)	v	Vanuatu; 240/7 (50 overs)
Irfan Bhatti 111 (88); Johnathan Dunn 3/14 (1.5 overs)		Johnathan Dunn 56 (80); Mohammad Murad 2/32 (9 overs)

Kuwait won by 161 runs
Kuwait Oil Company Hubara Ground, Ahmadi City
Umpires: Fidel Jaary (UAE) and Mark Hawthorne (Ire)
Player of the match: Irfan Bhatti (Kuw)

- Kuwait won the toss and elected to bat.
- Points: Kuwait 2, Vanuatu 0.

9 November
Scorecard

Bhutan; 31 (15.3 overs)	v	Kuwait; 32/2 (5.1 overs)
Dorji Loday 9 (33); Saad Khalid 6/12 (7.3 overs)		Hisham Mirza 14 (11); Tandin Wangchuk 1/12 (2.1 overs)

Kuwait won by 8 wickets
Sulabiya Ground, Kuwait City
Umpires: Ashwani Rana (Tha) and Theunis van Schalkwyk (Nam)
Player of the match: Saad Khalid (Kuw)

- Bhutan won the toss and elected to bat.
- Points: Kuwait 2, Bhutan 0.

9 November
Scorecard

Suriname; 139 (47.1 overs)	v	Vanuatu; 140/6 (43.0 overs)
Mohindra Boodram 31 (64); Aby John 3/19 (10 overs)		Damian Smith 46 (111); Vishaul Singh 4/42 (10 overs)

Vanuatu won by 4 wickets
Doha Entertainment City Ground, Kuwait City
Umpires: Mark Hawthorne (Ire) and Afzalkhan Pathan (Oma)
Player of the match: Patrick Matautaava (Van)

- Suriname won the toss and elected to bat.
- Points: Vanuatu 2, Suriname 0.

=== Group B ===
Pos	Team	Pld	W	L	T	NR	Pts	NRR	
1	Germany	3	3	0	0	0	6	1.647	Advanced to the semifinals
2	Zambia	3	2	1	0	0	4	1.047	Advanced to the semifinals
3	Bahamas	3	1	2	0	0	2	−1.065	Parachuted to the Plate and automatically relegated to regional competitions
4	Gibraltar	3	0	3	0	0	0	−1.726	Parachuted to the Plate and automatically relegated to regional competitions

=== Matches ===
6 November
Scorecard

Gibraltar; 213/5 (50 overs)	v	Bahamas; 215/3 (44.1 overs)
Kieron Ferrary 52 (63); Jermaine Adderley 1/23 (6 overs)		Gregory Taylor 74 (62); Iain Latin 2/53 (9.1 overs)

Bahamas won by 7 wickets
Kuwait Oil Company Unity Ground, Ahmadi City
Umpires: Fidel Jaary (UAE) and Ashwani Rana (Tha)
Player of the match: Gregory Taylor (Bah)

- Gibraltar won the toss and elected to bat.
- Points: Bahamas 2, Gibraltar 0.

6 November
Scorecard

Germany; 128 (41.2 overs)	v	Zambia; 117 (34 overs)
Rishi Pillai 39 (61); Mohmed Mitha 3/39 (10 overs)		Ashraf Lulat 44 (38); Ehsan Latif 4/43 (8 overs)

Germany won by 11 runs
Kuwait Oil Company Hubara Ground, Ahmadi City
Umpires: Mark Hawthorne (Ire) and John Saloman (Kuw)
Player of the match: Ehsan Latif (Ger)

- Zambia won the toss and elected to field.
- Points: Germany 2, Zambia 0.

7 November
Scorecard

Zambia; 208 (49.3 overs)	v	Bahamas; 132 (39.3 overs)
Imran Patel 38 (76); Narendra Ekanayake 4/32 (10 overs)		Shanaka Perera 44 (46); Gladson Kandela 3/24 (9 overs)

Zambia won by 76 runs
Sulabiya Ground, Kuwait City
Umpires: Tony Hill (NZ) and Theunis van Schalkwyk (Nam)
Player of the match: Gladson Kandela (Zam)

- Zambia won the toss and elected to bat.
- Points: Zambia 2, Bahamas 0.

7 November
Scorecard

Germany; 363/5 (50 overs)	v	Gibraltar; 233/8 (50 overs)
Milan Fernando 151 (140); Matthew Hunter 2/60 (9 overs)		Christian Rocca 99 (119); Shakeel Hassan 4/43 (10 overs)

Germany won by 130 runs
Doha Entertainment City Ground, Kuwait City
Umpires: Afzalkhan Pathan (Oma) and Riaz Chaudhry (Kuw)
Player of the match: Milan Fernando (Ger)

- Gibraltar won the toss and elected to field.
- Points: Germany 2, Gibraltar 0.

9 November
Scorecard

Germany; 258 all out (47.4 overs)	v	Bahamas; 152 all out (31.2 overs)
Rishi Pillai 51 (61); Andrew Ford 4/43 (6.4 overs)		Marc Taylor 45 (59); Kashif Haider 8/25 (8.2 overs)

Germany won by 106 runs
Kuwait Oil Company Unity Ground, Ahmadi City
Umpires: Fidel Jaary (UAE) and Riaz Chaudhry (Kuw)
Player of the match: Kashif Haider (Ger)

- Bahamas won the toss and elected to field.
- Points: Germany 2, Bahamas 0.

9 November
Scorecard

Zambia; 286/6 (50 overs)	v	Gibraltar; 194/9 (50 overs)
Ashraf Lulat 88 (98); Mark Bacarese 3/39 (8 overs)		Kieron Ferrary 105 (124); Gladson Kandela 4/25 (10 overs)

Zambia won by 92 runs
Kuwait Oil Company Hubara Ground, Ahmadi City
Umpires: Tony Hill (NZ) and John Saloman (Kuw)
Player of the match: Ashraf Lulat (Zam)

- Gibraltar won the toss and elected to field.
- Points: Zambia 2, Gibraltar 0.

== Play-offs ==
=== Semifinals and Final ===
11 November
Scorecard

Germany; 185 all out (49.3 overs)	v	Vanuatu; 93 all out (34.2 overs)
Farooq Ahmed 79 (89); Patrick Matautaava 3/27 (9.3 overs)		Andrew Mansale 27 (55); Kashif Haider 4/15 (10 overs)

Germany won by 92 runs
Sulabiya Ground, Kuwait City
Umpires: Ashwani Rana (Tha) and Riaz Chaudhry (Kuw)
Player of the match: Farooq Ahmed (Ger)

- Germany won the toss and elected to bat.
- Semifinal 1. Germany advance to the Final; Vanuatu enter the 3rd Place Playoff.

11 November
Scorecard

Zambia; 63 all out (29.0 overs)	v	Kuwait; 64/7 (26.1 overs)
Abid Patel 27* (77); Mohammad Murad 5/15 (8 overs)		Midhun Pakalapati 18 (53); Godfrey Kandela 2/10 (6.1 overs)

Kuwait won by 3 wickets
Doha Entertainment City Ground, Kuwait City
Umpires: Mark Hawthorne (Ire) and Tony Hill (NZ)
Player of the match: Mohammad Murad (Kuw)

- Kuwait won the toss and elected to field.
- Semifinal 2. Kuwait advance to the Final; Zambia enter the 3rd Place Playoff.

12 November
Scorecard

Vanuatu; 273/5 (48.2 overs)	v	Zambia; 272/5 (50.0 overs)
Andrew Mansale 124* (140); Godfrey Kandela 2/10 (6.1 overs)		Allan Nsensha 82 (98); Aby John 2/44 (4 overs)

Vanuatu won by 5 wickets
Kuwait Oil Company Unity Ground, Ahmadi City
Umpires: Fidel Jaary (UAE) and Theunis van Schalkwyk (Nam)
Player of the match: Andrew Mansale (Van)

- Zambia won the toss and elected to bat first.
- 3rd Place Playoff. Vanuatu remains in 2012 Global Division Eight.

12 November
Scorecard

Germany; 163/8 (50.0 overs)	v	Kuwait; 164/4 (33.1 overs)
Andre Leslie 35 (88); Saud Qamar 5/28 (10 overs)		Saud Qamar 45* (73); Kashif Haider 3/38 (10 overs)

Kuwait won by 6 wickets
Kuwait Oil Company Hubara Ground, Ahmadi City
Umpires: Mark Hawthorne (Ire) and Ashwani Rana (Tha)
Player of the match: Saud Qamar (Kuw)

- Germany won the toss and elected to bat first.
- Final. Kuwait and Germany promoted to 2011 Global Division Seven.

=== Plate ===
11 November
Scorecard

Suriname; 269/7 (50 overs)	v	Bahamas; 233/9 (50 overs)
Shazam Ramjohn 111* (61); Narendra Ekanayake 4/40 (9 overs)		Gregory Taylor 78 (104); Shazam Ramjohn 2/31 (10 overs)

Suriname won by 36 runs
Kuwait Oil Company Unity Ground, Ahmadi City
Umpires: Fidel Jaary (UAE) and Theunis van Schalkwyk (Nam)
Player of the match: Troy Dudnath (Sur)

- Suriname won the toss and elected to bat.
- 5th Place Semifinal 1. Suriname advance to the 5th Place Playoff; Bahamas enter the 7th Place Playoff.

11 November
Scorecard

Gibraltar; 279/7 (50 overs)	v	Bhutan; 223 all out (49.3 overs)
Mark Bacarese 62 (84); Phuntso Wangdi 2/45 (10 overs)		Jigme Singye 53 (71); Mark Bacarese 3/33 (7 overs)

Gibraltar won by 56 runs
Kuwait Oil Company Hubara Ground, Ahmadi City
Umpires: John Saloman (Kuw) and Afzalkhan Pathan (Oma)
Player of the match: Mark Bacarese (Gib)

- Gibraltar won the toss and elected to bat.
- 5th Place Semifinal 2. Gibraltar advance to the 5th Place Playoff; Bhutan enter the 7th Place Playoff.

12 November
Scorecard

Bahamas; 167 all out (35.3 overs)	v	Bhutan; 168/8 (50 overs)
Marc Taylor 58 (46); Jigme Singye 5/23 (6.3 overs)		Manoj Adhikari 58 (113); Shanaka Perera 2/21 (5 overs)

Bhutan won by 2 wickets
Sulabiya Ground, Kuwait City
Umpires: Muhammad Irfan (Kuw) and Riaz Chaudhry (Kuw)
Player of the match: Jigme Singye (Bhu)

- Bhutan won the toss and elected to bowl first.
- 7th Place Playoff. Bhutan and Bahamas relegated to regional competitions

12 November
Scorecard

Gibraltar; 121 all out (41.4 overs)	v	Suriname; 123/3 (27.1 overs)
Richard Buzaglo 40 (63); Giovani Gokoel 3/7 (3.4 overs)		Anthony Seeraj 33 (36); Kabir Mirpuri 1/17 (5 overs)

Suriname won by 7 wickets
Kuwait Oil Company Hubara Ground, Ahmadi City
Umpires: John Saloman (Kuw) and Afzalkhan Pathan (Oma)
Player of the match: Shazam Ramjohn (Sur)

- Gibraltar won the toss and elected to bat first.
- 5th Place Playoff. Suriname and Gibraltar relegated to regional competitions

== Rankings ==
Pos	Team	Promotion/Relegation
1st	Kuwait	Promoted to 2011 Global Division Seven
2nd	Germany	Promoted to 2011 Global Division Seven
3rd	Vanuatu	Remain in 2012 Global Division Eight
4th	Zambia	Relegated to regional competitions
5th	Suriname	Relegated to regional competitions
6th	Gibraltar	Relegated to regional competitions
7th	Bhutan	Relegated to regional competitions
8th	Bahamas	Relegated to regional competitions

== Statistics ==
Most Runs		Most Wickets	
(Vanuatu) Andrew Mansale	288	(Germany) Kashif Haider	17
(Germany) Milan Fernando	246	(Kuwait) Mohammad Murad	15
(Gibraltar) Kieron Ferrary	224	(Kuwait) Saad Khalid	13
(Vanuatu) Johnathan Dunn	207	(Germany) Shakeel Hassan	11
(Germany) Asif Khan	205	(The Bahamas) Narendra Ekanayake	11

== See also ==
- World Cricket League
