= George Allen (cricketer) =

West Indian cricketer (1949–1990)

Personal information
- Full name: George Raymond Allen
- Born: 4 June 1949; Harris Village, Montserrat
- Died: 20 September 1990 (aged 41); Montserrat
- Batting: Right-handed
- Bowling: Right-arm off break
- Relatives: Jim Allen (brother); Davon Williams (nephew)

Domestic team information
- Years: Team
- 1971/72: Combined Leeward and Windward Islands
- 1970–1981: Montserrat
- 1969/70–1972/73: Leeward Islands

Career statistics
Competition	First-class
Matches	9
Runs scored	237
Batting average	18.23
100s/50s	–/1
Top score	53
Balls bowled	1,362
Wickets	15
Bowling average	24.93
5 wickets in innings	–
10 wickets in match	–
Best bowling	3/9
Catches/stumpings	6/–
- Source: Cricinfo, 14 October 2012

George Raymond Allen (4 June 1949 – 20 September 1990) was a West Indian cricketer. Allen was a right-handed batsman who bowled right-arm off break. He was born on Montserrat.

== First years ==
Allen made his first-class debut for the Leeward Islands against the Windward Islands in 1970. Two years later in 1972, he made a second first-class appearance for the team against the same opposition. In that same year, he played three first-class matches for a Combined Leeward and Windward Islands team during the 1971–72 Shell Shield season, against Jamaica, Trinidad and Tobago and Barbados. Later that year, he made three further first-class appearances for the Leeward Islands, against the touring New Zealanders and twice against the Windward Islands. His final first-class appearance in 1973 for the Leeward Islands against the touring Australians. In total, Allen played nine first-class matches, six for the Leeward Islands and three for a combined side. For the Leeward Islands, he scored 179 runs at an average of 25.57, with a high score of 53. This score, which was his only first-class half century, came against the New Zealanders. With the ball, he took 10 wickets at a bowling average of 25.20, with best figures of 3/37. For the combined team, he scored 58 runs at an average of 9.66, with a high score of 24. With the ball, he took 5 wickets at an average of 24.40, with best figures of 3/9. Allen also played minor matches for Montserrat, making his debut for the team against St Kitts in the 1970 Hesketh Bell Shield. His last recorded appearance for his home island came in 1981 against Anguilla in the 1981 Leeward Islands Tournament, with him having made a total of 22 recorded appearances for the team.

== Death ==
Allen died in Montserrat on 20 September 1990. His brother, Jim Allen, also played first-class cricket and is considered Montserrat's greatest sportsman, while his nephew, Davon Williams, has played Twenty20 matches for Montserrat.
