= Brian Stephney =

West Indian cricketer

Personal information
- Full name: Brian Christopher Stephney
- Born: 12 October 1983 (age 43); Suddie, Pomeroon-Supenaam, Guyana
- Batting: Right-handed
- Bowling: Leg break googly

Domestic team information
- Years: Team
- 2006–2007/08: Montserrat
- 2004/05: Leeward Islands

Career statistics
Competition	First-class	Twenty20
Matches	2	2
Runs scored	4	1
Batting average	–	1.00
100s/50s	–/–	–/–
Top score	2*	1
Balls bowled	222	48
Wickets	1	1
Bowling average	105.00	71.00
5 wickets in innings	–	–
10 wickets in match	–	–
Best bowling	1/95	1/32
Catches/stumpings	–/–	–/–
- Source: Cricinfo, 13 October 2012

Brian Christopher Stephney (born 12 October 1983) is a West Indian cricketer. Stephney is a right-handed batsman who bowls leg break googly. He is Montserratian, but was born at Suddie in Guyana.

Stephney played at Under-19 level for Guyana in 2002, making four appearances. Having moved to Montserrat, he became eligible to be selected for the Leeward Islands, making his first-class debut against Jamaica in the 2004/05 Carib Beer Cup, taking what would be his only first-class wicket when he dismissed Xavier Marshall in Jamaica's first-innings. He made a second first-class appearance in that season's competition, against Barbados.

In 2006, Montserrat were invited to take part in the 2006 Stanford 20/20, whose matches held official Twenty20 status. Stephney made his Twenty20 debut for Montserrat in their first-round match against Guyana, with their first-class opponents winning the match by 8 wickets. He ended Montserrat's innings of 115/8 unbeaten without scoring. In Guyana's innings, he bowled four expensive wicketless overs, conceding 39 runs. In January 2008, Montserrat were again invited to part in the 2008 Stanford 20/20, where Stephney made a further Twenty20 appearance against Nevis in the first round. In Nevis' innings, he ran out Carlon Smithen, as well as taking the wicket of Tonito Willett to finish with figures of 1/32 from four overs. In Montserrat's unsuccessful chase of 186, he was dismissed for a single run by Ian Byron.
