= Donovan Matthews =

Guyanese cricketer (born 1971)

Personal information
- Full name: Donovan Anthony Matthews
- Born: 29 October 1971 (age 55); Georgetown, Demerara, Guyana
- Batting: Right-handed
- Role: Wicket-keeper

International information
- National side: Turks and Caicos Islands

Domestic team information
- Years: Team
- 2007/08: Turks and Caicos Islands

Career statistics
Competition	Twenty20
Matches	1
Runs scored	25
Batting average	25.00
100s/50s	0/0
Top score	25
Catches/stumpings	0/–
- Source: Cricinfo, 8 March 2012

Donovan Anthony Matthews (born 29 October 1971) is a Guyanese-born cricketer who played for the Turks and Caicos Islands. Matthews was a right-handed batsman who fielded as a wicket-keeper.

Matthews played a single Twenty20 match for the Turks and Caicos Islands against Montserrat in the 2008 Stanford 20/20 at the Stanford Cricket Ground. He top scored in the Turks and Caicos Islands of 67 runs, scoring 25 runs before he was run out by Shernyl Burns. Montserrat went on to win the match by 9 wickets.
