= Chabbie =

Chabbie may refer to:

- Chabbie Charlery, cricketer
- Chabbie River
