= McPherson Meade =

Montserratian cricketer and footballer

Personal information
- Full name: McPherson Meade
- Born: 16 February 1979 (age 47); Montserrat
- Batting: Right-handed
- Bowling: Right-arm off break
- Role: Montserrat captain

Domestic team information
- Years: Team
- 2006–2007/08: Montserrat

Career statistics
| Competition | Twenty20 |
|---|---|
| Matches | 3 |
| Runs scored | 30 |
| Batting average | 15.00 |
| 100s/50s | –/– |
| Top score | 21 |
| Balls bowled | 50 |
| Wickets | 4 |
| Bowling average | 8.25 |
| 5 wickets in innings | – |
| 10 wickets in match | – |
| Best bowling | 2/10 |
| Catches/stumpings | 2/– |
- Source: Cricinfo, 8 October 2012

McPherson Meade (born 16 February 1979) is a West Indian cricketer. Meade is a right-handed batsman who bowls right-arm off break. He also plays football for the Montserrat football team as a goalkeeper. He was born on Montserrat.

Meade appeared at Under-19 level for the Leeward Islands in 1997 and 1998, making a total of eight appearances for the team. Starting in 2004, Meade played club cricket in England for Chingford Cricket Club. In 2006, Montserrat were invited to take part in the 2006 Stanford 20/20, whose matches held official Twenty20 status. Meade made his Twenty20 debut for Montserrat in their first-round match against Guyana, with their first-class opponents winning the match by 8 wickets. Meade scored 21 runs opening the batting, before he was dismissed by Mahendra Nagamootoo.

Meade continued to play club cricket in England for Chingford, who had by 2007 been promoted to the Essex Premier League. In January 2008, Montserrat were invited to part in the 2008 Stanford 20/20, where Meade made two further Twenty20 appearances, in a preliminary round match against the Turks and Caicos Islands and in a first round match against Nevis. Against the Turks and Caicos Islands, he took the wickets of Henry Saunders and Chabbie Charlery, finishing with figures of 2/10 from four overs. He wasn't required to bat in Montserrat's nine wicket victory. Against Nevis, he took the wickets of Runako Morton and Joel Simmonds to finish with figures of 2/22 from four overs. In Montserrat's unsuccessful chase, he was dismissed for 9 runs by Tonito Willett. Later in 2008, he played for Chingford in the Essex Premier League, making seven appearances during the season. He continues to play minor matches for Montserrat and is the current captain of the team.
