= Jeremy Jones =

Jeremy Jones may refer to:

- Jeremy Jones (freerider) (born 1975), American snowboarder, big mountain riding, Jones Snowboards
- Jeremy Jones (freestyler) (born 1976), American freestyle snowboarder
- Jeremy Jones (pool player) (born 1971), American pool player
- Jeremy Jones (cricketer) (born 1979), Jamaican-born cricketer
- Jeremy Jones (activist) (1950–2023), Australian Jewish leader and activist
- Jeremy Neumark Jones (born 1989), English actor
- Jeremy Bryan Jones (born 1973), American murderer and self-confessed serial killer

== See also ==
- Jerry Jones (disambiguation)
