= List of international cricketers from the Leeward Islands =

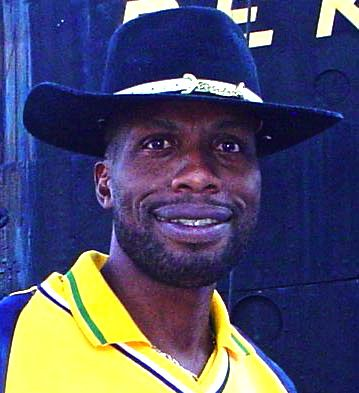
Curtly Ambrose has taken more Test and ODI wickets than any other player from the Leeward Islands.

The Leeward Islands are one of the regions which make up the West Indies cricket team. It has produced international cricketers in all forms of the game—Tests, One Day Internationals (ODIs) and Twenty20 Internationals (T20Is). In cricketing terms the Leeward Islands are made up from the following nations and territories: Antigua and Barbuda, Saint Kitts and Nevis, Anguilla, Montserrat, British Virgin Islands, U.S. Virgin Islands and Sint Maarten. Four Leeward Islanders have captained the West Indies, the Antiguan Viv Richards has made the most Test appearances as captain, leading the side on 50 occasions.

The Nevisian Elquemedo Willett became the first Leeward Islander to represent the West Indies when he played against Australia in 1973, making the first of his 5 Test appearances. Richards has scored more Test and ODI runs than any other Leeward Islander and is the third highest West Indian run scorer in Test matches. Richie Richardson is the next highest in both forms of the game. Curtly Ambrose, also an Antiguan, has taken the most wickets of any Leeward Islander in Tests and ODIs. Andy Roberts has taken 202 wickets, the second highest of any Leeward Islander in tests. Viv Richards and Winston Benjamin are also the only other Leeward Islanders with 100 or more wickets in one day internationals.

== Key ==
- Apps denotes the number of appearances the player has made.
- Runs denotes the number of runs scored by the player.
- Wkts denotes the number of wickets taken by the player.

West Indies captains

Statistics correct as of: October 2022

Name	International career	Apps	Runs	Wkts	Apps	Runs	Wkts	Apps	Runs	Wkts	References
Name	International career	Tests			ODIs			T20Is			References
Elquemedo Willett (Nevis)	1973–1975	5	74	11	–	–	–	–	–	–	
Andy Roberts (Antigua)	1974–1983	47	762	202	56	231	87	–	–	–	
Viv Richards (Antigua)	1974–1991	121	8,540	32	187	6,721	118	–	–	–	
Derick Parry (Nevis)	1978–1980	12	381	23	6	61	11	–	–	–	
Eldine Baptiste (Antigua)	1983–1990	10	233	16	43	184	36	–	–	–	
Richie Richardson (Antigua)	1983–1996	86	5,949	0	224	6,248	1	–	–	–	
Winston Benjamin (Antigua)	1986–1995	21	470	61	85	298	100	–	–	–	
Curtly Ambrose (Antigua)	1988–2000	98	1,439	405	176	639	225	–	–	–	
Keith Arthurton (Nevis)	1988–1999	33	1,382	1	105	1,904	42	–	–	–	
Kenny Benjamin (Antigua)	1992–1998	26	222	92	26	65	33	–	–	–	
Stuart Williams (Nevis)	1994–2002	31	1,183	0	57	1,586	1	–	–	–	
Hamish Anthony (Antigua)	1995	–	–	–	3	23	3	–	–	–	
Ridley Jacobs (Antigua)	1996–2004	65	2,577	0	147	1,865	0	–	–	–	
Carl Tuckett (Nevis)	1998	–	–	–	1	0	2	–	–	–	
Dave Joseph (Antigua)	1999	4	141	0	–	–	–	–	–	–	
Sylvester Joseph (Antigua)	2000–2007	5	147	0	13	161	0	–	–	–	
Kerry Jeremy (Antigua)	2000–2001	–	–	–	6	17	4	–	–	–	
Runako Morton (Nevis)	2002–2010	15	573	0	56	1,519	0	7	96	0	
Omari Banks (Anguilla)	2003–2005	10	318	28	5	83	7	–	–	–	
Austin Richards (Antigua)	2007	–	–	–	1	2	0	1	10	0	
Lionel Baker (Montserrat)	2008–2009	4	23	5	10	13	11	3	0	2	
Devon Thomas (Antigua)	2009–	–	–	–	21	238	2	12	51	–	
Gavin Tonge (Antigua)	2009	1	25	1	5	10	5	1	0	1	
Kieran Powell (Nevis)	2009–	44	2113	0	46	1005	–	1	12	–	
Anthony Martin (Antigua)	2011	–	–	–	9	10	11	1	0	1	
Alzarri Joseph (Antigua)	2016–	22	449	62	54	332	87	7	29	10	
Rakheem Cornwall (Antigua)	2019–	9	238	38	–	–	–	–	–	–	
Jahmar Hamilton (Anguilla)	2019–	–	–	–	1	5	–	1	5	–	
Hayden Walsh Jr. (St Croix)	2019–	–	–	–	22	155	28	38	150	31	
Keacy Carty (St Maarten)	2022–	–	–	–	9	145	0	–	–	–	
Mikyle Louis (St Kitts)	2024–	1	41	0	–	–	–	–	–	–	

== See also ==
- List of West Indies Test cricketers
- List of West Indies ODI cricketers
- List of West Indies Twenty20 International cricketers
