= Marcus Charlemagne =

Saint Lucian-born cricketer

Personal information
- Full name: Marcus Camillus Charlemagne
- Born: 17 June 1978 (age 48); Saint Lucia
- Batting: Left-handed
- Role: Occasional wicket-keeper

International information
- National side: Turks and Caicos Islands

Domestic team information
- Years: Team
- 2007/08: Turks and Caicos Islands

Career statistics
Competition	Twenty20
Matches	1
Runs scored	1
Batting average	1.00
100s/50s	0/0
Top score	1
Catches/stumpings	0/0
- Source: Cricinfo, 8 March 2012

Marcus Camillus Charlemagne (born 17 June 1978) is a Saint Lucian-born cricketer who plays for the Turks and Caicos Islands. Charlemagne is a left-handed batsman who occasionally fields as a wicket-keeper.

Charlemagne played a single Twenty20 match for the Turks and Caicos Islands against Montserrat in the 2008 Stanford 20/20 at the Stanford Cricket Ground. He was dismissed for a single run in this match by Lionel Baker, with the Turks and Caicos Islands making just 67 runs in their twenty overs. Montserrat went on to win the match by 9 wickets.
