= 2009 ICC World Cricket League Division Seven =

Cricket tournament

2009 ICC WCL Division 7
- Administrator: International Cricket Council
- Cricket format: One-day cricket
- Tournament format(s): Round-robin and Knockout
- Host: Guernsey
- Champions: Bahrain
- Participants: 6
- Matches: 18
- Most runs: Jeremy Frith (364)
- Most wickets: Qamar Saeed (14)

The 2009 ICC World Cricket League Division Seven was a cricket tournament held in May 2009 in Guernsey. The tournament was the first stage of qualification structure for the 2015 World Cup as well as part of the wider ICC World Cricket League. The two leading teams of the tournament were promoted to Division Six later the same year.

== Teams ==
The participating teams qualified as follows:

- Bahrain (through 2008 ACC Trophy Elite)
- Gibraltar (through 2008 ECC Division Two)
- Guernsey (through 2008 ECC Division Two)
- Japan (relegated from 2008 Global Division Five)
- Nigeria (through 2008 Africa Division Two)
- Suriname (through 2008 ICC Americas Championship Division One)

== Squads ==
Bahrain	Gibraltar	Guernsey	Japan	Nigeria	Suriname
Yaser Sadeq (c); Imran Sajjad; Zafar Zaheer; Tahir Dar; Qamar Saeed; Naeem Amin; Halal Abbasi; Rizwan Baig; Azeem Ul Haq; Ashraf Mughal; Ashraf Yaqoob; Adil Hanif (wk); Vivek Subramaniam; Shahzad Ahmed (wk)	Christian Rocca (c); Mark Bacarese; Gary De'Ath; Ian Farrell; Kieron Ferrary (wk); Steve Gonzalez; Ross Harkins; Charlie Harrison; Iain Latin; Kabir Mirpuri; Chris Phillips; Rex Purnell; Chris Watkins	Stuart Bisson; Benjamin Ferbrache; Jeremy Frith; Tom Kimber (wk); Ross Kneller; Stuart Le Prevost; David Hooper*; Kris Moherndl; Luke Nussbaumer; Matthew Oliver (wk); Blane Queripel; Mark Renouf; Gary Rich; Lee Savident	Masaomi Kobayashi (c); Gavin Beath; Razaq Cheema; Tatsuro Chino (wk); Patrick Giles-Jones; Takuro Hagihara; Ko Irie; Yuta Matsubara; Naoki Miyaji; Naotsune Miyaji; Richard Laidler; Kenji Murata; Satoshi Nakano; Fumihiko Uegaki	Adekunle Adegbola; Wale Adeoye; Saheed Akolade; Olalekan Awolowo; Olajide Bejide; Endurance Ofem; Joshua Ogunlola; Akabogu Okwudili; Segun Olayinka (wk); Temitope Olayinka; Oluseye Olympio; Ademola Onikoyi (wk); Chimezie Onwuzulike; Haruna Thomas	Shazam Ramjohn (c); Carlton Baker; Mohamed Bhoelan; Charles Douglas; Troy Dudnath; Arun Gokoel; Sanjay Meghoe; Dion Mohabir; Kishen Oemraw; Sanjai Oemraw; Brahma Prasad; Deoraj Sewanan; Vishaul Singh

- David Hooper replaced Justin Meades after Guernsey's second match against Japan.

Umpire	Country
Niels Bagh	Denmark
Paul Baldwin	Germany
Steve Bucknor	West Indies
Louis Fourie	Ireland
Trevor Magee	Ireland
Brian Papworth	Scotland
Richard Smith	Germany

== Group stage ==
Pos	Team	Pld	W	L	T	NR	Pts	NRR	Promotion or relegation
1	Bahrain	5	5	0	0	0	10	2.920	Met in the final and promoted to Global Division Six for 2009
2	Guernsey	5	4	1	0	0	8	1.260	Met in the final and promoted to Global Division Six for 2009
3	Japan	5	2	3	0	0	4	−0.501	Met in the 3rd place playoff and remained in Global Division Seven for 2011
4	Nigeria	5	2	3	0	0	4	−0.758	Met in the 3rd place playoff and remained in Global Division Seven for 2011
5	Gibraltar	5	1	4	0	0	2	−0.873	Met in the 5th place playoff and relegated to Global Division Eight for 2010
6	Suriname	5	1	4	0	0	2	−2.166	Met in the 5th place playoff and relegated to Global Division Eight for 2010

=== Fixtures ===
17 May
(scorecard)

Bahrain; 52/4 (13.1 overs)	v	Gibraltar
Imran Sajjad 25 (25); Rex Purnell 2/10 (4 overs)

No Result
King George V Sports Ground, Castel
Umpires: Niels Bagh and Paul Baldwin

- Rain ended play 14 overs into the 1st innings

17 May
(scorecard)

Japan; 28/1 (7 overs)	v	Guernsey
Tatsuro Chino 7 (8); Blane Queripel 1/16 (3 overs)

No Result
College Field, St Peter Port
Umpires: Trevor Magee and Brian Papworth

- Rain ended play 7 overs into the 1st innings

17 May

Suriname	v	Nigeria

Match abandoned without a ball bowled
Guernsey Rovers Athletic Club, Port Soif

- Match abandoned due to rain.

18 May
(scorecard)

Bahrain; 278/5 (38 overs)	v	Suriname; 117 all out (36.2 overs)
Imran Sajjad 106 (96); Sanjai Oemraw 2/47 (6 overs)		Troy Dudnath 19 (29); Qamar Saeed 3/10 (6 overs)

Bahrain won by 161 runs
College Field, St Peter Port
Umpires: Louis Fourie and Richard Smith

- Reduced to 38 overs per side.

18 May
(scorecard)

Gibraltar; 227/6 (50 overs)	v	Guernsey; 228/6 (49.3 overs)
Kyron Ferrary 90 (115); Jeremy Frith 2/23 (10 overs)		Lee Savident 53 (75); Ross Harkins 3/42 (9.3 overs)

Guernsey won by 4 wickets
Guernsey Rovers Athletic Club, Port Soif
Umpires: Paul Baldwin and Steve Bucknor
Player of the match: Kieron Ferrary

18 May
(scorecard)

Japan; 187/8 (50 overs)	v	Nigeria; 188/8 (48.1 overs)
Ko Irie 55* (96); Joshua Ogunlola 1/28 (7 overs)		Adekunle Adegbola 48 (69); Gavin Beath 3/20 (7.5 overs)

Nigeria won by 2 wickets
King George V Sports Ground, Castel
Umpires: Niels Bagh and Trevor Magee
Player of the match: Adekunle Adegbola

19 May
(scorecard)

Bahrain; 235/9 (50 overs)	v	Gibraltar; 98 all out (38.1 overs)
Adil Hanif 92* (120); Kabir Mirpuri 3/27 (10 overs)		Richard Buzaglo 20 (39); Qamar Saeed 3/20 (10 overs)

Bahrain won by 137 runs
King George V Sports Ground, Castel
Umpires: Niels Bagh and Paul Baldwin
Player of the match: Adil Hanif

- Replay of abandoned match from 17 May

19 May
(scorecard)

Japan; 150/8 (50 overs)	v	Guernsey; 152/3 (38.3 overs)
Ko Irie 49 (83); Gary Rich 2/27 (9 overs)		Jeremy Frith 56* (107); Richard Laidler 1/28 (7 overs)

Guernsey won by 7 wickets
College Field, St Peter Port
Umpires: Trevor Magee and Brian Papworth
Player of the match: Jeremy Frith

- Replay of abandoned match from 17 May

19 May
(scorecard)

Suriname; 260/8 (50 overs)	v	Nigeria; 165 all out (46.4 overs)
Troy Dudnath 92 (94); Chimezie Onwuzulike 3/17 (5 overs)		Adekunle Adegbola 39 (40); Arun Gokoel 3/33 (7 overs)

Suriname won by 95 runs
Guernsey Rovers Athletic Club, Port Soif
Umpires: Steve Bucknor and Louis Fourie
Player of the match: Troy Dudnath

- Replay of abandoned match from 17 May

20 May
(scorecard)

Nigeria; 217/8 (50 overs)	v	Gibraltar; 129 all out (42.4 overs)
Akabogu Okwudili 70* (101); Kabir Mirpuri 6/61 (10 overs)		Kabir Mirpuri 39 (84); Adewale Adeoye 3/19 (6 overs)

Nigeria won by 88 runs
College Field, St Peter Port
Umpires: Louis Fourie and Brian Papworth

20 May

Bahrain; 257/9 (50 overs)	v	Guernsey; 232/9 (50 overs)
Ashraf Yaqoob 101 (116); Jeremy Frith 4/67 (10 overs)		Jeremy Frith 65 (96); Tahir Dar 3/45 (10 overs)

Bahrain won by 25 runs
King George V Sports Ground, Castel
Umpires: Steve Bucknor and Trevor Magee
Player of the match: Ashraf Yaqoob

20 May
(scorecard)

Suriname; 66 all out (30.1 overs)	v	Japan; 67/2 (20.4 overs)
Arun Gokoel 31 (69); Patrick Giles-Jones 7/9 (10 overs)		Gavin Beath 20* (19); Troy Dudnath 1/16 (9 overs)

Japan won by 8 wickets
Guernsey Rovers Athletic Club, Port Soif
Umpires: Niels Bagh and Richard Smith
Player of the match: Patrick Giles-Jones

21 May
(scorecard)

Bahrain; 260 all out (49.3 overs)	v	Japan; 64 all out (26 overs)
Qamar Saeed 75* (60); Patrick Giles-Jones 5/39 (10 overs)		Patrick Giles-Jones 14 (49); Qamar Saeed 3/15 (6 overs)

Bahrain won by 196 runs
Guernsey Rovers Athletic Club, Port Soif
Umpires: Trevor Magee and Brian Papworth
Player of the match: Qamar Saeed

21 May
(scorecard)

Gibraltar; 218/8 (50 overs)	v	Suriname; 179 all out (49.1 overs)
Christian Rocca 50 (74); Shazam Ramjohn 3/33 (10 overs)		Vishaul Singh 60 (72); Iain Latin 6/23 (10 overs)

Gibraltar won by 39 runs
King George V Sports Ground, Castel
Umpires: Paul Baldwin and Louis Fourie

21 May
(scorecard)

Nigeria; 217/5 (50 overs)	v	Guernsey; 218/2 (47 overs)
Endurance Ofem 78* (90); Jeremy Frith 1/25 (10 overs)		Jeremy Frith 101* (128); Saheed Akolade 2/28 (10 overs)

Guernsey won by 8 wickets
College Field, St Peter Port
Umpires: Steve Bucknor and Richard Smith

23 May
(scorecard)

Bahrain; 273/5 (50 overs)	v	Nigeria; 97 all out (31.1 overs)
Ashraf Yaqoob 104* (112); Endurance Ofem 1/18 (3 overs)		Akabogu Okwudili 23 (44); Zafar Zaheer 4/27 (10 overs)

Bahrain won by 176 runs
Guernsey Rovers Athletic Club, Port Soif
Umpires: Louis Fourie and Richard Smith
Player of the match: Ashraf Yaqoob

23 May
(scorecard)

Japan; 277/8 (50 overs)	v	Gibraltar; 198 all out (48.4 overs)
Patrick Giles-Jones 69 (104); Kabir Mirpuri 2/40 (10 overs)		Chris Phillips 37 (46); Takuro Hagihara 3/35 (9.4 overs)

Japan won by 29 runs
College Field, St Peter Port
Umpires: Niels Bagh and Steve Bucknor

23 May
(scorecard)

Guernsey; 315/3 (50 overs)	v	Suriname; 52 all out (21.1 overs)
Jeremy Frith 106 (86); Vishaul Singh 1/20 (10 overs)		Vishaul Singh 10 (15); Jeremy Frith 5/8 (4 overs)

Guernsey won by 263 runs
King George V Sports Ground, Castel
Umpires: Paul Baldwin and Brian Papworth
Player of the match: Jeremy Frith

== Final and Playoffs ==
24 May
(scorecard)

Guernsey; 204/9 (50 overs)	v	Bahrain; 207/7 (46.1 overs)
Benjamin Ferbrache 51 (86); Qamar Saeed 5/44 (10 overs)		Qamar Saeed 55* (60); Gary Rich 3/39 (10 overs)

Bahrain won by 3 wickets
King George V Sports Ground, Castel
Umpires: Niels Bagh and Trevor Magee
Player of the match: Qamar Saeed

- Final

24 May
(scorecard)

Nigeria; 221/9 (50 overs)	v	Japan; 153 all out (48 overs)
Akabogu Okwudili 68 (112); Kenji Murata 3/27 (10 overs)		Ko Irie 39 (57); Olalekan Awolowo 4/36 (10 overs)

Nigeria won by 68 runs
Guernsey Rovers Athletic Club, Port Soif
Umpires: Paul Baldwin and Louis Fourie

- 3rd Place Playoff

24 May
(scorecard)

Suriname; 300/9 (50 overs)	v	Gibraltar; 292/9 (50 overs)
Troy Dudnath 130 (90); Rex Purnell 2/38 (10 overs)		Iain Latin 73 (55); Arun Gokoel 3/55 (9 overs)

Suriname won by 8 runs
College Field, St Peter Port
Umpires: Brian Papworth and Richard Smith

- 5th Place Playoff

== Final Placings ==
Pos	Team	Status
1st	Bahrain	Promoted to Global Division Six for 2009
2nd	Guernsey	Promoted to Global Division Six for 2009
3rd	Nigeria	Remain in Global Division Seven for 2011
4th	Japan	Remain in Global Division Seven for 2011
5th	Suriname	Relegated to Global Division Eight for 2010
6th	Gibraltar	Relegated to Global Division Eight for 2010

== Statistics ==
Most Runs		Most Wickets	
(Guernsey) Jeremy Frith	364	(Bahrain) Qamar Saeed	14
(Bahrain) Adil Hanif	304	(Guernsey) Jeremy Frith	13
(Bahrain) Ashraf Yaqoob	271	(Japan) Patrick Giles-Jones	13
