= Jeremy Jones (cricketer) =

Jamaican cricketer (born 1979)

Personal information
- Full name: Jeremy Garth Jones
- Born: 19 January 1979 (age 47); Jamaica
- Batting: Right-handed
- Bowling: Right-arm medium-fast

International information
- National side: Turks and Caicos Islands

Domestic team information
- Years: Team
- 2007/08: Turks and Caicos Islands

Career statistics
Competition	Twenty20
Matches	1
Runs scored	2
Batting average	2.00
100s/50s	–/–
Top score	2
Balls bowled	12
Wickets	–
Bowling average	–
5 wickets in innings	–
10 wickets in match	–
Best bowling	–
Catches/stumpings	–/–
- Source: Cricinfo, 8 March 2012

Jeremy Garth Jones (born 19 January 1979) is a Jamaican-born cricketer who plays for the Turks and Caicos Islands. Jones is a right-handed batsman who bowls right-arm fast-medium.

Jones played a single Twenty20 match for the Turks and Caicos Islands against Montserrat in the 2008 Stanford 20/20 at the Stanford Cricket Ground. He was run out for 2 runs in this match by Shernyl Burns, with the Turks and Caicos Islands making just 67 runs in their twenty overs. Montserrat went on to win the match by 9 wickets, with Jones bowling two wicketless overs.
