= Henry Saunders (cricketer, born 1966) =

Turks and Caicos Islands cricketer (born 1966)

Personal information
- Full name: Henry Armstrong Eugene Saunders
- Born: 17 June 1966 (age 60); Grand Turk, Turks and Caicos Islands
- Batting: Right-handed
- Bowling: Right-arm medium-fast
- Relatives: Carlton Saunders (brother)

International information
- National side: Turks and Caicos Islands

Domestic team information
- Years: Team
- 2007/08: Turks and Caicos Islands

Career statistics
Competition	Twenty20
Matches	1
Runs scored	0
Batting average	0.00
100s/50s	–/–
Top score	0
Balls bowled	12
Wickets	1
Bowling average	26.00
5 wickets in innings	–
10 wickets in match	–
Best bowling	1/26
Catches/stumpings	–/–
- Source: Cricinfo, 8 March 2012

Henry Armstrong Eugene Saunders (born 17 June 1966) is a cricketer who plays for the Turks and Caicos Islands. Saunders is a right-handed batsman who bowls right-arm medium-fast. He was born at Grand Turk.

Saunders first played for the Turks and Caicos Islands in the 2005/06 ICC World Cricket League Americas Region Division Three against Brazil. He later played a single Twenty20 match for the Turks and Caicos Islands against Montserrat in the 2008 Stanford 20/20 at the Stanford Cricket Ground. He was dismissed for a duck match by McPherson Meade, with the Turks and Caicos Islands making just 67 runs in their twenty overs. Montserrat went on to win the match by 9 wickets, with Saunders taking the only wicket to fall, that of Dolston Tuit for the cost of 26 runs from two overs.

His brother, Carlton, has also played for the Turks and Caicos Islands.
