= Rohan Ash =

Saint Vincent-born cricketer

Personal information
- Full name: Rohan Cornelius Ash
- Born: 18 August 1976 (age 50); Saint Vincent
- Batting: Right-handed
- Bowling: Right-arm off break

International information
- National side: Turks and Caicos Islands

Domestic team information
- Years: Team
- 2007/08: Turks and Caicos Islands

Career statistics
Competition	Twenty20
Matches	1
Runs scored	9
Batting average	9.00
100s/50s	–/–
Top score	9
Balls bowled	9
Wickets	–
Bowling average	–
5 wickets in innings	–
10 wickets in match	–
Best bowling	–
Catches/stumpings	–/–
- Source: Cricinfo, 8 March 2012

Rohan Cornelius Ash (born 18 August 1976) is a Saint Vincent-born cricketer who plays for the Turks and Caicos Islands. Ash is a right-handed batsman who bowls right-arm off break.

Ash played a single Twenty20 match for the Turks and Caicos Islands against Montserrat in the 2008 Stanford 20/20 at the Stanford Cricket Ground. He was dismissed for nine runs in this match by Lionel Baker, with the Turks and Caicos Islands making just 67 runs in their twenty overs. Montserrat went on to win the match by nine wickets.
