= Suriname Cricket Board =

Sports governing body in Suriname

The Suriname Cricket Board (Dutch: Surinaamse Cricket Bond; SCB) is the official governing body of the sport of cricket in Suriname. Its headquarters are located in Paramaribo, Suriname. The SCB is Suriname's representative at the International Cricket Council, and has been an associate member of that body since 2002. It is included in the ICC Americas development region.

== History ==
The Suriname Cricket Board has been founded in April 1931. It is active in Nickerie, Commewijne, Sipaliwini and Paramaribo District.

== See also ==
- Suriname national cricket team
