= Bahamian cricket team in Bermuda in 2019 =

| | Bermuda | Bahamas |
- Dates: 25 – 28 July 2019
| Captains | Dion Stovell | Gregory Taylor |

The Bahamas cricket team toured Bermuda in July 2019 to play a 50-over match followed by a four-match Twenty20 series. The fixtures were part of Bermuda's preparation for hosting and participating in the Americas Regional Qualifying Finals tournament for the 2019 ICC T20 World Cup Qualifier.

The matches in the T20 series would have been the first fixtures with Twenty20 International status to be played by either team since the International Cricket Council announced that all Twenty20 matches played between Associate Members from 1 January 2019 would have full T20I status, although Bermuda had previously played three T20Is during the 2008 ICC World Twenty20 Qualifier. However the matches were not granted T20I status. Bermuda won every match of the tour.

== Squads ==
| Bermuda | Bahamas |
|---|---|
| Dion Stovell (c); Q'Shai Darrell; Okera Bascombe; Onais Bascome; Derrick Brangman; Steven Bremar; Zico Burgess; Deunte Darrell; Allan Douglas; Coolridge Durham; Amari Ebbin; Terryn Fray; Treadwell Gibbons; Kwaisi James; Cameron Jeffers; Kamau Leverock; Mackih McGowan; George O'Brien; Justin Pitcher; Alje Richardson; Macai Simmons; Pierre Smith; Charles Trott; Rodney Trott; T Wilson | Gregory Taylor (c); Whitcliff Atkinson; Jonathan Barry; Marcus Bowe; Rudolph Fox; Dereck Gittens; Gregory Irvin; Mark Levy; Albert Peters; Junior Scott; Orlando Stuart; Ryan Tappin; Marc Taylor |

== 50-over match ==
25 July 2019
11:00
Scorecard

| Bermuda; 269/7 (50 overs) | v | Bahamas; 107 (25.4 overs) |
| Treadwell Gibbons 102* (109); Gregory Taylor 3/53 (10 overs) | | Ryan Tappin 24 (31); Mackih McGowan 4/29 (7 overs) |

Bermuda won by 162 runs
White Hill Field
Umpires: Emmerson Carrington (Ber) and Alex Knight (Ber)

- Toss uncontested.

== T20 series ==
=== 1st T20 ===
26 July 2019
11:00
Scorecard

| Bahamas; 73 (14.5 overs) | v | Bermuda; 74/1 (6.1 overs) |
| Ryan Tappin 25 (21); Dion Stovell 4/2 (2 overs) | | Allan Douglas 39* (18); Gregory Irvin 1/18 (2 overs) |

Bermuda won by 9 wickets
White Hill Field
Umpires: Richard Austin (Ber) and Roger Dill (Ber)

- Bahamas won the toss and elected to bat.

=== 2nd T20 ===
26 July 2019
15:00
Scorecard

| Bahamas; 136/8 (20 overs) | v | Bermuda; 142/2 (16.2 overs) |
| Marc Taylor 60 (41); Charles Trott 3/16 (3 overs) | | Terryn Fray 56 (38); Mark Levy 1/31 (2.2 overs) |

Bermuda won by 8 wickets
White Hill Field
Umpires: Roger Dill (Ber) and Mark McCormack (Ber)

- Bahamas won the toss and elected to bat.

=== 3rd T20 ===
28 July 2019
11:00

| Bahamas; 72/9 (20 overs) | v | Bermuda; 73/2 |

Bermuda won by 8 wickets
Bermuda National Stadium, Hamilton
Umpires: James McKirdy (Ber)

- Bahamas won the toss and elected to bat.

=== 4th T20 ===
28 July 2019
15:00
Scorecard

| Bahamas; 62 (19 overs) | v | Bermuda; 63/2 (9.2 overs) |
| Marc Taylor 13 (23); Derrick Brangman 3/12 (4 overs) | | Allan Douglas 31 (20); Rudolph Fox 2/21 (3 overs) |

Bermuda won by 8 wickets
Bermuda National Stadium, Hamilton
Umpires: Melvin Best (Ber) and Emmerson Carrington (Ber)

- Bahamas won the toss and elected to bat.
