= Chabbie Charlery =

Saint Lucian-born cricketer

Personal information
- Full name: Chabbie Caine Charlery
- Born: 6 March 1983 (age 43); Saint Lucia
- Batting: Left-handed
- Bowling: Left-arm medium-fast

Domestic team information
- Years: Team
- 2007/08: Turks and Caicos Islands

Career statistics
Competition	Twenty20
Matches	1
Runs scored	6
Batting average	6.00
100s/50s	–/–
Top score	6
Balls bowled	–
Wickets	–
Bowling average	–
5 wickets in innings	–
10 wickets in match	–
Best bowling	–
Catches/stumpings	–/–
- Source: Cricinfo, 8 March 2012

Chabbie Caine Charlery (born 6 March 1983) is a Saint Lucian-born cricketer who plays for the Turks and Caicos Islands. Charlery is a left-handed batsman who bowls left-arm fast-medium.

Charlery played a single Twenty20 match for the Turks and Caicos Islands against Montserrat in the 2008 Stanford 20/20 at the Stanford Cricket Ground. He was dismissed for 6 runs in this match by McPherson Meade, with the Turks and Caicos Islands making just 67 runs in their twenty overs. Montserrat went on to win the match by 9 wickets.
