= Jerry Jones (disambiguation) =

Jerry Jones (born 1942) is an American businessman and owner of the NFL's Dallas Cowboys.

Jerry Jones may also refer to:

== Sports ==
- Jerry Jones Jr. (born 1969), American football executive, son of the above
- Jerry Jones (American football, born 1895) (1895–1938), American football player and coach; National Football League player (1920–1924)
- Jerry Jones (American football, born 1944) (1944–2011), American football player

== Others ==
- Jerry H. Jones (born 1939), American political aide
- Jerry Jones Guitars, a guitar manufacturing company based in Nashville, United States
- Jerry Jones, the graphic artist who did the artwork for the computer game series, Catacomb 3-D
- Jerry Jones (singer), singer and songwriter in the experimental rock band Trophy Scars

== See also ==
- Gerry Jones (disambiguation)
- Jeremy Jones (disambiguation)
