= Sabuton John =

West Indian cricketer (born 1976)

Personal information
- Full name: Sabuton Alber John
- Born: 24 March 1976 (age 50); Saint Vincent
- Batting: Right-handed
- Bowling: Right-arm medium

International information
- National side: Turks and Caicos Islands

Domestic team information
- Years: Team
- 2007/08: Turks and Caicos Islands

Career statistics
Competition	Twenty20
Matches	1
Runs scored	7
Batting average	7.00
100s/50s	–/–
Top score	7
Balls bowled	–
Wickets	–
Bowling average	–
5 wickets in innings	–
10 wickets in match	–
Best bowling	–
Catches/stumpings	–/–
- Source: Cricinfo, 8 March 2012

Sabuton Alber John (born 24 March 1976) is a Saint Vincent-born cricketer and footballer who plays for the Turks and Caicos Islands national cricket team and the Turks and Caicos Islands national football team. John is a right-handed batsman who bowls right-arm medium pace.

John played a single Twenty20 match for the Turks and Caicos Islands against Montserrat in the 2008 Stanford 20/20 at the Stanford Cricket Ground. He was run out for 7 runs in this match by Lionel Baker, with the Turks and Caicos Islands making just 67 runs in their twenty overs. Montserrat went on to win the match by 9 wickets.
