= Nesta Piper =

West Indian cricketer (born 1982)

Personal information
- Full name: Nesta Maurice Garry Piper
- Born: 4 December 1982 (age 43); Saint Kitts
- Batting: Right-handed

Domestic team information
- Years: Team
- 2006: Montserrat

Career statistics
Competition	Twenty20
Matches	1
Runs scored	11
Batting average	11.00
100s/50s	–/–
Top score	11
Balls bowled	–
Wickets	–
Bowling average	–
5 wickets in innings	–
10 wickets in match	–
Best bowling	–
Catches/stumpings	–/–
- Source: Cricinfo, 8 October 2012

Nesta Maurice Garry Piper (born 4 December 1982) is a West Indian cricketer. Piper is a right-handed batsman. He was born on Saint Kitts, but later moved to Montserrat.

Piper appeared for a West Indies Development XI against Canada Under-19s in 2000. The following year he played three matches at Under-19 level for the Leeward Islands. In 2006, Montserrat were invited to take part in the 2006 Stanford 20/20, whose matches held official Twenty20 status. Piper made his Twenty20 debut for Montserrat in their first-round match against Guyana, with their first-class opponents winnings the match by 8 wickets. Piper scored 11 runs opening the batting, before he was dismissed by Narsingh Deonarine. This was his only major appearance for Montserrat.
