= List of Turks and Caicos Islands Twenty20 International cricketers =

This is a list of Turks and Caicos Islands Twenty20 International cricketers.

In April 2018, the ICC decided to grant full Twenty20 International (T20I) status to all its members. Therefore, all Twenty20 matches played between Turks and Caicos Islands and other ICC members after 1 January 2019 will have T20I status.

This list will comprise all members of the Turks and Caicos Islands cricket team who have played at least one T20I match. It is initially arranged in the order in which each player won his first Twenty20 cap. Where more than one player will win his first Twenty20 cap in the same match, those players will be listed alphabetically by surname (according to the name format used by Cricinfo).

Turks and Caicos Islands played their first match with T20I status on 17 April 2025 against Panama during the 2025 Men's Central American Championship.

== Key ==
General

- ‡ – Captain
- † – Wicket-keeper
- First – Year of debut
- Last – Year of latest game
- Mat – Number of matches played

Batting

- Runs – Runs scored in career
- HS – Highest score
- Avg – Runs scored per dismissal
- * – Batsman remained not out
- 50 – Half-centuries scored
- 100 – Centuries scored

Bowling

- Balls – Balls bowled in career
- Wkt – Wickets taken in career
- BBI – Best bowling in an innings
- Ave – Average runs per wicket

Fielding

- Ca – Catches taken
- St – Stumpings affected

== Players ==
Statistics are correct as of 20 April 2025.

Cap	Name	First	Last	Mat	Batting					Bowling				Fielding		Ref(s)
Cap	Name	First	Last	Mat	Runs	HS	Avg	50	100	Balls	Wkt	BBI	Ave	Ca	St	Ref(s)
1	Daniel Bourne	2025	2025	1	3	3	3.00	0	0	24	1	1/24	24.00	1	0	
2	Garvin Bruno	2025	2025	2	17	9	8.50	0	0	24	2	2/40	20.00	2	0	
3	Garrett Campbell	2025	2025	1	2	2	2.00	0	0	–	–	–	–	0	0	
4	Jerome Daley	2025	2025	4	87	56*	29.00	1	0	36	3	3/16	10.66	2	0	
5	Earl Henry	2025	2025	1	1	1	1.00	0	0	–	–	–	–	0	0	
6	Sidue Hunter ‡†	2025	2025	4	25	19	8.33	0	0	42	0	–	–	0	0	
7	Robert Johnson	2025	2025	2	5	5	2.50	0	0	18	2	2/16	17.00	0	0	
8	Gansean Kuthalingham	2025	2025	3	7	5*	7.00	0	0	36	1	1/18	33.00	0	0	
9	Anthony McKnight	2025	2025	2	67	40	33.50	0	0	–	–	–	–	1	0	
10	Mario Smith	2025	2025	4	40	17	13.33	0	0	18	1	1/29	29.00	0	0	
11	Damian St Ange	2025	2025	4	17	13	5.66	0	0	66	3	2/10	22.33	0	0	
12	Kareem Jack†	2025	2025	3	8	4	4.00	0	0	–	–	–	–	1	0	
13	Ariharan Kuthalingham	2025	2025	3	37	24	18.50	0	0	30	1	1/18	24.00	1	0	
14	Marlon Turner	2025	2025	3	25	18*	–	0	0	54	2	1/8	4.00	0	0	
15	Daleovaun Hardware†	2025	2025	2	9	7*	9.00	0	0	–	–	–	–	0	0	
16	Ian Ganness	2025	2025	2	0	0*	–	–	–	–	–	–	–	0	0	
17	Smijo Vithayathil	2025	2025	2	–	–	–	–	–	18	2	2/8	4.00	1	0	
