= Andrew Ford (cricketer) =

Bahamian cricketer

Personal information
- Full name: Andrew Robert Ford
- Born: 20 September 1963 (age 63); Bahamas
- Batting: Right-handed
- Bowling: Right-arm medium

International information
- National side: Bahamas

Career statistics
Competition	T20
Matches	1
Runs scored	–
Batting average	–
100s/50s	–/–
Top score	–
Catches/stumpings	1/–
- Source: Cricinfo, 28 May 2010

Andrew Robert Ford (born 20 September 1963) is a former Bahamian cricketer. Ford is a right-handed batsman who bowls right-arm medium pace. He represented the Bahamas national cricket team in 20 matches.

Ford made his debut for the Bahamas in the 2004 Americas Affiliates Championship against the Turks and Caicos Islands.

Ford made his Twenty20 debut for the Bahamas in the 1st round of the 2008 Stanford 20/20 against Jamaica.

Ford represented the Bahamas in the 2008 ICC World Cricket League Division Five, with his final appearance for the team coming against Vanuatu.
