= 2006 ICC Americas Championship =

- Cricket format: 50 overs-per-side
- Tournament format(s): Round-robin
- Host(s): Canada
- Champions: Bermuda (1st title)
- Participants: 13

The ICC Americas Championship is the continental cricket championship for the Americas region, for Affiliate and Associate members of the International Cricket Council in North, Central and South America, and the Caribbean. This is the first year that the tournament is organized in three divisions.

The division three was played in Suriname. This tournament was won by the host and won one spot in division two (played in Argentina. Division two was won by the host. Argentina won one spot in division one. Division one was played in Canada, and was won by Bermuda.

== Division One ==
Division One was held in Canada, commencing on 21 August. Five teams took part: Argentina, Bermuda, Canada (host and holder), the Cayman Islands and the United States. The venues were in the Maple Leaf Ground and the Toronto Cricket, Skating and Curling Club.

=== Points Table ===
Team	Played	Won	Lost	Tied	NR	Points	NRR
Bermuda	4	3	0	0	1	14	1.420
United States	4	2	1	0	1	10	0.485
Canada	4	2	2	0	0	8	1.056
Cayman Islands	4	2	2	0	0	8	-0.257
Argentina	4	0	4	0	0	0	-2.469

== Division two ==
Division Two was held in Argentina, commencing on 3 April. Five teams took part: Argentina (host), Bahamas, Belize, Panama, and Suriname. The venues were St Albans Club and Hurlingham Club in Buenos Aires. Argentina and Bahamas qualified for Wcl5.

=== Points Table ===
Team	Played	Won	Lost	Tied	NR	Points	NRR
Argentina	4	4	0	0	0	16	1.220
Bahamas	4	3	1	0	0	12	2.106
Panama	4	2	2	0	0	8	-0.530
Suriname	4	1	0	0	3	4	-0.681
Belize	4	0	4	0	0	0	-1.825

== Division three ==
Division Three was held in Suriname, commencing on 15 February. Four teams took part: Brazil, Chile, Suriname (host), and Turks and Caicos. The venues were Snellen Park and Axwijk Sports Centre in Paramaribo.

=== Points Table ===
Team	Played	Won	Lost	Tied	NR	Points	NRR
Suriname	3	3	0	0	0	12	2.890
Turks and Caicos Islands	3	2	1	0	0	8	-0.222
Chile	3	1	2	0	0	4	0.030
Brazil	3	0	3	0	0	0	-1.944
