= Jim Allen (cricketer) =

Montserratian cricketer (1951–2025)

Personal information
- Full name: Charles Henry Allen
- Born: 15 August 1951; Harris Village, Montserrat
- Died: 2 July 2025 (aged 73); Montserrat
- Nickname: Jim
- Batting: Right-handed
- Bowling: Right-arm medium
- Role: Batsman, occasional wicketkeeper

Domestic team information
- Years: Team
- 1971/72–1982/83: Leeward Islands
- FC debut: 15 January 1972 Leeward Islands v Windward Islands
- Last FC: 3 March 1983 Leeward Islands v Windward Islands
- LA debut: 16 January 1974 Leeward and Windward Islands v MCC
- Last LA: 26 January 1983 Leeward Islands v Guyana

Career statistics
Competition	First-class	List A
Matches	55	15
Runs scored	3,067	366
Batting average	34.07	30.50
100s/50s	5/19	1/1
Top score	161	102*
Balls bowled	157	6
Wickets	3	1
Bowling average	30.00	6.00
5 wickets in innings	0	0
10 wickets in match	0	0
Best bowling	1/14	1/6
Catches/stumpings	42/1	6/–
- Source: CricketArchive, 26 November 2007

Charles Henry "Jim" Allen MBE (15 August 1951 – 2 July 2025) was a Montserratian first class cricketer who was a part of the World Series Cricket West Indies XI and is considered the greatest ever Montserrat sportsperson.

== Biography ==
Born in Harris Village, Montserrat, to Handsome and Alberta Allen, Jim Allen starred in Montserrat cricket from a young age, making his debut for the Montserrat cricket team in the 1969 Leeward Islands Tournament, and scored his first century for Montserrat against St Kitts cricket team at Sturge Park, Montserrat in 1971.

Allen made his first-class debut on 15 January 1972 for Leeward Islands against Windward Islands at Roseau, scoring one and 82. An attacking right-hand batsman with an unorthodox, open–chest, wide-legs batting stance, Allen was soon considered a more exciting batsman than his Leeward Islands teammate Vivian Richards.

Outside of cricket Allen worked as a bulldozer driver. Allen became the first professional Montserratian sportsperson when he began playing in England during the northern summer, turning out for teams in the Lancashire and Cheshire cricket leagues. Allen's best season was 1976/77, where he scored 559 first-class runs at 50.81, with a highest score of 150.

=== World Series Cricket ===
Allen's good form led to a lucrative offer to join the World Series Cricket (WSC) competition when it commenced in Australia in late 1977. Recommended by West Indies captain Clive Lloyd, it took WSC owner Kerry Packer's representatives two months to find Allen, searching the West Indies and England before finding him.

The only member of the West Indian squad not to play Test cricket, Allen appeared in three SuperTests against the Australians but struggled, scoring a total of 44 runs with a high score of 20.

=== Back in the West Indies ===
Following the end of World Series Cricket, Allen returned to the West Indies for the 1978/79 season where he scored his highest first-class score of 161 against Jamaica. In 1978, Allen was awarded an MBE (Member of the Order of the British Empire) for his services to cricket. Allen sustained an eye injury during a practice session in May 1981 and underwent surgery at Mount Sinai Hospital in New York. He was forced to wear contact lenses and returned during the 1981/82 season, although his runscoring ability fell from prior to the accident. He played three more years before retiring.

Allen made news in April 1982 when he failed to arrive in time for the final of the Geddes Grant/Harrison Line Trophy between Leeward Islands and Barbados, leaving Leeward Islands officials scrambling for a replacement.

Allen scored 3,067 first-class runs at 34.07. He also took three wickets at 30.00 with his right arm medium pace and took 42 catches and a stumping. For Montserrat, Allen scored four centuries.

=== Post-retirement and death ===
After Allen's retirement, an annual lecture series, held on his birthday, was established in Montserrat in his honour. A number of Montserratian artists have written poems about Allen and there are calls to name a local street after him or erect a statue of him in front of the government headquarters in the de facto Montserrat capital Brades. Allen's importance to Montserrat was encapsulated by local writer Professor Howard Fergus, who said "He had made all Montserratians see, feel and know that they, in spite of all, could scale any height of achievement accomplished by those overbrimming with opportunity."

Allen died in Montserrat on 2 July 2025, at the age of 73. His brother George Allen and son Davon Williams both played first-class cricket for Leeward Islands.

== Sources ==
- Fergus, H. (1996) Gallery Montserrat: Some Prominent People In Our History, Canoe Press, Montserrat. ISBN 976-8125-25-X.
