= Gerry Jones =

Gerry Jones may refer to:

- Gerry Jones (politician) (1932–2017), Australian politician
- Gerry Jones (footballer) (1945–2021), English footballer
- Gerry Jones (ice hockey) (born 1937), American ice hockey player

== See also ==
- Jerry Jones (disambiguation)
