= Whitcliff Atkinson =

Bahamian cricketer

Personal information
- Full name: Whitcliff Nathaniel Atkinson
- Born: 17 September 1972 (age 54); Bahamas
- Batting: Right-handed
- Role: Wicketkeeper

International information
- National side: Bahamas

Career statistics
Competition	Twenty20
Matches	2
Runs scored	0
Batting average	0.00
100s/50s	–/–
Top score	0
Catches/stumpings	–/–
- Source: Cricinfo, 28 May 2010

Whitcliff Nathaniel Atkinson (born 17 September 1972) is a Bahamian cricketer. Atkinson is a right-handed batsman who bowls left-arm medium pace and played primarily as a wicketkeeper. Atkinson represented the Bahamas national cricket team.

Atkinson made his debut for the Bahamas in the 2002 ICC Americas Championship against the United States.

Atkinson made his Twenty20 debut for the Bahamas against the Cayman Islands in the 1st round of the 2006 Stanford 20/20. He played his second and final Twenty20 match for the Bahamas in the 1st round of the 2008 Stanford 20/20 against Jamaica; in both matches he was dismissed for ducks.

Atkinson represented the Bahamas in the 2008 ICC World Cricket League Division Five and represented the Bahamas in the 2010 ICC Americas Championship Division 1.

In July 2019, he was named in the Bahamian squad for their tour of Bermuda.
