= Amer Al-Omari =

Qatari footballer (born 1983)

Personal information
- Full name: Amer Ahmed Al-Omari
- Date of birth: 5 January 1983 (age 43)
- Place of birth: Yemen
- Height: 1.80 m (5 ft 11 in)
- Position: Goalkeeper

Senior career*
Years	Team	Apps	(Gls)
2002–2005	Al-Ahli		
2005–2007	Al-Shamal		
2007–2012	Al-Khor		
2012–2014	Al-Ahli		
2014–2015	Al-Shahania		
2015–2016	Al-Kharaitiyat		
2016–2017	Al-Sailiya		
2017–2019	Al-Shahania		
2019–2020	Muaither		
2020–2021	Al-Waab		
- * Club domestic league appearances and goals

Amer Al-Omari (Arabic:عامر العمري) (born 5 January 1983) is a Qatari footballer plays as goalkeeper .
