= Omari Nyenje =

Tanzanian footballer

Personal information
- Full name: Omari Athumani Nyenje Mponda
- Date of birth: 7 November 1993 (age 32)
- Place of birth: Mtwara, Tanzania
- Position: Midfielder

Team information
- Current team: Namungo

Senior career*
Years	Team	Apps	(Gls)
2014?–2018	Ndanda		
2018–2019	Kagera Sugar		
2019–	Namungo		

International career^{‡}
2014	Tanzania	1	(0)
- * Club domestic league appearances and goals as of 1 August 2020 ‡ National team caps and goals as of 1 August 2020

Omari Nyenje (born 7 November 1993) is a Tanzanian football midfielder who plays for Namungo.
