= 2008 ICC Americas Championship =

- Cricket format: List A
- Tournament format: Round-robin
- Host: United States
- Champions: United States (2nd title)
- Participants: 6 of 13
- Matches: 15
- Player of the series: (United States) Sushil Nadkarni
- Most runs: (United States) Sushil Nadkarni (407)
- Most wickets: (United States) Imran Awan (9) (Argentina) Diego Lord (9)

The ICC Americas Championship is the continental cricket championship for the Americas region, for Affiliate and Associate members of the International Cricket Council in North, Central and South America, and the Caribbean. Since 2006, the tournament is organized in three divisions.

The division three was played in Buenos Aires, Argentina. This tournament was won by Turks and Caicos and won one spot in the division two (played in Paramaribo, Suriname. The division two was won by the host. Suriname won one spot in the division one. The division one was played in Fort Lauderdale, United States, and was won by the host.

== Division One ==
Division One was held in Fort Lauderdale, Florida, commencing on November 25. Six teams took part: United States (hosts), Bermuda (holders), Canada, Argentina, Cayman Islands, and Suriname (making their first appearance at this level after winning Division Two. The three venues was Brian Piccolo Park in Cooper City, Lauderhill Cricket Stadium Turf Ground and Lauderhill Cricket Stadium Artificial Ground both in Fort Lauderdale

United States won the tournament won all its games. Sushil Nadkarni (USA) was named the player of the series. Nadkarni was the leader in runs with 407 and Imran Awan (USA) and Diego Lord (Argentina) taken 9 wickets. Suriname finished bottom of the table, and were relegated back to Division Two.

=== Points table ===
Pos	Team	Pld	W	L	T	NR	Pts	NRR
1	United States	5	5	0	0	0	20	2.822
2	Bermuda	5	3	1	0	1	14	1.785
3	Canada	5	3	1	0	1	14	1.714
4	Cayman Islands	5	2	3	0	0	8	−0.719
5	Argentina	5	1	4	0	0	4	−1.253
6	Suriname	5	0	5	0	0	0	−3.698

== Division two ==
The 2008 Division Three tournament, held in Suriname, saw a very close contest, with three teams each finishing with two wins. The host nation defied the odds going into the last game, skittling the Bahamas for just 57 runs, allowing them to jump to the top of the table and qualify for Division One. Troy Dudnauth (Suriname) was named the player of the tournament.

=== Results ===
No.	Date	Team 1	Captain 1	Team 2	Captain 2	Venue	Result
1	3 April	Panama	Soyab Chohan	Suriname	Deoraj Sewanan	Owru Kul oval, Paramaribo	Panama by 31 runs
2	3 April	Turks and Caicos Islands	Ralph Doughty	Bahamas	Narendra Ekanayake	Snellen Park, Paramaribo	Bahamas by 9 wickets
3	4 April	Panama	Soyab Chohan	Bahamas	Narendra Ekanayake	Snellen Park, Paramaribo	Bahamas by 6 wickets
4	4 April	Suriname	Deoraj Sewanan	Turks and Caicos Islands	Ralph Doughty	Owru Kul oval, Paramaribo	Suriname by 112 runs
5	5 April	Panama	Soyab Chohan	Turks and Caicos Islands	Ralph Doughty	Owru Kul oval, Paramaribo	Panama by 95 runs
6	5 April	Suriname	Deoraj Sewanan	Bahamas	Narendra Ekanayake	Snellen Park, Paramaribo	Suriname by 146 runs

=== Points Table ===
Team	Played	Won	Lost	Tied	NR	Points	NRR
Suriname	3	2	1	0	0	8	1.513
Bahamas	3	2	1	0	0	8	1.023
Panama	3	2	1	0	0	8	-0.055
Turks and Caicos Islands	3	0	3	0	0	0	-2.734

== Division three ==
The 2008 Division Three tournament was held in Argentina and again saw an official international debut, this time that of Peru. The tournament was won by the Turks and Caicos Islands who thereby gained a place in the 2008 edition of Division Two in Suriname. Simon Shalders (Chile) was named the player of the tournament

=== Results ===
No.	Date	Team 1	Captain 1	Team 2	Captain 2	Venue	Result
1	11 February	Chile	Simon Shalders	Belize	Dirk Sutherland	Hurlingham Club, Buenos Aires	Chile by 26 runs
2	11 February	Peru	Chris Abbott	Turks and Caicos Islands	Ralph Doughty	Maurice Runnacles Oval, Buenos Aires	Turks and Caicos Islands by 8 wickets
3	12 February	Turks and Caicos Islands	Ralph Doughty	Chile	Simon Shalders	Hurlingham Club, Buenos Aires	Chile by 8 wickets
4	12 February	Belize	Dirk Sutherland	Brazil	Matt Featherstone	Maurice Runnacles Oval, Buenos Aires	Belize by 139 runs
5	13 February	Chile	Simon Shalders	Peru	Ian Hildebrand	Maurice Runnacles Oval, Buenos Aires	Chile by 54 runs
6	13 February	Brazil	Matt Featherstone	Turks and Caicos Islands	Ralph Doughty	Hurlingham Club, Buenos Aires	Turks and Caicos Islands by 5 wickets
7	15 February	Brazil	Matt Featherstone	Chile	Simon Shalders	Belgrano Athletic Club, Buenos Aires	Brazil by 37 runs
8	15 February	Belize	Dirk Sutherland	Peru	Ian Hildebrand	Hurlingham Club, Buenos Aires	Belize by 34 runs
9	16 February	Peru	Ian Hildebrand	Brazil	Matt Featherstone	Hurlingham Club, Buenos Aires	Peru by 63 runs
10	16 February	Turks and Caicos Islands	Ralph Doughty	Belize	Dirk Sutherland	Belgrano Athletic Club, Buenos Aires	Turks and Caicos Islands by 3 runs

=== Points Table ===
Team	Played	Won	Lost	Tied	NR	Points	NRR
Turks and Caicos Islands	4	3	1	0	0	12	1.424
Chile	4	3	1	0	0	12	0.410
Belize	4	2	2	0	0	8	0.720
Peru	4	1	3	0	0	4	-0.782
Brazil	4	1	3	0	0	4	-1.436
