= Akito Willett =

Nevisian cricketer (born 1988)

Personal information
- Full name: Akito Elquemedo Willett
- Born: 22 June 1988 (age 38)
- Batting: Right-handed
- Bowling: Right-arm leg spin
- Relatives: Elquemedo Willett (father); Tonito Willett (brother)

Domestic team information
- Years: Team
- 2004–2009: Leeward Islands
- Source: CricketArchive, 28 December 2015

Akito Elquemedo Willett (born 22 June 1988) is a Nevisian cricketer who has played for the Leeward Islands in West Indian domestic cricket. He is a leg spin bowler who bats right-handed.

Willett made his senior debut for the Leeward Islands in October 2004, aged 16, playing against Trinidad and Tobago in the 2004–05 Regional One-Day Competition. In 2006 and 2008, he played for Nevis in the Stanford 20/20, with his best performance being 2/11 against Montserrat. Willett's first-class debut came during the 2008–09 Regional Four Day Competition, against Guyana. He played one other match during that season, against Jamaica, but has not appeared for the Leewards since. Willett is the son of Elquemedo Willett, a former West Indies international, and the younger brother of Tonito Willett, who has also played for the Leewards.
