= Mansour al-Omari =

Syrian journalist and human rights activist

- منصور العمري
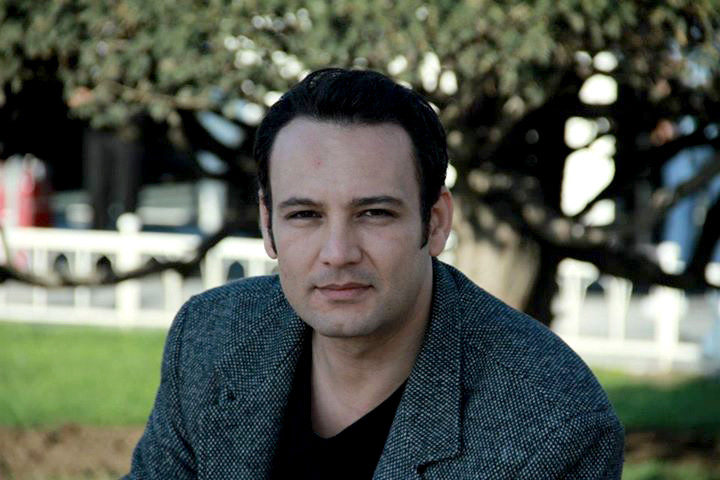
- Born: 1979 (age 46–47); Damascus, Syria
- Occupation: Journalist-Human Rights Activist

Mansour al-Omari (Arabic: منصور العمري, born 1979) is a Syrian journalist and human rights defender, he contributed to the documentation of human rights violations in Syria with the beginning of the Syrian Uprising. al-Omari was born in the Syrian capital of Damascus in 1979 to a middle-class family, and he was raised in Damascus. al-Omari studied English literature at Damascus University. While a student in college he started his translation and journalism work.

== Career ==
In 2010, he was the editor in chief of the English section of Peace Weekly, the Syrian edition of the US magazine, and the official translator of Damascus Short Film Festival, later he played a basic role in conveying the western point of view of the Syrian news to the Arab world, basically writing for Orient net, and other Syrian local media outlets. and also worked a s a translator for HRW, CMFE and VDC.

From 2011, he collected the list of political activists, for the VDC, who disappeared but Syrian government denies any involvement in their disappearance, arrest or detention. The center tries to document and list, but also to find information and answers for families, because, according to Mansour, “The norm in Syria, when a person is arrested, is that their family is afraid to ask questions”

Al-Omari was arrested on February 16, 2012, by the intelligence arm of the Syrian Air Force from the offices of the Syrian Center for Media and Freedom of Expression (CMFE). Fifteen other journalists and activists were arrested on the same day, including Mazen Darwish, the president of (CMFE) and blogger Razan Ghazzawi. Eight of them were released in May 2012; Mansour was subject to forced disappearance with no official statements of his whereabouts or status. until he was released on February 7, 2013.

During this period, he was transferred to various prisons, including nine months under the supervision of Maher al-Assad, brother of Bashar al-Assad. He was regularly tortured during his detention and is one of the few survivors of these torture sessions.

Amnesty International designated al-Omari a prisoner of conscience, "detained solely on account of his peaceful exercise of his right to freedom of expression and association in relation to his work with the CMFE. More than twenty international human rights organizations, including the Arab Network for Human Rights Information, Human Rights Watch, Index on Censorship, the International Press Institute, Reporters Without Borders, and the World Organisation Against Torture, co-signed a letter calling for al-Omari 's immediate release. Catherine Ashton, the High Representative of the Union for Foreign Affairs and Security Policy of European Union, also condemned the arrest, calling on Syria to release al-Omari and his colleagues immediately.

Mansour al-Omari came out of prison with lists of the names of his fellow prisoners copied on scraps of tissue, written with a mixture of blood and rust. He explains that he had this constantly in mind during his detention, "It is my job, my task, to document the names", he claims he simply thought it was his duty to document what he is directly witness to, in order to be able to contact families of detainees to tell them where they are.

== Awards ==
- Mansour al-Omari received the PEC Award in June 2012, The PEC Award is given annually by the PEC committee to reward a person or an organization who worked for the protection of journalists and the freedom of the press, at that time al-Omari was still detained.
- In 2013 he received The Hellman-Hammett Award that recognizes writers for their commitment to free expression and their courage in the face of political persecution.

== Bibliography ==
- Syria Through Western Eyes
- Syrians: Tortured for Daring to Speak out
- Amnesty International, Day of the Disappeared 2013 – Mansour Al Omari
- Human Rights Watch Report- Lost in Syria's Black Hole – Mansour Al Omari
- Aljazeera English Report – Mansour Al Omari
- Front Line Defenders Report – Mansour Al Omari
- Reporters Without Borders Report – Mansour Al Omari
- World Organization Against Torture– Mansour Al Omari
