= Ryan Tappin =

Bahamian cricketer

Personal information
- Full name: Ryan A Tappin
- Born: 1 January 1986 (age 40)
- Batting: Right-handed
- Bowling: Right-arm off break
- Role: Occasional wicketkeeper

International information
- National side: Bahamas

Career statistics
Competition	T20
Matches	1
Runs scored	25
Batting average	–
100s/50s	–/–
Top score	25*
Balls bowled	12
Wickets	1
Bowling average	22.00
5 wickets in innings	–
10 wickets in match	–
Best bowling	1/22
Catches/stumpings	–/–
- Source: Cricinfo, 28 May 2010

Ryan A Tappin (born 1 January 1986) is a Bahamian cricketer. Tappin is a right-handed batsman who bowls right-arm off break and currently represents the Bahamas national cricket team.

Tappin made his Twenty20 debut for the Bahamas against Jamaica in the 1st round of the 2008 Stanford 20/20. Tappin scored 25 runs, ending not out. With the ball he took 1/22, claiming the wicket of Wavell Hinds.

Tappin represented the Bahamas in the 2008 ICC World Cricket League Division Five as well as the 2010 ICC Americas Championship Division 2. Tappin represented the Bahamas in the 2010 ICC Americas Championship Division 1.

In July 2019, he was named in the Bahamian squad for their tour of Bermuda.
