= Suriname national cricket team =

International cricket team representing Suriname

Suriname
- Association: Suriname Cricket Board

Personnel
- Captain: Arun Gokoel

International Cricket Council
- ICC status: Associate member (2011); Affiliate member (2002)
- ICC region: Americas
| ICC Rankings | Current | Best-ever |
| T20I | 86th | 78th (16 Dec 2024) |

International cricket
- First international: Suriname v. Belize (Panama; 23 March 2004)

T20 Internationals
- First T20I: v Panama at Club San Albano, Burzaco; 6 December 2024
- Last T20I: v Mexico at Jimmy Powell Oval, George Town; 15 March 2026
| T20Is | Played | Won/Lost |
| Total | 14 | 3/11 (0 ties, 0 no results) |
| This year | 6 | 1/5 (0 ties, 0 no results) |
T20I home kit
T20I away kit
- As of 25 March 2026

The Suriname national cricket team is the team that represents Suriname in international cricket. The team is organised by the Suriname Cricket Board, which has been an affiliate member of the International Cricket Council (ICC) since 2002 and an associate member since 2011.

Suriname made its international debut at the 2004 Americas Affiliates Championship in Panama, where it placed last. At the 2006 ICC Americas Championship, the team won the division three event, and was promoted to division two for the 2008 edition. Suriname also won that event, and were promoted to the 2008 Division One tournament in the United States, but were immediately relegated after going winless. Since then, Suriname has generally alternated between the first and second divisions of ICC Americas events, most recently placing fourth (out of four teams) at the 2015 Americas Twenty20 Championship.

In the World Cricket League (WCL), the team placed last in the 2009 Division Seven tournament and fifth (out of eight teams) at the 2010 Division Eight tournament, relegating it to the regional qualifiers. Suriname re-entered the WCL system at the 2015 Division Six event in England, and subsequently qualified for 2016 Division Five. However, they later withdrew from the Division Five tournament due to an ICC investigation about the eligibility of some of their players.

In April 2018, the ICC decided to grant full Twenty20 International (T20I) status to all its members. Therefore, all Twenty20 matches played between Suriname and other ICC members after 1 January 2019 will be a full T20I.

== History ==
Suriname became an affiliate member of the International Cricket Council in 2002. Their international debut came in 2004 at the Americas Affiliates Championship, where they came last in the five team tournament. A big improvement came two years later in the new Division Three of the ICC Americas Championship when they won a four team tournament also involving Brazil, Chile and the Turks and Caicos Islands. This qualified them for the Division Two tournament played in Argentina late in 2006, when they came fourth out of five teams, which means that they will keep their Division Two place in 2008.

Suriname placed fifth at the 2009 Global Division Seven tournament and was relegated to Division Eight, where it placed fifth to again be relegated.

=== 2024-present ===
Suriname were supposed to play in the 2023 T20 World Cup Sub-regional qualifier, but did not participate eventually. Suriname then made a comeback into international cricket in 2024, when they played their first ever Twenty20 International match against Panama in the 2024 T20 World Cup Sub-regional qualifier.

6 December 2024
10:30
Scorecard

| Panama; 93/6 (15 overs) | v | Suriname; 83/8 (15 overs) |
| Irfan Hafejee 35* (32); Arun Gokoel 3/14 (3 overs) | | Gavin Singh 39* (38); Dilip Ahir 2/9 (3 overs) |

Panama won by 10 runs
Club San Albano, Burzaco
Umpires: Candace la Borde (WI) and Harry Grewal (Can)
Player of the match: Irfan Hafejee (Pan)

- Panama won the toss and elected to bat.
- The match was reduced to 15 overs per side due to rain.

In the same tournament, the team managed to defeat two higher ranked sides, Cayman Islands and Belize to claim their first-ever win in T20I format.

10 December 2024
10:30
Scorecard

| Cayman Islands; 142/8 (20 overs) | v | Suriname; 143/4 (19 overs) |
| Akshay Naidoo 35 (35); Arun Gokoel 3/15 (4 overs) | | Xaviee Smith 57* (29); Ronald Ebanks 2/29 (4 overs) |

Suriname won by 6 wickets
Hurlingham Club Ground, Buenos Aires
Umpires: Aditya Gajjar (USA) and Harry Grewal (Can)
Player of the match: Xaviee Smith (Sur)

- Suriname won the toss and elected to field.

== Tournament history ==
=== T20 World Cup Americas Sub-regional Qualifiers ===
T20 World Cup Americas Sub-regional Qualifiers records
| Year | Round | Position | GP | W | L | T | NR |
|---|---|---|---|---|---|---|---|
| (United States) 2018 | Did not participate | | | | | | |
| (Argentina) 2023 | Did not participate | | | | | | |
| (Argentina) 2024 | Round-robin | 8/9 | 8 | 2 | 6 | 0 | 0 |
| (Cayman Islands) 2026 | Round-robin | 3/4 | 6 | 1 | 5 | 0 | 0 |
| Total | 0 Titles | 2/4 | 14 | 3 | 11 | 0 | 0 |

=== World Cricket League Division ===
World Cricket League records
| Host/Year | Division | Round | Position | GP | W | L | T | NR |
|---|---|---|---|---|---|---|---|---|
| (Guernsey) 2009 | Division Seven | Round-robin (▼) | 5/6 | 6 | 2 | 4 | 0 | 0 |
| (Kuwait) 2010 | Division Eight | Round-robin (▼) | 5/8 | 5 | 2 | 3 | 0 | 0 |
| (England) 2015 | Division Six | Champions (▲) | 1/8 | 5 | 4 | 1 | 0 | 0 |
| (Jersey) 2016 | Division Five | Qualified; withdrew | | | | | | |
| Total | | 0 Titles | 4 apps. | 16 | 8 | 8 | 0 | 0 |

=== Other tournaments ===
ICC Americas Championship
- 2000–2004: Did not participate
- 2006 (Division three): Winners — promoted
- 2006 (Division two): 4th place — remained
- 2008 (Division two): Winners — promoted
- 2008 (Division one): 6th place — relegated
- 2009-10 (Division two): Runners-up — remained
- 2011 (Division two): Winners — promoted
- 2011 (Division one): 5th place
- 2013 (Division one): 3rd place — relegated
- 2014 (Division two): Winners — promoted
- 2015 (Division one): 4th place — relegated

== Current squad ==
Updated as on 6 December 2024

This lists all the active players who played for Suriname in the 2024 Men's T20 World Cup Americas Sub-regional Qualifier.

| Name | Age | Batting style | Bowling style | Last T20I | Note(s) |
Batters
| Giovani Gokoel | 34 | Left-handed | Left-arm off break | (The Bahamas) 2024 | |
| Vishwar Shaw | 33 | Right-handed | Right-arm off break | (Belize) 2024 | |
All-rounders
| Yuvraj Paul Dayal | 43 | Right-handed | Leg break | (Belize) 2024 | |
| Troy Dudnath | 36 | Right-handed | Right-arm fast | (Bermuda) 2024 | |
| Gavin Singh | 38 | Left-handed | Right-arm off break | (Belize) 2024 | |
| Xaviee Smith | 28 | Right-handed | Right-arm off break | (Belize) 2024 | |
| Vishaul Singh | 39 | Right-handed | Right-arm off break | (Belize) 2024 | |
Wicket-keepers
| Kemraj Hardat | 50 | Right-handed | —N/a | (Belize) 2024 | |
| Vejai Hirlal | 44 | Right-handed | —N/a | (Belize) 2024 | |
| Khemraj Jaikaran | 40 | Right-handed | —N/a | (Belize) 2024 | |
Pace bowlers
| Arun Gokoel | 37 | Right-handed | Right-arm medium | (Belize) 2024 | Captain |
| Abdul Bhikari | 31 | Left-handed | Left-arm medium | (The Bahamas) 2024 | |
| Taarkheswar Ramautar | 29 | Right-handed | Right-arm medium | (Belize) 2024 | |
| Romario Ramjiawan | 36 | Right-handed | Right-arm medium | (Belize) 2024 | |

== Records ==
International Match Summary — Suriname

Last updated 15 March 2026

Playing Record
| Format | M | W | L | T | NR | Inaugural Match |
| Twenty20 Internationals | 14 | 3 | 11 | 0 | 0 | 6 December 2024 |

=== Twenty20 International ===
T20I record versus other nations

Records complete to T20I #3774. Last updated 15 March 2026.

| Opponent | M | W | L | T | NR | First match | First win |
|---|---|---|---|---|---|---|---|
vs Associate Members
| Argentina | 3 | 0 | 3 | 0 | 0 | 11 December 2024 | |
| Bahamas | 1 | 0 | 1 | 0 | 0 | 14 December 2024 | |
| Belize | 1 | 1 | 0 | 0 | 0 | 16 December 2024 | 16 December 2024 |
| Bermuda | 1 | 0 | 1 | 0 | 0 | 7 December 2024 | |
| Brazil | 1 | 0 | 1 | 0 | 0 | 8 December 2024 | |
| Cayman Islands | 3 | 1 | 2 | 0 | 0 | 10 December 2024 | 10 December 2024 |
| Mexico | 3 | 1 | 2 | 0 | 0 | 12 December 2024 | 15 March 2026 |
| Panama | 1 | 0 | 1 | 0 | 0 | 6 December 2024 | |

=== One-day ===
Below is a record of international matches played in the one-day format by Suriname between 2004 and 2015.

| Opponent | M | W | L | T | NR |
|---|---|---|---|---|---|
| Argentina | 2 | 0 | 2 | 0 | 0 |
| Bahamas | 5 | 3 | 2 | 0 | 0 |
| Bahrain | 1 | 0 | 1 | 0 | 0 |
| Belgium | 1 | 0 | 1 | 0 | 0 |
| Belize | 4 | 4 | 0 | 0 | 0 |
| Bermuda | 1 | 0 | 1 | 0 | 0 |
| Bhutan | 3 | 2 | 1 | 0 | 0 |
| Botswana | 1 | 1 | 0 | 0 | 0 |
| Brazil | 2 | 2 | 0 | 0 | 0 |
| Canada | 3 | 0 | 3 | 0 | 0 |
| Cayman Islands | 1 | 0 | 1 | 0 | 0 |
| Chile | 1 | 1 | 0 | 0 | 0 |
| Fiji | 1 | 1 | 0 | 0 | 0 |
| Gibraltar | 3 | 2 | 1 | 0 | 0 |
| Guernsey | 3 | 1 | 2 | 0 | 0 |
| Japan | 2 | 0 | 2 | 0 | 0 |
| Kuwait | 1 | 0 | 1 | 0 | 0 |
| Nigeria | 1 | 1 | 0 | 0 | 0 |
| Norway | 1 | 0 | 1 | 0 | 0 |
| Panama | 4 | 0 | 4 | 0 | 0 |
| Turks and Caicos Islands | 4 | 3 | 1 | 0 | 0 |
| United States | 1 | 0 | 1 | 0 | 0 |
| Vanuatu | 2 | 1 | 1 | 0 | 0 |
| Total | 48 | 23 | 25 | 0 | 0 |

== See also ==
- List of Suriname Twenty20 International cricketers
- Bat-en-bal
