= Omari Allen =

West Indian cricketer (born 1990)

Personal information
- Full name: Omari Sheldon Allen
- Born: 19 July 1990 (age 36); Montserrat
- Batting: Right-handed
- Bowling: Right-arm off break

Domestic team information
- Years: Team
- 2006: Montserrat

Career statistics
Competition	Twenty20
Matches	1
Runs scored	–
Batting average	–
100s/50s	–/–
Top score	–
Catches/stumpings	–/–
- Source: Cricinfo, 13 October 2012

Omari Sheldon Allen (born 19 July 1990) is a West Indian cricketer. Allen is a right-handed batsman who bowls right-arm off break. He was born in Montserrat.

In 2006, Montserrat was invited to take part in the 2006 Stanford 20/20, whose matches held official Twenty20 status. Allen made a single appearance for Montserrat in their first-round match against Guyana, with their first-class opponents winning the match by 8 wickets. He wasn't required to bat in Montserrat's total of 115/8, while during Guyana's innings he wasn't called upon to bowl. As of 2009, he was playing minor matches for Montserrat.
