= Tonito Willett =

West Indian cricketer (born 1983)

Personal information
- Full name: Tonito Akanni Willett
- Born: 6 February 1983 (age 43); Nevis
- Batting: Right-handed
- Bowling: Right-arm medium
- Role: All rounder

Domestic team information
- Years: Team
- Nevis
- 2001–2016: Leeward Islands
- 2014: St Lucia Zouks

Career statistics
Competition	FC	LA	T20
Matches	76	39	22
Runs scored	3,132	612	383
Batting average	25.05	19.74	22.52
100s/50s	0/20	0/4	0/2
Top score	93	61*	86*
Balls bowled	5,528	1,117	198
Wickets	86	28	8
Bowling average	33.66	32.28	30.87
5 wickets in innings	2	2	0
10 wickets in match	0	0	0
Best bowling	5/31	6/19	2/18
Catches/stumpings	30/–	11/–	2/–
- Source: CricInfo, 25 April 2017

Tonito Akanni Willett (born 6 February 1983) is a West Indian cricketer who played for the Leeward Islands. He is the son of Elquemedo Willett, brother of Akito Willett and the cousin of Stuart Williams. He is a right handed batsman and bowls at a right-arm medium pace.

== Playing career ==
Willett was a member of the West Indies Under-19 cricket team in 2001 and was included in the squad for the 2002 ICC Under-19 Cricket World Cup in New Zealand, where he played alongside future West Indies cricket stars Dwayne Bravo, Darren Sammy and Ravi Rampaul.

He made his first-class debut during the 2000–01 Busta Cup for the West Indies B cricket team. His first appearance for the Leeward Islands first class team came in the same competition one year later against the Windward Islands. Willett also played domestic one day cricket for the Rest of Leeward Islands in the 2001–02 Red Stripe Bowl.

Willett also competes for his home island of Nevis in both the LICA three day and one day competitions. He was a part of the Nevis t20 team that competed at the 2006 and 2007/08 Stanford 20/20 tournaments.
