= Elquemedo Willett =

Saint Kitts and Nevis cricketer (born 1953)

Personal information
- Born: 1 May 1953 (age 73); Charlestown, Nevis
- Batting: Left-handed
- Bowling: Slow left-arm orthodox

International information
- National side: West Indies
- Test debut: 9 March 1973 v Australia
- Last Test: 27 December 1974 v India

Domestic team information
- Years: Team
- 1970/71–1988/89: Leeward Islands

Career statistics
Competition	Test	First-class
Matches	5	98
Runs scored	74	1,100
Batting average	14.80	12.94
100s/50s	0/0	0/1
Top score	26	56
Balls bowled	1,326	21,515
Wickets	11	286
Bowling average	43.81	28.43
5 wickets in innings	0	10
10 wickets in match	0	3
Best bowling	3/33	8/73
Catches/stumpings	0/–	66/–
- Source: CricInfo, 10 September 2022

Elquemedo Tonito Willett MBE (born 1 May 1953) is a former West Indian international cricketer who played in five Test matches in 1973 and 1974.

He made his first-class debut for Leeward Islands in 1970–71 at the age of 17, and played his last match in the 1988–89 season. He took 8 for 73 (his best innings figures) and 3 for 44 for the West Indians against Glamorgan in 1973.

During New Zealand's tour of the West Indies in 1972, Willett was considered the best of the many left-arm finger-spinners the New Zealanders faced.

Willett's nephew Stuart Williams has played many Tests and ODIs for the West Indies. His sons, Tonito and Akito Willett also play first-class cricket.

In July 2010, Nevis's primary sporting venue, Grove Park, was renamed Elquemedo Willett Park in his honour. The renaming ceremony was a major event for the island, with several members of the island's administration participating, including the Premier of Nevis, Joseph Parry.

Willett was appointed Member of the Order of the British Empire (MBE) in the 2017 New Year Honours for services to sport.
