= Mahendra Nagamootoo =

West Indian cricketer (born 1975)

Personal information
- Full name: Mahendra Veeren Nagamootoo
- Born: 9 October 1975 (age 51); Whim, Berbice, Guyana
- Batting: Left-handed
- Bowling: Leg break
- Relatives: Rohan Kanhai (uncle); Alvin Kallicharran (uncle); Vishal Nagamootoo (brother)

International information
- National side: West Indies (2000–2002)
- Test debut: 31 August 2000 v England
- Last Test: 9 October 2002 v India
- ODI debut: 16 July 2000 v Zimbabwe
- Last ODI: 3 December 2002 v Bangladesh

Domestic team information
- Years: Team
- 1994–2009: Guyana

Career statistics
Competition	Tests	ODIs	FC	LA
Matches	5	24	102	107
Runs scored	185	162	2,587	719
Batting average	26.42	13.50	19.02	17.53
100s/50s	0/1	0/0	1/7	0/1
Top score	68	33	100	63
Balls bowled	1,494	1,189	24,801	5,382
Wickets	12	18	370	142
Bowling average	53.08	55.44	29.22	25.11
5 wickets in innings	0	0	13	1
10 wickets in match	0	0	2	0
Best bowling	3/119	4/32	7/76	5/23
Catches/stumpings	2/–	6/–	79/–	36/–
- Source: Cricket Archive, 24 October 2010

Mahendra Veeren Nagamootoo (மகேந்திர வீரன் நாகமுத்து) (born October 9, 1975) is a former cricketer for Guyana and the West Indies and of Tamil Indo-Guyanese ethnicity.

In 2005, Nagamootoo took the most wickets (12) for Guyana, winning a regional 50-over title against Barbados at Bourda.

He and his brother have sponsored cricket tournaments in their hometown of Whim, Guyana. In 2019, he was inducted into the Berbice Cricket Board's hall of fame.

== Family ==
Nagamootoo is the nephew of both Rohan Kanhai and Alvin Kallicharan; two of the best ever West Indian batsmen of Indian descent. Nagamootoo has a brother Vishal, who plays cricket for Guyana.

He is the nephew of Moses Nagamootoo, a politician for the Alliance for Change party.
