= Nevis cricket team =

Nevis
- Conference: Leeward Islands Cricket Association
- Association: Nevis Cricket Association

Team information
- Colors: black, green and red
- Home ground: Elquemedo Willett Park

International Cricket Council
- ICC status: Affiliate of Cricket West Indies (full member)
- ICC region: Americas
- As of 2023

The Nevis cricket team is the representative team of the Caribbean island of Nevis. The team is organised by the Nevis Cricket Association (NCA) which is a member of the Leeward Islands Cricket Association (LICA), in turn an affiliate of Cricket West Indies.

Players from Nevis represent the Leeward Islands cricket team in West Indian domestic cricket and the West Indies cricket team in international cricket. Nevis is the smaller island in the Federation of Saint Kitts and Nevis – both islands field separate teams.

== History ==
Nevis was admitted to the Leeward Islands Cricket Association in 1949 and competed in the Leeward Islands Cricket Tournament for the first time in that year. Its first match was played against Montserrat. The current Nevis Cricket Association (NCA) was formed in 1973.

Nevis played in the Stanford 20/20 tournament in 2006 and 2008, briefly turning professional under the sponsorship of American billionaire Allen Stanford. It lost to Trinidad and Tobago in the semi-finals of the 2006 tournament and to Jamaica in the quarter-finals of the 2008 tournament.

== Grounds ==
The main cricket ground in Nevis is Elquemedo Willett Park, previously known as Grove Park. The ground was renamed in 2010 in honour of Elquemedo Willett, a Nevisian who became the first player from the Leeward Islands to represent the West Indies.
