= Turks and Caicos Islands national cricket team =

National team of the Turks and Caicos Islands

Turks and Caicos Islands
- Association: Turks and Caicos Cricket Association

Personnel
- Captain: Sidue Hunter

International Cricket Council
- ICC status: Associate member (2017); Affiliate member (2002)
- ICC region: Americas

International cricket
- First international: 23 March 2004 v The Bahamas at Panama

T20 Internationals
- First T20I: v Panama at Clayton, Panama City; 17 April 2025
- Last T20I: v Costa Rica at Clayton, Panama City; 20 April 2025
T20Is	Played	Won/Lost
Total	4	1/3 (0 ties, 0 no results)
This year	0	0/0 (0 ties, 0 no results)
- As of 20 April 2025

The Turks and Caicos Islands cricket team is the team that represents the British overseas territory of the Turks and Caicos Islands in international cricket.

In April 2018, the ICC decided to grant full Twenty20 International (T20I) status to all its members. Therefore, all Twenty20 matches played between the Turks and Caicos Islands and other ICC members after 1 January 2019 have the T20I status.

== History ==
Cricket is the national sport of the Turks and Caicos Islands. They became an affiliate member of the International Cricket Council (ICC) in 2002 and an associate member in 2017. Their international debut following their membership came in the Americas Affiliates Championship in 2004 when they played the Bahamas. They finished the tournament in fourth place, with their only win coming against Suriname. They played in Division Three of the ICC Americas Championship in 2006, finishing as runners up to Suriname, just missing out on promotion to Division Two. They were invited to take part in the 2008 Standford 20/20, playing one match in a preliminary round against Montserrat. The match, which held official Twenty20 status, resulted in a Montserrat victory by 9 wickets, resulting in their elimination from the tournament. Donovan Matthews top-scored for the team with 25, while no other batsman reached double figures. Henry Saunders took the only wicket to fall in Montserrat's innings. Shortly after, they took part in the 2008 ICC Americas Championship Division Three, which they won to gain promotion to Division Two. In 2010, they took part in the ICC Americas Championship Division Two, finishing fourth but retaining their status in Division Two. The team finally made its official international debut in 2025 playing in the Men's Central American Championships where they also went on to win their first T20 International.

== Tournament history ==
=== ICC Cricket World Cup ===
World Cup record
Year	Round	Position	GP	W	L	T	NR
(England) 1975	Did not qualify, no ICC ODI status						
(England) 1979	Did not qualify, no ICC ODI status						
(England) 1983	Did not qualify, no ICC ODI status						
(India) (Pakistan) 1987	Did not qualify, no ICC ODI status						
(Australia) (New Zealand) 1992	Did not qualify, no ICC ODI status						
(Pakistan) (India) (Sri Lanka) 1996	Did not qualify, no ICC ODI status						
(England) 1999	Did not qualify, no ICC ODI status						
(South Africa) 2003	Did not qualify, no ICC ODI status						
(Cricket West Indies) 2007	Did not qualify, no ICC ODI status						
(India) (Sri Lanka) (Bangladesh) 2011	Did not qualify, no ICC ODI status						
(Australia) (New Zealand) 2015	Did not qualify, no ICC ODI status						
(England) (Wales) 2019	Did not qualify, no ICC ODI status						
(India) 2023	Did not qualify, no ICC ODI status						
(South Africa) (Zimbabwe) (Namibia) 2027	Did not qualify, no ICC ODI status						
Total	0/14	0 Title	0	0	0	0	0

=== ICC T20 World Cup ===
ICC T20 World Cup records
Year/Host	Round	Position	GP	W	L	T	NR
(South Africa) 2007	Did not qualify						
(England) 2009	Did not qualify						
(Cricket West Indies) 2010	Did not qualify						
(Sri Lanka) 2012	Did not qualify						
(Bangladesh) 2014	Did not qualify						
(India) 2016	Did not qualify						
(United Arab Emirates) (Oman) 2021	Did not qualify						
(Australia) 2022	Did not qualify						
(United States) (Cricket West Indies) 2024	Did not qualify						
(India) (Sri Lanka) 2026	Did not qualify						
Total	0/9	0 Title	0	0	0	0	0

=== ICC Americas Championship ===
ICC Americas Championship records
Year	Round	Position	GP	W	L	T	NR
(Canada) 2000	Did not participate						
(Argentina) 2002	Did not participate						
(Bermuda) 2004	Did not participate						
(Suriname) 2006	Did not participate						
(Argentina) 2008	Did not participate						
(The Bahamas) 2009	Did not participate						
(Suriname) 2011	Did not participate						
Total	0/7	0 Title	0	0	0	0	0

=== South American Championship ===
South American Cricket Championship records
Year	Round	Position	GP	W	L	T	NR
(Argentina) 1995	Did not participate						
(Argentina) 1997	Did not participate						
(Peru) 1999	Did not participate						
(Argentina) 2000	Did not participate						
(Argentina) 2002	Did not participate						
(Chile) 2004	Did not participate						
(Peru) 2007	Did not participate						
(Brazil) 2009	Did not participate						
(Chile) 2011	Did not participate						
(Argentina) 2013	Did not participate						
(Peru) 2014	Did not participate						
(Chile) 2015	Did not participate						
(Brazil) 2016	Did not participate						
(Colombia) 2018	Did not participate						
(Peru) 2019	Did not participate						
(Brazil) 2022	Did not participate						
(Argentina) 2023	Did not participate						
(Brazil) 2024	Did not participate						
Total	0/18	0 Title	0	0	0	0	0

=== Cricket at Summer Olympics Games ===
Cricket at Summer Olympics records
Host Year	Round	Position	GP	W	L	T	NR
(United States) 2028	To be determined						
(Australia) 2032	To be determined						
Total	–	0 Title	0	0	0	0	0

== Records ==
International Match Summary — Turks and Caicos Islands

Last updated 20 April 2025

Playing Record
Format	M	W	L	T	NR	Inaugural Match
Twenty20 Internationals	4	1	3	0	0	17 April 2025

=== Twenty20 International ===
T20I record versus other nations

Records complete to T20I #3149. Last updated 20 April 2025.

Opponent	M	W	L	T	NR	First match	First win
vs Associate Members
Costa Rica	2	1	1	0	0	19 April 2025	19 April 2025
Mexico	1	0	1	0	0	18 April 2025	
Panama	1	0	1	0	0	17 April 2025	

=== Other matches ===
For a list of selected international matches played by Turks and Caicos Islands, see Cricket Archive.

== Notable players ==
See Category:Turks and Caicos Islands cricketers

== See also ==
- List of Turks and Caicos Islands Twenty20 International cricketers
