= Montserrat national cricket team =

Cricket team representing British Overseas Territory of Montserrat

Montserrat

Personnel
- Captain: Unknown
- Coach: Jeff Lane

Team information
- Colours: Blue, green
- Home ground: Salem Oval

History
- Four Day wins: n/a
- WICB Cup wins: n/a
- Twenty20 wins: 0
- Official website: Montserrat Cricket Association

The Montserrat national cricket team is the representative cricket team of the British Overseas Territory of Montserrat. The team is not a member of the International Cricket Council, but the Montserrat Cricket Association is a member of the Leeward Islands Cricket Association, which itself is a member association of the West Indies Cricket Board, and players from Montserrat generally represent the Leeward Islands cricket team at domestic level and the West Indies at international level. Montserrat has however played as a separate entity in matches which held Twenty20 status, but has not appeared in first-class or List A cricket. The team was previously coached by Abdiel Hughes, who was appointed in April 2012. Their former captain was McPherson Meade.

== History ==
A Montserrat cricket team first appeared in West Indian cricket in the 1912/13 Hesketh Bell Shield against Antigua at the Antigua Recreation Ground. As the West Indies were yet to be granted Test status, this match did not hold first-class status. The team next appeared in the 1922/23 tournament against the same opposition, before appearing twice more in the 1925/26 competition against Dominica and Antigua, which was the year in which the team was first recorded as playing at Sturge Park in Plymouth. The following year, they appeared in the 1927 competition, playing against Dominica and in the 1932 competition, where they played against Saint Kitts.

There is a long gap between that match and Montserrat's next recorded appearance, which came in the 1969 Hesketh Bell Shield against Nevis. The following year, Jim Allen, considered Monterrat's greatest sportsman, debuted for the island. However, he would not become the islands first first-class cricketer, as William Duberry had played for the Leeward Islands in February 1967. Montserrat took part in the Hesketh Bell Shield and its replacement tournament, the Heineken Challenge Trophy, throughout most of the 1970s and the 1980s. Their participation in the tournament continued into the 1990s, with matches home throughout this period being held at Sturge Park, which has also held first-class cricket on six occasions up to 1994. From 1995, Montserrat was devastated by eruptions from Soufrière Hills. An eruption in 1997 destroyed Plymouth, with the resulting pyroclastic flows and ash fall from the eruption also destroying the main ground at Sturge Park, leaving the Montserratian team without first-class facilities.

However, the team continued to play on in regional tournaments in the late 1990s. By 2000, the team had a new home ground, the Salem Oval at Salem, where first-class cricket has since returned to on three occasions. Most notably, the Salem cricket ground was host to an International ODI match between the West Indies and South Africa on April 12, 2001. Having played in regional tournaments throughout the early to mid 2000s, Montserrat were invited to take part in the 2006 Stanford 20/20, whose matches held official Twenty20 status. Allan Stanford gave US$100,000 for their participation. They played one match in the tournament against Guyana, which they lost to their first-class opponents by 8 wickets, resulting in their elimination from the tournament. Two years later, they were invited to take part in the 2008 Stanford 20/20, playing and defeating the Turks and Caicos Islands in a preliminary match, before losing to Nevis in the following round. In that same year, Lionel Baker became the first Montserratian to play One Day International and Test cricket for the West Indies.

== Notable players ==
See List of Montserrat Twenty20 players and Category:Montserratian cricketers
