= 2023 Global T20 Canada =

Third edition of the Global T20 Canada

- Dates: 20 July – 6 August 2023
- Administrator: Cricket Canada
- Cricket format: Twenty20
- Tournament format(s): Round-robin and playoffs
- Champions: Montreal Tigers (1st title)
- Participants: 6
- Matches: 25
- Player of the series: Sherfane Rutherford (Montreal Tigers)
- Most runs: Chris Lynn (Montreal Tigers) (234)
- Most wickets: Matthew Forde (Surrey Jaguars) (15); Junaid Siddique (Vancouver Knights) (15)
- Official website: www.gt20.ca

The 2023 Global T20 Canada was the third edition of Global T20 Canada, a Twenty20 professional cricket tournament that was played at the TD Cricket Arena in Brampton, Ontario, Canada. The tournament began on 20 July 2023, and concluded on 6 August 2023. It was the first time the tournament has been held since 2019, as subsequent editions were cancelled due to the COVID-19 pandemic.

In the final, Montreal Tigers defeated Surrey Jaguars by 5 wickets to win their first title.

== Background ==
The tournament is being held for the first time since 2019; the third Global T20 Canada tournament was originally scheduled to be hosted in 2020, but was cancelled due to the COVID-19 pandemic in Canada. Organizers announced plans to re-locate the tournament to the Kinrara Academy Oval in Kuala Lumpur, Malaysia for 2021, but it was once again cancelled due to COVID-19.

On 16 May 2023, it was officially announced that Global T20 Canada would return for 2023, being held from 20 July to 6 August at TD Cricket Arena at CAA Centre in Brampton. Two new teams, the Surrey Jaguars and Mississauga Panthers, were announced to replace the Edmonton Royals and Winnipeg Hawks. The player draft was held on 14 June 2023, from Mumbai, with each team given a salary cap of $579,500. The availability of Pakistani players was impacted by Pakistan's test series against Sri Lanka in late July, which was expected to conflict with the tournament; it was expected that players named to the squad for the tests would not be released to participate in GT20.

== Teams and squads ==
The following teams, squads and coaches were announced for the tournament. Each team will include two "marquee" players and three Canadian players from the national team, as well as three emerging Canadian players.

| Team | Debut | Captain | Coach |
|---|---|---|---|
| Brampton Wolves | 2019 | Tim Southee | Shane Bond |
| Mississauga Panthers | 2023 | Shoaib Malik | Lance Klusener |
| Montreal Tigers | 2018 | Chris Lynn | Dav Whatmore |
| Toronto Nationals | 2018 | Hamza Tariq | Aaqib Javed |
| Surrey Jaguars | 2023 | Iftikhar Ahmed | Lalchand Rajput |
| Vancouver Knights | 2018 | Rassie van der Dussen | Donovan Miller |

=== Squads ===
| Surrey Jaguars | Mississauga Panthers | Brampton Wolves | Montreal Tigers | Toronto Nationals | Vancouver Knights |
|---|---|---|---|---|---|
| Iftikhar Ahmed (c); Alex Hales; ~~Jason Behrendorff~~; ~~Mohammad Wasim Jr~~; Nathan Coulter-Nile; Litton Das; ~~Karim Janat~~; Ben Cutting; Mohammad Haris; Sandeep Lamichane; Ayaan Khan; Jatinder Singh; Bernard Scholtz; Pargat Singh; Dilon Heyliger; Ammar Khalid; Sunny Matharu; Sheel Patel; Kairav Sharma; Matthew Forde; Spencer Johnson; ~~Afif Hossain~~ | Shoaib Malik (c); Chris Gayle; Azam Khan; James Neesham; Cameron Delport; ~~Shahnawaz Dahani~~; Tom Cooper; Cecil Pervez; Jaskarandeep Singh Buttar; Navneet Dhaliwal; Nikhil Dutta; Shreyas Movva; Parveen Kumar; Mihir Patel; Ethan Gibson; Zahoor Khan; Usman Qadir | Tim Southee (c); Harbhajan Singh; Colin de Grandhomme; Mark Chapman; ~~Usama Mir~~; Hussain Talat; Usman Khan; Logan van Beek; Jan Frylinck; Max O'Dowd; Jeremy Gordon; Aaron Johnson; Rizwan Cheema; Shahid Ahamdzai; Rishiv Joshi; Gurpal Singh Sandhu; Jan Frylinck; Chris Green | Chris Lynn (c); Andre Russell; Shakib Al Hasan; Shrefane Rutherford; Carlos Brathwaite; Abbas Afridi; Zahir Khan; Muhammad Waseem; Akif Raja; Aayan Khan; Dipendra Airee; Kaleem Sana; Srimantha Wijeratne; Matthew Spoors; Bhupendra Singh; Dilpreet Bajwa; Anoop Chima | Hamza Tariq (c); Colin Munro; Shahid Afridi; Fazalhaq Farooqi; Zaman Khan; Saim Ayub; ~~Abdullah Shafique~~; Gerhard Erasmus; Sikandar Raza; JJ Smit; Farhan Malik; Saad Bin Zafar; Nicholas Kirton; Armaan Kapoor; Sarmad Anwar; Rommel Shahzad; Udhaya Bhagwan; Faheem Ashraf; Darren Bravo | Rassie van der Dussen (c); Mohammad Rizwan; Vriitya Aravind; Fakhar Zaman; ~~Naveen-ul-Haq~~; Reeza Hendricks; Corbin Bosch; Najibullah Zadran; Kartik Meiyappan; Ruben Trumpelmann; Junaid Siddique; Ravinderpal Singh; Harsh Thaker; Rayyan Pathan; Nawab Singh; Muhammad Kamal; Kanwarpal Tathgur; Fabian Allen |

In June 2023, Karim Janat and Jason Behrendorff withdrew from the tournament and were replaced by Ben Cutting and Mohammad Wasim Jr.

== Points table ==
The tournament will follow a round-robin format in the league stage wherein each team plays seven games, and the top four teams will qualify for the playoffs.

| Pos | Team | Pld | W | L | T | NR | Pts | NRR |
|---|---|---|---|---|---|---|---|---|
| 1 | Surrey Jaguars | 7 | 4 | 1 | 0 | 2 | 10 | 1.669 |
| 2 | Vancouver Knights | 7 | 4 | 2 | 0 | 1 | 9 | 0.600 |
| 3 | Montreal Tigers | 7 | 4 | 2 | 0 | 1 | 9 | 0.312 |
| 4 | Brampton Wolves | 7 | 3 | 2 | 0 | 2 | 8 | 0.360 |
| 5 | Toronto Nationals | 7 | 2 | 4 | 0 | 1 | 5 | −0.116 |
| 6 | Mississauga Panthers | 7 | 0 | 6 | 0 | 1 | 1 | −2.756 |

Source: ESPNcricinfo

Advanced to the Qualifier

Advanced to the Eliminator

== Fixtures ==
The tournament fixture was announced on 27 June 2023.

Match 1
20 July 2023
15:30 (D/N)
Scorecard

| Mississauga Panthers; 121 (20 overs) | v | Brampton Wolves; 99/1 (9 overs) |
| Azam Khan 65 (55); Logan van Beek 4/12 (4 overs) | | Aaron Johnson 48* (26); Zahoor Khan 1/14 (1 overs) |

Brampton Wolves won by 52 runs (DLS method)
TD Cricket Arena, Brampton
Umpires: Arnold Maddela (Can) and Leslie Reifer (WI)
Player of the match: Logan van Beek (Brampton Wolves)

- Brampton Wolves won the toss and elected to field.
- No further play was possible due to bad light

Match 2
21 July 2023
11:00
Scorecard

| Toronto Nationals; 151/3 (15 overs) | v | Vancouver Knights; 142/4 (15 overs) |
| Colin Munro 78* (45); Corbin Bosch 1/25 (3 overs) | | Rassie van der Dussen 51 (24); Gerhard Erasmus 2/26 (3 overs) |

Toronto Nationals won by 9 runs
TD Cricket Arena, Brampton
Umpires: Bijal Patel (Can) and Carl Tuckett (WI)
Player of the match: Colin Munro (Toronto Nationals)

- Vancouver Knights won the toss and elected to field.
- The match was reduced to 15 overs per side due to rain.

Match 3
21 July 2023
15:30 (D/N)
Scorecard

| Surrey Jaguars; 136/6 (20 overs) | v | Montreal Tigers; 141/5 (18.3 overs) |
| Iftikhar Ahmed 40* (44); Shakib Al Hasan 3/18 (4 overs) | | Dipendra Singh Airee 28 (22); Sandeep Lamichhane 2/17 (4 overs) |

Montreal Tigers won by 5 wickets
TD Cricket Arena, Brampton
Umpires: Masudur Rahman (Ban) and Leslie Reifer (WI)
Player of the match: Dilpreet Bajwa (Montreal Tigers)

- Montreal Tigers won the toss and elected to field.

Match 4
22 July 2023
11:00
Scorecard

| Mississauga Panthers; 158/6 (20 overs) | v | Vancouver Knights; 159/5 (20 overs) |
| Azam Khan 64 (35); Corbin Bosch 2/23 (4 overs) | | Harsh Thaker 75* (54); Parveen Kumar 2/29 (4 overs) |

Vancouver Knights won by 5 wickets
TD Cricket Arena, Brampton
Umpires: Masudur Rahman (Ban) and Rohan Shah (Can)
Player of the match: Harsh Thaker (Vancouver Knights)

- Vancouver Knights won the toss and elected to field.

Match 5
22 July 2023
15:30 (D/N)
Scorecard

| Toronto Nationals; 142/8 (20 overs) | v | Brampton Wolves; 146/9 (19.5 overs) |
| Nicholas Kirton 50 (40); Logan van Beek 3/27 (4 overs) | | Hussain Talat 44 (33); Zaman Khan 3/24 (4 overs) |

Brampton Wolves won by 1 wicket
TD Cricket Arena, Brampton
Umpires: Bijal Patel (Can) and Carl Tuckett (WI)
Player of the match: Hussain Talat (Brampton Wolves)

- Toronto Nationals won the toss and elected to bat.

Match 6
23 July 2023
11:00
Scorecard

| Mississauga Panthers; 140/6 (20 overs) | v | Montreal Tigers; 141/3 (15.5 overs) |
| James Neesham 54* (35); Kaleem Sana 3/8 (4 overs) | | Chris Lynn 64* (45); Jaskaran Singh 1/12 (1 over) |

Montreal Tigers won by 7 wickets
TD Cricket Arena, Brampton
Umpires: Bijal Patel (Can) and Leslie Reifer (WI)
Player of the match: Kaleem Sana (Montreal Tigers)

- Montreal Tigers won the toss and elected to field.

Match 7
23 July 2023
15:30 (D/N)
Scorecard

| Brampton Wolves; 50/3 (7.2 overs) | v | Surrey Jaguars |
| Usman Khan 29 (26); Matthew Forde 1/6 (2 overs) |

No result
TD Cricket Arena, Brampton
Umpires: Masudur Rahman (Ban) and Carl Tuckett (WI)

- Surrey Jaguars won the toss and elected to bat.
- No further play was possible due to rain.

Match 8
25 July 2023
11:00
Scorecard

| Surrey Jaguars; 141/6 (18 overs) | v | Toronto Nationals; 121/9 (18 overs) |
| Iftikhar Ahmed 47 (35); Saad Bin Zafar 2/14 (4 overs) | | Colin Munro 43 (27); Matthew Forde 4/29 (4 overs) |

Surrey Jaguars won by 20 runs
TD Cricket Arena, Brampton
Umpires: Arnold Maddela (Can) and Masudur Rahman (Ban)
Player of the match: Matthew Forde (Surrey Jaguars)

- Toronto Nationals won the toss and elected to field.
- The match was reduced to 18 overs per side due to rain.

Match 9
25 July 2023
15:30 (D/N)
Scorecard

| Vancouver Knights; 149/4 (20 overs) | v | Montreal Tigers; 153/4 (18.1 overs) |
| Fakhar Zaman 73 (53); Carlos Brathwaite 2/20 (4 overs) | | Sherfane Rutherford 84* (53); Fabian Allen 2/18 (2 overs) |

Montreal Tigers won by 6 wickets
TD Cricket Arena, Brampton
Umpires: Arnold Maddela (Can) and Masudur Rahman (Ban)
Player of the match: Sherfane Rutherford (Montreal Tigers)

- Montreal Tigers won the toss and elected to field.

Match 10
26 July 2023
11:00
Scorecard

| Mississauga Panthers; 115/9 (20 overs) | v | Toronto Nationals; 118/4 (13.2 overs) |
| Shoaib Malik 37 (37); Saad Bin Zafar 3/31 (4 overs) | | Colin Munro 67 (31); Nikhil Dutta 2/36 (4 overs) |

Toronto Nationals won by 6 wickets
TD Cricket Arena, Brampton
Umpires: Leslie Reifer (WI) and Rohan Shah (Can)
Player of the match: Colin Munro (Toronto Nationals)

- Toronto Nationals won the toss and elected to field.

Match 11
26 July 2023
15:30 (D/N)
Scorecard

| Brampton Wolves; 143 (19.5 overs) | v | Montreal Tigers; 128 (19.1 overs) |
| Colin de Grandhomme 56 (40); Aayan Afzal Khan 4/21 (4 overs) | | Shakib Al Hasan 28 (21); Logan van Beek 3/20 (4 overs) |

Brampton Wolves won by 15 runs
TD Cricket Arena, Brampton
Umpires: Bijal Patel (Can) and Masudur Rahman (Ban)
Player of the match: Colin de Grandhomme (Brampton Wolves)

- Montreal Tigers won the toss and elected to field.

Match 12
28 July 2023
11:00
Scorecard

| Brampton Wolves; 129/9 (20 overs) | v | Vancouver Knights; 133/1 (17.1 overs) |
| Chris Green 23 (24); Ruben Trumpelmann 4/25 (4 overs) | | Mohammad Rizwan 52* (42); Logan van Beek 1/18 (3 overs) |

Vancouver Knights won by 9 wickets
TD Cricket Arena, Brampton
Umpires: Leslie Reifer (WI) and Carl Tuckett (WI)
Player of the match: Ruben Trumpelmann (Vancouver Knights)

- Vancouver Knights won the toss and elected to field.

Match 13
28 July 2023
15:30 (D/N)
Scorecard

| Surrey Jaguars; 164/6 (20 overs) | v | Mississauga Panthers; 109 (17 overs) |
| Jatinder Singh 57 (45); Zahoor Khan 3/36 (4 overs) | | Cameron Delport 33 (21); Sandeep Lamichhane 3/18 (3 overs) |

Surrey Jaguars won by 55 runs
TD Cricket Arena, Brampton
Umpires: Arnold Maddela (Can) and Bijal Patel (Can)
Player of the match: Jatinder Singh (Surrey Jaguars)

- Mississauga Panthers won the toss and elected to field.

Match 14
29 July 2023
11:00
Scorecard

| Toronto Nationals | v | Montreal Tigers |

Match abandoned
TD Cricket Arena, Brampton

- No toss.
- No play was possible due to rain.

Match 15
29 July 2023
15:30 (D/N)
Scorecard

| Vancouver Knights | v | Surrey Jaguars |

Match abandoned
TD Cricket Arena, Brampton

- No toss.
- No play was possible due to wet outfield.

Match 16
30 July 2023
11:00
Scorecard

| Brampton Wolves | v | Mississauga Panthers |

Match abandoned
TD Cricket Arena, Brampton

- No toss.
- No play was possible due to wet outfield.

Match 17
30 July 2023
15:30 (D/N)
Scorecard

| Montreal Tigers; 77/2 (6 overs) | v | Toronto Nationals; 54/2 (6 overs) |
| Chris Lynn 38* (18); Faheem Ashraf 1/13 (1 over) | | JJ Smit 16 (9) |

Montreal Tigers won by 23 runs
TD Cricket Arena, Brampton
Umpires: Arnold Maddela (Can) and Masudur Rahman (Ban)
Player of the match: Chris Lynn (Montreal Tigers)

- Toronto Nationals won the toss and elected to field.
- The match was reduced to 6 overs per side due to rain.

Match 18
1 August 2023
11:00
Scorecard

| Brampton Wolves; 128/9 (20 overs) | v | Surrey Jaguars; 132/4 (18.1 overs) |
| Colin de Grandhomme 34 (34); Ammar Khalid 2/17 (4 overs) | | Litton Das 59 (45); Chris Green 1/22 (4 overs) |

Surrey Jaguars won by 6 wickets
TD Cricket Arena, Brampton
Umpires: Bongani Jele (SA) and Leslie Reifer (WI)
Player of the match: Litton Das (Surrey Jaguars)

- Surrey Jaguars won the toss and elected to field.

Match 19
1 August 2023
15:30 (D/N)
Scorecard

| Montreal Tigers; 99 (18.3 overs) | v | Vancouver Knights; 103/1 (14.5 overs) |
| Muhammad Waseem 28 (24); Ruben Trumpelmann 3/8 (4 overs) | | Mohammad Rizwan 68* (54); Andre Russell 1/20 (3 overs) |

Vancouver Knights won by 9 wickets
TD Cricket Arena, Brampton
Umpires: Masudur Rahman (Ban) and Leslie Reifer (WI)
Player of the match: Ruben Trumpelmann (Vancouver Knights)

- Montreal Tigers won the toss and elected to bat.

Match 20
2 August 2023
11:00
Scorecard

| Mississauga Panthers; 56 (14.3 overs) | v | Surrey Jaguars; 59/2 (9 overs) |
| Shreyas Movva 17 (14); Sandeep Lamichhane 3/6 (4 overs) | | Mohammad Haris 37* (28); Usman Qadir 1/21 (4 overs) |

Surrey Jaguars won by 8 wickets
TD Cricket Arena, Brampton
Umpires: Masudur Rahman (Ban) and Carl Tuckett (WI)
Player of the match: Sandeep Lamichhane (Surrey Jaguars)

- Surrey Jaguars won the toss and elected to field.

Match 21
2 August 2023
15:30 (D/N)
Scorecard

| Vancouver Knights; 128/7 (20 overs) | v | Toronto Nationals; 103 (15.5 overs) |
| Corbin Bosch 30 (26); Sikandar Raza 2/15 (3 overs) | | Darren Bravo 28 (26); Harsh Thaker 4/29 (4 overs) |

Vancouver Knights won by 25 runs
TD Cricket Arena, Brampton
Umpires: Arnold Maddela (Can) and Masudur Rahman (Ban)
Player of the match: Harsh Thaker (Vancouver Knights)

- Toronto Nationals won the toss and elected to field.

== Play-offs ==
Qualifier 1 / Eliminator
4 August 2023 – CAA Centre, Brampton, 11:00
1 | Surrey Jaguars | 139/9 (20 overs)
2 | Vancouver Knights | 101 (16.4 overs)
4 August 2023 – CAA Centre, Brampton, 15:30
3 | Montreal Tigers | 108/1 (14.2 overs)
4 | Brampton Wolves | 104 (20 overs)

Qualifier 2
5 August 2023 – CAA Centre, Brampton, 12:00
Q1L | Vancouver Knights | 137/6 (20 overs)
EW | Montreal Tigers | 141/9 (19.3 overs)

Final
6 August 2023 -CAA Centre, Brampton, 12:00
Q1W | Surrey Jaguars | 130/5 (20 overs)
Q2W | Montreal Tigers | 135/5 (20 overs)

Qualifier 1
4 August 2023
11:00
Scorecard

| Surrey Jaguars; 139/9 (20 overs) | v | Vancouver Knights; 101 (16.4 overs) |
| Iftikhar Ahmed 36 (28); Junaid Siddique 4/22 (4 overs) | | Fabian Allen 27 (20); Matthew Forde 4/16 (2.4 overs) |

Surrey Jaguars won by 38 runs
TD Cricket Arena, Brampton
Umpires: Arnold Maddela (Can) and Masudur Rahman (Ban)
Player of the match: Matthew Forde (Surrey Jaguars)

- Vancouver Knights won the toss and elected to field.

Eliminator
4 August 2023
15:30 (D/N)
Scorecard

| Brampton Wolves; 104 (20 overs) | v | Montreal Tigers; 108/1 (14.2 overs) |
| Aaron Johnson 31 (25); Aayan Afzal Khan 2/16 (4 overs) | | Chris Lynn 63* (47); Shahid Ahmadzai 1/26 (4 overs) |

Montreal Tigers won by 9 wickets
TD Cricket Arena, Brampton
Umpires: Bongani Jele (SA) and Leslie Reifer (WI)
Player of the match: Chris Lynn (Montreal Tigers)

- Montreal Tigers won the toss and elected to field.

Qualifier 2
5 August 2023
12:00
Scorecard

| Vancouver Knights; 137/6 (20 overs) | v | Montreal Tigers; 141/9 (19.3 overs) |
| Mohammad Rizwan 39 (33); Abbas Afridi 5/29 (4 overs) | | Sherfane Rutherford 48* (34); Junaid Siddique 4/22 (4 overs) |

Montreal Tigers won by 1 wicket
TD Cricket Arena, Brampton
Umpires: Rohan Shah (Can) and Masudur Rahman (Ban)
Player of the match: Abbas Afridi (Montreal Tigers)

- Montreal Tigers won the toss and elected to field.
- Abbas Afridi took a hat-trick.

Final
6 August 2023
12:00
Scorecard

| Surrey Jaguars; 130/5 (20 overs) | v | Montreal Tigers; 135/5 (20 overs) |
| Jatinder Singh 56* (57); Aayan Afzal Khan 2/21 (4 overs) | | Sherfane Rutherford 38* (29); Iftikhar Ahmed 2/8 (4 overs) |

Montreal Tigers won by 5 wickets
TD Cricket Arena, Brampton
Umpires: Rohan Shah (Can) and Carl Tuckett (WI)
Player of the match: Sherfane Rutherford (Montreal Tigers)

- Montreal Tigers won the toss and elected to field.

== Statistics ==
- Although matches are being played using standard Twenty20 formats, players' statistics aren't included in their official records because Cricket Canada is not a full-member of the International Cricket Council

=== Most runs ===
| Player | Team | Innings | Runs | High score |
|---|---|---|---|---|
| Chris Lynn | Montreal Tigers | 9 | 234 | 64 |
| Sherfane Rutherford | Montreal Tigers | 9 | 220 | 84 |
| Colin Munro | Toronto Nationals | 4 | 212 | 78 |
| Mohammad Rizwan | Vancouver Knights | 5 | 190 | 68 |
| Jatinder Singh | Surrey Jaguars | 8 | 183 | 57 |
| Iftikhar Ahmed | Surrey Jaguars | 8 | 183 | 47 |

- Source ESPNcricinfo

=== Most wickets ===
| Player | Team | Matches | Wickets | Best bowling |
|---|---|---|---|---|
| Matthew Forde | Surrey Jaguars | 8 | 15 | 4/16 |
| Junaid Siddique | Vancouver Knights | 8 | 15 | 4/22 |
| Ruben Trumpelmann | Vancouver Knights | 8 | 13 | 4/25 |
| Logan Van Beek | Brampton Wolves | 7 | 12 | 4/12 |
| Sandeep Lamichhane | Surrey Jaguars | 8 | 11 | 3/6 |
| Corbin Bosch | Vancouver Knights | 8 | 11 | 3/11 |
| Carlos Brathwaite | Montreal Tigers | 9 | 11 | 4/21 |

- Source: ESPNcricinfo

== Broadcasting ==
The competition is being broadcast on the following television and streaming services around the globe:

| Location | Television broadcaster(s) | Streaming |
|---|---|---|
| Australia | Cable/satellite (pay): Fox Sports | foxsports.com.au cricket.com.au |
| Canada | CBC Television | CBC Gem |
| United Kingdom | Cable/satellite (pay): Free Sports | |
| Bangladesh | Cable/satellite (pay): T Sports | T Sports app |
| India Nepal | Cable/satellite (pay): Star Sports | Fancode |
| Middle East | Bein Sports | |
| Pakistan | A Sports | Ary Zap |
| South Africa | SuperSport | |
| United States | | MAQ TV |
| Other regions | Kwesé Sports | DAZN |
