= 2025 Men's T20 World Cup Americas Regional Final =

Qualifying tournament for the 2026 T20WC

2025 ICC Men's T20 World Cup Americas Regional Final
- Dates: 15 – 22 June 2025
- Administrator: ICC Americas
- Cricket format: Twenty20 International
- Tournament format: Double round-robin
- Host: Canada
- Champions: Canada
- Runners-up: Bermuda
- Participants: 4
- Matches: 12
- Player of the series: (Cayman Islands) Jermaine Baker
- Most runs: (Cayman Islands) Jermaine Baker (311)
- Most wickets: (Canada) Shivam Sharma (11)

The 2025 ICC Men's T20 World Cup Americas Regional Final was a cricket tournament that formed part of the qualification process for the 2026 Men's T20 World Cup. It was held from 15 to 22 June 2025.

The winner of the tournament would qualify for the 2026 T20 World Cup, where they would join United States and West Indies from the Americas region, who had automatically qualified.

Canada won the qualifier to secure a place at the 2026 T20 World Cup.

== Teams and qualification ==
The top three sides from the Sub-regional Qualifier advanced to the regional final, where they will be joined by Canada who were given a bye after having participated in the previous T20 World Cup.

Method of qualification	Date	Venue(s)	No. of teams	Team
2024 ICC Men's T20 World Cup	29 June 2024	United States; West Indies	1	Canada
Sub-regional Qualifier	6 – 16 December 2024	Argentina	3	Bahamas
Sub-regional Qualifier	6 – 16 December 2024	Argentina	3	Bermuda
Sub-regional Qualifier	6 – 16 December 2024	Argentina	3	Cayman Islands
Total			4	

== Squads ==
Bahamas	Bermuda	Canada	Cayman Islands
Marc Taylor (c); Jonathan Barry; Festus Benn; Keith Burrows; Eugene Duff; Shawn Fowler; Javelle Gallimore; Sandeep Goud; Akash Gulati; Antonio Harris; Everette Haven; Kervon Hinds; Julio Jemison (wk); Ashok Nair; Gregory Taylor; Dwight Weakley; Dwight Wheatley	Terryn Fray (c, wk); Sinclair Smith (vc, wk); Onias Bascome; Derrick Brangman; Zeko Burgess; Alex Dore; Kevon Fubler; Tre Manders; Jermal Proctor; Delray Rawlins; Jarryd Richardson (wk); Dominic Sabir; Marcus Scotland (wk); Chare Smith; Jonté Smith	Nicholas Kirton (c); Kaleem Sana (vc); Dilpreet Bajwa; Saad Bin Zafar; Dilon Heyliger; Aaron Johnson; Ali Nadeem (wk); Ansh Patel; Mihir Patel; Yuvraj Samra; Shivam Sharma; Jaskaran Singh; Pargat Singh; Ravinderpal Singh; Kanwarpal Tathgur (wk); Harsh Thaker	Conroy Wright (c); Ramon Sealy (vc); Jermaine Baker (wk); Kevon Bazil; Brian Corbin; Anubhav Dhar; Romeo Dunka; Ronald Ebanks; Sam Foster; Alessandro Morris; Akshay Naidoo; Sunil; Troy Taylor; Rickel Walker; Adrian Wright

== No Frills T20I series ==
The No Frills T20I series consisted of five T20I matches played ahead of the qualifier.

11 June 2025
10:30
Scorecard

Bahamas; 89/4 (20 overs)	v	Cayman Islands; 90/5 (12.3 overs)
Dwight Wheatley 32* (23); Adrian Wright 2/17 (4 overs)		Romeo Dunka 30* (20); Dwight Weakley 2/28 (4 overs)

Cayman Islands won by 5 wickets
Maple Leaf North-East Ground, King City
Umpires: Amol Bhatt (Can) and Rohan Shah (Can)
Player of the match: Adrian Wright (Cay)

- Cayman Islands won the toss and elected to field.
- Shawn Fowler, Akash Gulati (Bah) and Anubhav Dhar (Cay) all made their T20I debuts.
- This was the first T20I to be played at the venue.

12 June 2025
10:30
Scorecard

Canada; 219 (19.5 overs)	v	Bahamas; 112/7 (20 overs)
Dilpreet Bajwa 50 (33); Keith Burrows 3/22 (2 overs)		Marc Taylor 61 (50); Yuvraj Samra 2/13 (2 overs)

Canada won by 107 runs
Maple Leaf North-East Ground, King City
Umpires: Arnold Maddela (Can) and Bijal Patel (Can)
Player of the match: Marc Taylor (Bah)

- Canada won the toss and elected to bat.

12 June 2025
15:30
Scorecard

Bermuda; 172/7 (20 overs)	v	Cayman Islands; 142 (19.1 overs)
Dominic Sabir 46 (27); Troy Taylor 4/43 (4 overs)		Jermaine Baker 51 (29); Dominic Sabir 4/21 (4 overs)

Bermuda won by 30 runs
Maple Leaf North-East Ground, King City
Umpires: Bijal Patel (Can) and Rohan Shah (Can)
Player of the match: Dominic Sabir (Ber)

- Bermuda won the toss and elected to bat.

13 June 2025
10:30
Scorecard

Bermuda; 163/6 (20 overs)	v	Bahamas; 145/5 (20 overs)
Delray Rawlins 77 (57); Kervon Hinds 2/11 (4 overs)		Marc Taylor 71* (59); Delray Rawlins 2/26 (4 overs)

Bermuda won by 18 runs
Maple Leaf North-East Ground, King City
Umpires: Amol Bhatt (Can) and Arnold Maddela (Can)
Player of the match: Delray Rawlins (Ber)

- Bermuda won the toss and elected to bat.

13 June 2025
15:30
Scorecard

Canada; 236/6 (20 overs)	v	Cayman Islands; 110/6 (20 overs)
Pargat Singh 89* (44); Jermaine Baker 3/33 (3 overs)		Sam Foster 32 (32); Nicholas Kirton 1/3 (1 over); Pargat Singh 1/3 (1 over)

Canada won by 126 runs
Maple Leaf North-East Ground, King City
Umpires: Amol Bhatt (Can) and Rohan Shah (Can)
Player of the match: Pargat Singh (Can)

- Canada won the toss and elected to bat.
- Mihir Patel (Can) and Sunil (Cay) both made their T20I debuts.

== Points table ==
Final standings
Pos	Team	Pld	W	L	NR	Pts	NRR	Qualification
1	Canada (H)	6	6	0	0	12	4.843	Qualified for the 2026 Men's T20 World Cup
2	Bermuda	6	3	3	0	6	0.186	Eliminated
3	Cayman Islands	6	3	3	0	6	−0.705	Eliminated
4	Bahamas	6	0	6	0	0	−4.234	Eliminated

Source: ESPNcricinfo
(H) Host

== Fixtures ==
15 June 2025
10:30
Scorecard

Canada; 205/5 (20 overs)	v	Bermuda; 95 (19.1 overs)
Yuvraj Samra 63 (35); Derrick Brangman 2/47 (4 overs)		Derrick Brangman 32* (35); Kaleem Sana 3/16 (4 overs)

Canada won by 110 runs
Maple Leaf North-West Ground, King City
Umpires: Gregory Brathwaite (WI) and Deighton Butler (WI)
Player of the match: Harsh Thaker (Can)

- Bermuda won the toss and elected to field.

15 June 2025
15:30
Scorecard

Cayman Islands; 183/7 (20 overs)	v	Bahamas; 145/7 (20 overs)
Jermaine Baker 66 (45); Kervon Hinds 3/14 (4 overs)		Kervon Hinds 60 (47); Troy Taylor 3/34 (4 overs)

Cayman Islands won by 38 runs
Maple Leaf North-West Ground, King City
Umpires: Zahid Bassarath (WI) and Arnold Maddela (Can)
Player of the match: Jermaine Baker (Cay)

- Bahamas won the toss and elected to field.

16 June 2025
10:30
Scorecard

Canada; 162/5 (20 overs)	v	Cayman Islands; 103/9 (20 overs)
Kanwarpal Tathgur 53* (32); Romeo Dunka 2/30 (4 overs)		Jermaine Baker 30 (23); Shivam Sharma 3/12 (4 overs)

Canada won by 59 runs
Maple Leaf North-West Ground, King City
Umpires: Zahid Bassarath (WI) and Gregory Brathwaite (WI)
Player of the match: Kanwarpal Tathgur (Can)

- Cayman Islands won the toss and elected to field.

16 June 2025
15:30
Scorecard

Bahamas; 90/8 (20 overs)	v	Bermuda; 91/3 (9.5 overs)
Eugene Duff 31 (33); Chare Smith 2/11 (4 overs)		Onias Bascome 43 (20); Festus Benn 1/7 (1.5 overs)

Bermuda won by 7 wickets
Maple Leaf North-West Ground, King City
Umpires: Deighton Butler (WI) and Arnold Maddela (Can)
Player of the match: Onias Bascome (Ber)

- Bahamas won the toss and elected to bat.

18 June 2025
10:30
Scorecard

Cayman Islands; 121/9 (20 overs)	v	Bermuda; 126/3 (12.5 overs)
Jermaine Baker 51 (42); Jonté Smith 3/19 (4 overs)		Delray Rawlins 42* (21); Alessandro Morris 2/20 (4 overs)

Bermuda won by 7 wickets
Maple Leaf North-West Ground, King City
Umpires: Gregory Brathwaite (WI) and Arnold Maddela (Can)
Player of the match: Jonté Smith (Ber)

- Bermuda won the toss and elected to field.

18 June 2025
15:30
Scorecard

Bahamas; 52/7 (11 overs)	v	Canada; 54/0 (4.3 overs)
Kervon Hinds 12 (7); Shivam Sharma 2/6 (2 overs)		Yuvraj Samra 50* (15)

Canada won by 10 wickets (DLS method)
Maple Leaf North-West Ground, King City
Umpires: Zahid Bassarath (WI) and Deighton Butler (WI)
Player of the match: Yuvraj Samra (Can)

- Canada won the toss and elected to field.
- Canada were set a revised target of 53 runs in 11 overs due to rain.

19 June 2025
10:30
Scorecard

Bermuda; 114/6 (9 overs)	v	Bahamas; 88/2 (9 overs)
Delray Rawlins 68* (32); Marc Taylor 2/19 (2 overs)		Gregory Taylor 56* (30); Derrick Brangman 1/23 (2 overs)

Bermuda won by 26 runs
Maple Leaf North-West Ground, King City
Umpires: Deighton Butler (WI) and Arnold Maddela (Can)
Player of the match: Delray Rawlins (Ber)

- Bahamas won the toss and elected to field.
- The match was reduced to 9 overs per side due to rain.

19 June 2025
14:30
Scorecard

Canada; 81/0 (5 overs)	v	Cayman Islands; 39/5 (5 overs)
Dilpreet Bajwa 55* (21)		Jermaine Baker 15 (8); Shivam Sharma 2/5 (1 over)

Canada won by 42 runs
Maple Leaf North-West Ground, King City
Umpires: Zahid Bassarath (WI) and Gregory Brathwaite (WI)
Player of the match: Dilpreet Bajwa (Can)

- Cayman Islands won the toss and elected to field.
- The match was reduced to 5 overs per side due to rain.

21 June 2025
10:30
Scorecard

Bahamas; 57 (19.5 overs)	v	Canada; 61/3 (5.3 overs)
Javelle Gallimore 14* (19); Kaleem Sana 3/6 (4 overs)		Dilpreet Bajwa 36* (14); Kervon Hinds 2/33 (3 overs)

Canada won by 7 wickets
Maple Leaf North-West Ground, King City
Umpires: Gregory Brathwaite (WI) and Deighton Butler (WI)
Player of the match: Kaleem Sana (Can)

- Canada won the toss and elected to field.

21 June 2025
15:30
Scorecard

Bermuda; 139/2 (14 overs)	v	Cayman Islands; 142/1 (13.1 overs)
Tre Manders 69* (46); Adrian Wright 1/19 (2 overs)		Jermaine Baker 55* (35); Dominic Sabir 1/15 (3 overs)

Cayman Islands won by 9 wickets
Maple Leaf North-West Ground, King City
Umpires: Zahid Bassarath (WI) and Arnold Maddela (Can)
Player of the match: Ramon Sealy (Cay)

- Cayman Islands won the toss and elected to field.
- The match was reduced to 14 overs per side due to rain.

22 June 2025
10:30
Scorecard

Cayman Islands; 167/5 (20 overs)	v	Bahamas; 118/7 (20 overs)
Jermaine Baker 94 (60); Kervon Hinds 2/14 (4 overs)		Festus Benn 39* (32); Romeo Dunka 3/23 (4 overs)

Cayman Islands won by 49 runs
Maple Leaf North-West Ground, King City
Umpires: Arnold Maddela (Can) and Rohan Shah (Can)
Player of the match: Jermaine Baker (Cay)

- Bahamas won the toss and elected to field.

22 June 2025
15:30
Scorecard

Bermuda; 131 (18.3 overs)	v	Canada; 132/4 (15.5 overs)
Delray Rawlins 70 (42); Saad Bin Zafar 3/10 (4 overs)		Yuvraj Samra 45 (23); Dominic Sabir 2/28 (4 overs)

Canada won by 6 wickets
Maple Leaf North-West Ground, King City
Umpires: Zahid Bassarath (WI) and Deighton Butler (WI)
Player of the match: Saad Bin Zafar (Can)

- Bermuda won the toss and elected to bat.
