= Bahamian cricket team in the Cayman Islands in 2021–22 =

International cricket tour

	Cayman Islands	Bahamas
- Dates: 13 – 17 April 2022
Captains	Ramon Sealy	Marc Taylor

Twenty20 International series
- Results: Cayman Islands won the 5-match series 5–0
Most runs	Ramon Sealy (181)	Marc Taylor (132)
Most wickets	Kevon Bazil (8)	Marc Taylor (5)

The Bahamas cricket team toured the Cayman Islands in April 2022 to play a five-match Twenty20 International (T20I) matches against the Cayman Islands. The series was played in George Town, with the first two matches at the Jimmy Powell Oval and the remaining three matches at the Smith Road Oval. The Cayman Islands won all of the matches to take the series 5–0.

== Squads ==
Cayman Islands	Bahamas
Ramon Sealy (c, wk); Kevon Bazil; Paul Chin (wk); Luke Harrington-Myers; Patrick Heron; Alistair Ifill; Demar Johnson; Jalon Linton; Alessandro Morris; Gregory Smith; Marvin Swack; Troy Taylor; Omar Willis (wk); Conroy Wright	Marc Taylor (c); Festus Benn; Keith Burrows; Renford Davson; Derrick Edgecombe; Rudolph Fox; Sandeep Goud; Antonio Harris; Everette Haven; Bhumeshwar Jagroo; Jagnauth Jagroo; Julio Jemison (wk); Gregory Taylor (wk); Dwight Wheatley

== T20I series ==
=== 1st T20I ===
13 April 2022
14:00
Scorecard

Bahamas; 85/6 (20 overs)	v	Cayman Islands; 88/2 (11.2 overs)
Rudolph Fox 24* (21); Marvin Swack 2/12 (4 overs)		Patrick Heron 56* (38); Bhumeshwar Jagroo 1/8 (1 over)

Cayman Islands won by 8 wickets
Jimmy Powell Oval, George Town
Umpires: Livingstone Bailey (Cay) and Leon Watson (Cay)
Player of the match: Patrick Heron (Cay)

- Cayman Islands won the toss and elected to field.
- Kavon Bazil, Paul Chin, Patrick Heron, Jalon Linton, Ramon Sealy, Marvin Swack (Cay), Festus Benn, Rudolph Fox, Julio Jemison and Dwight Wheatley (Bah) all made their T20I debuts.

=== 2nd T20I ===
14 April 2022
14:00
Scorecard

Cayman Islands; 148/6 (20 overs)	v	Bahamas; 133/9 (20 overs)
Ramon Sealy 43 (24); Bhumeshwar Jagroo 2/34 (4 overs)		Jagnauth Jagroo 34 (38); Alessandro Morris 4/26 (4 overs)

Cayman Islands won by 15 runs
Jimmy Powell Oval, George Town
Umpires: Livingstone Bailey (Cay) and Derrick Williams (Cay)
Player of the match: Alessandro Morris (Cay)

- Bahamas won the toss and elected to field.

=== 3rd T20I ===
16 April 2022
10:00
Scorecard

Bahamas; 113/4 (17 overs)	v	Cayman Islands; 119/3 (13.2 overs)
Marc Taylor 67 (49); Kevon Bazil 2/9 (4 overs)		Ramon Sealy 73* (32); Jagnauth Jagroo 1/25 (3 overs)

Cayman Islands won by 7 wickets
Smith Road Oval, George Town
Umpires: Ezra Hewitt (Cay) and Courtney Young (Cay)
Player of the match: Ramon Sealy (Cay)

- Cayman Islands won the toss and elected to field.
- The match was reduced to 17 overs per side due to rain.
- Demar Johnson and Gregory Smith (Cay) both made their T20I debuts.

=== 4th T20I ===
16 April 2022
15:00
Scorecard

Cayman Islands; 166/4 (20 overs)	v	Bahamas; 101 (17.1 overs)
Conroy Wright 50 (30); Gregory Taylor 2/27 (4 overs)		Sandeep Goud 25 (21); Alistair Ifill 2/12 (3.1 overs)

Cayman Islands won by 65 runs
Smith Road Oval, George Town
Umpires: Ezra Hewitt (Cay) and Courtney Young (Cay)
Player of the match: Ramon Sealy (Cay)

- Cayman Islands won the toss and elected to bat.
- Keith Burrows (Bah) made his T20I debut.

=== 5th T20I ===
17 April 2022
14:00
Scorecard

Cayman Islands; 180/6 (20 overs)	v	Bahamas; 138/7 (20 overs)
Patrick Heron 59 (40); Marc Taylor 3/35 (4 overs)		Marc Taylor 42 (37); Alistair Ifill 2/18 (4 overs)

Cayman Islands won by 42 runs
Smith Road Oval, George Town
Umpires: Ezra Hewitt (Cay) and Derrick Williams (Cay)
Player of the match: Patrick Heron (Cay)

- Bahamas won the toss and elected to field.
