= Abzal =

Abzal is a given name. Notable people with the name include:

- Abzal Azhgaliyev (born 1992), Kazakh speed skater
- Abzal Beysebekov (born 1992), Kazakh footballer
- Abzal Dean (born 1983), Canadian cricketer
- Abzal Rakimgaliev (born 1992), Kazakh figure skater
- Abzal Zhumabaev (born 1986), Kazakh footballer
