= Gregory Smith (cricketer) =

South African cricketer (born 1986)

Personal information
- Full name: Gregory Smith
- Born: 3 July 1986 (age 40)

International information
- National side: Cayman Islands
- T20I debut (cap 23): 16 April 2022 v Bahamas
- Last T20I: 16 April 2022 v Bahamas
- Source: Cricinfo, 17 April 2022

Gregory Smith (born 3 July 1986) is a Caymanian cricketer. He played in two matches for the Cayman Islands cricket team in the 2017 ICC World Cricket League Division Five tournament in South Africa.

In August 2019, he was named in the Cayman Islands cricket team's Twenty20 International (T20I) squad for the Regional Finals of the 2018–19 ICC T20 World Cup Americas Qualifier tournament. In April 2022, he was named in the Cayman Islands' T20I squad for their series against the Bahamas. He made his T20I debut on 16 April 2022, for the Cayman Islands against the Bahamas.
