= Marlon Graham =

Barbadian cricketer and coach (born 1978)

Personal information
- Born: 27 September 1978 (age 48); Barbados
- Batting: Right-handed
- Bowling: Right-arm medium

International information
- National side: Bahamas
- T20I debut (cap 3): 7 November 2021 v Canada
- Last T20I: 13 November 2021 v Panama

Domestic team information
- Years: Team
- 2010/11: Barbados

Career statistics
Competition	T20I	LA	T20
Matches	6	2	6
Runs scored	20	–	20
Batting average	4.00	–	4.00
100s/50s	–/–	–/–	–/–
Top score	8	–	8
Balls bowled	102	120	102
Wickets	2	2	2
Bowling average	59.00	47.00	59.00
5 wickets in innings	–	–	–
10 wickets in match	–	–	–
Best bowling	1/16	1/25	1/16
Catches/stumpings	1/–	–/–	1/–
- Source: Cricinfo, 29 November 2022

Marlon Graham (born 27 September 1978) is a Barbadian cricketer and coach. He played in two List A matches for the Barbados cricket team in 2010. In October 2021, Graham was named in the Bahamas Twenty20 International (T20I) squad for the 2021 ICC Men's T20 World Cup Americas Qualifier tournament in Antigua. He made his T20I debut on 7 November 2021, for the Bahamas against Canada.

== See also ==
- List of Barbadian representative cricketers
