= Saad Bin Zafar =

Canadian cricketer (born 1986)

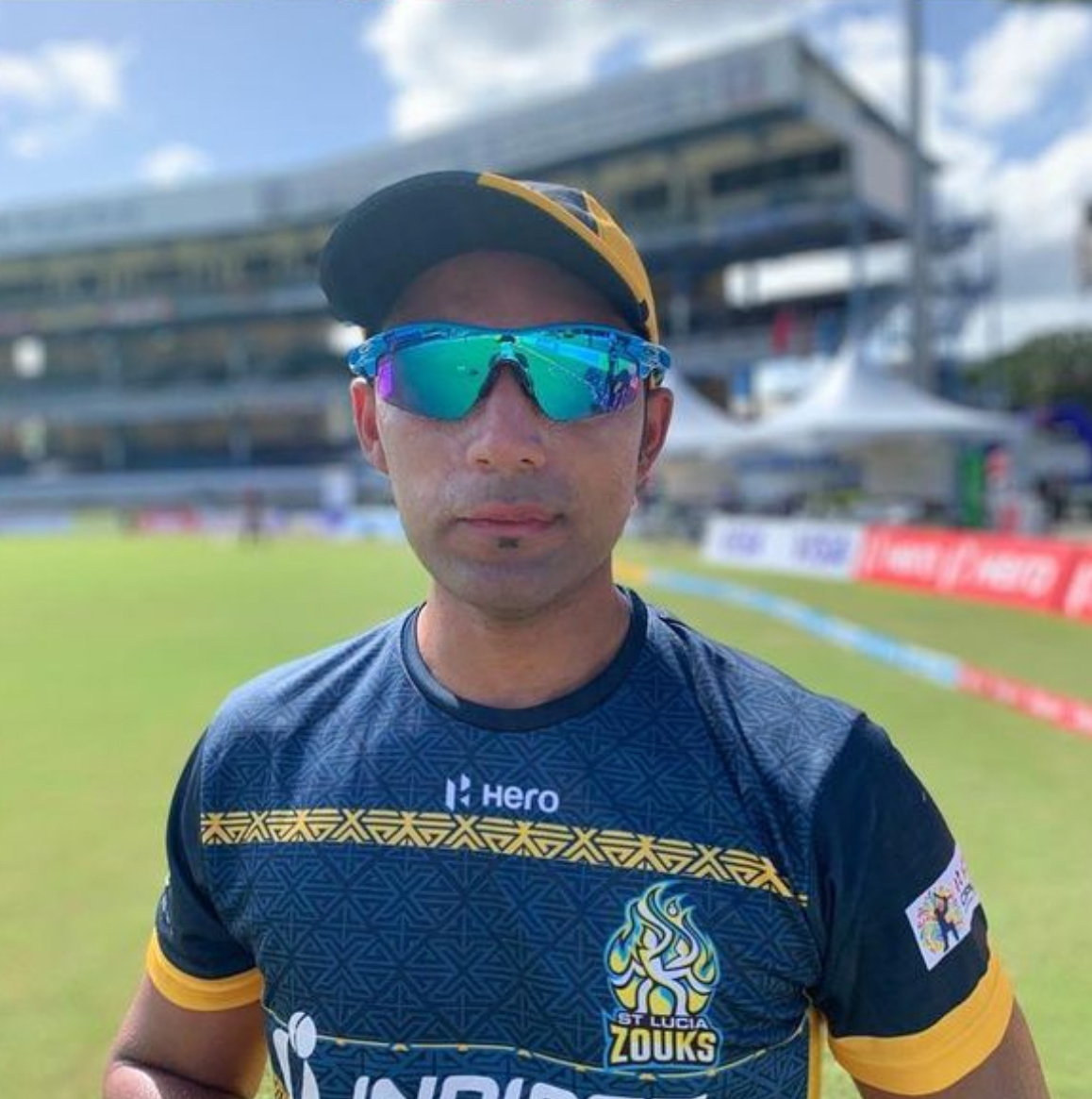
- Saad Bin Zafar in 2020

Personal information
- Born: 10 November 1986 (age 40); Gujranwala, Punjab, Pakistan
- Batting: Left-handed
- Bowling: Slow left arm orthodox
- Role: All-rounder

International information
- National side: Canada (2008-present)
- ODI debut (cap 91): 27 March 2023 v Jersey
- Last ODI: 13 August 2026 v Scotland
- T20I debut (cap 47): 18 August 2019 v Cayman Islands
- Last T20I: 19 February 2026 v Afghanistan

Domestic team information
- Years: Team
- 2015–2017: ICC Americas
- 2018–2019: Vancouver Knights
- 2018: St Kitts and Nevis Patriots
- 2019: Amsterdam Knights
- 2019: Falcon Hunters
- 2020: Saint Lucia Kings
- 2020: Houston Hurricanes
- 2022: Muzaffarabad Tigers
- 2023-2024: Toronto Nationals
- 2024: Lumbini Lions
- 2026-present: Misssissauga Masters
- 2026-present: Toronto Kings

Career statistics
Competition	ODI	T20I	LA	T20
Matches	37	69	72	77
Runs scored	460	507	855	537
Batting average	17.03	25.35	19.00	22.37
100s/50s	0/0	0/0	0/0	0/0
Top score	40*	33*	43	33*
Balls bowled	1,869	1,398	3,475	1,544
Wickets	34	76	90	78
Bowling average	39.79	18.84	25.73	19.79
5 wickets in innings	0	0	2	0
10 wickets in match	0	0	0	0
Best bowling	3/30	3/8	5/18	3/8
Catches/stumpings	10/–	24/-	24/-	24/-
- Source: ESPNcricinfo, 30 April 2023

Saad Bin Zafar (Urdu: سعد بن ظفر; born 10 November 1986) is a Pakistani-Canadian cricketer who represents Canada in international cricket and is the current captain of the Canadian national cricket team. Saad is a left-handed all-rounder.

As a bowler, Saad holds the world record for completing his maximum quota of overs (4 overs in a 20-over match) without conceding a run in a men's T20I match and has the 7th most maiden overs bowled in T20I career.

As a batsman, Saad also currently holds the record for the 3rd highest strike rate of 414.28 in a T20I innings.

== Early career ==
At the age of 10, he started playing tape ball cricket with friends on the streets. Later at the age of 14, his school's sports teacher spotted Saad and introduced him to Leather ball cricket by selecting him for the junior school cricket team. In 2004, he started playing club cricket for Overseas Cricket club in Premier Division.

In 2005, Saad was selected in Canada's U19 squad for the 2005 ICC Americas Under-19 Championship. However, he was subsequently withdrawn from the squad after it was determined that he did not meet the International Cricket Council's (ICC) four-year residency requirement. While enrolled at the Scarborough campus at the University of Toronto he got the opportunity to lead CIMA Toronto Mayor's Team XI which toured to England under the program of Cricket Across the Pond in 2010. He had an impressive all-round performance by scoring 275 runs and bagged 11 wickets. He also had a successful stint as a skipper of Mayor's Team XI by winning 7 out of their 9 matches on the tour. He scored 262 not out in a 50 over game in Scarborough Cricket League Premier Division in August 2015.

== Domestic and T20 franchise career ==
In January 2017, he played for the ICC Americas in the 2016–17 Regional Super50 and was the leading wicket-taker for his team. In his 9 wickets that season, he was able to dismiss the likes of Shai Hope, Jermaine Blackwood, and Chadwick Walton.

On 3 June 2018, he was selected to play for the Vancouver Knights in the players' draft for the inaugural edition of the Global T20 Canada tournament. Saad was the second Canadian player to be selected in the draft after Nikhil Dutta in round 9. In his third match against Montreal Tigers his bowling figure was 3/21 in 4 overs. In his fifth match against Toronto Nationals he took 2/22 in 3.5 overs and scored unbeaten 12 in 47-run winning partnership with Chadwick Walton.

In the final match of 2018 Global T20 Canada against West Indies B cricket team, he took wickets of Fabian Allen and Brandon King by giving away 26 runs in 4 overs, also having a wicket maiden over. Vancouver Knights didn't have an ideal start to the chase as Chadwick Walton, Chris Gayle and Ben Dunk fell cheaply to leave them at 22 for 3 but Saad and Rassie van der Dussen came up with a crucial unbeaten 126-run partnership to get Knights back on track in the chase. Saad played the role of an aggressor, dealing in regular boundaries to bring up a 32-ball fifty. He collected eight fours and three sixes in his unbeaten 48-ball stay for 79 runs. Saad was adjudged man of the match for his brilliant all-round performance.

In September 2018, he was called up as a replacement player of Bangladesh's allrounder Mahmudullah by St Kitts and Nevis Patriots for CPL playoffs .

In June 2019, he was selected to play for the Vancouver Knights franchise team in the 2019 Global T20 Canada tournament. He had a successful tournament by being the leading wicket-taker for the Vancouver Knights.

In the Qualifier 1 against Brampton Wolves, Saad was able to pick up 4 wickets by only giving 22 runs in 4 overs. He bowled exceptionally well in the 8th over in which he bagged 3 wickets by only giving 1 run which included the wicket of Shahid Afridi on a golden duck and the captain Colin Munro, who scored the fastest 50 of the tournament. His outstanding bowling spell got him the well-deserved man of the match award and led the Vancouver Knights into finals. In the final match against Winnipeg Hawks, he had an 86-run 5th wicket partnership with Shoaib Malik and 53-run 6th wicket partnership with Andre Russell. Due to the high run rate requirement, Vancouver couldn't find success chasing the 192 target set by the Hawks and loss in the super over.

In July 2019, he was selected to play for the Amsterdam Knights in the inaugural edition of the Euro T20 Slam cricket tournament. However, the following month the tournament was cancelled.

In December 2019, he was selected to play for the Falcon Hunters in the Qatar T10 League. Falcon Hunters were named Champions for the inaugural season by beating Swift Gallopers by 4 wickets. Saad had a successful tournament just like his team by being the fifth leading wicket-taker of the season.

In July 2020, he was named in the St Lucia Zouks squad for the 2020 Caribbean Premier League.

In September 2020, he was added to the Houston Hurricanes squad for the 2021 Minor League Cricket season. He was later traded to the Michigan Cricket Stars. He was the most economical bowler for Michigan Cricket Stars with 5.7 economy rate and was able to pick up 14 wickets from 12 matches.

In July 2022, he was selected to play for the Muzaffarabad Tigers following the players' draft for the 2022 Kashmir Premier League. Despite Muzaffarabad Tigers ending up at the bottom of the points table, Saad had a successful stint by being the 3rd most economical bowler of the season with the economy rate of 6.26 from 5 matches.

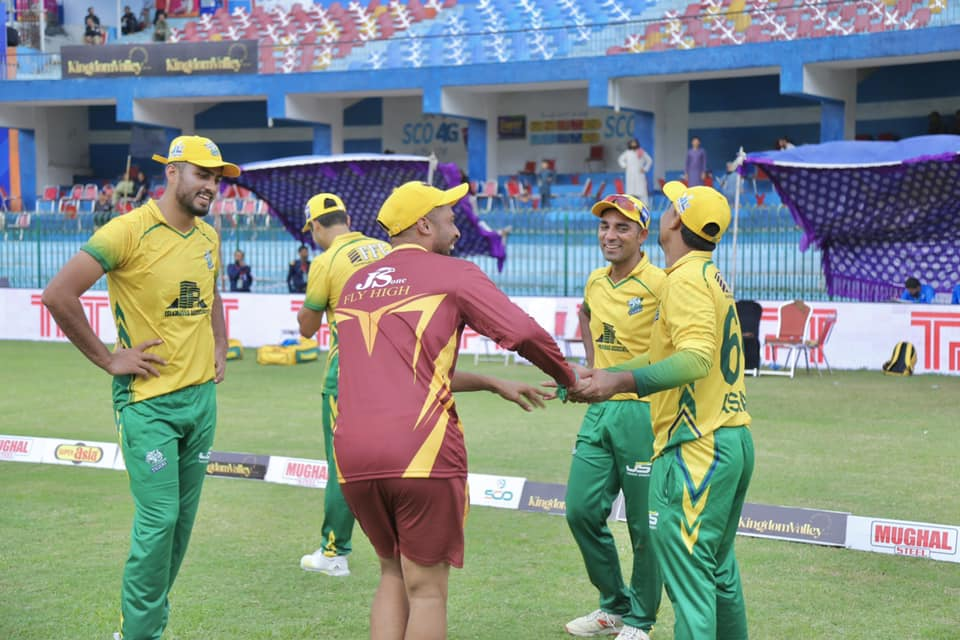
Saad Bin Zafar with his teammates and Mohammad Amir during Kashmir Premier League Season 2

In June 2023, he was the first Canadian player to be drafted for 2023 Global T20 Canada by Toronto Nationals. In his 3rd match against Surrey Jaguars, his bowling figure was 2/14 in 4 overs, including the wickets of Alex Hales and Liton Das. In his 4th match against Mississauga Panthers he bowled exceptionally well with the bowling figure of 3/31 including the wicket of James Neesham. There was some controversy in Toronto national's last match against Vancouver knight Saad had taken the wicket of Mohammad Rizwan as Zaman Khan clearly caught the ball on camera but the third umpire decided to gift Rizwan a life by giving it a not out.

In August 2023, he was appointed the captain of New Jersey Somerset Cavaliers for the 2023 Minor League Cricket season. He ended the season with being the 4th most economical bowler of the tournament with the economy rate of 3.82 from 9 matches.

In June 2024, he was retained to play for the Toronto Nationals franchise team in the 2024 Global T20 Canada tournament. Toronto Nationals were named Champions for Season 4 by beating the defending champions Montreal Tigers by 8 wickets. Just like the Nationals, Saad had a successful season by being the 2nd most economical bowler of the tournament with the economy rate of 4.18 from 6 matches.

In August 2024, he was selected to play for the New Jersey Somerset Cavaliers for the 2024 Minor League Cricket season.

In November 2024, he was signed to play for Lumbini Lions in the inaugural season of Nepal Premier League. Despite Lumbini Lions failing to make it to the playoffs, he consistently performed well with bat, bowl and in field for his team. He was leading wicket-taker for his team with 9 dismissals. He was also leading catch taker for his team with 6 catches. He batted with 2nd best strike rate in his team scoring 83 runs with the strike rate off 131.74. In the 16th match of the tournament, Saad formed the highest 5th-wicket partnership of the tournament by scoring 114 runs together with Rohit Paudel.

In September 2025, He was signed to play for Houston Generals for the 2025 National Cricket League USA season and was the leading wicket-taker for his team with 8 wickets.

In July 2026, He was drafted by Mississauga Masters for the 2026 Canada Super60 season. Saad was the most economical bowler of the tournament with the economy rate of 1.0.

In October 2026, He was signed by Toronto Kings for the 2026 Global T20 Canada season held in Saint Vincent and the Grenadines. In his third match of the tournament against the Montreal Tigers, Zafar scored 25 runs and took 2 wickets for 9 runs, earning the Man of the Match award; the performance also made him the joint all-time leading wicket-taker in GT20 Canada history alongside Sandeep Lamichhane, with 32 wickets. In his fifth match against the Mississauga Skyhawks, he scored 35 runs and picked up 2 wickets to secure his second Man of the Match award of the season while becoming the sole all-time leading wicket-taker in GT20 Canada history.

Zafar enjoyed a successful campaign overall as the Toronto Kings won the 2026 title. He finished the season as the tournament's 4th leading wicket-taker with 10 wickets and its 5th most economical bowler. By the end of his fifth GT20 season, Zafar held the record as the tournament's all time leading wicket-taker with 37 wickets.

== International career ==
=== Early years ===
In June 2008 Saad was named in Canada's Squad for the 2007–08 ICC Intercontinental Cup. He made his International debut on 4 July 2008 playing against Bermuda. He looked impressive in his debut as he took 4 wickets, including the wicket of Bermuda's captain Irving Romaine who was close to scoring a century.

In December 2009, he was named in Canada's squad for the 2010 Quadrangular Twenty20 Series in Sri Lanka. In January 2010, he was named in Canada's squad for the 2010 ICC World Twenty20 Qualifier tournament in the United Arab Emirates. He made his T20 debut against UAE in the 9th match of the tournament.

=== Comeback ===
In April 2015, he made a comeback into international cricket by getting named in Canada's squad for the 2015 ICC Americas Twenty20 Division One. In June 2015, he was named in Canada's squad for the 2015 ICC World Twenty20 Qualifier tournament hosted by Scotland and Ireland. He was the most economical bowler for Canada with 6.23 economy rate from 5 matches.

In May 2017, he was named in Canada's squad for the 2017 ICC World Cricket League Division Three tournament in Uganda. In January 2018, he was named in Canada's squad for the 2018 ICC World Cricket League Division Two tournament in Namibia. In August 2018, he was named in Canada's squad for the 2018–19 ICC World Twenty20 Americas Qualifier tournament in Morrisville, North Carolina.

In April 2019, he was named in Canada's squad for the 2019 ICC World Cricket League Division Two tournament in Namibia. Even though Canada was not able to gain ODI status but he had a successful tournament by being the leading wicket-taker for Canada, with 11 dismissals in 6 matches. In August 2019, he was named in Canada's squad for the Regional Finals of the 2018–19 ICC T20 World Cup Americas Qualifier tournament. He made his Twenty20 International (T20I) debut for Canada against the Cayman Islands on 18 August 2019. In September 2019, he was named in Canada's squad for the 2019 Malaysia Cricket World Cup Challenge League A tournament and was the most economical bowler for Canada with the economy rate of 3.50 from 5 matches.

In October 2019, he was named in Canada's squad for the 2019 ICC T20 World Cup Qualifier tournament in the United Arab Emirates. He was the leading wicket-taker for Canada in the tournament, with 9 dismissals in 5 matches.

In October 2021, he was named in Canada's squad for the 2021 ICC Men's T20 World Cup Americas Qualifier tournament in Antigua. On 14 November 2021, in Canada's match against Panama, Saad became the first bowler to bowl four overs in a T20I match without conceding a run. In February 2022, he was named in Canada's squad for the 2022 ICC Men's T20 World Cup Global Qualifier A tournament in Oman.

In July 2024, he was named in Canada's ODI and T20I squad for the 2024 Netherlands Tri-Nation Series. Saad had a successful tour by being the leading wicket taker for Canada in both ODI and T20I Series by picking up 13 wickets collectively. On 16 August 2024, in Canada's match against USA, Saad became the first Canadian to pick up 50 wickets in T20I .

In September 2024, he was named in Canada's ODI and T20I squad for the 2024 Canada Tri-Nation Series. He had an exceptional all-round performance as he finished the T20I series by being the leading run scorer and leading wicket taker for Canada In February, he was named in Canada's ODI and T20I squad for the 2025 Namibia Tri-Nation Series.

In April 2025, he was named in Canada's squad for 2025 North American Cup held in Cayman Islands. He finished the tournament by being the 2nd leading wicket taker and most economical bowler for Canada in the tournament with 9 wickets. In May 2025, he was named in Canada's squad for 2025 United States Tri-Nation Series

In June 2025, he was named in Canada's squad for 2025 Men's T20 World Cup Americas Qualifier. In the 9th match of the tournament against Bahamas, he became the first Canadian to pick up 100 international wickets for the country. In the 12th match of the tournament against Bermuda, he led Canadian players in T20I man of the match awards, having won it for the 6th time. In August 2025, he was named in Canada's squad for 2025 Canada Tri-Nation Series

In January 2026, he was named in Canada's squad for the 2026 ICC Men's T20 World Cup tournament. Canada couldn't secure any win in the tournament but he had a successful tournament by being the leading wicket-taker for Canada.

== Captaincy career ==
Record as captain
Format	Matches	Won	Lost	Tied	No result	Win %
ODI	19	8	10	0	1	42.1%
Twenty20	19	11	8	0	0	57.89%
List A	23	12	10	0	1	52.17%
Date last Updated:		08 August 2026				

In July 2022, he was appointed as the captain of Canada's squad against Nepal's tour of Canada which was scheduled for Nepal's preparation of 2022 Scotland Tri-Nation Series. The tour had two One Day matches scheduled but persistent rain had completely washed out the first match however in the second match Canada secured 83 runs convincing win over Nepal.

In July 2022, he was named the vice-captain of Canada's squad for the 2022 Canada Cricket World Cup Challenge League A tournament. In the sixth match of the tournament, against Malaysia, he took his first five-wicket haul in List A cricket.

In October 2022, he was named as the captain of Canada's Squad for the 2022 Desert Cup T20I Series and also for a bilateral 50-over-a-side three-match series against Oman to prepare for the final event of the 2019–2022 ICC Cricket World Cup Challenge League. On 14 November 2022, in Canada's Match against Bahrain, Saad scored unbeaten 29 off 7 balls which made him the second batsman to bat at a strike rate of 414.28, which is the highest strike rate in T20I innings. Saad had a very successful stint as the captain of Canada by winning both the T20I series as well as the One Day series of 2022 Desert Cup.

In November 2022, he was named as the captain of Canada's squad for the 2022 Malaysia Cricket World Cup Challenge League A tournament. In the forth match of the tournament against Singapore, he took his second Fifer of his international career. He finished the tournament being the third leading wicket taker of ICC Cricket World Cup Challenge League by taking 25 wickets in 14 matches.

In February 2023, he was appointed as the captain of Canada's squad for Canada's tour of Sri Lanka which consists of four One Day matches against Sri Lanka Development team for the preparation of 2023 ICC Cricket World Cup Qualifier Play-off

In March 2023, he was named as the captain of Canada's squad for the 2023 ICC Cricket World Cup Qualifier Play-off tournament hosted by Namibia. He made his One Day International (ODI) debut on 27 March 2023, for Canada, against Jersey in that tournament. Under his leadership, Canada successfully gained their ODI status back after 9 years and qualify for 2023–2027 ICC Cricket World Cup League 2

In September 2023, he was named as the captain of Canada's squad for the 2023 ICC Men's T20 World Cup Americas Qualifier. Saad displayed excellent leadership skills by winning 4 out of 5 matches which helped Canada qualify for their first ever ICC Men's T20 World cup

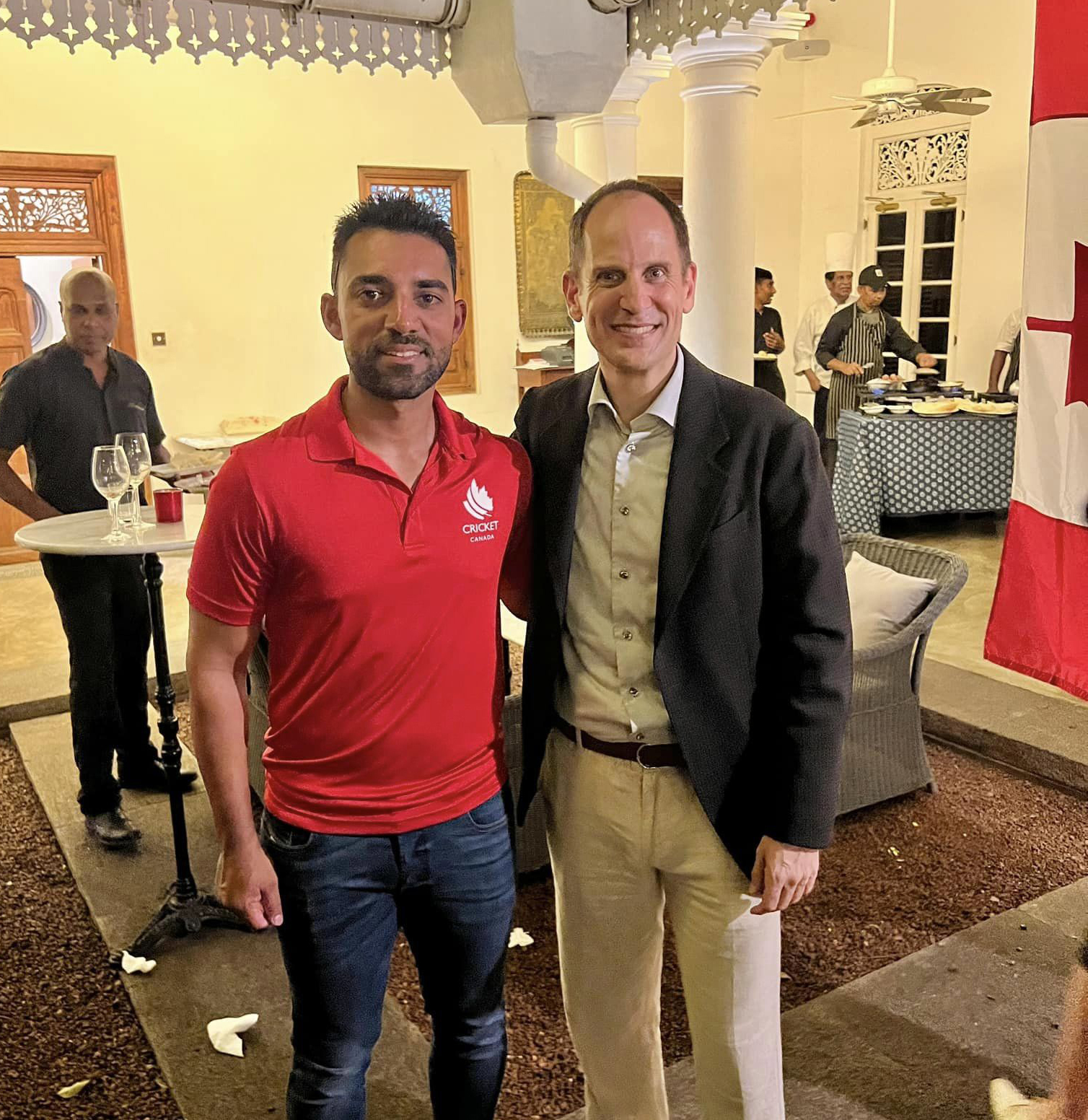
Saad with Ambassador Eric Walsh, During Team Canada's tour to Sri Lanka, 2023

In January 2024, he was named as the captain of Canada's squad for Canada's tour of Hong Kong which consist of One Day series against Hong Kong and Malaysia. In February 2024, he was named as the captain of Canada's squad for Canada's tour of Nepal which consist of three One Day International (ODI) matches.

In February 2024, he was named as the captain of Canada's squad for 2024 United Arab Emirates Tri-Nation Series (round 2). Team Canada did excellent in this round under his captaincy by staying unbeaten against UAE and Scotland.

In April 2024, he was announced as the captain of Canada's squad for Canada's tour of USA. The series forms part of both teams' preparation ahead of the 2024 ICC Men's T20 World Cup

In May 2024, he was named as the captain of Canada's squad for their debut for ICC Men's T20 World cup. On June 7 against Ireland, he led his team to pull off their first-ever win in the ICC Men's T20 World Cup.

In March 2026, he was named as the captain of Canada's squad for their 2026 North American Cup. In June 2026, he was announced as the captain of Canada's squad for 2026 Canada Tri-Nation Series. On June 2nd Under Saad's captaincy Canada secured their first ever historic ODI win over Netherland after 10 losses. In August 2026, he was announced as the captain of Canada's squad for 2026 Scotland Tri-Nation Series
