= 2022 Minor League Cricket final =

Cricket match

2022 Minor League Cricket season final
- Event: 2022 Minor League Cricket season
Seattle Thunderbolts	Atlanta Fire
157/5	147/9
20 overs	20 overs
- Seattle Thunderbolts won by 10 runs
- Date: August 28, 2022
- Venue: Church Street Park, Morrisville
- Player of the match: Shubham Ranjane (Seattle Thunderbolts)
- Umpires: Jermaine Lindo; Rushane Samuels
- Attendance: 3,500

The 2022 Minor League Cricket season final was a Twenty20 cricket match played on August 28, 2022, at Church Street Park, Morrisville between the Seattle Thunderbolts and the Atlanta Fire to determine the winner of the 2022 Minor League Cricket season of Minor League Cricket.

== Road to the final ==
During the group stage of the 2022 Minor League Cricket season (MiLC) each team played a total of 14 matches, two against each of the other side of its group and its neighboring group (i.e. Southern and Eastern, Central and Western). All matches took place in one of 25 venues chosen to be played in that season. The format for the group stage was a double round-robin. That meant all teams would face each other at least twice. The teams needed to qualify in the top 2 of their respective groups to qualify for the play-offs. The Thunderbolts finished 2nd in their group, while the Fire finished 1st. The Thunderbolts won 11 and lost 4 games, while the Fire won 9 and lost 4, with one game washed out. In the play-offs, the Thunderbolts defeated the Dallas Mustangs 2–0 in a 3-match-series to advance to the semi-finals, where they defeated the Silicon Valley Strikers by 6 runs to advance to the finals. The Fire defeated the Manhattan Yorkers 1–0 in a 3-match-series to advance to the semi-finals, where they defeated the New Jersey Stallions by 96 runs to advance to the finals.

== Match ==
The final match was played between the Seattle Thunderbolts and the Atlanta Fire at Church Street Park, Morrisville, North Carolina.

=== Summary ===
The Seattle Thunderbolts won the toss and elected to bowl. Corné Dry dismissed opening batter Rayyan Pathan for a duck on the third ball of the match to bring in captain Harmeet Singh. Singh accelerated the innings, hitting Steven Taylor for four fours, before being dismissed for 20 by Nasir Hossain. This brought in Shubham Ranjane to the crease with Andries Gous. Gous and Ranjane stretched together a 57-run partnership before Gous was caught out by Evroy Dyer off Taylor. Taylor then proceeded to take the wicket of Rishi Bhardwaj for 7. Ranjane then brought up fifty as Shadley van Schalkwyk launched Dry and Taylor for a flurry of boundaries. Ranjane eventually was dismissed for 51 by Taylor in the final over, with Schalkwyk and Prajith Mudi taking the Thunderbolts to 157/5 after 20.

Openers Steven Taylor and Zain Sayed got the Fire off to a good start, with Taylor smacking Schalkwyk and Bodugum for 3 fours, before being dismissed by Bodugum for 14. This brought in Aaron Jones to the crease by Sayed, who stitched a run-a-ball 58-run partnership, before season MVP Phani Simhadri dismissed Sayed for 26. Ranjane then came in to bowl, and immediately took the wicket of Nasir Hossain for 7, and Jahmar Hamilton for 4. Dry stuck around with Jones, with Jones bringing up his half-century, before departing for 64 off Ranjane. Ranjane then took the wicket of Amila Aponso the very next ball. Evroy Dyer was then dismissed by Simhadri for 6, and very next ball, Dry for 14. Jay Pathak was then run out in the final over for 3, as the Thunderbolts defeated the Fire by 10 runs to win the 2022 Minor League Cricket season.

== Scorecard ==
Notes:

- † indicates team captain
- * indicates not out

Toss: Seattle Thunderbolts won the toss and elected to bat.

Seattle Thunderbolts innings
Player	Status	Runs	Balls	4s	6s	Strike rate
Rayyan Pathan	c Hossain b Dry	0	3	0	0	0.00
Andries Gous	c Evroy Dyer b Taylor	48	44	6	1	109.09
†Harmeet Singh	b Hossain	20	11	5	0	181.82
Shubham Ranjane	c Aponso b Taylor	51	45	0	3	113.33
Rishi Bhardwaj	b Taylor	7	3	0	1	233.33
Shadley van Schalkwyk	*	27	14	3	1	192.86
Prajith Mudi	*	0	0	0	0	0.00
Jagroop Raina	did not bat	0	0	0	0	0.00
Phani Simhadri	did not bat	0	0	0	0	0.00
Rohan Posanipally	did not bat	0	0	0	0	0.00
Akhilesh Bodugum	did not bat	0	0	0	0	0.00
Extras (lb 2, w 2); Total 157/5 (20 overs)				14	6	7.85 RR

Fall of wickets: 0/1 (Rayyan Pathan, 0.3 ov), 49/2 (Harmeet Singh, 5.4 ov), 106/3 (Andries Gous, 15.1 ov), 114/4 (Rishi Bhardwaj, 15.5 ov), 149/5 (Shubham Ranjane, 19.4 ov)

Atlanta Fire bowling
Bowler	Overs	Maidens	Runs	Wickets	Econ	Wides	NBs
Corné Dry	4	0	29	1	7.25	0	0
Ateendra Subramanian	2	0	18	0	9.00	1	0
Evroy Dyer	1	0	17	0	17.00	1	0
Nasir Hossain	4	0	25	1	6.25	0	0
Amila Aponso	4	0	19	0	4.75	0	0
Steven Taylor	4	0	36	3	9.00	0	0
Aaron Jones	1	0	11	0	11.00	0	0

Target:' 158 runs from 20 overs at 7.85 RR

Atlanta Fire innings
Player	Status	Runs	Balls	4s	6s	Strike rate
Steven Taylor	c Raina b Bodugum	14	7	3	0	200.00
Zain Sayed	c Harmeet b Simhadri	26	25	0	1	104.00
Aaron Jones	b Ranjane	64	51	1	3	125.49
Nasir Hossain	lbw Ranjane	7	8	1	0	87.50
Jahmar Hamilton	c Harmeet b Ranjane	4	9	0	0	44.44
Corné Dry	b Simhadri	14	10	2	0	140.00
Amila Aponso	c Harmeet b Ranjane	0	1	0	0	0.00
Evroy Dyer	c Ranjane b Simhadri	6	4	1	0	150.00
Jay Pathak	run out (Ranjane/Gous)	3	2	0	0	150.00
Rishi Pandey	*	1	2	0	0	50.00
Ateendra Subramanian	*	3	2	0	0	150.00
Extras (lb 1, w 3, nb 1); Total 147/9 (20 overs)				8	4	7.35 RR

Fall of wickets: 1/15 (Steven Taylor, 1.2 ov), 73/2 (Zain Sayed, 10.2 ov), 84/3 (Nasir Hossain, 12.3 ov), 96/4 (Jahmar Hamilton, 14.5 ov), 132/5 (Aaron Jones, 17.4 ov), 132/6 (Amila Aponso), 140/7 (Evroy Dyer, 18.5 ov), 140/8 (Corné Dry, 18.6 ov), 143/9 (Jay Pathak, 19.2 ov)

Seattle Thunderbolts bowling
Bowler	Overs	Maidens	Runs	Wickets	Econ	Wides	NBs
Shadley van Schalkwyk	4	0	35	0	8.75	0	0
Akhilesh Bodugum	4	0	32	1	8.00	0	0
Phani Simhadri	4	0	37	3	9.25	3	1
Shubham Ranjane	4	0	21	4	5.25	0	0
Harmeet Singh	4	0	21	0	5.25	0	0
