= Smith Road Oval =

Cricket ground

- Interactive map of Smith Road Oval

Ground information
- Location: George Town, Grand Cayman
- Country: Cayman Islands
- Coordinates: 19°17′19″N 81°22′20″W
- Establishment: 2004

International information
- First T20I: 16 April 2022: Cayman Islands v Bahamas
- Last T20I: 17 April 2022: Cayman Islands v Bahamas
- As of 17 April 2022; Source: Cricinfo

Smith Road Oval is a premier cricket ground in George Town, Grand Cayman developed in 1973. It is located on the corner of Smith Road and Huldah Avenue, on the western side of Owen Roberts International Airport.

Smith Road Oval has been used for cricket since 2004. In April 2022, the ground was of one two venues for the first Twenty20 International (T20I) matches to be held in the Cayman Islands, when the Cayman Islands team hosted a bilateral series against Bahamas. These were the first official T20I matches to be played in the Cayman Islands since the International Cricket Council (ICC) granted full T20I status to all competitive matches between its members from 1 January 2019.
