= List of Bahamas Twenty20 International cricketers =

This is a list of Bahamas Twenty20 International cricketers.

In April 2018, the ICC decided to grant full Twenty20 International (T20I) status to all its members. Therefore, all Twenty20 matches played between Bahamas and other ICC members after 1 January 2019 are eligible for T20I status. Bahamas played their first T20I matches in November 2021 during the 2021 ICC T20 World Cup Americas Qualifier in Antigua.

This list comprises all members of the Bahamas cricket team who have played at least one T20I match. It is initially arranged in the order in which each player won his first Twenty20 cap. Where more than one player won his first Twenty20 cap in the same match, those players are listed alphabetically by surname.

== Key ==
General

- ‡ – Captain
- † – Wicket-keeper
- First – Year of debut
- Last – Year of latest game
- Mat – Number of matches played

Batting

- Runs – Runs scored in career
- HS – Highest score
- Avg – Runs scored per dismissal
- * – Batsman remained not out
- 50 – Number of half centuries

Bowling

- Balls – Balls bowled in career
- Wkt – Wickets taken in career
- BBI – Best bowling in an innings
- Ave – Average runs per wicket

Fielding

- Ca – Catches taken
- St – Stumpings affected

== List of players ==
Statistics are correct as of 27 June 2026.

Bahamas T20I cricketers
| General | | | | | Batting | | | | Bowling | | | | Fielding | | Ref |
| No. | Name | First | Last | Mat | Runs | HS | Avg | 50 | Balls | Wkt | BBI | Ave | Ca | St | Ref |
|---|---|---|---|---|---|---|---|---|---|---|---|---|---|---|---|
| 1 | Jonathan Barry | 2021 | 2026 | 18 | 197 | 30* | 17.90 | 0 | 211 | 10 | 3/20 | 29.80 | 4 | 0 | |
| 2 | Renford Davson | 2021 | 2026 | 18 | 161 | 40 | 11.50 | 0 | – | – | – | – | 2 | 0 | |
| 3 | Marlon Graham | 2021 | 2021 | 6 | 20 | 8 | 4.00 | 0 | 102 | 2 | 1/16 | 59.00 | 1 | 0 | |
| 4 | Everette Haven† | 2021 | 2026 | 15 | 23 | 6 | 3.83 | 0 | 30 | 4 | 3/12 | 6.50 | 4 | 1 | |
| 5 | Kervon Hinds | 2021 | 2025 | 28 | 383 | 60 | 13.67 | 2 | 594 | 32 | 5/18 | 18.68 | 15 | 0 | |
| 6 | Gregory Irvin | 2021 | 2026 | 6 | 5 | 4 | 5.00 | 0 | 102 | 5 | 3/22 | 23.80 | 0 | 0 | |
| 7 | Jagnauth Jagroo | 2021 | 2022 | 11 | 120 | 34 | 10.90 | 0 | 198 | 9 | 3/24 | 25.11 | 0 | 0 | |
| 8 | Roderick Mitchell | 2021 | 2021 | 5 | 2 | 1* | 2.00 | 0 | 120 | 5 | 2/24 | 33.40 | 2 | 0 | |
| 9 | Orlando Stewart | 2021 | 2021 | 5 | 12 | 12 | 2.40 | 0 | – | – | – | – | 0 | 0 | |
| 10 | Gregory Taylor‡† | 2021 | 2026 | 29 | 334 | 56* | 12.84 | 1 | 323 | 16 | 3/27 | 25.12 | 10 | 0 | |
| 11 | Marc Taylor‡ | 2021 | 2026 | 39 | 879 | 71* | 23.13 | 7 | 556 | 24 | 3/17 | 28.33 | 15 | 0 | |
| 12 | Bhumeshswar Jagroo | 2021 | 2022 | 9 | 14 | 5* | 14.00 | 0 | 60 | 3 | 2/34 | 32.33 | 3 | 0 | |
| 13 | Sandeep Goud | 2021 | 2025 | 28 | 169 | 29* | 9.38 | 0 | 199 | 6 | 1/11 | 50.83 | 4 | 0 | |
| 14 | Antonio Harris | 2021 | 2025 | 22 | 43 | 12 | 5.37 | 0 | 18 | 0 | – | – | 10 | 0 | |
| 15 | Festus Benn | 2022 | 2026 | 32 | 322 | 39* | 16.10 | 0 | 495 | 33 | 3/9 | 17.21 | 13 | 0 | |
| 16 | Rudolph Fox | 2022 | 2024 | 12 | 124 | 24* | 17.71 | 0 | 131 | 6 | 3/16 | 30.00 | 3 | 0 | |
| 17 | Julio Jemison† | 2022 | 2026 | 31 | 236 | 27 | 10.72 | 0 | – | – | – | – | 9 | 10 | |
| 18 | Dwight Wheatley | 2022 | 2026 | 28 | 211 | 32* | 10.55 | 0 | 12 | 0 | – | – | 5 | 0 | |
| 19 | Keith Burrows | 2022 | 2026 | 9 | 12 | 8* | 6.00 | 0 | 12 | 3 | 3/22 | 7.33 | 0 | 0 | |
| 20 | Turan Brown | 2023 | 2026 | 7 | 61 | 22* | 10.16 | 0 | 72 | 3 | 2/18 | 17.00 | 1 | 0 | |
| 21 | Narendra Ekanayake | 2023 | 2023 | 4 | 30 | 19 | 10.00 | 0 | 59 | 3 | 2/15 | 20.00 | 0 | 0 | |
| 22 | Junior Scott | 2023 | 2023 | 4 | 4 | 4 | 2.00 | 0 | 54 | 2 | 2/23 | 28.50 | 0 | 0 | |
| 23 | Eugene Duff | 2024 | 2025 | 15 | 125 | 31 | 8.92 | 0 | – | – | – | – | 3 | 0 | |
| 24 | Dwight Weakley | 2024 | 2024 | 15 | 31 | 20 | 6.20 | 0 | 270 | 14 | 2/5 | 22.28 | 1 | 0 | |
| 25 | Romaine Smith | 2024 | 2025 | 8 | 9 | 5 | 2.25 | 0 | 108 | 7 | 2/14 | 18.71 | 1 | 0 | |
| 26 | Ashok Nair | 2024 | 2025 | 3 | 1 | 1 | 0.50 | 0 | – | – | – | – | 0 | 0 | |
| 27 | Javelle Gallimore | 2024 | 2025 | 5 | 39 | 14* | 39.00 | 0 | 6 | 0 | – | – | 1 | 0 | |
| 28 | Ricardo Patten | 2025 | 2026 | 6 | 2 | 2* | 2.00 | 0 | 30 | 1 | 1/28 | 61.00 | 3 | 0 | |
| 29 | Ryan Tappin | 2025 | 2025 | 4 | 11 | 6 | 2.75 | 0 | 12 | 0 | – | – | 1 | 0 | |
| 30 | Shawn Fowler | 2025 | 2026 | 2 | – | – | – | – | – | – | – | – | 0 | 0 | |
| 31 | Akash Gulati | 2025 | 2026 | 12 | 6 | 4* | 6.00 | 0 | 84 | 4 | 2/23 | 34.50 | 3 | 0 | |
| 32 | Orville Howell | 2026 | 2026 | 1 | – | – | – | – | – | – | – | – | 0 | 0 | |
| 33 | Ahil Amburose | 2026 | 2026 | 3 | 0 | 0 | 0.00 | 0 | – | – | – | – | 0 | 0 | |
