= 2021 Men's T20 World Cup Americas qualifier =

Cricket tournament

The 2021 ICC Men's T20 World Cup Americas Qualifier was a cricket tournament that was played as part of the qualification process for the 2022 ICC Men's T20 World Cup. It took place in November 2021 in Antigua, with the top two teams progressing to one of two global qualifiers. In April 2018, the International Cricket Council (ICC) granted full international status to Twenty20 men's matches played between member sides from 1 January 2019 onwards. Therefore, all the matches in the Regional Qualifiers were played as Twenty20 Internationals (T20Is).

Originally the tournament was scheduled to take place from 18 to 24 August 2020. However, in June 2020, the tournament was postponed until 2021, due to the COVID-19 pandemic. In December 2020, the ICC updated the qualification pathway following the disruption from the pandemic. In May 2021, the tournament was postponed again due to the pandemic, after being scheduled to take place from 17 to 23 July 2021 in Toronto, Canada. The ICC confirmed all the fixtures for the Americas Qualifier in October 2021.

The United States became the first team to reach the Global Qualifiers, after they won their first five matches. Canada finished in second position to also secure their place in the Global Qualifiers.

== Regional Final ==
2021 ICC Men's T20 World Cup Americas Qualifier Regional Final
- Dates: 7 – 14 November 2021
- Administrator: Americas
- Cricket format: T20I
- Host: Antigua and Barbuda
- Champions: United States
- Participants: 7
- Matches: 21
- Most runs: (Canada) Rayyan Pathan (312)
- Most wickets: (Argentina) Hernán Fennell (11)

=== Squads ===
Argentina	Bahamas	Belize	Bermuda	Canada	Panama	United States
Hernán Fennell (c); Bruno Angeletti; Pedro Baron; Pedro Bruno; Ramiro Escobar (wk); Alejandro Ferguson; Jonathan Hurley; Agustin Husain; Alan Kirschbaum; Lautaro Musiani; Augusto Mustafa; Esteban Nino; Tomas Rossi; Martín Siri	Gregory Taylor (c, wk); Jonathan Barry; Festus Benn (wk); Renford Davson; Marlon Graham; Sandeep Goud; Antonio Harris; Everette Haven; Kervon Hinds; Gregory Irvin; Bhumeshwar Jagroo; Jagnauth Jagroo; Roderick Mitchell; Junior Scott; Orlando Stewart; Marc Taylor	Kenton Young (c, wk); Andrew Banner; Garret Banner; Glenford Banner; Nathan Banner; Winford Broaster; Cornel Brown; Maurice Castillo; Aaron Muslar; T'shaka Patterson; Travis Samuels; Bernan Stephenson; Travis Stephenson; Keagan Tillett; Muhammad Zaghlool	Kamau Leverock (c); Rodney Trott (vc); Okera Bascome (wk); Onias Bascome; Zeko Burgess; Jabari Darrell; Allan Douglas; Chris Douglas; Kyle Hodsoll; Malachi Jones; Tre Manders; Delray Rawlins; Dominic Sabir; Macai Simmons; Dion Stovell	Navneet Dhaliwal (c); Dillon Heyliger; Rishiv Joshi; Jatinderpal Matharu; Shreyas Movva; Salman Nazar; Hiral Patel; Rayyan Pathan; Cecil Pervez; Kaleem Sana; Junaid Siddiqui; Ravinderpal Singh; Hamza Tariq (wk); Harsh Thaker; Saad Bin Zafar; Aaditya Varadharajan	Yusuf Ebrahim (c); Anilkumar Natubhai Ahir (wk); Dineshbhai Ahir; Khengar Bhai Ahir; Nikunj Ahir; Yusuf Bhayat; Abdulla Bhoola; Yusuf Bhoola; Aslam Doria; Salim Guzman; Irfan Hafejee; Abdullah Jasat; Mahmud Jasat; Munaf Kachalia; Rizwan Mangera; Tayab Rawat; Mohmad Sohel Patel	Monank Patel (c, wk); Aaron Jones (vc); Trinson Carmichael; Karima Gore; Ian Holland; Elmore Hutchinson; Ali Khan; Jaskaran Malhotra (wk); Xavier Marshall; Saurabh Netravalkar; Nisarg Patel; Gajanand Singh; Steven Taylor; Rusty Theron

=== Points table ===
Pos	Team	Pld	W	L	NR	Pts	NRR
1	United States	6	6	0	0	12	3.064
2	Canada	6	5	1	0	10	5.312
3	Bermuda	6	4	2	0	8	2.283
4	Argentina	6	2	4	0	4	−0.350
5	Bahamas	6	2	4	0	4	−2.744
6	Panama	6	1	5	0	2	−3.468
7	Belize	6	1	5	0	2	−3.863

Source: ESPN Cricinfo, CricClubs

Advanced to the Global qualifier

=== Fixtures ===
7 November 2021
09:00
Scorecard

Belize; 64/9 (20 overs)	v	United States; 68/0 (4.2 overs)
Glenford Banner 28 (32); Rusty Theron 3/16 (4 overs)		Steven Taylor 39* (15)

United States won by 10 wickets
Coolidge Cricket Ground, Antigua
Umpires: Arnold Maddela (Can) and Leslie Reifer (WI)
Player of the match: Steven Taylor (USA)

- United States won the toss and elected to field.
- Cornel Brown, Maurice Castillo, Travis Samuels, Keagan Tillett (Blz), Ian Holland and Gajanand Singh (USA) all made their T20I debuts.
- Rusty Theron also made his T20I debut for United States after previously playing nine T20Is for South Africa, becoming the thirteenth cricketer to represent two international teams in T20Is.

7 November 2021
09:00
Scorecard

Canada; 190/5 (20 overs)	v	Bahamas; 68 (15.2 overs)
Hamza Tariq 54* (28); Jagnauth Jagroo 3/24 (4 overs)		Marc Taylor 44 (36); Jatinderpal Matharu 3/6 (2 overs)

Canada won by 122 runs
Sir Vivian Richards Stadium, Antigua
Umpires: Emmerson Carrington (Ber) and Jacqueline Williams (WI)
Player of the match: Hamza Tariq (Can)

- Bahamas won the toss and elected to field.
- Jonathan Barry, Renford Davson, Marlon Graham, Everette Haven, Kervon Hinds, Gregory Irvin, Jagnauth Jagroo, Roderick Mitchell, Orlando Stewart, Gregory Taylor, Marc Taylor (Bah), Jatinderpal Matharu, Rayyan Pathan and Cecil Pervez (Can) all made their T20I debuts.

7 November 2021
13:00
Scorecard

Panama; 85/8 (20 overs)	v	United States; 86/1 (9.2 overs)
Dineshbhai Ahir 16 (12); Ian Holland 2/3 (3 overs)		Xavier Marshall 47* (35); Dineshbhai Ahir 1/22 (2 overs)

United States won by 9 wickets
Coolidge Cricket Ground, Antigua
Umpires: Vijaya Mallela (USA) and Leslie Reifer (WI)
Player of the match: Ian Holland (USA)

- Panama won the toss and elected to bat.
- Dineshbhai Ahir, Aslam Doria, Salim Guzman, Irfan Hafejee, Abdullah Jasat, Mahmud Jasat, Rizwan Mangera (Pan) and Ali Khan (USA) all made their T20I debuts.

8 November 2021
09:00
Scorecard

Canada; 234/3 (20 overs)	v	Belize; 89/6 (20 overs)
Navneet Dhaliwal 69* (36); Kenton Young 2/37 (4 overs)		Kenton Young 42 (46); Cecil Pervez 3/7 (3 overs)

Canada won by 145 runs
Coolidge Cricket Ground, Antigua
Umpires: Harry Grewal (Can) and Vijaya Mallela (USA)
Player of the match: Navneet Dhaliwal (Can)

- Canada won the toss and elected to bat.
- T'shaka Patterson and Muhammad Zaghlool (Blz) both made their T20I debuts.

8 November 2021
09:00
Scorecard

Bahamas; 121 (18.2 overs)	v	Argentina; 109/5 (20 overs)
Marc Taylor 60 (37); Tomas Rossi 3/19 (3.2 overs)		Pedro Baron 66* (61); Jonathan Barry 2/20 (4 overs)

Bahamas won by 12 runs
Sir Vivian Richards Stadium, Antigua
Umpires: Emmerson Carrington (Ber) and Arnold Maddela (Can)
Player of the match: Marc Taylor (Bah)

- Bahamas won the toss and elected to bat.
- Pedro Bruno, Alan Kirschbaum, Tomas Rossi (Arg) and Bhumeshwar Jagroo (Bah) all made their T20I debuts.

8 November 2021
13:00
Scorecard

Belize; 143/8 (20 overs)	v	Panama; 131/8 (20 overs)
Bernan Stephenson 69 (47); Khengar Bhai Ahir 3/22 (4 overs)		Mahmud Jasat 20* (14); Bernan Stephenson 3/25 (3 overs)

Belize won by 12 runs
Coolidge Cricket Ground, Antigua
Umpires: Harry Grewal (Can) and Jacqueline Williams (WI)
Player of the match: Bernan Stephenson (Blz)

- Belize won the toss and elected to bat.
- Nathan Banner (Blz), Nikunj Ahir and Yusuf Bhoola (Pan) all made their T20I debuts.

8 November 2021
13:00
Scorecard

United States; 172 (19.4 overs)	v	Bermuda; 149/8 (20 overs)
Aaron Jones 50 (33); Kamau Leverock 4/28 (3.4 overs)		Tre Manders 49 (37); Steven Taylor 2/21 (3 overs)

United States won by 23 runs
Sir Vivian Richards Stadium, Antigua
Umpires: Arnold Maddela (Can) and Leslie Reifer (WI)
Player of the match: Aaron Jones (USA)

- United States won the toss and elected to bat.
- Tre Manders and Dominic Sabir (Ber) both made their T20I debuts.

10 November 2021
09:00
Scorecard

Bermuda; 239/6 (20 overs)	v	Bahamas; 99/8 (20 overs)
Tre Manders 84 (52); Gregory Taylor 3/27 (3 overs)		Kervon Hinds 40 (30); Malachi Jones 2/9 (4 overs)

Bermuda won by 140 runs
Coolidge Cricket Ground, Antigua
Umpires: Emmerson Carrington (Ber) and Leslie Reifer (WI)
Player of the match: Tre Manders (Ber)

- Bahamas won the toss and elected to field.
- Sandeep Goud (Bah) and Zeko Burgess (Ber) both made their T20I debuts.

10 November 2021
09:00
Scorecard

Argentina; 171/4 (20 overs)	v	Belize; 112 (18.5 overs)
Alejandro Ferguson 86* (60); Garret Banner 2/18 (4 overs)		Maurice Castillo 27 (19); Hernán Fennell 3/20 (3 overs)

Argentina won by 59 runs
Sir Vivian Richards Stadium, Antigua
Umpires: Arnold Maddela (Can) and Vijaya Mallela (USA)
Player of the match: Alejandro Ferguson (Arg)

- Argentina won the toss and elected to bat.

10 November 2021
13:00
Scorecard

Canada; 142/5 (20 overs)	v	United States; 142/8 (20 overs)
Navneet Dhaliwal 44 (37); Ravinderpal Singh 44 (37); Ian Holland 2/25 (4 overs)		Jaskaran Malhotra 35 (25); Salman Nazar 3/19 (4 overs)

Match tied
(United States won the Super Over)
Coolidge Cricket Ground, Antigua
Umpires: Harry Grewal (Can) and Leslie Reifer (WI)
Player of the match: Karima Gore (USA)

- Canada won the toss and elected to bat.
- Salman Nazar (Can) made his T20I debut.
- Super Over: United States 22/1, Canada 14/0

10 November 2021
13:00
Scorecard

Argentina; 156/6 (20 overs)	v	Panama; 111/9 (20 overs)
Ramiro Escobar 55 (45); Anilkumar Natubhai Ahir 4/26 (4 overs)		Khengar Bhai Ahir 32* (29); Hernán Fennell 6/18 (4 overs)

Argentina won by 45 runs
Sir Vivian Richards Stadium, Antigua
Umpires: Vijaya Mallela (USA) and Jacqueline Williams (WI)
Player of the match: Ramiro Escobar (Arg)

- Argentina won the toss and elected to bat.
- Augusto Mustafa and Esteban Nino (Arg) both made their T20I debuts.
- Hernán Fennell took his first five-wicket haul in T20Is and became the first bowler for Argentina to take a hat-trick in T20Is.

11 November 2021
09:00
Scorecard

Canada; 187/5 (20 overs)	v	Bermuda; 141/7 (20 overs)
Hamza Tariq 63* (28); Delray Rawlins 2/33 (4 overs)		Delray Rawlins 38 (34); Salman Nazar 2/17 (3 overs)

Canada won by 46 runs
Coolidge Cricket Ground, Antigua
Umpires: Arnold Maddela (Can) and Jacqueline Williams (WI)
Player of the match: Hamza Tariq (Can)

- Bermuda won the toss and elected to field.

11 November 2021
09:00
Scorecard

Bahamas; 150/8 (20 overs)	v	Belize; 139/6 (20 overs)
Marc Taylor 67 (50); Keagan Tillett 3/24 (3 overs)		Maurice Castillo 59 (49); Kervon Hinds 3/36 (4 overs)

Bahamas won by 11 runs
Sir Vivian Richards Stadium, Antigua
Umpires: Harry Grewal (Can) and Vijaya Mallela (USA)
Player of the match: Marc Taylor (Bah)

- Bahamas won the toss and elected to bat.
- Winford Broaster (Blz) made his T20I debut.

11 November 2021
13:00
Scorecard

Bermuda; 181/6 (20 overs)	v	Panama; 95/8 (20 overs)
Kamau Leverock 54 (31); Irfan Hafejee 3/36 (4 overs)		Irfan Hafejee 29 (43); Allan Douglas 2/17 (4 overs)

Bermuda won by 86 runs
Coolidge Cricket Ground, Antigua
Umpires: Arnold Maddela (Can) and Leslie Reifer (WI)
Player of the match: Kamau Leverock (Ber)

- Bermuda won the toss and elected to bat.

11 November 2021
13:00
Scorecard

Argentina; 90/7 (20 overs)	v	United States; 94/2 (13.3 overs)
Martín Siri 31 (43); Rusty Theron 2/5 (2 overs)		Gajanand Singh 50* (38); Hernán Fennell 1/21 (3.3 overs)

United States won by 8 wickets
Sir Vivian Richards Stadium, Antigua
Umpires: Emmerson Carrington (Ber) and Harry Grewal (Can)
Player of the match: Gajanand Singh (USA)

- Argentina won the toss and elected to bat.
- Trinson Carmichael (USA) made his T20I debut.

13 November 2021
09:00
Scorecard

Bahamas; 90/7 (20 overs)	v	United States; 91/0 (12.1 overs)
Kervon Hinds 23 (19); Nisarg Patel 4/17 (4 overs)		Aaron Jones 43* (41)

United States won by 10 wickets
Coolidge Cricket Ground, Antigua
Umpires: Arnold Maddela (Can) and Vijaya Mallela (USA)
Player of the match: Nisarg Patel (USA)

- Bahamas won the toss and elected to bat.
- Antonio Harris (Bah) made his T20I debut.

13 November 2021
09:00
Scorecard

Belize; 85 (18.5 overs)	v	Bermuda; 89/3 (8 overs)
Garret Banner 32 (21); Rodney Trott 4/15 (4 overs)		Allan Douglas 54 (25); Glenford Banner 1/24 (2 overs)

Bermuda won by 7 wickets
Sir Vivian Richards Stadium, Antigua
Umpires: Emmerson Carrington (Ber) and Jacqueline Williams (WI)
Player of the match: Allan Douglas (Ber)

- Belize won the toss and elected to bat.
- Jabari Darrell (Ber) made his T20I debut.

13 November 2021
13:00
Scorecard

Panama; 139/8 (20 overs)	v	Bahamas; 113 (18.3 overs)
Irfan Hafejee 41 (39); Gregory Taylor 2/24 (3 overs)		Jonathan Barry 22 (20); Irfan Hafejee 3/26 (3.3 overs)

Panama won by 26 runs
Coolidge Cricket Ground, Antigua
Umpires: Vijaya Mallela (USA) and Leslie Reifer (WI)
Player of the match: Irfan Hafejee (Pan)

- Bahamas won the toss and elected to field.

13 November 2021
13:00
Scorecard

Argentina; 109 (18 overs)	v	Canada; 115/1 (9.1 overs)
Alejandro Ferguson 23 (20); Dillon Heyliger 5/16 (4 overs)		Rayyan Pathan 56* (24); Alan Kirschbaum 1/21 (2.1 overs)

Canada won by 9 wickets
Sir Vivian Richards Stadium, Antigua
Umpires: Emmerson Carrington (Ber) and Harry Grewal (Can)
Player of the match: Dillon Heyliger (Can)

- Argentina won the toss and elected to bat.
- Dillon Heyliger became the first bowler for Canada to take a five-wicket haul in T20Is.

14 November 2021
09:00
Scorecard

Canada; 245/1 (20 overs)	v	Panama; 37 (17.2 overs)
Rayyan Pathan 107* (62); Dineshbhai Ahir 1/30 (4 overs)		Irfan Hafejee 14 (21); Salman Nazar 3/8 (4 overs)

Canada won by 208 runs
Coolidge Cricket Ground, Antigua
Umpires: Emmerson Carrington (Ber) and Jacqueline Williams (WI)
Player of the match: Rayyan Pathan (Can)

- Canada won the toss and elected to bat.
- Rishiv Joshi and Shreyas Movva (Can) both made their T20I debuts.
- Rayyan Pathan (Can) scored his first century in T20Is.
- Saad Bin Zafar (Can) became the first bowler to bowl four overs in a T20I match without conceding a run.

14 November 2021
13:00
Scorecard

Argentina; 130/5 (20 overs)	v	Bermuda; 133/7 (19.2 overs)
Martín Siri 28* (25); Allan Douglas 3/28 (4 overs)		Tre Manders 37 (41); Agustin Husain 3/8 (4 overs)

Bermuda won by 3 wickets
Coolidge Cricket Ground, Antigua
Umpires: Leslie Reifer (WI) and Jacqueline Williams (WI)
Player of the match: Allan Douglas (Ber)

- Argentina won the toss and elected to bat.
