= Salman Nazar =

Canadian cricketer

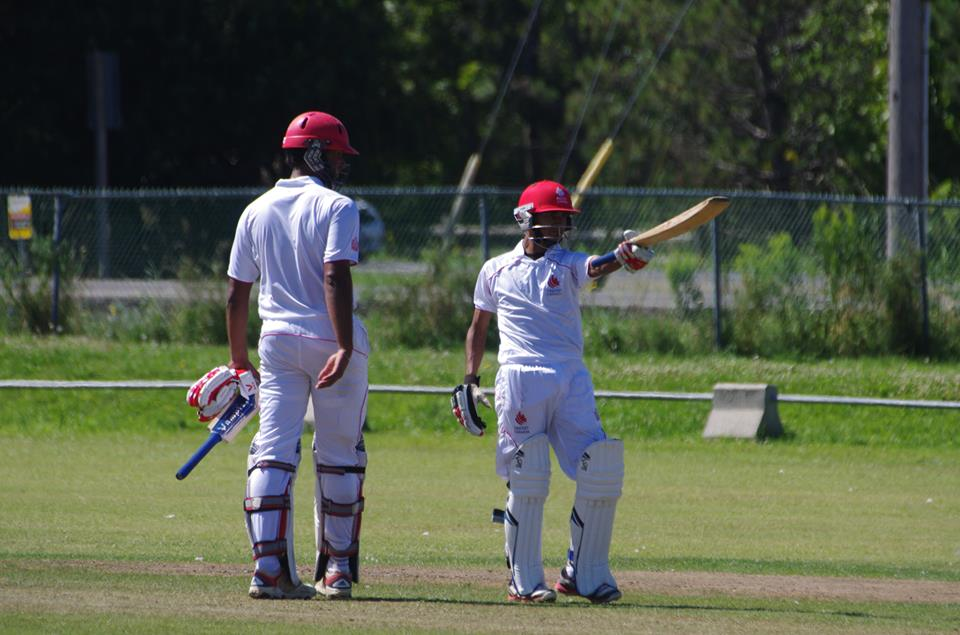
- Salman in August 2013

Personal information
- Full name: Salman Bin Nazar
- Born: 29 March 1991 (age 35); Multan, Punjab, Pakistan
- Nickname: Sal
- Batting: Left-handed
- Bowling: Slow left-arm orthodox
- Role: All-rounder

International information
- National side: Canada
- T20I debut (cap 57): 10 November 2021 v United States
- Last T20I: 14 November 2022 v Bahrain

Career statistics
Competition	T20I	FC	LA	T20
Matches	7	1	7	10
Runs scored	10	60	74	10
Batting average	10.00	60.00	19.55	5.00
100s/50s	0/0	0/1	0/0	0/0
Top score	10	60	55	10
Balls bowled	156	–	272	192
Wickets	14	–	6	14
Bowling average	10.85	–	70.22	13.97
5 wickets in innings	0	–	0	0
10 wickets in match	0	–	0	0
Best bowling	3/8	–	3/60	3/8
Catches/stumpings	2/–	1/–	1/–	2/–
- Source: ESPNcricinfo, 14 November 2022

Salman Nazar (born 29 March 1991) is a Canadian cricketer who plays as a bowler for the Canada national cricket team. Salman is a left-handed batsman and a slow left-arm orthodox bowler. He is regarded as one of the best fielders of Canada. Salman's consistency as a bowling all-rounder has been admired in Canada's domestic circuit for over a decade.

== Career ==
Salman Nazar scored 60 runs off 76 balls on his first-class debut, against the Netherlands on 22 August 2013.

In 2012, Salman made his debut in Twenty20 for Canada in Caribbean Twenty20 what's now known as Caribbean Premier League. After the tour, Salman decided to spend a summer in England, and signed a contract with Spring View Cricket Club in the Bolton Cricket Association. He finished the 2012 season with 100 wickets, which included 10 five-wicket hauls at bowling average of 11.05 and a best of 9/64.

On 3 June 2018, he was selected to play for the Vancouver Knights in the players' draft for the inaugural edition of the Global T20 Canada tournament. In October 2018, he was named in Canada's squad for the 2018–19 Regional Super50 tournament in the West Indies. He made his List A debut for Canada in the 2018–19 Regional Super50 tournament on 3 October 2018.

In June 2019, he was selected to play for the Toronto Nationals franchise team in the 2019 Global T20 Canada tournament.

In October 2021, he was named in Canada's Twenty20 International (T20I) squad for the 2021 ICC Men's T20 World Cup Americas Qualifier tournament in Antigua. He made his T20I debut on 10 November 2021, for Canada against the United States. In February 2022, he was named in Canada's squad for the 2022 ICC Men's T20 World Cup Global Qualifier A tournament in Oman.

ICC Men's World Cricket League

Salman Nazar scored a half century for Canada vs Vanuatu when Vanuatu had the start and held Canada to 4 wickets down for 30 runs in the first 45 mins of the game. Salman walked in to bat at #6 and put up the second highest partnership of ICC world Cricket League alongside N. Kirton, and dedicated the knock to his late father Syed Nazar Hussain Shah in the celebration on field.
