= Bahamas Cricket Association =

Official governing body of cricket in The Bahamas

Bahamas Cricket Association is the official governing body of the sport of cricket in The Bahamas. It is the island country's representative at the International Cricket Council and is an associate member and has been a member of that body since 1986. It is included in the ICC Americas region.

== See also ==
- Bahamas national cricket team
- Bahamas women's national cricket team
- Bahamas women's national under-19 cricket team
- Bahamas national under-19 cricket team
