= Rayyan Pathan =

Canadian cricketer (born 1991)

Personal information
- Full name: Rayyankhan Pathan
- Born: 6 December 1991 (age 34); Toronto, Ontario, Canada
- Batting: Right-handed
- Bowling: Right-arm medium-fast
- Role: Bowler

International information
- National side: Canada
- Only ODI (cap 84): 13 March 2013 v Kenya
- T20I debut (cap 55): 7 November 2021 v Bahamas
- Last T20I: 26 August 2024 v Netherlands

Career statistics
Competition	ODI	T20I
Matches	1	14
Runs scored	2	477
Batting average	2.00	39.75
100s/50s	0/0	1/3
Top score	2	107*
Balls bowled	36	12
Wickets	2	0
Bowling average	25	–
5 wickets in innings	0	–
10 wickets in match	0	–
Best bowling	2/50	–
Catches/stumpings	0/–	0/–
- Source: ESPNcricinfo, 31 October 2024

Rayyan Pathan (born 6 December 1991) is a Canadian cricketer. He debuted for the Canada national cricket team in 2013. He plays as a right-handed batsman and right-arm fast-medium bowler.

== Early life ==
Pathan was born in Toronto. He represented the Canada Under-19s at the 2011 Under-19 Cricket World Cup Qualifier in Ireland, following in the footsteps of his older brother Riyaz "Rizzy" Pathan who played at the 2010 Under-19 Cricket World Cup.

== Career ==
Pathan made his One Day International (ODI) debut against Kenya in March 2013.

On 3 June 2018, he was selected to play for the Montreal Tigers in the players' draft for the inaugural edition of the Global T20 Canada tournament. In June 2019, he was selected to play for the Vancouver Knights franchise team in the 2019 Global T20 Canada tournament. In October 2019, he was named in Canada's squad for the 2019–20 Regional Super50 tournament in the West Indies.

In June 2021, he was selected to take part in the Minor League Cricket tournament in the United States following the players' draft. In September 2021, he played for Biratnagar Warriors in Nepal's franchise league Everest Premier League. In October 2021, he was named in Canada's Twenty20 International (T20I) squad for the 2021 ICC Men's T20 World Cup Americas Qualifier tournament in Antigua. He made his T20I debut on 7 November 2021, for Canada against the Bahamas. In February 2022, he was named in Canada's squad for the 2022 ICC Men's T20 World Cup Global Qualifier A tournament in Oman.

Pathan also played in the 2023 Global T20 Canada, as a member of the Vancouver Knights team.

In May 2024, he was named in Canada’s squad for the 2024 ICC Men's T20 World Cup tournament.
