= Jonathan Barry =

Bahamian cricketer

Personal information
- Full name: Jonathan Renaldo Barry
- Born: 20 June 1988 (age 38); Bahamas
- Batting: Right-handed
- Bowling: Right-arm medium

International information
- National side: Bahamas
- T20I debut (cap 1): 7 November 2021 v Canada
- Last T20I: 4 March 2023 v Bermuda

Career statistics
Competition	T20I	T20
Matches	6	8
Runs scored	72	74
Batting average	12.00	9.25
100s/50s	0/0	0/0
Top score	22	22
Balls bowled	72	72
Wickets	2	2
Bowling average	49.00	49.00
5 wickets in innings	0	0
10 wickets in match	0	0
Best bowling	2/20	2/20
Catches/stumpings	1/–	1/–
- Source: Cricinfo, 5 March 2023

Jonathan Renaldo Barry (born 20 June 1988) is a Bahamian cricketer. Barry is a right-handed batsman who bowls right-arm medium pace and currently represents the Bahamas national cricket team.

Barry made his Twenty20 debut for the Bahamas against the Cayman Islands in the 1st round of the 2006 Stanford 20/20. He played his second and final Twenty20 match to date for the Bahamas in the 1st round of the 2008 Stanford 20/20 against Jamaica.

Barry represented the Bahamas in 2008 ICC World Cricket League Division Five and the 2010 ICC Americas Championship Division 2. Barry represented the Bahamas in the 2010 ICC Americas Championship Division 1.

In July 2019, he was named in the Bahamian squad for their tour of Bermuda.

In October 2021, Barry was named in the Bahamas Twenty20 International (T20I) squad for the 2021 ICC Men's T20 World Cup Americas Qualifier tournament in Antigua. He made his T20I debut on 7 November 2021, for the Bahamas against Canada.
