= Cecil Pervez =

Canadian cricketer

Personal information
- Full name: Cecil Pervez Khan
- Born: 22 July 1984 (age 42); Pakistan
- Batting: Right-handed
- Bowling: Right-arm medium-fast
- Role: Bowler

International information
- National side: Canada (2011–2021)
- T20I debut (cap 56): 7 November 2021 v Bahamas
- Last T20I: 13 November 2021 v Argentina
- Source: Cricinfo, 15 November 2021

Cecil Pervez (born 22 July 1984) is a Canadian cricketer who plays for the Canada national cricket team.

== Career ==
He played for Canada in the 2011–13 ICC World Cricket League Championship. In January 2018, he was named in Canada's squad for the 2018 ICC World Cricket League Division Two tournament.

On 3 June 2018, he was selected to play for the Montreal Tigers in the players' draft for the inaugural edition of the Global T20 Canada tournament. In September 2018, he was named in Canada's squad for the 2018–19 ICC World Twenty20 Americas Qualifier tournament. In October 2018, he was named in Canada's squad for the 2018–19 Regional Super50 tournament in the West Indies.

In April 2019, he was named in Canada's squad for the 2019 ICC World Cricket League Division Two tournament in Namibia. He was named as one of the six players to watch during the tournament.

In August 2019, he was named in Canada's squad for the Regional Finals of the 2018–19 ICC T20 World Cup Americas Qualifier tournament. In September 2019, he was named in Canada's squad for the 2019 Malaysia Cricket World Cup Challenge League A tournament.

In October 2021, he was named in Canada's Twenty20 International (T20I) squad for the 2021 ICC Men's T20 World Cup Americas Qualifier tournament in Antigua. He made his T20I debut on 7 November 2021, for Canada against the Bahamas.
