= Mohammad Qazi =

Pakistani-born Canadian cricketer (born 1984)

Personal information
- Full name: Mohammad Qazi
- Born: 23 April 1984 (age 42); Pakistan
- Batting: Right-handed
- Bowling: Right-arm medium
- Role: Batsman

International information
- National side: Canada (2008)
- Only T20I (cap 12): 5 August 2008 v Bermuda

Career statistics
Competition	T20I
Matches	1
Runs scored	0
Batting average	0.00
100s/50s	0/0
Top score	0
Balls bowled	–
Wickets	–
Bowling average	–
5 wickets in innings	–
10 wickets in match	–
Best bowling	–
Catches/stumpings	0/–
- Source: ESPNCricinfo, 17 January 2009

Mohammad Qazi (born 23 April 1984) is a cricketer, born in Pakistan, who has played one Twenty20 International for Canada.
