= Shreyas Movva =

Canadian cricketer (born 1993)

Personal information
- Full name: Shreyas Vasudevareddy Movva
- Born: 4 September 1993 (age 33); Guntur, Andhra Pradesh, India
- Batting: Right handed
- Role: Wicketkeeper batter

International information
- National side: Canada (2021–present)
- ODI debut (cap 99): 8 February 2024 v Nepal
- Last ODI: 26 September 2024 v Oman
- T20I debut (cap 59): 14 November 2021 v Panama
- Last T20I: 3 October 2024 v Oman
- Source: Cricinfo, 31 October 2024

Shreyas Movva (born 4 September 1993) is an Indian-born Canadian cricketer who plays for Canadian national cricket team since 2021.

== Early life and education ==
Movva was born in Guntur, Andhra Pradesh, India and moved to Montreal in 2016 to attend Concordia University, where he studied software engineering. He was the first player from Quebec to be selected for Canada in twelve years.

== Career ==
In October 2019, he was named as the vice-captain of Canada's squad for the 2019–20 Regional Super50 tournament in the West Indies. He made his List A debut on 8 November 2019, for Canada against the Leeward Islands, in the Regional Super50 tournament.

In October 2021, he was named in Canada's Twenty20 International (T20I) squad for the 2021 ICC Men's T20 World Cup Americas Qualifier tournament in Antigua. He made his Twenty20 International (T20I) debut for Canada against Panama in the Regional Finals of the 2021 ICC Men's T20 World Cup Americas Qualifier tournament on 14 November 2021. In February 2022, he was named in Canada's squad for the 2022 ICC Men's T20 World Cup Global Qualifier A tournament in Oman.

In May 2024, he was named in Canada's squad for the 2024 ICC Men's T20 World Cup tournament.
