= Julio Jemison =

Bahamian footballer

Personal information
- Date of birth: 24 February 1994 (age 32)
- Height: 1.78 m (5 ft 10 in)
- Position: Goalkeeper

Team information
- Current team: University of the Bahamas FC

Senior career*
Years	Team	Apps	(Gls)
2018–	University of the Bahamas FC		

International career^{‡}
2018–	Bahamas	1	(0)
- Cricket career
Cricket information
- Batting: Right-handed
- Role: Wicket-keeper
International information
- National side: Bahamas
- T20I debut (cap 17): 13 April 2022 v Cayman Islands
- Last T20I: 22 June 2025 v Cayman Islands
Career statistics
Competition	T20I	T20
Matches	27	27
Runs scored	181	181
Batting average	9.05	9.05
100s/50s	0/0	0/0
Top score	25*	25*
Catches/stumpings	7/7	7/7
- Source: Cricinfo, 29 September 2025
- * Club domestic league appearances and goals as of 18 January 2019 ‡ National team caps and goals as of 18 January 2019

Julio Jemison (born 24 February 1994) is a Bahamian footballer who plays for University of the Bahamas FC and the Bahamas national football team. Jemison has also represented his national team in T20I cricket matches.

== Football career ==
Jemison made his senior international debut on 12 October 2018 in a 6–0 defeat to Antigua and Barbuda in CONCACAF Nations League qualifying.

== Cricket career ==
In April 2022, he was named in the Bahamas' Twenty20 International (T20I) squad for their series against the Cayman Islands. He made his T20I debut on 13 April 2022, for the Bahamas against the Cayman Islands.
