= Harsh Thaker =

Canadian cricketer (born 1997)

Personal information
- Full name: Harsh Tusharbhai Thaker
- Born: 24 October 1997 (age 29); Ahmedabad, India
- Batting: Right-handed
- Bowling: Right-arm off break
- Role: All-Rounder

International information
- National side: Canada (2019–2026)
- ODI debut (cap 93): 27 March 2023 v Jersey
- Last ODI: 25 May 2025 v United States
- T20I debut (cap 51): 25 August 2019 v United States
- Last T20I: 22 June 2025 v Bermuda

Career statistics
Competition	ODI	T20I	LA	T20
Matches	26	50	52	50
Runs scored	769	706	1,442	706
Batting average	34.95	24.34	34.33	24.34
100s/50s	2/3	0/1	2/7	0/1
Top score	111*	53*	111*	53*
Balls bowled	1083	760	1,473	760
Wickets	23	39	34	39
Bowling average	34.39	19.82	31.35	19.82
5 wickets in innings	0	0	0	0
10 wickets in match	0	0	0	0
Best bowling	3/41	4/20	3/24	4/20
Catches/stumpings	12/–	12/–	20/–	12/–
- Source: Cricinfo, 5 August 2025

Harsh Tusharbhai Thaker (born 24 October 1997) is a Canadian cricketer. He made his senior debut for the Canada national cricket team in 2018. He plays as an all-rounder batting right-handed and bowling right-arm off spin.

== Career ==
Thaker represented Canada at the 2016 Under-19 Cricket World Cup in Bangladesh.

He made his List A debut for Canada in the 2018–19 Regional Super50 tournament on 3 October 2018. Prior to his List A debut, he was named in Canada's squad for the 2016 Under-19 Cricket World Cup. In June 2019, he was selected to play for the Vancouver Knights franchise team in the 2019 Global T20 Canada tournament.

In August 2019, He was named in Canada's squad for the Regional Finals of the 2018–19 ICC T20 World Cup Americas Qualifier tournament. He made his Twenty20 International (T20I) debut for Canada against the United States on 25 August 2019. In September 2019, he was named in Canada's squad for the 2019 Malaysia Cricket World Cup Challenge League A tournament. The following month, he was named in Canada's squad for the 2019–20 Regional Super50 tournament in the West Indies.

In October 2021, He was named in Canada's squad for the 2021 ICC Men's T20 World Cup Americas Qualifier tournament in Antigua. In February 2022, he was named in Canada's squad for the 2022 ICC Men's T20 World Cup Global Qualifier A tournament in Oman.

In March 2023, He was named in Canada's squad for the 2023 Cricket World Cup Qualifier Play-off. He made his One Day International (ODI) debut on 27 March 2023, for Canada, against Jersey in that tournament.

In May 2024, he was named in Canada’s squad for the 2024 ICC Men's T20 World Cup tournament.

In June 2025, Thaker scored a half-century in just 16 balls during a T20 World Cup Americas Qualifier match against Cayman Islands, setting the record for the fastest half-century for Canada in international cricket. The record, however, was broken by Yuvraj Samra in less than a week from after Thaker achieved his feat.
