= Shahid Ahmadzai =

Canadian cricketer

Personal information
- Born: 15 November 1988 (age 38); Kandahar, Afghanistan
- Batting: Left-handed
- Bowling: Slow left-arm orthodox
- Role: All-Rounder

International information
- National side: Canada (2017–present)
- ODI debut (cap 96): 8 February 2024 v Nepal
- Last ODI: 10 February 2024 v Nepal
- T20I debut (cap 67): 4 October 2023 v Cayman Islands
- Last T20I: 19 March 2025 v Namibia
- Source: Cricinfo, 10 October 2023

Shahid Ahmadzai (born 15 November 1988) is an Afghan-Canadian cricketer who plays for the Canada national cricket team. He debuted for Canada in 2017, having earlier played for the Afghanistan national under-19 cricket team. He made an asylum claim in Canada in 2009 and was granted permanent residency in 2019.

== Early life ==
Ahmadzai grew up as a refugee in Peshawar, Pakistan. According to his asylum claim in Canada, his father and older brother were killed in 2002 by relatives associated with the Taliban. After his family returned to Afghanistan, he attended Sayed Noor Mohammad Shah Mina High School in Kabul. He played street cricket from the age of 12 and was selected in the country's under-15, under-17 and under-19 national squads.

== Asylum claim ==
Ahmadzai represented the Afghanistan national under-19 cricket team at the 2009 Under-19 Cricket World Cup Qualifier in Toronto. After the tournament's conclusion, he and four teammates refused to return to Afghanistan and sought asylum in Canada. His asylum claim was not heard until 2013 and was initially rejected, but he was allowed to remain in Canada on an open work permit. He completed his high school in Toronto and subsequently worked in factories, retail, plumbing and as an Uber driver. Ahmadzai applied for Canadian permanent residency on three occasions, eventually being granted the status in 2019. His second application was rejected but the decision was overturned by the Federal Court on appeal.

== Career in Canada ==
Ahmadzai continued to play recreationally in Toronto after claiming asylum, playing for the Toronto Cricket Academy and the Canadian Cricket Club. In 2017 he made his debut for Canada in the Auty Cup fixture against the United States.

In June 2019, he was selected to play for the Edmonton Royals franchise team in the 2019 Global T20 Canada tournament. In September 2019, he was named in Canada's squad for the 2019 Malaysia Cricket World Cup Challenge League A tournament. The following month, he was named in Canada's squad for the 2019–20 Regional Super50 tournament in the West Indies. He made his List A debut on 8 November 2019, for Canada in the 2019–20 Regional Super50 tournament.

In September 2023, he was named in Canada's T20I squad for the 2023 ICC Men's T20 World Cup Americas Qualifier. He made his Twenty20 International debut for Canada on 4 October 2023 against Cayman Islands in the 2023 ICC Men's T20 World Cup Americas Qualifier. He did not bat or bowl on debut.

In February 2024, he was selected to Canada's ODI squad for the series against Nepal. He made his One Day International debut against Nepal on 8 February 2024.
