= Abzal Dean =

Trinidadian cricketer (born 1983)

Personal information
- Full name: Abzal S. Dean
- Born: 23 February 1983 (age 43); San Fernando, Trinidad
- Batting: Left-handed
- Bowling: Right-arm off-break
- Role: Bowler

International information
- National side: Canada (2008–2013)
- T20I debut (cap 20): 12 October 2008 v Sri Lanka
- Last T20I: 26 November 2013 v Sri Lanka

Career statistics
Competition	T20I
Matches	1
Runs scored	7
Batting average	7.00
100s/50s	0/0
Top score	7
Balls bowled	12
Wickets	2
Bowling average	9.00
5 wickets in innings	0
10 wickets in match	0
Best bowling	2/18
Catches/stumpings	0/–
- Source: CricketArchive, 17 January 2009

Abzal S. Dean (born 23 February 1983) is a cricketer who has played one Twenty20 International for Canada. He was born at San Fernando, Trinidad and Tobago in 1983.
