= List of Canada Twenty20 International cricketers =

This is a list of Canadian Twenty20 International cricketers.

A Twenty20 International (T20I) is an international cricket match between two teams that have official ODI status, as determined by the International Cricket Council. It is played under the rules of Twenty20 cricket and is the shortest form of the game. The first such match was played on 17 February 2005 between Australia and New Zealand. The Canada national cricket team played its first T20I match on 2 August 2008, against the Netherlands as part of the 2008 ICC World Twenty20 Qualifier, winning the match by 4 wickets.

This list comprises all members of the Canada national cricket team who have played at least one T20I match. It is initially arranged in the order in which each player won his first Twenty20 cap. Where more than one player won his first Twenty20 cap in the same match, those players are listed alphabetically by surname.

== Key ==
General

- ‡ – Captain
- † – Wicket-keeper
- First – Year of debut
- Last – Year of latest game
- Mat – Number of matches played

Batting

- Runs – Runs scored in career
- HS – Highest score
- 50 – Half-centuries scored
- 100 – Centuries scored
- Avg – Runs scored per dismissal
- * – Batsman remained not out

Bowling

- Balls – Balls bowled in career
- Wkt – Wickets taken in career
- BBI – Best bowling in an innings
- Ave – Average runs per wicket

Fielding

- Ca – Catches taken
- St – Stumpings taken

== Players ==
Statistics are correct as of 19 February 2026.

General					Batting					Bowling				Fielding		Ref(s)
Cap	Name	First	Last	Mat	Runs	HS	Avg	50	100	Balls	Wkt	BBI	Ave	Ca	St	Ref(s)
1	Ashish Bagai‡†	2008	2013	9	284	67*	40.57	2	0	–	–	–	–	5	6	
2	Harvir Baidwan	2008	2013	17	54	21	6.00	0	0	323	27	4/19	15.22	7	0	
3	Geoff Barnett	2008	2010	5	131	36	32.75	0	0	6	0	–	–	2	0	
4	John Davison	2008	2010	5	44	19	8.80	0	0	108	4	2/19	22.75	2	0	
5	Sunil Dhaniram‡	2008	2010	11	100	26	11.11	0	0	202	6	2/9	32.00	4	0	
6	Karun Jethi	2008	2008	5	41	24	10.25	0	0	–	–	–	–	1	0	
7	Eion Katchay	2008	2008	4	15	8*	15.00	0	0	60	3	1/18	23.66	0	0	
8	Henry Osinde	2008	2013	11	31	17	7.75	0	0	210	10	3/36	25.00	7	0	
9	Abdool Samad	2008	2010	7	97	29	16.16	0	0	12	1	1/36	36.00	1	0	
10	Zubin Surkari	2008	2008	4	10	6	3.33	0	0	–	–	–	–	0	0	
11	Sanjayan Thuraisingam‡	2008	2008	3	18	15	18.00	0	0	47	2	1/13	22.00	0	0	
12	Mohammad Qazi	2008	2008	1	0	0	0.00	0	0	–	–	–	–	0	0	
13	Steven Welsh	2008	2008	1	–	–	–	–	–	18	2	2/6	3.00	2	0	
14	Balaji Rao	2008	2008	4	32	22*	10.66	0	0	84	6	3/21	17.83	1	0	
15	Umar Bhatti	2008	2010	7	49	12	12.25	0	0	138	8	3/23	18.50	0	0	
16	Manoj David	2008	2008	4	39	17	9.75	0	0	–	–	–	–	2	0	
17	Mohammad Iqbal	2008	2008	3	27	22	9.00	0	0	–	–	–	–	0	0	
18	Asif Mulla†	2008	2008	4	11	8	2.75	0	0	–	–	–	–	1	2	
19	Rizwan Cheema‡	2008	2019	24	389	72	17.68	2	0	300	9	2/19	42.44	11	0	
20	Abzal Dean	2008	2013	2	8	7	4.00	0	0	24	2	2/18	16.00	1	0	
21	Sandeep Jyoti	2008	2008	2	10	10*	10.00	0	0	–	–	–	–	0	0	
22	Trevin Bastiampillai	2010	2010	2	–	–	–	–	–	–	–	–	–	0	0	
23	Shaheed Keshvani	2010	2010	2	0	0*	–	0	0	–	–	–	–	1	0	
24	Khurram Chohan	2010	2010	4	18	8	9.00	0	0	73	1	1/24	106.00	1	0	
25	Hiral Patel	2010	2021	15	294	88*	21.00	2	0	71	2	2/23	48.50	3	0	
26	Usman Limbada	2010	2013	7	53	21*	53.00	0	0	–	–	–	–	1	0	
27	Ian Billcliff	2010	2010	2	51	37	25.50	0	0	–	–	–	–	0	0	
28	Arsalan Qadir	2010	2010	1	–	–	–	–	–	6	0	–	–	0	0	
29	Rustam Bhatti†	2012	2012	4	25	11*	8.33	0	0	–	–	–	–	1	1	
30	Ruvindu Gunasekera	2012	2013	8	202	65	25.25	1	0	–	–	–	–	0	0	
31	Jimmy Hansra	2012	2013	8	82	30	13.66	0	0	90	7	2/13	13.42	2	0	
32	Junaid Siddiqui	2012	2024	22	51	21	10.20	0	0	427	15	3/10	26.66	3	0	
33	Nitish Kumar‡ (Note: Nitish Kumar also played T20I cricket for USA. Only his records for Canada are given above.)	2012	2019	18	434	83	31.00	3	0	156	7	2/18	22.85	5	0	
34	Raza-ur-Rehman	2012	2013	5	25	10	6.25	0	0	54	2	2/16	29.00	2	0	
35	Zahid Hussain	2012	2012	3	3	2*	–	0	0	57	3	3/16	15.66	1	0	
36	Tyson Gordon	2012	2012	3	32	23	10.66	0	0	–	–	–	–	1	0	
37	Manny Aulakh	2012	2013	3	0	0	0.00	0	0	54	3	2/40	27.33	1	0	
38	Parth Desai	2012	2012	1	4	4*	–	0	0	18	1	1/30	30.00	0	0	
39	Hamza Tariq†	2013	2022	26	324	63*	29.45	3	0	–	–	–	–	16	6	
40	Damodar Daesrath	2013	2013	1	–	–	–	–	–	–	–	–	–	0	0	
41	Jeremy Gordon	2013	2024	17	4	2*	4.00	0	0	326	20	3/6	20.35	3	0	
42	Navneet Dhaliwal‡	2019	2026	49	1,305	70*	31.82	10	0	60	4	1/11	14.75	18	0	
43	Nikhil Dutta	2019	2024	25	80	27	26.66	0	0	475	25	4/12	21.08	6	0	
44	Romesh Eranga	2019	2019	9	1	1	1.00	0	0	191	12	3/19	17.00	2	0	
45	Dillon Heyliger	2019	2026	60	395	30	24.68	0	0	1,075	56	5/16	23.94	14	0	
46	Ravinderpal Singh	2019	2025	43	701	101	24.17	1	1	25	2	2/10	14.50	22	0	
47	Saad Bin Zafar‡	2019	2026	69	507	33*	25.35	0	0	1,398	76	3/8	18.84	24	0	
48	Rodrigo Thomas	2019	2019	8	73	18	10.42	0	0	–	–	–	–	2	0	
49	Abraash Khan	2019	2019	7	66	22	16.50	0	0	–	–	–	–	1	0	
50	Mark Montfort	2019	2019	1	1	1*	–	0	0	18	1	1/25	25.00	0	0	
51	Harsh Thaker	2019	2026	54	822	53*	25.68	2	0	760	39	4/20	19.82	14	0	
52	Nicholas Kirton‡	2019	2026	40	764	69*	23.87	2	0	54	4	1/3	24.25	16	0	
53	Srimantha Wijeyeratne†	2019	2024	17	261	56	21.75	3	0	–	–	–	–	11	4	
54	Jatinderpal Matharu	2021	2022	7	–	–	–	–	–	102	6	3/6	21.00	0	0	
55	Rayyan Pathan	2021	2024	14	477	107*	39.75	3	1	12	0	–	–	0	0	
56	Cecil Pervez	2021	2021	5	–	–	–	–	–	78	5	3/7	17.60	1	0	
57	Salman Nazar	2021	2022	8	10	10	10.00	0	0	168	14	3/8	12.35	5	0	
58	Rishiv Joshi	2021	2024	7	9	8	4.50	0	0	130	5	1/4	36.60	1	0	
59	Shreyas Movva†	2021	2026	28	378	37	21.00	0	0	–	–	–	–	21	4	
60	Kaleem Sana	2022	2026	45	51	13*	12.75	0	0	917	65	4/17	14.55	12	0	
61	Matthew Spoors	2022	2022	10	269	108*	38.42	1	1	12	1	1/5	5.00	2	0	
62	Ammar Khalid	2022	2022	7	–	–	–	–	–	156	12	4/17	14.50	0	0	
63	Aaron Johnson	2022	2025	31	910	121*	32.50	6	2	30	0	–	–	9	0	
64	Pargat Singh	2022	2025	25	432	89	20.57	3	0	54	3	2/25	29.33	2	0	
65	Armaan Kapoor	2022	2022	2	9	9*	–	0	0	–	–	–	–	1	0	
66	Dilpreet Bajwa	2023	2026	21	457	56	25.38	4	0	28	2	1/21	60.00	5	0	
67	Shahid Ahmadzai	2023	2025	2	–	–	–	–	–	12	1	1/27	27.00	0	0	
68	Uday Bhagwan	2024	2024	4	5	4	5.00	0	0	72	2	1/24	59.50	0	0	
69	Parveen Kumar	2024	2024	8	27	19	6.75	0	0	156	8	3/9	16.87	2	0	
70	Akhil Kumar	2024	2025	14	41	14*	13.66	0	0	196	10	3/12	25.00	4	0	
71	Kanwarpal Tathgur†	2024	2025	14	141	53*	15.66	1	0	–	–	–	–	13	5	
72	Ansh Patel	2024	2026	9	2	2*	–	0	0	138	8	3/31	17.37	0	0	
73	Yuvraj Samra	2025	2026	20	586	110	36.62	3	1	12	2	2/13	6.50	3	0	
74	Ajayveer Hundal	2025	2025	1	0	0	0.00	0	0	–	–	–	–	1	0	
75	Ali Nadeem	2025	2025	6	188	89	47.00	2	0	–	–	–	–	1	0	
76	Jaskaran Singh	2025	2026	16	120	60*	24.00	1	0	259	16	3/11	24.87	4	0	
77	Sukhjinder Singh	2025	2025	6	1	1*	–	0	0	78	2	2/3	34.50	3	0	
78	Mansab Gill	2025	2025	1	15	15	15.00	0	0	–	–	–	–	1	0	
79	Shivam Sharma	2025	2026	11	24	15	12.00	0	0	197	17	4/14	10.64	4	0	
80	Mihir Patel	2025	2025	1	2	2	2.00	0	0	–	–	–	–	0	0	

== See also ==
- Twenty20 International
- Canadian cricket team
- Canadian national cricket captains
- List of Canada ODI cricketers
