= Gregory Taylor (cricketer) =

Bahamian cricketer (born 1987)

Personal information
- Full name: Gregory Tyrone Taylor
- Born: 14 December 1987 (age 38)
- Batting: Left-handed
- Role: Wicket-keeper

International information
- National side: Bahamas
- T20I debut (cap 10): 7 November 2021 v Canada
- Last T20I: 22 June 2025 v Cayman Islands

Career statistics
Competition	T20I
Matches	25
Runs scored	282
Batting average	12.26
100s/50s	0/1
Top score	56*
Balls bowled	270
Wickets	13
Bowling average	25.53
5 wickets in innings	0
10 wickets in match	0
Best bowling	3/27
Catches/stumpings	10/–
- Source: Cricinfo, 29 September 2025

Gregory Tyrone Taylor (born 14 December 1987) is a Bahamian cricketer and the captain of the Bahamas national cricket team. Taylor is a left-handed batsman who also bowls as a left-arm bowler. Taylor also played as an occasional wicketkeeper.

== Biography ==
Taylor made his debut for the Bahamas in the 2004 Americas Affiliates Championship against the Turks and Caicos Islands.

Taylor made his Twenty20 debut for the Bahamas in the 1st round of the 2008 Stanford 20/20 against Jamaica, where he scored 10 runs and stumped Xavier Marshall off the bowling of Narendra Ekanayake.

Taylor represented the Bahamas in the 2008 ICC World Cricket League Division Five and in the 2010 ICC Americas Championship Division 2. He captained the side in the 2010 ICC World Cricket League Division Eight, gaining the man-of-the-match award in their win over Gibraltar. Taylor represented the Bahamas in the 2010 ICC Americas Championship Division 1.

In July 2019, he was named in the Bahamian squad for their tour of Bermuda.

In October 2021, Taylor was named as the captain of the Bahamas Twenty20 International (T20I) squad for the 2021 ICC Men's T20 World Cup Americas Qualifier tournament in Antigua. He made his T20I debut on 7 November 2021, for the Bahamas against Canada.
