= Marc Taylor =

Bahamian cricketer

Personal information
- Born: 20 March 1990 (age 36)
- Batting: Left-handed
- Bowling: Right-arm off break

International information
- National side: Bahamas
- T20I debut (cap 11): 7 November 2021 v Canada
- Last T20I: 22 June 2025 v Cayman

Career statistics
Competition	T20I
Matches	36
Runs scored	766
Batting average	21.88
100s/50s	0/5
Top score	71*
Balls bowled	556
Wickets	24
Bowling average	28.33
5 wickets in innings	0
10 wickets in match	0
Best bowling	3/17
Catches/stumpings	14/–
- Source: ESPNcricinfo, 29 September 2025

Marc Taylor (born 20 March 1990) is a Bahamian cricketer. Taylor is a left-handed batsman who currently represents the Bahamas national cricket team.

Taylor made his senior debut for the Bahamas against Jamaica in the 1st round of the 2008 Stanford 20/20. Taylor scored 4 runs before being run out by Carlton Baugh.

Taylor represented the Bahamas in the 2010 ICC Americas Championship Division 1 and 2010 ICC Americas Championship Division 2.

In July 2019, he was named in the Bahamian squad for their tour of Bermuda.

In October 2021, Taylor was named in the Bahamas Twenty20 International (T20I) squad for the 2021 ICC Men's T20 World Cup Americas Qualifier tournament in Antigua. He made his T20I debut on 7 November 2021, for the Bahamas against Canada.
