= Kanwarpal Tathgur =

Canadian cricketer (born 1993)

Personal information
- Born: 5 August 1993 (age 33)
- Batting: Right-handed
- Role: Batter

International information
- National side: Canada
- Only ODI (cap 105): 19 August 2024 v United States
- T20I debut (cap 71): 27 August 2024 v United States
- Last T20I: 22 June 2025 v Bermuda

Career statistics
Competition	LA	T20I
Matches	12	14
Runs scored	261	141
Batting average	26.10	15.66
100s/50s	0/1	0/1
Top score	53	53*
Catches/stumpings	7/–	13/5
- Source: Cricinfo, 27 August 2024

Kanwarpal Tathgur (born 5 August 1993) is a Canadian cricketer. In October 2019, he was named as the captain of Canada's squad for the 2019–20 Regional Super50 tournament in the West Indies. He made his List A debut on 8 November 2019, for Canada against the Leeward Islands, in the Regional Super50 tournament.

== International career ==
In November 2019, Kanwarpal debuted for Canada at the Group A at Basseterre, Super50, scoring 49 runs on debut against the Leeward Islands.

In May 2024, he was named in Canada’s squad for the 2024 ICC Men's T20 World Cup tournament.
