= Bahamas national cricket team =

The Bahamas
- Association: Bahamas Cricket Association

History
- Twenty20 debut: v Cayman Islands at Antigua; 11 July 2006

International Cricket Council
- ICC status: Associate member (2017)
- ICC region: Americas
ICC Rankings	Current	Best-ever
T20I	56th	51st (2-Apr-2025)

International cricket
- First international: v Turks and Caicos Islands at Jamaica; August 2001

T20 Internationals
- First T20I: v Canada at Sir Vivian Richards Stadium, Antigua; 7 November 2021
- Last T20I: v Bermuda at Jimmy Powell Oval, George Town; 26 September 2026
T20Is	Played	Won/Lost
Total	43	11/30 (0 ties, 2 no results)
This year	7	2/3 (0 ties, 2 no results)
T20I kit
- As of 26 September 2026

The Bahamas national cricket team represents The Bahamas in international cricket. The team is organised by the Bahamas Cricket Association (BCA), which became an affiliate member of the International Cricket Council (ICC) in 1987 and an associate member in 2017. The national team is first recorded as playing in 1983, but did not feature in an international tournament until 2001, when it played in the inaugural Americas Affiliates Championship. Since then, the Bahamas have regularly participated in ICC Americas tournaments, as well as on one occasion in a World Cricket League event (the 2010 Division Eight tournament). The team was also invited to the 2006 and 2008 Stanford 20/20 tournaments, where matches had full Twenty20 status.

In April 2018, the ICC decided to grant full Twenty20 International (T20I) status to all its members. Therefore, all Twenty20 matches played between the Bahamas and other ICC members after 1 January 2019 have the T20I status.

== History ==
The Bahamas became an affiliate member of the ICC in 1987, although they didn't appear in international competition until the ICC Americas Championship in 2002. They came fifth in that tournament, gaining a surprise win over hosts Argentina. They again played in the tournament in 2004, this time coming through a qualifying tournament. They finished last in the main tournament though, which meant they played in Division Two of the new divisional system in 2006. They finished second in that tournament, which wasn't good enough to qualify for Division One. They will remain in Division two in 2008.

In 2006, The Bahamas were one of the teams invited to take part in the Stanford 20/20. They got $100,000 for participating in the tournament, but were eliminated at the first hurdle by the Cayman Islands.

Bahamas played in the 2021 ICC Men's T20 World Cup Americas Qualifier, its first official ICC tournament in twelve years. Andy Moles was appointed as the team's head coach for the tournament. The Cricketer reported that the team went "without an international fixture for a staggering eight and a half years due to a combination of lack of funding and ICC cutbacks on tournaments at this level of associate cricket".

== Home stadium ==
The home stadium of the national team is the Haynes Oval in Nassau.

== Tournament history ==
=== T20 World Cup Americas Regional Final ===
ICC T20 World Cup Americas Regional Final (Note: Regional Final of the ICC Americas region is the final stage of qualification for T20 World Cup from 2023 edition.) records
Year	Round	Position	GP	W	L	T	NR
(Bermuda) 2019	Did not qualify						
(Antigua and Barbuda) 2021	Round-robin	5/7	6	2	4	0	0
(Bermuda) 2023	Did not qualify						
(Canada) 2025	Round-robin	4/4	6	0	6	0	0
Total	2/4	0 Titles	12	2	10	0	0

- A - Advanced to global qualifier
- Q - Qualified for T20 World Cup

=== North American Cup ===
2025 North American Cup records
Year	Round	Position	GP	W	L	T	NR
(Cayman Islands) 2025	Group Stage	5/5	4	0	4	0	0
Total	1/1	0 Title	4	0	4	0	0

=== Other tournaments ===
T20WC Americas Sub-regional Qualifiers	World Cricket League	ICC Americas Championship
2018: Did not participate; 2023: 5th place; 2024: 3rd place (Advanced to regional final)	2008 (Division five): 11th place – relegated; 2010 (Division eight): 8th place – relegated	2000: Did not participate; 2002: 5th place; 2004: 6th place; 2006: Runners-up; 2008: Runners-up; 2010: Winners

== Records ==
International Match Summary — Bahamas

Last updated 26 September 2026

Playing Record
Format	M	W	L	T	NR	Inaugural Match
Twenty20 Internationals	43	11	30	0	2	7 November 2021

=== Twenty20 International ===
T20I record versus other nations

Records complete to T20I #4149. Last updated 26 September 2026.

Opponent	M	W	L	T	NR	First match	First win
vs Associate Members
Argentina	3	2	1	0	0	8 November 2021	8 November 2021
Belize	3	3	0	0	0	11 November 2021	11 November 2021
Bermuda	9	0	8	0	1	10 November 2021	
Brazil	2	2	0	0	0	6 December 2024	6 December 2024
Canada	5	0	5	0	0	7 November 2021	
Cayman Islands	13	0	12	0	1	13 April 2022	
Mexico	1	1	0	0	0	16 December 2024	16 December 2024
Panama	4	2	2	0	0	13 November 2021	26 February 2023
Suriname	1	1	0	0	0	14 December 2024	14 December 2024
United States	2	0	2	0	0	13 November 2021	

== Current squad ==
Updated as on 15 June 2025

This lists all the active players who played for Bahamas in the recently concluded 2025 Men's T20 World Cup Americas Regional Final.

Name	Age	Batting style	Bowling style	Last T20I	Notes
Batters
Marc Taylor	36	Left-handed	Right-arm off break	(Cayman Islands) 2025	Captain
Eugene Duff	38	Right-handed	Right-arm medium	(Cayman Islands) 2025	
Javelle Gallimore	21	Left-handed	Right-arm medium	(Cayman Islands) 2025	
Everette Haven	51	Right-handed	—N/a	(Canada) 2025	
Ashok Nair	46	Right-handed	—N/a	(Cayman Islands) 2025	
Dwight Wheatley	29	Right-handed	—N/a	(Cayman Islands) 2025	
All-rounders
Jonathan Barry	38	Right-handed	Right-arm medium	(Cayman Islands) 2025	
Festus Benn	44	Right-handed	Right-arm off break	(Cayman Islands) 2025	
Shawn Fowler	38	Right-handed	Right-arm medium	(Cayman Islands) 2025	
Sandeep Goud	42	Left-handed	Left-arm medium-fast	(Canada) 2025	
Kervon Hinds	26	Left-handed	Slow left-arm orthodox	(Cayman Islands) 2025	
Dwight Weakley	56	Right-handed	Slow left-arm orthodox	(Cayman Islands) 2025	
Wicket-keeper
Julio Jemison	32	Right-handed	—N/a	(Cayman Islands) 2025	
Gregory Taylor	38	Left-handed	—N/a	(Cayman Islands) 2025	
Pace bowlers
Antonio Harris	22	Right-handed	—N/a	(Cayman Islands) 2025	
Spin bowlers
Akash Gulati	32	Right-handed	Right-arm legbreak	(Cayman Islands) 2025	
Keith Burrows	31	Right-handed	Unknown	(Bermuda) 2025	

== See also ==
- List of Bahamas Twenty20 International cricketers
