= 2026 Global T20 Canada =

Fifth edition of the Global T20 Canada

- Dates: 23 October – 2 November 2026
- Administrator: Cricket Canada
- Cricket format: Twenty20
- Tournament format(s): Round-robin tournament and Knockout
- Host: Saint Vincent and the Grenadines
- Champions: Toronto Kings
- Participants: 5
- Matches: 18
- Player of the series: Evin Lewis (Toronto Kings)
- Most runs: Andre Fletcher (Mississauga Skyhawks) (271)
- Most wickets: Shivam Sharma (Vancouver Guardians) (16)
- Official website: NCL GT20 Canada

The 2026 Global T20 Canada (or 2026 GT20 Canada) or for sponsorship reasons, also known as 2026 NCL Global T20 Canada (or 2026 NCL GT20 Canada), was the fifth edition of the Global T20 Canada, a Twenty20 professional cricket tournament played in Canada. This edition was held in Saint Vincent and the Grenadines rather than its usual home in Canada. The tournament ran from 23 October to 2 November 2026.

== Background ==
In December 2024, Cricket Canada announced the termination of their contract with Bombay Sports Limited. The rights to the GT20 were acquired by Dallas-based National Cricket League in April 2025.

In April 2025, Cricket Canada announced that they had awarded a long-term licensing deal to National Cricket League (NCL) Canada to operate the GT20 Canada tournament going forward. With the change in partner, Mayor Patrick Brown told CBC Toronto's Here and Now in July 2025 that Global T20 Canada would not take place that year, but that he hoped for the tournament to return in 2026.

In January 2026, it was announced that the tournament would return, being hosted in Toronto from July to August 2026.

In September 2026, it was announced that the 2026 edition would instead be staged in the Caribbean, with matches to be held in Saint Vincent and the Grenadines during the October–November window. The tournament was described as a one-season Caribbean edition intended to strengthen ties between Cricket Canada and Cricket West Indies (CWI) working within a collaborative governance and regulatory framework. CWI would also take a direct franchise investment in the competition. The tournament was scheduled to return to Canada for its 2027 edition.

== Teams ==
Teams	Captains	Head coaches
Brampton Blazers	Hamza Tariq	Ramesh Subasinghe
Mississauga Skyhawks	Unmukt Chand	Lance Klusener
Montreal Warriors	Will Bosisto	Amrinder Bhinder
Toronto Kings	Dwaine Pretorius	Rayad Emrit
Vancouver Guardians	Rony Talukdar	Pedro Collins

== Squads ==
Unlike previous editions, a player draft will not be held for the 2026 season. Instead, franchises are acquiring players through direct signings, with roster additions being announced progressively via the teams' official social media.

Brampton Blazers	Mississauga Skyhawks	Montreal Warriors	Toronto Kings	Vancouver Guardians
(Canada) Hamza Tariq (c/wk); (Canada) Fahad Ahmed; (England) Toby Albert; (India) K. S. Bharat (wk); (Cricket West Indies) Shadrack Descarte; (Italy) Thomas Draca; (Cricket West Indies) Dillon Douglas; (Canada) Ethan Gibson; (Cricket West Indies) Kofi James; (Canada) Farhan Malik; (Canada) Shreyas Movva (wk); (Cricket West Indies) Darren Nedd; (United States) Monank Patel (wk); (Cricket West Indies) Oshane Thomas; (Canada) Yuvraaj Samra; (Canada) Ravinder Singh; (Canada) Sandeep Singh; (Cricket West Indies) Chadwick Walton (wk)	(United States) Unmukt Chand (c/wk); (Cricket West Indies) Fabian Allen; (Canada) Parth Chaudhry; (Canada) Shubham Handa; (Oman) Khalid Kail; (Pakistan) Azam Khan (wk); (Canada) Jatinder Matharu; (England) Ali Orr; (South Africa) Wayne Parnell; (Canada) Rayyan Pathan; (Oman) Rafiullah; (India) Vijay Shankar; (Canada) Kairav Sharma; (Canada) Shivam Sharma Jr; (Canada) Zahid Shirzad; (Canada) Rohan Sikri; (Canada) Gurjot Singh Gosal; (Canada) Junaid Siddiqui; (Canada) Aaditya Varadharajan	(Australia) Will Bosisto (c); (Cricket West Indies) Kadeem Alleyne; (United States) Nauman Anwar; (Cricket West Indies) Zachary Carter; (Canada) Dilraj Deol; (India) Rishi Dhawan; (Cricket West Indies) Dominic Drakes; (Cricket West Indies) Andre Fletcher (wk); (Cricket West Indies) Nicholson Gordon; (Canada) Rajinder Kumar; (Canada) Sheel Patel; (United States) Kristopher Ramsaran; (United States) Ali Sheikh; (Canada) Aryan Sidhu; (Canada) Tajinder Singh Johal; (Canada) Sukhjinder Singh; (Canada) Harsh Thaker; (United States) Matthew Tromp	(South Africa) Dwaine Pretorius (c); (Pakistan) Mohammad Amir; (United States) Saif Badar; (Canada) Saad Bin Zafar; (Cricket West Indies) Dejourn Charles; (Cricket West Indies) Rahkeem Cornwall; (Cricket West Indies) Mark Deyal; (Canada) Anubhav Jawla; (Canada) Aaron Johnson; (United States) Ali Khan; (Canada) Akhil Kumar; (Cricket West Indies) Evin Lewis; (Canada) Ali Nadeem (wk); (United States) Obus Pienaar; (Canada) Kaleem Sana; (Canada) Gurnek Singh Johal; (Italy) JJ Smuts; (United States) Zia Shahzad; (Canada) Rahul Vashisht	(Bangladesh) Rony Talukdar (c); (England) Tom Abell; (Bangladesh) Shakib Al Hasan; (Canada) Uday Bhagwan; (Scotland) Brad Currie; (Bangladesh) Nasir Hossain; (Canada) Ajayveer Hundal; (South Africa) Colin Ingram; (Canada) Padam Joshi; (Cricket West Indies) Kennar Lewis; (England) Zen Malik; (Scotland) George Munsey; (Sri Lanka) Malinda Pushpakumara; (Canada) Salman Rana; (Cricket West Indies) Jayden Roberts; (Canada) Arun Nag Sai; (Canada) Pushpit Sharma; (Canada) Shivam Sharma; (Afghanistan) Hazratullah Zazai

== Venues ==
The 2026 edition of the tournament was relocated to Saint Vincent and the Grenadines, with all matches scheduled to be played at the Arnos Vale Stadium in Kingstown.

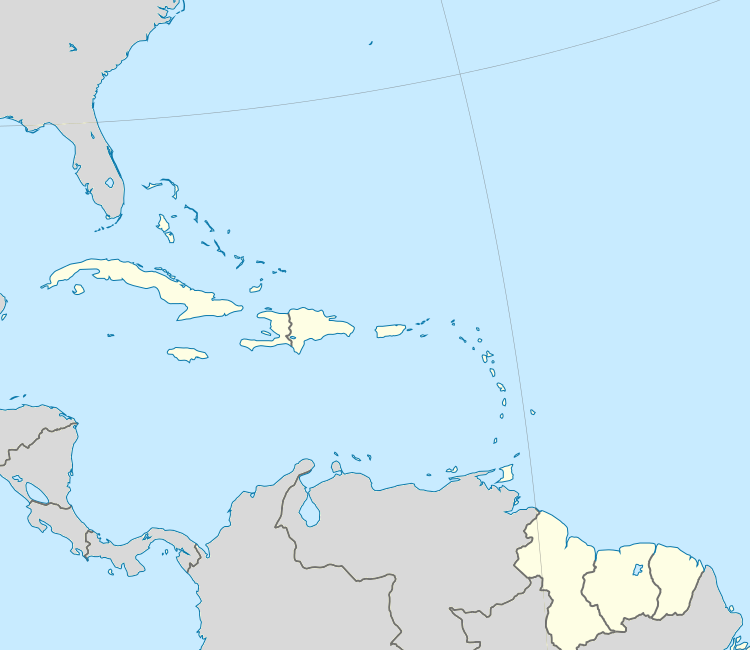
Venue of Global T20 Canada 2026
Saint Vincent and the Grenadines
Arnos Vale Stadium
Capacity: 18,000
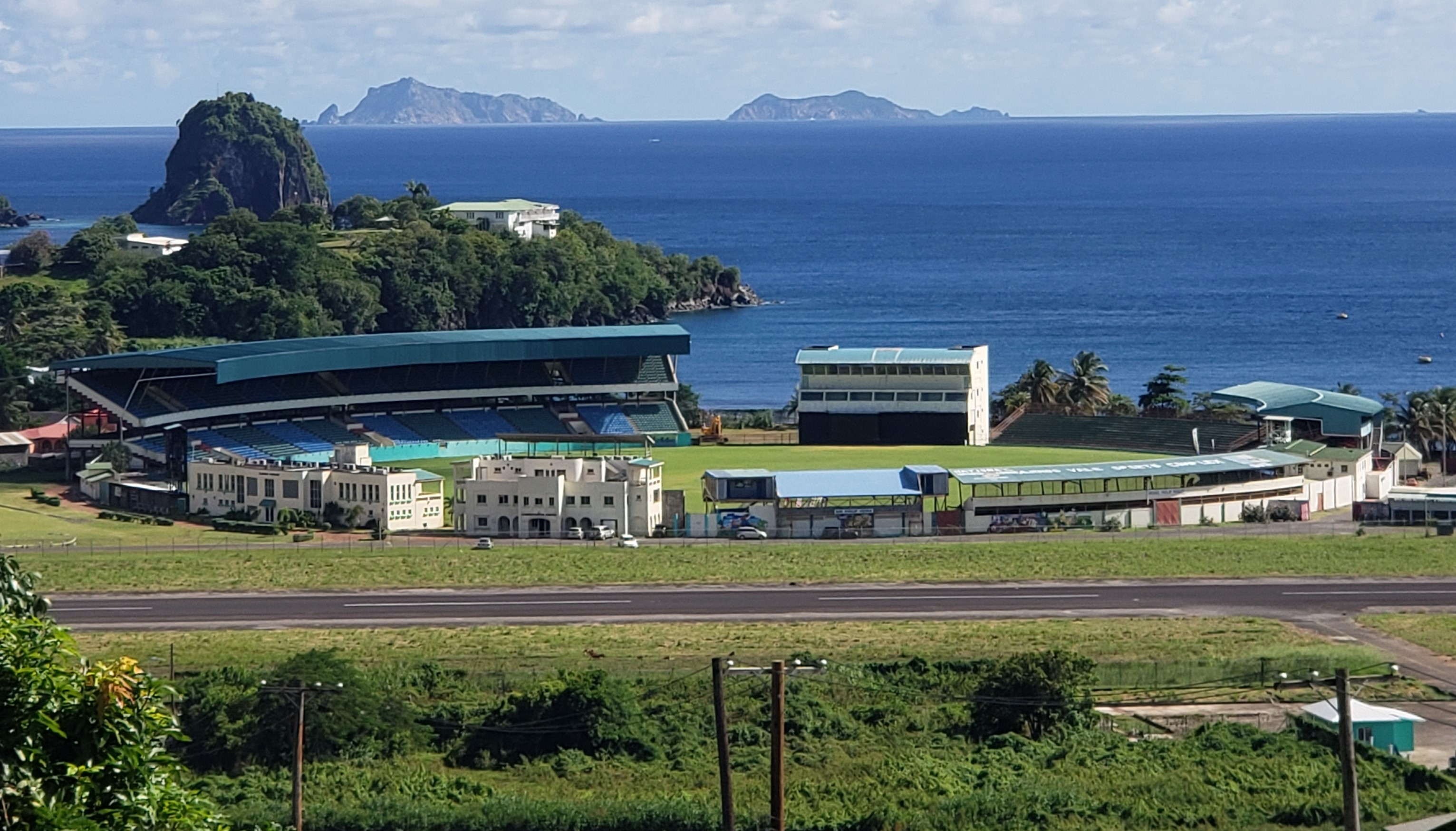

== Points table ==
Pos	Team	Pld	W	L	NR	Pts	NRR	Qualification
1	Toronto Kings (C)	6	4	2	0	8	0.794	Advanced to the knockout stage
2	Montreal Warriors (R)	6	3	2	1	7	1.634	Advanced to the knockout stage
3	Brampton Blazers	6	3	2	1	7	−0.680	Advanced to the knockout stage
4	Mississauga Skyhawks	6	2	4	0	4	−0.376	Advanced to the knockout stage
5	Vancouver Guardians	6	2	4	0	4	−1.206	Eliminated

Source: Cricinfo
(C) Champions; (R) Runners-up

=== Match summary ===
Team	Group matches						Play-offs	
Team	1	2	3	4	5	6	SF	F
Brampton Blazers	2	3	5	5	5	7	L	—
Mississauga Skyhawks	0	2	2	4	4	4	L	—
Montreal Warriors	2	3	3	5	5	7	W	N
Toronto Kings	0	2	4	4	6	8	W	N
Vancouver Guardians	0	0	2	2	4	4	—	—

Win	Loss	Tie	No result	Eliminated

- Note: The total points at the end of each group match are listed.
- Note: Click on the points or results to see the match summary.

== Fixtures ==
Match 1
23 October 2026
19:00 (N)
Scorecard

Toronto Kings; 153/6 (20 overs)	v	Brampton Blazers; 154/5 (19.1 overs)
Obus Pienaar 77* (41); Ethan Gibson 3/25 (4 overs)		Hamza Tariq 44 (32); Akhil Kumar 2/25 (3 overs)

Brampton Blazers won by 5 wickets
Arnos Vale Stadium, Kingstown
Umpires: Deighton Butler (WI) and Anil Chaudhary (Ind)
Player of the match: Hamza Tariq (Brampton Blazers)

- Brampton Blazers won the toss and elected to field.

Match 2
24 October 2026
10:00
Scorecard

Mississauga Skyhawks; 141/6 (20 overs)	v	Montreal Warriors; 146/2 (18 overs)
Unmukt Chand 59 (48); Kadeem Alleyne 4/17 (4 overs)		Andre Fletcher 97* (59); Fabian Allen 1/28 (4 overs)

Montreal Warriors won by 8 wickets
Arnos Vale Stadium, Kingstown
Umpires: Maria Abbott (WI) and Deighton Butler (WI)
Player of the match: Andre Fletcher (Montreal Warriors)

- Montreal Warriors won the toss and elected to field.

Match 3
24 October 2026
19:00 (N)
Scorecard

Toronto Kings; 196/7 (20 overs)	v	Vancouver Guardians; 112 (18.2 overs)
Rahkeem Cornwall 57 (29); Arun Nag Sai 2/41 (4 overs)		George Munsey 32 (35); JJ Smuts 4/30 (4 overs)

Toronto Kings won by 84 runs
Arnos Vale Stadium, Kingstown
Umpires: Anil Chaudhary (Ind) and Arnold Maddela (Can)
Player of the match: Evin Lewis (Toronto Kings)

- Vancouver Guardians won the toss and elected to field.

Match 4
25 October 2026
10:00
Scorecard

Vancouver Guardians; 169/4 (20 overs)	v	Mississauga Skyhawks; 170/6 (19.4 overs)
Colin Ingram 56* (35); Rafiullah 2/25 (2 overs)		Unmukt Chand 64* (52); Shivam Sharma 2/14 (4 overs)

Mississauga Skyhawks won by 4 wickets
Arnos Vale Stadium, Kingstown
Umpires: Anil Chaudhary (Ind) and Arnold Maddela (Can)
Player of the match: Unmukt Chand (Mississauga Skyhawks)

- Mississauga Skyhawks won the toss and elected to field.

Match 5
25 October 2026
19:00 (N)
Scorecard

Brampton Blazers; 76/3 (9 overs)	v	Montreal Warriors
Monank Patel 45* (30); Dominic Drakes 2/9 (2 overs)

No result
Arnos Vale Stadium, Kingstown
Umpires: Anil Chaudhary (Ind) and Arnold Maddela (Can)

- Montreal Warriors won the toss and elected to field.
- The match was reduced to 15 overs per side due to rain.
- No further play was possible due to rain.

Match 6
26 October 2026
10:00
Scorecard

Montreal Warriors; 107/9 (20 overs)	v	Toronto Kings; 111/5 (18.4 overs)
Andre Fletcher 31 (29); Saad Bin Zafar 2/9 (4 overs)		Obus Pienaar 36* (33); Zachary Carter 1/4 (1 over)

Toronto Kings won by 5 wickets
Arnos Vale Stadium, Kingstown
Umpires: Maria Abbott (WI) and Anil Chaudhary (Ind)
Player of the match: Saad Bin Zafar (Toronto Kings)

- Toronto Kings won the toss and elected to field.

Match 7
26 October 2026
15:00 (D/N)
Scorecard

Mississauga Skyhawks; 147 (19.4 overs)	v	Brampton Blazers; 149/5 (16.2 overs)
Fabian Allen 47 (29); Sandeep Singh 3/19 (4 overs)		Toby Albert 53 (28); Zahid Shirzad 2/31 (3 overs)

Brampton Blazers won by 5 wickets
Arnos Vale Stadium, Kingstown
Umpires: Deighton Butler (WI) and Arnold Maddela (Can)
Player of the match: Toby Albert (Brampton Blazers)

- Brampton Blazers won the toss and elected to field.

Match 8
28 October 2026
10:00
Scorecard

Vancouver Guardians; 177/7 (20 overs)	v	Brampton Blazers; 81 (12.1 overs)
Colin Ingram 50 (29); Ethan Gibson 2/24 (3 overs)		Dillon Douglas 39 (18); Malinda Pushpakumara 4/1 (2.1 overs)

Vancouver Guardians won by 96 runs
Arnos Vale Stadium, Kingstown
Umpires: Deighton Butler (WI) and Arnold Maddela (Can)
Player of the match: Malinda Pushpakumara (Vancouver Guardians)

- Brampton Blazers won the toss and elected to field.

Match 9
28 October 2026
19:00 (N)
Scorecard

Mississauga Skyhawks; 153/5 (20 overs)	v	Toronto Kings; 111 (19.3 overs)
Rayyan Pathan 53 (43); Akhil Kumar 3/28 (4 overs)		JJ Smuts 31 (26); Fabian Allen 4/14 (4 overs)

Mississauga Skyhawks won by 42 runs
Arnos Vale Stadium, Kingstown
Umpires: Deighton Butler (WI) and Anil Chaudhary (Ind)
Player of the match: Fabian Allen (Mississauga Skyhawks)

- Toronto Kings won the toss and elected to field.

Match 10
29 October 2026
10:00
Scorecard

Montreal Warriors; 185/3 (20 overs)	v	Vancouver Guardians; 90/9 (20 overs)
Andre Fletcher 86 (61); Shivam Sharma 1/10 (3 overs)		Hazratullah Zazai 20 (19); Sukhjinder Singh 3/10 (4 overs)

Montreal Warriors won by 95 runs
Arnos Vale Stadium, Kingstown
Umpires: Maria Abbott (WI) and Deighton Butler (WI)
Player of the match: William Bosisto (Montreal Warriors)

- Vancouver Guardians won the toss and elected to field.

Match 11
29 October 2026
19:00 (N)
Scorecard

Toronto Kings; 191 (20 overs)	v	Mississauga Skyhawks; 158/8 (20 overs)
Evin Lewis 42 (24); Zahid Shirzad 3/29 (4 overs)		Vijay Shankar 35 (30); Saad Bin Zafar 2/24 (4 overs)

Toronto Kings won by 33 runs
Arnos Vale Stadium, Kingstown
Umpires: Anil Chaudhary (Ind) and Arnold Maddela (Can)
Player of the match: Saad Bin Zafar (Toronto Kings)

- Mississauga Skyhawks won the toss and elected to field.

Match 12
30 October 2026
10:00
Scorecard

Vancouver Guardians; 199/6 (20 overs)	v	Brampton Blazers; 186/9 (20 overs)
Hazratullah Zazai 83* (54); Thomas Draca 2/37 (4 overs)		Monank Patel 81 (46); Shivam Sharma 6/28 (4 overs)

Vancouver Guardians won by 13 runs
Arnos Vale Stadium, Kingstown
Umpires: Maria Abbott (WI) and Deighton Butler (WI)
Player of the match: Shivam Sharma (Vancouver Guardians)

- Brampton Blazers won the toss and elected to field.
- Shivam Sharma (Vancouver Guardians) became the first bowler in the history of GT20 to take a double hat-trick and a six-wicket haul in T20s.

Match 13
30 October 2026
19:00 (N)
Scorecard

Montreal Warriors; 121/9 (20 overs)	v	Toronto Kings; 124/5 (18.5 overs)
Ali Sheikh 30 (18); Zia Shahzad 4/15 (4 overs)		Saif Badar 44 (38); Ali Sheikh 2/16 (3 overs)

Toronto Kings won by 5 wickets
Arnos Vale Stadium, Kingstown
Umpires: Anil Chaudhary (Ind) and Arnold Maddela (Can)
Player of the match: Zia Shahzad (Toronto Kings)

- Toronto Kings won the toss and elected to field.

Match 14
31 October 2026
10:00
Scorecard

Montreal Warriors; 171/8 (20 overs)	v	Vancouver Guardians; 101 (18.4 overs)
Andre Fletcher 45 (27); Shivam Sharma 3/14 (4 overs)		Hazratullah Zazai 31 (29); Sukhjinder Singh 4/16 (4 overs)

Montreal Warriors won by 70 runs
Arnos Vale Stadium, Kingstown
Umpires: Deighton Butler (WI) and Arnold Maddela (Can)
Player of the match: Ali Sheikh (Montreal Warriors)

- Montreal Warriors won the toss and elected to bat.

Match 15
31 October 2026
19:00 (N)
Scorecard

Mississauga Skyhawks; 142/6 (19 overs)	v	Brampton Blazers; 144/4 (18.4 overs)
Vijay Shankar 36* (19); Sandeep Singh 2/22 (3 overs)		Yuvraj Samra 45 (42); Kairav Sharma 1/17 (4 overs)

Brampton Blazers won by 6 wickets
Arnos Vale Stadium, Kingstown
Umpires: Anil Chaudhary (Ind) and Arnold Maddela (Can)
Player of the match: Toby Albert (Brampton Blazers)

- Brampton Blazers won the toss and elected to field.
- The match was reduced to 19 overs per side due to rain.

== Knockout stage ==
=== Bracket ===
Semi-finals
1	Toronto Kings	162/1 (16 overs)
4	Mississauga Skyhawks	161/5 (20 overs)
2	Montreal Warriors	120/7 (19.2 overs)
3	Brampton Blazers	119 (19.5 overs)

Final
SF1W	Toronto Kings	Abandoned
SF2W	Montreal Warriors	Abandoned

=== Semi-finals ===
Semi-final 1
1 November 2026
10:00
Scorecard

Mississauga Skyhawks; 161/5 (20 overs)	v	Toronto Kings; 162/1 (16 overs)
Unmukt Chand 41 (37); Zia Shahzad 1/12 (1 over)		Evin Lewis 101* (53); Wayne Parnell 1/16 (1 over)

Toronto Kings won by 9 wickets
Arnos Vale Stadium, Kingstown
Umpires: Deighton Butler (WI) and Anil Chaudhary (Ind)
Player of the match: Evin Lewis (Toronto Kings)

- Mississauga Skyhawks won the toss and elected to bat.

Semi-final 2
1 November 2026
19:00 (N)
Scorecard

Brampton Blazers; 119 (19.5 overs)	v	Montreal Warriors; 120/7 (19.2 overs)
Toby Albert 48 (37); Sukhjinder Singh 3/10 (4 overs)		Will Bosisto 21 (18); Ethan Gibson 2/23 (4 overs)

Montreal Warriors won by 3 wickets
Arnos Vale Stadium, Kingstown
Umpires: Deighton Butler (WI) and Arnold Maddela (Can)
Player of the match: Sukhjinder Singh (Montreal Warriors)

- Montreal Warriors won the toss and elected to field.

=== Final ===
The Final
2 November 2026
19:00 (N)
Scorecard

Toronto Kings	v	Montreal Warriors

Match abandoned
Arnos Vale Stadium, Kingstown
Umpires: Deighton Butler (WI) and Anil Chaudhary (Ind)

- No toss.
- No play was possible due to rain.
- Toronto Kings won the tournament due to being table topper.

== Statistics ==
- Although matches are being played using standard Twenty20 formats, players' statistics aren't included in their official records because Cricket Canada is not a full-member of the International Cricket Council

=== Most runs ===
Player	Team	Innings	Runs	High score
Andre Fletcher	Mississauga Skyhawks	7	271	97*
Unmukt Chand	Mississauga Skyhawks	7	227	64*
Evin Lewis	Toronto Kings	4	205	101*
Monank Patel	Brampton Blazers	6	186	81
Toby Albert	Brampton Blazers	7	166	53

- Source ESPNcricinfo

=== Most wickets ===
Player	Team	Matches	Wickets	Best bowling
Shivam Sharma	Vancouver Guardians	5	16	6/28
Sukhjinder Singh	Montreal Warriors	6	12	4/16
JJ Smuts	Toronto Kings	7	11	4/30
Saad Bin Zafar	Toronto Kings	7	10	3/7
Fabian Allen	Mississauga Skyhawks	7	10	4/14

- Source: ESPNcricinfo

== Broadcasting ==
The competition is being broadcast on the following television and streaming services:

Location	Television broadcaster(s)	Streaming
Canada	ATN cricket plus	CBC Gem
Afghanistan	Solh Sports	
Africa	Sports Connect	Africa XP
Australia; New Zealand	Sports Connect	
Bangladesh	T Sports	MyCo
Caribbean	Rush: Live & Louder	Rush: Live & Louder
Europe	Sports Connect	ARY Plus
India	Unite8 Sports	ZEE5
MENA	Dubai Sports	MyCo
Latin America	Rush: Live & Louder	Rush: Live & Louder
Nepal	Action Sports	
Pakistan	Geo Super	Tamasha; MyCo
Sri Lanka	Dialog TV	SLTMobitel
United Kingdom	A Sports	ARY Plus
United States		ARY Plus
