= Subasinghe =

Subasinghe is a Sri-Lankan name. It may refer to:

- Dinesh Subasinghe (born 1979), Sri Lankan composer, violinist and music producer
- Ramesh Subasinghe (born 1983), Sri Lankan cricketer
- S. K. Subasinghe, Sri Lankan politician and member of the Parliament
- Somalatha Subasinghe (1936–2015), Sri Lankan actress, playwright, theatre director and educator
- Tikiri Banda Subasinghe (1913–1995), Sri Lankan statesman and Speaker of the Parliament of Sri Lanka
