= Lawrence Einhorn =

American oncologist

- Education: Indiana University Bloomington; University of Iowa; University of Texas MD Anderson Cancer Center
- Scientific career
- Workplaces: Indiana University School of Medicine

Lawrence Einhorn is an American oncologist at Indiana University School of Medicine. A pioneer in cancer treatment research, Einhorn developed cisplatin-based chemotherapy regimens that drastically increased cure rates while minimizing toxic side effects.

== Overview ==
Einhorn received a B.S. from Indiana University Bloomington in 1965 and his M.D. from the University of Iowa in 1968. He served his internship and residency at Indiana University Medical Center, followed by a fellowship in Hematology/Oncology at the M.D. Anderson Hospital Tumor Institute in Houston, Texas. He returned to IU Medical Center in 1973 and was named Distinguished Professor of Medicine in 1987. He became the first Lance Armstrong Foundation Professor of Oncology in 2006. Einhorn is also a member of the Experimental and Developmental Therapeutics Program at the Indiana University Melvin and Bren Simon Comprehensive Cancer Center in Indianapolis.

Einhorn has received numerous honors in his career including the Glenn Irwin Experience Excellence Award, Riley Distinguished Lecturer, the Kettering Prize Cancer Research-General Motors Foundation, the ACCC Clinical Oncology Award, the Distinguished Clinician Award from the Milken Foundation, the Willis Stetson Award and Lecture from The University of Pennsylvania, the Richard and Hinda Rosenthal Foundation Award for Cancer Research, the Herman B Wells Visionary Award, the State of Israel Peace Medal, the Vermeil Medal of Paris, and The David A. Kamofsky Memorial Award and Lecture from the American Society of Clinical Oncology. He was elected to membership in the National Academy of Sciences and American Philosophical Society in 2001.

== Famous patients ==
- Lance Armstrong – American cyclist. In 1996, Armstrong was battling stage-three testicular cancer that had spread to his brain, lungs, and abdomen. Einhorn led the medical team that treated Armstrong's cancer. By February 1997, Armstrong was declared cancer-free. The same year, he founded the Livestrong Foundation, formerly known as the Lance Armstrong Foundation, to support cancer patients.
- Yuvraj Singh – Indian cricket player, discovered cancer in his lungs during the 2011 Cricket World Cup. Singh was successfully treated for a mediastinal germ cell tumor (mediastinal seminoma). Returning to cricket after one year, Singh founded the YouWeCan Foundation which helped hundreds of cancer patients.

== Authored works ==
- Einhorn, LH (2002). "Curing metastatic testicular cancer". Proc Natl Acad Sci U S A. 99 (7): 4592–5. doi:10.1073/pnas.072067999. PMC 123692. PMID 11904381.
- Einhorn, LH; Williams, SD (1980). "Chemotherapy of disseminated seminoma". Cancer Clin Trials. 3 (4): 307–13. PMID 6159120.
