= Roddy Estwick =

West Indian cricketer (born 1961)

Personal information
- Full name: Roderick Orville Estwick
- Born: 28 June 1961 (age 65); Christ Church, Barbados
- Batting: Right-handed
- Bowling: Right-arm fast-medium
- Relatives: Sylvester Clarke (half-brother)

Career statistics
Competition	First-class	List A
Matches	37	42
Runs scored	376	100
Batting average	10.16	5.88
100s/50s	0/0	0/0
Top score	43*	30
Balls bowled	6,203	2,266
Wickets	141	43
Bowling average	21.90	32.37
5 wickets in innings	6	0
10 wickets in match	0	0
Best bowling	6/68	4/23
Catches/stumpings	16/–	11/–
- Source: CricketArchive, 6 December 2022

Roderick Orville Estwick (born June 28, 1961) is a former Barbadian first-class cricketer. He is the half-brother of West Indian cricketer Sylvester Clarke. He is the current bowling consultant of Nepal national cricket team.

== Cricket career ==
A fast bowler, he played for Barbados from 1982–83 to 1986–87, toured Zimbabwe with a Young West Indies team in 1983–84, and played for Transvaal from 1987–88 to 1989–90. He won the South African Cricket Annual Cricketer of the Year award in 1988 after taking 36 wickets at 16.41 in his first season in South Africa, including 4 for 47 and 4 for 63 to help Transvaal defeat Orange Free State in the final of the Castle Currie Cup. Earlier in the season he had taken 4 for 45 and 5 for 17 against Orange Free State.

His best first-class bowling figures were 6 for 68 against Leeward Islands in 1983–84. His highest score was 43 not out in the 1987–88 Castle Currie Cup final, when, batting at number 11, he added 74 for the tenth wicket with Ray Jennings.

He played as the professional for Todmorden in the Lancashire League from 1982 to 1984.

== Coaching career ==
He is currently Bowling Coach of Nepal Men's senior cricket team.In April 2024, he was appointed as Bowling Coach of Nepal. Previously he was one of the Assistant Coaches to the Regional West Indies Senior Team. In June 2018, he was named as one of the two team coaches of the Cricket West Indies Team squad for the inaugural edition of the Global T20 Canada tournament.

In April 2024, he was appointed as the bowling consultant of Nepal national cricket team.
