= 2018 Global T20 Canada =

Inaugural edition of the Global T20 Canada

- Dates: 28 June – 15 July 2018
- Administrator: Cricket Canada
- Cricket format: Twenty20
- Tournament format(s): Round-robin and playoffs
- Champions: Vancouver Knights (1st title)
- Participants: 6
- Matches: 22
- Player of the series: Lendl Simmons (Winnipeg Hawks)
- Most runs: Lendl Simmons (Winnipeg Hawks) (321)
- Most wickets: Sheldon Cottrell (Vancouver Knights) (16)
- Official website: www.gt20.ca

The 2018 Global T20 Canada (also known as Canada Dry Global T20 Canada for sponsorship reasons) of the Global T20 Canada, was a professional Twenty20 cricket tournament that was played in Canada. It was the first edition of the tournament and ran from 28 June to 15 July 2018. Six teams took part, with all the matches played at the Maple Leaf Cricket Club in King City, Ontario.

A player draft took place on 3 June 2018. Approximately 1,600 players registered for the draft, with 600 of those from Canada. Ahead of the draft, the following ten international cricketers were named as marquee players: Shahid Afridi, Dwayne Bravo, Chris Gayle, Chris Lynn, Lasith Malinga, David Miller, Sunil Narine, Andre Russell, Darren Sammy and Steve Smith. Smith played in the opening match of the tournament and Warner played in the second match of the tournament, both played their first representative matches since being found guilty of ball-tampering during the third Test match between South Africa and Australia in March 2018, and handed 12-month suspension "from all international and domestic cricket" although they were "permitted to play club cricket" during the suspension period.

In the final, Vancouver Knights defeated West Indies B by seven wickets to win the tournament.

== Teams and squads ==
The following teams, squads and coaches were announced for the tournament:

=== Teams ===
Teams	Captains	Head Coach
Edmonton Royals	Sohail Tanvir	Mohammad Akram
Montreal Tigers	Lasith Malinga	Tom Moody
Toronto Nationals	Daren Sammy	Phil Simmons
Vancouver Knights	Chris Gayle	Donovan Miller
West Indies B	Anthony Bramble	Stuart Williams; Roddy Estwick
Winnipeg Hawks	David Warner	Waqar Younis

=== Squads ===
Edmonton Royals	Montreal Tigers	Toronto Nationals	Vancouver Knights	West Indies B	Winnipeg Hawks
Sohail Tanvir (c); Shahid Afridi; Umar Akmal; Asif Ali; Shaiman Anwar; Farhaan Behardien; Satsimranjit Dhindsa; Andre Fletcher; Mohammad Irfan; Christiaan Jonker; Ammar Khalid; Abraash Khan; Hassan Khan; Chris Lynn; Kevin O'Brien; Wayne Parnell; Simon Pervez; Ahmed Raza; Luke Ronchi; Agha Salman	Lasith Malinga (c); Kevon Cooper; Mohammad Hafeez; Moises Henriques; Dillon Heyliger; Ibrahim Khaleel; Nicholas Kirton; Sandeep Lamichhane; Sunil Narine; Ashley Nurse; Rayyan Pathan; Thisara Perera; Cecil Pervez; Denesh Ramdin; Sikandar Raza; Dasun Shanaka; Peter Siddle; Dwayne Smith; Isuru Udana; George Worker; Najibullah Zadran	Daren Sammy (c); Kamran Akmal; Johnson Charles; Anton Devcich; Navneet Dhaliwal; Nikhil Dutta; Umair Ghani; Nizakat Khan; Nitish Kumar; Farhan Malik; Usama Mir; Rohan Mustafa; Mohammad Naveed; Kieron Pollard; Rumman Raees; Mohammad Sami; Steve Smith; Hussain Talat; Kesrick Williams	Chris Gayle (c); Fawad Ahmed; Saad Bin Zafar; Sheldon Cottrell; Ben Dunk; Jeremy Gordon; Ruvindu Gunasekera; Babar Hayat; Steven Jacobs; Kamau Leverock; Evin Lewis; Salman Nazar; Andre Russell; Tim Southee; Rassie van der Dussen; Chadwick Walton; Srimantha Wijeratne	Anthony Bramble (c); Fabian Allen; Alick Athanaze; Roland Cato; Justin Greaves; Derval Green; Kavem Hodge; Brandon King; Jeremiah Louis; Obed McCoy; Khary Pierre; Nicholas Pooran; Sherfane Rutherford; Shamar Springer	David Warner (c); Darren Bravo; Dwayne Bravo; Rizwan Cheema; Mark Deyal; Fidel Edwards; Rayad Emrit; Ali Khan; Ben McDermott; David Miller; Hiral Patel; Kyle Phillip; Junaid Siddiqui; Lendl Simmons; Hamza Tariq; Tion Webster

== Points table ==
Pos	Team	Pld	W	L	T	NR	Pts	NRR
1	Vancouver Knights	6	4	1	0	1	9	+1.417
2	West Indies B	6	4	2	0	0	8	+0.403
3	Winnipeg Hawks	6	3	3	0	0	6	+0.630
4	Edmonton Royals	6	2	3	0	1	5	–0.091
5	Montreal Tigers	6	2	4	0	0	4	–0.322
6	Toronto Nationals	6	2	4	0	0	4	–1.897

- The top four teams qualified for the playoffs
- Advanced to Playoff 1
- Advanced to Playoff 2

== League stage ==
The full fixtures were confirmed on 13 June 2018. The first round took place from 28 June to 7 July, the second round took place from 8 to 11 July and playoffs from 12 to 15 July 2018. Times shown were Eastern DST.

=== Round 1 ===
28 June 2018
16:00 (D/N)
Scorecard

Vancouver Knights; 227/4 (20 overs)	v	Toronto Nationals; 231/4 (19.2 overs)
Evin Lewis 96 (55); Nikhil Dutta 2/26 (4 overs)		Anton Devcich 92* (44); Saad Bin Zafar 1/25 (2 overs)

Toronto Nationals won by 6 wickets
Maple Leaf Cricket Club, King City, Ontario
Umpires: Roger Dill (Ber) and Patrick Gustard (WI)
Player of the match: Anton Devcich (Toronto Nationals)

- Toronto Nationals won the toss and elected to field.

29 June 2018
16:00 (D/N)
Scorecard

Winnipeg Hawks; 203/4 (20 overs)	v	Montreal Tigers; 157 (18.5 overs)
Ben McDermott 68 (46); Lasith Malinga 2/19 (4 overs)		Sikandar Raza 30 (13); Dwayne Bravo 3/24 (4 overs)

Winnipeg Hawks won by 46 runs
Maple Leaf Cricket Club, King City, Ontario
Umpires: Arnold Maddela (Can) and Leslie Reifer (WI)
Player of the match: Ben McDermott (Winnipeg Hawks)

- Montreal Tigers won the toss and elected to field.

30 June 2018
12:00
Scorecard

Toronto Nationals; 169/7 (20 overs)	v	Edmonton Royals; 173/2 (15 overs)
Nitish Kumar 55 (37); Wayne Parnell 2/24 (3 overs)		Andre Fletcher 68* (39); Kieron Pollard 1/18 (2 overs)

Edmonton Royals won by 8 wickets
Maple Leaf Cricket Club, King City, Ontario
Umpires: Nigel Duguid (WI) and Harry Grewal (Can)
Player of the match: Andre Fletcher (Edmonton Royals)

- Edmonton Royals won the toss and elected to field.

30 June 2018
16:00 (D/N)
Scorecard

Montreal Tigers; 184/9 (20 overs)	v	Cricket West Indies B Team; 187/8 (19.1 overs)
Sikandar Raza 48 (37); Obed McCoy 3/31 (4 overs)		Nicholas Pooran 58 (35); Lasith Malinga 2/32 (4 overs)

Cricket West Indies B Team won by 2 wickets
Maple Leaf Cricket Club, King City, Ontario
Umpires: Arnold Maddela (Can) and Leslie Reifer (WI)
Player of the match: Nicholas Pooran (Cricket West Indies B Team)

- Montreal Tigers won the toss and elected to bat.

1 July 2018
11:00
Scorecard

Winnipeg Hawks; 156/9 (20 overs)	v	Vancouver Knights; 162/4 (17.4 overs)
Tion Webster 49* (34); Sheldon Cottrell 3/28 (4 overs)		Babar Hayat 65 (33); Ali Khan 2/25 (3 overs)

Vancouver Knights won by 6 wickets
Maple Leaf Cricket Club, King City, Ontario
Umpires: Roger Dill (Ber) and Nigel Duguid (WI)
Player of the match: Babar Hayat (Vancouver Knights)

- Vancouver Knights won the toss and elected to field.

1 July 2018
16:00 (D/N)
Scorecard

Edmonton Royals; 155 (19.4 overs)	v	Cricket West Indies B Team; 159/7 (18 overs)
Kevin O'Brien 49 (17); Obed McCoy 4/22 (3.4 overs)		Fabian Allen 75* (30); Hassan Khan 3/46 (4 overs)

Cricket West Indies B Team won by 3 wickets
Maple Leaf Cricket Club, King City, Ontario
Umpires: Patrick Gustard (WI) and Vishal Sudhalkar (Can)
Player of the match: Fabian Allen (Cricket West Indies B Team)

- Cricket West Indies B Team won the toss and elected to field.

2 July 2018
11:00
Scorecard

Winnipeg Hawks; 164/6 (20 overs)	v	Toronto Nationals; 108 (17.2 overs)
Lendl Simmons 44 (34); Mohammad Naveed 2/29 (4 overs)		Anton Devcich 34 (19); Tion Webster 4/22 (2.2 overs)

Winnipeg Hawks won by 56 runs
Maple Leaf Cricket Club, King City, Ontario
Umpires: Bijal Patel (Can) and Leslie Reifer (WI)
Player of the match: Fidel Edwards (Winnipeg Hawks)

- Toronto Nationals won the toss and elected to field.

2 July 2018
16:00 (D/N)
Scorecard

Vancouver Knights; 166/6 (20 overs)	v	Montreal Tigers; 148 (19.4 overs)
Rassie van der Dussen 83* (56); Lasith Malinga 3/41 (4 overs)		George Worker 43 (33); Tim Southee 3/20 (4 overs)

Vancouver Knights won by 18 runs
Maple Leaf Cricket Club, King City, Ontario
Umpires: Roger Dill (Ber) and Nigel Duguid (WI)
Player of the match: Rassie van der Dussen (Vancouver Knights)

- Montreal Tigers won the toss and elected to field.

4 July 2018
11:00
Scorecard

Montreal Tigers; 129/6 (20 overs)	v	Edmonton Royals; 114 (19.1 overs)
Moises Henriques 50 (49); Wayne Parnell 3/23 (4 overs)		Luke Ronchi 30 (19); Peter Siddle 4/13 (3.1 overs)

Montreal Tigers won by 15 runs
Maple Leaf Cricket Club, King City, Ontario
Umpires: Leslie Reifer (WI) and Vishal Sudhalkar (Can)
Player of the match: Peter Siddle (Montreal Tigers)

- Edmonton Royals won the toss and elected to field.

5 July 2018
11:00
Scorecard

Winnipeg Hawks; 151/8 (20 overs)	v	Cricket West Indies B Team; 155/1 (17.5 overs)
Lendl Simmons 45 (40); Obed McCoy 3/39 (4 overs)		Justin Greaves 89* (58); Fidel Edwards 1/17 (4 overs)

Cricket West Indies B Team won by 9 wickets
Maple Leaf Cricket Club, King City, Ontario
Umpires: Patrick Gustard (WI) and Arnold Maddela (Can)
Player of the match: Justin Greaves (Cricket West Indies B Team)

- Cricket West Indies B Team won the toss and elected to field.

6 July 2018
11:00
Scorecard

Vancouver Knights	v	Edmonton Royals

Match abandoned
Maple Leaf Cricket Club, King City, Ontario
Umpires: Roger Dill (Ber) and Nigel Duguid (WI)

- No toss.
- No play was possible due to a wet outfield.

7 July 2018
11:00
Scorecard

Toronto Nationals; 128/5 (20 overs)	v	Cricket West Indies B Team; 131/2 (14.1 overs)
Steve Smith 55* (43); Justin Greaves 2/20 (4 overs)		Justin Greaves 45 (33); Usama Mir 1/29 (4 overs)

Cricket West Indies B Team won by 8 wickets
Maple Leaf Cricket Club, King City, Ontario
Umpires: Bijal Patel (Can) and Leslie Reifer (WI)
Player of the match: Justin Greaves (Cricket West Indies B Team)

- Cricket West Indies B Team won the toss and elected to field.

7 July 2018
16:00 (D/N)
Scorecard

Winnipeg Hawks; 203/5 (20 overs)	v	Edmonton Royals; 209/5 (19.3 overs)
Lendl Simmons 66 (48); Mohammad Irfan 2/29 (4 overs)		Agha Salman 73 (41); Fidel Edwards 2/33 (4 overs)

Edmonton Royals won by 5 wickets
Maple Leaf Cricket Club, King City, Ontario
Umpires: Nigel Duguid (WI) and Vishal Sudhalkar (Can)
Player of the match: Agha Salman (Edmonton Royals)

- Edmonton Royals won the toss and elected to field.

8 July 2018
11:00
Scorecard

Vancouver Knights; 175/4 (20 overs)	v	Cricket West Indies B Team; 140 (19.3 overs)
Chris Gayle 63 (55); Derval Green 3/33 (4 overs)		Kavem Hodge 43 (39); Sheldon Cottrell 4/19 (4 overs)

Vancouver Knights won by 35 runs
Maple Leaf Cricket Club, King City, Ontario
Umpires: Nigel Duguid (WI) and Arnold Maddela (Can)
Player of the match: Sheldon Cottrell (Vancouver Knights)

- Cricket West Indies B Team won the toss and elected to field.

8 July 2018
16:00 (D/N)
Scorecard

Montreal Tigers; 176/4 (20 overs)	v	Toronto Nationals; 179/9 (20 overs)
George Worker 62 (52); Mohammad Sami 3/34 (4 overs)		Nitish Kumar 46 (23); Lasith Malinga 3/11 (4 overs)

Toronto Nationals won by 1 wicket
Maple Leaf Cricket Club, King City, Ontario
Umpires: Patrick Gustard (WI) and Bijal Patel (Can)
Player of the match: Nitish Kumar (Toronto Nationals)

- Toronto Nationals won the toss and elected to field.

=== Round 2 ===
10 July 2018
11:00
Scorecard

Cricket West Indies B Team; 162/7 (20 overs)	v	Montreal Tigers; 165/4 (17.3 overs)
Shamar Springer 62 (40); Sandeep Lamichhane 3/31 (4 overs)		Sunil Narine 61 (25); Khary Pierre 2/25 (4 overs)

Montreal Tigers won by 6 wickets
Maple Leaf Cricket Club, King City, Ontario
Umpires: Nigel Duguid (WI) and Bijal Patel (Can)
Player of the match: Sunil Narine (Montreal Tigers)

- Montreal Tigers won the toss and elected to field.

10 July 2018
16:00 (D/N)
Scorecard

Toronto Nationals; 103 (16.5 overs)	v	Vancouver Knights; 104/2 (12.3 overs)
Steve Smith 35 (28); Andre Russell 3/17 (4 overs)		Chadwick Walton 54* (36); Kieron Pollard 1/4 (2 overs)

Vancouver Knights won by 8 wickets
Maple Leaf Cricket Club, King City, Ontario
Umpires: Leslie Reifer (WI) and Vishal Sudhalkar (Can)
Player of the match: Andre Russell (Vancouver Knights)

- Vancouver Knights won the toss and elected to field.

11 July 2018
11:00
Scorecard

Edmonton Royals; 141 (19.5 overs)	v	Winnipeg Hawks; 142/2 (16.4 overs)
Agha Salman 43 (34); Fidel Edwards 4/19 (3.5 overs)		David Warner 42 (35); Mohammad Irfan 1/31 (3 overs)

Winnipeg Hawks won by 8 wickets
Maple Leaf Cricket Club, King City, Ontario
Umpires: Roger Dill (Ber) and Patrick Gustard (WI)
Player of the match: Fidel Edwards (Winnipeg Hawks)

- Winnipeg Hawks won the toss and elected to field.

== Playoffs ==
=== Bracket ===
Playoff 1 / Playoff 2
1	Vancouver Knights	215/6 (20 overs)
2	West Indies B	221/4 (20 overs)
3	Winnipeg Hawks	185/3 (19.5 overs)
4	Edmonton Royals	183/9 (20 overs)

Playoff 3
1	Vancouver Knights	152/5 (13 overs)
3	Winnipeg Hawks	84/5 (8.3 overs) (D/L)

Final
2	West Indies B	145 (17.4 overs)
1	Vancouver Knights	148/3 (17.3 overs)

Playoff 1
12 July 2018
11:00
Scorecard

Vancouver Knights; 215/6 (20 overs)	v	Cricket West Indies B Team; 221/4 (20 overs)
Chadwick Walton 54 (24); Sherfane Rutherford 2/25 (4 overs)		Sherfane Rutherford 134* (66); Tim Southee 2/39 (4 overs)

Cricket West Indies B Team won by 6 wickets
Maple Leaf Cricket Club, King City, Ontario
Umpires: Patrick Gustard (WI) and Bijal Patel (Can)
Player of the match: Sherfane Rutherford (Cricket West Indies B Team)

- Cricket West Indies B Team won the toss and elected to field.

Playoff 2
12 July 2018
16:00 (D/N)
Scorecard

Edmonton Royals; 183/9 (20 overs)	v	Winnipeg Hawks; 185/3 (19.5 overs)
Agha Salman 44 (18); Rayad Emrit 4/28 (4 overs)		Ben McDermott 65* (39); Agha Salman 1/18 (2 overs)

Winnipeg Hawks won by 7 wickets
Maple Leaf Cricket Club, King City, Ontario
Umpires: Nigel Duguid (WI) and Vishal Sudhalkar (Can)
Player of the match: Ben McDermott (Winnipeg Hawks)

- Winnipeg Hawks won the toss and elected to field.

Playoff 3
14 July 2018
15:00 (D/N)
Scorecard

Vancouver Knights; 152/5 (13 overs)	v	Winnipeg Hawks; 84/5 (8.3 overs)
Chadwick Walton 45 (26); Ali Khan 2/47 (3 overs)		Lendl Simmons 35 (20); Fawad Ahmed 2/22 (2 overs)

Vancouver Knights won by 13 runs (D/L method)
Maple Leaf Cricket Club, King City, Ontario
Umpires: Nigel Duguid (WI) and Arnold Maddela (Can)
Player of the match: Chadwick Walton (Vancouver Knights)

- Winnipeg Hawks won the toss and elected to field.
- The match was called off due to bad light, with the par score of 97 at the end of 8.3 overs.

=== Final ===
15 July 2018
15:00 (D/N)
Scorecard

Cricket West Indies B Team; 145 (17.4 overs)	v	Vancouver Knights; 148/3 (17.3 overs)
Fabian Allen 41 (23); Sheldon Cottrell 4/29 (3.4 overs)		Saad Bin Zafar 79* (48); Derval Green 2/20 (3 overs)

Vancouver Knights won by 7 wickets
Maple Leaf Cricket Club, King City, Ontario
Umpires: Bijal Patel (Can) and Leslie Reifer (WI)
Player of the match: Saad Bin Zafar (Vancouver Knights)

- Vancouver Knights won the toss and elected to field.
