= Farhan Malik =

Canadian cricketer (born 1995)

Personal information
- Full name: Muhammad Farhan Malik
- Born: 25 February 1995 (age 31); Quetta, Pakistan
- Batting: Left-handed
- Bowling: Left-arm slow
- Role: Leg spin bowler

International information
- National side: Canada

Domestic team information
- Years: Team
- 2016–: Jamaica Tallawahs

Farhan Malik (born 25 February 1995) is a Canadian cricketer.

== Career ==
On 22 August 2013, after leading the Canada under-19 side through the WICB U19 50-overs Championship, Malik was named the tournaments most valuable player. He was then part of the Canada under-19 side that participated in the 2014 Under-19 Cricket World Cup.

On 10 January 2015, Malik made his debut for the Canada senior cricket team against the Zimbabwe A side. He bowled for three overs, allowing twenty runs. Malik then made his Twenty20 debut for Canada during the 2015 ICC Americas Twenty20 Division One tournament against Bermuda. He bowled for three innings, allowing seventeen runs.

In May 2015, it was announced that Malik was assigned to join the Jamaica Tallawahs of the Caribbean Premier League.

On 3 June 2018, he was selected to play for the Toronto Nationals in the players' draft for the inaugural edition of the Global T20 Canada tournament.
