= Yuvraj Singh =

Indian cricketer (born 1981)

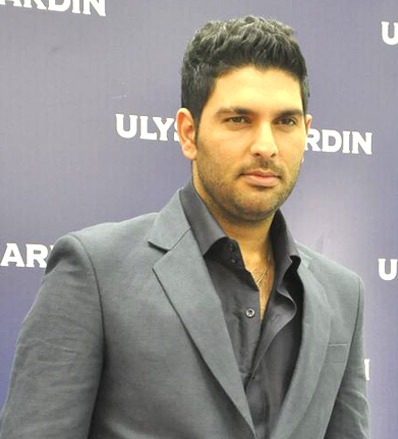
- Yuvraj Singh in 2013

Personal information
- Born: 12 December 1981 (age 44); Chandigarh, India
- Nickname: Yuvi
- Height: 6 ft 2 in (188 cm)
- Batting: Left-handed
- Bowling: Slow left-arm orthodox
- Role: Middle order batsman
- Relatives: Yograj Singh (father); Hazel Keech (m. 2016) (wife)

International information
- National side: India (2000–2017)
- Test debut (cap 247): 16 October 2003 v New Zealand
- Last Test: 9 December 2012 v England
- ODI debut (cap 134): 3 October 2000 v Kenya
- Last ODI: 30 June 2017 v West Indies
- ODI shirt no.: 12
- T20I debut (cap 15): 13 September 2007 v Scotland
- Last T20I: 1 February 2017 v England
- T20I shirt no.: 12

Domestic team information
- Years: Team
- 1996/97–2018/19: Punjab (squad no. 12)
- 2003: Yorkshire (squad no. 12)
- 2008–2010: Punjab Kings (squad no. 12)
- 2011–2013: Pune Warriors India (squad no. 12)
- 2014: Royal Challengers Bangalore (squad no. 12)
- 2015: Delhi Daredevils (squad no. 12)
- 2016–2017: Sunrisers Hyderabad (squad no. 12)
- 2018: Punjab Kings (squad no. 12)
- 2019: Mumbai Indians (squad no. 12)
- 2019: Toronto Nationals (squad no. 12)
- 2019: Maratha Arabians (squad no. 12)

Career statistics
Competition	Test	ODI	T20I	FC
Matches	40	304	58	139
Runs scored	1,900	8,701	1,177	8,965
Batting average	33.92	36.55	28.02	44.16
100s/50s	3/11	14/52	0/8	26/36
Top score	169	150	77*	260
Balls bowled	931	5,048	424	3,408
Wickets	10	111	29	41
Bowling average	60.77	38.68	17.82	48.24
5 wickets in innings	0	1	0	1
10 wickets in match	0	0	0	0
Best bowling	2/9	5/31	3/17	5/94
Catches/stumpings	31/–	94/–	12/–	118/–
Medal record
Men's cricket
Representing India
ICC Cricket World Cup
Winner	2011 India-Bangladesh-Sri Lanka
Runner-up	2003 South Africa-Zimbabwe-Kenya
ICC Champions Trophy
Winner	2002 Sri Lanka
Runner-up	2000 Kenya
Runner-up	2017 England and Wales
ICC T20 World Cup
Winner	2007 South Africa
Runner-up	2014 Bangladesh
ACC Asia Cup
Winner	2016 Bangladesh
Runner-up	2008 Pakistan
ICC U19 World Cup
Winner	2000 Sri Lanka
- Source: ESPNcricinfo, 28 April 2019

Yuvraj Singh (born 12 December 1981) is an Indian former international cricketer who played in all formats of the game. An all-rounder who batted left-handed in the middle order and bowled slow left-arm orthodox, he has won 7 Player of the Series awards in One Day International cricket, which is the joint third-highest by an Indian cricketer, shared with former Indian captain Sourav Ganguly. He is the son of former Indian cricketer and actor Yograj Singh.

Singh was a member of the Indian cricket team in ODIs from 2000 to 2017 and played his first Test match in October 2003. He was the vice-captain of the Indian ODI team between 2007 and 2008. In a match against England at the 2007 World Twenty20, he famously hit six sixes in one over bowled by Stuart Broad—a feat performed only three times previously in any form of senior cricket, and never in an international match between two teams with Test match status. In the same match, he set the record for the fastest fifty in Twenty20 Internationals and in all T20 cricket, reaching 50 runs in 12 balls, which was a record for fastest half century in International cricket, until it was broken by Dipendra Airee during 2023 Asian Games but Singh still holds the record in the ICC Cricket World Cup and among ICC full member nations. During the 2011 World Cup, he became the first player to take a 5-wicket haul and score a 50 in the same World Cup match. During the 2011 World Cup, Singh played eight innings in nine matches and scored 362 runs at a remarkable average of 90.50. He also took 15 wickets in the tournament, maintaining an economy rate of 5.02.

In 2011, Singh was diagnosed with a cancerous tumor in his left lung and underwent chemotherapy treatment in Boston and Indianapolis. In March 2012, he was discharged from the hospital after completing the third and final cycle of chemotherapy and returned to India in April. He made his international comeback in a Twenty20 match in September against New Zealand shortly before the 2012 World Twenty20.

In 2012, Singh was conferred with the Arjuna Award, India's second highest sporting award by the Government of India. In 2014, he was awarded the Padma Shri, India's fourth highest civilian honour. At the 2014 IPL auction, Royal Challengers Bengaluru bought Yuvraj for an all-time high price of ₹14 crore and, in 2015, the Delhi Capitals bought him for ₹16 crore, making him the second most expensive player ever to be sold in the IPL until Chris Morris was sold to the Rajasthan Royals for a record ₹16.25 crore in February 2021. In February 2014, he was honoured with the "Most Inspiring Sportsperson of the Year Award" by FICCI.

On 10 June 2019, Singh announced his retirement from all forms of international cricket. He last represented India in June 2017, against the West Indies. His request for a return to domestic cricket and IPL was turned down by the BCCI over his participation in the Global T20 Canada in Canada and Abu Dhabi T10 in the United Arab Emirates.

== Early years and personal life ==
Yuvraj Singh was born in a Punjabi Jat Sikh family to Yograj Singh, a former Indian cricketer, and Shabnam Singh. Tennis and roller skating were Yuvraj's favourite sports during his childhood and he was quite good at both. He had also won the National Under-14 Roller Skating Championship. His father threw away the medal and told him to forget skating and concentrate on cricket. He would take Yuvraj to training every day.

Singh studied at the DAV Public School in Chandigarh. He completed his graduate degree in commerce from DAV College, Panjab University, Chandigarh. He also did two short roles as a child star in Mehndi Sagna Di and Putt Sardara.

On 12 November 2015, Singh got engaged to British actress Hazel Keech and married her on 30 November 2016. The couple had their first child, a boy named Orion, on 25 January 2022. Their second child, a girl named Aura, was born on 25 August 2023.

== Career ==
=== Youth career ===
Singh began his career with Punjab Under-16s at the age of 13 years and 11 months in November of the 1995–96 season against Jammu and Kashmir-16s. In 1996–97, he was promoted to Punjab Under-19s and scored 137 not out against Himachal Pradesh Under-19s.

Singh made his first-class debut in late-1997 against Odisha during the 1997–98 Ranji Trophy but was dismissed for a duck opening the innings. His first break-out performance came in the Under-19 Cooch Behar Trophy Final of 1999 against Bihar at Jamshedpur; Bihar was all out with a score of 357 and Singh batted at three for Punjab and made 358 runs himself. He represented India in the series against Sri Lanka Under-19s in India in February 1999. In the third ODI, Singh scored 89 runs from 55 balls. In 1999-2000 Ranji Trophy, he scored 149 against Haryana.

In the 2000 Under-19 Cricket World Cup which India won under the captaincy of Mohammad Kaif, Singh's all-round performance earned him the "Player of the Tournament" award and a call-up to the national squad. His performance in the tournament included 68 off 62 and 4/36 against New Zealand in a group stage match, and a quickfire 58 off 25 balls against Australia in the semifinal. Singh was subsequently selected in 2000 for the first intake of cricketers in the National Cricket Academy in Bengaluru.

=== International breakthrough ===
Singh was selected in the Indian squad for the 2000 ICC KnockOut Trophy on the back of his impressive performances for the Under-19 team. He made his international debut against Kenya in the pre-quarterfinal. He bowled four overs conceding 16 runs but did not get to bat. In the quarterfinal match against Australia, Singh won the man of the match for his innings of 84 out of 80 balls, against a pace attack consisting of Glenn McGrath, Brett Lee and Jason Gillespie, that helped India win by 20 runs. In the semifinal against South Africa, he scored 41 and picked 1/15. He scored only 18 against New Zealand in the final, which India lost. The tournament was followed by a tri-series involving India, Sri Lanka and Zimbabwe. Singh scored just 55 runs in five innings at an average of 11. Singh averaged 15.50 in the ODI series against the touring Zimbabwe team in December 2000 after which he was dropped from the team.

Singh made his comeback during the 2001 Coca-Cola Cup in Sri Lanka. He scored a crucial 98* against Sri Lanka in the fifth match of an otherwise disappointing series with the bat. However, he proved to be useful with the ball as he took 8 wickets at an average of 27. In the Standard Bank triangular series involving hosts South Africa, India and Kenya, Singh managed to score only 69 runs from 6 innings, including a duck in the final against South Africa. Following this, Dinesh Mongia and Hemang Badani were chosen over Singh in the squad for the home series against England in January 2002.

He returned to domestic cricket in early 2002. After a disappointing run in the Ranji knockouts, Singh struck 209 for North Zone against South Zone in a Duleep Trophy match in March 2002. He was immediately drafted into the national squad for the final two ODIs against Zimbabwe with India trailing the series 1–2. Singh made an impact in his return match at Hyderabad, scoring an unbeaten 80 off just 60 balls, taking India to a five-wicket win and levelling the series. He won the Man of the Match award for his efforts. In the final ODI at Guwahati, Singh made 75 runs from 52 balls, sharing a 157-run fifth-wicket partnership with Mongia who scored his career-best unbeaten 159, to help India post a total of 333 in their 50 overs. India went on to win the game by 101 runs and the series 3–2.

=== 2002 NatWest Series ===
After winning the ODI series in the West Indies 2–1, where Singh managed scores of only 1 and 10, the Indian team toured England in June for the NatWest triangular series, featuring England, Sri Lanka, and India, and a four-match Test series against the hosts. In the first match at Lord's, Singh won the man of the match for his all-round performance (3/39 and 64*) as India successfully chased down England's total of 271. In the next match against Sri Lanka, he scored 31 and shared a crucial 60-run sixth-wicket partnership with Mohammad Kaif to set up another successful run-chase. India's next match against England was washed out due to rain after Singh had scored an unbeaten 40 off 19 balls to take India to 285/4 in their 50 overs. Singh's knock of 37, along with a fifty from Rahul Dravid, helped India recover from 59/4 to reach a target of 188 posted by Sri Lanka. This win eliminated Sri Lanka from the series with another round of matches still to be played. He had scores of 5 and 8 in the final round of matches but proved to be useful with the ball as he picked one wicket in each of the two games. At the end of the round-robin matches, India topped the points table with 19 points while England finished second with 15 points.

The final was played at Lord's on 13 July between India and England. After winning the toss and electing to bat first, England posted a daunting total of 325/5 in 50 overs. In reply, India was struggling at 146/5 at the end of 24 overs, when Kaif joined Singh at the crease. The pair initially stabilised the innings and later scored at a brisk rate. The pair shared a partnership of 121 runs for the sixth wicket which came to an end when Singh was dismissed for 69 off 63 balls when he top-edged a sweep shot in the 42nd over off the bowling of Paul Collingwood resulting in a simple catch to Alex Tudor at short fine leg. India went on to win the game by two wickets with three balls to spare. This was India's first win in the final of an ODI tournament since 2000, after nine consecutive defeats. This win is regarded as one of India's greatest victories in ODI cricket.

=== Highs and lows ===
Singh batted in two games of the 2002 ICC Champions Trophy, which was held in Sri Lanka in September. He scored 3 against Zimbabwe in the opening match, and 62 in the semifinal against South Africa. India and Sri Lanka won the tournament as joint winners, defeating Australia and all the other competing teams. In November 2002, Singh struggled in the first five games of the 7-match ODI series against West Indies, with a high score of 30. He returned to form in the sixth ODI at Jodhpur with a half-century that helped India win the match by three wickets and level the series 3-3. He top-scored for India in the 7th match with a 69-ball 68, but could not get support from any other batsman. India crashed to a 135-run defeat and lost the series. He struggled for runs in the seven-match ODI series in New Zealand in December 2002-January 2003, averaging just above 19 with a solitary fifty.

Despite his average form leading up to the 2003 ICC Cricket World Cup in South Africa, Singh secured a place in the 15-man Indian squad for the tournament. He scored 37 in India's opening match against Netherlands. In the following games, he had scores of 0, 1 and 7* against Australia, Zimbabwe and Namibia respectively. He then scored a brisk 42 against England, followed by an unbeaten 50 against Pakistan setting up wins for India in both games. In the Super Six stage of the tournament, Singh had scores of 58* against Kenya and 5 against Sri Lanka. He scored 16 in the semifinal against Kenya, and 24 against Australia in the final, which India lost.

Singh scored his maiden ODI century (102* from 85 balls) against Bangladesh at Dhaka on 11 April 2003. In May 2003, Singh was signed up by the Yorkshire County Cricket Club for the 2003 county season. He became only the second Indian after Sachin Tendulkar to represent the county. Singh's Test debut came on 16 October 2003 at his home ground Mohali against New Zealand. Batting at six, he scored 20 in the first innings, and 5* in the second innings. In the TVS Cup tri-series in October–November 2003 involving India, Australia and New Zealand, he scored 113 runs from 7 games at an average of 18.83 and top-score of 44.

Singh returned to form in early-2004 in the tri-series involving Australia and Zimbabwe. He scored 314 runs from 8 innings at an average of 39.25, including his second ODI hundred - 139 runs from 122 balls, with 16 fours and two sixes - against Australia at the Sydney Cricket Ground. He had a mixed tour of Pakistan in March–April 2004. He disappointed in the ODI series with 141 runs from 5 matches, averaging just over 28, but found success in the Test series. In the first Test at Multan, he scored 59 - his maiden Test fifty - as India registered an innings win. He also picked his maiden Test wicket during Pakistan's second innings. In the second Test at Lahore, Singh scored his maiden Test century during India's first innings while the rest of the batting line-up struggled against the bowling of Umar Gul. Singh's score of 112 came from just 129 deliveries with 15 fours and two sixes. He made only 12 runs in the second Test as Pakistan levelled the series after winning the match by 9 wickets. He scored 47 in the final Test at Rawalpindi where India secured the series with another innings victory. However, he suffered a drop in form in the latter half of 2004 with batting averages of 31 in the 2004 Asia Cup, 12.33 in the Natwest Series in England and just 4.50 in the 2004 ICC Champions Trophy. In October 2004, after the first two Tests of the Border-Gavaskar Trophy, he was dropped from the Test squad as his dismal run with the bat yielded just 47 runs from the two matches.

Despite Singh's loss of form, he continued to be a regular feature in the Indian ODI team. In the Platinum Jubilee Match against Pakistan in November 2004, he scored a 62-ball 78 in a losing cause. In December 2004, Singh scored 94 runs at an average of 31.33 in the three-match ODI tour of Bangladesh including a quickfire knock of 69 from 32 balls in the final ODI at Dhaka. He had a disappointing ODI series at home against Pakistan in April 2005, scoring 98 runs in six matches at 19.60.

=== Return to form ===
In July–August 2005, Singh was the leading run-scorer for India in the 2005 Indian Oil Cup triangular series in Sri Lanka also involving the hosts Sri Lanka and West Indies. He scored 192 runs in four matches, averaging 48. He also recorded his third ODI century during the series - 110 runs from 114 balls - against the West Indies at Colombo for which he was adjudged the man of the match. Singh then played in the Videocon Cup in August–September 2005, a triangular series involving India, New Zealand and the host's Zimbabwe. He averaged 54 with the bat in the series, scoring 216 runs from 5 matches. He scored 120 in the final round-robin match against Zimbabwe at Harare, helping India recover from 36/4 to successfully chase down a target of 251. It was his fourth ODI hundred and he won the man of the match award for his efforts. In the two-match Test tour of Zimbabwe that followed the tri-series, Singh scored 12 and 25 runs. In October–November 2005, Singh had a quiet seven-match ODI series at home against Sri Lanka. He managed just 124 runs in six innings at an average of 31 with a top score of 79*.

In November 2005, Singh scored 103 in the first ODI against South Africa at Hyderabad to take India from 35/5 to a respectable total of 249/9, and won the man of the match award despite South Africa winning the game by five wickets. He picked 1/17 and remained not out in the second ODI at Bengaluru, before the third match at Chennai was washed out due to rain. He scored 53 and 49 in the final two matches at Delhi and Ahmedabad respectively, and the series was drawn 2-2. Singh and South African captain Graeme Smith were jointly awarded the Man of the series award as both of them scored 209 runs at 69.66, finishing as the joint-highest run-scorers of the series. Singh had a mixed home Test series against Sri Lanka in December 2005 as he registered two ducks and two half-centuries. He scored 0 & 77* in the second Test at Delhi, and 0 & 75 in the third Test at Ahmedabad as India won both the matches by comfortable margins.

Singh was picked in both Test and ODI squads for the Pakistan tour in January–February 2006. The first two Tests were drawn and Singh batted only once, in the second Test, scoring 4. In the third Test at Karachi, he top-scored for India in both innings. After scoring 45 in the first innings, he went to score his second Test hundred in the second innings (122 runs from 144 balls). India lost the match by 341 runs and the series 1–0. In the one-day series, he continued his good form. He scored a 28-ball 39 in the first ODI at Peshawar which Pakistan won by 7 runs by the Duckworth–Lewis–Stern method. He scored an unbeaten 82 in the second match at Rawalpindi taking India to an emphatic 7-wicket win, before scoring an unbeaten 79 in the third game at Lahore and helping India successfully chase the target of 289. In the low-scoring fourth match at Multan, he scored 37 as India took the series with a five-wicket victory. In the fifth and the final ODI at Karachi, Singh, batting at three, hit his sixth ODI century. His innings of 107* which came off 93 balls with 13 boundaries helped India comfortably chase down a target of 287 while losing only two wickets. He won the man of the match award for this innings and was also adjudged player of the series.

Against England, Singh averaged 21.33 in two Tests in March but proved to be successful with both bat and ball in the ODI series in which he again won the player of the series award. During the series, he won the back-to-back man of the match awards in the third and fourth ODIs. In the third match, he made 103 from 76 balls, and in the fourth match, he picked 2/34 and scored 48. He scored a total of 237 runs in the series at an average of 47.40 and took 6 wickets with his part-time bowling.

On India's tour of the West Indies, Singh hit two fifties in the ODI series. In the second ODI at Kingston, with India needing two runs to win with one wicket in hand and three balls to spare, Singh was bowled by Dwayne Bravo for 93. India went on to lose the series 4–1. His poor run of form in Tests continued, with him scoring 104 runs from four matches at an average of 17.33 and a top-score of 39. In September 2006, Singh was dropped from the playing eleven during the 2006-07 DLF Cup in Kuala Lumpur after he registered two consecutive ducks against Australia and West Indies. He played in two group matches of the 2006 ICC Champions Trophy held in India in October. and scored 27* against England and 27 against West Indies. During a training session before India's final group fixture against Australia, Singh suffered a ligament injury in his left knee. Dinesh Mongia replaced him for the match which India lost to crash out of the tournament. In November, Indian team physio Andrew Leipus suggested that Singh was unlikely to recover from the injury before the start of the World Cup in March 2007.

Singh was not named in any of the Indian squads that toured South Africa in late 2006. In January 2007, less than two months before the World Cup, he made a comeback from injury for the last two matches of the four-match ODI series against West Indies, but did not make much of an impact in either game. Despite concerns over his fitness, Singh was selected in the 15-man Indian squad for the 2007 Cricket World Cup, with chief selector Dilip Vengsarkar confirming that Singh was fit. He featured in the last two matches of the four-ODI series against Sri Lanka in February 2007, and struck an unbeaten 83-ball 95 in the deciding final game at Visakhapatnam. India won the match by seven wickets and the series 2–1.

Singh made 47 in India's first match of the World Cup, a shock defeat to Bangladesh. In India's next group match at Port-of-Spain against World Cup debutants Bermuda, he hit 83 off 46 balls to help India post a total of 413/5, the highest total in World Cup history at the time. After their emphatic against Bermuda, India were left with a must-win final group fixture against Sri Lanka. Chasing 255 to win the match, Singh was run out for 6, as India were bowled out for 185 and made an early exit from the World Cup.

In the three-match ODI series against South Africa in Ireland, Singh took 3 for 36 and scored an unbeaten 49 in the second ODI before winning man of the match for his unbeaten 61 in the series-deciding final game. On India's tour of England, Singh remained on the bench throughout the Test series before finishing third on the run-scorers list in the ODI series with 283 runs from 7 matches at an average of 40.42.

=== 2007 World Twenty20 and vice-captaincy ===
Singh was the vice-captain of the Indian squad at the inaugural ICC World Twenty20 in South Africa. In India's Super 8 match against England at Durban, he hit six sixes in an over off Stuart Broad. In the process, he reached the fastest fifty ever in a Twenty20 game (involving test playing nations), off just 12 balls, which was also the fastest in any form of international cricket. This was the fourth time that six sixes had been hit in one over in senior cricket, the first time in Twenty20 cricket, and the first time in any form of international cricket against a bowler from a Test playing nation. He finished his innings with 58 runs off 16 balls and won the man of the match.

Singh missed the next game against South Africa due to a minor injury but recovered before the semifinal against Australia. In the semifinal, he top-scored with 70 off 30 balls and also hit the longest six of the tournament (119 metres (390 ft) off the bowling of Brett Lee). The knock later was named the Best Twenty20 Batting Performance of 2007 by ESPNcricinfo. India won the match as Yuvraj was awarded another Man of the Match Award. He was dismissed for 14 in the final against Pakistan but India went on to win by 5 runs and win the inaugural Twenty20 World Cup Tournament. All players of the victorious Indian team were given a cash reward of ₹80 lakh by the BCCI while Singh was rewarded with an additional ₹1 crore as well as a Porsche 911 by the BCCI vice-president Lalit Modi. He was named in the 'Team of the Tournament' by ESPNcricinfo for the 2007 T20I World Cup.

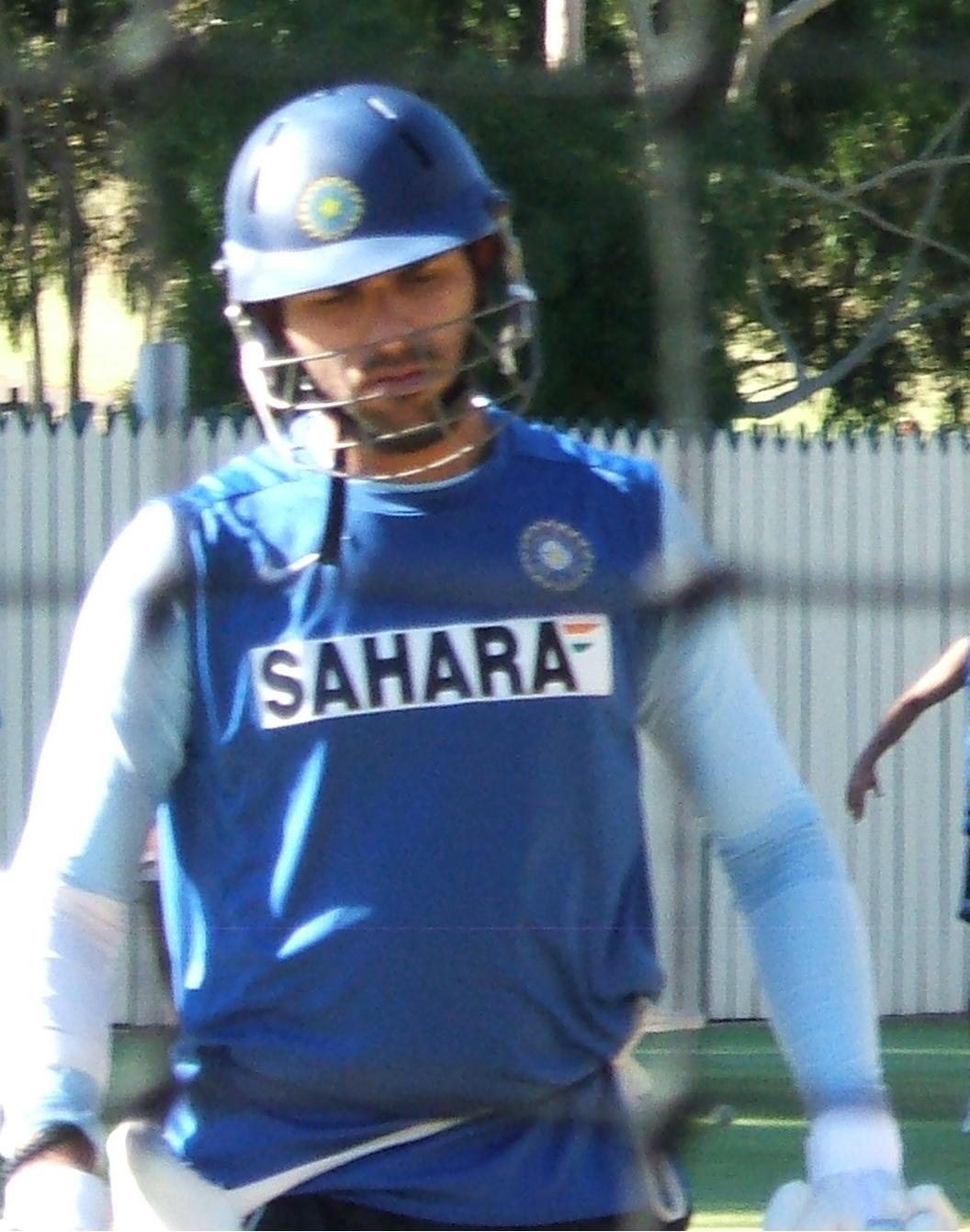
Singh during batting practice in February 2008

In September 2007, MS Dhoni and Singh were named ODI captain and vice-captain respectively, following the resignation of Rahul Dravid. Singh scored 121 at Hyderabad, albeit in a losing cause, in the third of the seven ODIs against Australia, but accumulated only 71 in the other six matches of the series. He enjoyed a return to form in India's home ODI series against Pakistan in November 2007. He scored four half-centuries in five matches, averaging 68, and was named player of the series as India won the series 3–2. He was also fined for showing dissent in the final match in Jaipur. Although Singh was included in Indian squad for the subsequent Test series against Pakistan, Test captain Anil Kumble said that Singh "will have to wait a little bit more to become a regular member in the Test squad." He did not feature in the playing eleven in the first two matches, but was picked in the third Test at Bangalore to replace an injured Sachin Tendulkar. Batting first, India was 61/4 before Singh and Sourav Ganguly shared a 300-run fifth-wicket partnership, and Singh recorded his highest Test score of 169 off 203 balls, while Ganguly went on to score 239 which was also his highest score in tests.

For his performances in 2007, he was named in the World ODI XI by ESPNcricinfo. He was also named in the World T20I XI by ESPNcricinfo.

Singh had a poor Test series against Australia in Indian tour to that country in 2007/08. After his poor showing in the first two Tests, he was dropped for the remainder of the series. In November 2008, he hit 138 not out from 78 balls against England at Rajkot, taking 64 balls to reach his century which at the time was the second fastest by an Indian in ODIs after Mohammad Azharuddin's century in 1988 against New Zealand came off 62 balls. After reaching 50 from 42 balls, he added an additional 88 runs in the next 36 balls. He did so despite straining his back, which necessitated the use of Gautam Gambhir as a runner. This was followed by a score of 118 off 122 balls and bowling figures of 4/28, with all of his wickets being specialist batsmen, in the next match in Indore, earning him two consecutive man of the match awards. Singh scored 85 not out and put on an unbroken partnership of 163 with Sachin Tendulkar to defeat England in the First Test at Chennai in December 2008. It was the fourth highest successful run chase in history and the highest in India. Singh scored a quick, unbeaten 54 in the second innings of the Napier Test against New Zealand to help India save the game after following on. India preserved their series lead and went on to win the series 1–0.

For his performances in 2008, he was named in the World ODI XI by the ESPNcricinfo.

For his performances in 2009, he was named in the World ODI XI by the ICC.

Singh was dropped from the Asia Cup following the team's return from the World Twenty20 in West Indies. A drop in form, disciplinary issues and fitness were talked of as the reasons for his exclusion, but he made a return for the series against Sri Lanka. With Suresh Raina scoring a century on Test debut and Cheteshwar Pujara making a compelling case for higher honours with consistent first-class performances, Singh was dropped from the Test squad for the two-match series against Australia.

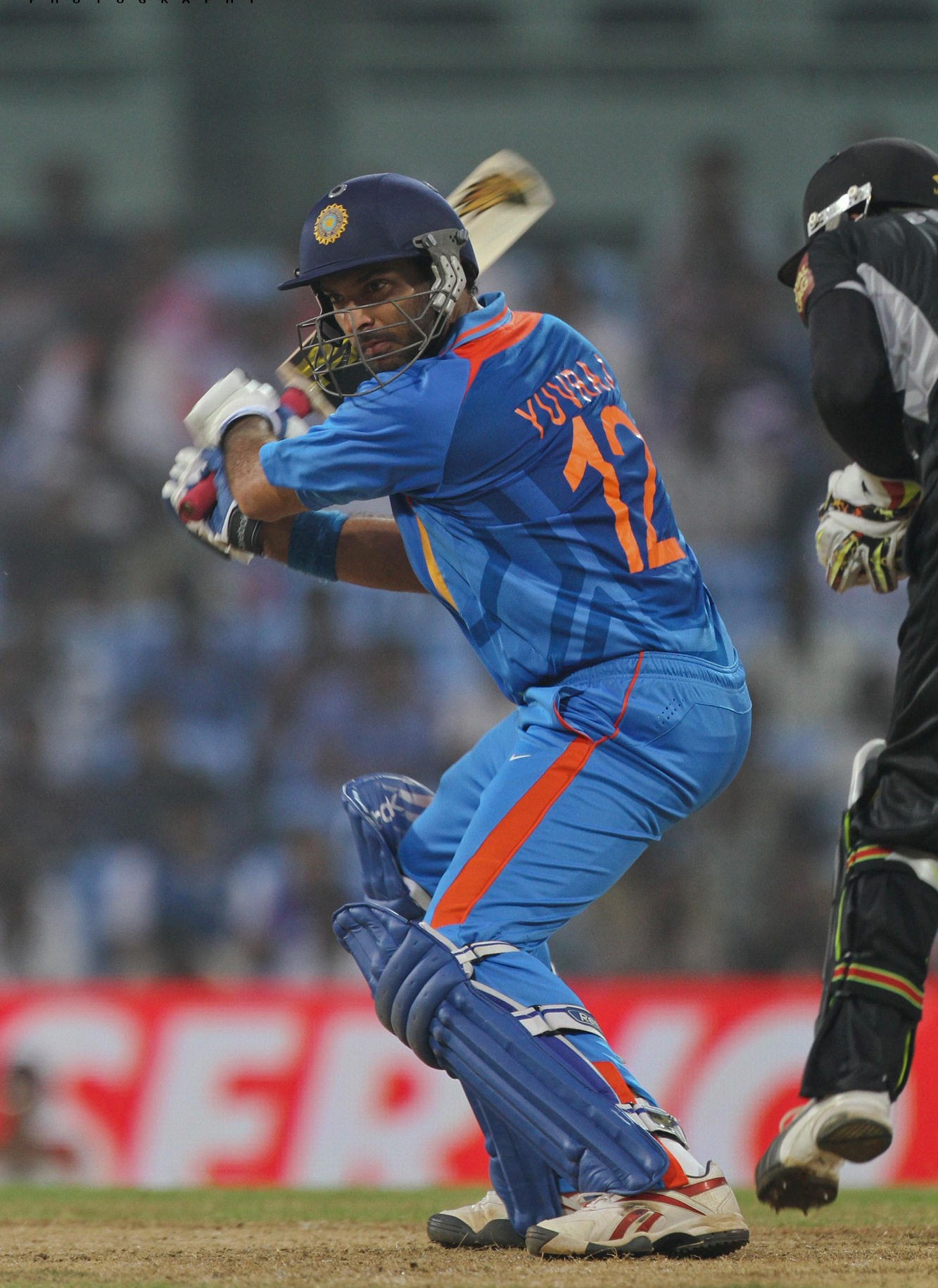
Singh batting against New Zealand in 2010

=== Role in 2011 ICC Cricket World Cup triumph for India ===
Singh had a dream run at the 2011 ICC Cricket World Cup, where he scored 362 runs including one century and four fifties, took 15 wickets, won four Man of the Match awards, the joint-most along with Sri Lanka's Aravinda de Silva in 1996, South Africa's Lance Klusener in 1999 and compatriot Rohit Sharma in 2019, and was also adjudged the Player of the Tournament. In the process, he became the first allrounder to score 300-plus runs and take 15 wickets in a single World Cup. In India's match against Ireland, he became the first player to take 5 wickets and score 50 runs in a World Cup match. He also took his 100th ODI wicket with the dismissal of Wesley Barresi in the World Cup match against the Netherlands. He later took 2/44 and scored 57 runs against the defending champions Australia in the quarterfinals, in all of which India won against Ireland, Netherlands, Australia, earning him the Man of the Match Award.

Singh had respiratory difficulties through 2011 and in May, he withdrew from the ODI series in the West Indies due to an illness. His issues began with breathing difficulties, nausea and bouts of vomiting blood. He toured England but had to return home after breaking his finger in the Nottingham Test and later played two home Tests against West Indies. However, he then pulled out of the ODI series against West Indies in November citing an abnormal tumour in his lung. Singh had originally targeted the CB series in Australia for his return to international cricket.

After the World Cup, he was diagnosed with a cancerous tumour stage-1 in his left lung and underwent chemotherapy treatment at the Cancer Research Institute in Boston, United States as well as the Indiana University Melvin & Bren Simon Cancer Centre in Indianapolis, Indiana where he was cared for by famed oncologist Dr. Lawrence Einhorn.

For his performances in 2011, he was named in the World ODI XI by the ICC and ESPNcricinfo. He was named in the 'Team of the Tournament' for the 2011 World Cup by the ICC and ESPNcricinfo.

=== Cancer diagnosis and comeback ===
Singh's cancer was detected by a Russian doctor in 2011. In March 2012, Singh was discharged from hospital after completing the third and final cycle of chemotherapy and returned to India in April. After his chemotherapy sessions treating seminoma in Indianapolis, Singh's cancer showing full signs of remission, and he aimed at resuming cricket at the World Twenty20. The selectors picked Singh to be a part of the 15-member Indian squad for the 2012 ICC World Twenty20 in Sri Lanka in September 2012.

He played against New Zealand in a T20I at Chennai where he scored 34 off 26 balls (1 four, 2 sixes) as his team lost by only 1 run. He started his World Twenty20 campaign with a 3/24 against Afghanistan. He took 1/16 against Australia, 2/16 against Pakistan and a 2/23 against South Africa. He ended up being the highest wicket taker for India in the tournament though he could not meet expectations with his bat.

He got selected for the Test series against England at home. He later played 3 test matches in the 4 match test series against England after which he was dropped. He later was selected for the India-Pakistan Series, returning to form in the second T20I by scoring a blistering 72 off just 36 balls. He could not make an impact in the One Day series against Pakistan and England, only scoring 1 half century in 7 matches.

For his performances in 2012, he was named in the T20I XI of the year by ESPNcricinfo.

In September 2013, Singh made a comeback to India's limited-overs squad for the Twenty20 and first three ODIs of the home series against Australia.

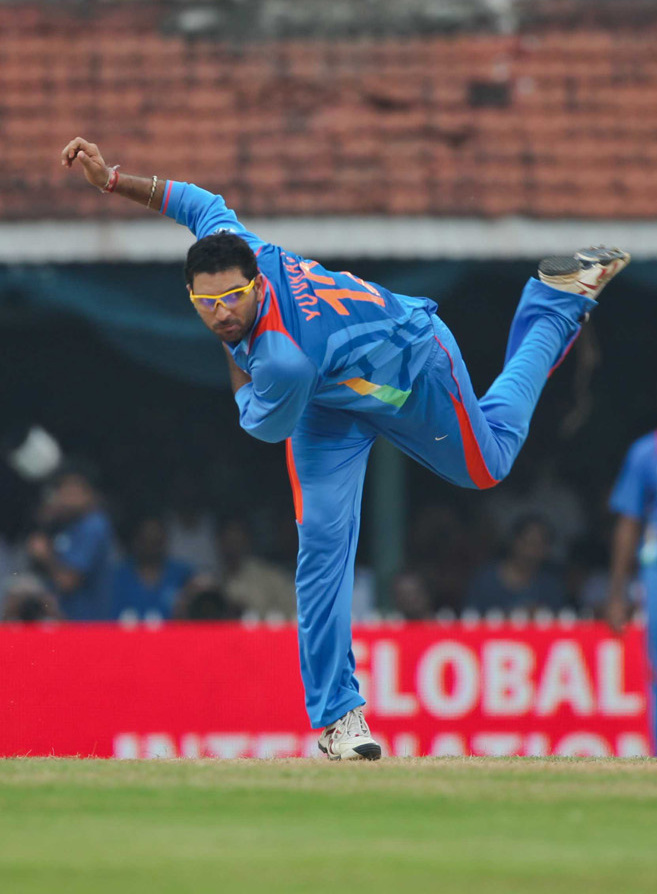
Singh bowling in 2010

In October 2013, Singh scored 77 off 35 in the only T20I against Australia at Niranjan Shah Stadium in Rajkot. India faced a required run rate of nearly 12 per over when at 100 for 4 in the 12th over, but Singh's unbeaten 102 run partnership with Dhoni guided India to victory. However, Singh had a woeful time in the ODI series that followed, scoring 19 runs in four innings, and being visibly troubled by the pace of Mitchell Johnson.

Singh was unable to return to form in both the home ODIs against West Indies and in the subsequent tour of South Africa, and was dropped for the New Zealand tour given the conditions in that country and the hosts' pace-heavy attack. He was not selected for 2014 Asia Cup in Bangladesh but he was selected for the 2014 ICC World Twenty20 in the same place. In a Super 10 match against Pakistan, he missed a full delivery and was bowled on his second ball by pacer Bilawal Bhatti. In the same match he dropped a catch that would have resulted in the wicket of Mohammad Hafeez, and later against the West Indies dropped a delivery hit by Chris Gayle.

Singh then scored 60 off 43 balls against Australia at Mirpur, his eighth T20I fifty and third against Australia. His 84-run partnership with MS Dhoni is India's third-highest for the fifth wicket.

On 5 July 2014, he played for the Rest of the World XI against the Marylebone Cricket Club (MCC) in the Bicentenary Celebration match at Lord's, as he had been left out of India's ODI team. Under Shane Warne's captaincy, he struck a century at nearly a run a ball to rescue his team, who were struggling at 59 for 3. His 100 came up as he hit Sachin Tendulkar for a boundary. The Rest of the World finished on 293 for 7 after 50 overs, but the MCC went on to win the match by 7 wickets.

Singh in an interview with Hindustan Times during his cancer treatment, said 'Even if I die, let India win the World Cup.' in 2011, which India did really won.

Notably, Singh was one of five senior members of India's 2011 World Cup squad who were not considered for the 2015 Cricket World Cup and was not included in India's 30-man probable list for the tournament.

=== Late career ===
Singh was picked in India's T20I squad for the January 2016 Australia tour on the back of strong performances in Vijay Hazare Trophy, where he was the third-highest run scorer with 341 runs at an average of 85.25. He finished the three-match series with 15 runs after getting to bat in just one innings, while also taking two wickets. He played a crucial role in India's titular run in Asia Cup 2016, often teaming up with Virat Kohli to take the team home. He was also a part of the Indian team in the ICC T20 World Cup 2016. He was not named in the T20I squad for India's tour of West Indies in August. Meanwhile, he was named captain of the India Red team for the 2016–17 Duleep Trophy. His team lost to India Blue in the final.

Singh was picked in India's ODI squad for the home series against England in January 2017. This came on the back of his fine performances in the Ranji Trophy, having scored 672 runs in five games for Punjab, which included a 260 against Baroda. In the second match of the series, he scored his career best score 150, which came off 127 balls, a knock that included 21 fours and three sixes. He put on 256 runs for the fourth wicket along with Dhoni and helped the team post a total of 381. Following the team's 15-run victory, he was named the Player of the Match.

Following the match, Singh revealed that he had thought of quitting after having been dropped from the team. He said, "When I came back from cancer it was hard work. I was not performing and after being dropped I thought about whether I wanted to continue or not."

Singh was selected to play in the Champions Trophy 2017. He scored 53 off 32 balls in a group stage match against Pakistan and won the man of the match award. However, as a result of failing to clear the yo-yo test, Singh was dropped from the squad before the tour of Sri Lanka in August 2017 which ended his international career.

=== Retirement from international cricket ===
On 10 June 2019, Singh announced his retirement from international cricket. he held a press conference in Mumbai where he announced his decision to retire from all formats of the game. He said that he had decided to "move on". Yuvraj recounted his best memories through his career, while also recalling his worst.

"I would say I am extremely lucky to play 400-plus games for India. I would've not imagined doing this when I started my career in cricket. Through this journey, some matches that remain in my memory are - the 2002 NatWest series final, my first Test hundred in Lahore in 2004, the 2007 Test series in England, of course the six sixes and the 2007 T20 World Cup. And then the most memorable one was the 2011 World Cup finals."

"And then, probably the worst day in my career, was the 2014 World T20 final against Lanka where I scored 11 off 21 balls. It was so shattering that I felt my career was over."

He also said "As for now, I have decided to provide service and help for people affected by cancer."

==== Speculations of return ====
In September 2020, Singh hinted at making a return to the Punjab team and play domestic T20s for them. He said that it was on the suggestion of Punjab Cricket Association secretary Puneet Bali that he had considered to come out of retirement. However, his return was denied by the Punjab Cricket Association, as he had taken part in foreign franchise leagues.

== T20 franchise cricket ==
=== Indian Premier League ===
Singh was the icon player and captain for Indian Premier League (IPL) team Punjab Kings in the first two seasons; in 2010, the third season, icon player status was discontinued and the captaincy given to Kumar Sangakkara. Punjab Kings came second in the round-robin phase of the tournament, but lost the semi-finals to Chennai Super Kings. On 1 May 2009, Singh registered his first hat-trick in T20 cricket against Royal Challengers Bengaluru at Kingsmead in Durban, the same ground where he hit his six sixes. He dismissed Robin Uthappa, Mark Boucher and Jacques Kallis. On 17 May 2009, Singh took his second Twenty20 hat-trick against Deccan Chargers at the Wanderers Stadium in Johannesburg. Singh dismissed Herschelle Gibbs, Andrew Symonds and Venugopal Rao.

The Pune Warriors India were a new team introduced for the 2011 IPL. Singh was bought by the team and chosen as captain. Pune Warriors finished ninth, ahead of only the Delhi Capitals. From 14 matches, Singh took 11 wickets and also scored 343 runs at an average of 34.30, including two half-centuries. After much controversy, the BCCI allowed Pune Warriors to find a replacement for Singh for the 2012 Indian Premier League, citing his medical condition and non-availability for 2012 IPL as the reasons for doing so.

In 2014, Singh was bought by the Royal Challengers Bengaluru for 14 crore. A Kingfisher employee union sent a letter to Yuvraj requesting him not to play for Royal Challengers Bengaluru. He had a successful stint with RCB, scoring 376 runs and taking six wickets. In 2015, he was bought by Delhi Capitals for Rs.16 Crores, the highest ever bid at an IPL auction at the time.

In the 2016 IPL auction he was bought by Sunrisers Hyderabad for Rs.7 crores. He had a very successful IPL campaign with the Sunrisers Hyderabad with them winning the 2016 Indian Premier League. He played several crucial knocks at crunch moments, and some experts called him the "Unsung hero of SRH's titular run". Singh scored 38 runs from 23 balls in the final.

Singh was retained by Sunrisers Hyderabad for the 2017 Indian Premier League.

In the 2018 IPL auction, he was picked by Punjab Kings for base price of 2 crores. He scored only 64 runs from 6 innings at a low average of 12.80. He batted at four different positions during those six innings and was not given a consistent run by the team management.

Singh was released by Punjab Kings ahead of the 2019 IPL Auction, where was purchased by Mumbai Indians for his base price of ₹1 crore. He scored 53 in his debut match for Mumbai Indians, and smashed a hattrick of sixes against Yuzvendra Chahal in the next match, but he wasn't given a longer run by the team management, and was dropped after he failed in the next two matches. That year, he won his 2nd IPL trophy. But, he was released by the Mumbai Indians ahead of the 2020 IPL auction.

=== Global T20 Canada ===
In June 2019, Singh was signed as a marquee player by the Toronto Nationals for the second edition of the Global T20 Canada tournament, held from 25 July to 11 August 2019 in Brampton, Ontario. He was also appointed captain of the team for the season.

Singh made his debut in the tournament against the Vancouver Knights, where he scored only 14 runs off 27 deliveries before being involved in a bizarre dismissal, walking off the field despite not being out. He gradually found rhythm over the course of the tournament, with a notable innings of 45 off 26 balls against the Edmonton Royals, displaying glimpses of his strokeplay. His most impactful performance came in a high-scoring match against the Brampton Wolves, where he scored a quickfire 51 off 22 deliveries, including five sixes and three fours. He also contributed in the field with two catches and a run-out and bowled an over, taking one wicket.

Across six matches in the tournament, Yuvraj scored 153 runs at an average of approximately 25.50, maintaining a strike rate above 130. Though the Toronto Nationals finished fourth in the round-robin stage and were eliminated in the Eliminator, Yuvraj's leadership and experience are said to have had contributed to the team's success.

=== World Championship of Legends 2024 ===
In 2024, Singh captained the India Champions to victory in the inaugural World Championship of Legends, defeating Pakistan in the final.

== Playing style ==
Singh is primarily a left-handed batsman but can bowl part-time left-arm orthodox spin, which he improved in the latter part of his career. He is regarded as a better batsman against fast bowling than spin bowling, and cites the Indian Oil Cup 2005 as a turning point in his career. Singh is one of the athletic fielders in the Indian team, fielding primarily at point & covers with a good aim at the stumps. Singh is a natural stroke player with an aggressive style of play, as seen by his strike rate of above 150 in T20 internationals & just below 90 in ODIs. Many regard him as one of the best clean strikers of the ball, with his trademark punch through the covers a treat to watch. When in good touch, he can clear the ropes quite effortlessly. An ESPNcricinfo report published in late 2005 showed that since 1999, he was the fourth most prolific fielder in affecting ODI run outs, and of those on the list of prolific fielders, he had the second highest rate of effecting a run out.

== Achievements and honours ==
- In a 2007 ICC World Twenty20 match, he hit six sixes in a single over.
- He holds the record for 2nd fastest T20 International fifty by scoring it in 12 balls against England national cricket team during the 2007 ICC World Twenty20.
- He was the Player of the Tournament in the ICC Cricket World Cup 2011.
- He was awarded with the Arjuna Award (India's second-highest sporting honour) in 2012 by the Prime Minister of India and President of India.
- In 2014, he was awarded with the Padma Shri Award.
- In February 2014, he was honoured with FICCI Most Inspiring Sportsperson of the Year Award.
- He is a two-time Indian Premier League champion. He won one championship with the Sunrisers Hyderabad in 2016 and another one with the Mumbai Indians in 2019.

== Outside cricket ==
=== Charity and commercial interests ===
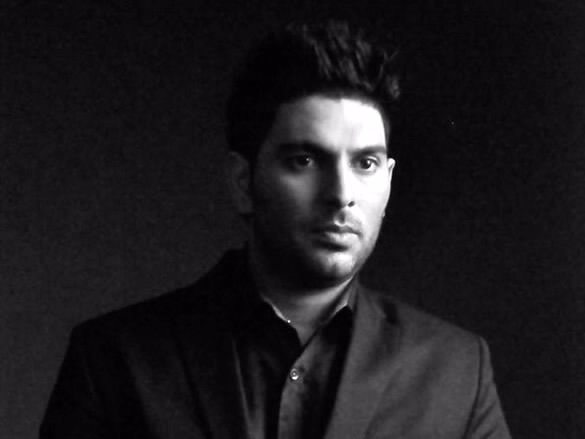
Singh shooting for Ulysse Nardin watches as Ambassador

Singh was signed by Microsoft to be a brand ambassador for the Xbox 360 video game console when it was launched in India in 2006. He appeared in advertisements for the console alongside Bollywood actor Akshay Kumar. Codemasters' cricket video game Brian Lara International Cricket 2007 was released with his endorsement in India, titled "Yuvraj Singh International Cricket 2007". The Bollywood animated film, Jumbo features cricketer Yuvraj Singh's voice therefore starting his career in Bollywood. The unreleased animated full-length feature film Captain India features Yuvraj Singh as the main protagonist.

Singh has also been involved in sports based e-commerce; he is a brand ambassador of sports365.in, an online store focused on selling sports goods and fitness equipment. Singh is also the brand ambassador for the sports brand Puma. He was appointed as the brand ambassador of Ulysse Nardin watch in 2013.

Singh's own charity YouWeCan has treated over hundreds of cancer patients. In April 2015, he announced the intention to invest INR 40–50 crores in online startups, expanding the YouWeCan proposition by setting up YouWeCan Ventures in order to do so. In 2015, YouWeCan also initiated the nationwide cancer awareness in association with Jayakrishnan, the founder of Heyyo Media. The campaign took cancer awareness to many students across the country. Yuvraj Singh also participated in the 'Celebrity Clasico 2016' which was played with an objective to generate funds for charitable initiatives.

=== Miscellaneous ===
In October 2021, Singh was arrested for allegedly using a casteist slur in breach of ST/SC act. He was released on bail. In September 2025, Singh appeared before the Enforcement Directorate (ED) in New Delhi for questioning in relation to an investigation under the Prevention of Money Laundering Act (PMLA) concerning the online betting app 1xBet.

Preceded by Glenn McGrath	World Cup Player of the Series winner 2011	Succeeded by Mitchell Starc
