= Global T20 Canada =

Professional T20 cricket tournament in Canada

- Countries: Canada
- Administrator: Cricket Canada, National Cricket League (NCL) Canada
- Format: Twenty20
- First edition: 2018
- Latest edition: 2026
- Tournament format: Round-robin and playoffs
- Number of teams: 5
- Current champion: Toronto Kings (1st title)
- Most runs: Rassie van der Dussen (699)
- Most wickets: Saad Bin Zafar (37)
- 2026 Global T20 Canada

Global T20 Canada (or GT20 Canada) is a professional Twenty20 cricket tournament that is played in Canada. The first edition of the tournament took place during June and July 2018 with six teams competing. Each team featured four local Canadian cricketers in each squad, along with international players. The inaugural tournament in 2018 took place at the Maple Leaf Cricket Club in King City, Ontario, while the 2019, 2023 and 2024 tournaments took place at the Brampton Sports Park in proximity to the TD Cricket Arena in Brampton, Ontario. The league was founded by Bombay Sports Limited.

Cricket Canada announced the termination of their contract with Bombay Sports Limited in December 2024. The rights to the GT20 were acquired by Dallas-based National Cricket League in April 2025.

== History ==
The International Cricket Council (ICC) sanctioned the tournament in February 2018, and it is the first fully sanctioned T20 league in North America outside of the Caribbean. Canada's Prime Minister, Justin Trudeau, was pleased with the ICC's decision to approve the league.

In May 2018, Cricket Canada announced that the inaugural edition of the tournament would be held from 28 June to 15 July at the Maple Leaf Cricket Club in King City, Ontario The Vancouver Knights won the tournament, beating West Indies B by seven wickets in the final.

The inaugural 2018 season was benefitted by the international suspensions of Australian players David Warner and Steve Smith, who were ineligible to represent Australia, and decided to ply their trade in the domestic Canadian competition.

The 2019 league was held at the Brampton Sports Park grounds by TD Cricket Arena in Brampton, Ontario from 25 July to 11 August. The second-round game between Montreal Tigers and Toronto Nationals on 7 August was delayed for two hours in a protest over unpaid wages; some pay issues dated back to the 2018 tournament. The protest occurred even though Toronto Nationals captain Yuvraj Singh's fundraiser for his YouWeCan Foundation, had been hosted two days earlier by League organizers.

The third season of the tournament, scheduled to be held in 2020, was postponed due to the COVID-19 pandemic to 2021. Originally planned to be played in Brampton, it was later announced that it would be held from 24 June to 11 July 2021 in Kuala Lumpur, Malaysia due to ongoing pandemic restrictions in Canada. Edmonton Royals were renamed as Surrey Jaguars. The 2021 tournament was ultimately cancelled "due to evolving concerns regarding COVID-19 and strict preventive measures taken by the Government of Malaysia to contain the spread of the pandemic."

The 2023 Global T20 Canada took place from 20 July to 6 August at the TD Cricket Arena by CAA Centre once again.

The 2024 Global T20 Canada took place from 25 July to 11 August at the TD Cricket Arena by CAA Centre as well.

In December 2024, Cricket Canada terminated its agreement with Bombay Sports for breach of contract. Cricket Canada president Amjad Bajwa claimed that "the organizers have often been late with their payments and we couldn’t carry on in this fashion. They always wanted us to obtain permission to set up the league for the following year before we received any back payment and I viewed this as a form of blackmail." On March 18, 2025, in spite of the terminated agreement announcement by Cricket Canada, GT20 League director Karan Singh stated, "we will see you in Toronto in the summer. There are multiple things going on right now and we basically do not accept the cancellation. This has left a bad taste in the mouth as there hasn’t even been a courtesy call from their end. I cannot say anything more as our legal counsels in Canada and India are handling the matter."

On April 14, 2025, Cricket Canada announced that they had awarded a long-term licensing deal to National Cricket League (NCL) Canada to operate the GT20 Canada tournament going forward. With the change in partner, Mayor Patrick Brown told CBC Toronto's Here and Now in July 2025 that Global T20 Canada would not take place that year, but that he hoped for the tournament to return in 2026.

In January 2026 it was announced that the tournament would return, being hosted in Toronto from July to August 2026. Six teams were announced for the 2026 season, with new names.

In September 2026, it was announced that the 2026 edition would instead be staged in the Caribbean, with matches to be held at Arnos Vale Stadium in Kingstown, Saint Vincent and the Grenadines during the October–November window. The tournament was described as a one-season Caribbean edition intended to strengthen ties between Cricket Canada and Cricket West Indies (CWI), with the 2027 competition planned to be played in Canada. CWI would also take a direct franchise investment in the competition. The tournament was scheduled to return to Canada for its 2027 edition.

== Teams ==
Team	Captain	Head coach
Brampton Blazers	Hamza Tariq	Ramesh Subasinghe
Mississauga Skyhawks	Unmukt Chand	Lance Klusener
Montreal Warriors	William Bosisto	Amrinder Bhinder
Toronto Kings	Dwaine Pretorius	Rayad Emrit
Vancouver Guardians	Rony Talukdar	Pedro Collins

=== Former teams ===
Team	Debut	Last
Edmonton Royals	2018	2019
Montreal Tigers	2018	2024
Toronto Nationals	2018	2024
Winnipeg Hawks	2018	2019
Vancouver Knights	2018	2024
West Indies B	2018	
Brampton Wolves	2019	2024
Mississauga Panthers	2023	
Surrey Jaguars	2023	2024
Bangla Tigers Mississauga	2024	

== Results ==
Season	Venue	Final			Player of the series
Season	Venue	Winner	Margin	Runner-up	Player of the series
2018	Maple Leaf Cricket Club, King City	Vancouver Knights; 148/3 (17.3 overs)	Won by 7 wickets	West Indies B 145 (17.4 overs)	Lendl Simmons (Winnipeg Hawks)
2019	TD Cricket Arena, Brampton	Winnipeg Hawks; 192/8 (20 overs); 21/0 (S/O)	Won S/O by 5 runs	Vancouver Knights; 192/6 (20 overs); 16/1 (S/O)	JP Duminy (Winnipeg Hawks)
2023	TD Cricket Arena, Brampton	Montreal Tigers; 135/5 (20 overs)	Won by 5 wickets	Surrey Jaguars; 130/5 (20 overs)	Sherfane Rutherford (Montreal Tigers)
2024	TD Cricket Arena, Brampton	Toronto Nationals; 97/2 (15 overs)	Won by 8 wickets	Montreal Tigers; 96/9 (20 overs)	Junaid Siddique (Toronto Nationals)
2026	Arnos Vale Stadium, Kingstown	Toronto Kings	Final not played due to rain	Montreal Warriors	Evin Lewis (Toronto Kings)

== Records and statistics ==
Category	Statistic	Record holder	Value
Batting records	Most runs	Rassie van der Dussen	699
Batting records	Highest score	Sherfane Rutherford	134*
Bowling records	Most wickets	Saad Bin Zafar	37
Fielding	Most dismissals (wicket-keeper)	Ben McDermott	10
Fielding	Most catches (fielder)	Rassie van der Dussen	19
Team records	Highest total	Vancouver Knights	276/3 vs. Montreal Tigers
Team records	Lowest total	Toronto Nationals	52 vs. Montreal Tigers

== Broadcasting ==
Mediapro was appointed as "global consultant" for Global T20 Canada's media rights in 2019, handling aspects of world feed production and international distribution via its various regional subsidiaries. In 2019, the tournament's Canadian broadcast rights were held by Asian Television Network, with selected matches being televised by the mainstream sports channel TSN. For the 2023 season, the broadcast rights were acquired by CBC Sports, with all matches streaming on CBC Gem, and the CBC Television broadcast network also carrying the championship match.
