= Hamza Tariq =

Canadian cricketer

Personal information
- Born: 20 July 1990 (age 36); Karachi, Pakistan
- Batting: Right-handed
- Role: Wicket-keeper

International information
- National side: Canada (2011-2022)
- ODI debut (cap 74): 7 August 2011 v Afghanistan
- Last ODI: 28 January 2014 v Netherlands
- T20I debut (cap 39): 15 March 2013 v Kenya
- Last T20I: 24 February 2022 v Bahrain

Domestic team information
- Years: Team
- 2017: Trinbago Knight Riders

Career statistics
Competition	ODI	T20I	FC	LA
Matches	7	26	6	36
Runs scored	116	324	203	558
Batting average	16.57	29.45	22.55	17.43
100s/50s	0/1	0/3	0/1	0/2
Top score	71	63*	52	71
Catches/stumpings	5/1	16/6	12/2	41/10
- Source: ESPNCricinfo, 26 January 2025

Hamza Tariq (born July 21, 1990) is a Pakistani-born Canadian international cricketer. He plays as a wicket-keeper for the Canada national cricket team, making his international debut in 2011. He played franchise cricket in the Caribbean Premier League and Global T20 Canada.

== Personal life ==
Tariq was born in Karachi, Pakistan. His family immigrated to Canada when he was 12 years old. He began playing cricket in Calgary, Alberta, at the age of 15. As of 2016 he was an accounting student at the Southern Alberta Institute of Technology.

== International career ==
Tariq played two games for the Canada Under-19s at the 2010 Under-19 Cricket World Cup in New Zealand.

He was part of Canada's squad for the 2011 Cricket World Cup in India, but did not play any games at the tournament. During the tournament in India, he was the target of a corrupt approach, which he reported to the ICC Anti-Corruption Unit.

In January 2018, he was named in Canada's squad for the 2018 ICC World Cricket League Division Two tournament.

In September 2018, he was named in Canada's squad for the 2018–19 ICC World Twenty20 Americas Qualifier tournament.

In August 2019, he was named in Canada's squad for the Regional Finals of the 2018–19 ICC T20 World Cup Americas Qualifier tournament. In September 2019, he was named in Canada's squad for the 2019 Malaysia Cricket World Cup Challenge League A tournament. In October 2019, he was named in Canada's squad for the 2019 ICC T20 World Cup Qualifier tournament in the United Arab Emirates.

In October 2021, he was named in Canada's squad for the 2021 ICC Men's T20 World Cup Americas Qualifier tournament in Antigua. In February 2022, he was named in Canada's squad for the 2022 ICC Men's T20 World Cup Global Qualifier A tournament in Oman.

== Franchise career ==
Tariq was drafted by the Trinbago Knight Riders for the 2016 Caribbean Premier League. He scored a crucial 18 runs in the team's victory over St Kitts and Nevis Patriots in the final of the 2017 Caribbean Premier League.

On 3 June 2018, he was selected to play for the Winnipeg Hawks in the players' draft for the inaugural edition of the Global T20 Canada tournament. In June 2019, he was selected to play for the Winnipeg Hawks franchise team in the 2019 Global T20 Canada tournament. In the 2023 Global T20 Canada tournament, Tariq was selected to play for the Toronto Nationals team.

In July 2026, He was drafted by Mississauga Masters for the 2026 Canada Super 60 season.
