= YouWeCan =

Indian non-profit organization

- YouWeCan
- Formation: 2012
- Founder: Yuvraj Singh
- Location: India
- Website: youwecan.org

YouWeCan is an Indian non-profit organization dedicated to fighting cancer. It was established in 2012 by Indian ex-cricketer Yuvraj Singh with the help of his mother, Shabnam Singh. The association focuses on four key areas: cancer awareness, screening, treatment support, and survivor empowerment. YouWeCan's operations are primarily in India.

In 2012, Yuvraj Singh was diagnosed with cancer that was successfully treated in the United States. This experience inspired him to launch YouWeCan.

In September 2012, the YouWeCan app was initially launched by Microsoft for the Windows Phone. For each purchase of the app, Singh donates ₹565 (US$5.90) to the foundation. In September 2012, Colors and YouWeCan announced a television show, Zindagi Abhi Baaki yHai, inspired by Yuvraj Singh's story of beating cancer.

In April 2015, Yuvraj Singh announced his intention to invest INR 40-50 crores in tech startups and expanding YouWeCan by setting up YouWeCan Ventures. Initial investments were made in Vyomo, Moovo, Healthians, EduKart, JetSetGo, and most recently Cartisan.

== History ==
The YouWeCan Foundation operates different entities with varied objectives, partners with other organizations, and creates a funding medium. YouWeCan Ventures, one of the entities of the YouWeCan Foundation, supports entrepreneurs. It was founded in 2013.

The foundation organizes awareness programs in rural areas focusing on oral, breast, and cervical cancers and facilities in district-level community health centers for cancer screening. By July 2020, the foundation had screened over 150,000 people.

By 2019, the foundation supported the treatment of 25 children suffering from cancer. In 2020, Payback India extended support to the YouWeCan Cancer Foundation to aid children's treatments. Currently, the foundation runs a treatment fund for pediatric patients, providing financial assistance to underprivileged and low-income families with a household income of less than Rs 2 lakhs annually.

The foundation also organizes anti-tobacco workshops as well as tobacco-cessation counseling.

YouWeCan has invested in several startups, including Healthians, Holosuit, JetSetGo, EazyDiner, and Wellversed. In 2020, YouWeCan invested in the nutrition product startup Wellversed for an unknown amount with an enterprise value of Rs 100 crore.

In one initiative in June 2020, YouWeCan Foundation and OctaFX launched a mutual relief campaign to provide help for communities in India. OctaFX started a campaign called "Trade from home, help battle COVID-19" in April 2020 to donate for each lot traded. From 23 April to 22 May, OctaFX's overall donation amount amassed $82,332, which was donated to various charity organizations in Asia. Following this principle, OctaFX transferred a portion of its charity funds to the YouWeCan Foundation.
