= Ramesh Subasinghe =

Sri Lankan cricketer

Personal information
- Full name: Don Ramesh George Subasinghe
- Born: 9 October 1983 (age 43); Colombo, Sri Lanka
- Batting: Left-handed
- Bowling: Right-arm fast-medium
- Role: Bowler Coach
- Source: Cricinfo

Don Ramesh George Subasinghe (born 9 October 1983) is a Sri Lankan-New Zealand cricket coach and former first-class cricketer. As a player, he represented Nondescripts Cricket Club, Colombo, as an opening bowler and a left-handed batsman. He is the head coach of the West Indies Men's professional Academy.

Subasinghe was born in Colombo, Sri Lanka, and was educated at St Peter's College, Colombo. His best first-class bowling figures were 6 for 48. Subasinghe gave up on his first class cricket career after series of injuries and now works as a full-time cricket coach. He was the head coach for Hawke Cup District, Horowhenua-Kapiti Cricket Association; he played and coached the multiple trophy winning Paraparaumu Cricket Club in 2016–18. He has also worked at Northern Districts Cricket Association as a development officer and a performance coach.

Subasinghe appeared in Strongbow's 'earn it' campaign in 2013 for a club cricketer to face an over from James Anderson where he bowled and was a selector. Subasinghe was awarded Cricket Development Officer of the year award at New Zealand Cricket annual cricket awards in 2021. In June 2021 he was appointed to Performance coaching staff at Otago Cricket Association.

In April 2024, he was appointed the head coach of West Indies Men's Academy. Before joining Cricket West Indies, Subasinghe was Head Coach of the New Zealand Cricket Men's Development Programme, and Pathways Head Coach and Talent Development Manager at the Otago Cricket Association.

In addition to leading the Academy programme, Subasinghe has led a range of high-performance camps and tours for Cricket West Indies, including Academy and Emerging-player development tours, and international preparation camps for both men's and women's international teams.

In August 2024, he was named assistant coach of the West Indies men's team for the three-match T20I home series against South Africa in Trinidad, under head coach Daren Sammy. In September 2026, Subasinghe was named assistant coach of the West Indies women's team. In 2026, Subasinghe was also appointed head coach of the Brampton Blazers franchise for the fifth edition of GT20 Canada.
