= 2009 Cricket World Cup Qualifier =

Cricket tournament in South Africa

2009 ICC Cricket World Cup Qualifier
- Official Logo
- Dates: 1 – 19 April 2009
- Administrator: International Cricket Council
- Cricket format: One Day International (six first round matches, 3rd/5th place play-offs and final); List A cricket (all other matches)
- Tournament format(s): Round-robin and Knockout
- Host: South Africa
- Champions: Ireland (1st title)
- Runners-up: Canada
- Participants: 12
- Matches: 54
- Player of the series: (Netherlands) Edgar Schiferli
- Most runs: (Bermuda) David Hemp (557)
- Most wickets: (Netherlands) Edgar Schiferli (24)

The 2009 ICC Cricket World Cup Qualifier was a cricket tournament that took place in April 2009 in South Africa. It was the final part of the Cricket World Cup qualification process for the 2011 Cricket World Cup.

The tournament was the renamed version of the ICC Trophy, and was the final event of the 2007–09 ICC World Cricket League.

== Teams ==
The following teams, who attained One Day International status from the previous World Cup, and who made up Division One of the World Cricket League qualified automatically. Kenya had not played in the last 2 qualifying tournaments as they were the first associate team to gain ODI status and thus qualified for the 2 previous World Cups automatically but were no longer guaranteed ODI status and once again needed to compete in the qualifying tournament.

- Bermuda
- Canada
- Ireland
- Kenya
- Netherlands
- Scotland

- Promoted through 2007 ICC World Cricket League Division Two:

- United Arab Emirates
- Oman
- Namibia
- Denmark

- Promoted through 2009 ICC World Cricket League Division Three:

- Afghanistan
- Uganda

The top four teams (previously 6) from this tournament qualified for the 2011 Cricket World Cup, while the top six teams gained or maintained One Day International status for the following four years and also automatically qualified for the ICC Intercontinental Cup. The bottom two teams were relegated to 2011 ICC World Cricket League Division Three. The final and the play-offs for third and fifth place were official ODIs.

Ireland won the tournament after beating Netherlands. Ireland, Netherlands, Canada and Kenya all qualified for the 2011 ICC World Cup. Despite not qualifying for the World Cup Afghanistan and Scotland secured ODI status and competed for 5th spot, with Afghanistan winning the playoff.

As a result of the tournament, Afghanistan gained ODI status for the first time. Afghanistan had begun the ICC World Cricket League 2007-09 in the bottom division, but won the Division Five, Division Four and Division Three tournaments to qualify for this event, and ultimately win ODI status. Afghanistan replaced Bermuda as the sixth Associate Nation with ODI status and became the only affiliate member to gain ODI status.

=== Status of games ===
All matches played in this tournament have List A cricket status. Additionally, some matches have One Day International status; these matches are:

- Matches in the group stage played between teams who entered the tournament with ODI status
- Matches in the playoff stage played between teams who finished the tournament with ODI status

None of the Super Eight matches were considered ODIs, even if played between teams who started or finished with ODI status.

Significantly, this meant that Afghanistan's Group Stage matches were not considered ODIs, but its 5th place playoff match against Scotland was considered an ODI.

== Players ==
| Canada | Ireland | Namibia | Oman | Scotland | Uganda |
|---|---|---|---|---|---|
| Ashish Bagai (c); Harvir Baidwan; Balaji Rao; Geoff Barnett; Umar Bhatti; Ian Billcliff; John Davison; Sunil Dhaniram; Sandeep Jyoti; Arvind Kandappah; Eion Katchay; Khurram Chohan; Henry Osinde; Qaiser Ali; Rizwan Cheema | William Porterfield (c); Andre Botha; Peter Connell; Alex Cusack; Trent Johnston; Kyle McCallan; John Mooney; Eoin Morgan; Kevin O'Brien; Niall O'Brien (wk); Andrew Poynter; Boyd Rankin; Regan West; Andrew White; Gary Wilson | Louis Burger (c); Jan-Berrie Burger; Sarel Burger; Louis Klazinga; Bjorn Kotze; Deon Kotze; Hendrik Marx; Bernard Scholtz; Nicolaas Scholtz; Gerrie Snyman; Louis van der Westhuizen; Raymond van Schoor; Ian van Zyl; Tobias Verwey (wk); Craig Williams | Hemal Mehta (c); Adnan Ilyas; Aamer Ali; Awal Khan; Hemin Desai; Farhan Khan; Haider Ali; Khalid Rasheed; Maqsood Hussain (wk); Nilesh Parmar; Rafeeq Al Balushi; Ameet Sampat; Sultan Ahmed; Tariq Hussain; Zeeshan Siddiqui | Ryan Watson (c); John Blain; Kyle Coetzer; Gordon Goudie; Gavin Hamilton; Majid Haq; Moneeb Iqbal; Neil McCallum; Calum MacLeod; Dewald Nel; Navdeep Poonia; Qasim Sheikh; Colin Smith (wk); Jan Stander; Craig Wright | Junior Kwebiha (c); Davis Arinaitwe (wk); Asadu Seiga; Akbar Baig; Nehal Bibodi; Kenneth Kamyuka; Arthur Kyobe; Roger Mukasa; Benjamin Musoke; Frank Nsubuga; Joel Olwenyi; Nand Kishore; Laurence Sematimba; Ronald Ssemanda; Charles Waiswa |
| Afghanistan | Bermuda | Denmark | Kenya | Netherlands | United Arab Emirates |
| Nowroz Mangal (c); Asghar Afghan; Dawlat Ahmadzai; Hameed Hasan; Hasti Gul; Karim Khan (wk); Khaleqdaad Noori; Mohammad Nabi; Mohammad Shahzad; Nasratullah Nasrat; Noor Ali; Raees Ahmadzai; Samiullah Shenwari; Shafiqullah Shafaq; Shapoor Zadran | Irving Romaine (c); David Hemp; Glenn Blakeney; Lionel Cann; Fiqre Crockwell (wk); Jekon Edness (wk); Kyle Hodsoll; Stefan Kelly; Dwayne Leverock; George O'Brien; Steven Outerbridge; Jacobi Robinson; Rodney Trott; Janeiro Tucker; Tamauri Tucker | Frederik Klokker (c, wk); Morten Hedegaard; Bashir Shah; David Borchersen; Bobby Chawla; Henrik Hansen; Thomas Hansen; Rohit Kanaiya; Mickey Lund; Max Overgaard; Carsten Pedersen; Michael Pedersen; Rizwan Mahmood; Soren Vestergaard; Jacob Larsen | Steve Tikolo (c); Rajesh Bhudia; Jimmy Kamande; Alex Obanda; Collins Obuya; Nehemiah Odhiambo; Thomas Odoyo; Peter Ongondo; Lameck Onyango; Elijah Otieno; Kennedy Otieno (wk); Morris Ouma (wk); Rakep Patel; Hiren Varaiya; Seren Waters; Hardik Raval | Jeroen Smits (c, wk); Peter Borren; Mudassar Bukhari; Daan van Bunge; Ryan ten Doeschate; Tom de Grooth; Maurits Jonkman; Alexei Kervezee; Mohammad Kashif; Ruud Nijman; Darron Reekers; Edgar Schiferli; Pieter Seelaar; Eric Szwarczynski; Bas Zuiderent | Khurram Khan (c); Saqib Ali; Aman Ali; Amjad Ali (wk); Amjad Javed; Arshad Ali; Fayyaz Ahmed; Nithin Gopal; Ravi Kumar; Naeemuddin Aslam; Sameer Nayak; Owais Hameed; Qasim Zubair; Zahid Shah |

== Group stage ==
=== Group A ===
| Pos | Team | Pld | W | L | T | NR | Pts | NRR | |
|---|---|---|---|---|---|---|---|---|---|
| 1 | Ireland | 5 | 5 | 0 | 0 | 0 | 10 | 1.492 | Advanced to the Super Eight stage |
| 2 | Canada | 5 | 4 | 1 | 0 | 0 | 8 | 1.490 | Advanced to the Super Eight stage |
| 3 | Scotland | 5 | 3 | 2 | 0 | 0 | 6 | −0.318 | Advanced to the Super Eight stage |
| 4 | Namibia | 5 | 1 | 4 | 0 | 0 | 2 | −0.506 | Advanced to the Super Eight stage |
| 5 | Uganda | 5 | 1 | 4 | 0 | 0 | 2 | −0.928 | Qualified for the 9th and 11th place playoffs and automatically relegated |
| 6 | Oman | 5 | 1 | 4 | 0 | 0 | 2 | −1.144 | Qualified for the 9th and 11th place playoffs and automatically relegated |

1 April
(scorecard)

| Scotland; 232/7 (50 overs) | v | Ireland; 233/3 (37.4 overs) |
| Neil McCallum 121 (138); Boyd Rankin 2/27 (10 overs) | | William Porterfield 101 (89); Calum MacLeod 1/30 (7 overs) |

Ireland won by 7 wickets
Willowmoore Park, Benoni
Umpires: Marais Erasmus and Amish Saheba
Player of the match: William Porterfield

1 April
(scorecard)

| Canada; 247 all out (49.3 overs) | v | Oman; 144 all out (40 overs) |
| Sunil Dhaniram 100* (91); Tariq Hussain 5/39 (10 overs) | | Farhan Khan 43 (36); Khurram Chohan 4/27 (8 overs) |

Canada won by 103 runs
LC de Villiers Oval, Pretoria
Umpires: Sarika Prasad and Rod Tucker
Player of the match: Sunil Dhaniram

1 April
(scorecard)

| Uganda; 234/7 (50 overs) | v | Namibia; 228/9 (50 overs) |
| Roger Mukasa 51 (66); Deon Kotze 2/22 (10 overs) | | Raymond van Schoor 59 (87); Davis Arinaitwe 4/53 (10 overs) |

Uganda won by 6 runs
Stan Friedman Oval, Krugersdorp
Umpires: Kumar Dharmasena and Niels Bagh
Player of the match: Frank Nsubuga

2 April
(scorecard)

| Scotland; 267/6 (50 overs) | v | Namibia; 194 (44.4 overs) |
| Neil McCallum 103 (93); Louis Klazinga 2/60 (9 overs) | | Gerrie Snyman 95* (102); Gordon Goudie 3/24 (6 overs) |

Scotland won by 73 runs
LC de Villiers Oval, Pretoria
Umpires: Subhash Modi and Sarika Prasad
Player of the match: Neil McCallum

2 April
(scorecard)

| Ireland; 285/4 (50 overs) | v | Oman; 169 all out (37.3 overs) |
| Kevin O'Brien 101* (91); Zeeshan Siddiqui 2/44 (10 overs) | | Zeeshan Siddiqui 48 (52); Regan West 5/26 (10 overs) |

Ireland won by 116 runs
Stan Friedman Oval, Krugersdorp
Umpires: Russell Tiffin and Kumar Dharmasena
Player of the match: Regan West

2 April
(scorecard)

| Uganda; 231/8 (50 overs) | v | Canada; 232/5 (47 overs) |
| Kenneth Kamyuka 85 (86); Khurram Chohan 3/31 (9 overs) | | Geoff Barnett 102* (123); Kenneth Kamyuka 2/46 (10 overs) |

Canada won by 5 wickets
Walter Milton Oval, University of the Witwatersrand, Johannesburg
Umpires: Marais Erasmus and Niels Bagh
Player of the match: Geoff Barnett

4 April
(scorecard)

| Canada; 319 all out (50 overs) | v | Namibia; 178 all out (46 overs) |
| John Davison 131 (99); Ian van Zyl 4/53 (7 overs) | | Sarel Burger 75 (115); Umar Bhatti 2/22 (10 overs) |

Canada won by 141 runs
LC de Villiers Oval, Pretoria
Umpires: Kevan Barbour and Amish Saheba
Player of the match: John Davison

4 April
(scorecard)

| Uganda; 155 all out (44.2 overs) | v | Ireland; 160/4 (31 overs) |
| Junior Kwebiha 51 (84); Andrew White 4/22 (10 overs) | | Gary Wilson 61 (72); Frank Nsubuga 2/54 (10 overs) |

Ireland won by 6 wickets
Stan Friedman Oval, Krugersdorp
Umpires: Rod Tucker and Subhash Modi
Player of the match: Andrew White

4 April
(Scorecard)

| Scotland; 274/9 (50 overs) | v | Oman; 265/9 (50 overs) |
| Kyle Coetzer 127 (141); Zeeshan Siddiqui 3/64 (10 overs) | | Maqsood Hussain 70 (30); Jan Stander 4/41 (10 overs) |

Scotland won by 9 runs
Walter Milton Oval, University of the Witwatersrand, Johannesburg
Umpires: Marais Erasmus and Niels Bagh
Player of the match: Kyle Coetzer

6 April
(scorecard)

| Canada; 220 all out (48 overs) | v | Ireland; 223/4 (41 overs) |
| Geoff Barnett 49 (63); Boyd Rankin 2/36 (10 overs) | | Eoin Morgan 84* (100); Umar Bhatti 3/28 (10 overs) |

Ireland won by 6 wickets
Willowmoore Park, Benoni
Umpires: Amish Saheba and Kumar Dharmasena
Player of the match: Eoin Morgan

6 April
(scorecard)

| Namibia; 291/9 (50 overs) | v | Oman; 172 all out (43.4 overs) |
| Craig Williams 64 (44); Tariq Hussain 3/54 (10 overs) | | Awal Khan 62 (93); Sarel Burger 5/44 (10 overs) |

Namibia won by 119 runs
Stan Friedman Oval, Krugersdorp
Umpires: Rod Tucker and Russell Tiffin
Player of the match: Gerrie Snyman

6 April
(scorecard)

| Scotland; 209/8 (50 overs) | v | Uganda; 164 all out (43.1 overs) |
| Neil McCallum 101* (109); Ronald Ssemanda 2/28 (9 overs) | | Junior Kwebiha 69 (107); Jan Stander 2/14 (4.1 overs) |

Scotland won by 45 runs
Walter Milton Oval, University of the Witwatersrand, Johannesburg
Umpires: Kevan Barbour and Sarika Prasad
Player of the match: Neil McCallum

8 April
(scorecard)

| Canada; 252/7 (50 overs) | v | Scotland; 104 all out (30.5 overs) |
| Ashish Bagai 87 (122); Craig White 3/23 (10 overs) | | Colin Smith 43 (57); Umar Bhatti 3/31 (8 overs) |

Canada won by 148 runs
Willowmoore Park, Benoni
Umpires: Marais Erasmus and Rod Tucker
Player of the match: Ashish Bagai

8 April
(scorecard)

| Uganda; 298/5 (50 overs)) | v | Oman; 302/9 (37.1 overs) |
| Joel Olwenyi 85 (89); Hemal Mehta 3/55 (10 overs) | | Farhan Khan 95 (49); Asadu Seiga 4/85 (10 overs) |

Oman won by 1 wicket
LC de Villiers Oval, Pretoria
Umpires: Amish Saheba and Russell Tiffin
Player of the match: Farhan Khan

8 April
(scorecard)

| Namibia; 213/9 (50 overs) | v | Ireland; 214/3 (45 overs) |
| Nicholaas Scholtz 62 (102); Boyd Rankin 2/17 (10 overs) | | William Porterfield 84 (124); Louis van der Westhuizen 1/25 (5 overs) |

Ireland won by 7 wickets
Walter Milton Oval, University of the Witwatersrand, Johannesburg
Umpires: Kevan Barbour and Subhash Modi
Player of the match: William Porterfield

=== Group B ===
| Pos | Team | Pld | W | L | T | NR | Pts | NRR | |
|---|---|---|---|---|---|---|---|---|---|
| 1 | Kenya | 5 | 4 | 1 | 0 | 0 | 8 | 1.683 | Advanced to the Super Eight stage |
| 2 | Netherlands | 5 | 4 | 1 | 0 | 0 | 8 | 0.557 | Advanced to the Super Eight stage |
| 3 | United Arab Emirates | 5 | 4 | 1 | 0 | 0 | 8 | −0.131 | Advanced to the Super Eight stage |
| 4 | Afghanistan | 5 | 2 | 3 | 0 | 0 | 4 | −0.278 | Advanced to the Super Eight stage |
| 5 | Bermuda | 5 | 1 | 4 | 0 | 0 | 2 | −0.441 | Qualified for the 9th and 11th place playoffs and automatically relegated |
| 6 | Denmark | 5 | 0 | 5 | 0 | 0 | 0 | −1.341 | Qualified for the 9th and 11th place playoffs and automatically relegated |

1 April
(scorecard)

| Kenya; 247/8 (50 overs) | v | Netherlands; 248/3 (46.2 overs) |
| James Kamande 58 (50); Edgar Schiferli 4/49 (10 overs) | | Ryan ten Doeschate 106* (84); Peter Ongondo 1/35 (9 overs) |

Netherlands won by 7 wickets
Senwes Park, Potchefstroom
Umpires: Gary Baxter and Enamul Hoque-Moni
Player of the match: Ryan ten Doeschate

1 April
(scorecard)

| Bermuda; 187 all out (46.3 overs) | v | United Arab Emirates; 190/6 (47.1 overs) |
| Janeiro Tucker 66 (81); Khurram Khan 3/40 (9 overs) | | Arshad Ali 41 (89); George O'Brien 2/47 (10 overs) |

United Arab Emirates won by 4 wickets
Fanie du Toit Sports Complex, Potchefstroom
Umpires: Paul Baldwin and Karl Hurter
Player of the match: Khurram Khan

1 April
(scorecard)

| Denmark; 204/9 (50 overs) | v | Afghanistan; 205/5 (46.2 overs) |
| Carsten Pedersen 46 (69); Karim Sadiq 4/27 (8.0) | | Mohammad Shahzad 55* (94); Henrik Hansen 2/43 (10.0) |

Afghanistan won by 5 wickets
Isak Steyl Stadium, Vanderbijlpark
Umpires: Ian Howell and Ian Ramage
Player of the match: Karim Sadiq

2 April
(scorecard)

| Denmark; 245/9 (50 overs) | v | Netherlands; 246/3 (43 overs) |
| Michael Pedersen 121 (132); Edgar Schiferli 3/43 (10 overs) | | Alexei Kervezee 121* (134); Bashir Shah 2/52 (10 overs) |

Netherlands won by 7 wickets
Fanie du Toit Sports Complex, Potchefstroom
Umpires: Jeff Luck and Ian Ramage
Player of the match: Alexei Kervezee

2 April
(scorecard)

| United Arab Emirates; 79 all out (30.2 overs) | v | Kenya; 80/1 (12.2 overs) |
| Naeemuddin Aslam 34 (53); Lameck Onyango 6/14 (10 overs) | | Morris Ouma 50 (38); Zahid Shah 1/13 (3 overs) |

Kenya won by 9 wickets
Isak Steyl Stadium, Vanderbijlpark
Umpires: Gary Baxter and Buddhi Pradhan
Player of the match: Lameck Onyango

2 April
(scorecard)

| Afghanistan; 239/9 (50 overs) | v | Bermuda; 179 (49.3 overs) |
| Karim Sadiq 83 (103); Rodney Trott 2/33 (10 overs) | | Glenn Blakeney 68 (104); Samiullah Shenwari 4/28 (7 overs) |

Afghanistan won by 60 runs
Senwes Park, Potchefstroom
Umpires: Enamul Hoque-Moni and Karran Bayney
Player of the match: Nowroz Mangal

4 April
(scorecard)

| Kenya; 282/5 (50 overs) | v | Afghanistan; 175 all out (47 overs) |
| Kennedy Otieno 109* (136); Karim Sadiq 1/23 (3 overs) | | Mohammad Nabi 56 (71); Thomas Odoyo 3/29 (6 overs) |

Kenya won by 107 runs
Fanie du Toit Sports Complex, Potchefstroom
Umpires: Karl Hurter and Ian Ramage
Player of the match: Kennedy Otieno

4 April
(scorecard)

| Denmark; 157 all out (48.3 overs) | v | Bermuda; 160/1 (38.1 overs) |
| Bobby Chawla 24 (60); Rodney Trott 4/30 (10 overs) | | David Hemp 76* (105); Bashir Shah 1/20 (4 overs) |

Bermuda won by 9 wickets
Isak Steyl Stadium, Vanderbijlpark
Umpires: Gary Baxter and Buddhi Pradhan
Player of the match: Rodney Trott

4 April
(scorecard)

| Netherlands; 265 all out (49.3 overs) | v | United Arab Emirates; 268/8 (49.1 overs) |
| Eric Szwarczynski 56 (88); Arshad Ali 3/45 (7 overs) | | Saqib Ali 78 (88); Edgar Schiferli 3/45 (10 overs) |

United Arab Emirates won by 2 wickets
Senwes Park, Potchefstroom
Umpires: Enamul Hoque-Moni and Ian Howell
Player of the match: Saqib Ali

6 April
(scorecard)

| Bermuda; 259/5 (50 overs) | v | Kenya; 260/3 (45 overs) |
| David Hemp 102* (152); Elijah Otieno 1/13 (5 overs) | | Kennedy Otieno 63 (87); Tamauri Tucker 1/43 (8 overs) |

Kenya won by 7 wickets
Senwes Park, Potchefstroom
Umpires: Ian Howell and Paul Baldwin
Player of the match: David Hemp

6 April
(scorecard)

| Afghanistan; 204/9 (50 overs) | v | Netherlands; 208/5 (46.2 overs) |
| Karim Sadiq 72 (101); Mudassar Bukhari 3/41 (10 overs) | | Daan van Bunge 65* (87); Mohammad Nabi 2/31 (10 overs) |

Netherlands won by 5 wickets
Isak Steyl Stadium, Vanderbijlpark
Umpires: Jeff Luck and Buddhi Pradhan
Player of the match: Daan van Bunge

6 April
(scorecard)

| United Arab Emirates; 379/6 (50 overs) | v | Denmark; 267 (44.4 overs) |
| Amjad Javed 164 (117); David Borchersen 2/60 (6 overs) | | Frederik Klokker 77 (79); Sameer Nayak 2/50 (10 overs) |

United Arab Emirates won by 112 runs
Fanie du Toit Sports Complex, Potchefstroom
Umpires: Karl Hurter and Karran Bayney
Player of the match: Amjad Javed

8 April
(scorecard)

| Netherlands; 304/9 (50 overs) | v | Bermuda; 241/9 (50 overs) |
| Ryan ten Doeschate 67 (78); Rodney Trott 2/43 (10 overs) | | David Hemp 81 (101); Ryan ten Doeschate 3/51 (10 overs) |

Netherlands won by 63 runs
Potchefstroom Cricket Ground, Potchefstroom
Umpires: Ian Howell and Gary Baxter
Player of the match: Ryan ten Doeschate

8 April
(scorecard)

| Afghanistan; 251/8 (50 overs) | v | United Arab Emirates; 257/5 (47.2 overs) |
| Asghar Afghan 69 (107); Zahid Shah 4/59 (10 overs) | | Nithin Gopal 81 (99); Noor Ali 1/6 (0.2 overs) |

United Arab Emirates won by 5 wickets
Vaal University Ground, Vanderbijlpark
Umpires: Paul Baldwin and Jeff Luck

8 April
(scorecard)

| Denmark; 173/8 (50 overs) | v | Kenya; 174/1 (33.1 overs) |
| Mickey Lund 45 (94); Elijah Otieno 3/51 (10 overs) | | Kennedy Otieno 84* (95); Morten Hedegaard 1/15 (5.4 overs) |

Kenya won by 9 wickets
Potchefstroom University Ground, Potchefstroom
Umpires: Karran Bayney and Enamul Hoque-Moni
Player of the match: Kennedy Otieno

== Super Eights ==
| Pos | Team | Pld | W | L | T | NR | Pts | NRR | |
|---|---|---|---|---|---|---|---|---|---|
| 1 | Ireland | 7 | 5 | 2 | 0 | 0 | 10 | 0.689 | Qualified for the 2011 Cricket World Cup and the 2009–10 Intercontinental Cup and gained ODI Status for four years |
| 2 | Canada | 7 | 4 | 3 | 0 | 0 | 8 | 0.687 | Qualified for the 2011 Cricket World Cup and the 2009–10 Intercontinental Cup and gained ODI Status for four years |
| 3 | Kenya | 7 | 4 | 3 | 0 | 0 | 8 | 0.035 | Qualified for the 2011 Cricket World Cup and the 2009–10 Intercontinental Cup and gained ODI Status for four years |
| 4 | Netherlands | 7 | 4 | 3 | 0 | 0 | 8 | 0.025 | Qualified for the 2011 Cricket World Cup and the 2009–10 Intercontinental Cup and gained ODI Status for four years |
| 5 | Scotland | 7 | 3 | 4 | 0 | 0 | 6 | −0.140 | Qualified for the 2009–10 Intercontinental Cup and gained ODI status for four years |
| 6 | Afghanistan | 7 | 3 | 4 | 0 | 0 | 6 | −0.209 | Qualified for the 2009–10 Intercontinental Cup and gained ODI status for four years |
| 7 | United Arab Emirates | 7 | 3 | 4 | 0 | 0 | 6 | −1.080 | Met in the 7th place playoff and relegated to World Cricket League Division Two for 2011 |
| 8 | Namibia | 7 | 2 | 5 | 0 | 0 | 4 | −0.079 | Met in the 7th place playoff and relegated to World Cricket League Division Two for 2011 |

11 April
(scorecard)

| Kenya; 181 all out (43.5 overs) | v | Canada; 185/3 (34.3 overs) |
| Jimmy Kamande 61 (86); Henry Osinde 4/39 (9 overs) | | Rizwan Cheema 49 (24); Jimmy Kamande 1/13 (3 overs) |

Canada won by 7 wickets
Willowmoore Park, Benoni
Umpires: Paul Baldwin and Marais Erasmus
Player of the match: Rizwan Cheema

11 April
(scorecard)

| Namibia; 280/7 (50 overs) | v | United Arab Emirates; 231/9 (50 overs) |
| Louis Burger 61 (60); Amjad Javed 2/27 (8 overs) | | Fayyaz Ahmed 53* (54); Louis Klazinga 3/44 (10) |

Namibia won by 49 runs
LC de Villiers Oval, Pretoria
Umpires: Buddhi Pradhan and Rod Tucker
Player of the match: Louis Burger

11 April
(scorecard)

| Afghanistan; 218/7 (50 overs) | v | Ireland; 196 all out (47.3 overs) |
| Raees Ahmadzai 50 (65); Andrew White 2/27 (10 overs) | | Andrew White 56 (64); Hameed Hasan 5/23 (9 overs) |

Afghanistan won by 22 runs
Stan Friedman Oval, Krugersdorp
Umpires: Ian Howell and Jeff Luck
Player of the match: Hameed Hasan

11 April
(scorecard)

| Scotland; 216/8 (50 overs) | v | Netherlands; 190 all out (48.4 overs) |
| Jan Stander 80* (82); Edgar Schiferli 4/37 (10 overs) | | Bas Zuiderent 67 (106); John Blain 5/45 (9.4 overs) |

Scotland won by 26 runs
Walter Milton Oval, University of the Witwatersrand, Johannesburg
Umpires: Kumar Dharmasena and Amiesh Saheba
Player of the match: Jan Stander

13 April
(scorecard)

| Namibia; 258/8 (50.0 overs) | v | Netherlands; 262/8 (47.1 overs) |
| Sarel Burger 51 (84); Peter Borren 3/59 (10 overs) | | Ryan ten Doeschate 134* (121); Gerrie Snyman 3/41 (10 overs) |

Netherlands won by 2 wickets
Willowmoore Park, Benoni
Umpires: Karl Hurter and Amish Saheba
Player of the match: Ryan ten Doeschate

13 April
(scorecard)

| Afghanistan; 267/8 (50.0 overs) | v | Canada; 268/4 (48.3 overs) |
| Noor Ali 122 (140); Rizwan Cheema 3/41 (10 overs) | | Ian Billcliff 96 (134); Khaleqdaad Noori 1/22 (7 overs) |

Canada won by 6 wickets
LC de Villiers Oval, Pretoria
Umpires: Enamul Hoque-Moni and Marais Erasmus
Player of the match: Ian Billcliff

13 April
(scorecard)

| Kenya; 178 all out (49.4 overs) | v | Scotland; 154 all out (47.2 overs) |
| Collins Obuya 32 (67); John Blain 4/59 (9 overs) | | Jan Stander 27 (68); Lameck Onyango 4/26 (9.2 overs) |

Kenya won by 24 runs
Stan Friedman Oval, Krugersdorp
Umpires: Rod Tucker and Ian Howell
Player of the match: Nehemiah Odhiambo

13 April
(scorecard)

| United Arab Emirates; 133 all out (39.5 overs) | v | Ireland; 134/2 (27.4 overs) |
| Fayyaz Ahmed 63 (65); Regan West 3/39 (8.5 overs) | | Gary Wilson 49 (76); Aman Ali 1/3 (2 overs) |

Ireland won by 8 wickets
Walter Milton Oval, University of the Witwatersrand, Johannesburg
Umpires: Gary Baxter and Sarika Prasad (SIN)
Player of the match: Fayyaz Ahmed

15 April
(scorecard)

| Afghanistan; 279 all out (50 overs) | v | Scotland; 237 all out (47.1 overs) |
| Karim Sadiq 92 (101); Craig Wright 2/41 (10 overs) | | Kyle Coetzer 91 (127); Shapoor Zadran 3/36 (9.1 overs) |

Afghanistan won by 42 runs
Willowmoore Park, Benoni
Umpires: Paul Baldwin and Ian Howell
Player of the match: Karim Sadiq

15 April
(scorecard)

| Netherlands; 222 all out (50 overs) | v | Ireland; 226/4 (44.3 overs) |
| Alexei Kervezee 77 (112); Alex Cusack 3/26 (6 overs) | | William Porterfield 78 (105); Edgar Schiferli 1/38 (10 overs) |

Ireland won by 6 wickets
LC de Villiers Oval, Pretoria
Umpires: Amish Saheba and Enamul Hoque-Moni
Player of the match: William Porterfield

15 April
(scorecard)

| Canada; 194 all out (49.5 overs) | v | United Arab Emirates; 200/5 (31.2 overs) |
| Sandeep Jyoti 43 (78); Saqib Ali (cricketer) 3/20 (10 overs) | | Khurram Khan 53 (59); Sandeep Jyoti 2/47 (8.2 overs) |

United Arab Emirates won by 5 wickets
Stan Friedman Oval, Krugersdorp
Umpires: Gary Baxter and Rod Tucker
Player of the match: Khurram Khan

15 April
(scorecard)

| Namibia; 305 all out (49.5 overs) | v | Kenya; 104 all out (30 overs) |
| Jan-Berrie Burger 125 (96); Lameck Onyango 3/68 (10 overs) | | Morris Ouma 27 (27); Sarel Burger 4/29 (9 overs) |

Namibia won by 201 runs
Walter Milton Oval, University of the Witwatersrand, Johannesburg
Umpires: Marais Erasmus and Kumar Dharmasena
Player of the match: Jan-Berrie Burger

17 April
(scorecard)

| Scotland; 299/7 (50 overs) | v | United Arab Emirates; 177 all out (39.4 overs) |
| Gavin Hamilton 127 (124); Qasim Zubair 3/62 (10 overs) | | Nithin Gopal 50 (72); Craig Wright 4/41 (10 overs) |

Scotland won by 122 runs
Willowmoore Park, Benoni
Umpires: Buddhi Pradhan and Amish Saheba
Player of the match: Gavin Hamilton

17 April
(scorecard)

| Ireland; 208/9 (50 overs) | v | Kenya; 209/4 (48 overs) |
| Niall O'Brien 59 (71); Steve Tikolo 3/11 (4 overs) | | Collins Obuya 66* (73); Regan West 2/40 (10 overs) |

Kenya won by 6 wickets
LC de Villiers Oval, Pretoria
Umpires: Marais Erasmus and Rod Tucker
Player of the match: Collins Obuya

17 April
(scorecard)

| Afghanistan; 243/7 (50.0 overs) | v | Namibia; 222 (48.3 overs) |
| Nowroz Mangal 78 (106); Sarel Burger 1/11 (5 overs) | | Gerrie Snyman 54 (93); Hamid Hassan 3/37 (9.3 overs) |

Afghanistan won by 21 runs
Stan Friedman Oval, Krugersdorp
Umpires: Karl Hurter and Sarika Prasad
Player of the match: Nowroz Mangal

17 April
(scorecard)

| Canada; 205/8 (50 overs) | v | Netherlands; 206/4 (47.1 overs) |
| Sandeep Jyoti 43 (63); Edgar Schiferli 2/47 (10 overs) | | Mudassar Bukhari 84 (114); Sunil Dhaniram 3/38 (10 overs) |

Netherlands won by 6 wickets
Walter Milton Oval, University of the Witwatersrand, Johannesburg
Umpires: Gary Baxter and Jeff Luck
Player of the match: Mudassar Bukhari

== Playoffs ==
=== 9th and 11th Place Playoffs ===
11 April
(scorecard)

| Uganda; 292/6 (50 overs) | v | Denmark; 230/8 (50 overs) |
| Nehal Bibodi 104* (104 balls); Bashir Shah 2/54 (9 overs) | | Mickey Lund 59 (91 balls); Akbar Baig 2/33 (10 overs) |

Uganda won by 62 runs
Fanie du Toit Sports Complex, Potchefstroom University
Umpires: Ian Ramage and Russell Tiffin
Player of the match: Nehal Bibodi

11 April
(scorecard)

| Oman; 254 (48.1 overs) | v | Bermuda; 256/2 (48.2 overs) |
| Sultan Ahmed 68 (87 balls); Rodney Trott 4/43 (10 overs) | | David Hemp 124* (125 balls); Haider Ali 1/33 (10 overs) |

Bermuda won by 8 wickets
Senwes Park, Potchefstroom
Umpires: Kevan Barbour and Karran Bayney
Player of the match: David Hemp

=== 11th place playoff ===
13 April
(scorecard)

| Denmark; 220 (48.2 overs) | v | Oman; 222/5 (41.4 overs) |
| Michael Pedersen 72 (92 balls); Hemal Mehta 5/29 (9.2 overs) | | Adnan Ilyas 89* (108 balls); David Borchersen 4/43 (8 overs) |

Oman won by 5 wickets
Fanie du Toit Sports Complex, Potchefstroom University
Umpires: Subhash Modi and Russell Tiffin
Player of the match: Adnan Ilyas

=== 9th place playoff ===
13 April
(scorecard)

| Uganda; 352/7 (50 overs) | v | Bermuda; 356/2 (48.3 overs) |
| Nehal Bibodi 109 (117 balls); Kyle Hodsoll 2/71 (10 overs) | | David Hemp 170* (141 balls); Frank Nsubuga 1/47 (6 overs) |

Bermuda won by 8 wickets
Senwes Park, Potchefstroom
Umpires: Niels Bagh and Kevan Barbour
Player of the match: David Hemp

=== 7th place playoff ===
19 April
(scorecard)

| Namibia; 267/9 (50 overs) | v | United Arab Emirates; 269/6 (41.3 overs) |
| Nicholaas Scholtz 54 (53); Fayyaz Ahmed 3/49 (10 overs) | | Khurram Khan 124 (120); Jan-Berrie Burger 2/28 (5 overs) |

United Arab Emirates won by 4 wickets
Stan Friedman Oval, Krugersdorp
Umpires: Paul Baldwin and Kumar Dharmasena
Player of the match: Khurram Khan

=== 5th place playoff ===
19 April
(scorecard)

| Afghanistan; 295/8 (50 overs) | v | Scotland; 206 all out (40 overs) |
| Mohammad Nabi 58 (64); John Blain 3/62 (9 overs) | | Kyle Coetzer 44 (46); Hamid Hassan 3/27 (7 overs) |

Afghanistan won by 89 runs
Willowmoore Park, Benoni
Umpires: Gary Baxter and Enamul Haque
Player of the match: Mohammad Nabi

=== 3rd place playoff ===
19 April
(scorecard)

| Kenya; 179 (43.1 overs) | v | Netherlands; 183/4 (32.1 overs) |
| Rajesh Bhudia 47 (54); Edgar Schiferli 4/23 (10 overs) | | Daan van Bunge 80 (88); Peter Ongondo 1/22 (6 overs) |

Netherlands won by 6 wickets
Senwes Park, Potchefstroom
Umpires: Ian Howell and Amish Saheba
Player of the match: Edgar Schiferli

== Final ==
19 April 2009
Scorecard

| Canada; 185 all out (48 overs) | v | Ireland; 188/1 (42.3 overs) |
| Umar Bhatti 46 (75); Trent Johnston 5/14 (10 overs) | | William Porterfield 104* (133); Sandeep Jyoti 1/26 (7 overs) |

Ireland won by 9 wickets
SuperSport Park, Centurion
Umpires: Marais Erasmus (SA) and Rod Tucker (Aus)
Player of the match: Trent Johnston (Ire)

== Final standings ==
| Position | Team | Status |
|---|---|---|
| 1st | Ireland | Qualified for the 2011 World Cup, the 2009–10 Intercontinental Cup and gained ODI status until 2014 |
| 2nd | Canada | Qualified for the 2011 World Cup, the 2009–10 Intercontinental Cup and gained ODI status until 2014 |
| 3rd | Netherlands | Qualified for the 2011 World Cup, the 2009–10 Intercontinental Cup and gained ODI status until 2014 |
| 4th | Kenya | Qualified for the 2011 World Cup, the 2009–10 Intercontinental Cup and gained ODI status until 2014 |
| 5th | Afghanistan | Qualified for the 2009–10 Intercontinental Cup and gained ODI status until 2014 |
| 6th | Scotland | Qualified for the 2009–10 Intercontinental Cup and gained ODI status until 2014 |
| 7th | United Arab Emirates | Relegated to Division Two and the 2009–10 Intercontinental Shield |
| 8th | Namibia | Relegated to Division Two and the 2009–10 Intercontinental Shield |
| 9th | Bermuda | Relegated to Division Two and the 2009–10 Intercontinental Shield |
| 10th | Uganda | Relegated to Division Two and the 2009–10 Intercontinental Shield |
| 11th | Oman | Relegated to 2011 Division Three. |
| 12th | Denmark | Relegated to 2011 Division Three. |

== Statistics ==
| Most Runs | | Most Wickets | |
|---|---|---|---|
| (Bermuda) David Hemp | 557 | (Netherlands) Edgar Schiferli | 24 |
| (Ireland) William Porterfield | 515 | (Afghanistan) Hameed Hasan | 18 |
| (Netherlands) Alexei Kervezee | 461 | (Scotland) John Blain | 17 |
| (Scotland) Neil McCallum | 452 | (Namibia) Louis Klazinga | 17 |
| (Scotland) Kyle Coetzer | 424 | (Scotland) Craig Wright | 16 |

== See also ==
- ICC World Cricket League
- 2011 Cricket World Cup
