= 2010 ACC Trophy Elite =

- Administrator: Asian Cricket Council
- Cricket format: 50 overs per side
- Tournament format: Round robin with playoffs
- Host: Kuwait
- Champions: Afghanistan (1st title)
- Participants: 10 teams
- Matches: 21
- Most runs: (United Arab Emirates) Saqib Ali (267)
- Most wickets: (Hong Kong) Nadeem Ahmed (17)
- Official website: Tournament home

The 2010 ACC Trophy Elite was a cricket tournament in Kuwait, taking place between March 31 and April 9, 2010. It gives Associate and Affiliate members of the Asian Cricket Council experience of international one-day cricket and also helps forms an essential part of regional rankings. The tournament was won by Afghanistan, who defeated Nepal by 95 runs in the final on April 9.

== Teams ==
After the 2006 ACC Trophy it was decided to split the tournament into two divisions. The placement of teams in the divisions was based on their final positions in the last ACC Trophy. The top ten teams went on to take part in the 2008 ACC Trophy Elite and the remaining teams were placed in a lower division, the 2009 ACC Trophy Challenge. Bottom two teams were relegated from 2008 ACC Trophy Elite and top two teams from 2009 ACC Trophy Challenge were promoted. The teams that made it into the Trophy Elite were:

- Hong Kong
- Kuwait
- Nepal
- Oman
- Singapore
- Afghanistan
- Bahrain
- Bhutan
- Malaysia
- United Arab Emirates

== Squads ==
Afghanistan	Bahrain	Bhutan	Hong Kong	Kuwait
Nawroz Mangal (C); Asghar Afghan; Dawlat Ahmadzai; Hamid Hassan; Karim Sadiq; Mirwais Ashraf; Mohammad Nabi; Mohammad Shahzad (wk); Nasratullah Nasrat; Noor Ali; Raees Ahmadzai; Samiullah Shenwari; Shabir Noori; Shapoor Zadran	Bahrain withdrew from the tournament after being unable to field a team due to visa problems.	Damber Gurung (C); Tshering Dorji; Kumar Subba; Kencho Norbu (wk); Sonam Tobgay; Phuntsho Wangdi; Dampo Dorji; Tandin Wangchuk; Lakshmi Kami; Sushil Luitel; Tshering Tashi; Dorji Loday; Sanjog Chhetri; Barun Wakhley	Najeeb Amar (C); Roy Lamsam; Moner Ahmed; Irfan Ahmed; Nadeem Ahmed; Waqas Barkat; Hussain Butt; Ilyas Gull; Aizaz Khan; Asif Khan; Nizakat Khan; Vikash Vaswani (wk); Nasir Hameed (wk); Jawaid Iqbal	Hashim Mirza (C); Khalid Butt; Lasantha Dimuthu; Saif Ullah; Muhammad Amin; Nikhil Kulkarni; Saud Iqbal; Muhammad Javed; Saad Khalid; Nalaka Dayan; Muhammad Murad; Muhammad Akhudzada (wk); Khalid Yamin; Haroon Shahid

Malaysia	Nepal	Oman	Singapore	United Arab Emirates
Suhan Alagaratnam (C); Ahmed Faiz; Faris Almas; Rakesh Madhavan; Damith Warusavithana; Suresh Navaratnam; Anwar Arudin; Eszrafiq Azis; Shukri Rahim; Nik Arifin; Shafiq Sharif (wk); Hassan Ghulam; Norwira Rahim; Shahrulnizam Yusof	Paras Khadka (C); Mehboob Alam; Binod Bhandari; Amrit Bhattarai; Dipendra Chaudhary; Mahesh Chhetri (wk); Binod Das; Shakti Gauchan; Gyanendra Malla; Anil Mandal; Basanta Regmi; Sanjam Regmi; Sharad Vesawkar; Rahul Vishwakarma	Sultan Ahmed (C) (wk); Rafeeq Al-Balushi; Yousuf Mahmood; Sufyan Mahmood; Hemin Desai; Adnan Ilyas (wk); Vaibhav Wategaonkar; Zeeshan Siddiqui; Awal Khan; Khalid Rasheed; Aamer Ali; Nileshkumar Parmar; Tariq Hussain; Aamir Khaleem	Munish Arora (C); Mohammad Ali; Narender Reddy; Chetan Suryawanshi (wk); Shoib Razak; Mulewa Dharmichand; Pramodh Raja; Buddhika Mendis; Saad Janjua; Sagar Kulkarni; Irfan Madakia; Varun Varman; Manbhir Singh; Phil Childs	Khurram Khan (C); Naeemuddin Aslam; Arshad Ali; Saqib Ali; Abdul Rehman (wk); Shadeep Silva; Amjad Ali (wk); Salman Farooq; Ahmed Raza; Qassim Zubair; Shoaib Sarwar; Fayyaz Ahmed; Qadar Nawaz; Indika Sampath (wk)

== Group stages ==
=== Group A ===
Pos	Team	Pld	W	L	T	NR	Pts	NRR
1	Nepal	4	4	0	0	0	8	1.592
2	Hong Kong	4	3	1	0	0	6	−0.030
3	Oman	4	2	2	0	0	4	−0.049
4	Kuwait	4	1	3	0	0	2	−0.852
5	Singapore	4	0	4	0	0	0	−0.789

31 March 2010
(scorecard)

Kuwait; 252 (49.4 overs)	v	Singapore; 249/9 (50 overs)
Saad Khalid 68 (44); Mulewa Dharmichand 3/40 (10 overs)		Munish Arora 90 (103); Muhammad Amin 4/17 (5 overs)

Kuwait won by 3 runs
Doha Entertainment City Ground, Kuwait City
Umpires: L. Hariharan & Syed Kazmi
Player of the match: Munish Arora (Singapore)

31 March 2010
(scorecard)

Nepal; 236/7 (50 overs)	v	Hong Kong; 118 (33.4 overs)
Anil Mandal 72 (96); Nadeem Ahmed 3/51 (10 overs)		Ilyas Gull 27 (29); Mehboob Alam 3/33 (7 overs)

Nepal won by 118 runs
Kuwait Oil Company Unity Ground, Kuwait City
Umpires: Irfan Adil & Younis Rasheed
Player of the match: Anil Mandal (Nepal)

1 April 2010
(scorecard)

Singapore; 173 (47.5 overs)	v	Oman; 174/2 (33.5 overs)
Munish Arora 43 (103); Awal Khan 4/29 (9.5 overs)		Vaibhav Wategaonkar 60 (74); Saad Janjua 1/38 (8 overs)

Oman won by 8 wickets
Kuwait Oil Company Hubara Ground, Kuwait City
Umpires: Imran Idress & Syed Kazmi
Player of the match: Awal Khan (Oman)

2 April 2010
(scorecard)

Kuwait; 202 (49.5 overs)	v	Hong Kong; 203/7 (43.5 overs)
Lasantha Dimuthu 51 (111); Ilyas Gul 4/33 (9 overs)		Hussain Butt 82 (117); Khalid Butt 1/21 (7 overs)

Hong Kong won by 6 wickets
Kuwait Oil Company Hubara Ground, Kuwait City
Umpires: L. Hariharan & Imran Idress
Player of the match: Hussain Butt (Hong Kong)

2 April 2010
(scorecard)

Oman; 169/9 (50 overs)	v	Nepal; 172/4 (38.3 overs)
Vaibhav Wategaonkar 56 (104); Rahul Vishvakarma 3/32 (8 overs)		Anil Mandal 39 (45); Aamer Ali 3/48 (10 overs)

Nepal won by 6 wickets
Kuwait Oil Company Unity Ground, Kuwait City
Umpires: Riaz Chaudhry & Irfan Adil
Player of the match: Paras Khadka (Nepal)

3 April 2010
(scorecard)

Singapore; 216 (49 overs)	v	Nepal; 217/3 (43.2 overs)
Phil Childs 40 (51); Shakti Gauchan 2/26 (5 overs)		Mahesh Chhetri 87 (111); Pramodh Raja 1/21 (7 overs)

Nepal won by 7 wickets
Doha Entertainment City Ground, Kuwait City
Umpires: Imran Mustafa & Younus Rasheed
Player of the match: Mahesh Chhetri (Nepal)

4 April 2010
(scorecard)

Hong Kong; 194 (46.2 overs)	v	Singapore; 149 (44 overs)
Moner Ahmed 44 (44); Narender Reddy 4/28 (8.2 overs)		Monish Arora 52 (70); Nadeem Ahmed 5/35 (9 overs)

Hong Kong won by 45 runs
Sulabiya Ground, Kuwait City
Umpires: Fareed Dalwai & Imran Mustafa
Player of the match: Nadeem Ahmed (Hong Kong)

4 April 2010
(scorecard)

Kuwait; 247 (49.5 overs)	v	Oman; 249/5 (40.2 overs)
Khalid Butt 55 (44); Deep Trivedi 4/36 (8.5 overs)		Adnan Ilyas 82* (84); Haroon Shahid 2/35 (3.2 overs)

Oman won by 5 wickets
Kuwait Oil Company Unity Ground, Kuwait City
Umpires: F. Malik & Younis Rasheed
Player of the match: Deep Trividi & Adnan Ilyas (both Oman)

6 April 2010
(scorecard)

Oman; 168 (39 overs)	v	Hong Kong; 169/9 (38.5 overs)
Deep Trividi 54 (98); Moner Ahmed 4/19 (7 overs)		Nizakat Khan 57 (72); Tariq Hussain 3/41 (8 overs)

Hong Kong won by 1 wicket
Doha Entertainment City Ground, Kuwait City
Umpires: Irfan Adil & Imran Mustafa
Player of the match: Nizakat Khan (Hong Kong)

6 April 2010
(scorecard)

Kuwait; 120 (42 overs)	v	Nepal; 121/2 (26.4 overs)
Saud Iqbal 26 (48); Sanjam Regmi 4/26 (9 overs)		Mahesh Chhetri 63 (83); Saud Iqbal 1/8 (1 over)

Nepal won by 8 wickets
Kuwait Oil Company Hubara Ground, Kuwait City
Umpires: R. Srinivasan & T Mahmood
Player of the match: Sanjam Regmi (Nepal)

=== Group B ===
Pos	Team	Pld	W	L	T	NR	Pts	NRR
1	Afghanistan	4	3	1	0	0	6	2.600
2	Malaysia	4	3	1	0	0	6	2.512
3	United Arab Emirates	4	3	1	0	0	6	2.392
4	Bhutan	4	1	3	0	0	2	−8.498
5	Bahrain (Note: Bahrain were forced to withdraw from the tournament after being unable to field a team due to visa problems.)	4	0	4	0	0	0	—

Notes:

31 March 2010
(scorecard)

Afghanistan; 471/5 (50 overs)	v	Bhutan; 78 (32.5 overs)
Asghar Afghan 151 (83); Phuntsho Wangdi 2/78 (9 overs)		Kumar Subba 41 (103); Hameed Hasan 6/18 (7.5 overs)

Afghanistan won by 393 runs
Kuwait Oil Company Hubara Ground, Kuwait City
Umpires: John Saloman & R. Srinivasan
Player of the match: Asghar Stanikzai (Afghanistan)

1 April 2010
(scorecard)

United Arab Emirates; 510/6 (50 overs)	v	Bhutan; 76 (32.2 overs)
Saqib Ali 140 (90); Sonam Tobgay 2/82 (7 overs)		Damber Gurung 25 (47); Shadeep Silva 3/13 (6.2 overs)

United Arab Emirates won by 434 runs
Kuwait Oil Company Unity Ground, Kuwait City
Umpires: John Saloman & Younis Rasheed
Player of the match: Saqib Ali (UAE)

2 April 2010
(scorecard)

Afghanistan; 217/7 (50 overs)	v	United Arab Emirates; 218/8 (49.1 overs)
Raees Ahmadzai 56 (100); Shadeep Silva 3/29 (9 overs)		Saqib Ali 93* (103); Shapoor Zadran 3/28 (7 overs)

United Arab Emirates won by 2 wickets
Doha Entertainment City Ground, Kuwait City
Umpires: Naresh D'Souza & Farid Malik
Player of the match: Saqib Ali (UAE)

3 April 2010
(scorecard)

Afghanistan; 236/9 (50 overs)	v	Malaysia; 235 (49.5 overs)
Raees Ahmadzai 64* (59); Nik Arifin 2/38 (9 overs)		Suhan Alagaratnam 61 (73); Hameed Hasan 5/44 (10 overs)

Afghanistan won by 1 run
Kuwait Oil Company Hubara Ground, Kuwait City
Umpires: Riaz Chaudhry & John Salomon
Player of the match: Hameed Hasan (Afghanistan)

4 April 2010
(scorecard)

Bhutan; 68 (23.3 overs)	v	Malaysia; 71/0 (5.2 overs)
Damber Gurung 10 (19); Ghulam Mustafa 4/18 (7.3 overs)		Damith Warusavithana 53* (21)

Malaysia won by 10 wickets
Doha Entertainment City Ground, Kuwait City
Umpires: Naresh D'Souza & M. Irfan Adil
Player of the match: Damith Warusavithana (Malaysia)

6 April 2010
(scorecard)

United Arab Emirates; 152 (41 overs)	v	Malaysia; 153/8 (27.1 overs)
Salman Farooq 40 (63); Suresh Navaratnam 4/29 (10 overs)		Suhan Kumar 65 (65); Shoaib Sarwar 2/21 (4 overs)

Malaysia won by 2 wickets
Kuwait Oil Company Unity Ground, Kuwait City
Umpires: Fareed Dalwai & Naresh D'Souza
Player of the match: Suhan Kumar (Malaysia)

== Play-offs ==
=== 9th place play-off ===
8 April
(scorecard)

Singapore	v	Bahrain

Singapore won by a walkover
Doha Entertainment City Ground, Kuwait City

- Bahrain were unable to field a team due to visa problems

=== 7th place play-off ===
7 April
(scorecard)

Bhutan; 131 (43 overs)	v	Kuwait; 132/0 (11.5 overs)
Sonam Tobgay 48 (62); Muhammad Javed 3/31 (10 overs)		Khalid Butt 85 (37)

Kuwait won by 10 wickets
Doha Entertainment City Ground, Kuwait City
Umpires: Srinivasan Adachani & Younis Rasheed
Player of the match: Khalid Butt (Kuwait)

=== 5th place play-off ===
8 April
(scorecard)

United Arab Emirates; 265 (48.3 overs)	v	Oman; 193/3 (32.3 overs)
Khurram Khan 90 (71); Tariq Hussain 3/50 (10 overs)		Vaibhav Wategaonkar 65* (76); Qasim Zubair 2/35 (6 overs)

Oman won by 34 runs (D/L)
Kuwait Oil Company Unity Ground, Kuwait City
Umpires: Fareed Dalwai & Imran Mustafa
Player of the match: Vaibhav Wategaonkar (UAE)

=== 3rd place play-off ===
9 April
(scorecard)

Hong Kong; 251/6 (50 overs)	v	Malaysia; 244/8 (50 overs)
Ilyas Gul 75 (102); Sharulnizam Yusof 2/35 (10 overs)		Rakesh Madhavan 129 (137); Najeeb Amar 3/34 (10 overs)

Hong Kong won by 7 runs
Kuwait Oil Company Unity Ground, Kuwait City
Umpires: Naresh D'Souza & Irfan Adil
Player of the match: Nizakat Khan (Hong Kong)

== Semi-finals ==
7 April
(scorecard)

Hong Kong; 205 (48.1 overs)	v	Afghanistan; 210/5 (44.4 overs)
Hussain Butt 63 (113); Mohammad Nabi 3/30 (9.1 overs)		Asghar Afghan 55* (93); Nadeem Ahmed 2/29 (10 overs)

Afghanistan won by 5 wickets
Kuwait Oil Company Unity Ground, Kuwait City
Umpires: T. Mahmood & John Saloman
Player of the match: Mohammad Nabi (Afghanistan)

7 April
(scorecard)

Nepal; 271/6 (50 overs)	v	Malaysia; 263 (49.4 overs)
Sharad Vesawkar 97* (66); Shahrulnizam Yusof 2/48 (10 overs)		Suresh Navaratnam 115 (103); Paras Khadka 2/42 (10 overs)

Nepal won by 8 runs
Kuwait Oil Company Hubara Ground, Kuwait City
Umpires: R. Chaudhary & F. Malik
Player of the match: Suresh Navaratnam (Malaysia)

== Final ==
9 April
(scorecard)

Afghanistan; 224 (50 overs)	v	Nepal; 129 (40 overs)
Karim Sadiq 58 (105); Binod Das 3/35 (8 overs)		Sharad Vesawkar 35 (60); Nawroz Mangal 2/9 (3 overs)

Afghanistan won by 95 runs
Kuwait Oil Company Hubara Ground, Kuwait City
Umpires: Fareed Dalwai & John Saloman
Player of the match: Raees Ahmadzai (Afghanistan)

== Final Placings ==
Pos	Team	Relegation
1st	Afghanistan	
2nd	Nepal	
3rd	Hong Kong	
4th	Malaysia	
5th	Oman	
6th	United Arab Emirates	
7th	Kuwait	
8th	Bhutan	Qualified for WCL82012
9th	Singapore	Relegated to ACC Trophy Challenge Division
10th	Bahrain	Relegated to ACC Trophy Challenge Division

== Statistics ==
Most runs		Most wickets	
(United Arab Emirates) Saqib Ali	267	(Hong Kong) Nadeem Ahmed	17
(Afghanistan) Karim Sadiq	261	(Afghanistan) Hameed Hasan	16
(Afghanistan) Asghar Afghan	253	(Hong Kong) Munir Dar	11
(Oman) Vaibbhav Wategaonkar	238	(Malaysia) Suresh Navaratnam	10
(Nepal) Anil Mandal	236	(Malaysia) Sharul Nizam	9

== Controversy ==
The tournament was beset with players struggling to get visas to gain access to Kuwait. Bahrain were forced to withdraw from the tournament as they were unable to field a team after a large number of their players were refused visas.

Mohammad Nabi, the Afghanistan all-rounder was refused as visa, as was Hong Kong captain Najeeb Amar. Both were later able to gain entry to Kuwait and take part in the later stages of the tournament.

The Cricket Association of Nepal President Binay Raj Pandey has said his board intends to raise the issue at the next meeting of the Asian Cricket Council after Nepal vice-captain Gyanendra Malla had been refused entry to the country. In response to this, Pandey intends to ask the ACC not to host future tournaments in countries where obtaining a visa is difficult.
