= 2009 ACC Trophy Challenge =

- Administrator: Asian Cricket Council
- Cricket format: 50 over cricket
- Tournament format(s): Round robin and playoffs
- Host: Thailand
- Champions: Oman (1st title)
- Participants: 8
- Matches: 18
- Most runs: (Oman) Adnan Ilyas 282
- Most wickets: (Bhutan) Dampo Dorji 13
- Official website: Tournament home

The 2009 ACC Trophy Challenge was a cricket tournament in Chiang Mai, Thailand, taking place between 12 and 21 January 2009. It gave Associate and Affiliate members of the Asian Cricket Council experience of international one-day cricket and also formed part of the regional qualifications for the ICC World Cricket League. The top 2 teams were promoted to the ACC Trophy Elite Division. Bhutan also qualified for the WCL82010

== Teams ==
After the 2006 ACC Trophy a decision was made to split the tournament into two divisions. The placement of teams in these divisions was determined by the final rankings in the previous tournament. The top ten teams went into the 2008 ACC Trophy Elite with the remaining teams taking part in the 2009 ACC Trophy Challenge. They were also joined by China who had not previously taken part in the tournament.

Qualified through participation in 2006 ACC Trophy:

- Bhutan
- Brunei
- Iran
- Maldives
- Myanmar
- Oman
- Thailand

Newcomers to the ACC Trophy:

- China

== Squads ==
Bhutan	Brunei	China	Iran
Tshering Dorji (Captain); Jigme Singye; Thinley Jamtsho; Dilip Subba; Sonam Tobgay; Phuntsho Wangdi; Tandin Wangchuk; Lobzang Yonten; Dorji; Kumar Subba; Kencho Norbu; Dampo; Thinley Tenzin; Jigme Norbu (Manager); Damber Gurung (Coach)	Sujaya Kamat (Captain); Manzur Ahmed; Muhamad Aleem; Shorin Khan; Basil George; Sreejith Kallumpurath; Muhammed Alaudeen; Samantha Weerakoon; Rabeek Abbas; Jahaber Kiyasudeen; Kamalan Muneeswaran; Sinnathurai Induraj; Arafat Mahabub; Abdul Gaffoor; Haji Mosli Mohamad (Manager); Manzur Ahmed (Coach)	Zhao Yang (Captain); Guo Fengfeng; Wang Ronggang; Dong Chao; Wang Lei; Zhang Xinliang; Fu Xianchao; He Nengxing; Ai Di; Jiang Shuyao; Zhang Peng; Li Jian; Zhang Yufei; Zhong Wenyi; Zhang Tian (Manager); Rashid Khan (Coach)	Nariman Bakhtiar (Captain); Atnan Zehi; Ebrahim Badrouzeh; Shoeyb Khorsand; Yahya Sheikhi; Rashed Bameri; Abdolvahab Ebrahimipour; Alireza Shatrang; Shirmohammad Balouchnezhad; Liaghat-Ali Narouie; Yousef Raeisi; Loghman Sheikhi; Zaven Babakhani; Dadkhoda Shahouzehi (Manager); Armond Nahabedian (Coach)

Maldives	Myanmar	Oman	Thailand
Moosa Kaleem (Captain); Afzal Faiz; Abdulla Shahid; Abdulla Shafeeu; Neesham Nasir; Ismail Nihad; Mahafooz Mohamed; Husham Ibrahim; Ahmed Hussain; Mihusan Hamid; Hassan Ibrahim; Ahmed Hussein; Shafraz Jaleel; Muviath Ghanee; Ali Manik (Manager); Hemal Mendis (Coach)	Ye Myo Tun (Captain); Aye Min Than; Sai Sai Wunna; Thaw Zin; San Thein; Myat Min Hein; Win Maw; Zaw Htoo; Maung Maung Win; Naung Hhlaing Tun; Myo Win; Kyaw Ze Za; Ye Min Soe; Aung Aung; Than Win (Manager); Michael Moosajee (Coach)	Hemal Mehta (Captain); Sultan Ahmed; Adnan Ilyas; Nileshkumar Parmar; Vaibhav Wategaonkar; Awal Khan; Farhan Khan; Aamer Ali; Haider Ali; Masqood Hussain; Ameet Sampat; Khalid Al-Balushi; Khalid Rasheed; Qaim Hussain; Madhu Jesrani (Manager); Mazhar Khan (Coach)	Zeeshan Khan (Captain); John Hottinger; Noppon Sennamontree; Thanatit Jeerapanthawong; Anil Tanwani; Ashish Dey; Deepak Saraff; Akshay Desai; Nishadh Rego; Shyam Sideek; Vishal Pathkar; Shishir Turilay; Shaik Cader; Shreyanshu Tewari

Match Officials
Ramani Batumalai (Malaysia)
Koo Chai Huat (Malaysia)
Upul Kaluhetti (Thailand)
Mohammed Kamrulzzaman (Thailand)
Ashwin Kumar Rana (Thailand)
K.G. Srinivasan (Singapore)

== Group stage ==
=== Points Tables ===
Green denotes teams going into the semifinals. Yellow denotes teams that play in the fifth place playoff and remain in the ACC Trophy Challenge Division. Red denotes teams that play in the seventh place playoff and remain in the ACC Trophy Challenge Division.

==== Group A ====
Team	Pld	W	T	L	NR	Pts	NRR
Oman	3	3	0	0	0	6	+6.81
Bhutan	3	2	0	1	0	4	+0.41
Brunei	3	1	0	2	0	2	−0.90
Myanmar	3	0	0	3	0	0	−3.76

==== Group B ====
Team	Pld	W	T	L	NR	Pts	NRR
Thailand	3	3	0	0	0	6	+1.88
Maldives	3	2	0	1	0	4	+3.27
Iran	3	1	0	2	0	2	+0.67
China	3	0	0	3	0	0	−6.29

=== Fixtures and results ===
12 January 2009
scorecard

Bhutan; 111 all out (33.4 overs)	v	Oman; 112/2 (13.1 overs)
Thinley Jamtsho 38 (69); Farhan Khan 3–19 (7 overs)		Adnan Ilyas 50 (36); Lobzang Yonten 1–33 (3 overs)

Oman won by 8 wickets
Prem Oval, Chiang Mai
Umpires: M Kamrulzzaman (Thailand) and AK Rana (Thailand)
Player of the match: Hemal Mehta (Oman)

12 January 2009
scorecard

Thailand; 165 all out (49 overs)	v	Maldives; 159 all out (47.5 overs)
Nishadh Rego 62 (123); Abdulla Shahid 3–13 (10 overs)		Afzal Faiz 37 (69); Ashish Dey 3–34 (10 overs)

Thailand won by 6 runs
Gymkhana Club, Chiang Mai

13 January 2009
scorecard

Myanmar; 152/9 (50 overs)	v	Brunei; 156/3 (32.2 overs)
Ye Myo Tun 20 (78); Jahaber Kiyasudeen 3–23 (9 overs)		Basil George 36* (60); Aung Aung 1–18 (5 overs)

Brunei won by 7 wickets
Prem Oval, Chiang Mai

13 January 2009
scorecard

Iran; 369/6 (50 overs)	v	China; 62 all out (23.3 overs)
Nariman Bakhtiar 120 (66); Dong Chao 2–60 (8 overs)		Dong Chao 16 (47); Abdolvahab Ebrahimpour 2–7 (4 overs)

Iran won by 307 runs
Gymkhana Club, Chiang Mai
Umpires: U Kaluhetti (Thailand) and AK Rama (Thailand)
Player of the match: Shirmohammad Balouchnezhad (Iran)

14 January 2009
scorecard

Iran; 79 all out (35 overs)	v	Maldives; 80/2 (16 overs)
Shirmohammad Balouchnezhad 17 (36); Mohamed Mahfooz 4–6 (6 overs)		Moosa Kaleem 24* (29); Nariman Bakhtiar 2–26 (7 overs)

Maldives won by 8 wickets
Prem Oval, Chiang Mai
Umpires: U Kaluhetti (Thailand) and M Kamrulzzaman (Thailand)
Player of the match: Mohamed Mahfooz (Maldives)

14 January 2009
scorecard

Brunei; 204/9 (50 overs)	v	Bhutan; 205/3 (41.2 overs)
Sinnathurai Induraj 90 (86); Lobzang Yonten 3–22 (10 overs)		Kencho Norbu 50 (75); Shorin Khan 1–36 (9 overs)

Bhutan won by 7 wickets
Gymkhana Club, Chiang Mai

15 January 2009
scorecard

China; 39 all out (12.2 overs)	v	Thailand; 40/2 (6.3 overs)
Wang Ronggang 8 (4); Noppon Senamontree 4–21 (4.2 overs)		John Hottinger 14 (11); Zhang Yufei 1–11 (3.3 overs)

Thailand won by 8 wickets
Prem Oval, Chiang Mai
Umpires: KC Huat (Malaysia) and R Batumalai (Malaysia)
Player of the match: Noppon Senamontree (Thailand)

15 January 2009
scorecard

Myanmar; 12 all out (15.3 overs)	v	Oman; 14/0 (2.2 overs)
Ye Min Soe 3 (33); Adnan Ilyas 3–1 (1.3 overs)		Nilesh Parmar 7* (12)

Oman won by 10 wickets
Gymkhana Club, Chiang Mai

16 January 2009
scorecard

Brunei; 131 all out (42 overs)	v	Oman; 132/1 (14.5 overs)
Jahaber Kiyasudeen 42 (62); Farhan Khan 3–17 (9 overs)		Adnan Ilyas 89* (51); Sinnathurai Induraj 1–38 (5 overs)

Oman won by 9 wickets
Prem Oval, Chiang Mai
Umpires: U Kaluhetti (Thailand) and M Kamrulzzaman (Thailand)
Player of the match: Adnan Ilyas (Oman)

16 January 2009
scorecard

Thailand; 230 all out (49.1 overs)	v	Iran; 133 all out (42.4 overs)
Zeeshan Khan 63 (65); Atnan Zehi 3–31 (7 overs)		Nariman Bakhtiar 40 (52); Ashish Dey 3–18 (9 overs)

Thailand won by 97 runs
Gymkhana Club, Chiang Mai
Umpires: KC Huat (Malaysia) and KG Srinivasan (Singapore)
Player of the match: Zeeshan Khan (Thailand)

17 January 2009
scorecard

Maldives; 376/7 (50 overs)	v	China; 61 all out (32.2 overs)
Afzal Faiz 93 (62); Li Jian 3–57 (10 overs)		Wang Ronggang 21 (49); Ismail Nahid 6–10 (10 overs)

Maldives won by 315 runs
Prem Oval, Chiang Mai
Umpires: R Batumalai (Malaysia) and KG Srinivasan (Singapore)

17 January 2009
scorecard

Myanmar; 64 all out (28.4 overs)	v	Bhutan; 65/2 (9.5 overs)
Kyaw Ze Ya 10 (18); Dampo 6–17 (9.4 overs)		Dorji 24* 29; Aye Min Than 1–22 (3 overs)

Bhutan won by 8 wickets
Gymkhana Club, Chiang Mai

== Semifinals ==
Winners of the semifinals were promoted to the ACC Trophy Elite Division and qualified for the final.

19 January 2009
scorecard

Oman; 240 all out (49.4 overs)	v	Maldives; 138 all out (39.1 overs)
Sultan Ahmed 95* (115); Hassan Ibrahim 4–29 (10 overs)		Shafraz Jaleel 25 (38); Amir Ali 3–4 (4.1 overs)

Oman won by 102 runs
Prem Oval, Chiang Mai
Umpires: M Kamruzzaman (Thailand) and AK Rana (Thailand)
Player of the match: Sultan Ahmed (Oman)

19 January 2009
scorecard

Bhutan; 164 all out (48.4 overs)	v	Thailand; 72 all out (25.2 overs)
Kencho Norbu 45 (135); Zeeshan Khan 2–29 (9 overs)		Anil Tanwani 20 (52); Dampo 5–29 (8.2 overs)

Bhutan won by 92 runs
Gymkhana Club, Chiang Mai

- Bhutan qualified for WCL8 as a result of this match.

== Final and Playoffs ==
20 January 2009
scorecard

China; 181 all out (39.3 overs)	v	Myanmar; 63 all out (20.3 overs)
Li Jian 32 (43); Aye Min Than 4–54 (9.3 overs)		Aye Min Than 19 (40); Li Jian 4–16 (4.3 overs)

China won by 118 runs
Gymkhana Club, Chiang Mai
Umpires: U Kaluhetti (Thailand) and M Kamruzzaman (Thailand)
Player of the match: Li Jian (China)

- 7th Place Playoff

20 January 2009
scorecard

Iran; 274/9 (50 overs)	v	Brunei; 222 all out (46.2 overs)
Shirmohammed Balouchnezhad 74 (79); Abdul Gaffoor 2–24 (4 overs)		Sujay Kamat 40 (54); Loghman Sheikhi 4–33 (10 overs)

Iran won by 52 runs
Prem Oval, Chiang Mai
Umpires: R Batumalai (Malaysia) and KC Huat (Malaysia)
Player of the match: Shirmohammad Balouchnezhad (Iran)

- 5th Place Playoff

21 January 2009
scorecard

Thailand; 60 all out (33.3 overs)	v	Maldives; 62/2 (15 overs)
Shyam Sideek 14 (33); Abdulla Shahid 4–13 (10 overs)		Ahmed Hassan 26* (41); Ashish Dey 1–10 (2 overs)

Maldives won by 8 wickets
Gymkhana Club, Chiang Mai

- 3rd Place Playoff

21 January 2009
scorecard

Oman; 322/9 (50 overs)	v	Bhutan; 109 all out (42.1 overs)
Adnan Ilyas 138 (118); Lobzang Yonten 2–56 (10 overs)		Kumar Subba 40 (103); Hemal Mehta 3–22 (10 overs)

Oman won by 213 runs
Prem Oval, Chiang Mai
Umpires: M Kamruzzaman (Thailand) and AK Rana (Thailand)
Player of the match: Adnan Ilyas (Oman)

- Final

== Final Placings ==
Pos	Team	Promotion/Relegation
1st	Oman	Promoted to ACC Trophy Elite Division
2nd	Bhutan	Qualified for 2010 ICC World Cricket League Division Eight
3rd	Maldives	Remain in ACC Trophy Challenge Division
4th	Thailand	Remain in ACC Trophy Challenge Division
5th	Iran	Remain in ACC Trophy Challenge Division
6th	Brunei	Remain in ACC Trophy Challenge Division
7th	China	Remain in ACC Trophy Challenge Division
8th	Myanmar	Remain in ACC Trophy Challenge Division
