= 2010 Associates Twenty20 Series in Kenya =

- Date: 30 January 2010 – 4 February 2010
- Location: Kenya
- Result: Kenya won the tournament
Teams
Kenya	Scotland	Uganda
Captains
Morris Ouma	Gavin Hamilton	Akbar Baig Davis Arinaitwe
Most runs
David Obuya (167) Steve Tikolo (165) Collins Obuya (79)	Fraser Watts (99); Kyle Coetzer (91); Jan Stander (70)	Roger Mukasa (96); Akbar Baig (75); Arthur Kyobe (71)
Most wickets
Nehemiah Odhiambo (7) Nelson Odhiambo (6) James Kamande (5)	Ross Lyons & Majid Haq (4); Gordon Drummond (3)	Davis Arinaitwe (4); Henry Ssenyondo & Frank Nsubuga (3)

2010 Associates Twenty20 Series in Kenya was a tournament of Twenty20 cricket matches that were held in Kenya from 30 January to 4 February 2010. The three participating teams were Kenya, Scotland and Uganda. The matches were played at the Gymkhana Club Ground in Nairobi. Kenya won the series, after winning all four of their round robin matches.

== Squads ==
Kenya	Scotland	Uganda
Morris Ouma (Captain/Wicketkeeper); Jimmy Kamande; Shem Obado; Alex Obanda; Collins Obuya; David Obuya; Nehemiah Odhiambo; Nelson Odhiambo; Lameck Onyango; Elijah Otieno; Rakep Patel; Tony Suji; Steve Tikolo; Hiren Varaiya; Seren Waters	Gavin Hamilton (Captain); Richie Berrington; Kyle Coetzer; Gordon Drummond; Gordon Goudie; Majid Haq; Ross Lyons; Neil McCallum; Dewald Nel; Navdeep Poonia; Simon Smith (Wicketkeeper); Jan Stander; Ryan Watson	Akbar Baig (Captain); Davis Arinaitwe (Vice-Captain); Asadu Seiga; Fred Isabirye; Arthur Kyobe; Deusdedit Muhumuza; Roger Mukasa (Wicketkeeper); Benjamin Musoke; Frank Nsubuga; Raymond Otim; Jonathan Ssebanja; Lawrence Sematimba; Ronald Ssemanda; Henry Ssenyondo; Dennis Tabby; Ivan Thawithemwira; Charles Waiswa; Arthur Ziraba

== Points table ==
Pos	Team	Pld	W	L	T	NR	Pts	NRR
1	Kenya	4	4	0	0	0	8	1.946
2	Scotland	4	2	2	0	0	4	−0.446
3	Uganda	4	0	4	0	0	0	−1.177

== Matches ==
=== 1st match ===
30 January 2010
Scorecard

Uganda; 123/9 (20 overs)	v	Kenya; 127/2 (17.2 overs)
Roger Mukasa 23 (14); Akbar Baig 23 (31); Hiren Varaiya 2/9 (4 overs)		Steve Tikolo 63 (44); Deusdedit Muhumuza 1/23 (3.2)

Kenya won by 8 wickets
Gymkhana Club Ground, Nairobi, Kenya
Umpires: Rockie D'Mello and Subhash Modi (both KEN)

- Points: Kenya 2, Uganda 0.
- Toss Kenya, who chose to field

=== 2nd match ===
31 January 2010
Scorecard

Scotland; 109/8 (20 overs)	v	Uganda; 109 (20 overs)
Jan Stander 25 (20); Henry Ssenyondo 3/20 (4 overs)		Arthur Kyobe 51* (54); Ross Lyons 3/28 (4)

Match tied (Scotland won the eliminator)
Gymkhana Club Ground, Nairobi, Kenya
Umpires: Lalji Bhudia and Munir Khan (both KEN)

- Points: Scotland 2, Uganda 0.
- Toss: Scotland, who chose to bat

=== 3rd match ===
1 February 2010
Scorecard

Scotland; 109/9 (20 overs)	v	Kenya; 110/0 (12.3 overs)
Majid Haq 21* (20); Jimmy Kamande 4/28 (3)		David Obuya 60* (48)

Kenya won by 10 wickets
Gymkhana Club Ground, Nairobi, Kenya
Umpires: Rockie D'Mello and Isaac Oyieko

- Points: Kenya 2, Scotland 0.
- Toss Kenya, who chose to field.

=== 4th match ===
2 February 2010
Scorecard

Kenya; 186/3 (20 overs)	v	Uganda; 172/9 (20 overs)
Collins Obuya 79* (45); Davis Arinaitwe 1/12 (4 overs)		Roger Mukasa 66 (41); Nelson Odhiambo 4/25 (4 overs)

Kenya won by 14 runs
Gymkhana Club Ground, Nairobi, Kenya
Umpires: Lalji Bhudia and Naresh Shah (both KEN)

- Points: Kenya 2, Uganda 0.
- Toss: Uganda who chose to field.

=== 5th match ===
3 February 2010
Scorecard

Scotland; 163/4 (20 overs)	v	Uganda; 107/9 (20 overs)
Fraser Watts 73 (44); Davis Arinaitwe 2/18 (3 overs)		Akbar Baig 38 (33); Dewald Nel 2/12 (4 overs)

Scotland won by 56 runs
Gymkhana Club Ground, Nairobi, Kenya
Umpires: Munir Khan and Isaac Oyieko (both KEN)

- Points: Scotland 2, Uganda 0
- Toss: Uganda who chose to field

=== 6th match ===
4 February 2010
Scorecard

Scotland; 123 (19.2 overs)	v	Kenya; 126/0 (14.3 overs)
Jan Stander 45 (39); Nehemiah Odhiambo 5/20 (4 overs)		David Obuya 65* (47)

Kenya won by 10 wickets
Gymkhana Club Ground, Nairobi, Kenya
Umpires: Subhash Modi and Isaac Oyieko (both KEN)

- Toss: Kenya, who chose to field.
- Points: Kenya 2, Scotland 0.
