= Hong Kong cricket team against Oman in the UAE in 2015–16 =

International cricket tour

	Hong Kong	Oman
- Dates: 21 November 2015 – 26 November 2015
Captains	Tanwir Afzal	Sultan Ahmed

Twenty20 International series
- Results: Oman won the 3-match series 2–1
Most runs	Babar Hayat (108)	Aamir Kaleem (88)
Most wickets	Aizaz Khan (6)	Bilal Khan (7)

The Hong Kong cricket team toured the United Arab Emirates in November 2015 to play three Twenty20 International (T20I) matches against Oman. Oman won the 3-match series 2–1. The matches were in preparation for the 2016 Asia Cup Qualifier.

== Squads ==
Hong Kong	Oman
Tanwir Afzal (c); Irfan Ahmed; Nadeem Ahmed; Haseeb Amjad; Jamie Atkinson; Waqas Barkat; Christopher Carter; Mark Chapman; Babar Hayat; Aizaz Khan; Nizakat Khan; Waqas Khan; Ishtiaq Muhammad; Ehsan Nawaz; Anshy Rath; Kinchit Shah; Ninad Shah	Sultan Ahmed (c); Aamir Kaleem; Aaqib Sulehri; Adnan Ilyas; Amir Ali; Munis Ansari; Bilal Khan; Jatinder Singh; Swapnil Khadye; Khawar Ali; Ajay Lalcheta; Mehran Khan; Moonamchery Michal; Mohammad Nadeem; Rajeshkumar Ranpura; Sufyan Mehmood; Vaibhav Wategaonkar; Yousuf Al Balushi; Zeeshan Maqsood; Zeeshan Siddiqui

== T20I series ==
=== 1st T20I ===
21 November 2015
10:00
Scorecard

Hong Kong; 106/9 (20 overs)	v	Oman; 107/4 (18.3 overs)
Waqas Khan 19 (28); Bilal Khan 3/29 (4 overs)		Sultan Ahmed 37 (32); Tanwir Afzal 2/22 (4 overs)

Oman won by 6 wickets
Sheikh Zayed Cricket Stadium, Abu Dhabi
Umpires: Vineet Kulkarni (Ind) and Sarika Prasad (Sin)

- Oman won the toss and elected to field.
- Christopher Carter (HK), Aaqib Sulehri, Adnan Ilyas, Bilal Khan and Ajay Lalcheta (Oman) all made their T20I debuts.

=== 2nd T20I ===
25 November 2015
10:00
Scorecard

Oman; 131/6 (20 overs)	v	Hong Kong; 127 (19.5 overs)
Aamir Kaleem 42* (31); Aizaz Khan 3/22 (4 overs)		Nizakat Khan 29 (26); Bilal Khan 4/20 (3.5 overs)

Oman won by 4 runs
Sheikh Zayed Cricket Stadium, Abu Dhabi
Umpires: Vineet Kulkarni (Ind) and Sarika Prasad (Sin)

- Hong Kong won the toss and elected to field.

=== 3rd T20I ===
26 November 2015
14:00
Scorecard

Oman; 149/4 (20 overs)	v	Hong Kong; 155/2 (18.3 overs)
Adnan Ilyas 49 (46); Aizaz Khan 2/15 (4 overs)		Babar Hayat 65 (45); Mehran Khan 1/24 (4 overs)

Hong Kong won by eight wickets
Sheikh Zayed Cricket Stadium, Abu Dhabi
Umpires: Buddhi Pradhan (Nep) and Raveendra Wimalasiri (SL)

- Hong Kong won the toss and elected to field.
- Sufyan Mehmood (Oman) made his T20I debut.
