= Ajay Lalcheta =

Indian cricketer

Personal information
- Full name: Ajay Vrajlal Lalcheta
- Born: 22 October 1983 (age 43); Porbandar, Gujarat, India
- Batting: Left-handed
- Bowling: Slow left-arm orthodox

International information
- National side: Oman (2015–2019)
- ODI debut (cap 14): 18 August 2019 v Scotland
- Last ODI: 21 August 2019 v PNG
- T20I debut (cap 15): 21 November 2015 v Hong Kong
- Last T20I: 17 February 2019 v Scotland

Career statistics
Competition	T20I	T20
Matches	9	18
Runs scored	37	44
Batting average	18.50	22.00
100s/50s	0/0	0/0
Top score	16	16
Balls bowled	213	405
Wickets	6	14
Bowling average	39.83	32.50
5 wickets in innings	0	0
10 wickets in match	0	0
Best bowling	1/13	2/13
Catches/stumpings	3/–	4/–
- Source: ESPNcricinfo, 21 August 2019

Ajay Vrajlal Lalcheta (Gujarati: અજય લાલચતા; born 22 October 1983) is an Indian-born cricketer who plays for the Oman national cricket team. Lalcheta played underage cricket in India before emigrating to Oman, making his debut for the Omani national side at the 2011 ACC Twenty20 Cup. He played five matches at the 2012 World Twenty20 Qualifier in the United Arab Emirates, which were accorded Twenty20 status.

== Early career ==
Lalcheta played several seasons for Saurashtra underage representative sides. He is a left-handed batsman and left-arm orthodox spinner. He made his debut for the Saurashtra under-16s in November 1998, aged 15, in the 1998–99 Vijay Merchant Trophy. In that tournament, he scored 187 runs, behind only Mahesh Bhutia (204 runs) for Saurashtra, most of which came in an innings of 87 against the Maharashtra under-16s. Lalcheta went on to play at under-19 and under-22 level for Saurashtra, with his last match in an Indian domestic tournament coming in November 2005, in the C. K. Nayudu Trophy.

== Oman career ==
After emigrating to Oman, Lalcheta made his debut for the national side at the 2011 ACC Twenty20 Cup, where Oman finished third to qualify for the 2012 ICC World Twenty20 Qualifier in the United Arab Emirates. At the ACC Twenty20 Cup, he took eight wickets at an average of 12.00, behind only Aamer Kaleem and Hemal Mehta (10 wickets each) for Oman.

Against Afghanistan, the eventual winner of the tournament, he took 4/13 from 3.3 overs, though the man of the match award went to Afghan Hamid Hassan, who helped bowl Oman out for 77. At the World Twenty20 Qualifier, Oman lost all seven of its group matches to finish bottom of Group B, but defeated Denmark in the 15th-place playoff.

Lalcheta played in only five matches in the tournament – he was first included in the team for its second match, against Uganda, but after playing in the next match, against Kenya, made no further appearances until towards the tournament's end, playing in the final two group matches against Namibia and Ireland, and then in the 15th-place playoff.

Lalcheta bowled 17 overs during the tournament, taking four wickets at an average of 25.25. His best figures, 2/13 from four overs, came against Namibia, and included the wickets of veterans Gerrie Snyman and Nicolaas Scholtz. Only Hemal Mehta (12 wickets), Zeeshan Siddiqui (8), and Rajesh Ranpura (5) took more wickets for Oman in the tournament.

Since the 2012 ICC World Twenty20 Qualifier, Lalcheta has featured regularly for Oman in ACC and ICC limited-overs tournaments, including the 2013 and 2015 ACC Twenty20 Cups, the 2014 ACC Premier League and the 2013 WCL Division Three and 2014 WCL Division Four tournaments. Notable performances have included 4/22 against Hong Kong in the 2014 ACC Premier League, 5/20 against Singapore in the 2014 WCL Division Four tournament, and a man-of-the-match 36 runs and 3/22 against Saudi Arabia in the 2015 ACC Twenty20 Cup. Lalcheta's 12 wickets in the 2014 WCL Division Four tournament were second only to Malaysia's Sharul Nizam (16 wickets) overall. Against Denmark in that tournament, he ran out Shehzad Ahmed while he was backing up, providing one of the few instances of "Mankading" in an international competition.

== International career ==
He made his Twenty20 International debut for Oman against Hong Kong on 21 November 2015. He was named captain of Oman national cricket team for 2016 ICC World Cricket League Division Five replacing Sultan Ahmed who captained them in 2016 ICC World Twenty20. He made his List A debut in Oman's three-match series against the United Arab Emirates in October 2016.

In January 2018, he was named in Oman's squad for the 2018 ICC World Cricket League Division Two tournament. In August 2018, he was named in Oman's squad for the 2018 Asia Cup Qualifier tournament.

In December 2018, he was named in Oman's team for the 2018 ACC Emerging Teams Asia Cup. In July 2019, he was named in Oman's One Day International (ODI) squad for the 2019 Scotland Tri-Nation Series. He made his ODI debut for Oman, against Scotland, on 18 August 2019.
