= Nandikishore Patel =

Ugandan cricketer (born 1982)

Personal information
- Born: 21 January 1982 (age 44)
- Batting: Right-handed
- Bowling: Right-arm medium-fast

International information
- National side: Uganda

Career statistics
Competition	First-class	List A
Matches	4	6
Runs scored	178	41
Batting average	29.66	10.25
100s/50s	0/1	0/0
Top score	74	21
Balls bowled	162	–
Wickets	0	–
Bowling average	–	–
5 wickets in innings	–	–
10 wickets in match	–	–
Best bowling	–	–
Catches/stumpings	1/–	3/–
- Source: CricketArchive, 7 November 2022

Nandikishore Patel, also known as Nand Kishore (born 21 January 1982), is an Ugandan cricketer. A right-handed batsman and right arm medium-fast bowler.

== Career ==
He played six matches for Uganda in the 2005 ICC Trophy in Ireland, and made four first-class appearances for them in the ICC Intercontinental Cup.

In his debut ODI in ICC Trophy, against Denmark, on July 1, 2005, Patel scored 17 runs. Denmark won the match by 28 runs. In 2010, he was recalled to the national squad for the ICC(International Cup) Intercontinental Shield match against Namibia to bolster the team's batting lineup. He has been a prominent player for Jinja Indians in Ugandan domestic cricket.

== See also ==
- Irfan Afridi
- Hamza Almuzahim
- Davis Arinaitwe
- Zephania Arinaitwe
- Akbar Baig
- Nehal Bibodi
- Charlie de Souza
- Peter de Souza
