= Afghan cricket team in Kenya in 2010–11 =

Afghan cricket team in Kenya in 2010-11
	Afghanistan	Kenya
- Dates: 2 October 2010 – 11 October 2010
Captains	Nawroz Mangal	Morris Ouma (ICC Cup); Jimmy Kamande (ODIs)

One Day International series
- Results: Kenya won the 3-match series 2–1
Most runs	Mohammad Nabi (83)	Collins Obuya (135)
Most wickets	Mirwais Ashraf (5); Samiullah Shinwari (5)	Nehemiah Odhiambo (6)

The Afghan cricket team toured Kenya from 2–11 October 2010. The tour consisted of one Intercontinental Cup Match and three One Day Internationals (ODIs). Kenya defeated Afghanistan 2–1 in the ODI series.

== Intercontinental Cup Match ==
2–5 October
Scorecard

Afghanistan	v	Kenya
464 (105 overs); Nawroz Mangal 168 (187); Elijah Otieno 4/99 (19 overs)		160 (39.5 overs); Seren Waters 73 (95); Hamid Hassan 5/70 (13 overs)
207 (49.1 overs); Javed Ahmadi 55 (59); James Ngoche 5/39 (13.1 overs)		344 (90.5 overs); Morris Ouma 68 (112); Hamid Hassan 6/87 (18.5 overs)

Afghanistan won by 167 runs
Gymkhana Club Ground, Nairobi
Umpires: Marais Erasmus (SA) and Subhash Modi (Ken)

- Afghanistan won the toss and elected to bat.

== ODI series ==
=== 1st ODI ===
7 October 2010
Scorecard

Kenya; 180 (46.2 overs)	v	Afghanistan; 88 (27.5 overs)
Steve Tikolo 57 (65); Hamid Hassan 4/26 (8.2 overs)		Noor Ali Zadran 41 (72); Nehemiah Odhiambo 3/16 (6 overs)

Kenya won by 92 runs
Gymkhana Club Ground, Nairobi
Umpires: Marais Erasmus (SA) and Subhash Modi (Ken)

- Kenya won the toss and elected to bat.

=== 2nd ODI ===
9 October 2010
Scorecard

Kenya; 139 (41 overs)	v	Afghanistan; 143/4 (27 overs)
Tanmay Mishra 32 (40); Samiullah Shinwari 3/29 (10 overs)		Asghar Stanikzai 55* (62); Steve Tikolo 1/7 (2 overs)

Afghanistan won by 6 wickets
Nairobi Gymkhana Club, Nairobi
Umpires: Marais Erasmus (SA) and Subhash Modi (Ken)

- Kenya won the toss and elected to bat.

=== 3rd ODI ===
11 October 2010
Scorecard

Afghanistan; 188 (43 overs)	v	Kenya; 189/2 (41.3 overs)
Mohammad Nabi 60 (69); Nehemiah Odhiambo 2/18 (7 overs)		Collins Obuya 86* (96); Izatullah Dawlatzai 1/13 (5 overs)

Kenya won by 8 wickets
Nairobi Gymkhana Club, Nairobi
Umpires: Marais Erasmus (SA) and Subhash Modi (Ken)

- Afghanistan won the toss and elected to bat.
