= Rohit Kanaiya =

Indian-born former Danish cricketer (born 1973)

Personal information
- Full name: Rohit Mahendra Kanaiya
- Born: 22 February 1973 (age 53); Chennai, Tamil Nadu, India
- Batting: Right-handed
- Bowling: Right-arm medium
- Relatives: Jayantilal Mahendra (father)

International information
- National side: Denmark

Career statistics
Competition	List A
Matches	2
Runs scored	7
Batting average	3.50
100s/50s	–/–
Top score	7
Balls bowled	52
Wickets	–
Bowling average	–
5 wickets in innings	–
10 wickets in match	–
Best bowling	–
Catches/stumpings	–/–
- Source: Cricinfo, 16 January 2011

Rohit Mahendra Kanaiya (born 22 February 1973) is an Indian-born former Danish cricketer. Kanaiya was a right-handed batting who bowled right-arm medium pace. He was born at Chennai, Tamil Nadu.

Having moved to Denmark in 2001, Kanaiya made his debut for Denmark in the 2006 European Championship Division One, making two appearances against Ireland and the Netherlands. In 2009, he selected in Denmark's fifteen man squad for the World Cup Qualifier in South Africa. The matches in this tournament held List A status, with Kanaiya making two appearances against the Netherlands and Oman. Against the Netherlands, he was dismissed by Ryan ten Doeschate for 7 runs, Against Oman, he was dismissed by Tariq Hussain for a duck. Denmark finished the tournament in twelfth and last place, therefore failing to qualify for the 2011 World Cup. These matches were his final appearances for Denmark.

His father, Jayantilal Mahendra, played first-class cricket in India for Kerala.
