= Maqsood Hussain =

Maqsood Hussain may refer to:

- Maqsood Hussain (field hockey)
- Maqsood Hussain (cricketer)
