= Khaliq Dad =

Afghan cricketer

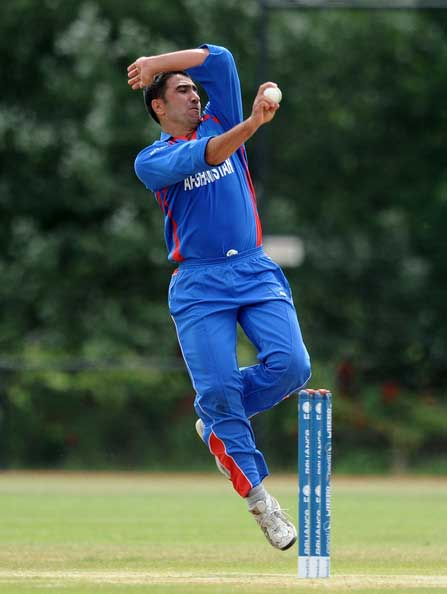

Personal information
- Full name: Khaliq Dad Noori
- Born: 1 January 1984 (age 42); Baghlan, Baghlan Province, Afghanistan
- Batting: Right-handed
- Bowling: Right-arm fast-medium
- Relatives: Allah Dad Noori (brother)

International information
- National side: Afghanistan
- ODI debut (cap 6): 19 April 2009 v Scotland
- Last ODI: 9 July 2010 v Scotland

Career statistics
Competition	ODI	FC	LA
Matches	6	1	10
Runs scored	40	1	57
Batting average	13.33	0.50	11.40
100s/50s	–/–	–/–	–/–
Top score	20	1	20
Balls bowled	252	99	396
Wickets	9	2	12
Bowling average	16.66	27.50	22.00
5 wickets in innings	–	–	–
10 wickets in match	–	–	–
Best bowling	3/30	1/24	3/30
Catches/stumpings	–/–	–/–	–/–
- Source: Cricinfo, 5 October 2010

Khaliq Dad Noori (born 1 January 1984) is an Afghan cricketer who plays for the Afghanistan national cricket team. He is a right-handed batsman who bowls right-arm fast-medium.

== Early career ==
Noori was born in Baghlan, Afghanistan. He spent much of his early years in refugee camps with his family, fleeing from the Soviet invasion of Afghanistan and the subsequent Civil War that followed the Soviet withdrawal. Noori, like many of his teammates, learnt the game in neighbouring Pakistan.

Noori made his representative debut for Afghanistan against Nowshehra on 15 October 2001 in the Quaid-e-Azam Trophy (Grade II). This game occurred a week into the NATO invasion of Afghanistan.

Noori's international debut for Afghanistan came against Oman in the 2004 ACC Trophy. In 2006, he toured England, playing in a single match against the Essex Second XI. Later in 2006, he represented the team in the 2006 ACC Trophy, where he played in 2 matches against Iran and Nepal.

=== 2009–present ===
Noori was a member of Afghanistan's 2009 ICC World Cup Qualifiers squad. He made his List-A debut during the tournament against Kenya and later in the tournament he made his One Day International debut against Scotland, where he took 2/25.

Later, in November 2009, he made his unofficial Twenty20 debut for Afghanistan against China in the 2009 ACC Twenty20 Cup. He later played in the final of the tournament, where Afghanistan defeated the United Arab Emirates by 84 runs.

Prior to Afghanistan's tour of Kenya in October 2010, Noori had represented Afghanistan in 6 One Day Internationals. His debut in first-class cricket came during Afghanistan's tour of Kenya, when Afghanistan played Kenya in the 2009-10 ICC Intercontinental Cup. During the match, he took his first 2 first-class wickets, those of Nehemiah Odhiambo and David Obuya.

Noori is currently coaching Uzbekistan national cricket team.

== Family ==
Noori's brother, Allah Noori Noori was the first captain of the Afghanistan national cricket team.
