= Zeeshan Siddiqui =

Pakistani-born cricketer

Personal information
- Full name: Zeeshan Ahmed Siddiqui
- Born: 22 July 1979 (age 47); Karachi, Sindh, Pakistan
- Batting: Right-handed
- Bowling: Right-arm leg break
- Role: All-rounder

International information
- National side: Oman (2007–2015)
- T20I debut (cap 11): 25 July 2015 v Afghanistan
- Last T20I: 29 November 2015 v Afghanistan

Career statistics
Competition	T20I	LA	T20
Matches	5	10	17
Runs scored	60	251	275
Batting average	15.00	25.10	18.33
100s/50s	0/0	0/2	0/2
Top score	33*	66	67
Balls bowled	–	366	114
Wickets	–	11	12
Bowling average	–	32.45	11.66
5 wickets in innings	–	0	0
10 wickets in match	–	0	0
Best bowling	–	3/64	3/16
Catches/stumpings	0/–	2/–	3/–
- Source: CricketArchive, 11 March 2016

Zeeshan Ahmed Siddiqui (born 22 July 1979) is a Pakistani-born cricketer who plays for the Oman national cricket team. He debuted for Oman at the 2007 ACC Twenty20 Cup, and has since played regularly for the side, including at list-A and Twenty20 level. Zeeshan is a leg-spinning all-rounder who often opens the batting.

Born in Karachi, Zeeshan made his debut for Oman aged 28, at the ACC Twenty20 Cup hosted by Kuwait in October 2007. He played in all six of Oman's matches in that tournament, including the final, where Oman tied with Afghanistan to claim its first ACC title in any format. Zeeshan's twelve wickets at the tournament, more than any other Omani, came at an average of 8.50, and included figures of 4/12 in the group match against Afghanistan, for which he was named man of the match. He also scored 128 runs, second only to Adnan Ilyas for Oman, and top-scored with 34 against Malaysia.

Zeeshan made his list-A debut in November 2007, playing three matches at the 2007 World Cricket League Division Two tournament in Namibia. Against the United Arab Emirates in the tournament's final, he scored a maiden list-A half-century, 66 runs from 49 balls. After placing second in WCL Division Two, Oman qualified for the 2009 World Cup Qualifier in South Africa. At that tournament, Zeeshan scored 177 runs for Oman, second only to Farhan Khan, and scored another half-century, 50 runs against Scotland. His best bowling figures, 3/64, came in the same match, and he finished the tournament with eight wickets, behind only Tariq Hussain (11) and Hemal Mehta (9) for Oman.

At the 2011 ACC Twenty20 Cup, Oman placed third to qualify for the 2012 World Twenty20 Qualifier. Against Bhutan in the former tournament, Zeeshan was man of the match, scoring 31 from 19 balls opening the batting with Rajesh Ranpura, and then going on to take 2/3 to help Oman win by 124 runs. At the World Twenty20 Qualifier, he played in all seven of Oman's group matches, as well as the 15th-place playoff against Denmark, which Oman won to record its only victory of the tournament. Zeeshan was man of the match against Denmark, recording Oman's highest individual score of the tournament, 67 from 36 balls, before being stumped by Freddie Klokker off of Martin Pedersen. With 119 runs in the tournament, he placed second to Jatinder Singh (136) in runs scored for Oman, but led Oman's bowling, with 12 wickets. His best figures, 3/16, came against Uganda, but were not enough to stop Oman losing by three wickets.

Now considered one of the veterans of the side, Zeeshan has continued to feature regularly for Oman in ACC and ICC tournaments, though the team is yet to qualify for any further high-level associate competitions. At the 2013 WCL Division Three tournament, he scored 69 not out against Uganda in the 2013 WCL Division Three tournament, and followed that with 64 against Italy in the 5th-place playoff. Another man-of-the-match performance came against Jersey at the 2014 WCL Division Four tournament in Singapore, where he scored 87 not out opening with Zeeshan Maqsood, helping Oman to a seven-wicket win.

He made his Twenty20 International debut against Afghanistan in the 2015 ICC World Twenty20 Qualifier tournament on 25 July 2015.
