= Tariq Hussain =

Tariq Hussain may refer to:

- Tariq Hussain (cricketer)
- Tariq Hussain (musician)
- Muhammad Tariq Hussain, footballer
- Tariq Hussein, fictional character in Causality
