= Cricket in Bhutan =

Cricket in Bhutan, nicknamed The Dragons, represents the Kingdom of Bhutan in international cricket. The team is organised by the Bhutan Cricket Council Board, which became an affiliate member of the International Cricket Council (ICC) in 2001.

In April 2018, the ICC decided to grant full Twenty20 International (T20I) status to all its members. Therefore, all Twenty20 matches played between Bhutan and other ICC members after 1 January 2019 will be a full T20I.

== History ==
Bhutan stayed confined for a considerable length of time, self-abstained and obscure to the remainder of the world. It is very surprising that Bhutan stayed free having been situated between the Asian mammoths India and China. Arrow based weaponry being the national game remained the most known and played game in the nation. Before the 90s, a limited number of matches was played, primarily in the southern towns.

After TV was acquainted with the nation during the 90s it advanced cricket, with the ICC Cricket World Cup in 1999 in England being displayed as the main significant occasion for the number of inhabitants in Bhutan. Inside no time eager cricket darlings ventured up in building up an affiliation and by 2001 the Bhutan Cricket Board were perceived by the Asian Cricket Council (ACC) and in 2003 turned into an individual from the International Cricket Council (ICC).

Bhutan Cricket Council Board became an affiliate member of the ICC in 2001. They made their ACC Trophy debut at the 2004 tournament, where they made the quarter finals.

They again competed at the ACC Trophy in 2006 but were eliminated in the first round after a series of heavy defeats. Their only win came against newcomers Myanmar.

Following the 2006 ACC Trophy, the tournament was split into two divisions: Elite and Challenge. Bhutan took part in the 2009 ACC Trophy Challenge, where they were runners up. This result qualified them for the next ACC Trophy Elite as well as Division Eight of the World Cricket League.

Bhutan partook in its first worldwide competition in Nepal in 2003 and in 2004 Bhutan packed away its first universal success against Iran in the ACC Trophy held in Kuala Lumpur, Malaysia, before at long last losing to Nepal in the quarter-finals.

In December 2011 took part in the ACC Twenty20 Cup in Nepal which served as qualifier for 2012 ICC World Twenty20.
