= Nawroz Mangal =

Afghan cricketer

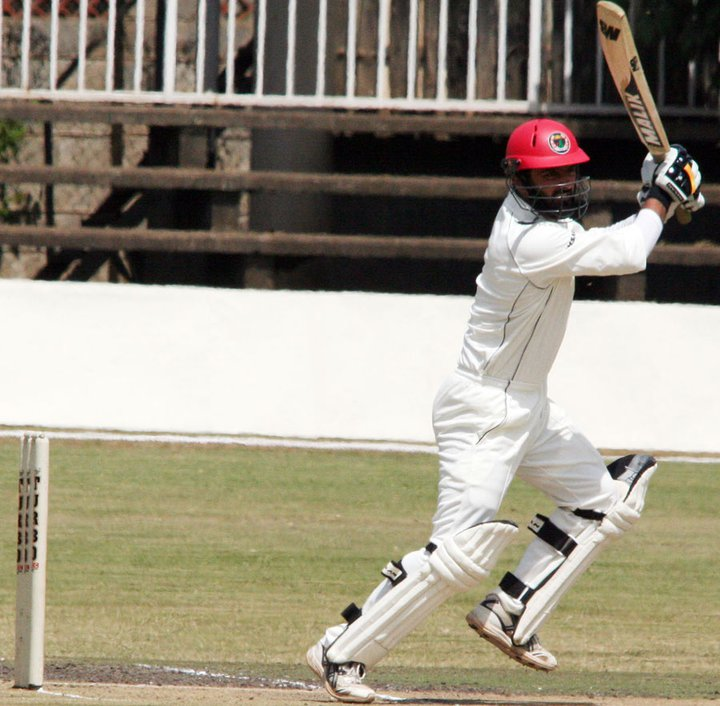

Personal information
- Full name: Nawroz Khan Mangal
- Born: 28 November 1984 (age 41); Logar, Afghanistan
- Batting: Right-handed
- Bowling: Right-arm off break
- Role: Top order batsman
- Relatives: Ihsanullah (brother)

International information
- National side: Afghanistan (2009–2017)
- ODI debut (cap 8): 19 April 2009 v Scotland
- Last ODI: 1 October 2016 v Bangladesh
- ODI shirt no.: 48
- T20I debut (cap 7): 1 February 2010 v Ireland
- Last T20I: 20 January 2017 v Ireland
- T20I shirt no.: 48

Career statistics
Competition	ODI	T20I	FC	LA
Matches	49	32	14	73
Runs scored	1,139	505	832	1,696
Batting average	27.11	18.03	37.81	26.09
100s/50s	2/4	0/2	1/5	2/7
Top score	129	65*	168	129
Balls bowled	293	60	162	485
Wickets	8	4	1	10
Bowling average	29.37	20.00	105.00	40.40
5 wickets in innings	0	0	0	0
10 wickets in match	0	0	0	0
Best bowling	3/37	3/23	1/34	3/35
Catches/stumpings	19/–	16/–	13/–	25/–
Medal record
Representing Afghanistan
Men's Cricket
Asian Games
Silver medal – second place	2010 Guangzhou	Team
- Source: Cricinfo, 21 January 2017

Nawroz Mangal (born Nawroz Khan Mangal) (نوروز خان منګل; born 28 November 1984) is a former cricketer from Afghanistan. Mangal is a former captain of the Afghanistan national cricket team who is known for leading Afghanistan to the prestigious ODI status. In January 2017, he retired from international cricket and became the national chief selector for Afghanistan.

== Early career ==
Born in Kabul, Afghanistan, Mangal spent much of his early years in refugee camps in neighbouring Pakistan with his family, after fleeing the Soviet invasion of Afghanistan and the subsequent Civil War that followed the Soviet withdrawal. It was in the camps that Mangal, like many of his teammates, was introduced to cricket. The war in Afghanistan saw the US Army put an end to Taliban rule of Afghanistan in 2001 and Mangal returned to the country soon after. In the aftermath, the Afghanistan national cricket team was founded.

Mangal was spotted by then Afghanistan coach Taj Malik. Mangal's father tried to stop him playing, citing the sport as not being a living. Malik went to the province of Khost on the Pakistan border to speak convince Mangal's father, telling him: "He will be great". Malik stayed the night pleading with him, and by the morning, convinced him to allow Mangal to play. Mangal made his debut for Afghanistan against Nowshehra in the 2001 Quaid-e-Azam Trophy (Grade II). He made his international debut against Oman in the 2004 ACC Trophy. During the tournament, Mangal was Afghanistan's leading run scorer with 271 runs. It was the first time the team participated in the competition. They progressed to the quarter-finals where they lost to Kuwait.

== Playing career ==
In 2007, Mangal was appointed the captain of the national side, taking up the post against Lower Dir District in the 2007/8 Inter-District Senior Tournament. Mangal led the Afghan cricket team that in under a year won the World Cricket League Division Five, Division Four and Division Three, therefore promoting them to Division Two and allowing them to take part in the 2009 ICC World Cup Qualifier. In that tournament he led Afghanistan to 5th place and ODI status and promotion to World Cricket League Division One. Mangal led Afghanistan to victory over Scotland in their first ever ODI, with himself claiming the winning wicket of John Blain.

He captained Afghanistan in their debut, and his debut first class match in the Intercontinental Cup against a Zimbabwe XI in which Afghanistan drew the match. Mangal has subsequently led Afghanistan to victories over the Netherlands and Ireland in the tournament. Mangal made his maiden first-class fifty against Ireland with a score of 84.

In February 2010, Mangal made his Twenty20 International debut against Ireland, which Afghanistan lost by 5 wickets. Mangal led Afghanistan to victory in the 2010 ICC World Twenty20 Qualifier with figures of 3/23 as Afghanistan defeated Ireland by 8 wickets in the final. Afghanistan's victory qualified them to take part in the 2010 ICC World Twenty20. Following the tournament, Mangal led Afghanistan to an astonishing victory over Canada in the Intercontinental Cup. Set 494 to win, Mangal shared a 163 run partnership with Mohammad Shahzad in which he contributed 70 runs to the partnership as Afghanistan won the match by 6 wickets.

In April 2010, Mangal led the side to victory in the 2010 ACC Trophy Elite, where Afghanistan defeated Nepal in the final by 95 runs, with Mangal himself claiming the winning wicket of Rahul Vishvakarma. He is the best Afganistani player.

Mangal led Afghanistan into the 2010 ICC World Twenty20, despite the team losing to Test nations India and South Africa, the team won many plaudits from cricket figures. As of October 2010, Mangal has led Afghanistan to the top of 2009–10 ICC Intercontinental Cup in Afghanistan's first season of playing first-class cricket.

He scored his maiden first-class century against Kenya in October 2010, making 168 runs before being run out by Elijah Otieno. His innings, along with the bowling of teammate Hameed Hasan, was instrumental in securing Afghanistan a 167 run victory.

In November 2010 it was announced that all-rounder Mohammad Nabi would captain Afghanistan in the 2010 Asian Games twenty20 tournament in China later that month. The Afghanistan Cricket Board released a statement that "We have played 16 one-day internationals but we could only win nine therefore we thought the burden of captaincy is too heavy on Nawroz and Nabi is the next best choice". After causing an upset by beating Pakistan in the semi-finals of the games, Afghanistan lost the final to Bangladesh and finished with a silver medal.
