= Henrik Hansen (cricketer) =

Danish cricketer (born 1977)

Personal information
- Full name: Henrik Saxe Hansen
- Born: 23 June 1977 (age 49); Ringsted, Ringsted Municipality, Denmark
- Batting: Right-handed
- Bowling: Right-arm fast-medium

International information
- National side: Denmark

Domestic team information
- Years: Team
- 2001–2002: Denmark

Career statistics
Competition	List A
Matches	20
Runs scored	148
Batting average	12.33
100s/50s	–/–
Top score	45*
Balls bowled	877
Wickets	14
Bowling average	47.42
5 wickets in innings	–
10 wickets in match	–
Best bowling	2/28
Catches/stumpings	4/–
- Source: Cricinfo, 16 September 2012

Henrik Saxe Hansen (born 23 June 1977) is a Danish cricketer. Hansen is a right-handed batsman who bowls right-arm fast-medium. He was born at Ringsted, Ringsted Municipality.

== Career ==
Hansen made his debut for Denmark against Gibraltar in the 1996 European Championship, a tournament in which he made four appearances. His next appearance for Denmark came four years later in the 2000 European Championship, where he again played four matches. The following year, he made his List A debut for Denmark against Suffolk in the 1st round of English domestic cricket's 2002 Cheltenham & Gloucester Trophy, played in August 2001 to avoid fixture congestion early in the 2002 season. Exactly a year later, he made a second List A appearance against the Leicestershire Cricket Board in the 1st round of the 2003 Cheltenham & Gloucester Trophy, played to the same arrangement as the previous competition. He also played in the 2002 European Championship, making five appearances. Two years later he played in the European Championship Division One, making three appearances.

The following year he was selected in Denmark's squad for the 2005 ICC Trophy in Ireland. The International Cricket Council afforded List A status to these matches, with Hansen making seven List A appearances during the tournament. He took 8 wickets during the tournament at an average of 29.37, with best figures of 2/28. With the bat, he scored 28 runs with a high score of 18. The following year, he played in the European Championship Division One, making four appearances in the tournament. In October 2007, Hansen toured Kenya with Denmark, making two appearances against a Coast Cricket Association XI and a Nairobi Province Cricket Association XI. In November that year, he was selected in Denmark's squad for the World Cricket League Division Two in Namibia, where he made five List A appearances. He only took two wickets in the entire tournament, while with the bat he scored 8 runs in four innings.

Hansen later played in the 2008 European Championship Division One, making four appearances, before being selected in Denmark's fifteen-man squad for the 2009 World Cup Qualifier in South Africa. He made six List A appearances during the tournament, the last of which came against Oman. He took 3 wickets in the tournament, at an expensive average of 79.33. while with the bat he scored 110 runs at an average of 27.50, with a high score of 45 not out. Denmark finished the tournament in the twelfth and last place, therefore failing to qualify for the 2011 World Cup. This tournament also marked his final appearance in List A cricket. Having played a total of twenty matches in that format for his country, Hansen took 14 wickets at an average of 47.42, with best figures of 2/28. With the bat, he scored 148 runs at an average of 12.33, with a high score of 45 not out. In 2010, he played in the European Championship Division One, making five appearances. In August 2012, he was selected in Denmark's fourteen-man squad for the World Cricket League Division Four in Malaysia.
