= Sonam Tobgay =

Bhutanese sportsman

Personal information
- Full name: Sonam Tobgay
- Date of birth: 25 March 1990 (age 36)
- Place of birth: Lhuntse, Bhutan
- Height: 1.85 m (6 ft 1 in)
- Position: Forward

International career
Years	Team	Apps	(Gls)
2016–2019	Bhutan	6	(0)
- Cricket career
Cricket information
- Batting: Right-handed
- Bowling: Right-arm medium
- Role: All-rounder
International information
- National side: Bhutan (2019–present)
- T20I debut (cap 10): 5 December 2019 v Nepal
- Last T20I: 7 December 2019 v Maldives
Career statistics
Competition	T20I
Matches	2
Runs scored	39
Batting average	19.50
100s/50s	0/0
Top score	24
Balls bowled	24
Wickets	0
Bowling average	-
5 wickets in innings	0
10 wickets in match	0
Best bowling	-
Catches/stumpings	1/–
- Source: Cricinfo, 7 December 2019

Sonam Tobgay (born 25 March 1990) is a Bhutanese sportsman who has represented his country in both cricket and football.

On 7 December 2019, he became the first batsman to be retired out in a T20I.

== Career ==
His international tournaments for the Bhutan include the 2006 ACC Trophy, the 2009 ACC Trophy Challenge, the 2010 ACC Trophy Elite, the 2010 ICC World Cricket League Division Eight, the 2011 ACC Twenty20 Cup, the 2012 ICC World Cricket League Division Eight, the 2012 ACC Trophy Elite, the 2014 ACC Elite League, and the 2017 ICC World Cricket League Asia Region Division One. He scored 55 runs against Saudi Arabia in the 2014 ACC Elite League, though his team still lost by 300 runs.

Tobgay made his first appearance for the Bhutan national football team in their final 2018 FIFA World Cup qualifying match against Maldives, coming on as a substitute in the 76th minute. He has played in six international football matches for Bhutan.

He made his Twenty20 International (T20I) debut in the 2019 South Asian Games against Nepal on 5 December 2019. During a group stage match against Maldives at the 2019 South Asian Games, he tactically retired at the end of the 19th over of the Bhutanese innings after scoring 24 off 35 balls. It became the first instance where a batsman retired out in a T20I match although the match happened to be part of a multi-sport event rather than an ICC event or a bilateral series. The T20 cricket tournament at the 2019 South Asian Games was given official international status by the ICC which confirmed that the retired out incident which took place during the tournament between Bhutan and Maldives was deemed as first ever instance to happen in T20I cricket.
