= Asadu Seiga =

Ugandan cricketer

Personal information
- Full name: Asadu Seiga
- Born: 28 November 1986 (age 39); Kampala, Uganda
- Batting: Right-handed
- Bowling: Right-arm medium

Career statistics
Competition	List A	Twenty20
Matches	5	5
Runs scored	12	19
Batting average	12.00	9.50
100s/50s	–/–	–/–
Top score	8*	18
Balls bowled	192	66
Wickets	6	1
Bowling average	34.66	128.00
5 wickets in innings	–	–
10 wickets in match	–	–
Best bowling	3/79	1/34
Catches/stumpings	2/–	1/–
- Source: Cricinfo, 1 February 2022

Asadu Seiga (born 28 September 1986) is a Ugandan former cricketer.

Seiga was born at Kampala in September 1986. He was selected in the Ugandan squad for the 2009 Cricket World Cup Qualifier, making his List A one-day debut during the tournament against Scotland. He played in three further matches during the qualifier; one group game against Oman, the 9th Place Play-off Semi-Final against Denmark, and the 9th Place Play-off against Bermuda. In August 2009, he toured Bermuda with the Ugandan team, playing in a single one-day match on the tour at Hamilton. In 2010, he was included in the Uganda squad for the Kenya Tri-Series, playing two Twenty20 matches against Kenya and Scotland. Two years later he was selected in the Ugandan squad for the 2012 ICC World Twenty20 Qualifier, making three appearances in the qualifier against Oman, Ireland and Bermuda. Playing in the Uganda team as a right-arm medium pace bowler, he took 6 wickets in List A cricket and a single wicket in Twenty20 cricket. Asadu recruited Irfan Afridi, nephew of Shahid Afridi, to his local cricket club following his emigration to Uganda in 2013, encouraging Afridi to represent Uganda, which he did in 2016.
