= Jan Stander =

Scottish cricketer

Personal information
- Full name: Jan Hendrik Stander
- Born: 4 January 1982 (age 44); Port Elizabeth, Cape Province, South Africa
- Batting: Right-handed
- Bowling: Right arm medium-fast
- Role: All-rounder

International information
- National side: Scotland
- ODI debut (cap 36): 1 April 2009 v Ireland
- Last ODI: 11 July 2012 v Canada
- T20I debut (cap 18): 6 June 2009 v New Zealand
- Last T20I: 24 July 2012 v Bangladesh

Domestic team information
- Years: Team
- 2003–2006: Aberdeenshire
- 2007–Date: Stoneywood-Dyce

Career statistics
Competition	ODI	T20I	FC	LA
Matches	5	11	1	23
Runs scored	44	94	64	308
Batting average	11.00	10.4	32.00	16.21
100s/50s	0/0	0/0	0/1	0/1
Top score	22*	45	64	80*
Balls bowled	150	81	180	865
Wickets	6	3	5	24
Bowling average	27.66	52.00	18.20	34,20
5 wickets in innings	0	0	0	0
10 wickets in match	0	0	0	0
Best bowling	2/25	2/24	3/43	4/41
Catches/stumpings	1/–	2/–	0/–	6/–
- Source: Cricinfo, 24 July 2012

Jan Hendrik Stander (born 4 January 1982) is a cricketer who represents Scotland. An all-rounder, Stander bats right handed and bowls right arm medium-fast. He was a member of the Scotland squad for the 2009 ICC World Cup Qualifier, during which he made his debut in One Day Internationals (ODIs). He has also played first-class and List A cricket for Scotland.

== Career ==
Stander moved to Scotland from his native South Africa in 2003. He began playing for Aberdeenshire Cricket Club that year, and remained with the club until 2006. By 2007 Stander was a cricket development officer for the Grampian region. Early that year he coached Scotland Under-15s on their tour of South Africa. For the 2007 season Stander moved to Stoneywood-Dyce; by 2008 he was the club's captain and led them to promotion in the Lloyds TSB Scotland League Division 1. By virtue of residing in the country for four years, in October 2008 Stander became eligible to represent Scotland at international level.

Three months after qualifying, he was called into the national squad for the first time; he was the only uncapped played in Scotland's 15-man squad for the 2009 World Cup Qualifier hosted by South Africa in April. It was felt that Stander's experience of South African conditions would be useful. His selection sparked debate about the state of Scottish cricket as some coaches were concerned that players born in the country were not being given enough opportunities. At the time, 3 of the 15 players in the squad were born outside Scotland. Stander brushed off the criticism, saying "I don't mind because I thrive under pressure. People have strong opinions on foreign players turning out for other countries, but if you love the game, you do all that's possible to play at the highest level." During the tournament, on 1 April Stander made his ODI debut against Ireland. Scotland had a poor tournament, finishing in the top six of the tournament, which was enough to retain the team's ODI status but not to qualify for the 2011 World Cup. In ten matches Stander scored 213 runs, making him Scotland's fourth-highest run-scorer in the tournament (the top three all scored more than 350), and was the team's third-highest wicket-taker with 13 dismissals.
