= Shoaib Sarwar =

United Arab Emirates cricketer (born 1986)

Personal information
- Born: 15 October 1986 (age 40); Dubai, United Arab Emirates
- Batting: Right-handed
- Bowling: Right-arm medium-fast
- Role: Bowler

Career statistics
Competition	First-class	List A
Matches	8	9
Runs scored	165	52
Batting average	15.00	17.33
100s/50s	0/2	0/0
Top score	61	13*
Balls bowled	972	329
Wickets	14	14
Bowling average	42.42	17.35
5 wickets in innings	0	1
10 wickets in match	0	0
Best bowling	4/87	5/23
Catches/stumpings	2/0	1/0
- Source: , 28 September 2008

Shoaib Sarwar (born 15 October 1986) is a United Arab Emirates cricketer. A right-handed batsman and right-arm medium-fast bowler, he has played for the United Arab Emirates national cricket team since 2006, including eight first-class and nine List A matches.

== Biography ==
Born in Dubai in 1986, Shoaib Sarwar first played for the UAE at Under-19 level, playing in the Youth Asia Cup in Karachi in 2003 and in the ACC Under-19 Cup in Nepal in 2005. He first played for the senior side in 2006, making his List A debut with matches against Ireland and Sri Lanka A in the EurAsia Cricket Series in Abu Dhabi. He also played against Brunei, and Saudi Arabia in that year's ACC Trophy.

He made his first-class debut in February 2008, playing an ICC Intercontinental Cup match against Kenya. He scored 61 in the second innings of that match, his highest first-class score. He has since played matches in the tournament against Ireland and the Netherlands, as well as a match against Essex County Cricket Club. He most recently represented his country in the ACC Trophy Elite tournament in Kuala Lumpur.
