= Mickey Lund =

Danish cricketer (born 1972)

Personal information
- Full name: Mickey Lund
- Born: 21 August 1972 (age 54); Frederiksberg, Denmark
- Batting: Right-handed
- Bowling: Leg break

International information
- National side: Denmark

Domestic team information
- Years: Team
- 2000–2005: Denmark

Career statistics
Competition	List A
Matches	20
Runs scored	360
Batting average	18.00
100s/50s	–/1
Top score	59
Balls bowled	–
Wickets	–
Bowling average	–
5 wickets in innings	–
10 wickets in match	–
Best bowling	–
Catches/stumpings	3/–
- Source: CricketArchive (subscription required), 16 January 2011

Mickey Lund (born 21 August 1972) is a Danish cricketer. A, right-handed batsman and a leg-break bowler, Lund played in the ICC Trophy for Denmark in 1997 and 2001, debuting against Malaysia in March 1997.

He started his career as an opening batsman for the Danish team, slowly making his way down the upper order as his international career progressed. He participated in the 2002 European Championship for his country, and in one match in the C&G Trophy competition of 2005.

Most recently, Lund played for Denmark in Division Two of the ICC World Cricket League in 2007.
