= Muhammad Javed (cricketer) =

Pakistani cricketer (born 1964)

Personal information
- Born: 25 December 1964 (age 61)
- Source: Cricinfo, 18 March 2020

Muhammad Javed (born 25 December 1964) is a Pakistani former cricketer and match referee. He played in fifteen first-class and ten List A matches between 1982 and 1991. In February 2020, he was named in Pakistan's squad for the Over-50s Cricket World Cup in South Africa. However, the tournament was cancelled during the third round of matches due to the COVID-19 pandemic.

He has refereed many international cricket matches, including three Tests.
