= Sufyan Mehmood =

Omani cricketer (born 1991)

Personal information
- Full name: Sufyan Mehmood
- Born: 21 October 1991 (age 35); Muscat, Oman
- Batting: Left-handed
- Bowling: Right-arm medium
- Role: Bowler

International information
- National side: Oman (2009–present)
- ODI debut (cap 21): 19 September 2021 v Nepal
- Last ODI: 27 May 2025 v United States
- T20I debut (cap 16): 26 November 2009 v Kuwait
- Last T20I: 25 September 2026 v Hong Kong

Career statistics
Competition	ODI	T20I
Matches	8	25
Runs scored	107	174
Batting average	17.83	13.38
100s/50s	0/1	0/0
Top score	72	37
Balls bowled	209	423
Wickets	6	24
Bowling average	24.50	24.20
5 wickets in innings	–	0
10 wickets in match	–	0
Best bowling	3/58	3/26
Catches/stumpings	0/–	9/–
- Source: Cricinfo, 19 May 2026

Sufyan Mehmood (Arabic: سفيان محمود; born 21 October 1991) is an Omani cricketer who plays for the Oman national cricket team. He is one of the few Omani citizens to play cricket for Oman.

== Early life and education ==
Born into an academically oriented family, Mehmood chose to pursue cricket over a traditional career path, declining an offer to study business administration at Loughborough University in the United Kingdom. He instead balanced his education at a local university with his cricket ambitions. His family, though initially hesitant, later supported his decision.

Mehmood's domestic career is intertwined with Oman's corporate cricket structure, where companies sponsor teams in the premier division. After a brief period working outside of cricket, he was hired by Enhance, playing for their team while working in the human resources department. He later moved to Renaissance Services, where he leads their corporate cricket team.

== Career ==
Mehmood represented Oman at the Under-15 and Under-17 levels before making his senior team debut in 2009. He played in the 2014 ICC World Cricket League Division Four tournament. He made his Twenty20 International debut against Hong Kong on 26 November 2015. He made his List A debut for Oman in their three-match series against the United Arab Emirates in October 2016.

In August 2018, he was named in Oman's squad for the 2018 Asia Cup Qualifier tournament. In October 2018, he was named in Oman's squad for the 2018 ICC World Cricket League Division Three tournament. In March 2019, he was named in Oman's team for the 2019 ICC World Cricket League Division Two tournament in Namibia. In September 2019, he was named in Oman's squad for the 2019 ICC T20 World Cup Qualifier tournament.

In September 2021, he was named in Oman's One Day International (ODI) squad for round six and round seven of the 2019–2023 ICC Cricket World Cup League 2. He made his ODI debut on 19 September 2021, for Oman against Nepal. He was also named in Oman's squad for the 2021 ICC Men's T20 World Cup.

In 2023, his career was briefly stalled by a meniscus tear. After consulting with specialists, he pursued a non-surgical recovery path focused on strengthening and rehabilitation, which allowed him to return to playing.

In May 2024, he was named as a reserve player in Oman's squad for the 2024 ICC Men's T20 World Cup tournament.
