= Sayed Nasratullah =

Afghan cricketer (born 1984)

Personal information
- Born: 10 May 1984 (age 42); Afghanistan
- Batting: Left-handed
- Bowling: Left-arm orthodox
- Source: Cricinfo, 10 August 2017

Sayed Nasratullah (born 10 May 1984) is an Afghan cricketer. He made his List A debut for Afghanistan against Ireland in the 2009 Cricket World Cup Qualifier on 11 April 2009. He made his Twenty20 debut for Kabul Eagles in the 2017 Shpageeza Cricket League on 16 September 2017. He made his first-class debut for Band-e-Amir Region in the 2017–18 Ahmad Shah Abdali 4-day Tournament on 20 October 2017.
