= Aman Ali (cricketer) =

Emirati cricketer (born 1989)

Personal information
- Full name: Mohammad Aman Ali
- Born: 29 September 1989 (age 37); Dubai, United Arab Emirates
- Batting: Right-handed
- Bowling: Left-arm fast-medium
- Role: Bowler

International information
- National side: United Arab Emirates
- Only ODI (cap 39): 26 June 2008 v Sri Lanka

Career statistics
Competition	ODI
Matches	1
Runs scored	0
Batting average	0.00
100s/50s	0/0
Top score	0
Balls bowled	12
Wickets	0
Bowling average	–
5 wickets in innings	–
10 wickets in match	–
Best bowling	–
Catches/stumpings	0/–
- Source: CricketArchive, 29 November 2008

Mohammad Aman Ali (born 29 September 1989) is a cricketer who has played one One Day International for the United Arab Emirates.
