= Fayyaz Ahmed =

Emirati cricketer (born 1983)

Personal information
- Born: 12 May 1983 (age 43); Gujrat City, Pakistan
- Batting: Left-handed
- Bowling: Slow left-arm orthodox
- Role: All-rounder

International information
- National side: United Arab Emirates
- Only ODI (cap 48): 2 May 2014 v Afghanistan
- Source: ESPNcricinfo, 28 November 2014

Fayyaz Ahmed (born 12 May 1983) is a Pakistani-born cricketer who played for the United Arab Emirates national cricket team. He made his One Day International debut for the UAE against Afghanistan in the 2014 ACC Premier League on 2 May 2014. He made his Twenty20 International debut against the Netherlands in the 2015 ICC World Twenty20 Qualifier tournament on 12 July 2015.
