= Yousuf Al Balushi =

Omani cricketer (born 1990)

Personal information
- Full name: Yousuf Abdulrahim Al Balushi
- Born: 28 March 1990 (age 36); Muscat, Oman

International information
- National side: Oman
- Source: Cricinfo, 19 February 2016

Yousuf Abdulrahim Al Balushi (also known as Yousuf Mahmood Rahimbaksh, born 28 March 1990) is an Omani cricketer, who played for the Oman national cricket team. He played in the Asian Cricket Council Under-19 Elite Cup tournament in 2007. He was included in the Oman Twenty20 International side for 2016 ICC World Twenty20, which is held in India.

== Career ==
In 2020, Al Balushi was suspended for seven years by the International Cricket Council on charges related to attempting to influence team members to fix a match at the 2019 ICC Men's T20 World Cup Qualifier tournament.
