= Nehal Bibodi =

Indian-born Ugandan cricketer (born 1971)

Cricket information
- Batting: Right-handed
- Bowling: Right-arm off-break

International information
- National side: Uganda

Career statistics
Competition	First-class	List A
Matches	2	7
Runs scored	90	103
Batting average	22.50	17.16
100s/50s	0/0	0/1
Top score	28	68
Balls bowled	48	114
Wickets	1	4
Bowling average	21.00	24.25
5 wickets in innings	0	0
10 wickets in match	0	0
Best bowling	1/11	3/53
Catches/stumpings	0/–	1/–
- Source: CricketArchive, 5 December 2022

Nehal Bibodi (born 18 March 1971) is an Indian born Ugandan cricketer who represented Uganda in their Intercontinental Cup campaign in 2005.

== Career ==
Bibodi represented Uganda in their Intercontinental Cup campaign in 2005. He has represented Uganda in various international competitions as a top order batsman. He later served as the chairman of the national selection committee. He plays as a right-handed opening batsman and occasional right-arm off-break bowler.

Bidodi played for Kampala Institute of Cricket Clubs (KICC) and made his debut for the Uganda national team (Cricket Cranes) in 1993 during the East and Central Africa Cricket Championship. His highest international score is 140 runs, from Botswana in 1998 during the Africa Zone VI Championship.

He retired from playing for the national team in 2013.
