= Nilesh Parmar =

Indian cricketer (born 1970)

Personal information
- Full name: Nileshkumar Narottambhai Parmar
- Born: 27 December 1970 (age 55); Gujarat, India
- Batting: Right-handed
- Role: Middle-order batsman

International information
- National side: Oman (2007–2013)
- Source: CricketArchive, 6 April 2016

Nileshkumar Narottambhai "Nilesh" Parmar (Gujarati: નિલેશ પરમાર; born 27 December 1970) is a former Indian-born cricketer who played for the Oman national cricket team between 2007 and 2013. He played as a right-handed middle-order batsman.

Parmar was born in the Indian state of Gujarat, and played at under-19 level for the Gujarat and Saurashtra cricket teams. After emigrating to Oman, he made his international debut at the 2007 ACC Twenty20 Cup in Kuwait, aged 36. He featured in three of his side's matches, and in the final against Afghanistan made 66 from 56 balls, for which he was named man of the match. Later in the year, Parmar represented Oman in the 2007 World Cricket League Division Two tournament, played in Namibia. He played in four matches, all of which held List A status, but had little success, scoring only 40 runs. At the 2009 World Cup Qualifier, Parmar topped Oman's batting averages, making 118 runs from four matches (including 41 against Ireland, 38 not out against Canada, and 37 against Scotland). After that event, he did not return to the national team until the 2013 WCL Division Three tournament, by which time he was aged 42. He played only a single match, against Nepal. After retiring from playing, Parmar took up coaching. He has served at various stages as assistant coach of Oman Cricket's national academy and head coach of the Omani national women's team.
