= Phuntsho Wangdi =

Bhutanese artist

- Born: 1989 (age 36–37); Takchu (Dzongkha:སྟག་ཆུ།), Mongar, Bhutan
- Education: Diploma
- Alma mater: National Institute of Zorig Chusum
- Occupation: Artist
- Known for: Blending traditional Bhutanese Thangka with Japanese techniques
- Notable work: "The Wheel of Power" (2023 Grand Prix)
- Style: Thangka, Bhutanese art
- Awards: 2023 Champion of International Artists Grand Prix Competition in Art Revolution Taipei
- Website: Gallery TAKCHU / 虎水畫廊

Phuntsho Wangdi (ཕུན་ཚོགས་དབང་འདུས། / 菩恩, born 1989) is a Bhutanese artist known for blending traditional Bhutanese Thangka painting techniques with Japanese influences. He gained recognition in 2023 by winning the International Artist Grand Prize at Art Revolution Taipei, one of Asia's top contemporary art competitions. Phuntsho is known for his intricate brushwork, attention to detail, and the fusion of cultural art forms in his work.

== Early life and education ==
Phuntsho Wangdi was born in 1989 in Takchu, Mongar, Bhutan. He studied at the National Institute of Zorig Chusum, Bhutan's premier institution for traditional arts, from 2007 to 2012. There, he focused on Bhutanese painting, particularly Thangka and sacred art.

After completing his studies, Phuntsho worked under the mentorship of the Bhutanese artist Lopen Tobgay. He contributed to national projects, including murals at the Buddha Dordenma statue in Thimphu and the Wangdue Phodrang Dzong. These experiences deepened his understanding of Bhutanese religious and artistic symbolism.

== Career and artistic style ==
In 2018, Phuntsho relocated to Japan, when he began merging traditional Bhutanese Thangka techniques with Japanese artistic influences, incorporating ultra-fine brushwork and piping techniques (chongbur), both traditional to Bhutanese art, while adopting the minimalist aesthetics and precision characteristic of Japanese art.

Phuntsho's artwork is particularly known for its detailed depictions of deities, mandalas, and spiritual symbols. The fusion of Bhutanese and Japanese styles creates a distinctive visual language, celebrated for its vibrancy and precision.

== Awards and recognition ==
Phuntsho Wangdi has received several awards:

- 2011: Grand Prize in a drawing competition at the National Institute of Zorig Chusum.
- 2019: Gallery Award at Art Revolution Taipei, a prestigious international art competition with over 4,282 entries from 81 countries.
- 2023: Winner of the International Artist Grand Prize at Art Revolution Taipei, making him the first Bhutanese artist to win this award. This achievement brought global attention to Bhutanese art, emphasizing phuntsho's unique contribution to the international art scene.

== Notable works ==
- The Wheel of Power (2023): Awarded the Grand Prix at Art Revolution Taipei, this piece exemplifies Phuntsho's skill in blending Bhutanese spiritual themes with Japanese influences.
- To the Pure Dimension (2024): Exhibited at Art Revolution Taipei 2024 as the winner of the 2023 edition, this artwork highlights Phuntsho's ability to blend traditional Bhutanese spiritual themes with contemporary artistic fusion.

== Other work ==
In 2026, Phuntsho contributed illustrations and vocals to Mimi Helay Helay, a Bhutanese folktale published as part of the SK56 series of English-language children’s picture books by the Lab Education Center, an English-language tutoring organization based in Japan.

== Website and exhibition platforms ==
In 2022, Phuntsho launched Gallery TAKCHU, an online platform showcasing his evolving works. The gallery, named after his hometown of Takchu, serves to promote traditional Bhutanese art worldwide. Phuntsho's work has been featured in exhibitions in Japan and has appeared in educational publications and television programs, further solidifying his presence in the global art community.
