= Qasim Zubair =

Emirati cricketer (born 1987)

Personal information
- Full name: Qasim Zubair
- Born: 31 August 1987 (age 39); Dubai, United Arab Emirates
- Batting: Right-handed
- Bowling: Right-arm medium fast
- Role: Bowler

Career statistics
Competition	First-class
Matches	3
Runs scored	60
Batting average	15.00
100s/50s	0/0
Top score	28*
Balls bowled	350
Wickets	3
Bowling average	76.66
5 wickets in innings	0
10 wickets in match	0
Best bowling	2/35
Catches/stumpings	2/0
- Source: CricketArchive, 24 September 2008

Qasim Zubair (born 31 August 1987) is an Emirati cricketer. A right-handed batsman and right-arm medium-fast bowler, he has played for the United Arab Emirates national cricket team since 2006, including three first-class matches.

== Biography ==
Born in Dubai in 1987, Qasim Zubair first represented the UAE at Under-15 level, playing in the Under-15 Asia Cup in Dubai in 2002. He played for the Under-19 team in the Youth Asia Cup in Karachi the following year, and in the ACC Under-17 Cup in India in 2004. His career at youth level ended with the ACC Under-19 Cup in Nepal in 2005.

He made his debut for the UAE senior team in 2006, when he played against Brunei in the ACC Trophy. He made his first-class debut in January 2007, playing in a 2006 ICC Intercontinental Cup match against Scotland. He played against Ireland in the same tournament the following month.

He toured Canada with the UAE later in 2007, playing against a Canadian Invitation XI and Ontario. He played a 2007-08 ICC Intercontinental Cup match against Bermuda in November. In 2008, he played for the UAE against Somerset and Yorkshire and most recently represented his country in the 2008 ACC Trophy Elite tournament, where he played against Afghanistan and Nepal. He is currently running his own business, Taier Al Jazeera Used Car Parts.
