= Maqsood Hussain (cricketer) =

Pakistani-born cricketer (born 1981)

Syed Maqsood Hussain
Personal information
- Born: 29 September 1981 (age 45); Sialkot, Pakistan
- Batting: Right-handed

Career statistics
Competition	List A
Matches	7
Runs scored	138
Batting average	19.71
100s/50s	0/1
Top score	70
Catches/stumpings	2/–
- Source: CricketArchive, 26 June 2016

Syed Maqsood Hussain (born 29 September 1981) is a Pakistani-born cricketer who played for the Oman national cricket team in List A cricket.
