= Awal Khan =

Pakistani-born cricketer (born 1974)

Awal Khan (born February 1, 1974, in Lahore) is a Pakistani-born cricketer who played for the Oman national cricket team. He is a right-hand batsman and right arm medium-fast bowler. He played for Oman in the 2005 ICC Trophy and the 2007 ICC World Cricket League Division Two.
