= Aamer Ali =

Pakistani cricketer

Personal information
- Full name: Syed Amir Ali
- Born: 24 November 1978 (age 47); Karachi, Sindh, Pakistan
- Batting: Right-handed
- Bowling: Right-arm off break
- Role: All-rounder

International information
- National side: Oman (2007–2016)
- T20I debut (cap 2): 25 July 2015 v Afghanistan
- Last T20I: 9 March 2016 v Ireland

Domestic team information
- Years: Team
- 1998: Karachi Whites
- 2000: Karachi Blues

Career statistics
Competition	T20I	FC	LA	T20
Matches	8	2	14	22
Runs scored	93	73	353	218
Batting average	23.25	18.25	39.22	14.53
100s/50s	0/0	0/0	0/2	0/0
Top score	32*	36	53	32*
Balls bowled	30	26	327	138
Wickets	1	0	8	6
Bowling average	39.00	–	37.62	31.33
5 wickets in innings	0	–	0	0
10 wickets in match	0	–	0	0
Best bowling	1/6	–	4/63	2/26
Catches/stumpings	1/–	4/–	3/–	3/–
- Source: CricketArchive, 10 March 2016

Syed Aamer Ali (Urdu: عامر علی; born 24 November 1978), known as Amir Ali, is a Pakistani-born all-rounder who plays for the Oman national cricket team. He made his debut for the Omani national side in 2007.

== Early days ==
Aamer was born in Karachi, Pakistan, and played briefly in Pakistani domestic competitions, making appearances at the first-class level for the Karachi Whites and the Karachi Blues, before emigrating to Oman. His debut for Oman came at the 2007 ACC Twenty20 Cup, hosted by Kuwait, and later in the year he played in the 2007 World Cricket League Division Two tournament in Namibia, where matches held list-A status. At the tournament, his best figures were 4/63 against the United Arab Emirates.

== International career ==
Aamer has since been a regular for Oman in international tournaments, playing further list-A matches at the 2009 World Cup Qualifier and Twenty20 matches at the 2012 and 2015 World Twenty20 Qualifiers. He made his Twenty20 International debut in Oman's fifth-place playoff at the 2015 World Twenty20 Qualifier, against Afghanistan.

Aamer was included in the Oman squad for the 2016 ICC World Twenty20. In the first match against Ireland, he scored match winning 32 runs from 17 balls. This included 5 fours and a six, and Oman won the match by 2 wickets.
