= Farhan Khan (Oman cricketer) =

Pakistani-born cricketer (born 1975)

Farhan Afzal Khan, born 19 October 1975 in Multan, is a Pakistani-born former cricketer who played for the Oman national cricket team. He is a right-handed batsman and right-arm medium-fast bowler. He made several appearances as a batsman in the 2005 Dallas ICC Trophy and has appeared in other List A cricket matches for the Oman national cricket team.
