= Akbar Baig =

Indian-Ugandan cricketer (born 1974)

Personal information
- Born: 5 May 1974 (age 52); India
- Batting: Right-handed
- Bowling: Right-arm medium

International information
- National side: Uganda

Career statistics
Competition	First-class
Matches	4
Runs scored	63
Batting average	7.87
100s/50s	0/0
Top score	19
Balls bowled	187
Wickets	4
Bowling average	28.50
5 wickets in innings	0
10 wickets in match	0
Best bowling	1/1
Catches/stumpings	4/–
- Source: CricketArchive, 5 December 2022

Akbar Mirza Baig (born 5 May 1974) is an Indian-born Ugandan cricketer. He has played in all four first-class games that Uganda has taken part in to date.
