= Davis Arinaitwe =

Ugandan cricketer (born 1987)

Personal information
- Full name: Davis Karashani Arinaitwe
- Born: 20 April 1987 (age 39); Mbarara, Uganda
- Batting: Right-handed
- Bowling: Right-arm medium

International information
- National side: Uganda (2007/08–2014/15)

Career statistics
Competition	FC	LA	T20
Matches	3	35	21
Runs scored	63	191	185
Batting average	15.75	8.30	12.33
100s/50s	0/0	0/0	0/0
Top score	30*	24	28
Balls bowled	572	1,382	414
Wickets	11	28	15
Bowling average	18.00	37.67	29.33
5 wickets in innings	0	0	0
10 wickets in match	0	0	0
Best bowling	4/32	4/53	3/21
Catches/stumpings	4/–	8/–	4/–
- Source: CricketArchive, 27 January 2025

Davis Karashani Arinaitwe (born April 20, 1987) is a Ugandan former cricketer who captained the Ugandan national team. He is a right-handed batsman and a medium-fast bowler. He represented the Uganda under-19s at the 2004 and 2006 Under-19 World Cups held in Bangladesh and Sri Lanka, respectively. He was born in the city of Mbarara and later played for Uganda in the ICC Intercontinental Cup, the ICC World Cup Qualifier, the ICC World Twenty20 Qualifier, and the World Cricket League.
