= Seren Waters =

Kenyan cricketer

Personal information
- Full name: Seren Robert Waters
- Born: 11 April 1990 (age 36); Nairobi, Kenya
- Nickname: Burundi
- Height: 6 ft 0 in (1.83 m)
- Batting: Right-handed
- Bowling: Right arm Legbreak
- Role: Batsman

International information
- National side: Kenya (2008-2011)
- ODI debut (cap 38): 18 October 2008 v Ireland
- Last ODI: 13 September 2011 v Netherlands
- ODI shirt no.: 5

Domestic team information
- Years: Team
- 2010: Durham MCCU

Career statistics
Competition	ODI	FC	LA
Matches	20	9	22
Runs scored	419	484	484
Batting average	20.95	32.26	23.04
100s/50s	0/2	1/2	0/3
Top score	74	157*	74
Balls bowled	18	102	18
Wickets	0	2	0
Bowling average	–	34.00	–
5 wickets in innings	0	0	0
10 wickets in match	0	0	0
Best bowling	-	1/18	-
Catches/stumpings	5/0	5/0	6/0
- Source: Cricinfo, 12 May 2017

Seren Robert Waters (born 11 April 1990 in Nairobi, Kenya) is a former Kenyan cricketer who plays for Surrey and Kenya. He is a skillful and bold opening batsman, who loves to face the first ball. He is strong off his legs and through the covers and his favourite shot is the pull shot.

== School times ==
He was born and lives in Kenya but has British nationality. Since Kenya is only an associate member of the ICC, Waters is also eligible to play for England. He was educated at Cranleigh School, England and captained the first XI cricket side for two years, playing alongside Stuart Meaker. In his last season at Cranleigh School, he finished with almost 900 runs.

He is a very able leg spinner and in his last season at Cranleigh School was second highest wicket taker.

== Domestic career ==
He scored a double century on debut for Surrey Under-17s in 2006, and in 2008 he made his Surrey second XI debut.

== International career ==
In October 2008 he was called into the Kenyan Cricket team, and made an immediate impression, scoring 75 against Ireland in the Intercontinental Cup at the Gymkhana in Nairobi, and more recently 74 against South Africa at Kimberley in a full One Day International (ODI).

Waters being a fielder and took two catches in the second ODI against South Africa. He caught out Gibbs and then de Villiers. These plays were notable because Waters was younger and had less experience than many other players on the field at the time.

Aside from playing for Surrey and Kenya, Waters also plays for the Old Cranleighan Cricket Club and for Weybridge Cricket Club. Waters went to Durham University and was named in the Kenyan squad for the 2011 ICC Cricket World Cup.
