= Elijah Otieno =

Kenyan cricketer (born 1988)

Personal information
- Full name: Elijah Otieno Asoyo
- Born: 3 January 1988 (age 38); Nairobi, Kenya
- Batting: Right-handed
- Bowling: Right arm medium-fast
- Role: Bowler

International information
- National side: Kenya (2007–present)
- ODI debut (cap 35): 18 October 2007 v Canada
- Last ODI: 30 January 2014 v Scotland
- T20I debut (cap 23): 22 February 2012 v Ireland
- Last T20I: 21 September 2022 v Uganda

Career statistics
Competition	ODI	T20I	FC	LA
Matches	26	31	13	53
Runs scored	49	27	59	137
Batting average	4.90	3.86	4.53	6.85
100s/50s	0/0	0/0	0/0	0/0
Top score	11	8	15*	18*
Balls bowled	954	633	1,690	2,135
Wickets	22	27	29	53
Bowling average	42.13	23.44	28.00	36.18
5 wickets in innings	0	0	0	1
10 wickets in match	0	0	0	0
Best bowling	4/33	3/16	4/44	5/21
Catches/stumpings	7/–	2/–	10/–	12/–
- Source: ESPNcricinfo, 8 July 2023

Elijah Otieno Asoyo (born 3 January 1988) is a Kenyan cricketer. A right arm medium-fast bowler, Otieno is a former Kenyan under-19 player.

== Domestic career ==
He made his senior debut playing in Kenya Select for the 2006/07 Logan Cup. A genuine tailender, Asoyo made five ducks in his first seven first-class innings. He is a player for the Sahara Elite League side The Eastern Aces.

== International career ==
He was selected for Kenya in the inaugural 2007 ICC World Twenty20 Championship. Although he did not play in any of the matches at the Twenty20 World Championships, Otieno was retained in the national team for the visit of the Canada national team, making his One Day International debut in the first match of the three-match series in Nairobi. He was later included in the Kenya national football team for their two Intercontinental Cup matches against Namibia and the United Arab Emirates in early 2008, making his tournament debut in the match against the UAE.

In September 2018, he was included in the Kenyan national team for the 2018 Africa T20 Cup. In October 2018, he was included in the Kenya team for the 2018 ICC World Cricket League Division Three in Oman. He played in the first two matches.

In May 2019, he was included in the Kenya team for the Regional Finals of the 2018–19 ICC T20 World Cup Africa Qualifier tournament in Uganda. In September 2019, he was included in the Kenya team for the 2019 ICC T20 World Cup Qualifier tournament in the United Arab Emirates. On 17 September 2021, Oiteno took a hat-trick against Uganda.

In October 2021, he was included in Kenya's team for the Regional Final of the 2021 ICC Men's T20 World Cup Africa Qualifier tournament in Rwanda. In June 2022, he was included in the Kenya team for the 2022 Uganda Cricket World Cup Challenge League B tournament. In Kenya's first match of the tournament, against Bermuda, Otieno took his first five-wicket haul in List A cricket.
