= Adnan Ilyas =

Pakistani-born cricketer (born 1984)

Personal information
- Full name: Adnan Ilyas
- Born: 30 December 1984 (age 41); Zafarwal, Punjab, Pakistan
- Nickname: Sulehri
- Batting: Right-handed
- Bowling: Right-arm medium
- Relatives: Aqib Ilyas (brother)

Career statistics
Competition	List A	Twenty20
Matches	18	5
Runs scored	393	76
Batting average	23.11	15.20
100s/50s	1/1	0/0
Top score	113	35
Balls bowled	128	–
Wickets	2	–
Bowling average	54.5	–
5 wickets in innings	0	–
10 wickets in match	0	–
Best bowling	1/29	–
Catches/stumpings	12/–	1/–
- Source: Cricinfo, 2013

Adnan "Sulehri" Ilyas (born 30 December 1984) is a Pakistani-born cricketer who plays for the Oman national cricket team. He has previously played for the Oman Under-17s.

Known to be a heavy scorer in international youth cricket, Ilyas has made scores of 199 not out against the Malaysia U-17 and 168 not out against the Hong Kong U-19 team. Oman qualified for the 2005 ICC Trophy, and Ilyas was selected in the squad, scoring a hundred in a warm-up win over Denmark in Belfast. However, in six games as an opener in the main tournament, Ilyas made 49 runs in six innings as opener, and only when he was relegated to batting at number three against Canada did he make 31.

Ilyas played three games during the 2006 ACC Trophy, where Oman were knocked out at the group stage after a loss to Bahrain in the final game. In the Bahrain game, Oman were set 284 and Ilyas scored 18 as opener, out of a total of 264.

He made his Twenty20 International debut for Oman against Hong Kong on 21 November 2015.
