= Hemal Mehta =

Indian-born Omani cricketer (born 1974)

Hemal Jayantilal Mehta (born 6 March 1974 in Calicut) is an Indian-born left-handed former cricketer who played for the Oman national cricket team and bowled a slow left-arm orthodox. He served as the captain of the Oman squad and led the team during the ICC Cricket World Cup Qualifier 2009 and the ACC Challenge Trophy 2009.

== Career ==
Mehta was captain on 21 January 2009 when Oman won the Asian Cricket Council Challenge Trophy. He almost took a hat trick during the match and finished with 3 for 22.

In April 2009, Mehta was announced as a squad member for Oman for the ICC World Cup Qualifiers. On 8 April 2009, he was one of the top scorers with 49 in the match against Uganda.

His debut T20 match was on 13 March 2012 against Italy. Through 2013 he played in various List A matches, his last was on 29 April 2013 against Bermuda. On 5 May 2013, Mehta played in the ICC World Cricket League Division Three match against Italy.
