= Tariq Hussain (cricketer) =

Pakistani-born cricketer (born 1976)

Syed Tariq Hussain (اردو: طارق حسین, born 23 April 1976 in Karachi) is a Pakistani-born cricketer who played for the Oman national cricket team. He is a right-handed batsman and left-arm slow bowler. He made several appearances as a batsman for the Oman national cricket team in the 2005 ICC Trophy. Up to 1996, he played first-class and List A cricket for Karachi Blues and Pakistan National Shipping Corporation.
