= Sultan Ahmed (Oman cricketer) =

Pakistan-born cricketer (born 1977)

Personal information
- Full name: Sultan Ahmed
- Born: 18 June 1977 (age 49); Karachi, Sindh, Pakistan
- Batting: Right-handed
- Role: Wicket-keeper

International information
- National side: Oman (2004–present)
- T20I debut (cap 9): 25 July 2015 v Afghanistan
- Last T20I: 9 March 2016 v Ireland

Domestic team information
- Years: Team
- 1999–2000: Karachi Whites
- 2000: Karachi Blues

Career statistics
Competition	T20I	FC	LA	T20
Matches	8	9	20	25
Runs scored	85	146	451	215
Batting average	14.16	16.22	26.52	16.53
100s/50s	0/0	0/0	0/3	0/0
Top score	37*	40	63	37*
Catches/stumpings	10/3	26/4	10/6	22/15
- Source: CricketArchive, 10 March 2016

Sultan Ahmed (born 18 June 1977, in Karachi) is a Pakistani-born cricketer who plays for the Oman national cricket team. He is a right-handed batsman and wicketkeeper. He played first-class cricket and List A cricket for Karachi teams and has subsequently made several appearances as a batsman in the 2005 ICC Trophy representing Oman. He was the captain of Oman team when they qualified for the 2016 ICC World Twenty20 tournament. He made his Twenty20 International debut for Oman against Afghanistan in the 2015 ICC World Twenty20 Qualifier tournament on 25 July 2015.

In January 2018, he was named as captain of Oman's squad for the 2018 ICC World Cricket League Division Two tournament.
