= 2011 ICC World Cricket League Division Three =

- Administrator: International Cricket Council
- Cricket format: Limited-overs cricket
- Tournament format: Round-robin
- Host: Hong Kong
- Champions: Hong Kong
- Participants: 6
- Matches: 18
- Player of the series: Peter Petricola (Ita)
- Most runs: Alessandro Bonora (Ita)
- Most wickets: Rarva Dikana (PNG)
- Official website: ICC World Cricket League

The 2011 ICC World Cricket League Division Three was a cricket tournament that took place between 22 and 29 January 2011. It formed part of the ICC World Cricket League. Hong Kong hosted the event and also emerged as the winners.

== Teams ==
The six teams that took part in the tournament were decided according to the results of the 2009 ICC World Cup Qualifier, the 2009 ICC World Cricket League Division Three and the 2010 ICC World Cricket League Division Four.

Team	Last outcome
Oman	Relegated from 2009 ICC World Cup Qualifier after finishing 11th
Denmark	Relegated from 2009 ICC World Cup Qualifier after finishing 12th
Papua New Guinea	Still from 2009 World Cricket League Division Three after finishing 3rd
Hong Kong	Still from 2009 World Cricket League Division Three after finishing 4th
United States	Promoted from 2010 ICC World Cricket League Division Four after finishing 1st
Italy	Promoted from 2010 ICC World Cricket League Division Four after finishing 2nd

== Squads ==
Denmark	Hong Kong	Italy	Oman	Papua New Guinea	United States
Michael Pedersen (C); Aftab Ahmed; Rizwan Mahmood; Basit Raja; Martin Pedersen; Jacob Larsen; Bashir Shah; Troels Thøgersen; Bobby Chawla; Yasir Iqbal; Frederik Klokker; Carsten Pedersen; David Borchersen; Naveed Mugfal	Najeeb Amar (C); Nadeem Ahmed; Irfan Ahmed; Waqas Barkat; Tabarak Dar; Khalid Butt; Asif Khan; Courtney Kruger; Roy Lamsam; Mark Chapman; Nizakat Mohammad; Moner Muhammad; Adil Mehmood; Mohammad Aizaz Khan	Alessandro Bonora (C); Roshendra Abewickrama; Din Alaud; Damian Crowley (Wk); Dilan Fernando; Gayashan Munasinghe; Thushara Kurukulasuriya; Damian Fernando; Andrew Northcote; Hayden Patrizi (Wk); Peter Petricola; Michael Raso; Hemantha Jayasena; Vince Pennazza	Hemal Mehta (C); Qais Al-Said; Sufyan Mehmood; Sultan Ahmed; Hemin Desai; Vaibhav Wategaonkar; Jatinder Singh; Rajesh Ranpura; Deep Trivedi; Awal Khan; Aamer Ali; Adnan Ilyas; Zeeshan Siddiqui; Khalid Rasheed	Rarua Dikana(C); Chris Amini; Assadollah Vala; Kila Pala; Loa Nou; Pipi Raho; Mahuru Dai; Raymond Haoda; Chris Kent; Jack Vare-Kevera; Tony Ura; Kapena Arua; Hitolo Areni; Jason Kila	Steve Massiah (C); Sushil Nadkarni; Aditya Thyagarajan; Carl Wright (Wk); Kevin Darlington; Usman Shuja; Lennox Cush; Muhammad Ghous; Orlando Baker; Rashard Marshall; Ritesh Kadu; Durale Forrest; Asif Mehmood Khan; Ryan Corns

== Fixtures ==
=== Group stage ===
==== Points table ====
Pos	Team	Pld	W	L	T	NR	Pts	NRR	Promotion or relegation
1	Papua New Guinea	5	4	1	0	0	8	1.114	Met in the final and promoted to Division Two for 2011
2	Hong Kong	5	3	2	0	0	6	0.833	Met in the final and promoted to Division Two for 2011
3	Oman	5	3	2	0	0	6	0.077	Met in the 3rd place playoff and remained in Division Three for 2013
4	Italy	5	2	3	0	0	4	−0.004	Met in the 3rd place playoff and remained in Division Three for 2013
5	United States	5	2	3	0	0	4	−0.661	Met in the 5th place playoff and relegated to Division Four for 2012
6	Denmark	5	1	4	0	0	2	−1.503	Met in the 5th place playoff and relegated to Division Four for 2012

==== Matches ====
22 January
Scorecard

Denmark; 227 (50 overs)	v	Italy; 228/3 (44.3 overs)
Rizwan Mahmood 50 (77); Damian Fernando 3/40 (10 overs)		Damian Crowley 53* (55); Martin Pedersen 1/41 (10 overs)

Italy won by 7 wickets
Hong Kong Cricket Club
Umpires: Kevin Bishop (HK) and Neil Harrison (Jap)
Player of the match: Peter Petricola (Ita)

- Italy won the toss and elected to field.

22 January
Scorecard

Hong Kong; 256/9 (50 overs)	v	United States; 257/3 (48.2 overs)
Roy Lamsam 83 (122); Kevin Darlington 2/40 (10 overs)		Steve Massiah 97* (121); Nizakat Khan 1/21 (4 overs)

United States of America won by 7 wickets
Kowloon Cricket Club
Umpires: Daryl Harper (Aus) and Upul Kaluhetti (Tha)
Player of the match: Steve Massiah (USA)

- United States of America won the toss and elected to field.

22 January
Scorecard

Papua New Guinea; 248/9 (50 overs)	v	Oman; 209 (47.1 overs)
Kila Pala 77 (77); Hemin Desai 4/50 (10 overs)		Hemal Mehta 123* (148); Hitolo Areni 3/32 (9 overs)

Papua New Guinea won by 39 runs
Mission Road Ground, Mong Kok, Hong Kong
Umpires: Vinay Kumar (Nep) and Shahul Hameed (Ina)
Player of the match: Hitolo Areni (PNG)

- Oman won the toss and elected to field.

23 January
Scorecard

Denmark; 193/6 (50 overs)	v	United States; 163 (39.5 overs)
Michael Pedersen 78* (123); Asif Khan 2/31 (10 overs)		Carl Wright 43 (51); Bobby Chawla 4/32 (9.5overs)

Denmark won by 30 runs
Mission Road Ground, Mong Kok, Hong Kong
Umpires: Kevin Bishop (HK) and Vinay Kumar (Nep)
Player of the match: Michael Pedersen (Den)

- United States of America won the toss and elected to field.

23 January
Scorecard

Hong Kong; 266 (50 overs)	v	Oman; 267/7 (49 overs)
Hussain Butt 81 (99); Khalid Rasheed 3/37 (9 overs)		Sultan Ahmed 70*; Irfan Ahmed 3/74 (10 overs)

Oman won by 3 wickets
Kowloon Cricket Club
Umpires: Sri Ganesh (Sin) and Shahul Hameed (Ina)
Player of the match: Sultan Ahmed (Oma)

- Oman won the toss and elected to field.

23 January
Scorecard

Papua New Guinea; 204 (48.4 overs)	v	Italy; 172 (43.2 overs)
Jason Kila 46 (68); Peter Petricola 4/38 (8.4 overs)		Hemantha Jayasena 30 (50); Rarva Dikana 3/24 (7 overs)

Papua New Guinea won by 32 runs
Hong Kong Cricket Club
Umpires: Daryl Harper (Aus) and Neil Harrison (Jap)
Player of the match: Rarva Dikana (PNG)

- Papua New Guinea won the toss and elected to bat.

25 January
Scorecard

Denmark; 102 (36 overs)	v	Hong Kong; 105/3 (24.4 overs)
Michael Pedersen 34 (60); Irfan Ahmed 4/23 (8 overs)		Courtney Kruger 40* (61); Jacob Larsen 2/34 (8 overs)

Hong Kong won by 7 wickets
Mission Road Ground, Mong Kok, Hong Kong
Umpires: Daryl Harper (Aus) and Shahul Hameed (Ina)
Player of the match: Irfan Ahmed (HK)

- Denmark won the toss and elected to bat.

25 January
Scorecard

Italy; 240/8 (50 overs)	v	Oman; 244/9 (48.5 overs)
Alessandro Bonora 124* (130); Hemal Mehta 3/41 (10 overs)		Awal Khan 81 (92); Gayashan Munasinghe 3/21 (8.4 overs)

Oman won by 1 wicket
Kowloon Cricket Club
Umpires: Kevin Bishop (HK) and Upul Kaluhetti (Tha)
Player of the match: Awal Khan (Oma)

- Italy won the toss and elected to bat.

25 January
Scorecard

United States; 44 (20.2 overs)	v	Papua New Guinea; 45/3 (6 overs)
Steve Massiah 18 (17); Rarva Dikana 4/1 (4.2 overs)		Christopher Kent 18* (10); Howard Johnson 2/23 (3 overs)

Papua New Guinea won by 7 wickets
Hong Kong Cricket Club
Umpires: Sri Ganesh (Sin) and Vinay Kumar (Nep)
Player of the match: Rarva Dikana (PNG)

- Papua New Guinea won the toss and elected to field.

26 January
Scorecard

Denmark; 112 (41.3 overs)	v	Papua New Guinea; 115/1 (22.3 overs)
Aftab Ahmed 39* (44); Christopher Kent 2/10 (2.3 overs)		Tony Ura 64* (65); Aftab Ahmed 1/32 (8 overs)

Papua New Guinea won by 9 wickets
Kowloon Cricket Club
Umpires: Daryl Harper (Aus) and Vinay Kumar (Nep)
Player of the match: Chris Ameni (PNG)

- Denmark won the toss and elected to bat.

26 January
Scorecard

Hong Kong; 236/9 (49.4 overs)	v	Italy; 235 (50 overs)
Waqas Barkat 55* (90); Gayashan Munasinghe 4/60 (9.4 overs)		Peter Petricola 104* (139); Nadeem Ahmed 2/47 (10 overs)

Hong Kong won by 1 wicket
Mission Road Ground, Mong Kok, Hong Kong
Umpires: Neil Harrison (Jap) and Upul Kaluhetti (Tha)
Player of the match: Peter Petricola (Ita)

- Italy won the toss and elected to bat.

26 January
Scorecard

Oman; 122 (37.4 overs)	v	United States; 123/8 (34 overs)
Sultan Ahmed 30 (51); Asif Khan 3/11 (5.4 overs)		Usman Shuja 43* (72); Rajesh Ranpura 4/40 (10 overs)

United States of America won by 2 wickets
Hong Kong Cricket Club
Umpires: Kevin Bishop (HK) and Sri Ganesh (Sin)
Player of the match: Usman Shuja (USA)

- United States of America won the toss and elected to field.

28 January
Scorecard

Denmark; 181 (47.2 overs)	v	Oman; 182/6 (37.4 overs)
Carsten Pedersen 53 (94); Khalid Rasheed 3/17 (10 overs)		Vaibhav Wategaonkar 54* (57); Jacob Larsen 4/59 (10 overs)

Oman won by 4 wickets
Kowloon Cricket Club
Umpires: Neil Harrison (Jap) and Shahul Hameed (Ina)
Player of the match: Hemin Desai (Oma)

- Oman won the toss and elected to field.

28 January
Scorecard

Hong Kong; 221 (47.2 overs)	v	Papua New Guinea; 128 (47.2 overs)
Hussain Butt 68 (102); Hitolo Areni 3/29 (9 overs)		Kila Pala 22 (18); Nadeem Ahmed 3/36 (10 overs)

Hong Kong won by 93 runs
Hong Kong Cricket Club
Umpires: Daryl Harper (Aus) and Sri Ganesh (Sin)
Player of the match: Hussain Butt (HK)

- Papua New Guinea won the toss and elected to field.

28 January
Scorecard

Italy; 225/6 (47.0 overs)	v	United States; 222/8 (50.0 overs)
Peter Petricola 69* (118); Kevin Darlington 3/51 (10 overs)		Steve Massiah 52 (68); Peter Petricola 4/38 (8 overs)

Italy won by 4 wickets
Mission Road Ground, Mong Kok, Hong Kong
Umpires: Vinay Kumar (Nep) and Upul Kaluhetti (Tha)
Player of the match: Peter Petricola (Ita)

- Italy won the toss and elected to field.

=== Playoffs ===
==== 5th place playoff ====
29 January
Scorecard

United States; 156 (43 overs)	v	Denmark; 240/6 (50 overs)
Durale Forrest 28 (58); Raja Javed 3/25 (7 overs)		Frederik Klokker 101* (138); Lennox Cush 2/34 (10 overs)

Denmark won by 84 runs
Mission Road Ground, Mong Kok, Hong Kong
Umpires: Kevin Bishop (HK) and Vinay Kumar (Nep)
Player of the match: Frederik Klokker (Den)

- Denmark won the toss and elected to bat.

==== 3rd place playoff ====
29 January
Scorecard

Oman; 255/2 (41 overs)	v	Italy; 251/7 (50 overs)
Adnan Ilyas 120* (105); Dilan Fernando 1/21 (7 overs)		Alessandro Bonora 81 (102); Rajesh Ranpura 3/41 (9 overs)

Oman won by 8 wickets
Hong Kong Cricket Club
Umpires: Neil Harrison (Jap) and Upul Kaluhetti (Tha)
Player of the match: Adnan Ilyas (Oma)

- Italy won the toss and elected to bat.

==== Final ====
29 January
Scorecard

Papua New Guinea; 202/9 (50 overs)	v	Hong Kong; 207/6 (47.1 overs)
Chris Amini 60 (91); Najeeb Amar 3/32 (9 overs)		Mark Chapman 70* (81); Rarva Dikana 3/40 (9.1 overs)

Hong Kong won by 4 wickets
Kowloon Cricket Club
Umpires: Sri Ganesh (Sin) and Shahul Hameed (Ina)
Player of the match: Mark Chapman (HK)

- Papua New Guinea won the toss and elected to bat.

== Statistics ==
=== Most runs ===
The top five highest run scorers (total runs) in the season are included in this table.

Player	Team	Runs	Inns	Avg	S/R	HS	100s	50s	4s	6s
Alessandro Bonora	Italy	286	6	57.20	75.06	124*	1	1	31	7
Vaibhav Wategaonkar	Oman	252	6	63.00	72.20	87*	0	3	30	4
Peter Petricola	Italy	226	5	113.00	65.50	104*	1	2	20	0
Hussain Butt	Hong Kong	211	6	35.16	65.73	81	0	2	18	2
Frederik Klokker	Denmark	202	6	40.40	64.53	101*	1	0	18	0

=== Most wickets ===
The following table contains the five leading wicket-takers of the season.

Player	Team	Wkts	Mts	Ave	S/R	Econ	BBI
Rarva Dikana	Papua New Guinea	16	6	10.43	17.8	3.50	4/1
Rajesh Ranpura	Oman	14	6	17.00	23.2	4.38	4/40
Gayashan Munasinghe	Italy	13	6	20.00	26.0	4.60	4/60
Hitolo Areni	Papua New Guinea	12	6	14.33	24.5	3.51	3/29
Peter Petricola	Italy	11	5	15.36	25.4	3.62	4/38

== Final placings ==
After the conclusion of the tournament the teams were distributed as follows:

Pos	Team	Status
1st	Hong Kong	Promoted to Division Two for 2011
2nd	Papua New Guinea	Promoted to Division Two for 2011
3rd	Oman	Remained in Division Three for 2013
4th	Italy	Remained in Division Three for 2013
5th	Denmark	Relegated to Division Four for 2012
6th	United States	Relegated to Division Four for 2012

== See also ==
- ICC World Cricket League
