= 2013 ICC World Cricket League Division Three =

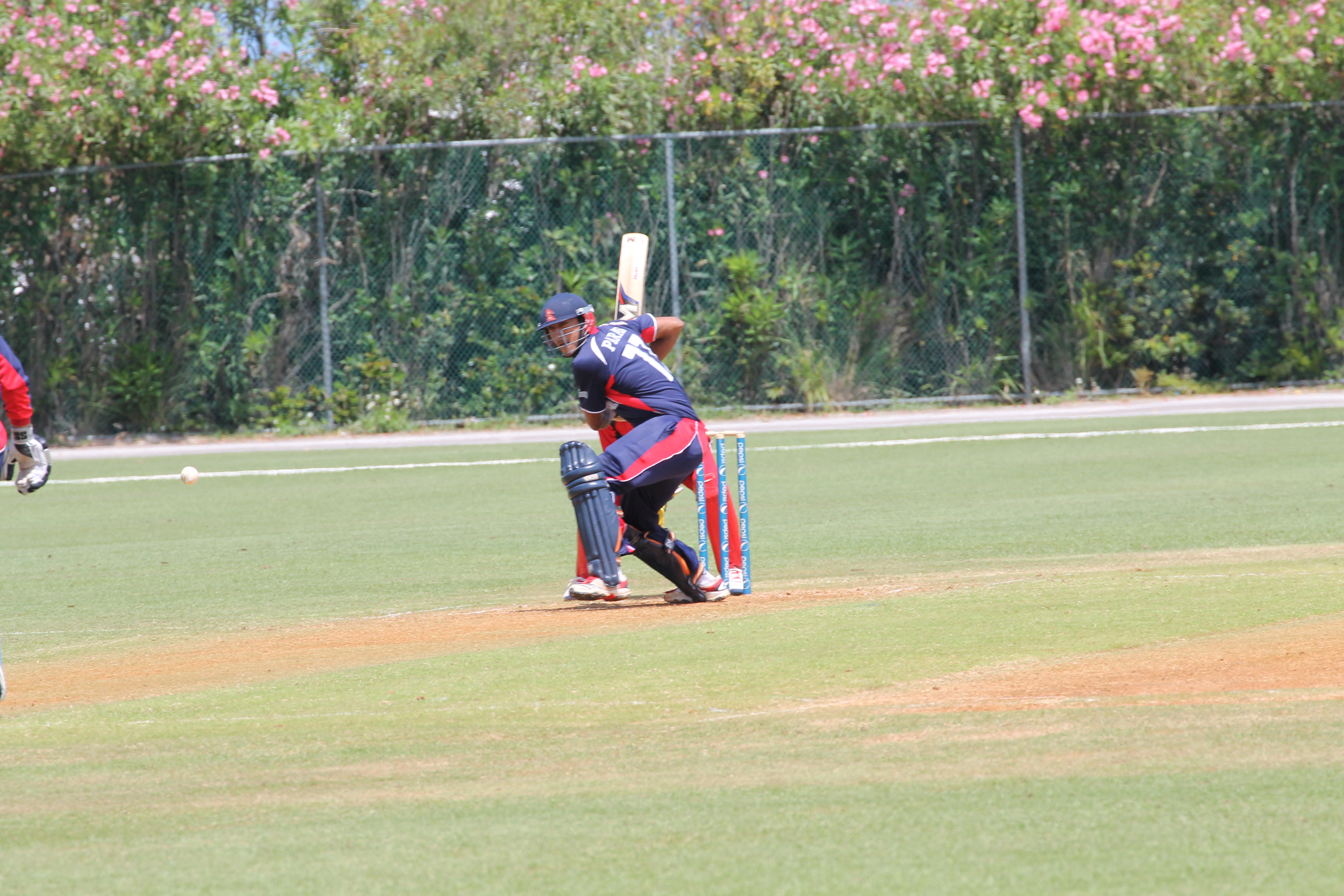
- Nepali captain Paras Khadka in 2013 ICC World Cricket League Division Three
- Administrator: International Cricket Council
- Cricket format: Limited-overs cricket
- Tournament format: Round-robin
- Host: Bermuda
- Champions: Nepal
- Participants: 6
- Matches: 18
- Player of the series: (Uganda) Davis Arinaitwe
- Most runs: (United States) Steven Taylor (274)
- Most wickets: (Oman) Munis Ansari (16)
- Official website: ICC World Cricket League

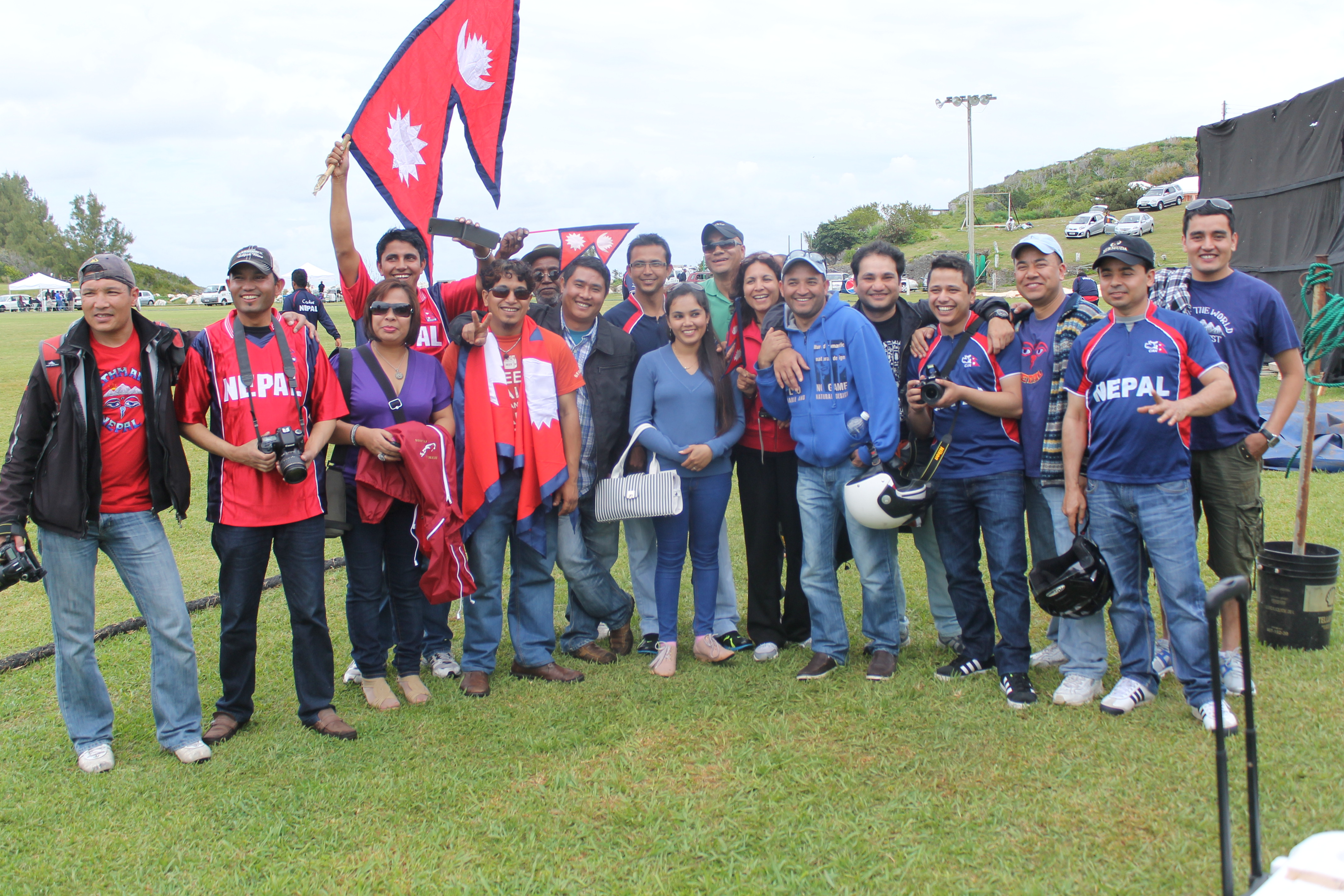
Nepali cricket Fans in Bermuda during 2013 ICC World Cricket League Division Three.

The 2013 ICC World Cricket League Division Three was a cricket tournament which took place from 28 April to 5 May 2013 in Bermuda. It formed part of the ICC World Cricket League and qualifying for the 2015 World Cup.

Nepal were the pre-tournament favourites, but they lost against USA and Uganda in their first two matches. On the other hand, USA and Uganda made solid starts. Uganda remained unbeaten in their first four matches to comfortably secure one of the two available places in the 2014 World Cup Qualifier.

In the fifth round of the league, three teams remained in contention for the second qualifying spot, USA having won 3 out of 4 matches and Bermuda & Nepal each having won 2 out of 4. USA could guarantee progress by defeating the hosts Bermuda, but for Nepal to proceed, they had to defeat Italy by a heavy margin and also rely on a Bermuda victory over the USA. In the end, exactly that happened and Nepal went through to the 2014 World Cup Qualifier over USA and hosts Bermuda on net run rate.

== Teams ==
The six teams that took part in the tournament were decided according to the results of the 2011 ICC World Cricket League Division Two, the 2011 ICC World Cricket League Division Three and the 2012 ICC World Cricket League Division Four.

Key
†	Denotes relegated teams
†	Denotes unmoved teams
†	Denotes promoted teams

Team	Last outcome
Uganda	5th in 2011 ICC World Cricket League Division Two, UAE
Bermuda	6th in 2011 ICC World Cricket League Division Two, UAE
Oman	3rd in 2011 ICC World Cricket League Division Three, Hong Kong
Italy	4th in 2011 ICC World Cricket League Division Three, Hong Kong
Nepal	1st in 2012 ICC World Cricket League Division Four, Malaysia
United States	2nd in 2012 ICC World Cricket League Division Four, Malaysia

== Squads ==
Bermuda	Italy	Nepal	Oman	Uganda	United States
Steven Outerbridge (C); Jason Anderson; Lionel Cann; Jekon Edness; Treadwell Gibbons; David Hemp; Malachi Jones; Greg Maybury; Tre Manders; Delray Rawlins; Jacobi Robinson; Curt Stovell; Rodney Trott; Janeiro Tucker	Alessandro Bonora (C); Damian Crowley; Gayashan Munasinghe; Luis di Giglio; Dilan Fernando; Fida Hussain; Dinidu Marage; Damian Fernando; Andy Northcote; Hayden Patrizi; Vince Pennazza; Peter Petricola; Michael Raso; Carl Sandri	Paras Khadka (C); Pradeep Airee; Prithu Baskota; Binod Bhandari; Amrit Bhattarai; Shakti Gauchan; Subash Khakurel(Wk); Gyanendra Malla; Anil Mandal; Basanta Regmi; Sanjam Regmi; Chandra Sawad; Sharad Vesawkar; Rahul Vishwakarma	Vaibhav Wategaonkar (C); Sultan Ahmed; Qais Al Said; Syed Amir Ali; Munis Ansari; Ghazanfar Iqbal; Syed Aamir Kaleem; Ajay Lalcheta; Sufyan Mahmood; Hemal Mehta; Nileshkumar Parmar; Rajesh Ranpura; Zeeshan Siddiqui; Jatinder Singh	Davis Arinaitwe(C); Benjamin Musoke; Roger Mukasa; Laurence Sematimba; Frank Nsubuga; Brian Masaba; Arthur Kyobe; Charles Waiswa; Michael Ndiko; Deusdedit Muhumuza; Henry Senyondo; Arthur Ziraba; Jonathan Ssebanja; Richard Okia	Steve Massiah (C); Danial Ahmed; Timroy Allen; Orlando Baker (Wk); Barrington Bartley; Akeem Dodson; Muhammad Ghous; Elmore Hutchinson; Naseer Jamali; Rashard Marshall; Neil McGarrell; Sushil Nadkarni; Japen Patel; Steven Taylor

== Points table ==
Pos	Team	Pld	W	L	T	NR	Pts	NRR	
1	Uganda	5	4	1	0	0	8	1.091	Met in the final and qualified for the 2014 World Cup Qualifier
2	Nepal	5	3	2	0	0	6	0.715	Met in the final and qualified for the 2014 World Cup Qualifier
3	United States	5	3	2	0	0	6	0.456	Met in the 3rd place playoff and remained in Division Three for 2014
4	Bermuda	5	3	2	0	0	6	−0.683	Met in the 3rd place playoff and remained in Division Three for 2014
5	Oman	5	2	3	0	0	4	0.048	Met in the 5th place playoff and relegated to Division Four for 2014
6	Italy	5	0	5	0	0	0	−1.675	Met in the 5th place playoff and relegated to Division Four for 2014

Source: ESPNcricinfo

== Matches ==
28 April
Scorecard

United States; 366/6 (50.0 overs)	v	Nepal; 272 (49.5 overs)
Steven Taylor 162 (102); Neil McGarrell 2/46 (10 overs)		Paras Khadka 73 (64); Basanta Regmi 3/42 (9.5 overs)

USA won by 94 runs
Somerset
Umpires: Steven Douglas (Ber) and Viswanadan Kalidas (Mal)
Player of the match: Steven Taylor (USA)

- Nepal won the toss and elected to field.

28 April
Scorecard

Uganda; 222/7 (50 overs)	v	Bermuda; 108 (43.3 overs)
Arthur Kyobe 53 (112); Rodney Trott 2/34 (10 overs)		Curt Stovell 19 (45); Henry Ssenyondo 4/23 (8.3 overs)

Uganda won by 114 runs
National Stadium, Hamilton
Umpires: Niels Bagh (Den) and Courtney Young (Cay)
Player of the match: Arthur Kyobe (Uga)

- Uganda won the toss and elected to bat.

28 April
Scorecard

Italy; 110 (38.2 overs)	v	Oman; 112/3 (29.1 overs)
Peter Petricola 21 (26); Aamir Kaleem 4/15 (8 overs)		Vaibhav Wategaonkar 31* (61); Damian Crowley 1/11 (5 overs)

Oman won by 7 wickets
St. George's
Umpires: Richard Illingworth (Eng) and Silvan Taylor (USA)
Player of the match: Aamir Kaleem (Oma)

- Italy won the toss and elected to bat.

29 April
Scorecard

Nepal; 116 (44.2 overs)	v	Uganda; 117/4 (27 overs)
Pradeep Airee 24 (29); Davis Arinaitwe 3/12 (9.2 overs)		Roger Mukasa 49 (74); Basanta Regmi 2/33 (9 overs)

Uganda won by 6 wickets
Somerset
Umpires: Roger Dill (Ber) and Courtney Young (Cay)
Player of the match: Davis Arinaitwe (Uga)

- Nepal won the toss and elected to bat.

29 April
Scorecard

Bermuda; 194 (44.1 overs)	v	Oman; 160 (41.5 overs)
Treadwell Gibbons 33 (45); Aamer Ali 3/34 (10 overs)		Aamer Ali 58 (80); Malachi Jones 3/29 (10 overs)

Bermunda won by 34 runs
Hamilton
Umpires: Niels Bagh (Den) and Silvan Taylor (USA)

- Oman won the toss and elected to field.

29 April
Scorecard

United States; 254/8 (50 overs)	v	Italy; 180 (45.3 overs)
Sushil Nadkarni 73 (121); Dilan Fernando 3/54 (8 overs)		Carl Sandri 41 (49); Neil McGarrell 4/44 (9.3 overs)

United States won by 74 runs
St. George's
Umpires: Steven Douglas (Ber) and Richard Illingworth (Eng)
Player of the match: Timroy Allen (USA)

- United States won the toss and elected to bat.

1 May
Scorecard

Bermuda; 106 (38.2 overs)	v	Nepal; 107/2 (11.2 overs)
Steven Outerbridge 29 (77); Paras Khadka 4/31 (10 overs)		Paras Khadka 46* (27); Rodney Trott 2/28 (3 overs)

Nepal won by 8 wickets
Hamilton
Umpires: Richard Illingworth (Eng) and Viswanadan Kalidas (Mal)
Player of the match: Paras Khadka (Nep)

- Nepal won the toss and elected to field.

1 May
Scorecard

Uganda; 114/9 (50 overs)	v	Italy; 91 (35.3 overs)
Richard Okia 15* (49); Carl Sandri 4/26 (10 overs)		Andy Northcote 28 (72); Davis Arinaitwe 4/20 (10 overs)

Uganda won by 23 runs
St. George's
Umpires: Steven Douglas (Ber) and Courtney Young (Cay)
Player of the match: Davis Arinaitwe (Uga)

- Italy won the toss and elected to field.

1 May
Scorecard

Oman; 175 (49.4 overs)	v	United States; 176/8 (39.1 overs)
Munis Ansari 26* (22); Neil McGarrell 3/30 (10 overs)		Rashard Marshall 72* (83); Aamir Kaleem 3/34 (10 overs)

United States won by 2 wickets
Somerset
Umpires: Niels Bagh (Den) and Roger Dill (Ber)

- United States won the toss and elected to field.

2 May
Scorecord

Nepal; 160/9 (50 overs)	v	Oman; 132 (46.4 overs)
Gyanendra Malla 34 (49); Munis Ansari 3/26 (10 overs)		Vaibhav Wategaonkar 27 (68); Basanta Regmi 2/18 (9 overs)

Nepal won by 28 runs
St. George's
Umpires: Niels Bagh (Den) and Steven Douglas (Ber)
Player of the match: Gyanendra Malla (Nep)

- Oman won the toss and elected to field.

2 May
Scorecard

Bermuda; 284 (50 overs)	v	Italy; 224 (44 overs)
Lionel Cann 113 (48); Dilan Fernando 3/42 (7 overs)		Carl Sandri 66 (34); Malachi Jones 3/51 (9 overs)

Bermuda won by 60 runs
Hamilton
Umpires: Viswanadan Kalidas (Mal) and Silvan Taylor (USA)

- Bermuda won the toss and elected to bat.

2 May
Scorecard

Uganda; 175 (49.5 overs)	v	United States; 93 (39.1 overs)
Lawrence Sematimba 44 (91); Timroy Allen 2/37 (7 overs)		Steve Massiah 24 (46); Roger Mukasa 3/29 (10 overs)

Uganda won by 82 runs
Somerset
Umpires: Roger Dill (Ber) and Richard Illingworth (Eng)
Player of the match: Lawrence Sematimba (Uga)

- Uganda won the toss and elected to bat.

4 May
Scorecard

Nepal; 129/2 (14.5 overs)	v	Italy; 127/9 (50.0 overs)
Subash Khakurel 47 (35); Fida Hussain 1/13 (0.5 overs)		Carl Sandri 39 (65); Rahul Vishwakarma 3/28 (10 overs)

Nepal won by 8 wickets
St. George's
Player of the match: Rahul Vishwakarma (Nep)

- Nepal won the toss and elected to field.

4 May
Scorecard

Bermuda; 221/5 (44.4 overs)	v	United States; 220/9 (50.0 overs)
Douglas 89 (75); Malachi Jones 3/48 (10.0 Overs)		Akeem Dodson 50 (93)

Bermuda won by 5 wickets
Hamilton
Umpires: Richard Illingworth (Eng) and Niels Bagh (Den)

- United States won the toss and elected to bat.

4 May
Scorecard

Oman; 164/3 (39.0 overs)	v	Uganda; 163/9 (50.0 overs)
Zeeshan Siddiqui 69 (120); Munis Ansari 2/14 (10 Overs)		Arthur Kyobe 42 (56); Frank Nsubuga 1/22 (9.0 Overs)

Oman won by 7 wickets
Somerset
Umpires: Roger Dill (Ber) and Viswanadan Kalidas (Mal)

- Uganda won the toss and elected to bat.

=== Playoffs ===
==== 5th place playoff ====
5 May
Scorecard

Oman; 208/5 (44.5 overs)	v	Italy; 207 (48.4 overs)
Zeeshan Siddiqui 64 (68); Munis Ansari 4/72 (9.4 Overs)		Alessandro Bonora 42 (87); Damian Crowley 2/39 (10.0 Overs)

Oman won by 5 wickets
Somerset
Umpires: Roger Dill (Ber) and Silvan Taylor (USA)

- Italy won the toss and elected to bat.

==== 3rd place playoff ====
5 May
Scorecard

United States; 271/7 (50.0 overs)	v	Bermuda; 241 (48.4 overs)
Steven Taylor 97 (95); Muhammad Ghous 4/43 (10.0 overs)		David Hemp 45 (60); Curt Stovell 4/38 (9.0 overs)

United States won by 30 runs
St. George's
Umpires: Richard Illingworth (Eng) and Courtney Young (Cay)

- United States won the toss and elected to bat.

==== Final ====
5 May
Scorecard

Uganda; 151/8 (50.0 overs)	v	Nepal; 153/5 (39.2 overs)
Deusdedit Muhumuza 28 (70); Basanta Regmi 2/24 (10 overs)		Pradeep Airee 60 (95); Henry Ssenyondo 2/29 (7 overs)

Nepal won by 5 wickets
National Stadium, Hamilton
Umpires: Steven Douglas (Ber) and Viswanadan Kalidas (Mal)
Player of the match: Pradeep Airee (Nep)

- Uganda won the toss and elected to bat.

== Statistics ==
=== Most runs ===
The top five highest run scorers (total runs) in the season are included in this table.

Player	Team	Runs	Inns	Avg	S/R	HS	100s	50s	4s	6s
Steven Taylor	United States	274	6	45.66	117.59	162	1	1	26	13
Peter Petricola	Italy	192	6	32.00	106.66	66	0	1	20	6
Paras Khadka	Nepal	176	6	35.20	106.66	73	0	1	20	6
Orlando Baker	United States	161	6	26.83	59.19	72	0	1	14	1
Lionel Cann	Bermuda	157	5	39.25	117.16	113	1	0	8	12

=== Most wickets ===
The following table contains the five leading wicket-takers of the season.

Player	Team	Wkts	Mts	Ave	S/R	Econ	BBI
Munis Ansari	Oman	16	6	14.81	25.3	20.6	4/72
Aamir Kaleem	Oman	13	6	11.92	25.3	25.3	4/15
Basanta Regmi	Nepal	12	6	2.81	21.0	29.0	3/20
Neil McGarrell	United States	12	5	14.58	21.2	24.5	4/44
Davis Arinaitwe	Uganda	10	6	14.30	23.5	31.4	4/20

== Final Placings ==
After the conclusion of the tournament the teams were distributed as follows:

Pos	Team	Status
1st	Nepal	Promoted to the 2014 World Cup Qualifier.
2nd	Uganda	Promoted to the 2014 World Cup Qualifier.
3rd	United States	Remained in Division Three for 2014
4th	Bermuda	Remained in Division Three for 2014
5th	Oman	Relegated to Division Four for 2014
6th	Italy	Relegated to Division Four for 2014
