= Damian Crowley =

Italian cricketer

Personal information
- Full name: Damian Graham Crowley
- Born: 20 May 1989 (age 37); Cape Town, Cape Province, South Africa
- Batting: Right-handed
- Bowling: Slow left-arm orthodox
- Role: Batsman, occasional wicket-keeper

International information
- National side: Italy (2010–2017)

Career statistics
| Competition | Twenty20 |
|---|---|
| Matches | 17 |
| Runs scored | 328 |
| Batting average | 21.86 |
| 100s/50s | 0/2 |
| Top score | 61* |
| Balls bowled | 302 |
| Wickets | 17 |
| Bowling average | 18.64 |
| 5 wickets in innings | 0 |
| 10 wickets in match | 0 |
| Best bowling | 4/18 |
| Catches/stumpings | 5/– |
- Source: CricketArchive, 8 May 2015

Damian Graham Crowley (born 20 May 1989) is a South African cricketer of Italian descent. He made his debut for the Italian national side in August 2010, and has since captained Italy at several tournaments. Crowley is a right-handed batsman who bowls slow left-arm orthodox spin.

== Playing career ==
Born in Cape Town, Crowley later moved to England, where he played county cricket for the Nottinghamshire Second XI in 2008 and 2009, but unable to force his way into the county first eleven. Although he had an Italian background through his grandmother (an immigrant to South Africa from Rimini), Crowley did not meet ICC eligibility requirements for Italy until 2010. Soon after, he was selected as part of Italy's squad for the 2010 World Cricket League Division Four tournament, which was hosted by Italy. He made his debut for Italy during the tournament against Nepal and went on to make a further five appearances during it, helping Italy earn promotion to the 2011 World Cricket League Division Three. Division Three was played in Hong Kong in January 2011, with Crowley selected as part of Italy's thirteen man squad. He played in all six of Italy's matches in the tournament, scoring 134 runs at an average of 26.80, with a high score of 53 not out. This was his only half century in the tournament and came against Denmark.

In July 2011, Crowley played in the European T20 Championship in Jersey and Guernsey, which saw Italy end the tournament as runners-up to Denmark. This result qualified them to take part in the World Twenty20 Qualifier in the United Arab Emirates in March 2012. Crowley was selected as part of Italy's fourteen man squad for the qualifier. He made his Twenty20 debut during the tournament against Oman. He made eight further appearances during the tournament, the last of which came against Kenya. Having previously kept wicket for Italy, this role was instead undertaken by Alessandro Bonora and Hayden Patrizi, therefore allowing Crowley the opportunity to bowl regularly throughout the tournament. In his nine matches, he took 13 wickets at a bowling average of 12.46, with best figures of 4/18. He ended the tournament as Italy's joint leading wicket-taker alongside Carl Sandri. With the bat, he scored 137 runs at an average of 17.12, with a high score of 44. Italy finished the tournament in tenth place and therefore missed out on qualification for the 2012 World Twenty in Sri Lanka.

In April 2013, he was selected in Italy's fourteen man squad for the World Cricket League Division Three in Bermuda.

In September 2017, he scored the most runs in the 2017 ICC World Cricket League Division Five tournament, with a total of 308 runs in four matches.
