= Petricola (surname) =

Petricola is a surname. Notable people with the surname include:

- Emily Petricola (born 1980), Australian Paralympic cyclist
- Peter Petricola (born 1983), Italian cricketer
