= 2010 ICC World Cricket League Division Four =

True

- Administrator: International Cricket Council
- Cricket format: One Day International
- Tournament format: Round-robin
- Host: Italy
- Champions: United States
- Participants: 6
- Matches: 18
- Player of the series: (United States) Sushil Nadkarni
- Most runs: (Italy) Peter Petricola (235)
- Most wickets: (Nepal) Basanta Regmi (14)
- Official website: ICC World Cricket League

The 2010 ICC World Cricket League Division Four was a cricket tournament that took place from 14 to 21 August 2010 in Italy. It formed part of the World Cricket League competition administered by the International Cricket Council, the international governing body for cricket. The United States won the tournament, defeating Italy by 8 wickets in the final.

== Teams ==
Key
†	Denotes relegated teams
†	Denotes unmoved teams
†	Denotes promoted teams

Team	Last outcome
Cayman Islands	5th in 2009 ICC World Cricket League Division Three, Argentina
Argentina	6th in 2009 ICC World Cricket League Division Three, Argentina
Italy	3rd in 2008 ICC World Cricket League Division Four, Tanzania
Tanzania	4th in 2008 ICC World Cricket League Division Four, Tanzania
Nepal	1st in 2010 ICC World Cricket League Division Five, Nepal
United States	2nd in 2010 ICC World Cricket League Division Five, Nepal

== Squads ==
Argentina	Cayman Islands	Italy	Nepal	Tanzania	United States
Esteban MacDermott (C); Grant Dugmore; Agustin Casime; Alejandro Ferguson (Wk); Pablo Ferguson; Donald Forrester; Tomas Francis; Carlos Gibson; Diego Lord; Lucas Paterlini; Matias Paterlini; Pablo Ryan; Gary Savage; Martin Siri	Saheed Mohamed (C); Pearson Best; Ryan Bovell; Kervin Ebanks; Paul Chin (Wk); Marlon Bryan; Ricardo Roach; Jalon Linton; Abali Hoilett; Conroy Wright; Alessandro Morris; Kevin Bazil; Ramon Sealy; Ronald Ebanks	Alessandro Bonora (C); Roshendra Abewickrama; Alauddin; Dilan Fernando; Damian Crowley (Wk); Gayashan Munasinghe; Thushara Kurukulasuriya; Damian Fernando; Andrew Northcote; Nicholas Northcote (Wk); Hayden Patrizi (Wk); Peter Petricola; Michael Raso; Hemantha Jayasena	Paras Khadka (C); Gyanendra Malla; Shakti Gauchan; Sharad Vesawkar; Mahesh Chhetri (Wk); Anil Mandal; Amrit Bhattarai; Basanta Regmi; Binod Das; Sanjam Regmi; Rahul Vishwakarma; Mehboob Alam; Manjeet Shrestha; Pradeep Airee; Roy Dias (Coach)	Hamisi Abdallah (C); Abhik Patwa (Wk); Hasnain Damji; Khalil Rehemtulla; Seif Khalifa; Riziki Kiseto; Kassim Nassoro; Issa Kikasi (Wk); Enjo Kiongozi; Shaheed Danani; Rashidi Amiri; Benson Mwita; Harsh Ramaiya; Ally Kimote	Steve Massiah (C); Sushil Nadkarni; Aditya Thyagarajan; Adrian Gordon; Carl Wright (Wk); Kevin Darlington; Usman Shuja; Lennox Cush; Muhammad Ghous; Nasir Javed; Orlando Baker; Rashard Marshall; Steven Taylor; Timroy Allen; Clayton Lambert (Coach)

== Fixtures ==
=== Group stage ===
==== Points table ====
Pos	Team	Pld	W	L	T	NR	Pts	NRR	Promotion or relegation
1	United States	5	4	1	0	0	8	2.005	Met in the final and promoted to Division Three for 2011
2	Italy	5	4	1	0	0	8	1.130	Met in the final and promoted to Division Three for 2011
3	Nepal	5	3	2	0	0	6	0.691	Met in the 3rd place playoff and remained in Division Four for 2012
4	Tanzania	5	3	2	0	0	6	−0.960	Met in the 3rd place playoff and remained in Division Four for 2012
5	Cayman Islands	5	1	4	0	0	2	−1.042	Met in the 5th place playoff and relegated to Division Five for 2012
6	Argentina	5	0	5	0	0	0	−1.991	Met in the 5th place playoff and relegated to Division Five for 2012

==== Matches ====
14 August
(Scorecard)

Nepal; 51/2 (14 overs)	v	United States
Anil Mandal 30* (48); Kevin Darlington 1/14 (6 overs)

No result.
Ovale di Rastignano, Pianoro
Umpires: Louis Fourie (Ireland) & Charlie Alexander McElwee (Ireland)

- United States won the toss and chose to field.
- Match abandoned due to rain — replayed on 19 August.

14 August
(Scorecard)

Italy	v	Cayman Islands

Match abandoned without a ball bowled.
Centro Sportivo Ca'Nova, Medicina
Umpires: Keith Smith (Ireland) & Richard Paul Smith (Germany)

- No toss
- Match abandoned due to rain — replayed on 19 August.

14 August
(Scorecard)

Argentina; 36/4 (18.2 overs)	v	Tanzania
Matias Paterlini 12 (55); Khalil Rehmtullah 3/13 (8 overs)

No result.
Centro Sportivo Dozza, Navile
Umpires: Ian Gould (England) & Courtney Young (Cayman Islands)

- Tanzania won the toss and chose to field.
- Match abandoned due to rain — replayed on 19 August.

15 August
(Scorecard)

Italy; 71 (33.1/40 overs)	v	Nepal; 77/5 (25/40 overs)
Hemantha Jayasena 16 (38); Amrit Bhattarai 3/8 (6.1 overs)		Mahesh Chhetri 19 (48); Hemantha Jayasena 2/11 (4 overs)

Nepal won by 5 wickets.
Ovale di Rastignano, Pianoro
Umpires: Andy Bisson (Guernsey) & Courtney Young (Cayman Islands)
Player of the match: Shakti Gauchan (Nepal)

- Nepal won the toss and chose to field.
- Match shortened to 40 overs per side due to rain.

15 August
(Scorecard)

Argentina	v	Cayman Islands

Match abandoned without a ball bowled.
Centro Sportivo Ca'Nova, Medicina
Umpires: Ian Gould (England) & Richard Paul Smith (Germany)

- No toss
- Match abandoned due to rain — replayed on 16 August.

15 August
(Scorecard)

Tanzania; 128 (38.1 overs)	v	United States; 132/0 (12.4 overs)
Kassim Nassoro 49* (37); Muhammad Ghous 4/15 (10 overs)		Sushil Nadkarni 68* (31); Harsh Ramaiya 0/13 (1.4 overs)

United States won by 10 wickets.
Centro Sportivo Dozza, Navile
Umpires: Louis Fourie (Ireland) and Keith Smith (Ireland)
Player of the match: Sushil Nadkarni (USA)

- United States won the toss and chose to field.

16 August
(Scorecard)

Argentina; 160/8 (50 overs)	v	Cayman Islands; 164/5 (50 overs)
Pablo Ferguson 37 (121); Marlon Bryan 3/32 (10 overs)		Pearson Best 55 (32); Lucas Paterlini 2/38 (7 overs)

Cayman Islands won by 5 wickets.
Ovale di Rastignano, Pianoro
Umpires: Ian Gould (England) & Richard Smith (Germany)
Player of the match: Ryan Bovell (Cayman Islands)

- Cayman Islands won the toss and chose to field.
- Replay of match previously scheduled for 15 August.

17 August
(Scorecard)

Italy; 262 (49.2 overs)	v	Argentina; 202 (45.1 overs)
Andy Northcote 73 (87); Pablo Ryan 4/49 (9.2 overs)		Grant Dugmore 59 (76); Hemantha Jayasena 4/50 (10 overs)

Italy won by 60 runs.
Ovale di Rastignano, Pianoro
Umpires: Louis Fourie (Ireland) & Courtney Young (Cayman Islands)
Player of the match: Andy Northcote (Italy)

- Italy won the toss and chose to bat.

17 August
(Scorecard)

Tanzania; 117 (47.3 overs)	v	Nepal; 108 (44.1 overs)
Seif Khalifa 46 (82); Rahul Vishwakarma 5/18 (7.3 overs)		Gyanendra Malla 41 (90); Riziki Kiseto 3/19 (8.1 overs)

Tanzania won by 9 runs.
Centro Sportivo Ca'Nova, Medicina
Umpires: Charlie Alexander McElwee (Ireland) and Richard Smith (Germany)
Player of the match: Seif Khalifa (Tanzania)

- Nepal won the toss and chose to field.

17 August
(Scorecard)

Cayman Islands; 181/9 (50 overs)	v	United States; 182/1 (29.3 overs)
Ronald Ebanks 46 (39); Nasir Javed 3/29 (10 overs)		Sushil Nadkarni 84* (92); Marlon Bryan 1/22 (3 overs)

United States won by 9 wickets.
Centro Sportivo Dozza, Navile
Umpires: Andy Bisson (Guernsey) and Ian Gould (England)
Player of the match: Sushil Nadkarni (USA)

- Cayman Islands won the toss and chose to bat.

18 August
(Scorecard)

Tanzania; 197/9 (50 overs)	v	Cayman Islands; 154 (48.3 overs)
Abhik Patwa 39 (47); Ryan Bovell 2/43 (8 overs)		Ryan Bovell 39 (70); Khalil Rehmtullah 3/28 (7.3 overs)

Tanzania won by 43 runs.
Ovale di Rastignano, Pianoro
Umpires: Andy Bisson (Guernsey) & Louis Fourie (Ireland)
Player of the match: Kassim Nassoro (Tanzania)

- Tanzania won the toss and chose to bat.

18 August
Scorecard

Italy; 212/9 (50 overs)	v	United States; 161 (41.2 overs)
Peter Petricola 85 (127); Kevin Darlington 3/36 (9 overs)		Aditya Thyagarajan 51 (92); Gayashan Munasinghe 3/29 (10 overs)

Italy won by 51 runs.
Centro Sportivo Ca'Nova, Medicina
Umpires: Charlie Alexander McElwee (Ireland) & Courtney Young (Cayman Islands)
Player of the match: Peter Petricola (Italy)

- Italy won the toss and chose to bat.

18 August
(Scorecard)

Argentina; 193/8 (50 overs)	v	Nepal; 194/2 (32.4 overs)
Alejandro Ferguson 83 (73); Mehboob Alam 2/12 (5 overs)		Anil Mandal 60 (58); Pablo Ryan 2/46 (8 overs)

Nepal won by 8 wickets.
Centro Sportivo Dozza, Navile
Umpires: Ian Gould (England) & Keith Smith (Ireland)
Player of the match: Anil Mandal (Nepal)

- Argentina won the toss and chose to bat.

19 August
(Scorecard)

United States; 203/8 (50 overs)	v	Nepal; 148 (49.3 overs)
Sushil Nadkarni 64* (85); Sharad Vesawkar 2/25 (9 overs)		Paras Khadka 44 (73); Usman Shuja 3/17 (8 overs)

United States won by 55 runs.
Ovale di Rastignano, Pianoro
Umpires: Louis Fourie (Ireland) & Charlie Alexander McElwee (Ireland)
Player of the match: Sushil Nadkarni (USA)

- United States won the toss and chose to bat.
- Replay of match previously scheduled for 14 August.

19 August
(Scorecard)

Italy; 233/8 (50 overs)	v	Cayman Islands; 186 (45 overs)
Nicholas Northcote 70 (120); Ryan Bovell 3/58 (10 overs)		Pearson Best 85 (103); Gayashan Munasinghe 4/20 (9 overs)

Italy won by 47 runs.
Centro Sportivo Ca'Nova, Medicina
Umpires: Keith Smith (Ireland) & Richard Smith (Germany)
Player of the match: Andy Northcote (Italy)

- Italy won the toss and chose to bat.
- Replay of match previously scheduled for 14 August.

19 August
(Scorecard)

Argentina; 197 (50 overs)	v	Tanzania; 198/7 (41 overs)
Grant Dugmore 44 (51); Kassim Nassoro 6/42 (10 overs)		Seif Khalifa 72 (41); Diego Lord 3/41 (10 overs)

Tanzania won by 3 wickets.
Centro Sportivo Dozza, Navile
Umpires: Ian Gould (England) & Courtney Young (Cayman Islands)
Player of the match: Kassim Nassoro (Tanzania)

- Argentina won the toss and chose to bat.
- Replay of match previously scheduled for 14 August.

20 August
(Scorecard)

United States; 306/6 (50 overs)	v	Argentina; 110 (27.2 overs)
Rashard Marshall 122* (84); Gary Savage 3/61 (10 overs)		Tomas Francis 32 (52); Kevin Darlington 3/21 (6 overs)

United States won by 196 runs.
Ovale di Rastignano, Pianoro
Umpires: Andy Bisson (Guernsey) & Richard Smith (Germany)
Player of the match: Aditya Thyagarajan (USA)

- United States won the toss and chose to bat.

20 August
(Scorecard)

Cayman Islands; 69 (39.5 overs)	v	Nepal; 70/3 (17.2 overs)
Ryan Bovell 31* (86); Basanta Regmi 4/13 (9.5 overs)		Mahesh Chhetri 19 (22); Conroy Wright 2/32 (8 overs)

Nepal won by 7 wickets.
Centro Sportivo Ca'Nova, Medicina
Umpires: Louis Fourie (Ireland) & Ian Gould (England)
Player of the match: Basanta Regmi (Nepal)

- Cayman Islands won the toss and chose to bat.

20 August
(Scorecard)

Italy; 259/7 (50 overs)	v	Tanzania; 92 (27 overs)
Peter Petricola 89 (100); Khalil Rehmtullah 2/30 (10 overs)		Kassim Nassoro 34 (39); Peter Petricola 4/24 (8 overs)

Italy won by 167 runs.
Centro Sportivo Dozza, Navile
Umpires: Charlie Alexander McElwee (Ireland) & Keith Smith (Ireland)
Player of the match: Peter Petricola (Italy)

- Italy won the toss and chose to bat.

=== Playoffs ===
==== 5th place playoff ====
21 August
Scorecard

Argentina; 182/9 (50 overs)	v	Cayman Islands; 186/3 (29.3 overs)
Carlos Gibson 45 (116); Conroy Wright 2/19 (6 overs)		Ramon Sealy 60 (57); Diego Lord 2/40 (10 overs)

Cayman Islands won by 7 wickets.
Ovale di Rastignano, Bologna
Umpires: Andy Bisson (Guernsey) and Louis Fourie (Ireland)
Player of the match: Ramon Sealy (Cayman Islands)

- Argentina won the toss and chose to bat.

==== 3rd place playoff ====
21 August
Scorecard

Tanzania; 73 (39.3 overs)	v	Nepal; 74/0 (12.3 overs)
Issa Kikasi 32 (72); Shakti Gauchan 3/10 (9 overs)		Anil Mandal 47* (40); Khalil Rehmtullah 0/1 (1 over)

Nepal won by 10 wickets.
Centro Sportivo Ca'Nova, Medicina
Umpires: Charlie McElwee (Ireland) and Keith Smith (Ireland)
Player of the match: Shakti Gauchan (Nepal)

- Tanzania won the toss and chose to bat.

==== Final ====
21 August
Scorecard

Italy; 185/9 (50 overs)	v	United States; 188/2 (21.4 overs)
Peter Petricola 42 (56); Adrian Gordon 4/35 (9 overs)		Lennox Cush 101 (57); Roshendra Abeywickrama 1/22 (3.4 overs)

United States won by 8 wickets.
Centro Sportivo Dozza, Pianoro
Umpires: Richard Smith (Germany) and Courtney Young (Cayman Islands)
Player of the match: Lennox Cush (USA)

- Italy won the toss and chose to bat.

== Final placings ==
Pos.	Team	Status
1st	United States	Promoted to Division Three for 2011
2nd	Italy	Promoted to Division Three for 2011
3rd	Nepal	Remained in Division Four for 2012
4th	Tanzania	Remained in Division Four for 2012
5th	Cayman Islands	Relegated to Division Five for 2012
6th	Argentina	Relegated to Division Five for 2012

== Statistics ==
Most Runs		Most Wickets	
(Italy) Peter Petricola	235	(Nepal) Basanta Regmi	14
(Italy) Andrew Northcote	227	(Nepal) Amrit Bhattarai	12
(United States) Sushil Nadkarni	216	(Tanzania) Khalil Rehmtullah	12
(United States) Lennox Cush	192	(Tanzania) Kassim Nassoro	12
(Tanzania) Seif Khalifa	190	(United States) Usman Shuja	11
