= Martin Pedersen =

Martin Pedersen may refer to:

- Martin Pedersen (footballer) (born 1983), Danish footballer
- Martin Pedersen (cyclist) (born 1983), Danish road cyclist
- Martin Pedersen (tennis) (born 1987), Danish tennis player
- Martin Pedersen (cricketer) (born 1988), Danish cricketer
- Martin Pedersen, vocalist for Visceral Bleeding
