= Jacob Larsen =

Jacob Larsen may refer to:

- Jacob Larsen (cricketer) (1979–2023), Danish cricketer
- Jacob Larsen (rower) (born 1988), Danish rower
- Jacob Larsen (basketball) (born 1997), Danish basketball player
- Jacob Bruun Larsen (born 1998), Danish footballer

== See also ==
- Jakob Larsen (disambiguation)
- Jacob Larsson
