= Vince Pennazza =

Italian cricketer

Personal information
- Full name: Vincenzo Pennazza
- Born: 19 October 1984 (age 42); Paarl, Cape Province, South Africa
- Batting: Right-handed
- Bowling: Left-arm medium

International information
- National side: Italy

Career statistics
Competition	Twenty20
Matches	9
Runs scored	17
Batting average	5.66
100s/50s	–/–
Top score	12
Balls bowled	180
Wickets	8
Bowling average	23.50
5 wickets in innings	–
10 wickets in match	–
Best bowling	2/11
Catches/stumpings	2/–
- Source: Cricinfo, 2 June 2012

Vincenzo Pennazza (born 19 October 1984) is a South African-born Italian cricketer. Pennazza is a right-handed batsman who bowls left-arm medium pace. He was born at Paarl, Cape Province.

While still living in South Africa, Pennazza played five Youth One Day Internationals for South Africa Under-19s, with his first appearance coming on tour against England Under-19s at the County Ground, Hove. His further four appearances came in the 2004 Under-19 World Cup, playing against Uganda Under-19s, England Under-19s, India Under-19s, and West Indies Under-19s. He later qualified to play for Italy, owing to his Italian heritage. His first appearance for Italy came against a Leinster Cricket Union President's XI in a warm up match for the 2008 European Cricket Championship Division One, in which Pennazza played four matches. He was then selected as part of Italy's squad for the 2008 World Cricket League Division Four in Tanzania, making six appearances. He took 8 wickets in the tournament at an average of 17.25, with best figures of 2/10. With the bat, he scored 78 runs at a batting average of 14.40, with a high score of 31. His next appearance for Italy came in the 2011 World Cricket League Division Three in Hong Kong, with Pennazza included in Italy's thirteen man squad. He played in five of Italy's six matches in the tournament, taking 8 wickets at an average of 30.12, with best figures of 3/72. With the bat, he scored 47 runs at an average of 15.66, with a high score of 18.

He was later selected as part of Italy's sixteen-man squad for the 2012 World Twenty20 Qualifier in the United Arab Emirates. He made his Twenty20 debut in the tournament against Oman, with Pannazza making eight further appearances, the last of which came against Kenya. In his nine matches, he took 8 wickets at an average of 23.50, with best figures of 2/11. With the bat, he scored 17 runs at an average of 5.66, with a high score of 12. Italy finished the tournament in tenth place and therefore missed out on qualification for the 2012 World Twenty in Sri Lanka. In April 2013, he was selected in Italy's fourteen-man squad for the World Cricket League Division Three in Bermuda.
