= 2011 ICC World Cricket League Division Two =

- Administrator: International Cricket Council
- Cricket format: List A
- Tournament format: Round-robin
- Host: United Arab Emirates
- Champions: United Arab Emirates
- Participants: 6
- Matches: 18
- Player of the series: Craig Williams
- Most runs: Craig Williams (Nam)
- Most wickets: Louis Klazinga (Nam)
- Official website: ICC World Cricket League

The 2011 ICC World Cricket League Division Two was a cricket tournament that took place between 8–15 April 2011, in the United Arab Emirates. It formed part of the ICC World Cricket League and qualifying for the 2015 Cricket World Cup. The matches in the competition had List A status.

== Teams ==
The teams that took part in the tournament were decided according to the results of the 2009 ICC World Cup Qualifier and the 2011 ICC World Cricket League Division Three.

Team	Last outcome
United Arab Emirates	Relegated from 2009 ICC World Cup Qualifier after finishing 7th
Namibia	Relegated from 2009 ICC World Cup Qualifier after finishing 8th
Bermuda	Relegated from 2009 ICC World Cup Qualifier after finishing 9th
Uganda	Relegated from 2009 ICC World Cup Qualifier after finishing 10th
Hong Kong	Promoted from 2011 World Cricket League Division Three after finishing 1st
Papua New Guinea	Promoted from 2011 World Cricket League Division Three after finishing 2nd

== Squads ==
Bermuda	Hong Kong	Namibia	Papua New Guinea	Uganda	United Arab Emirates
David Hemp (C); Jason Anderson(Wk); Damali Bell; Delyone Borden; Lionel Cann; Fiqre Crockwell (Wk); Chris Foggo; Kyle Hodsoll; Malachi Jones; Stefan Kelly; Irving Romaine; Dion Stovell; Rodney Trott; Jim West	Najeeb Amar (C); Nadeem Ahmed; Irfan Ahmed; Waqas Barkat (Wk); Munir Dar; Hussain Butt; Asif Khan; Courtney Kruger; Roy Lamsam; Mark Chapman; Nizakat Khan; Max Tucker; Adil Mehmood; Aizaz Khan	Craig Williams (C); Jan-Berrie Burger; Kola Burger; Sarel Burger; Louis Klazinga; Bjorn Kotze; Bernard Scholtz; Gerrie Snyman; Ewald Steenkamp (Wk); Louis van der Westhuizen; Raymond van Schoor; Tobias Verwey (Wk); Christi Viljoen; Pikky Ya France	Rarua Dikana (C) (Wk); Andrew McIntosh; Chris Amini; Hitolo Areni; Mahuru Dai; Willie Gavera; Raymond Haoda; Christopher Kent; Jason Kila; Kila Pala; Tony Ura; Assad Vala; Jack Vare (Wk); Vani Morea	Akbar Baig (C); Raymond Otim; Hamza Almuzahim; Davis Arinaitwe; Arthur Kyobe; Deusdedit Muhumuza; Roger Mukasa (Wk); Benjamin Musoke; Frank Nsubuga; Danniel Ruyange; Ronald Ssemanda; Charles Waiswa; Lawrence Sematimba(Wk); Henry Senyondo	Khurram Khan (C); Ahmed Raza; Amjad Ali (Wk); Aqib Malik; Amjad Javed; Arshad Ali; Irfan Sajjad; Mohammad Tauqir; Naeemuddin Aslam; Nasir Aziz; Swapnil Patil (Wk); Saqib Ali; Shaiman Anwar; Shadeep Silva

== Fixtures ==
=== Group stage ===
==== Points table ====
Pos	Team	Pld	W	L	T	NR	Pts	NRR	
1	United Arab Emirates	5	5	0	0	0	10	1.476	Met in the final and qualified for the 2011–13 ICC World Cricket League Championship Qualified for 2011-13 ICC Intercontinental Cup
2	Namibia	5	4	1	0	0	8	1.838	Met in the final and qualified for the 2011–13 ICC World Cricket League Championship Qualified for 2011-13 ICC Intercontinental Cup
3	Papua New Guinea	5	3	2	0	0	6	−0.716	Met in the 3rd place playoff and qualified for the 2014 ICC World Cup Qualifier
4	Hong Kong	5	1	4	0	0	2	−0.462	Met in the 3rd place playoff and qualified for the 2014 ICC World Cup Qualifier
5	Bermuda	5	1	4	0	0	2	−0.708	Met in the 5th place playoff and relegated to Division Three for 2013
6	Uganda	5	1	4	0	0	2	−1.196	Met in the 5th place playoff and relegated to Division Three for 2013

==== Matches ====
8 April
Scorecard

Namibia; 176 (48 overs)	v	United Arab Emirates; 177/9 (43.5 overs)
Gerrie Snyman 57 (87); Shadeep Silva 3/20 (10 overs)		Khurram Khan 54* (103); Louis Klazinga 3/45 (9 overs)

United Arab Emirates won by 1 wicket
DSC Cricket Stadium, Dubai
Umpires: Gary Baxter (NZ) and Sarika Prasad (Sin)
Player of the match: Khurram Khan (UAE)

- Namibia won the toss and elected to bat

8 April
Scorecard

Papua New Guinea; 231/9 (50 overs)	v	Bermuda; 188 (48.2 overs)
Tony Ura 52 (51); Delyone Borden 3/43 (10 overs)		Dion Stovell 42 (64); Chris Amini 2/26 (10 overs)

Papua New Guinea won by 43 runs
ICC Global Cricket Academy Oval 1, Dubai
Umpires: Buddhi Pradhan (Nep) and Riaz Chaudhry (Kuw)
Player of the match: Mahuru Dai (PNG)

- Bermuda won the toss and elected to field

8 April
Scorecard

Hong Kong; 204 (50 overs)	v	Uganda; 178 (48 overs)
Mark Chapman 70 (93); Ronald Ssemanda 2/35 (6 overs)		Roger Mukasa 52 (72); Nizakat Khan 4/14 (10 overs)

Hong Kong won by 26 runs
ICC Global Cricket Academy Oval 2, Dubai
Umpires: Sri Ganesh (Sin) and Theunis van Schalkwyk (Nam)
Player of the match: Mark Chapman (HK)

- Hong Kong won the toss and elected to bat

9 April
Scorecard

Namibia; 272/5 (50 overs)	v	Uganda; 67 (26.3 overs)
Craig Williams 100 (98); Deusdedit Muhumza 3/51 (8 overs)		Benjamin Musoke 28 (65); Kola Burger 5/25 (10 overs)

Namibia won by 205 runs
DSC Cricket Stadium, Dubai
Umpires: Sri Ganesh (Sin) and Richard Smith (Ger)
Player of the match: Craig Williams (Nam)

- Uganda won the toss and elected to field.

9 April
Scorecard

Bermuda; 242/7 (50 overs)	v	Hong Kong; 173 (41.3 overs)
Jason Anderson 106* (137); Asif Khan 2/46 (6 overs)		Najeeb Amar 49 (56); Rodney Trott 3/22 (7.3 overs)

Bermuda won by 69 runs
ICC Global Cricket Academy Oval 1, Dubai
Umpires: Gary Baxter (NZ) and Buddhi Pradhan (Nep)
Player of the match: Jason Anderson (Ber)

- Bermuda won the toss and elected to bat.

9 April
Scorecard

United Arab Emirates; 284 (49.2 overs)	v	Papua New Guinea; 170/9 (50 overs)
Shaiman Anwar 123 (118); Mahuru Dai 4/56 (10 overs)		Chris Amini 42 (74); Arshad Ali 3/37 (8 overs)

United Arab Emirates won by 114 runs
ICC Global Cricket Academy Oval 2, Dubai
Umpires: Sarika Prasad (Sin) and Riaz Chaudhry (Kuw)
Player of the match: Shaiman Anwar (UAE)

- United Arab Emirates won the toss and elected to bat.

11 April
Scorecard

Uganda; 249/7 (50 overs)	v	Bermuda; 175 (47 overs)
Lawrence Sematimba 66* (85); Rodney Trott 2/46 (10 overs)		Lionel Cann 44 (66); Roger Mukasa 4/21 (7 overs)

Uganda won by 74 runs
DSC Cricket Stadium, Dubai
Umpires: Riaz Chaudhry (Kuw) and Theunis van Schalkwyk (Nam)
Player of the match: Lawrence Sematimba (Uga)

- Uganda won the toss and elected to bat

11 April
Scorecard

United Arab Emirates; 227/9 (50 overs)	v	Hong Kong; 208 (47.4 overs)
Amjad Ali 69 (78); Najeeb Amar 4/33 (10 overs)		Mark Chapman 81 (89); Shadeep Silva 4/17 (10 overs)

United Arab Emirates won by 19 runs
ICC Global Cricket Academy Oval 1, Dubai
Umpires: Sri Ganesh (Sin) and Sarika Prasad (Sin)
Player of the match: Shadeep Silva (UAE)

- United Arab Emirates won the toss and elected to bat.

11 April
Scorecard

Papua New Guinea; 92 (23.2 overs)	v	Namibia; 95/2 (15.2 overs)
Jason Kila 23 (26); Louis van der Westhuizen 3/4 (5 overs)		Craig Williams 73* (35); Raymond Haoda 2/33 (5 overs)

Namibia won by 8 wickets
ICC Global Cricket Academy Oval 2, Dubai
Umpires: Gary Baxter (NZ) and Richard Smith (Ger)
Player of the match: Craig Williams (Nam)

- Papua New Guinea won the toss and elected to bat

12 April
Scorecard

Papua New Guinea; 217/8 (50 overs)	v	Hong Kong; 174 (46.1 overs)
Christopher Kent 59 (113); Najeeb Amar 4/55 (9 overs)		Nizakat Khan 55 (83); Hitolo Areni 4/34 (8.1 overs)

Papua New Guinea won by 43 runs
DSC Cricket Stadium, Dubai
Umpires: Sarika Prasad (Sin) and Theunis van Schalkwyk (Nam)
Player of the match: Rarua Dikana (PNG)

- Papua New Guinea won the toss and elected to bat

12 April
Scorecard

Uganda; 86 (34.1 overs)	v	United Arab Emirates; 88/2 (17.2 overs)
Davis Arinaitwe 20 (44); Ahmed Raza 4/17 (7.1 overs)		Amjad Ali 40* (52); Henry Senyondo 1/15 (2.2 overs)

United Arab Emirates won by 8 wickets
ICC Global Cricket Academy Oval 1, Dubai
Umpires: Gary Baxter (NZ) and Sri Ganesh (Sin)
Player of the match: Ahmed Raza (UAE)

- Uganda won the toss and elected to bat

12 April
Scorecard

Namibia; 297/8 (50 overs)	v	Bermuda; 211 (42.3 overs)
Ewald Steenkamp 87 (119); Rodney Trott 2/37 (9 overs)		Dion Stovell 73 (67); Louis van der Westhuizen 4/14 (6.3 overs)

Namibia won by 86 runs
ICC Global Cricket Academy Oval 2, Dubai
Umpires: Buddhi Pradhan (Nep) and Richard Smith (Ger)
Player of the match: Louis van der Westhuizen (Nam)

- Namibia won the toss and elected to bat

14 April
Scorecard

United Arab Emirates; 257/9 (50 overs)	v	Bermuda; 214 (48 overs)
Amjad Ali 57 (81); Irving Romaine 4/37 (6 overs)		Dion Stovell 77 (94); Nasir Aziz 4/44 (9 overs)

United Arab Emirates won by 43 runs
DSC Cricket Stadium, Dubai
Umpires: Gary Baxter (NZ) and Theunis van Schalkwyk (Nam)
Player of the match: Amjad Ali (UAE)

- United Arab Emirates won the toss and elected to bat.

14 April
Scorecard

Hong Kong; 237 (49.2 overs)	v	Namibia; 243/7 (49 overs)
Nizakat Khan 95 (94); Louis Klazinga 5/50 (10 overs)		Gerrie Snyman 59 (83); Irfan Ahmed 3/52 (8 overs)

Namibia won by 3 wickets
ICC Global Cricket Academy Oval 1, Dubai
Umpires: Buddhi Pradhan (Nep) and Riaz Chaudhry (Kuw)
Player of the match: Louis Klazinga (Nam)

- Hong Kong won the toss and elected to bat

14 April
Scorecard

Papua New Guinea; 186 (49.3 overs)	v	Uganda; 185/9 (50 overs)
Assad Vala 43 (73); Charles Waiswa 3/46 (10 overs)		Roger Mukasa 63 (78); Willie Gavera 3/31 (10 overs)

Papua New Guinea won by 1 run
ICC Global Cricket Academy Oval 2, Dubai
Umpires: Sarika Prasad (Sin) and Richard Smith (Ger)
Player of the match: Rarua Dikana (PNG)

- Papua New Guinea won the toss and elected to bat

=== Playoffs ===
==== 5th place playoff ====
15 April
Scorecard

Bermuda; 193 (48 overs)	v	Uganda; 194/4 (46.2 overs)
David Hemp 44 (67); Danniel Ruyange 2/35 (8 overs)		Arthur Kyobe 65 (114); Kyle Hodsoll 2/49 (8 overs)

Uganda won by 6 wickets
ICC Global Cricket Academy Oval 2, Dubai
Umpires: Riaz Chaudhry (Kuw) and Richard Smith (Ger)
Player of the match: Arthur Kyobe (Uga)

- Bermuda won the toss and elected to bat

==== 3rd place playoff ====
15 April
Scorecard

Papua New Guinea; 225/6 (50 overs)	v	Hong Kong; 98 (25.3 overs)
Vani Morea 74* (87); Nizakat Khan 2/37 (10 overs)		Waqas Barkat 25 (16); Andrew McIntosh 3/14 (5 overs)

Papua New Guinea won by 127 runs
ICC Global Cricket Academy Oval 1, Dubai
Umpires: Sri Ganesh (Sin) and Theunis van Schalkwyk (Nam)
Player of the match: Vani Morea (PNG)

- Papua New Guinea won the toss and elected to bat

==== Final ====
15 April
Scorecard

Namibia; 200 (49.3 overs)	v	United Arab Emirates; 201/5(45.3 overs)
Craig Williams 58 (64); Saqib Ali 3/13(4 overs)		Saqib Ali 73 (116); Kola Burger 2/38 (10 overs)

United Arab Emirates won by 5 wickets
DSC Cricket Stadium, Dubai
Umpires: Buddhi Pradhan (Nep) and Sarika Prasad (Sin)
Player of the match: Saqib Ali (UAE)

- Namibia won the toss and elected to bat

== Final Placings ==
Pos	Team	Promotion/Relegation
1st	United Arab Emirates	Promoted to 2011–13 ICC World Cricket League Championship & 2011–13 ICC Intercontinental Cup
2nd	Namibia	Promoted to 2011–13 ICC World Cricket League Championship & 2011–13 ICC Intercontinental Cup
3rd	Papua New Guinea	Promoted to 2014 ICC World Cup Qualifier
4th	Hong Kong	Promoted to 2014 ICC World Cup Qualifier
5th	Uganda	Relegated to 2013 Division Three
6th	Bermuda	Relegated to 2013 Division Three

== Statistics ==
=== Most runs ===
The top five highest run scorers (total runs) in the season are included in this table.

Player	Team	Runs	Inns	Avg	S/R	HS	100s	50s	4s	6s
Craig Williams	Namibia	335	6	67.00	117.54	100	1	3	31	12
Dion Stovell	Bermuda	243	6	40.50	84.96	77	0	2	31	4
Gerrie Snyman	Namibia	219	5	43.80	71.80	85	0	3	9	12
Amjad Ali	United Arab Emirates	215	6	43.00	77.89	69	0	2	30	0
Lionel Cann	Bermuda	212	6	35.33	100.00	53	0	2	20	6

=== Most wickets ===
The following table contains the five leading wicket-takers of the season.

Player	Team	Wkts	Mts	Ave	S/R	Econ	BBI
Louis Klazinga	Namibia	14	6	14.85	18.8	4.72	5/50
Kola Burger	Namibia	14	6	15.71	24.4	4.72	5/25
Arshad Ali	United Arab Emirates	13	6	15.53	24.4	3.81	3/37
Najeeb Amar	Hong Kong	13	6	17.92	25.3	4.23	4/33
Shadeep Silva	United Arab Emirates	11	6	12.54	30.5	2.46	4/17
