= Carl Sandri =

Italian cricketer

Personal information
- Full name: Carl Stephen Sandri
- Born: 11 July 1983 (age 43); Melbourne, Australia
- Batting: Right-handed
- Bowling: Right-arm off break
- Role: All-rounder

International information
- National side: Italy (2012–2017)

Domestic team information
- Years: Team
- 2013: Sydney Thunder (squad no. 12)

Head coaching information
- Years: Team
- 2021–2022: Papua New Guinea

Career statistics
Competition	Twenty20
Matches	18
Runs scored	332
Batting average	30.18
100s/50s	–/–
Top score	49*
Balls bowled	408
Wickets	23
Bowling average	19.26
5 wickets in innings	–
10 wickets in match	–
Best bowling	4/9
Catches/stumpings	6/–
- Source: Cricinfo, 25 December 2013

Carl Stephen Sandri (born 11 July 1983) is an Italian-Australian cricket coach and former player. He represented Italy from 2012 to 2017 and also played a single season with the Sydney Thunder. He is an all-rounder who bats right-handed and bowls off-spin. He coached Papua New Guinea from 2021 to 2022.

== Playing career ==
Sandri played for the Victoria Second XI in the 2005/06 Australian season. Sandri later moved to England, where he played a single match in county cricket for the Worcestershire Second XI against the Yorkshire Second XI in 2008, but unable to force his way into the Worcestershire first eleven. While in England, he also played in the Central Lancashire League in 2008 for Radcliffe, and in the Lancashire League for Lowerhouse in 2009.

By 2012, he had qualified to play for Italy by way of his Italian heritage. He was selected as part of Italy's fourteen-man squad for the 2012 World Twenty20 Qualifier in the United Arab Emirates in March 2012. He made his Twenty20 debut during the tournament against Oman. He made eight further appearances during the tournament, the last of which came against Kenya.

In his nine matches, he took 13 wickets with the ball at a bowling average of 19.23, with best figures of 4/9. He ended the tournament as Italy's joint leading wicket-taker alongside Damian Crowley. With the bat, he scored 122 runs at an average of 20.33, with a high score of 49 not out. Italy finished the tournament in tenth place and therefore missed out on qualification for the 2012 World Twenty in Sri Lanka.

In April 2013, he was selected in Italy's fourteen-man squad for the World Cricket League Division Three in Bermuda. In the same year he also played for Sydney Thunder

In September 2017, he took the most wickets for Italy in the 2017 ICC World Cricket League Division Five tournament, with a total of thirteen dismissals in five matches.

== Coaching career ==
In March 2021, Sandri was appointed as coach of the Papua New Guinea national cricket team, replacing fellow Australian Joe Dawes. He resigned in August 2022, having coached the team to its maiden World Cup appearance at the 2021 ICC T20 World Cup in the Middle East. In 2023 Carl was appointed the Head of Cricket at St. Kevin's College, the school he attended. Carl oversees coaching and high-performance cricket at the College. St. Kevin's College competes in the Associated Public Schools (APS), a sports competition in Melbourne. In the 2024/25 season, Carl also took the reins of the 1st XI at SKC and delivered the first APS Cricket Premiership in 10 years at the College.
