= Reshard =

Reshard or ReShard is a given name. Notable people with the given name include:

- Reshard Cliett (born 1992), American football player
- Reshard Langford (born 1986), American football player
- ReShard Lee (born 1980), American football player

== See also ==
- Rashard
