= Dilan Fernando =

Sri Lankan-born Italian cricketer

Personal information
- Full name: Dilan Shameera Fernando Arsakulasuriya
- Born: 23 April 1985 (age 41); Negombo, Western Province, Sri Lanka
- Batting: Left-handed
- Bowling: Right-arm medium

International information
- National side: Italy

Career statistics
Competition	Twenty20
Matches	3
Runs scored	–
Batting average	–
100s/50s	–/–
Top score	–
Balls bowled	42
Wickets	2
Bowling average	20.50
5 wickets in innings	–
10 wickets in match	–
Best bowling	1/6
Catches/stumpings	–/–
- Source: Cricinfo, 2 June 2012

Dilan Shameera Fernando Arsakulasuriya (born 23 April 1985) is a Sri Lankan-born Italian cricketer. Fernando is a left-handed batsman who bowls right-arm medium pace. He was born at Negombo, Western Province. Due to the length of his name, he is more commonly known as Dilan Fernando.

Fernando made his debut for Italy against Ireland A in the 2010 European Cricket Championship Division One, making five appearances during the tournament. Later in 2010, he was selected as part of Italy's fourteen man squad for World Cricket League Division Four, which was hosted by Italy. He made five appearances for Italy during the tournament, helping Italy gain promotion to Division Three in 2011. Fernando was a part of Italy's thirteen man squad for Division Three, which was held in Hong Kong in January 2011. He made six appearances during the tournament, taking 7 wickets at an average of 32.00, with best figures of 3/40.

In July 2011, Fernando played in the European T20 Championship in Jersey and Guernsey, which saw Italy end the tournament as runners-up to Denmark. This result qualified them to take part in the World Twenty20 Qualifier in the United Arab Emirates in March 2012. Fernando was selected as part of Italy's fourteen man squad for the qualifier. He made his Twenty20 debut during the tournament against Oman. He made two further appearances, against Uganda and Namibia. In his three matches, he was called upon to bat, while with the ball he took 2 wickets at an average of 20.50, with best figures of 1/6. Italy finished the tournament in tenth place and therefore missed out on qualification for the 2012 World Twenty in Sri Lanka.

In April 2013, he was selected in Italy's fourteen man squad for the World Cricket League Division Three in Bermuda.
