= Michael Ndiko =

Ugandan cricketer

Personal information
- Born: 28 November 1977 (age 48); Uganda
- Batting: Right-handed
- Bowling: Right-arm off-spin
- Role: Opening batsman

International information
- National side: Uganda (2004–2013)
- Source: CricketArchive, 23 March 2016

Michael Ndiko (born 28 November 1977) is a former Ugandan international cricketer who represented the Ugandan national team between 2004 and 2013. He played as a right-handed opening batsman.

Ndiko made his debut for Uganda in a 2004 ICC Intercontinental Cup game against Namibia, which held first-class status. Opening the batting with Benjamin Musoke, he had the distinction of facing Uganda's first ball in first-class cricket, and was also the first to be dismissed (run out by Louis Burger for 23). Ndiko was retained for Uganda's second and final Intercontinental Cup match of 2004, against Kenya, and made a third first-class appearance in the tournament's 2005 edition (also against Kenya). After that, he did not reappear for the national team for over eight years, eventually returning to the Ugandan squad for the 2013 World Cricket League Division Three tournament in Bermuda. He played in only one match, however, scoring seven runs opening the batting with Arthur Kyobe against Oman.
