= Alessandro Bonora =

Italian cricketer

Personal information
- Full name: Alessandro Bonora
- Born: 24 May 1978 (age 48); Bordighera, Liguria, Italy
- Batting: Right-handed
- Bowling: Right-arm fast-medium

International information
- National side: Italy

Career statistics
Competition	Twenty20
Matches	15
Runs scored	146
Batting average	20.85
100s/50s	–/–
Top score	40*
Catches/stumpings	6/–
- Source: Cricinfo, 6 October 2020

Alessandro Bonora (born 24 May 1978) is an Italian former cricketer.

== Life and cricket career ==
Bonora was born at Bordighera in Italy's Liguria region, but grew up in South Africa, where he was educated in Cape Town. While playing club cricket in Cape Town under the captaincy of the Dutch cricketer Roland Lefebvre, Bonora was put in contact with the Italian Cricket Federation, who arranged for him to play for Lazio Cricket Club.

A right-handed batsman and a fast-medium bowler, Bonora made his debut for Italy against Scotland in the 2000 European Cricket Championship, making five appearances during the tournament. He next played for Italy two years later in the 2002 European Cricket Championship, making five appearances. By 2004, the European Cricket Championship had been divided into two divisions, with Italy placed in Division Two. He played in that year's European Cricket Championship Division Two, making four appearances, and helping in Italy's promotion to Division One. In February 2005, Bonora played in a qualifying tournament in Malaysia for the 2005 ICC Trophy, playing in five matches during the tournament. Italy failed to qualify for the tournament, therefore missing out on an opportunity to qualify for the 2007 World Cup. He played in the 2006 European Cricket Championship Division One, making four appearances. Bonora captained Italy in this tournament in the place of Joe Scuderi, with Italy finishing in fifth and last place.

Bonora was selected to captain Italy in the 2007 World Cricket League Division Three which was held in Northern Territory, Australia. He played six matches during the tournament, scoring 124 runs at an average of 24.80, with a high score of 36. He played for Italy in the 2008 European Cricket Championship Division One, but relinquished the captaincy back to Scuderi. He made five appearances during the tournament. Having been relegated in the previous World Cricket League Italy had taken part in, Bonora was later selected for the 2010 World Cricket League Division Four, which was hosted by Italy. He played in five matches during the tournament, which saw Bonora captain Italy to promotion to 2011 World Cricket League Division Three. Division Three was played in Hong Kong in January 2011, with Bonora once again captaining the side. He played in all six of Italy's matches in the tournament, scoring 286 runs at an average of 57.20, with a high score of 124 not out. This score came against Oman. He ended the tournament as the leading run scorer.

In March 2012, Italy took part in the World Twenty20 Qualifier in the United Arab Emirates, having qualified for the event by being runners-up in the European T20 Championship in Jersey and Guernsey earlier in July 2011. Bonora was selected as captain in Italy's fourteen-man squad for the qualifier. He made his Twenty20 debut against Oman in their first match, which Italy won. He made eight further appearances during the tournament, the last of which came against Kenya. In his nine appearances in the tournament, he scored 98 runs at an average of 19.60, with a high score of 40 not out. Italy finished the tournament in tenth place and therefore missed out on qualification for the 2012 World Twenty in Sri Lanka.

In April 2013, Bonora was selected in Italy's fourteen-man squad as captain for the World Cricket League Division Three in Bermuda. His final appearances for Italy came in the 2014 and 2016 editions of the World Cricket League Division Four.
