= Munis Ansari =

Indian-born cricketer

Personal information
- Full name: Munis Ansari
- Born: 1 April 1986 (age 40); Sehore, Madhya Pradesh, India
- Batting: Right-handed
- Bowling: Right-arm fast-medium
- Role: Bowler

International information
- National side: Oman (2013-2016)
- T20I debut (cap 3): 25 July 2015 v Afghanistan
- Last T20I: 9 March 2016 v Ireland

Career statistics
Competition	T20I	T20
Matches	11	15
Runs scored	5	2
Batting average	–	–
100s/50s	0/0	0/0
Top score	3*	2*
Balls bowled	227	335
Wickets	8	18
Bowling average	41.75	24.38
5 wickets in innings	0	0
10 wickets in match	0	0
Best bowling	3/37	4/15
Catches/stumpings	0/–	0/–
- Source: CricketArchive, 10 March 2016

Munis Ansari (born 1 April 1986) is an Indian-born cricketer who plays for the Oman national cricket team. He debuted for the Omani national side at the 2013 World Cricket League Division Three tournament. A right-arm pace bowler, his slinging bowling action has been likened to that of Lasith Malinga, although he does not produce the same speed.

== Career ==
Ansari began his cricket career in his native India where he was born in Sehore, Madhya Pradesh, a city near the state capital of Bhopal. After failing to gain selection for the state team, he began to play in corporate tournaments in the Middle East, eventually relocating to Oman permanently. Ansari made his international debut for Oman at the 2013 WCL Division Three tournament in Bermuda, and took 16 wickets in six matches, the most by any player. His best figures, 4/72, came against Italy in the fifth-place playoff. Ansari has since played for Oman in various ICC and Asian Cricket Council (ACC) tournaments, including at the 2015 World Twenty20 Qualifier. He made his Twenty20 International debut in the tournament's fifth-place playoff, against Afghanistan, having earlier taken figures of 4/15 against the Netherlands to help his team to an upset victory.

He made his List A debut for Oman in their three-match series against the United Arab Emirates in October 2016.
