= Asif Khan (Hong Kong cricketer) =

Hong Kong cricketer

Personal information
- Full name: Asif Khan
- Born: 28 November 1989 (age 36); Hong Kong
- Batting: Right-handed
- Bowling: Right-arm medium

International information
- National side: Hong Kong

Career statistics
Competition	List A
Matches	3
Runs scored	2
Batting average	2.00
100s/50s	–/–
Top score	2*
Balls bowled	102
Wickets	3
Bowling average	30.33
5 wickets in innings	–
10 wickets in match	–
Best bowling	2/46
Catches/stumpings	1/–
- Source: Cricinfo, 21 May 2011

Asif Khan (born 28 November 1989) is a Hong Kong cricketer. Khan is a right-handed batsman who bowls right-arm medium pace.

Having played age group cricket for Hong Kong Under-19s in the 2010 Under-19 World Cup, he proceeded to make his World Cricket League debut for Hong Kong in the 2011 World Cricket League Division Three, where he helped Hong Kong earn promotion to 2011 World Cricket League Division Two. It was in this tournament that he made his List A debut against Uganda. He played 2 further List A matches in the competition, against Bermuda and Papua New Guinea. In his 3 matches, he took 3 wickets at a bowling average of 30.33, with best figures of 2/46.
