= Rashard =

Given name

Rashard is a given name. Notable people with the name include:

- Rashard Anderson (born 1977), former American football cornerback in the NFL
- Rashard Cook (born 1977), former professional American football safety in the NFL
- Rashard Griffith (born 1974), American professional basketball player
- Rashard Lawrence (born 1998), American football player
- Rashard Lewis (born 1979), American professional basketball player
- Rashard Marshall (born 1982), American cricketer
- Rashard Mendenhall (born 1987), American football running back
- Rashard Odomes (born 1996), American basketball player in the Israeli Basketball Premier League

== See also ==
- Rayshard, given name
