= Rajesh Ranpura =

Omani cricketer

Personal information
- Full name: Rajeshkumar Jagdishchandra Ranpura
- Born: 17 July 1983 (age 43); Palanpur, Gujarat, India
- Batting: Left-handed
- Bowling: Right-arm fast-medium
- Role: Bowler

International information
- National side: Oman (2011–2015)
- T20I debut (cap 8): 25 July 2015 v Afghanistan
- Last T20I: 22 November 2015 v UAE

Career statistics
| Competition | T20I | T20 |
|---|---|---|
| Matches | 2 | 16 |
| Runs scored | 5 | 79 |
| Batting average | – | 11.28 |
| 100s/50s | 0/0 | 0/0 |
| Top score | 5* | 21 |
| Balls bowled | 36 | 298 |
| Wickets | 3 | 16 |
| Bowling average | 10.66 | 20.37 |
| 5 wickets in innings | 0 | 0 |
| 10 wickets in match | 0 | 0 |
| Best bowling | 2/17 | 3/30 |
| Catches/stumpings | 0/– | 5/– |
- Source: CricketArchive, 10 March 2016

Rajeshkumar Jagdishchandra Ranpura (born 17 July 1983) is an Indian-born cricketer who plays for the Oman national cricket team. Ranpura made his debut for the Omani national side in January 2011, and has played regularly for the side since then. He played in all eight of Oman's matches at the 2012 World Twenty20 Qualifier in the United Arab Emirates, which were accorded Twenty20 status.

Born in Palanpur, Gujarat, Ranpura's debut for Oman came in January 2011, at the 2011 World Cricket League Division Three tournament. At the 2011 ACC Twenty20 Cup later in the year, he played in all six of Oman's matches, scoring 71 runs and taking two wickets. Ranpura was retained in Oman's side for the 2012 World Twenty20 Qualifier. At the tournament, Oman lost all seven of their group matches to finish bottom of Group B, but defeated Denmark in the 15th-place playoff. Ranpura was one of five players to feature in all of Oman's matches, along with Aamer Ali, Aamer Kaleem, Sultan Ahmed, and Zeeshan Siddiqui. He took five wickets in the tournament at an average of 29.40, behind only Zeeshan (12 wickets) and Hemal Mehta (8) for Oman. His best figures, 2/24 from four overs, came against Ireland.

Since the 2012 World Twenty20 Qualifier, Ranpura has featured regularly for Oman in ACC and ICC limited-overs tournaments, including the 2012 ACC Trophy Elite, 2013 and 2015 ACC Twenty20 Cups, the 2014 ACC Premier League and the 2013 WCL Division Three and 2014 WCL Division Four tournaments. He made his Twenty20 International debut against Afghanistan in the 2015 ICC World Twenty20 Qualifier tournament on 25 July 2015.

He made his List A debut for Oman in their three-match series against the United Arab Emirates in October 2016.
