= Hayden Patrizi =

Italian cricketer

Personal information
- Full name: Hayden Peter Patrizi Dell’Agnello
- Born: 1 October 1985 (age 41); Kalgoorlie, Western Australia
- Batting: Right-handed
- Role: Wicket-keeper

International information
- National side: Italy

Career statistics
Competition	Twenty20
Matches	9
Runs scored	34
Batting average	6.80
100s/50s	0/0
Top score	10*
Catches/stumpings	10/2
- Source: Cricinfo, 4 June 2012

Hayden Peter Patrizi Dell’Agnello (born 1 October 1985) is an Australian-born Italian cricketer. Patrizi is a right-handed batsman and wicket-keeper. He was born at Kalgoorlie-Boulder, Western Australia.

While in Australia, Patrizi played for Western Australia at the under-17 and under-19 levels between the 2002/03 and 2004/05 seasons. He also played for the Western Australia Second XI in the 2004/05 and 2005/06 seasons, though he was unable to force his way into the first eleven. In 2009, he played a single Second XI match in England for the Hampshire Second XI against the Somerset Second XI. Patrizi qualified to play for Italy due to his Italian heritage. His first appearance for Italy came against Ireland A in the 2010 European Cricket Championship Division One, in which Patrizi played five matches. He was then selected as part of Italy's squad for the 2010 World Cricket League Division Four, which was hosted by Italy. He made five appearances during the tournament, helping Italy earn promotion to the 2011 World Cricket League Division Three. Division Three was played in Hong Kong in January 2011, with Patrizi selected as part of Italy's thirteen-man squad. He played in all six of Italy's matches in the tournament, scoring 158 runs at an average of 31.60, with a high score of 78. This was one of two half centuries he made in the tournament. Behind the stumps, he took nine catches and made a single stumping.

In July 2011, Patrizi played in the European T20 Championship in Jersey and Guernsey, which saw Italy end the tournament as runners-up to Denmark. This result qualified them to take part in the World Twenty20 Qualifier in the United Arab Emirates in March 2012. He was selected as part of Italy's fourteen-man squad for the qualifier. He made his Twenty20 debut during the tournament against Oman, with him making eight further appearances during the tournament, the last of which came against Kenya. In the nine matches, he scored 34 runs at an average of 6.80, with a high score of 10 not out. Behind the stumps, he took ten catches and made two stumpings. Italy finished the tournament in tenth place and therefore missed out on qualification for the 2012 World Twenty in Sri Lanka. In April 2013, Patrizi was selected in Italy's fourteen-man squad for the World Cricket League Division Three in Bermuda.
