= Jakob Larsen =

Jakob Larsen may refer to:

- Jakob Larsen (historian) (1888–1974), American classical scholar
- Jakob Larsen (handballer) (born 1974), Greenlandic handballer and manager

== See also ==
- Jacob Larsen (disambiguation)
