= Kila Pala =

Papua New Guinean cricketer (born 1986)

Personal information
- Full name: Kila Pala
- Born: 16 May 1986 (age 40); Papua New Guinea
- Batting: Left-handed
- Bowling: Left-arm medium
- Role: Occasional wicket-keeper

International information
- National side: Papua New Guinea

Career statistics
Competition	List A
Matches	3
Runs scored	50
Batting average	16.66
100s/50s	–/–
Top score	22
Balls bowled	–
Wickets	–
Bowling average	–
5 wickets in innings	–
10 wickets in match	–
Best bowling	–
Catches/stumpings	2/–
- Source: Cricinfo, 22 May 2011

Kila Pala (born 16 May 1986) is a Papua New Guinean cricket coach and former player.

Pala played as a left-handed batsman who bowled left-arm medium pace and occasionally fielded as a wicket-keeper. He made his Twenty20 International debut against Ireland in the 2015 ICC World Twenty20 Qualifier tournament on 15 July 2015.

Having played age group cricket for Papua New Guinea Under-19s in the 2004 Under-19 World Cup, he proceeded to be selected as a part of the Papua New Guinea squad for the 2011 World Cricket League Division Three, where he played 5 matches, helping them earn promotion to 2011 World Cricket League Division Two. It was in this competition that he made his List A debut against Namibia. He played a further 2 List A matches in the competition, against Hong Kong and Uganda. In his 3 matches, he scored 50 runs at a batting average of 16.66, with a high score 22.

== Coaching career ==
Pala was head coach of Papua New Guinea at the 2018 Under-19 Cricket World Cup in New Zealand.
