= Peter Petricola =

Italian cricketer

Personal information
- Full name: Peter Antony Petricola
- Born: 5 May 1983 (age 43); Melbourne, Victoria, Australia
- Batting: Left-handed
- Bowling: Right-arm medium-fast

International information
- National side: Italy

Career statistics
Competition	Twenty20
Matches	9
Runs scored	191
Batting average	23.87
100s/50s	–/–
Top score	39*
Balls bowled	78
Wickets	1
Bowling average	106.00
5 wickets in innings	–
10 wickets in match	–
Best bowling	1/17
Catches/stumpings	–/–
- Source: Cricinfo, 3 June 2012

Peter Antony Petricola (born 5 May 1983) is an Australian-born Italian cricketer. Petricola is a left-handed batsman who bowls right-arm medium-fast. He was born at Melbourne, Victoria.

While in Australia, Preticola played four matches for the Victoria Under-19s in December 2001. After a short spell in England in 2005, where he played club cricket for Loughborough Town in the Leicestershire Premier League, He later qualified to play for Italy, owing to his Italian heritage. His first appearance for Italy came against a Leinster Cricket Union President's XI in a warm up match for the 2008 European Cricket Championship Division One, in which Petricola played five matches. He was then selected as part of Italy's squad for the 2008 World Cricket League Division Four in Tanzania, making six appearances. He scored 81 runs during the tournament, at an average of 16.20, with a high score of 36. With the ball, he took 8 wickets at a bowling average of 17.75, with best figures of 3/21. His next appearance for Italy came the 2010 World Cricket League Division Four, which was hosted by Italy. He made six appearances during the tournament, helping Italy earn promotion to the 2011 World Cricket League Division Three. Division Three was played in Hong Kong in January 2011, with Petricola selected as part of Italy's thirteen man squad. He played in all six of Italy's matches in the tournament, scoring 226 runs at an average of 113.00, with a high score of 104 not out. This was his only century in the tournament and came against Hong Kong. He also made two half centuries and also took 11 wickets at an average of 15.36, with best figures of 4/38. He was declared Man of the Tournament at its conclusion.

In July 2011, Petricola played in the European T20 Championship in Jersey and Guernsey, which saw Italy end the tournament as runners-up to Denmark. This result qualified them to take part in the World Twenty20 Qualifier in the United Arab Emirates in March 2012. He was selected as part of Italy's fourteen man squad for the qualifier. He made his Twenty20 debut during the tournament against Oman, with him making eight further appearances during the tournament, the last of which came against Kenya. In his nine matches, he scored 191 runs at an average of 23.87, with a high score of 39 not out. With the ball, he took just a single wicket, costing him 106 runs from thirteen overs bowled. Italy finished the tournament in tenth place and therefore missed out on qualification for the 2012 World Twenty in Sri Lanka.

In April 2013, he was selected in Italy's fourteen man squad for the World Cricket League Division Three in Bermuda.
