= Martin Pedersen (cricketer) =

Danish cricketer (born 1988)

Personal information
- Full name: Martin Nuka Lennert Pedersen
- Born: 24 May 1988 (age 38); Sisimiut, Qeqqata, Greenland; Kingdom of Denmark
- Batting: Right-handed
- Bowling: Right-arm medium

International information
- National side: Denmark

Career statistics
Competition	Twenty20
Matches	3
Runs scored	28
Batting average	28.00
100s/50s	0/0
Top score	23
Catches/stumpings	1/–
- Source: Cricinfo, 18 March 2024

Martin Nuka Lennert Pedersen (born 24 May 1988) is a Danish and Greenlandic cricketer. Pedersen is a right-handed batsman who bowls right-arm medium pace. He was born at Sisimiut, Qeqqata, Greenland. During his career, he represented Denmark internationally on multiple occasions, such as the 2012 World Twenty20 Qualifier and 2011 ICC World Cricket League Division Three.

== Early life and youth career ==
Pedersen was born on 24 May 1988 in Sisimiut, Qeqqata, Greenland of the Kingdom of Denmark.

He made his international debut for the Denmark at the 2003 European Under-15 Championship and made a total of three appearances during the tournament. Two years later, he competed for Denmark at the first division of the 2005 European Under-17 Championship and made four appearances during the tournament. He also made appearances for Denmark at the 2007 European Under-19 Championship and 2008 and 2009 European A Championships.

== Career ==
Having represented Denmark at the Under-19 level and for Denmark A, Pedersen was selected in 2010 to play for Denmark in the European Cricket Championship Division One. The following year he was part of Denmark's squad for World Cricket League Division Three in Hong Kong, making his full international debut against Italy. He made a total of six appearances during the tournament.

In March 2012, Denmark took part in the World Twenty20 Qualifier in the United Arab Emirates, with Pedersen selected for the tournament. He made his Twenty20 debut during it against Canada at the Sheikh Zayed Cricket Stadium. He made two further appearances during the competition, against Papua New Guinea and Oman, scoring 28 runs. In the same year, Pedersen started his club career and competed in the elite division of the Danish Cricket League. In his last years of his club career in 2013, he competed for Kolding.

Pedersen returned to cricket in 2015 as part of the Denmark A team against the Marylebone Cricket Club for three matches before retiring again.
