= Jacob Larsen (cricketer) =

Danish cricketer (1979–2023)

Personal information
- Born: 12 January 1979; Egvad, Ringkøbing County, Denmark
- Died: 5 July 2023 (aged 44)
- Nickname: Jalle
- Batting: Left-handed
- Bowling: Right-arm medium

International information
- National side: Denmark

Career statistics
Competition	List A	Twenty20
Matches	1	2
Runs scored	12	8
Batting average	12.00	4.00
100s/50s	0/0	0/0
Top score	12	7
Balls bowled	60	6
Wickets	1	0
Bowling average	38.00	–
5 wickets in innings	0	–
10 wickets in match	0	–
Best bowling	1/38	–
Catches/stumpings	1/–	0/–
- Source: Cricinfo, 23 March 2012

Jacob Larsen (12 January 1979 – 5 July 2023) was a Danish cricketer. Larsen was a left-handed batsman who bowled right-arm medium pace.

== Career ==
Larsen represented Denmark Under-19s in six One Day Internationals in 1998. A decade later, he made his full debut for Denmark at Svanholm Park, Brøndby, against the touring Marylebone Cricket Club. The following year he was selected in Denmark's squad for the World Cup Qualifier in South Africa, playing in a single List A match during the tournament against Oman scoring 12 runs at number ten in Denmark's innings of 220, before he was dismissed by Hemal Mehta. With the ball, he bowled ten overs for 38 runs, taking the wicket of Hemin Desai. Denmark lost the match by 5 wickets.

In 2011, Larsen was selected as part of Denmark's squad for the 2011 ICC World Cricket League Division Three tournament in Hong Kong, making five appearances. In March 2012, Denmark took part in the World Twenty20 Qualifier in the United Arab Emirates, with Larsen selected in their fourteen-man squad. Larsen made his Twenty20 debut during the tournament against the Netherlands at the ICC Global Cricket Academy. He made a further appearance during the competition against Oman. He scored 8 runs in his two matches, while with the ball he bowled just a single over.

Outside of playing the game, Larsen worked for the Dansk Cricket Forbund as a youth development officer, and later he also went on tour as the national team's physiotherapist.

== Personal life and death ==
Jacob Larsen was born at Egvad, Ringkøbing County on 12 January 1979. He died on 5 July 2023, at the age of 44.

Danish Cricket Federation
(@dcfcricket)
tweeted:

We are saddened to report the passing of larger than life cricket personality, Jacob “Jalle” Larsen who passed through the night.

Jalle played 2 T20s and 1 ListA match for Denmark, and played in the elite domestic T20 series this season for his beloved Herning.

RIP Jacob Larsen

Jul 5, 2023
