= Hitolo Areni =

Papua New Guinean cricketer

Personal information
- Born: 31 August 1980 (age 46); Port Moresby, Papua New Guinea
- Batting: Right-handed
- Bowling: Right-arm fast-medium
- Role: Bowler

Career statistics
Competition	List A
Matches	5
Runs scored	11
Batting average	5.50
100s/50s	0/0
Top score	6*
Balls bowled	210
Wickets	8
Bowling average	21.87
5 wickets in innings	0
10 wickets in match	0
Best bowling	4/37
Catches/stumpings	0/0
- Source: CricketArchive, 14 July 2008

Hitolo Areni (born 31 August 1980) is a Papua New Guinean cricketer. A right-handed batsman and right-arm fast-medium bowler, he has played for the Papua New Guinea national cricket team since 2005.

== Biography ==
Born in Port Moresby in 1980, Hitolo Areni first played for a combined East Asia Pacific team in the Australian National Country Cricket Championship in 2005 before making his debut for Papua New Guinea against Italy in Kuala Lumpur the following month.

He made his List A debut in the 2005 ICC Trophy in Ireland and again played for the combined East Asia Pacific team in the Australian National Country Cricket Championship in 2006, and has played in the tournament every year since, and most recently represented his country in Division Three of the World Cricket League in Darwin in 2007.
