= Rashard Marshall =

American cricketer

Personal information
- Full name: Rashard Antonio Marshall
- Born: 30 August 1982 (age 44)
- Batting: Right-handed
- Relatives: Xavier Marshall (cousin)

International information
- National side: United States

Career statistics
Competition	T20
Matches	3
Runs scored	19
Batting average	9.50
100s/50s	–/–
Top score	19
Balls bowled	–
Wickets	–
Bowling average	–
5 wickets in innings	–
10 wickets in match	–
Best bowling	–
Catches/stumpings	–/–
- Source: Cricinfo, 7 March 2010

Rashard Antonio Marshall (born 30 August 1982) is an American former cricketer. Marshall is a right-handed batsman who represented the United States national cricket team.

Marshall made his debut for the United States against Mozambique in the 2008 ICC World Cricket League Division Five. Marshall played 8 matches for the United States in the tournament.

Later in 2008 Marshall represented the United States in the 2008 ICC Americas Championship Division One, where he played matches against Suriname, Argentina, the Cayman Islands, Bermuda and Canada as the United States went on to win the tournament.

In 2010 he made his unofficial Twenty20 debut for the United States against the UAE in a pre-tournament warm up match for the 2010 ICC World Twenty20 Qualifier. During the tournament Marshall made his full Twenty20 debut against Scotland, where the USA went on to win by 6 wickets. He followed this up by playing matches against Ireland and Afghanistan, both of which the United States lost.

In February 2010, Marshall represented the United States in the 2010 ICC World Cricket League Division Five, where the United States won promotion to the 2010 ICC World Cricket League Division Four in Italy.

In August 2010, Marshall and the United States competed in the Division Four tournament, and earned their second straight promotion, and competed in the 2011 ICC World Cricket League Division Three. Marshall had an average of 75 for the tournament, including an innings of 122 not out in the win over Argentina that clinched the United States's promotion.
