= Vaibhav Wategaonkar =

Indian cricketer (born 1982)

Personal information
- Full name: Vaibhav Shridhar Wategaonkar
- Born: 30 August 1982 (age 44); Mumbai, Maharashtra, India
- Batting: Left-handed
- Role: Batsman

International information
- National side: Oman
- T20I debut (cap 17): 19 February 2016 v Hong Kong
- Last T20I: 20 February 2016 v Afghanistan

Career statistics
Competition	T20I	LA	T20
Matches	2	5	12
Runs scored	14	200	115
Batting average	14.00	50.00	11.50
100s/50s	0/0	1/0	0/0
Top score	14	114*	30
Balls bowled	–	18	–
Wickets	–	1	–
Bowling average	–	13.00	–
5 wickets in innings	–	0	–
10 wickets in match	–	0	–
Best bowling	–	1/13	–
Catches/stumpings	1/–	2/–	6/–
- Source: CricketArchive, 11 March 2016

Vaibhav Shridhar Wategaonkar (born 30 August 1982) is an Indian-born cricketer who plays for the Oman national cricket team. He has played at List A level for Oman in the 2007 ICC World Cricket League Division Two.

Wategaonkar made his debut against Argentina on 24 November 2007, and helped his team to an 18-run victory with 42 and the wicket of Donnie Forrester. Two matches later, against Namibia, Wategaonkar made his maiden List A century with an unbeaten 114, becoming man of the match in a two-wicket Oman win.

He made his Twenty20 International debut for Oman against Hong Kong in the 2016 Asia Cup Qualifier on 19 February 2016.

In January 2018, he was named in Oman's squad for the 2018 ICC World Cricket League Division Two tournament, and in August 2018, for the 2018 Asia Cup Qualifier tournament.
