= Orlando Baker =

Jamaican-born American cricketer (born 1979)

Personal information
- Full name: Orlando M. Baker
- Born: 15 September 1979 (age 47); St Catherine, Jamaica
- Batting: Right-handed
- Bowling: Right-arm medium
- Role: Batsman

Domestic team information
- Years: Team
- 2001: Jamaica
- Only FC: 2 February 2001 Jamaica v England A
- Source: CricketArchive, 7 October 2008

Orlando M. Baker (born 15 September 1979) is a Jamaican-born American cricketer. A right-handed batsman and right-arm medium pace bowler, he made his debut for the United States national cricket team in 2008, having previously played first-class cricket for his native Jamaica. He retired from cricket in June 2015.

== Biography ==
Born in St Catherine in 1979, Orlando Baker first represented Jamaica at the under-19 level, playing in the Nortel Youth Tournament in 1996 and 1997, also playing for them in matches against a Nortel All Star XI and Pakistan Under-19s in 1996. He played his only first-class match for Jamaica in 2001, a Busta Cup match against England A. He scored a total of five runs in the match.

Often considered as one of the best USA international players, he first played for the US in Division Five of the World Cricket League in Jersey in 2008, playing eight matches in the tournament and finishing as the USA's second highest run scorer in the tournament. He made his Twenty20 debut on 9 February 2010, for the United States in the 2010 ICC World Twenty20 Qualifier in the United Arab Emirates.

In 2012, Baker was selected as to be a part of the United States national cricket team at the 2012 ICC World Twenty20 Qualifier in the United Arab Emirates in March 2012. Later in the same year he was selected for the 2012 ICC World Cricket League Division Four which takes place from 3 to 10 September 2012 in Malaysia.

He currently coaches an academy called HPC (High Potential Cricket), leading them to academic success.
