= 2012 World Twenty20 =

Fourth edition of the ICC Men's T20 World Cup

2012 ICC World Twenty20
- Dates: 18 September – 7 October 2012
- Administrator: International Cricket Council
- Cricket format: Twenty20 International
- Tournament format(s): Group stage and knockout
- Host: Sri Lanka
- Champions: West Indies (1st title)
- Runners-up: Sri Lanka
- Participants: 12
- Matches: 27
- Player of the series: (Australia) Shane Watson
- Most runs: (Australia) Shane Watson (249)
- Most wickets: (Sri Lanka) Ajantha Mendis (15)
- Official website: www.icc-cricket.com

The 2012 ICC World Twenty20 was the fourth edition of the Men's T20 World Cup, formerly known as the ICC World Twenty20, an international Twenty20 cricket tournament that took place in Sri Lanka from 18 September to 7 October 2012 which was won by the West Indies. This was the first World Twenty20 tournament held in an Asian country, the last three having been held in South Africa, England and the West Indies. Sri Lankan pacer Lasith Malinga had been chosen as the event ambassador of the tournament by ICC. The format had four groups of three teams in a preliminary round. It was the last edition with 12 teams format before it was expanded to 16 teams.

Match fixtures were announced on 21 September 2011 by ICC. On the same date, the ICC also unveiled the logo of the tournament, named "Modern Spin".

== Background ==
The 2012 World Twenty20 is the fourth edition of the Twenty20 tournament. The first was hosted by South Africa in 2007, where India beat Pakistan in a thriller to become Twenty20 champions. Pakistan, the losing finalists in 2007, defeated Sri Lanka in 2009 tournament to become World T20 Champions, held in England. In 2010 England became the third World Twenty20 champions by beating Australia in the West Indies.

== Format ==
The format is the same as the 2010 edition. The format has four groups of three in a preliminary round, groups A-D. In addition to the ten test cricket playing nations, there are two associate/affiliate teams who qualified from the 2012 ICC World Twenty20 Qualifier staged in the United Arab Emirates on 13–14 March 2012.

The top two teams from each group A-D proceed to the Super Eight stage of the tournament. The Super Eights consist of two groups 1 & 2. The top two teams from the Super Eight groups play the semi-finals, and the semi-final winners contest the final to determine the world champions in Twenty20 cricket. England are the defending champions, having won the 2010 edition in the West Indies.

The Super Eight stage consists of the top two teams from each group of the group stage. The teams are split into two groups, Groups 1 and 2. Group 1 will consist of the top seed from Groups A and C, and the second seed of groups B and D. Group 2 will consist of the top seed from Groups B and D, and the second seed of groups A and C. The seedings used are those allocated at the start of the tournament and are not affected by group stage results, with the exception of if a non-seeded team knocks out a seeded team, the non-seeded team inherits the seed of the knocked-out team.

During the group stage and Super Eight, points are awarded to the teams as follows:

| Results | Points |
|---|---|
| Win | 2 points |
| No result | 1 point |
| Loss | 0 point |

In case of a tie (i.e. both teams score exactly the same number of runs at the end of their respective innings), a Super Over decides the winner. This is applicable in all stages of the tournament.

Within each group (both group stage & Super Eight stage), teams are ranked against each other based on the following criteria:

1. Higher number of points
2. If equal, higher number of wins
3. If still equal, higher Net run rate
4. If still equal, lower bowling strike rate
5. If still equal, result of head-to-head meeting.

== Qualification ==
Teams from every ICC Region :

Africa (2)

- South Africa
- Zimbabwe

Americas (1)

- West Indies

Asia (5)

- Afghanistan
- Bangladesh
- India
- Pakistan
- Sri Lanka (host)

East Asia-Pacific (2)

- Australia
- New Zealand

Europe (2)

- England
- Ireland

Earlier, the ICC development committee had expanded the global qualification system for the World Twenty20, to give the Associate and Affiliate members of the governing body a chance to feature in the tournament. The qualification tournament, which was contested by eight teams in February 2010, featured 16 sides when it was held in early 2012 ahead of the World Twenty20 in Sri Lanka, later that year.

== Venues ==
All matches were played at the following three grounds in Pallekele, Colombo and Hambantota:

| Pallekele | Colombo | Hambantota |
|---|---|---|
| Pallekele Cricket Stadium | R. Premadasa Stadium | Mahinda Rajapaksa Stadium |
| Capacity: 35,000 | Capacity: 35,000 | Capacity: 35,000 |
2012 World Twenty20 is located in Sri Lanka

== Match officials ==
=== Umpires ===
| Umpire | Country | Panel |
|---|---|---|
| Billy Bowden | New Zealand | Elite |
| Aleem Dar | Pakistan | Elite |
| Steve Davis | Australia | Elite |
| Kumar Dharmasena | Sri Lanka | Elite |
| Marais Erasmus | South Africa | Elite |
| Ian Gould | England | Elite |
| Tony Hill | New Zealand | Elite |
| Richard Kettleborough | England | Elite |
| Nigel Llong | England | Elite |
| Asad Rauf | Pakistan | Elite |
| Simon Taufel | Australia | Elite |
| Rod Tucker | Australia | Elite |
| Bruce Oxenford | Australia | International |

=== Referees ===
| Referee | Country |
|---|---|
| Ranjan Madugalle | Sri Lanka |
| Jeff Crowe | New Zealand |
| Javagal Srinath | India |
| Graeme Labrooy (women's event) | Sri Lanka |

== Groups ==
The groups were announced on 21 September 2011.

Group A

- England A1
- India A2
- Afghanistan Q2

Group B

- Australia B1
- West Indies B2
- Ireland Q1

Group C

- Sri Lanka C1
- South Africa C2
- Zimbabwe

Group D

- Pakistan D1
- New Zealand D2
- Bangladesh

== Warm-up matches ==
12 warm-up matches were played between 12 and 19 September featuring all 12 teams.

Fixtures

13 September
09:30
Scorecard

| Ireland; 181/5 (20 overs) | v | Zimbabwe; 127/8 (20 overs) |
| Niall O'Brien 62 (49); Chris Mpofu 3/39 (4 overs) | | Hamilton Masakadza 44 (27); Alex Cusack 3/6 (3 overs) |

Ireland won by 54 runs
Moors Sports Club Ground, Colombo
Umpires: Asoka de Silva (SL) and Ruchira Palliyaguru (SL)

- Zimbabwe won the toss and elected to field.

13 September
09:30
Scorecard

| West Indies; 132/6 (20 overs) | v | Sri Lanka; 135/1 (15.4 overs) |
| Johnson Charles 30 (26); Nuwan Kulasekara 2/35 (4 overs) | | Mahela Jayawardene 57* (35); Ravi Rampaul 1/24 (4 overs) |

Sri Lanka won by 9 wickets
Nondescripts Cricket Club Ground, Colombo
Umpires: Ranmore Martinesz (SL) and Tyron Wijewardene (SL)

- Sri Lanka won the toss and elected to field

15 September
09:30
Scorecard

| Afghanistan; 209/7 (20 overs) | v | Sri Lanka A 151 (18.2 overs) |
| Mohammad Nabi 51 (24); Kaushal Lokuarachchi 3/16 (4 overs) | | Kosala Kulasekera 63 (38); Dawlat Zadran 3/22 (3.2 overs) |

Afghanistan won by 51 runs
Moors Sports Club Ground, Colombo
Umpires: Ian Gould (ENG) and Aleem Dar (PAK)

- Sri Lanka won the toss and elected to field

15 September
09:30
Scorecard

| Australia; 139/6 (20 overs) | v | New Zealand; 83 (17 overs) |
| Shane Watson 27 (32); Adam Milne 2/27 (4 overs) | | Ross Taylor 22 (20); Brad Hogg 3/23 (4 overs) |

Australia won by 56 runs
Nondescripts Cricket Club Ground, Colombo
Umpires: Kumar Dharmasena (SL) and Richard Kettleborough (ENG)

- New Zealand won the toss and elected to field

15 September
09:30
Scorecard

| Zimbabwe; 134/6 (20 overs) | v | Bangladesh; 135/5 (18.2 overs) |
| Vusi Sibanda 40 (47); Abdur Razzak 2/21 (4 overs) | | Mohammad Ashraful 38 (25); Graeme Cremer 2/10 (4 overs) |

Bangladesh won by 5 wickets
Colts Cricket Club Ground, Colombo
Umpires: Marais Erasmus (SA) and Rod Tucker (AUS)

- Bangladesh won the toss and elected to field

15 September
09:30
Scorecard

| India; 146/5 (20 overs) | v | Sri Lanka; 120 (19.3 overs) |
| M S Dhoni 55* (42); Nuwan Kulasekara 2/39 (4 overs) | | Kumar Sangakkara 32 (32); Irfan Pathan 5/25 (4 overs) |

India won by 26 runs
P Sara Oval, Colombo
Umpires: Steve Davis (AUS) and Simon Taufel (AUS)

- India won the toss and elected to bat

17 September
09:30
Scorecard

| England; 172/6 (20 overs) | v | Australia; 163/6 (20 overs) |
| Alex Hales 52 (32); Mitchell Starc 2/32 (4 overs) | | Michael Hussey 71 (51); Steven Finn 2/26 (4 overs) |

England won by 9 runs
Nondescripts Cricket Club Ground, Colombo
Umpires: Marais Erasmus (SA) and Tony Hill (NZ)

- Australia won the toss and elected to field

17 September
09:30
Scorecard

| Ireland; 164/6 (20 overs) | v | Bangladesh; 159/9 (20 overs) |
| Paul Stirling 98 (41); Shakib Al Hasan 2/21 (4 overs) | | Shakib Al Hasan 44 (23); Kevin O'Brien 3/24 (4 overs) |

Ireland won by 5 runs
Moors Sports Club Ground, Colombo
Umpires: Ruchira Palliyaguru (SL) and Ravindra Wimalasiri (SL)

- Bangladesh won the toss and elected to field
- Match start delayed due to wet ground condition

17 September
13:30
Scorecard

| South Africa; 186/6 (20 overs) | v | New Zealand; 177/8 (20 overs) |
| AB de Villiers 89 (30); Adam Milne 2/26 (4 overs) | | Ross Taylor 75 (42); Dale Steyn 4/25 (4 overs) |

South Africa won by 9 runs
Colts Cricket Club Ground, Colombo
Umpires: Bruce Oxenford (AUS) and Tyron Wijewardene (SL)

- New Zealand won the toss and elected to field
- Match start delayed due to rain

17 September
14:00
Scorecard

| Afghanistan; 122/7 (20 overs) | v | West Indies; 125/2 (15.5 overs) |
| Asghar Stanikzai 53 (50); Fidel Edwards 3/24 (4 overs) | | Chris Gayle 78* (48); Mohammad Nabi 2/29 (4 overs) |

West Indies won by 8 wickets
P Sara Oval, Colombo
Umpires: Asoka de Silva (SL) and Sena Nandiweera (SL)

- Afghanistan won the toss and elected to bat
- Match start delayed due to wet ground condition

17 September
14:00
Scorecard

| India; 185/3 (20 overs) | v | Pakistan; 186/5 (19.1 overs) |
| Virat Kohli 75* (47); Saeed Ajmal 2/22 (4 overs) | | Kamran Akmal 92* (50); Ravichandran Ashwin 4/23 (4 overs) |

Pakistan won by 5 wickets
R. Premadasa Stadium, Colombo
Umpires: Billy Bowden (NZ) and Nigel Llong (ENG)

- India won the toss and elected to bat

19 September
09:30
Scorecard

| England; 111 (19.3 overs) | v | Pakistan; 96/9 (20 overs) |
| Luke Wright 38 (36); Saeed Ajmal 4/14 (4 overs) | | Asad Shafiq 20 (20); Jade Dernbach 3/14 (4 overs) |

England won by 15 runs
P Sara Oval, Colombo
Umpires: Ranmore Martinesz (SL) and Tyron Wijewardene (SL)

- England won the toss and elected to bat

== Group stage ==
There were 27 matches played during the 2012 ICC World Twenty20, 12 in group stages, 12 in Super Eights, two Semi-finals and a final.

All times given are Sri Lanka Standard Time (UTC+05:30)

=== Group A ===
| Pos | Seed | Team | Pld | W | L | NR | Pts | NRR |
|---|---|---|---|---|---|---|---|---|
| 1 | A2 | India | 2 | 2 | 0 | 0 | 4 | 2.825 |
| 2 | A1 | England | 2 | 1 | 1 | 0 | 2 | 0.650 |
| 3 | | Afghanistan | 2 | 0 | 2 | 0 | 0 | −3.475 |

19 September
19:30 (D/N)
Scorecard

| India; 159/5 (20 overs) | v | Afghanistan; 136 (19.3 overs) |
| Virat Kohli 50 (39); Shapoor Zadran 3/33 (4 overs) | | Mohammad Nabi 31 (23); Lakshmipathy Balaji 3/19 (3.3 overs) |

India won by 23 runs
R. Premadasa Stadium, Colombo
Umpires: Asad Rauf (Pak) and Simon Taufel (Aus)
Player of the match: Virat Kohli (Ind)

- Afghanistan won the toss and elected to field
- Twenty20 International debut: Najibullah Zadran (Afg)

21 September
19:30 (D/N)
Scorecard

| England; 196/5 (20 overs) | v | Afghanistan; 80 (17.2 overs) |
| Luke Wright 99* (55); Izatullah Dawlatzai 2/56 (3 overs) | | Gulbadin Naib 44 (32); Samit Patel 2/6 (3 overs) |

England won by 116 runs
R. Premadasa Stadium, Colombo
Umpires: Kumar Dharmasena (SL) and Simon Taufel (Aus)
Player of the match: Luke Wright (Eng)

- Afghanistan won the toss and elected to field
- England and India qualified for the Super Eights and Afghanistan were eliminated as a result of this match

23 September
19:30 (D/N)
Scorecard

| India; 170/4 (20 overs) | v | England; 80 (14.4 overs) |
| Rohit Sharma 55* (33); Steven Finn 2/33 (4 overs) | | Craig Kieswetter 35 (25); Harbhajan Singh 4/12 (4 overs) |

India won by 90 runs
R. Premadasa Stadium, Colombo
Umpires: Aleem Dar (Pak) and Simon Taufel (Aus)
Player of the match: Harbhajan Singh (Ind)

- England won the toss and elected to field
- This was England's lowest Twenty20 International score
- England's 80 all out was the lowest total for a Test-playing nation in ICC World Twenty20

=== Group B ===
| Pos | Seed | Team | Pld | W | L | NR | Pts | NRR |
|---|---|---|---|---|---|---|---|---|
| 1 | B1 | Australia | 2 | 2 | 0 | 0 | 4 | 2.184 |
| 2 | B2 | West Indies | 2 | 0 | 1 | 1 | 1 | −1.855 |
| 3 | | Ireland | 2 | 0 | 1 | 1 | 1 | −2.092 |

19 September
15:30 (D/N)
Scorecard

| Ireland; 123/7 (20 overs) | v | Australia; 125/3 (15.1 overs) |
| Kevin O'Brien 35 (29); Shane Watson 3/26 (4 overs) | | Shane Watson 51 (30); Kevin O'Brien 1/18 (3 overs) |

Australia won by 7 wickets
R. Premadasa Stadium, Colombo
Umpires: Aleem Dar (Pak) and Kumar Dharmasena (SL)
Player of the match: Shane Watson (Aus)

- Ireland won the toss and elected to bat

22 September
19:30 (D/N)
Scorecard

| West Indies; 191/8 (20 overs) | v | Australia; 100/1 (9.1 overs) |
| Chris Gayle 54 (33); Mitchell Starc 3/35 (4 overs) | | Shane Watson 41* (24); Fidel Edwards 1/16 (2 overs) |

Australia won by 17 runs (D/L method)
R. Premadasa Stadium, Colombo
Umpires: Aleem Dar (Pak) and Asad Rauf (Pak)
Player of the match: Shane Watson (Aus)

- West Indies won the toss and elected to bat
- Match abandoned after 9.1 overs due to rain
- D/L par score at 9.1 overs with one wicket lost was 83, hence the winning margin was 17 runs
- Australia qualified for the Super Eights as a result of this match

24 September
19:30 (D/N)
Scorecard

| Ireland; 129/6 (19 overs) | v | West Indies |
| Niall O'Brien 25 (21); Chris Gayle 2/21 (3 overs) |

No result
R. Premadasa Stadium, Colombo
Umpires: Asad Rauf (Pak) and Kumar Dharmasena (SL)

- West Indies won the toss and elected to field
- The match was reduced to 19 overs per side due to rain
- Match abandoned before West Indies could start their innings
- West Indies qualified for the Super Eights by virtue of a superior Net run rate and Ireland were eliminated

=== Group C ===
| Pos | Seed | Team | Pld | W | L | NR | Pts | NRR |
|---|---|---|---|---|---|---|---|---|
| 1 | C2 | South Africa | 2 | 2 | 0 | 0 | 4 | 3.598 |
| 2 | C1 | Sri Lanka | 2 | 1 | 1 | 0 | 2 | 1.852 |
| 3 | | Zimbabwe | 2 | 0 | 2 | 0 | 0 | −3.624 |

18 September
19:30 (D/N)
Scorecard

| Sri Lanka; 182/4 (20 overs) | v | Zimbabwe; 100 (17.3 overs) |
| Kumar Sangakkara 44 (26); Graeme Cremer 1/27 (4 overs) | | Hamilton Masakadza 20 (23); Ajantha Mendis 6/8 (4 overs) |

Sri Lanka won by 82 runs
Mahinda Rajapaksa International Cricket Stadium, Sooriyawewa
Umpires: Ian Gould (Eng) and Rod Tucker (Aus)
Player of the match: Ajantha Mendis (SL)

- Zimbabwe won the toss and elected to field
- Twenty20 International Debutants: Dilshan Munaweera (SL) and Brian Vitori (Zim)
- Ajantha Mendis achieved the best bowling figures in Twenty20 Internationals

20 September
19:30 (D/N)
Scorecard

| Zimbabwe; 93/8 (20 overs) | v | South Africa; 94/0 (12.4 overs) |
| Craig Ervine 37 (40); Jacques Kallis 4/15 (4 overs) | | Richard Levi 50* (43) |

South Africa won by 10 wickets
Mahinda Rajapaksa International Cricket Stadium, Sooriyawewa
Umpires: Steve Davis (Aus) and Richard Kettleborough (Eng)
Player of the match: Jacques Kallis (SA)

- South Africa won the toss and elected to field
- South Africa and Sri Lanka qualified for Super Eights and Zimbabwe were eliminated as a result of this match

22 September
15:30 (D/N)
Scorecard

| South Africa; 78/4 (7 overs) | v | Sri Lanka; 46/5 (7 overs) |
| AB de Villiers 30 (13); Nuwan Kulasekara 1/9 (1 over) | | Kumar Sangakkara 13 (11); Dale Steyn 2/10 (2 overs) |

South Africa won by 32 runs
Mahinda Rajapaksa International Cricket Stadium, Sooriyawewa
Umpires: Richard Kettleborough (Eng) and Rod Tucker (Aus)
Player of the match: AB de Villiers (SA)

- Sri Lanka won the toss and elected to field
- The match was reduced to 7 overs per side due to rain.

=== Group D ===
| Pos | Seed | Team | Pld | W | L | NR | Pts | NRR |
|---|---|---|---|---|---|---|---|---|
| 1 | D1 | Pakistan | 2 | 2 | 0 | 0 | 4 | 0.706 |
| 2 | D2 | New Zealand | 2 | 1 | 1 | 0 | 2 | 1.150 |
| 3 | | Bangladesh | 2 | 0 | 2 | 0 | 0 | −1.868 |

21 September
15:30 (D/N)
Scorecard

| New Zealand; 191/3 (20 overs) | v | Bangladesh; 132/8 (20 overs) |
| Brendon McCullum 123 (58); Abdur Razzaq 2/28 (4 overs) | | Nasir Hossain 50 (39); Tim Southee 3/16 (4 overs) |

New Zealand won by 59 runs
Pallekele International Cricket Stadium, Pallekele
Umpires: Marais Erasmus (SA) and Nigel Llong (Eng)
Player of the match: Brendon McCullum (New Zealand)

- Bangladesh won the toss and elected to field

23 September
15:30 (D/N)
Scorecard

| Pakistan; 177/6 (20 overs) | v | New Zealand; 164/9 (20 overs) |
| Nasir Jamshed 56 (35); Tim Southee 2/31 (4 overs) | | Rob Nicol 33 (28); Saeed Ajmal 4/30 (4 overs) |

Pakistan won by 13 runs
Pallekele International Cricket Stadium, Pallekele
Umpires: Marais Erasmus (SA) and Bruce Oxenford (Aus)
Player of the match: Nasir Jamshed (Pakistan)

- Pakistan won the toss and elected to bat

25 September
19:30 (D/N)
Scorecard

| Bangladesh; 175/6 (20 overs) | v | Pakistan; 178/2 (18.4 overs) |
| Shakib Al Hasan 84 (54); Yasir Arafat 3/25 (3 overs) | | Imran Nazir 72 (36); Abul Hasan 2/33 (3 overs) |

Pakistan won by 8 wickets
Pallekele International Cricket Stadium, Pallekele
Umpires: Steve Davis (Aus) and Ian Gould (Eng)
Player of the match: Imran Nazir (Pakistan)

- Bangladesh won the toss and elected to bat
- New Zealand and Pakistan both qualified for the Super Eights and Bangladesh were eliminated as a result of this match
- 175/6 was the highest first innings score for Bangladesh in the ICC T20 World Cup
- This was the highest successful chase by Pakistan in Twenty20 Internationals
- Shakib Al Hasan's 84 off 54 was the highest individual Twenty20 International score by a Bangladeshi player against Pakistan.

== Super 8s ==
Seedings for this stage were allocated at the start of the tournament and were not affected by group stage results, with the exception that if a non-seeded team knocked out a seeded team, it would inherit that team's seeding.

| Qualification | Super 8s | |
| Qualification | Group E | Group F |
|---|---|---|
| Advanced from Group Stage | England | Australia |
| Advanced from Group Stage | New Zealand | India |
| Advanced from Group Stage | Sri Lanka | Pakistan |
| Advanced from Group Stage | West Indies | South Africa |

=== Group E ===
| Pos | Team | Pld | W | L | NR | Pts | NRR |
|---|---|---|---|---|---|---|---|
| 1 | Sri Lanka | 3 | 3 | 0 | 0 | 6 | 0.998 |
| 2 | West Indies | 3 | 2 | 1 | 0 | 4 | −0.375 |
| 3 | England | 3 | 1 | 2 | 0 | 2 | −0.397 |
| 4 | New Zealand | 3 | 0 | 3 | 0 | 0 | −0.169 |

27 September
15:30 (D/N)
Scorecard

| New Zealand; 174/7 (20 overs) | v | Sri Lanka; 174/6 (20 overs) |
| Rob Nicol 58 (30); Akila Dananjaya 2/32 (4 overs) | | Tillakaratne Dilshan 76 (53); James Franklin 2/34 (4 overs) |

Match tied; Sri Lanka won the Super Over
Pallekele International Cricket Stadium, Pallekele
Umpires: Aleem Dar (Pak) and Simon Taufel (Aus)
Player of the match: Tillakaratne Dilshan (SL)

- New Zealand won the toss and elected to bat
- Twenty20 International debut: Akila Dananjaya (SL)

27 September
19:30 (D/N)
Scorecard

| West Indies; 179/5 (20 overs) | v | England; 164/4 (20 overs) |
| Johnson Charles 84 (56); Stuart Broad 2/26 (4 overs) | | Eoin Morgan 71* (36); Ravi Rampaul 2/37 (4 overs) |

West Indies won by 15 runs
Pallekele International Cricket Stadium, Pallekele
Umpires: Asad Rauf (Pak) and Steve Davis (Aus)
Player of the match: Johnson Charles (WI)

- West Indies won the toss and elected to bat
- Eoin Morgan's 50 in 25 balls was fastest for England in the ICC World Twenty20

29 September
15:30 (D/N)
Scorecard

| New Zealand; 148/6 (20 overs) | v | England; 149/4 (18.5 overs) |
| James Franklin 50 (33); Steven Finn 3/16 (4 overs) | | Luke Wright 76 (43); Daniel Vettori 1/20 (4 overs) |

England won by 6 wickets
Pallekele International Cricket Stadium, Pallekele
Umpires: Asad Rauf (Pak) and Simon Taufel (Aus)
Player of the match: Luke Wright (Eng)

- New Zealand won the toss and elected to bat

29 September
19:30 (D/N)
Scorecard

| West Indies; 129/5 (20 overs) | v | Sri Lanka; 130/1 (15.2 overs) |
| Marlon Samuels 50 (35); Nuwan Kulasekara 2/12 (4.0 overs) | | Mahela Jayawardene 65* (49); Ravi Rampaul 1/39 (4 overs) |

Sri Lanka won by 9 wickets
Pallekele International Cricket Stadium, Pallekele
Umpires: Aleem Dar (Pak) and Steve Davis (Aus)
Player of the match: Mahela Jayawardene (SL)

- West Indies won the toss and elected to bat

1 October
15:30 (D/N)
Scorecard

| West Indies; 139 (19.3 overs) | v | New Zealand; 139/7 (20 overs) |
| Chris Gayle 30 (14); Tim Southee 3/21 (4 overs) | | Ross Taylor 62* (40); Sunil Narine 3/20 (4 overs) |

Match tied; West Indies won the Super Over
Pallekele International Cricket Stadium, Pallekele
Umpires: Aleem Dar (Pak) and Asad Rauf (Pak)
Player of the match: Sunil Narine (WI)

- New Zealand won the toss and elected to field
- New Zealand were eliminated as a result of this match

1 October
19:30 (D/N)
Scorecard

| Sri Lanka; 169/6 (20 overs) | v | England; 150/9 (20 overs) |
| Mahela Jayawardene 42 (38); Stuart Broad 3/32 (4 overs) | | Samit Patel 67 (48); Lasith Malinga 5/31 (4 overs) |

Sri Lanka won by 19 runs
Pallekele International Cricket Stadium, Pallekele
Umpires: Steve Davis (Aus) and Simon Taufel (Aus)
Player of the match: Lasith Malinga (SL)

- England won the toss and elected to field
- Sri Lanka and West Indies qualified for the semi-finals and England and New Zealand were eliminated as a result of this match

=== Group F ===
| Pos | Team | Pld | W | L | NR | Pts | NRR |
|---|---|---|---|---|---|---|---|
| 1 | Australia | 3 | 2 | 1 | 0 | 4 | 0.464 |
| 2 | Pakistan | 3 | 2 | 1 | 0 | 4 | 0.273 |
| 3 | India | 3 | 2 | 1 | 0 | 4 | −0.274 |
| 4 | South Africa | 3 | 0 | 3 | 0 | 0 | −0.421 |

28 September
15:30 (D/N)
Scorecard

| South Africa; 133/6 (20 overs) | v | Pakistan; 136/8 (19.4 overs) |
| JP Duminy 48 (38); Mohammad Hafeez 2/23 (4 overs) | | Umar Akmal 43* (41); Dale Steyn 3/22 (4 overs) |

Pakistan won by 2 wickets
R. Premadasa Stadium, Colombo
Umpires: Ian Gould (Eng) and Rod Tucker (Aus)
Player of the match: Umar Gul (Pak)

- South Africa won the toss and elected to bat

28 September
19:30 (D/N)
Scorecard

| India; 140/7 (20 overs) | v | Australia; 141/1 (14.4 overs) |
| Irfan Pathan 31 (30); Shane Watson 3/34 (4 overs) | | Shane Watson 72 (42); Yuvraj Singh 1/16 (2 overs) |

Australia won by 9 wickets
R. Premadasa Stadium, Colombo
Umpires: Kumar Dharmasena (SL) and Richard Kettleborough (Eng)
Player of the match: Shane Watson (Aus)

- India won the toss and elected to bat

30 September
15:30 (D/N)
Scorecard

| South Africa; 146/5 (20 overs) | v | Australia; 147/2 (17.4 overs) |
| Robin Peterson 32* (19); Xavier Doherty 3/20 (4 overs) | | Shane Watson 70 (47); Morne Morkel 1/23 (3 overs) |

Australia won by 8 wickets
R. Premadasa Stadium, Colombo
Umpires: Kumar Dharmasena (SL) and Ian Gould (Eng)
Player of the match: Shane Watson (Aus)

- Australia won the toss and elected to field

30 September
19:30 (D/N)
Scorecard

| Pakistan; 128 (19.4 overs) | v | India; 129/2 (17 overs) |
| Shoaib Malik 28 (22); Lakshmipathy Balaji 3/22 (3.4 overs) | | Virat Kohli 78* (61); Raza Hasan 1/22 (4 overs) |

India won by 8 wickets
R. Premadasa Stadium, Colombo
Umpires: Richard Kettleborough (Eng) and Rod Tucker (Aus)
Player of the match: Virat Kohli (Ind)

- Pakistan won the toss and elected to bat

2 October
15:30 (D/N)
Scorecard

| Pakistan; 149/6 (20 overs) | v | Australia; 117/7 (20 overs) |
| Nasir Jamshed 55 (46); Mitchell Starc 3/20 (4 overs) | | Michael Hussey 54* (47); Saeed Ajmal 3/17 (4 overs) |

Pakistan won by 32 runs
R. Premadasa Stadium, Colombo
Umpires: Ian Gould (Eng) and Richard Kettleborough (Eng)
Player of the match: Raza Hasan (Pak)

- Australia won the toss and elected to field
- Australia qualified for the semi-finals by virtue of a superior Net run rate and South Africa were eliminated as a result of this match

2 October
19:30 (D/N)
Scorecard

| India; 152/6 (20 overs) | v | South Africa; 151 (19.5 overs) |
| Suresh Raina 45 (34); Robin Peterson 2/25 (4 overs) | | Faf du Plessis 65 (38); Zaheer Khan 3/22 (4 overs) |

India won by 1 run
R. Premadasa Stadium, Colombo
Umpires: Kumar Dharmasena (SL) and Rod Tucker (Aus)
Player of the match: Yuvraj Singh (Ind)

- South Africa won the toss and elected to field
- This was the last T20I game for Lakshmipathy Balaji, Zaheer Khan, Irfan Pathan and Virender Sehwag
- Pakistan qualified for the semi-finals by virtue of a superior Net run rate (becoming the first team to qualify for four consecutive ICC World Twenty20 semi-finals) and India were eliminated as a result of this match

== Knockout stage ==
Semifinals
1 | Sri Lanka | 139/4 (20 overs)
4 | Pakistan | 123/7 (20 overs)
3 | West Indies | 205/4 (20 overs)
2 | Australia | 131 (16.4 overs)

Final
West Indies | 137/6 (20 overs)
Sri Lanka | 101 (18.4 overs)

=== Semi-finals ===
4 October
19:00 (D/N)
Scorecard

| Sri Lanka; 139/4 (20 overs) | v | Pakistan; 123/7 (20 overs) |
| Mahela Jayawardene 42 (36); Mohammed Hafeez 1/12 (2 overs) | | Mohammed Hafeez 42 (40); Rangana Herath 3/25 (4 overs) |

Sri Lanka won by 16 runs
R. Premadasa Stadium, Colombo
Attendance : 35,000
Umpires: Simon Taufel (Aus) and Rod Tucker (Aus)
Player of the match: Mahela Jayawardene (SL)

- Sri Lanka won the toss and elected to bat

5 October
19:00 (D/N)
Scorecard

| West Indies; 205/4 (20 overs) | v | Australia; 131 (16.4 overs) |
| Chris Gayle 75* (41); Pat Cummins 2/36 (4 overs) | | George Bailey 63 (29); Ravi Rampaul 3/16 (3.4 overs) |

West Indies won by 74 runs
R. Premadasa Stadium, Colombo
Attendance : 22,345
Umpires: Aleem Dar (Pak) and Kumar Dharmasena (Sri)
Player of the match: Chris Gayle (WI)

- West Indies won the toss and elected to bat
- This was Australia's second consecutive semi final

=== Final ===
7 October
19:00 (D/N)
Scorecard

| West Indies; 137/6 (20 overs) | v | Sri Lanka; 101 (18.4 overs) |
| Marlon Samuels 78 (56); Ajantha Mendis 4/12 (4 overs) | | Mahela Jayawardene 33 (36); Sunil Narine 3/9 (3.4 overs) |

West Indies won by 36 runs
R. Premadasa Stadium, Colombo
Attendance : 35,000
Umpires: Aleem Dar (Pak) and Simon Taufel (Aus)
Player of the match: Marlon Samuels (WI)

- West Indies won the toss and elected to bat

== Statistics ==
=== Most Runs ===
| Player | Inns | Runs | Ave | SR | HS | 100 | 50 | 4s | 6s |
|---|---|---|---|---|---|---|---|---|---|
| (Australia) Shane Watson | 6 | 249 | 49.80 | 150.00 | 72 | 0 | 3 | 19 | 15 |
| (Sri Lanka) Mahela Jayawardene | 7 | 243 | 40.50 | 116.26 | 65* | 0 | 1 | 29 | 5 |
| (Cricket West Indies) Marlon Samuels | 6 | 230 | 38.33 | 132.94 | 78 | 0 | 3 | 14 | 15 |
| (Cricket West Indies) Chris Gayle | 6 | 222 | 44.40 | 150.00 | 75* | 0 | 3 | 19 | 16 |
| (New Zealand) Brendon McCullum | 5 | 212 | 42.40 | 159.39 | 123* | 1 | 1 | 20 | 10 |

=== Most Wickets ===
| Player | Inns | Wkts | Ave | Econ | BBI | SR | 4WI | 5WI |
|---|---|---|---|---|---|---|---|---|
| (Sri Lanka) Ajantha Mendis | 6 | 15 | 9.80 | 6.12 | 6/8 | 9.6 | 1 | 1 |
| (Australia) Shane Watson | 6 | 11 | 16.00 | 7.33 | 3/26 | 13.0 | 0 | 0 |
| (Australia) Mitchell Starc | 6 | 10 | 16.40 | 6.83 | 3/20 | 14.4 | 0 | 0 |
| (India) Lakshmipathy Balaji | 4 | 9 | 9.77 | 7.33 | 3/19 | 8.0 | 0 | 0 |
| (Pakistan) Saeed Ajmal | 6 | 9 | 18.11 | 6.79 | 4/30 | 16.0 | 1 | 0 |

== Team of the tournament ==
| Player | Role |
|---|---|
| (Cricket West Indies) Chris Gayle | Batsman |
| (Australia) Shane Watson | All-rounder |
| (India) Virat Kohli | Batsman |
| (Sri Lanka) Mahela Jayawardene | Batsman / Captain |
| (England) Luke Wright | Batsman |
| (New Zealand) Brendon McCullum | Batsman / Wicket-keeper |
| (Cricket West Indies) Marlon Samuels | Batsman |
| (Sri Lanka) Lasith Malinga | Bowler |
| (Australia) Mitchell Starc | Bowler |
| (Pakistan) Saeed Ajmal | Bowler |
| (Sri Lanka) Ajantha Mendis | Bowler |
| (India) Suresh Raina | Batsman / 12th man |

== Media coverage ==
| Country/Territory | TV | Radio | Internet |
|---|---|---|---|
| Afghanistan | Lemar TV | Salaam Wantadar | |
| Australia | Fox Sports; Nine Network (Australia matches & finals only) | | foxsports.com.au |
| Brunei Darussalam, Malaysia | Astro | | |
| Bangladesh | Bangladesh Television | Bangladesh Betar | espnstar.com |
| China, Hong Kong, Maldives, Nepal; Papua New Guinea, Singapore | ESPN; Star Sports; Star Cricket | | espnstar.com |
| Canada | Sportsnet | | Sportsnet World Online |
| Caribbean, Central America and South America | ESPN | CMC | ESPN3 |
| Europe excluding the United Kingdom and Ireland | Eurosport 2 | | |
| India | ESPN; STAR Cricket; Doordarshan (India matches only) | All India Radio | www.espnstar.com |
| Ireland, United Kingdom | Sky Sports | BBC; Test Match Sofa (via The Cricketer) | skysports.com |
| Middle East and North Africa | CricOne | 89.1 Radio4 | |
| New Zealand | Sky TV | Radio Sport | |
| Pacific Islands | Fiji TV | | |
| Pakistan | PTV Home (Terrestrial); PTV Sports (Cable); TEN Sports (Cable and IP TV) | PBC; Hum FM; Hot FM (Pakistan matches) | espnstar.com |
| Solomon Islands | Telkom TV | | |
| Sri Lanka | CSN | SLBC | www.csn.lk |
| South Africa | SABC; SuperSport | SABC | supersport.com |
| Sub Saharan Africa | SuperSport | | supersport.com |
| Tonga | Tonga TV | | |
| USA, Puerto Rico, Guam, Mexico, Nicaragua and Panama | ESPN2 (Final only) | | ESPN3 |

== See also ==
- 2012 ICC Women's World Twenty20
