= 2010 ICC World Cricket League Division Five =

2010 ICC WCL Division 5
- Administrator: International Cricket Council
- Cricket format: Limited overs cricket
- Tournament format(s): Round-robin and Knockout
- Host: Nepal
- Champions: Nepal
- Participants: 6
- Matches: 18
- Most runs: (United States) Steve Massiah (289)
- Most wickets: (United States) Kevin Darlington (14)
- Official website: International Cricket Council

The 2010 ICC World Cricket League Division Five was a cricket tournament that took place in February 2010 in Nepal. It formed part of the World Cricket League competition administered by the International Cricket Council, the international governing body for cricket. The tournament was won by Nepal who defeated the United States by 5 wickets in the final.

== Teams ==
Key
†	Denotes relegated teams
†	Denotes unmoved teams
†	Denotes promoted teams

Team	Last outcome
Fiji	5th in 2008 ICC World Cricket League Division Four, Tanzania
Jersey	6th in 2008 ICC World Cricket League Division Four, Tanzania
Nepal	3rd in 2008 ICC World Cricket League Division Five, Jersey
United States	4th in 2008 ICC World Cricket League Division Five, Jersey
Singapore	1st in 2009 ICC World Cricket League Division Six, Singapore
Bahrain	2nd in 2009 ICC World Cricket League Division Six, Singapore

== Squads ==
Bahrain	Fiji	Jersey	Nepal	Singapore	United States
Yaser Sadeq (Captain); Abdul Majeed; Adil Hanif; Ashraf Mughal; Ashraf Yaqoob; Azeem ul Haq; Fahad Sadeq; Halal Abbasi; Imran Sajjad; Numan Yousuf; Qamar Saeed; Rizwan Baig; Shahzad Ahmed (Wk); Tahir Dar; Zafar Zaheer	Josefa Rika (Captain); Greg Browne; Joji Bulabalavu; Iniasi Cakacaka; Josefa Dabea; Maciu Gauna (Wk); Tikovanualevu Kida; Sakaraia Lomani; Sekove Ravoka; Peni Rika; Tavo Sorovakatini (Wk); Tukana Tavo; Taniela Waqaituinayau; Viliame Yabaki	Ryan Driver (Captain); Iain Crocker; Samuel de la Haye; Andrew Dewhurst; Sam Dewhurst; Jonny Gough; Peter Gough; Matt Hague; Thomas le Lievre; Bobby Minty (Wk); Dean Morrison; Alex Noel; Charles Perchard; Ben Stevens	Paras Khadka (C); Mehboob Alam; Binod Bhandari; Amrit Bhattarai; Dipendra Chaudhary; Mahesh Chhetri (Wk); Binod Das; Shakti Gauchan; Gyanendra Malla; Anil Mandal; Basanta Regmi; Sanjam Regmi; Sharad Vesawkar; Rahul Vishwakarma	Monish Arora (Captain); Mulewa Dharmichand; Riaz Hussien; Jackie Munoj-Kumar; Buddhika Mendis; Mirzan Faizal; Mohamed Shoib; Narender Reddy; Anish Param; Pramodh Raja; Chandrasekar Rvenkadaramani (Wk); Saad Janjua; Chetan Suryawanshi; Rohan Tripathi; Arun Vijayan	Steve Massiah (Captain); Timroy Allen; Orlando Baker; Lennox Cush; Kevin Darlington; Sudesh Dhaniram; Glen Hall; Imran Awan; Rashard Marshall; Sushil Nadkarni; Aditya Thyagarajan; Usman Shuja; Saurabh Verma; Carl Wright (Wk); Clayton Lambert (Coach)

== Venues ==
Nepal
Kirtipur	Lalitpur	Bhaktapur
Tribhuvan University International Cricket Ground	Engineering Campus Ground	Birendra Sainik Maha Vidyalaya Ground
Capacity: 15,000	Capacity: 5,000+	Capacity: 2,500+
2010 ICC World Cricket League Division Five is located in Nepal

== Group stage ==
Pos	Team	Pld	W	L	T	NR	Pts	NRR	Promotion or relegation
1	United States	5	4	1	0	0	8	1.371	Met in the final and promoted to Division Four for 2010
2	Nepal	5	4	1	0	0	8	1.351	Met in the final and promoted to Division Four for 2010
3	Singapore	5	4	1	0	0	8	1.347	Met in the 3rd place playoff and remained in Division Five for 2012
4	Bahrain	5	2	3	0	0	4	−0.549	Met in the 3rd place playoff and remained in Division Five for 2012
5	Jersey	5	1	4	0	0	2	−0.579	Met in the 5th place playoff and relegated to Division Six for 2011
6	Fiji	5	0	5	0	0	0	−3.022	Met in the 5th place playoff and relegated to Division Six for 2011

Source: Cricinfo

== Fixtures ==
20 February
Scorecard

Singapore; 224/8 (50 overs)	v	Bahrain; 98 all out (33.3 overs)
Chetan Suryawanshi 54 (63); Adil Hanif 3/40 (5 overs)		Adil Hanif 26 (59); Anish Param 3/7 (3 overs)

Singapore won by 126 runs
Tribhuvan University International Cricket Ground, Kirtipur
Umpires: Farid Malik & Buddhi Pradhan

20 February
Scorecard

Jersey; 174 all out (44.5 overs)	v	Nepal; 176/4 (38 overs)
Dean Morrison 62 (112); Shakti Gauchan 2/12 (3.5 overs)		Paras Khadka 69 (66); Ryan Driver 2/24 (10 overs)

Nepal won by 6 wickets
Birendra Sainik Maha Vidyalaya Ground, Bhaktapur
Umpires: Ashwani Rana & Tyron Wijewardene
Player of the match: Paras Khadka (Nepal)

20 February
Scorecard

United States; 353/8 (50 overs)	v	Fiji; 68 all out (28.2 overs)
Steve Massiah 74 (80); Josefa Dabea 4/84 (8 overs)		Josefa Dabea 13* (60); Kevin Darlington 3/9 (6 overs)

United States won by 285 runs
Engineering Campus Ground, Lalitpur
Umpires: Batumalai Ramani & Sarika Prasad
Player of the match: Steve Massiah (USA)

21 February
Scorecard

Fiji; 122 all out (36.2 overs)	v	Jersey; 123/1 (20.3 overs)
Iniasi Cakacaka 25 (29); Ben Stevens 2/11 (8 overs)		Matt Hague 52* (59); Iniasi Cakacaka 1/47 (8 overs)

Jersey won by 9 wickets
Tribhuvan University International Cricket Ground, Kirtipur
Umpires: Sarika Prasad & Batumalai Ramani
Player of the match: Matt Hague (Jersey)

21 February
Scorecard

United States; 273/6 (50 overs)	v	Bahrain; 254 all out (48.4 overs)
Lennox Cush 91 (90); Zafar Zaheer 3/48 (10 overs)		Imran Sajjad 75 (77); Timroy Allen 2/30 (6 overs)

United States won by 19 runs
Birendra Sainik Maha Vidyalaya Ground, Bhaktapur
Umpires: Neil Harrison & Buddhi Pradhan
Player of the match: Lennox Cush (USA)

21 February
Scorecard

Nepal; 180/9 (50 overs)	v	Singapore; 164 all out (47.5 overs)
Basanta Regmi 54 (61); Mulewa Dharmichand 3/34 (8 overs)		Anish Param 41 (79); Sanjam Regmi 4/28 (8.5 overs)

Nepal won by 16 runs
Engineering Campus Ground, Lalitpur
Umpires: Ashwani Rana & Tyron Wijewardene
Player of the match: Basanta Regmi (Nepal)

23 February
(Scorecard)

United States; 253/6 (50 overs)	v	Jersey; 187/9 (50 overs)
Aditya Thyagarajan 83 (82); Ryan Driver 3/25 (10 overs)		Samuel de la Haye 36 (32); Lennox Cush 4/37 (10 overs)

United States won by 66 runs
Tribhuvan University International Cricket Ground, Kirtipur
Umpires: Buddhi Pradhan & Batumalai Ramani
Player of the match: Carl Wright (USA)

23 February
(Scorecard)

Bahrain; 114 all out (42.5 overs)	v	Nepal; 115/2 (22.5 overs)
Shahzad Ahmed 27 (33); Basanta Regmi 4/11 (8.5 overs)		Paras Khadka 71 (74); Adil Hanif 1/9 (3 overs)

Nepal won by 8 wickets
Birendra Sainik Maha Vidyalaya Ground, Bhaktapur
Umpires: Sarika Prasad & Tyron Wijewardene
Player of the match: Paras Khadka (Nepal)

- Match reduced to 47 overs per side

23 February
(Scorecard)

Fiji; 194 all out (48.5 overs)	v	Singapore; 198/8 (47.4 overs)
Josefa Rika 32 (47); Pramodh Raja 4/26 (10 overs)		Monish Arora 94 (133); Sakaraia Lomani 3/33 (10 overs)

Singapore won by 2 wickets
Engineering Campus Ground, Lalitpur
Umpires: Farid Malik & Neil Harrison
Player of the match: Monish Arora (Singapore)

24 February
(Scorecard)

Nepal; 267/7 (50 overs)	v	Fiji; 74 all out (26.4 overs)
Sharad Vesawkar 105 (134); Tukana Tavo 3/45 (10 overs)		Maciu Gauna 13 (25); Basanta Regmi 4/11 (5.4 overs)

Nepal won by 193 runs
Tribhuvan University International Cricket Ground, Kirtipur
Umpires: Neil Harrison & Sarika Prasad
Player of the match: Sharad Vesawkar (Nepal)

24 February
(Scorecard)

Bahrain; 264/7 (50 overs)	v	Jersey; 237 all out (46.5 overs)
Qamar Saeed 50 (57); Alex Noel 2/22 (6 overs)		Ryan Driver 80 (131); Qamar Saeed 6/33 (9.5 overs)

Bahrain won by 27 runs
Birendra Sainik Maha Vidyalaya Ground, Bhaktapur
Umpires: Farid Malik & Ashwani Rana
Player of the match: Qamar Saeed (Bahrain)

24 February
(Scorecard)

Singapore; 245/9 (50 overs)	v	United States; 146 all out (37.5 overs)
Narender Reddy 51 (72); Kevin Darlington 4/65 (10 overs)		Steve Massiah 50 (98); Jackie Manoj-Kumar 4/23 (8 overs)

Singapore won by 99 runs
Engineering Campus Ground, Lalitpur
Umpires: Buddhi Pradhan & Tyron Wijewardene
Player of the match: Narender Reddy (Singapore)

26 February
(Scorecard)

Nepal; 162/9 (50 overs)	v	United States; 159/5 (33.3 overs)
Gyanendra Malla 52 (81); Kevin Darlington 3/23 (10 overs)		Sushil Nadkarni 57* (59); Mehboob Alam 1/12 (2 overs)

United States by 5 wickets
Tribhuvan University International Cricket Ground, Kirtipur
Umpires: Sarika Prasad (SIN) & Tyron Wijewardene (SRI)

- 4 overs lost in the USA innings due to crowd trouble at 150/5 off 32 overs. Revised target of 157 off 46 overs.

26 February
(Scorecard)

Jersey; 192 all out (48.1 overs)	v	Singapore; 195/3 (26 overs)
Matt Hague 52 (97); Buddhika Mendis 3/18 (5 overs)		Buddhika Mendis 85* (77); Ben Stevens 3/57 (9 overs)

Singapore by 7 wickets
Birendra Sainik Maha Vidyalaya Ground, Bhaktapur
Umpires: Neil Harrison (JAP) & Batumalai Ramani (MAL)
Player of the match: Buddhika Mendis

26 February
(Scorecard)

Fiji; 181 all out (39.3 overs)	v	Bahrain; 276/9 (50 overs)
Tahir Dar 54 (30); Taniela Waqaituinayau 4/74 (10 overs)		Sakaraia Lomani 40 (34); Tahir Dar 4/19 (8.3 overs)

Bahrain won by 95 runs
Engineering Campus Ground, Lalitpur
Umpires: Farid Malik (UAE) & Ashwani Rana (Thailand)
Player of the match: Tahir Dar (Bahrain)

== Play-offs ==
27 February
(Scorecard)

Fiji; 258/7 (50 overs)	v	Jersey; 260/5 (49.1 overs)
Iniasi Cakacaka 78 (81); Ryan Driver 4/58 (10 overs)		Ryan Driver 78 (104); Viliame Yabaki 2/40 (8.1 overs)

Jersey won by 5 wickets
Engineering Campus Ground, Lalitpur
Umpires: Buddhi Pradhan & Batumalai Ramani
Player of the match: Ryan Driver (Jersey)

- 5th Place Playoff

27 February
(Scorecard)

Singapore; 126 all out (43 overs)	v	Bahrain; 127/7 (35.1 overs)
Monish Arora 29 (59); Tahir Dar 4/29 (7 overs)		Imran Sajjad 34 (40); Mirzan Faizal 2/23 (5 overs)

Bahrain won by 3 wickets
Birendra Sainik Maha Vidyalaya Ground, Bhaktapur
Umpires: Farid Malik & Ashwani Rana
Player of the match: Tahir Dar (Bahrain)

- 3rd Place Playoff

27 February
(Scorecard)

United States; 172 all out (47.2 overs)	v	Nepal; 175/5 (46.4 overs)
Steve Massiah 55 (114); Rahul Vishwakarma 7/15 (8.2 overs)		Anil Mandal 37 (66); Lennox Cush 2/27 (10 overs)

Nepal won by 5 wickets
Tribhuvan University International Cricket Ground, Kirtipur
Umpires: Sarika Prasad & Tyron Wijewardene
Player of the match: Rahul Vishwakarma (Nepal)

- Final

== Statistics ==
Most runs		Most wickets	
(United States) Steve Massiah	289	(United States) Kevin Darlington	14
(Jersey) Dean Morrison	251	(Bahrain) Qamar Saeed	13
(Nepal) Paras Khadka	250	(Nepal) Rahul Vishwakarma	12
(Singapore) Monish Arora	233	(Nepal) Basanta Regmi	12
(Jersey) Ryan Driver	232	(United States) Lennox Cush	12

== Post-tournament ==
After the conclusion of the tournament the teams were distributed as follows:

- Nepal & United States: Promoted to 2010 Division Four
- Bahrain& Singapore: Remain in 2012 Division Five
- Jersey & Fiji: Relegated to 2011 Division Six

The match between the US and Nepal on 26 February was under investigation by the ICC for the crowd trouble and the calculations of the net-run rate which denied Singapore promotion to Division 4. On 9 May, the ICC released a report, which upheld the umpires decisions during the match and retained the outcome of the tournament.

== TV coverage ==
The tournament was covered live on Nepal Television's second channel NTV2 or NTV Metro. This was the first time that any World Cricket League tournament was being broadcast live on TV. Only the games at Tribhuvan University ground were broadcast live.
