= 2006 ICC Americas Championship Division One =

- Administrator: Americas Cricket Association
- Cricket format: 50 overs per side (all matches except 🇨🇦 vs 🇧🇲 which is a full ODI match)
- Tournament format: round robin
- Host: Canada
- Champions: Bermuda (1st title)
- Participants: 5
- Matches: 10
- Most runs: (United States) Steve Massiah 283
- Most wickets: (Cayman Islands) Ronald Ebanks 10

The 2006 ICC Americas Championship was a cricket tournament in Canada, taking place between 21 and 26 August 2006. It gave five North and South American Associate and Affiliate members of the International Cricket Council experience of international one-day cricket.

This was the first edition of the Americas Championship in which the tournament was split up into divisions.

== Teams ==
There were 5 teams that played in the tournament. These teams were non-test member nations of the Americas Cricket Association. The teams that played were:

- Argentina
- Bermuda
- Canada
- Cayman Islands
- United States

== Squads ==
Argentina	Bermuda	Canada
Gaston Arizaga Alejandro Ferguson; Pablo Ferguson; Donald Forrester; Charles Gibson; Bernardo Irigoyen; Diego Lord; Esteban MacDermott; Estaban Nino; Lucas Paterlini; Matias Paterlini; Hernan Pereyra; Pablo Ryan; Gary Savage	Lionel Cann; Hasan Durham; Kevin Hurdle; Malachi Jones; Stefan Kelly; Dwayne Leverock; Saleem Mukuddem; George O'Brien; Steven Outerbridge; Azeem Pitcher; Irving Romaine; Clay Smith; Janeiro Tucker; Kwame Tucker	Ashish Bagai Trevin Bastiampillai; Ian Billcliff; Austin Codrington; George Codrington; John Davison; Sandeep Jyoti; Kendon Ottley; Abdool Samad; Kevin Sandher; Surendra Seeraj; Easan Sinnathamby; Durand Soraine; Steven Welsh

Cayman Islands	United States
Pearson Best Ryan Bovell; Ronald Ebanks; Ryan Ebanks; Steve Gordon; Franklyn Hinds; Abali Hoilett; Keneil Irving; Jalon Linton; Saheed Mohamed; Troy Taylor; Michael Wight; Philip Wight	Lennox Cush; Jignesh Desai; Imran Awan; Khawaja Shuja; Steve Massiah; Sushil Nadkarni; Chintan Patel; Abhishek Pawar; Steve Pitter; Gowkaran Roopnarine; Niraj Shah; Carl Wright

== Group stage ==
=== Points Table ===
Pool 1
Team	P	W	L	T	NR	NRR	Points
Bermuda	4	3	0	0	1	+1.420	14
United States	4	2	1	0	1	+0.485	10
Canada	4	2	2	0	0	+1.056	8
Cayman Islands	4	2	2	0	0	-0.257	8
Argentina	4	0	4	0	0	-2.469	0

=== Group stage ===
21 August
Scorecard

Bermuda; 272/7 (50 overs)	v	Canada; 261 (49.1 overs)
Irving Romaine 101 (111); Austin Codrington 3/31 (9 overs)		Ian Billcliff 59 (60); Hasan Durham 4/45 (9.1 overs)

Bermuda won by 11 runs
Toronto Cricket, Skating and Curling Club, Toronto
Umpires: Roger Dill (BER) & Ian Gould (ENG)
Player of the match: Irving Romaine

- Bermuda won the toss and elected to bat.
- Full ODI match.

21 August
Scorecard

United States; 300/2 (50 overs)	v	Cayman Islands; 194 (42.1 overs)
Steve Massiah 136* (140); Sushil Nadkarni 111 (132); Troy Taylor 1/41 (7 overs)		Ryan Bovell 34 (52); Imran Awan 3/47 (8 overs)

United States won by 106 runs
Maple Leaf Cricket Club North-West Ground, King City, Ontario
Umpires: Ashook Brijcoomar (CAN) & Ken Patel (CAN)
Player of the match: Steve Massiah

- Cayman Islands won the toss and elected to field.

22 August
Scorecard

Bermuda; 371/3 (50 overs)	v	Argentina; 262/5 (50 overs)
Lionel Cann 139* (68); Kwame Tucker 100* (135); Hernan Pereyra 1/58 (10 overs)		Lucas Paterlini 70 (61); Janeiro Tucker 2/46 (8 overs)

Bermuda won by 109 runs
Maple Leaf Cricket Club North-West Ground, King City, Ontario
Umpires: Ashook Brijcoomar (CAN) & Courtney Young (CAY)
Player of the match: Lionel Cann

- Bermuda won the toss and elected to bat.

22 August
Scorecard

Canada; 187 (43.3 overs)	v	Cayman Islands; 188/2 (42.2 overs)
George Codrington 73* (103); Troy Taylor 4/19 (8.3 overs)		Steve Gordon 70* (114); Steven Welsh 1/31 (10 overs)

Cayman Islands won by 8 wickets
Maple Leaf Cricket Club South-West Ground, King City, Ontario
Umpires: Randy Butler & George Francis (both BER)
Player of the match: Steve Gordon

- Cayman Islands won the toss and elected to field.

23 August
Scorecard

Argentina; 182 (49 overs)	v	United States; 186/3 (27.2 overs)
Alejandro Ferguson 57 (83); Imran Awan 3/51 (9 overs)		Lennox Cush 73* (42); Estaban Nino 1/34 (8 overs)

United States won by 7 wickets
Maple Leaf Cricket Club South-West Ground, King City, Ontario
Umpires: Roger Dill (BER) & Hubert Smythe (CAY)
Player of the match: Lennox Cush

- United States won the toss and elected to field.

23 August
Scorecard

Bermuda; 264/9 (50 overs)	v	Cayman Islands; 171 (42.2 overs)
Steven Outerbridge 96 (122); Saheed Mohamed 3/46 (10 overs)		Pearson Best 55 (88); Irving Romaine 3/16 (5.2 overs)

Bermuda won by 93 runs
Maple Leaf Cricket Club North-West Ground, King City, Ontario
Umpires: Karran Bayney (CAN) & Ken Patel (CAN)
Player of the match: Steven Outerbridge

- Bermuda won the toss and elected to bat.

25 August
Scorecard

United States; 213/4 (34.2 overs)	v	Bermuda; 12/2 (2.2 overs)
Sushil Nadkarni 83 (101); George O'Brien 2/54 (8 overs)		Steven Outerbridge 4 (2); Steve Pitter 1/5 (1 over)

No result
Maple Leaf Cricket Club South-West Ground, King City, Ontario
Umpires: Ashook Brijcoomar (CAN) & Courtney Young (CAY)

- Bermuda won the toss and elected to field.
- Rain reduced United States' innings to 34.2 overs. Bermuda's revised target was 162 runs off 20 overs

25 August
Scorecard

Argentina; 182/2 (50 overs)	v	Canada; 140/1 (21.3 overs)
Alejandro Ferguson 49* (55); Steven Welsh 2/16 (10 overs)		John Davison 53 (34); Diego Lord 1/36 (6 overs)

Canada won by 9 wickets (D/L)
Maple Leaf Cricket Club North-West Ground, King City, Ontario
Umpires: Roger Dill & George Francis (both BER)
Player of the match: John Davison

- Canada won the toss and elected to field.
- Rain reduced Canada's innings to 33 overs. Revised target was 137 runs off 33 overs.

26 August
Scorecard

Cayman Islands; 265/7 (50 overs)	v	Argentina; 151 (39.4 overs)
Pearson Best 116* (118); Matias Paterlini 3/41 (10 overs)		Gary Savage 44 (102); Ronald Ebanks 5/47 (9.4 overs)

Cayman Islands won by 114 runs
Maple Leaf Cricket Club South-West Ground, King City, Ontario
Umpires: Karran Bayney (CAN) & Randy Butler (BER)
Player of the match: Pearson Best

- Argentina won the toss and elected to field.

26 August
Scorecard

United States; 116 (32.4 overs)	v	Canada; 119/0 (16.4 overs)
Carl Wright 31 (51); John Davison 3/22 (8 overs)		John Davison 58* (55); Steve Massiah 0/7 (1 over)

Canada won by 10 wickets
Maple Leaf Cricket Club North-West Ground, King City, Ontario
Umpires: Hubert Smythe & Courtney Young (CAY)
Player of the match: John Davison

- Canada won the toss and elected to field.

== Statistics ==
Most Runs		Most Wickets	
(United States) Steve Massiah	283	(Cayman Islands) Ronald Ebanks	10
(Cayman Islands) Pearson Best	244	(Cayman Islands) Troy Taylor	9
(United States) Sushil Nadkarni	211	(United States) Imran Awan	7
(Argentina) Donald Forrester	149	(Canada) Steven Welsh	5
(Cayman Islands) Steve Gordon	149	6 others with	4
