= Dutch cricket team in Canada in 2007 =

	The Netherlands	Canada
- Dates: June 28 – July 4, 2007
Captains	Jeroen Smits	Ashish Bagai

One Day International series
- Results: The Netherlands won the 2-match series 1–0
Most runs	Peter Borren (96); Eric Szwarczynski (51); Darron Reekers (44)	Sunil Dhaniram (55); Steven Welsh (32); Henry Osinde (21)
Most wickets	Sunil Dhaniram (2); Henry Osinde (2); Kevin Sandher (2)	Edgar Schiferli (3); Mudassar Bukhari (3); Billy Stelling (2)

The Dutch cricket team toured Canada during the 2007 season. Two One Day Internationals were played, preceded by a First-class match, which was a part of the 2007-08 ICC Intercontinental Cup. The Dutch team won the First-class match by 45 runs, and won the ODI series 1-0: winning the first match by 117 runs, with the second being rained off.

== Squad lists ==
Canada ODI squad Ashish Bagai (c/wk) Geoff Barnett Trevin Bastiampillai Sunil Dhaniram Ashif Mulla Mohsin Mulla Henry Osinde Ashish Patel Qaiser Ali Kevin Sandher Shahzad Khan Durand Soraine Steven Welsh	Canada FC squad Ashish Bagai (c) Geoff Barnett Trevin Bastiampillai Umar Bhatti Sunil Dhaniram Ashif Mulla (wk) Henry Osinde Ashish Patel Qaiser Ali Abdool Samad Kevin Sandher Shahzad Afzal Shahzad Khan Steven Welsh	Netherlands squad Jeroen Smits (c/wk) Adeel Raja Peter Borren Mudassar Bukhari Atse Buurman Tom de Grooth Mark Jonkman Alexei Kervezee Mohammad Kashif Mangesh Panchal Darron Reekers Edgar Schiferli Billy Stelling Eric Szwarczynski

The Netherlands elected for the same squad for both the ODI and First-class matches.

== Intercontinental Cup match ==
June 28 - July 1
(Scorecard)

Netherlands	v	Canada
297 (78.3 overs); Alexei Kervezee 98 (142); Mudassar Bukhari 66* (71); Henry Osinde 17-6-47-4; Umar Bhatti 23-6-64-3		337/9d (93.4 overs); Sunil Dhaniram 73 (87); Henry Osinde 60* (79); Kevin Sandher 57 (142); Shahzad Khan 55 (114); Mudassar Bukhari 26-4-98-1
310 (93.2 overs); Peter Borren 105 (176); Henry Osinde 28-10-68-3; Kevin Sandher 23.2-7-78-3		225 (70 overs); Qaiser Ali 53 (103); Mangesh Panchal 11-0-50-4

Netherlands won by 45 runs
Maple Leaf Cricket Club, King City
Umpires: Roger Dill and Darrell Hair
Player of the match: Peter Borren

Shahzad Khan, Mudassar Bukhari, Atse Buurman and Mangesh Panchal made their First-class debuts in this match. Peter Borren and Alexei Kervezee recorded career best First-class high scores.

== ODI series ==
=== 1st ODI ===
July 3
(scorecard)

Netherlands; 289/7 (50 overs)	v	Canada; 172 (43 overs)
Peter Borren 96 (69); Eric Szwarczynski 51 (61); Sunil Dhaniram 2/39 (10 overs)		Sunil Dhaniram 55 (55); Edgar Schiferli 8-0-18-3; Mudassar Bukhari 8-1-24-3

Netherlands won by 117 runs
Toronto Cricket, Skating and Curling Club, Toronto
Umpires: Roger Dill and Darrell Hair
Player of the match: Peter Borren

Trevin Bastiampillai, Mohsin Mulla, Shahzad Khan, Mudassar Bukhari and Atse Buurman made their ODI debuts in this match. Peter Borren's score of 96 is his highest in ODI and List A cricket, whilst Edgar Schiferli recorded career best ODI figures of 3/18.

=== 2nd ODI ===
July 4
(scorecard)

Canada	v	Netherlands

No result
Toronto Cricket, Skating and Curling Club, Toronto
Umpires: Roger Dill and Darrell Hair

- Match abandoned without a ball bowled due to rain.
