= Bermudian cricket team in Canada in 2006 =

	Bermuda	Canada
- Dates: 12 August 2006 – 25 August 2006
Captains	Irving Romaine	John Davison

One Day International series
- Results: Bermuda won the 2-match series 2–0
Most runs	Irving Romaine 101	Abdool Samad 63
Most wickets	George O'Brien (cricketer) 6	George Codrington 4

The Bermudian cricket team toured Canada between 12 and 25 August 2006. The two teams played a Group B match in the 2006–07 ICC Intercontinental Cup and 2 One-day Internationals. The second one-day international formed part of the 2006 ICC Americas Championship Division One which also included Argentina, Cayman Islands and United States.

This was originally scheduled to be a triangular series between Bermuda, Canada and Kenya. However, after Kenya rescheduled their ODIs with Bangladesh due to their lack of financial backing, they also cancelled their matches against Bermuda.

== ICC Inter-Continental Cup 2006–07 ==
12–15 August 2006
Scorecard

Bermuda	v	Canada
334 (96.4 overs); Janeiro Tucker 71 (121); Umar Bhatti 4/91 (28 overs)		588 (135.4 overs); John Davison 165 (175); Ryan Steede 4/127 (24 overs)
310 (102.5 overs); Clay Smith 84 (225); Umar Bhatti 6/104 (28.5 overs)		60/1 (12.2 overs); Geoff Barnett 33* (35); Saleem Mukuddem 1/29 (6 overs)

Canada won by 9 wickets
Maple Leaf North-West Ground, King City, Ontario
Umpires: Norman Malcolm (WI) and Hubert Smythe (Cayman Islands)
Player of the match: Umar Bhatti (Can)

- Canada won the toss and elected to field.
- Points: Canada 20, Bermuda 0.

== One Day Internationals (ODIs) ==
Bermuda won the series 2–0.

=== 1st ODI ===
19 August 2006
Scorecard

Canada; 145 (39.5 overs)	v	Bermuda; 150/4 (40 overs)
AM Samad 28 (36); Extras 28; KAD Hurdle 3/24 (8.5 overs)		S Mukuddem 39 (71); AM Samad 1/8 (4 overs)

Bermuda won by 6 wickets
Toronto Cricket, Skating and Curling Club Ground, Toronto
Umpires: R Dill (BER) and IJ Gould (ENG)

- Canada won the toss and elected to bat.
- SD Outerbridge, DCC Borden and CJ Smith (all BER) made their ODI debuts

=== 2nd ODI ===
21 August 2006
Scorecard

Bermuda; 272/7 (50 overs)	v	Canada; 261 (49.1 overs)
IJ Romaine 101 (111); A Codrington 3/31 (9 overs)		IS Billcliff 59 (60); H Durham 4/45 (9.1 overs)

Bermuda won by 11 runs
Toronto Cricket, Skating and Curling Club Ground, Toronto
Umpires: R Dill (BER) and IJ Gould (ENG)
Player of the match: IJ Romaine (BER)

- Bermuda won the toss and elected to bat.
- S Jyoti, D Soraine, SR Welsh and S Seeraj (all CAN) made their ODI debuts
- This one-day international formed part of the 2006 ICC Americas Championship Division One
