= 2011 ACC Twenty20 Cup =

- Administrator: Asian Cricket Council
- Cricket format: Twenty20
- Tournament format: Group Stage with Finals
- Host: Nepal
- Champions: Afghanistan (3rd title)
- Participants: 10
- Matches: 27
- Player of the series: Munir Dar (Hong Kong)
- Most runs: 222 Moosa Kaleem (Maldives)
- Most wickets: 13 Mohammad Nabi (Afghanistan)
- Official website: Tournament Site

The 2011 ACC Twenty20 Cup was played between 3–11 December 2011 in Nepal. The tournament acted as a qualifying tournament for the 2012 ICC World Twenty20 Qualifier. The tournament was won by defending champions Afghanistan who defeated Hong Kong in the final to win the tournament for a third time. Afghanistan had already qualified for the World Twenty20 Qualifier as an Associate Member of the International Cricket Council with One Day International status. They will be joined in the qualifying event by Hong Kong, Oman and Nepal.

== Squads ==
Afghanistan	Bhutan	Hong Kong	Kuwait	Malaysia
Nawroz Mangal (c); Asghar Afghan; Dawlat Zadran; Gulbudeen Naib; Hamid Hassan; Karim Sadiq (wk); Mirwais Ashraf; Mohammad Nabi; Mohammad Shahzad (wk); Najibullah Zadran; Nasim Khan; Samiullah Shenwari; Shabir Noori; Zamir Khan	Tshering Dorji (c) & (wk); Dampo Dorji; Thinley Jamtsho; Kumar Subba; Dorji Loday; Bikash Luitel; Kencho Norbu (wk); Suprit Pradhan; Sonam Tobgay; Tashi Tshering; Ugyen Dorji; Barun Wakhley; Tandin Wangchuk; Phuntsho Wangdi	Jamie Atkinson (c) & (wk); Aizaz Khan; Asif Khan; Daljeet Singh; Mark Ferguson; Babar Hayat; Irfan Ahmed; Courtney Kruger; Roy Lamsam; Munir Dar; Nadeem Ahmed; Nizakat Khan; Kinchit Shah; Waqas Barkat (wk)	Azmatullah Nazeer (c); Abdullah Akhunzada; Adnan Idrees; Ali Zaheer; Yohan Gedara; Haroon Shahid; Mohamed Rifkas; Mohammad Murad; Mohammed Asghar; Mohammed Irfan; Nabeel Ahmed (wk); Jagath Roshantha (wk); Saud Qamar; Yasar Idrees	Suhan Kumar (c) & (wk); Shukri Abdul Rahim; Abdul Rashid; Hassan Ghulam; Suresh Navaratnam; Nazril Rahman; Nik Arifin; Norwira Zazmie; Ariffin Ramly; Rosman Zakaria (wk); Shahrulnizam Yusof; Muthuraman Sockalingam; Suharril Fetri; Hammad Ullah Khan

Maldives	Nepal	Oman	Saudi Arabia	United Arab Emirates
Moosa Kaleem (c); Abdullah Shahid; Afzal Faiz; Ahmed Jamaal; Mihusan Hamid; Hassan Ibrahim (wk); H Haziq (wk); Husham Ibrahim; Ismail Hameed; Mohotte Jayakody; Jilwaz Rasheed; Mohamed Mahfooz; Neesham Nasir; Shafraz Jaleel	Paras Khadka (c); Pradeep Airee; Mehboob Alam; Prithu Baskota; Binod Bhandari (wk); Amrit Bhattarai; Binod Das; Subash Khakurel (wk); Gyanendra Malla; Anil Mandal; Basanta Regmi; Sanjam Regmi; Sharad Vesawkar; Rahul Vishwakarma	Hemal Mehta (c); Aamir Khaleem; Qais Al Said; Aamer Ali; Arfan Ali; Awal Khan; Ghazanfar Iqbal; Jatinder Singh; Ajay Lalcheta; Rajeshkumar Ranpura; Sultan Ahmed (wk); Vaibhav Wategaonkar; Yousuf Mahmood; Zeeshan Siddiqui	Kashif Shafiq (c); Babar Hussain (wk); Faheem Afrad; Hammad Saeed; Hassan Malik; Irfan Farooqi; Kashif Meher; Khawar Sohail; Mohammad Abdullah; Mohammad Naseem; Mohammad Zaheer; Rizwan Qayyum; Shoaib Ali; Waqas Akram	Khurram Khan (c); Abdul Rehman (wk); Ahmed Raza; Amjad Ali (wk); Amjad Javed; Faizan Asif; Irfan Ahmed; Rohan Mustafa; Nasir Aziz; Bakthiyar Palekar; Shaiman Anwar; Vikrant Shetty; Shoaib Sarwar; Shadeep Silva

== Group stage ==
=== Group A ===
Team	M	W	L	Pts	NRR
Afghanistan	4	4	0	8	+4.263
Oman	4	3	1	6	+1.750
Malaysia	4	2	2	4	+0.875
Maldives	4	1	3	2	-1.140
Bhutan	4	0	4	0	-6.135

=== Results ===
3 December 2011
09:30 NPT
(Scorecard)

Afghanistan; 166/4 (20 overs)	v	Malaysia; 107/9 (20 overs)
Shabir Noori 53 (30); Nik Arifin 3/35 (4 overs)		Hammad Ullah Khan 31 (26); Mohammad Nabi 3/21 (4 overs)

Afghanistan won by 59 runs
Engineering Campus Ground, Lalitpur
Umpires: Himal Giri (Nepal) and Vinay Kumar (Nepal)

- Afghanistan won the toss & elected to bat

3 December 2011
13:00 NPT
Scorecard

Oman; 186/7 (20 overs)	v	Bhutan; 62 (13.4 overs)
Vaibhav Wategaonkar 45 (34); Sonam Tobgay 3/38 (4 overs)		Kumar Subba 13 (20); Hemal Mehta 3/11 (2 overs)

Oman won by 124 runs
Engineering Campus Ground, Lalitpur
Umpires: Sanjay Gurung (Nepal) and Basu Karn (Nepal)
Player of the match: Zeeshan Siddiqui (Oman)

- Oman won the toss & elected to bat

4 December 2011
09:30 NPT
Scorecard

Bhutan; 77(18 overs)	v	Maldives; 78/1 (12.1 overs)
Tshering Dorji 13 (21); Moosa Kaleem 3/11 (4 overs)		Moosa Kaleem 48* (41); Thinley Jamtsho 1/18 (2 overs)

Maldives won by 9 wickets.
Engineering Campus Ground, Lalitpur
Umpires: Basu Karn (Nepal) and Durga Subedi (Nepal)
Player of the match: Moosa Kaleem (Maldives)

- Maldives won the toss & elected to field

4 December 2011
09:30 NPT
Scorecard

Afghanistan; 117 (19.3 overs)	v	Oman; 77 (19.4 overs)
Mohammad Shahzad 24 (21); Ajay Lalcheta 4/13 (3.3 overs)		Aamer Ali 19 (20); Hamid Hassan 2/7 (4 overs)

Afghanistan won by 40 runs
Tribhuvan University International Cricket Ground, Kirtipur
Umpires: Vinay Kumar (Nepal) and Shailendra Nepal (Nepal)
Player of the match: Hamid Hassan (Afghanistan)

- Oman won the toss & elected to field

5 December 2011
09:30 NPT
Scorecard

Malaysia; 147/8 (20 overs)	v	Maldives; 128/7 (20 overs)
Hammad Ullah Khan 54 (56); Moosa Kaleem 3/23 (4 overs)		Moosa Kaleem 47 (43); Shahrulnizam Yusof 2/18 (3 overs)

Malaysia won by 19 runs
Tribhuvan University International Cricket Ground, Kirtipur
Umpires: Buddhi Pradhan (Nepal) and Sanjay Sarda (Thailand)
Player of the match: Hammad Ullah Khan (Malaysia)

- Maldives won the toss & elected to field

6 December 2011
09:30 NPT
Scorecard

Malaysia; 149/9 (20 overs)	v	Oman; 151/7 (20 overs)
Hammad Ullah Khan 47 (43); Aamir Khaleem 3/18 (4 overs)		Ghazanfar Iqbal 33 (28); Shahrulnizam Yusof 2/17 (3 overs)

Oman won by 3 wickets
Engineering Campus Ground, Lalitpur
Umpires: Manjul Bhattarai (Nepal) and Buddhi Pradhan (Nepal)
Player of the match: Aamir Khaleem (Oman)

- Malaysia won the toss & elected to bat

6 December 2011
13:00 NPT
Scorecard

Afghanistan; 225/6 (20 overs)	v	Bhutan; 45 (17.4 overs)
Karim Sadiq 72 (42); Phuntsho Wangdi 3/43 (4 overs)		Tashi Tshering 16 (38); Zamir Khan 2/4 (3.4 overs)

Afghanistan won by 180 runs
Engineering Campus Ground, Lalitpur
Umpires: Manohar Adhikari (Nepal) and Adhip Pradhan (Nepal)
Player of the match: Karim Sadiq (Afghanistan)

- Bhutan won the toss & elected to field

7 December 2011
09:30 NPT
Scorecard

Afghanistan; 157/8 (20 overs)	v	Maldives; 95 (20 overs (18.2 overs)
Shabir Noori 76 (50); Ahmed Faiz 3/23 (3 overs)		Moosa Kaleem 45 (35); Mohammad Nabi 4/10 (4 overs)

Afghanistan won by 62 runs
Engineering Campus Ground, Lalitpur
Umpires: Vinay Kumar (Nepal) and Ram Yadav (Nepal)
Player of the match: Shabir Noori (Afghanistan)

- Maldives won the toss & elected to field

7 December 2011
13:00 NPT
Scorecard

Bhutan; 79 (19.2 overs)	v	Malaysia; 191/6 (20 overs)
Kumar Subba 18 (28); Norwira Zazmie 3/14 (4 overs)		Hammad Ullah Khan 51 (28); Sonam Tobgay 2/41 (4 overs)

Malaysia won by 112 runs
Engineering Campus Ground, Lalitpur
Umpires: Buddhi Pradhan (Nepal) and Raman Shiwakoti (Nepal)
Player of the match: Hammad Ullah Khan (Malaysia)

- Malaysia won the toss & elected to bat

8 December 2011
09:30 NPT
Scorecard

Maldives; 93/4 (20 overs)	v	Oman; 147/6 (20 overs)
Moosa Kaleem 55* (59); Ajay Lalcheta 2/18 (3 overs)		Aamer Ali 47* (32); Mohamed Mahfooz 3/23 (4 overs)

Oman won by 54 runs
Engineering Campus Ground, Lalitpur
Umpires: Vinay Kumar (Nepal) and Raman Shiwakoti (Nepal)
Player of the match: Amir Ali (Oman)

- Maldives won the toss & elected to field

=== Group B ===
Team	M	W	L	Pts	NRR
Hong Kong	4	3	1	6	+1.228
Nepal	4	3	1	6	+1.061
United Arab Emirates	4	3	1	6	+0.832
Kuwait	4	1	3	2	-0.054
Saudi Arabia	4	0	4	0	-3.075

=== Results ===
3 December 2011
09:30 NPT
Scorecard

Nepal; 115/8 (20 overs)	v	Hong Kong; 114/9 (20 overs)
Paras Khadka 44 (46); Irfan Ahmed 3/25 (4 overs)		Irfan Ahmed 25 (11); Basanta Regmi 2/14 (4 overs)

Nepal won by 2 wickets
Tribhuvan University International Cricket Ground, Kirtipur
Umpires: Ashwani Rana (Thailand) and Sanjay Sarda (Thailand)
Player of the match: Paras Khadka (Nepal)

- Hong Kong won the toss & elected to bat

3 December 2011
13:00 NPT
Scorecard

Kuwait; 135 all out (19.5 overs)	v	United Arab Emirates; 138/6 (18.4 overs)
Mohammad Murad 34 (23); Khurram Khan 3/11 (3.5 overs)		Vikrant Shetty 45* (32); Mohammad Murad 3/31 (3.4 overs)

United Arab Emirates won by 4 wickets
Tribhuvan University International Cricket Ground, Kirtipur
Umpires: Shailendra Nepal (Nepal) and Buddhi Pradhan (Nepal)
Player of the match: Vikrant Shetty (UAE)

- Kuwait won the toss & elected to bat

4 December 2011
09:30 NPT
Scorecard

Kuwait; 97/4 (13.3 overs)	v	Saudi Arabia; 96 all out (19.2 overs)
Yasar Idrees 37 (22); Khawar Sohail 2/31 (4 overs)		Rizwan Qayyum 29* (32); Mohammed Asghar 3/8 (3.2 overs)

Kuwait won by 6 wickets
Engineering Campus Ground, Lalitpur
Umpires: Buddhi Pradhan (Nepal) and Ram Yadav (Nepal)
Player of the match: Mohammed Asghar (Kuwait)

- Saudi Arabia won the toss & elected to bat

4 December 2011
09:30 NPT
Scorecard

Nepal; 95/9 (20 overs)	v	United Arab Emirates; 99/4 (18.3 overs)
Mehboob Alam 17 (12); Ahmed Raza 3/12 (4 overs)		Shaiman Anwar 33 (33); Amrit Bhattarai 3/25 (4 overs)

United Arab Emirates won by 6 wickets
Tribhuvan University International Cricket Ground, Kirtipur
Umpires: Ashwani Rana (Thailand) and Sanjay Sarda (Thailand)
Player of the match: Ahmed Raza (UAE)

- Nepal won the toss & elected to bat

5 December 2011
09:30 NPT
Scorecard

Hong Kong; 151/6 (20 overs)	v	Saudi Arabia; 107 all out (19.4 overs)
Munir Dar 54* (28); Khawar Sohail 1/18 (4 overs)		Kashif Shafiq 70 (46); Aizaz Khan 2/17 (3 overs)

Hong Kong won by 44 runs
Engineering Campus Ground, Lalitpur
Umpires: Manohar Adhikari (Nepal) and Manjul Bhattarai (Nepal)
Player of the match: Munir Dar (Hong King)

- Hong Kong won the toss & elected to bat

6 December 2011
09:30 NPT
Scorecard

Nepal; 126/6 (20 overs)	v	Kuwait; 125 all out (19.5 overs)
Subash Khakurel 40 (32); Mohammed Asghar 2/17 (4 overs)		Saud Qamar 39 (42); Prithu Baskota 3/17 (1.5 overs)

Nepal won by 1 run
Tribhuvan University International Cricket Ground, Kirtipur
Umpires: Ashwani Rana (Thailand) and Sanjay Sarda (Thailand)
Player of the match: Prithu Baskota (Nepal)

- Kuwait won the toss & elected to field

6 December 2011
13:00 NPT
Scorecard

Hong Kong; 145/6 (18 overs)	v	United Arab Emirates; 144/4 (20 overs)
Irfan Ahmed 70 (42); Munir Dar 1/19 (4 overs)		Amjad Ali 79* (65); Ahmed Raza 3/20 (4 overs)

Hong Kong won by 4 wickets
Tribhuvan University International Cricket Ground, Kirtipur
Umpires: Himal Giri (Nepal) and Vinay Kumar (Nepal)
Player of the match: Irfan Ahmed (Hong Kong)

- United Arab Emirates won the toss & elected to bat

7 December 2011
09:30 NPT
Scorecard

Nepal; 183/5 (20 overs)	v	Saudi Arabia; 88 all out (19.1 overs)
Mehboob Alam 88 (41); Khawar Sohail 4/27 (4 overs)		Mohammad Naseem 21 (20); Paras Khadka 3/5 (2.1 overs)

Nepal won by 95 runs
Tribhuvan University International Cricket Ground, Kirtipur
Umpires: Ashwani Rana (Thailand) and Sanjay Sarda(Thailand)
Player of the match: Mehboob Alam (Nepal)

- Saudi Arabia won the toss & elected to field

7 December 2011
13:00 NPT
Scorecard

Hong Kong; 131/4 (14.5 overs)	v	Kuwait; 130/9 (20 overs)
Jamie Atkinson 41* (29); Saud Qamar 1/19 (2 overs)		Mohammed Asghar 34 (22); Irfan Ahmed 2/13 (4 overs)

Hong Kong won by 6 wickets
Tribhuvan University International Cricket Ground, Kirtipur
Umpires: Sanjay Gurung (Nepal) and Buddhi Pradhan (Nepal)
Player of the match: Munir Dar (Hong Kong)

- Kuwait won the toss & elected to bat

8 December 2011
09:30 NPT
Scorecard

Saudi Arabia; 115 all out (19.2 overs)	v	United Arab Emirates; 168/8 (20 overs)
Hammad Saeed 63 (38); Khurram Khan 3/12 (4 overs)		Vikrant Shetty 63* (35); Rizwan Qayyum 4/28 (4 overs)

United Arab Emirates won by 53 runs
Tribhuvan University International Cricket Ground, Kirtipur
Umpires: Sanjay Gurung (Nepal) and Durga Subedi (Nepal)
Player of the match: Vikrant Shetty (UAE)

- Saudi Arabia won the toss & elected to field

== Semi-finals and Playoffs ==
=== 9th place playoff ===
10 December 2011
Scorecard

Bhutan; 120/9 (18 overs)	v	Saudi Arabia; 119/5 (18 overs)
Sonam Tobgay 27 (29); Barun Wakhley 3/22 (4 overs)		Rizwan Qayyum 34* (42); Hammad Saeed 3/13 (4 overs)

Bhutan won by 1 wicket
Engineering Campus Ground, Lalitpur
Umpires: Adhip Pradhan (Nepal) and Ram Yadav (Nepal)
Player of the match: Sonam Tobgay (Bhutan)

- Saudi Arabia won the toss and elected to bat
- Match start delayed due to fog

=== 7th place playoff ===
9 December 2011
Scorecard

Maldives; 117 (19.3 overs)	v	Kuwait; 199/5 (20 overs)
Moosa Kaleem 27 (29); Haroon Shahid 3/14 (4 overs)		Saud Qamar 58* (37); Mohamed Mahfooz 1/18 (4 Overs)

Kuwait won by 82 runs
Engineering Campus Ground, Lalitpur
Umpires: Sanjay Gurung (Nepal) and Shailendra Nepal (Nepal)
Player of the match: Mohammed Asghar (Kuwait)

- Kuwait won the toss and elected to bat

=== 5th place playoff ===
9 December 2011
Scorecard

Malaysia; 104 all out (19.1 overs)	v	United Arab Emirates; 106/1 (9.5 overs)
Suresh Navaratnam 56 (46); Khurram Khan 4/8 (4 Overs)		Amjad Ali 64* (35); Shukri Abdul Rahim 1/30 (3 Overs)

United Arab Emirates won by 9 wickets
Engineering Campus Ground, Lalitpur
Umpires: Himal Giri (Nepal) and Durga Subedi (Nepal)
Player of the match: Khurram Khan (UAE)

- Malaysia won the toss and chose to bat

=== Semi-finals ===
9 December 2011
9:15
Scorecard

Nepal; 68/9 (16 overs)	v	Afghanistan; 70/1 (9.2 overs)
Paras Khadka 30(29); Dawlat Zadran 4/13 (3 Overs)		Karim Sadiq 32(26); Basanta Regmi 1/12 (4 Overs)

Afghanistan won by 9 wickets
Tribhuvan University International Cricket Ground, Kirtipur
Umpires: Ashwani Rana (Thailand) and Sanjay Sarda (Thailand)
Player of the match: Dawlat Zadran (Afghanistan)

- Nepal won the toss and elected to bat
- Match start delayed due to fog

9 December 2011
12:45
Scorecard

Oman; 142/6 (20 overs)	v	Hong Kong; 146/7 (19.3 overs)
Vaibhav Wategaonkar 56* (46); Irfan Ahmed 3/20 (4 overs)		Munir Dar 76* (46); Hemal Mehta 2/16 (3.3 overs)

Hong Kong won by 3 wickets
Tribhuvan University International Cricket Ground, Kirtipur
Umpires: Vinay Kumar (Nepal) and Buddhi Pradhan (Nepal)
Player of the match: Munir Dar (Hong Kong)

- Oman won the toss and elected to bat

== 3rd place playoff and Final ==
=== 3rd place playoff ===
10 December 2011
Scorecard

Nepal; 99/9 (15 overs)	v	Oman; 101/8 (15 overs)
Pradeep Airee 20 (22); Aamir Khaleem 3/11 (3 overs)		Zeeshan Siddiqui 22 (12); Mehboob Alam 4/22 (3 overs)

Oman won by 2 runs
Tribhuvan University International Cricket Ground, Kirtipur
Umpires: Ashwani Rana (Thailand) and Sanjay Sarda (Thailand)
Player of the match: Aamir Khaleem (Omaan)

- Oman won the toss and elected to bat
- Match start delayed due to fog

=== Final ===
11 December 2011
Scorecard

Afghanistan; 125 (20 overs)	v	Hong Kong; 117 (20 overs)
Gulbudeen Naib 57 (50); Munir Dar 5/23 (3.5 overs)		Jamie Atkinson 35 (46); Hamid Hassan 3/12 (4 overs)

Afghanistan won by 8 runs
Tribhuvan University International Cricket Ground, Kirtipur
Umpires: Vinay Kumar (Nepal) and Buddhi Pradhan (Nepal)
Player of the match: Hamid Hassan (Afg)

- Afghanistan won the toss and elected to bat

== Final standings ==
Position	Team	Promotion/Relegation
1st	Afghanistan	Promoted to 2012 ICC World Twenty20 Qualifier
2nd	Hong Kong	Promoted to 2012 ICC World Twenty20 Qualifier
3rd	Oman	Promoted to 2012 ICC World Twenty20 Qualifier
4th	Nepal	Promoted to 2012 ICC World Twenty20 Qualifier
5th	United Arab Emirates	
6th	Malaysia	
7th	Kuwait	
8th	Maldives	
9th	Bhutan	
10th	Saudi Arabia	

== Statistics ==
=== Most runs ===
The top five highest run scorers (total runs) are included in this table.

Player	Team	Runs	Inns	Avg	S/R	HS	100s	50s	4s	6s
Moosa Kaleem	Maldives	222	5	74.00	107.24	55*	0	1	25	9
Munir Dar	Hong Kong	202	6	67.33	141.25	76*	0	2	17	11
Shabir Noori	Afghanistan	202	6	50.50	139.31	76	0	2	26	7
Karim Sadiq	Afghanistan	191	6	31.83	126.49	72	0	1	29	4
Hammad Ullah Khan	Malaysia	183	5	36.60	127.08	54	0	2	25	2

=== Most wickets ===
The following table contains the five leading wicket-takers.

Player	Team	Wkts	Mts	Ave	S/R	Econ	BBI
Mohammad Nabi	Afghanistan	13	6	7.15	9.8	4.35	4/10
Khurram Khan	United Arab Emirates	12	5	6.91	9.4	4.40	4/8
Ahmed Raza	United Arab Emirates	12	5	7.83	10.0	4.70	3/12
Khawar Sohail	Saudi Arabia	12	5	9.08	10.0	5.45	4/27
Irfan Ahmed	Hong Kong	12	6	11.66	11.5	6.08	3/20

== See also ==
- 2012 ICC World Twenty20 Qualifier
- ACC Trophy
