= Shahzad =

Shahzad (Persian: شَهزاد) or Shehzad is a given name and surname. The name is made from شاه (Shah, "king"), and زاد (Zad, "son of"), so the name means "son of the king". Notable persons with the name include:

== Given name ==
- Shehzad Afzal, Scottish film writer, director and producer
- Shahzad Ahmed (born 1978), Bahraini cricketer
- Shehzad Ahmed (cricketer) (born 1991), Danish cricketer
- Shehzad Ahmed (poet) (1932–2012), Pakistani poet
- Shahzad Altaf (born 1957), Pakistani cricketer
- Shahzad Anwar (born 1978), Pakistani professional association football manager
- Shehzad Arbab, Pakistani civil servant
- Shehzad Azam (1985–2022), Pakistani cricketer
- Shahzad Khan Bangash, Chief Secretary of Khyber Pakhtunkhwa
- Shahzad Bashir (cricketer), Pakistani cricketer
- Shahzad Bashir (scholar), Professor of Religious Studies
- Shehzad Butt (born 1974), Pakistani cricketer
- Shahzad Elahi (born 1965), Pakistani politician
- Shehzad Ata Elahi, Pakistani attorney general
- Shahzad Ismaily (born 1972), American bass guitarist
- Shahzad Kashmiri, Pakistani television and film director
- Shahzad Khalil (1944–1989), Pakistani television director and producer
- Shahzad Khan (born 1981), Canadian cricketer
- Shehzad Khan (born 1966), Indian actor
- Shazad Latif (born 1988), British actor
- Shahzad Malik, Pakistani businessman
- Shehzad Malik (born 1978), Pakistani cricketer
- Shahzad Munshi (born 1969), Pakistani politician
- Shahzad Nawaz (born 1953), Actor, singer, and film director
- Shahzad Noor (born 1989), Pakistani model and actor
- Shahzad Qureshi, Pakistani politician
- Shahzad Rafique, Pakistani film director
- Shahzad A. Rizvi (born 1937), American poet
- Shehzad Roy (born 1979), Pakistani musician, producer and social worker
- Shahzad Sheikh (born 1982), Pakistani television actor
- Shahzad Siddique (born 1987), Bahraini cricketer
- Shehzad Tanweer (1982–2005), British terrorist
- Shahzad Tareen (born 1988), Pakistani cricketer
- Shahzad Uddin, Bangladeshi-British accounting academic
- Shahzad Ukani (born 1985), Ugandan cricketer
- Shahzad Waseem, Pakistani politician

== Surname ==
- Adeel Shahzad, Pakistani politician
- Ahmad Shahzad (born 1991), Pakistani cricketer
- Ajmal Shahzad (born 1985), English cricket player/coach
- Anjum Shahzad, Pakistani director
- Faisal Shahzad (born 1979), American convicted terrorist
- Kamran Shazad (born 1980), Emirati cricketer
- Khurram Shahzad (weightlifter) (born 1981), Pakistani weightlifter
- Khurram Shahzad (Qatari cricketer) (born 1988), Qatari cricketer
- Khurram Shahzad (Pakistani cricketer, born 1999), Pakistani international cricketer
- Khurram Shahzad (Pakistani cricketer, born 1993), Pakistani cricketer
- Khurram Shazad (born 1990), Association football player
- Mahoor Shahzad (born 1996), Pakistani badminton player
- Mohammad Shahzad (born 1988), Afghan cricketer
- Mohammad Shahzad (Emirati cricketer) (born 1979), Emirati cricketer
- Muhammad Shahzad, Indian politician
- Navid Shahzad, Pakistani actress
- Omer Shahzad (born 1987), Pakistani model, actor and singer
- Rameez Shahzad (born 1987), Emirati cricketer
- Sadiq Ali Shahzad (1951–2016), Pakistani sculptor
- Saleem Shahzad (1970–2011), Pakistani investigative journalist
- Saleem Shahzad (politician) (1956–2018), Pakistani politician
- Zia Shahzad (born 1996), Pakistani cricketer

== See also ==
- Shahzade (disambiguation)
- Shah
- Şehzade
