= Shehzad Ahmed =

Shehzad Ahmed may refer to:

- Shehzad Ahmed (cricketer) (born 1991), Danish cricketer
- Shehzad Ahmed (poet) (1932–2012), Pakistani poet

== See also ==
- Shahzad Ahmed (born 1978), Bahraini cricketer
- Ahmed Shehzad (born 1991), Pakistani cricketer
