= 2010 World Twenty20 Qualifier =

2010 ICC World Twenty20 Qualifier
- Dates: 9 February – 13 February
- Administrator: International Cricket Council
- Cricket format: Twenty20 and Twenty20 International
- Tournament format(s): Group Stage, Super Four, Final
- Host: United Arab Emirates
- Champions: Afghanistan (1st title)
- Participants: 8
- Matches: 17
- Player of the series: (Ireland) Alex Cusack
- Most runs: (Ireland) Niall O'Brien (188)
- Most wickets: (Afghanistan) Mohammad Nabi (13)
- Official website: Cricinfo tournament page

The 2010 ICC World Twenty20 Qualifier was played from 9–13 February 2010 in the United Arab Emirates and a part of ICC World Twenty20 Qualifier series. The top two teams progressed to play in the 2010 ICC World Twenty20, the international championship of Twenty20 cricket.

The eight competing teams were: Afghanistan, Canada, Ireland, Kenya, the Netherlands, Scotland, UAE and the USA.

The groups were devised by virtue of seedings from the previous ICC World Twenty20 Qualifier, which was won jointly by Ireland and the Netherlands and, for the teams not participating in that event (Afghanistan, UAE and USA) on latest one-day rankings.

The tournament winners go into Group C of the ICC World Twenty20 2010 along with South Africa and India while the runners up will join West Indies and England in Group D. The tournament was won by Afghanistan who defeated Ireland by 8 wickets in the final. This was the first major tournament Afghanistan qualified for, while leading associates the Netherlands and Scotland failed to qualify this time.

== Squads ==
Afghanistan	Canada	Ireland	Kenya
Nowroz Mangal (captain); Aftab Alam; Asghar Afghan; Dawlat Ahmadzai; Hamid Hassan; Karim Sadiq; Mirwais Ashraf; Mohammad Nabi; Mohammad Shahzad (wicketkeeper); Noor Ali; Raees Ahmadzai; Samiullah Shenwari; Shafiqullah; Shapoor Zadran; Kabir Khan (coach)	Rizwan Cheema (captain); Arsalan Qadir; Ashish Bagai (wicketkeeper); Harvir Baidwan; Geoff Barnett; Umar Bhatti; Ian Billcliff; John Davison; Sunil Dhaniram; Sandeep Jyoti; Shaheed Keshvani; Khurram Chohan; Hiral Patel; Henry Osinde; Saad Bin Zafar; Abdool Samad; Usman Limbada; Pubudu Dassanayake (coach)	William Porterfield (captain); Andre Botha; Peter Connell; Alex Cusack; George Dockrell; Trent Johnston; Nigel Jones; Gary Kidd; John Mooney; Kevin O'Brien; Niall O'Brien (wicketkeeper); Paul Stirling; Andrew White; Gary Wilson; Phil Simmons (coach)	Morris Ouma (captain/wicketkeeper); Jimmy Kamande; Shem Obado; Alex Obanda; Collins Obuya; David Obuya; Nehemiah Odhiambo; Nelson Odhiambo; Lameck Onyango; Elijah Otieno; Rakep Patel; Tony Suji; Steve Tikolo; Hiren Varaiya; Eldine Baptiste (coach)

Netherlands	Scotland	United Arab Emirates	United States
Peter Borren (captain); Mudassar Bukhari; Atse Buurman (wicketkeeper); Tom de Grooth; Tim Gruijters; Mark Jonkman; Alexei Kervezee; Mohammad Kashif; Edgar Schiferli; Pieter Seelaar; Eric Szwarczynski; Ryan ten Doeschate; Daan van Bunge; Bas Zuiderent; Peter Drinnen (coach)	Gavin Hamilton (captain); Richie Berrington; Kyle Coetzer; Gordon Drummond; Gordon Goudie; Majid Haq; Ross Lyons; Neil McCallum; Dewald Nel; Navdeep Poonia; Simon Smith (wicketkeeper); Jan Stander; Ryan Watson; Peter Steindl (coach)	Khurram Khan (captain); Abdul Rehman (wicketkeeper); Ahmed Raza; Arfan Haider; Awais Alam; Fayyaz Ahmed; Mohammad Iqbal; Moiz Shahid; Naeemuddin Aslam; Qadar Nawaz; Qasim Zubair; Saqib Ali; Shoaib Sarwar; Shadeep Silva; Colin Wells (coach)	Steve Massiah (captain); Timroy Allen; Orlando Baker; Lennox Cush; Kevin Darlington; Sudesh Dhaniram; Glen Hall; Imran Awan; Rashard Marshall; Sushil Nadkarni; Aditya Thyagarajan; Usman Shuja; Saurabh Verma; Carl Wright (wicketkeeper); Clayton Lambert (coach)

== Group stage ==
=== Group A ===
Pos	Team	Pld	W	L	T	NR	Pts	NRR
1	Afghanistan	3	3	0	0	0	6	0.933
2	Ireland	3	2	1	0	0	4	1.700
3	United States	3	1	2	0	0	2	−1.684
4	Scotland	3	0	3	0	0	0	−0.958

9 February
Scorecard

Scotland; 120/7 (20 overs)	v	United States; 121/4 (19.1 overs)
Gavin Hamilton 41 (53); Kevin Darlington 2/19 (4 overs)		Carl Wright 62 (57); Ryan Watson 2/10 (2 overs)

United States won by 6 wickets.
Sheikh Zayed Stadium, Abu Dhabi
Umpires: Paul Baldwin (Eng) and Sarika Prasad (Sin)
Player of the match: Carl Wright (USA)

- Scotland won the toss and elected to bat.
- Sushil Nadkarni, Carl Wright, Timroy Allen, Steve Massiah, Sudesh Dhaniram, Orlando Baker, Saurabh Verma, Usman Shuja, Rashard Marshall and Kevin Darlington (USA) all made their T20 debuts.

9 February
Scorecard

Afghanistan; 139/8 (20 overs)	v	Ireland; 126 (19.2 overs)
Mohammad Nabi 43* (25); Trent Johnston 2/18 (4 overs)		William Porterfield 35 (23); Karim Sadiq 3/17 (3 overs)

Afghanistan won by 13 runs.
Dubai Sports City Cricket Stadium, Dubai
Umpires: Jeff Luck (Nam) and Subhash Modi (Ken)
Player of the match: Mohammad Nabi (Afg)

- Ireland won the toss and elected to field.

10 February
Scorecard

Afghanistan; 131/7 (20 overs)	v	Scotland; 117/9 (20 overs)
Noor Ali 42 (37); Kyle Coetzer 3/25 (4 overs)		Neil McCallum 38 (34); Hameed Hasan 3/32 (4 overs)

Afghanistan won by 14 runs.
Sheikh Zayed Stadium, Abu Dhabi
Umpires: Paul Baldwin (Ger) and Subhash Modi (Ken)
Player of the match: Noor Ali (Afg)

- Scotland won the toss and elected to field.

10 February
Scorecard

Ireland; 202/4 (20 overs)	v	United States; 124/6 (20 overs)
Niall O'Brien 84 (50 overs); Timroy Allen 2/29 (3 overs)		Aditya Thyagarajan 72* (67); Peter Connell 4/14 (4 overs)

Ireland won by 78 runs.
Sheikh Zayed Stadium, Abu Dhabi
Umpires: PK Baldwin (Ger) and SR Modi (Ken)
Player of the match: Niall O'Brien (Ire)

- Ireland won the toss and elected to bat.
- Aditya Thyagarajan (USA) made his T20 debut.

11 February
Scorecard

Afghanistan; 135/4 (20 overs)	v	United States; 106/7 (20 overs)
Nowroz Mangal 30 (27); Lennox Cush 1/18 (4 overs)		Carl Wright 28 (38); Hameed Hasan 3/14 (4 overs)

Afghanistan won by 29 runs.
Dubai Sports City Cricket Stadium, Dubai
Umpires: Paul Baldwin (Ger) and Subhash Modi (Ken)
Player of the match: Hamid Hassan (Afg)

- Afghanistan won the toss and elected to bat.
- Imran Awan (USA) made his T20 debut.

11 February
D/N
Scorecard

Ireland; 136/7 (20 overs)	v	Scotland; 99 (18.3 overs)
Gary Wilson 19 (22); Kyle Coetzer 2/14 (3 overs)		Kyle Coetzer 43 (39); Trent Johnston 3/20 (4 overs)

Ireland won by 37 runs.
Dubai Sports City Cricket Stadium, Dubai
Umpires: Paul Baldwin (Ger) and Subhash Modi (Ken)
Player of the match: Trent Johnston (Ire)

- Ireland won the toss and elected to bat.

=== Group B ===
Pos	Team	Pld	W	L	T	NR	Pts	NRR
1	United Arab Emirates	3	3	0	0	0	6	1.174
2	Netherlands	3	2	1	0	0	4	0.116
3	Kenya	3	1	2	0	0	2	0.309
4	Canada	3	0	3	0	0	0	−1.611

9 February
Scorecard

United Arab Emirates; 165/5 (20 overs)	v	Kenya; 150/5 (20 overs)
Arfan Haider 59 (44); Lameck Onyango 2/32 (4 overs)		Collins Obuya 42* (31); Ahmed Raza 2/17 (4 overs)

United Arab Emirates won by 15 runs.
Sheikh Zayed Stadium, Abu Dhabi
Umpires: Paul Baldwin (Eng) and Sarika Prasad (Sin)
Player of the match: Arfan Haider (UAE)

- United Arab Emirates won the toss and elected to bat.

9 February
D/N
Scorecard

Canada; 142/7 (20 overs)	v	Netherlands; 146/4 (19.1 overs)
Ian Billcliff 37 (30); Pieter Seelaar 2/18 (4 overs)		Bas Zuiderent 43* (41); John Davison 1/24 (4 overs)

Netherlands won by 6 wickets.
Dubai Sports City Cricket Stadium, Dubai
Umpires: Aleem Dar (Pak) and Subhash Modi (Ken)
Player of the match: Bas Zuiderent (Ned)

- Canada won the toss and elected to bat.

10 February
Scorecard

Canada; 138/9 (20 overs)	v	Kenya; 141/1 (14.5 overs)
Ashish Bagai 36 (36); Nehemiah Odhiambo 3/16 (2 overs)		Alex Obanda 79 (48); Sunil Dhaniram 1/17 (4 overs)

Kenya won by 9 wickets.
Dubai Sports City Cricket Stadium, Dubai
Umpires: Jeff Luck (SA) and Sarika Prasad (Sin)
Player of the match: Alex Obanda (Ken)

- Kenya won the toss and elected to field.

10 February
D/N
Scorecard

Netherlands; 164/8 (20 overs)	v	United Arab Emirates; 168/4 (18.5 overs)
Daan van Bunge 76 (48); Qasim Zubair 5/24 (4 overs)		Naeemuddin Aslam 60* (48); Ryan ten Doeschate 1/29 (3 overs)

United Arab Emirates won by 6 wickets.
Dubai Sports City Cricket Stadium, Dubai
Umpires: Aleem Dar (Pak) and Sarika Prasad (Sin)
Player of the match: Naeemuddin Aslam (UAE)

- United Arab Emirates won the toss and elected to field.

11 February
Scorecard

United Arab Emirates; 142/7 (20 overs)	v	Canada; 100 (15.5 overs)
Arfan Haider 46 (43); Khurram Chohan 3/20 (3 overs)		Ashish Bagai 21 (31); Shadeep Silva 2/7 (3 overs)

United Arab Emirates won by 42 runs.
Sheikh Zayed Stadium, Abu Dhabi
Umpires: Jeff Luck (SA) and Sarika Prasad (Sin)
Player of the match: Saqib Ali (UAE)

- Canada won the toss and elected to field.

11 February
Scorecard

Kenya; 130 (19.4 overs)	v	Netherlands; 133/3 (19.1 overs)
Jimmy Kamande 42 (33); Pieter Seelaar 4/19 (4 overs)		Eric Szwarczynski 45 (47); Lameck Onyango 2/17 (4 overs)

Netherlands won by 7 wickets.
Sheikh Zayed Stadium, Abu Dhabi
Umpires: Jeff Luck (SA) and Sarika Prasad (Sin)
Player of the match: Pieter Seelaar (Ned)

- Netherlands won the toss and elected to field.

== Super Four ==
Pos	Team	Pld	W	L	T	NR	Pts	NRR
1	Ireland	3	2	1	0	0	4	1.233
2	Afghanistan	3	2	1	0	0	4	0.100
3	United Arab Emirates	3	1	2	0	0	2	−0.244
4	Netherlands	3	1	2	0	0	2	−1.105

12 February
Scorecard

Afghanistan; 128/9 (20 overs)	v	Netherlands; 132/6 (18.5 overs)
Raees Ahmadzai 23 (23); Mark Jonkman 2/23 (4 overs)		Alexei Kervezee 39 (33); Mohammad Nabi 3/23 (4 overs)

Netherlands won by 4 wickets.
Dubai Sports City Cricket Stadium, Dubai
Umpires: Subhash Modi (Ken) and Sarika Prasad (Sin)
Player of the match: Ryan ten Doeschate (Ned)

- Netherlands won the toss and elected to field.

12 February
Scorecard

Ireland; 152/7 (20 overs)	v	United Arab Emirates; 130 (19.1 overs)
Niall O'Brien 46 (43); Qadar Nawaz 3/23 (4 overs)		Saqib Ali 63 (49); Alex Cusack 3/19 (4 overs)

Ireland won by 22 runs.
Dubai Sports City Cricket Stadium, Dubai
Umpires: Aleem Dar (Pak) and Jeff Luck (SA)
Player of the match: Alex Cusack (Ire)

- Ireland won the toss and elected to bat.

13 February
Scorecard

United Arab Emirates; 100/9 (20 overs)	v	Afghanistan; 101/6 (19.3 overs)
Saqib Ali 24 (33); Mohammad Nabi 3/17 (4 overs)		Noor Ali 38* (47); Shadeep Silva 2/14 (4 overs)

Afghanistan won by 4 wickets.
Dubai Sports City Cricket Stadium, Dubai
Umpires: Paul Baldwin (Eng) and Jeff Luck (SA)
Player of the match: Noor Ali (Afg)

- United Arab Emirates won the toss and elected to bat.

13 February
Scorecard

Ireland; 151/6 (20 overs)	v	Netherlands; 86 (15.3 overs)
Alex Cusack 65 (44); Mark Jonkman 2/21 (3 overs)		Ryan ten Doeschate 32 (20); George Dockrell 4/20 (3.3 overs)

Ireland won by 65 runs.
Dubai Sports City Cricket Stadium, Dubai
Umpires: Aleem Dar (Pak) and Subhash Modi (Ken)
Player of the match: Alex Cusack (Ire)

- Ireland won the toss and elected to bat.

== Final ==
13 February
D/N
Scorecard

Ireland; 142/8 (20 overs)	v	Afghanistan; 147/2 (17.3 overs)
Alex Cusack 28 (22); Nawroz Mangal 3/23 (4 overs)		Mohammad Shahzad 65* (46); Kevin O'Brien 1/16 (2 overs)

Afghanistan won by 8 wickets.
Dubai Sports City Cricket Stadium, Dubai
Umpires: Paul Baldwin (Eng) and Sarika Prasad (Sin)
Player of the match: Mohammad Shahzad (Afg)

- Ireland won the toss and elected to bat.

Both finalists qualified for the 2010 ICC World Twenty20 – Afghanistan for Group C and Ireland for Group D.

== Statistics ==
Most runs		Most wickets	
(Ireland) Niall O'Brien	188	(Afghanistan) Mohammad Nabi	13
(Afghanistan) Noor Ali	182	(Afghanistan) Hameed Hasan	12
(Ireland) Alex Cusack	166	(Ireland) Trent Johnston	10
(United Arab Emirates) Saqib Ali	161	(Ireland) Peter Connell	10
(Ireland) William Porterfield	146	(United Arab Emirates) Shadeep Silva	8
