= 2013 ACC Twenty20 Cup =

Cricket tournament in Nepal

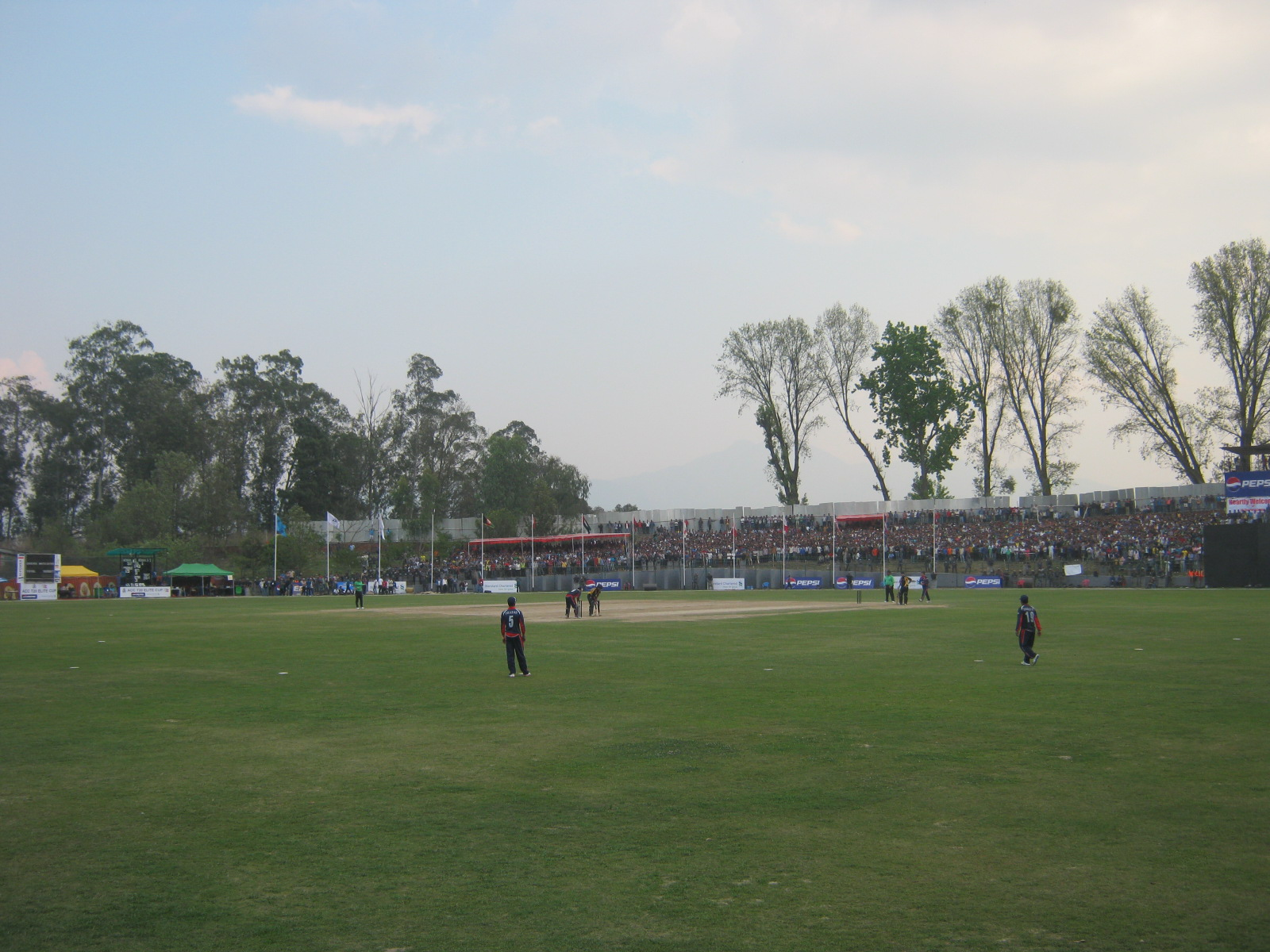
- Administrator: Asian Cricket Council
- Cricket format: Twenty20
- Tournament format: Group Stage with Finals
- Host: Nepal
- Champions: Afghanistan (4th title)
- Participants: 10
- Player of the series: (Nepal) Paras Khadka
- Most runs: (Hong Kong) Waqas Barkat (280)
- Most wickets: (Hong Kong) Tanwir Afzal (11)

The 2013 ACC Twenty20 Cup was a cricket tournament held between March 26 and April 3 in Nepal. The tournament served as a qualifying tournament for the 2013 ICC World Twenty20 Qualifier. Afghanistan has already qualified as an ODI nation while UAE has already qualified as host for the 2013 ICC World Twenty20 Qualifier. Hence, the tournament will, in reality, serve as qualifier for other top two teams from Asian region.

== Group stage ==
=== Group A ===
Team	P	W	L	T	NR	Points	NRR
Hong Kong	4	4	0	0	0	8	+3.776
Nepal	4	3	1	0	0	6	+2.434
Malaysia	4	2	2	0	0	4	-0.007
Maldives	4	1	3	0	0	2	-3.587
Singapore	4	0	4	0	0	0	-2.662

Teams that qualified for the semifinals.

=== Fixtures ===
26 March
09:15 NPT
Scorecard

Malaysia; 103/9 (20 overs)	v	Hong Kong; 108/4 (20 overs)
Ahmad Faiz 22 (38); Nizakat Khan 2/19 (4 overs)		Irfan Ahmed 87 (39); Khizar Hayat 3/9 (3 overs)

Hong Kong won by 6 wickets
Engineering Campus Ground, Lalitpur
Umpires: Vinay Kumar (Nep) and Ram Yadav (Nep)
Player of the match: Irfan Ahmed Hkg

- Hong Kong won the toss and elected to field

26 March
09:15 NPT
Scorecard

Nepal; 171/5 (20 overs)	v	Maldives; 95/7 (20 overs)
Pradeep Airee 59 (28); Mohammed Saafee 2/30 (4 Overs)		Neesham Nasir 20 (23); Paras Khadka 2/7 (3 Overs)

Nepal won by 76 runs
Tribhuvan University International Cricket Ground, Kirtipur
Umpires: I Kamaruzzaman(Tha) and AR Srinivasan (Oma)
Player of the match: Pradeep Airee (Nep)

- Maldives won the toss and elected to field

27 March
09:15 NPT
Scorecard

Singapore; 132/9 (20 overs)	v	Maldives; 133/5 (16.4 overs)
Kshitij Shinde 33 (41); Ishan Jayakody 2/19 (3 overs)		Mohamed Rishwan 48 (29); Abhiraj Singh 2/9 (4 overs)

Maldives won by 5 wickets
Engineering Campus Ground, Lalitpur
Umpires: Himal Giri (Nep) and Adhip Pradhan (Nep)
Player of the match: Mohamed Rishwan (Mdv)

- Maldives won the toss and elected to field

27 March
09:15 NPT
Scorecard

Nepal; 115/9 (20 overs)	v	Hong Kong; 116/4 (16.3 overs)
Gyanendra Malla 38 (39); Nadeem Ahmed 3/18 (4 Overs)		Nizakat Khan 42 (33); Basanta Regmi 3/23 (4 Overs)

Hong Kong won by 6 wickets
Tribhuvan University International Cricket Ground, Kirtipur
Umpires: Imran Mustafa (Kuw) and I Kamaruzzaman (Tha)
Player of the match: Nadeem Ahmed (Hkg)

- Nepal won the toss and elected to bat

28 March
09:15 NPT
Scorecard

Singapore; 171/6 (20 overs)	v	Malaysia; 172/4 (18 overs)
Chaminda Ruwan 47 (25); Hammad Ullah Khan 1/15 (3 overs)		Suhan Alagaratnam 70* (37); Shoaib Razzak 1/20 (3 overs)

Malaysia won by 6 wickets
Tribhuvan University International Cricket Ground, Kirtipur
Umpires: Adhip Pradhan (Nep) and Durga Subedi (Nep)
Player of the match: Suhan Alagaratnam (Mas)

- Malaysia won the toss and elected to field

29 March
09:15 NPT
Scorecard

Hong Kong; 198/4 (20 overs)	v	Maldives; 45 (10 overs)
Waqas Barkat 109 (83); Mihusan Hamid 2/39 (4 overs)		Hassan Haziq 17 (7); Tanwir Afzal 3/21 (4 overs)

Hong Kong won by 153 runs
Engineering Campus Ground, Lalitpur
Umpires: Basu Karn (Nep) and Adhip Pradhan (Nep)
Player of the match: Waqas Barkat (Hkg)

- Maldives won the toss and elected to field

30 March
09:15 NPT
Scorecard

Hong Kong; 198/3 (20 overs)	v	Singapore; 159/8 (20 overs)
Waqas Barkat 69* (51); Abhiraj Singh 2/15 (4 overs)		Chaminda Ruwan 57 (44); Aizaz Khan 2/22 (3 overs)

Hong Kong won by 39 runs
Engineering Campus Ground, Lalitpur
Umpires: AR Srinivasan (Oma) and Ram Yadav (Nep)
Player of the match: Irfan Ahmed (Hkg)

- Hong Kong won the toss and elected to bat

30 March
09:15 NPT
(Scoreboard)

Nepal; 163/8 (20 overs)	v	Malaysia; 144/9(20 overs)
Paras Khadka 87 (54); Shahrulnizam Yusof 2/25 (4 Overs)		Shafiq Sharif 53* (38); Prithu Baskota 2/25 (4 Overs)

Nepal won by 19 runs
Tribhuvan University International Cricket Ground, Kirtipur
Umpires: Imran Mustafa (Kuw) and I Kamaruzzaman (Tha)
Player of the match: Paras Khadka (Nep)

- Malaysia won the toss and elected to field

31 March 2013
09:15 NPT
(scoreboard)

Maldives; 85 (19.4 overs)	v	Malaysia; 88/2(11.2 overs)
Abdullah Shahid 27 (35); Khizar Hayat 3/12 (3.4 Overs)		Ahmed Faiz 46* (35); Ameel Mauroof 1/17 (3 Overs)

Malaysia won by 8 wickets
Engineering Campus Ground, Lalitpur
Umpires: Himal Giri (Nep) and Shailendra Nepal (Nep)
Player of the match: Ahmed Faiz (Mas)

- Malaysia won the toss and elected to field

31 March
09:15 NPT
(scoreboard)

Nepal; 210/5 (20 overs)	v	Singapore; 89 (15.1 overs)
Binod Bhandari 54 (34); Anish Param 2/44 (4 Overs)		Saad Janjua 20 (12); Basanta Regmi 3/17 (4 Overs)

Nepal won by 121 runs
Tribhuvan University International Cricket Ground, Kirtipur
Umpires: Imran Mustafa (Kuw) and AR Srinivasan (Oma)
Player of the match: Paras Khadka (Nep)

- Nepal won the toss and elected to bat

=== Group B ===
Team	P	W	L	T	NR	Points	NRR
United Arab Emirates	4	4	0	0	0	8	+2.581
Afghanistan	4	3	1	0	0	6	+1.478
Kuwait	4	2	2	0	0	4	+0.164
Oman	4	1	3	0	0	2	-1.130
Bahrain	4	0	4	0	0	0	-3.041

Teams that qualified for the semifinals.

=== Fixtures ===
26 March
13:15 NPT
Scorecard

Afghanistan; 150 (18.5 overs)	v	Oman; 106/9 (19.1 overs)
Karim Sadiq 46 (27); Amir Ali 3/29 (4 overs)		Vaibhav Wategaonkar 31 (47); Mohammad Nabi 4/18 (4 overs)

Afghanistan won by 44 runs
Tribhuvan University International Cricket Ground, Kirtipur
Umpires: Imran Mustafa (Kuw) and Buddhi Pradhan (Nep)
Player of the match: Mohammad Nabi (Afg)

- Afghanistan won the toss and elected to bat

26 March
13:15 NPT
Scorecard

Kuwait; 172/7 (20 overs)	v	United Arab Emirates; 176/5 (18.5 overs)
Yasar Idrees 46 (33); Fayyaz Ahmed 3/16 (4 overs)		Amjad Ali 39 (27); Hisham Mirza 2/36 (4 overs)

United Arab Emirates won by 5 wickets
Engineering Campus Ground, Lalitpur
Umpires: Himal Giri (Nep) and Durga Subedi (Nep)
Player of the match: Rohan Mustafa (UAE)

- United Arab Emirates won the toss and elected to field

27 March
13:15 NPT
Scorecard

Bahrain; 132 (18.4 overs)	v	Kuwait; 135/7(19.1 overs)
Anasim Khan 27 (28); Hisham Mirza 4/13 (2.4 overs)		Saad Khalid 43 (35); Qamar Saeed 2/21 (4 overs)

Kuwait won by 3 wickets
Tribhuvan University International Cricket Ground, Kirtipur
Umpires: Vinay Kumar (Nep) and AR Srinivasan (Oma)
Player of the match: Sibtain Raza (Kuw)

- Bahrain won the toss and elected to bat

27 March
13:15 NPT
Scorecard

Oman; 82 (18.1 overs)	v	United Arab Emirates; 84/3(12.3 overs)
Vaibhav Wategaonkar 40* (45); Rohan Mustafa 3/11 (4 overs)		Bakhtiyar Palekar 28 (38); Ajay Lalcheta 1/14 (3 overs)

United Arab Emirates won by 7 wickets
Engineering Campus Ground, Lalitpur
Umpires: Basu Karn (Nep) and Buddhi Pradhan (Nep)
Player of the match: Rohan Mustafa (UAE)

- United Arab Emirates won the toss and elected to field

28 March
13:15 NPT
Scorecard

Afghanistan; 157/5 (20 overs)	v	Bahrain; 85 (15.5 overs)
Gulbodin Naib 46 (41); Sameer Yousuf 2/19 (2 overs)		Tahir Dar 14 (19); Gulbodin Naib 4/23 (4 overs)

Afghanistan won by 72 runs
Tribhuvan University International Cricket Ground, Kirtipur
Umpires: Buddhi Pradhan (Nep) and Ram Yadav (Nep)
Player of the match: Gulbodin Naib (Afg)

- Bahrain won the toss and elected to field

29 March
13:15 NPT
Scorecard

Kuwait; 187/7 (20 overs)	v	Oman; 161 (18.5 overs)
Yasar Idrees 71 (39); Aamer Ali 3/27 (4 overs)		Zeeshan Siddiqui 36 (22); Syed Rizwan Ali 3/16 (4 overs)

Kuwait won by 26 runs
Engineering Campus Ground, Lalitpur
Umpires: Vinay Kumar (Nep) and Shailendra Nepal (Nep)
Player of the match: Yasar Idrees (Kuw)

- Kuwait won the toss and elected to bat

30 March
13:15 NPT
Scorecard

Afghanistan; 143/8 (20 overs)	v	United Arab Emirates; 146/4 (19.2 overs)
Mohammad Nabi 72 (46); Amjad Javed 3/9 (4 overs)		Swapnil Patil 34 (32); Nasim Baras 1/15 (3 overs)

United Arab Emirates won by 6 wickets
Tribhuvan University International Cricket Ground, Kirtipur
Umpires: Vinay Kumar (Nep) and Durga Subedi (Nep)
Player of the match: Amjad Javed (UAE)

- Afghanistan won the toss and elected to bat

30 March
13:15 NPT
Scorecard

Bahrain; 93 (17.4 overs)	v	Oman; 96/4(14.4 overs)
Qamar Saeed 22 (25); Aamir Kaleem 4/6 (3 overs)		Ghazanfar Iqbal 33 (20); Vasantha Kunder 2/17 (4 overs)

Oman won by 6 wickets
Engineering Campus Ground, Lalitpur
Umpires: Shailendra Nepal (Nep) and Buddhi Pradhan (Nep)
Player of the match: Aamir Kaleem (Kuw)

- Bahrain won the toss and elected to bat

31 March
13:15 NPT
Scorecard

Kuwait; 133 (19.2 overs)	v	Afghanistan; 136/6 (19.1 overs)
Yasar Idrees 64 (40); Samiullah Shenwari 3/18 (4 overs)		Karim Sadiq 42 (37); Azmatullah Nazeer 2/24 (4 overs)

Afghanistan won by 4 wickets
Engineering Campus Ground, Lalitpur
Umpires: Vinay Kumar (Nep) and Basu Karn (Nep)
Player of the match: Samiullah Shenwari (Afg)

- Afghanistan won the toss & elected to field

31 March
13:15 NPT
Scorecard

United Arab Emirates; 226/5 (20 overs)	v	Bahrain; 112/8 (20 overs)
Abdul Shakoor 84 (45); Imran Sajjad 1/32 (4 overs)		Arshad Latif 19 (24); Adil Reyal 2/27 (3 overs)

United Arab Emirates won by 114 runs
Tribhuvan University International Cricket Ground, Kirtipur
Umpires: I Kamaruzzaman (Tha) and Buddhi Pradhan (Nep)
Player of the match: Abdul Shakoor (UAE)

- United Arab Emirates won the toss & elected to bat

== Semi-finals ==
2 April 2013
09:15 NPT
Scorecard

Hong Kong; 109/9 (19 overs)	v	Afghanistan; 112/3 (17.1 overs)
Waqas Barkat 17 (14); Hamza Hotak 3/14 (4 overs)		Najibullah Zadran 37* (42); Karan Shah 2/18 (4 overs)

Afghanistan won by 7 wickets
Tribhuvan University International Cricket Ground, Kirtipur
Umpires: Buddhi Pradhan (Nep) and Durga Subedi (Nep)
Player of the match: Hamza Hotak (Afg)

- Afghanistan won the toss & elected to field

2 April 2013
13:15 NPT
Scorecard

United Arab Emirates; 133/9 (20 overs)	v	Nepal; 134/4 (19.1 overs)
Swapnil Patil 17 (14); Prithu Baskota 3/20 (4 overs)		Pradeep Airee 58 (57); Ahmed Raza 2/15 (4 overs)

Nepal won by 6 wickets
Tribhuvan University International Cricket Ground, Kirtipur
Umpires: Imran Mustafa (Kuw) and I Kamaruzzaman (Tha)
Player of the match: Prithu Baskota (Nep) and Pradeep Airee (Nep)

- United Arab Emirates won the toss & elected to bat

== 3rd place play-off ==
3 April
09:15 NPT
Scorecard

United Arab Emirates; 166/7 (20 overs)	v	Hong Kong; 134/8 (20 overs)
Amjad Javed 51* (25); Tanwir Afzal 3/13 (4 overs)		Waqas Barkat 41 (41); Shadeep Silva 3/21 (4 overs)

United Arab Emirates won by 32 runs
Engineering Campus Ground, Lalitpur
Umpires: Vinay Kumar (Nep) and Durga Subedi (Nep)
Player of the match: Amjad Javed (UAE)

- Hong Kong won the toss and elected to field.
- United Arab Emirates won the 3rd place play-off

== Final ==
3 April
13:15 NPT
Scorecard

Nepal; 135/6 (20 overs)	v	Afghanistan; 137/3 (17.5 overs)
Paras Khadka 50 (40); Gulbodin Naib 2/20 (4 overs)		Gulbodin Naib 43* (42); Paras Khadka 1/13 (2 overs)

Afghanistan won by 7 wickets
Tribhuvan University International Cricket Ground, Kirtipur
Umpires: Imran Mustafa (Kuw) and I Kamaruzzamman (Tha)
Player of the match: Gulbodin Naib (Afg)

- Afghanistan won the toss and elected to field.
- Afghanistan won the 2012/13 ACC Twenty20 Cup

== Statistics ==
=== Most runs ===
The top five highest run scorers (total runs) are included in this table.

Player	Team	Runs	Inns	Avg	S/R	HS	100s	50s
Waqas Barkat	Hong Kong	280	6	56.00	126.69	109	1	1
Irfan Ahmed	Hong Kong	223	6	37.16	187.39	87	0	2
Paras Khadka	Nepal	207	6	41.40	141.78	87	0	2
Yasar Idrees	Kuwait	194	4	48.50	160.00	71	0	2
Abdul Shakoor	United Arab Emirates	193	6	32.16	155.64	84	0	1

=== Most wickets ===
The following table contains the five leading wicket-takers.

Player	Team	Wkts	Mts	Ave	S/R	Econ	BBI
Tanwir Afzal	Hong Kong	11	6	10.18	10.9	5.60	3/13
Basanta Regmi	Nepal	10	6	13.60	14.4	5.66	3/17
Khizar Hayat	Malaysia	9	4	10.66	9.7	6.54	3/9
Fayyaz Ahmed	United Arab Emirates	9	6	13.11	14.6	5.36	3/16
Hisham Mirza	Kuwait	8	3	10.50	7.8	8.00	4/13

== See also ==
- 2013 ICC World Twenty20 Qualifier
- World Cricket League Africa Region
