= Mark Ferguson (cricketer) =

Personal information
- Full name: Mark David Corson Ferguson
- Born: 5 January 1981 (age 45); Paisley, Scotland
- Batting: Right-handed
- Role: Wicket-keeper

International information
- National side: Hong Kong (2011–2014)
- Source: Cricinfo, 25 February 2016

Mark David Corson Ferguson (born 5 January 1981) is an international cricketer who made his debut for the Hong Kong national team in 2011. He was born in Scotland, but moved to Hong Kong in 2007.

Ferguson was born in Paisley, Renfrewshire, and played club cricket for Kelburne and Greenock. A wicket-keeper and right-handed batsman, he made his debut for the Scotland under-19s at the age of 17, and later represented the team at the 1999 European Under-19 Championship. Ferguson was a member of Scotland's National Cricket Academy for a period, and he also made appearances Scotland A and Scotland B.

In 2007, Ferguson relocated to Hong Kong for work reasons, and began playing for the Hong Kong Cricket Club. He eventually met the residency qualifications for the Hong Kong national team, and made his international debut at the 2011 ACC Twenty20 Cup in Nepal. Hong Kong made the final of that tournament and consequently qualified for the 2012 World Twenty20 Qualifier, where Ferguson was a member of Hong Kong's squad but did not play any matches. He did not play in another international tournament until the 2014 World Cup Qualifier in New Zealand, where he served as his team's primary wicket-keeper. In seven matches at the tournament, Ferguson batted only twice, scoring a duck against the United Arab Emirates and one run against Nepal. He did, however, have a successful tournament keeping wicket, recording twelve dismissals (all catches).
