= Kevin Darlington =

Guyanese-born American cricketer

Personal information
- Full name: Kevin Godfrey Darlington
- Born: 26 April 1972 (age 54); New Amsterdam, East Berbice-Corentyne, Guyana
- Batting: Right-handed
- Bowling: Right-arm fast-medium
- Role: Bowler

International information
- National side: United States (2010–2011)

Domestic team information
- Years: Team
- 1994/95–2001/02: Guyana

Career statistics
Competition	FC	LA	T20
Matches	30	22	3
Runs scored	154	3	–
Batting average	6.41	3.00	–
100s/50s	0/0	0/0	–
Top score	18	3*	–
Balls bowled	4,508	840	72
Wickets	79	18	2
Bowling average	28.79	25.27	45.00
5 wickets in innings	3	0	0
10 wickets in match	0	0	0
Best bowling	6/25	2/14	2/19
Catches/stumpings	7/–	2/–	0/–
- Source: Cricinfo, 7 March 2010

Kevin Godfrey Darlington (born 26 April 1972) is a Guyanese-American cricket coach and former player. He played for Guyana in West Indian domestic cricket from 1995 to 2002, as a right-arm fast-medium bowler. He later played international cricket for the United States from 2010 to 2011. He has since coached at national level in the United States.

== Career with Guyana ==
Darlington made his first-class debut for Guyana in 1995 against Barbados and his List A debut in the same season against the Leeward Islands. From 1995 to 2002 Darlington represented Guyana in 30 first-class matches, with his final appearance for the side coming against the Leeward Islands. In List-A cricket he represented Guyana in 22 matches from 1995 to 2000, with his final match coming against Bermuda.

In his 30 first-class matches for Guyana he took 79 wickets at a bowling average of 28.79, with three five wicket hauls and best figures of 6/25 against Trinidad and Tobago in 2001. In List-A cricket he took 18 wickets at an average of 25.27, with best figures of 2/14.

== Move to America ==
Following the end of his first-class career with Guyana, Darlington moved to the United States. In 2010 he made his debut for the United States against the UAE in a pre-tournament warm up match for the 2010 ICC World Twenty20 Qualifier. During the tournament Darlington made his full Twenty20 debut against Scotland, where he took 2 wickets as the USA went on to win by 6 wickets. He followed this up by playing matches against Ireland and Afghanistan, both of which the United States lost.

Later in February 2010, Darlington represented the United States in the 2010 ICC World Cricket League Division Five, where he ended the tournament as the leading wicket taker with 14 wickets as the United States gained promotion to the 2010 ICC World Cricket League Division Four in Italy.

== Coaching career ==
In 2020, Darlington was named head coach of the United States national under-19 cricket team.

In 2023, Darlington was named interim head coach of the USA senior team for the 2023 ICC Cricket World Cup Qualifier Play-off in Namibia.
