= Aditya Thyagarajan =

Indian-born American cricketer

Personal information
- Born: 7 November 1978 (age 48); Bangalore, Karnataka, India
- Batting: Right-handed
- Bowling: Leg break

Career statistics
Competition	List A	Twenty20
Matches	3	2
Runs scored	58	86
Batting average	19.33	86.00
100s/50s	0/0	0/1;
Top score	42	72*
Balls bowled	78	–
Wickets	5	–
Bowling average	11.60	–
5 wickets in innings	0	–
10 wickets in match	0	–
Best bowling	3/30	–
Catches/stumpings	1/–	1/–
- Source: ESPNcricinfo, 7 March 2010

Aditya Thyagarajan (born 7 November 1978) is an Indian-born American cricketer. Thyagarajan, a right-handed batsman who bowls leg break, currently represents the United States national cricket team.

Thyagarajan made his debut for the United States against Mozambique. Thyagarajan played eight matches for the United States in that tournament.

Thyagarajan made his List-A debut for the United States against Barbados in the 2008/09 West Indies Cricket Board Cup. Thyagarajan made two further appearances for the United States in that tournament against Trinidad and Tobago and the Combined Campuses and Colleges. The United States lost all three matches.

Later in 2008 Thyagarajan represented the United States in the 2008 ICC Americas Championship Division One, where he played three matches against Suriname, Argentina and the Cayman Islands, Bermuda and Canada, as the United States went on to win the tournament.

In 2010 he made his unofficial Twenty20 debut for the United States against the UAE in a pre-tournament warm up match for the 2010 ICC World Twenty20 Qualifier. During the tournament Thyagarajan made his full Twenty20 debut against Ireland, where he scored 72 not out. Thyagarajan played one further match against Afghanistan in the tournament, both matches he played in the United States lost.

Later in February 2010, Thyagarajan represented the United States in the 2010 ICC World Cricket League Division Five, where he helped the United States gain promotion to the 2010 ICC World Cricket League Division Four in Italy.

After making a comeback from a knee injury, which he suffered at 2011 ICC Cricket World League Division Three, in 2012 Thyagarajan was selected for the 2012 ICC World Cricket League Division Four which takes place from 3 to 10 September 2012 in Malaysia.
