= Hammadullah Khan =

Pakistani-born Malaysian cricketer (born 1981)

Personal information
- Born: 1 October 1981 (age 45); Islamabad, Pakistan
- Batting: Right-handed
- Bowling: Right-arm medium-fast
- Role: Batsman

International information
- National side: Malaysia (2011–2015)

Domestic team information
- Years: Team
- 2002: Islamabad

Career statistics
Competition	LA
Matches	5
Runs scored	203
Batting average	40.60
100s/50s	0/1
Top score	94
Balls bowled	78
Wickets	0
Bowling average	–
5 wickets in innings	–
10 wickets in match	–
Best bowling	–
Catches/stumpings	0/–
- Source: CricketArchive, 29 January 2015

Hammadullah Khan (or Hammad Ullah Khan; born 1 October 1981) is a Pakistani-born Malaysian cricketer. A right-handed batsman, he played five limited overs matches for Islamabad in 2002. Emigrating to Malaysia, he made his debut for the Malaysian national side at the 2011 World Cricket League Division Six tournament, and has since played for the side in several one-day and Twenty20 competitions.

== Career in Pakistan ==
Born in Islamabad, Hammadullah played for the Islamabad under-19s during the 2000–01 Grade-1 Under-19 Tournament. The following season, aged 20, he captained the Pakistan Education Board's team in Grade II of the PCB Patron's Trophy. Opening the batting, he scored 119 runs from three matches in the tournament, with a best of 80 runs in the second innings against Attock Refinery Limited. Later in the season, in March 2002, Hammadullah was selected in Islamabad's squad for the One Day National Tournament. He played in five of the team's six matches in the tournament (the other being abandoned without a ball being bowled), making his debut against Khan Research Laboratories.

Islamabad used 27 players during the competition, more than any other team, and Hammadullah was one of only three players to feature in all matches, the others being Saad Janjua (a future Singaporean national team player) and former ODI player Irfan Bhatti. Hammadullah and Ameer Khan led Islamabad's batting with 203 runs each, with their highest scores both coming in the same match, against Peshawar. Hammadullah made 94 runs from 134 balls and Ameer 105 runs from 121 balls, with the pair putting on 197 runs for the third wicket. As of January 2015, this remained a record partnership for Islamabad at List A level, surpassing Ashar Zaidi and Ali Raza's 167-run opening partnership made against Agriculture Development Bank during the 1999–2000 season.

During the 2002–03 season, Islamabad played in the three-day Cornelius Trophy, with the tournament's two finalists (from 26 participants) qualifying for the first-class Quaid-i-Azam Trophy. Hammadullah played four matches in the tournament, but was omitted from the team after a play-off match against the Rahim Yar Khan District team. Islamabad went on to win the tournament, defeating Quetta by an innings and 105 runs in the final. Although he never again played at high levels, Hammadullah remained involved in Pakistani domestic cricket until the 2006–07 season, playing for Islamabad teams in inter-regional tournaments, and also for Pakistan Television and Pakistan Military Accounts Department in the Grade-II Patron's Trophy.

== Career in Malaysia ==
After emigrating to Malaysia, Hammadullah made his debut for the national side at the 2011 World Cricket League Division Six tournament, hosted by Kuala Lumpur. He took nine wickets from six matches at the tournament, second only to Eszrafiq Aziz (12) for Malaysia, and scored a half-century, 53 runs, in the team's loss to Guernsey in the tournament final. Hammadullah's next appearances for Malaysia came in the 2011 ACC Twenty20 Cup, played in Nepal. He top-scored in each of the team's four appearances, finishing with 183 runs to place fifth amongst all teams in runs scored. He was man of the match against the Maldives and Bhutan, scoring half-centuries in both matches.

Despite being initially named in the squad for the 2012 WCL Division Five tournament, Hammadullah was unable to play in any matches. Malaysia lost to Singapore in the tournament's final, but both teams gained promotion to the 2012 WCL Division Four tournament, where Hammadullah played three matches. At the 2013 ACC Twenty20 Cup the following year, he played in all of Malaysia's matches, with his best performance being 1/15 from three overs in the team's victory over Singapore.

Malaysia had been demoted to 2014 WCL Division Five, but placed second behind Jersey at that tournament to gain entry to the 2014 Division Four. Hammadullah had been unable to play in the Division Five tournament, but did play in Division Four, where he scored only two runs from three innings. Malaysia won the tournament to gain promotion to the 2014 Division Three, but Hammadullah missed out on that tournament. However, in the gap between the Division Five and Four tournaments, he also participated in the 2014 ACC Premier League, top-scoring with 38 runs in Malaysia's loss to Hong Kong in the final match. In January 2015, Hammadullah was selected in Malaysia's squad at the 2015 ACC Twenty20 Cup, gaining selection after a late injury to Anwar Arudin.
