= Engineering Campus Ground =

Cricket ground in Nepal

- Pulchowk Cricket Ground; Lalitpur Cricket Ground

Ground information
- Location: Lalitpur, Nepal
- Capacity: 5,000
- Owner: Pulchowk Engineering Campus
- Operator: Pulchowk Engineering Campus
- Tenants: Pulchowk Cricket Club
- End names
- Bagmati River End; Campus Block End

Team information
Nepal cricket team
Lalitpur Patriots
- As of 19 July 2014

Engineering Campus Cricket Ground, also known as Pulchowk Cricket Ground or Lalitpur Cricket Ground, is a cricket ground in Lalitpur, Nepal.

Currently this ground is the homeground of Pulchowk Cricket Club.

== Major events ==
- 1998 ACC Trophy
- 2005 ACC Under-19 Cup
- 2009 ACC Under-17 Cup
- 2010 ICC World Cricket League Division Five
- 2011 ACC Twenty20 Cup
- 2013 ACC Twenty20 Cup

== See also ==
- List of cricket grounds in Nepal
