= Timroy Allen =

Jamaican-born American cricketer

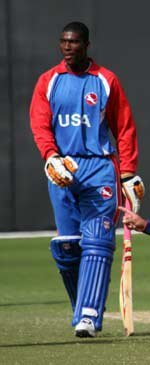

Personal information
- Full name: Timroy Patrick Allen
- Born: 22 January 1987 (age 39); Westmoreland, Cornwall, Jamaica
- Batting: Right-handed
- Bowling: Right-arm fast-medium; Right-arm offbreak

International information
- National side: United States
- T20I debut (cap 12): 18 August 2019 v Bermuda
- Last T20I: 24 August 2019 v Cayman Islands

Domestic team information
- Years: Team
- 2016: Jamaica Tallawahs

Career statistics
Competition	T20I	LA	T20
Matches	5	15	21
Runs scored	27	270	193
Batting average	13.50	22.50	12.86
100s/50s	0/0	0/1	0/1
Top score	11*	69	50*
Balls bowled	18	426	168
Wickets	1	8	8
Bowling average	28.00	48.87	34.25
5 wickets in innings	0	0	0
10 wickets in match	0	0	0
Best bowling	1/11	2/36	2/27
Catches/stumpings	3/–	1/–	8/–
- Source: Cricinfo, 26 August 2025

Timroy Patrick Allen (born 22 January 1987) is a Jamaican-American cricketer who played for the United States national cricket team. Allen made his List A debut for the United States against Barbados in the 2008/09 West Indies Cricket Board Cup. Allen made two further appearances for the United States in that tournament against Trinidad and Tobago and the Combined Campuses and Colleges. The United States lost all three matches.

Later in 2008 Allen represented the United States in the 2008 ICC Americas Championship Division One, where he played three matches against Suriname, Argentina and the Cayman Islands, as the United States went on to win the tournament.

In 2010 he made his unofficial Twenty20 debut for the United States against the UAE in a pre-tournament warm up match for the 2010 ICC World Twenty20 Qualifier. During the tournament Allen made his full Twenty20 debut against Scotland, where the USA went on to win by 6 wickets. He followed this up by playing matches against Ireland and Afghanistan, both of which the United States lost.

Later in February 2010, Allen represented the United States in the 2010 ICC World Cricket League Division Five, where he helped the United States gained promotion to the 2010 ICC World Cricket League Division Four in Italy.

Allen was selected for the 2016 Caribbean Premier League by the Jamaica Tallawahs, which represented a return of sorts to his home country. This was part of an initiative to spread the popularity of cricket to the American nations, and he played six games for the team that season. He was retained for the next year's competition.

In June 2019, he was named in a 30-man training squad for the United States cricket team, ahead of the Regional Finals of the 2018–19 ICC T20 World Cup Americas Qualifier tournament in Bermuda. The following month, he was one of twelve players to sign a three-month central contract with USA Cricket. In August 2019, he was named in the United States' squad for the Regional Finals of the 2018–19 ICC T20 World Cup Americas Qualifier tournament. He made his Twenty20 International (T20I) debut for the United States against Bermuda on 18 August 2019.

In June 2021, he was selected to take part in the Minor League Cricket tournament in the United States following the players' draft.
