= Adil Hanif =

Pakistani-born Bahraini cricketer (born 1978)

Personal information
- Born: 25 February 1978 (age 48); Lahore, Punjab, Pakistan
- Batting: Right-handed
- Bowling: Right-arm off break

International information
- National side: Bahrain
- T20I debut (cap 1): 20 January 2019 v Saudi Arabia
- Last T20I: 24 January 2019 v Qatar

Domestic team information
- Years: Team
- 1998–2002: Islamabad

Career statistics
Competition	FC	LA
Matches	2	7
Runs scored	26	103
Batting average	8.66	17.16
100s/50s	0/0	0/1
Top score	21	52
Balls bowled	66	–
Wickets	0	–
Bowling average	–	–
5 wickets in innings	–	–
10 wickets in match	–	–
Best bowling	–	–
Catches/stumpings	1/–	2/–
- Source: Cricinfo, 24 January 2019

Muhammad Adil Hanif (born 25 February 1978) is a Pakistani-born former cricketer who played for the Bahrain national cricket team. Hanif is a right-handed batsman who bowls right-arm off break.

== Pakistani domestic career ==
Hanif made his List A debut for Islamabad against Peshawar in 1998. Two years later he made his first-class debut for Islamabad against Habib Bank Limited. In the same season he played his second and final first-class match against Peshawar. From 1998 to 2002 Hanif played seven List A matches for Islamabad, with his final List-A match for the team coming against Peshawar.

In his seven List A matches for Islamabad, he scored 103 runs at a batting average of 17.16, with a single half century score of 52 against Allied Bank Limited in 2002.

== Move to Bahrain ==
Sometime after 2004 Hanif moved to Bahrain, where in 2009 he made his debut for Bahrain against Gibraltar in the 2009 ICC World Cricket League Division Seven held in Guernsey, where Hanif helped Bahrain to promotion to Division Six. Later in 2009 Hanif represented Bahrain in the 2009 ICC World Cricket League Division Six in Singapore, where he helped Bahrain to back-to-back promotions. In February 2010, Hanif represented Bahrain in the 2010 ICC World Cricket League Division Five, where he helped Bahrain to remain in that division.

His Twenty20 International (T20I) debut for Bahrain was against Saudi Arabia in Oman on 20 January 2019 in the 2019 ACC Western Region T20 tournament.
