= Saurabh Verma =

Indian-born American cricketer

Personal information
- Born: 4 November 1981 (age 45); Bhopal, Madhya Pradesh, India
- Batting: Right-handed
- Bowling: Leg Spin Googly

International information
- National side: United States

Career statistics
Competition	T20
Matches	2
Runs scored	–
Batting average	–
100s/50s	–/–
Top score	–
Balls bowled	12
Wickets	1
Bowling average	23.00
5 wickets in innings	–
10 wickets in match	–
Best bowling	1/23
Catches/stumpings	–/–
- Source: Cricinfo, 7 March 2010

Saurabh 'Sunny' Verma (born 4 November 1981) is an Indian born American cricketer. Verma is a right-handed batsman who bowls leg break googly. Verma currently represents the United States national cricket team.

Verma made his debut for the United States in an unofficial Twenty20 against the UAE in a pre-tournament warm up match for the 2010 ICC World Twenty20 Qualifier. During the tournament Verma made his full Twenty20 debut against Scotland, where the USA went on to win by 6 wickets. He followed this up by playing a match against Ireland, which the United States lost.

Later in February 2010, Verma represented the United States in the 2010 ICC World Cricket League Division Five, where he helped the United States gain promotion to the 2010 ICC World Cricket League Division Four in Italy. In June 2021, he was selected to take part in the Minor League Cricket tournament in the United States following the players' draft.
