= Shahzada =

Shahzada, Shahzade, Shahozada, Shahzadeh or Shahzadah may refer to:

== Persons ==
- Shahzada (title), princely title, crown prince, the son of a shah, of the Iranian royal house
  - Şehzade, as used in the Ottoman Empire
- Haji Shahzada (Guantanamo Bay detainee 952) (born 1959), one of the Guantanamo captives whose 2004 CSR Tribunal determined he was not an enemy after all
- Mullah Shahzada (Taliban commander), Taliban commander, reported to have talked his way out of Guantanamo in May 2003, only to return to the battlefield

Surname

- Laila Shahzada (1926–1994), Pakistani abstract painter
- Mohammad Shahzada (born 1986), Bangladeshi cricketer

== Others ==
- Shahzada (horse race), an annual endurance race held in Australia
- SS Shahzada, a number of British freighters
- Shahzada (1955 film), a Hindi film of 1955
- Shehzada, a 1972 Indian Hindi-language film
- Shehzada (2023 film), an Indian Hindi-language period comedy film
- Shehzada Dhami (born 1996), an Indian actor

== See also ==
- Shah (disambiguation)
- Shahzad, a male given name related from the title
- Shahzoda, an Uzbek singer
