= Qais Al Said =

Omani cricketer (born 1979)

Personal information
- Full name: Qais Bin Khalid Al Said
- Born: 20 August 1979 (age 47); New York City, New York, United States
- Batting: Left-handed
- Bowling: Left-arm medium pace
- Role: All-rounder

Domestic team information
- Years: Team
- 2012: Oman

Career statistics
| Competition | Twenty20 |
|---|---|
| Matches | 7 |
| Runs scored | 14 |
| Batting average | 2.80 |
| 100s/50s | 0/0 |
| Top score | 5 |
| Balls bowled | 31 |
| Wickets | 1 |
| Bowling average | 61.00 |
| 5 wickets in innings | 0 |
| 10 wickets in match | – |
| Best bowling | 1/16 |
| Catches/stumpings | 0/– |
- Source: Cricinfo, 20 April 2026

Qais Bin Khalid Al Said (born 20 August 1979) is an Omani former cricketer. Al Said was a left-handed batsman and left-arm medium-pace bowler. He was born in New York City, New York, United States and is a member of Al Bu Said dynasty.

Al Said played all seven of his recognised senior matches for Oman in the 2012 ICC World Twenty20 Qualifier. He made his Twenty20 debut against Italy in the tournament's opening group match at Dubai. His best bowling figures were 1 for 16 against Namibia, the only wicket of his recognised senior career. His final appearance came against Denmark in the 15th-place play-off.

In his seven Twenty20 matches, Al Said scored 14 runs with a highest score of 5 and took one wicket from 31 deliveries. He did not score a half-century or century, and he did not take a five-wicket haul.
