= Carl Wright (cricketer) =

Jamaican-born American cricketer

Personal information
- Full name: Carl Da Costa Wright
- Born: 17 September 1977 (age 49); Saint Elizabeth, Cornwall, Jamaica
- Batting: Right-handed
- Role: Batsman; occasional wicket-keeper

International information
- National side: United States

Domestic team information
- Years: Team
- 1997/98–1999/00: Jamaica

Career statistics
Competition	FC	LA	T20
Matches	11	3	3
Runs scored	379	112	92
Batting average	18.95	37.33	30.66
100s/50s	0/2	0/1	0/1
Top score	95*	90	62
Catches/stumpings	14/–	0/–	3/1
- Source: Cricinfo, 7 March 2010

Carl Da Costa Wright (born 17 September 1977) is a Jamaican born former American international cricketer. Wright was a right-handed batsman who played occasionally as a wicket-keeper. Wright represented the United States national cricket team from 2006 to 2011.

== Jamaica ==
Wright made his first-class debut for Jamaica against Barbados in 1998. From 1998 to 2000 Wright represented Jamaica in 11 first-class matches, with his final match coming against the Leeward Islands. In his 11 first-class matches he scored 379 at a batting average of 18.95, with two half centuries and a high score of 95* against the Windward Islands.

== Move to America ==
Wright made his debut for the United States against the Cayman Islands in the 2006 ICC Americas Championship Division One 2. Wright played 9 matches for the United States in the tournament, as they went on to finish second behind eventual winners Bermuda.

Wright made his List A debut for the United States against Barbados in the 2008/09 West Indies Cricket Board Cup. Wright made two further appearances for the United States in that tournament against Trinidad and Tobago, where he scored 90*, and against the Combined Campuses and Colleges. The United States lost all three matches.

Later in 2008 Wright represented the United States in the 2008 ICC Americas Championship Division One, where he played matches against Suriname, Argentina, the Cayman Islands, Bermuda and Canada as the United States went on to win the tournament.

In 2010 he made his unofficial Twenty20 debut for the United States against the UAE in a pre-tournament warm up match for the 2010 ICC World Twenty20 Qualifier. During the tournament Wright made his full Twenty20 debut against Scotland, where he scored 62 runs as the USA went on to win by 6 wickets, with Wright named as the man of the match. He followed this up by playing matches against Ireland and Afghanistan, both of which the United States lost.

Later in February 2010, Wright represented the United States in the 2010 ICC World Cricket League Division Five, where he helped the United States gain promotion to the 2010 ICC World Cricket League Division Four in Italy.
