= Sudesh Dhaniram =

Guyanese cricketer (born 1967)

Personal information
- Born: 14 January 1967 (age 59); Port Mourant, Berbice, Guyana
- Batting: Right-handed
- Bowling: Right-arm offbreak

International information
- National side: United States

Domestic team information
- Years: Team
- 1986/87–1996/97: Guyana
- 1986/87–1988/89: Berbice

Career statistics
Competition	FC	LA	T20
Matches	46	37	3
Runs scored	2,040	667	6
Batting average	29.14	19.61	3.00
100s/50s	4/10	0/2	0/0
Top score	131	63*	4
Balls bowled	398	233	72
Wickets	4	8	1
Bowling average	60.75	21.87	62.00
5 wickets in innings	0	0	0
10 wickets in match	0	0	0
Best bowling	2/55	3/29	1/12
Catches/stumpings	22/–	7/–	1/–
- Source: CricketArchive, 23 January 2011

Sudesh Dhaniram (born 14 January 1967) is a Guyanese cricketer who formerly represented Guyana and most recently, the United States of America. He is a right-handed batsman and a right-arm off break bowler. He made his Twenty20 debut on 9 February 2010, for the United States in the 2010 ICC World Twenty20 Qualifier in the United Arab Emirates. His brother, Sunil also played for Guyana, and had a very successful career with Canada. He faced off against his brother in Canada vs USA matches a few times.

In February 2020, he was named in the West Indies' squad for the Over-50s Cricket World Cup in South Africa. However, the tournament was cancelled during the third round of matches due to the coronavirus pandemic.
