= Mohsin Mulla =

Indian-born Canadian cricketer (born 1981)

Cricket information
- Batting: Right-handed
- Bowling: Right-arm medium

Career statistics
Competition	ODI
Matches	1
Runs scored	1
Batting average	1.00
100s/50s	0/0
Top score	1
Balls bowled	60
Wickets	0
Bowling average	–
5 wickets in innings	–
10 wickets in match	–
Best bowling	–
Catches/stumpings	0/–
- Source: ESPNcricinfo

Mohsin Mulla (born 7 November 1981) is an Indian-born Canadian cricketer. He made his ODI debut in a game against the Netherlands at Toronto in July 2007 and is the second member of his family to play for Canada, his brother Asif Mulla being the other.
