= Asif Mulla =

Indian-born Canadian cricketer (born 1980)

Personal information
- Full name: Asif Abdulhai Mulla
- Born: 5 May 1980 (age 46); Navsari, Gujarat, India
- Nickname: Aloka
- Batting: Right-handed
- Role: Occasional wicket-keeper
- Relatives: Mohsin Mulla (brother)

International information
- National side: Canada (2006-2009)
- ODI debut (cap 43): 26 November 2006 v Netherlands
- Last ODI: 8 July 2009 v Scotland
- T20I debut (cap 18): 10 October 2008 v Pakistan
- Last T20I: 13 October 2008 v Zimbabwe

Career statistics
Competition	ODI	T20I	FC	LA
Matches	24	4	9	36
Runs scored	482	11	317	665
Batting average	20.08	2.75	18.64	19.00
100s/50s	0/1	0/0	0/1	0/2
Top score	58	8	87	66
Catches/stumpings	9/5	1/2	30/4	13/7
- Source: ESPNcricinfo, 5 January 2010

Asif Abdulhai Mulla (Note: His first name is commonly spelt Asif, but his passport spells it Ashif "Archived copy". Archived from the original on 28 September 2007.. The former spelling is used by the Canadian Cricket Association website and CricketArchive, and the latter by ESPNcricinfo.) (born 5 May 1980) is an Indian-born Canadian cricketer. He is a right-handed batsman and a Wicket-keeper.

He made his One Day International debut for Canada in Potchefstroom against the Netherlands in 2006–07, although he had previously played for the USA's under 16 side.

Asif Mulla was the fourth batsman to be dismissed on a duck in the first ball of the innings of a T20I and was also the first batsman to be dismissed on a duck in the first ball of a T20I match when batting first.
