= Ryan Driver =

English cricketer

Personal information
- Full name: Ryan Craig Driver
- Born: 30 April 1979 (age 47); Truro, England
- Batting: Left-handed
- Bowling: Right-arm medium
- Role: All-rounder

Domestic team information
- Years: Team
- 1996–1997: Cornwall
- 1997–2000: Worcestershire
- 2001–2002: Lancashire
- 2003–2007: Cornwall
- First-class debut: 17 September 1998 Worcestershire v Durham
- Last First-class: 25 July 2002 Lancashire v Hampshire
- List A debut: 25 June 1996 Cornwall v Warwickshire
- Last List A: 28 August 2003 Cornwall v Netherlands

Career statistics
Competition	FC	LA
Matches	25	22
Runs scored	686	273
Batting average	18.54	13.65
100s/50s	0/2	0/2
Top score	64	61*
Balls bowled	722	354
Wickets	14	2
Bowling average	29.14	161.50
5 wickets in innings	1	0
10 wickets in match	0	–
Best bowling	5/70	1/17
Catches/stumpings	13/–	1/–
- Source: CricketArchive, 14 August 2010

Ryan Craig Driver (born 30 April 1979) is an English cricketer who played first-class cricket for Worcestershire and Lancashire around the turn of the 21st century. He has captained the Jersey cricket team.

Driver was born in Truro, Cornwall, and made his first List A appearance for his home-county club against Warwickshire in the 1996 NatWest Trophy. It proved a disappointing opening to his career in senior cricket, as he was run out for nought. He also played a few minor games for Cornwall that season, as well as appearing several times for Derbyshire's Second XI and once for Somerset's seconds.

In 1997 he joined Worcestershire, but playing a handful of second-team games whilst also at Durham University, ending his three years of study and cricket as Durham University's Sportsman of the Year. He was also selected for British Universities. 1998 brought him his first-class debut against Durham, making 5 and 0, and had to wait until the middle of 1999 for another chance. In this game, against the New Zealanders, Driver scored 8 and 18, and once more he returned to the seconds. He did, however, play one National League and two County Championship game at the end of the season, his score of note being the 42 he made against Essex.

Driver at last got a run in the Worcestershire side in 2000. In 20 first-class innings he averaged under 24, while in one-day cricket he averaged under 20. He did manage to make his career-best first-class and List A scores within a few days of each other in mid-June: 64 against Sussex in the Championship, then 61 not out against Gloucestershire in the NatWest Trophy; the latter performance won him the man-of-the-match award. 2000 also brought Driver his first wickets both at first-class level (Paul Johnson) and in List A games (Warren Hegg).

For 2001 he moved to Lancashire with the indication of a regular first-team place, and an unbeaten 179 for the seconds in early May was sufficient to give him his opportunity. However, a total of 47 runs in five first-class innings saw him dropped until he hit 222 not out for the second team in late July and was recalled for the Championship match against Glamorgan at Colwyn Bay. In this he made 9 and 2 and that proved to be his last first-class game of the season, although he did make a single Norwich Union League appearance in September. He had never been given the run and chances in the First team that he had been led to believe he would receive.

In 2002 he played only five first-class games, the same as in 2001, and although he hit 25* against Durham UCCE and 56 against Kent he then, in his limited opportunities, scored 1, 5, 5, 16*, 0 and 5. In the one-day game he hit just 30 runs in four innings. He was never to return to the Lancashire side, and he ended a couple of years to forget with overall averages for the county of 14.71 in first-class cricket and a in the one-day format.

After leaving Lancashire, Driver returned to playing for Cornwall (winning the Minor Counties Batsman of the Year award with an average of over 94.3, the award presented by Tom Graveney at Lords) where he continued until 2005, and at this level he had considerably more success with the bat, hitting four centuries in two years in the Minor Counties Championship as well as a number of fifties. He played two List A games in 2003 in the C&G Trophy, the second of these (and Driver's last appearance in senior cricket) coming in Amstelveen against the Netherlands; he made 18 and took the wicket of Tjade Groot. He has also played for Truro Cricket Club, for whom he was Director of Coaching in 2004.

Also in 2005, Driver started work as a teacher at a Jersey school, and played club cricket for an island team, Romerils. He appeared for the Jersey cricket team against Guernsey in the annual insular tournament, and in 2006 was named as coach for Jersey's first competitive international tournament when the island competed in the European Cricket Council Division II Championship in Scotland. Driver was unable to play in the competition himself as he did not satisfy the eligibility criteria, having not been resident in Jersey for long enough, but he qualified in time for the 2008 tournament. In 2009 he was appointed as the Island team's new captain.

In 2010 he resigned to concentrate on playing for Jersey and his club. In July 2010 he was Player of the Tournament at the European Division 1 Championships in Jersey at the competition featuring Scotland A, Ireland A, Netherlands A, Denmark, Italy and Jersey. Driver's contribution helped his side win the Championship for the first time.
