= Jeff Luck =

Namibian cricket umpire (born 1956)

Personal information
- Born: 13 October 1956 (age 70); Cape Town, Cape Province, Union of South Africa

Umpiring information
- ODIs umpired: 3 (2006)
- T20Is umpired: 6 (2010–2022)
- WT20Is umpired: 3 (2022)
- Source: Cricinfo, 10 April 2022

Jeffery James Luck (born 13 October 1956) is a South African-born Namibian cricket umpire. He stood in his first One Day International match, between Canada and the Netherlands, in South Africa on 26 November 2006. His Twenty20 International umpiring debut match, between Afghanistan and Ireland, was in Dubai on 9 February 2010.

In July 2019, Luck won the Administrator of the Year prize at Cricket Namibia's annual awards.

== See also ==
- List of One Day International cricket umpires
- List of Twenty20 International cricket umpires
