= Shahzad Khan =

Canadian cricketer (born 1981)

Personal information
- Full name: Shahzad Afzul Khan
- Born: 20 February 1981 (age 45); Khota, Pakistan
- Batting: Right-handed
- Bowling: Right-arm fast-medium
- Role: Opening batsman

International information
- National side: Canada
- Only ODI (cap 47): 4 July 2007 v Netherlands

Career statistics
Competition	ODI	First-class
Matches	1	1
Runs scored	4	59
Batting average	4.00	29.50
100s/50s	0/0	0/1
Top score	4	55
Balls bowled	–	102
Wickets	–	2
Bowling average	–	36.50
5 wickets in innings	–	0
10 wickets in match	–	0
Best bowling	–	2/36
Catches/stumpings	0/–	0/–
- Source: CricketArchive, 25 July 2009

Shahzad Khan (born 20 February 1981) is a Canadian cricketer. He plays as a batsman, but with the ability to bowl at a fast-medium pace. He made his debut in both first-class cricket and list A cricket for Canada against the Netherlands in the Dutch tour of Canada.
