= Shehzad Ahmed (poet) =

Pakistani poet, writer who won tamgah-e-imtiaz

- Shehzad Ahmed
- Born: April 16, 1932 (age 94); Amritsar, Punjab, British India
- Died: August 1, 2012 (aged 80); Lahore, Pakistan
- Citizenship: Pakistani
- Education: Government College University, Lahore
- Occupations: Poet, writer
- Writing career
- Pen name: Shehzad
- Language: Urdu
- Years active: 1958–2012
- Period: Pakistan military era, Coup d'état
- Genres: Gazal, Nazm
- Subjects: Philosophy, Love, Social
- Notable awards: Pride of Performance

Shehzad Ahmed (Urdu: شہزاد احمد 16 April 1932 – 2 August 2012; sometimes spelled Shahzad Ahmad), was a Pakistani Urdu poet, writer and director of Majlis-e-Taraqqi-e-Adab, an old-book library of Pakistan. Shehzad's poetry collection comprises about thirty books and several other publications on psychology. In the 1990s, he earned national recognition and was awarded Pride of Performance award by the Government of Pakistan. He is also credited with translating non-Urdu poems into Urdu language.

== Early life ==
Shehzad was born in Amritsar, British India on 16 April 1932. He later migrated to Pakistan following the Partition of India. Before his migration, he did matriculation in Amritsar. In 1956, he attended Government College University at Lahore where Shehzad did Master of Science in Psychology, and later in 1958, he did master's degree in Philosophy.

== Literary career ==
Shehzad were initially associated with poetry reading interests. During his collage life, he was reciting poems he used to wrote, and later in 1958 he published his first poetry book titled Sadaf. Later, he continued working on publishing poems. His prominent poems or poetry books include Sadaf, Sitar, Bhujti Ankhain, Jalti, Tuta Huwa Pal, and Utray Meri Khak Per.

During his poetry career, he wrote about ninety Gazals, eleven Nazms and other poetic expressions on different subjects, including religious, social and love.

== Death ==
Shehzad suffered from a health ailment and died in Lahore, Pakistan on 1 August 2012 after his health deteriorated.
