= Amjad Ali (cricketer) =

United Arab Emirates cricketer (born 1979)

Personal information
- Full name: Amjad Ali Chaudhry
- Born: 25 September 1979 (age 47); Lahore, Punjab, Pakistan
- Batting: Left-handed
- Bowling: Right-arm medium
- Role: Wicket-keeper

International information
- National side: UAE
- ODI debut (cap 31): 24 June 2008 v Bangladesh
- Last ODI: 18 November 2015 v Hong Kong

Domestic team information
- Years: Team
- 2002–2003: Lahore Blues

Career statistics
Competition	ODI	T20I	FC	LA
Matches	17	5	15	56
Runs scored	520	42	451	1,529
Batting average	31.00	10.50	22.25	28.84
100s/50s	0/5	0/0	0/3	1/8
Top score	98	20	55	116*
Catches/stumpings	11/1	1/0	21/2	37/8
- Source: CricketArchive, 2 November 2025

Amjad Ali (Urdu: امجد علی; born 25 September 1979) is a Pakistani-born cricketer who played for the United Arab Emirates national cricket team. A left-handed wicket-keeper-batsman, and a right-arm medium pace bowler, he made his One Day International (ODI) debut for the UAE against Bangladesh on 24 June 2008. He previously played first-class cricket for Lahore Blues in Pakistan, and has also played first-class cricket for the UAE in the ICC Intercontinental Cup.

== Biography ==
Born in Lahore in 1979, Chaudhry first played for the Lahore Blues in the Quaid-e-Azam Trophy in 2002. He played twice that season, and once more in 2003, ending his first-class career in Pakistan, though he did play in a minor tournament for Lahore East Zone Blues later in 2003.

He first played for the UAE in a 2007–08 ICC Intercontinental Cup match against Namibia in January 2008, and went on to play three more matches in that tournament. He played two ODIs for his adopted country in the 2008 Asia Cup and most recently represented them in the 2008 ACC Trophy Elite tournament.
