= Surendra Seeraj =

Canadian cricketer (born 1973)

Cricket information
- Batting: Right-handed

Career statistics
Competition	ODI
Matches	1
Runs scored	13
Batting average	–
100s/50s	0/0
Top score	13*
Catches/stumpings	2/–
- Source: CricketArchive, 19 April 2007

Surendra Seeraj (born 7 September 1973) is a Canadian cricket player. He is a right-handed batsman. He has played two matches for Canada, making his debut in the One Day International against Bermuda on 21 August 2006 and also playing in the ICC Americas Championship game against the USA shortly afterwards. He was born at Guelph, Ontario.
