= Imran Awan (cricketer) =

American cricketer (born 1979)

Personal information
- Full name: Imran Pervez Awan
- Born: 2 June 1979 (age 47); Sialkot, Punjab, Pakistan
- Batting: Right-handed
- Bowling: Right-arm fast-medium
- Role: Bowler

Career statistics
Competition	List A	Twenty20
Matches	8	5
Runs scored	48	1
Batting average	9.60	1.00
100s/50s	0/0	0/0
Top score	30	1
Balls bowled	300	96
Wickets	10	2
Bowling average	30.30	53.50
5 wickets in innings	0	0
10 wickets in match	0	0
Best bowling	4/46	2/16
Catches/stumpings	3/–	2/–
- Source: CricketArchive, 2 November 2025

Imran Pervez Awan (born 2 June 1979) is a Pakistani born American cricketer. A right-handed batsman and right-arm fast-medium bowler, he has played for the United States national cricket team.

== Biography ==
Born in Sialkot in 1979, Imran Awan first played for the US in 2000, touring England. He did not play again until the 2005 ICC Trophy in Ireland. After playing in warm-up matches against the Northern Cricket Union President's XI and Namibia he played five matches in the tournament proper. He took 4/46 against Papua New Guinea, his best List A bowling performance.

In 2006, he played in the ICC Americas Championship in King City, Ontario, and most recently represented his country in Division Five of the World Cricket League in Jersey in 2008. He made his Twenty20 debut on 11 February 2010, for the United States in the 2010 ICC World Twenty20 Qualifier in the United Arab Emirates.
