= Prithu Baskota =

Nepalese cricketer

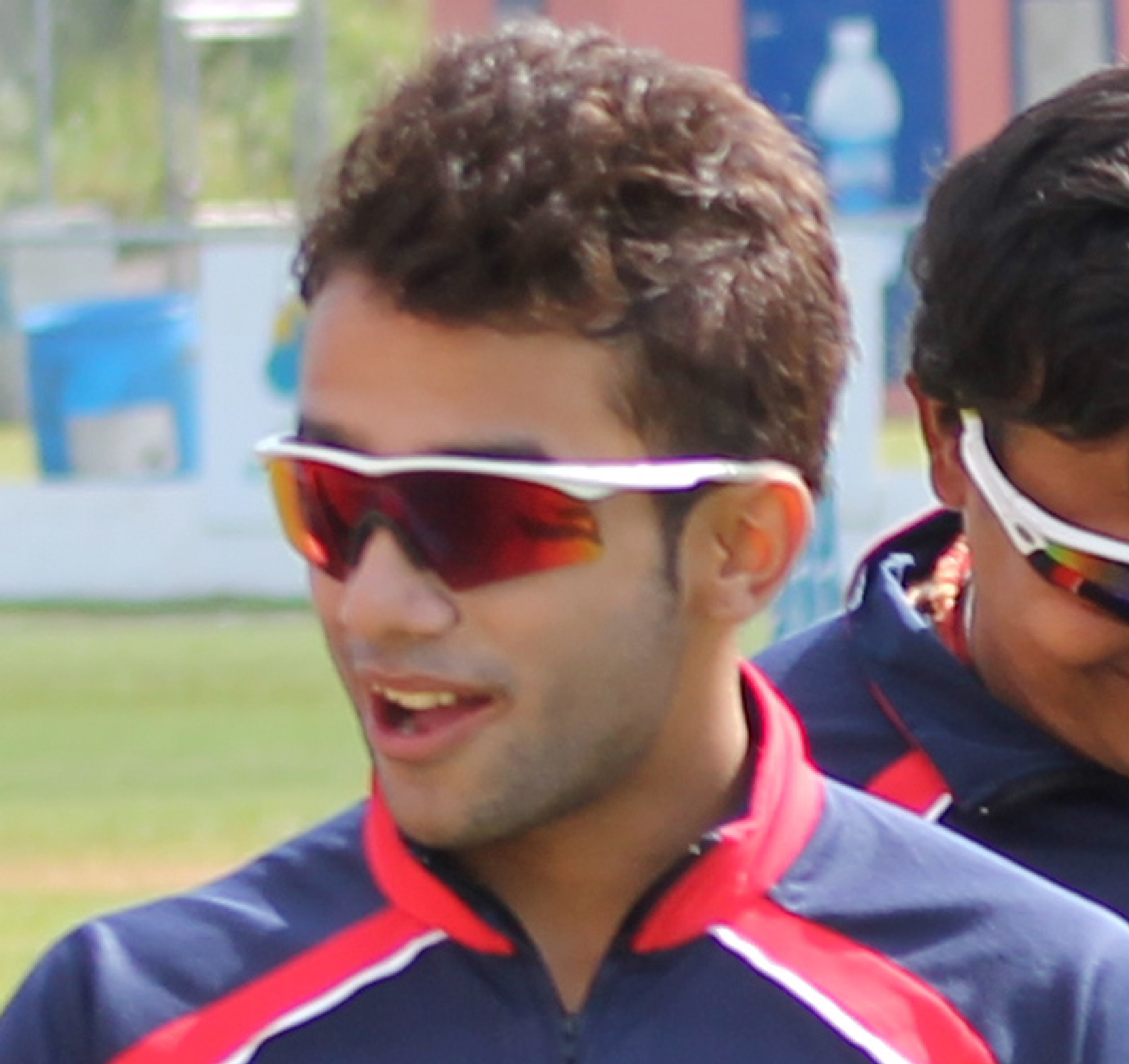

Personal information
- Born: 5 July 1992 (age 34); Nepal
- Nickname: Chhota Don and Paddy
- Batting: Right-handed
- Bowling: Right-arm off break
- Role: All-rounder

International information
- National side: Nepal

Domestic team information
- Years: Team
- 2011–2015: APF (National League)
- 2015–2015: GoldenGate (SPA Cup)
- 2017–2018: Chitwan Tigers (EPL)

Career statistics
Competition	LA	T20	Y ODI
Matches	6	9	6
Runs scored	112	83	49
Batting average	22.40	20.75	8.16
100s/50s	0/1	0/0	0/0
Top score	59*	36*	20
Balls bowled	84	13	294
Wickets	1	2	6
Bowling average	88.00	2.00	26.83
5 wickets in innings	0	0	0
10 wickets in match	0	0	0
Best bowling	1/19	2/4	2/14
Catches/stumpings	2/–	4/–	5/–
- Source: CricketArchive, 1 August 2015

Prithu Baskota (Nepali: पृथु बाँसकोटा) (born 5 July 1992) is a Nepalese cricketer. All-rounder Prithu is a right-handed batsman and a right-arm off break bowler. He made his debut for Nepal against Maldives in November 2010.

He represents the APF Club of the National League and GoldenGate International College, which plays in the SPA Cup.

== Playing career ==
Baskota was selected as part of Nepal's fourteen-man squad for the 2012 World Twenty20 Qualifier in the United Arab Emirates, and made his Twenty20 debut during the tournament against Hong Kong. He made eight further appearances during the tournament, with his final appearance coming against Papua New Guinea. In the nine matches he played in the tournament, Baskota scored 83 runs, at an average of 20.75, with a high score of 36 not out. With the ball, he took two wickets. Nepal finished the tournament in the seventh place, therefore failing to qualify for the 2012 World Twenty20.

Later in 2012, Baskota was selected as part of the Nepal Under-19s squad for the Under-19 World Cup in Australia, where he made six Youth One Day International appearances during the tournament. In August 2012, he was selected in Nepal's fourteen-man squad for the World Cricket League Division Four in Malaysia.

He played for Upchurch Cricket Club, a cricket club in England, in Kent Cricket League Division 2 in July 2015. He scored an unbeaten 146 runs off 125 balls in a match against Gravesend Cricket Club and picked up 2 wickets. Baskota was subsequently selected in Nepal's squad for the 2015–17 ICC World Cricket League Championship's matches against Scotland.

In January 2021, he was named in the Bagmati Province's squad for the 2021 Prime Minister Cup. He was the highest run-scorer in the tournament, securing 215 runs.
