= Lennox Cush =

West Indian cricketer

Personal information
- Full name: Lennox Joseph Cush
- Born: 12 December 1974 (age 51); Georgetown, Guyana
- Batting: Right-handed
- Bowling: Right-arm off break

International information
- National side: United States (2009/10)

Domestic team information
- Years: Team
- 1995/96–2010/11: Guyana

Career statistics
Competition	FC	LA	T20
Matches	38	28	18
Runs scored	1,249	488	158
Batting average	20.81	21.21	15.80
100s/50s	2/2	0/2	0/0
Top score	154	70	49
Balls bowled	2,640	1,209	402
Wickets	26	25	23
Bowling average	42.30	31.00	19.78
5 wickets in innings	0	0	0
10 wickets in match	0	0	0
Best bowling	4/57	4/33	4/25
Catches/stumpings	12/–	7/–	2/–
- Source: CricketArchive, 27 January 2025

Lennox Joseph Cush (born 12 December 1974) is a Guyanese cricketer who played for Guyana and represented the United States.

== Career ==
Cush is an all-rounder who played in 38 first class matches for Guyana, scoring 1,249 runs at an average of 20.81 and taking 26 wickets. He is a right-handed middle order batsman and a right arm off-break bowler.

He made his debut for the United States during 2006 ICC Americas Championship. His all-round performance against Argentina won him the Player of the Match award; he scored 73 runs and took 2 wickets for 30 runs.

During the 2010 Caribbean Twenty20 season, Cush was the leading wicket taker, taking 11 wickets at an average of 12.45.
