= Durand Soraine =

Indian-born Canadian cricketer (born 1983)

Cricket information
- Batting: Right-handed
- Bowling: Right-arm medium

Career statistics
Competition	ODI
Matches	1
Runs scored	5
Batting average	5
100s/50s	0/0
Top score	5
Catches/stumpings	0/–
- Source: CricInfo, 19 April 2007

Durand Soraine (born 11 September 1983) is an Indian-born Canadian cricket player. He is a right-handed batsman and right arm medium pace bowler. He made his senior debut for Canada in the ICC Americas Championship One Day International against Bermuda on 21 August 2006, and went on to play for them in the remaining matches in the tournament. He played for the Canada Under 19 team in the 2004 World Cup.
