= Shahzad Ahmed =

Bahraini cricketer (born 1978)

Personal information
- Born: 10 October 1978 (age 48)

International information
- National side: Bahrain
- Source: Cricinfo, 15 July 2015

Shahzad Ahmed (born 10 October 1978) is a cricketer who played for the Bahrain national cricket team. He played in the 2013 ICC World Cricket League Division Six tournament.
