= Steven Welsh =

Canadian cricketer (born 1974)

Cricket information
- Batting: Right-handed
- Bowling: Right-arm medium-fast

International information
- National side: Canada (2003–2008)
- ODI debut (cap 42): 21 August 2006 v Bermuda
- Last ODI: 28 June 2008 v Bermuda
- Only T20I (cap 13): 5 August 2008 v Bermuda
- Source: ESPNCricinfo, 28 April 2020

Steven Welsh (born 16 March 1974) is a Canadian cricket player. He is a right-handed batsman and a right arm medium-fast bowler. He made his debut for Canada in the ICC Americas Championship One Day International against Bermuda on 21 August 2006 and went on to play in the remainder of the matches in the tournament.

He was strangely left out of the Canadian 2007 World Cup squad despite some impressive performances leading up to the tournament. He currently plays club cricket for Meraloma Athletic Club in Vancouver, BC, Canada.
