= Opperman (disambiguation) =

Opperman or Oppermann may refer to:

== People ==
- Ashley Opperman (born 1983), South African footballer
- Chris Opperman (born 1978), American composer
- Daniel Opperman ("Rooi" Daniel, D.J.E.), Boer commander in Second Boer War
- D. J. Opperman (1914–1985), Afrikaans poet
- Dwight D. Opperman, American businessman
- Frank Opperman (South African actor) (born 1960), South African actor
- George Opperman (1935–1985), graphic artist
- Guy Opperman (born 1965), British politician
- Sir Hubert Opperman (1904–1996), Australian cycling champion, politician and diplomat
- Ian Opperman (born 1989), Namibian cricketer
- Ian James Oppermann, Australian engineer
- Jan Opperman (1939–1997), American racecar driver
- Kalmen Opperman (1919–2010), American clarinetist
- Rüdiger Oppermann (born 1954), German harpist
- Thomas Oppermann (1954–2020), German politician

== Places ==
- Opperman, Ohio

== Mathematics ==
- Oppermann's conjecture

== Organisations ==
- Opperman, English tractor manufacturer
- Oppermann Automobiles, English car manufacturer

== Legal cases ==
- South Dakota v. Opperman

== Literature ==
- The Oppermanns, a 1933 novel by Lion Feuchtwanger
