= 2011 Europe Twenty20 Division Three =

2011 ICC European T20 Championship Division Three
- Administrator: International Cricket Council
- Cricket format: Twenty20
- Tournament format: Round-robin
- Host(s): Slovenia and Austria
- Participants: 6
- Matches: 15
- Most runs: (Estonia) Oliver Slobodetsky (183)
- Most wickets: (Czech Republic) Scott Page (12)
- Official website: ICC European Championship

The 2011 ICC European Twenty20 Championship Division Three is a cricket tournament that took place between 11 and 14 May 2011. It forms part of the European Cricket Championship. Slovenia and Austria hosted the event.

== Teams ==
Teams that qualified are as follows:

- Bulgaria
- Czech Republic
- Estonia
- Slovenia
- Sweden
- Turkey

== Squads ==
Bulgaria	Czech Republic	Estonia
Saif-ur-Rehman (C); Stuart Clarkson; Ivan Dimitrov; Ivaylo Dunchev; Mohamad Hanif; Amal John; Ivaylo Katzarski; Mushtaq Lone; Prakash Mishra; Vladimir Ruskov; Danail Trenev; Georgi Velinov; Lyubomir Zanev (Wk)	Scott Page (C); Sunil Ambar; Hugo Banks; John Corness; Sivagnanam Gnanatheeswaran; Craig Hampson; Vojtech Hasa; Damian Kysely; Brigmam Smith; Benjamin Soucek; Mikulas Stary (Wk); Alexander Storek; Jobi Thevupura Samuel	Sivalingham Arunachalam (C); Andres Burget; Vineeth Govind; Marten Kundla; Murali Obili; Anil Puri (Wk); Moshiur Rahman; Nand Lal Riar; Oliver Slobodetsky; Mart Tammoja; Marko Vaik; Kalle Vilslapuu

Slovenia	Sweden	Turkey
Tom Furness (C); Urban Blaznik; Rok Bohinc (Wk); Domen Bohinc; Robert Crawford; Bradley Eve; Lalantha Karunatilake; Simon Kaučič; Stephen Mayland; Mark Oman; Blaž Praper; Primož Pustoslemšek; Nejc Zupan	Imran Amjad(C); Serge Conein; Sanaullah Habibzai; Azam Khalil; Maqsood Kawaja; Azam Mohammad; Shahid Mustafa; Ewan Prezens; Piyal Rahman; Sunny Sharma; Sadat Sidiqi (Wk); Bilal Zaigham; Hassan Zaigham	Muhammad Aasim (C) (Wk); Muneer Ahmed; Salman Ali; Sajjad Haider; Mubashir Khan; Nabeel Munir; Abdullah Numan; Mohammad Razak; Huseyin Sen; Imran Sharif; Ali Turkmen; Mecit Turkmenoglu; Hammad-ul-Haq

== Fixtures ==
=== Group stage ===
==== Points Table ====
Team	P	W	L	T	NR	Points	NRR
Sweden	5	5	0	0	0	10	+4.78
Estonia	5	3	2	0	0	6	+0.19
Slovenia	5	2	3	0	0	4	–0.15
Czech Republic	5	2	3	0	0	4	–0.43
Turkey	5	2	3	0	0	4	–2.36
Bulgaria	5	1	4	0	0	2	–1.12

==== Matches ====
11 May
10.00 a.m.
Scorecard

Bulgaria; 99/9 (20 overs)	v	Czech Republic; 95 (20 overs)
Stuart Clarkson 41 (48); Scott Page 4/14 (4 overs)		Brigmam Smith 31 (21); Prakash Mishra 3/15 (4 overs)

Bulgaria won by 4 runs
Ljubljana Cricket Club, Valburga

- Bulgaria won the toss and elected to bat.

11 May
10 a.m.
Scorecard

Estonia; 236/8 (20 overs)	v	Slovenia; 172 (20 overs)
Timothy Heath 113 (45); Simon Kaučič 4/37 (4 overs)		Lalantha Karunatilake 37 (20); Sivalingham Arunachalam 4/29 (4 overs)

Estonia won by 64 runs
Cricket Club Velden 91, Velden
Umpires: Kamran Sadiq (Nor) and Jari Schlabel (Fin)

- Estonia won the toss and elected to bat.

11 May
03.30 p.m.
Scorecard

Sweden; 229/3 (20 overs)	v	Estonia; 93 (16.3 overs)
Bilal Zaigham 70 (49); Murali Obili 1/36 (4 overs)		Timothy Heath 20 (16); Azam Khalil 3/18 (4 overs)

Sweden won by 136 runs
Ljubljana Cricket Club, Valburga
Umpires: Jane Carpenter (Jer) and Manzoor Nazar (Nor)

- Sweden won the toss and elected to bat.

11 May
03.30 p.m.
Scorecard

Turkey; 86 (18 overs)	v	Slovenia; 87/0 (8 overs)
Hammad-ul-Haq 16 (27); Mark Oman 3/13 (4 overs)		Lalantha Karunatilake 44* (27)

Slovenia won by 10 wickets
Cricket Club Velden 91, Velden
Umpires: Jari Schalbel (Fin) and Dermot Ward (Ire)

- Turkey won the toss and elected to bat.

12 May
10.00 a.m.
Scorecard

Estonia; 100 (18 overs)	v	Czech Republic; 101/4 (17 overs)
Moshiur Rahman 29* (14); Scott Page 3/19 (3 overs)		Mikulas Stary 33* (26); Vineeth Govind 2/21 (4 overs)

Czech Republic won by 6 wickets
Ljubljana Cricket Club, Valburga
Umpires: Dave Bray (Gue) and Kamran Sadiq (Nor)

- Estonia won the toss and elected to bat.

12 May
10.00 a.m.
Scorecard

Turkey; 93/9 (20 overs)	v	Sweden; 96/2 (10.2 overs)
Muhammad Aasim 20 (22); Ewan Prezens 3/11 (4 overs)		Sunny Sharma 41 (29); Nabeel Munir 2/9 (2 overs)

Sweden won by 8 wickets
Cricket Club Velden 91, Velden
Umpires: Manzoor Nazar (Nor) and Dermot Ward (Ire)

- Sweden won the toss and elected to field.

12 May
03.30 p.m.
Scorecard

Bulgaria; 100/7 (20 overs)	v	Turkey; 102/7 (19.3 overs)
Prakash Mishra 21 (19); Mohammad Razak 2/18 (4 overs)		Nabeel Munir 39 (38); Prakash Mishra 2/14 (4 overs)

Turkey won by 3 wickets
Ljubljana Cricket Club, Valburga
Umpires: Kamran Sadiq (Nor) and Jari Schlabel (Fin)

- Bulgaria won the toss and elected to bat.

12 May
03.30 p.m.
Scorecard

Slovenia; 120/8 (20 overs)	v	Sweden; 122/6 (17.5 overs)
Thomas Furness 35* (53); Aman Zahid 3/24 (4 overs)		Sanaullah Habibzai 29 (21); Simon Kaučič 2/21 (3.5 overs)

Sweden won by 4 wickets
Cricket Club Velden 91, Velden
Umpires: Jane Carpenter (Jer) and Dermot Ward (Ire)

- Slovenia won the toss and elected to bat.

13 May
10.00 a.m.
Scorecard

Bulgaria; 121/8 (20 overs)	v	Estonia; 124/1 (15.4 overs)
Stuart Clarkson 36 (48); Timothy Heath 3/21 (4 overs)		Oliver Slobodetsky 65 (51); Saif-ur-Rehman 1/22 (4 overs)

Estonia won by 9 wickets
Ljubljana Cricket Club, Valburga
Umpires: Dermot Ward (Ire) and Jari Schlabel (Fin)

- Bulgaria won the toss and elected to bat.

13 May
10.00 a.m.
Scorecard

Czech Republic; 129/9 (20 overs)	v	Turkey; 133/7 (20 overs)
Vojtech Hasa 38 (38); Mecit Turkmenoglu 2/14 (3 overs)		Nabeel Munir 39* (41); Scott Page 2/12 (2 overs)

Turkey won by 3 wickets
Cricket Club Velden 91, Velden
Umpires: Dave Bray (Gue) and Kamran Sadiq (Nor)

- Turkey won the toss and elected to field.

13 May
03.30 p.m.
Scorecard

Bulgaria; 107/7 (20 overs)	v	Slovenia; 108/4 (19.1 overs)
Vladimir Ruskov 34 (37); Primož Pustoslemšek 3/12 (4 overs)		Mark Oman 39* (64); Mohamad Hanif 3/33 (4 overs)

Slovenia won by 6 wickets
Ljubljana Cricket Club, Valburga
Umpires: Jane Carpenter (Jer) and Jari Schlabel (Fin)

- Slovenia won the toss and elected to field.

13 May
03.30 p.m.
Scorecard

Czech Republic; 65 (13.3 overs)	v	Sweden; 70/2 (7.5 overs)
Sivagnanam Gnanatheeswaran 12 (10); Imran Amjad 4/15 (3.3 overs)		Sadat Sidiqi 27* (17); Benjamin Soucek 1/11 (1 overs)

Sweden won by 8 wickets
Cricket Club Velden 91, Velden
Umpires: Kamran Sadiq (Nor) and Manzoor Nazar (Nor)

- Czech Republic won the toss and elected to bat.

14 May
10.00 a.m.
Scorecard

Bulgaria; 50 (12.4 overs)	v	Sweden; 51/0 (7.1 overs)
Lyubomir Zanev 6 (4); Serge Conein 4/21 (4 overs)		Azam Mohammad 26* (20)

Sweden won by 10 wickets
Ljubljana Cricket Club, Valburga
Umpires: Jane Carpenter (Jer) and Jari Schlabel (Fin)

- Bulgaria won the toss and elected to bat.

14 May
10.00 a.m.
Scorecard

Estonia; 176/2 (20 overs)	v	Turkey; 98 (20 overs)
Oliver Slobodetsky 73* (54); Sajjad Haider 2/33 (4 overs)		Salman Ali 20 (11); Murali Obili 3/16

Estonia won by 78 runs
Cricket Club Velden 91, Velden
Umpires: Dermot Ward (Ire) and Kamran Sadiq (Nor)

- Estonia won the toss and elected to bat.

14 May
03.30 p.m.
Scorecard

Czech Republic; 128/5 (20 overs)	v	Slovenia; 105/8 (20 overs)
Mikulas Stary 29 (24); Primož Pustoslemšek 3/24 (4 overs)		Mark Oman 37 (52); Jobi Thevupura Samuel 2/8 (2 overs)

Czech Republic won by 23 runs
Ljubljana Cricket Club, Valburga

- Czech Republic won the toss and elected to bat.

== Statistics ==
=== Highest team totals ===
The following table lists the six highest team scores.

Team	Total	Opponent	Ground
Estonia	236/8	Slovenia	Cricket Club Velden 91, Velden
Sweden	229/3	Estonia	Ljubljana Cricket Club, Valburga
Estonia	176/2	Turkey	Cricket Club Velden 91, Velden
Slovenia	172	Estonia	Cricket Club Velden 91, Velden
Turkey	133/7	Czech Republic	Cricket Club Velden 91, Velden
Czech Republic	129/9	Turkey	Cricket Club Velden 91, Velden

=== Most runs ===
The top five highest run scorers (total runs) are included in this table.

Player	Team	Runs	Inns	Avg	S/R	HS	100s	50s	4s	6s
Oliver Slobodetsky	Estonia	183	5	61.00	130.71	73*	0	2	22	2
Bilal Zaigham	Sweden	155	5	38.75	104.20	70	0	1	14	1
Mark Oman	Slovenia	150	5	50.00	85.22	39*	0	0	19	1
Timothy Heath	Estonia	144	5	36.00	189.47	113	1	0	17	9
Nand Lal Riar	Estonia	140	5	28.00	111.11	46	0	0	21	2

=== Highest scores ===
This table contains the top five highest scores made by a batsman in a single innings.

Player	Team	Score	Balls	4s	6s	Opponent	Ground
Timothy Heath	Estonia	113	45	13	8	Slovenia	Cricket Club Velden 91, Velden
Oliver Slobodetsky	Estonia	73*	54	7	1	Turkey	Cricket Club Velden 91, Velden
Bilal Zaigham	Sweden	70	49	5	1	Estonia	Ljubljana Cricket Club, Valburga
Oliver Slobodetsky	Estonia	65*	51	8	1	Bulgaria	Ljubljana Cricket Club, Valburga
Sunny Sharma	Sweden	64	39	6	2	Estonia	Ljubljana Cricket Club, Valburga

=== Most wickets ===
The following table contains the five leading wicket-takers.

Player	Team	Wkts	Mts	Ave	S/R	Econ	BBI
Scott Page	Czech Republic	12	5	6.50	7.5	5.20	4/14
Azam Khalil	Sweden	11	5	6.36	10.3	3.68	3/8
Aman Zahid	Sweden	11	5	9.00	9.8	5.50	3/24
Simon Kaučič	Slovenia	8	5	11.00	9.0	7.33	4/37
Sivalingham Arunachalam	Estonia	7	5	17.1	16.86	5.90	4/29

=== Best bowling figures ===
This table lists the top five players with the best bowling figures.

Player	Team	Overs	Figures	Opponent	Ground
Scott Page	Czech Republic	4.0	4/14	Bulgaria	Ljunljana Cricket Club, Valburga
Imran Amjad	Sweden	3.3	4/15	Czech Republic	Cricket Club Velden 91, Velden
Serge Conein	Sweden	4.0	4/21	Bulgaria	Ljubljana Cricket Club, Valburga
Sivalingham Arunachalam	Estonia	4.0	4/29	Slovenia	Cricket Club Velden 91, Velden
Simon Kaučič	Slovenia	4.0	4/37	Estonia	Cricket Club Velden 91, Velden

== See also ==
- 2012 ICC World Twenty20 Qualifier
- European Cricket Championship
