= Li Kai Ming =

Hong Kong cricketer

Personal information
- Full name: Li Kai Ming
- Born: 5 July 1991 (age 35); Hong Kong
- Batting: Right-handed
- Bowling: Leg break
- Role: Bowler

International information
- National side: Hong Kong

Domestic team information
- Years: Team
- 2015: Sydney Sixers

Career statistics
Competition	Twenty20
Matches	2
Runs scored	–
Batting average	–
100s/50s	–/–
Top score	–
Balls bowled	36
Wickets	1
Bowling average	40.00
5 wickets in innings	–
10 wickets in match	–
Best bowling	1/26
Catches/stumpings	–/–
- Source: Cricinfo, 26 August 2012

Li Kai Ming (born 5 July 1991) is a Hong Kong cricketer who made his debut for the Hong Kong national team at the 2010 Asian Games. He is a right-handed batsman who bowls leg break.

Li Kai Ming made his debut for Hong Kong in the cricket tournament at the 2010 Asian Games, playing in a single match against the Maldives. He was later selected as part of Hong Kong's fourteen man squad for the World Twenty20 Qualifier in the United Arab Emirates, making his Twenty20 debut during the tournament against Afghanistan, where he wasn't required to bat and bowled two wicketless overs which conceded 14 runs, with Afghanistan winning the match by 9 wickets. He made a second appearance in the tournament against the United States, where again he was not required to bat, but did take the wicket of Usman Shuja to finish with figures of 1/26 from four overs, with Hong Kong winning by 77 runs. Hong Kong finished the tournament in eleventh place, therefore failing to qualify for the 2012 World Twenty20.

On 23 November 2015, the Sydney Sixers announced that they have signed Li as a community rookie for the 2015–16 Big Bash League season.
