= 2012 World Twenty20 Qualifier =

2012 ICC World Twenty20 Qualifier
- Dates: 13 – 24 March 2012
- Administrator: International Cricket Council
- Cricket format: Twenty20 and Twenty20 International
- Tournament format(s): Group Stage and Playoffs
- Host: United Arab Emirates
- Champions: Ireland (2nd title)
- Participants: 16
- Matches: 72
- Player of the series: (Namibia) Raymond van Schoor
- Most runs: (Ireland) Paul Stirling (357 runs)
- Most wickets: (Afghanistan) Dawlat Zadran, (Scotland) Majid Haq (17 wickets each)
- Official website: Official website

The 2012 ICC World Twenty20 Qualifier was played in early 2012 as a part of the ICC World Twenty20 Qualifier series. This edition of the qualifier for the 2012 ICC World Twenty20 was an expanded version comprising ten qualifiers from regional Twenty20 tournaments, in addition to the six ODI/Twenty20 status countries. It was staged in the UAE.

ICC Associate and Affiliate Members from around the globe had the opportunity to qualify for the 2012 ICC World Twenty20 in Sri Lanka. Regional qualifying events were held in the five regions to provide a qualifying pathway to the 16-team qualifier which took place in early 2012 in the United Arab Emirates. The six Associate/Affiliate Members with ODI status – Afghanistan, Canada, Ireland, Kenya, Netherlands and Scotland – have automatically qualified for this event.

Three teams from the Asia region, two teams from Africa, Americas and Europe, and one team from East Asia-Pacific had the opportunity to qualify for the ICC World Twenty20 2012 global qualifier. Some ODI status Associate/Affiliate sides took part in these qualifying events, along with emerging teams from ICC Full Members (e.g., South Africa and Zimbabwe). In such cases, the highest placed Associate and Affiliate sides from these events progressed to the global qualifier, based on the qualifying spots available.

The tournament was won by Ireland, who defeated Afghanistan in the final, in a rematch of the 2010 ICC World Twenty20 Qualifier. Both the teams qualified for the 2012 ICC World Twenty20 in Sri Lanka. Paul Stirling was the highest run-getter with 357 runs including the second-fastest half-century ever in T20I match (17 balls) in the final, while Dawlat Zadran with 17 wickets was the highest wicket-taker. Namibia's Raymond van Schoor was the Player of the Tournament.

== Entrants ==
Qualification for 2012 World Twenty20 Qualifier involves 81 ICC member countries to battle their way from regional Division 3 to Division 1 and eventually World Twenty20 Qualifier. Three of the 81 teams are already qualified but are participating as a part of division members. Pre-qualified teams are Afghanistan, Canada, and Kenya. Zimbabwe A team is involved as a part of Africa Division 1 but as a full member Zimbabwe national cricket team is already qualified for 2012 ICC World Twenty20.

== Regional qualification ==
Africa (ACA)

Date	Event	Venue	Competing Teams	Qualified Team(s)
24–27 Feb 2011	ICC Africa Division 3	Ghana	Cameroon, Gambia, Lesotho, Mali, Morocco, Rwanda, Seychelles	Rwanda
14–18 May 2011	ICC Africa Division 2	South Africa	Ghana, Malawi, Mozambique, Sierra Leone, Swaziland, Tanzania, Nigeria, Botswana, Rwanda	Nigeria, Ghana
9–15 July 2011	ICC Africa Division 1	Entebbe, Uganda	Kenya, Namibia, Uganda, Nigeria, Ghana	Kenya,Namibia, Uganda

Asia (ACC)

Date	Event	Venue	Competing Teams	Qualified Team(s)
1–10 December 2011	ICC ACC T20	Nepal	Afghanistan, Nepal, UAE, Oman, Hong Kong, Malaysia, Bhutan, Kuwait, Maldives, Saudi Arabia	Afghanistan, Hong Kong, Nepal, Oman

Americas (ACA)

Date	Event	Venue	Competing Teams	Qualified Team(s)
14–18 March 2011	ICC Americas Division 3	Costa Rica	Belize, Chile, Peru, Mexico, Costa Rica, Falkland Islands	Belize
9–15 April 2011	ICC Americas Division 2	Suriname	Bahamas, Belize, Brazil, Panama, Suriname, Turks and Caicos Islands	Suriname
17–24 July 2011	ICC Americas Division 1	(United States) Lauderhill, Florida, USA	Argentina, Bermuda, Canada, Cayman Islands, USA, Suriname	United States, Bermuda, Canada

East Asia and Pacific (EAP)

Date	Event	Venue	Competing Teams	Qualified Team(s)
4–8 April 2011	ICC EAP Division 2	Samoa	Indonesia, Samoa, Tonga, Cook Islands, Philippines, South Korea	Samoa
4–7 July 2011	ICC EAP Division 1	Papua New Guinea	Papua New Guinea, Fiji, Japan, Vanuatu, Samoa	Papua New Guinea

Europe (ECC)

Date	Event	Venue	Competing Teams	Qualified Team(s)
11–14 May 2011	ICC Europe Division 3	Slovenia	Bulgaria, Czech Republic, Estonia, Slovenia, Sweden, Turkey	Sweden
20–25 June 2011	ICC Europe Division 2†	Belgium/Netherlands	Austria, Belgium, Cyprus, Finland, Greece(Hellas), Isle of Man, Luxembourg, Malta, Portugal, Spain, Sweden	Austria, Belgium
19–24 July 2011	ICC Europe Division 1	Jersey/Guernsey	Croatia, Denmark, France, Germany, Gibraltar, Guernsey, Israel, Italy, Jersey, Norway, Austria, Belgium	Denmark, Italy

† Switzerland were due to take part, but withdrew due to internal difficulties, and were automatically relegated.

=== Qualified teams ===
The ten qualified teams from regional Twenty20 competitions played in the 2012 World Twenty20 Qualifier along with the six associate teams that had automatically qualified. Originally, after the cut of associates from the ICC Cricket World Cup 2015, it was decided to give associates more of a chance in Twenty20 format and expanded the main tournament to 16 teams with top 6 teams from the Qualifier going to the World Cup but after the re-inclusion of Associates in the 50-Over World Cup in 2015, the earlier format was retained and only the top two teams from this event qualifying for the 2012 ICC World Twenty20.

ACA

- Kenya
- Namibia
- Uganda

ACA

- Bermuda
- Canada
- United States

ACC

- Afghanistan
- Hong Kong
- Nepal
- Oman

EAP

- Papua New Guinea

ECC

- Denmark
- Ireland
- Italy
- Netherlands
- Scotland

== Match officials ==
The International Cricket Council announced the umpires to officiate in the tournament. There were four Regional Match Referees, plus 12 umpires, seven from the Elite Panel (which included Simon Taufel, a five-time ICC Umpire of the Year Award recipient), and also five ICC Associate and Affiliate Panel umpires.

Umpires

- (Pakistan) Ahsan Raza
- (Nepal) Buddhi Pradhan
- (New Zealand) Chris Gaffaney
- (Scotland) Ian Ramage
- (Trinidad and Tobago) Joel Wilson
- (South Africa) Johan Cloete
- (Ireland) Mark Hawthorne
- (Sri Lanka) Ranmore Martinesz
- (Bermuda) Roger Dill
- (Singapore) Sarika Prasad
- (Australia) Simon Taufel
- (India) Sudhir Asnani

Match referees

- (Barbados) Adrian Griffith
- (England) David Jukes
- (South Africa) Dev Govindjee
- (Sri Lanka) Graeme Labrooy

== Format ==
The tournament, held from 13 to 24 March, has 72 qualifying fixtures. The sixteen teams participating in this tournament has been divided into two groups of eight each. The top team from each group will meet in the first qualifying final with the winner being guaranteed a place in the World Twenty20 Cup 2012 to be held in Sri Lanka. The loser of that match will play the second qualifying final against the winner of a series of playoff matches. The winners of both qualifying finals will meet in the final at Dubai.

== Squads ==
Afghanistan	Netherlands	Ireland	Kenya
Nawroz Mangal (c); Karim Sadiq (vc) (wk); Javed Ahmadi; Aftab Alam; Mirwais Ashraf; Izatullah Dawlatzai; Zamir Khan; Mohammad Nabi; Gulbodin Naib; Shabir Noori; Mohammad Shahzad (wk); Samiullah Shenwari; Asghar Afghan; Dawlat Zadran	Peter Borren (c); Wesley Barresi (wk); Mudassar Bukhari; Atse Buurman (wk); Tom Cooper; Tom de Grooth; Tim Gruijters; Timm van der Gugten; Tom Heggelman; Alexei Kervezee; Ahsan Malik; Stephan Myburgh; Pieter Seelaar; Michael Swart	William Porterfield (c); Kevin O'Brien (vc); George Dockrell; Trent Johnston; Nigel Jones; Ed Joyce; Andrew Poynter; Rory McCann (wk); Tim Murtagh; Boyd Rankin; Max Sorensen; Paul Stirling; Andrew White; Gary Wilson (wk)	Collins Obuya (c); Ragheb Aga; Duncan Allan; Tanmay Mishra; James Ngoche; Shem Ngoche; Alex Obanda; David Obuya (wk); Nehemiah Odhiambo; Nelson Odhiambo; Elijah Otieno; Morris Ouma (wk); Rakep Patel (wk); Hiren Varaiya

Canada	Scotland	Namibia	Papua New Guinea
Rizwan Cheema (c); Manny Aulakh; Harvir Baidwan; Rustam Bhatti (wk); Parth Desai; Tyson Gordon; Ruvindu Gunasekera; Jimmy Hansra; Zahid Hussain; Nitish Kumar; Henry Osinde; Hiral Patel; Raza-ur-Rehman; Junaid Siddiqui	Gordon Drummond (c); Richie Berrington; Kyle Coetzer; Ryan Flannigan; Majid Haq; Moneeb Iqbal; Calum MacLeod; Preston Mommsen; Matthew Parker; Safyaan Sharif; Simon Smith (wk); Jan Stander; Craig Wallace (wk); Fraser Watts	Sarel Burger (c); Raymond van Schoor (vc) (wk); Gerhard Erasmus; Hendrik Geldenhuys; Zhivago Groenewald; Louis Klazinga; Ian Opperman; Bernard Scholtz; Nicholaas Scholtz; Gerrie Snyman; Ewald Steenkamp (wk); Christi Viljoen; Louis van der Westhuizen; Craig Williams (wk)	Rarva Dikana (c); Jack Vare (vc) (wk); Chris Amini; Hitolo Areni; Mahuru Dai; Willie Gavera; Geraint Jones (wk); Christopher Kent; Jason Kila; Vani Morea; John Reva; Joel Tom; Tony Ura; Assad Vala

Hong Kong	Bermuda	Italy	Oman
Jamie Atkinson (c); Nizakat Khan (vc); Irfan Ahmed; Waqas Barkat (wk); Munir Dar; Mark Ferguson (wk); Babar Hayat (wk); Aizaz Khan; Courtney Kruger; Roy Lamsam; Li Kai Ming; Daljeet Singh; Kinchit Shah (wk); Max Tucker	David Hemp (c); Jason Anderson (wk); Lionel Cann; Fiqre Crockwell (wk); Terryn Fray; Joshua Gilbert; Stefan Kelly; Kamau Leverock; Steven Outerbridge; Justin Pitcher; Sam Robinson; Dion Stovell; Janeiro Tucker; Rodney Trott	Alessandro Bonora (c); Gareth Berg; Damian Crowley (wk); Dilan Fernando; Damian Fernando; Luis di Giglio; Hemantha Jayasena; Gayashan Munasinghe; Andy Northcote; Hayden Patrizi (wk); Vince Pennazza; Peter Petricola; Carl Sandri; Michael di Venuto	Hemal Mehta (c); Sultan Ahmed (wk); Qais Al Said; Amir Ali; Adnan Ilyas; Aamir Kaleem; Awal Khan; Farhan Khan; Ajay Lalcheta; Sufyan Mehmood (wk); Rajeshkumar Ranpura; Zeeshan Siddiqui; Jatinder Singh; Vaibhav Wategaonkar

Denmark	Nepal	Uganda	United States
Michael Pedersen (c); Aftab Ahmed; Shehzad Ahmed; Sair Anjum; Bobby Chawla; Frederik Klokker (wk); Zameer Khan; Jacob Larsen; Rizwan Mahmood; Kamran Mahmood (wk); James Moniz; Martin Pedersen; Basit Raja; Bashir Shah	Paras Khadka (c); Gyanendra Malla (vc) (wk); Pradeep Airee (wk); Mehboob Alam; Prithu Baskota; Amrit Bhattarai; Shakti Gauchan; Krishna Karki; Paresh Lohani; Anil Mandal; Basanta Regmi; Sanjam Regmi; Chandra Sawad; Sharad Vesawkar	Davis Arinaitwe (c); Arthur Kyobe; Brian Masaba; Deusdedit Muhumuza; Roger Mukasa (wk); Benjamin Musoke; Frank Nsubuga; Jonathan Ssebanja; Asadu Seiga; Lawrence Sematimba (wk); Henry Senyondo; Ronald Ssemanda; Charles Waiswa; Arthur Ziraba (wk)	Sushil Nadkarni (c); Aditya Mishra (vc); Orlando Baker; Adil Bhatti; Ryan Corns; Muhammad Ghous; Elmore Hutchinson; Asif Khan; Andy Mohammed; Nauman Mustafa (wk); Japen Patel; Abhimanyu Rajp; Usman Shuja; Steven Taylor (wk)

== Fixtures and results ==
The groups were announced by the ICC on 21 December 2011. Source:ESPNCricinfo

- All times are given in Arabian Standard Time – GMT+4 (UTC+4)

=== Group A ===
==== Points table ====
Pos	Team	Pld	W	L	T	NR	Pts	NRR	Qualification
1	Afghanistan	7	7	0	0	0	14	1.886	Qualified for the 1st to 6th Place Play-Offs
2	Netherlands	7	6	1	0	0	12	1.671	Qualified for the 1st to 6th Place Play-Offs
3	Canada	7	5	2	0	0	10	0.805	Qualified for the 1st to 6th Place Play-Offs
4	Papua New Guinea	7	3	4	0	0	6	0.045	Qualified for the 7th to 10th Place Play-Offs
5	Nepal	7	3	4	0	0	6	−0.197	Qualified for the 7th to 10th Place Play-Offs
6	Hong Kong	7	2	5	0	0	4	−1.256	Qualified for the 11th to 14th Place Play-Offs
7	Bermuda	7	1	6	0	0	2	−0.990	Qualified for the 11th to 14th Place Play-Offs
8	Denmark	7	1	6	0	0	2	−2.008	Qualified for the 15th Place Play-Off

==== Results ====
13 March
10:00
Scorecard

Papua New Guinea; 112/6 (20 overs)	v	Afghanistan; 113/4 (19 overs)
Christopher Kent 20* (24); Dawlat Zadran 2/20 (4 overs)		Mohammad Nabi 52* (49); Rarua Dikana 2/20 (4 overs)

Afghanistan won by 6 wickets
Dubai International Cricket Stadium, Dubai
Umpires: Sarika Prasad (Sin) and Joel Wilson (WI)
Player of the match: Mohammad Nabi (Afg)

- Afghanistan won the toss and elected to field.
- Points: Afghanistan 2, Papua New Guinea 0.

13 March
14:00
Scorecard

Netherlands; 135/6 (20 overs)	v	Canada; 93 (16.4 overs)
Tom Cooper 29 (25); Harvir Baidwan 3/29 (4 overs)		Jimmy Hansra 30 (31); Pieter Seelaar 3/16 (3 overs)

Netherlands won by 42 runs
Dubai International Cricket Stadium, Dubai
Umpires: Joel Wilson (WI) and Mark Hawthorne (Ire)
Player of the match: Mudassar Bukhari (Ned)

- Netherlands won the toss and elected to bat
- Points: Netherlands 2, Canada 0.

13 March
14:00
Scorecard

Nepal; 130/6 (20 overs)	v	Hong Kong; 102/9 (20 overs)
Paras Khadka 68 (62); Munir Dar 3/15 (4 overs)		Nizakat Khan 32 (27); Chandra Sawad 4/24 (4 overs)

Nepal won by 28 runs
ICC Global Cricket Academy Ground No 2, Dubai
Umpires: Johan Cloete (SA) and Chris Gaffaney (NZ)
Player of the match: Paras Khadka (Nep)

- Nepal won the toss and elected to bat
- Points: Nepal 2, Hong Kong 0.

13 March
14:00
Scorecard

Bermuda; 116/7 (20 overs)	v	Denmark; 117/3 (19.1 overs)
Dion Stovell 56 (52); Sair Anjum 2/15 (2 overs)		Frederik Klokker 50 (41); Dion Stovell 1/20 (4 overs)

Denmark won by 7 wickets
Sharjah Cricket Stadium, Sharjah
Umpires: Buddhi Pradhan (Nep) and Ranmore Martinesz (Sri)
Player of the match: Frederik Klokker (Den)

- Bermuda won the toss and elected to bat
- Points: Denmark 2, Bermuda 0.

14 March
10:00
Scorecard

Canada; 167/5 (20 overs)	v	Papua New Guinea; 161/3 (20 overs)
Nitish Kumar 57 (44); Rarua Dikana 1/21 (3 overs)		Assad Vala 52 (48); Hiral Patel 1/16 (2 overs)

Canada won by 6 runs
ICC Global Cricket Academy, Dubai
Umpires: Chris Gaffaney (NZ) and Sarika Prasad (Sin)
Player of the match: Nitish Kumar (Can)

- Canada won the toss and elected to bat
- Points: Canada 2, Papua New Guinea 0.

14 March
10:00
Scorecard

Bermuda; 161/5 (20 overs)	v	Hong Kong; 164/2 (17.3 overs)
David Hemp 43 (43); Munir Dar 2/33 (3 overs)		Jamie Atkinson 87* (55); Kamau Leverock 1/25 (2.3 overs)

Hong Kong won by 8 wickets
ICC Global Cricket Academy Ground No 2, Dubai
Umpires: Ranmore Martinesz (Sri) and Ian Ramage (Sco)
Player of the match: Jamie Atkinson (Hkg)

- Bermuda won the toss and elected to bat
- Points: Hong Kong 2, Bermuda 0.

14 March
14:00
Scorecard

Netherlands; 149/6 (20 Overs)	v	Afghanistan; 150/6 (19.4 Overs)
Alexei Kervezee 58* (43); Izatullah Dawlatzai 3/33 (4 overs)		Mohammad Shahzad 54 (44); Mudassar Bukhari 2/12 (2 overs)

Afghanistan won by 4 wickets.
Dubai International Cricket Stadium, Dubai
Umpires: Simon Taufel (Aus) and Johan Cloete (SA)
Player of the match: Mohammad Shahzad (Afg)

- Netherlands won the toss and chose to bat.
- Points: Afghanistan 2, Netherlands 0

14 March
14:00
Scorecard

Denmark; 82 (19.1 overs)	v	Nepal; 85/1 (12.4 overs)
Frederik Klokker 21 (27); Shakti Gauchan 4/20 (4 overs)		Pradeep Airee 65* (43); Sair Anjum 1/14 (3 overs)

Nepal won by 9 wickets.
ICC Global Cricket Academy, Dubai
Umpires: Sarika Prasad (Sin) and Mark Hawthorne (Ire)
Player of the match: Shakti Gauchan (Nep)

- Denmark won the toss and chose to bat.
- Points: Nepal 2, Denmark 0

15 March
10:00
Scorecard

Hong Kong; 81/8 (20 overs)	v	Canada; 84/2 (14 overs)
Babar Hayat 36 (43); Junaid Siddiqui 3/17 (4 overs)		Hiral Patel 40 (40); Irfan Ahmed 1/8 (1 over)

Canada won by 8 wickets
ICC Global Cricket Academy, Dubai
Umpires: Ahsan Raza (Pak) and Sarika Prasad (Sin)
Player of the match: Junaid Siddiqui (Can)

- Hong Kong won the toss and elected to bat
- Points: Canada 2, Hong Kong 0

15 March
10:00
Scorecard

Afghanistan; 172/5 (20 overs)	v	Denmark; 83/9 (20 overs)
Karim Sadiq 91 (60); Sair Anjum 2/34 (4 overs)		Kamran Mahmood 25* (32); Karim Sadiq 4/12 (4 Overs)

Afghanistan won by 89 runs
Sharjah Cricket Stadium, Sharjah
Umpires: Roger Dill (Ber) and Joel Wilson (WI)
Player of the match: Karim Sadiq (Afg)

- Afghanistan won the toss and elected to bat
- Points: Afghanistan 2, Denmark 0

15 March
14:00
Scorecard

Netherlands; 125/9 (20 overs)	v	Bermuda; 121/8 (20 overs)
Michael Swart 53 (51); Dion Stovell 2/14 (4 Overs)		Steven Outerbridge 34* (44); Timm van der Gugten 4/22 (4 Overs)

Netherlands won by 4 runs
Sheikh Zayed Stadium, Abu Dhabi
Umpires: Chris Gaffaney (NZ) and Ranmore Martinesz (Sri)
Player of the match: Michael Swart (Ned)

- Bermuda won the toss and elected to field.
- Points: Netherlands 2, Bermuda 0

15 March
14:00
Scorecard

Papua New Guinea; 137/8 (20 overs)	v	Nepal; 102/8 (20 overs)
Chris Amini 38* (32); Shakti Gauchan 2/22 (4 Overs)		Prithu Baskota 36* (36); Chris Amini 2/20 (4 Overs)

Papua New Guinea won by 35 runs
Sharjah Cricket Stadium, Sharjah
Umpires: Roger Dill (Ber) and Ian Ramage (Sco)
Player of the match: Chris Amini (PNG)

- Nepal won the toss and elected to field.
- Points: Papua New Guinea 2, Nepal 0

16 March
10:00
Scorecard

Canada; 175/6 (20 overs)	v	Bermuda; 103 (19.2 overs)
Ruvindu Gunasekera 83 (48); Rodney Trott 2/14 (4 overs)		Lionel Cann 33 (21); Rizwan Cheema 3/16 (4 overs)

Canada won by 72 runs
Dubai International Cricket Stadium, Dubai
Umpires: Chris Gaffaney (NZ) and Mark Hawthorne (Ire)
Player of the match: Ruvindu Gunasekera (Can)

- Bermuda won the toss and elected to field
- Points: Canada 2, Bermuda 0

16 March
10:00
Scorecard

Denmark; 117/9 (20 overs)	v	Netherlands; 122/3 (16.1 overs)
James Moniz 47* (26); Peter Borren 3/14 (4 overs)		Stephan Myburgh 55* (53); Basit Raja 1/26 (3 overs)

Netherlands won by 7 wickets
ICC Global Cricket Academy Ground No 2, Dubai
Umpires: Roger Dill (Ber) and Ranmore Martinesz (Sri)
Player of the match: Stephan Myburgh (Ned)

- Denmark won the toss and elected to bat
- Points: Netherlands 2, Denmark 0

16 March
14:00
Scorecard

Hong Kong; 131/9 (20 overs)	v	Papua New Guinea; 132/6 (19.5 overs)
Jamie Atkinson 52 (42); Chris Amini 2/15 (4 overs)		Tony Ura 46 (33); Nizakat Khan 3/18 (4 overs)

Papua New Guinea won by 4 wickets
Dubai International Cricket Stadium, Dubai
Umpires: Mark Hawthorne (Ire) and Ian Ramage (Sco)
Player of the match: Tony Ura (PNG)

- Hong Kong won the toss and elected to bat.
- Points: Papua New Guinea 2, Hong Kong 0

16 March
14:00
Scorecard

Afghanistan; 157/6 (20 overs)	v	Nepal; 123/6 (20 overs)
Karim Sadiq 52 (39); Chandra Sawad 3/30 (3 overs)		Anil Mandal 50 (49); Dawlat Zadran 2/16 (3 overs)

Afghanistan won by 34 runs
Sharjah Cricket Stadium, Sharjah
Umpires: Simon Taufel (Aus) and Sudhir Asnani (Ind)
Player of the match: Karim Sadiq (Afg)

- Afghanistan won the toss and elected to bat.
- Points: Afghanistan 2, Nepal 0

18 March
10:00
Scorecard

Hong Kong; 170/5 (20 overs)	v	Denmark; 135/9 (20 overs)
Irfan Ahmed 91* (60); Bobby Chawla 3/19 (4 overs)		Aftab Ahmed 39 (31); Kinchit Shah 4/21 (4 overs)

Hong Kong won by 35 runs
ICC Global Cricket Academy, Dubai
Umpires: Sudhir Asnani (Ind) and Johan Cloete (SA)
Player of the match: Irfan Ahmed (Hkg)

- Hong Kong won the toss and elected to bat.
- Points: Hong Kong 2, Denmark 0

18 March
10:00
Scorecard

Papua New Guinea; 140/7 (20 overs)	v	Netherlands; 141/1 (16.1 overs)
Tony Ura 70 (58); Peter Borren 3/24 (4 overs)		Michael Swart 59 (42); Jason Kila 1/15 (2 overs)

Netherlands won by 9 wickets
Sheikh Zayed Stadium, Abu Dhabi
Umpires: Ahsan Raza (Pak) and Ian Ramage (Sco)
Player of the match: Michael Swart (Ned)

- Papua New Guinea won the toss and elected to bat.
- Points: Netherlands 2, Papua New Guinea 0

18 March
14:00
Scorecard

Afghanistan; 178/8 (20 overs)	v	Canada; 133/9 (20 overs)
Samiullah Shenwari 61 (34); Zahid Hussain 3/16 (4 overs)		Nitish Kumar 38 (34); Samiullah Shenwari 4/14 (4 overs)

Afghanistan won by 41 runs
ICC Global Cricket Academy, Dubai
Umpires: Sudhir Asnani (Ind) and Joel Wilson (WI)
Player of the match: Samiullah Shenwari (Afg)

- Afghanistan won the toss and elected to bat.
- Points: Afghanistan 2, Canada 0

18 March
14:00
Scorecard

Nepal; 151/6 (20 overs)	v	Bermuda; 127/5 (20 overs)
Paras Khadka 65* (48); Dion Stovell 4/25 (4 overs)		Janeiro Tucker 32 (27); Shakti Gauchan 3/17 (4 overs)

Nepal won by 24 runs
Sheikh Zayed Stadium, Abu Dhabi
Umpires: Ahsan Raza (Pak) and Mark Hawthorne (Ire)
Player of the match: Paras Khadka (Nep)

- Nepal won the toss and elected to bat.
- Points: Nepal 2, Bermuda 0

19 March
10:00
Scorecard

Nepal; 85/7 (20 overs)	v	Netherlands; 86/4 (13.5 overs)
Gyanendra Malla 32 (49); Michael Swart 2/13 (4 overs)		Tom Cooper 18* (15); Basanta Regmi 3/32 (4 overs)

Netherlands won by 6 wickets
ICC Global Cricket Academy, Dubai
Umpires: Simon Taufel (Aus) and Ian Ramage (Sco)
Player of the match: Michael Swart (Neth)

- Netherlands won the toss and elected to field
- Points: Netherlands 2, Nepal 0

19 March
10:00
Scorecard

Hong Kong; 103/9 (20 overs)	v	Afghanistan; 104/1 (11.1 overs)
Irfan Ahmed 54 (52); Dawlat Zadran 5/14 (4 overs)		Mohammad Shahzad 43* (32); Aizaz Khan 1/18 (2 overs)

Afghanistan won by 9 wickets
Sharjah Cricket Stadium, Sharjah
Umpires: Buddhi Pradhan (Nep) and Joel Wilson (WI)
Player of the match: Dawlat Zadran (Afg)

- Hong Kong won the toss and elected to bat
- Points: Afghanistan 2, Hong Kong 0

19 March
14:00
Scorecard

Papua New Guinea; 155/6 (20 overs)	v	Bermuda; 158/5 (19.3 overs)
Vani Morea 49* (31); Dion Stovell 2/21 (4 overs)		Janeiro Tucker 52* (33); Tony Ura 1/2 (2 overs)

Bermuda won by 5 wickets
ICC Global Cricket Academy, Dubai
Umpires: Simon Taufel (Aus) and Mark Hawthorne (Ire)
Player of the match: Janeiro Tucker (Ber)

- Papua New Guinea won the toss and elected to bat.
- Points: Bermuda 2, Papua New Guinea 0

19 March
14:00
Scorecard

Canada; 178/3 (20 overs)	v	Denmark; 123/4 (20 overs)
Ruvindu Gunasekera 95 (65); Sair Anjum 1/32 (4 overs)		Rizwan Mahmood 65* (58); Henry Osinde 3/16 (2 overs)

Canada won by 55 runs
Sheikh Zayed Stadium, Abu Dhabi
Umpires: Chris Gaffaney (NZ) and Johan Cloete (SA)
Player of the match: Ruvindu Gunasekera (Can)

- Canada won the toss and elected to bat.
- Points: Canada 2, Denmark 0

20 March
10:00
Scorecard

Afghanistan; 177/5 (20 overs)	v	Bermuda; 162/7 (20 overs)
Mohammad Shahzad 64* (38); Dion Stovell 2/38 (4 overs)		Janeiro Tucker 37 (16); Aftab Alam 3/23 (4 overs)

Afghanistan won by 15 runs
ICC Global Cricket Academy, Dubai
Umpires: Johan Cloete (SA) and Mark Hawthorne (Ire)
Player of the match: Mohammad Shahzad (Afg)

- Afghanistan won the toss and elected to bat
- Points: Afghanistan 2, Bermuda 0

20 March
10:00
Scorecard

Netherlands; 201/5 (20 overs)	v	Hong Kong; 118/7 (20 overs)
Stephan Myburgh 68 (36); Roy Lamsam 2/35 (4 overs)		Jamie Atkinson 64 (45); Tom Cooper 2/8 (4 overs)

Netherlands won by 83 runs
Sharjah Cricket Stadium, Sharjah
Umpires: Ahsan Raza (Pak) and Ian Ramage (Sco)
Player of the match: Tom Cooper (Ned)

- Netherlands won the toss and elected to bat
- Points: Netherlands 2, Hong Kong 0

20 March
14:00
Scorecard

Papua New Guinea; 148 (20 overs)	v	Denmark; 134/8 (20 overs)
Geraint Jones 46 (33); Aftab Ahmed 6/22 (4 overs)		Michael Pedersen 38 (40); Willie Gavera 3/25 (3 overs)

Papua New Guinea won by 14 runs
Sheikh Zayed Stadium, Abu Dhabi
Umpires: Roger Dill (Ber) and Sarika Prasad (Sin)
Player of the match: Aftab Ahmed (Den)

- Papua New Guinea won the toss and elected to bat
- Points: Papua New Guinea 2, Denmark 0

20 March
14:00
Scorecard

Canada; 101/8 (20 overs)	v	Nepal; 83 (18.2 overs)
Jimmy Hansra 29* (34); Paras Khadka 2/15 (4 overs)		Sharad Vesawkar 28 (35); Junaid Siddiqui 3/13 (4 overs)

Canada won by 18 runs.
Sharjah Cricket Stadium, Sharjah
Umpires: Chris Gaffaney (NZ) and Ian Ramage (Sco)
Player of the match: Jimmy Hansra (Can)

- Canada won the toss and elected to bat
- Points: Canada 2, Nepal 0

=== Group B ===
==== Points table ====
Pos	Team	Pld	W	L	T	NR	Pts	NRR	Qualification
1	Namibia	7	7	0	0	0	14	1.186	Qualified for the 1st to 6th Place Play-Offs
2	Ireland	7	6	1	0	0	12	2.210	Qualified for the 1st to 6th Place Play-Offs
3	Scotland	7	4	3	0	0	8	0.347	Qualified for the 1st to 6th Place Play-Offs
4	Kenya	7	4	3	0	0	8	0.340	Qualified for the 7th to 10th Place Play-Offs
5	Italy	7	3	4	0	0	6	−0.006	Qualified for the 7th to 10th Place Play-Offs
6	United States	7	2	5	0	0	4	−1.002	Qualified for the 11th to 14th Place Play-Offs
7	Uganda	7	2	5	0	0	4	−1.190	Qualified for the 11th to 14th Place Play-Offs
8	Oman	7	0	7	0	0	0	−1.801	Qualified for the 15th Place Play-Off

==== Results ====
13 March
10:00
Scorecard

Oman; 89/9 (20 overs)	v	Italy; 90/1 (14 overs)
Sultan Ahmed 16* (26); Carl Sandri 4/9 (4 overs)		Michael Di Venuto 42* (40); Rajeshkumar Ranpura 1/8 (3 overs)

Italy won by 9 wickets
ICC Global Cricket Academy, Dubai
Umpires: Simon Taufel (Aus) and Roger Dill (Ber)
Player of the match: Carl Sandri (Ita)

- Oman won the toss and elected to bat.
- Points: Italy 2, Oman 0.

13 March
10:00
Scorecard

Namibia; 160/8 (20 overs)	v	Ireland; 156/9 (20 overs)
Louis van der Westhuizen 34 (16); Paul Stirling 3/20 (4 overs)		Gary Wilson 49 (32); Louis van der Westhuizen 2/37 (4 overs)

Namibia won by 4 runs
ICC Global Cricket Academy Ground No 2, Dubai
Umpires: Ian Ramage (Sco) and Johan Cloete (SA)
Player of the match: Louis van der Westhuizen (Nam)

- Namibia won the toss and elected to bat
- Points: Namibia 2, Ireland 0.

13 March
10:00
Scorecard

United States; 123/8 (20 overs)	v	Uganda; 124/6 (19.2 overs)
Sushil Nadkarni 38 (29); Roger Mukasa 2/14 (4 overs)		Frank Nsubuga 30 (19); Muhammad Ghous 2/16 (4 overs)

Uganda won by 4 wickets
Sharjah Cricket Stadium, Sharjah
Umpires: Ranmore Martinesz (Sri) and Sudhir Asnani (Ind)
Player of the match: Davis Arinaitwe (Uga)

- United States of America won the toss and elected to bat
- Points: Uganda 2, United States of America 0.

13 March
14:00
Scorecard

Scotland; 178/7 (20 overs)	v	Kenya; 164 (20 overs)
Calum MacLeod 55 (35); James Ngoche 2/31 (4 overs)		Collins Obuya 50 (32); Gordon Drummond 3/20 (4 overs)

Scotland won by 14 runs
ICC Global Cricket Academy, Dubai
Umpires: Simon Taufel (Aus) and Ahsan Raza (Pak)
Player of the match: Calum MacLeod (Sco)

- Scotland won the toss and elected to bat
- Points: Scotland 2, Kenya 0.

14 March
10:00
Scorecard

Kenya; 71 (19 overs)	v	Ireland; 72/0 (7.2 overs)
Tanmay Mishra 28 (32); Boyd Rankin 3/20 (4 overs)		William Porterfield 56* (27); Ragheb Aga 0/9 (2 overs)

Ireland won by 10 wickets
Dubai International Cricket Stadium, Dubai
Umpires: Simon Taufel (Aus) and Buddhi Pradhan (Nep)
Player of the match: Boyd Rankin (Ire)

- Kenya won the toss and elected to bat
- Points: Ireland 2, Kenya 0.

14 March
10:00
Scorecard

Italy; 137/6 (20 overs)	v	United States; 129/8 (20 overs)
Carl Sandri 49* (28); Muhammad Ghous 2/18 (4 overs)		Asif Khan 35* (29); Damian Crowley 3/20 (4 overs)

Italy won by 8 runs
Sheikh Zayed Stadium, Abu Dhabi
Umpires: Sudhir Asnani (Ind) and Roger Dill (Ber)
Player of the match: Carl Sandri (Ita)

- Italy won the toss and elected to bat
- Points: Italy 2, United States of America 0.

14 March
14:00
Scorecard

Oman; 128/8 (20 overs)	v	Uganda; 132/7 (19.1 overs)
Zeeshan Siddiqui 30 (15); Davis Arinaitwe 3/21 (4 overs)		Roger Mukasa 45 (45); Zeeshan Siddiqui 3/16 (3 overs)

Uganda win by 3 wickets.
ICC Global Cricket Academy Ground No 2, Dubai
Umpires: Ian Ramage (Sco) and Joel Wilson (WI)
Player of the match: Roger Mukasa(Uga)

- Oman won the toss and chose to bat.
- Points: Uganda 2, Oman 0

14 March
14:00
Scorecard

Namibia; 192/3 (20 overs)	v	Scotland; 143/8 (20 overs)
Louis van der Westhuizen 106* (54); Safyaan Sharif 1/23 (3 overs)		Richie Berrington 31 (22); Raymond van Schoor 2/11 (2 overs)

Namibia won by 49 runs
Sheikh Zayed Stadium, Abu Dhabi
Umpires: Ahsan Raza (Pak) and Sudhir Asnani (Ind)
Player of the match: Louis van der Westhuizen (Nam)

- Namibia won the toss and chose to bat.
- Points: Namibia 2, Scotland 0

15 March
10:00
Scorecard

Namibia; 177/4 (20 overs)	v	United States; 160/7 (20 overs)
Raymond van Schoor 79* (55); Abhimanyu Rajp 2/31 (4 overs)		Aditya Mishra 53(34); Christi Viljoen 2/21 (3 Overs)

Namibia won by 17 runs
ICC Global Cricket Academy Ground No 2, Dubai
Umpires: Sudhir Asnani (Ind) and Buddhi Pradhan (Nep)
Player of the match: Raymond van Schoor (Nam)

- Namibia won the toss and elected to bat
- Points: Namibia 2, United States of America 0

15 March
10:00
Scorecard

Italy; 100/7 (20 overs)	v	Ireland; 104/8 (19.4 overs)
Michael Di Venuto 23 (44); Boyd Rankin 3/16 (4 overs)		Gary Wilson 30* (30); Damian Crowley 3/16 (4 Overs)

Ireland won by 2 wickets
Sheikh Zayed Stadium, Abu Dhabi
Umpires: Simon Taufel (Aus) and Chris Gaffaney (NZ)
Player of the match: Boyd Rankin (Ire)

- Italy won the toss and elected to bat
- Points: Ireland 2, Italy 0

15 March
14:00
Scorecard

Scotland; 170/6 (20 overs)	v	Uganda; 136/9 (20 overs)
Calum MacLeod 45 (34); Jonathan Ssebanja 3/29 (4 overs)		Deusdedit Muhumuza 23 (16); Majid Haq 3/18 (4 overs)

Scotland won by 34 runs
ICC Global Cricket Academy, Dubai
Umpires: Ahsan Raza (Pak) and Johan Cloete (SA)
Player of the match: Calum MacLeod (Sco)

- Scotland won the toss and elected to bat.
- Points: Scotland 2, Uganda 0

15 March
14:00
Scorecard

Kenya; 176/5 (20 overs)	v	Oman; 141/9 (20 overs)
Alex Obanda 52 (38); Zeeshan Siddiqui 2/20 (2 overs)		Adnan Ilyas 35 (27); James Ngoche 2/16 (4 overs)

Kenya won by 35 runs
ICC Global Cricket Academy Ground No 2, Dubai
Umpires: Mark Hawthorne (Ire) and Buddhi Pradhan (Nep)
Player of the match: Alex Obanda (Ken)

- Kenya won the toss and elected to bat.
- Points: Kenya 2, Oman 0

16 March
10:00
Scorecard

Namibia; 140/5 (20 overs)	v	Uganda; 136/6 (20 overs)
Raymond van Schoor 60 (62); Charles Waiswa 3/29 (4 overs)		Arthur Kyobe 38 (35); Sarel Burger 2/15 (4 overs)

Namibia won by 4 runs
Sheikh Zayed Cricket Stadium, Abu Dhabi
Umpires: Buddhi Pradhan (Nep) and Johan Cloete (SA)
Player of the match: Raymond van Schoor (Nam)

- Uganda won the toss and elected to field
- Points: Namibia 2, Uganda 0

16 March
10:00
Scorecard

Scotland; 158/5 (20 overs)	v	Oman; 106 (17.4 overs)
Calum MacLeod 104* (76); Zeeshan Siddiqui 4/28 (4 overs)		Amir Ali 25 (20); Majid Haq 3/12 (3.4 overs)

Scotland won by 52 runs
Sharjah Cricket Stadium, Sharjah
Umpires: Simon Taufel and Sarika Prasad
Player of the match: Calum MacLeod (Sco)

- Scotland won the toss and elected to bat
- Points: Scotland 2, Oman 0

16 March
14:00
Scorecard

Ireland; 160/6 (20 Overs)	v	United States; 96 (18 Overs)
Kevin O'Brien 47(36); Elmore Hutchinson 3/22 (3 overs)		Elmore Hutchinson 29 (33); Boyd Rankin 4/9 (4 overs)

Ireland won by 64 runs
ICC Global Cricket Academy Ground No 2, Dubai
Umpires: Ahsan Raza (Pak) and Ranmore Martinesz (Sri)
Player of the match: Boyd Rankin (Ire)

- Ireland won the toss and elected to bat.
- Points: Ireland 2, United States of America 0

16 March
14:00
Scorecard

Italy; 145/4 (20 overs)	v	Kenya; 146/3 (17.5 overs)
Gareth Berg 60 (55); Collins Obuya 2/23 (3 overs)		Alex Obanda 79 (47); Damian Crowley 2/21 (4 overs)

Kenya won by 7 wickets
Sheikh Zayed Cricket Stadium, Abu Dhabi
Umpires: Joel Wilson (WI) and Johan Cloete (SA)
Player of the match: Alex Obanda (Ken)

- Italy won the toss and elected to bat.
- Points: Kenya 2, Italy 0

18 March
10:00
Scorecard

United States; 141/7 (20 overs)	v	Oman; 111/7 (20 overs)
Sushil Nadkarni 59 (47); Zeeshan Siddiqui 2/19 (2 overs)		Vaibhav Wategaonkar 30 (37); Japen Patel 3/29 (4 overs)

United States won by 30 runs
Dubai International Cricket Stadium, Dubai
Umpires: Ranmore Martinesz (Sri) and Sarika Prasad (Sin)
Player of the match: Usman Shuja (USA)

- United States of America won the toss and elected to bat.
- Points: United States of America 2, Oman 0

18 March
10:00
Scorecard

Italy; 131/7 (20 overs)	v	Uganda; 118 all out (19.4 overs)
Damian Crowley 44 (24); Jonathan Ssebanja 2/14 (2 overs)		Charles Waiswa 25* (13); Gareth Berg 4/20 (3.4 overs)

Italy won by 13 runs
Sharjah Cricket Stadium, Sharjah
Umpires: Roger Dill (Ber) and Chris Gaffaney (NZ)
Player of the match: Gareth Berg (Ita)

- Uganda won the toss and elected to field.
- Points: Italy 2, Uganda 0

18 March
14:00
Scorecard

Ireland; 159/5 (20 overs)	v	Scotland; 142/7 (20 overs)
Ed Joyce 78 (58); Majid Haq 2/18 (4 overs)		Kyle Coetzer 62 (52); Kevin O'Brien 3/35 (4 overs)

Ireland won by 17 runs
Dubai International Cricket Stadium, Dubai
Umpires: Ranmore Martinesz (Sri) and Simon Taufel (Aus)
Player of the match: Ed Joyce (Ire)

- Ireland won the toss and elected to bat.
- Points: Ireland 2, Scotland 0

18 March
14:00
Scorecard

Kenya; 108 all out (18.4 overs)	v	Namibia; 109/3 (16.3 overs)
Duncan Allan 40 (33); Louis Klazinga 4/9 (3 overs)		Raymond van Schoor 49* (48); James Ngoche 1/15 (4 overs)

Namibia won by 8 wickets
Sharjah Cricket Stadium, Sharjah
Umpires: Chris Gaffaney (NZ) and Buddhi Pradhan (Nep)
Player of the match: Louis Klazinga (Nam)

- Kenya won the toss and elected to bat.
- Points: Namibia 2, Kenya 0

19 March
10:00
Scorecard

Italy; 136/8 (20 overs)	v	Scotland; 137/3 (18 overs)
Gareth Berg 29 (27); Majid Haq 2/16 (4 overs)		Richie Berrington 67 (45); Gayashan Munasinghe 1/24 (4 overs)

Scotland won by 7 wickets
ICC Global Cricket Academy Ground No 2, Dubai
Umpires: Roger Dill (Ber) and Sudhir Asnani (Ind)
Player of the match: Richie Berrington (Sco)

- Italy won the toss and elected to bat
- Points: Scotland 2, Italy 0

19 March
10:00
Scorecard

United States; 90 (18.2 overs)	v	Kenya; 93/1 (10 overs)
Sushil Nadkarni 41 (42); Nehemiah Odhiambo 3/13 (3.2 overs)		Duncan Allan 34* (26); Muhammad Ghous 1/26 (3 overs)

Kenya won by 9 wickets
Sheikh Zayed Cricket Stadium, Abu Dhabi
Umpires: Johan Cloete (RSA) and Ranmore Martinesz (Sri)
Player of the match: Nehemiah Odhiambo (Ken)

- United States of America won the toss and elected to bat
- Points: Kenya 2, United States of America 0

19 March
14:00
Scorecard

Ireland; 179/5 (20 overs)	v	Uganda; 97 (19.5 overs)
William Porterfield 53 (43); Jonathan Ssebanja 2/9 (2 overs)		Jonathan Ssebanja 20 (27); George Dockrell 3/26 (3.5 overs)

Ireland won by 82 runs
ICC Global Cricket Academy Ground No 2, Dubai
Umpires: Ahsan Raza (Pak) and Roger Dill (Ber)
Player of the match: Kevin O'Brien (Ire)

- Uganda won the toss and elected to field.
- Points: Ireland 2, Uganda 0

19 March
14:00
Scorecard

Namibia; 120/7 (20 overs)	v	Oman; 84 (18.4 overs)
Sarel Burger 53 (44); Ajay Lalcheta 2/13 (4 overs)		Vaibhav Wategaonkar 16 (14); Christi Viljoen 4/8 (3.4 overs)

Namibia won by 36 runs
Sharjah Cricket Stadium, Sharjah
Umpires: Buddhi Pradhan (Nep) and Sarika Prasad (Sin)
Player of the match: Sarel Burger (Nam)

- Namibia won the toss and elected to bat
- Points: Namibia 2, Oman 0

20 March
10:00
Scorecard

Kenya; 167/3 (20 overs)	v	Uganda; 119/8 (20 overs)
Collins Obuya 57* (35); Davis Arinaitwe 1/22 (4 overs)		Frank Nsubuga 26 (20); Shem Ngoche 3/20 (4 overs)

Kenya won by 48 runs
ICC Global Cricket Academy Ground No 2, Dubai
Umpires: Simon Taufel (Aus) and Joel Wilson (WI)
Player of the match: Collins Obuya (Ken)

- Kenya won the toss and elected to bat
- Points: Kenya 2, Uganda 0

20 March
10:00
Scorecard

Ireland; 160/5 (20 overs)	v	Oman; 116/6 (20 overs)
Gary Wilson 52* (38); Rajeshkumar Ranpura 2/24 (4 overs)		Jatinder Singh 56* (55); Max Sorensen 2/20 (4 overs)

Ireland won by 44 runs
Sheikh Zayed Cricket Stadium, Abu Dhabi
Umpires: Sarika Prasad (Sin) and Sudhir Asnani (Ind)
Player of the match: Gary Wilson (Ire)

- Ireland won the toss and elected to bat
- Points: Ireland 2, Oman 0

20 March
14:00
Scorecard

Namibia; 194/2 (20 overs)	v	Italy; 167/8 (20 overs)
Gerrie Snyman 78 (49); Vince Pennazza 1/35 (4 overs)		Gareth Berg 47 (32); Louis van der Westhuizen 2/29 (4 overs)

Namibia won by 27 runs
ICC Global Cricket Academy, Dubai
Umpires: Mark Hawthorne (Ire) and Ranmore Martinesz (Sri)
Player of the match: Raymond van Schoor (Nam)

- Italy won the toss and elected to field
- Points: Namibia 2, Italy 0.

20 March
14:00
Scorecard

Scotland; 161/8 (20 overs)	v	United States; 163/2 (20 overs)
Jan Stander 58 (31); Usman Shuja 3/39 (4 overs)		Aditya Mishra 62 (54); Preston Mommsen 1/24 (4 overs)

United States of America won by 7 wickets
ICC Global Cricket Academy Ground No 2, Dubai
Umpires: Buddhi Pradhan (Nep) and Joel Wilson (WI)
Player of the match: Aditya Mishra (USA)

- Scotland won the toss and elected to bat
- Points: United States of America 2, Scotland 0.

=== Play-off stage ===
==== 15th place play-off ====
22 March
10:00
Scorecard

Oman; 155/5 (20 overs)	v	Denmark; 138/6 (20 overs)
Zeeshan Siddiqui 67 (36); Martin Pedersen 2/23 (4 overs)		Frederik Klokker 40 (37); Hemal Mehta 3/29 (4 Overs)

Oman won by 17 runs
ICC Global Cricket Academy Ground No 2, Dubai
Umpires: Roger Dill (Ber) and Joel Wilson (WI)
Player of the match: Zeeshan Siddiqui (Oma)

- Oman won the toss and elected to bat.
- Oman won the 15th Place Play-Off

==== 11th to 14th place play-offs ====
11th Place Play-Off Semi-Final 1

22 March
10:00
Scorecard

Uganda; 130/8 (20 overs)	v	Hong Kong; 134/5 (19.2 overs)
Arthur Kyobe 32 (33); Irfan Ahmed 3/32 (4 overs)		Irfan Ahmed 55* (51); Brian Masaba 2/8 (2.2 overs)

Hong Kong won by 5 wickets.
Sharjah Cricket Stadium, Sharjah
Umpires: Sudhir Asnani (Ind) and Mark Hawthorne (Ire)
Player of the match: Irfan Ahmed (Hkg)

- Hong Kong won the toss and elected to bowl.
- Hong Kong advances to 11th Place Play-Off.
- Uganda advances to the 13th Place Play-Off.

11th Place Play-Off Semi-Final 2

22 March
14:00
Scorecard

United States; 193/5 (20 overs)	v	Bermuda; 159/8 (20 overs)
Sushil Nadkarni 48 (30); Sam Robinson 2/41 (4 overs)		Lionel Cann 73 (47); Muhammad Ghous 2/20 (4 overs)

United States of America won by 34 runs.
Sharjah Cricket Stadium, Sharjah
Umpires: Sudhir Asnani (Ind) and Sarika Prasad (Sin)
Player of the match: Sushil Nadkarni (USA)

- United States of America won the toss and elected to bat.
- United States of America advances to 11th Place Play-Off.
- Bermuda advances to 13th Place Play-Off.

13th Place Play-Off

23 March
10:00
Scorecard

Bermuda; 179/4 (20 overs)	v	Uganda; 138/5 (20 overs)
Janeiro Tucker 62* (41); Jonathan Ssebanja 2/31 (3 overs)		Arthur Kyobe 41 (37); Dion Stovell 1/23 (4 overs)

Bermuda won by 41 runs
ICC Global Cricket Academy Ground No 2, Dubai
Umpires: Mark Hawthorne (Ire) and Sarika Prasad (Sin)
Player of the match: Janeiro Tucker (Ber)

- Uganda won the toss and elected to field.
- Bermuda won the 13th Place Play-Off

11th Place Play-Off

23 March
14:00
Scorecard

Hong Kong; 177/4 (20 overs)	v	United States; 100 (16.2 overs)
Jamie Atkinson 63 (38); Orlando Baker 2/24 (4 overs)		Steven Taylor 26 (12); Aizaz Khan 5/25 (4 overs)

Hong Kong won by 77 runs
ICC Global Cricket Academy Ground No 2, Dubai
Umpires: Johan Cloete (SA) and Mark Hawthorne (Ire)
Player of the match: Aizaz Khan (Hkg)

- Hong Kong won the toss and elected to bat.
- Hong Kong won the 11th Place Play-Off

==== 7th to 10th place play-offs ====
7th Place Play-Off Semi-Final 1

22 March
14:00
Scorecard

Kenya; 139/4 (20 overs)	v	Nepal; 141/5 (19.4 overs)
Collins Obuya 52 (42); Basanta Regmi 3/23 (4 overs)		Pradeep Airee 45 (38); James Ngoche 3/23 (4 overs)

Nepal won by 5 wickets.
ICC Global Cricket Academy, Dubai
Umpires: Ranmore Martinesz (Sri) and Ian Ramage (Sco)
Player of the match: Basanta Regmi (Nep)

- Kenya won the toss and elected to bat.
- Nepal advances to 7th Place Play-Off.
- Kenya advances to 9th Place Play-Off.

7th Place Play-Off Semi-Final 2

22 March
14:00
Scorecard

Papua New Guinea; 118/9 (20 overs)	v	Italy; 106/7 (20 overs)
Tony Ura 37 (25); Damian Crowley 4/18 (4 overs)		Peter Petricola 30 (30); Hitolo Areni 3/9 (4 overs)

Papua New Guinea won by 12 runs.
ICC Global Cricket Academy Ground No 2, Dubai
Umpires: Ahsan Raza (Pak) and Joel Wilson (WI)
Player of the match: Hitolo Areni (Png)

- Papua New Guinea won the toss and elected to bat.
- Papua New Guinea advances to 7th Place Play-Off.
- Italy advances to 9th Place Play-Off.

9th Place Play-Off

23 March
10:00
Scorecard

Kenya; 170/5 (20 overs)	v	Italy; 132 (18.3 overs)
Morris Ouma 51* (46); Vince Pennazza 2/33 (4 overs)		Peter Petricola 37 (29); Hiren Varaiya 4/25 (4 overs)

Kenya won by 38 runs
ICC Global Cricket Academy, Dubai
Umpires: Ranmore Martinesz (Sri) and Ian Ramage (Sco)
Player of the match: Hiren Varaiya (Ken)

- Kenya won the toss and elected to bat.
- Kenya won the 9th Place Play-Off

7th Place Play-Off

23 March
14:00
Scorecard

Papua New Guinea; 129/5 (20 overs)	v	Nepal; 133/4 (19.5 overs)
Vani Morea 34* (29); Shakti Gauchan 2/20 (4 overs)		Paras Khadka 62* (43); Chris Amini 1/6 (2 overs)

Nepal won by 6 wickets
ICC Global Cricket Academy, Dubai
Umpires: Sudhir Asnani (Ind) and Ian Ramage (Sco)
Player of the match: Paras Khadka (Nep)

- Papua New Guinea won the toss and elected to bat.
- Nepal won the 7th Place Play-Off

==== 1st to 6th Place play-offs ====
Elimination Play-Off 1

22 March
10:00
Scorecard

Scotland; 166/6 (20 overs)	v	Netherlands; 169/7 (19.1 overs)
Calum MacLeod 57 (42); Pieter Seelaar 2/25 (4 overs)		Tom Cooper 60 (32); Majid Haq 3/22 (4 overs)

Netherlands won by 3 wickets.
ICC Global Cricket Academy, Dubai
Umpires: Ranmore Martinesz (Sri) and Buddhi Pradhan (Nep)
Player of the match: Tom Cooper (Ned)

- Scotland won the toss and elected to bat.
- Netherlands advances to Elimination Semi-Final.

Elimination Play-Off 2

22 March
10:00
Scorecard

Canada; 106/8 (20 overs)	v	Ireland; 109/0 (9.3 overs)
Ruvindu Gunasekera 26 (33); George Dockrell 3/19 (4 overs)		Paul Stirling 61* (32); Zahid Hussain 0/11 (1.3 overs)

Ireland won by 10 wickets.
Dubai International Cricket Stadium, Dubai
Umpires: Johan Cloete (SA) and Chris Gaffaney (NZ)
Player of the match: Paul Stirling (Ire)

- Canada won the toss and elected to bat.
- Ireland advances to Elimination Semi-Final.

5th Place Play-Off

23 March
14:00
Scorecard

Canada; 135/8 (20 Overs)	v	Scotland; 136/6 (20 Overs)
Harvir Baidwan 21(16); Moneeb Iqbal 2/15 (4 overs)		Richie Berrington 47(37); Junaid Siddiqui 2/12 (3 overs)

Scotland won by 4 wickets.
Dubai International Cricket Stadium, Dubai
Umpires: Buddhi Pradhan (Nep) and Joel Wilson (WI)
Player of the match: Richie Berrington (Sco)

- Canada won the toss and chose to bat.
- Scotland won the 5th Place Play-Off.

Qualifying Final 1

22 March
14:00
Scorecard

Afghanistan; 146 (20 overs)	v	Namibia; 99 (18.1 overs)
Karim Sadiq 28 (24); Sarel Burger 3/16 (4 overs)		Nicholaas Scholtz 22 (26); Aftab Alam 3/25 (4 overs)

Afghanistan won by 47 runs.
Dubai International Cricket Stadium, Dubai
Umpires: Johan Cloete (SA) and Simon Taufel (Aus)
Player of the match: Aftab Alam (Afg)

- Afghanistan won the toss and elected to bat.
- Afghanistan advances to the final and qualifies for the 2012 ICC World Twenty20.
- Namibia advances to the Qualifying Final 2.

Elimination Semi-Final

23 March
10:00
Scorecard

Netherlands; 114/7 (20 overs)	v	Ireland; 115/3 (16.4 overs)
Alexei Kervezee 56 (48); Kevin O'Brien 2/17 (4 overs)		Paul Stirling 33 (23); Michael Swart 2/23 (4 overs)

Ireland won by 7 wickets
Dubai International Cricket Stadium, Dubai
Umpires: Ahsan Raza (Pak) and Chris Gaffaney (NZ)
Player of the match: Kevin O'Brien (Ire)

- Ireland won the toss and elected to field.
- Ireland advances to the Qualifying Final 2.

Qualifying Final 2

24 March
10:00
Scorecard

Namibia; 94/6 (20 overs)	v	Ireland; 96/1 (10.1 overs)
Ian Opperman 26* (15); Max Sorensen 2/8 (4 overs)		Paul Stirling 59* (32); Louis Klazinga 1/10 (1 over)

Ireland won by 9 wickets
Dubai International Cricket Stadium, Dubai
Umpires: Johan Cloete (SA) and Ranmore Martinesz (Sri)
Player of the match: Max Sorensen (Ire)

- Namibia won the toss and elected to bat.
- Ireland advances to the final and qualifies for the 2012 ICC World Twenty20.

Final

24 March
Scorecard

Afghanistan; 152/7 (20 overs)	v	Ireland; 156/5 (18.5 overs)
Mohammad Shahzad 77 (57); Kevin O'Brien 2/18 (4 overs)		Paul Stirling 79 (38); Dawlat Zadran 3/21 (4 overs)

Ireland won by 5 wickets
Dubai International Cricket Stadium, Dubai
Umpires: Chris Gaffaney (NZ) and Buddhi Pradhan (Nep)
Player of the match: Paul Stirling (Ire)

- Afghanistan won the toss and elected to bat.
- Ireland win the 2012 ICC World Twenty20 Qualifier.

Elimination play-offs
22 March
A2	Netherlands	169/7
B3	Scotland	166/6
22 March
A3	Canada	106/8
B4	Ireland	109/0

Qualifying / Elimination semi-finals
22 March
A1	Afghanistan	146/11
B1	Namibia	99/10
23 March
A2	Netherlands	114/7
B2	Ireland	115/3

Elimination final
24 March
B1	Namibia	94/6
B2	Ireland	96/1

Final
24 March
A1	Afghanistan	152/7
B2	Ireland	156/6

== Final standings ==
Position	Team	Promotion/Relegation
1st	Ireland	Qualified for 2012 ICC World Twenty20
2nd	Afghanistan	Qualified for 2012 ICC World Twenty20
3rd	Namibia	Automatic qualification for 2013 ICC World Twenty20 Qualifier
4th	Netherlands	Automatic qualification for 2013 ICC World Twenty20 Qualifier
5th	Scotland	Automatic qualification for 2013 ICC World Twenty20 Qualifier
6th	Canada	Automatic qualification for 2013 ICC World Twenty20 Qualifier
7th	Nepal	
8th	Papua New Guinea	
9th	Kenya	
10th	Italy	
11th	Hong Kong	
12th	United States	
13th	Bermuda	
14th	Uganda	
15th	Oman	
16th	Denmark	

== Statistics ==
=== Most runs ===
The top five most runs scorers are included in this table.

Player	Team	Runs	Inns	Avg	S/R	HS	100s	50s
Paul Stirling	Ireland	357	11	44.62	157.26	79	0	3
Mohammad Shahzad	Afghanistan	352	9	50.28	127.07	77	0	4
Jamie Atkinson	Hong Kong	345	8	49.28	149.35	87*	0	4
Raymond van Schoor	Namibia	324	9	54.00	110.95	79*	0	3
Calum MacLeod	Scotland	307	9	38.37	135.84	104*	1	2

=== Most wickets ===
The following table contains the five leading wicket-takers.

Player	Team	Wkts	Mts	Avg	S/R	Econ	BBI
Dawlat Zadran	Afghanistan	17	7	7.88	9.2	5.12	5/14
Majid Haq	Scotland	17	9	11.52	12.5	5.49	3/12
Shakti Gauchan	Nepal	16	9	11.18	13.5	4.97	4/20
Boyd Rankin	Ireland	15	11	11.06	15.6	4.25	4/9
Christi Viljoen	Namibia	14	9	12.71	10.8	7.02	4/8

== Broadcasting rights ==
- Global – ESPN Star Sports (Qualifying Finals, Preliminary Final, Tournament Final and six matches in all)
- Scotland – Quipu TV – 14 Group Stage Matches
- Ireland – Setanta Sports – (Qualifying Finals, Preliminary Final, Tournament Final and six matches in all)
- Ireland – RTÉ – Highlights of elimination and qualifying finals
- Afghanistan – Lemar TV – All Qualifiers in Pashto
- Pakistan – PTV Sports

== See also ==
- Twenty20 World Cup 2012
- 2012 ICC World Twenty20
- ICC World Twenty20 Qualifier
