= James Moniz =

Danish cricketer

Personal information
- Full name: James Elliott Alton Moniz
- Born: 16 August 1972 (age 54); Donolly, Victoria, Australia
- Batting: Right-handed
- Bowling: Right-arm off break

International information
- National side: Denmark

Career statistics
Competition	Twenty20
Matches	8
Runs scored	84
Batting average	14.00
100s/50s	–/–
Top score	47*
Balls bowled	–
Wickets	–
Bowling average	–
5 wickets in innings	–
10 wickets in match	–
Best bowling	–
Catches/stumpings	3/–
- Source: Cricinfo, 24 March 2012

James Elliott Alton Moniz (born 16 August 1972) is an Australian-born Danish cricketer. Moniz is a right-handed batsman who bowls right-arm off break.

He has lived in Denmark for several years, teaching at an elementary school. In March 2012, Denmark took part in the World Twenty20 Qualifier in the United Arab Emirates, having qualified for the event by winning the European T20 Championship. Moniz was selected in Denmark's fourteen man squad for the qualifier, making his Twenty20 debut against his native Bermuda at the Sharjah Cricket Association Stadium. He made six further appearances during the competition, the last of which came against Oman, with him scoring a total of 84 runs in the tournament at an average of 14.00, with a high score of 47 not out, which came in a defeat against the Netherlands.
