= Sam Robinson (cricketer) =

Bermudian cricketer

Personal information
- Full name: Samuel Robinson
- Born: 11 February 1976 (age 50); Warwick, Bermuda
- Batting: Right-handed
- Bowling: Right-arm off break

International information
- National side: Bermuda

Domestic team information
- Years: Team
- 1998/99–2007/08: Bermuda

Career statistics
Competition	List A	Twenty20
Matches	1	6
Runs scored	3	7
Batting average	3.00	–
100s/50s	–/–	–/–
Top score	3	7*
Balls bowled	–	114
Wickets	–	6
Bowling average	–	23.33
5 wickets in innings	–	–
10 wickets in match	–	–
Best bowling	–	2/27
Catches/stumpings	–/–	1/–
- Source: Cricinfo, 22 January 2013

Samuel Robinson (born 11 February 1976) is a former Bermudian cricketer. Robinson played as a right-handed batsman who bowls right-arm off break.

Robinson played for the Bermuda Under-19s in the 1995 International Youth Tournament in the Netherlands, making three appearances. The following year he played a minor match for the Bermuda Board President's XI against the touring New Zealanders. He made his full debut for Bermuda in a List A match against Guyana in the 1998–99 Red Stripe Bowl, scoring 3 runs before he was dismissed by Ramnaresh Sarwan, with Guyana winning the match by 152 runs. His next appearance for the team came in the 2002 ICC Americas Championship when he made a sole appearance against the United States. In February 2008, the Bermuda were invited to take part in the 2008 Stanford 20/20, whose matches held official Twenty20 status, with him making a single appearance in a first round defeat to Guyana. He next played for Bermuda in a series of minor matches in 2011.

In 2012, Robinson was selected as part of Bermuda's squad for the World Twenty20 Qualifier, making his first appearance of the tournament in a 24-run defeat to Nepal. Robinson made four further Twenty20 appearances in the tournament, the last of which came against Uganda. His five matches in the tournament saw him take 6 wickets at average of 23.33, with best figures of 2/27. Bermuda finished the tournament in thirteenth place, missing out on qualification for the World Twenty20.
