= Opperman =

There are also several persons called Opperman, listed at Opperman (disambiguation)

S.E. Opperman Ltd. was an engineering firm in Elstree, Hertfordshire, England. In 1862, the company was known as Opperman Sons & Taskers Ltd., at which time they were specializing in gear cutting and gearboxes. In 1934, they became S.E. Opperman Ltd. and began also manufacturing aircraft components. During WWII, they were a notable part of the war effort, making a number of components for naval vessels and aircraft. Their first foray into vehicle production came in 1942, in the form of a large, 8-wheeled, amphibious scout car called the Scorpion, which was built in hopes of making a production deal with the Department of Tank Design. Though it did well in testing, the design was ultimately rejected in favor of offerings from other companies, so the Scorpion project was abandoned. One of their most well-known products was the Motocart, which was a Monowheel tractor, introduced in 1946. The Motocart was available with either an 872cc JAP with 8 bhp or a 630 cc Douglas with 6 bhp, both being single-cylinder, 4-stroke, petrol engines. The Motocart remained in production until 1958, with a notable number of them being exported. In 1956, Opperman debuted their first road car: the Unicar. This was followed by the introduction of their second car, the Stirling, in 1958 (though the Stirling never went into production).

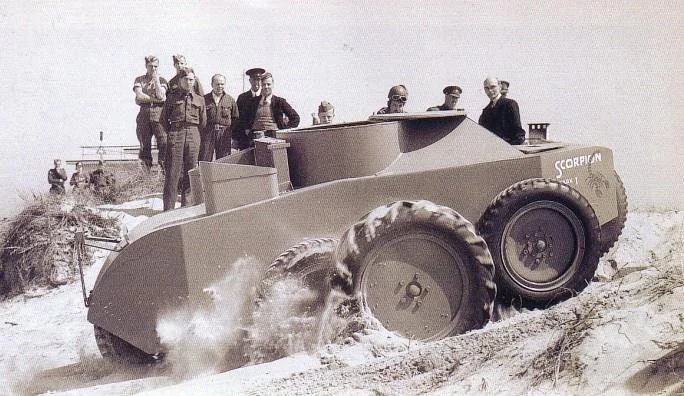
Opperman Scorpion during testing, May 1942

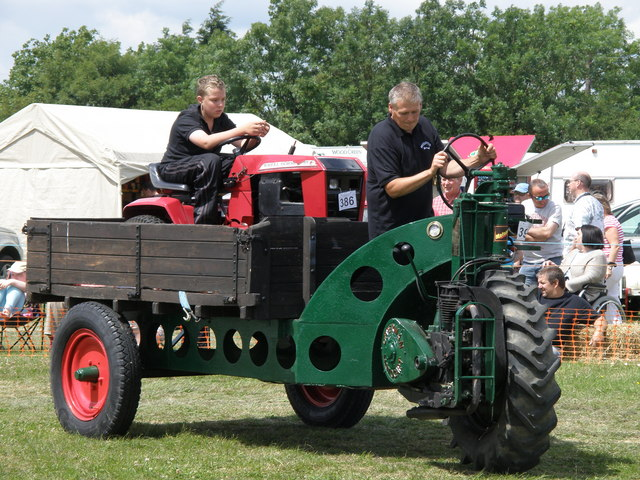
Opperman Motocart

== Stirling ==
Opperman Stirling
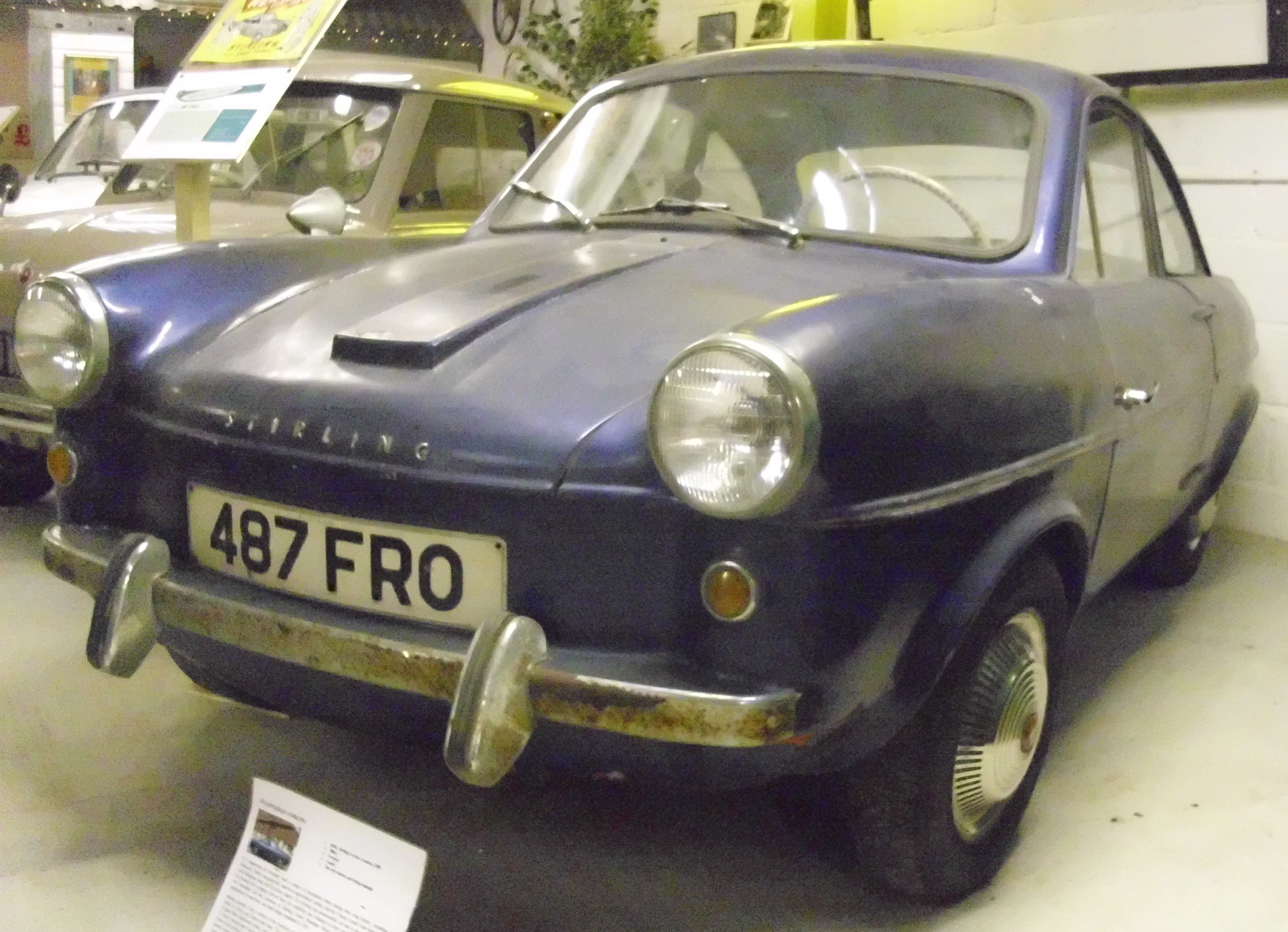

Overview
- Manufacturer: Opperman
- Production: 1958–1959 : 2 prototypes produced

Body and chassis
- Class: Microcar
- Body style: 2-door coupe

Powertrain
- Engine: Excelsior 424cc twin-cylinder 2-stroke (prototype #1); Steyr-Puch 493cc horizontally opposed twin-cylinder 4-stroke (prototype #2)
- Transmission: 4-speed manual (with reverse)

Dimensions
- Wheelbase: 78 in (1,981 mm)
- Length: 129 in (3,277 mm)
- Width: 59 in (1,499 mm)
- Height: 50 in (1,270 mm)
- Curb weight: 900–1,014 lb (408.2–460 kg)

Chronology
- Predecessor: Opperman Unicar

In hopes of broadening their market appeal, Opperman built a larger mid-engined coupe with a sporty body, which they debuted at the 1958 Earl's Court Motor Show. Compared to the Unicar, the new 'Stirling' featured things like 4-wheel independent suspension, winding windows, a 4-speed gearbox, a differential (made in-house by Opperman), and 7" hydraulic Girling drum brakes. The added size and refinement compared to the Unicar meant extra weight, with the first car weighing approximately 900 pounds (408 kg). To improve performance, Opperman made a number of modifications to the 328 cc Excelsior twin they had been using successfully in the Unicar. The modifications including things like a longer stroke crank (66 mm vs. 62 mm), larger cylinder bore (64 mm vs. 58 mm), increased compression (8:1 vs 7.5:1), and a larger carburetor. The results were promising, with the new 424 cc unit providing 25 bhp at 5,500 rpm, which was an increase of 7 bhp (~40%) over the standard 328 cc units. Opperman claimed that this drivetrain gave the Stirling a top speed of 70+ mph.

Perhaps Opperman foresaw problems with having to build these 424 cc motors for use in every Stirling, as the second car built featured an 'off-the-shelf' production engine; a 4-stroke, horizontally opposed twin-cylinder unit from Austrian manufacturer Steyr-Puch, displacing 493 cc and providing approximately 20 horsepower. So a bit less power and a notably heavier engine, but likely a more reliable option for the application, in the long run. This second Stirling was actually built with LHD controls, and it was tested extensively in Austria before being shipped back to England.

Having decided upon using this Steyr-Puch engine for production, Opperman made the plan of building an initial run of 50 cars without drivetrains in their workshop in the UK, and then they would be shipped to Austria to have the drivetrains fitted and tested in the cars. Unfortunately, production of the Stirling kept getting pushed back (some say due to supply issues caused by BMC, who were preparing to release their new Mini), and then later in 1959, Opperman was acquired by E.V. Industrials, who had no interest in continuing the production of automobiles.

With only 2 prototype Stirlings having been built, the project was abandoned, and the first car (with the 424 cc Excelsior) was sent to the company dump and destroyed. The second Stirling (with the 493 cc Steyr-Puch) returned from Austria a bit later, but as the company had already moved on with other projects, the car flew under the radar and avoided being destroyed. It later got sold off, and it still survives in the UK today.

== See also ==
- Opperman Motocart
