= Sair Anjum =

Danish cricketer

Personal information
- Full name: Sair Ahmed Nisar Anjum
- Born: 14 June 1990 (age 36); Copenhagen, Denmark
- Nickname: Anjii
- Batting: Right-handed
- Bowling: Right-arm medium

International information
- National side: Denmark

Career statistics
Competition	Twenty20
Matches	8
Runs scored	7
Batting average	3.50
100s/50s	–/–
Top score	4*
Balls bowled	157
Wickets	9
Bowling average	23.33
5 wickets in innings	–
10 wickets in match	–
Best bowling	2/15
Catches/stumpings	–/–
- Source: Cricinfo, 23 March 2012

Sair Ahmed Nisar Anjum (born 14 June 1990) is a Danish cricketer. Anjum is a right-handed batsman who bowls right-arm medium pace. He was born at Copenhagen.

Having represented Denmark at the Under-19 level, Anjum made his debut for the senior national team in the 2011 Nordic Cup against Finland, before playing in the European T20 Championship Division One which was held in Jersey and Guernsey.

In March 2012, Denmark took part in the World Twenty20 Qualifier in the United Arab Emirates, having qualified for the event by winning the European T20 Championship. Anjum was selected in Denmark's fourteen man squad for the qualifier, making his Twenty20 debut against Bermuda at the Sharjah Cricket Association Stadium. He made seven further appearances during the competition, the last of which came against Oman, taking 9 wickets in the competition at an average of 23.33, with best figures of 2/15.

In August 2012, he was selected in Denmark's fourteen man squad for the World Cricket League Division Four in Malaysia.
