= Aditya Mishra =

Indian-American cricketer (born 1981)

Personal information
- Full name: Aditya Mishra
- Born: 11 June 1981 (age 45); New Delhi, India
- Batting: Right-handed
- Bowling: Right-arm Legbreak googly
- Role: Batsman

International information
- National side: United States

Domestic team information
- Years: Team
- 2001/02: Karnataka
- Source: ESPNcricinfo, 11 May 2016

Aditya Mishra (born 11 June 1981 in New Delhi, India) is an Indian-born American cricketer who represents and played for the United States national cricket team. He was named vice-captain of 2012 ICC World Twenty20 Qualifier. He retired aged 31 with five List A and 8 Twenty20 to his name.
