= Valburga =

Valburga Sveta Valburga (until 1952)
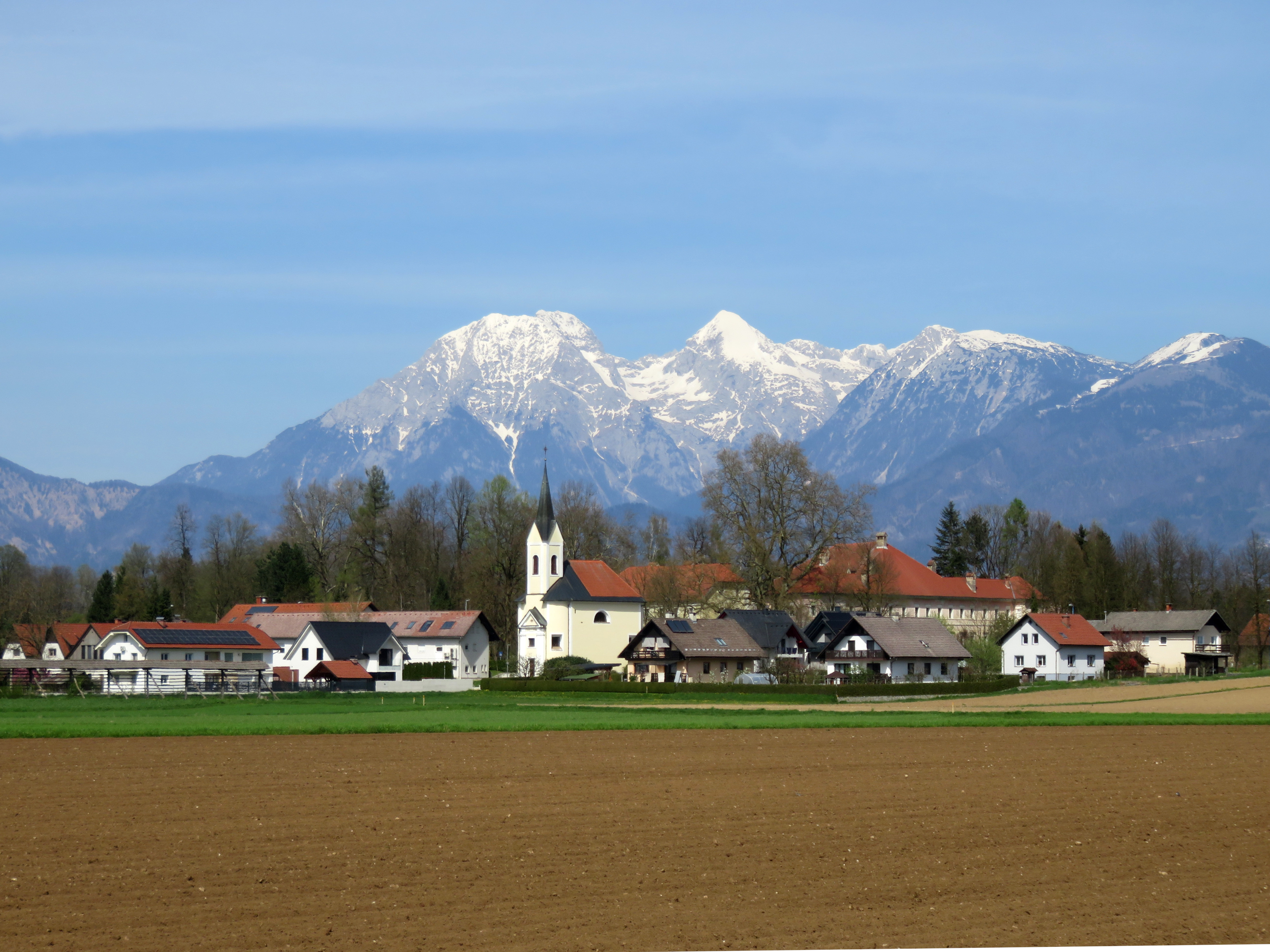

- Location in Slovenia
- Coordinates: 46°10′7.54″N 14°26′11.53″E
- Country: Slovenia
- Traditional region: Upper Carniola
- Statistical region: Upper Carniola
- Municipality: Medvode

Area
  - Total: 1.68 km^{2} (0.65 sq mi)
- Elevation: 356.6 m (1,170 ft)

Population (2002)
  - Total: 499

Valburga (pronounced [ʋalˈbuːɾɡa]; German: Sankt Walburga) is a settlement on the left bank of the Sava River in the Municipality of Medvode in the Upper Carniola region of Slovenia. It includes the hamlets of Plave and Na Mlaki.

== Name ==
Valburga was attested in written sources in 1324 as Sand Walpurch (and as Sand Walpurgen in 1327 and apud Sanctam Walpurgam in 1355). It is named after Saint Walpurga, the patron of the local church. Locally, the settlement is known as Šentomperga. The name of the settlement was changed from Sveta Valburga (literally, 'Saint Walpurga') to Valburga (literally, 'Walpurga') in 1952. The name was changed on the basis of the 1948 Law on Names of Settlements and Designations of Squares, Streets, and Buildings as part of efforts by Slovenia's postwar communist government to remove religious elements from toponyms. In the past the German name was Sankt Walburga.

== Church ==
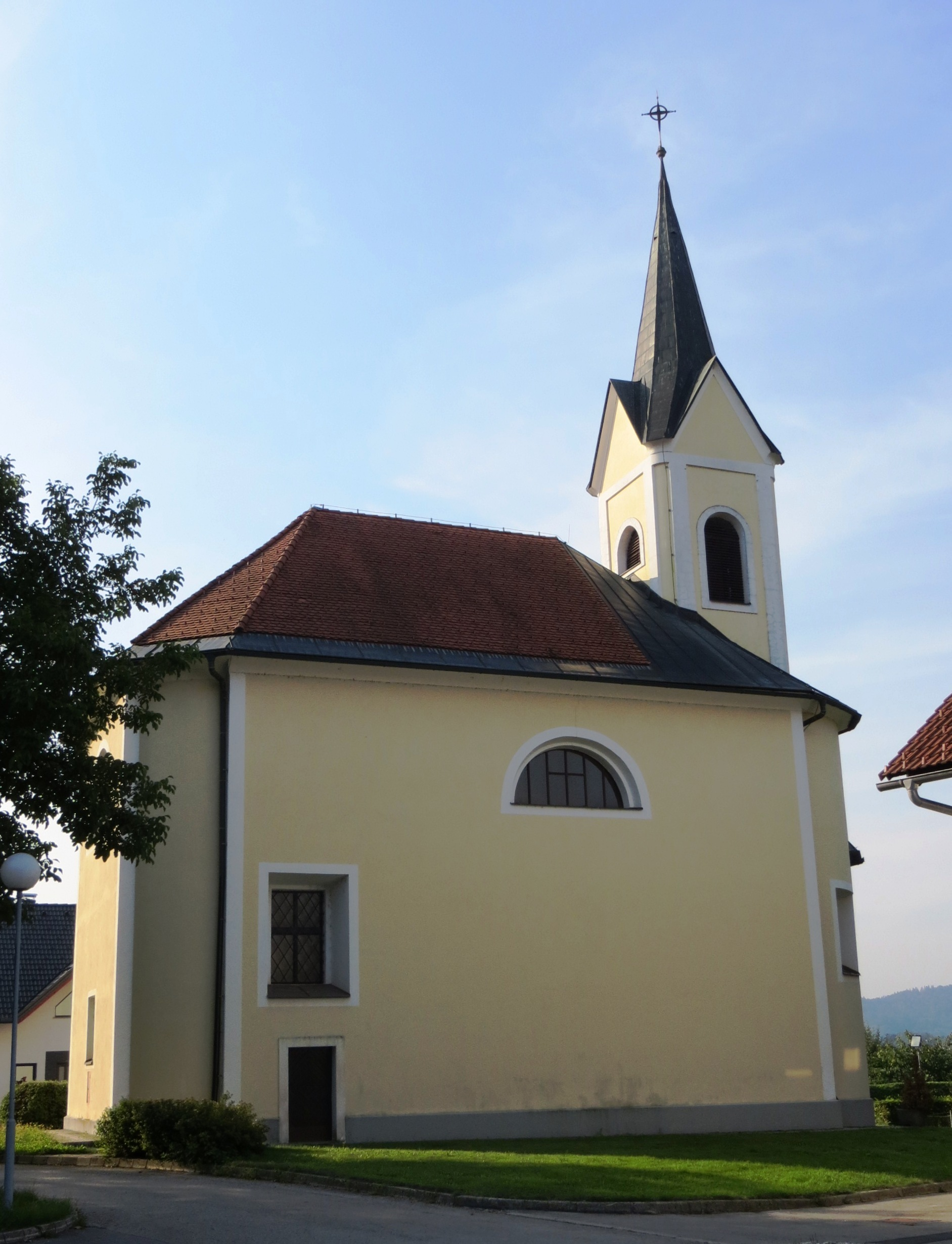
Saint Walpurga's Church

The local church is dedicated to Saint Walpurga. It stands at the northern end of the village and was first mentioned in written sources in the 14th century. The current building is a Baroque structure with a main altar dating from the mid-18th century. The side altars and the pulpit are late Baroque. The paintings of the Mount of Olives and the Way of the Cross displayed inside are by Leopold Layer (1752–1828), based on models by Giovanni Battista Tiepolo.

== Manor ==
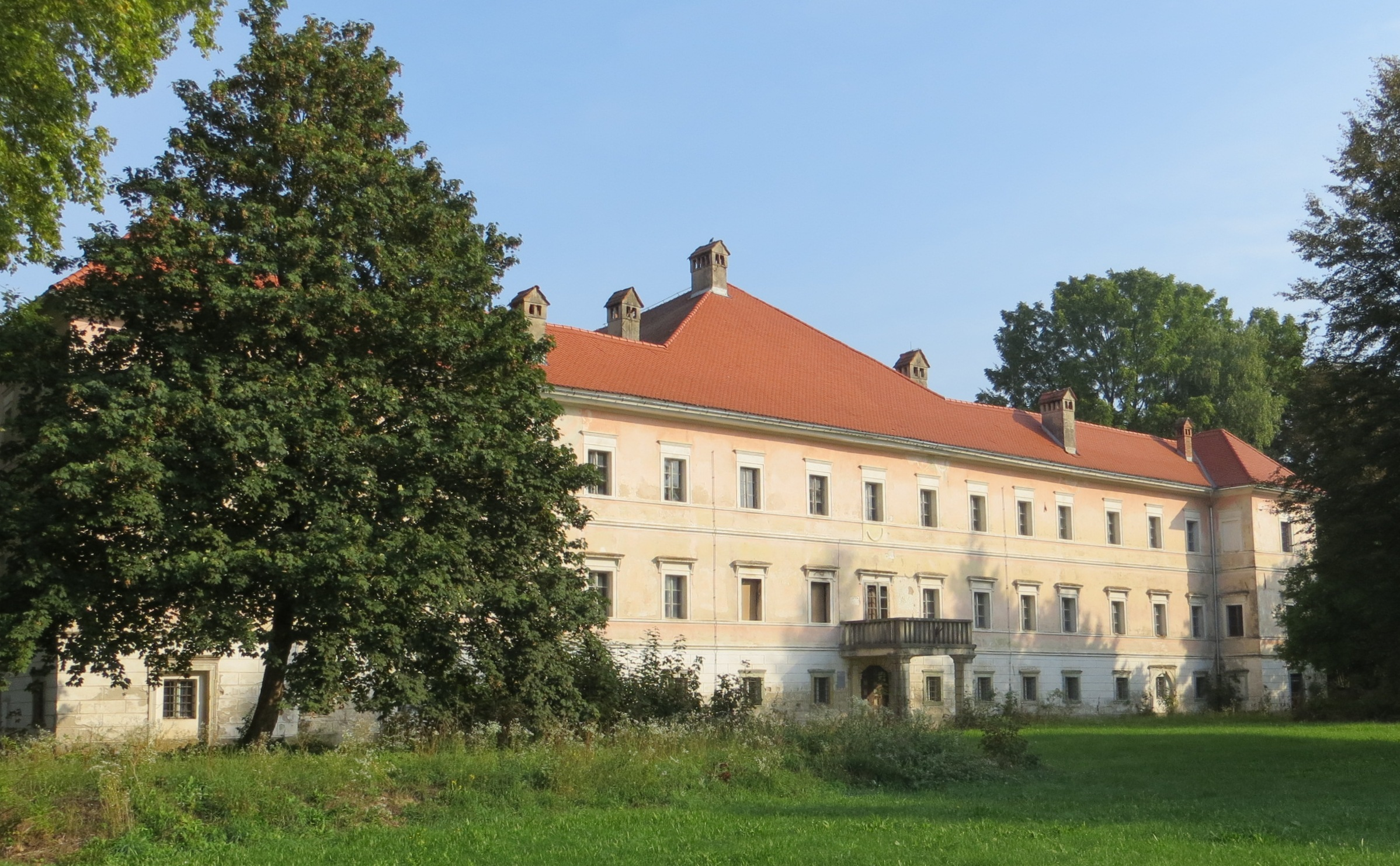
Lazzarini Manor

There is a large manor in the settlement, known as Lazzarini Manor (Slovene: Lazarinijeva graščina, Dvorec Lazarini), Smlednik Manor (Dvorec Smlednik, Grad Smlednik), or Valburga Manor (Dvorec Valburga). It was built in the 17th century. The main hall is painted with high-quality frescoes with mythological themes in the illusionist style. The painting in the chapel vault is believed to be by Anton Cebej. After the Second World War, the manor was seized by the state and nationalized; from 1946 to 1990 the building was used as a special needs school. The manor is being renovated after a fire in 2007 and is not open to the public.
