= Usman Shuja =

American cricketer (born 1978)

Personal information
- Born: 29 November 1978 (age 47); Karachi, Pakistan
- Batting: Right-handed
- Bowling: Right-arm fast-medium

International information
- National side: United States

Career statistics
Competition	Twenty20
Matches	11
Runs scored	36
Batting average	18
100s/50s	0/0
Top score	14
Balls bowled	200
Wickets	7
Bowling average	34.57
5 wickets in innings	0
10 wickets in match	0
Best bowling	3/39
Catches/stumpings	2/–
- Source: CricketArchive, 16 March 2018

Usman Shuja is an American former cricketer.

He was selected for ICC's Division 5 dream team in 2008. He also participated in the World Cup T20 Qualifiers in the UAE in 2010 and 2012. His best performance is against Scotland (3/39) in T20 format and against Norway (5/15) in 50 over format.

He led Central East team to the final of 2009 National championship. He made his Twenty20 debut on 9 February 2010, for the United States in the 2010 ICC World Twenty20 Qualifier in the United Arab Emirates.

In 2012 Shuja was selected as to be a part of the United States national cricket team at the 2012 ICC World Twenty20 Qualifier in the UAE in March 2012. Later in the same year he was selected for the 2012 ICC World Cricket League Division Four which took place from 3 to 10 September 2012 in Malaysia.

In May 2015, Shuja announced that he would retire from international cricket. In July 2018, he was named as one of the candidates for the first USA Cricket elections.

He served on the USA Cricket's board from 2018 to 2020 and in his professional life holds the position of chief executive officer of Bluebeam and Executive Board Member of Nemetschek.
