= Ian Opperman =

Namibian international cricketer (born 1989)

Personal information
- Born: 27 March 1989 (age 37); Gobabis, South-West Africa
- Batting: Right-handed
- Bowling: Right-arm off-spin

International information
- National side: Namibia (2012)
- Source: ESPNCricinfo, 9 April 2016

Ian Opperman (born 27 March 1989) is a Namibian international cricketer who made his debut for the Namibian national team in 2012. He is an all-rounder who bowls right-arm off-spin and bats right-handed.

Opperman was born in Gobabis, in Namibia's Omaheke Region. He attended South Africa's North-West University, representing the university's cricket team. Opperman made his debut for the Namibian national team in January 2012, in the CSA Provincial Competitions. His international debut came two months later, at the 2012 World Twenty20 Qualifier in the United Arab Emirates. He appeared in all nine of his team's matches, but had little part to play, batting in only four innings and bowling only 3.1 overs across the tournament. Later in 2012, Opperman also appeared in Namibia's Intercontinental Cup and WCL Championship matches against Canada and Kenya.
