= Dev Govindjee =

South African cricketer (born 1947)

Personal information
- Full name: Devdas Govindjee
- Born: 7 August 1947 (age 79)
- Source: Cricinfo, 4 January 2018

Dev Govindjee (born 7 August 1947) is a South African former cricketer. He played in 45 first-class matches for Eastern Province between 1971 and 1983. He is now a match referee for the International Cricket Council.
