= Ian James Oppermann =

Engineer, data scientist

Ian James Oppermann from the Commonwealth Scientific & Industrial Research Org. (CSIRO), Sydney, NSW, Australia was named Fellow of the Institute of Electrical and Electronics Engineers (IEEE) in 2012 for contributions to mobile communication systems.
