= List of Emiratis =

Notable United Arab Emirates nationals

This is a list of prominent Emirati people who are United Arab Emirates nationals.

== Royal families ==
=== Al Nahyan family (Al Nahyan royal family – Abu Dhabi) ===
- Sheikh Mohammad bin Zayed Al Nahyan – Ra'is (President) of UAE, Ruler of Abu Dhabi and Supreme Commander of the UAE Armed Forces
- The Late Sheikh Khalifa bin Zayed Al Nahyan – Second Ra'is (President) of UAE and former Ruler of Abu Dhabi
- Sheikh Sultan bin Zayed bin Sultan Al Nahyan – President's Representative
- Sheikh Hamdan bin Zayed bin Sultan Al Nahyan – Ruler's Representative in the Western Region of Abu Dhabi
- Sheikh Hamdan bin Mubarak Al Nahyan – Minister of Higher Education and Research Of Science
- Sheikh Mansour bin Zayed Al Nahyan – Deputy Prime Minister and Minister of Presidential Affairs
- Sheikh Abdullah Bin Zayed Al Nahyan – Minister of Foreign Affairs
- The Late Sheikh Zayed bin Sultan Al Nahyan – founding father of the United Arab Emirates and first Ra'is (President)
- Sheikha Fatima bint Mubarak Al Ketbi – referred to as the Mother of the United Arab Emirates

=== Al Maktoum royal family – Dubai ===
- The Late Sheikh Rashid bin Saeed Al Maktoum – Second Prime Minister of the UAE and founder of modern Dubai
- The Late Sheikh Maktoum bin Rashid Al Maktoum – First Prime Minister of the UAE
- Sheikh Mohammed bin Rashid Al Maktoum – Vice President & Prime Minister of UAE; Ruler of Dubai
- The Late Sheikh Hamdan bin Rashid Al Maktoum – Minister of Finance & Industry
- Sheikh Hamdan Bin Mohammed bin Rashid Al Maktoum – Crown Prince of Dubai, & Chairman of Dubai Executive Council

=== Al-Qasimi royal family – Sharjah ===
- Sheikh Sultan bin Muhammad Al-Qasimi – Ruler of Sharjah
- Sheikha Lubna Al Qasimi – Minister of Foreign Trade

=== Al-Qasimi royal family – Ras al-Khaimah ===
- Sheikh Saud bin Saqr al Qasimi – Ruler of RAK

=== Al Nuaimi royal family – Ajman ===
- Sheikh Humaid bin Rashid Al Nuaimi III – Ruler of Ajman
- Sheikh Ammar bin Humaid Al Nuaimi – Crown Prince of Ajman
- Sheikh Rashid Bin Humaid Al Nuaimi IV

=== Al Sharqi royal family – Fujairah ===
- Sheikh Hamad bin Mohammed Al Sharqi – Ruler of Fujairah
- Sheikh Mohammed bin Hamad bin Mohammed Al Sharqi – Crown Prince of Fujairah

=== Al-Mualla royal family – Umm Al Quwain ===
- Sheikh Saud bin Rashid Al Mualla – Ruler of Umm Al Quwain
- Sheikh Rashid bin Saud bin Rashid Al Mualla – Crown Prince of Umm Al Quwain

== Council of Ministers ==
- Sheikh Maktoum bin Mohammed bin Rashid Al Maktoum – Minister of Finance
- Lt-General Sheikh Saif bin Zayed Al Nahyan – Minister of Interior
- Sheikh Mansour bin Zayed Al Nahyan – Minister of Presidential Affairs
- Sheikh Abdullah bin Zayed Al Nahyan – Minister of Foreign Affairs
- Sheikh Nahyan bin Mubarak Al Nahyan – Minister of Tolerance
- Rashid Ahmad Muhammad Bin Fahad – Minister of Environment and Water
- Reem Al Hashimi – Minister of State and managing director for the Dubai World Expo 2020 Bid Committee
- Mohammed Al Gergawi – Minister of Cabinet Affairs in the Federal Government of the United Arab Emirates
- Noura Al Kaabi – Minister of Culture and Knowledge Development and former member of the Federal National Council (15th and 16th Legislative Terms)

== Other Federal Government Officials ==
- Lubna Khalid Al Qasimi – former Minister and former Speaker of the Federal National Council
- Hawaa Saaed Al Thahak Al Mansoori – Member of the Federal National Council
- Jouan Salem Al Dhaheri – Secretary-General and Member of Abu Dhabi National Oil Company (ADNOC)
- Khalifa Shaheen Al Marar – Minister of State and former United Arab Emirates Ambassador to Iran
- Saeed Khalifa Humeid Al Rumaithi – former secretary of the Ministry of Labor in Abu Dhabi

== Businessmen ==
- Ahmed bin Saeed Al Maktoum – CEO of the airline Emirates
- Hussain Sajwani – CEO, Damac (real estate)
- Ahmad Ali Al Sayegh – CEO, Dolphin Energy Limited (UAE)
- Abdul Aziz Al Ghurair – banker, chairman, MashreqBank, former president of the Federal National Council, prominent businessman and among Forbes List of Billionaires
- Majid Al Futtaim – Majid Al Futtaim & Co, prominent billionaire businessman
- Mohammed bin Ali Al Abbar – chairman, Emaar and director, Dubai Economic Department
- Saif Ahmad Al Ghurair – UAE, Al-Ghurair Group CEO
- Suhail Galadari – UAE, Director, Khaleej Times
- Sultan Ahmed bin Sulayem – chairman and CEO of DP World
- Mohammad Al Gaz – chairman, United Arab Agencies
- Mohamed Juma Al Shamisi – CEO, Abu Dhabi Ports Company (ADPC)
- Juma al Majid – businessman – CEO and founder of Juma al majid holding groups
- Issa bin Zayed Al Nahyan – businessman and relative of the royal family
- Abdulraheem Al Masaood – son of Mahmoud Al Masaood; businessman and relative of the royal family prominent billionaire businessman resides in Canada

== Businesswomen ==
- Amina Al Rustamani – chief executive officer of AWR Properties, director and board member of the family-owned AW Rostamani Group
- Hend Faisal Al Qassemi – businesswoman, author and journalist
- Muna Al Gurg – Managing director of Retail at Easa Saleh Al Gurg Group
- Her Excellency Dr. Shaikha Ali Salem Al Maskari – Chairperson of Al Maskari Holding (AMH), Emirates & Al Maskari Holdings, and Tricon Energy Operations

== Medicine ==
- Dr. Ali Al Numairy – first Emirati plastic surgeon
- Dr. Moza Sultan Al Kaabi – first Emirati woman orthopedic surgeon.

== Astronauts ==
- Hazza Al Mansouri – first Emirati in space and first Arab to board the International Space Station
- Sultan Al Neyadi – second of the two first Emirati astronauts
- Nora Al Matrooshi – second group of astronauts.
- Mohammad Al Mulla – second group of astronauts.

== Arts and entertainment ==
- Amal Al-Agroobi – famous Emirati film director
- Abdul Qader Al Raes – famous Emirati painter
- Ousha the Poet – famous Nabati poet
- Mehad Hamad
- Najat Makki
- Wafa Hasher Al Maktoum
- Mohammed Kazem
- Hussain Sharif
- Ebtisam Abdulaziz
- Abdullah Al Saadi
- Mohammed Ahmed Ibrahim
- Mattar Bin Lahej
- Moosa Al Halyan
- Abdulraheem Salim
- Ihab Darwish – famous Emirati composer and founder of Emirati Musicians' Association

== Innovations ==
- Reem Al Marzouqi

== Sports ==
=== Cricketers ===
- Ali Asad Abbas
- Arshad Ali
- Asghar Ali
- Asim Saeed
- Mohammad Aslam (UAE cricketer)
- Shaukat Dukanwala
- Fahad Usman
- Mazhar Hussain
- Kashif Ahmed
- Khurram Khan
- Arshad Laeeq
- Rizwan Latif
- Ganesh Mylvaganam
- Naeemuddin
- Riaz Poonawala
- Suhail Galadari
- Abdul Rehman (UAE cricketer)
- Azhar Saeed
- Saeed-Al-Saffar
- Johanne Samarasekera
- Sameer Zia
- Shehzad Altaf
- Sohail Butt
- Syed Maqsood
- Sultan Zarawani

=== ODI cricketers ===
- Imtiaz Abbasi
- Ali Asad Abbas
- Arshad Ali
- Asghar Ali
- Asim Saeed
- Mohammad Aslam (UAE cricketer)
- Shaukat Dukanwala
- Fahad Usman
- Mazhar Hussain
- Khurram Khan
- Arshad Laeeq
- Rizwan Latif
- Mohammad Ishaq
- Ganesh Mylvaganam
- Naeemuddin
- Riaz Poonawala
- Ramveer Rai
- Saleem Raza (cricketer)
- Abdul Rehman (UAE cricketer)
- Azhar Saeed
- Saeed-Al-Saffar
- Johanne Samarasekera
- Sameer Zia
- Shehzad Altaf
- Sohail Butt
- Syed Maqsood
- Mohammad Tauqeer
- Sultan Zarawani

=== Bowlers ===
- Rizwan Latif
- Sameer Zia
- Syed Maqsood

=== Footballers ===
- Abdulrahman Al-Haddad
- Álvaro de Oliveira
- Adli Mohamed
- Adel Al-Hosani
- Adel Mohammed
- Adnan Al-Talyani
- Ahmed Al-Attas
- Ahmed Barman
- Ahmed Khalil
- Ala Zhir
- Ali Al-Saadi
- Ali Al-Wehaibi
- Ali Khasif
- Ali Mabkhout
- Ali Saleh
- Ali Thani Jumaa
- Amer Abdulrahman
- Abdullah Al-Naqbi
- Abdullah Musa
- Abdullah Ramadan
- Abdulqadir Hassan
- Abdullah Suhail
- Abdulrahman Ibrahim
- Abdulrahman Saleh
- Abdulaziz Mohamed
- Abdulla Hamad
- Abdulla Idrees
- Bader Nasser
- Bandar Al-Ahbabi
- Bruno
- Bakheet Saad Mubarak
- Caio Canedo
- Caio Lucas
- Cartabia
- Erik
- Fahad Badr
- Fábio Lima
- Faris Khalil
- Fahad Al-Dhanhani
- Faisal Khalil
- Fares Jumaa
- Fahad Abdulrahman
- Fahad Khamees
- Gastón Suárez
- Gustavo Alemão
- Habib Al Fardan
- Hamad Al-Balooshi
- Hamad Al-Meqbaali
- Hamdan Al-Kamali
- Hassan Mubarak
- Harib Abdalla
- Hussain Ghuloum
- Ismail Ahmed
- Ismail Al Hammadi
- Isam Faiz
- Ismail Rashid Ismail
- Ismail Matar
- Ibrahim Meer
- Juma Rashed
- Jassim Yaqoob
- Junior Ndiaye
- Jonatas Santos
- Khaled Ibrahim
- Khalid Al-Baloushi
- Khalid Eisa
- Khalid Al-Hashemi
- Khalifa Al Hammadi
- Khalfan Al-Shamsi
- Khaled Ibrahim
- Khaled Tawhid
- Khalil Ibrahim (footballer)
- Kouame Autonne
- Luanzinho
- Lithierry Silva
- Hassan Mohamed (footballer)
- Hassan Mohammed (footballer)
- Mahmoud Khamees
- Majed Hassan
- Majed Naser
- Majid Rashid
- Mackenzie Hunt
- Mansoor Al-Menhali
- Marcus Meloni
- Matías Palacios
- Mohammed Abdulbasit
- Mohamed Omer
- Mohamed Al-Shamsi
- Mohamed Awadh-Allah
- Mohammed Abbas
- Mohammed Abdulrahman
- Mohammed Al-Attas
- Mohammed Al-Menhali
- Mohammed Jumaa
- Mohammed Marzooq
- Mohammed Rabii
- Munther Ali Abdullah
- Nasser Khamis
- Nicolás Giménez
- Omar Abdulrahman
- Rashed Ahmed
- Richard Akonnor
- Rúben Canedo
- Saeed Al-Kathiri
- Saeed Juma
- Salim Saleh
- Saile Souza
- Saša Ivković
- Sebastián Tagliabúe
- Shahin Abdulrahman
- Solomon Sosu
- Sultan Adil
- Sultan Al-Shamsi
- Tahnoon Al-Zaabi
- Yahya Al Ghassani
- Yahya Nader
- Yousif Jaber
- Yousif Al-Zaabi
- Yousuf Hussain
- Zayed Al-Ameri
- Zayed Sultan
- Zuhair Bakheet
- Eissa Meer
- Mubarak Ghanim
- Sultan Al-Mantheri
- Yuri Cesar
- Mohammed Bu Sanda
- Abdullah Ali Sultan

=== Rally drivers ===
- Khalid Al Qassimi
- Mohammed Ben Sulayem

=== Sport shooters ===
- Ahmad Mohammad Hasher Al Maktoum
- Saif Bin Futtais

=== Other ===
- Sheikh Ahmad Mohammad Hasher Al Maktoum – ace-shooter and Olympic medalist
- Sheikha Maitha bint Mohammed bin Rashid Al Maktoum – karate and taekwondo practitioner
- Elham Al Qasimi – first Arab woman to reach the North Pole
- Sergiu Toma – Judoka and Olympic medalist
- Hamda Taryam Al Shamsi – Professional drag racer, Philanthropist and Businesswoman
- Khamzat Chimaev – professional mixed martial artist and freestyle wrestler

== Politics ==
- Ahmad Al Tayer
- Ali bin Abdulla Al Kaabi
- Saeed Mohammad Al Gandi
- Khalifa bin Zayed Al Nahyan
- Maktoum bin Rashid Al Maktoum
- Mohammed bin Rashid Al Maktoum
- Rashid bin Saeed Al Maktoum
- Mansour bin Zayed Al Nahyan
- Mohammad bin Zayed Al Nahyan
- Nahyan bin Mubarak Al Nahyan
- Lubna Khalid Al Qasimi
- Rashid ibn Abdullah Al Nuaimi
- Shakhbut Bin-Sultan Al Nahyan
- Abdullah bin Zayed Al Nahyan
- Sheikh Nahayan Mabarak Al Nahayan
- Sultan bin Zayed bin Sultan Al Nahyan
- Ahmed bin Mahmoud Al Blooshi
- Sultan bin Saeed Al Mansoori
- Anwar Gargash

== Writers ==
- Dubai Abulhoul Alfalasi
- Maryam Alzoaby
- Afra Atiq
- Nasser Al-Dhaheri
- Salha Ghabish
- Suad Jawad
- Adel Khozam
- Hessa Al Muhairi
- Shaykha al-Nakhi
- Nadia Al Najjar
- Noura al Noman
- Alia Al Shamsi author, poet, curator and photographer
- Salha Obaid
- Maryam Saqer Al Qasimi
- Dr. Basema Younis

== See also ==
- Emiratis
- United Arab Emirates
