= United Arab Emirates at the Cricket World Cup =

UAE cricket team history at ICC Men's World Cup Events

In the United Arab Emirates, cricket had a very limited presence in the 19th and most of the 20th century. In less than a decade after independence in December 1971, the massive influx of South Asians migrant workers increased crickets popularity. After the establishment of the Emirates Cricket Board in 1989, the United Arab Emirates officially became an affiliate member of the International Cricket Council. In the following year, the UAE became an associate member, with the likes of Kenya. In 1996, the UAE competed in the Cricket World Cup, with their debut along with Kenya and The Netherlands making them the 14th team to compete at the World Cup.

== Cricket World Cup Record ==
| Cricket World Cup record | | | | | | | | | Qualification record | | | | |
| Year | Round | Position | Pld | W | L | T | NR | Captain | Pld | W | L | T | NR |
|---|---|---|---|---|---|---|---|---|---|---|---|---|---|
| (England) 1975 | Not eligible – not an ICC member | | | | | | | | No qualifiers held | | | | |
| (England) 1979 | Not eligible – not an ICC member | | | | | | | | Did not enter (Not an ICC member) | | | | |
| (England) 1983 | Not eligible – not an ICC member | | | | | | | | Did not enter (Not an ICC member) | | | | |
| (India) (Pakistan) 1987 | Not eligible – not an ICC member | | | | | | | | Did not enter (Not an ICC member) | | | | |
| (Australia) (New Zealand) 1992 | Did not qualify | | | | | | | | Did not enter | | | | |
| (India) (Pakistan) (Sri Lanka) 1996 | Group Stage | 11/12 | 5 | 1 | 4 | 0 | 0 | Sultan Zarawani | 9 | 9 | 0 | 0 | 0 |
| (England) (Scotland) (Republic of Ireland) (Netherlands) 1999 | Did not qualify | | | | | | | | 7 | 4 | 3 | 0 | 0 |
| (South Africa) (Zimbabwe) (Kenya) 2003 | Did not qualify | | | | | | | | 10 | 6 | 4 | 0 | 0 |
| (Cricket West Indies) 2007 | Did not qualify | | | | | | | | 7 | 3 | 3 | 0 | 1 |
| (India) (Bangladesh) (Sri Lanka) 2011 | Did not qualify | | | | | | | | 16 | 11 | 5 | 0 | 0 |
| (Australia) (New Zealand) 2015 | Group Stage | 13/14 | 6 | 0 | 6 | 0 | 0 | Mohammad Tauqir | 28 | 21 | 7 | 0 | 0 |
| (England) (Wales) 2019 | Did not qualify | | | | | | | | 27 | 12 | 15 | 0 | 0 |
| (India) 2023 | Did not qualify | | | | | | | | 47 | 20 | 24 | 1 | 2 |
| Total | 0 titles | 2/13 | 11 | 1 | 10 | 0 | 0 | — | 151 | 86 | 61 | 1 | 3 |

=== World Cup Record (By Team) ===
Cricket World Cup matches (By team)
Total : 1 Win – 0 Ties – 10 Loses – 11 games played
| Against | Wins | Draws | Losses | Total |
|---|---|---|---|---|
| England | 0 | 0 | 1 | 1 |
| Ireland | 0 | 0 | 1 | 1 |
| India | 0 | 0 | 1 | 1 |
| Netherlands | 1 | 0 | 0 | 1 |
| New Zealand | 0 | 0 | 1 | 1 |
| Pakistan | 0 | 0 | 2 | 2 |
| South Africa | 0 | 0 | 2 | 2 |
| West Indies | 0 | 0 | 1 | 1 |
| Zimbabwe | 0 | 0 | 1 | 1 |

== Tournament history ==
=== 1996 Cricket World Cup ===
The United Arab Emirates was placed in Group B along with South Africa, Pakistan, New Zealand, England and The Netherlands. They were first up against South Africa, which batted first and posted a score of 321/2. The UAE were restricted to just 152/8 from 50 overs, with Arshad Laeeq top scoring with 43.

The UAE next played against England batting first. The top order collapsed and the UAE were bowled out for 136 from 48.3 overs. England cruised to victory in 35 overs. They next played co-hosts Pakistan. Batting first, they slumped to 109/9 from 33 overs. The opponent won by 9 wickets in just 18 overs.

Down and out, the UAE next played New Zealand, who batted first. New Zealand posted 276/8 from 47 overs. The Emiratis again failed to cross 200, posting 167/9. For their last game, the United Arab Emirates faced fellow associate The Netherlands. After batting first, The Netherlands posted a modest score of 216/9 from their 50 overs, with Shaukat Dukanwala taking 5/29. The UAE replied with confidence, winning by 7 wickets.

Squad

- Sultan Zarawani (c)
- Saeed-Al-Saffar (vc)
- Imtiaz Abbasi (wk)
- Vijay Mehra (wk)
- Saleem Raza
- Johanne Samarasekera
- Shaukat Dukanwala
- Shahzad Altaf
- Azhar Saeed
- Arshad Laeeq
- Mazhar Hussain
- Mohammad Ishaq
- Mohammad Aslam
- Ganesh Mylvaganam

Results

| Group stage (Group B) | | | | | | Quarterfinal | Semifinal | Final | Overall Result |
| Opposition Result | Opposition Result | Opposition Result | Opposition Result | Opposition Result | Rank | Opposition Result | Opposition Result | Opposition Result | Overall Result |
|---|---|---|---|---|---|---|---|---|---|
| South Africa; L by 169 runs | England; L by 8 wickets | Pakistan; L by 9 wickets | New Zealand; L by 109 runs | Netherlands; W by 7 wickets | 5 | Did not advance | | | Group stage |

Scorecards

Group stage (Group B)

16 February
Scorecard

| South Africa; 321/2 (50 overs) | v | United Arab Emirates; 152/8 (50 overs) |
| Gary Kirsten 188* (159); Johanne Samarasekera 1/39 (9 overs) | | Arshad Laeeq 43 (79); Brian McMillan 3/11 (8 overs) |

South Africa won by 169 runs
Rawalpindi Cricket Stadium, Rawalpindi
Umpires: Steve Bucknor and V.K. Ramaswamy
Player of the match: Gary Kirsten (SA)

18 February
Scorecard

| United Arab Emirates; 136 (48.3 overs) | v | England; 140/2 (35 overs) |
| Mazhar Hussain 33 (59); Neil Smith 3/29 | | Graham Thorpe 44* (66); Arshad Laeeq 1/25 (7 overs) |

England won by 8 wickets
Arbab Niaz Stadium, Peshawar
Umpires: B.C. Cooray and V.K. Ramaswamy
Player of the match: Neil Smith (Eng)

24 February
Scorecard

| United Arab Emirates; 109/9 (33 overs) | v | Pakistan; 112/1 (18 overs) |
| Shaukat Dukanwala 21* (19); Mushtaq Ahmed 3/16 (7 overs) | | Ijaz Ahmed 50* (57); Johanne Samarasekera 1/17 (3 overs) |

Pakistan won by 9 wickets
Jinnah Stadium, Gujranwala
Umpires: B.C. Cooray and Srinivas Venkataraghavan
Player of the match: Mushtaq Ahmed (Pak)

27 February
Scorecard

| New Zealand; 276/8 (47 overs) | v | United Arab Emirates; 167/9 (47 overs) |
| Roger Twose 92 (112); Azhar Saeed 3/45 (7 overs) | | Johanne Samarasekera 47 (59); Shane Thomson 3/20 |

New Zealand won by 109 runs
Iqbal Stadium, Faisalabad
Umpires: B.C. Cooray and Srinivas Venkataraghavan
Player of the match: Roger Twose (NZ)

- Match reduced to 47 overs a side due to heavy fog at the start of the match.

1 March
Scorecard

| Netherlands; 216/9 (50 overs) | v | United Arab Emirates; 220/3 (44.2 overs) |
| Peter Cantrell 47 (106); Shaukat Dukanwala 5/29 (10 overs) | | Saleem Raza 84 (68); Roland Lefebvre 1/24 (8 overs) |

United Arab Emirates won by 7 wickets
Gaddafi Stadium, Lahore
Umpires: Mahboob Shah and Steve Randell
Player of the match: Shaukat Dukanwala (UAE)

- This was the first ever official ODI between two ICC Associate teams.

=== 2015 Cricket World Cup ===
Squad

- Mohammad Tauqir (c)
- Khurram Khan
- Shaiman Anwar
- Amjad Javed
- Swapnil Patil (wk)
- Rohan Mustafa
- Nasir Aziz
- Krishna Chandran
- Mohammad Naveed
- Manjula Guruge
- Kamran Shazad
- Fahad Al Hashmi
- Amjad Ali
- Andri Berenger
- Saqlain Haider (wk)

Results

| Pool stage (Pool B) | | | | | | | Quarterfinal | Semifinal | Final | Overall Result |
| Opposition Result | Opposition Result | Opposition Result | Opposition Result | Opposition Result | Opposition Result | Rank | Opposition Result | Opposition Result | Opposition Result | Overall Result |
|---|---|---|---|---|---|---|---|---|---|---|
| Zimbabwe; L by 4 wickets | Ireland; L by 2 wickets | India; L by 9 wickets | Pakistan; L by 129 runs | South Africa; L by 146 runs | West Indies; L by 6 wickets | 7 | Did not advance | | | Pool stage |

Scorecards

Pool stage (Pool B)

19 February
11:00 (NZDT)
Scorecard

| United Arab Emirates; 285/7 (50 overs) | v | Zimbabwe; 286/6 (48 overs) |
| Shaiman Anwar 67 (50); Tendai Chatara 3/42 (10 overs) | | Sean Williams 76* (65); Mohammad Tauqir 2/51 (9 overs) |

Zimbabwe won by 4 wickets
Saxton Oval, Nelson
Umpires: Johan Cloete (SA) and Chris Gaffaney (NZ)
Player of the match: Sean Williams (Zim)

- Zimbabwe won the toss and elected to field.
- The United Arab Emirates posted their highest ever ODI innings total.

25 February
13:30 (AEST) (D/N)
Scorecard

| United Arab Emirates; 278/9 (50 overs) | v | Ireland; 279/8 (49.2 overs) |
| Shaiman Anwar 106 (83); Paul Stirling 2/27 (10 overs) | | Gary Wilson 80 (69); Amjad Javed 3/53 (9 overs) |

Ireland won by 2 wickets
Brisbane Cricket Ground, Brisbane
Umpires: Michael Gough (Eng) and Nigel Llong (Eng)
Player of the match: Gary Wilson (Ire)

- Ireland won the toss and elected to field.
- Shaiman Anwar became the first UAE player to score a century in a World Cup game.
- The 107-run partnership between Shaiman Anwar and Amjad Javed was the highest seventh-wicket partnership in World Cup history.

28 February
14:30 (AWST) (D/N)
Scorecard

| United Arab Emirates; 102 (31.3 overs) | v | India; 104/1 (18.5 overs) |
| Shaiman Anwar 35 (49); Ravichandran Ashwin 4/25 (10 overs) | | Rohit Sharma 57* (55); Mohammad Naveed 1/35 (5 overs) |

India won by 9 wickets
WACA Ground, Perth
Umpires: Billy Bowden (NZ) and Michael Gough (Eng)
Player of the match: Ravichandran Ashwin (Ind)

- United Arab Emirates won the toss and elected to bat.

4 March
14:00 (NZDT) (D/N)
Scorecard

| Pakistan; 339/6 (50 overs) | v | United Arab Emirates; 210/8 (50 overs) |
| Ahmed Shehzad 93 (105); Manjula Guruge 4/56 (8 overs) | | Shaiman Anwar 62 (88); Shahid Afridi 2/35 (10 overs) |

Pakistan won by 129 runs
McLean Park, Napier
Umpires: Johan Cloete (SA) and Sundaram Ravi (Ind)
Player of the match: Ahmed Shehzad (Pak)

- United Arab Emirates won the toss and elected to field.
- Shahid Afridi became the fourth Pakistan player to score 8,000 runs in ODI matches.

12 March
14:00 (NZDT) (D/N)
Scorecard

| South Africa; 341/6 (50 overs) | v | United Arab Emirates; 195 (47.3 overs) |
| AB de Villiers 99 (82); Mohammad Naveed 3/63 (10 overs) | | Swapnil Patil 57* (100); AB de Villiers 2/15 (3 overs) |

South Africa won by 146 runs
Wellington Regional Stadium, Wellington
Umpires: Steve Davis (Aus) and Rod Tucker (Aus)
Player of the match: AB de Villiers (SA)

- United Arab Emirates won the toss and elected to field.
- AB de Villiers now holds the records for the most sixes in one World Cup tournament (20) and the most sixes in all World Cup matches (36).
- South Africa qualified for the quarter-finals as a result of this match.

15 March
11:00 (NZDT)
Scorecard

| United Arab Emirates; 175 (47.4 overs) | v | West Indies; 176/4 (30.3 overs) |
| Nasir Aziz 60 (86); Jason Holder 4/27 (10 overs) | | Johnson Charles 55 (40); Amjad Javed 2/29 (8 overs) |

West Indies won by 6 wickets
McLean Park, Napier
Umpires: Aleem Dar (Pak) and Ranmore Martinesz (SL)
Player of the match: Jason Holder (WI)

- West Indies won the toss and elected to field.
- Shaiman Anwar (UAE) became the highest run-scorer by a player from an Associate nation in a World Cup.
- Amjad Javed and Nasir Aziz's 107-run partnership for the seventh wicket is a World Cup record and a UAE record for any wicket against a Test nation.

== Records and statistics ==
=== Team records ===
Highest innings totals

| Score | Opponent | Venue | Season |
|---|---|---|---|
| 285/7 (50 overs) | Zimbabwe | Nelson | 2015 |
| 279/9 (50 overs) | Ireland | Brisbane | 2015 |
| 220/3 (44.2 overs) | Netherlands | Lahore | 1996 |
| 210/8 (50 overs) | Pakistan | Napier | 2015 |
| 195 (47.3 overs) | South Africa | Wellington | 2015 |
Last updated: 15 March 2015

=== Most appearances ===
This list consists players with most number of matches at the Cricket World Cup. - Eight players share the record for most matches played, with 6 each. Mohammad Tauqir has captained the team in 6 matches, the most matches as captain for UAE.

| Matches | Player | Period |
|---|---|---|
| 6 | Amjad Ali | 2015–2015 |
| 6 | Amjad Javed | 2015–2015 |
| 6 | Andri Berenger | 2015–2015 |
| 6 | Khurram Khan | 2015–2015 |
| 6 | Mohammad Naveed | 2015–2015 |
| 6 | Mohammad Tauqir | 2015–2015 |
| 6 | Swapnil Patil | 2015–2015 |
| 6 | Shaiman Anwar | 2015–2015 |
Last updated: 15 March 2015

=== Batting statistics ===
Most runs

| Runs | Player | Mat | Inn | Avg | 100s | 50s | Period |
|---|---|---|---|---|---|---|---|
| 311 | Shaiman Anwar | 6 | 6 | 51.83 | 1 | 2 | 2015–2015 |
| 170 | Amjad Javed | 6 | 6 | 34.00 | —N/a | 1 | 2015–2015 |
| 155 | Khurram Khan | 6 | 6 | 25.83 | —N/a | —N/a | 2015–2015 |
| 140 | Swapnil Patil | 6 | 6 | 28.00 | —N/a | 1 | 2015–2015 |
| 137 | Saleem Raza | 4 | 4 | 34.25 | —N/a | 1 | 1996–1996 |
Last updated: 15 March 2015

Highest individual innings

| Score | Player | Opponent | Venue | Season |
|---|---|---|---|---|
| 106 | Shaiman Anwar | Ireland | Brisbane | 2015 |
| 84 | Saleem Raza | Netherlands | Lahore | 1996 |
| 67 | Shaiman Anwar | Zimbabwe | Nelson | 2015 |
| 62 | Shaiman Anwar | Pakistan | Napier | 2015 |
| 60 | Nasir Aziz | West Indies | Napier | 2015 |
Last updated: 15 March 2015

Highest partnerships

| Runs | Players | Opposition | Venue | Season |
|---|---|---|---|---|
| 117 (1st wicket) | Saleem Raza & Azhar Saeed | v Netherlands | Lahore | 1996 |
| 107 (7th wicket) | Shaiman Anwar (56) & Amjad Javed (42) | v Ireland | Brisbane | 2015 |
| 107 (7th wicket) | Nasir Aziz (60) & Amjad Javed (43) | v West Indies | Napier | 2015 |
| 83 (4th wicket) | Shaiman Anwar (42) & Khurram Khan (39) | v Pakistan | Napier | 2015 |
| 82* (4th wicket) | Mohammad Ishaq & Vijay Mehra | v Netherlands | Lahore | 1996 |
Last updated: 15 March 2015

=== Bowling statistics ===
Most wickets

| Wickets | Player | Matches | Avg. | Econ. | 4W | 5W | Period |
|---|---|---|---|---|---|---|---|
| 8 | Mohammad Naveed | 6 | 38.37 | 6.09 | 0 | 0 | 2015–2015 |
| 7 | Manjula Guruge | 4 | 19.42 | 4.77 | 1 | 0 | 2015–2015 |
| 7 | Amjad Javed | 6 | 44.71 | 6.52 | 0 | 0 | 2015–2015 |
| 6 | Shaukat Dukanwala | 5 | 25.50 | 4.63 | 0 | 1 | 1996–1996 |
| 6 | Azhar Saeed | 5 | 26.16 | 5.06 | 0 | 0 | 1996–1996 |
Last updated: 15 March 2015

Best bowling figures

| Bowling Figures | Overs | Player | Opponent | Venue | Season |
|---|---|---|---|---|---|
| 5/29 | 10.0 | Shaukat Dukanwala | v Netherlands | Lahore | 1996 |
| 4/56 | 8.0 | Manjula Guruge | v Pakistan | Napier | 2015 |
| 3/45 | 7.0 | Azhar Saeed | v New Zealand | Faisalabad | 1996 |
| 3/60 | 10.0 | Amjad Javed | v Ireland | Brisbane | 2015 |
| 3/63 | 9.3 | Mohammad Naveed | v South Africa | Wellington | 2015 |
Last updated: 15 March 2015
