= 2016 Asia Cup =

Cricket tournament in Bangladesh

2016 Micromax Asia Cup T20
- Dates: 24 February – 6 March 2016
- Administrator: Asian Cricket Council
- Cricket format: Twenty20 International
- Tournament format: Round-robin
- Host: Bangladesh
- Champions: India (6th title)
- Runners-up: Bangladesh
- Participants: 5
- Matches: 11
- Player of the series: (Bangladesh) Sabbir Rahman
- Most runs: (Bangladesh) Sabbir Rahman (176)
- Most wickets: (Bangladesh) Al-Amin Hossain (11)

The 2016 Asia Cup (also called the Micromax Asia Cup T20) was a Twenty20 International (T20I) cricket tournament that was held in Bangladesh from 24 February to 6 March 2016. It was the 13th edition of the Asia Cup, the fifth to be held in Bangladesh, and the first to be played using the T20I format. Bangladesh hosted the tournament for the third consecutive time after 2012 and 2014. Micromax was the main sponsor of the tournament after 2012.

Along with Bangladesh (the host) and Sri Lanka (the defending champions from the 2014 event), the tournament included India, Pakistan, and ICC associate member the United Arab Emirates, who qualified through a qualifier tournament also played in Bangladesh, from 19 to 22 February 2016.

India beat Bangladesh by 8 wickets in the final to win their sixth Asia Cup title and were unbeaten throughout the tournament.

== Teams ==
- Bangladesh
- India
- Pakistan
- Sri Lanka
- United Arab Emirates (Qualifier)

== Squads ==
Bangladesh	India	Pakistan	Sri Lanka	United Arab Emirates
Mashrafe Mortaza (c); Shakib Al Hasan; Imrul Kayes; Mohammad Mithun Ali; Mahmudullah; Mushfiqur Rahim (wk); Soumya Sarkar; Sabbir Rahman; Nasir Hossain; ~~Mustafizur Rahman~~; Al-Amin Hossain; Taskin Ahmed; Arafat Sunny; Abu Hider; Nurul Hasan; Tamim Iqbal	MS Dhoni (c & wk); Virat Kohli (vc); Rohit Sharma; Shikhar Dhawan; Ajinkya Rahane; Suresh Raina; Yuvraj Singh; Hardik Pandya; Ravindra Jadeja; Ravichandran Ashwin; Jasprit Bumrah; Ashish Nehra; Harbhajan Singh; Pawan Negi; Bhuvneshwar Kumar; Parthiv Patel (wk); Mohammed Shami	Shahid Afridi (c); Iftikhar Ahmed; Sarfaraz Ahmed (wk); Umar Akmal; Anwar Ali; Mohammad Amir; Babar Azam; Mohammad Hafeez; Mohammad Irfan; Shoaib Malik; Khurram Manzoor; Mohammad Nawaz; Rumman Raees; Wahab Riaz; Imad Wasim; Sharjeel Khan; Mohammad Sami	Lasith Malinga (c); Dushmantha Chameera; Dinesh Chandimal (wk); Tillakaratne Dilshan; Niroshan Dickwella; Rangana Herath; Shehan Jayasuriya; Chamara Kapugedera; Nuwan Kulasekara; Angelo Mathews; Thisara Perera; Sachithra Senanayake; Dasun Shanaka; Milinda Siriwardana; Jeffrey Vandersay	Amjad Javed (c); Swapnil Patil (wk); Ahmed Raza; Fahad Tariq; Farhan Ahmed; Mohammad Naveed; Mohammad Shahzad; Muhammad Usman; Muhammad Kaleem; Qadeer Ahmed; Rohan Mustafa; Saqlain Haider; Shaiman Anwar; Usman Mushtaq; Zaheer Maqsood

Bhuvneshwar Kumar was added to India's squad as a replacement for Mohammed Shami after Shami failed to fully recover from a hamstring injury. Parthiv Patel was added to India's squad as a back-up for MS Dhoni, who suffered a muscle spasm. Mohammad Sami and Sharjeel Khan were added to Pakistan's squad after injuries to Babar Azam and Rumman Raees and following their performances in 2016 Pakistan Super League. Bangladesh's Mustafizur Rahman was injured during their match against Sri Lanka and was replaced for the rest of the tournament by Tamim Iqbal.

Lasith Malinga was named as Sri Lanka's captain for the tournament, but he only played in their first match. Angelo Mathews captained the side in their second and third matches while Dinesh Chandimal stood as captain in their final match.

== Background ==
After the Asian Cricket Council was downsized by the International Cricket Council (ICC) in April 2015, it was announced that upcoming Asia Cup events will be played on rotation basis in One Day International (ODI) and Twenty20 International (T20I) format based on respective next world events under the ICC. This means that the 2016 and 2020 events will be played using the T20I format, ahead of the 2016 and 2020 World Twenty20s, and the 2018 and 2022 events will be played in ODI format, ahead of the 2019 and 2023 World Cups respectively.

== Venue ==
All eleven matches of the tournament were played at the Sher-e-Bangla National Cricket Stadium in Mirpur, Dhaka.

Mirpur, Dhaka
Sher-e-Bangla National Cricket Stadium
Coordinates: 23°48′24.9″N 90°21′48.9″E
Capacity: 25,416
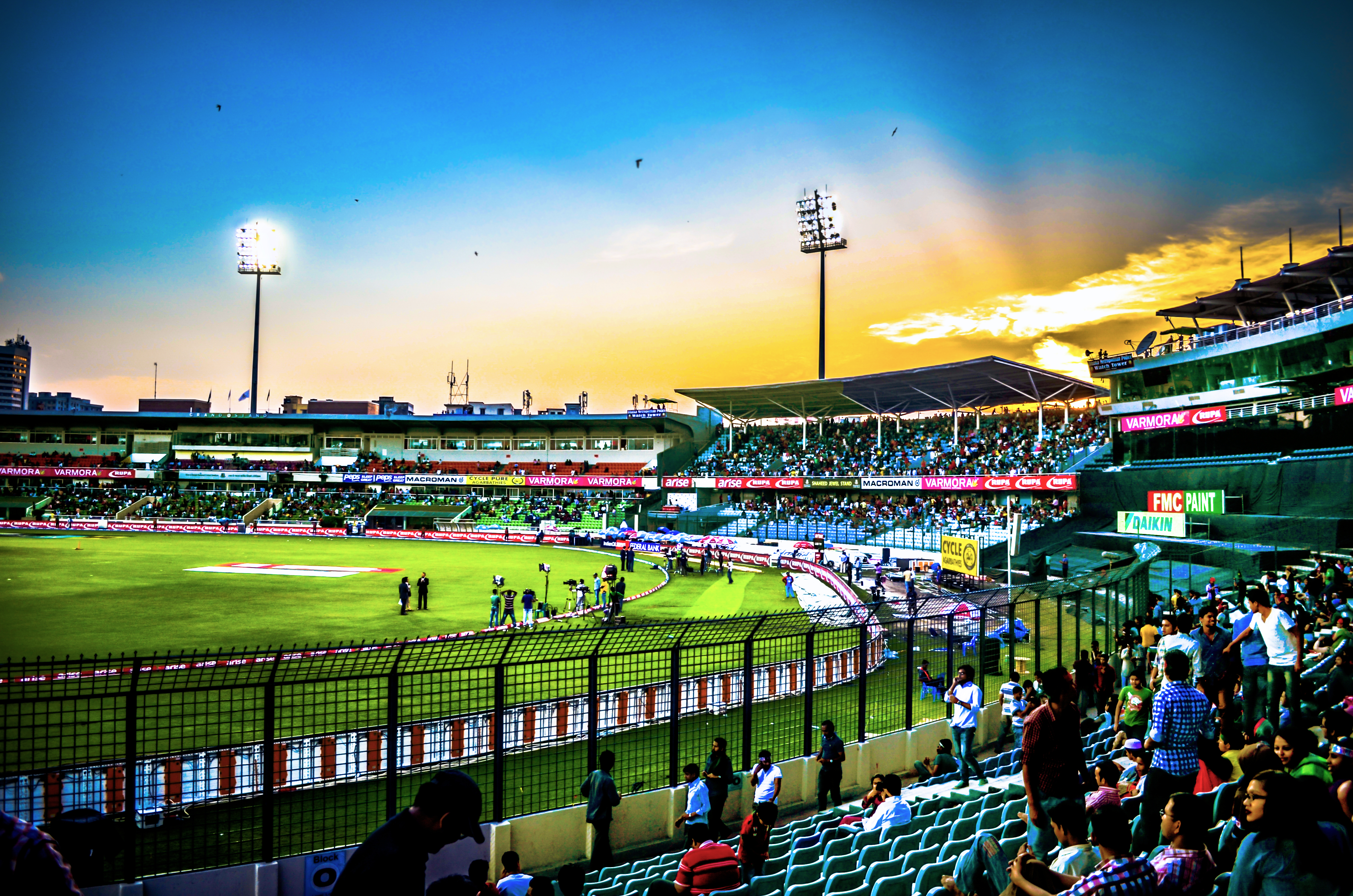

== Group stage ==
=== Standings ===
Pos	Team	Pld	W	L	T	NR	Pts	NRR
1	India	4	4	0	0	0	16	2.020
2	Bangladesh	4	3	1	0	0	12	0.458
3	Pakistan	4	2	2	0	0	8	−0.296
4	Sri Lanka	4	1	3	0	0	4	−0.293
5	United Arab Emirates	4	0	4	0	0	0	−1.813

Advance to Final

=== Matches ===
24 February
19:30 (D/N)
Scorecard

India; 166/6 (20 overs)	v	Bangladesh; 121/7 (20 overs)
Rohit Sharma 83 (55); Al-Amin Hossain 3/37 (4 overs)		Sabbir Rahman 44 (32); Ashish Nehra 3/23 (4 overs)

India won by 45 runs
Sher-e-Bangla National Cricket Stadium, Mirpur
Umpires: Ruchira Palliyaguruge (SL) and Shozab Raza (Pak)
Player of the match: Rohit Sharma (Ind)

- Bangladesh won the toss and elected to field.

25 February
19:30 (D/N)
Scorecard

Sri Lanka; 129/8 (20 overs)	v	United Arab Emirates; 115/9 (20 overs)
Dinesh Chandimal 50 (39); Amjad Javed 3/25 (4 overs)		Swapnil Patil 37 (36); Lasith Malinga 4/26 (4 overs)

Sri Lanka won by 14 runs
Sher-e-Bangla National Cricket Stadium, Mirpur
Umpires: Anil Chaudhary (Ind) and Sharfuddoula (Ban)
Player of the match: Lasith Malinga (SL)

- United Arab Emirates won the toss and elected to field.
- Sri Lanka's score of 129 is their lowest total against an Associate nation in T20Is.

26 February
19:30 (D/N)
Scorecard

Bangladesh; 133/8 (20 overs)	v	United Arab Emirates; 82 (17.4 overs)
Mithun Ali 47 (41); Mohammad Naveed 2/12 (4 overs)		Muhammad Usman 30 (30); Mahmudullah 2/5 (2 overs)

Bangladesh won by 51 runs
Sher-e-Bangla National Cricket Stadium, Mirpur
Umpires: Anil Chaudhary (Ind) and Ruchira Palliyaguruge (SL)
Player of the match: Mahmudullah (Ban)

- United Arab Emirates won the toss and elected to field.
- This was the first time Bangladesh have dismissed a side in the second innings of a T20I.

27 February
19:30 (D/N)
Scorecard

Pakistan; 83 (17.3 overs)	v	India; 85/5 (15.3 overs)
Sarfaraz Ahmed 25 (24); Hardik Pandya 3/8 (3.3 overs)		Virat Kohli 49 (51); Mohammad Amir 3/18 (4 overs)

India won by 5 wickets
Sher-e-Bangla National Cricket Stadium, Mirpur
Umpires: Ruchira Palliyaguruge (SL) and Sharfuddoula (Ban)
Player of the match: Virat Kohli (Ind)

- India won the toss and elected to field.
- Khurram Manzoor (Pak) made his T20I debut.
- Pakistan's score of 83 is their lowest total when batting first in a T20I match.

28 February
19:30 (D/N)
Scorecard

Bangladesh; 147/7 (20 overs)	v	Sri Lanka; 124/8 (20 overs)
Sabbir Rahman 80 (54); Dushmantha Chameera 3/30 (4 overs)		Dinesh Chandimal 37 (37); Al-Amin Hossain 3/34 (4 overs)

Bangladesh won by 23 runs
Sher-e-Bangla National Cricket Stadium, Mirpur
Umpires: Anil Chaudhary (Ind) and Shozab Raza (Pak)
Player of the match: Sabbir Rahman (Ban)

- Bangladesh won the toss and elected to bat.
- This was Bangladesh's first win against Sri Lanka in T20Is.

29 February
19:30 (D/N)
Scorecard

United Arab Emirates; 129/6 (20 overs)	v	Pakistan; 131/3 (18.4 overs)
Shaiman Anwar 46 (42); Mohammad Amir 2/6 (4 overs)		Shoaib Malik 63* (49); Amjad Javed 3/36 (4 overs)

Pakistan won by 7 wickets
Sher-e-Bangla National Cricket Stadium, Mirpur
Umpires: Enamul Haque (Ban) and Ruchira Palliyaguruge (SL)
Player of the match: Shoaib Malik (Pak)

- United Arab Emirates won the toss and elected to bat.
- Mohammad Nawaz (Pak) made his T20I debut.
- Pakistan became the first team to play 100 T20I matches.
- United Arab Emirates were eliminated as a result of this match.

1 March
19:30 (D/N)
Scorecard

Sri Lanka; 138/9 (20 overs)	v	India; 142/5 (19.2 overs)
Chamara Kapugedera 30 (32); Hardik Pandya 2/26 (4 overs); Ravichandran Ashwin 2/26 (4 overs)		Virat Kohli 56* (47); Nuwan Kulasekara 2/21 (3 overs)

India won by 5 wickets
Sher-e-Bangla National Cricket Stadium, Mirpur
Umpires: Anisur Rahman (Ban) and Shozab Raza (Pak)
Player of the match: Virat Kohli (Ind)

- India won the toss and elected to field.
- India qualified for the final as a result of this match.
- MS Dhoni (Ind) became the first player to hit 200 sixes as a captain in international matches.

2 March
19:30 (D/N)
Scorecard

Pakistan; 129/7 (20 overs)	v	Bangladesh; 131/5 (19.1 overs)
Sarfaraz Ahmed 58* (42); Al-Amin Hossain 3/25 (4 overs)		Soumya Sarkar 48 (48); Mohammad Amir 2/26 (4 overs)

Bangladesh won by 5 wickets
Sher-e-Bangla National Cricket Stadium, Mirpur
Umpires: Anil Chaudhary (Ind) and Ruchira Palliyaguruge (SL)
Player of the match: Soumya Sarkar (Ban)

- Pakistan won the toss and elected to bat.
- Bangladesh qualified for the final and Pakistan and Sri Lanka were eliminated as a result of this match.

3 March
19:30 (D/N)
Scorecard

United Arab Emirates; 81/9 (20 overs)	v	India; 82/1 (10.1 overs)
Shaiman Anwar 43 (48); Bhuvneshwar Kumar 2/8 (4 overs)		Rohit Sharma 39 (28); Qadeer Ahmed 1/23 (2 overs)

India won by 9 wickets
Sher-e-Bangla National Cricket Stadium, Mirpur
Umpires: Sharfuddoula (Ban) and Shozab Raza (Pak)
Player of the match: Rohit Sharma (Ind)

- United Arab Emirates won the toss and elected to bat.
- Pawan Negi (Ind) made his T20I debut.
- This is India's biggest win in terms of balls remaining (59) in T20Is.

4 March
19:30 (D/N)
Scorecard

Sri Lanka; 150/4 (20 overs)	v	Pakistan; 151/4 (19.2 overs)
Tillakaratne Dilshan 75* (56); Mohammad Irfan 2/18 (4 overs)		Umar Akmal 48 (37); Tillakaratne Dilshan 1/2 (1 over)

Pakistan won by 6 wickets
Sher-e-Bangla National Cricket Stadium, Mirpur
Umpires: Anil Chaudhary (Ind) and Enamul Haque (Ban)
Player of the match: Umar Akmal (Pak)

- Pakistan won the toss and elected to field.
- Iftikhar Ahmed (Pak) made his T20I debut.
- Tillakaratne Dilshan (SL) became the first player to score 200 fours in T20Is.

== Final ==
6 March
19:30 (D/N)
Scorecard

Bangladesh; 120/5 (15 overs)	v	India; 122/2 (13.5 overs)
Mahmudullah 33* (13); Jasprit Bumrah 1/13 (3 overs)		Shikhar Dhawan 60 (44); Taskin Ahmed 1/14 (3 overs)

India won by 8 wickets
Sher-e-Bangla National Cricket Stadium, Mirpur
Umpires: Ruchira Palliyaguruge (SL) and Shozab Raza (Pak)
Player of the match: Shikhar Dhawan (Ind)

- India won the toss and elected to field.
- The match was reduced to 15 overs per side due to rain.

== Statistics ==
=== Most runs ===
Player	Innings	Runs	NO	Ave.	SR	HS	100	50	4s	6s
(Bangladesh) Sabbir Rahman	5	176	1	44.00	123.94	80	0	1	15	5
(India) Virat Kohli	4	153	2	76.50	110.86	56*	0	1	20	0
(Sri Lanka) Dinesh Chandimal	4	149	0	37.25	109.55	58	0	2	19	2
(India) Rohit Sharma	5	138	0	27.60	132.69	83	0	1	17	4
(Sri Lanka) Tillakaratne Dilshan	4	132	1	44.00	121.10	75*	0	1	18	4
Updated: 12 September 2022

=== Most wickets ===
Player	Innings	Wickets	Overs	Runs	Econ.	Ave.	BBI
(Bangladesh) Al-Amin Hossain	5	11	16.5	134	7.96	12.80	3/25
(Pakistan) Mohammad Amir	4	7	16.0	81	5.06	11.57	3/18
(Sri Lanka) Nuwan Kulasekara	4	7	15.0	95	6.33	13.57	3/10
(India) Hardik Pandya	5	7	17.30	103	5.88	14.71	3/8
(India) Jasprit Bumrah	5	6	18.0	94	5.22	15.66	2/27
Updated: 12 September 2022
