= Scottish cricket team in the United Arab Emirates in 2015–16 =

| | United Arab Emirates | Scotland |
- Date: 4 February 2016
| Captains | Ahmed Raza | Preston Mommsen |

Twenty20 International series
- Results: United Arab Emirates won the 1-match series 1–0

The Scottish cricket team toured the United Arab Emirates to play the United Arab Emirates in February 2016. The tour consisted of a Twenty20 International (T20I) match. The match was in preparation for the World Twenty20 in India in March and was played at the ICC Academy in Dubai. The United Arab Emirates won the one-off match by 9 runs.

== Squads ==
| United Arab Emirates | Scotland |
|---|---|
| Ahmed Raza (c); Amjad Javed; Fahad Tariq; Farhan Ahmed; Muhammad Kaleem; Mohammad Naveed; Mohammad Shahzad; Muhammad Usman; Swapnil Patil; Qadeer Ahmed; Rohan Mustafa; Saqlain Haider; Shaiman Anwar; Laxman Sreekumar; Usman Mushtaq; Zaheer Maqsood | Preston Mommsen (c); Richie Berrington; Kyle Coetzer; Matthew Cross (wk); Josh Davey; Alasdair Evans; Con de Lange; Michael Leask; Matt Machan; Calum MacLeod; George Munsey; Safyaan Sharif; Robert Taylor; Bradley Wheal; Mark Watt |

== T20I series ==
=== Only T20I ===
4 February 2016
Scorecard

| United Arab Emirates; 148/8 (20 overs) | v | Scotland; 139/9 (20 overs) |
| Amjad Javed 76 (42); Safyaan Sharif 4/24 (4 overs) | | Preston Mommsen 56 (42); Mohammad Naveed 2/16 (4 overs) |

United Arab Emirates won by 9 runs
ICC Academy, Dubai
Umpires: C. K. Nandan (Ind) and Sarika Prasad (Sin)
Player of the match: Amjad Javed (UAE)

- United Arab Emirates won the toss and elected to bat.
- Saqlain Haider (UAE) made his T20I debut.

== See also ==
- Scottish cricket team against the Netherlands in the UAE in 2015–16
