= 2016 Asia Cup Qualifier =

Cricket tournament

- Dates: 19 – 22 February 2016
- Administrator: Asian Cricket Council
- Cricket format: Twenty20 International
- Tournament format: Round-robin
- Host: Bangladesh
- Champions: United Arab Emirates
- Participants: 4
- Matches: 6
- Most runs: (Hong Kong) Babar Hayat (194)
- Most wickets: (United Arab Emirates) Mohammad Naveed (7)

The 2016 Asia Cup Qualifier was a Twenty20 International (T20I) cricket tournament held in Bangladesh from 19 to 22 February 2016. The event served as a qualifier for the 2016 Asia Cup, which was held in the same country from 24 February to 6 March 2016. The tournament was played as a round-robin, with the participants being the four Asian associate members of the International Cricket Council (ICC) with T20I status. The United Arab Emirates won all three of its matches, joining Bangladesh, India, Pakistan, and Sri Lanka in the main event.

== Background and teams ==
The Asia Cup Qualifier was originally scheduled to be held in the United Arab Emirates in November 2015. However, following a scheduling conflict, it was later decided to move the event, with it now serving as a lead-in to the main tournament. In previous years where associates have participated in the Asia Cup, no standalone qualifier has been held, with teams instead qualifying via the ACC Trophy (2004, 2008) or by invitation (2014). Of the four teams, Oman made their Asia Cup debut.

Teams

- Afghanistan
- Hong Kong
- Oman
- United Arab Emirates

== Squads ==
Afghanistan	Hong Kong	Oman	United Arab Emirates
Asghar Stanikzai (c); Noor Ali Zadran; Mohammad Shahzad; Usman Ghani; Mohammad Nabi; Karim Sadiq; Shafiqullah; Rashid Khan; Amir Hamza; Dawlat Zadran; Shapoor Zadran; Gulbadin Naib; Samiullah Shinwari; Najibullah Zadran; Yamin Ahmadzai	Tanwir Afzal (c); Mark Chapman (vc); Haseeb Amjad; Nadeem Ahmed; Tanveer Ahmed; Waqas Barkat; Christopher Carter; Babar Hayat; Nizakat Khan; Aizaz Khan; Waqas Khan; Adil Mehmood; Kinchit Shah; Ninad Shah; Anshuman Rath	Sultan Ahmed (c); Aamir Kaleem; Aaqib Sulehri; Adnan Ilyas; Amir Ali; Munis Ansari; Bilal Khan; Jatinder Singh; Ajay Lalcheta; Mehran Khan; Rajeshkumar Ranpura; Sufyan Mehmood; Vaibhav Wategaonkar; Zeeshan Maqsood; Zeeshan Siddiqui	Amjad Javed (c); Swapnil Patil; Ahmed Raza; Fahad Tariq; Farhan Ahmed; Mohammad Naveed; Mohammad Shahzad; Muhammad Usman; Muhammad Kaleem; Qadeer Ahmed; Rohan Mustafa; Saqlain Haider; Shaiman Anwar; Usman Mushtaq; Zaheer Maqsood

== Venues ==
Fatullah	Dhaka
Khan Shaheb Osman Ali Stadium	Sher-e-Bangla National Cricket Stadium
Coordinates: 23°39′0.58″N 90°29′19.72″E	Coordinates: 23°48′24.9″N 90°21′48.9″E
Capacity: 18,000	Capacity: 26,000

== Points table ==
Pos	Team	Pld	W	L	T	NR	Pts	NRR
1	United Arab Emirates	3	3	0	0	0	6	+1.678
2	Afghanistan	3	2	1	0	0	4	+0.954
3	Oman	3	1	2	0	0	2	–1.222
4	Hong Kong	3	0	3	0	0	0	–1.416

Advance to 2016 Asia Cup

== Matches ==
19 February 2016
15:00
Scorecard

United Arab Emirates; 176/4 (20 overs)	v	Afghanistan; 160 (19.5 overs)
Rohan Mustafa 77 (50); Rashid Khan 3/25 (4 overs)		Karim Sadiq 72 (48); Rohan Mustafa 3/19 (2.5 overs)

United Arab Emirates won by 16 runs
Khan Shaheb Osman Ali Stadium, Fatullah
Umpires: Sarika Prasad (Sin) and Sharfuddoula (Ban)

- United Arab Emirates won the toss and elected to bat.
- The United Arab Emirates registered their first victory in the Asia Cup.
- Rohan Mustafa's 77 is the highest score for a UAE player in T20I matches.
- The United Arab Emirates scored their highest total in T20I matches.

19 February 2016
19:30 (D/N)
Scorecard

Oman; 180/5 (20 overs)	v	Hong Kong; 175/7 (20 overs)
Jatinder Singh 42 (35); Nadeem Ahmed 3/27 (4 overs)		Babar Hayat 122 (60); Aamer Ali 1/6 (1 overs)

Oman won by 5 runs
Khan Shaheb Osman Ali Stadium, Fatullah
Umpires: Enamul Haque (Ban) and Buddhi Pradhan (Nep)

- Oman won the toss and elected to bat.
- Oman made their debut in the Asia Cup and registered their first victory in the tournament.
- Vaibhav Wategaonkar (Oman) made his T20I debut.
- Both Oman and Hong Kong posted their highest totals in T20I matches.
- Babar Hayat became the first Hong Kong player to score a century in a T20I match and he scored the first century in an Asia Cup qualifier T20I match.
- Mark Chapman (HK) was dismissed by Mankading.

20 February 2016
15.00
Scorecard

Oman; 165/4 (20 overs)	v	Afghanistan; 168/7 (19.3 overs)
Adnan Ilyas 54 (27); Gulbadin Naib 2/24 (4 overs)		Noor Ali Zadran 63 (44); Mehran Khan 3/18 (4 overs)

Afghanistan won by 3 wickets
Khan Shaheb Osman Ali Stadium, Fatullah
Umpires: Anisur Rahman (Ban) and Sarika Prasad (Sin)

- Oman won the toss and elected to bat.
- Zeeshan Maqsood became the first player for Oman to score more than 50 runs in a T20I innings.

21 February 2016
15:00
Scorecard

Hong Kong; 146/7 (20 overs)	v	United Arab Emirates; 147/4 (18.3 overs)
Babar Hayat 54 (45); Mohammad Naveed 3/14 (4 overs)		Mohammad Shahzad 52 (39); Nadeem Ahmed 1/17 (4 overs)

United Arab Emirates won by 6 wickets
Khan Shaheb Osman Ali Stadium, Fatullah
Umpires: Buddhi Pradhan (Nep) and Sharfuddoula (Ban)

- Hong Kong won the toss and elected to bat.
- Hong Kong were eliminated as a result of this match.

22 February 2016
15:00
Scorecard

Afghanistan; 178/7 (20 overs)	v	Hong Kong; 112 (17.1 overs)
Najibullah Zadran 60* (35); Aizaz Khan 3/38 (4 overs)		Anshuman Rath 41 (38); Mohammad Nabi 4/17 (4 overs)

Afghanistan won by 66 runs
Sher-e-Bangla National Cricket Stadium, Dhaka
Umpires: Enamul Haque (Ban) and Buddhi Pradhan (Nep)
Player of the match: Mohammad Nabi (Afghanistan)

- Hong Kong won the toss and elected to field.
- Adil Mehmood and Tanveer Ahmed (HK) both made their T20I debuts.

22 February 2016
19:30 (D/N)
Scorecard

United Arab Emirates; 172/6 (20 overs)	v	Oman; 101/8 (20 overs)
Muhammad Kaleem 50 (40); Aamir Kaleem 4/31 (3.4 overs)		Zeeshan Maqsood 46 (42); Mohammad Naveed 2/14 (4 overs)

United Arab Emirates won by 71 runs
Sher-e-Bangla National Cricket Stadium, Dhaka
Umpires: Sarika Prasad (Sin) and Sharfuddoula (Ban)
Player of the match: Muhammad Usman (United Arab Emirates)

- Oman won the toss and elected to field.
- Oman and Afghanistan were eliminated as a result of this match, while United Arab Emirates qualified for the 2016 Asia Cup.
