= Irish cricket team in the United Arab Emirates in 2015–16 =

International cricket tour

Irish cricket team against the United Arab Emirates in 2015–16
	United Arab Emirates	Ireland
- Dates: 13 February – 16 February 2016
Captains	Amjad Javed	William Porterfield

Twenty20 International series
- Results: 2-match series drawn 1–1
Most runs	Swapnil Patil (45)	William Porterfield (80)
Most wickets	Amjad Javed (4)	Boyd Rankin (5)

The Irish cricket team toured the United Arab Emirates to play the United Arab Emirates in February 2016. The tour consisted of two Twenty20 International (T20Is) matches and a 20-over tour match. The matches were in preparation for the 2016 ICC World Twenty20. The two-match series was drawn, with Ireland winning the first match and the United Arab Emirates winning the second. The second match of the series was the 500th T20I match since the format was introduced in 2005.

== Squads ==
United Arab Emirates	Ireland
Amjad Javed (c); Ahmed Raza; Fahad Tariq; Farhan Ahmed; Hafiz Qaleem; Mohammad Naveed; Mohammad Shahzad; Muhammad Usman; Swapnil Patil; Qadeer Ahmed; Rohan Mustafa; Saqlain Haider; Shaiman Anwar; Laxman Sreekumar; Usman Mushtaq; Zaheer Maqsood	William Porterfield (c); Andrew Balbirnie; George Dockrell; Tim Murtagh; Andrew McBrine; Kevin O'Brien; Niall O'Brien; Andrew Poynter; Stuart Poynter; Boyd Rankin; Max Sorensen; Paul Stirling; Stuart Thompson; Gary Wilson; Craig Young

== Tour match ==
Afghanistan defeated Ireland by 10 wickets.

=== 20-over match: Ireland vs Afghanistan ===
13 February 2016
10:00

Ireland; 136 (19.3 overs)	v	Afghanistan; 139/0 (12.2 overs)

Afghanistan won by 10 wickets
Sheikh Zayed Cricket Stadium, Abu Dhabi

== T20I series ==
=== 1st T20I ===
14 February 2016
13:30
Scorecard

Ireland; 134/8 (20 overs)	v	United Arab Emirates; 100 (19.2 overs)
Niall O'Brien 38 (29); Amjad Javed 3/41 (4 overs)		Shaiman Anwar 24 (28); Kevin O'Brien 3/14 (4 overs)

Ireland won by 34 runs
Sheikh Zayed Cricket Stadium, Abu Dhabi
Umpires: Iftikhar Ali (UAE) and Rabiul Hoque (UAE)

- United Arab Emirates won the toss and elected to field.

=== 2nd T20I ===
16 February 2016
10:30
Scorecard

United Arab Emirates; 133/7 (20 overs)	v	Ireland; 128/9 (20 overs)
Swapnil Patil 31 (37); Boyd Rankin 3/17 (4 overs)		William Porterfield 72 (60); Mohammad Shahzad 2/10 (2 overs)

United Arab Emirates won by 5 runs
Sheikh Zayed Cricket Stadium, Abu Dhabi
Umpires: Akbar Ali (UAE) and Iftikhar Ali (UAE)

- United Arab Emirates won the toss and elected to bat.
- Usman Mushtaq (UAE) made his T20I debut.
