= Omani cricket team in the United Arab Emirates in 2015–16 =

International cricket tour

Omani cricket team against the United Arab Emirates in 2015–16
	United Arab Emirates	Oman
- Dates: 7 – 22 November 2015
Captains	Ahmed Raza	Sultan Ahmed

Twenty20 International series
- Results: United Arab Emirates won the 1-match series 1–0
Most runs	Shaiman Anwar (54)	Zeeshan Maqsood (44)
Most wickets	Rohan Mustafa (3)	Rajeshkumar Ranpura (1)

The Oman cricket team toured the United Arab Emirates in November 2015 to play them in a Twenty20 International (T20I) match and a tour match. The matches were in preparation for the 2016 Asia Cup Qualifier. The tour match was drawn, while the UAE won the T20I by seven wickets.

== Squads ==
United Arab Emirates	Oman
Ahmed Raza (c); Abdul Shakoor; Amjad Ali; Asif Iqbal; Mohammad Naveed; Nasir Aziz; Swapnil Patil; Yodhin Punja; Qadeer Ahmed; Qais Farooq; Raja Adeel; Rohan Mustafa; Rohit Singh; Shaiman Anwar; Laxman Sreekumar; Umair Ali; Usman Mushtaq; Zaheer Maqsood; Amjad Khan	Sultan Ahmed (c); Aamir Kaleem; Aaqib Sulehri; Adnan Ilyas; Amir Ali; Munis Ansari; Bilal Khan; Jatinder Singh; Swapnil Khadye; Khawar Ali; Ajay Lalcheta; Mehran Khan; Moonamchery Michal; Mohammad Nadeem; Rajeshkumar Ranpura; Sufyan Mehmood; Vaibhav Wategaonkar; Yousuf Al Balushi; Zeeshan Maqsood; Zeeshan Siddiqui

== Tour match ==
=== Two-day: United Arab Emirates v Oman ===
7 – 8 November 2015
Scorecard

United Arab Emirates	v	Oman
202 (76 overs); Asif Iqbal 41 (86); Khawar Ali 6/43 (13 overs)		163 (57 overs); Jatinder Singh 81* (112); Ahmed Raza 4/64 (25 overs)
95 (39.5 overs); Swapnil Patil 41 (70); Amir Ali 3/13 (2.5 overs)		45/3 (7 overs); Adnan Ilyas 13* (14); Nasir Aziz 2/14 (2 overs)

Match drawn
Ajman Oval, Ajman
Umpires: Ahmed Shah Durrani (Afg) and Buddhi Pradhan (Nep)

- United Arab Emirates won the toss and elected to bat.

== T20I series ==
=== Only T20I ===
22 November 2015
10:00
Scorecard

Oman; 133/8 (20 overs)	v	United Arab Emirates; 134/3 (18.2 overs)
Zeeshan Maqsood 44 (34); Rohan Mustafa 3/9 (4 overs)		Shaiman Anwar 54 (43); Rajeshkumar Ranpura 1/15 (2 overs)

United Arab Emirates won by 7 wickets
Sheikh Zayed Cricket Stadium, Abu Dhabi
Umpires: Vineet Kulkarni (Ind) and Sarika Prasad (Sin)

- United Arab Emirates won the toss and elected to field.
- Amjad Khan, Qadeer Ahmed and Zaheer Maqsood (UAE) all made their T20I debuts.
