= Dutch cricket team in the United Arab Emirates in 2015–16 =

	United Arab Emirates	Netherlands
- Dates: 21 January 2016 – 3 February 2016
Captains	Ahmed Raza	Peter Borren

Twenty20 International series
- Results: Netherlands won the 1-match series 1–0

The Dutch cricket team toured the United Arab Emirates to play the United Arab Emirates between 21 January and 3 February 2016. The tour consisted of a first-class match two List A games and a Twenty20 International (T20I) match. The T20I match was in preparation for the World Twenty20 in India in March and the Netherlands won the one-off game by 84 runs. The first-class match was part of the 2015–17 ICC Intercontinental Cup and the List A games were part of the 2015–17 ICC World Cricket League Championship.

== Squads ==
United Arab Emirates	Netherlands
Ahmed Raza (c); Amjad Javed; Fahad Tariq; Farhan Ahmed; Muhammad Kaleem; Mohammad Naveed; Mohammad Shahzad; Muhammad Usman; Swapnil Patil; Qadeer Ahmed; Rohan Mustafa; Saqlain Haider; Shaiman Anwar; Laxman Sreekumar; Usman Mushtaq; Zaheer Maqsood	Peter Borren (c); Rahil Ahmed; Ahsan Malik; Wesley Barresi; Mudassar Bukhari; Ben Cooper; Quirijn Gunning; Vivian Kingma; Stephan Myburgh; Max O'Dowd; Michael Rippon; Pieter Seelaar; Roelof van der Merwe; Paul van Meekeren; Sikander Zulfiqar

== T20I series ==
=== Only T20I ===
3 February 2016
Scorecard

Netherlands; 157/5 (20 overs)	v	United Arab Emirates; 73 (16.4 overs)
Wesley Barresi 48 (45); Rohan Mustafa 2/19 (3 overs)		Muhammad Usman 49* (44); Mudassar Bukhari 4/7 (4 overs)

Netherlands won by 84 runs
ICC Academy, Dubai
Umpires: C. K. Nandan (Ind) and Sarika Prasad (Sin)
Player of the match: Mudassar Bukhari (Ned)

- United Arab Emirates won the toss and elected to field.
- Sikander Zulfiqar (Ned), Fahad Tariq, Farhan Ahmed, Muhammad Usman and Muhammad Kaleem (UAE) all made their T20I debuts.
- Mudassar Bukhari (Ned) recorded career-best figures in T20s, with four wickets for seven runs.

== See also ==
- Scottish cricket team against the Netherlands in the UAE in 2015–16
