= 2013 ACC Emerging Teams Cup =

Cricket tournament

- Dates: 17 – 25 August 2013
- Administrator: Asian Cricket Council
- Cricket format: List A
- Tournament format(s): Round-robin & knockout
- Host: Singapore
- Champions: India U23 (1st title)
- Runners-up: Pakistan U23
- Participants: 8
- Matches: 15
- Player of the series: (United Arab Emirates) Shaiman Anwar
- Most runs: (India) K. L. Rahul (321)
- Most wickets: (United Arab Emirates) Nasir Aziz (17)

The 2013 ACC Emerging Teams Cup was the first edition of the ACC Emerging Teams Asia Cup was held in Singapore. Eight teams participated in the tournament, comprising four under-23 teams from Test nations and four top associate teams from Asia.

== Teams ==
Group A	Group B
India U-23	Sri Lanka U-23
Pakistan U-23	Bangladesh U-23
Afghanistan	United Arab Emirates
Nepal	Singapore
Source:ACC

== Squads ==
Afghanistan	Bangladesh	India	Nepal
Mohammad Nabi (c); Nawroz Mangal; Asghar Afghan; Rahmat Shah; Samiullah Shinwari; Mohammad Shahzad (wk); Dawlat Zadran; Izatullah Dawlatzai; Mohibullah Oryakhel; Mirwais Ashraf; Gulbadin Naib; Hamza Hotak; Karim Sadiq; Hamid Hassan; Hashmatullah Shahidi	Litton Das (c & wk); Mizanur Rahman; Myshukur Rahaman; Soumya Sarkar; Rumman Ahmed; Mohammad Mithun; Asif Ahmed; Nurul Hasan (wk); Alauddin Babu; Mahmudul Hasan; Noor Hossain; Taijul Islam; Nazmul Islam; Dewan Sabbir; Abu Jayed	Suryakumar Yadav (c); KL Rahul (wk); Kaustubh Pawar; Ankit Bawne; Unmukt Chand; Ashok Menaria; Manprit Juneja; Smit Patel (wk); Prashant Chopra; Jasprit Bumrah; Sandeep Warrier; Harshal Patel; Axar Patel; Sandeep Sharma; Baba Aparajith	Paras Khadka (c); Gyanendra Malla; Sharad Vesawkar; Rahul Vishwakarma; Shakti Gauchan; Basant Regmi; Sagar Pun; Pradeep Airee; Anil Mandal; Prithu Baskota; Binod Bhandari (wk); Chandra Sawad; Subash Khakurel (wk); Avinash Karn; Ramnaresh Giri
Pakistan	Singapore	Sri Lanka	United Arab Emirates
Hammad Azam (c); Azeem Ghumman; Babar Azam; Bilawal Bhatti; Ehsan Adil; Mohammad Nawaz; Mohammad Rizwan (wk); Mohammad Waqas; Nasir Malik; Raza Hasan; Rumman Raees; Umar Siddiq; Umar Waheed; Usman Qadir; Usman Salahuddin	Saad Janjua (c); Chetan Suryawanshi; Andre de Lange; Anish Param; Kshitij Shinde (wk); Lishaan Shekhar; Mohamed Shoib; Prasheen Param; Amjad Mahboob; Chaminda Ruwan; Timothy Singham (wk); Abhiraj Singh; Irfan Madakia; Rezza Gaznavi; Narender Reddy	Kithruwan Vithanage (c); Shehan Jayasuriya; Niroshan Dickwella (wk); Udara Jayasundera; Danushka Gunathilaka; Rumesh Buddika; Kusal Mendis (wk); Akila Dananjaya; Amila Aponso; Maduka Liyanapathiranage; Lahiru Jayaratne; Kasun Madushanka; Lahiru Madushanka; Chathuranga Kumara; Charith Jayampathi	Sneh Patel (c); Saqib Ali; Vikrant Shetty; Shaiman Anwar; Nasir Aziz; Abdul Shakoor (wk); Rohan Mustafa; Muhammad Naveed; Manjula Guruge; Sharif Asadullah; Fayyaz Ahmed; Shadeep Silva; Dan D’Souza; Swapnil Patil (wk); Muhammad Azam; Amjad Khan

== Point table ==
Group-A

Team	Pld	W	L	T	NR	NRR	Pts
India U23	3	2	1	0	0	+0.440	4
Pakistan U23	3	2	1	0	0	+0.425	4
Afghanistan	3	2	1	0	0	+0.177	4
Nepal	3	0	3	0	0	−1.140	0

Group-B

Team	Pld	W	L	T	NR	NRR	Pts
Sri Lanka U23	3	3	0	0	0	+0.700	6
United Arab Emirates	3	2	1	0	0	+0.878	4
Bangladesh U23	3	1	2	0	0	−0.233	2
Singapore	3	0	3	0	0	−1.506	0

== League stage ==
=== Group-A ===
17 August 2013
09:30
Scorecard

Afghanistan; 169/9 (50 overs)	v	Nepal; 157 (45.3 overs)
Samiullah Shinwari 33 (64); Basant Regmi 5/31 (10 overs)		Paras Khadka 60 (62); Hamid Hassan 2/22 (10 overs)

Afghanistan won by 3 runs (DLS method)
Singapore Cricket Club, Padang
Umpires: Mosur Ramesh (Sin) and Kandhaday Srinivasan (Sin)
Player of the match: Paras Khadka (Nep)

- Nepal won the toss and elected to field.
- Due to rain second innings was reduced to 46 overs and revised target was 161 runs.

18 August 2013
09:30
Scorecard

Pakistan U23; 191/7 (50 overs)	v	India U23; 192/7 (47.5 overs)
Usman Salahuddin 61 (105); Sandeep Warrier 3/32 (9 overs)		Unmukt Chand 61 (103); Raza Hasan 3/39 (8.5 overs)

India U-23 won by 3 wickets
Kallang Ground, Singapore
Umpires: Buddhi Pradhan (Nep) and Sarika Prasad (Sin)
Player of the match: Sandeep Warrier (Ind U23)

- India Under-23 won the toss and elected to field.
- Jasprit Bumrah (Ind) made his List A debut.

19 August 2013
09:30
Scorecard

Afghanistan; 142 (49.3 overs)	v	Pakistan U23; 143/8 (48.4 overs)
Hashmatullah Shahidi 52* (128); Raza Hasan 3/27 (9.3 overs)		Umar Waheed 43 (80); Hamid Hassan 2/21 (10 overs); Mohammad Nabi 2/21 (10 overs)

Pakistan U-23 won by 2 wickets
Kallang Ground, Singapore
Umpires: Mosur Ramesh (Sin) and Sarika Prasad (Sin)
Player of the match: Umar Waheed (Pak U23)

- Pakistan Under-23 won the toss and elected to field.
- Hashmatullah Shahidi (Afg) made his List A debut.

20 August 2013
09:30
Scorecard

India U23; 268/5 (50 overs)	v	Nepal; 184/8 (50 overs)
K. L. Rahul 88 (123); Basant Regmi 3/90 (10 overs)		Sagar Pun 52* (61); Ankit Bawne 3/36 (9 overs)

India U-23 won by 84 runs
Singapore Cricket Club, Padang
Umpires: Kandhaday Srinivasan (Sin) and Sarika Prasad (Sin)
Player of the match: Suryakumar Yadav (Ind U23)

- Nepal won the toss and elected to field.

21 August 2013
09:30
Scorecard

Nepal; 156 (50 overs)	v	Pakistan U23; 159/1 (33.1 overs)
Subash Khakurel 78 (128); Raza Hasan 3/21 (10 overs)		Babar Azam 100* (118); Basant Regmi 1/34 (9 overs)

Pakistan U-23 won by 9 wickets
Singapore Cricket Club, Padang
Umpires: Chandrasekaran Madhavan (Sin) and Kandhaday Srinivasan (Sin)
Player of the match: Babar Azam (Pak U23)

- Pakistan Under-23 won the toss and elected to field.

22 August 2013
09:30
Scorecard

Afghanistan; 184/7 (50 overs)	v	India U23; 156/9 (50 overs)
Samiullah Shinwari 43* (44); Baba Aparajith 2/16 (6 overs)		K. L. Rahul 51 (80); Mohammad Nabi 3/32 (10 overs)

Afghanistan won by 28 runs
Kallang Ground, Singapore
Umpires: Mosur Ramesh (Sin) and Chandrasekaran Madhavan (Sin)
Player of the match: Samiullah Shinwari (Afg)

- India Under-23 won the toss and elected to field.

=== Group-B ===
17 August 2013
09:30
Scorecard

Singapore; 121 (47.1 overs)	v	Bangladesh U23; 122/2 (26.4 overs)
Anish Paraam 37 (89); Noor Hossain 4/25 (10 overs)		Soumya Sarkar 65* (81); Chetan Suryawanshi 1/12 (5 overs)

Bangladesh U-23 won by 8 wickets
Kallang Ground, Singapore
Umpires: Viswanadan Kalidas (Mal) and Buddhi Pradhan (Nep)
Player of the match: Noor Hossain (Ban U23)

- Singapore won the toss and elected to bat.

18 August 2013
09:30
Scorecard

Sri Lanka; 259/6 (50 overs)	v	Bangladesh U23; 197 (47.4 overs)
Shehan Jayasuriya 85 (101); Sabbir Rahman 3/44 (10 overs)		Rony Talukdar 56 (73); Charith Jayampathi 5/20 (8.4 overs)

Sri Lanka U-23 won by 62 runs
Singapore Cricket Club, Padang
Umpires: Anand Natarajan (Sin) and Viswanadan Kalidas (Mal)
Player of the match: Shehan Jayasuriya (SL U23)

- Bangladesh Under-23 won the toss and elected to field.
- Liton Das, Dewan Sabbir and Taijul Islam (Ban) all made their List A debut.

19 August 2013
09:30
Scorecard

Singapore; 162 (48 overs)	v	United Arab Emirates; 164/1 (27.3 overs)
Chetan Suryawanshi 33 (63); Nasir Aziz 4/41 (9 overs)		Shaiman Anwar 119* (104); Saad Janjua 1/9 (2 overs)

United Arab Emirates won by 9 wickets
Singapore Cricket Club, Padang
Umpires: Viswanadan Kalidas (Mal) and Buddhi Pradhan (Nep)
Player of the match: Shaiman Anwar (UAE)

- United Arab Emirates won the toss and elected to field.

20 August 2013
09:30
Scorecard

Sri Lanka; 235/8 (50 overs)	v	United Arab Emirates; 205/9 (50 overs)
Shehan Jayasuriya 101 (121); Nasir Aziz 3/39 (10 overs)		Shaiman Anwar 53 (85); Lahiru Jayaratne 3/36 (9 overs)

Sri Lanka U-23 won by 30 runs
Kallang Ground, Singapore
Umpires: Chandrasekaran Madhavan (Sin) and Anand Natarajan (Sin)
Player of the match: Lahiru Jayaratne (SL U23)

- Sri Lanka Under-23 won the toss and elected to bat.
- Amjad Khan (UAE) made their List A debut.

21 August 2013
09:30
Scorecard

Sri Lanka; 191 (48.5 overs)	v	Singapore; 178/5 (50 overs)
Udara Jayasundera 72 (104); Mohamed Shoib 4/16 (8.5 overs)		Anish Paraam 62* (83); Amila Aponso 1/24 (10 overs)

Sri Lanka U-23 won by 13 runs
Kallang Ground, Singapore
Umpires: Viswanadan Kalidas (Mal) and Buddhi Pradhan (Nep)
Player of the match: Udara Jayasundera (SL U23)

- Sri Lanka Under-23 won the tossand elected to bat.

22 August 2013
09:30
Scorecard

United Arab Emirates; 202/8 (50 overs)	v	Bangladesh U23; 143 (41 overs)
Shaiman Anwar 100 (135); Noor Hossain 3/31 (10 overs)		Myshukur Rahaman 34 (78); Nasir Aziz 5/17 (7 overs)

United Arab Emirates won by 59 runs
Singapore Cricket Club, Padang
Umpires: Anand Natarajan (Sin) and Sarika Prasad (Sin)
Player of the match: Nasir Aziz (UAE)

- Bangladesh Under-23 won the toss and elected to field.

== Knockout stage ==
=== Semifinal 1 ===
23 August 2013
09:30
Scorecard

India U23; 208 (49.5 overs)	v	United Arab Emirates; 162 (48.3 overs)
Manprit Juneja 76 (121); Nasir Aziz 5/51 (9.5 overs)		Shaiman Anwar 44 (80); Axar Patel 4/29 (8.3 overs)

India U-23 won by 46 runs
Kallang Ground, Singapore
Umpires: Mosur Ramesh (Sin) and Sarika Prasad (Sin)
Player of the match: Axar Patel (Ind U23)

- India Under-23 won the toss and elected to bat.

=== Semifinal 2 ===
23 August 2013
09:30
Scorecard

Sri Lanka U23; 230/7 (50 overs)	v	Pakistan U23; 232/9 (48.5 overs)
Udara Jayasundera 94 (120); Usman Qadir 5/32 (10 overs)		Hammad Azam 66* (69); Amila Aponso 3/31 (10 overs)

Pakistan U-23 won by 1 wicket
Singapore Cricket Club, Padang
Umpires: Viswanadan Kalidas (Mal) and Buddhi Pradhan (Nep)
Player of the match: Hammad Azam (Pak U23)

- Sri Lanka Under-23 won the toss and elected to bat.

=== Final ===
25 August 2013
09:30
Scorecard

Pakistan U23; 159 (47 overs)	v	India U23; 160/1 (33.4 overs)
Umar Waheed 41 (64); Baba Aparajith 3/28 (7 overs)		K. L. Rahul 93* (107); Raza Hasan 1/41 (8.4 overs)

India U-23 won by 9 wickets
Kallang Ground, Singapore
Umpires: Buddhi Pradhan (Nep) and Sarika Prasad (Sin)
Player of the match: K. L. Rahul (Ind U23)

- Pakistan Under-23 won the toss and elected to bat.
