= Afghan cricket team in the United Arab Emirates in 2014–15 =

Afghanistan cricket team in UAE 2014
| | United Arab Emirates | Afghanistan |
- Dates: 28 November 2014 – 4 December 2014
| Captains | Khurram Khan | Mohammad Nabi |

One Day International series
- Results: United Arab Emirates won the 4-match series 3–1
| Most runs | Khurram Khan 270 | Nawroz Mangal 239 |
| Most wickets | Krishna Chandran 6 | Hamid Hassan 6 |

The Afghanistan national cricket team toured the United Arab Emirates from 28 November to 4 December 2014. The tour consisted of four One Day International matches between UAE and Afghanistan. The United Arab Emirates won the series 3–1.

That was Afghanistan's "home series", which was held in the UAE due to the safety and security conditions in Afghanistan.

== Squads ==
Squads
| (United Arab Emirates) UAE | Afghanistan |
|---|---|
| Khurram Khan (C); Ahmed Raza; Amjad Ali; Amjad Javed; Andri Berenger; Faizan Asif; Fayyaz Ahmed; Manjula Guruge; Kamran Shazad; Krishna Chandran; Mohammad Naveed; Mohammad Shahzad; Mohammad Tauqir; Nasir Aziz; Swapnil Patil (WK); Rohan Mustafa; Saqib Ali; Saqlain Haider (WK); Shaiman Anwar; Salman Farooq | Mohammad Nabi (C); Nawroz Mangal (VC); Afsar Zazai; Asghar Stanikzai; Dawlat Ahmadzai; Gulbadin Naib; Javed Ahmadi; Mirwais Ashraf; Najibullah Zadran; Nasir Jamal; Samiullah Shenwari; Shafiqullah (WK); Shapoor Zadran; Sharafuddin Ashraf; Usman Ghani; Aftab Alam; Farid Malik; Hamid Hassan; Izatullah Dawlatzai |

== ODI series ==
=== 1st ODI ===
28 November 2014
Scorecard

| Afghanistan; 248/6 (50 overs) | v | (United Arab Emirates) UAE; 249/5 (48.4 overs) |
| Afsar Zazai 60 (109); Krishna Chandran 2/37 (7 overs) | | Amjad Ali 67 (79); Mohammad Nabi 2/41 (10 overs) |

United Arab Emirates won by 5 wickets
ICC Academy, United Arab Emirates
Umpires: Johan Cloete (South Africa) and Richard Kettleborough (England)
Player of the match: Amjad Ali (UAE)

- Afghanistan won the toss and elected to bat.
- Afsar Zazai (Afghanistan) and Andri Berenger (UAE) made their ODI debuts.

=== 2nd ODI ===
30 November 2014
Scorecard

| Afghanistan; 280/8 (50 overs) | v | (United Arab Emirates) UAE; 282/4 (48.2 overs) |
| Nawroz Mangal 129 (123); Krishna Chandran 3/45 (9 overs) | | Khurram Khan 132* (138); Dawlat Zadran 2/45 (10 overs) |

United Arab Emirates won by 6 wickets
ICC Academy, United Arab Emirates
Umpires: Johan Cloete (South Africa) and Richard Kettleborough (England)
Player of the match: Khurram Khan (UAE)

- UAE won the toss and elected to field.
- Salman Farooq (UAE) made his ODI debut.

=== 3rd ODI ===
2 December 2014
Scorecard

| (United Arab Emirates) UAE; 273/5 (50 overs) | v | Afghanistan; 276/8 (49.4 overs) |
| Khurram Khan 85* (80); Dawlat Zadran 2/51 (10 overs) | | Javed Ahmadi 67 (45); Rohan Mustafa 2/33 (10 overs) |

Afghanistan won by 2 wickets
ICC Academy, United Arab Emirates
Umpires: Richard Kettleborough (England) and Sarika Prasad (Singapore)
Player of the match: Mirwais Ashraf (Afghanistan)

- Afghanistan won the toss and elected to field.
- Farid Malik (Afghanistan), Nasir Aziz and Saqlain Haider (both UAE) made their ODI debuts.

=== 4th ODI ===
4 December 2014
Scorecard

| (United Arab Emirates) UAE; 258/9 (50 overs) | v | Afghanistan; 228 (49.3 overs) |
| Andri Berenger 66 (72); Hamid Hassan 5/45 (10 overs) | | Nawroz Mangal 48 (47); Kamran Shazad 3/45 (10 overs) |

United Arab Emirates won by 30 runs
ICC Academy, United Arab Emirates
Umpires: Johan Cloete (South Africa) and Richard Kettleborough (England)

- Afghanistan won the toss and elected to field.
