= 2026 Abu Dhabi Knight Riders season =

Abu Dhabi Knight Riders
2025-26 season
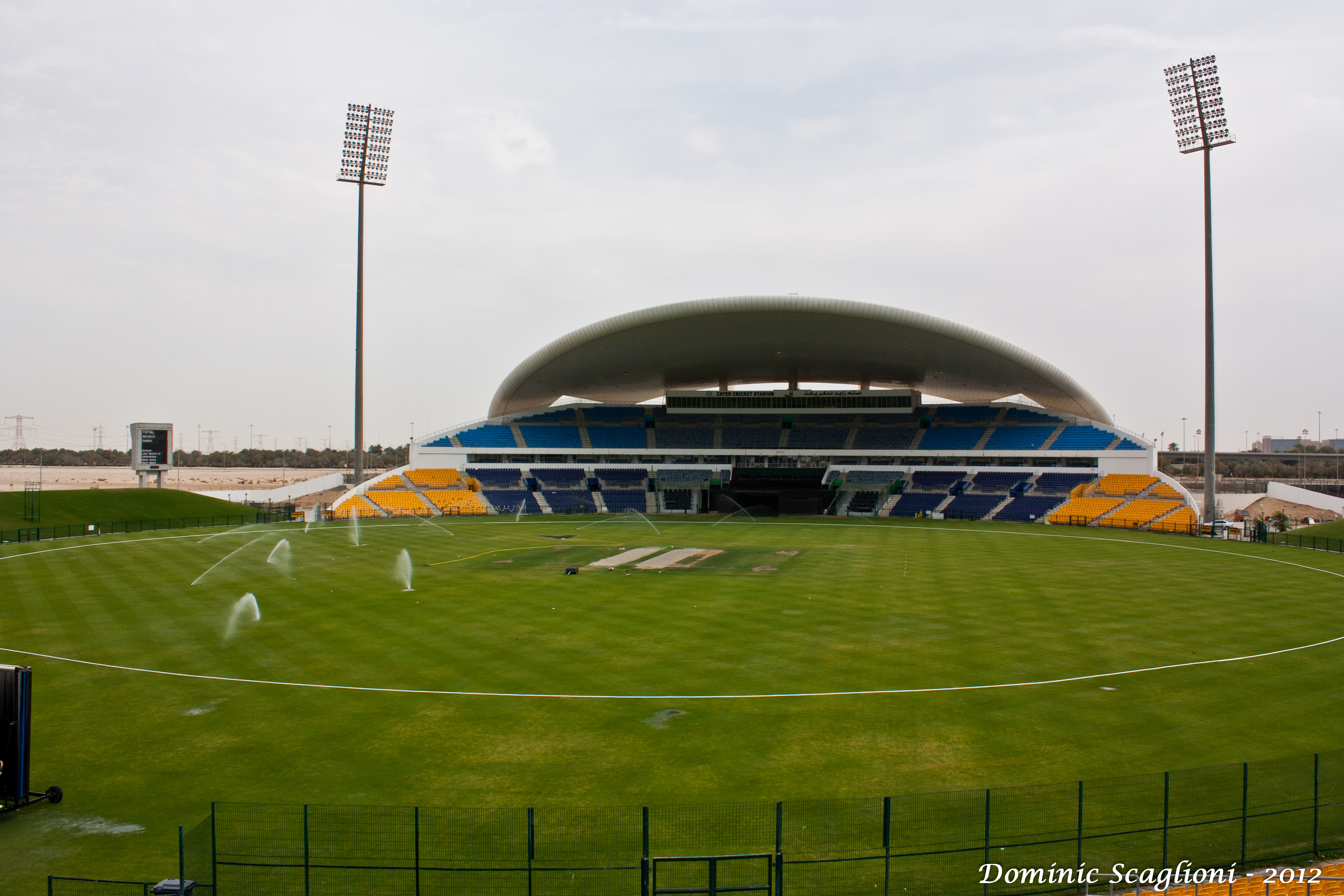
- Zayed Cricket Stadium, home ground of Abu Dhabi Knight Riders
- Coach: Dwayne Bravo
- Captain: Jason Holder
- Ground(s): Sheikh Zayed Cricket Stadium, Abu Dhabi

The 2026 season was the fourth season for the International League T20 franchise Abu Dhabi Knight Riders. They were one of the six teams that competed in the 2025-26 International League T20. The team finished in sixth place in the previous season's league stage.

== Pre-season ==
=== Retentions and signings ===
Abu Dhabi Knight Riders retained five players from last season. The team additionally signed three international players in their squad for the season.

Retained players
Player	Country
Andre Russell	Jamaica
Alishan Sharafu	United Arab Emirates
Charith Asalanka	Sri Lanka
Phil Salt	England
Sunil Narine	Trinidad and Tobago

Signed players
Player	Country
Alex Hales	England
Liam Livingstone	England
Sherfane Rutherford	Guyana

=== Auction summary ===
The auction took place on 1 October 2025. Abu Dhabi spent US$1,457,000 and bought 11 players, including Brandon McMullen, Michael Pepper, and Unmukt Chand.

Players bought
Player	Country	Salary (in US$)	Player	Country	Salary (in US$)
Brandon McMullen	Scotland	110,000	[[]]		10,000
Michael Pepper	England	40,000	[[]]		10,000
Unmukt Chand	United States	40,000	[[]]		10,000
Ibrar Ahmad	United Arab Emirates	22,000	[[]]		10,000
George Garton	England	10,000	[[]]		10,000
Ajay Kumar	United Arab Emirates	10,000	—N/a		

== League Stage ==
=== Points table ===
Pos	Team	Pld	W	L	NR	Pts	NRR	Qualification
1	Desert Vipers (C)	10	8	2	0	16	0.438	Advance to Qualifier 1
2	MI Emirates (R)	10	7	3	0	14	0.676	Advance to Qualifier 1
3	Dubai Capitals (4th)	10	5	5	0	10	0.578	Advance to Eliminator
4	Abu Dhabi Knight Riders (3rd)	10	4	6	0	8	−0.559	Advance to Eliminator
5	Gulf Giants	10	3	7	0	6	−0.310	Eliminated
6	Sharjah Warriorz	10	3	7	0	6	−0.815	Eliminated

Source: ESPNcricinfo
(C) Champions; (R) Runners-up

=== Fixtures ===
Match 2
3 December 2025
18:30 (N)
Scorecard

Abu Dhabi Knight Riders; 233/4 (20 overs)	v	Sharjah Warriorz; 194/9 (20 overs)
Liam Livingstone 82* (38); Adil Rashid 2/31 (4 overs)		Tim David 60 (24); George Garton 2/24 (2 overs)

Abu Dhabi Knight Riders won by 39 runs
Sharjah Cricket Stadium, Sharjah
Umpires: Ahmad Shah Pakteen (Afg) and Martin Saggers (Eng)
Player of the match: Liam Livingstone (Abu Dhabi Knight Riders)

- Sharjah Warriorz won the toss and elected to field.
- Raees Ahmed (Sharjah Warriorz) and Ajay Kumar (Abu Dhabi Knight Riders) made their T20 debuts.

Match 4
5 December 2025
18:30 (N)
Scorecard

Abu Dhabi Knight Riders; 171/6 (20 overs)	v	Desert Vipers; 175/8 (19.3 overs)
Alex Hales 53 (37); Qais Ahmad 2/29 (4 overs)		Shimron Hetmyer 48 (25); Ajay Kumar 3/21 (4 overs)

Desert Vipers won by 2 wickets
Sharjah Cricket Stadium, Sharjah
Umpires: Asif Iqbal (UAE) and Wayne Knights (NZ)
Player of the match: Shimron Hetmyer (Desert Vipers)

- Desert Vipers won the toss and elected to field.

Match 7
7 December 2025
18:30 (N)
Scorecard

Dubai Capitals; 186/4 (20 overs)	v	Abu Dhabi Knight Riders; 103 (15.3 overs)
Rovman Powell 96* (52); Jason Holder 2/30 (4 overs)		Phil Salt 27 (21); Waqar Salamkheil 4/29 (3.3 overs)

Dubai Capitals won by 83 runs
Dubai International Cricket Stadium, Dubai
Umpires: Aasif Iqbal (UAE) and Wayne Knights (NZ)
Player of the match: Rovman Powell (Dubai Capitals)

- Abu Dhabi Knight Riders won the toss and elected to field.

Match 11
11 December 2025
18:30 (N)
Scorecard

Abu Dhabi Knight Riders; 122 (19.3 overs)	v	MI Emirates; 123/3 (13.5 overs)
Alishan Sharafu 38 (34); Fazalhaq Farooqi 4/14 (3.3 overs)		Jonny Bairstow 49* (38); Jason Holder 1/11 (2 overs)

MI Emirates won by 7 wickets
Sheikh Zayed Cricket Stadium, Abu Dhabi
Umpires: Aasif Iqbal (UAE) and Wayne Knights (NZ)
Player of the match: Kamindu Mendis (MI Emirates)

- MI Emirates won the toss and elected to field.

Match 13
13 December 2025
18:30 (N)
Scorecard

Dubai Capitals; 196/5 (20 overs)	v	Abu Dhabi Knight Riders; 187/8 (20 overs)
Shayan Jahangir 99 (54); Jason Holder 2/22 (4 overs)		Andre Russell 53* (33); Waqar Salamkheil 3/34 (4 overs)

Dubai Capitals won by 9 runs
Sheikh Zayed Cricket Stadium, Abu Dhabi
Umpires: Akbar Ali (UAE) and Martin Saggers (Eng)
Player of the match: Shayan Jahangir (Dubai Capitals)

- Abu Dhabi Knight Riders won the toss and elected to field.

Match 17
16 December 2025
18:30 (N)
Scorecard

Abu Dhabi Knight Riders; 181/5 (20 overs)	v	Desert Vipers; 180/6 (20 overs)
Liam Livingstone 76 (48); Lockie Ferguson 3/34 (4 overs)		Max Holden 52 (43); Andre Russell 2/16 (3 overs)

Abu Dhabi Knight Riders won by 1 run
Sheikh Zayed Cricket Stadium, Abu Dhabi
Umpires: Wayne Knights (NZ) and Martin Saggers (Eng)
Player of the match: Liam Livingstone (Abu Dhabi Knight Riders)

- Desert Vipers won the toss and elected to field.

Match 19
18 December 2025
18:30 (N)
Scorecard

Gulf Giants; 165/7 (20 overs)	v	Abu Dhabi Knight Riders; 167/6 (19.2 overs)
Rahmanullah Gurbaz 72 (45); Piyush Chawla 4/27 (4 overs)		Alex Hales 46 (39); Tabraiz Shamsi 3/23 (4 overs)

Abu Dhabi Knight Riders won by 4 wickets
Sheikh Zayed Cricket Stadium, Abu Dhabi
Umpires: Aasif Iqbal (UAE) and Wayne Knights (NZ)
Player of the match: Piyush Chawla (Abu Dhabi Knight Riders)

- Abu Dhabi Knight Riders won the toss and elected to field.

Match 21
20 December 2025
14:00
Scorecard

Abu Dhabi Knight Riders; 187/4 (20 overs)	v	MI Emirates; 152 (20 overs)
Nicholas Pooran 40* (24); Ajay Kumar 2/42 (4 overs)		Brandon McMullen 64 (49); Zahoor Khan 3/16 (4 overs)

MI Emirates won by 35 runs
Sheikh Zayed Cricket Stadium, Abu Dhabi
Umpires: Akbar Ali (UAE) and Martin Saggers (Eng)
Player of the match: Zahoor Khan (MI Emirates)

- Abu Dhabi Knight Riders won the toss and elected to field.

Match 25
22 December 2025
18:30 (N)
Scorecard

Abu Dhabi Knight Riders; 134/9 (20 overs)	v	Sharjah Warriorz; 135/6 (20 overs)
Sherfane Rutherford 44 (36); Adil Rashid 3/18 (4 overs)		James Rew 42* (29); Jason Holder 2/25 (4 overs)

Sharjah Warriorz won by 4 wickets
Sheikh Zayed Cricket Stadium, Abu Dhabi
Umpires: Akbar Ali (UAE) and Martin Saggers (Eng)
Player of the match: Adil Rashid (Sharjah Warriorz)

- Abu Dhabi Knight Riders won the toss and elected to bat.

Match 30
28 December 2025
18:30 (N)
Scorecard

Abu Dhabi Knight Riders; 179/1 (20 overs)	v	Gulf Giants; 147/9 (20 overs)
Michael Pepper 83 (51); Aayan Afzal Khan 1/34 (4 overs)		Moeen Ali 79 (49); Andre Russell 3/13 (2 overs)

Abu Dhabi Knight Riders won by 32 runs
Dubai International Cricket Stadium, Dubai
Umpires: Martin Saggers (Eng) and Rod Tucker (Aus)
Player of the match: Michael Pepper (Abu Dhabi Knight Riders)

- Gulf Giants won the toss and elected to field.
- Abu Dhabi Knight Riders qualified for the playoffs as a result of this match.

== Playoffs ==
=== Bracket ===
Qualifier 1
30 December 2025 — Abu Dhabi
1	Desert Vipers	233/1 (20 overs)
2	MI Emirates	188/7 (20 overs)
Eliminator
1 January 2026 — Dubai
3	Dubai Capitals	108 (16.2 overs)
4	Abu Dhabi Knight Riders	158/7 (20 overs)

Qualifier 2
2 January 2026 — Sharjah
Q1L	MI Emirates	122/3 (16.1 overs)
EW	Abu Dhabi Knight Riders	120/8 (20 overs)

Final
4 January 2026 — Dubai
Q1W	Desert Vipers	182/4 (20 overs)
Q2W	MI Emirates	136 (18.3 overs)

=== Eliminator ===
Eliminator
1 January 2026
18:30 (N)
Scorecard

Abu Dhabi Knight Riders; 158/7 (20 overs)	v	Dubai Capitals; 108 (16.2 overs)
Michael Pepper 72 (49); Mohammad Nabi 3/25 (4 overs)		Mohammad Nabi 27 (21); Sunil Narine 3/12 (3 overs)

Abu Dhabi Knight Riders won by 50 runs
Dubai International Cricket Stadium, Dubai
Umpires: Aasif Iqbal (UAE) and Rod Tucker (Aus)
Player of the match: Sunil Narine (Abu Dhabi Knight Riders)

- Abu Dhabi Knight Riders won the toss and elected to bat.

=== Qualifier 2 ===
Qualifier 2
2 January 2026
18:30 (N)
Scorecard

Abu Dhabi Knight Riders; 120/8 (20 overs)	v	MI Emirates; 122/3 (16.1 overs)
Alishan Sharafu 50* (40); AM Ghazanfar 3/24 (4 overs)		Tom Banton 64* (53); Ajay Kumar 2/13 (3 overs)

MI Emirates won by 7 wickets
Sharjah Cricket Stadium, Sharjah
Umpires: Martin Saggers (Eng) and Shiju Sam (UAE)
Player of the match: Shakib Al Hasan (MI Emirates)

- MI Emirates won the toss and elected to field.
