= Rabiul Hoque =

Bangladeshi-born Emirati cricket umpire

Personal information
- Born: 1 January 1983 (age 43); Chittagong, Bangladesh

Umpiring information
- T20Is umpired: 1 (2016)
- Source: Cricinfo, 14 February 2016

Rabiul Hoque (born 1 January 1983) is a Bangladeshi-born international cricket umpire based in the United Arab Emirates. He was born in Chittagong, Bangladesh, and emigrated to the UAE in 2005. He made his debut as an international umpire on 14 February 2016, in a Twenty20 International (T20I) match between Ireland and the United Arab Emirates.

== See also ==
- List of Twenty20 International cricket umpires
