= Moza Sultan Al Kaabi =

Emirati orthopedic surgeon (1984–2015)

- Born: 1984; Fujeirah, United Arab Emirates
- Died: August 20, 2015 (aged 30–31); Dubai
- Resting place: Madhab, Fujeirah; 25°8′7″N 56°19′41″E
- Occupation: Orthopedic surgeon
- Known for: Orthopedics

Moza Sultan Al Kaabi (1984-2015; Arabic: موزة سلطان الكعبي) was an Emirati orthopedic surgeon, known to be the first Emirati woman orthopedic surgeon.

== Biography ==
Born in Fujeirah in 1984, a northern Emirate in the United Arab Emirates, Al Kaabi completed her school education at Glasgow, Scotland and prepared for a career in medicine in England by learning English. Moving to China, she graduated in general medicine and surgery from Xinjiang and secured a master's degree in orthopaedics from Tianjin, becoming the first Emarati woman orthopedic surgeon.

Al Kaabi was one of the first woman inductees into the UAE National Military Service and worked at Zayed Military Hospital, Abu Dhabi. She was a goodwill ambassador for the Organisation of the Southern Philippines Muslim and Non-Muslim Unity and Development Association (SPMUDA), a non governmental organization affiliated to the United Nations Economic and Social Council.

Al Kaabi lived in Fujeirah and, on 20 August 2015, she met with a road accident at Dubai By-pass Road, while driving from her work place in Abu Dhabi to her home and died on the spot. She was 31. The funeral was held at Omar Bin Abdul Aziz mosque in Madhab, a small village in Fujeirah.

== See also ==
- List of Emiratis
