= Reem Al Marzouqi =

Emirati engineer and inventor

Reem Marzouqi
- Born: c. 1990 (age c. 34); United Arab Emirates
- Education: United Arab Emirates University (BA)
- Children: 2 sons

External videos
- “Takamul Program Inventor Features (English) Reem Al Marzouqi”, Nomad Media
- Find your inner inventor: Reem Al Marzouqi, TEDx Talks Manipal University Dubai

Reem Al Marzouqi (Arabic: ريم المرزوقي; born c. 1990) is an Emirati engineer and the first female citizen of the United Arab Emirates to be granted a patent in the United States of America for designing a car that can be driven without hands.

== Biography ==
Al Marzouqi grew up in a “house full of boys” in the United Arab Emirates, which she credits for her exposure and passion for cars. She started university at United Arab Emirates University in 2008 with goals to become an architect. Stating that she was not, nor was she ever an A student, she graduated, receiving a bachelor's degree in architectural engineering. While studying at UAEU she worked with engineering consultants in Abu Dhabi and Dubai, including Musanada, a building construction management and facilities management firm. For hands-on engineering, she won second place in Emirates National Skills Carpentry Competition. She was the first and only female participant.

Reem received a U.S. patent for her original invention, a "Lower Extremity Vehicle Navigation Control System"; since then the patent has been granted approval in Japan as well. The system uses a steering lever, an acceleration lever and a brake lever which are entirely foot-controlled, allowing people to drive a car without the use of their upper body. The system is the first of its kind, and the UAEU also has patents pending in China and the European Union. It has become one of the remarkable successes of the Takamul program.

Al Marzouqi was challenged to come up with a patentable idea in a class on ethics at her university – leading her to recall a TV interview on Inside Edition with Jessica Cox, the world's first licensed armless pilot as she mentioned in her interview difficulties of driving cars for long distances using only her feet. When she first approached her professor with her sketches and ideas, he initially dismissed her and told her to focus on her studies rather than inventing. However, upon seeing the sketches, the professor encouraged al Marzouqi to apply for a US Patent. This speaks to her problem-solving mentality - solving real problems instead of mindlessly inventing.

Reem has since participated in the Expo Science International exhibition. Her invention was included in the British Museum's A History of the World in 100 Objects exhibition, as displayed at Manarat Al Saadiyat, Abu Dhabi, from April–August 2014. It represented the future, and was heralded by Neil MacGregor, Director of the British Museum, as "a brilliant example of human beings striving to find new things."

Based on Reem's academic achievement and extracurricular activities, she was selected by the Academy of Achievement to participate as 2014 innovation and technology delegate at the 51st Annual International Achievement Summit in San Francisco, California. Al Marzouqi also holds two Guinness World Records, both set in 2014 – largest flag lifted by helium balloons and longest wedding dress. Reem designed both feats and enlisted The Dubai Club for the Disabled to work on the wedding dress to highlight their talents. Al Marzouqi has also featured in the Arabian Business 50 Most Influential Women in the Arab World in 2018 and 100 smartest people in the UAE lists.

Since graduating from college Reem has been working with Abu Dhabi Airport on a project to upgrade the Midfield Airport Terminal. This project aims to transform the Abu Dhabi airport into a technologically advanced aviation hub.

Al Marzouqi is married with two sons.

== See also ==
- List of Emiratis
- Women in the United Arab Emirates
- Women in Arab societies
