= Aquib =

Aquib is a male given name. Notable people with the name include:

- Aquib Afzaal (born 1985), English cricket player
- Auqib Nabi (born 1996), Indian cricket player
- Aquib Nazir, Indian cricket player

== See also ==
- Aqib, a male given name (includes Aaqib)
