= Shahzad Altaf =

Pakistani cricketer

Personal information
- Full name: Shahzad Altaf Hussain
- Born: 6 October 1957 (age 69); Peshawar, Pakistan
- Batting: Right-handed
- Bowling: Right-arm medium
- Role: Bowler
- Relatives: Rameez Shahzad (son)

International information
- National side: United Arab Emirates (1994–1998)
- ODI debut (cap 15): 16 February 1996 v South Africa
- Last ODI: 1 March 1996 v Netherlands

Domestic team information
- Years: Team
- 1975: Lahore B (Pakistan)
- Source: CricketArchive, 3 December 2016

Shahzad Altaf Hussain (born 6 October 1957) is a Pakistani-born former cricketer who played for the United Arab Emirates national cricket team between 1994 and 1998. He played as a right-arm pace bowler, and opened the bowling in two matches at the 1996 World Cup. Shahzad was born in Pakistan, and played first-class cricket there before emigrating to the UAE.

== Pakistan career ==
Shahzad was born in Peshawar, Pakistan. In October 1975, aged 18, he played two matches of first-class cricket for Lahore B in the Patron's Trophy. He opened the bowling with Jamshed Hussain on debut against Hyderabad, taking 4/25 in the first innings and 1/21 in the second. He had less success in his second game, taking 1/88 and 0/18 against Pakistan Universities.

== UAE career ==
After immigrating to the UAE, Shahzad made his debut for the UAE national team at the 1994 ABN-AMRO Trophy, a triangular tournament in Nairobi that also featured Kenya and the Netherlands. He made his List A debut the following year, when the UAE hosted the 1995 Interface Cup (with India A, Pakistan A, and Sri Lanka A as participants). Shahzad played another three List A games for the UAE in early 1996, when the team participated in Pakistan's domestic one-day competition, the Wills Kings Cup.

Shahzad was the second-oldest member of the UAE squad at the 1996 World Cup, after Shaukat Dukanwala. He played in two of his team's matches, both of which held One Day International (ODI) status. Shahzad opened the bowling with Johanne Samarasekera against South Africa in the first match of the tournament, but was taken out of the attack after conceding 22 runs from three overs. He did not return to the line-up until the UAE's final game, against the Netherlands. In that match, he took 1/15 from ten overs, including three maidens.

A few months after the World Cup, Shahzad represented the UAE at the 1996 ACC Trophy in Malaysia. His best performance at the tournament was 3/40 in the semi-final against Fiji. Shahzad made his final international appearances at the age of 41, playing in the 1998 ACC Trophy in Nepal. He took 6/13 from ten overs against Japan, for which he was named man of the match, and then took 2/5 from 7.1 overs in the next match against Nepal.

== Personal life ==
Shahzad's son, Rameez Shahzad, has also played international cricket for the UAE. They are the first father–son combination to play for the UAE.
