= Sohail Butt =

Pakistani-born cricketer

Sohail Rasheed Butt
Personal information
- Born: 6 June 1966 (age 59); Lahore, Pakistan
- Batting: Right-handed
- Bowling: Right-arm fast-medium
- Source: CricInfo, 15 August 2022

Sohail Butt (born 6 June 1966) is a former international cricketer who played for the United Arab Emirates cricket team. After one first-class game and one List A game for Lahore City Blues in 1985–86, Butt next appeared on cricket radar playing for his adopted country of the United Arab Emirates in two One Day Internationals in the Pepsi Austral-Asia Cup in 1993–94, where he played against India and Pakistan in Sharjah, UAE. Butt also competed in the 1993–94 ICC Trophy.

== Early and personal life ==
Butt was born to a middle-class family in Lahore and despite being named ahead of the likes of Waqar, Wasim and Aaqib in the domestic fast-bowling circuit in the 1980s, he had to quit cricket in Pakistan and leave for UAE where he worked minimum-wage jobs to feed his family in Lahore. But the turning point in his career came when he was noticed by UAE cricket officials in the early 1990s while he practiced in the nets in Abu Dhabi. Butt got an immediate call-up for the national team camp where he was able to impress his case upon the selectors. During that time, when the UAE cricket team was in its formative phase, a bowler of Butt's caliber who could seam five in six deliveries, swing both ways and clock up to 90 mph was an obvious choice.

While the UAE team that later played the Australasia cup against India and Pakistan in 1993-94 had almost no known UAE nationals, Butt was the only Pakistani who managed to bag two wickets against the formidable Indian batting line-up. Had a catch of his bowling taken on the long-off boundary, Butt could also have taken the prized scalp of the great Sachin Tendulkar. Butt was also named in the UAE's squad for the 1996 Cricket World Cup but he couldn't participate for personal reasons.

== Retirement ==
Butt's career came to an end with other Pakistani/Indian players who earlier showed up in UAE colors as the team went into sidelines after the first round defeat in the 1996 World Cup. Butt settled in Lahore after retirement and the rumors had it that he was offered a role in Lahore Badshahs, a team composed of ex-Pakistani International cricketers captained by the legendary Inzamam-ul-Haq that was to tour India for the infamous Indian Cricket League (ICL) in 2008. Later, Butt joined the Pakistan Cricket Board (PCB) in an informal capacity with a role to coach and reform club cricket in the walled-city of Lahore, his native town. He coached in his parent club "Victorious" in the Iqbal Park Lahore and a batch of young fast bowlers trained under his wing.

== Political career ==
Butt joined the Imran Khan led Pakistan Tehreek-e-Insaf in 1996 and was one of its earliest members. While his cricketing connection with Khan would've lead him to join the party in the beginning as he was shortlisted for the national battery of fast bowlers during an U-19 camp by Khan himself in the 1980s, he became an ideological supporter of the PTI and was seen regularly on Television during PTI dharnas (sit-ins) and local political showdowns in the city of Lahore. Butt was very close to getting a party-nomination for the general elections of 2013 from the Constituency PP-142 (Lahore-VI) but was unsuccessful. However, he was later nominated to contest the local body polls to be held on October 30, 2015, for Union Council Chairman of UC-39 Lahore.

Butt has also held major positions in the party, including his last stint as the President of PTI sports-wing Lahore, and is considered one of its most authentic political workers in the city. The youth which forms the majority of the membership of the party often refers to him as the 'Tiger of PTI' for his loyalty/allegiance with Imran Khan, an unfailing commitment with the party and an outstanding deterrence against repressive dictatorships during the process of restoration of Democracy in the country.

== Social Work ==
Apart from active politics, Butt has also chosen to invest his cricketing fame and post-cricketing time in social, development and public welfare activities. In the aftermath of the devastating 2005 Kashmir earthquake that took away thousands of lives and ruined cities infrastructurally, Butt volunteered and paid a massive contribution to the re-settlement of the displaced. According to rough estimates, he constructed around 200 houses by hand and with the help of local communities often engaging/convincing investors from Lahore and other cities of influence for funding. Reportedly, he lived in the ruined city of Muzaffarabad and Bagh for around 2 years during the re-settlement process and went through the roughest chills of the region which even natives found immensely hard to survive without a real shelter.
