= Salman Farooq =

Emirati cricketer (born 1981)

Personal information
- Born: 26 November 1981 (age 44); Karachi, Pakistan
- Batting: Right-handed
- Bowling: Right-arm Offbreak
- Role: Bowler
- Relatives: Qais Farooq (brother)

International information
- National side: United Arab Emirates
- Only ODI (cap 54): 30 November 2014 v Afghanistan
- Source: ESPNcricinfo, 30 November 2014

Salman Farooq (born 26 November 1981) is an Emarati cricketer who played for the United Arab Emirates national cricket team. He made his One Day International debut for the United Arab Emirates against Afghanistan on 30 November 2014. Farooq was a part of the UAE squad for the Asia Cup in 2008 held in Pakistan and named in the squad for the 2015 ICC Cricket World Cup. He has also represented the UAE under-19 cricket team in the Youth Asia Cup.
