= Andre de Lange =

South African cricketer (born 1984)

Personal information
- Full name: Andre Dawid de Lange
- Born: 29 February 1984 (age 42); Johannesburg, Transvaal
- Batting: Right-handed
- Bowling: Right-arm medium
- Role: Batsman
- Relatives: Cornelius de Lange (uncle); Con de Lange (cousin)

Domestic team information
- Years: Team
- 2006/07–2007/08: Free State
- 2009/09: Boland
- Source: CricketArchive, 16 May 2016

Andre Dawid de Lange (born 29 February 1984) is a South African cricketer who played for the Free State cricket team and Boland cricket team before playing for the Singapore national cricket team from 2013 to 2014. He is a right-handed top-order batsman who bowled medium pace. He was born at Johannesburg.
