= Rashed Ahmed =

Emirati footballer (born 1986)

Personal information
- Full name: Rashed Ahmed Al Hammadi
- Date of birth: 6 August 1986 (age 40)
- Place of birth: United Arab Emirates
- Height: 1.78 m (5 ft 10 in)
- Position: Goalkeeper

Youth career
- Al-Sharjah

Senior career*
Years	Team	Apps	(Gls)
2007–2019	Al-Sharjah		
2019–2022	Al-Hamriyah		
- * Club domestic league appearances and goals

Rashed Ahmed (Arabic:راشد أحمد; born 6 August 1986) is an Emirati footballer who played as a goalkeeper.
