= Andri Berenger =

Sri Lankan cricketer (born 1991)

Personal information
- Full name: Andri Raffaelo Berenger
- Born: 29 August 1991 (age 35); Colombo, Sri Lanka
- Batting: Right-handed
- Role: Opening batsman

International information
- National sides: United Arab Emirates (2014–2015); Qatar (2021–present)
- ODI debut (cap 53): 28 November 2014; UAE v Afghanistan
- Last ODI: 15 March 2015; UAE v West Indies
- T20I debut (cap 19): 23 October 2021; Qatar v Bahrain
- Last T20I: 29 October 2021; Qatar v Kuwait

Domestic team information
- Years: Team
- 2008: Seeduwa Raddoluwa
- 2010–2011: Colombo
- 2015: Saracens Sports Club

Career statistics
Competition	ODI	FC	LA	T20
Matches	10	5	23	7
Runs scored	205	149	411	153
Batting average	20.50	16.55	18.68	21.85
100s/50s	0/2	0/0	0/3	0/1
Top score	66	35	66*	50
Catches/stumpings	2/0	5/1	12/2	3/0
- Source: ESPNcricinfo, 29 October 2021

Andri Raffaelo Berenger (Sinhala: ඇන්ඩ්‍රි බෙරෙන්ජර්; born 29 August 1991) is a Sri Lankan cricketer. He is a right-handed batsman who has played for the United Arab Emirates and for Qatar.

== Personal life ==
Berenger was born in Colombo on 29 August 1991. His father Kenham Berenger was a Sri Lankan boxing champion. He grew up in the UAE where his parents were expatriate workers. Berenger represented the UAE in cricket at the Under-15 Gulf Cup in Bahrain before winning a sports scholarship to attend St. Peter's College, Colombo.

== Cricket career ==
=== Sri Lanka ===
Berenger represented the Sri Lanka national under-19 cricket team at the 2010 Under-19 Cricket World Cup in New Zealand.

Berenger made his cricketing debut in a List A match for Seeduwa Raddoluwa in December 2008 against Moratuwa Sports Club. Later in the same week, he made a single first-class appearance for the side, in the 2008-09 Premier Championship.

Berenger later played for Sinhalese Sports Club and Colombo Cricket Club.

=== United Arab Emirates ===
He made his One Day International debut for the United Arab Emirates against Afghanistan on 28 November 2014. He represented the UAE at the 2015 Cricket World Cup in Australia and New Zealand.

=== Qatar ===
In October 2021, he was named in Qatar's Twenty20 International (T20I) squad for the Group A matches in the 2021 ICC Men's T20 World Cup Asia Qualifier. He made his T20I debut on 23 October 2021, for Qatar against Bahrain.
