= Aqib =

Aqib and Aaqib are male given names. Notable people with these names include:

- Aqib Ilyas (born 1992), Omani cricketer
- Aqib Javed (born 1997), Pakistani cricketer
- Aaqib Javed (born 1972), Pakistani cricketer and coach
- Aqib Khan (born 1994), Pakistani actor
- Aaqib Khan (born 2003), Indian cricketer
- Aqib Shah (born 1995), Pakistani cricketer
- Aqib Talib (born 1986), American American football player

== See also ==
- Aquib
