= Umar Waheed =

Pakistani cricketer (born 1994)

Personal information
- Born: 26 April 1994 (age 32); Lahore, Punjab, Pakistan
- Source: Cricinfo, 21 December 2015

Umar Waheed (born 26 April 1994) is a Pakistani cricketer. He was the leading run-scorer for Rawalpindi in the 2018–19 Quaid-e-Azam Trophy, with 308 runs in seven matches. In September 2019, he was named in Northern's squad for the 2019–20 Quaid-e-Azam Trophy tournament.
