= Amal Al-Agroobi =

Emirati film director

- Occupation: Documentary filmmaker
- Years active: 2012–present
- Known for: Producer at ALAGROOBI Films
- Notable work: A Brain that Sings, Half Emirati

Amal Al-Agroobi is an Emirati documentary filmmaker, director, producer and writer. Her career as a director began in 2012 when her first short documentary Half Emirati premiered at Dubai International Film Festival and was nominated for best film. She is also founder and owner of the production company ALAGROOBI Films. Al-Agroobi has raised money for many of her films through crowdfunding.

== Early life ==
Amal Al-Agroobi grew up around Europe to a Syrian mother and an Emirati father from Sharjah. She completed her BSc in Biomedical Sciences from University of Durham and MSc in Neurosciences from University College London. Later on in Abu Dhabi, she worked as a technician in a laboratory. When Al-Agroobi began to take an interest in the cinema industry, she decided to leave her job and sign up in a media training program.

Over the years, Al-Agroobi developed a variety of perspectives in her films, one of them is narrating stories with contemporary Arab focus. Moreover, she created roadmaps that strengthen the connection between the Arab world and the West, and constantly examined cultural intersections.

== Career ==
Al-Agroobi began her cinema career as a director. Her directorial debut was Half Emirati, a short film about Emirati children of mixed cultures facing certain obstacles, which was released in 2012. The film was produced by her own production company Alagroobi films UAE. Half Emirati, which is a documentary was screened in both the Dubai International Film Festival and the Gulf Film Festival.

Her next critically acclaimed project was The Brain That Sings. The movie received Emirates NBD People's Choice Award in December 2013 at the Dubai International Film Festival. She completed a goodwill documentary for The PCRF charity Climb of Hope, and it was released in 2015.

She has also acted in an episode of The Misfits. Al-Agroobi's social and humanitarian work caused her to work on a TV-web series titled "Proud to be a Sharjonian", showing off her hometown of Sharjah.

Her first fictional narrative short movie was released in 2016 titled "Under the Hat", about a pious mosque prayer caller who begins to lose his voice and turns to his neighbor, a vocalist in a music band, seeking a substitute. The film was the winner of Doha Film Institute grant for the category short movies.

In 2014, her life story was published in a book titled "Those Who inspire" showcasing 60 inspiring Emiratis and again in 2015 in a coffee-table book labeled "Emirati Woman Achievers" where she was one of the 21 people who shared their story of inspiration in the middle east.

In 2019, Al-Agroobi began her sci-fi journey when she published her first sci-fi short film Vanish In Smoke, it tells a story about an advanced world where the aging of minds is reversible. In 2021, she released the second film The Protocol, about an extremely expensive medicine that has the potential to increase life expectancy by 50 years. Both films were created in just 48 hours for the sci-fi London film festival challenge.

In her latest work, Ladies Coffee, she experiments with the horror genre encapsulating Arabic folklore such as coffee-cup reading. The film, currently in post-production, is shot in London and is expected to be released later in 2023.

== Awards ==
Year	Awards
2013	Digital Studio Awards for Best Up and Coming Filmmaker of the Year
2014	Digital Studio Awards Best Production (special commendation) for The Brain That Sings
2014	The People's Choice Award at the Dubai International Film Festival
2014	Women in Film and Television honored as Best New Director

== See also ==
- Manal bin Amr
