= Saeed Khalifa Humeid Al Rumaithi =

Government minister of the United Arab Emirates

Saeed Khalifa Humeid Al Rumaithi is the former secretary of the Minister of labor Ministry of Labor in Abu Dhabi.

He is the eldest child of Khalifa Humeid Abdulla Al Rumaithi. Saeed worked in the Abu Dhabi Culture and Heritage Department prior to being offered the position of The secretary of the minister of labor. He then worked in the Ministry of labor for about two decades. He resigned in late 2004.

As of 2013 he was a member of: Zayed Charitable Foundation Board of Trustees (UAE), GIC Board of Directors (UAE), Founder of Care Institute (UAE), and Co-Founder of Manasek (UAE).
