= Ali Al-Saadi =

Emirati association football player (born 1982)

Ali Al-Saadi علي السعدي
Personal information
- Full name: Ali Saeed Khamis Al-Saadi
- Date of birth: 15 July 1982 (age 44)
- Place of birth: Emirates
- Height: 1.81 m (5 ft 11 in)
- Positions: Defensive midfielder; defender

Senior career*
Years	Team	Apps	(Gls)
2004–2011	Al Dhafra		
2011–2015	Al-Sharjah	70	(0)
2015–2016	Al-Fujairah		
2016	→ Ittihad Kalba (loan)		
2016–2017	Ittihad Kalba	25	(0)
2017–2019	Dibba Al-Fujairah	27	(0)
- * Club domestic league appearances and goals

Ali Al-Saadi (Arabic: علي السعدي) (born 15 July 1982) is an Emirati footballer. He currently plays as a defensive midfielder or defender.

== Career ==
He formerly played for Al Dhafra, Al-Sharjah, Al-Fujairah, Ittihad Kalba, and Dibba Al-Fujairah.
