= Hawaa Al Mansoori =

Emirati physician, inventor and politician

Her Excellency Hawaa Al Thahak Al Mansoori
- د حوا سعيد سالم الضحاك المنصوري
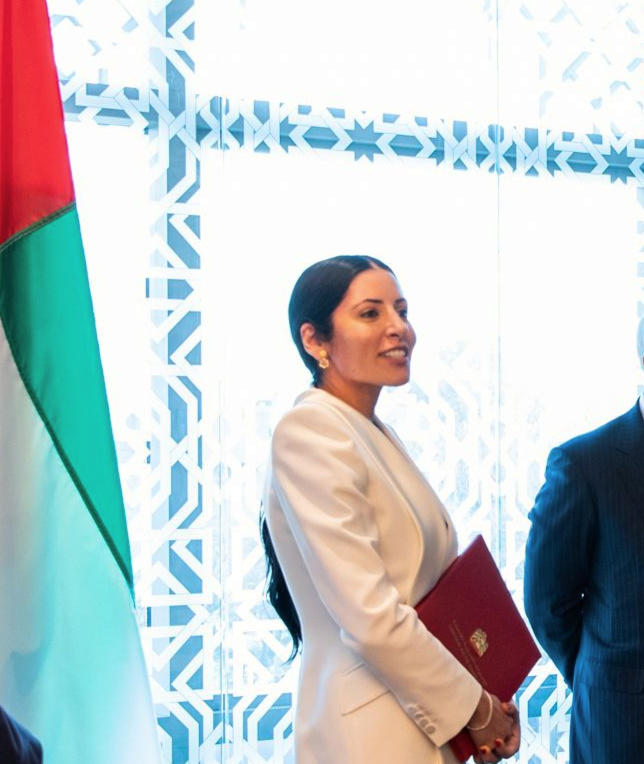
- Al Mansoori in 2021

Member of the Federal National Council
- Incumbent
- Assumed office November 2019
- President: Mohamed bin Zayed Al Nahyan
- Prime Minister: Mohammed bin Rashid Al Maktoum

Personal details
- Born: Abu Dhabi
- Education: George Washington University School of Medicine & Health Sciences; University of Maryland
- Awards: UAE Pioneers Award (2014); Federal Personality of the year (2019)

Hawaa Al Thahak Al Mansoori (Arabic: حوا سعيد سالم الضحاك المنصوري) is an Emirati physician and politician. She was appointed to the Federal National Council of the United Arab Emirates in 2019. An endocrinologist, she is executive director of the Intramural Research Division at the Abu Dhabi Stem Cell Center and Deputy Medical Director of Imperial College London Diabetes Centre in Abu Dhabi.

== Education ==
Al Mansoori was the first Emirati woman to be awarded a UAE Presidential Scholarship to study medicine in the United States. She completed her undergraduate studies at the University of Maryland, receiving a BSc in Neurobiology & Physiology and a BSc in psychology.

In 2001 Al Mansoori was an undergraduate research fellow at the Howard Hughes Medical Institute, working under Sarah Tishkoff. Her research has been published in peer-reviewed journals including the American Journal of Gastroenterology and the journal of the American Diabetes Association (see § Publications).

She has a Doctor of Medicine (MD) degree from George Washington University School of Medicine, where she then went on to complete both her residency and fellowship. In 2013 she became double board certified in Internal Medicine and Endocrinology.

In 2013, she moved back to the UAE. She was presented at the 2014 World Government Summit by Deputy Prime Minister, Sheikh Mansour Bin Zayed Al Nahyan as an example of success in education and innovation.

== Career ==
=== Healthcare ===
Al Mansoori is chairman and co-founder of SonoStik LLC, a company created to develop vascular access technologies.

Since 2016 she has been the Deputy Medical Director of Imperial College London Diabetes Centre in Abu Dhabi. Since 2014 she has been a consultant endocrinologist at ICLDC and Cleveland Clinic Abu Dhabi. She is the executive director of Intramural Research at Abu Dhabi Stem Cell Center (ADSCC).

=== Politics ===
In November 2018 Al Mansoori was appointed to the Federal National Council (FNC) of the United Arab Emirates as a representative of Abu Dhabi. During the COVID-19 pandemic she expressed support for a government initiative to grant physicians and their families 10-year residency visas.

== Awards and honors ==
- 1999: Presidential Scholarship to study medicine in the United States. First Emirati woman to be receive this award.
- 2014: UAE Pioneers Award, received from UAE Prime Minister, Sheikh Mohammed bin Rashid Al Maktoum.
- 2019: Federal Personality of the year, received from Sheikh Nahyan bin Mubarak Al Nahyan.

== Publications ==
- Ramsay D, Aragon G, Almansouri H, Bashir S, Borum M. Strongyloides and Elevated Liver Associated Enzymes: An Infection Presenting 16 Years Following Immigration from an Endemic Area: 850. American Journal of Gastroenterology. 2009 Oct 1;104:S313.
- Khosla S, Almansouri H, Korshak L, Sheriff H, Aiken M, Himmerick K, Namata-Elengwe I, Kheirbek R, Nylen E, Kokkinos P. Effects of Lifestyle Intervention for Veterans (LIVe) Program on Cardiometabolic Parameters in African American Veterans With Type 2 Diabetes Mellitus. InDIABETES 2013 Jul 1 (Vol. 62, pp. A632-A632). 1701 N BEAUREGARD ST, ALEXANDRIA, VA 22311-1717 USA: AMER DIABETES ASSOC.
