= Lahiru Jayaratne =

Sri Lankan cricketer (born 1991)

Personal information
- Born: 12 October 1991 (age 35); Matale, Sri Lanka
- Nickname: L.J

Domestic team information
- Years: Team
- 2024- current: Goatacre
- Source: ESPNcricinfo, 7 January 2017

Lahiru Jayaratne (born 12 October 1991) is a Sri Lankan cricketer. He made his first-class debut for Ragama Cricket Club in the 2011–12 Premier Trophy on 4 March 2012.
