= Amjad Khan (Emirati cricketer) =

Emirati cricketer (born 1989)

Personal information
- Full name: Amjad Gul Khan
- Born: 25 February 1989 (age 37); Dubai, United Arab Emirates
- Batting: Right-handed
- Bowling: Legbreak

International information
- National side: United Arab Emirates
- T20I debut (cap 21): 22 November 2015 v Oman
- Last T20I: 18 December 2016 v Afghanistan
- Source: Cricinfo, 21 October 2018

Amjad Khan (born 25 February 1989) is a cricketer who played for the United Arab Emirates national cricket team. He made his Twenty20 International (T20I) debut for the UAE against Oman on 22 November 2015. In November 2021, he was selected to play for the Kandy Warriors following the players' draft for the 2021 Lanka Premier League.
