= Krishna Chandran =

Emirati cricketer (born 1984)

Personal information
- Full name: Karate Krishna Chandran
- Born: 24 August 1984 (age 42); Kollengode, Kerala, India
- Nickname: Krishna Karate
- Batting: Right-handed
- Bowling: Right-arm medium
- Role: All Rounder

International information
- National side: United Arab Emirates
- ODI debut (cap 50): 2 May 2014 v Afghanistan
- Last ODI: 14 August 2016 v Scotland
- ODI shirt no.: 36

Domestic team information
- Years: Team
- 2002–2003: Kerala U19
- 2007–2008: Kerala

Career statistics
Competition	ODI	List A	T20
Matches	12	21	1
Runs scored	134	374	5
Batting average	16.75	26.71	5
100s/50s	0/0	0/3	0/0
Top score	43	52*	5
Balls bowled	418	642	12
Wickets	7	13	0
Bowling average	61.57	48.38	–
5 wickets in innings	0	0	–
10 wickets in match	0	0	–
Best bowling	3/45	3/45	–
Catches/stumpings	5/–	7/–	1/–
- Source: ESPNcricinfo, 27 February 2016

Krishna Chandran (born 24 August 1984), also known as Krishna Chandran Karate, is an Indian-born cricketer who played for the United Arab Emirates national cricket team. He played in twelve One Day International matches, including five matches in the World Cup. He represented Kerala cricket team in domestic cricket and became the first Keralite to represent the UAE national cricket team.
