= Asif Iqbal (Emirati cricketer) =

Emirati cricketer (born 1984)

Personal information
- Born: 12 January 1984 (age 42); Bahawalpur, Pakistan
- Batting: Right-handed
- Role: Opening batsman

International information
- National side: United Arab Emirates
- Only ODI (cap 58): 16 November 2015 v Hong Kong
- Source: Cricinfo, 23 January 2022

Asif Iqbal (born 12 January 1984) is a Pakistani-born cricketer who played for the United Arab Emirates national cricket team in 2015. He played first-class cricket for Bahawalpur in Pakistan, before moving to the UAE around 2007. After impressing for Danube Lions in UAE domestic cricket, he was named in the UAE national squad in May 2015. He made his One Day International debut against Hong Kong in the 2015–17 ICC World Cricket League Championship on 16 November 2015.
