= Nasir Aziz =

Emirati cricketer (born 1986)

Personal information
- Full name: Nasir Aziz
- Born: 15 March 1979 (age 47); Karachi, Sind, Pakistan
- Batting: Right-handed
- Bowling: Right-arm offbreak
- Role: Bowler

Career statistics
Competition	FC	List A	T20
Matches	2	13	12
Runs scored	5	92	23
Batting average	2.50	15.33	4.60
100s/50s	0/0	0/0	0/0
Top score	4	28	16
Balls bowled	305	612	252
Wickets	6	35	20
Bowling average	20.00	11.05	14.55
5 wickets in innings	1	2	0
10 wickets in match	0	0	0
Best bowling	5/48	5/16	3/20
Catches/stumpings	0/–	3/–	6/–
- Source: ESPN Cricinfo, 16 March 2014

Nasir Aziz (Urdu: ناصر عزیز; born 16 June 1986) is a Pakistani-born cricketer who played for the United Arab Emirates national cricket team. He is a right-handed batsman and right-arm off-break bowler. He was named in the UAE squad for the 2014 ICC World Twenty20.

== Career ==
Nasir made his first-class cricket debut against Canada on 1 August 2013. He made his List A cricket debut against Bermuda national cricket team. He made his One Day International debut for the United Arab Emirates against Afghanistan on 2 December 2014. He made his Twenty20 International debut against the Netherlands in the 2015 ICC World Twenty20 Qualifier tournament on 12 July 2015.

In the inaugural ACC Emerging Teams Cup held in 2013, he was the leading wicket-taker with 17 scalps.

In the 2015 ICC Cricket World Cup held in Australia, in a clash against the West Indies he along with Amjad Javed set the joint highest ever partnership for the 7th wicket in ICC Cricket World Cup history (107). In fact, both Javed and Aziz became only the second pair in World Cup history to put on a 7th-wicket partnership in excess of 100 runs.
