= Shaukat Dukanwala =

Indian-born Emirati cricketer (born 1957)

Personal information
- Full name: Shaukat Fakirbhai Dukanwala
- Born: 21 January 1957 (age 69); Bombay, Maharashtra, India
- Batting: Right-handed
- Bowling: Right-arm offbreak
- Role: Bowler

International information
- National side: United Arab Emirates
- ODI debut: 16 February 1996 v South Africa
- Last ODI: 1 March 1996 v Netherlands

Domestic team information
- Years: Team
- 1980/81-1990/91: Baroda

Career statistics
Competition	ODI	FC	LA
Matches	5	16	8
Runs scored	84	297	97
Batting average	42.00	16.50	32.33
100s/50s	0/0	1/0	0/0
Top score	40*	121	40*
Balls bowled	198	2299	294
Wickets	6	27	6
Bowling average	25.50	45.07	40.50
5 wickets in innings	1	0	1
10 wickets in match	0	0	0
Best bowling	5/29	4/39	5/29
Catches/stumpings	2/–	22/–	2/–
- Source: CricInfo, 1 July 2026

Shaukat Fakirbhai Dukanwala (born 21 January 1957) is an Indian-born former cricketer who played for the United Arab Emirates national cricket team. He played five One Day Internationals for United Arab Emirates and was a member of the 1996 Cricket World Cup UAE team.
