= Muhammad Burhan =

Emirati cricketer (born 1985)

Muhammad Kaleem Burhan
Personal information
- Born: 1 October 1985 (age 41); Gujranwala, Pakistan
- Batting: Right-handed
- Role: Opening batsman

International information
- National side: United Arab Emirates
- T20I debut: 3 February 2016 v Netherlands
- Last T20I: 3 March 2016 v India

Career statistics
| Competition | T20I | FC | LA |
|---|---|---|---|
| Matches | 9 | 1 | 2 |
| Runs scored | 97 | 18 | 27 |
| Batting average | 10.77 | 9.00 | 13.50 |
| 100s/50s | 0/1 | 0/0 | 0/0 |
| Top score | 50 | 14 | 26 |
| Catches/stumpings | 1/– | 0/– | 0/- |
- Source: espncricinfo, 16 September 2016

Muhammad Kaleem Burhan (born 1 October 1985) is a Pakistani-born cricketer who played for the United Arab Emirates national cricket team. He made his first-class debut for the United Arab Emirates against the Netherlands in the 2015–17 ICC Intercontinental Cup on 21 January 2016. He made his List A debut for the UAE against the Netherlands in the 2015–17 ICC World Cricket League Championship on 27 January 2016. He made his Twenty20 International (T20I) debut against the Netherlands on 3 February 2016.
