= Usman Mushtaq =

Personal information
- Born: 5 November 1986 (age 40); Sialkot, Punjab, Pakistan
- Batting: Right-handed
- Bowling: Right-arm medium-fast
- Role: Batsman

International information
- National side: United Arab Emirates (2015–2016)

Domestic team information
- Years: Team
- 2002–2003: Sialkot (Pakistan)
- Source: CricketArchive, 19 February 2015

Usman Mushtaq (born 5 November 1986) is a Pakistani-born cricketer who played for the United Arab Emirates national cricket team. He made his debut for the UAE in November 2015. He has represented the UAE at One Day International (ODI) and Twenty20 International levels. Before emigrating to the UAE, he played first-class cricket for Sialkot in Pakistan and also represented the Pakistan under-19s.

== Career in Pakistan ==
Mushtaq was born in Sialkot, Punjab, Pakistan. He made his first-class debut for Sialkot in January 2003, aged 16, in a Quaid-e-Azam Trophy match against the Lahore Whites. On debut, he opened the batting with Shaiman Anwar (another future UAE international), and scored 67 runs from 115 balls in an opening partnership worth 177 runs. Mushtaq played one other Quaid-e-Azam match during the 2002–03 season, against Faisalabad. He again opened with Shaiman Anwar, scoring nine runs in the first innings and 27 runs in the second. Later in the season, in February and March 2003, Mushtaq twice played for Sialkot in the limited-overs National Bank of Pakistan Patron's Cup, appearing against Rawalpindi and Faisalabad.

In April 2005, when the Sri Lankan under-19s toured, Mushtaq was selected in the Pakistan under-19s squad. He played a single under-19 ODI, making nine runs from 18 balls, coming in fourth in the batting order. One of his under-19 teammates was a fellow Sialkoti, Arsalan Anwar, while his opponents included future Sri Lankan Test players Upul Tharanga, Chamara Kapugedera, Kosala Kulasekara, and Angelo Mathews. Mushtaq's last appearances in Pakistani domestic competitions came in December 2005, when he played for the Pakistan Army team in Grade II of the Patron's Trophy.

== Career in the UAE ==
After emigrating to the UAE, Mushtaq made his debut for the UAE national team in early November 2015, in a two-day match against Oman at Ajman Oval. Later in the month, he made his first-class debut for the UAE, playing an ICC Intercontinental Cup match against Hong Kong. His One Day International (ODI) debut came a few days later against the same team, in a World Cricket League Championship game. Mushtaq made his Twenty20 International debut for the UAE in February 2016, against Ireland. Later in the month, he also made appearances against Afghanistan in the 2016 Asia Cup Qualifier and against Pakistan in the 2016 Asia Cup.
