= Johanne Samarasekera =

Sri Lankan-Emirati cricketer (born 1968)

Personal information
- Born: 22 February 1968 (age 57); Colombo, Sri Lanka
- Batting: Right-handed
- Bowling: Right-arm medium-fast

International information
- National side: United Arab Emirates
- Source: CricInfo, 15 August 2022

Johanne Abeyratne Samarasekera (born 22 February 1968) is a Sri Lankan-born former cricketer who played for the United Arab Emirates national cricket team. After playing twelve first-class games for his native Colombo in 1988–89, Samarasekera emigrated to the United Arab Emirates. He made the national team for the 1994 Pepsi Austral-Asia Cup in Sharjah, where he played in his first two One Day Internationals, and also competed for the UAE in the 1994 ICC Trophy, where he was named the best bowler of the tournament, having taken 18 wickets. After playing in the 1995–96 Interface Cup, a List A competition also involving A teams from India, Pakistan and Sri Lanka, he was selected for the UAE in the 1996 World Cup. Samarasekera fared poorly in that competition and was not selected for the national team again.

He played 7 ODIs for the UAE and scored 124 runs at an average of 31.00; his highest score was 47. He also bagged 4 wickets for 236 runs with a best bowling of 1/17 and an economy rate of 4.82
