= Fahad Tariq =

Emirati cricketer (born 1990)

Personal information
- Full name: Fahad Tariq Raja
- Born: 13 January 1990 (age 36); Sharjah, United Arab Emirates
- Batting: Right-handed
- Bowling: Right-arm medium-fast

International information
- National side: United Arab Emirates
- T20I debut (cap 24): 3 February 2016 v Netherlands
- Last T20I: 3 March 2016 v India
- Source: ESPNcricinfo, 13 July 2020

Fahad Tariq (born 13 January 1990) is a cricketer who played for the United Arab Emirates national cricket team. He made his Twenty20 International debut against the Netherlands on 3 February 2016.
