= Farhan Ahmed =

Emirati cricketer (born 1988)

Personal information
- Born: 31 October 1988 (age 38); Bahawalpur, Pakistan
- Batting: Right-handed
- Bowling: Slow left-arm orthodox
- Role: Bowler

International information
- National side: United Arab Emirates
- T20I debut (cap 25): 3 February 2016 v Netherlands
- Last T20I: 21 February 2016 v Hong Kong

Career statistics
| Competition | T20I | FC | LA |
|---|---|---|---|
| Matches | 3 | 1 | 2 |
| Runs scored | 4 | 17 | 1 |
| Batting average | 4.00 | 8.50 | 0.50 |
| 100s/50s | 0/0 | 0/0 | 0/0 |
| Top score | 4 | 17 | 1 |
| Balls bowled | 54 | 240 | 81 |
| Wickets | 3 | 4 | 1 |
| Bowling average | 22.00 | 26.50 | 75.00 |
| 5 wickets in innings | 0 | 0 | 0 |
| 10 wickets in match | 0 | 0 | 0 |
| Best bowling | 2/28 | 4/78 | 1/40 |
| Catches/stumpings | 1/– | 1/– | 1/– |
- Source: ESPNcricinfo, 2 January 2024

Farhan Ahmed (born 31 October 1988) is a Pakistani-born cricketer who played for the United Arab Emirates national cricket team. He made his first-class debut for the United Arab Emirates against the Netherlands in the 2015–17 ICC Intercontinental Cup on 21 January 2016. He made his List A debut for the UAE against the Netherlands in the 2015–17 ICC World Cricket League Championship on 27 January 2016. He made his Twenty20 International debut against the Netherlands on 3 February 2016.
