= Saqlain Haider =

Emirati cricketer (born 1987)

Personal information
- Full name: Saqlain Haider
- Born: 10 August 1987 (age 39); Rawalpindi, Punjab, Pakistan
- Batting: Left-handed
- Role: Wicket-keeper

International information
- National side: United Arab Emirates (2014–present)
- ODI debut (cap 56): 2 December 2014 v Afghanistan
- Last ODI: 16 August 2016 v Scotland
- T20I debut (cap 28): 4 February 2016 v Scotland
- Last T20I: 26 February 2016 v Bangladesh

Career statistics
Competition	ODI	T20I	FC	LA
Matches	5	6	3	10
Runs scored	58	14	154	108
Batting average	14.50	3.50	51.33	15.42
100s/50s	0/0	0/0	1/0	0/0
Top score	28	7	102*	33*
Catches/stumpings	1/1	4/0	5/1	5/2
- Source: Cricinfo, 10 April 2017

Saqlain Haider (Urdu: سقلین حیدر) (born 10 August 1987) is a Pakistani-born cricketer who played for the United Arab Emirates national cricket team. He made his One Day International debut for the United Arab Emirates against Afghanistan on 2 December 2014. He made his Twenty20 International debut against Scotland on 4 February 2016.

In April 2017, he scored his maiden first-class century (102*) in round five of the 2015–17 ICC Intercontinental Cup against Papua New Guinea.
