= Zaheer Maqsood =

Emirati cricketer (born 1985)

Personal information
- Born: 5 May 1985 (age 41); Lahore, Pakistan
- Batting: Right-handed
- Bowling: Legbreak
- Role: Bowler

International information
- National side: United Arab Emirates
- Source: Cricinfo, 16 November 2015

Zaheer Maqsood (born 5 May 1985) is a Pakistani-born cricketer who played for the United Arab Emirates national cricket team. He made his One Day International debut for the UAE against Hong Kong in the 2015–17 ICC World Cricket League Championship on 16 November 2015. His Twenty20 International debut for the UAE was against Oman on 22 November 2015.
