= Mohammad Shahzad (Emirati cricketer) =

Emirati cricketer (born 1979)

Personal information
- Born: 15 August 1979 (age 47); Multan, Punjab, Pakistan
- Batting: Right-handed
- Bowling: Right arm medium-fast
- Role: All-rounder

International information
- National side: United Arab Emirates
- ODI debut (cap 52): 2 May 2014 v Afghanistan
- Last ODI: 16 August 2016 v Scotland
- ODI shirt no.: 12
- T20I debut (cap 16): 9 July 2015 v Scotland
- Last T20I: 3 March 2016 v India

Career statistics
Competition	ODI	T20I
Matches	6	15
Runs scored	190	252
Batting average	31.66	19.38
100s/50s	0/2	0/1
Top score	79	52
Balls bowled	233	206
Wickets	9	8
Bowling average	25.88	33.87
5 wickets in innings	0	0
10 wickets in match	0	0
Best bowling	4/26	2/10
Catches/stumpings	2/0	1/0
- Source: Cricinfo, 21 March 2019

Mohammad Shahzad (Urdu: محمد شہزاد; born 15 August 1979) is a Pakistani-born cricketer who played for the United Arab Emirates national cricket team. He made his One Day International (ODI) debut for the United Arab Emirates against Afghanistan in the 2014 ACC Premier League on 2 May 2014. He played the last of his six ODIs on 2 December 2014 also against Afghanistan. He made his Twenty20 International debut against Scotland in the 2015 ICC World Twenty20 Qualifier tournament on 9 July 2015.

He was reported for a suspected illegal bowling action by the ICC after the second ODI against Afghanistan on 30 November 2014 in Dubai, which was cleared later by the ICC on 25 May 2015.
