= Swapnil Patil =

Indian cricketer (born 1985)

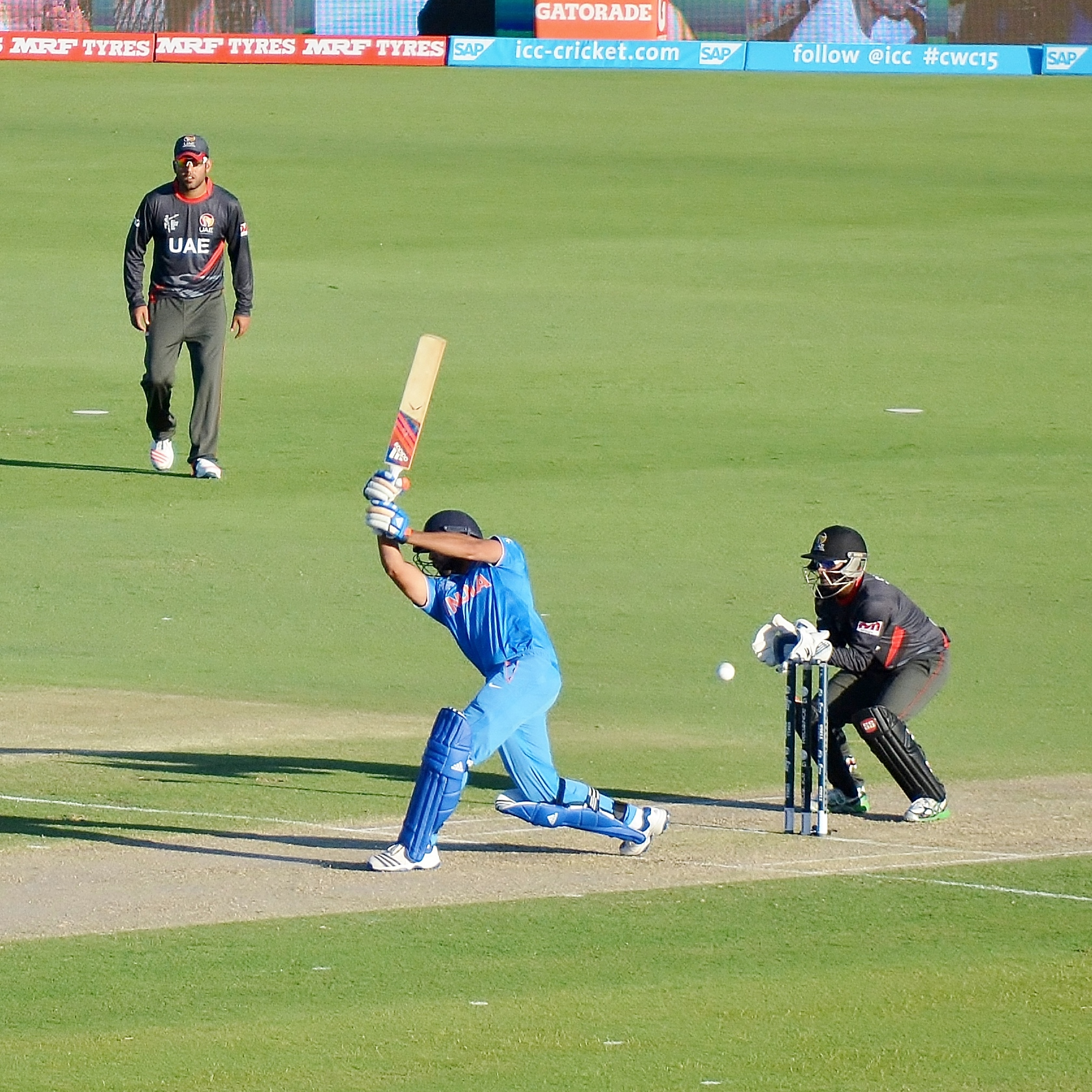
- Patil keeping wickets during the 2015 Cricket World Cup

Personal information
- Full name: Swapnil Prakash Patil
- Born: 15 April 1985 (age 41); Thane, Maharashtra, India
- Batting: Right-handed
- Role: Wicket-keeper batsman

International information
- National side: United Arab Emirates
- ODI debut (cap 44): 2 February 2014 v Scotland
- Last ODI: 18 November 2015 v Hong Kong
- T20I debut (cap 7): 17 March 2014 v Netherlands
- Last T20I: 21 March 2014 v Zimbabwe

Domestic team information
- Years: Team
- 2010–present: United Arab Emirates
- 2004/05–2005/06: Mumbai under-19
- 2015: Chittagong Vikings

Career statistics
Competition	ODI	FC	LA
Matches	10	7	30
Runs scored	241	532	862
Batting average	34.42	59.11	31.92
100s/50s	0/2	0/5	0/5
Top score	99*	94	99*
Catches/stumpings	3/1	9/3	31/8
- Source: Cricinfo

Swapnil Patil (born 15 April 1985) is an Indian-born cricketer who played for the United Arab Emirates national cricket team. Patil is a right-handed wicket-keeper batsman.

== Career ==
He played for the UAE in the 2014 Cricket World Cup Qualifier tournament, making his One Day International (ODI) debut in the final in New Zealand against Scotland at Bert Sutcliffe Oval in Lincoln.

Patil was among six players making their ODI debut. He impressed with a run-a-ball 99. He was dropped off the penultimate ball and needed two off the final delivery of the chase to reach a memorable century but could only edge to midwicket for a single. Patil became the second player to score 99 on ODI debut after Eoin Morgan. Patil also set the record for becoming the first cricketer to be unbeaten on 99 on ODI debut.

In March 2014, he made his T20I debut against Netherlands in Sylhet Stadium in ICC World Twenty20 in Bangladesh. He scored 23 runs off 28 balls before being dismissed by Tom Cooper.
