= 2004 ICC Intercontinental Cup =

First-class cricket tournament

- Dates: 22 April – 29 October
- Administrator: International Cricket Council
- Cricket format: First-Class cricket
- Tournament format(s): Round-robin and Final
- Champions: Scotland (1st title)
- Runners-up: Canada
- Participants: 12
- Matches: 15
- Most runs: (Scotland) Fraser Watts (413)
- Most wickets: (United Arab Emirates) Ali Asad (24)

The 2004 ICC Intercontinental Cup was the inaugural edition of the ICC Intercontinental Cup first class cricket tournament, an international cricket tournament contested by nations who have not been awarded Test status by the International Cricket Council. The tournament took place last from 25 March to 23 November 2004. The competition included 12 teams, divided by geographical region into four groups of three, followed by semi-finals and a final which were played at 2 venues in the United Arab Emirates, the Sharjah Cricket Stadium in Sharjah and Sheikh Zayed Cricket Stadium in Abu Dhabi.

== Points System ==
In order to encourage competitive play and avoid deadlocks, a point system including bonus points was used:

- Win: 14 points
- Tie: 7 points
- Draw or loss: 0 points
- Batting bonus points: 0.5 points for each 25 runs scored in the first 90 overs of each innings, to a maximum of 6 points per innings.
- Bowling bonus points: 0.5 points per wicket taken in each innings.

== Results ==
=== Africa Group ===
Team	P	W	L	D	Points
Kenya	2	1	0	1	45.5
Uganda	2	1	1	0	41
Namibia	2	0	1	1	32

The major surprise in the African group was the victory of Uganda over Namibia. Uganda's subsequent loss against Kenya paved the way for the Kenyans to the next round, despite a player's strike the day before their match against Namibia.

23–25 April
Scorecard

(H) Namibia	v	Uganda
165 (67.1 overs); Gerrie Snyman 46 (59); Joel Olwenyi 2/26 (11 overs)		274 (105 overs); Nandikishore Patel 74 (170); Louis Burger 2/19 (11 overs)
289 (98.1 overs); Danie Keulder 67 (131); Kenneth Kamyuka 5/83 (31.1 overs)		183/5 (44.1 overs); Benjamin Musoke 72 (112); Kola Burger 2/24 (13 overs)

Uganda won by 5 wickets
Wanderers Cricket Ground, Windhoek, Namibia
Umpires: Gerrie Pienar (SA) & Shaid Wadvalla (SA)
Player of the match: Frank Nsubuga (Uganda)

- Points: Uganda 32, Namibia 16
- Kola Burger, Louis Burger, Sarel Burger, Danie Keulder, Deon Kotze, Nicolaas Scholtz, Gerrie Snyman, Stefan Swanepoel, Johannes van der Merwe, Melt van Schoor, Riaan Walters (Nam); Akbar Baig, Kenneth Kamyuka, Junior Kwebiha, Keith Legesi, Benjamin Musoke, Michael Ndiko, Frank Nsubuga, Richard Okia, Joel Olwenyi, Nand Kishore and Lawrence Sematimba (Uga) all made their first-class debuts.

23–25 July
Scorecard

Uganda	v	Kenya (H)
152 (65.3 overs); Nandikishore Patel 42 (159); Thomas Odoyo 3/27 (12 overs)		307/6 d (89.3 overs); Ravi Shah 135 (244); Kenneth Kamyuka 4/83 (21.3 overs)
151 (57.2 overs); Joel Olwenyi 51 (72); Maurice Odumbe 3/17 (13 overs)

Kenya won by an innings and 4 runs
Gymkhana Club Ground, Nairobi, Kenya
Umpires: Earl Hendrikse (SA) & Muhammed Nanabhay (SA)
Player of the match: Ravi Shah (Kenya)

- Points: Kenya 30, Uganda 9
- Tendo Mbazzi (Uga) made his first-class debut.

1–3 October
Scorecard

Namibia	v	Kenya (H)
357/6 d (87.1 overs); Danie Keulder 90 (188); Ragheb Aga 3/86 (20.1 overs)		258 (81.2 overs); Lameck Onyango 67 (64); Sarel Burger 3/54 (25 overs)
202/5 d (44.4 overs); Stephan Swanepoel 74* (98); Hitesh Modi 2/41 (7.4 overs)		259/3 (80 overs); Ravi Shah 187 (268); Deon Kotze 1/35 (16 overs)

Match drawn
Aga Khan Sports Club Ground, Nairobi, Kenya
Umpires: Zed Ndamane (SA) & Craig Shoof (SA)
Player of the match: Ravi Shah (Kenya)

- Points: Namibia 16.5, Kenya 15.5
- Amit Bhudia, Rajesh Bhudia, Kalpesh Patel (Ken); Jan-Berrie Burger, Hugo Ludik and Niel Rossouw (Nam) all made their first-class debuts.

=== Americas Group ===
Team	P	W	L	D	Points
Canada	2	1	0	1	50
United States	2	1	1	0	47
Bermuda	2	0	1	1	29

28–30 May
Scorecard

Canada	v	United States (H)
221 (73.5 overs); John Davison 84 (113); Nasir Javed 5/78 (23.5 overs)		136 (40.4 overs); Aijaz Ali 36 (41); John Davison 8/61 (14.4 overs)
145 (72.5 overs); Sunil Dhaniram 65* (148); Tony Reid 2/10 (6 overs)		126 (44.2 overs); Mark Johnson 41 (70); John Davison 9/76 (21.2 overs)

Canada won by 104 runs
Brian Piccolo Park, Fort Lauderdale, USA
Umpires: Billy Doctrove (WI) & Norman Malcolm (WI)

- Points: Canada 30.5, USA 15
- Ashish Bagai, Desmond Chumney, Haninder Dhillon, Ashish Patel, Easan Sinnathamby, Zubin Surkari (Canada); Aijaz Ali, Zamin Amin, Donovan Blake, Howard Johnson, Mark Johnson, Steve Massiah, Nasir Javed and Tony Reid (United States of America) all made their first-class debuts.

13–15 July
Scorecard

United States	v	Bermuda (H)
297/9 d (90 overs); Steve Massiah 104 (234); Dennis Archer 3/30 (15 overs)		201/8 d (86.5 overs); Clay Smith 62 (142); Nasir Javed 3/62 (20 overs)
183 (46.2 overs); Mark Johnson 46 (39); Dwayne Leverock 7/57 (16.2 overs)		166 (68.3 overs); Clay Smith 65 (161); Howard Johnson 5/38 (17 overs)

USA won by 114 runs
National Stadium, Hamilton, Bermuda
Umpires: Hubert Smythe (Cay) & Courtney Young (Cay)
Player of the match: Steve Massiah

- Points: USA 32, Bermuda 16.5
- Dennis Archer, Glenn Blakeney, Delyone Borden, Mackie Crane, David Gibbs, Dwayne Leverock, Saleem Mukuddem, Steven Outerbridge, Irving Romaine, Clay Smith, Wendell White (Bermuda); Jignesh Desai and Naseer Islam (United States of America) all made their first-class debuts.

13–15 August
Scorecard

(H) Canada	v	Bermuda
250/9 d (88.4 overs); Ashish Bagai 66 (177); Saleem Mukuddem 3/28 (18 overs)		107 (51 overs); Irving Romaine 40 (94); John Davison 5/19 (14 overs)
250/4 d (51.1 overs); Haninder Dhillon 102 (138); Ryan Steede 2/30 (7 overs)		221/9 (87 overs); Clay Smith 63 (151); Kevin Sandher 6/68 (31 overs)

Match drawn
Sunnybrook Park, Toronto, Ontario, Canada
Umpires: Hubert Smythe (Cay) & Courtney Young (Cay)
Player of the match: Haninder Dhillon

- Points: Canada 19.5, Bermuda 12.5
- Jekon Edness, Kevin Hurdle, Oliver Pitcher, Ryan Steede, Reginald Tucker (Bermuda); Umar Bhatti, Austin Codrington, Don Maxwell and Kevin Sandher (Canada) all made their first-class debuts.

=== Asia Group ===
Team	P	W	L	D	Points
United Arab Emirates	2	1	0	1	50.5
Nepal	2	1	0	1	42
Malaysia	2	0	2	0	23

25–27 March
Scorecard

(H) United Arab Emirates	v	Nepal
293/9 d (82.1 overs); Arshad Ali 143 (216); Binod Das 5/61 (23 overs)		213 (76 overs); Raju Khadka 67 (94); Ali Asad 9/74 (27 overs)
253/6 d (83 overs); Fahad Usman 102* (163); Raju Khadka 2/17 (11 overs)		141/5 (75 overs); Sharad Vesawkar 50* (172); Ali Asad 4/52 (20 overs)

Match drawn
Sharjah Cricket Association Stadium, Sharjah, UAE
Umpires: Shakeel Khan (PAK) & Gamini Silva (SL)
Player of the match: Ali Asad (UAE)

- Points: UAE 18, Nepal 14
- Mahaboob Alam, Raju Basnyat, Dipendra Chaudhary, Binod Das, Shakti Gauchan, Manoj Katuwal, Raju Khadka, Paresh Lohani, Raj Pradhan, Sanjam Regmi, Sharad Vesawkar (Nepal); Abdullah Hanif, Ali Asad, Arshad Ali, Asim Saeed, Ausaf Ali, Khurram Khan, Mohammad Nadeem, Mohammad Tauqir, Naeemuddin Aslam and Rizwan Latif (United Arab Emirates) all made their first-class debuts.

23–25 April
Scorecard

Malaysia	v	Nepal (H)
132 (54.5 overs); Rohan Selvaratnam 56 (113); Sanjam Regmi 3/25 (18 overs)		198 (84.1 overs); Shakti Gauchan 69 (231); Suresh Navaratnam 5/61 (20 overs)
99 (51.2 overs); Matthew William 27 (35); Mehboob Alam 3/25 (12 overs)		34/1 (7.1 overs); Paresh Lohani 16* (25); Suresh Navaratnam 1/16 (4 overs)

Nepal won by 9 wickets
Tribhuvan University International Cricket Ground, Kirtipur, Nepal
Umpires: Ranmore Martinesz (SL) & Zameer Haider (PAK)
Player of the match: Mehboob Alam (Nepal) & Shakti Gauchan (Nepal)

- Points: Nepal 27.5, Malaysia 9.5
- Suriaprakash Ganesan, Rakesh Madhavan, Mohammad Shukri, Marimuthu Muniandy, Krishnamurthi Muniandy, Suresh Navaratnam, Suresh Sakadivan, Rohan Selvaratnam, Rohan Suppiah, Matthew William (Malaysia); Bikash Dali and Paras Khadka (Nepal) all made their first-class debuts.

17–19 September
Scorecard

United Arab Emirates	v	Malaysia (H)
231/9 d (57 overs); Khurram Khan 66 (70); Mohammad Shukri 3/32 (6 overs)		173 (72.5 overs); Rohan Selvaratnam 53 (108); Mohammad Tauqir 4/34 (13 overs)
211/7 d (48 overs); Arshad Ali 78 (99); Sarath Jayawardene 3/33 (10 overs)		145 (58.1 overs); Rakesh Madhavan 60 (128); Mohammad Tauqir 6/17 (17.1 overs)

UAE won by 124 runs
Selangor Turf Club, Kuala Lumpur, Malaysia
Umpires: Shishir Chowdhury (BAN) & Manzur Rahman (BAN)
Player of the match: Mohammad Tauqir (UAE)

- Points: UAE 32.5, Malaysia 13.5
- Eszrafiq Aziz, Ariffin Ramly, Shankar Retinam, Manrick Singh (Malaysia); Ahmed Nadeem, Kaif Ghaury, Mohammad Taskeen, Ramveer Rai, Sameer Zia and Syed Maqsood (United Arab Emirates) all made their first-class debuts.

=== Europe Group ===
Team	P	W	L	D	Points
Scotland	2	1	0	1	48.5
Ireland	2	1	1	0	43
Netherlands	2	0	1	1	27

11 June
Scorecard

(H) Scotland	v	Netherlands
314/7 d (87 overs); Craig Wright 88 (129); Edgar Schiferli 3/73 (22 overs)		257 (75.4 overs); Bas Zuiderent 78 (140); Ryan Watson 5/74 (21.4 overs)
250/8 d (66 overs); Fraser Watts 79 (132); Sebastiaan Gokke 4/77 (21 overs)		207/3 (76 overs); Bas Zuiderent 68* (139); Bruce Patterson 2/17 (6 overs)

Match drawn
Mannofield Park, Aberdeen, Scotland
Umpires: Trevor Henry (Ire) & Richard Illingworth (Eng)

- Points: Scotland 17.5, Netherlands 16.5
- Adeel Raja, Tom de Grooth, Jacob-Jan Esmeijer, Sebastiaan Gokke, Henk-Jan Mol, Edgar Schiferli, Chris Smith, Jeroen Smits, Daan van Bunge, Luuk van Troost (Netherlands); Majid Haq, Paul Hoffmann, Steven Knox and Ryan Watson (Scotland) all made their first-class debuts.

13 July
Scorecard

(H) Netherlands	v	Ireland
200 (80.5 overs)		388/8 d (87 overs)
141 (56.1 overs)

Ireland won by an innings and 47 runs
Sportpark Het Schootsveld, Deventer, the Netherlands

- Points: Ireland 30, Netherlands 10.5
- Jeremy Bray, Dom Joyce, John Mooney, Stephen Ogilby, Greg Thompson, Andrew White (Ireland); Feiko Kloppenburg and Maurits van Nierop (Netherlands) all made their first-class debuts.

6 August
Scorecard

(H) Ireland	v	Scotland
193 (59.4 overs)		167 (59.1 overs)
178 (51.4 overs)		206/2 (53.3 overs)

Scotland won by 8 wickets
Clontarf Cricket Club Ground, Dublin, Ireland

- Points: Scotland 31, Ireland 13
- Eoin Morgan (Ireland); Dewald Nel and Simon Smith (Scotland) all made their first-class debuts.

== Final round ==
=== Semi-finals ===
The semifinals was played in UAE, but were delayed because the death of Zayed bin Sultan Al Nahyan. Originally were scheduled to start on 16 November and were postponed one day. Canada and Scotland advanced to the final, both in draws by points.

17–19 November
Scorecard

Scotland	v	Kenya
300/5 d (88.3 overs); Fraser Watts 146 (222); Lameck Onyango 1/38 (14 overs)		95 (31.5 overs); Ravi Shah 32 (63); Paul Hoffmann 5/5 (5.5 overs)
401/7 d (120 overs); Kyle Coetzer 133 (219); Lameck Onyango 2/17 (8 overs)		163/4 (52 overs); Amit Bhudia 79 (148); Ryan Watson 2/45 (16 overs)

Match drawn
Sheikh Zayed Stadium, Abu Dhabi, UAE
Umpires: Saleem Badar (Pak) & Gamini Silva (SL)
Player of the match: Paul Hoffmann (Scotland)

- Points: Scotland 19, Kenya 10.5
- Tanmay Mishra (Kenya) made his first-class debut.

17–19 November
Scorecard

Canada	v	United Arab Emirates
337/6 d (81 overs); Zubin Surkari 139 (218); Ali Asad 4/59 (20 overs)		254/8 d (85.4 overs); Syed Maqsood 100* (154); Umar Bhatti 3/44 (15.4 overs)
253/8 d (81.1 overs); Ian Billcliff 63 (154); Zahid Shah 4/53 (15.1)		194/9 (55 overs); Kashif Khan 56 (71); Umar Bhatti 5/43 (13 overs)

Match drawn
Sharjah Cricket Association Stadium, Sharjah, UAE
Umpires: Siddiq Khan (Pak) & Tyron Wijewardene (SL)
Player of the match: Zubin Surkari (Canada)

- Points: Canada 19.5, UAE 15.5
- Ashif Mulla, Jason Patraj, Sanjayan Thuraisingam (Canada); Mohammad Atif and Zahid Shah (United Arab Emirates) all made their first-class debuts.

=== Final ===
The final started at 21 November. Canada won the toss and elected to bat. However Canada had a poor start, losing Ashif Mulla to the last ball of the first over of the match, bowled by John Blain. In the same day, Scotland took advantage of 80 runs. In the second day Scotland declared with 177 runs ahead. Canada only scored 93 runs for the easy victory of Scotland.

21–22 November
Scorecard

Canada	v	Scotland
110 (41.1 overs); Ian Billcliff 31 (125); Ryan Watson 3/1 (4.1 overs)		287/8 d (88.1 overs); Gavin Hamilton 115 (242); Umar Bhatti 4/49 (17.4 overs)
93 (29.5 overs); Umar Bhatti 41 (93); Asim Butt 4/10 (8 overs)

Scotland won by an innings and 84 runs
Sharjah Cricket Association Stadium
Umpires: Gamini Silva (SL) & Tyron Wijewardene (SL)
Player of the match: John Blain (Scotland)

== Stats ==
=== Most runs ===
Player	Matches	Runs	Average	HS
(Scotland) Fraser Watts	4	413	68.83	146
(Kenya) Ravi Shah	3	366	122.00	187*
(United Arab Emirates) Arshad Ali	3	338	58.07	143
(Scotland) Ryan Watson	4	251	41.83	57
(Ireland) Andrew White	2	230	115.00	152*

=== Most wickets ===
Player	Matches	Wickets	Average	BBI
(United Arab Emirates) Ali Asad	3	24	15.95	9/74
(Canada) John Davison	2	23	9.13	9/76
(Scotland) Asim Butt	3	16	10.62	5/47
(Canada) Umar Bhatti	3	13	14.00	5/43
(Bermuda) Dwayne Leverock	2	13	20.23	7/57
