= International cricket in 2003–04 =

Cricket season

The 2003–04 international cricket season lasted from September 2003 to March 2004.

== Season overview ==
International tours
Start date	Home team	Away team	Results [Matches]	
Start date	Home team	Away team	Test	ODI
3 October 2003	Pakistan	South Africa	1–0 [2]	2–3 [5]
8 October 2003	India	New Zealand	0–0 [2]	—
9 October 2003	Australia	Zimbabwe	2–0 [2]	—
21 October 2003	Bangladesh	England	0–2 [2]	0–3 [3]
4 November 2003	Zimbabwe	West Indies	0–1 [2]	2–3 [5]
18 November 2003	Sri Lanka	England	1–0 [3]	1–0 [3]
29 November 2003	Pakistan	New Zealand	—	5–0 [5]
4 December 2003	Australia	India	1–1 [4]	—
12 December 2003	South Africa	West Indies	3–0 [4]	3–1 [5]
19 December 2003	New Zealand	Pakistan	0–1 [2]	4–1 [5]
13 February 2004	New Zealand	South Africa	1–1 [3]	5–1 [6]
19 February 2004	Zimbabwe	Bangladesh	1–0 [2]	2–1 [5]
20 February 2004	Sri Lanka	Australia	0–3 [3]	2–3 [5]
11 March 2004	West Indies	England	0–3 [4]	2–2 [7]
13 March 2004	Pakistan	India	1–2 [3]	2–3 [5]
International tournaments
Dates	Tournament		Winners	
23 October 2003	(India) TVS Cup		Australia	
9 January 2004	(Australia) VB Series		Australia	
Minor international tournaments
Dates	Tournament		Winners	
23 March 2004	(Panama) Americas Affiliates Championship 2003–04		Bahamas	
25 March 2004	2004 ICC Intercontinental Cup		Scotland	

== Pre-season rankings ==
The following are the rankings at the start of the season.

ICC Test Championship Table in August 2003			ICC ODI Championship Table in August 2003		
Rank	Team	Rating	Rank	Team	Rating
1	Australia	129	1	Australia	134
2	South Africa	119	2	South Africa	118
3	New Zealand	106	3	England	107
4	England	101	4	West Indies	106
5	India	94	5	New Zealand	106
6	Sri Lanka	91	6	Sri Lanka	105
7	Pakistan	90	7	Pakistan	105
8	West Indies	83	8	India	104
9	Zimbabwe	58	9	Zimbabwe	63
10	Bangladesh	2	10	Kenya	30
			11	Bangladesh	3

== October ==
=== South Africa in Pakistan ===
No.	Date	Home captain	Away captain	Venue	Result
ODI series
ODI 2046	3 October	Inzamam-ul-Haq	Graeme Smith	Gaddafi Stadium, Lahore	Pakistan by 8 runs
ODI 2047	5 October	Inzamam-ul-Haq	Graeme Smith	Gaddafi Stadium, Lahore	Pakistan by 42 runs
ODI 2048	7 October	Yousuf Youhana	Graeme Smith	Iqbal Stadium, Faisalabad	South Africa by 13 runs (D/L)
ODI 2049	10 October	Yousuf Youhana	Graeme Smith	Rawalpindi Cricket Stadium, Rawalpindi	South Africa by 6 wickets
ODI 2050	12 October	Inzamam-ul-Haq	Mark Boucher	Rawalpindi Cricket Stadium, Rawalpindi	South Africa by 7 wickets
Test series
Test 1664	17–21 October	Yousuf Youhana	Graeme Smith	Gaddafi Stadium, Lahore	Pakistan by 8 wickets
Test 1666	24–28 October	Inzamam-ul-Haq	Graeme Smith	Iqbal Stadium, Faisalabad	Match Drawn

=== New Zealand in India ===
No.	Date	Home captain	Away captain	Venue	Result
Test series
Test 1660	8–12 October	Sourav Ganguly	Stephen Fleming	Sardar Patel Stadium, Ahmedabad	Match Drawn
Test 1662	16–20 October	Rahul Dravid	Stephen Fleming	Punjab Cricket Association Stadium, Mohali	Match Drawn

=== Zimbabwe in Australia ===
No.	Date	Home captain	Away captain	Venue	Result
Test series
Test 1661	9–13 October	Steve Waugh	Heath Streak	WACA Ground, Perth	Australia by an innings and 175 runs
Test 1663	17–20 October	Steve Waugh	Heath Streak	Sydney Cricket Ground, Sydney	Australia by 9 wickets

=== England in Bangladesh ===
No.	Date	Home captain	Away captain	Venue	Result
Test series
Test 1665	21–25 October	Khaled Mahmud	Michael Vaughan	Bangabandhu National Stadium, Dhaka	England by 7 wickets
Test 1667	29 October–1 November	Khaled Mahmud	Michael Vaughan	M. A. Aziz Stadium, Chittagong	England by 329 runs
ODI series
ODI 2057	7 November	Khaled Mahmud	Michael Vaughan	M. A. Aziz Stadium, Chittagong	England by 7 wickets
ODI 2059	10 November	Khaled Mahmud	Michael Vaughan	Bangabandhu National Stadium, Dhaka	England by 7 wickets
ODI 2060	12 November	Khaled Mahmud	Michael Vaughan	Bangabandhu National Stadium, Dhaka	England by 7 wickets

=== TVS Cup (India, Australia, New Zealand in India) ===
Pos	Team	Pld	W	L	NR	Pts	NRR
1	Australia	6	5	1	0	28	+1.113
2	India	6	2	3	1	16	+0.110
3	New Zealand	6	1	4	1	10	–1.457

No.	Date	Team 1	Captain 1	Team 2	Captain 2	Venue	Result
Group stage
ODI 2051	23 October	India	Rahul Dravid	New Zealand	Stephen Fleming	M.A. Chidambaram Stadium, Chennai	No Result
ODI 2052	26 October	India	Rahul Dravid	Australia	Ricky Ponting	Captain Roop Singh Stadium, Gwalior	India by 37 runs
ODI 2053	29 October	Australia	Ricky Ponting	New Zealand	Stephen Fleming	Nahar Singh Stadium, Faridabad	Australia by 8 wickets
ODI 2054	1 November	India	Rahul Dravid	Australia	Ricky Ponting	Wankhede Stadium, Mumbai	Australia by 77 runs
ODI 2055	3 November	Australia	Ricky Ponting	New Zealand	Stephen Fleming	Nehru Stadium, Pune	Australia by 2 wickets
ODI 2056	6 November	India	Rahul Dravid	New Zealand	Stephen Fleming	Barabati Stadium, Cuttack	New Zealand by 4 wickets
ODI 2058	9 November	Australia	Ricky Ponting	New Zealand	Stephen Fleming	Nehru Stadium, Guwahati	Australia by 44 runs
ODI 2061	12 November	India	Sourav Ganguly	Australia	Ricky Ponting	M. Chinnaswamy Stadium, Bangalore	Australia by 61 runs
ODI 2062	15 November	India	Sourav Ganguly	New Zealand	Chris Cairns	Lal Bahadur Shastri Stadium, Hyderabad	India by 145 runs
Final
ODI 2064	18 November	India	Rahul Dravid	Australia	Ricky Ponting	Eden Gardens, Kolkata	Australia by 37 runs

== November ==
=== West Indies in Zimbabwe ===
No.	Date	Home captain	Away captain	Venue	Result
Test series
Test 1668	4–8 November	Heath Streak	Brian Lara	Harare Sports Club, Harare	Match Drawn
Test 1669	12–16 November	Heath Streak	Brian Lara	Queens Sports Club, Bulawayo	West Indies by 128 runs
ODI series
ODI 2065	22 November	Heath Streak	Brian Lara	Queens Sports Club, Bulawayo	West Indies by 51 runs (D/L)
ODI 2066	23 November	Heath Streak	Brian Lara	Queens Sports Club, Bulawayo	Zimbabwe by 6 wickets
ODI 2067	26 November	Heath Streak	Brian Lara	Harare Sports Club, Harare	Zimbabwe by 21 runs
ODI 2069	29 November	Heath Streak	Brian Lara	Harare Sports Club, Harare	West Indies by 72 runs (D/L)
ODI 2070	30 November	Heath Streak	Brian Lara	Harare Sports Club, Harare	West Indies by 8 wickets

=== England in Sri Lanka ===
No.	Date	Home captain	Away captain	Venue	Result
ODI series
ODI 2063	18 November	Marvan Atapattu	Michael Vaughan	Rangiri Dambulla International Stadium, Dambulla	Sri Lanka by 10 wickets
ODI 2064a	21 November	Marvan Atapattu	Michael Vaughan	R. Premadasa Stadium, Colombo	Match abandoned
ODI 2066a	23 November	Marvan Atapattu	Michael Vaughan	R. Premadasa Stadium, Colombo	Match abandoned
Test series
Test 1670	2–6 December	Hashan Tillakaratne	Michael Vaughan	Galle International Stadium, Galle	Match drawn
Test 1672	10–14 December	Hashan Tillakaratne	Michael Vaughan	Asgiriya Stadium, Kandy	Match drawn
Test 1675	18–21 December	Hashan Tillakaratne	Michael Vaughan	Sinhalese Sports Club Ground, Colombo	Sri Lanka by an innings and 215 runs

=== New Zealand in Pakistan ===
No.	Date	Home captain	Away captain	Venue	Result
ODI series
ODI 2068	29 November	Inzamam-ul-Haq	Chris Cairns	Gaddafi Stadium, Lahore	Pakistan by 3 wickets
ODI 2071	1 December	Yousuf Youhana	Chris Cairns	Gaddafi Stadium, Lahore	Pakistan by 124 runs
ODI 2072	3 December	Inzamam-ul-Haq	Chris Cairns	Iqbal Stadium, Faisalabad	Pakistan by 51 runs
ODI 2073	5 December	Inzamam-ul-Haq	Chris Cairns	Rawalpindi Cricket Stadium, Rawalpindi	Pakistan by 7 wickets
ODI 2074	7 December	Inzamam-ul-Haq	Chris Cairns	Rawalpindi Cricket Stadium, Rawalpindi	Pakistan by 49 runs

== December ==
=== India in Australia ===
No.	Date	Home captain	Away captain	Venue	Result
Test series
Test 1671	4–8 December	Steve Waugh	Sourav Ganguly	The Gabba, Brisbane	Match drawn
Test 1673	12–16 December	Steve Waugh	Sourav Ganguly	Adelaide Oval, Adelaide	India by 4 wickets
Test 1678	26–30 December	Steve Waugh	Sourav Ganguly	Melbourne Cricket Ground, Melbourne	Australia by 9 wickets
Test 1680	2–6 January	Steve Waugh	Sourav Ganguly	Sydney Cricket Ground, Sydney	Match drawn

=== West Indies in South Africa ===
No.	Date	Home captain	Away captain	Venue	Result
Test series
Test 1674	12–16 December	Graeme Smith	Brian Lara	New Wanderers Stadium, Johannesburg	South Africa by 189 runs
Test 1679	26–29 December	Graeme Smith	Brian Lara	Kingsmead, Durban	South Africa by an innings and 65 runs
Test 1681	2–6 January	Graeme Smith	Brian Lara	Newlands, Cape Town	Match drawn
Test 1682	16–20 January	Graeme Smith	Brian Lara	SuperSport Park, Centurion	South Africa by 10 wickets

=== Pakistan in New Zealand ===
No.	Date	Home captain	Away captain	Venue	Result
Test series
Test 1676	19–23 December	Stephen Fleming	Inzamam-ul-Haq	Seddon Park, Hamilton	Match drawn
Test 1677	26–30 December	Stephen Fleming	Inzamam-ul-Haq	Basin Reserve, Wellington	Pakistan by 7 wickets

== January ==
=== VB Series (AUS, IND, ZIM in AUS) ===
Pos	Team	Pld	W	L	NR	BP	Pts	NRR
1	Australia	8	6	1	1	7	37	+1.100
2	India	8	5	3	0	4	29	+0.282
3	Zimbabwe	8	0	7	1	3	6	–1.326

No.	Date	Team 1	Captain 1	Team 2	Captain 2	Venue	Result
Group stage
ODI 2077	9 January	Australia	Ricky Ponting	India	Sourav Ganguly	Melbourne Cricket Ground, Melbourne	Australia by 18 runs
ODI 2079	11 January	Australia	Ricky Ponting	Zimbabwe	Heath Streak	Sydney Cricket Ground, Sydney	Australia by 99 runs
ODI 2080	14 January	India	Sourav Ganguly	Zimbabwe	Heath Streak	Bellerive Oval, Hobart	India by 7 wickets
ODI 2082	16 January	Australia	Ricky Ponting	Zimbabwe	Heath Streak	Bellerive Oval, Hobart	Australia by 148 runs
ODI 2084	18 January	Australia	Ricky Ponting	India	Sourav Ganguly	The Gabba, Brisbane	India by 19 runs
ODI 2085	20 January	India	Sourav Ganguly	Zimbabwe	Heath Streak	The Gabba, Brisbane	India by 24 runs
ODI 2086	22 January	Australia	Ricky Ponting	India	Sourav Ganguly	Sydney Cricket Ground, Sydney	Australia by 2 wickets
ODI 2087	24 January	India	Sourav Ganguly	Zimbabwe	Heath Streak	Adelaide Oval, Adelaide	India by 3 runs
ODI 2089	26 January	Australia	Ricky Ponting	Zimbabwe	Heath Streak	Adelaide Oval, Adelaide	Australia by 13 runs
ODI 2091	29 January	Australia	Ricky Ponting	Zimbabwe	Heath Streak	Melbourne Cricket Ground, Melbourne	No result
ODI 2093	1 February	Australia	Adam Gilchrist	India	Sourav Ganguly	WACA Ground, Perth	Australia by 5 wickets
ODI 2095	3 February	India	Rahul Dravid	Zimbabwe	Heath Streak	WACA Ground, Perth	India by 4 wickets
Finals
ODI 2097	6 February	Australia	Ricky Ponting	India	Sourav Ganguly	Melbourne Cricket Ground, Melbourne	Australia by 7 wickets
ODI 2098	8 February	Australia	Ricky Ponting	India	Sourav Ganguly	Sydney Cricket Ground, Sydney	Australia by 208 runs

=== West Indies in South Africa ===
No.	Date	Home captain	Away captain	Venue	Result
ODI series
ODI 2088	25 January	Graeme Smith	Brian Lara	Newlands, Cape Town	South Africa by 209 runs
ODI 2090	28 January	Graeme Smith	Brian Lara	St. George's Park, Port Elizabeth	South Africa by 16 runs
ODI 2092	30 January	Graeme Smith	Brian Lara	Kingsmead, Durban	No result
ODI 2094	1 February	Graeme Smith	Brian Lara	SuperSport Park, Centurion	West Indies by 7 wickets
ODI 2096	4 February	Graeme Smith	Brian Lara	New Wanderers Stadium, Johannesburg	South Africa by 4 wickets

== February ==
=== Bangladesh in Zimbabwe ===
No.	Date	Home captain	Away captain	Venue	Result
Test series
Test 1683	19–23 February	Heath Streak	Habibul Bashar	Harare Sports Club, Harare	Zimbabwe by 183 runs
Test 1684	26–29 February	Heath Streak	Habibul Bashar	Queens Sports Club, Bulawayo	Match drawn
ODI series
ODI 2109a	6 March	Heath Streak	Habibul Bashar	Queens Sports Club, Bulawayo	Match abandoned
ODI 2109b	7 March	Heath Streak	Habibul Bashar	Queens Sports Club, Bulawayo	Match abandoned
ODI 2110	10 March	Heath Streak	Habibul Bashar	Harare Sports Club, Harare	Bangladesh by 8 runs
ODI 2111	12 March	Heath Streak	Habibul Bashar	Harare Sports Club, Harare	Zimbabwe by 14 runs
ODI 2113	14 March	Heath Streak	Habibul Bashar	Harare Sports Club, Harare	Zimbabwe by 3 wickets

=== South Africa in New Zealand ===
The two abandoned ODI matches at Dunedin and Auckland were played the day after at the same venue. The ODI series was still revised to a six-game series

No.	Date	Home captain	Away captain	Venue	Result
ODI series
ODI 2099	13 February	Stephen Fleming	Graeme Smith	Eden Park, Auckland	South Africa by 5 wickets
ODI 2100	17 February	Stephen Fleming	Graeme Smith	Jade Stadium, Christchurch	New Zealand by 5 wickets
ODI 2101	20 February	Stephen Fleming	Graeme Smith	Westpac Stadium, Wellington	New Zealand by 5 runs
ODI 2103a	24 February	Stephen Fleming	Graeme Smith	Carisbrook, Dunedin	Match abandoned
ODI 2104	25 February	Stephen Fleming	Graeme Smith	Carisbrook, Dunedin	New Zealand by 6 wickets
ODI 2106a	28 February	Stephen Fleming	Graeme Smith	Eden Park, Auckland	Match abandoned
ODI 2107	29 February	Stephen Fleming	Graeme Smith	Eden Park, Auckland	New Zealand by 2 runs (D/L)
ODI 2109	2 March	Stephen Fleming	Graeme Smith	McLean Park, Napier	New Zealand by 5 wickets
Test series
Test 1686	10–14 March	Stephen Fleming	Graeme Smith	Westpac Park, Hamilton	Match drawn
Test 1689	18–22 March	Stephen Fleming	Graeme Smith	Eden Park, Auckland	New Zealand by 9 wickets
Test 1692	26–30 March	Stephen Fleming	Graeme Smith	Basin Reserve, Wellington	South Africa by 6 wickets

=== Australia in Sri Lanka ===
No.	Date	Home captain	Away captain	Venue	Result
ODI series
ODI 2102	20 February	Marvan Atapattu	Ricky Ponting	Rangiri Dambulla International Stadium, Dambulla	Australia by 84 runs
ODI 2103	22 February	Marvan Atapattu	Ricky Ponting	Rangiri Dambulla International Stadium, Dambulla	Sri Lanka by 1 run
ODI 2105	25 February	Marvan Atapattu	Ricky Ponting	R. Premadasa Stadium, Colombo	Australia by 5 wickets
ODI 2106	27 February	Marvan Atapattu	Ricky Ponting	R. Premadasa Stadium, Colombo	Australia by 40 runs
ODI 2108	29 February	Marvan Atapattu	Adam Gilchrist	Sinhalese Sports Club Ground, Colombo	Sri Lanka by 3 wickets
Test series
Test 1685	8–12 March	Hashan Tillakaratne	Ricky Ponting	Galle International Stadium, Galle	Australia by 197 runs
Test 1688	16–20 March	Hashan Tillakaratne	Ricky Ponting	Asgiriya Stadium, Kandy	Australia by 27 runs
Test 1691	24–28 March	Hashan Tillakaratne	Ricky Ponting	Sinhalese Sports Club Ground, Colombo	Australia by 121 runs

== March ==
=== England in West Indies ===
No.	Date	Home captain	Away captain	Venue	Result
Test series
Test 1687	11–14 March	Brian Lara	Michael Vaughan	Sabina Park, Kingston, Jamaica	England by 10 wickets
Test 1690	19–23 March	Brian Lara	Michael Vaughan	Queen's Park Oval, Port of Spain, Trinidad	England by 7 wickets
Test 1694	1–3 April	Brian Lara	Michael Vaughan	Kensington Oval, Bridgetown, Barbados	England by 8 wickets
Test 1696	10–14 April	Brian Lara	Michael Vaughan	Antigua Recreation Ground, St John's, Antigua	Match drawn
ODI series
ODI 2118	18 April	Ramnaresh Sarwan	Michael Vaughan	Bourda, Georgetown, Guyana	England by 2 wickets
ODI 2121	24 April	Brian Lara	Michael Vaughan	Queen's Park Oval, Port of Spain, Trinidad	No result
ODI 2122a	25 April	Brian Lara	Michael Vaughan	Queen's Park Oval, Port of Spain, Trinidad	Match abandoned
ODI 2123a	28 April	Brian Lara	Michael Vaughan	National Cricket Stadium, St George's, Grenada	Match abandoned
ODI 2125	1 May	Brian Lara	Michael Vaughan	Beausejour Stadium, Gros Islet, St Lucia	West Indies by 5 wickets
ODI 2126	2 May	Brian Lara	Michael Vaughan	Beausejour Stadium, Gros Islet, St Lucia	West Indies by 4 wickets
ODI 2127	5 May	Brian Lara	Michael Vaughan	Kensington Oval, Bridgetown, Barbados	England by 5 wickets

=== India in Pakistan ===
No.	Date	Home captain	Away captain	Venue	Result
ODI series
ODI 2112	13 March	Inzamam-ul-Haq	Sourav Ganguly	National Stadium, Karachi	India by 5 runs
ODI 2114	16 March	Inzamam-ul-Haq	Sourav Ganguly	Rawalpindi Cricket Stadium, Rawalpindi	Pakistan by 12 runs
ODI 2115	19 March	Inzamam-ul-Haq	Sourav Ganguly	Arbab Niaz Stadium, Peshawar	Pakistan by 4 wickets
ODI 2116	21 March	Inzamam-ul-Haq	Sourav Ganguly	Gaddafi Stadium, Lahore	India by 5 wickets
ODI 2117	24 March	Inzamam-ul-Haq	Sourav Ganguly	Gaddafi Stadium, Lahore	India by 40 runs
Test series
Test 1693	28 March–1 April	Inzamam-ul-Haq	Rahul Dravid	Multan Cricket Stadium, Multan	India by an innings and 52 runs
Test 1695	5–8 April	Inzamam-ul-Haq	Rahul Dravid	Gaddafi Stadium, Lahore	Pakistan by 9 wickets
Test 1697	13–16 April	Inzamam-ul-Haq	Sourav Ganguly	Rawalpindi Cricket Stadium, Rawalpindi	India by an innings and 131 runs

=== 2003–04 Americas Affiliates Championship ===
No.	Date	Team 1	Captain 1	Team 2	Captain 2	Venue	Result
Match 1	23 March	Bahamas	NA	Turks and Caicos Islands	NA	Howard 2 Ground, Panama City	Bahamas by 8 wickets
Match 2	23 March	Belize	NA	Suriname	NA	Howard 1 Ground, Panama City	Belize by 117 runs
Match 3	24 March	Belize	NA	Turks and Caicos Islands	NA	Howard 2 Ground, Panama City	Belize by 207 runs
Match 4	24 March	Panama	NA	Bahamas	NA	Howard 1 Ground, Panama City	Bahamas by 6 wickets
Match 5	25 March	Panama	NA	Belize	NA	Howard 2 Ground, Panama City	Panama by 43 runs
Match 6	25 March	Suriname	NA	Turks and Caicos Islands	NA	Howard 1 Ground, Panama City	Turks and Caicos Islands by 44 runs
Match 7	26 March	Bahamas	NA	Belize	NA	Howard 1 Ground, Panama City	Bahamas by 3 wickets
Match 8	26 March	Panama	NA	Suriname	NA	Howard 2 Ground, Panama City	Panama by 7 wickets
Match 9	27 March	Bahamas	NA	Suriname	NA	Howard 2 Ground, Panama City	Bahamas by 7 wickets
Match 10	27 March	Panama	NA	Turks and Caicos Islands	NA	Howard 1 Ground, Panama City	Panama by 70 runs

=== 2004 ICC Intercontinental Cup ===
==== Group stage ====
Africa Group
Team	Pld	W	L	D	NR	Pts
Kenya	2	1	0	1	0	45.5
Uganda	2	1	1	0	0	41
Namibia	2	0	1	1	0	32

Americas Group
Team	Pld	W	L	D	NR	Pts
Canada	2	1	0	1	0	50
United States	2	1	1	0	0	47
Bermuda	2	0	1	1	0	29

Asia Group
Team	Pld	W	L	D	NR	Pts
United Arab Emirates	2	1	0	1	0	50.5
Nepal	2	1	0	1	0	42
Malaysia	2	0	2	0	0	23

Europe Group
Team	Pld	W	L	D	NR	Pts
Scotland	2	1	0	1	0	48.5
Ireland	2	1	1	0	0	43
Netherlands	2	0	1	1	0	27

Group stage
No.	Date	Group	Team 1	Captain 1	Team 2	Captain 2	Venue	Result
First-class	25–27 March	Asia	United Arab Emirates	Khurram Khan	Nepal	Raju Khadka	Sharjah Cricket Association Stadium, Sharjah	Match drawn
First-class	23–25 April	Asia	Nepal	Raju Khadka	Malaysia	Suresh Navaratnam	Tribhuvan University International Cricket Ground, Kirtipur	Nepal by 9 wickets
First-class	23–25 April	Africa	Namibia	Deon Kotze	Uganda	Junior Kwebiha	Wanderers Cricket Ground, Windhoek	Uganda by 5 wickets
First-class	28–30 May	America	United States	Richard Staple	Canada	John Davison	Brian Piccolo Park, Fort Lauderdale	Canada by 104 runs
First-class	11–13 June	Europe	Scotland	Craig Wright	Netherlands	Luuk van Troost	Mannofield Park, Aberdeen	Match drawn
First-class	13–15 July	Europe	Netherlands	Luuk van Troost	Ireland	Kyle McCallan	Sportpark Het Schootsveld, Deventer	Ireland by an innings and 47 runs
First-class	13–15 July	America	Bermuda	Clay Smith	United States	Richard Staple	National Stadium, Hamilton	United States by 114 runs
First-class	23–25 July	Africa	Kenya	Steve Tikolo	Uganda	Junior Kwebiha	Gymkhana Club Ground, Nairobi	Kenya by an innings and 4 runs
First-class	6–8 August	Europe	Ireland	Jason Molins	Scotland	Craig Wright	Clontarf Cricket Club Ground, Dublin	Scotland by 8 wickets
First-class	13–15 August	America	Canada	John Davison	Bermuda	Clay Smith	Sunnybrook Park, Toronto	Match drawn
First-class	17–19 September	Asia	Malaysia	Suresh Navaratnam	United Arab Emirates	Mohammad Tauqir	Selangor Turf Club, Kuala Lumpur	United Arab Emirates by 124 runs
First-class	1–3 October	Africa	Kenya	Hitesh Modi	Namibia	Deon Kotze	Aga Khan Sports Club Ground, Nairobi	Match drawn

==== Finals ====
First-class
No.	Date	Team 1	Captain 1	Team 2	Captain 2	Venue	Result
1st Semi Final	17–19 November	Kenya	Ragheb Aga	Scotland	Craig Wright	Sheikh Zayed Stadium, Abu Dhabi	Match drawn, Scotland progress on group points
No.	Date	Team 1	Captain 1	Team 2	Captain 2	Venue	Result
2nd Semi Final	17–19 November	United Arab Emirates	Mohammad Tauqir	Canada	Ian Billcliff	Sharjah Cricket Association Stadium, Sharjah	Match drawn, Canada progress on group points
No.	Date	Team 1	Captain 1	Team 2	Captain 2	Venue	Result
Final	21–22 November	Canada	Ian Billcliff	Scotland	Craig Wright	Sharjah Cricket Association Stadium, Sharjah	Scotland by an innings and 84 runs
