= 2002 ACC Trophy =

- Administrator: Asian Cricket Council
- Cricket format: 50 overs per side
- Tournament format(s): Round robin and knockout
- Host: Singapore
- Champions: United Arab Emirates (2nd title)
- Participants: 10
- Matches: 23
- Player of the series: (Malaysia) Suresh Navaratnam
- Most runs: (Singapore) Zubin Shroff (309)
- Most wickets: (United Arab Emirates) Arshad Ali (12)
- Official website: CricketArchive

The 2002 ACC Trophy was a cricket tournament held from 10 to 21 July 2002 in Singapore. It gave Associate and Affiliate members of the Asian Cricket Council experience of international one-day cricket and also helped form an essential part of regional rankings.

The tournament was won by the United Arab Emirates, who defeated Nepal in the final by six wickets. This was the UAE's second consecutive title.

== Teams ==
The following ten teams took part in the tournament:

- Kuwait
- Nepal
- Oman
- Qatar
- United Arab Emirates
- Hong Kong
- Malaysia
- Maldives
- Singapore
- Thailand

== Group stages ==
The ten teams were divided into two groups of five, with the top two from each group qualifying for the semi-finals.

=== Group A ===
| Team | Pld | W | L | NR | BP | NRR | Pts |
|---|---|---|---|---|---|---|---|
| United Arab Emirates | 4 | 4 | 0 | 0 | 3 | 2.187 | 11 |
| Nepal | 4 | 3 | 1 | 0 | 3 | 1.718 | 9 |
| Kuwait | 4 | 2 | 2 | 0 | 2 | –0.244 | 6 |
| Oman | 4 | 1 | 3 | 0 | 1 | –1.512 | 3 |
| Qatar | 4 | 0 | 4 | 0 | 0 | –2.348 | 0 |

10 July 2002
(scorecard)

| United Arab Emirates; 196/8 (38 overs) | v | Oman; 58 all out (22.3 overs) |
| Khurram Khan 76 (71); Ameet Sampat 2/15 (4 overs) | | C. Tanki 15 (21); Ahmed Nadeem 4/17 (8 overs) |

United Arab Emirates won by 138 runs
The Padang, Singapore

- Match was reduced to 38 overs per side

11 July 2002
(scorecard)

| Qatar; 100 all out (31 overs) | v | Kuwait; 102/2 (16.5 overs) |
| Mohammad Jahangir 35 (60); Abdullah Khan 3/6 (1 over) | | Ghayoor Ahmed 48* (54); Iftikhar Hussain 2/25 (3.5 overs) |

Kuwait won by 8 wickets
Kallang Ground, Singapore

12 July 2002
(scorecard)

| Nepal; 153/9 (50 overs) | v | Oman; 48 all out (35.3 overs) |
| Shakti Gauchan 37 (95); Hemal Mehta 4/17 (10 overs) | | Jitendra Redkar 12 (69); Mehboob Alam 3/13 (8 overs) |

Nepal won by 105 runs
The Padang, Singapore

14 July 2002
(scorecard)

| United Arab Emirates; 289/9 (50 overs) | v | Kuwait; 123 all out (41.3 overs) |
| Khurram Khan 113 (99); Zakar Anwar 3/44 (10 overs) | | Ghayoor Ahmed 33 (49); Arshad Ali 5/10 (5.3 overs) |

United Arab Emirates won by 166 runs
Kallang Ground, Singapore

14 July 2002
(scorecard)

| Nepal; 210 all out (47.5 overs) | v | Qatar; 80 all out (35.2 overs) |
| Shakti Gauchan 53 (114); Iftikhar Hussain 4/45 (9 overs) | | Ameenullah Khan 15 (20); Mehboob Alam 5/24 (6 overs) |

Nepal won by 130 runs
Indian Association Ground, Singapore

15 July 2002
(scorecard)

| Oman; 267/6 (50 overs) | v | Qatar; 171 all out (43.5 overs) |
| Rakesh Sharma 92 (96); Usman Malik 3/23 (10 overs) | | Irfan Shahid 46 (46); Maqbool Moosa 2/34 (8 overs) |

Oman won by 96 runs
Indian Association Ground, Singapore

16 July 2002
(scorecard)

| Kuwait; 66 all out (23 overs) | v | Oman; 68/2 (14.5 overs) |
| Rakesh Sharma 24 (33); Waheed Janjua 3/24 (10 overs) | | Waheed Janjua 36* (41); Ali Akbar 1/4 (1.5 overs) |

Kuwait won by 8 wickets
Indian Association Ground, Singapore

16 July 2002
(scorecard)

| Nepal; 159/9 (50 overs) | v | United Arab Emirates; 162/4 (44.4 overs) |
| Parash Luniya 35 (60); Khurram Khan 2/19 (10 overs) | | Arshad Ali 67 (104); Bardan Chalise 1/15 (3 overs) |

United Arab Emirates won by 6 wickets
The Padang, Singapore

17 July 2002
(scorecard)

| Nepal; 288/6 (50 overs) | v | Kuwait; 164 all out (35.1 overs) |
| Dipendra Chaudhary 80* (96); Hasan Arif 4/57 (10 overs) | | Waheed Janjua 43 (33); Basanta Regmi 3/31 (9.1 overs) |

Nepal won by 124 runs
The Padang, Singapore

17 July 2002
(scorecard)

| Qatar; 158/9 (50 overs) | v | United Arab Emirates; 159/4 (34 overs) |
| Ameenullah Khan 38 (32); Mohammad Tauqir 3/32 (9 overs) | | Asim Saeed 68 (91); Irfan Shahid 2/27 (10 overs) |

United Arab Emirates won by 6 wickets
The Padang, Singapore

=== Group B ===
| Team | Pld | W | L | NR | BP | NRR | Pts |
|---|---|---|---|---|---|---|---|
| Malaysia | 4 | 4 | 0 | 0 | 3 | 1.868 | 11 |
| Hong Kong | 4 | 3 | 1 | 0 | 2 | 1.736 | 8 |
| Singapore | 4 | 2 | 2 | 0 | 1 | 1.441 | 5 |
| Maldives | 4 | 1 | 3 | 0 | 1 | 0.212 | 3 |
| Thailand | 4 | 0 | 4 | 0 | 0 | –5.375 | 0 |

10 July 2002
(scorecard)

| Malaysia; 271/6 (40 overs) | v | Thailand; 77 all out (25.4 overs) |
| Yazid Imran 109 (47); A.J. Khan 3/32 (8 overs) | | R. Suchakankha 15 (49); Chew Pok Cheong 4/17 (5 overs) |

Malaysia won by 194 runs
Indian Association Ground, Singapore

- Match was reduced to 40 overs per side

11 July 2002
(scorecard)

| Hong Kong; 222/5 (36 overs) | v | Singapore; 206/8 (36 overs) |
| Tabarak Dar 56 (61); Sunder Mani 2/36 (8 over) | | Zubin Shroff 101* (99); Sher Lama 5/34 (7 overs) |

Hong Kong won by 6 runs (D/L)
Kallang Ground, Singapore

- Match was reduced to 36 overs per side, Singapore target was 213 runs

11 July 2002
(scorecard)

| Singapore; 206 all out (48.2 overs) | v | Maldives; 144/8 (25 overs) |
| Zubin Shroff 42 (62); Afzal Faiz 4/20 (4.2 overs) | | Moosa Kaleem 55 (53); Sunder Mani 3/34 (5 overs) |

Singapore won by 7 wickets (D/L)
The Padang, Singapore

- Maldives target was 152 runs in 25 overs

12 July 2002
(scorecard)

| Hong Kong; 326/5 (48 overs) | v | Thailand; 95 all out (36.1 overs) |
| Rahul Sharma 105 (66); Varin Silpadhanichkun 3/63 (10 overs) | | S. Suphavadeeprasit 36 (93); Rahul Sharma 3/13 (6.1 overs) |

Hong Kong won by 231 runs
Indian Association Ground, Singapore

- Match was reduced to 48 overs per side

12 July 2002
(scorecard)

| Malaysia; 161 all out (39.4 overs) | v | Maldives; 119 all out (35.1 overs) |
| Yazid Imran 35 (41); Ismail Nihad 3/25 (7 overs) | | Moosa Kaleem 31 (50); Chew Pok Cheong 3/22 (8 overs) |

Malaysia won by 42 runs
Kallang Ground, Singapore

- Match was reduced to 40 overs per side

14 July 2002
(scorecard)

| Hong Kong; 159 all out (48.5 overs) | v | Malaysia; 160/9 (48.5 overs) |
| Ravi Sujanani 31 (81); Suresh Navaratnam 4/27 (10 overs) | | Yazid Imran 37; Sher Lama 3/24 (9.5 overs) |

Malaysia won by 1 wicket
The Padang, Singapore

15 July 2002
(scorecard)

| Hong Kong; 347/2 (50 overs) | v | Maldives; 259 all out (48.2 overs) |
| Alexander French 203 (158); Abdullah Shahid 1/63 (10 overs) | | Moosa Kaleem 91 (85); Jawaid Iqbal 3/41 (10 overs) |

Hong Kong won by 88 runs
Kallang Ground, Singapore

15 July 2002
(scorecard)

| Malaysia; 203/5 (50 overs) | v | Singapore; 109 all out (42.4 overs) |
| Rakesh Madhavan 72 (114); Rishi Kaul 2/24 (10 overs) | | Suneth Mendis 25 (46); Marimuthu Muniandy 4/9 (6.4 overs) |

Malaysia won by 94 runs
The Padang, Singapore

16 July 2002
(scorecard)

| Singapore; 440/2 (50 overs) | v | Thailand; 115 all out (41.3 overs) |
| Kapila Mendis 191 (139); H.D. Singh 2/61 (5 overs) | | A.J. Khan 24 (26); Rishi Kaul 3/17 (8 overs) |

Singapore won by 325 runs
Kallang Ground, Singapore

17 July 2002
(scorecard)

| Thailand; 121 all out (48.5 overs) | v | Maldives; 125/2 (16 overs) |
| Anil Tanwani 52; Ahmed Amir 3/14 (7.5 overs) | | Moosa Kaleem 51*; Varin Silpadhanichkun 1/30 (6 overs) |

Maldives won by 8 wickets
Indian Association Ground, Singapore

== Semi-finals ==
19 July 2002
(scorecard)

| United Arab Emirates; 280/7 (50 overs) | v | Hong Kong; 193 all out (48.2 overs) |
| Asim Saeed 55 (73); Rahul Sharma 2/37 (7 overs) | | Saleem Malik 52 (38); Khurram Khan 4/46 (9.2 overs) |

United Arab Emirates won by 87 runs
Kallang Ground, Singapore

19 July 2002
(scorecard)

| Nepal; 181/9 (50 overs) | v | Malaysia; 156 all out (47.2 overs) |
| Shakti Gauchan 67 (110); Noor Roslee 2/30 (8 overs) | | Eszrafiq Aziz 50; Raj Pradhan 3/39 (? overs) |

Nepal won by 25 runs
Indian Association Ground, Singapore

- Malaysia innings scorecard incomplete

== Final ==
21 July 2002
(scorecard)

| Nepal; 184 all out (50 overs) | v | United Arab Emirates; 185/4 (38.3 overs) |
| Paresh Lohani 52 (79); Arshad Ali 4/24 (6 overs) | | Khurram Khan 60 (63); Binod Das 2/27 (7 overs) |

United Arab Emirates won by 6 wickets
Kallang Ground, Singapore

== Statistics ==
| Most runs | | Most wickets | |
|---|---|---|---|
| (Nepal) Janak Bhandari | 324 | (United Arab Emirates) Arshad Ali | 12 |
| (United Arab Emirates) Khurram Khan | 299 | (Nepal) Mehboob Alam | 11 |
| (Hong Kong) Rahul Sharma | 272 | (Malaysia) Suresh Navaratnam | 11 |
| (Singapore) Kapila Mendis | 260 | (United Arab Emirates) Mohammad Tauqir | 11 |
| (Nepal) Shakti Gauchan | 248 | (United Arab Emirates) Ahmed Nadeem | 10 |
