= 2015 Cricket World Cup squads =

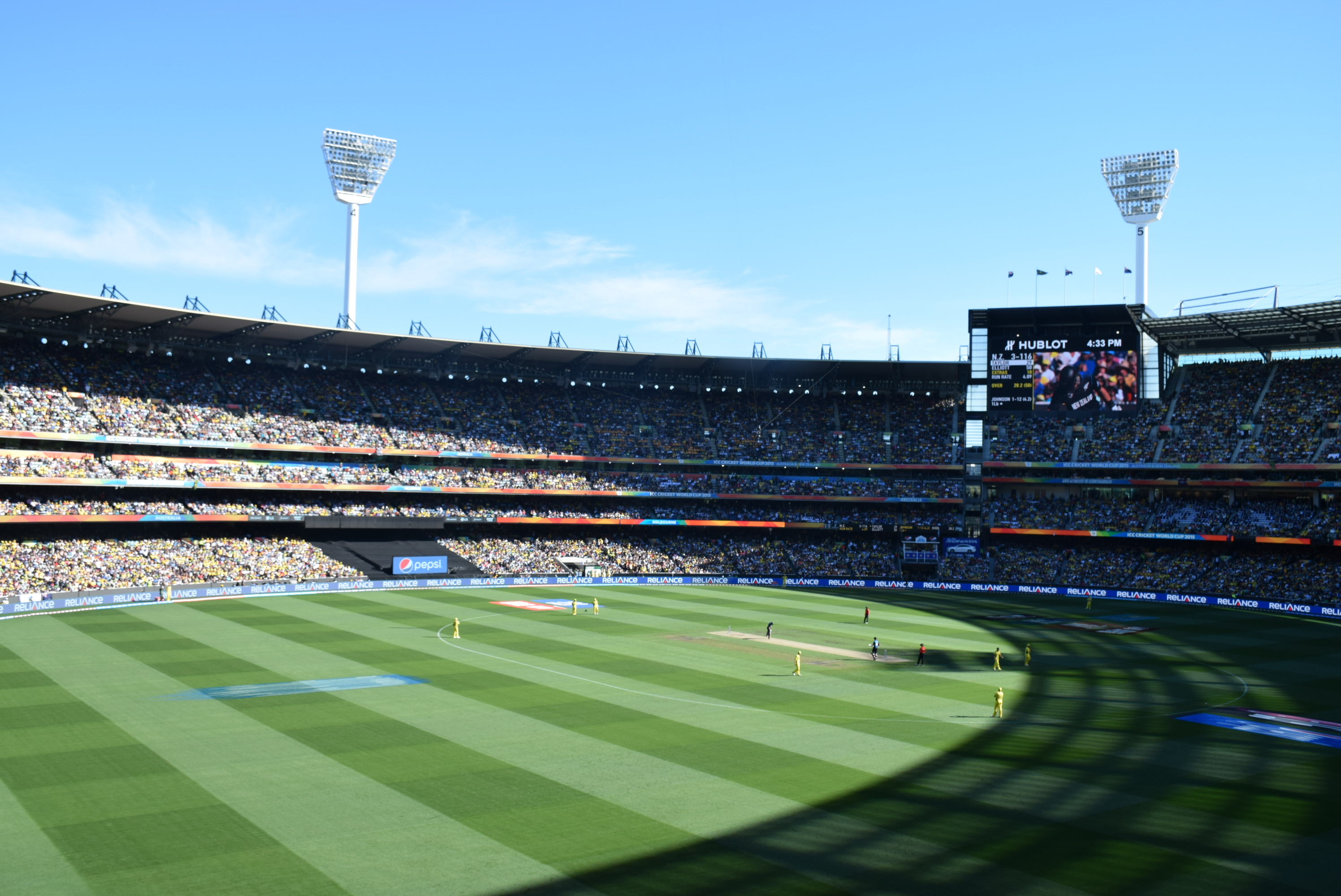
Melbourne Cricket Ground, the venue for the 2015 Cricket World Cup Final. The ground also hosted the 1992 Cricket World Cup Final.

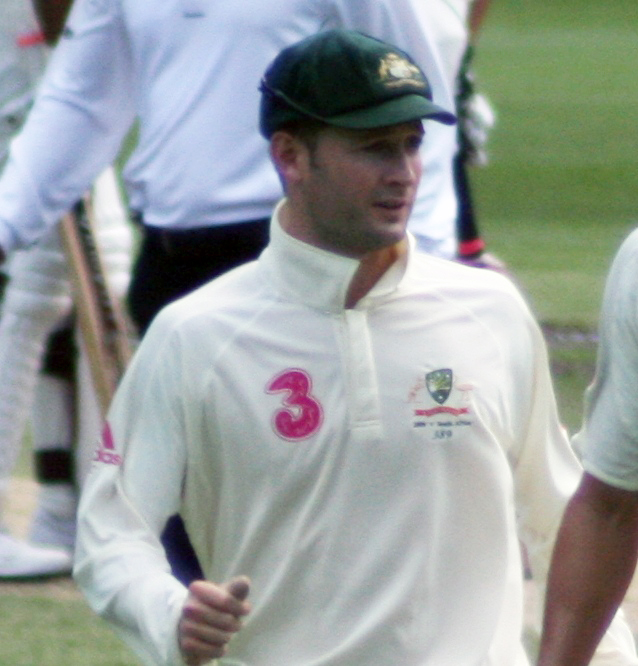
Michael Clarke, the Australian captain. The final was his last ODI appearance.

The 2015 Cricket World Cup was the 11th Cricket World Cup, jointly hosted by Australia and New Zealand; India were the defending champions, having won the tournament in 2011. The 2015 Cricket World Cup Final took place at the Melbourne Cricket Ground, and was won by Australia, who defeated New Zealand by 7 wickets in the final.

The fourteen teams that competed at the 2015 World Cup were all required to submit a final 15-man squad to the ICC headquarters in Dubai on or before 7 January 2015, although the squads did not have to be publicly that date. In order to assist this process, many teams chose to name larger probable squads in November or December, with the understanding that the final squad would be picked from within these players. Changes to the squad were allowed after this deadline at the discretion of the ICC's Technical Committee in necessary cases, such as due to player injury, and so some teams also chose to name standby players alongside their 15-man squad.

Sri Lanka chose to name veteran players Mahela Jayawardene and Kumar Sangakkara in their squad- they were the two most experienced ODI players at the tournament, as Jayawardene has played over 400 ODIs for Sri Lanka, and Sangakkara played his 400th ODI during the tournament. Jayawardene was also the most experienced World Cup player at the tournament, with 33 previous appearances. UAE's Khurram Khan was the oldest player at the tournament, whilst fellow Emirati Mohammad Tauqir became the oldest ever World Cup captain; both players were 43 years old. (Note: Some sources suggest that Mohammad Tauqir was born on 21 June 1971, the same day as Khurram Khan, however others (including Cricinfo) suggest that Tauqir was born on 14 January 1972.) Afghanistan's Usman Ghani was the youngest player at the tournament, at the age of 18.

Below is a list of the squads chosen for the 2015 Cricket World Cup.

== Key ==
Symbol	Meaning
No.	Squad number
Player	Player name, as used on their own Wikipedia articles. Also shows if they are team's designated captain or vice-captain.
Date of birth	Date of birth, and age as of 14 February 2015.
ODIs	The number of One Day Internationals played as of 14 February 2015. (Note: This figure is inclusive of appearances for current national team, a previous national team, ACA African XI, ACC Asian XI, and the ICC World XI.)
Batting	Hand they bat with
Bowling style	Type(s) of bowling bowled
List A or Domestic Team	Either List A team, or domestic one-day team if the country's one-day matches do not have List A status.
CWC15	Number of appearances at the 2015 Cricket World Cup.
Refs	References

== Group A ==
=== Afghanistan ===
Afghanistan named their 15-man squad on 29 December 2014. In addition to the 15-man squad presented, Afghanistan also named four standby players: Shafiqullah, Sharafuddin Ashraf, Izatullah Dawlatzai, Hashmatullah Shaidi.

Coach: (England) Andy Moles

No.	Player	Date of birth	ODIs	Batting	Bowling style	List A or Domestic team	CWC 15	Refs
7	Mohammad Nabi (c)	1 January 1985 (aged 30)	45	Right	Right-arm off break	Band-e-Amir Dragons	6
23	Javed Ahmadi (vc)	2 January 1992 (aged 23)	19	Right	Right-arm off break	Amo Sharks	6
55	Aftab Alam	30 November 1992 (aged 22)	8	Right	Right-arm medium-fast	Speen Ghar Tigers	1
16	Mirwais Ashraf^{1} (withdrawn)	30 June 1988 (aged 26)	28	Right	Right-arm fast-medium	Amo Sharks	2
87	Usman Ghani	20 November 1996 (aged 18)	12	Right	None	Amo Sharks	2
66	Hamid Hassan	1 June 1987 (aged 27)	24	Right	Right-arm fast	Speen Ghar Tigers	6
33	Nasir Jamal	21 December 1993 (aged 21)	4	Right	Right-arm leg break googly	Boost Defenders	1
48	Nawroz Mangal	15 July 1984 (aged 30)	34	Right	Right-arm off break	Mis Ainak Knights	6
11	Gulbadin Naib	16 March 1991 (aged 23)	14	Right	Right-arm medium-fast	Mis Ainak Knights	1
28	Shafiqullah (wk)^{1}	7 August 1989 (aged 25)	11	Right	None	Speen Ghar Tigers	1
45	Samiullah Shenwari	3 February 1987 (aged 28)	44	Right	Right-arm leg break	Amo Sharks	6
44	Asghar Afghan	22 December 1987 (aged 27)	38	Right	Right-arm medium-fast	Band-e-Amir Dragons	5
10	Dawlat Zadran	19 March 1988 (aged 26)	24	Right	Right-arm fast-medium	Mis Ainak Knights	5
1	Najibullah Zadran	28 February 1993 (aged 21)	10	Left	Right-arm off break	Boost Defenders	6
20	Shapoor Zadran	8 July 1987 (aged 27)	30	Left	Left-arm fast-medium	Boost Defenders	6
78	Afsar Zazai (wk)	10 August 1993 (aged 21)	8	Right	None	Mis Ainak Knights	6

^{1} On 25 February, Mirwais Ashraf was ruled out of the World Cup, and replaced by Shafiqullah.

=== Australia ===
Australia announced their 15-man squad publicly on 11 January 2015. Michael Clarke's selection was provisional on his fitness, but on 18 February, Clarke was declared fit to play against Bangladesh. As this match was abandoned without a ball being bowled, Clarke's first game of the World Cup was against co-hosts New Zealand on 28 February. George Bailey captained the side in their opening game against England, but was then dropped from the team when Clarke returned.

Coach: (Australia) Darren Lehmann

No.	Player	Date of birth	ODIs	Batting	Bowling style	List A or Domestic team	CWC 15 (Note: The Australia vs Bangladesh Group Stage match was abandoned without a toss, and so no players are counted as playing in that match.)	Refs
23	Michael Clarke (c)	2 April 1981 (aged 33)	238	Right	Slow left-arm orthodox	New South Wales	7
2	George Bailey (vc)	7 September 1982 (aged 32)	56	Right	Right-arm medium	Tasmania	1
30	Pat Cummins	8 May 1993 (aged 21)	10	Right	Right-arm fast	New South Wales	2
3	Xavier Doherty	22 November 1982 (aged 32)	59	Right	Slow left-arm orthodox	Tasmania	1
44	James Faulkner	29 April 1990 (aged 24)	38	Right	Left-arm medium-fast	Tasmania	6
16	Aaron Finch	17 November 1986 (aged 28)	41	Right	Slow left-arm orthodox	Victoria	8
57	Brad Haddin (wk)	23 October 1977 (aged 37)	118	Right	None	New South Wales	8
38	Josh Hazlewood	8 January 1991 (aged 24)	8	Left	Right-arm fast-medium	New South Wales	5
25	Mitchell Johnson	2 November 1981 (aged 33)	145	Left	Left-arm fast	Western Australia	8
8	Mitchell Marsh	20 October 1991 (aged 23)	14	Right	Right-arm fast-medium	Western Australia	3
32	Glenn Maxwell	14 October 1988 (aged 26)	41	Right	Right-arm Off-break	Victoria	8
49	Steve Smith	2 June 1989 (aged 25)	50	Right	Right-arm Leg-break Googly	New South Wales	8
56	Mitchell Starc	30 January 1990 (aged 25)	33	Left	Left-arm fast	New South Wales	8
31	David Warner	27 October 1986 (aged 28)	54	Left	Right-arm Leg-break	New South Wales	8
33	Shane Watson	17 June 1981 (aged 33)	180	Right	Right-arm fast-medium	New South Wales	7

=== Bangladesh ===
Bangladesh announced their 15-member squad on 4 January 2015. The squad was initially scheduled to be announced at 1300 local time (UTC+06:00). However, it was delayed by two hours as a result of a last minute discussion between the selection committee, the board of directors of the BCB, and BCB President Nazmul Hassan. Two standby players were also announced, with Shafiul Islam, Abul Hasan named. After receiving a 40% match fee fine and a warning for slow over rate, captain Mashrafe Mortaza sat out of the last Group Stage match against New Zealand, to avoid being suspended for their quarter-final with India; Shakib Al Hasan captained the team for this match.

Coach: Chandika Hathurusingha

No.	Player	Date of birth	ODIs	Batting	Bowling style	List A or Domestic team	CWC 15	Refs
2	Mashrafe Mortaza (c)	5 October 1983 (aged 31)	144	Right	Right-arm fast-medium	Mohammedan Sporting Club	5
75	Shakib Al Hasan (vc)	24 March 1987 (aged 27)	141	Left	Left-arm orthodox	Legends of Rupganj	6
3	Taskin Ahmed	3 April 1995 (aged 19)	3	Left	Right-arm fast-medium	Prime Bank Cricket Club	6
66	Anamul Haque (wk)^{2} (withdrawn)	16 December 1992 (aged 22)	27	Right	None	Kalabagan Cricket Academy	3
68	Mominul Haque	29 September 1991 (aged 23)	24	Left	Left-arm orthodox	Prime Doleshwar Sporting Club	2
4	Al Amin Hossain^{1} (withdrawn)	1 January 1990 (aged 25)	11	Right	Right-arm medium-fast	Abahani Limited	0
69	Nasir Hossain	30 November 1991 (aged 23)	41	Right	Right-arm off break	Abahani Limited	3
34	Rubel Hossain	1 January 1990 (aged 25)	53	Right	Right-arm medium-fast	Legends of Rupganj	6
29	Tamim Iqbal	20 March 1989 (aged 25)	135	Left	Right-arm off break	Legends of Rupganj	6
30	Shafiul Islam^{1}	6 October 1989 (aged 25)	52	Right	Right-arm fast-medium	Prime Doleshwar Sporting Club	0
12	Taijul Islam	7 February 1992 (aged 23)	1	Left	Left-arm orthodox	Prime Bank Cricket Club	1
62	Imrul Kayes^{2}	2 February 1987 (aged 28)	53	Left	None	Victoria Sporting Club	3
30	Mahmudullah Riyad	22 December 1986 (aged 28)	110	Right	Right-arm off break	Prime Bank Cricket Club	6
15	Mushfiqur Rahim (wk)	1 September 1988 (aged 26)	140	Right	None	Prime Doleshwar Sporting Club	6
1	Sabbir Rahman	22 November 1991 (aged 23)	5	Right	Right-arm leg break	Kalabagan Cricket Academy	6
11	Soumya Sarkar	25 February 1993 (aged 21)	1	Left	Right-arm medium-fast	Prime Bank Cricket Club	6
6	Arafat Sunny	29 September 1986 (aged 28)	8	Left	Left-arm orthodox	Sheikh Jamal Dhanmondi Club	1

^{1} On 23 February, Al-Amin Hossain was sent home from the tournament after breaking a team curfew. He was replaced by Shafiul Islam.
^{2} On 6 March, the injured Anamul Haque was replaced by Imrul Kayes.

=== England ===
England were the first team to name their 15-man squad, doing so on 20 December 2014. The same 15-man squad was used for the Carlton Mid Triangular Series in Australia in 2014–15, and was captained by Eoin Morgan after Alastair Cook was sacked as ODI captain in December. Shortly before the World Cup, Jos Buttler was named as vice-captain for the tournament.

Coach: Peter Moores

No.	Player	Date of birth	ODIs	Batting	Bowling style	List A or Domestic team	CWC 15	Refs
16	Eoin Morgan (c) (Note: 23 ODIs for Ireland.)	10 September 1986 (aged 28)	135	Left	Right-arm medium	Middlesex	6
63	Jos Buttler (vc & wk)	8 September 1990 (aged 24)	49	Right	None	Lancashire	6
18	Moeen Ali	18 June 1987 (aged 27)	17	Left	Right-arm off break	Worcestershire	5
9	James Anderson	30 July 1982 (aged 32)	188	Left	Right-arm fast-medium	Lancashire	6
48	Gary Ballance	22 November 1989 (aged 25)	12	Left	Right-arm leg break	Yorkshire	4
7	Ian Bell	11 April 1982 (aged 32)	155	Right	Right-arm medium	Warwickshire	6
10	Ravi Bopara	4 May 1985 (aged 29)	119	Right	Right-arm medium	Essex	1
8	Stuart Broad	24 June 1986 (aged 28)	113	Left	Right-arm fast-medium	Nottinghamshire	6
11	Steven Finn	4 April 1989 (aged 25)	52	Right	Right-arm fast	Middlesex	4
35	Alex Hales	3 January 1989 (aged 26)	7	Right	Right-arm medium	Nottinghamshire	2
34	Chris Jordan	4 October 1988 (aged 26)	20	Right	Right-arm fast-medium	Sussex	2
5	Joe Root	30 December 1990 (aged 24)	48	Right	Right-arm off break	Yorkshire	6
38	James Taylor	6 January 1990 (aged 25)	11	Right	Right-arm leg break	Nottinghamshire	6
53	James Tredwell	27 February 1982 (aged 32)	44	Left	Right-arm off break	Kent	1
19	Chris Woakes	2 March 1989 (aged 25)	29	Right	Right-arm fast-medium	Warwickshire	5

=== New Zealand ===
New Zealand released their 15-man squad to the public on 8 January 2015.

Coach: Mike Hesson

No.	Player	Date of birth	ODIs	Batting	Bowling style	List A or Domestic team	CWC 15	Refs
42	Brendon McCullum (c)	27 September 1981 (aged 33)	240	Right	Right-arm medium	Otago	9
22	Kane Williamson (vc)	8 August 1990 (aged 24)	65	Right	Right-arm off-break	Northern Districts	9
78	Corey Anderson	13 December 1990 (aged 24)	26	Left	Left-arm medium-fast	Northern Districts	9
18	Trent Boult	22 July 1989 (aged 25)	16	Right	Left-arm fast-medium	Northern Districts	9
88	Grant Elliott	21 March 1979 (aged 35)	58	Right	Right-arm medium-fast	Wellington	9
31	Martin Guptill	30 September 1986 (aged 28)	99	Right	Right-arm off-break	Auckland	9
21	Matt Henry^{1}	14 December 1991 (aged 23)	8	Right	Right-arm fast medium	Canterbury	2
23	Tom Latham (wk)	2 April 1992 (aged 22)	26	Left	Right-arm medium	Canterbury	0
81	Mitchell McClenaghan	11 June 1986 (aged 28)	34	Left	Left-arm fast-medium	Auckland	1
15	Nathan McCullum	1 September 1980 (aged 34)	78	Right	Right-arm off-break	Otago	0
37	Kyle Mills	15 March 1979 (aged 35)	170	Right	Right-arm fast-medium	Auckland	0
20	Adam Milne^{1} (withdrawn)	13 April 1992 (aged 22)	16	Right	Right-arm fast	Central Districts	6
54	Luke Ronchi (wk)	23 April 1981 (aged 33)	40 (Note: 4 ODIs for Australia.)	Right	None	Wellington	9
38	Tim Southee	11 December 1988 (aged 26)	85	Right	Right-arm medium-fast	Northern Districts	9
3	Ross Taylor	8 March 1984 (aged 30)	150	Right	Right-arm off break	Central Districts	9
11	Daniel Vettori	27 January 1979 (aged 36)	286	Left	Slow left-arm orthodox	Northern Districts	9

^{1} On 22 March, Adam Milne was ruled out of the World Cup with a heel injury. He was replaced by Matt Henry.

=== Scotland ===
Scotland released their 15-man squad to the public on 9 January 2015. They had previously released a 24-man provisional squad on 9 December 2014, which included all the players who went on their warm-up tour of Australia and New Zealand in September/October 2014.

Head coach: Grant Bradburn

No.	Player	Date of birth	ODIs	Batting	Bowling style	List A or Domestic team	CWC 15	Refs
1	Preston Mommsen (c)	14 October 1987 (aged 27)	30	Right	Right-arm off break	Carlton; Highlanders	6
15	Kyle Coetzer (vc)	14 April 1984 (aged 30)	20	Right	Right-arm medium-fast	Northamptonshire	6
44	Richie Berrington	4 March 1987 (aged 27)	39	Right	Right-arm medium-fast	Clydesdale; Reivers	6
6	Freddie Coleman	15 December 1991 (aged 23)	13	Right	Right-arm off break	Warwickshire	3
9	Matthew Cross (wk)	15 October 1992 (aged 22)	11	Right	None	Nottinghamshire	6
38	Josh Davey	3 August 1990 (aged 24)	18	Right	Right-arm medium-fast	Somerset	6
45	Alasdair Evans	12 January 1989 (aged 26)	8	Right	Right-arm fast-medium	Carlton; Highlanders	4
48	Hamish Gardiner	4 January 1991 (aged 24)	8	Right	None	Carlton; Highlanders	3
77	Majid Haq^{1} (withdrawn)	11 February 1983 (aged 32)	50	Left	Right-arm off break	Clydesdale; Reivers	4
29	Michael Leask	29 October 1990 (aged 24)	8	Right	Right-arm off break	Northamptonshire	6
14	Matt Machan	15 February 1991 (aged 23)	16	Left	Right-arm off break	Sussex	6
10	Calum MacLeod	15 November 1988 (aged 26)	27	Right	Right-arm medium-fast	Durham	6
50	Safyaan Sharif	24 May 1991 (aged 23)	12	Right	Right-arm medium-fast	Reivers	0
42	Robert Taylor	21 December 1989 (aged 25)	11	Left	Left-arm medium	Leicestershire	2
8	Iain Wardlaw	29 June 1985 (aged 29)	17	Right	Right-arm fast-medium	Yorkshire	5

^{1} On 11 March, Majid Haq was sent home after breaking the team's internal code of conduct.

=== Sri Lanka ===
Sri Lanka named their 15-man squad on 7 January 2015. Lasith Malinga's selection was provisional on his fitness, however he was passed fit prior to Sri Lanka's opening match, and played in every match. However, over the course of the tournament, five other players had to be withdrawn due to injury. Sri Lanka used 19 different players over the course of the World Cup, more than any other team; every squad player except Prasad made an appearance at the World Cup.

Coach: Marvan Atapattu

No.	Player	Date of birth	ODIs	Batting	Bowling style	List A or Domestic team	CWC 15	Refs
69	Angelo Mathews (c)	2 June 1987 (aged 27)	149	Right	Right-arm fast-medium	Colts	7
66	Lahiru Thirimanne (vc)	8 September 1989 (aged 25)	87	Left	Right-arm medium-fast	Ragama	7
16	Dushmantha Chameera^{1}	11 January 1992 (aged 23)	1	Right	Right-arm medium-fast	Nondescripts	2
36	Dinesh Chandimal (wk)^{4} (withdrawn)	18 November 1989 (aged 25)	92	Right	Right-arm off break	Nondescripts	3
23	Tillakaratne Dilshan	14 October 1976 (aged 38)	307	Right	Right-arm off break	Bloomfield	7
14	Rangana Herath^{5} (withdrawn)	19 March 1978 (aged 36)	67	Left	Slow left-arm orthodox	Tamil Union	4
27	Mahela Jayawardene	27 May 1977 (aged 37)	441	Right	Right-arm medium	Sinhalese	7
21	Dimuth Karunaratne^{3} (withdrawn)	21 April 1988 (aged 26)	13	Left	Right-arm medium	Sinhalese	4
34	Tharindu Kaushal^{5}	5 March 1993 (aged 21)	0	Right	Right-arm off break	Nondescripts	1
92	Nuwan Kulasekara	22 July 1982 (aged 32)	165	Right	Right-arm fast-medium	Colts	3
82	Suranga Lakmal	10 March 1987 (aged 27)	31	Right	Right-arm medium-fast	Tamil Union	4
99	Lasith Malinga	28 August 1983 (aged 31)	177	Right	Right-arm fast	Nondescripts	7
9	Jeevan Mendis^{2} (withdrawn)	15 January 1983 (aged 32)	52	Left	Right-arm leg break	Tamil Union	2
8	Kusal Perera^{4}	17 August 1990 (aged 24)	41	Left	None	Colts	2
1	Thisara Perera	3 April 1989 (aged 25)	98	Left	Right-arm medium-fast	Sinhalese	6
30	Dhammika Prasad^{1} (withdrawn)	30 May 1983 (aged 31)	24	Right	Right-arm fast-medium	Sinhalese	0
6	Seekkuge Prasanna^{3}	27 June 1985 (aged 29)	23	right	Right-arm leg break	Sri Lanka Army	2
11	Kumar Sangakkara (wk)	27 October 1977 (aged 37)	397	Left	Right-arm off break	Nondescripts	7
18	Sachithra Senanayake	9 February 1985 (aged 30)	44	Right	Right-arm off break	Sinhalese	1
30	Upul Tharanga^{2}	2 February 1985 (aged 30)	171	Left	None	Nondescripts	1

^{1} On 7 February, Prasad was ruled out of the World Cup, after fracturing his hand in training. He was replaced by Dushmantha Chameera on 9 February.
^{2} On 25 February, Jeevan Mendis was ruled out of the World Cup with a hamstring injury. He was replaced by Upul Tharanga.
^{3} On 5 March, Dimuth Karunathne was ruled out of the World Cup with an injury to his little finger. He was replaced by Seekkuge Prasanna.
^{4} On 10 March, Dinesh Chandimal was ruled out of the World Cup with a hamstring injury. He was replaced by Kusal Perera.
^{5} On 17 March, Rangana Herath was ruled out of the World Cup with an injury to his spinning finger. He was replaced by Tharindu Kaushal.

== Group B ==
=== India ===
India named their 15-man squad on 6 January 2015. India used the same 11 players for every match except against the UAE, where Bhuvneshwar Kumar played instead of Mohammed Shami, as a result, they used the fewest players (12) of any team in the tournament.

Coach: Duncan Fletcher

No.	Player	Date of birth	ODIs	Batting	Bowling style	List A or Domestic team	CWC 15	Refs
7	MS Dhoni (c & wk)	7 July 1981 (aged 33)	254	Right	Right-arm medium	Jharkhand	8
18	Virat Kohli (vc)	5 November 1988 (aged 26)	150	Right	Right-arm medium	Delhi	8
99	Ravichandran Ashwin	17 September 1986 (aged 28)	88	Right	Right-arm off break	Tamil Nadu	8
84	Stuart Binny	3 June 1984 (aged 30)	9	Right	Right-arm medium	Karnataka	0
25	Shikhar Dhawan	5 December 1985 (aged 29)	53	Left	Right-arm off break	Delhi	8
8	Ravindra Jadeja	6 December 1988 (aged 26)	111	Left	Slow left-arm orthodox	Saurashtra	8
15	Bhuvneshwar Kumar	5 February 1990 (aged 25)	44	Right	Right-arm medium fast	Uttar Pradesh	1
20	Axar Patel	20 January 1994 (aged 21)	13	Left	Slow left-arm orthodox	Gujarat	0
27	Ajinkya Rahane	5 June 1988 (aged 26)	46	Right	Right-arm medium	Mumbai	8
3	Suresh Raina	27 November 1986 (aged 28)	207	Left	Right-arm off break	Uttar Pradesh	8
5	Ambati Rayudu (wk)	23 September 1985 (aged 29)	27	Right	Right-arm off break	Baroda	0
11	Mohammed Shami	9 March 1990 (aged 24)	40	Right	Right-arm fast	Bengal	7
1	Ishant Sharma^{1} (withdrawn)	2 September 1988 (aged 26)	76	Right	Right-arm fast-medium	Delhi	0
6	Mohit Sharma^{1}	18 September 1988 (aged 26)	12	Right	Right-arm medium fast	Haryana	8
45	Rohit Sharma	30 April 1987 (aged 27)	127	Right	Right-arm off break	Mumbai	8
19	Umesh Yadav	25 October 1987 (aged 27)	74	Right	Right-arm fast	Vidarbha	8

^{1} On 7 February, Ishant Sharma was ruled out of the World Cup, after failing to recover from a knee injury. He was replaced by Mohit Sharma.

=== Ireland ===
Ireland announced their 15-member squad on 5 January 2015. The squad was the same as for the Dubai Triangular Series 2014–15.

Coach: Phil Simmons

No.	Player	Date of birth	ODIs	Batting	Bowling style	List A or Domestic team	CWC 15	Refs
6	William Porterfield (c)	6 September 1984 (aged 30)	73	Left	Right-arm off break	Warwickshire	6
63	Andrew Balbirnie (vc)	28 December 1990 (aged 24)	11	Right	Right-arm off break	Leinster	6
28	Peter Chase	9 October 1993 (aged 21)	1	Right	Right-arm medium-fast	Durham	0
83	Alex Cusack	29 October 1980 (aged 34)	54	Right	Right-arm medium-fast	Leinster	4
50	George Dockrell	22 July 1992 (aged 22)	42	Right	Left-arm orthodox	Somerset	6
24	Ed Joyce	22 September 1978 (aged 36)	45 (Note: 17 ODIs for England)	Left	Right-arm medium	Sussex	6
35	Andrew McBrine	30 April 1993 (aged 21)	3	Left	Right-arm off break	North West	3
10	John Mooney	10 February 1982 (aged 33)	54	Left	Right-arm medium	Leinster	6
34	Tim Murtagh^{1} (withdrawn)	2 August 1981 (aged 33)	10	Left	Right-arm fast-medium	Middlesex	0
22	Kevin O'Brien	4 March 1984 (aged 30)	84	Right	Right-arm medium-fast	Leinster	6
72	Niall O'Brien (wk)	8 November 1981 (aged 33)	64	Left	None	Leicestershire	6
26	Max Sorensen^{1}	18 November 1985 (aged 29)	9	Right	Right-arm fast-medium	Leinster	3
1	Paul Stirling	7 September 1990 (aged 24)	51	Right	Right-arm off break	Middlesex	6
17	Stuart Thompson	15 August 1991 (aged 23)	7	Left	Right-arm medium-fast	North West	2
14	Gary Wilson (wk)	5 February 1986 (aged 29)	52	Right	None	Surrey	6
44	Craig Young	4 April 1990 (aged 24)	6	Right	Right-arm medium	North West	0

^{1} Max Sorensen replaced Tim Murtagh, who was originally selected before pulling out due to injury.

=== Pakistan ===
Pakistan named their 15-man squad on 7 January 2015.

Coach: Waqar Younis

No.	Player	Date of birth	ODIs	Batting	Bowling style	List A or Domestic team	CWC 15	Refs
22	Misbah-ul-Haq (c)	28 May 1974 (aged 40)	155	Right	Right-arm leg break	Khan Research Laboratories	7
10	Shahid Afridi (vc)	1 March 1980 (aged 34)	391	Right	Right-arm leg break	Habib Bank Limited	7
91	Ehsan Adil	15 March 1993 (aged 21)	4	Right	Right-arm fast-medium	Habib Bank Limited	2
54	Sarfaraz Ahmed (wk)	22 May 1987 (aged 27)	36	Right	None	Pakistan International Airlines	3
3	Umar Akmal (wk)	26 May 1990 (aged 24)	104	Right	None	Sui Northern Gas Pipelines Limited	7
90	Rahat Ali^{1}	12 September 1988 (aged 26)	1	Right	Left-arm fast-medium	Khan Research Laboratories; Baluchistan Warriors	5
8	Mohammad Hafeez^{2} (withdrawn)	17 October 1980 (aged 34)	155	Right	Right-arm off break (Note: Hafeez was banned from bowling for the duration of the World Cup.)	Sui Northern Gas Pipelines Limited	0
76	Mohammad Irfan	6 June 1982 (aged 32)	40	Right	Left-arm fast	Khan Research Laboratories	5
77	Nasir Jamshed^{2}	6 December 1989 (aged 25)	45	Left	None	National Bank of Pakistan	3
83	Junaid Khan^{1} (withdrawn)	24 December 1989 (aged 25)	48	Right	Left-arm fast	Khyber Pakhtunkhwa Fighters	0
14	Sohail Khan	6 March 1984 (aged 30)	5	Right	Right-arm medium-fast	Sindh	7
75	Younis Khan	29 November 1977 (aged 37)	261	Right	Right-arm medium & leg break	Habib Bank Limited	3
92	Sohaib Maqsood	15 April 1987 (aged 27)	18	Right	Right-arm off break	Baluchistan Warriors	7
47	Wahab Riaz	28 June 1985 (aged 29)	47	Right	Left-arm fast	Punjab Badshahs	7
86	Yasir Shah	2 May 1986 (aged 28)	1	Right	Right-arm leg break	Khyber Pakhtunkhwa Fighters	1
19	Ahmed Shehzad	23 November 1991 (aged 23)	58	Right	Right-arm leg break	Habib Bank Limited	7
89	Haris Sohail	9 January 1989 (aged 26)	11	Left	Left-arm orthodox	Zarai Taraqiati Bank	6

^{1} On 2 February, Junaid Khan pulled out of the World Cup with a hamstring injury. On 6 February, the ICC approved Rahat Ali as a replacement for Junaid Khan.
^{2} On 8 February, Mohammad Hafeez was ruled out of the World Cup with a calf injury, and was replaced by Nasir Jamshed.

=== South Africa ===
South Africa named their squad on 7 January 2015.

Coach: Russell Domingo

No.	Player	Date of birth	ODIs	Batting	Bowling style	List A or Domestic team	CWC 15	Refs
17	AB de Villiers (c & wk)	17 February 1984 (aged 30)	179	Right	Right-arm medium	Titans	8
1	Hashim Amla (vc)	31 March 1983 (aged 31)	107	Right	Right-arm medium & off break	Cape Cobras	8
87	Kyle Abbott	18 June 1987 (aged 27)	11	Right	Right-arm fast-medium	Dolphins	4
28	Farhaan Behardien	9 October 1983 (aged 31)	21	Right	Right-arm fast-medium	Titans	4
12	Quinton de Kock (wk)	17 December 1992 (aged 22)	36	Left	None	Lions	8
18	Faf du Plessis	13 July 1984 (aged 30)	67	Right	Right-arm leg break	Titans	7
21	JP Duminy	14 April 1984 (aged 30)	134	Left	Right-arm off break	Cape Cobras	6
10	David Miller	10 June 1989 (aged 25)	63	Left	Right-arm off break	Dolphins	8
65	Morné Morkel	6 October 1984 (aged 30)	91	Left	Right-arm fast	Titans	8
94	Wayne Parnell	30 July 1989 (aged 25)	45	Left	Left-arm fast-medium	Warriors	1
69	Aaron Phangiso	21 January 1984 (aged 31)	14	Right	Slow left-arm orthodox	Lions	0
24	Vernon Philander	24 June 1985 (aged 29)	24	Right	Right-arm medium-fast	Cape Cobras	4
27	Rilee Rossouw	9 October 1989 (aged 25)	14	Left	Right-arm off break	Knights	5
8	Dale Steyn	27 June 1983 (aged 31)	96	Right	Right-arm fast	Cape Cobras	8
99	Imran Tahir	27 March 1979 (aged 35)	30	Right	Right-arm leg break	Dolphins	8

=== United Arab Emirates ===
United Arab Emirates (UAE) released their 15-man squad on 10 January 2015. On the same day, Mohammad Tauqir was named as captain, replacing Khurram Khan, making Tauqir the oldest World Cup captain. Khan was vice-captain for this tournament.

Coach: Aaqib Javed

No.	Player	Date of birth	ODIs	Batting	Bowling style	List A or Domestic team	CWC 15	Refs
2	Mohammad Tauqir (c)	14 January 1972 (aged 43)	5	Right	Right-arm off-break	None	6
11	Khurram Khan (vc)	21 June 1971 (aged 43)	10	Left	Slow left-arm orthodox	None	6
55	Fahad Al Hashmi	31 July 1982 (aged 32)	4	Right	Right-arm fast-medium	Rufi Properties Calicut Zamorins	1
77	Amjad Ali (wk)	25 September 1979 (aged 35)	9	Left	Right-arm legbreak	United Bank Limited	6
50	Shaiman Anwar	15 March 1979 (aged 35)	7	Right	Right-arm medium-fast	Thrissur Dynamites	6
8	Nasir Aziz	16 June 1986 (aged 28)	1	Right	Right-arm off-break	Alubond Tigers	2
70	Andri Berenger	29 August 1991 (aged 23)	4	Right	None	Danube Lions	6
36	Krishna Chandran	24 August 1984 (aged 30)	6	Right	Right-arm fast-medium	Dunes Cuisine Kannur Veerans	5
15	Manjula Guruge	14 February 1981 (aged 34)	3	Right	Left-arm fast-medium	NMC	4
47	Saqlain Haider (wk)	10 August 1987 (aged 27)	2	Left	None	United Bank Limited	1
27	Amjad Javed	5 July 1980 (aged 34)	3	Right	Right-arm medium	Dunes Cuisine Kannur Veerans	6
80	Rohan Mustafa	7 October 1988 (aged 26)	3	Left	Right-arm slow	Danube Lions	4
87	Mohammad Naveed	3 June 1987 (aged 27)	6	Right	Right-arm medium	None	6
7	Swapnil Patil (wk)	15 April 1985 (aged 29)	5	Right	None	Yogi Group	6
12	Kamran Shazad	15 April 1984 (aged 30)	0	Right	Right-arm medium	Al Fara'a CC	1

=== West Indies ===
West Indies announced their 15-man squad on 11 January 2015. Ex-captains Dwayne Bravo and Kieron Pollard were not included in the squad, having been dropped from the team before the South Africa series, Darren Sammy, who also missed that series, was included in the World Cup squad. Marlon Samuels was appointed as the vice-captain for the tournament.

Manager: Richie Richardson

No.	Player	Date of birth	ODIs	Batting	Bowling style	List A or Domestic team	CWC 15	Refs
98	Jason Holder (c)	5 November 1991 (aged 23)	26	Right	Right-arm medium-fast	Barbados	7
7	Marlon Samuels (vc)	5 February 1981 (aged 34)	167	Right	Right-arm off-break	Jamaica	7
62	Sulieman Benn	22 July 1981 (aged 33)	31	Left	Slow left-arm orthodox	Barbados	3
13	Darren Bravo^{2} (withdrawn)	6 February 1989 (aged 26)	79	Left	Right-arm medium-fast	Trinidad and Tobago	2
78	Jonathan Carter	16 November 1987 (aged 27)	5	Left	Right-arm medium	Barbados	5
25	Johnson Charles^{2}	14 January 1989 (aged 26)	30	Right	None	Windward Islands	2
19	Sheldon Cottrell	19 August 1989 (aged 25)	2	Right	Left-arm fast-medium	Jamaica	0
45	Chris Gayle	21 September 1979 (aged 35)	263	Left	Right-arm off-break	Jamaica	6
33	Nikita Miller^{1}	5 June 1982 (aged 32)	45	Right	Slow left-arm orthodox	Jamaica	1
74	Sunil Narine^{1} (withdrawn)	26 May 1988 (aged 26)	52	Left	Right-arm off-break	Trinidad and Tobago	0
80	Denesh Ramdin (wk)	13 March 1985 (aged 29)	120	Right	None	Trinidad and Tobago	7
24	Kemar Roach	30 June 1988 (aged 26)	64	Right	Right-arm fast	Barbados	3
12	Andre Russell	29 April 1988 (aged 26)	43	Right	Right-arm fast	Jamaica	7
88	Darren Sammy	20 December 1983 (aged 31)	119	Right	Right-arm medium-fast	Windward Islands	7
54	Lendl Simmons	25 January 1985 (aged 30)	61	Right	Right-arm medium-fast	Trinidad and Tobago	7
50	Dwayne Smith	12 April 1983 (aged 31)	99	Right	Right-arm medium	Barbados	6
75	Jerome Taylor	22 June 1984 (aged 30)	72	Right	Right-arm fast	Jamaica	7

^{1} Narine withdrew from the squad on 27 January, citing confidence problems with his new bowling action. On 29 January, Nikita Miller was named as a replacement.
^{2} Darren Bravo was ruled out with a hamstring injury on 27 February. He was replaced by Johnson Charles.

=== Zimbabwe ===
Zimbabwe named their 15-man squad on 7 January 2015; they had previously named a 30-man provisional squad. Captain Elton Chigumbura did not play the last 2 games due to a muscle tear; Brendan Taylor captained the team for these matches.

Coach: Dav Whatmore

No.	Player	Date of birth	ODIs	Batting	Bowling style	List A or Domestic team	CWC 15	Refs
47	Elton Chigumbura (c)	14 March 1986 (aged 28)	169	Right	Right-arm medium-fast	Mashonaland Eagles	4
1	Brendan Taylor (vc & wk)	6 February 1986 (aged 29)	161	Right	Right-arm off break	Mid West Rhinos	6
5	Regis Chakabva (wk)	20 September 1987 (aged 27)	24	Right	Right-arm off break	Mashonaland Eagles	4
13	Tendai Chatara	28 February 1991 (aged 23)	21	Right	Right-arm fast-medium	Mountaineers	6
33	Chamu Chibhabha	6 September 1986 (aged 28)	63	Right	Right-arm medium	Mashonaland Eagles	4
77	Craig Ervine	19 August 1985 (aged 29)	25	Left	Right-arm off break	Matabeleland Tuskers	6
98	Tafadzwa Kamungozi	8 June 1987 (aged 27)	11	Right	Right-arm leg break	Mid West Rhinos	3
3	Hamilton Masakadza	9 August 1983 (aged 31)	144	Right	Right-arm medium	Mountaineers	6
45	Stuart Matsikenyeri	3 May 1983 (aged 31)	112	Right	Right-arm off break	Mountaineers	1
25	Solomon Mire	21 August 1989 (aged 25)	5	Right	Right-arm medium-fast	Mid West Rhinos	5
53	Tawanda Mupariwa	16 April 1985 (aged 29)	35	Right	Right-arm fast-medium	Matabeleland Tuskers	3
48	Tinashe Panyangara	21 August 1985 (aged 29)	38	Right	Right-arm fast-medium	Mid West Rhinos	6
24	Sikandar Raza	24 April 1986 (aged 28)	21	Right	Right-arm medium & off break	Mashonaland Eagles	6
52	Prosper Utseya	26 March 1985 (aged 29)	160	Right	Right-arm off break (Note: Utseya was banned from bowling off breaks, but was allowed to bowl other deliveries.)	Mashonaland Eagles	0
14	Sean Williams	26 September 1986 (aged 28)	69	Left	Slow left-arm orthodox	Matabeleland Tuskers	6

== Statistics ==
=== ODI caps ===
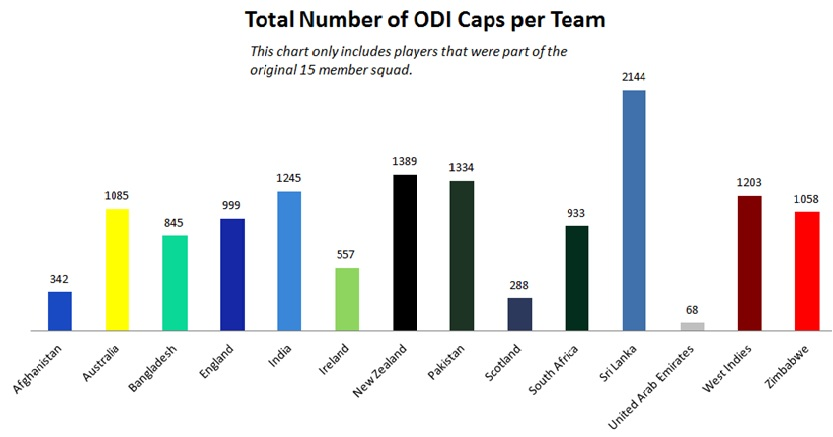
This chart shows the total number of One Day International (ODI) caps for each team competing in the 2015 ICC Cricket World Cup. The totals only include those who were in the original 15 member squad submitted to the International Cricket Council (ICC) on 7 January 2015, and include all appearances in ODIs until 14 February 2015, the first day of the World Cup.

Fewest caps (Note: The table only includes those who were in the original 15 member squad submitted to the International Cricket Council (ICC) on 7 January 2015. The caps include all appearances in ODIs until 14 February 2015, the first day of the world cup.)		Most caps	
(United Arab Emirates) Kamran Shazad	0	(Sri Lanka) Mahela Jayawardene	441
(United Arab Emirates) Nasir Aziz	1	(Sri Lanka) Kumar Sangakkara	397
(Sri Lanka) Dushmantha Chameera	1	(Pakistan) Shahid Afridi	391
(Ireland) Peter Chase	1	(Sri Lanka) Tillakaratne Dilshan	307
(Bangladesh) Taijul Islam	1	(New Zealand) Daniel Vettori	286
(Bangladesh) Soumya Sarkar	1		
(Pakistan) Yasir Shah	1		

=== Age ===
Youngest		Oldest	
Usman Ghani	18 years, 86 days	Khurram Khan	43 years, 238 days
Taskin Ahmed	19 years, 317 days	Mohammad Tauqir	43 years, 31 days
Nasir Jamal	21 years, 55 days	Misbah-ul-Haq	40 years, 262 days
Peter Chase	21 years, 128 days	Tillakaratne Dilshan	38 years, 123 days
Afsar Zazai	21 years, 188 days	Mahela Jayawardene	37 years, 263 days
