= Mohammad Atif =

Emirati cricketer

Personal information
- Full name: Mohammad Atif Ali
- Born: 12 September 1982 (age 44); Sharjah, United Arab Emirates
- Batting: Right-handed
- Bowling: Right-arm leg-spin

International information
- National side: United Arab Emirates (1997–2005)
- Source: CricketArchive, 11 March 2016

Mohammad Atif Ali (born 12 September 1982) is a former international cricketer who represented the United Arab Emirates national team between 1997 and 2005. He played as a right-handed batsman and right-arm leg-spin bowler.

== Biography ==
Born in Sharjah, Atif made his international debut for the UAE at the age of 14, in the 1997 ICC Trophy in Malaysia. He appeared in six of his team's seven matches, but had little success, taking only three wickets (with a best of 2/31 against Argentina). At the 2001 ICC Trophy in Canada, Atif featured in six of the UAE's ten games, but played little part. He was not given the opportunity to bowl, and batted only three times, with his highest score, 18, coming against the Netherlands. Atif's next major tournament for the UAE was the 2002 ACC Trophy in Singapore, where he played in five matches, including the final, in which the UAE defeated Nepal. Against Kuwait, he scored 49 runs, and featured in a 134-run partnership with Khurram Khan. In November 2004, Atif was called up to the UAE squad for an Intercontinental Cup game against Canada, which held first-class status. He played his final match for the UAE early the following year, against England A.
