= Bhudia (surname) =

Bhudia is a surname. Notable people with the surname include:

- Amit Bhudia (born 1980), Kenyan cricketer
- Rajesh Bhudia (born 1984), Kenyan cricketer
- Sachin Bhudia (born 1998), Kenyan cricketer
