= Ausaf Ali =

Emirati cricketer (born 1982)

Personal information
- Full name: Mohammad Ausaf Ali
- Born: 11 May 1982 (age 44); Sharjah, United Arab Emirates
- Batting: Right-handed
- Bowling: Right-arm off-spin

International information
- National side: United Arab Emirates (1998–2007)
- Source: CricketArchive, 11 March 2016

Mohammad Ausaf Ali (born 11 May 1982) is a former international cricketer who represented the United Arab Emirates national team between 1998 and 2007. He played as a right-handed batsman and right-arm off-spin bowler.

Born in Sharjah, Ali made his senior debut for the UAE at the age of 16, playing a single match against Japan at the 1998 ACC Trophy in Nepal. His next appearances for the team came at the 2001 ICC Trophy in Canada, where he played in seven of the UAE's ten matches. He had little success, however, taking only two wickets. At the 2002 ACC Trophy in Singapore, which the UAE won, Ali again had little part to play, going wicketless from his four matches. Despite this, in 2004, he was selected for an Intercontinental Cup game against Nepal, which held first-class status. In the match, he did not bat, and bowled a total of nine overs without taking a wicket. Ali's last appearances for the UAE came during the 2006–07 edition of the ACC Premier League, against Nepal and Malaysia.
