= Abdullah Hanif =

Emirati cricketer

Personal information
- Born: 17 September 1982 (age 44); United Arab Emirates
- Batting: Left-handed
- Bowling: Right-arm medium-fast

International information
- National side: United Arab Emirates (2004)
- Source: CricketArchive, 11 March 2016

Abdullah Hanif (born 17 September 1982) is a former international cricketer who represented the United Arab Emirates national team in the 2004 ICC Intercontinental Cup. He played as an all-rounder, batting left-handed and bowling right-arm medium pace.

Hanif represented the UAE Under-19s at the 2001 Youth Asia Cup in Nepal. He served as vice-captain to Mohammad Usman. In March 2004, Hanif was selected in the UAE senior team for an Intercontinental Cup game against Nepal, which was the country's inaugural first-class match. In the game, played at the Sharjah Cricket Association Stadium, he batted third in each innings, scoring 12 runs in the first and nine in the second. He also bowled first-change in Nepal's first innings (behind Ali Asad and Asim Saeed), but was only called upon for two overs.
