= David Gibbs =

David Gibbs may refer to:

- David Gibbs (American football) (born 1968), American football coach and player
- David Gibbs (businessman), American CEO of Yum! Brands, Inc.
- David Gibbs (cricketer) (born 1967), Bermudian cricketer
- David Gibbs (New Zealand military officer) (1883–1946), commanding officer in the Occupation of German Samoa
- Dave Gibbs (musician) (born 1965), American singer-songwriter
- David Gibbs (naturalist) (born 1958), British naturalist
- David Gibbs (politician) (1936–2013), member of the Mississippi House of Representatives
- David Parker Gibbs (1911–1987), United States Army general

== See also ==
- David Gibb (disambiguation)
