= Bikash Dali =

Nepalese cricketer

Personal information
- Full name: Bikash Lal Dali
- Born: 9 November 1980 (age 46); Nepal
- Batting: Right-handed
- Role: Batsman

Career statistics
| Competition | First-class |
|---|---|
| Matches | 1 |
| Runs scored | 7 |
| Batting average | 7.00 |
| 100s/50s | 0/0 |
| Top score | 5 |
| Catches/stumpings | 0/0 |
- Source: CricketArchive, 8 March 2008

Bikash Lal Dali (Nepali: बिकास दली) (born 9 November 1980) is a Nepalese cricketer. He made his first-class debut in the only first-class cricket match for Nepal against Malaysia in the 2004 ICC Intercontinental Cup scoring 5 runs in the first innings and unbeaten 2 runs in the second innings.
