= Sanjam Regmi =

Nepalese cricketer

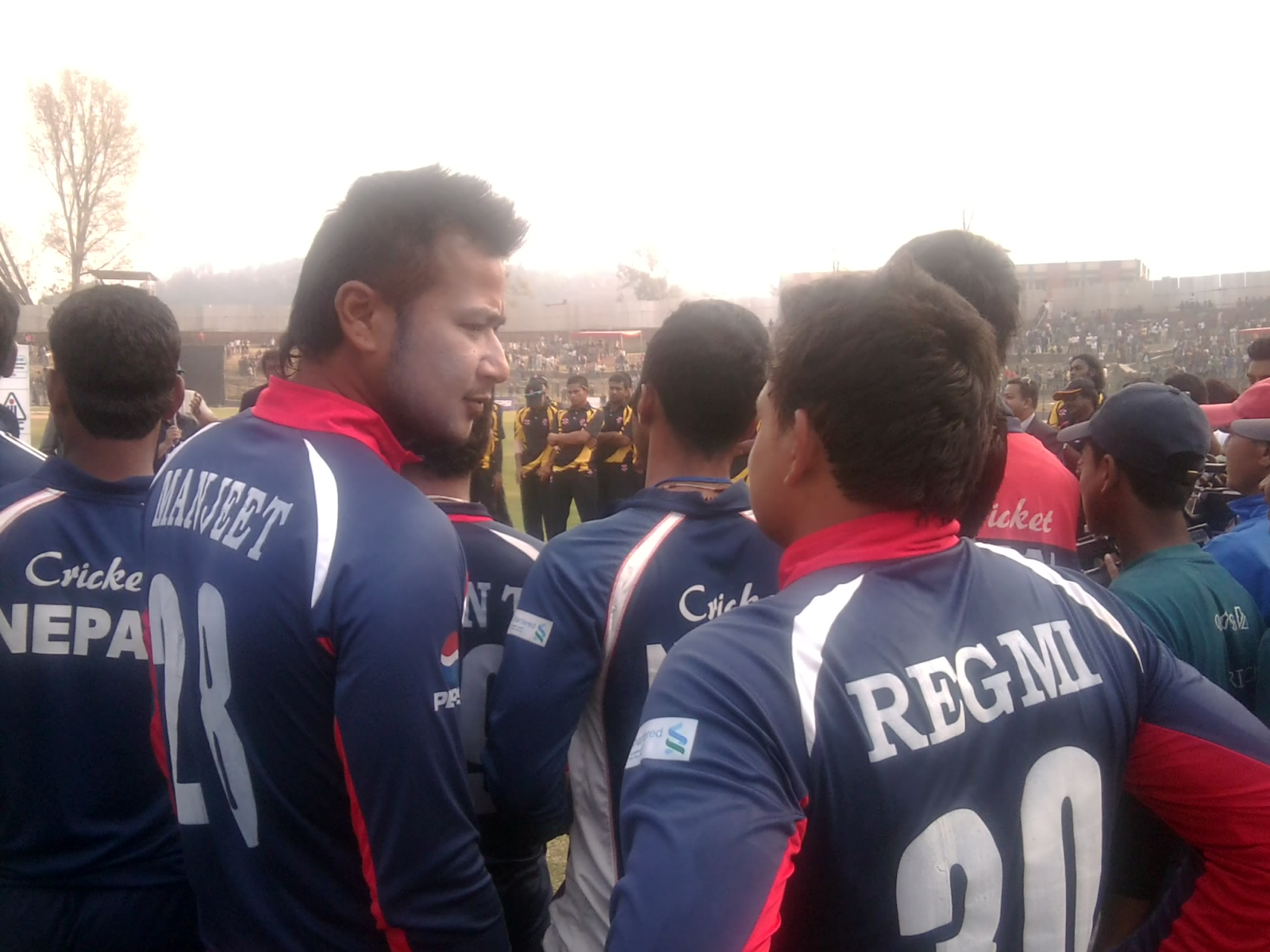
- Regmi (right) in 2013

Personal information
- Born: 22 December 1982 (age 43); Nepal
- Batting: Right-handed
- Bowling: Right-arm off break
- Role: Bowler

International information
- National side: Nepal

Domestic team information
- Years: Team
- 2014–2014: Colors X-Factors
- 2011–2015: APF

Career statistics
Competition	First-class	Twenty20
Matches	2	9
Runs scored	13	5
Batting average	13.00	–
100s/50s	0/0	0/0
Top score	8*	5*
Balls bowled	432	180
Wickets	7	4
Bowling average	24.71	49.00
5 wickets in innings	0	0
10 wickets in match	0	0
Best bowling	3/25	2/18
Catches/stumpings	0/–	0/–
- Source: CricketArchive, 8 March 2015

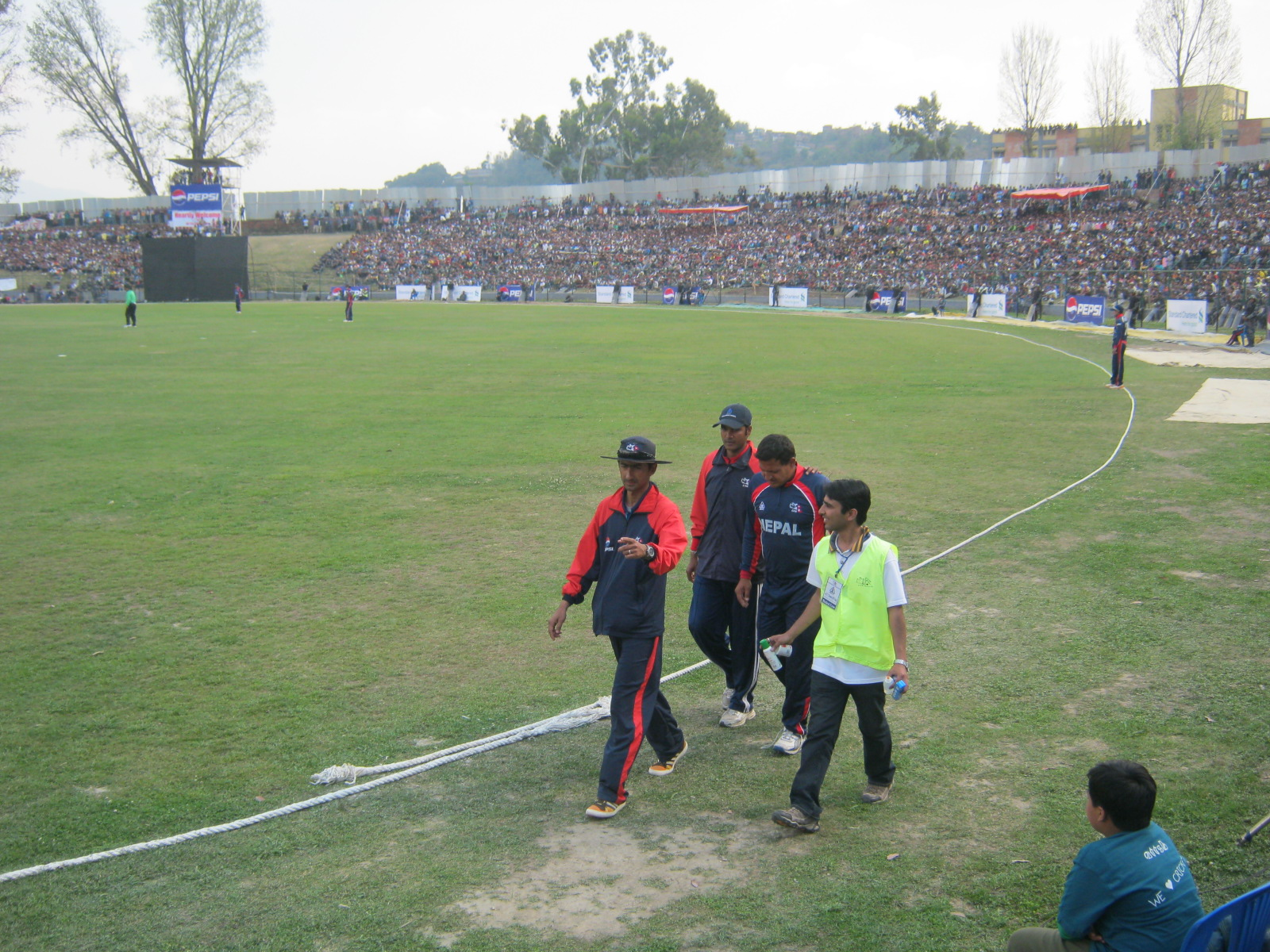
Sanjam Regmi returning from field after being injured during 2013 ACC Twenty20 Cup.

Sanjam Regmi (born 22 December 1982) is a Nepalese cricketer. He is a right-handed batsman and a right-arm off break bowler. He made his debut for Nepal against Germany in July 2001.

He represents the Colors X-Factors of the Nepal Premier League and APF Club of the National League.

== Playing career ==
Born in Kalaiya in 1982, Sanjam Regmi first played for Nepal in 2001 when he played against Germany in the 2001 ICC Trophy in Ontario. The following year, he played in the Under-19 World Cup in New Zealand, returning to the senior side for that year's ACC Trophy in Singapore.

He made his first-class début when he played for Nepal in the 2004 ICC Intercontinental Cup against the UAE and Malaysia. He also played ACC Fast Track Countries Tournament matches against Singapore, the UAE and Hong Kong that year before playing in the repêchage tournament of the 2005 ICC Trophy in February 2005, in which Nepal finished third after beating Qatar in a play-off.

Following that tournament, he played an ACC Fast Track Countries Tournament match against Malaysia later that year. He most recently represented his country in the 2006 ACC Premier League tournament, playing in all four matches against Hong Kong, the UAE, Singapore and Malaysia.
