= Chris Smith (cricketer, born 1973) =

Australian born former Dutch cricketer (born 1973)

Personal information
- Full name: Christoper J. Smith
- Born: 15 January 1973 (age 53); Australia
- Batting: Right-handed

International information
- National side: Netherlands

Domestic team information
- Years: Team
- 2003: Netherlands

Career statistics
Competition	First-class	List A
Matches	1	6
Runs scored	14	128
Batting average	14.00	25.60
100s/50s	–/–	–/–
Top score	14	48
Balls bowled	–	–
Wickets	–	–
Bowling average	–	–
5 wickets in innings	–	–
10 wickets in match	–	–
Best bowling	–	–
Catches/stumpings	–/–	5/–
- Source: Cricinfo, 26 July 2011

Christopher J. Smith (born 15 January 1973) is an Australian born former Dutch cricketer. Smith was a right-handed batsman.

Smith made his List A debut for the Netherlands against Cornwall in the 1st round of the 2004 Cheltenham & Gloucester Trophy which was held in 2003. The remainder of his List A appearances for the Netherlands came in the 2004 ICC 6 Nations Challenge, with his final appearance in that competition coming against the United Arab Emirates. In total he played 6 List A matches, scoring 128 runs at an average of 25.60, with a high score of 48.

He made a single first-class appearance for the Netherlands against Scotland in the ICC Intercontinental Cup. In this match he batted once, scoring 14 runs in the first-innings, before being dismissed by Ryan Watson.
