= Kalpesh Patel (Kenyan cricketer) =

Kenyan cricketer (born 1985)

Personal information
- Full name: Kalpesh Ashok Patel
- Born: 18 July 1985 (age 41); Nairobi, Kenya
- Batting: Right-handed
- Bowling: Right-arm medium

International information
- National side: Kenya (2006)
- ODI debut (cap 32): 20 March 2006 v Bangladesh
- Last ODI: 23 March 2006 v Bangladesh

Career statistics
Competition	ODI	FC	LA
Matches	2	4	2
Runs scored	1	96	1
Batting average	1.00	19.20	1.00
100s/50s	0/0	0/0	0/0
Top score	1*	24*	1*
Balls bowled	30	327	30
Wickets	0	3	0
Bowling average	–	75.66	–
5 wickets in innings	–	0	–
10 wickets in match	–	0	–
Best bowling	–	1/58	–
Catches/stumpings	0/–	3/0	0/0
- Source: Cricinfo, 13 May 2017

Kalpesh Ashok Patel (born 18 July 1985) is a former Kenyan cricketer who played two One Day Internationals for the national side, although he had no success in either.

Patel's ODIs are the only List A games he played, but he appeared four times at first-class level. He took only three wickets, but did dismiss Scotland's Gavin Hamilton in both innings of a match during the 2004 ICC Intercontinental Cup.

Patel once promised to become a very good cricketer: Andy Moles watched him play at Under-19 level and compared his bowling style with that of Terry Alderman, although he felt that his future was probably more as a batting all-rounder. Moles also praised Patel's "superb" fielding.

He did not play any major cricket since 2006.
