= David Gibb =

David Gibb may refer to:

- David Gibb (musician) (born 1990), children's musician and songwriter
- David Gibb (mathematician) (1883–1946), Scottish mathematician and astronomer

== See also ==
- David Gibbs (disambiguation)
