= Kaif Ghaury =

Pakistani-born Emirati cricketer (born 1964)

Personal information
- Born: 13 March 1964 (age 62); Pakistan
- Batting: Left-handed
- Bowling: Slow left-arm orthodox

Career statistics
Competition	First-class
Matches	1
Runs scored	42
Batting average	21.00
100s/50s	0/0
Top score	36
Catches/stumpings	0/0
- Source: Cricinfo, 30 October 2017

Kaif Ghaury (born 13 March 1964) is a Pakistani-born cricketer who played for the United Arab Emirates national cricket team. He made his only first-class appearance in a match against Malaysia during the 2004 ICC Intercontinental Cup.
