= Raju Basnyat =

Nepalese cricketer

Personal information
- Born: 9 January 1980 (age 46); Nepal
- Batting: Left-handed
- Bowling: Leg spin
- Role: Bowler

Domestic team information
- Years: Team
- 2004–2010: Kathmandu

Career statistics
Competition	First-class
Matches	4
Runs scored	40
Batting average	20.00
100s/50s	0/0
Top score	23
Balls bowled	258
Wickets	5
Bowling average	22.00
5 wickets in innings	0
10 wickets in match	0
Best bowling	3/27
Catches/stumpings	0/0
- Source: CricketArchive, 8 March 2008

Raju Basnyat (also spelled as Raju Basnet) (born 9 January 1980) is a Nepalese cricketer. All-rounder Raju is a left-handed batsman and a leg spinner. He made his debut for Nepal against Bhutan in March 2003.

He represents the Region no. 3 Kathmandu of the National League.

== Playing career ==
Born in Nepal in 1980, Raju Basnyat first represented Nepal at Under-19 level when he played in the 2000 Under-19 World Cup in Sri Lanka. He made his début for the senior side in 2004 when he played against the UAE and Malaysia in the 2004 ICC Intercontinental Cup. He played ACC Fast Track Countries Tournament matches against the UAE and Hong Kong later in the year.

In 2005, he played ACC Fast Track Countries Tournament matches against Singapore, the UAE and Hong Kong. The matches against the UAE and Hong Kong also counted towards the 2005 ICC Intercontinental Cup and are his last first-class matches to date. In August 2006 he toured Pakistan with Nepal and played in the ACC Trophy in Malaysia, his most recent appearance for his country.
