= Raju Khadka =

Personal information
- Born: 11 September 1975 (age 51); Nepal
- Batting: Right-handed
- Bowling: Right-arm medium-fast
- Role: All-rounder

International information
- National side: Nepal

Domestic team information
- Years: Team
- 2002–2010: Bhairahawa

Career statistics
Competition	First-class
Matches	2
Runs scored	75
Batting average	25.00
100s/50s	0/1
Top score	67
Balls bowled	156
Wickets	3
Bowling average	18.66
5 wickets in innings	0
10 wickets in match	0
Best bowling	2/17
Catches/stumpings	1/–
- Source: CricketArchive, 28 July 2014

Raju Khadka (born 11 September 1975) is a former Nepalese cricketer. An all-rounder, Raju is a right-handed batsman and a right-arm medium-fast bowler. He made his debut for Nepal against Bangladesh in September 1996.

Khadka became the first Nepalese cricketer to score an international century, when he slammed an unbeaten 105 off just 50 balls against Bhutan during the 2003 ACC Emerging Nations Tournament in March 2003.

He represents the Region No. 4 Bhairahawa of the National League.

== Biography ==
Born in Nepal in 1975, Khadka first played for Nepal in the 1996 ACC Trophy, which was held in Malaysia. He played in the tournament again in 1998, 2000 and 2002, captaining the side to a runners-up slot in the latter tournament.

He made his first-class début in 2004, playing in the 2004 ICC Intercontinental Cup against the UAE and Malaysia. Later in the year, he played in the 2004 ACC Trophy in Kuala Lumpur and ACC Fast Track Countries Tournament matches against Singapore and the UAE. The match against the UAE was his last for Nepal.

== Coaching ==
Currently, Khadka serves as a game teacher at Little Flower School, Narayangarh, Chitwan and is the head coach of the Cricket Academy of Chitwan.
