= Amit Bhudia =

Kenyan cricketer

Personal information
- Full name: Amit K. P. Bhudia
- Born: 28 April 1980 (age 46); Mombasa, Coast Province, Kenya
- Batting: Right-handed
- Bowling: Right-arm medium

Career statistics
Competition	First-class
Matches	2
Runs scored	125
Batting average	31.25
100s/50s	–/1
Top score	79
Catches/stumpings	–/–
- Source: Cricinfo, 19 September 2021

Amit K. P. Bhudia (born 28 April 1980) is a Kenyan former first-class cricketer.

Bhudia was born at Mombasa in April 1980. He was part of the Kenya national under-19 cricket team squad that took in the 2000 Under-19 Cricket World Cup, playing in four Youth One Day Internationals during the tournament against the Pakistan, Nepal, Bangladesh and Namibia under-19 cricket teams. With the regular Kenyan side striking, Bhudia was selected in the Kenyan side to face Namibia in the Intercontinental Cup in October 2004, making his debut in first-class cricket. The following month he featured in the semi-final of the competition against Scotland, with Bhudia scoring 79 runs in the Kenyan second innings before being dismissed by Craig Wright. The match ended as a draw, with Scotland progressing having amassed more points in the match. Bhudia was rumoured to be in line for selection in Kenya's squad for their One Day International series against Zimbabwe in early 2009, but he was not selected due to a shoulder injury.
