= Sher Lama =

Nepali-born Hong Kong cricketer (born 1973)

Personal information
- Full name: Sher Bahadur Lama
- Born: 9 January 1973 (age 53); Nepal
- Batting: Right-handed
- Bowling: Right-arm medium

International information
- National side: Hong Kong
- Only ODI (cap 6): 16 July 2004 v Bangladesh

Career statistics
Competition	ODI	LA	ICC T
Matches	1	1	4
Runs scored	16	16	38
Batting average	–	–	19.00
100s/50s	0/0	0/0	0/0
Top score	16*	16*	19
Balls bowled	–	–	96
Wickets	–	–	0
Bowling average	–	–	–
5 wickets in innings	–	–	–
10 wickets in match	–	–	–
Best bowling	–	–	–
Catches/stumpings	0/–	0/–	0/–
- Source: CricketArchive, 22 January 2011

Sher Lama (born 9 January 1973) is a Nepali-born Hong Kong cricketer who has played one One Day International (ODI) and four ICC Trophy matches for Hong Kong. He became the first Nepal-born cricketer to play a One Day International when he debuted against Bangladesh in the 2004 Asia Cup. His only One Day International saw him hit 16 unbeaten runs against Bangladesh at the 2004 Asia Cup from number nine in the batting order, which was the second-highest score of the Hong Kong innings. However, it did not prevent him being left out of the second match against Pakistan. Lama also played four matches at the 2001 ICC Trophy, scoring 38 runs with the highest score of 19 (against United States) and bowling 16 overs without taking a wicket. He has also coached Hong Kong national women's team.
