= Suriaprakash Ganesan =

Malaysian cricketer (born 1982)

Personal information
- Born: 26 March 1982 (age 44); Malaysia
- Batting: Right-handed
- Source: CricketArchive, 6 January 2008

Suriaprakash Ganesan (born 26 March 1982) is a Malaysian cricketer. A right-handed batsman, he has played for the Malaysia national cricket team since 2002.

== Biography ==
Born in Malaysia in 1982, Ganesan made his debut for Malaysia in March 2002, playing one match in the annual Stan Nagaiah Trophy series against Singapore. He then played against Thailand and the Maldives in that year's ACC Trophy before his first appearance in the annual Saudara Cup match.

The following year, he played for Malaysia against the ECB National Academy and in the Stan Nagaiah Trophy series. He played twice for a Malaysia Cricket Association President's XI against England A in 2004, making his first-class debut the same year when he played against Nepal in the ICC Intercontinental Cup.

He then spent almost three years out of the Malaysian side before returning for an ACC Premier League match against the UAE in March 2007. He most recently represented his country in the 2007 Saudara Cup match.
