= Reginald Tucker =

Bermudian cricketer (born 1967)

Personal information
- Full name: Reginald Tucker
- Born: 22 October 1967 (age 59); Bermuda
- Batting: Right-handed

International information
- National side: Bermuda

Career statistics
Competition	First-class
Matches	1
Runs scored	10
Batting average	5.00
100s/50s	–/–
Top score	6
Balls bowled	–
Wickets	–
Bowling average	–
5 wickets in innings	–
10 wickets in match	–
Best bowling	–
Catches/stumpings	–/–
- Source: CricketArchive, 13 October 2011

Reginald Tucker (born 22 October 1967) is a Bermudian cricketer. He is a right-handed batsman. He has played one first-class match to date for Bermuda, against Canada in the 2004 Intercontinental Cup.
