= Haninder Dhillon =

Canadian cricket player

Cricket information
- Batting: Right-handed
- Bowling: Right-arm slow

Career statistics
Competition	ODI
Matches	2
Runs scored	14
Batting average	7.00
100s/50s	0/0
Top score	13
Catches/stumpings	0/–
- Source: , 19 April 2007

Haninder Dhillon (born 27 October 1976) is an Indian-born Canadian cricket player. He is a right-handed batsman and right-arm medium pace bowler. He made his debut for Canada on 28 May 2004 in an ICC Intercontinental Cup game against the USA in Florida. He has played five games in that tournament in total. He made his One Day International debut for Canada on 16 May 2006 against Zimbabwe in Trinidad, and has played two ODIs in total. He also represented Canada in the 2004 ICC Americas Championship and the 2005 ICC Trophy.
