= Suresh Sakadivan =

Malaysian cricketer (born 1981)

Personal information
- Born: 27 May 1981 (age 45); Malaysia
- Batting: Right-handed
- Role: Wicket-keeper
- Source: CricketArchive, 6 January 2007

Suresh Sakadivan is a Malaysian cricketer. A right-handed batsman and wicket-keeper, he has played for the Malaysia national cricket team since 1999.

== Biography ==
Born in Malaysia in 1981, Suresh Sakadivan first played for Malaysia in the Stan Nagaiah Trophy series against Singapore in March 1999. He played the series again in 2001, and played in the ACC Trophy in Singapore in July 2002. He played in the annual Saudara Cup match against Singapore for the first time the following month.

In 2003, he played for Malaysia against the ECB National Academy, also playing in the Stan Nagaiah Trophy and Saudara Cup against Singapore. The following year, he played for a Malaysia Cricket Association Invitation XI against England A and the Stan Nagaiah Trophy.

In April 2004, he made his first-class debut against Nepal in the ICC Intercontinental Cup. Following this match, it would be more than three years before his next international, returning to play in the ACC Twenty20 Cup in Kuwait in late 2007.
