= Kashif Khan =

United Arab Emirati cricketer (born 1965)

Personal information
- Born: 19 October 1965 (age 61); Lahore, Pakistan
- Batting: Right-handed
- Bowling: Right-arm medium, Right-arm offbreak
- Source: Cricinfo, 10 May 2019

Kashif Hussain Khan Tareen (born 19 October 1965) is a United Arab Emirati cricketer. He played First-class cricket and List A cricket for the United Arab Emirates national cricket team from 1989/90 to 2007 and from 1989/90 to 1993/94.
