= Mohammad Taskeen =

United Arab Emirati cricketer (born 1970)

Personal information
- Born: 1 October 1970 (age 56); Pakistan
- Batting: Right-handed
- Role: Wicketkeeper
- Source: Cricinfo, 10 May 2019

Mohammad Taskeen (born 1 October 1970) is a United Arab Emirati cricketer. He played First-class cricket for the United Arab Emirates national cricket team from 2004 to 2005.
