= Neil Rossouw =

Namibian cricketer (born 1976)

Personal information
- Born: 25 September 1976 (age 50); Keetmanshoop, South-West Africa
- Batting: Right-handed
- Bowling: Right-arm medium

International information
- National side: Namibia

Domestic team information
- Years: Team
- 2004/05–2011/12: Namibia

Career statistics
Competition	FC	LA	T20
Matches	2	3	11
Runs scored	49	16	62
Batting average	24.50	8.00	8.85
100s/50s	0/0	0/0	0/0
Top score	39	16*	18*
Balls bowled	–	45	6
Wickets	–	1	0
Bowling average	–	24.00	–
5 wickets in innings	–	0	–
10 wickets in match	–	0	–
Best bowling	–	1/21	–
Catches/stumpings	2/–	0/–	1/–
- Source: CricketArchive, 27 January 2025

Neil Rossouw (born 25 September 1976) is a Namibian former cricketer. He is a right-handed batsman and a right-arm medium-pace bowler who played first-class cricket, as well as playing for the Namibian team when Pakistan and New Zealand's A teams toured the country. However, he played his first match, for an Eastern Province XI nearly ten years previously, when Durham toured South Africa.

He also played in the Faithwear Inter-Provincial Competition of 2004.
