= Sebastiaan Gokke =

Dutch cricketer

Personal information
- Full name: Sebastiaan F. Gokke
- Born: 25 May 1978 (age 48); Schiedam, Netherlands
- Batting: Left-handed
- Bowling: Right-arm fast-medium

International information
- National side: Netherlands (1997–2005)
- Source: CricketArchive, 21 February 2016

Sebastiaan F. Gokke (born 25 May 1978) is a former Dutch international cricketer who represented the Dutch national side between 1997 and 2005. He played as a right-arm pace bowler.

Gokke was born in Schiedam, and played his club cricket for Excelsior '20. Having earlier appeared for the Netherlands under-19s, he made his senior national debut in July 1997, on a tour of England. Gokke's first major international tournament was the 2001 ICC Trophy in Canada, which the Netherlands won to qualify for the 2003 World Cup. He played in only three of his team's ten matches, but was quite successful, taking 3/15 against Singapore and 5/43 against United States. Gokke made his List A debut for the Netherlands in August 2003, playing against Cornwall in the C&G Trophy (an English competition). His first-class debut came in June 2004, in an Intercontinental Cup fixture against Scotland. Gokke made his final international appearance the following year, against the same team in the competition.
