= Dipendra Chaudhary =

Nepalese cricketer

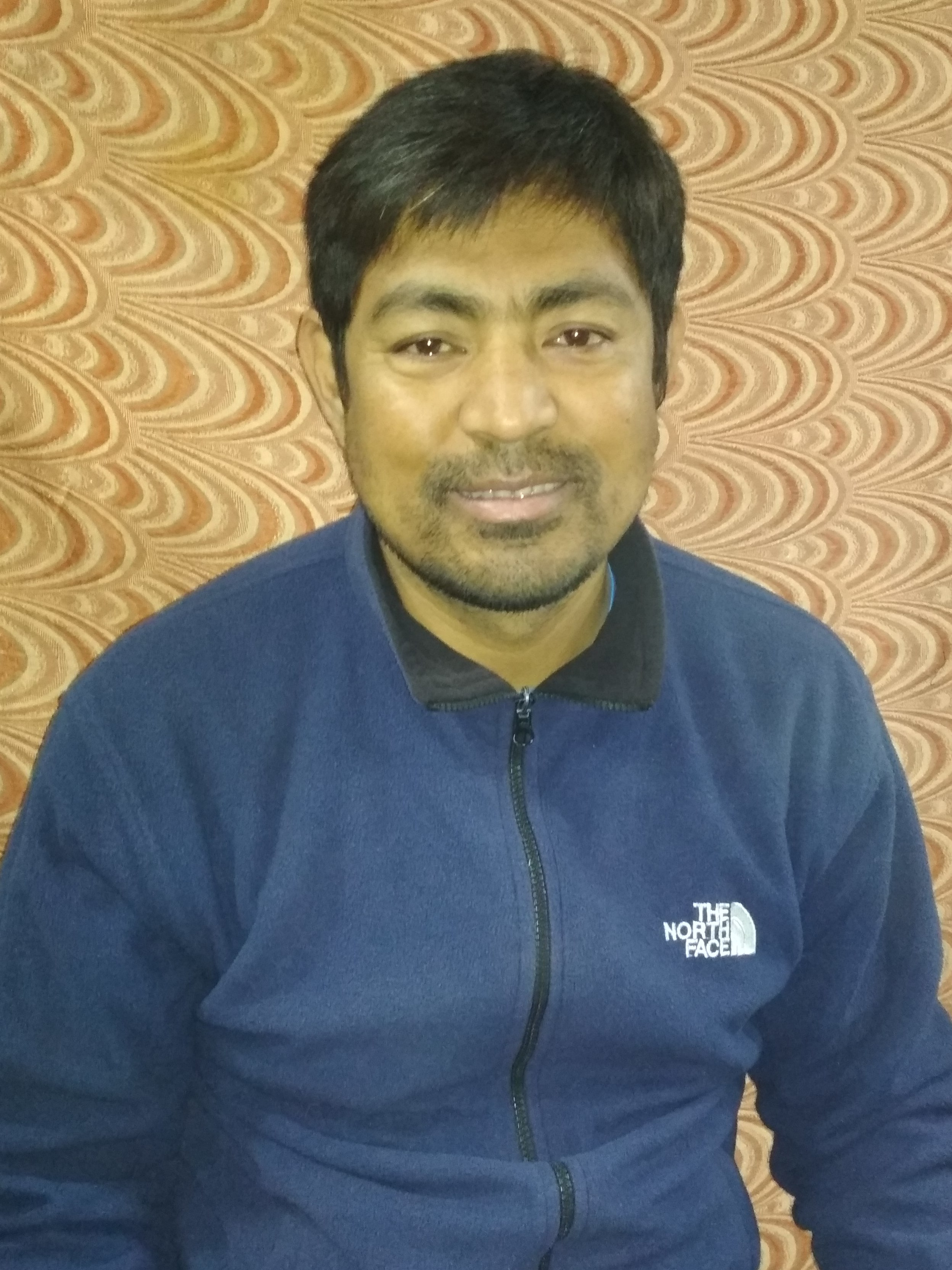
- Chaudhary in 2018

Personal information
- Born: 8 January 1980 (age 46); Banauli, Saptari, Nepal
- Batting: Right-handed
- Bowling: Right-arm medium

Domestic team information
- Years: Team
- 2011–2015: APF
- 2015: GoldenGate

Career statistics
Competition	FC
Matches	2
Runs scored	20
Batting average	5.00
100s/50s	0/0
Top score	9
Catches/stumpings	2/–
- Source: CricketArchive, 8 March 2015

Dipendra Chaudhary (born 8 January 1980) is a Nepalese cricketer. He is a right-handed batsman and right-arm medium pace bowler, He played for the Nepal national cricket team since 1998, including two first-class matches.

He has also played in an Under-19 World Cup for Nepal and in the ICC Trophy. He is the only Nepali to score a half-century in the latter tournament.

He represents the APF Club of the National League and GoldenGate International College, which plays in the SPA Cup. Recently in the PhillipsHughes tribute match he had played for NepalBlue.

== Playing career ==
Born in 1980, he first played for Nepal in the 1998 ACC Trophy in Nepal, playing against the UAE and Hong Kong. He played in the Under-19 World Cup in Sri Lanka in 2000 in which Nepal finished eighth. He returned to the senior team for that year's ACC Trophy in the United Arab Emirates, though he only played one match.

He played in three matches at the 2001 ICC Trophy in Ontario, scoring 52 in the match against Germany, which is Nepal's only half-century in the ICC Trophy. After playing in the 2002 ACC Trophy in Singapore he made his first-class debut in 2004 when he played against the UAE in the 2004 ICC Intercontinental Cup. He also played against them in the 2005 tournament.

In 2005 he played in the repêchage tournament of the 2005 ICC Trophy, in which Nepal finished third after beating Qatar in a play-off. He then spent some time away from the Nepal national team, returning for the 2007 ACC Twenty20 Cup in Kuwait, his most recent appearance for Nepal.
