= David Gibbs (cricketer) =

Bermudian cricketer (born 1967)

Personal information
- Born: 15 March 1967 (age 59); Jamaica

Career statistics
Competition	First-class
Matches	1
Runs scored	0
Batting average	0.00
100s/50s	0/0
Top score	0
Balls bowled	84
Wickets	1
Bowling average	57.00
5 wickets in innings	0
10 wickets in match	0
Best bowling	1/37
Catches/stumpings	2/–
- Source: CricketArchive, 13 October 2011

David Gibbs (born 15 March 1967) is a former Bermudian cricketer. He played just once for Bermuda, a first-class ICC Intercontinental Cup match against the USA in 2004.
