= Arshad Ali (cricketer) =

United Arab Emirates cricketer

Personal information
- Full name: Arshad Ali
- Born: 6 April 1976 (age 50); Sialkot, Pakistan
- Batting: Right-handed
- Bowling: Legbreak
- Relatives: Abdullah Shafique (nephew)

International information
- National side: United Arab Emirates (2001–2013)
- ODI debut (cap 19): 16 July 2004 v India
- Last ODI: 26 June 2008 v Sri Lanka

Career statistics
Competition	ODI
Matches	4
Runs scored	54
Batting average	13.50
100s/50s	0/0
Top score	41
Balls bowled	102
Wickets	1
Bowling average	105.00
5 wickets in innings	0
10 wickets in match	0
Best bowling	1/5
Catches/stumpings	1/–
- Source: Cricinfo, 17 July 2004

Arshad Ali (born 6 April 1976) is a Pakistani-born former cricketer who played for the United Arab Emirates national cricket team.

Ali was born in Sialkot, Pakistan. He was taught cricket by his brother Shafiq Ahmed, who moved to the UAE in 1991. Ali subsequently followed his brother to Dubai and excelled in local domestic cricket, winning an award as the Dubai Cricket Council's best junior player. He reportedly scored 35 centuries in six years in local tournaments through to 2001. His nephew and Shafiq's son is the Pakistan international Abdullah Shafique.

Ali represented the UAE at the 2001 ICC Trophy in Canada, notably scoring a century against Ireland. He was named man of the match in the final of the 2002 ACC Trophy after taking 4/24 against Nepal. He made his One Day International (ODI) debut for the UAE against India at the 2004 Asia Cup. He played three further ODIs, one more at the 2004 Asia Cup and two at the 2008 Asia Cup, with a highest score of 41 against Bangladesh in 2008.

In the opening match of the 2006 ACC Trophy, Ali scored 213 not out against Brunei to lead the UAE to a 367-run win. His highest score in first-class cricket was 185 against Bermuda in the 2007–08 ICC Intercontinental Cup. Only two weeks later, he took career-best List A figures of 7/41 against Denmark in 2007 ICC World Cricket League Division Two.

In 2010, Ali took 3/7 against the English county team Sussex in the final of the Emirates Airline Twenty20, leading the Emirates XI to an unlikely 14-run victory, defending a paltry total of 85. His final match for the UAE, against Canada, was during the ICC World Cricket League Championship in 2013.
