= Khurram Khan =

Emirati cricketer

Personal information
- Full name: Khurram Khan
- Born: 21 June 1971 (age 55); Multan, Punjab, Pakistan
- Batting: Left-handed
- Bowling: Slow left-arm orthodox
- Role: All-rounder

International information
- National side: United Arab Emirates (2004–2015)
- ODI debut (cap 23): 16 July 2004 v India
- Last ODI: 15 March 2015 v West Indies
- T20I debut (cap 6): 17 March 2014 v Netherlands
- Last T20I: 21 March 2014 v Zimbabwe

Career statistics
Competition	ODI	T20I	FC	LA
Matches	10	3	23	76
Runs scored	427	73	1,696	2,715
Batting average	53.37	24.33	44.63	46.01
100s/50s	1/3	0/0	4/10	5/23
Top score	132*	31	121*	138
Balls bowled	456	6	2,680	2,633
Wickets	12	1	34	80
Bowling average	31.66	8.00	31.91	24.91
5 wickets in innings	0	0	1	0
10 wickets in match	0	0	0	0
Best bowling	4/32	1/8	6/98	4/25
Catches/stumpings	5/–	2/–	22/–	26/–
- Source: CricketArchive, 4 September 2017

Khurram Khan (born 21 June 1971) is a Pakistani-born former cricketer who played for the United Arab Emirates national cricket team. In 2014, Khurram became the oldest player (then aged 43 years and 162 days) to score an ODI hundred as his unbeaten 132 helped his team to a six-wicket victory over Afghanistan in Dubai. He is regarded as the best cricketer to play for the United Arab Emirates.

== Career ==
Khan has been playing for the UAE since 2001 when he turned out for the team at the 2001 ICC Trophy in Canada, where he played ten games over the course of the two-week tournament. With 243 runs over eight innings, Khurram had the highest batting average of the UAE team with 60.75, though Ahmed Nadeem and Arshad Ali both made more runs. He also bowled the most for UAE, taking 19 wickets in his 95 overs, at a bowling average of 13.52 - taking joint third-most wickets of the tournament, behind Roland Lefebvre and Soren Vestergaard.

Despite Khurram's performances, the UAE finished fifth at the tournament, and failed to qualify for the 2003 World Cup. Khurram was named captain for the ICC Six Nations Challenge in March 2004, a qualifier tournament for the ICC Champions Trophy, and though Khurram was once again leading wicket-taker for the UAE, the team finished fifth on net run rate, coming last after four other teams on points.

Khurram was retained as captain for the 2004 Asia Cup, however, where the UAE took on the Test nations of India and Sri Lanka. They were eliminated after two group stage matches, though Cricinfo claimed that he and his teammates "bowled with plenty of discipline and control" in the first match against India, and "a maturity far beyond their experience" in the second match.

Khurram got one wicket in his first match, with the last ball of a ten-over spell, and took four for 32 in ten overs against Sri Lanka, including the top scorer of the innings Avishka Gunawardene who lofted a catch to the deep for 73. He was the leading bowler as Sri Lanka were bowled out for 239, but only contributed with eight runs in the chase as UAE were bowled out for 123 and knocked out of the tournament.

Khurram has played four matches at the ICC Intercontinental Cup, three in 2004 and one in 2005, scoring 329 runs with four fifties and taking eight wickets. He has not been the leading wicket-taker in that tournament, with Ali Asad outperforming him with 35 scalps in five matches.

Khurram was captain at the 2005 ICC Trophy, leading his team to a fifth place play-off where the winner would qualify for the 2007 World Cup. After bowling eight overs without a wicket at the Dutch batsmen, Khurram was dismissed for six in the UAE's total of 142, and the UAE lost by 143 runs to miss out on a World Cup berth. Three months later, Khurram had to declare himself unavailable for the semi-final of the 2005 Intercontinental Cup, with Arshad Ali captaining the team in his place.

He scored his only ODI century of 132* against Afghanistan. With this century, he became the oldest ever player to score an ODI century at the age of 43, passing Sri Lanka's Sanath Jayasuriya, who scored his final century when he was at 39 years of age.

In June 2015, following the UAE's defeat to Ireland in the 2015–17 ICC Intercontinental Cup, Khurram announced his retirement from international cricket.

== Awards ==
- 2015 ICC Associate Player of the Year
