= Ali Asad (cricketer, born 1976) =

Emirati cricketer (born 1976)

Ali Asad Abbas
Personal information
- Born: 6 December 1976 (age 49); Lahore, Pakistan
- Height: 6 ft 5 in (196 cm)
- Batting: Right-handed
- Bowling: Right-arm fast-medium

Career statistics
Competition	ODI	FC	LA
Matches	2	7	19
Runs scored	21	123	113
Batting average	21.00	13.66	12.55
100s/50s	0/0	0/0	0/0
Top score	12	29	28
Balls bowled	120	1,506	927
Wickets	2	38	26
Bowling average	36.50	20.36	21.76
5 wickets in innings	0	2	0
10 wickets in match	0	1	0
Best bowling	2/35	9/74	3/30
Catches/stumpings	0/0	5/0	2/0
- Source: Cricinfo, 13 March 2019

Ali Asad Abbas (Urdu: علی اسد عباس), (born 6 December 1976) is a Pakistani-born former cricketer who played for the United Arab Emirates national cricket team in 2 One Day Internationals.

== Cricket career ==
In Pakistan, he represented Pakistan A team in 1995-96 but couldn't break into the national team. As a UAE bowler, he produced the country's best international figures with 9 wickets vs Nepal (May 2004) and once trapped Sanath Jayasuriya lbw at the Asia Cup 2004.

== Coaching career ==
In 2018, he launched a “Speed Hunt” talent-ID programme in Ajman (July 20, 4pm), backed by Mohammad Tauqir (then UAE selector), offering a Dh500 prize and a trophy for the fastest bowler, no age limit, and follow-on fast-bowler camps via his Ali Cricket Training Centre (ACTC).
