= Mohammad Tauqir =

Emirati cricketer (born 1972)

Personal information
- Full name: Mohammad Tauqir Khan
- Born: 14 January 1972 (age 54); Dubai, United Arab Emirates
- Batting: Right-handed
- Bowling: Right-arm off break

Career statistics
Competition	ODIs
Matches	2
Runs scored	61
Batting average	30.50
100s/50s	0/1
Top score	55
Balls bowled	120
Wickets	1
Bowling average	80.00
5 wickets in innings	0
10 wickets in match	0
Best bowling	1/46
Catches/stumpings	1/–
- Source: ESPNcricinfo, 29 April 2007

Mohammad Tauqir (Arabic: توقير محمد; born 14 January 1972) is an Emirati cricketer. He is a UAE national. He is a lower order batsman and off-spin bowler, he played his first game for UAE in the final of 1996 ACC Trophy (batting at 11 and not bowling). He has been part of the UAE team in the last three ICC Trophy and last six ACC Trophy tournaments. His best bowling performance came against Japan with 6–10 off 10 overs in the 2000 ACC Trophy.

His two One Day Internationals came when UAE played in the 2004 Asia Cup they lost by 116 runs to both India and Sri Lanka, Tauqir scored 55 against India. In 2004 he also played in the Hong Kong International Cricket Sixes. He made his Twenty20 International debut against Scotland in the 2015 ICC World Twenty20 Qualifier tournament on 9 July 2015.

Mohammad Tauqir also set the record for the oldest captain on captaincy debut in T20I history. He made his T20I debut as a captain at the age of 43, becoming the second oldest player to make his T20I debut behind Ryan Campbell of Hong Kong.
