= List of United Arab Emirates–related topics =

This is a list of topics related to the United Arab Emirates. Those interested in the subject can monitor changes to the pages by clicking on Related changes in the sidebar.

== Buildings and structures ==
- Al Dhafra Air Base
- BurJuman
- Grand Mosque
- Gulf Research Centre
- House of Poetry
- Jumeirah Islands
- List of shopping malls in the United Arab Emirates
- Qasr al-Hosn
- The Marina Torch
- List of universities in the United Arab Emirates

=== Airports ===
- Abu Dhabi International Airport
- Al Ain International Airport
- Dubai International Airport
- Al Maktoum International Airport
- Sharjah International Airport
- Ras Al Khaimah International Airport

=== Amusement parks ===
- Dubailand
- Falconcity of Wonders

=== Archaeological sites ===
- Abu Dhabi Islands Archaeological Survey
- Khor Fakkan
- Marawah
- Mileiha
- Sir Bani Yas

=== Bridges ===
- Al Garhoud Bridge
- Al Maktoum Bridge
- Al Maqta'a Bridge
- Al Shindagha Tunnel
- Floating Bridge
- Ras al Khaimah Bridge

=== Buildings and structures in Dubai ===
- Al Barsha Third
- American University in Dubai
- Dubai Healthcare City
- Dubai International Airport
- Dubai International Convention Centre
- Dubai Internet City
- Dubai Knowledge Village
- Dubai Mall
- Dubai Marina
- Dubai Media City
- Dubai Pearl
- Mall of the Emirates
- Palm Jumeirah
- Ski Dubai
- Burj Al Arab
- Burj Khalifa
- Mall of the Emirates
- Ibn Battuta Mall
- Palm Jebel Ali
- World Islands
- Deira Islands
- University of Wollongong in Dubai
- Middlesex University Dubai
- Wild Wadi Water Park

==== Projects by Al Nakheel ====
- Dubai Waterfront
- Ibn Battuta Mall
- Jumeirah Bay
- Jumeirah Islands
- Lake Shore Towers
- Palm Islands
- Palm Jumeirah
- The World (archipelago)

==== Proposed buildings and structures in Dubai ====
- Al Burj
- Palm Deira
- Almas Tower
- Armada Towers
- Bawadi
- Burj Al Alam
- Dubai Land
- Dubai Waterfront
- Dubai World Central
- Dubai World Central International Airport
- Emirates Hotel
- Falconcity of Wonders
- Jumeirah Bay
- Jumeirah Lake Towers
- Lake Shore Towers
- Mag 218 Tower
- Mall of Arabia (Dubai)
- One Business Bay
- Rose Rotana Suites
- The World (archipelago)
- Wind Towers

==== Skyscrapers in Dubai ====
- Burj Khalifa
- 21st Century Tower
- 23 Marina
- Ahmed Abdul Rahim Al Attar Tower
- Almas Tower
- Burj Dubai Lake Hotel & Serviced Apartments
- Burj al-Arab
- Chelsea Tower
- Dubai World Trade Centre
- Emirates Office Tower
- Emirates Towers
- Infinity Tower
- Jumeirah Emirates Towers Hotel
- Mag 218 Tower
- Rose Rotana Suites
- The Tower (Dubai)
- The One Tower

=== Hospitals ===
- List of hospitals in the United Arab Emirates
- Dr. Sulaiman Al-Habib Medical Center
- New Medical Center

=== Hotels ===
- Burj al-Arab
- Emirates Palace
- Grand Hyatt Dubai
- Jumeirah Emirates Towers Hotel
- Jumeirah International Group
- Rose Rotana Suites
- Shangri-La Hotel, Dubai
- InterContinental Hotels Group Dubai Festival City

=== Shopping malls ===
- Abu Dhabi Mall
- BurJuman
- The Dubai Mall
- Ibn Battuta Mall
- List of shopping malls in the United Arab Emirates
- Mall of Arabia (Dubai)
- Mall of the Emirates
- Marina Mall, Abu Dhabi
- Wafi
- Deira City Centre
- Mirdif City Centre

=== Skyscrapers ===
- Silver Tower (Abu Dhabi)
- Sky Tower Dubai

=== Sports venues ===
- Sheikh Zayed Stadium

==== Cricket grounds ====
- Sharjah Cricket Stadium
- Sheikh Zayed Cricket Stadium

==== Football venues ====
- Al Emirate Club Stadium
- Al Jazira Mohammed Bin Zayed Stadium
- Jeque Zayed Stadium
- Khalid Bin Mohammed Stadium
- Al-Maktoum Stadium
- Al-Nahyan Stadium
- Al-Rashid Stadium
- Sharjah Stadium (football)
- Sheikh Khalifa International Stadium
- Tahnoun Bin Mohamed Stadium

==== Rugby union stadiums in Dubai ====
- Dubai Exiles Rugby Ground

== Cities ==
- List of cities in the United Arab Emirates
- Abu Dhabi
- Dubai
- Sharjah
- Ajmān (city)
- Fujairah
- Umm al-Quwain
- Ras al-Khaimah

=== Dubai ===
- Dubai
- 7DAYS
- Al Garhoud bridge
- Al Karama, Dubai
- Business Bay
- Crystal Tower
- Dubai Airshow
- Dubai American Academy
- Dubai Desert Classic
- Dubai Drydocks
- Dubai Festival City
- Dubai Healthcare City
- Dubai International Financial Center
- Dubai International Holy Quran Award
- Dubai Internet City
- Dubai Investment Group
- Dubai Mall
- Dubai Media Incorporated
- Dubai Police Force
- Dubai Ports World
- Dubai Shopping Festival
- Dubai Silicon Oasis
- Dubai Summer Surprises
- Dubai Science Park
- Family tree of the Al Maktoum rulers
- Gulf News
- Gulf Research Center
- Jebel Ali Free Zone
- Jumeirah
- Jumeirah International Group
- Khaleej Times
- List of fish on stamps of Dubai
- List of rulers of separate Emirates of the United Arab Emirates
- List of shopping malls in the United Arab Emirates
- List of shopping malls in Dubai
- Mushrif Park
- My Vision - Challenges in the Race for Excellence
- Satwa, Dubai
- Suna pur
- Tourism in Dubai

==== Universities and colleges in Dubai ====
- Birla Institute of Technology and Science

== Communications ==
- Communications in the United Arab Emirates
- .ae
- Du (telco)
- Etisalat
- Postage stamps and postal history of Sharjah

=== Telecommunications companies ===
- Du (telco)
- Etisalat
- Warid Telecom

== Culture ==
- Abra (boat)
- Bukhoor
- Emblem of the United Arab Emirates
- Flag of the United Arab Emirates
- Mabkhara
- Tahiat Alalam
- Yowlah

=== Languages ===
- Gulf Arabic
- Shihhi Arabic
- English
- Urdu
- German
- Malayalam
- Hindi
- Tamil
- Telugu

=== Music ===
- Music of the United Arab Emirates
- Sandwash

== Economy of the United Arab Emirates ==
- Economy of the United Arab Emirates
- Abu Dhabi Investment Authority
- Abu Dhabi Securities Market
- Emiratisation
- Jebel Ali Free Zone
- My Vision - Challenges in the Race for Excellence
- The national sukuk program (UAE)
- United Arab Emirates dirham

=== Companies ===
- ADNOC
- Al-Ghurair Group
- Aldar Properties
- Ashai Group International
- Borouge
- Du (telco)
- Dubai Aerospace Enterprise
- Dubai International Capital
- Dubai Ports World
- Etisalat
- I-mate
- Warid Telecom

==== Public Relations companies ====
- Strawberry Public Relations
- The Guild

==== Web Development companies ====
- OnLime Middle East
- H2O Web Development Dubai
- Strategy Marketing Web Development Companies

==== Investment & Consulting companies ====
- ADS Securities
- ASCALA Capital and Consulting
- Emirates Investment & Development PSC (Dubai)

==== Media companies of the United Arab Emirates ====
- AMEInfo

==== Entertainment companies of the United Arab Emirates ====
- Lime Green Entertainments

=== Ports and harbours of the United Arab Emirates ===
- Hamriyah (Sharjah)
- Jebel Ali
- Port Rashid
- Mina' Zayid

== Education in the United Arab Emirates ==
=== Schools in the United Arab Emirates ===
- Abu Dhabi Indian School
- American International School - Abu Dhabi
- American School of Dubai
- Dubai American Academy
- Dubai British School
- Dubai College
- Dubai English Speaking College
- Dubai Modern High School
- English College Dubai
- International School of Choueifat
- Our Own English High School
- Sharjah American International School
- St.Joseph's School
- Tamkeen
- Al Yasmina School
- Pearl Primary School
- Giggles English School
- Emirates National School
- Delhi Private School, Sharjah
- Delhi Private School, Dubai
- DPS Academy

=== Universities and colleges in the United Arab Emirates ===
- Abu Dhabi Men's College
- Abu Dhabi Women's College
- Ajman University of Science and Technology
- Al Ain Men's College
- Al Ain Women's College
- American University of Asia
- CERT Group of Companies
- American University in Dubai
- Dubai Medical College for Girls
- Dubai Men's College
- Dubai Women's College
- Etisalat University College
- Fujairah Men's College
- Fujairah Women's College
- Al Ghurair University
- Heriot-Watt University Dubai
- Higher Colleges of Technology
- Ittihad University
- Ras Al Khaimah Men's College
- Ras Al Khaimah Women's College
- American University of Sharjah
- Sharjah Men's College
- Sharjah Women's College
- Syscoms College
- The British University in Dubai
- United Arab Emirates University
- University of Wollongong in Dubai
- Zayed University

== Emirates of the United Arab Emirates ==
- Emirates of the United Arab Emirates
- Abu Dhabi
- Ajmān
- Dubai
- Fujairah
- Ras al-Khaimah
- Sharjah
- Umm al-Quwain

== Geography and geology of the United Arab Emirates ==
- Al Aweer
- Al Garhoud
- Al Hazzanah
- Al Isaily preserve
- Gulf of Oman
- ISO 3166-2:AE
- Nahwa
- Sharjah National Park

=== Islands ===
- Al Lulu Island
- Dalma Island
- Das Island
- Jumeirah Islands
- Muqayshit
- Marawah

=== Hills and mountains ===
- The Western Hajar Mountains
  - Jebel Buhais
  - Jebel Faya
  - Jebel Hafeet
- Ru'us al-Jibal
  - Jabal ar Raḩraḩ (1,691 m) Emirate of Ras Al Khaimah - Coordinates 25.94419°N, 56.15219°E
  - Jabal Sal (1,575 m) Emirate of Ras Al Khaimah (on the border between UAE and Oman) - Coordinadas 25.93251°N, 56.16921°E
  - Jabal Harf Tila - I (1,568 m) Emirate of Ras Al Khaimah - Coordinates 25°41'21.4"N 56°09'30.6"E
  - Jabal Harf Tila - II (1,555 m) Emirate of Ras Al Khaimah - Coordinates 25°41'11.8"N 56°09'20.9"E
  - Jabal Raḩabah (1,543 m) Emirate of Ras Al Khaimah - Coordinates 25.92610°N, 56.11689°E
  - Jebel Al Mebrah (1.505 m) Emirate of Fujairah - Coordinates 25.64860°N, 56.12860°E
  - Jabal Yibir (1,489 m) Emirate of Ras Al Khaimah - Coordinates 25.667600, 56.135750
  - Jabal Yabānah (1.480 m) Emirate of Ras Al Khaimah (on the border between UAE and Oman) - Coordinates 25.87500°N, 56.16000°E
  - Jebel Halhal (1,435 m) Emirate of Ras Al Khaimah - Coordinates 25.94184°N, 56.13511°E
  - Jabal Qada‘ah (1,370 m) Emirate of Ras Al Khaimah - Coordinates 25.77781°N, 56.14190°E
  - Jabal Yanas
  - Jebel Jais

  - Shumayliyyah
    - Jebel Al-Heben

=== Neighbourhoods ===
- Jumeirah
- Mirdif

=== Towns and villages ===
- Al Naba'ah
- Ar-Rams
- Dafta (United Arab Emirates)
- Dhadna
- Dhaid
- Dibba
- Jebel Ali
- Khalifa City
- Khatt
- Lehbab
- Masafi
- Wadi quda'ah

=== Geography stubs ===
- Abu Musa
- Ajmān
- Ajmān (city)
- Al Aweer
- Al Barsha Third
- Al Garhoud
- Al Hazzanah
- Al Isaily preserve
- Al-Jalila Field
- Al Khan
- Al Lulu Island
- Al Mushrif
- Al Naba'ah
- Al Reem Island
- Al Thaid
- Ar-Rams
- Bur Dubai
- Creative City
- Dafta (United Arab Emirates)
- Dalma (island)
- Das (island)
- Dhadna
- Dhaid
- Dibba
- Dubai Knowledge Village
- Dubai Marina
- Dubai Media City
- Educational Zone
- Emirates Road
- Gulf of Oman
- Hamriyah (Sharjah)
- Jebel Ali
  - Jebel Ali Free Zone
- Jumeirah Islands
- Khatt
- Lehbab
- Marawah
- Masafi
- Port Rashid
- Mina' Zayid
- Muqayshit
- Mushrif Park
- Nahwa
- Naif
- Rigga Road
- Ruwais
- Saadiyat Island
- Satwa, Dubai
- Shams Abu Dhabi
- Sharjah National Park
- Sila (city)
- Suna pur
- Template:UAE-geo-stub
- Wadi quda'ah
- Zabeel Road

== Government ==
- Dubai Police Force
- Federal National Council
- Military of the United Arab Emirates
- List of prime ministers of the United Arab Emirates

=== Foreign relations ===
- Greater and Lesser Tunbs

== History ==
- Gulf Air Flight 771
- Postage stamps and postal history of Sharjah
- Saqr bin Mohammad al-Qassimi

=== Elections ===
- United Arab Emirates parliamentary election, 2006

== Law ==
- Human rights in the United Arab Emirates

== Media ==
- Al Arabiya
- Aljazeera Publishing
- Dubai Media Incorporated
- Dubai One
- MBC 1
- MBC 2
- MBC 3
- MBC 4
- MBC FM
- Panorama FM
- The International Indian

=== Newspapers published here ===
- Al Bayan
- Al-Ittihad (newspaper)
- The Gulf Today
- The Arabian Post (Dubai)

== Organisations based here ==
- Dar al Ber Society
- Dubai Statistics Center
- Emaar Properties
- Middle East Public Relations Association
- MTME
- Nakheel Properties

== People ==
- Ahmad Ali Al Sayegh
- Mohammad bin Ali Al Abbar
- Al Bu Muhair
- Ali Abdul Aziz Ali
- Dhiyab bin Isa
- Khalid bin Mohammed Al Qasimi
- Maktoum Hasher Maktoum Al Maktoum
- Mohammed Al Gergawi
- Mohammed Bin Zayed Al Nahyan
- Lubna al Qasimi
- Rashid III ibn Ahmad Al Mu'alla
- Reem Al Hashimi
- Saeed Al Ghaith
- Saud bin Saqr al Qasimi
- Shaikh Hamad bin Mohammed Al Sharqi
- Shakhbut bin Dhiyab
- Sheikh Humaid bin Rashid Al Nuaimi
- Sultan Bin Saqr Al Qasimi
- Tahnun bin Shakhbut
- Zayed bin Khalifa

=== Inventors ===
- Ali Al Naqbi
- Khalifa Al Rumaithi
- Mohammed Al Shamsi
- Reem Al Marzouqi

=== Emirati sportspeople ===
- Mohammed Al Qubaisi

==== Cricketers ====
- Imtiaz Abbasi
- Ali Asad Abbas
- Arshad Ali
- Asghar Ali
- Asim Saeed
- Mohammad Aslam (UAE cricketer)
- Abdurrahman Bukhathir
- Shaukat Dukanwala
- Fahad Usman
- Mohammad Fawad
- Mazhar Hussain
- Kashif Ahmed
- Khurram Khan
- Arshad Laeeq
- Rizwan Latif
- Mohammad Ishaq
- Ganesh Mylvaganam
- Naeemuddin
- Riaz Poonawala
- Ramveer Rai
- Saleem Raza (cricketer)
- Abdul Rehman (UAE cricketer)
- Azhar Saeed
- Saeed-Al-Saffar
- Johanne Samarasekera
- Sameer Zia
- Shehzad Altaf
- Sohail Butt
- Syed Maqsood
- Mohammad Tauqeer
- Vijay Mehra (UAE cricketer)
- Sultan Zarawani

==== ODI cricketers ====
- Imtiaz Abbasi
- Ali Asad Abbas
- Arshad Ali
- Asghar Ali
- Asim Saeed
- Mohammad Aslam (UAE cricketer)
- Shaukat Dukanwala
- Fahad Usman
- Mazhar Hussain
- Khurram Khan
- Arshad Laeeq
- Rizwan Latif
- Mohammad Ishaq
- Ganesh Mylvaganam
- Naeemuddin
- Riaz Poonawala
- Ramveer Rai
- Saleem Raza (cricketer)
- Abdul Rehman (UAE cricketer)
- Azhar Saeed
- Saeed-Al-Saffar
- Johanne Samarasekera
- Sameer Zia
- Shehzad Altaf
- Sohail Butt
- Syed Maqsood
- Mohammad Tauqeer
- Vijay Mehra (UAE cricketer)
- Sultan Zarawani

==== Bowlers ====
- Rizwan Latif
- Sameer Zia
- Syed Maqsood

==== Footballers ====
- Ali Al-Wehaibi
- Abdulrahman Ibrahim
- Ismail Matar
- Mohamed Omer (football player)
- Saif Mohammed
- Adnan Al Talyani

==== Rally drivers ====
- Mohammed Ben Sulayem

==== Sport shooters ====
- Ahmad Mohammad Hasher Al Maktoum

==== Racehorse owners & breeders ====
- Godolphin Stables
- Mohammed bin Rashid Al Maktoum
- Saeed bin Maktoum bin Rashid Al Maktoum

=== Artists ===
- Mehad Hamad
- Chokra
- Najat Makki

=== Businessmen ===
- Saif Ahmad Al Ghurair
- Sultan Ahmed bin Sulayem

=== Politicians ===
- Ahmad Al Tayer
- Ali bin Abdulla Al Kaabi
- Saeed Mohammad Al Gandi
- Khalifa bin Zayed Al Nahyan
- Maktoum bin Rashid Al Maktoum
- Mohammed bin Rashid Al Maktoum
- Rashid bin Saeed Al Maktoum
- Mansour bin Zayed Al Nahyan
- Mohammad bin Zayed Al Nahyan
- Nahyan bin Mubarak Al Nahyan
- Lubna Khalid Al Qasimi
- Rashid ibn Abdullah Al Nuaimi
- Shakhbut Bin-Sultan Al Nahyan
- Abdullah bin Zayed Al Nahyan
- Sheikh Nahayan Mabarak Al Nahayan
- Sultan bin Zayed bin Sultan Al Nahyan
- Sultan bin Saeed Al Mansoori
- Zayed bin Sultan Al Nahyan
- Fayez Banihammad
- Marwan al-Shehhi

=== Writers ===
- See List of United Arab Emirati writers

== Politics ==
- Federal National Council

== Religion ==
- Islam in the United Arab Emirates
- Roman Catholicism in the United Arab Emirates

== Science and technology ==
- Emirates Science club

== Society ==
- Emirates Scout Association
- Girl Guides Association of the United Arab Emirates

== Sport ==
- 1996 AFC Asian Cup
- ADCC Submission Wrestling World Championship
- Australian rules football in the United Arab Emirates
- Godolphin Stables
- UAE Chess Federation
- United Arab Emirates cricket team

=== Football ===
- UAE League
- United Arab Emirates Football Association
- United Arab Emirates national football team
- Mohammed bin Rashid International Football Championship

==== Football clubs ====
- Al-Ahli (Dubai)
- Al Ain FC
- Dubai Club
- Al-Emarat
- Fujairah Club
- Al-Jazeera Club
- Al-Nasr Sports Club
- Al-Shaab (UAE)
- Al-Shabbab
- Sharjah FC
- Al-Wahda FC (Abu Dhabi)
- Al Wasl FC

=== Golf ===
- Abu Dhabi Golf Championship
- Dubai Desert Classic
- Dubai Ladies Masters
- DP World Tour Championship, Dubai

=== Olympics ===
- United Arab Emirates at the 1984 Summer Olympics
- United Arab Emirates at the 1988 Summer Olympics
- United Arab Emirates at the 1992 Summer Olympics
- United Arab Emirates at the 1996 Summer Olympics
- United Arab Emirates at the 2000 Summer Olympics
- United Arab Emirates at the 2004 Summer Olympics

=== Sport in Dubai ===
- Dubai 2016 Olympic bid
- Dubai Autodrome
- Dubai Fencing Club
- Dubai World Cup
- Team Dubai

== Tourism ==
- Tourism in Dubai
- See also: Airports in the United Arab Emirates
- See also: Hotels in the United Arab Emirates
- United Arab Emirates travel guide from Wikivoyage

=== Airlines ===
- Abu Dhabi Aviation
- Aerovista Airlines
- Air Arabia
- Air Cess
- British Gulf International Airlines
- Cargo Plus Aviation
- Dolphin Air
- Emirates
- Emirates SkyCargo
- Etihad Airways
- Falcon Aviation Services
- Falcon Express Cargo Airlines
- Kinshasa Airways
- Phoenix Aviation
- Pluto Airlines
- RAK Airways
- Royal Jet
- Flydubai
- ((Kenya Airways))

=== Visitor attractions ===
- List of museums in the United Arab Emirates

== Transportation ==
- Emirates Road
- Khor Fakkan

=== Aviation ===
- Dubai Airshow

==== Accidents and incidents ====
- Gulf Air Flight 771
- UPS Flight 6

=== Transport in Dubai ===
- Abra (boat)
- Dubai Metro
- Dubai Tram
- Port Rashid
- Rigga Road
- Sheikh Zayed Road
- Zabeel Road

=== Roads ===
- Sheikh Zayed Road
- Rigga Road
- Zabeel Road
- Emirates Road
- Baniyas Road
- Al Khaleej Road

== Stubs ==
- Template:UAE-stub
- 21st Century Tower
- Abdul Rehman (UAE cricketer)
- Abu Dhabi Indian School
- Abu Dhabi Investment Authority
- Abu Dhabi Islands Archaeological Survey
- Abu Dhabi Men's College
- Abu Dhabi National Exhibitions Company
- Abu Dhabi TV
- Abu Dhabi Women's College
- Adnan Al Talyani
- Ahmad Al Tayer
- Ahmad Bin Majid
- Ahmed Bin Rashed Al-Maktoum
- Ajman University of Science and Technology
- Al Ain FC
- Al Ain Women's College
- Al Burj
- Al Emirate Club Stadium
- Al Garhoud bridge
- Al Jazira Mohammed Bin Zayed Stadium
- Al Wasl FC
- Al-Ahli (Dubai)
- Al-Emarat
- Al-Ittihad (newspaper)
- Al-Maktoum Stadium
- Al-Nahyan Stadium
- Al-Nasr Sports Club
- Al-Rashid Stadium
- Al-Wahda FC (Abu Dhabi)
- Aldar Properties
- Ali Asad Abbas
- Ali al Kaabi
- American University in Dubai
- Asghar Ali
- Ashai Group International
- Asim Saeed
- Burj Al Alam
- BurJuman
- Chelsea Tower
- Du (telco)
- Dubai Club
- Dubai College
- Dubai International Capital
- Dubai International Convention Centre
- Dubai Media Incorporated
- Dubai Medical College for Girls
- Dubai Men's College
- Dubai Modern High School
- Dubai Women's College
- Emblem of the United Arab Emirates
- Emirates Office Tower
- Emirates Palace
- English College Dubai
- Etisalat University College
- Fahad Usman
- Family tree of the Al Maktoum rulers
- Flag of the United Arab Emirates
- Fujairah Club
- Fujairah Men's College
- Fujairah Women's College
- Ganesh Mylvaganam
- Grand Mosque
- Gulf News
- Gulf Research Centre
- House of Poetry
- IPIC
- Ibn Battuta Mall
- Infinity Tower
- Ismail Matar
- Jeque Zayed Stadium
- Jumeirah Emirates Towers Hotel
- Jumeriah primary school
- Khaleej Times
- Khalid Bin Mohammed Stadium
- Khalid bin Mohammed Al Qasimi
- Khalifa bin Zayed Al Nahyan
- Lake Shore Towers
- Maktoum Hasher Maktoum Al Maktoum
- Maktoum bin Rashid Al Maktoum
- Mall of Arabia (Dubai)
- Mall of the Emirates
- Mansour bin Zayed Al Nahyan
- Mohammad Aslam (UAE cricketer)
- Mohammad Fawad
- Mohammad Tauqeer
- Mohammad bin Ali Al Abbar
- Mohammad bin Zayed Al Nahyan
- Mohammed Al Gergawi
- Mohammed Al Qubaisi
- Mohammed Ben Sulayem
- Mohammed Bin Zayed Al Nahyan
- Mohammed bin Khalifa Al-Maktoum
- Nakheel Properties
- Postage stamps and postal history of Sharjah
- Postage stamps of Abu Dhabi
- Ras Al Khaimah Men's College
- Ras Al Khaimah Women's College
- Rashid bin Saeed Al Maktoum
- Rizwan Latif
- Roman Catholicism in the United Arab Emirates
- Rose Rotana Suites
- Saeed Al Ghaith
- Saeed al gandi
- Sameer Zia
- Saud bin Saqr al Qasimi
- Al-Shaab (UAE)
- Sharjah American International School
- Sharjah FC
- Sharjah Men's College
- Sharjah Stadium (football)
- Sharjah Women's College
- Shaukat Dukanwala
- Shehab Ahmed
- Sheikh Humaid bin Rashid Al Nuaimi
- Sheikh Khalifa International Stadium
- Sheikh Nahayan Mabarak Al Nahayan
- Ski Dubai
- Sultan Bin Saqr Al Qasimi
- Sultan Zarawani
- Sultan bin Zayed bin Sultan Al Nahyan
- Syed Maqsood
- Tahnoun Bin Mohamed Stadium
- Tahnun bin Shakhbut
- The British School - Al Khubairat
- The Gulf Today
- The Marina Torch
- The Tower (Dubai)
- United Arab Emirates University
- United Arab Emirates at the 1984 Summer Olympics
- United Arab Emirates at the 1988 Summer Olympics
- United Arab Emirates at the 1992 Summer Olympics
- United Arab Emirates at the 1996 Summer Olympics
- United Arab Emirates at the 2000 Summer Olympics
- United Arab Emirates parliamentary election, 2006
- United Arab Emirates war crimes
- Vijay Mehra (UAE cricketer)
- Yowlah
- Zayed University

== See also ==
- Lists of country-related topics - similar lists for other countries
