= 2004 Asia Cup =

Cricket tournament in Sri Lanka

- 2004 Asia Cup logo
- Dates: 16 July – 1 August 2004
- Administrator: Asian Cricket Council
- Cricket format: One Day International
- Tournament format(s): Round-robin and Knockout
- Host: Sri Lanka
- Champions: Sri Lanka (3rd title)
- Runners-up: India
- Participants: 6
- Matches: 13
- Player of the series: (Sri Lanka) Sanath Jayasuriya
- Most runs: (Pakistan) Shoaib Malik (316)
- Most wickets: (India) Irfan Pathan (14)

The eighth edition of cricket's Asia Cup (also called Indian Oil Asia Cup) was held in Sri Lanka after a gap of 4 years. Sri Lanka beat India in the final to win the cup. The 4 test playing Asian nations participated in the tournament along with, for the first time, leading Asian associate nations, the UAE and Hong Kong.

== Squads ==
Bangladesh	Hong Kong	India	Pakistan	Sri Lanka	United Arab Emirates
Habibul Bashar (c); Javed Omar; Rajin Saleh; Faisal Hossain; Mohammad Ashraful; Alok Kapali; Mushfiqur Rahman; Khaled Mahmud; Khaled Mashud; Mohammad Rafique; Manjural Islam Rana; Tapash Baisya; Tareq Aziz; Abdur Razzak	Rahul Sharma (c); Manoj Cheruparambil; Ilyas Gul; Tim Smart; Tabarak Dar; Alexander French; Najeeb Amar; Roy Lamsam; Nasir Hameed; Sher Lama; Khalid Khan; Nadeem Ahmed; Afzaal Haider; Graeme Jardine	Sourav Ganguly (c); Rahul Dravid (vc & wk); Sachin Tendulkar; Virender Sehwag; V.V.S. Laxman; Yuvraj Singh; Mohammed Kaif; Parthiv Patel (wk); Anil Kumble; Harbhajan Singh; Zaheer Khan; Lakshmipathy Balaji; Irfan Pathan; Ashish Nehra	Inzamam-ul-Haq (c); Yousuf Youhana; Imran Farhat; Yasir Hameed; Imran Nazir; Younis Khan; Moin Khan; Abdul Razzaq; Shoaib Malik; Rana Naved-ul-Hasan; Mohammad Sami; Shoaib Akhtar; Shabbir Ahmed; Danish Kaneria	Marvan Atapattu (c); Mahela Jayawardene; Sanath Jayasuriya; Saman Jayantha; Kumar Sangakkara; Tillakaratne Dilshan; Thilina Kandamby; Upul Chandana; Chaminda Vaas; Nuwan Zoysa; Muttiah Muralitharan; Avishka Gunawardane; Lasith Malinga; Farveez Maharoof	Khurram Khan (c); Arshad Ali; Abdul Rehman; Ali Asad Abbas; Asghar Ali; Asim Saeed; Fahad Usman; Mohammad Tauqir; Mohammad Fawad; Naeemuddin; Ramveer Rai; Rizwan Latif; Sameer Zia; Syed Maqsood

== Venues ==
Sri Lanka
Western Province		Central Province
Colombo		Dambulla
R. Premadasa Stadium	Sinhalese Sports Club	Dambulla Cricket Stadium
Capacity: 35,000	Capacity: 10,000	Capacity: 30,000
Matches: 6	Matches: 4	Matches: 3
2004 Asia Cup is located in Sri Lanka

== Group stage ==
=== Group A ===
Team	P	W	L	T	NR	BP	NRR	Points
Pakistan	2	2	0	0	0	2	+2.567	12
Bangladesh	2	1	1	0	0	1	+0.400	6
Hong Kong	2	0	2	0	0	0	-2.979	0

16 July 2004
(scorecard)

Bangladesh; 221/9 (50 overs)	v	Hong Kong; 105 (45.2 overs)
Javed Omar 68 (113); Ilyas Gull 3/46 (10 overs)		Tabarak Dar 20 (44); Abdur Razzak 3/17 (9 overs)

Bangladesh won by 116 runs
Sinhalese Sports Club Ground, Colombo, Sri Lanka
Umpires: Asoka de Silva (SL) and Tyron Wijewardene (SL)
Player of the match: Javed Omar (Ban)

17 July 2004
(scorecard)

Pakistan; 257/6 (50 overs)	v	Bangladesh; 181 (45.2 overs)
Yasir Hameed 102 (123); Abdur Razzak 2/36 (10 overs)		Javed Omar 62 (87); Shoaib Akhtar 3/30 (10 overs)

Pakistan won by 76 runs
Sinhalese Sports Club Ground, Colombo
Umpires: Brian Jerling (SA) and Gamini Silva (SL)
Player of the match: Yasir Hameed (Pak)

18 July 2004
(scorecard)

Pakistan; 343/5 (50 overs)	v	Hong Kong; 165 (44.1 overs)
Younis Khan 144 (122); Khalid Khan 2/62 (10 overs)		Tabarak Dar 36 (43); Shoaib Malik 4/19 (9.5 overs)

Pakistan won by 173 runs (D/L method)
Sinhalese Sports Club Ground, Colombo
Umpires: Asoka de Silva (SL) and Brian Jerling (SA)
Player of the match: Shoaib Malik (Pak)

=== Group B ===
Team	P	W	L	T	NR	BP	NRR	Points
Sri Lanka	2	2	0	0	0	1	+1.280	11
India	2	1	1	0	0	2	+1.040	7
United Arab Emirates	2	0	2	0	0	0	-2.320	0

16 July 2004
(scorecard)

India; 260/6 (50 overs)	v	United Arab Emirates; 144 (35 overs)
Rahul Dravid 104 (93); Rizwan Latif 2/69 (9 overs)		Mohammad Tauqir 55 (73); Irfan Pathan 3/28 (8 overs)

India won by 116 runs
Rangiri Dambulla International Stadium, Dambulla
Umpires: Billy Doctrove (WI) and Ian Howell (SA)
Player of the match: Rahul Dravid (Ind)

17 July 2004
(scorecard)

Sri Lanka; 239 (50 overs)	v	United Arab Emirates; 123 (47.5 overs)
Avishka Gunawardene 73 (89); Khurram Khan 4/32 (10 overs)		Ramveer Rai 39 (124); Upul Chandana 4/22 (9.5 overs)

Sri Lanka won by 116 runs
Rangiri Dambulla International Stadium, Dambulla
Umpires: Ian Howell (SA) and Peter Parker (Aus)
Player of the match: Khurram Khan (UAE)

- Lasith Malinga (SL) made his ODI debut.

18 July 2004
(scorecard)

Sri Lanka; 282/4 (50 overs)	v	India; 270/8 (50 overs)
Mahela Jayawardene 58 (49); Irfan Pathan 1/49 (10 overs)		Rahul Dravid 82 (100); Nuwan Zoysa 3/49 (10 overs)

Sri Lanka won by 12 runs
Rangiri Dambulla International Stadium, Dambulla
Umpires: Billy Doctrove (WI) and Peter Parker (Aus)
Player of the match: Nuwan Zoysa (SL)

== Super Fours ==
Team	P	W	L	T	NR	NRR	BP	Points
Sri Lanka	3	2	1	0	0	+1.144	3	13
India	3	2	1	0	0	+0.022	2	12
Pakistan	3	2	1	0	0	+0.162	0	10
Bangladesh	3	0	3	0	0	-1.190	1	1

21 July 2004
(scorecard)

Bangladesh; 177 (49.1 overs)	v	India; 178/2 (38.3 overs)
Mohammad Ashraful 35 (69); Irfan Pathan 3/32 (8.1 overs)		Sachin Tendulkar 82* (126); Mohammad Rafique 1/30 (7 overs)

India won by 8 wickets
Sinhalese Sports Club Ground, Colombo
Umpires: Billy Doctrove (WI) and David Shepherd (Eng)
Player of the match: Sachin Tendulkar (Ind)

21 July 2004
(scorecard)

Pakistan; 122 (39.5 overs)	v	Sri Lanka; 123/3 (32 overs)
Abdul Razzaq 43 (71); Nuwan Zoysa 3/29 (10 overs)		Avishka Gunawardene 26 (78); Abdul Razzaq 2/21 (6 overs)

Sri Lanka won by 7 wickets
R Premadasa Stadium, Colombo
Umpires: Billy Bowden (NZ) and Peter Parker (Aus)
Player of the match: Nuwan Zoysa (SL)

23 July 2004
(scorecard)

Bangladesh; 190/9 (50 overs)	v	Sri Lanka; 191/0 (33.3 overs)
Mohammad Ashraful 66 (120); Chaminda Vaas 3/30 (10 overs)		Sanath Jayasuriya 107* (101)

Sri Lanka won by 10 wickets
R Premadasa Stadium, Colombo
Umpires: Peter Parker (Aus) and David Shepherd (Eng)
Player of the match: Sanath Jayasuriya (SL)

25 July 2004
(scorecard)

Pakistan; 300/9 (50 overs)	v	India; 241/8 (50 overs)
Shoaib Malik 143 (137); Sachin Tendulkar 3/28 (5 overs)		Sachin Tendulkar 78 (103); Shabbir Ahmed 2/38 (10 overs)

Pakistan won by 59 runs
R Premadasa Stadium, Colombo
Umpires: Billy Bowden (NZ) and Billy Doctrove (WI)
Player of the match: Shoaib Malik (Pak)

27 July 2004
(scorecard)

India; 271/6 (50 overs)	v	Sri Lanka; 267/9 (50 overs)
Virender Sehwag 81 (92); Lasith Malinga 2/56 (10 overs)		Sanath Jayasuriya 130 (132); Virender Sehwag 3/37 (9 overs)

India won by 4 runs
R Premadasa Stadium, Colombo
Umpires: Billy Doctrove (WI) and David Shepherd (Eng)
Player of the match: Virender Sehwag (Ind)

29 July 2004
(scorecard)

Bangladesh; 166 (45.2 overs)	v	Pakistan; 167/4 (41 overs)
Khaled Mashud 54 (94); Shabbir Ahmed 3/32 (10 overs)		Shoaib Malik 48 (56); Abdur Razzak 1/29 (10 overs)

Pakistan won by 6 wickets
R Premadasa Stadium, Colombo
Umpires: Billy Bowden (NZ) and Peter Parker (Aus)
Player of the match: Shoaib Malik (Pak)

== Final ==
1 August 2004
(scorecard)

Sri Lanka; 228/9 (50 overs)	v	India; 203/9 (50 overs)
Marvan Atapattu 65 (87); Irfan Pathan 2/33 (7 overs)		Sachin Tendulkar 74 (100); Upul Chandana 3/33 (10 overs)

Sri Lanka won by 25 runs
R Premadasa Stadium, Colombo
Umpires: Billy Bowden (NZ) and David Shepherd (Eng)
Player of the match: Marvan Atapattu (SL)

- Sri Lanka won the toss and elected to bat.
