= Khalid Khan (Hong Kong cricketer) =

Hong Kong cricketer (born 1971)

Personal information
- Born: 7 February 1971 (age 55); Pakistan
- Batting: Right-handed
- Bowling: Right-arm medium-fast

International information
- National side: Hong Kong
- ODI debut (cap 5): 16 July 2004 v Bangladesh
- Last ODI: 18 July 2004 v Pakistan

Career statistics
Competition	ODI	First-class
Matches	2	2
Runs scored	5	13
Batting average	2.50	6.50
100s/50s	0/0	0/0
Top score	3	9*
Balls bowled	108	178
Wickets	3	4
Bowling average	31.00	20.25
5 wickets in innings	0	0
10 wickets in match	0	0
Best bowling	2/62	3/24
Catches/stumpings	0/–	0/–
- Source: CricketArchive, 26 January 2025

Khalid Khan (born 7 February 1971) is a Hong Kong former cricketer who has played two One Day Internationals and two first class matches for Hong Kong. He played as a seam bowler who was named at number 10 or 11 in the batting order, making a total of five international runs, but he has also got three wickets in official internationals - those of Bangladeshi captain Khaled Mashud and both Pakistani openers, Imran Nazir and Imran Farhat, at the 2004 Asia Cup.

Khan's first class cricket career began on 24 April 2005 in Sharjah against the United Arab Emirates, where he took a wicket with his third ball, dismissing Asghar Ali lbw. In his next over, number three Fahad Usman was bowled, but his next wicket came two hours later, with the number 11 Rizwan Latif bowled as the UAE were bowled out for 127, the same score that Hong Kong had made in the first innings, where Khan had hit his first boundary before he was bowled by Latif. Despite a second innings total of 184, however, Hong Kong failed to defend the total as Khan only got one more wicket - Asghar Ali lbw again.

In his next match against Nepal rain struck to shorten the match to 78 overs in three days, and Khan bowled 11 of those without reward, but he did make a career highest score of nine runs from number 11 - an unbeaten score.
