= Al Shaab Village =

Shopping mall in the United Arab Emirates

Coordinates: 25.37192°N 55.42635°E

Al Shaab Village is a shopping mall in the Emirate of Sharjah, United Arab Emirates.It has more than 270 shops, 30+ Abaya Shops, 400+ parking facilities, an indoor and outdoor food court with 30+ F & B, and as well as an exhibition hall, the largest ice skating rink in Sharjah, a billiard and gaming center, an amusement park, and a cinema.

Located in Sheikh Khalid Bin Mohammed Al Qassimi Street in Al - Hazannah district of Sharjah Emirate, the combined exhibition-style shopping mall is a part of Al-Shaab CSC Complex.

Based on the total area which includes Skate gate, the largest ice rink in Sharjah.

Access to the Shopping mall is provided via Sheikh Khalid Bin Mohammed Al Qassimi Street which stretches from Sharjah towards Ajman.
