= Marawah =

Marawah may refer to:

- Marawah, Libya
- Marawah, United Arab Emirates
