= Vijay Mehra =

Vijay Mehra may refer to:

- Vijay Mehra (Indian cricketer), who played Test cricket for India
- Vijay Mehra (UAE cricketer), who played one-day international cricket for the United Arab Emirates
