= Sheikh Khalid Bin Mohammed Al Qassimi Street =

Sheikh Khalid Bin Mohammed Al Qassimi Street is an Inter city road in the emirates of sharjah. The road Number is known as S111 which starts from S124 which is known as Sheik zayed Street at the second exit of Sheik humaid bin saqr al qassimi Square and finishes at S134 which is known as Nuaimiyah Street.

The Road Passes through Al-Ramla, Al-Jazzat, Al Ghafia, Al-Sabka, Al - Hazannah, Al-Mansura and Al-Fayha Districts.
