= Nakheel Tower =

Cancelled skyscraper

- بُرْجُ ٱلنَّخِيلِ
- Artist's rendering of Nakheel Tower at night.
- Interactive map of the Nakheel Tower area
- Former names: Al Burj

General information
- Status: On-hold (cancelled in 2009)
- Type: residential / hotel / office
- Location: Dubai, United Arab Emirates
- Coordinates: 25°03′16″N 55°07′53″E
- Construction started: 2008
- Completed: TBD
- Opening: TBD
- Cost: over $38 billion

Height
- Architectural: 1,000 m (3,281 ft)+

Technical details
- Floor count: 200
- Floor area: 900,000 m² / 9,687,519 ft²
- Lifts/elevators: 156

Design and construction
- Architect: Woods Bagot
- Developer: Nakheel Properties
- Structural engineer: WSP Cantor Seinuk

Nakheel Tower (Arabic: بُرْجُ ٱلنَّخِيلِ) is a cancelled 1,000-metre (3,281 ft) tall skyscraper in Dubai, United Arab Emirates by developer Nakheel. The project was previously called Al Burj (Arabic: ٱلْبُرْجُ "The Tower"). While the proposal changed over time, the tower was intended to be the tallest building in the world, surpassing the 828-metre (2,717 ft) Burj Khalifa which was completed in 2010.

In January 2009, it was announced that the project was put on hold due to financial problems caused by the Great Recession. As a result of the Dubai World 2009 debt standstill, Nakheel Group's financial problems increased considerably and the tower was cancelled in December 2009.

Nakheel was in talks with several potential contractors, including South Korea's Samsung C&T (who also built Burj Khalifa), Japanese Shimizu Corporation and Australian Grocon. WSP was Lead Consultant for the structure, heading a consortium that included LERA of New York and VDM of Australia, and working with architects Woods Bagot.

== Location ==
The tower was proposed in 2003 as the centrepiece of Palm Jumeirah, one of the world's largest man-made islands. It was to be named "The Pinnacle" and rise from the centre of a canal on the trunk of the island. The height was to be 750 m (2,460 ft) and the building was to consist of 120 floors of luxury apartments. It was replaced by the Trump International Hotel and Tower and moved to the Dubai Waterfront. Although ground leveling and land reclamation had begun on the Dubai Waterfront, construction of the tower never started because of the proximity to the Al Maktoum International Airport.

The location was changed to a plot near Jumeirah Lake Towers and Dubai Marina. The tower would have been the focal point of Nakheel's plans for the Ibn Battuta Mall development next to Jumeirah Islands and Jumeirah Lake Towers. It would have been the center of the Nakheel Harbour and Tower complex, which would have included about 20 smaller towers of up to 90 stories, a marina, and part of the Arabian Canal. The development would have been next to the revamped shopping mall.

== Design ==
With Woods Bagot replacing Pei Partnership as the architectural partner, the latest released design had named the development Nakheel Harbour and Tower. Though in exterior appearance and function it would be a single tower over 1,000 metres (3,300 ft) tall, this even grander incarnation would have been "made up of four towers with four individual cores forming an approximate 100 meters in diameter." Nakheel also claimed on their engineering page that the towers would be joined by four-level, full diameter sky bridges at approximately every twenty-five floors. The sky bridges would act to tie the buildings together structurally as well as to provide each part of the building with its own village centre in the sky. It is the four codependent foundations that would have provided the necessary structural support for such a great relative height increase over existing supertalls. The design included a distinctive crescent-shaped podium encircling the base of the tower.

Nakheel Tower shape

The tower would have been serviced by 156 lifts at sufficient speeds and capacities to allow for travel from the ground floor to the observation deck in four minutes.

== Height ==
Projections of Nakheel Tower's final height varied widely. Nakheel was believed to be engaging in a strategy of secrecy similar to that employed by Emaar with Burj Khalifa. According to officials at Nakheel, the tower was originally designed to be at least 700 m (2,300 ft) tall and have more than 160 floors, although an early render showed the tower with more than 200 floors. Companies involved in the project reported an initial height expectation of 1,600 m (5,200 ft) which was later reduced to 1,200 m (3,900 ft). In July, 2007, Nakheel CEO Chris O'Donnell was reported to have said that "height isn't everything" and suggested that Al Burj might not be any taller than the Burj Khalifa, which is 828 m (2,717 ft). Yet only a week later, Nakheel reaffirmed that the tower would be taller than 1 kilometer. A report on 20 June 2008 claimed that the tower was planned to be 1 mile (5,280 ft) tall. This would not only surpass the Burj Khalifa, but it would also surpass the delayed Jeddah Tower in Saudi Arabia, which was intended to rise slightly over a kilometer.

== Name ==
During the history of the project, it was known by three different names: Al Burj, Tall Tower, and Nakheel Tower. Initially named Al Burj, the project was renamed Tall Tower for a few months, until being changed to Nakheel Tower.

== See also ==
- Nakheel Tower, Riyadh
- Developments in Dubai
- List of tallest buildings in Dubai
- List of tallest buildings in the United Arab Emirates
- Proposed tall buildings and structures
