= Marawah Island =

Island in United Arab Emirates

Native name: جزيرة مَرَوَح
- Location within United Arab Emirates

Geography
- Location: Al Dhafra, Abu Dhabi
- Coordinates: 24°17′50″N 53°16′56″E

Administration
- United Arab Emirates
- Emirate: Abu Dhabi

Marawah (Arabic: مَرَوَح, romanized: Marawaḥ) is a low-lying island off the coast of the Al Dhafra region of the Emirate of Abu Dhabi, the United Arab Emirates.

== Geography ==
Marawah is 15 km (9.3 miles) north of the Khor al-Bazm (lagoon) along the Abu Dhabi coastline in the southern Gulf. It lies 100 km (62 miles) west of the UAE capital, Abu Dhabi. It is about 13 km (8.1 miles) from east to west and about 5.5 km (3.4 miles) from north to south. There are three islands in proximity to Marawah: the small island of Al Fiyah to the west, the island of Junaina to the southeast, and the island of Abu al Abyad in the east.

=== Geology ===
Research indicates that the island was formed from relict Pleistocene limestone platforms linked by Holocene sand and beach deposits and intervening patches of sabkha.

=== Environment ===
Marawah island is in the Marawah Biosphere Reserve, as recognized by the United Nations Educational, Scientific and Cultural Organization, and is one of the six marine protected areas in the Zayed Network of Protected Areas, a network managed by the Environment Agency - Abu Dhabi.

The coastline of the island, with its extensive tidal mudflats, has been designated an Important Bird Area (IBA) by BirdLife International because it supports both passage and wintering populations of many waders, including grey plovers, Siberian sand plovers, bar-tailed godwits, great knots and crab-plovers.

== History ==
The west first became aware of the island around 1829 when the East India Company recorded its location in a nautical survey of the Persian Gulf.

== Archaeology ==
Although privately owned, the island is a key center of archaeology. Recent excavations yielded a small natural pearl that was carbon dated to 5800/5600 BCE.

In 1992, the Abu Dhabi Islands Archaeological Survey (ADIAS) completed a preliminary survey of the island. Archeologists identified 13 sites dating from the Neolithic to the Islamic Period (12-13 AD).

In 2004, ADIAS discovered what was, at the time, the oldest human skeleton ever found in the region amid the remains of Neolithic buildings and over 200 flint tools. DNA was extracted from teeth that were recovered from the site, and it was determined that the remains were about 7,500 years old.
