= Naeemuddin Aslam =

Emirati cricketer

Personal information
- Full name: Naeemuddin Aslam
- Born: 31 May 1982 (age 44); Dubai, United Arab Emirates
- Batting: Right-handed
- Role: Batsman

International information
- National side: United Arab Emirates
- ODI debut (cap 25): 16 July 2004 v India
- Last ODI: 17 July 2004 v Sri Lanka

Career statistics
Competition	ODI	FC	LA	T20
Matches	2	9	32	6
Runs scored	12	466	475	111
Batting average	6.00	31.06	19.00	37.00
100s/50s	0/0	1/0	0/2	0/1
Top score	12	152	72	60*
Catches/stumpings	1/–	3/0	16/1	0/–
- Source: Cricinfo, 9 March 2013

Naeemuddin Aslam is a former cricketer who has played for the United Arab Emirates national cricket team. He is most experienced in List A cricket having played 32 games. However, his maiden century came in the first class format against Uganda in 2010.

== National team career ==
=== 2004 ===
Naeemuddin made his debut for the senior side during the 2004 ICC Six Nations Challenge, held in Sharjah in March 2004, where he played four of the UAE's five matches. He was called upon to bat twice, making 30 against Scotland, and 12 against Namibia. UAE lost both matches where Naeemuddin batted, and their final record of three wins and two losses in the tournament was not enough to qualify them for the 2004 Champions Trophy.

Naeemuddin was retained for the side that drew with Nepal in the first match of the first class Intercontinental Cup competition, totalling 39 runs in his two innings, and in July he was called up to play in the 2004 Asia Cup. UAE lost both matches in the tournament by 116 runs, to Test nations India and Sri Lanka, and Naeemuddin got a golden duck in the match against India. Against Sri Lanka, however, his 12 was the third-highest score of all UAE batsmen, in a total of 123.

=== 2005 ===
In 2005, the UAE took part in the ICC Trophy in Ireland, where they attempted to qualify for the 2007 World Cup. Naeemuddin was again part of the team, only missing out on the group stage game with Ireland. After failing to pass 15 in his first three games, Naeemuddin was the top scorer by far in the final game of the group stage, which UAE needed to win to have a chance of qualifying for the World Cup. His 76 off 106 deliveries made up more than a third of UAE's eventual total of 201 all out, and gave the bowlers something to defend. Their opponents Uganda were bowled out for 138, giving UAE the win by 63 runs, and two play-off matches to qualify for the World Cup.

In the first, against Namibia, UAE were chasing 241 to win, and Naeemuddin, at number three in the batting line-up, had to bat in the very first over as opener Asim Saeed went for a three-ball duck. Naeemuddin hit 22 off 45 balls, sharing stands with Arshad Ali and Syed Maqsood, but was out with the score on 45 for three. The other batsmen helped the total to 242 for six, giving the UAE a four-wicket win and a play-off match with Netherlands. Once again, UAE were chasing, but this time they needed 288 in 50 overs; Naeemuddin could only contribute 15, the fourth-highest score of the innings, and UAE were all out for 142.

Naeemuddin did not play any of UAE's three Intercontinental Cup matches during 2005, but the ICC Trophy wasn't his last appearance. During the EurAsia Cricket Series in Dubai in April 2006, he played three matches, batted twice, but failed to score in both innings.
