= Ali bin Abdulla Al Kaabi =

United Arab Emirati politician

Ali bin Abdullah Al Kaabi is the former minister of labour and social affairs in the United Arab Emirates. He was appointed in 2004 on the same day of the president Shiekh Zayed's death.

== Education ==
Alkaabi was educated at The George Washington University in Washington DC. He obtained a PhD in engineering management.

== Career ==
Alkaabi worked for a short time at the UAE Military Office as a computer network administrator and then at the UAE scholarship office in Washington DC.
