= Jumeirah Emirates Towers Hotel =

56-storey hotel in the city of Dubai, United Arab Emirates

Jumeirah Emirates Towers
- فندق الأعمال جميرا أبراج الامارات
- Jumeirah Emirates Towers Hotel (at right)
- Interactive map of the Jumeirah Emirates Towers area
- Alternative names: Emirates Towers II

General information
- Type: Hotel
- Architectural style: Modernism
- Location: Sheikh Zayed Road; Dubai, United Arab Emirates
- Coordinates: 25°13′03″N 55°16′55″E
- Construction started: 1996
- Completed: 2000

Height
- Antenna spire: 309 m (1,014 ft)
- Roof: 269 m (883 ft)
- Top floor: 222.5 m (730 ft)

Technical details
- Floor count: 67
- Floor area: 95,000 square metres (1,020,000 sq ft)
- Lifts/elevators: 42

Design and construction
- Architects: Hazel W.S. Wong Norr; Norr Group Consultants Int. Ltd.
- Main contractor: Ssang-Yong Engineering & Construction; Cleveland Bridge & Engineering Company; Murray & Roberts

Other information
- Number of rooms: 400

Website
- www.jumeirahemiratestowers.com

Jumeirah Emirates Hotel Tower, also known as Emirates Tower Two, is a 67-floor hotel in the city of Dubai, United Arab Emirates. The hotel includes 41 luxury suites and is operated by Jumeirah Group. Connected with the Emirates Office Tower by a retail boulevard, the two towers form the Emirates Towers complex. At a structural height of 309 m (1,014 ft), Emirates Towers Hotel is the smaller of the two sister towers. It ranks as the 48th-tallest building in the world. It is the world's third-tallest all-hotel building. Construction, by BESIX subsidiary Six Construct, was completed on 15 April 2000.

In 2018, Indian actress Sridevi died in the hotel in her room 2201, after drowning in bathtub.

== See also ==
- List of tallest buildings in Dubai
- List of tallest buildings in the United Arab Emirates
