= Girl Guides Association of the United Arab Emirates =

National organization in the United Arab Emirates

- Girl Guides Association of the United Arab Emirates

- logo
- Country: United Arab Emirates
- Founded: 1973
- Membership: 5,640
- Affiliation: World Association of Girl Guides and Girl Scouts

The Girl Guides Association of the United Arab Emirates (Arabic: اتحاد الفتيات المرشدات الإماراتي) is the national Guiding organization of the United Arab Emirates. The association serves 2,484 members (as of 2017). Founded in 1973, the girls-only organization became a full member of the World Association of Girl Guides and Girl Scouts in 1984.

The Girl Guide emblem incorporates elements of the emblem as well as the flag of the United Arab Emirates.

== See also ==
- Emirates Scout Association
