= Al-Jalila Field =

Oil field offshore of the United Arab Emirates

Al Jalila oil Field
- Location of the Al Jalila oil field within United Arab Emirates
- Country: United Arab Emirates
- Offshore/onshore: offshore
- Coordinates: 25°20′0″N 54°40′0″Esource:eowiki
- Operator: Dubai Petroleum (NOC)

Field history
- Discovery: 2010
- Start of production: 2014 est.

The Al-Jalila Field is an oil field located offshore of the United Arab Emirates in the Persian Gulf. The oil field was discovered in early 2010 and production was expected to begin in late 2014, according to the UAE government. The oil field was named after the daughter of Mohammed bin Rashid Al Maktoum, the UAE's current Prime Minister. The Al-Jalila platform is currently under construction and is being operated by Dubai Petroleum (NOC).
