= Mohammad Aslam (Emirati cricketer) =

Emirati cricketer (born 1961)

Personal information
- Born: 7 September 1961 (age 65); Karachi, Sindh, Pakistan
- Batting: Right-handed
- Bowling: Right-arm fast-medium
- Role: Middle order batsman

International information
- National side: United Arab Emirates (1996-1996)
- Source: CricInfo, 7 March 2006

Mohammad Aslam (born 7 September 1961) is a Pakistani-born former cricketer who played for the United Arab Emirates national cricket team. He played four One Day Internationals for the UAE, all of them in February 1996, and scored 38 runs at an average of 9.50. His highest score was 23.
