= Ramveer Rai =

Emirati cricketer (born 1987)

Personal information
- Born: 1 December 1987 (age 37); United Arab Emirates
- Batting: Right-handed
- Bowling: Slow left-arm orthodox
- Source: CricInfo, 7 May 2007

Ramveer Rai (born 1 December 1987) is a cricketer who played for the United Arab Emirates national cricket team, having played one One Day International and one first class match for the United Arab Emirates. He has also represented UAE at youth level.

Rai opened the batting in his only One-day International, against Sri Lanka at the 2004 Asia Cup, top-scoring with 39 after over two hours at the crease, and he faced 124 balls, more than anyone else in the match. At the time, he was the youngest player to appear for the UAE, and the sixth youngest in an ODI, at 16 years, 229 days. However, after scoring 2 and 1 in an Intercontinental Cup match against Malaysia in September 2004, Rai was dropped from the side, and has not featured at senior level for the UAE again.
