= Emirates Scout Association =

National Scouting organization of the United Arab Emirates

- جمعية كشافة الامارات
- Country: United Arab Emirates
- Founded: 1972
- Membership: 5,522
- Affiliation: World Organization of the Scout Movement
- Website https://www.uaescouts.ae/

The Emirates Scout Association (Arabic: جمعية كشافة الإمارات) is the national Scouting organization of the United Arab Emirates. Scouting was founded in the United Arab Emirates in 1972 and became a member of the World Organization of the Scout Movement in 1977. It has 5,522 members (as of 2011).

Scouting was previously founded in several of the individual emirates prior to unification. Scouting was extant in Sharjah by 1957, and in Umm al-Qiwain prior to 1971.

The national Scout camp is at Sharjah. Scouts participate in regional and world Scouting activities, and are active with other Persian Gulf states training in Wood Badge.

The Scout Motto is Kun Musta'idan or كن مستعداً, translating as Be Prepared in Arabic. The noun for a single Scout is Kashaf or كشاف in Arabic.

National Scout Organisations such as the one in the United Arab Emirates apply design thinking to address local social, economic and environmental issues. For example, they designed a simple, sustainable system that reduces water waste during wudu (an Islamic washing ritual), in which the system redirects water to irrigate plants, while raising awareness about water conservation and the importance of eco-friendly practices in schools, mosques, homes and the wider community.

The 1990s-2009 emblem incorporated both the emblem and the flag of the United Arab Emirates

== See also ==
- Girl Guides Association of the United Arab Emirates
