= Emirates Office Tower =

56-floor office building along Sheikh Zayed Road in Dubai, United Arab Emirates

- Emirates Tower One
- Emirates Office Tower (at left)

Record height
- Tallest in Dubai from 2000 to 2008^{[I]}
- Preceded by: Burj Al Arab
- Surpassed by: Almas Tower

General information
- Status: Completed
- Type: Office
- Location: Dubai, United Arab Emirates
- Construction started: 1996
- Completed: 2000

Height
- Architectural: 355 m (1,165 ft)
- Roof: 301 m (988 ft)
- Top floor: 240.4 m (789 ft)

Technical details
- Floor count: 54
- Floor area: 100,000 square metres (1,100,000 sq ft)
- Lifts/elevators: 17

Design and construction
- Architects: Hazel W.S. Wong Norr; Group Consultants Int. Ltd.

The Emirates Office Tower, is a 54-floor office building along Sheikh Zayed Road in the city of Dubai, United Arab Emirates, connected with the 54-floor Jumeirah Emirates Towers Hotel by a retail boulevard. The two towers form what is commonly referred to as the Emirates Towers complex. The tower has a total structural height of 355 m (1,165 ft) and roof height of 311 m (1,020 ft), making it the 55th-tallest building in the world. The Emirates Office Tower One is taller than the neighbouring Jumeirah Emirates Towers Hotel, but has two fewer floors. Construction of the building was completed on 3 November 1999.

== Design and Style ==
The Emirates Office Tower is located in the financial centre of Dubai. The Emirates Towers complex designed by NORR represents modern business age architecture. Two equilateral triangles are one of their kind in Dubai. The tower consists of three large core walls. The walls support the load transferred at four levels by large steel trusses, which are connected to the cores with the aid of post tensioning and shear stud connection. A curved wall rising almost the whole height of one face of the triangular building provides a view of the city.

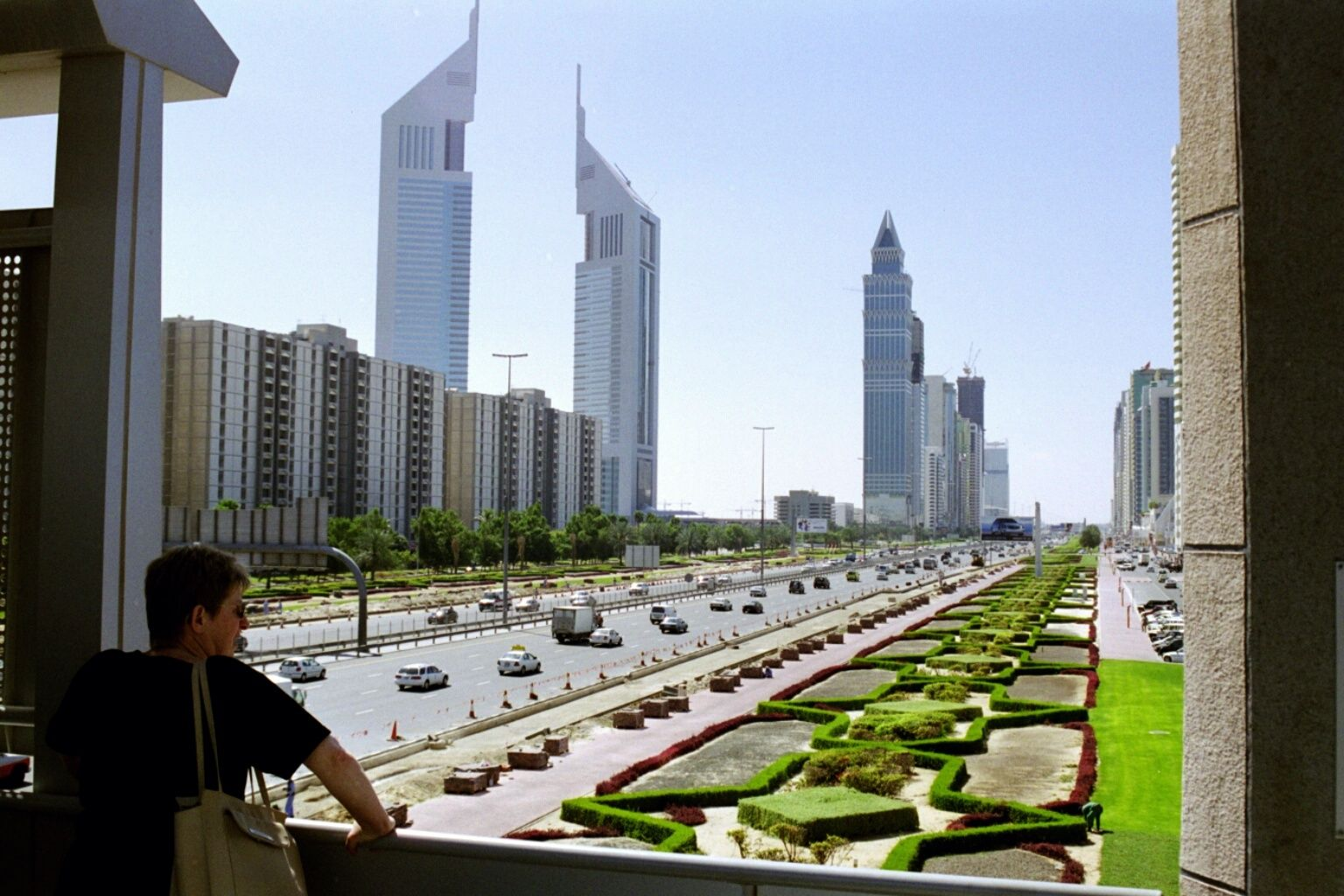
Emirates Office Tower

The Emirates Office Tower building is surrounded by clad in silver aluminium panels, silver and copper reflective glass. Flanking each tower at the base is a low curvilinear structure, that houses parking and service elements. Both towers rise from a terraced podium featuring a boutique retail mall, restaurants, and cafes with leasable retail area of 80,730 sq ft (7,500 m^{2}), at the three storey base. Landscaping is an integral feature of the design with undulating land forms, water features, and a variety of plants creating a unique development in downtown Dubai. Located along the Sheikh Zayed road the buildings are one of the most distinctive pairs of skyscrapers.

== See also ==
- List of tallest buildings and structures in the world
- List of tallest freestanding structures in the world
- List of tallest buildings in Dubai
- List of tallest buildings in the United Arab Emirates
- List of tallest office buildings in the world
- Emirates Towers

Records
Preceded by Burj Al Arab	Tallest building in Dubai; 2000 – 2009	Succeeded by Almas Tower
