= Al Naba'ah =

Area of the emirate of Sharjah in the United Arab Emirates

Coordinates: 25.3645°N 55.3961°E

Al Naba'ah is an area of the emirate of Sharjah in the United Arab Emirates.
