= Dubai Men's College =

- Motto: Learn Today, Lead Tomorrow
- Type: Public Polytechnic College
- Established: 1989
- Location: Academic City, Dubai, United Arab Emirates
- Website: http://dbm.hct.ac.ae/

Dubai Men's College (DMC), one of the first Higher Colleges of Technology (HCT), is a government-funded higher education institution located in Academic City, Dubai, in the United Arab Emirates.

DMC provides bachelor and associate degrees in applied communications, business and financial services, electrical and civil engineering technology, health sciences, and information technology. English is the medium of instruction. A foundation program has been designed to equip students with enough knowledge of the English language to cope at a HCT facility.

== History ==
DMC was established in 1989 as one of the first four Higher Colleges of Technology in the country. DMC's first home was a former car show room. With nine classrooms, two twenty-station computer labs, an electronics lab, a physics lab and a civil engineering lab, the college welcomed its first batch of 95 students on 9 September 1989.

== Organization ==
DMC is governed by the central administration of HCT headed by the Vice Chancellor, Dr Abdullatif Al Shamsi.

The college support departments include, Career Development and Industrial Alliances, Corporate Training and Graduate Studies, Entrepreneurship and Applied Research, Community and Public Relations, Academic and Student Services, Information Technology Services, Human Resources and Finance and Administration.

== Sports ==
The DMC sports and fitness center opened in 2004. Given the prevalence of obesity in the UAE, these facilities have made a significant difference. The 100,000 square-meter facility features an Olympic-size swimming pool, an outdoor multipurpose stadium, a soccer pitch, two 5-a side soccer pitches, a volleyball court, four tennis courts, a running track and field, two basketball courts, three squash courts, a cricket pitch, two beach soccer pitches, two beach volleyball pitches, an adventure quest site, two fully equipped gyms and a games room for playing snooker, billiards and table tennis.

== The DMC Learning Centre ==
The DMC Learning Centre houses more than 35,000 children's books and magazines. Textbooks and reference books support the college courses but books of fiction, popular videos, DVDs and graded readers are available on loan.

== Student services and activities ==
The Student Services department carries out a variety of tasks from helping new students in the transition from school to college life to finding suitable jobs for them on graduation. The student services department provides career counseling and career guidance to help students choose appropriate programs and subsequently suitable jobs. Work experience opportunities for students are offered through the career development centre.

A wide range of extracurricular activities are offered throughout the academic year. Student activities are generally organized by the Dubai Men's College Student Administration Council and sporting activities by the sports section. Some of the college events organized last year include the iftar party, the Ramadan sports festival, international day, World Challenge, National Day and the mathematics rally. Many student clubs such as the art club, photography club, environmental club, chess club, anime and gaming club, billiards and snooker club, bowling club, mathematics club, Japan club, martial arts club, toastmasters’ club, squash club and formula one racing club are also organized during out-of-college hours.

== Scholarship program ==
DMC has a scholarship program to assist students with financial difficulties. The program has been developed with the cooperation of other organizations in the community and supported by His Excellency Sheikh Nahayan Mabarak Al Nahayan, UAE Minister of Education and Research and Chancellor of the HCT. The Mohammed bin Rashid Al Maktoum Foundation has been a continuous provider of assistance to students at Dubai Men's College. A Board of Trustees awards scholarships on the basis of merit and need.

== Alumni ==
DMC has produced many alumni. Some are well-known.

Among the best-known are:

- Saeed Mohamed Ali Al Nabouda, Chief Project Officer at Dubai Culture and Arts Authority
- Abdulbasit Mohamed Abdulla Al Janahi, Deputy CEO at Shaikh Mohammed bin Rashid Establishment
- Mattar Al Mari, Director of Jebel Ali Customs
- Fouad S Mansoor, General Manager – Operations at MAF Investments LLC
- Jamal Qassim Sultan Albanna, Sharaf Group Director of Business Development at Sultan Group Investments LLC
- Azzan Lootah, Project Manager at the Prime Minister's Office
- Arif Alharmi, Chief Executive Officer of Amlak Finance
- Abdulla Al Hammadi, Pilot Cadet Recruitment Manager for the airline Emirates and Boeing 777 captain
- Abdulla Abduljabbar Mohamed Al Majed, Minister Advisor at the Ministry of Justice
- Salim Al Marri, Manager of DubaiSat-1 Programme Emirates Institution for Advanced Science and Technology
- Malek Sultan Al Malek, Executive Director of Dubai Internet City
