= Falcon City of Wonders =

Dubai-based real-estate project

Coordinates: 25.097702577°N 55.346769532°E

Falcon City of Wonders LLC
- فالكون ستي أوف وندورز
- Project logo
- Mission statement: The World In A City
- Commercial?: Yes
- Location: Wadi Al Safa 2, near Sheikh Mohammed Bin Zayed Road, Dubai
- Owner: Salem Ahmad Al Moosa Enterprises
- Founder: Salem Ahmad Al Moosa
- Country: United Arab Emirates
- Key people: Alharith Almoosa (Vice Chairman)
- Established: 16 February 2005
- Status: active
- Website: falconcity.com

Falcon City of Wonders (FCW) is a Dubai-based real-estate project was founded in 2005. The project include international-themed villas, spacious apartments, shopping malls, hotels, business offices, fine-dining restaurants, health clubs, spas, nurseries, schools and parks. When viewed from above, the development resembles a falcon, the national bird of the UAE, with the Falcon Mall forming the head of the falcon. As of 2022, the project has only completed the Left Wing of the city, with major portions still on hold. It is located in Wadi Al Safa 2, a short distance from the Global Village and the Arabian Ranches.

== Project history ==
Falcon City of Wonders L.L.C. was founded in 2005. After having a long delayed period in which 0% development was done, the project resumed in February 2016 after the funding of USD 2 Billion for new developments.

The organization with over 30 years of experience in the real estate sector covers an area of over 100 hectares, featuring residential, commercial, leisure and mixed-use developments, to cater to the needs of residents, tourists, investors, and visitors.

This mega project is inspired by Sheikh Mohammed bin Rashid Al Maktoum's strategic vision to develop Dubai as a "Global Tourist Destination" and as the region's main business, trading, retail and tourism hub. Falcon City of Wonders symbolizes the UAE's heritage. The original design of the master plan and smart city concept descended from the US-German architect Esat Farman.

In 2015, the project was showcased at the Expo 2020 and at Bombay Exhibition Centre. In September 2016, it was exhibited at Cityscape Global where project's stand was visited by Mohammed bin Rashid Al Maktoum and Humaid bin Rashid Al Nuaimi III (Ajman). It was certified by International Organization for Standardization under ISO 9001.

== Projects ==
=== Western and Eastern Villa Residences ===
Western and Eastern Villa Residences are internationally themed and contemporary villas. Both residences feature spacious residential villas that are located in the wings part of the city. The developed detached and semi detached Villas and Townhouses are of different international themes, including Andalusia, Aegean, Spanish Santa Fe, New World and contemporary styles. All villas range from 2 to 5 bedrooms.

=== Amenities ===
Community Center, Medical Center, Nursery, Hyper Market, Retail Outlets, Food Court and a Mosque with a large parking space. Community Club, Tennis Courts, Swimming Pool, Kids Playing Area, Library, Ladies’ Salon & Spa, Men's Spa, External Seating Area, Administration Room, Main Entrance Hall, Mini Mart, Restaurant, Squash Court, Gymnasium, Basketball Court, Landscaped Gardens, Car Parking, Guard Room and Space for Pocket Substation.

=== Eiffel Tower Dubai ===
Inspired by the Eiffel Tower in Paris, FCW is developing 'Dueiffel Tower Dubai' which will be a replica of the Eiffel Tower, encircled by Falcon Elysee to give a French lifestyle in Dubai.

=== Pyramid's Park ===
3D Model Design for The Pyramid's Park

Inspired by the Pyramids of Egypt, The Pyramid's Park consists of three pyramids - Dubai Grand Pyramid, Medium Pyramid and Small Pyramid, each of which is named after a star's name combined with the abbreviation SAAM. Dubai Grand Pyramid is named SAAMAntares after one of the most gigantic stars; Antares. The Meidum Pyramid to be named after the present North Pole star Polaris to become SAAM Polaris, while the Small Pyramid will be called SAAM Vega pointing to the future North Pole star Vega.

The axis rotates every 26,000 years, the North Star changes accordingly, and almost 12,000 years from now it will be Vega; the Future North Pole Star that will be pointed at by FCW Small Pyramid.

Dubai Grand Pyramid, "SAAMAntares" will consist of 35 floors. It will feature modern apartments and offices with the finest finishes. The Medium Pyramid "SAAMPolaris" is a 20-storey mixed-use development that offers residential, commercial, hospitality and leisure services. It includes hotel apartments of studios, one and two bedroom units. The Small Pyramid SAAMVega will host commercial services. It composes of 9 floors that feature business centers, apartments and offices.

=== Taj Arabia ===
Taj Arabia is inspired from the Taj Mahal in India. It is planned to be an actual replication of Taj Mahal and feature over 300 rooms. Taj Arabia is a luxury 6-star hotel that is designed to be the wedding destination of the world.

=== Leaning Tower of Dubai ===
The Leaning Tower of Dubai is planned to be a replica of and inspired by the Leaning Tower of Pisa in Italy. It features spacious and hotel apartments located at the center of the Town of Venice, where it is surrounded by retail shops and various restaurants.

=== Town Of Venice ===
Inspired by Venice in Italy, Falcon City's waterfront featuring Gondola rides, Outdoor Restaurants & Cafes. Town of Venice includes Retail Outlets & Residences of an Italian theme.

=== Great Wall of Dubai ===
Inspired by the Great Wall of China, Higher than a 3-storey building and stretching from one side of Falcon Fun City to the other, the Great Wall of Dubai will act as a jogging track that is 4.25 times bigger than the Olympic running track.

=== Falcon Fun City ===
Falcon Fun City is being developed next to the Falcon Mall, which shapes the head of the Falcon and features retail outlets, international restaurants and entertainment components.

=== Falcon City Towers ===
Falcon City Towers are located at the base of Falcon City, in the business district. It consist of 24 towers, having commercial, residential services.
