= Burj Al Alam =

Burj Al Alam برج العالم (Arabic)
- Artist's rendering of Burj Al Alam at night.

General information
- Status: On-hold (cancelled in 2013, this other in new design)
- Type: Office, hotel, restaurant, observation deck, retail
- Location: Business Bay, Dubai, United Arab Emirates
- Coordinates: 25°10′53.48″N 55°16′22.86″E
- Construction started: 12 November 2006
- Estimated completion: 2033
- Owner: Fortune Group

Height
- Antenna spire: 510 m (1,673 ft)

Technical details
- Floor count: 108
- Floor area: 4,000,000 sq ft (370,000 m^{2})
- Lifts/elevators: 30

Design and construction
- Architect: Nikken Sekkei
- Developer: Dubai Properties, Fortune Group
- Main contractor: Engineering Consultants Group; Arup Japan; D.G. Jones and Partners Dubai

The Burj Al Alam (English: "World Tower") was a proposed 108-story, 510 m (1,670 ft) hyperboloid skyscraper in the Business Bay area of Dubai, United Arab Emirates, though the project's roots are in a 101-storey design called "Fortune 101" and slated for the Dubai Marina area. It was designed to resemble a crystal flower. If constructed, it would have become one of the world's tallest buildings. The tower was one of the projects of the Fortune Group, which has a number of other projects in Dubai such as the Fortune Bay and Fortune Tower.

The proposed building plan contained 74 floors of office space, a retail area at the base, and a hotel and serviced apartments in the top 27 floors. A 5-star hotel section would contain the highest hotel rooms in the world. The building would also feature a 6-storey crown that contained a hammam, sky garden, and other club facilities.

Ground breaking occurred on 12 November 2006 with the tower slated for completion in 2009, but the project was dogged by delays in payments from investors due to the Great Recession. Construction of the tower was put on hold just after piling work on the foundations was completed in 2009. The main contractor for construction had not yet been selected when a report stated the structure was expected to be completed in 2012, after Burj Al Alam is however, work was suspended in November 2010 due to the consequences of the Great Recession. There was little sign of activity at the site after 2009, and no further statements regarding progress. The pit dug out for foundations was allowed to fill with water, and as of May 2013, satellite maps of the site revealed it had been filled in and levelled.

Sometime in 2012, the tower's official website expired and is now domain parked. By the end of 2013, the project had been officially cancelled. As of January 2015 the Burj Al Alam was listed by the Dubai Real Estate Regulatory Agency's Cancelled Real Estate Projects Committee as among the list of cancelled projects awaiting liquidation hearings.

The Fortune Group continue to own the property as of 2025, with Binghatti Skyrise resuming construction of the skyscraper in February 2025. A tentative completion in 2028 was set, however in November 2025 and February 2026 work was suspended.

== Construction gallery ==
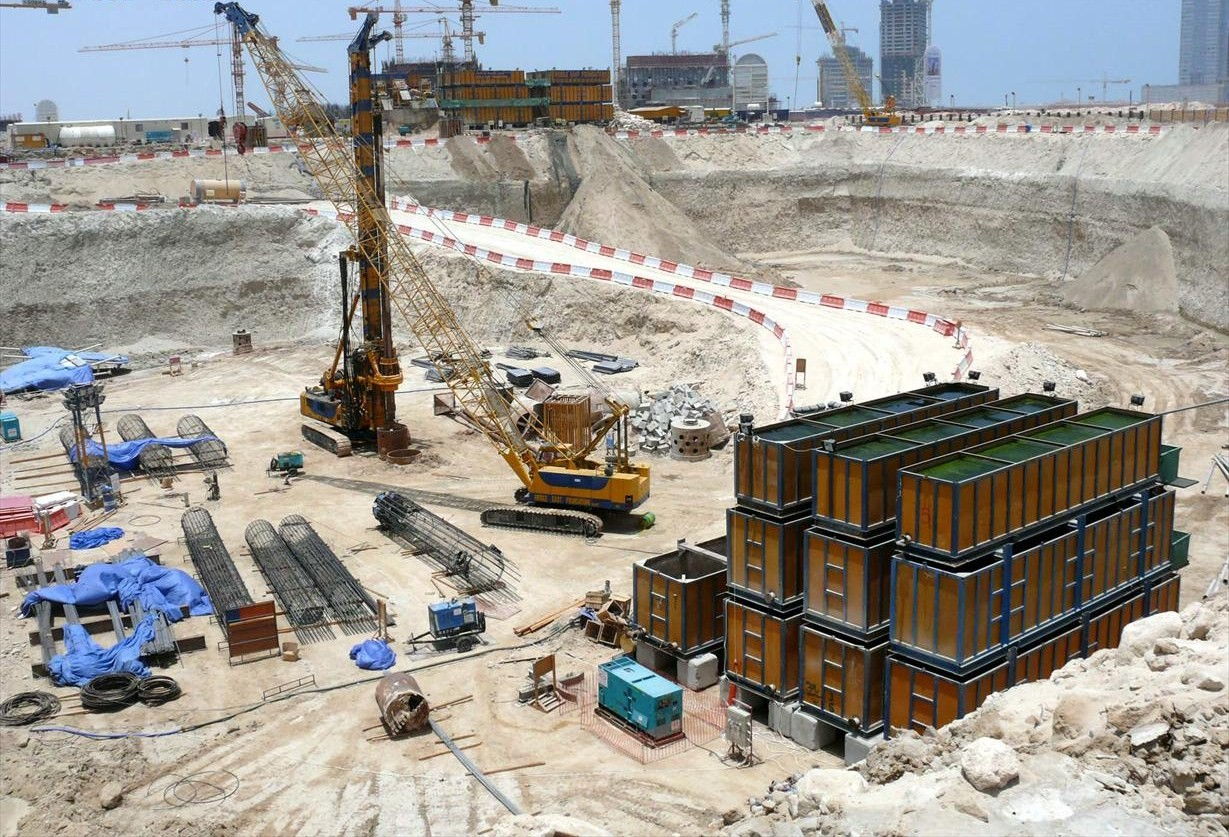
Piling works in progress, 13 June 2008

== See also ==
- List of tallest buildings in Dubai
- List of tallest buildings in Asia
- List of buildings with 100 floors or more
