= Ganesh Mylvaganam =

Emirati cricketer (born 1966)

Personal information
- Born: 1 August 1966 (age 59); Colombo, Sri Lanka
- Batting: Right-handed

International information
- National side: United Arab Emirates
- Source: CricInfo, 7 March 2006

Ganesh Mylvaganam (born 1 August 1966) is a Sri Lankan-born former cricketer who played for the United Arab Emirates national cricket team. He played three One Day Internationals for United Arab Emirates, all in the 1996 World Cup. He scored 36 runs at an average of 12.00. Before the World Cup, in the mid-1990s he was a batting member of UAE squad in associate and affiliate tournaments. He is now settled in Australia.
