= Dubai bid for the 2016 Summer Olympics =

Bids for the 2016 Summer Olympics
Overview
- Games of the XXXI Olympiad

Details
- City: Dubai, United Arab Emirates
- NOC: United Arab Emirates National Olympic Committee

Previous Games hosted
- None

Dubai, a city in the United Arab Emirates, announced an interest in bidding for the right to host the 2016 Summer Olympics. Winning the 2016 Olympic bid could have increased the speed of Dubai's emergence as a leading world city. Dubai did not submit a bid.

== Factors for the bid ==
Dubai's economic and structural development was seen to play in its favor. The construction of the Dubai Sports City and a multitude of new hotels – such as the Burj al-Arab – would also boost its chances.

Another factor in favour of the Dubai bid was its location – although this was also a major disadvantage (see below). At the time of bidding, there had never been a host country from South America, Africa, South Asia or the Middle East, leading the International Olympic Committee eager to grant a city in one of these regions the chance to host the Games. However, they were more eager in granting it to poorer nations than the UAE.

== Factors against the bid ==
One main concern with the Dubai bid was the weather. During the summer, city temperatures can reach 45 degrees Celsius (113 degrees Fahrenheit), a potential disadvantage to the athletes. However, this would be somewhat improved if the Games were to be held in the early autumn or late spring. Also, in terms of sporting history, the UAE has had a small presence in prior Olympiads, having won one medal.

== Outcome ==
Dubai never submitted a bid. The nearby city of Doha, Qatar submitted a bid. Rio de Janeiro was chosen to host the 2016 Summer Olympics.
