= Dubai Medical University =

Coordinates: 25°15′1″N 55°25′2″E

- كلية دبي الطبية
- Former name: Dubai Medical College for Girls
- Type: Private
- Established: 1986
- Chairman: Saeed Bin Ahmed Al Lootah
- Dean: Prof. Mohammed Galal El Din
- Location: Muhaisnah, Dubai, UAE
- Website: Official website

Dubai Medical University (DMU) is a private medical university in Dubai, United Arab Emirates. It was the first private medical college in the UAE. It was founded in 1986 as Dubai Medical College for Girls.
