= Cargo Plus Aviation =

Cargo airline based in the United Arab Emirates

IATA	ICAO	Call sign
8L	CGP	—
- Founded: 2001
- Fleet size: 2
- Headquarters: Dubai, United Arab Emirates
- Website: http://www.techno-sites.com/cargo/contact-us.htm

Cargo Plus Aviation was a cargo airline based in Dubai, United Arab Emirates. It operated ad hoc flights to Asia, Africa and eastern Europe.

== History ==
The airline was established in July 2001 and started operations in August 2001.

== Services ==
Cargo Plus Aviation operated freight services to the following international scheduled destinations (at January 2005): Kano, Khartoum, Lagos, Mumbai, Nairobi, N'Djamena and Sharjah.

== Accidents and incidents ==
In March 2005, a Boeing 707 operated by Cargo Plus Aviation on behalf of Ethiopian Airlines crashed in Lake Victoria. The plane crashed while making an emergency landing in Entebbe, Uganda, while en route from Addis Ababa to Lomé. Some people aboard sustained injuries and the plane was destroyed, but there were no fatalities.

== Fleet ==
The Cargo Plus Aviation fleet consisted of the following aircraft:

- 1 Boeing 707-320C
- 1 Douglas DC-8-63F
