= Middle East Public Relations Association =

Middle East Public Relations Association جمعية الشرق الأوسط للعلاقات العامة
- Abbreviation: MEPRA
- Headquarters: Abu Dhabi
- Location: UAE
- President: Mazen Nahawi
- Website: www.mepra.org

The Middle East Public Relations Association (MEPRA) is a non-profit organisation, that represents the interests of the Middle East public relations industry. It is registed at Abu Dhabi in the United Arab Emirates. MEPRA's purpose is to highlight the strategic role of public relations in the Arab world and help set high standards for quality and ethical conduct by consultancy firms. The Association provides a single point of contact for government, the business community and the media to talk to the region's growing PR industry. As of June 2008, MEPRA's membership consisted of 26 public relations firms with nearly 100 offices in more than 14 Arab states. MEPRA is a member of the International Committee of Public Relations Consultancies Associations (ICCO), which represents PR consultancies across 29 countries. MEPRA hosts an annual awards ceremony for PR companies in the Middle East.
