= Imtiaz Abbasi =

Emirati cricketer (born 1968)

Personal information
- Born: June 9, 1968 (age 58); Peshawar, Khyber Pakhtunkhwa, Pakistan
- Batting: Right-handed
- Role: Wicketkeeper, batsman

Career statistics
Competition	ODI
Matches	7
Runs scored	12
Batting average	6.00
100s/50s	0/0
Top score	6*
Catches/stumpings	4/2
- Source: CricInfo, 15 August 2022

Imtiaz Abbasi (Urdu: امتیاز عباسی), (born 9 June 1968) is a Pakistani-born former cricketer who played for the United Arab Emirates national cricket team. As a wicket-keeper, Imtiaz Abbasi made his mark in his first-class debut for Karachi against Quetta in the 1988 Patron's Trophy where he held seven catches, a record for domestic Pakistani cricket. However, he did not play another first-class game, and later emigrated to the United Arab Emirates, for whom he first played representative cricket in the 1994 ICC Trophy, where he was declared best wicket-keeper of the competition after claiming 22 dismissals in nine matches. He also kept wickets for the UAE in the 1996 World Cup, where he played in 6 One Day Internationals.
