= Dhadna =

Dhadna ضدنا
- Location within United Arab Emirates
- Coordinates: 25°31′21″N 56°21′20″E
- Country: United Arab Emirates
- Emirate: Fujairah
- Elevation: 94 m (308 ft)

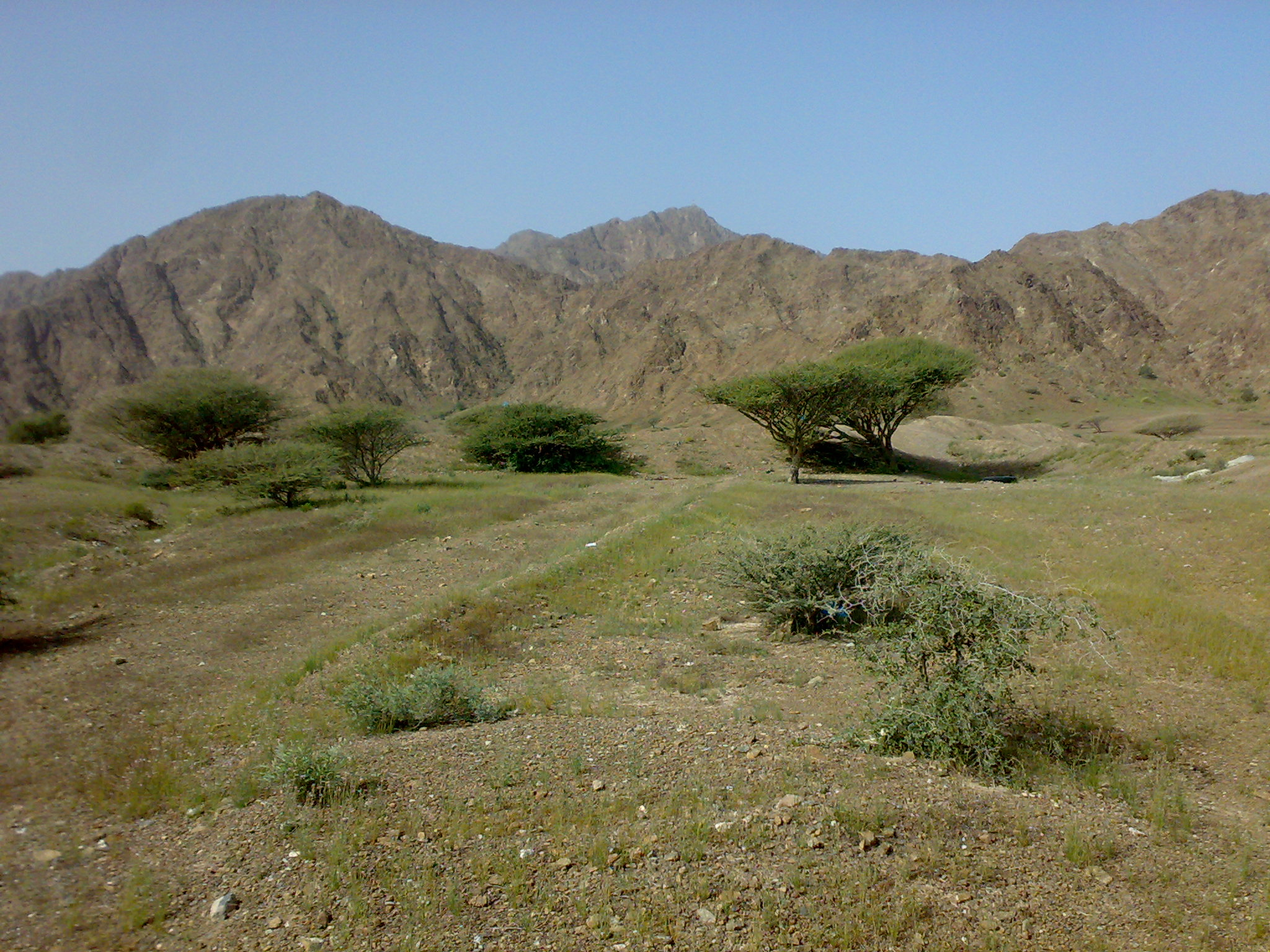
Shrubs and hatta mountain range, by highway 99, Dadna municipality, emirate of Fujairah, eastern UAE.

Dhadna (Arabic: ضدنا) is a village in Fujairah, United Arab Emirates, located 45 kilometres (28 mi) north of the Fujairah City centre. The area's economy has depended since ancient times on agriculture and fishing, in which much of the population works today. The village is known for its large supply of water and has been a site for many farms of the royal families across the Emirates.

== History ==
In February 1943 a British Wellington bomber flying out of Sharjah was lost at Dhadna. A monument to that crash and the death of the Wellington’s navigator stands there today.

The village was the site of a major fire that broke out on January 22, 2018 where seven members of an Emirati family died. The deceased were siblings, four girls and three boys aged between five and 13, who died in their sleep due to suffocation.
