= Mag 218 Tower =

Skyscraper in Dubai, United Arab Emirates

- Mag 218 Tower in 2015

- Location within United Arab Emirates

General information
- Type: Residential
- Architectural style: Modern
- Location: Dubai, United Arab Emirates
- Coordinates: 25°05′17″N 55°08′56″E
- Construction started: 2006
- Completed: 2010

Height
- Roof: 231.8 m (760 ft)

Technical details
- Floor count: 66

Design and construction
- Architecture firm: Dar Al-Handasah

Other information
- Number of rooms: 534
- Parking: 7 floors

The Mag 218 Tower is a 66-floor tower in the Dubai Marina in Dubai, United Arab Emirates. The tower has a total structural height of 231.8 m (760 ft) and 534 residential and commercial units.

== History ==
Construction began in 2006 and concluded in 2010. 55 of the 66 floors are residential area, the first 7 floors are used for parking. It was built by architecture firm Dar Al-Handasah and has a modern style throughout the whole design.

== Gallery ==
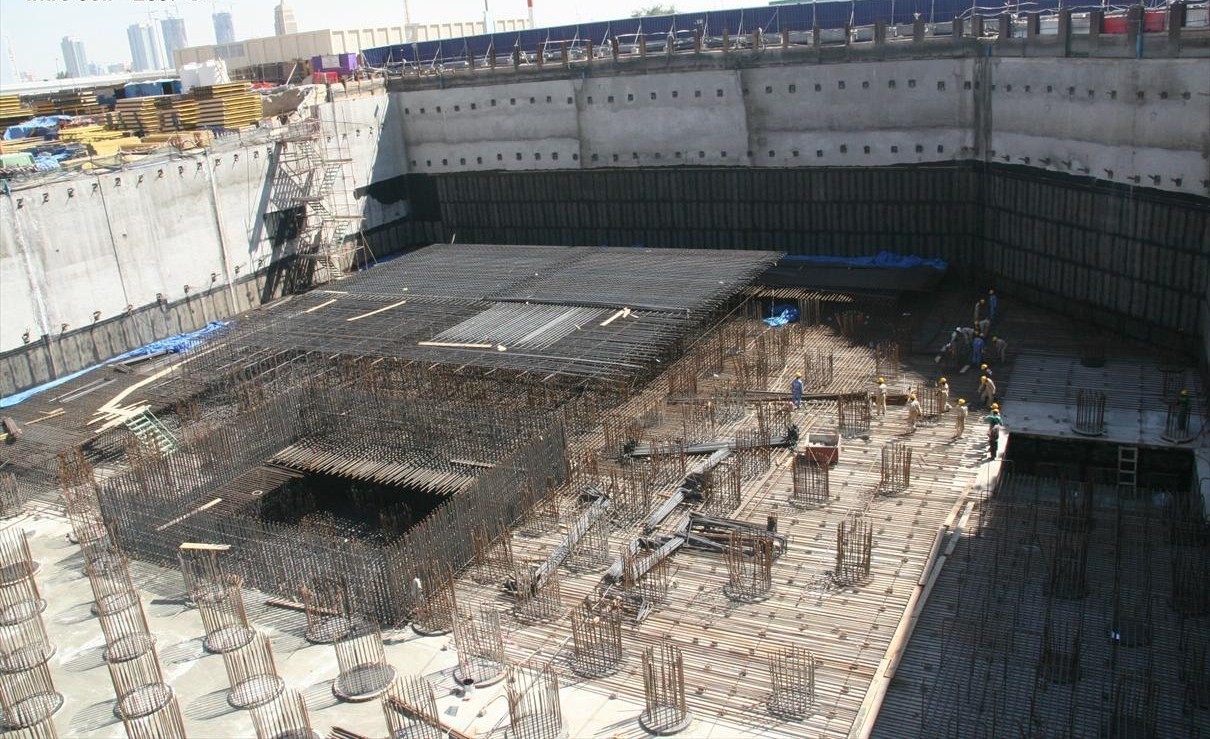
February 16, 2007

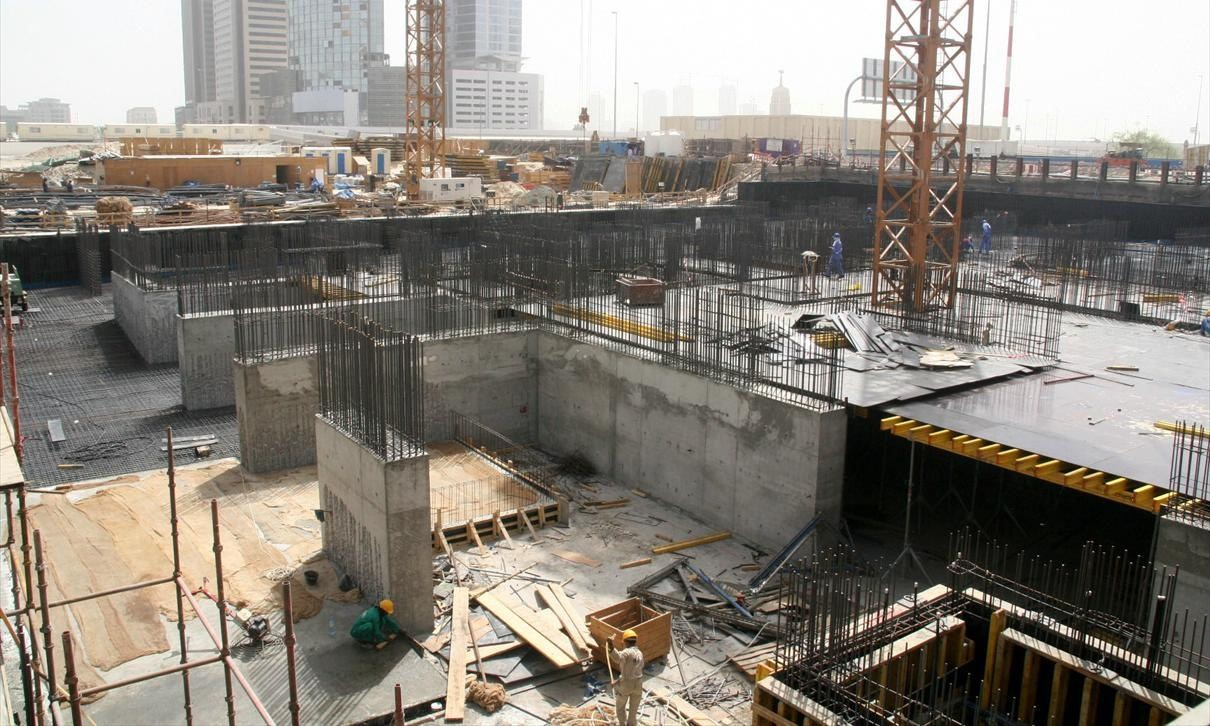
May 18, 2007

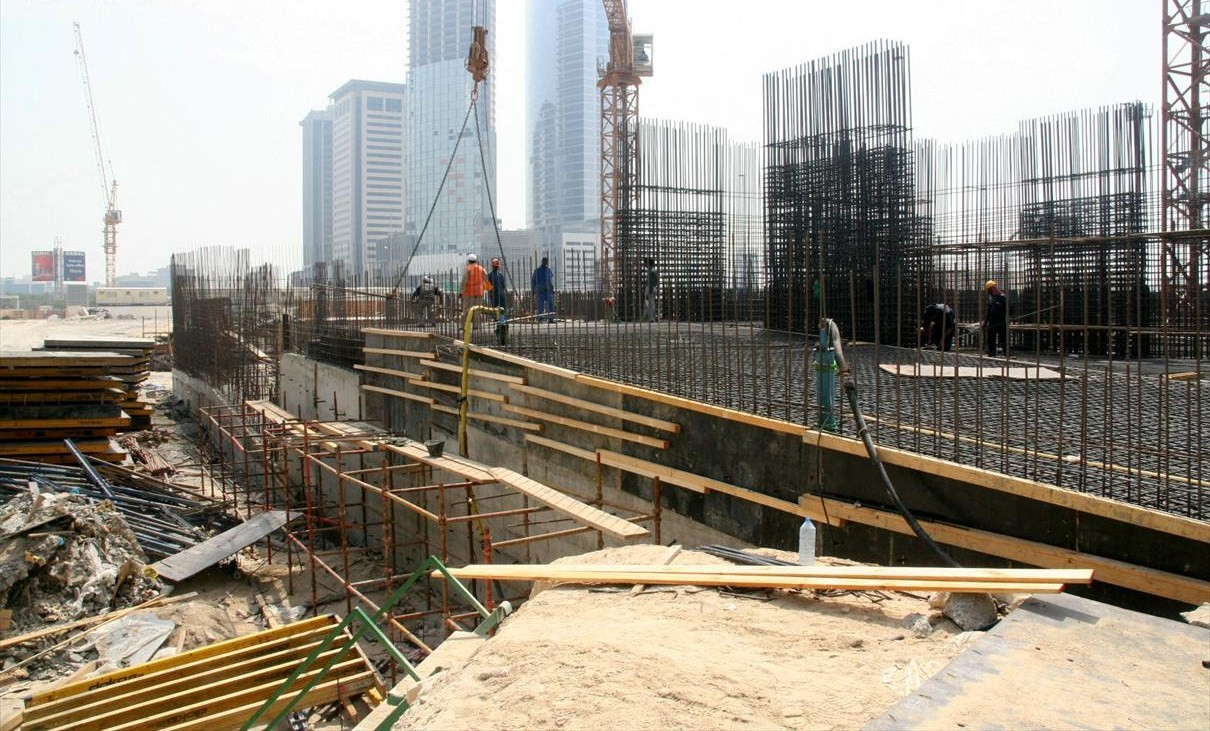
June 15, 2007

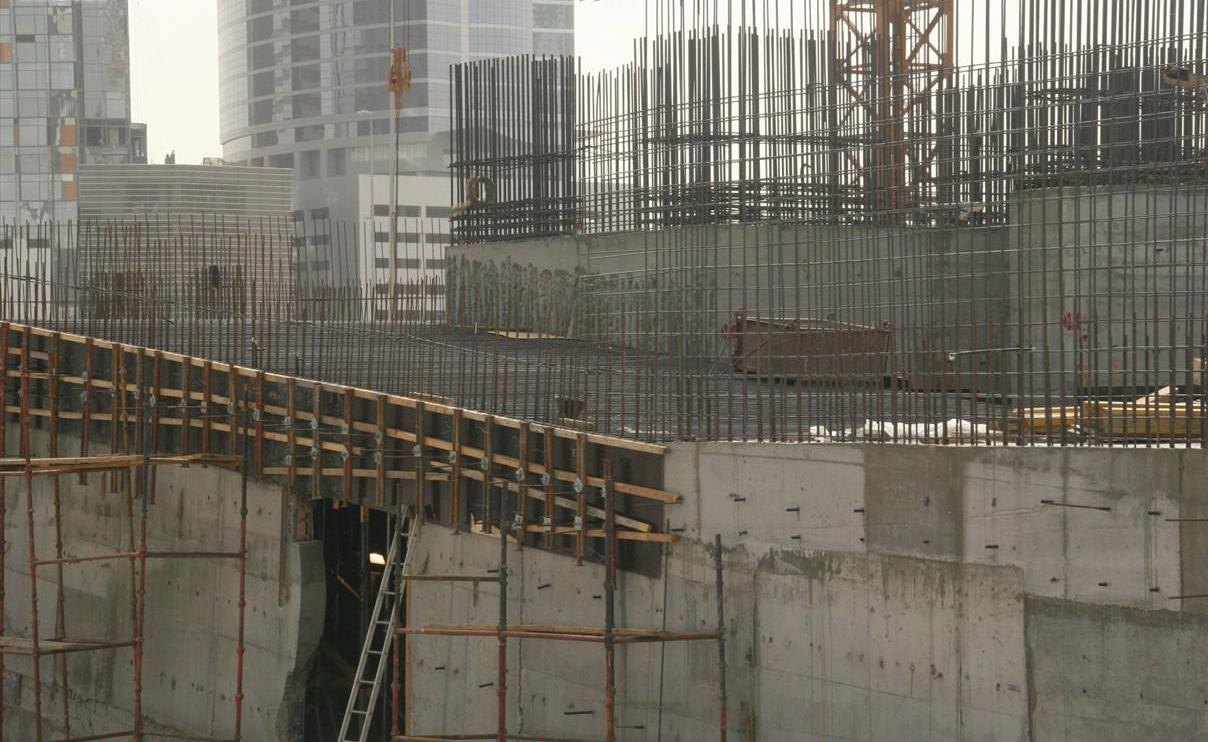
June 29, 2007

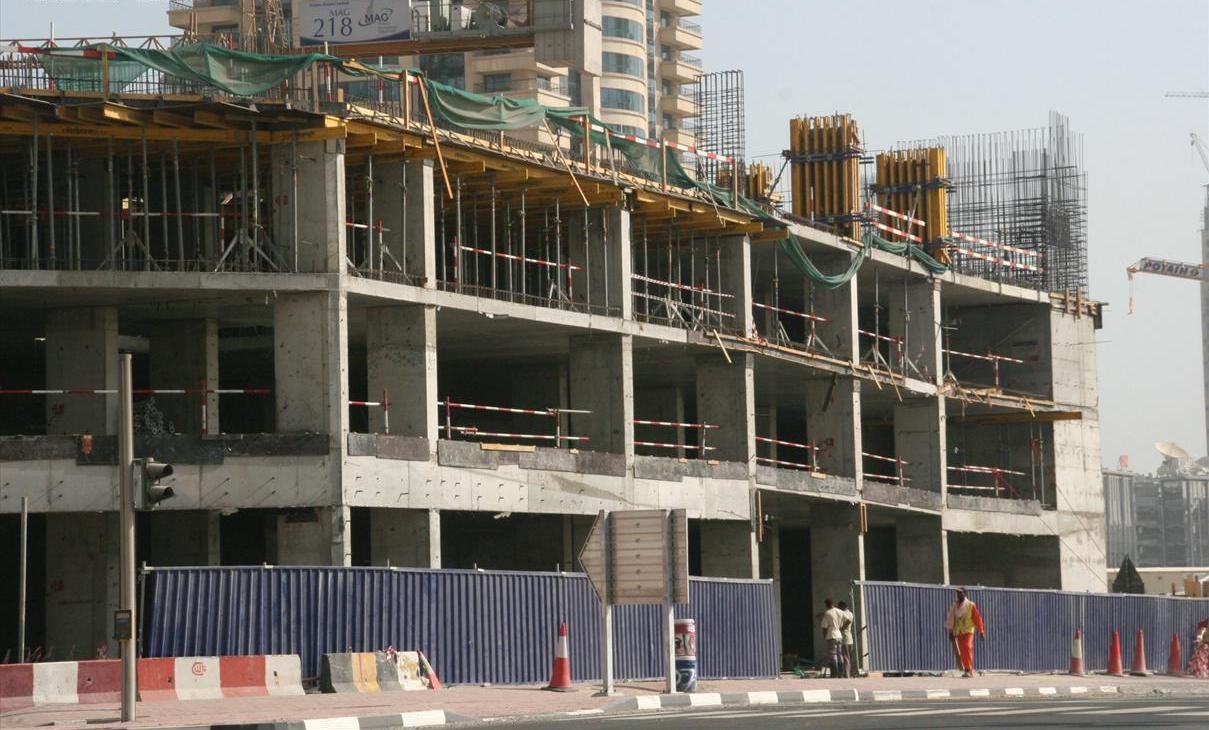
August 17, 2007

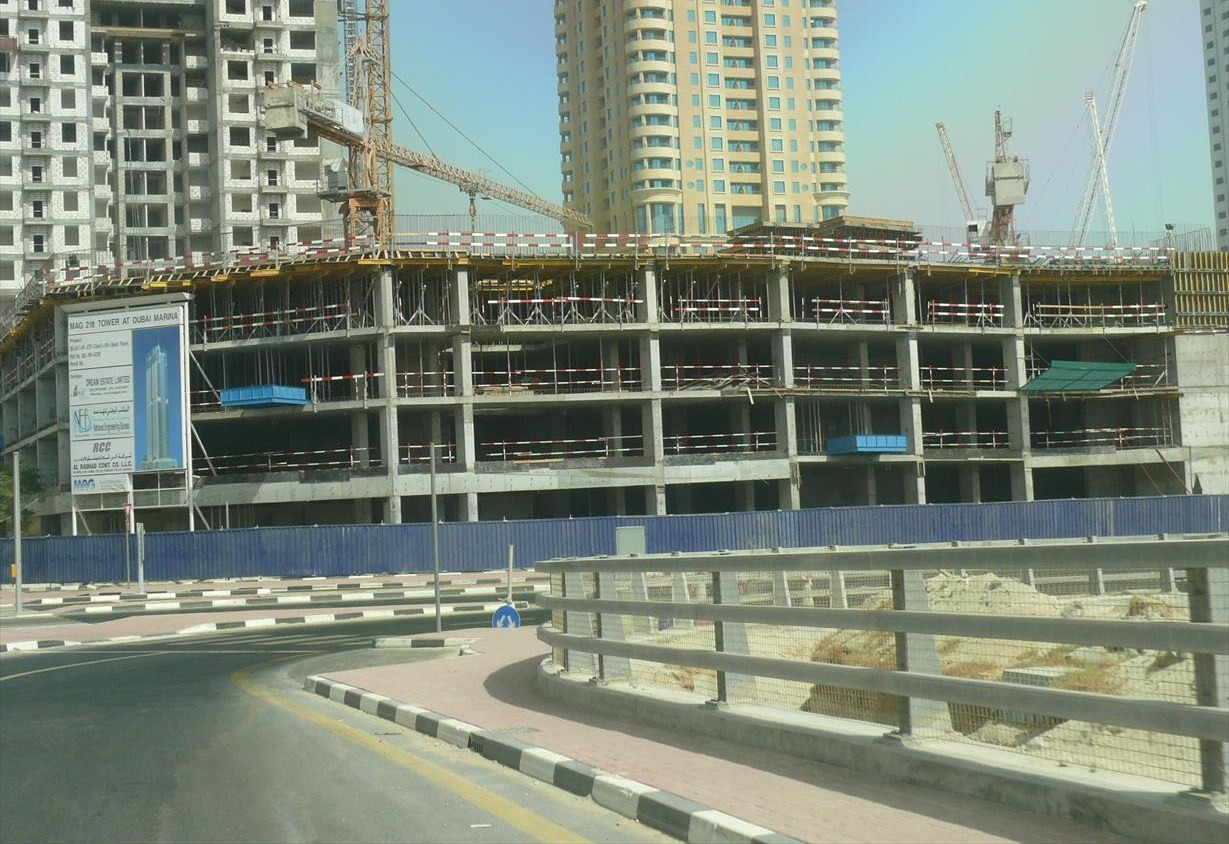
September 11, 2007

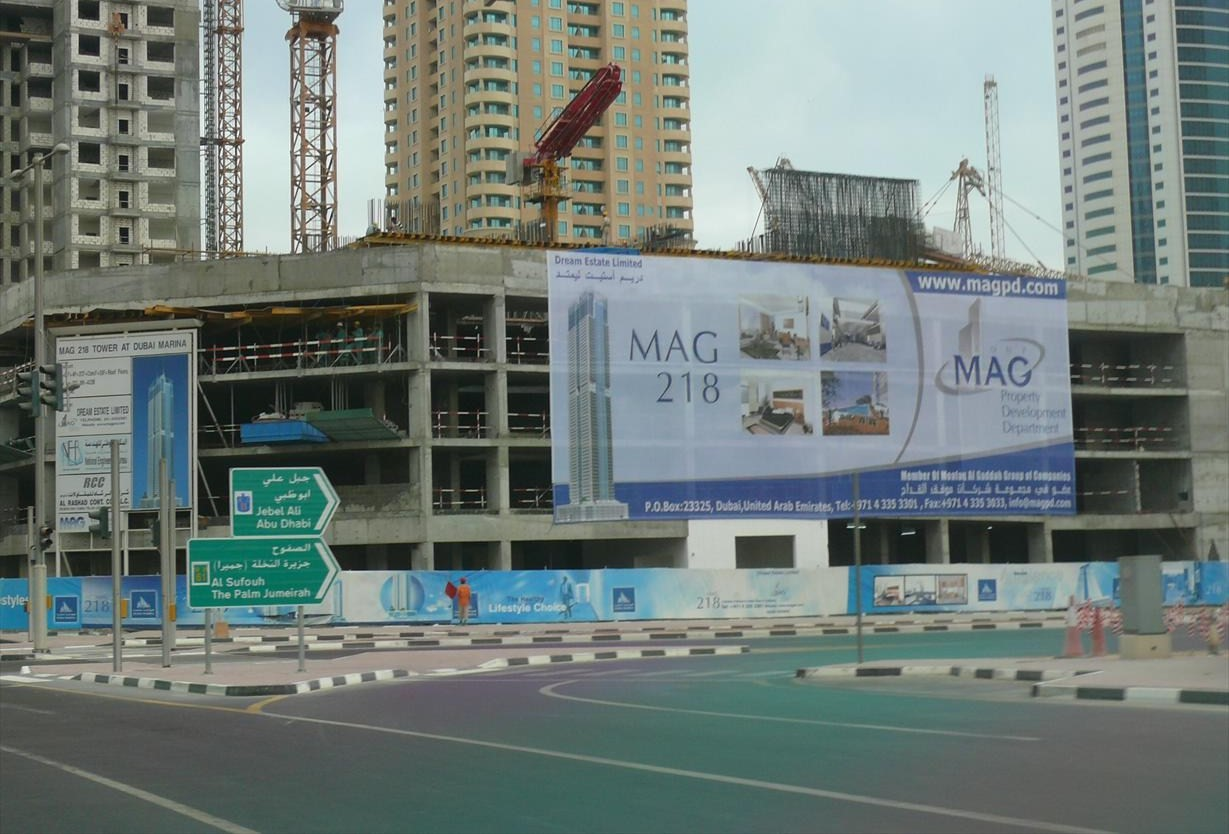
November 2, 2007

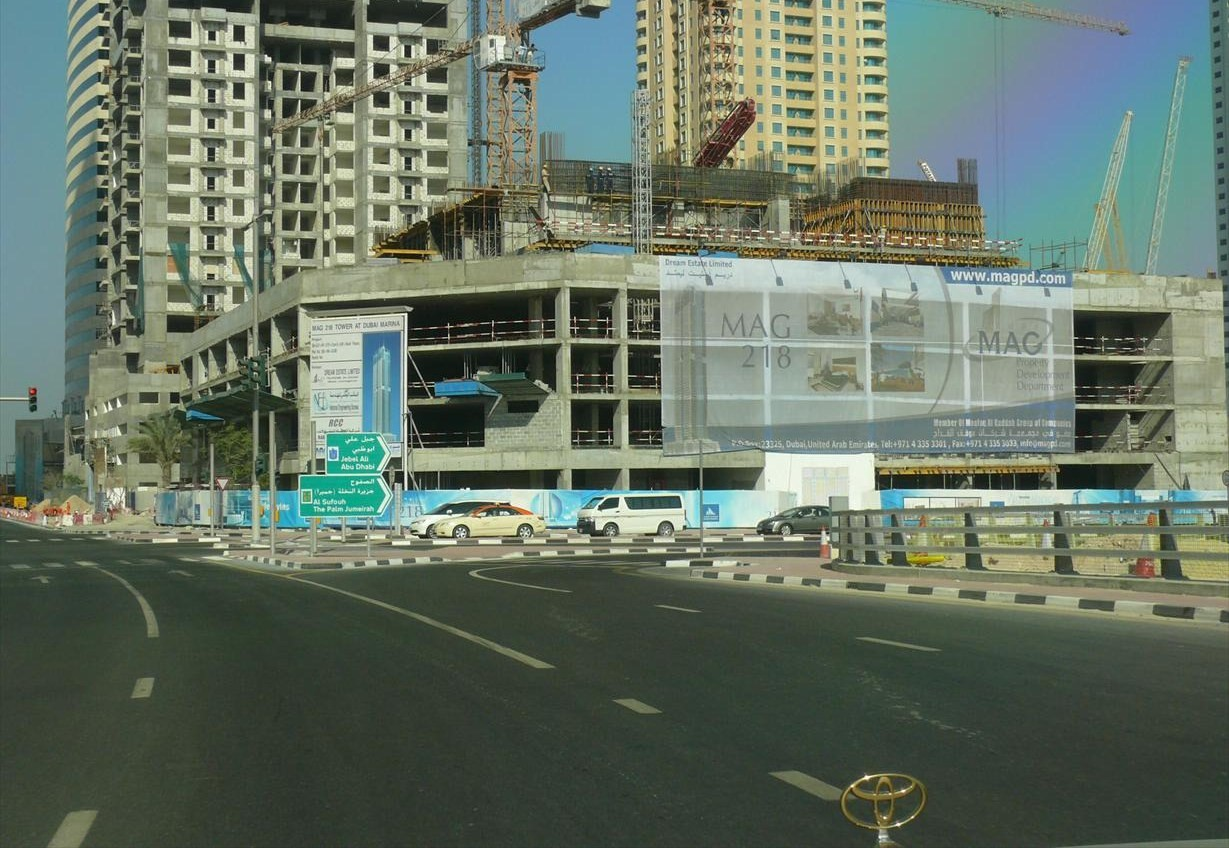
December 6, 2007

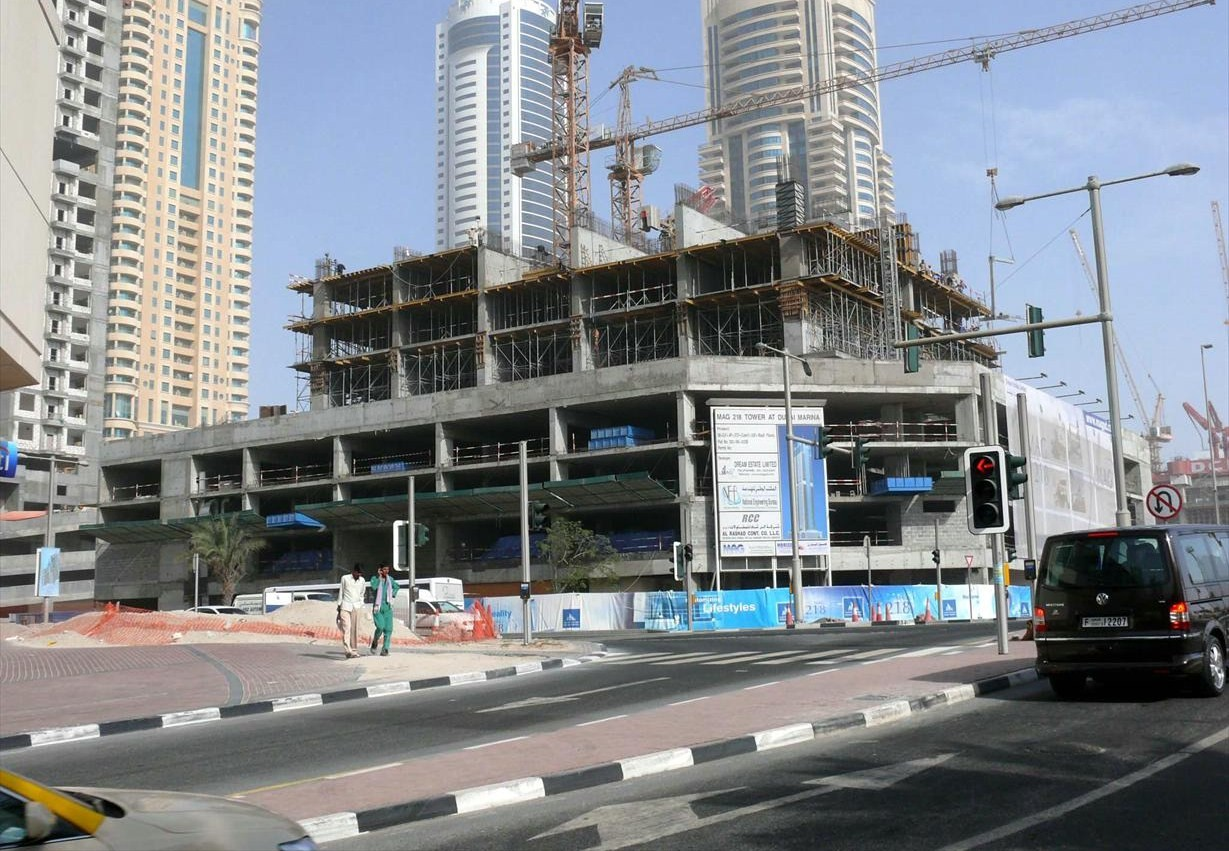
January 4, 2008

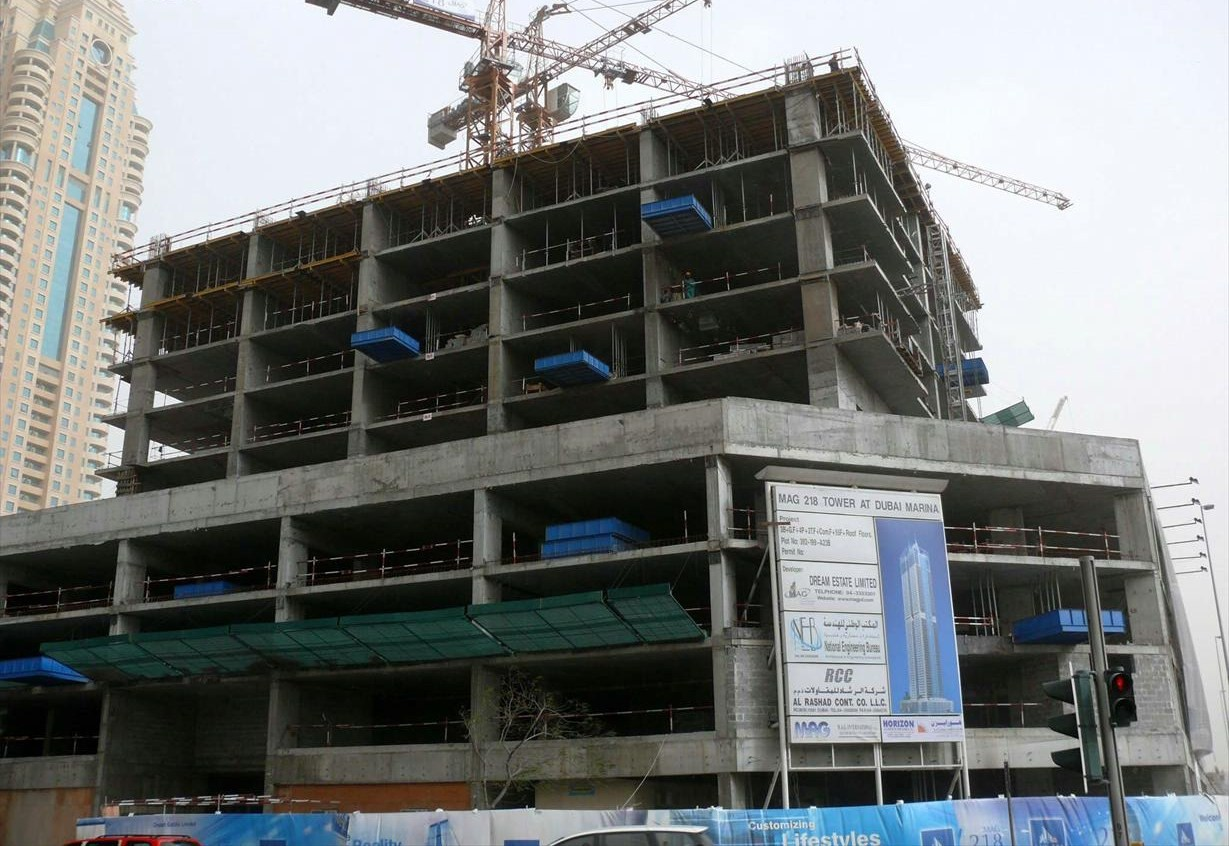
February 1, 2008

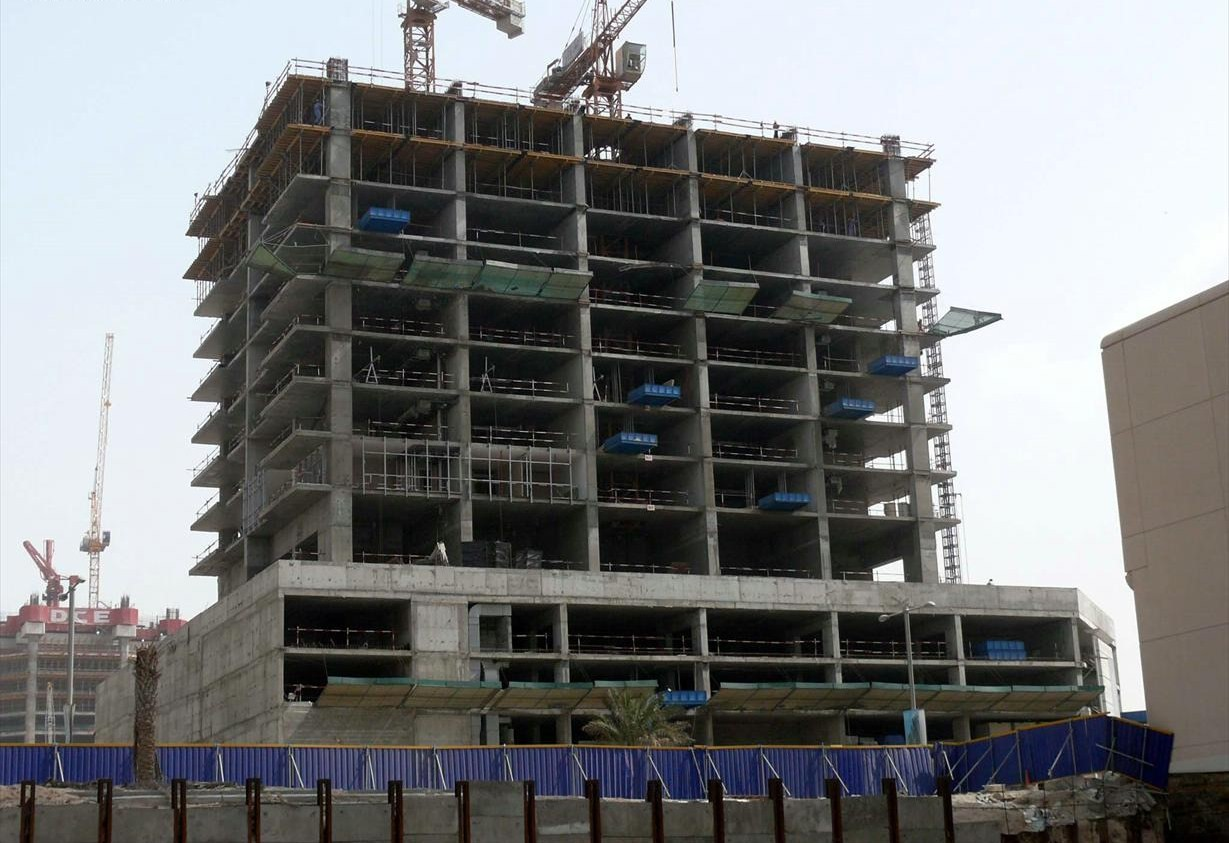
March 7, 2008

== See also ==
- List of tallest buildings in Dubai
- List of tallest buildings in the United Arab Emirates
- List of tallest residential buildings in Dubai
