= Daftah =

Daftah دفته
- Location within United Arab Emirates
- Coordinates: 25°16′27″N 56°11′0″E
- Country: United Arab Emirates
- Emirate: Ras Al Khaimah
- Elevation: 629 m (2,064 ft)

Daftah (Arabic: دفته) is a village near Masafi in the emirate of Ras Al Khaimah, United Arab Emirates (UAE).

The village is located on the Masafi to Fujairah highway, which follows a route along the Wadi Ham (وادي حام). It is also located off the Sharjah-Khor Fakkan highway, constructed by contractor Halcrow. The $1.6 billion road, opened in 2019, connects Daftah with Khor Fakkan through a series of five tunnels through the Hajar Mountains, passing the newly redeveloped village of Shis. These include the Al Sidra Tunnel, which at 2,700 metres, is the longest covered mountain tunnel in the Middle East.

Although the village today is located along the roadside in a strip development, the old village of Daftah lies behind the new development, and was traditionally home to the Naqbiyin tribe.

== Gallery ==
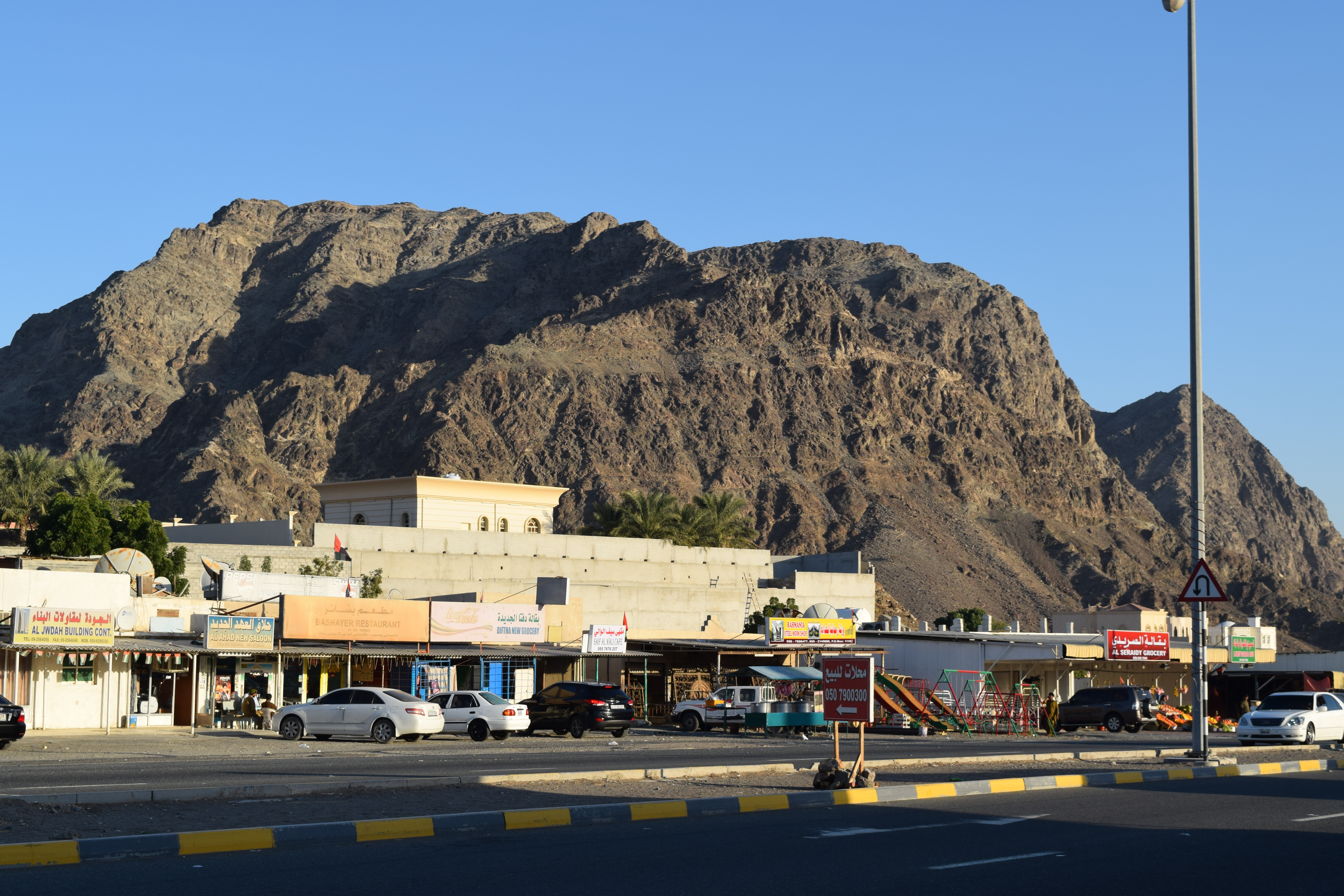
Daftah Mountain Valley Shops

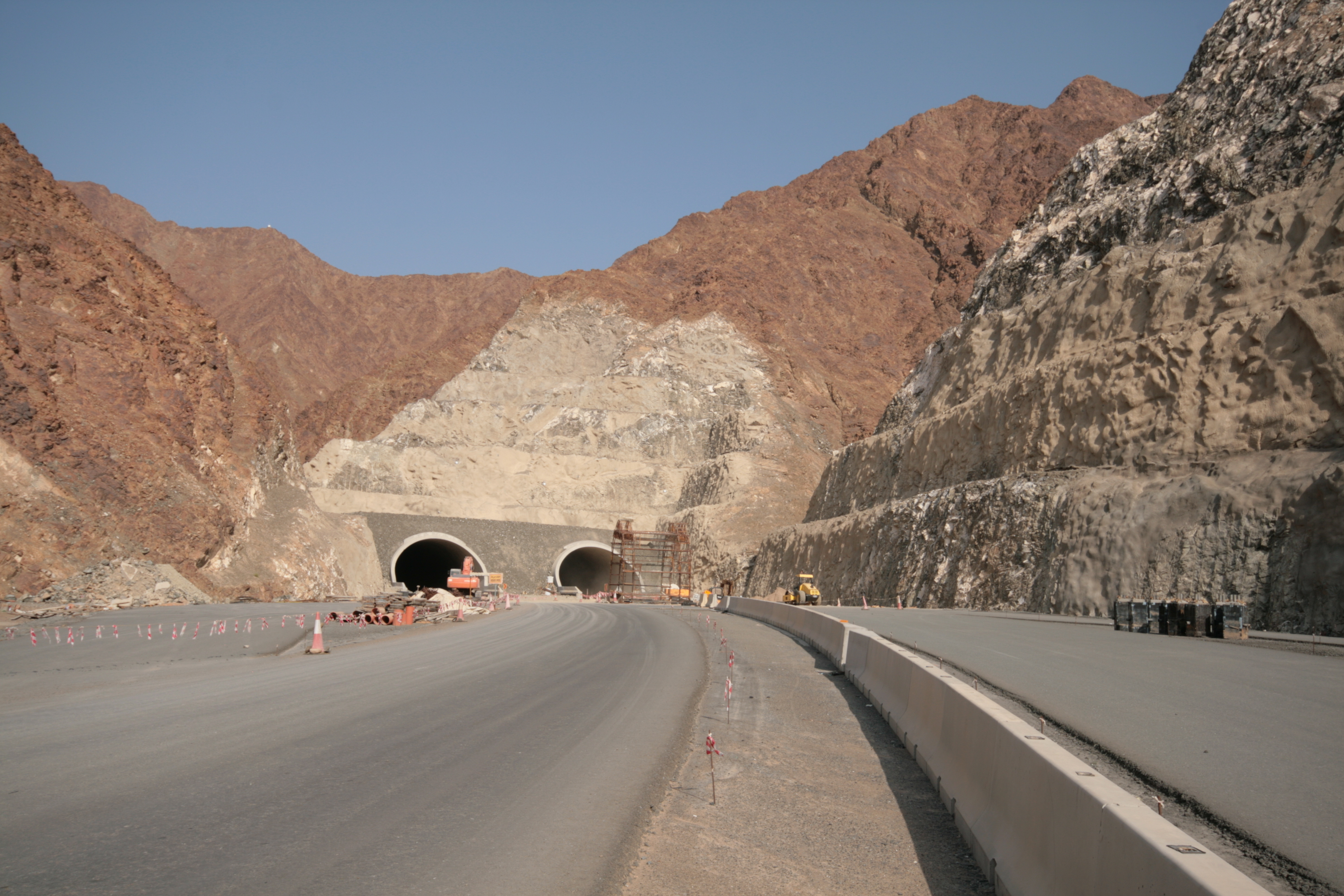
The Daftah-Khor Fakkan Road under construction
