= Vijay Mehra (Emirati cricketer) =

Emirati cricketer (born 1963)

Personal information
- Born: 17 October 1963 (age 63); New York City, United States
- Batting: Right-handed

Career statistics
Competition	ODI
Matches	6
Runs scored	92
Batting average	18.39
100s/50s	0/0
Top score	43
Catches/stumpings	1/–
- Source: CricInfo, 15 August 2022

Vijay Mehra (born 17 October 1963) is an American former cricketer who played for the United Arab Emirates (UAE) cricket team. He played six One Day Internationals for the UAE. Mehra was a wicket-keeper and batsmen. He is the great-nephew of the Delhi cricketer and administrator Ram Prakash.

He attended St. Columba's School, Delhi and St. Stephen's College, Delhi.

During the 1996 limited over cricket World Cup, he was described as the "Sachin Tendulkar of UAE cricket". Indeed, his debut innings was a stroke-filled 43 against an Indian side that featured Tendulkar.
