= Sameer Zia =

Emirati cricketer (born 1981)

Personal information
- Full name: Sameer Zia
- Born: September 8, 1981 (age 45); Dubai, United Arab Emirates
- Height: 6 ft 2 in (1.88 m)
- Batting: Right-handed
- Bowling: Right-arm off spin
- Role: All-rounder

International information
- National side: UAE
- Only ODI (cap 29): 17 July 2004 v Sri Lanka
- ODI shirt no.: 77

Career statistics
Competition	ODI	FC	LA
Matches	1	6	2
Runs scored	2	140	3
Batting average	–	17.50	3.00
100s/50s	0/0	0/1	0/0
Top score	2*	56	2*
Balls bowled	60	507	120
Wickets	1	8	1
Bowling average	44.00	34.12	87.00
5 wickets in innings	0	0	0
10 wickets in match	0	0	0
Best bowling	1/44	2/19	1/44
Catches/stumpings	2/–	2/–	2/–
- Source: CricketArchive, August 23 2007

Sameer Zia (born 8 September 1981) is a former international cricketer who represented the United Arab Emirates national cricket team. An all-rounder, he was a right-handed batsman and right-arm off-spinner.

International career

Zia made his One Day International (ODI) debut against the Sri Lanka national cricket team in July 2004 at Dambulla during the Asia Cup. He later made his first-class debut in September 2004 in the ICC Intercontinental Cup against Canada in Toronto.

Coaching career

Since 2010, Zia has been based in Scotland, where he has been involved in club cricket and coaching. He holds an Advanced Level 3 coaching qualification awarded by the England and Wales Cricket Board.

He has also worked part-time with CricketScotland as a support coach for the Western Warriors Under-15 and Under-17 age-group squads, contributing to regional player development pathways.
