= Fahad Usman =

United Arab Emirates cricketer (born 1976)

Cricket information
- Batting: Left-handed
- Bowling: Legbreak
- Source: CricInfo

Fahad Usman (born 2 September 1976 in Karachi, Sindh, Pakistan) is a Pakistani-born former cricketer who played for the United Arab Emirates national cricket team. He played for the Pakistan national under-19 cricket team during the 1995–96 season.

Fahad Usman played one first-class match for Karachi Whites in the 1997–98 Quaid-e-Azam Trophy before emigrating to the United Arab Emirates. He later continued his first-class career with one game for the UAE in the 2004 ICC Intercontinental Cup and two games in the 2005 version of the competition. His two One Day Internationals came in the 2004 Asia Cup. He also competed for his adopted nation in the 1994 ICC Six-Nations Challenge and the 2005 ICC Trophy.
