= Abu Dhabi Islands Archaeological Survey =

1992 archaeological survey mission

The Abu Dhabi Islands Archaeological Survey (ADIAS) was established in 1992 on the instruction of the late President Sheikh Zayed bin Sultan Al Nahyan to survey for record and, where appropriate, excavate archaeological sites on the coast and islands of Abu Dhabi. Its founding Executive Director was Peter Hellyer. Since 1992, ADIAS has identified thousands of sites or groups of sites on the coast and islands of Abu Dhabi.

ADIAS is under the patronage of Lieutenant-General Sheikh Mohammed bin Zayed Al Nahyan, Chief of Staff of the UAE Armed Forces and Crown Prince of Abu Dhabi.
