= Abdul Rehman (Emirati cricketer) =

United Arab Emirates cricketer (born 1987)

Personal information
- Born: 2 January 1987 (age 39); Ajman, Emirate of Ajman
- Batting: Right-handed
- Role: Wicket-keeper

International information
- National side: United Arab Emirates (2004–2011)
- Only ODI (cap 17): 16 July 2004 v India

Career statistics
Competition	ODI	FC	LA	T20
Matches	1	7	17	9
Runs scored	1	221	266	85
Batting average	1.00	17.00	29.55	10.62
100s/50s	0/0	0/1	0/2	0/0
Top score	1	65	71	20
Catches/stumpings	0/0	14/0	19/8	3/4
- Source: CricInfo, 21 August 2020

Abdul Rehman (born 2 January 1987) is a former cricketer who played for the United Arab Emirates national cricket team between 2004 and 2011.

A wicketkeeper and useful lower-order right-handed batsman, Abdul Rehman was plucked from the obscurity of the UAE Under-17 squad into the national team for the 2004 Asia Cup.

He made his One Day International debut for the UAE against a strong Indian team but was not selected in the team for the next game against tournament hosts Sri Lanka.

His last international outing was against Afghanistan in an ICC Intercontinental Cup game in October 2011.
