= Abu al Abyad =

Island in the United Arab Emirates

Abu Al Abyad Island
Native name: جزيرة أبو الأبيض
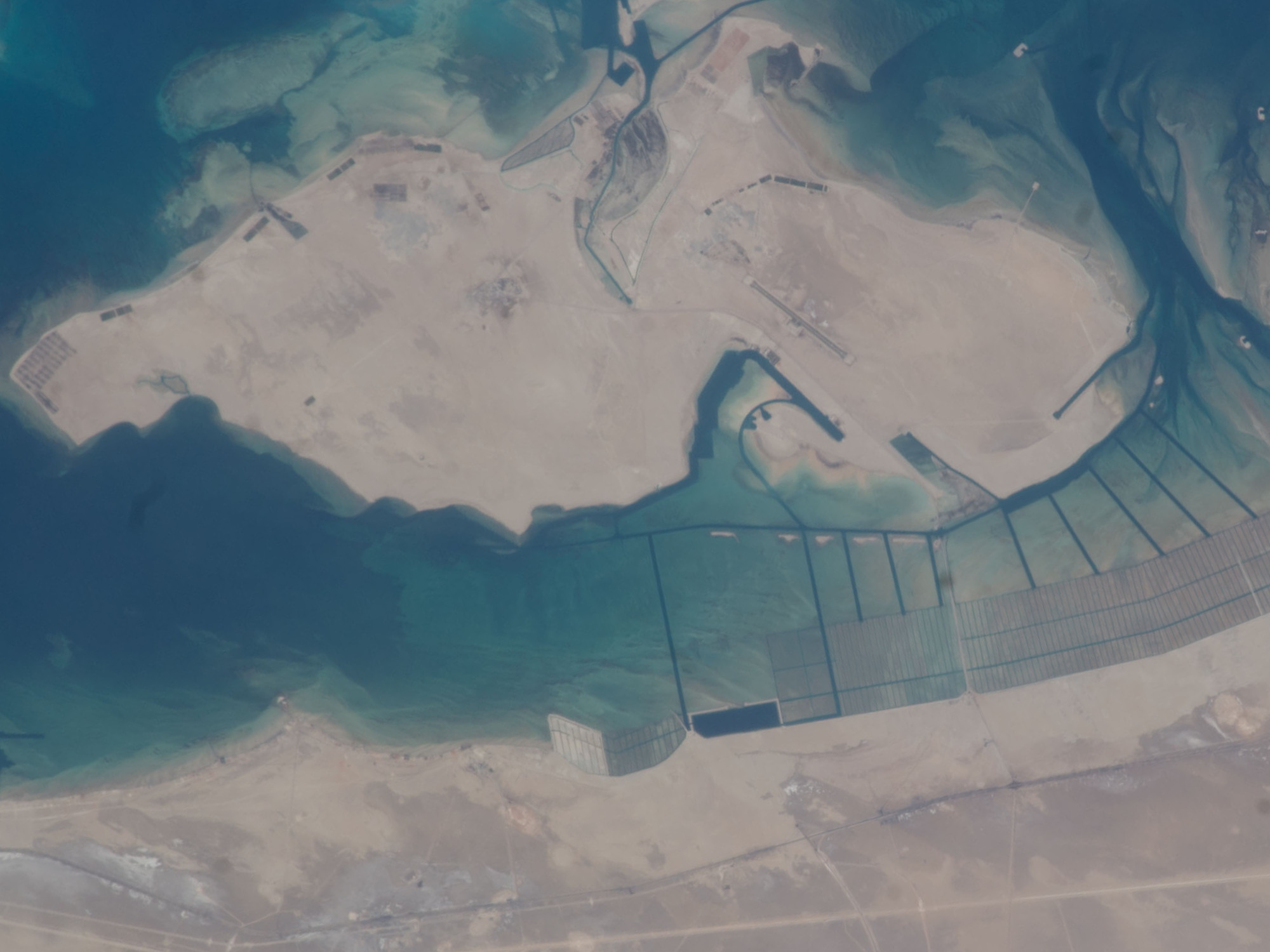

- Location within United Arab Emirates

Geography
- Location: Persian Gulf
- Coordinates: 24°11′45″N 53°48′15″E

Administration
- United Arab Emirates
- Emirate: Abu Dhabi

Abu al Abyad ( Arabic : جزيرة أبو الأبيض ) (formerly Abu al Jirab) is the largest of about 200 islands along the coast of the United Arab Emirates.

== Geography ==
The island is situated in the emirate of Abu Dhabi. Its area is 306 square kilometres (118 sq mi). Settlements on the island include Al Jirab, Bū Līfīyāt, and Jazirah. The eastern section of the island is called Al Jirab (24°11′25″N 53°53′46″E), while the western section is called Muqaysiţ (24°11′20″N 53°45′08″E), and the westernmost point of the island is known as Ra's Muqay (24°10′04″N 53°37′24″E).

Despite its proximity to the capital, Abu al Abyad is largely undeveloped and has been described as representing the coastal landscape of the United Arab Emirates as it has existed for millennia. Its terrain is a mosaic of salt flats, gravel and sandy desert, fringed by a narrow strip of mud and marine sand that supports mangroves.

== Environment ==
The island has been designated an Important Bird Area (IBA) by BirdLife International because it supports populations of western reef egrets, crab-plovers and Saunders's terns.
