= Jumeirah Islands =

Jumeirah Islands جزر الجميرا
- Community
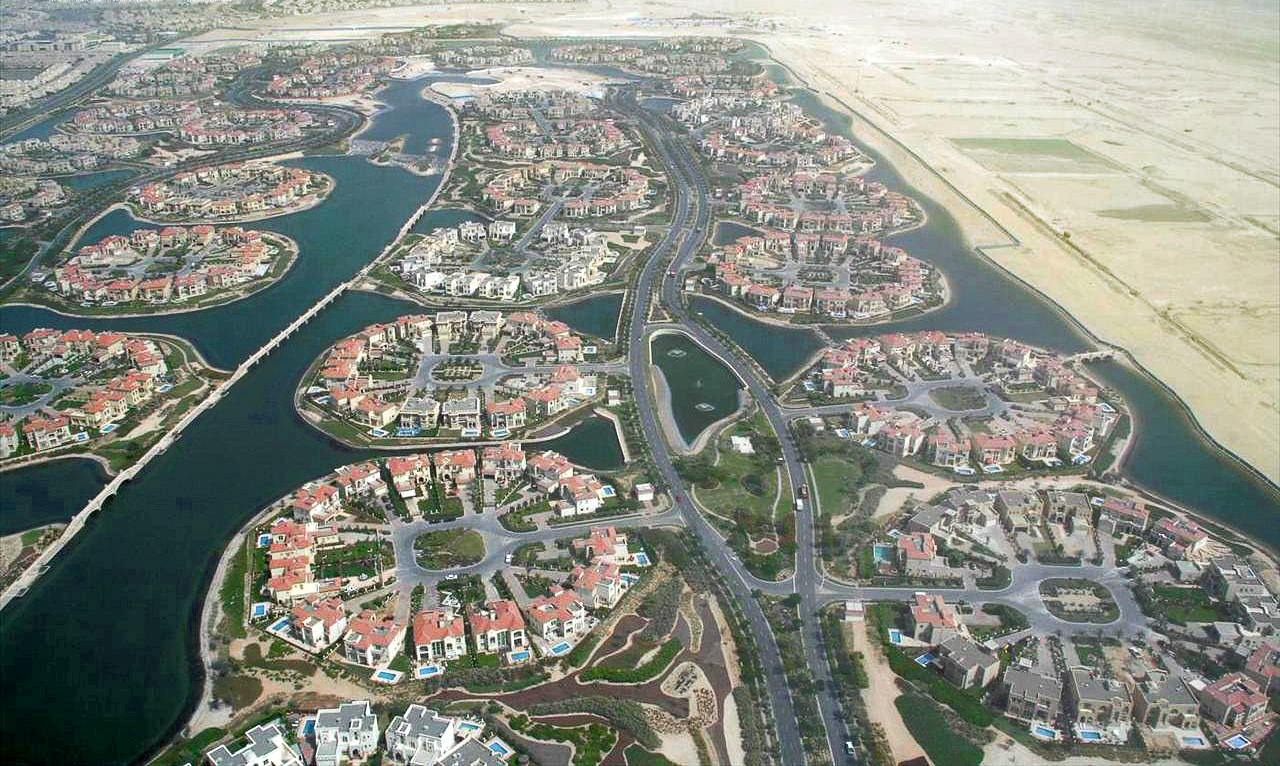
- Aerial view of Jumeirah Islands

- Location within Dubai
- Coordinates: 25.05800°N 55.15368°E
- Country: United Arab Emirates
- Emirate: Dubai
- City: Dubai
- Established: 2004

Area
  - Total: 2.74 km^{2} (1.06 sq mi)

The Jumeirah Islands (Arabic: جزر الجميرا) is a housing development in Dubai, United Arab Emirates, developed by Nakheel Properties, a Dubai-based property development company. The development is located inland from Dubai Marina and Jumeirah Lake Towers, east of the central spinal highway, Sheikh Zayed Road (E11), between interchanges 5 and 6. Jumeirah Islands consist of small islands (called clusters), each containing sixteen residential villas; with varied architectural designs ranging from Islamic to Mediterranean. The islands are situated in an artificial lake filled with seawater, with a land-to-water ratio of 23:77. The complex includes fifty islands (forty-six of which are the residential clusters), a restaurant, a supermarket, a gym, beauty salons, a pharmacy, and a leisure facility. Each of the 736 houses has its own swimming pool. The project was completed by the end of 2006. Nearby properties include the Jumeirah Lake Towers and Palm Jumeirah, both built by Nakheel Properties.

Location: Jumeirah Islands is located on Dubai's sector 3 and is home to lakes, restaurants and a club. It is near the Meadows Town Center, which is home to restaurants such as Mc Donald's and Tim Horton's. It's near Jumeirah Park, Meadows 6 and Meadows 9 on its southern end and Jumeirah Lake Towers, Dubai Marina and Palm Jumeirah on its northern end. There are multiple bus stops on Al Asayel Street and Sheikh Zayed Road near Jumeirah Islands and it is near the Sobha Reality metro station.
