= Rizwan Latif =

Karachi-born Emirati cricketer (born 1973)

Personal information
- Born: 5 October 1973; Karachi, Pakistan
- Batting: Right-handed
- Bowling: Slow left-arm orthodox
- Source: CricInfo, 7 May 2007

Rizwan Latif Ahmed (born October 5, 1973), also known as Rizwan Ahmed, is a Pakistani-born former cricketer who played for the United Arab Emirates national cricket team. He was born in Karachi and made his debut in One Day Internationals against the Indian cricket team at the Rangiri Dambulla International Stadium.
