= Al Hazzanah =

Human settlement in United Arab Emirates

Coordinates: 25.3714°N 55.4209°E

Al Hazzanah (Arabic: الحزانة) is a suburb in the city of Sharjah, United Arab Emirates. It is bordered by the Al-Qadisiya, Al-Jazzat, Al-Sabkha, and Al-Mansura Districts.
