= Asghar Ali (Emirati cricketer) =

United Arab Emirates cricketer (born 1971)

Personal information
- Born: 3 September 1971 (age 55); Kasur, Pakistan
- Batting: Right-handed

Career statistics
Competition	ODI
Matches	2
Runs scored	14
Batting average	7.00
100s/50s	0/0
Top score	14
Catches/stumpings	0/0
- Source: Cricinfo, 17 July 2004

Asghar Ali (born 3 September 1971) is a Pakistani-born former cricketer who played for the United Arab Emirates national cricket team. A right-handed batsman and occasional wicket-keeper, Ali played only two One Day Internationals for the UAE, in 1994, and has a highest score of 14.
