= Asim Saeed =

Emirati cricketer (born 1979)

Personal information
- Born: 5 October 1979 (age 47); Al-Ain
- Batting: Right-handed
- Bowling: Left-arm medium

Career statistics
Competition	ODI
Matches	2
Runs scored	12
Batting average	6.00
100s/50s	0/0
Top score	12
Balls bowled	54
Wickets	1
Bowling average	40.00
5 wickets in innings	0
10 wickets in match	0
Best bowling	1/25
Catches/stumpings	0/0
- Source: CricInfo, 17 July 2004

Asim Saeed (born 5 October 1979) is a cricketer who played for the United Arab Emirates national cricket team. He represented the UAE team in the 1997, 2001 and 2005 versions of the ICC Trophy, as well as in one first-class game in the 2004 ICC Intercontinental Cup. He also played in two One Day Internationals in the 2004 Asia Cup.
