= Syed Maqsood =

Emirati cricketer (born 1975)

Personal information
- Born: Hyderabad, Telangana, India
- Batting: Right-handed
- Bowling: Right-arm medium
- Source: CricInfo, 7 May 2007

Syed Maqsood (born 11 March 1975) is an Indian-born cricketer who played for the United Arab Emirates national cricket team. He made his debut in One Day Internationals (ODIs) against the Indian cricket team at the Rangiri Dambulla International Stadium. He played two ODIs for the UAE, both in July 2004.
