= List of Malaysian sportspeople of Indian descent =

This is a list of notable Malaysian sportspeople of Indian origin, including original immigrants who obtained Malaysian citizenship and their Malaysian descendants. Entries on this list are demonstrably notable by having a linked current article or reliable sources as footnotes against the name to verify they are notable and define themselves either full or partial Indian origin, whose ethnic origin lie in India.

This list also includes emigrant Malaysian sportspeople of Indian origin and could be taken as a list of famous Malaysian sportspeople of Indian origin.

== Athletics ==
- Canagasabai Kunalan, Singaporean sprinter, relay runner, former footballer and educator.
- Govindasamy Saravanan, Malaysian race walker. He won the gold medal at the 1998 Commonwealth Games
- Mani Jegathesan, Malaysian athletes
- Nashatar Singh Sidhu, Malaysian former javelin thrower who competed in the 1964 Summer Olympics and in the 1968 Summer Olympics.
- Shanti Govindasamy

== Aquatics ==
- Abdul Malik Mydin, Malaysian solo long-distance swimmer

== Badminton ==
- Punch Gunalan
- Renuga Veeran, Australian badminton player
- Sutheaswari Mudukasan
- Sannatasah Saniru, female Malaysian badminton player who competed at 2012 Japan Super Series
- Anita Raj Kaur
- Thinaah Muralitharan, gold medallist during the 2022 Commonwealth Games

== Cricket ==
- Arul Vivasvan Suppiah
- David Thalalla
- Harinder Singh Sekhon
- Jeevandran Nair
- John Prakash
- Krishnamurthi Muniandy
- Kunjiraman Ramadas
- Lall Singh
- Manrick Singh
- Marimuthu Muniandy
- Neville Liyanage
- Pavandeep Singh
- Rakesh Madhavan
- Ramesh Menon
- Ramesh Menon
- Rattan Jaidka (1927)
- Rohan Mark Selvaratnam
- Rohan Vishnu Suppiah
- Santhara Vello
- Sarath Jayawardene (1993–2007)
- Shankar Retinam
- Suresh Navaratnam
- Suresh Sakadivan
- Suresh Singh
- Suriaprakash Ganesan (2004–present)
- Suhan Alagaratnam
- Sydney Maartensz

== Fencing ==
- Ronnie Theseira

== Association football or soccer ==
- Devasagayam Christie Jayaseelan
- Reuben Thayaparan Kathiripillai ^{1}
- Depan Sakwati
- K. Nanthakumar^{1}
- Razali Umar Kandasamy
- Gary Steven Robbat^{1}
- Kunanlan Subramaniam^{1}
- Suppiah Chanturu^{1}
- K. Sasi Kumar
- Rajesh Perumal
- V. Kavi Chelvan
- G. Puaneswaran
- S. Sivanesan
- Gopinathan Ramachandra
- D. Saarvindran
- Surendran Ravindran
- K. Ravindran
- Thirumurugan Veeran^{1}
- Gunasekaran Jeevananthan^{1}
- Padathan Gunalan^{1}
- M. Sivakumar
- R. Surendran^{1}
- G. Mahathevan^{1}
- Gurusamy ^{1}
- S. Subramaniam^{1}
- Veenod Subramaniam

1.Representing or had represented the Malaysia national football team

- R. Arumugam, Malaysia football legend
- Santokh Singh, Malaysia football legend
- R. Surendran, striker for Selangor FA
- Thanabalan Nadarajah, played in Malaysia national football team during the 2017 Southeast Asian Games
- K. Gurusamy
- S. Kunanlan
- Thirumurugan Veeran
- Victor Andrag
- D. Saarvindran
- S. Veenod, plays as a midfielder for Selangor FA
- Gary Steven Robbat
- K. Ravindran
- K. Rajan
- R. Surendran
- K. Ravindran
- Suppiah Chanturu
- V. Murugan, former Malaysia national football team goalkeeper
- K. Nanthakumar
- S. Subramaniam
- D. Christie Jayaseelan
- K. Sasi Kumar
- Ramesh Lai Ban Huat
- Padathan Gunalan
- S. Sarath Babu
- G. Jeevananthan
- C. Premnath
- K. Reuben
- G. Mahathevan
- D. Surendran
- Surendran Ravindran
- V. Saravanan
- Thamil Arasu Ambumamee
- Gary Steven Robbat
- D. Saarvindran
- K. Depan Sakwati
- V. Kavi Chelvan
- Devasagayam Christie Jayaseelan
- P. Rajesh
- M. Sivakumar
- K. Linggam
- S. Sivanesan
- Yosri Derma Raju
- Gunasekaran Jeevananthan
- Syamer Kutty Abba
- G. Mahathevan
- G. Puaneswaran
- Gopinathan Ramachandra
- C.Nadarajan
- V.Krishnasamy

== Hockey ==
- Kuhan Shanmuganathan, Malaysia Number one hockey player. Kuhan is known as one of the penalty corner specialist.
- Kumar Subramaniam, national hockey player
- Peter van Huizen, national hockey player
- Selvaraju Sandrakasi
- Sarjit Singh, national hockey player
- Baljit Singh Charun, national hockey player
- Baljit Singh Sarjab, national player
- Duraisingam Sinnadurai, national hockey player
- John Shaw, former field hockey player, who represented Great Britain in the 1992 Summer Olympics in Barcelona and the 1996 Summer Olympics in Atlanta

== Martial art ==
- Puvaneswaran Ramasamy, National elite Karate, Rangga Roa tae kwon do l

== Motorsport ==
- Karamjit Singh, first Asian driver to win the Fédération Internationale de l'Automobile (FIA) Production Car World Championship for Drivers
- Nadarajan Periasamy
- Nandakumar Puspanathan

== Rugby ==
- Dinesvaran Krishnan, greatest Malaysian Rugby player, having played in one of the top rugby leagues in Japan.

== Scrabble ==
- Ganesh Asirvatham, world runner-up Scrabble player in 2007, and Guinness World Records holder since 2007.

== Sports management ==
- Shebby Singh, Sport Pundit
- Peter Velappan, general secretary of the Asian Football Confederation from 1978 to 2007
- K. Rajagopal, Malaysia national football team manager
- B. Sathianathan, former coach of Malaysia national football team
- K. Devan, former manager of Malaysia national football team
- M. Karathu, former Malaysian football manager and player.
- E. Elavarasan, current coach of the Malaysia Super League football team Terengganu FA
- S. Veloo, ex-coach of Penang FA
- Stanley Bernard Stephen Samuel
- Sarjit Singh, national field hockey coach

== Squash ==
- Nicol David, world number one female squash player
- Vanessa Raj
- Sanjay Singh
- Sivasangari Subramaniam

== Tennis ==
- Theiviya Selvarajoo, Malaysia Fed Cup team player
- Kanagaraj Balakrishnan

== Track cycling ==
- Arulraj Rosli
- Murugayan Kumaresan
