= Jana Nayagan (soundtrack) =

2026 soundtrack album by Anirudh Ravichander

- Soundtrack album cover

Soundtrack album by Anirudh Ravichander
- Released: 22 July 2026
- Recorded: September 2024–2025
- Studios: Albuquerque records, Chennai; Studio DMI, Las Vegas; Studio 504, Mumbai; Resound India, Chennai
- Genre: Feature film soundtrack
- Length: 25:14
- Language: Tamil
- Label: T-Series
- Producer: Anirudh Ravichander

Anirudh Ravichander chronology
Love Insurance Kompany (2026)	Jana Nayagan (2026)	DC (2026)

Singles from Jana Nayagan
- 1. "Thalapathy Kacheri" Released: 8 November 2025; 2. "Oru Pere Varalaaru" Released: 18 December 2025; 3. "Chella Magale" Released: 26 December 2025; 4. "Raavana Mavandaa" Released: 2 January 2026; 5. "Adiye En Poonthene" Released: 17 July 2026

Jana Nayagan is the soundtrack composed by Anirudh Ravichander for the 2026 Tamil-language film of the same name directed by H. Vinoth; starring Vijay and Pooja Hegde, the film is produced by KVN Productions. The makers roped in Anirudh for the production of songs and film score. This film eventually marked Anirudh's fifth collaboration with Vijay after Kaththi (2014) and Master (2021), Beast (2022) and Leo (2023). The audio rights were acquired by T-Series for a reported ₹35 crore, the highest for a Tamil film album.

The first single "Thalapathy Kacheri" was released on 8 November 2025, followed by the second single "Oru Pere Varalaaru" on 18 December 2025. The third single "Chella Magale" was released on 26 December 2025, and the fourth single "Raavana Mavandaa" on 2 January 2026. The film's audio launch event "Thalapathy Thiruvizha – Jana Nayagan Audio Launch was held at Malaysia on 27 December 2025. The venue hosted a record-breaking crowd, with over 100,000 attendees, entering The Malaysia Book of Records for the highest number of attendees at a event in Malaysia. The full album featured nine songs, with five of them being previously released as singles. It was released on 22 July 2026. The track received positive reviews from critics.

== Background ==
The soundtrack is composed by Anirudh Ravichander, in his fifth collaboration with Vijay after Kaththi (2014), Master (2021), Beast (2022) and Leo (2023); maiden with H. Vinoth.

Compositions for the film's music began in September 2024. Vijay sung "Thalapathy Kacheri" in the album, his subsequent fifth collaboration with Anirudh as a singer, after "Selfie Pulla" from Kaththi, "Kutti Story" from Master, "Jolly O Gymkhana" from Beast and "Naa Ready" from Leo. The song had rap written and performed by Arivu. Indian-American rapper Hanumankind confirmed in May 2025, that he has contributed a powerful song to the film. Anirudh has expressed emotional investment in the project, noting it as Vijay's final film before transitioning to full-time politics, and has promised an explosive background score with extra effort.

== Release ==
=== Singles ===
The first single, "Thalapathy Kacheri", was released on 8 November 2025. It is a high-energy dance number celebrating Vijay's legacy, featuring references to his iconic dance moves and career highlights. The lyric video quickly went viral, crossing 10 million views on YouTube within hours and receiving widespread acclaim from fans. The second single "Oru Pere Varalaaru" was released on 18 December 2025. It subsequently became the most-viewed Tamil song within 24 hours, garnering over 26 million views. The third single "Chella Magale" was released on 26 December 2025. The fourth single "Raavana Mavandaa" was released on 2 January 2026. The fifth single "Adiye En Poonthene" was released on 17 July 2026. The full album was released on 22 July 2026.

=== Audio launch ===
The film's audio launch event took place at Bukit Jalil National Stadium in Kuala Lumpur, Malaysia on 27 December 2025. The event titled "Thalapathy Thiruvizha – Jana Nayagan Audio Launch" was described as a massive celebration and a tribute concert, featured live performances by Anirudh Ravichander and several prominent singers, including Anuradha Sriram, S. P. Charan, Tippu, Shweta Mohan, Andrea Jeremiah, Krish, Saindhavi, Yogi B–Natchatra, and others.

Anirudh teased a special medley honoring his past collaborations with Vijay, making the event a significant milestone as Vijay's likely final audio launch before retiring from acting. The venue hosted a record-breaking crowd, with over 100,000 attendees, entering The Malaysia Book of Records for the highest number of attendees at an event in Malaysia.

== Track listing ==
Tamil
No.	Title	Lyrics	Singer(s)	Length
1.	"Thalapathy Kacheri"	Arivu	Vijay, Anirudh Ravichander, Arivu	3:17
2.	"Chella Magale"	Vivek	Vijay	3:52
3.	"Raavana Mavandaa"	Vivek	Anirudh Ravichander	1:47
4.	"Adiye En Poonthene"	Karthik Netha	Anirudh Ravichander, Ravi G	2:01
5.	"The True Leader"	Amogh Balaji	Amogh Balaji	1:50
6.	"Uravu"	Vivek	Madhushree	3:02
7.	"Oru Pere Varalaaru"	Vivek	Vishal Mishra, Anirudh Ravichander	3:55
8.	"Ulla Olicha Uyire"	Vivek	Anirudh Ravichander	3:48
9.	"Thalapathy Vetri Kondan"	Vivek	Anirudh Ravichander, Chorus	1:42
Total length:				25:14

Telugu
No.	Title	Lyrics	Singer(s)	Length
1.	"Thalapathy Kacheri"	Srinivasa Mouli	Nazeeruddin, Jayanth Maadhur, Arun Kaundinya	3:17
2.	"Kanna Vinave"	Krishna Kanth	Krishna Chaitanya	3:52
3.	"Raavana Suthudae"	Srinivasa Mouli	Saicharan Bhaskaruni	1:46
4.	"Alige Velli Pomake"	Krishna Kanth	Yasaswi Kondepudi	2:01
5.	"The True Leader"	Amogh Balaji	Amogh Balaji	1:50
6.	"Amma Pilupuni"	Srinivasa Mouli	Nitya Santhoshini	3:01
7.	"Oka Paerae Alaraaru"	Srinivasa Mouli	Sri Krishna, Vishal Mishra	3:55
8.	"TVK Theme"	Srinivasa Mouli	Saicharan Bhaskaruni, Chorus	1:39
Total length:				21:20

Hindi
No.	Title	Lyrics	Singer(s)	Length
1.	"Thalapathy Kacheri"	Ritesh G Rao	Nazeeruddin, Jayanth Maadhur, Arun Kaundinya	3:17
2.	"Jhilmil Gudiya"	Ritesh G Rao	Krishna Chaitanya	3:52
3.	"Khoon Ka Devata"	Ritesh G Rao	Saicharan Bhaskaruni	1:46
4.	"Sab Mera Tu"	Ritesh G Rao	Yasaswi Kondepudi	2:01
5.	"The True Leader"	Amogh Balaji	Amogh Balaji	1:50
6.	"Sooni Aankhen"	Ritesh G Rao	Nitya Santhoshini	3:01
7.	"Jiye Tere Hi Sahaare"	Ritesh G Rao	Sri Krishna, Vishal Mishra	3:55
8.	"TVK Theme"	Srinivasa Mouli	Saicharan Bhaskaruni, Chorus	1:39
Total length:				21:20
