= Thalapathy Kacheri =

- Official song cover

Single by Vijay, Anirudh Ravichander and Arivu

from the album Jana Nayagan
- Released: 8 November 2025
- Recorded: 2024–2025
- Studio: Albuquerque Records, Chennai; Studio DMI, Las Vegas
- Genre: EDM; dance; kuthu; rap; pop; Filmi
- Length: 3:17 (original version) 4:54 (extended music video)
- Label: T-Series
- Songwriter: Arivu
- Composer: Anirudh Ravichander
- Producer: Anirudh Ravichander

Music video
- "Thalapathy Kacheri" on YouTube

"Thalapathy Kacheri" (transl. Commander's Concert) (Note: Thalapathy reference to actor Vijay.) is an Indian Tamil-language song composed by Anirudh Ravichander for the soundtrack album of the 2026 film Jana Nayagan, directed by H. Vinoth and produced by KVN Productions. The song was sung by Vijay and Anirudh with rap portions by Arivu, who also penned the lyrics. Described as a high-energy celebratory number, the song serves as a musical tribute to Vijay's cinematic legacy and his strong bond with fans.

Released on 8 November 2025, it serves as the lead single of the film's soundtrack. The song's lyrical version was released on the YouTube through T-Series on the same day. Upon its release, the song received widespread positive response and began trending online. The hook-step, the vocals by Vijay, the dance performance of Pooja Hegde, fueled the success and made the song viral across the internet.

Following its release, it peaked on several charts including Billboard and UK Asian Music Chart and had a significant commercial success.

== Background ==
This film marks Anirudh's fifth collaboration with Vijay after Kaththi (2014) and Master (2021), Beast (2022) and Leo (2023). Arivu wrote the lyrics for the song in his seventh collaboration with Anirudh, second with Vijay and H. Vinoth. "Thalapathy Kacheri" is the third song featuring both Vijay and Pooja Hegde in a track composed by Anirudh, following "Arabic Kuthu" and "Jolly O Gymkhana". (Note: Both songs from 2022 film Beast.)

Vijay recorded the track at Albuquerque Records, Chennai in his subsequent fifth collaboration with Anirudh as a singer, after "Selfie Pulla" from Kaththi, "Kutti Story" from Master, "Jolly O Gymkhana" from Beast and "Naa Ready" from Leo.

== Composition and lyrics ==
"Thalapathy Kacheri" is characterised by Anirudh Ravichander's signature electronic energy fused with rhythmic folk elements, creating an electrifying and nostalgic soundscape. The song opens with the line "Enganney V Kacheri, Thalapathy Kacheri" in the vocals of Deepthi Suresh.

Lyrical video references to Vijay's past films, including Ghilli (2004), Thuppakki (2012), Mersal (2017), Master and others. The lyrics, penned by Arivu, are empowering and serve as a tribute to Vijay's larger-than-life screen persona and his strong connection with fans, incorporating affectionate terms such as "Nanba" and "Nanbi"; the song also subtly promotes themes of equality, unity, and opposition to caste discrimination, with the accompanying lyrical video featuring visuals of social reformers and thinkers including Periyar, B. R. Ambedkar, and Karl Marx. The song also includes Vijay thanking audience in Hindi, Telugu, and Malayalam languages.

== Release ==
While fans initially anticipated the release of first single during Diwali 2025, the launch was postponed out of respect for victims of a crowd incident in Karur during a Tamilaga Vettri Kazhagam (TVK) political event.

The first single was officially announced by the makers on 6 November 2025. On 7 November, the title of the song was released. The first single titled, "Thalapathy Kacheri" was officially released on 8 November 2025.

== Music video ==
The music video was released on 7 August 2026, featuring Vijay, Pooja Hegde, Mamitha Baiju and Monisha Blessy with Anirudh, film producer Venkat K. Narayana and Sekhar V. J., who also choreographed of the song. The music video of "Thalapathy Kacheri" is extended another one minutes thirty seven seconds for Vijay's last dance with remix tune from Vijay songs, including "Aal Thotta Bhoopathi Nanada" from Youth (2002), "Appadi Podu" from Ghilli, "Aadungada Yennai Suththi" from Pokkiri (2007), "Vaadi Vaadi" from Sachein (2005), (Note: Only dialogues.) "Vaathi Coming" from Master and "Naa Ready" from Leo.

== Critical reception ==
The song received positive reviews. The Hindu called it a "pumped-up celebration" that serves as a fitting tribute to the actor's superstardom. Neeshita Nyayapati from Hindustan Times noted that the song "celebrates his legacy, with lyrics and visuals reflecting his most iconic roles throughout the years." It also highlighted the emotional weight of the "one last dance" request from Anirudh at the end of the video, noting it made many fans emotional. Sneha Biswas of Livemint praised the vocal chemistry between Vijay and Anirudh, describing the track as "nostalgic and electric."

Anisha Rao from India Today noted "the high-energy number doubles as a celebration of Vijay’s larger-than-life persona and his unbreakable bond with fans". Yatamanyu Narain of News18 "‘Thalapathy Kacheri’ isn’t just another mass track — it’s a full-fledged musical tribute. With Vijay himself lending his voice alongside rapper Arivu, the track bursts with high-voltage beats and empowering lyrics that echo the connection between the star and his legion of fans. The composition combines Anirudh’s signature electronic energy with rhythmic folk elements, creating a soundscape that’s both nostalgic and electric."

Bhawana Tanmayi from Moneycontrol In "Thalapathy Kacheri," Vijay seems to say goodbye to the movies in the best way possible: with music, fans, and a party. The song captures the spirit of a superstar who ruled the screen for decades and is now getting ready to take his charm out of the movies and into the public eye. As fans keep streaming and sharing the song, one thing is clear: Vijay's goodbye to movies is as big as his legacy.

MSN noted, "The visual design of the song is designed to appeal to the audience on a large scale. Choreographed by Sekhar, 'Thalapathy Kacheri', the entire song creates a concert vibe. The song, which released today, has further boosted the promotion of the film Jana Nayagan and has become a day of celebration for Thalapathy fans."

== Impact ==
Vijay and Pooja Hegde's hookstep in the music video went viral. The song was trending at top position for several days on YouTube. Upon its release, the song started trending on internet and became a chartbuster. The song soon started trending on several music platforms. Song entered in the trending list on 22 countries. Asianet News listed the song in the Top Tamil Hit Songs list.

Upon its release, the song sparked massive celebrations across the country. Fans in various cities organized street festivals, dancing to the track while wearing posters of the film. Social media platforms like Instagram saw a surge in "dance cover challenges," particularly focusing on the hook step choreographed by Sekhar V. J.. In some theaters, fans reportedly treated the lyrical video release as a full-length film screening. Nancy Tiwari of Asianet News noted following her viral "Monica" performance, Hegde once again grabbed everyone’s attention, becoming the talk of the town.

== Live performances ==
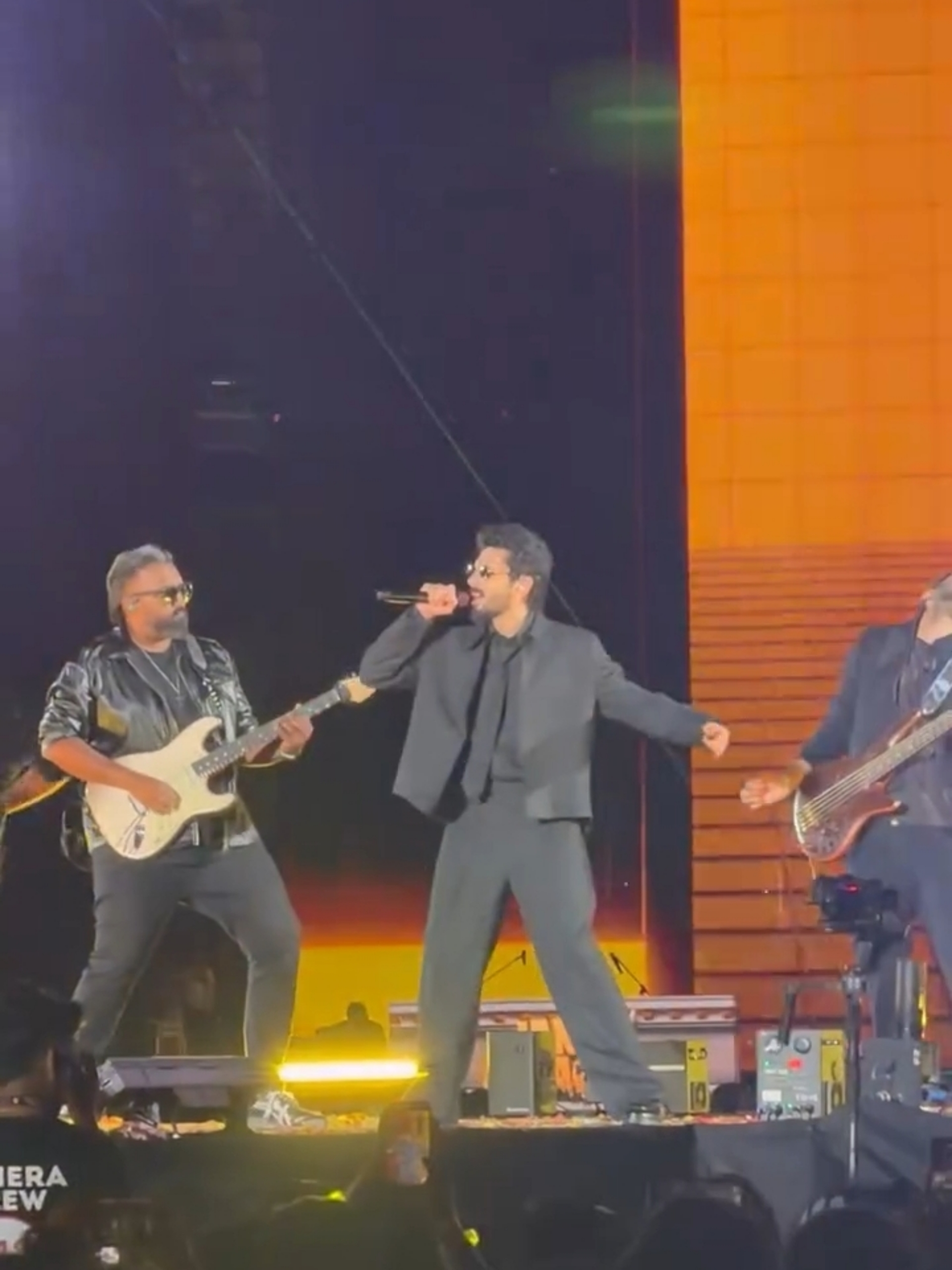
Anirudh performing the song at Thalapathy Thiruvizha – Jana Nayagan Audio Launch.

Anirudh and Vijay performed the song live at the film's promotional event, Thalapathy Thiruvizha – Jana Nayagan Audio Launch held on 27 December 2025 at the Bukit Jalil National Stadium in Kuala Lumpur, Malaysia.

== YouTube views freeze and surge ==
In November 2025, shortly after the release of the lyric video for "Thalapathy Kacheri, the YouTube view count experienced a temporary freeze followed by a sudden increase, reaching over 44 million views in a short period. YouTube's official X account clarified that this occurred due to their automated validation process, which verifies views for authenticity and can cause counts to slow down or freeze temporarily, particularly when videos are reviewed under Google Ads policies; in this instance, the video was initially flagged potentially due to associations with Vijay's political activities but was subsequently cleared as entertainment content, resulting in the accumulated genuine views being updated at once.

== Credits and personnel ==
Credits adapted from YouTube.

- Anirudh Ravichander – Composer, Vocals, Arranger, Programmer
- Arivu – Vocals & Lyrics
- Vijay – Vocals
- Sekhar V. J. – Choreography
- Deepthi Suresh – Backing Vocals
- Rakesh – Trumpets
- Karthik Vamsi – Rhythm producer
- Shashank Vijay – Additional rhythm programmer
- Nivin Raphael – Additional music programmer
- Ananthakrrishnan – Music advisor
- Sajith Satya – Creative consultant
- Shivakiran S – Session assistant, Engineer
- Shivakiran – Session assistant
- Srinivasan M – Mixing engineer
- Luca Pretolesi – Mastering engineer
- Velavan B – Music coordinator

== Charts ==
Chart performances for "Thalapathy Kacheri"
Chart (2025)	Peak position
UK Asian Music Chart (OCC)	7
India (Billboard)	8
UK Video Streaming Chart (OCC)	55
