= Nandakumar =

Nandakumar may refer to:

- Krishna, Hindu god, the son (Kumar) of Nanda

== Places ==
- Nandakumar, Purba Medinipur, a village in Tamluk subdivision of Purba Medinipur district in the state of West Bengal, India.

== People ==
- Laishram Nandakumar Singh, politician from Manipur, India
- Maharaja Nandakumar (died 1775), Mughal Indian tax official best known for his connection with Warren Hastings
- Nandakumar Puspanathan (born 1974), Malaysian rally driver
- Pratibha Nandakumar (born 1955), noted Kannada writer and theatre activist

== Other ==
- Nandakumar (film), a 1938 Indian Tamil-language film
