= Arulmigu Sri Rajakaliamman Glass Temple =

Hindu temple in Johor, Malaysia

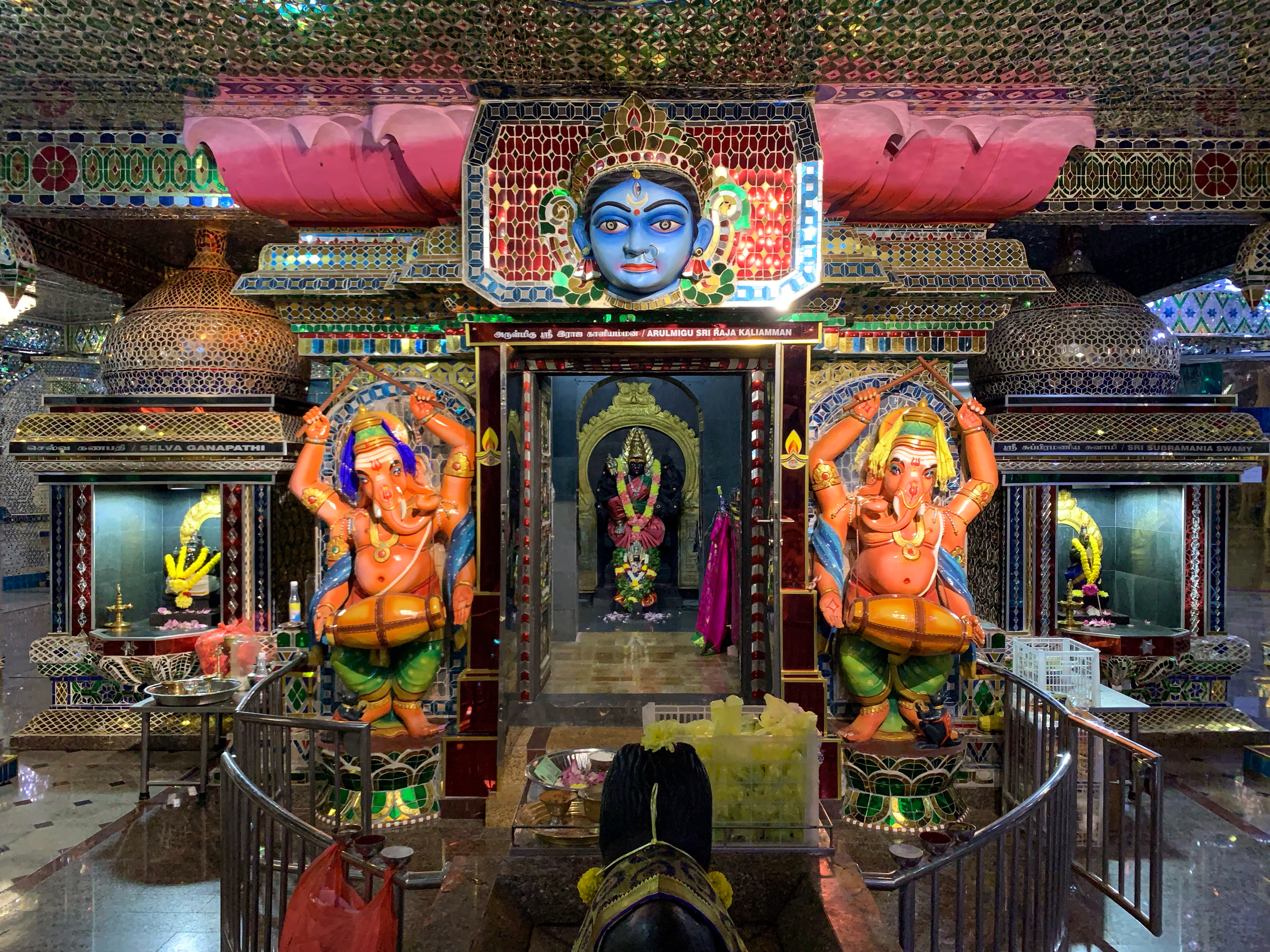
- At the sanctum sanctorum of the temple

- Location in Malaysia

Religion
- Affiliation: Hinduism
- District: Johor Bahru
- Deity: Kaliamman

Location
- Location: Johor Bahru
- State: Johor
- Country: Malaysia
- Interactive map of Arulmigu Sri Rajakaliamman Glass Temple
- Coordinates: 1°28′7″N 103°45′35″E

Architecture
- Type: Dravidian architecture
- Creator: Sri Sinnathamby Sivasamy
- Completed: 1922

Website
- www.srirajakaliamman.org

The Arulmigu Sri Rajakaliamman Glass Temple is a Hindu temple in Johor Bahru, Johor, Malaysia. It is also one of the state's tourist attractions. The temple was listed in the Malaysian Book of Records as the first and only glass temple in the nation on 12 May 2010.

== History ==
This temple, which is one of the oldest Hindu temples in Johor Bahru, is situated next to the railway tracks between Jalan Tun Abdul Razak and Jalan Mohd Taib, near the Tebrau Highway). It was established in 1922 as a simple shelter on land presented by the Sultan of Johor.

In 1991, Sri Sinnathamby Sivasamy, who is currently temple chairman and chief priest, also known as Guru Bhagawan Sittar inherited the administration of the temple from his father. He has been the driving force behind the temple's renovation and expansion, committing to rebuilding it from the humble hut that it once was. Despite facing challenges and difficulties, the temple was rebuilt and officially reopened in 1996.

=== Rebuilding in glass ===
The Guru had the inspiration to rebuild the temple in glass during one of his trips to Bangkok. He was in a tuk-tuk in Bangkok when he saw a light shining like a diamond, some 2 kilometres (1.2 mi) away. The driver told him that it was a wat (temple). When he went there, he found that it was the glass artwork at the temple entrance that had caught his eyes.

He was amazed that a small glass artwork could capture his attention from a vast distance. This inspired him to use this technique in the Arulmigu Sri Rajakaliamman Temple. He believed a temple fully embellished with impressive glass artwork will attract local devotees and visitors from the world over.

Transformation of the temple with glass fittings started in 2008 and was completed in October 2009. Since then, it has become one of the state's major tourist attractions.

== Architecture ==
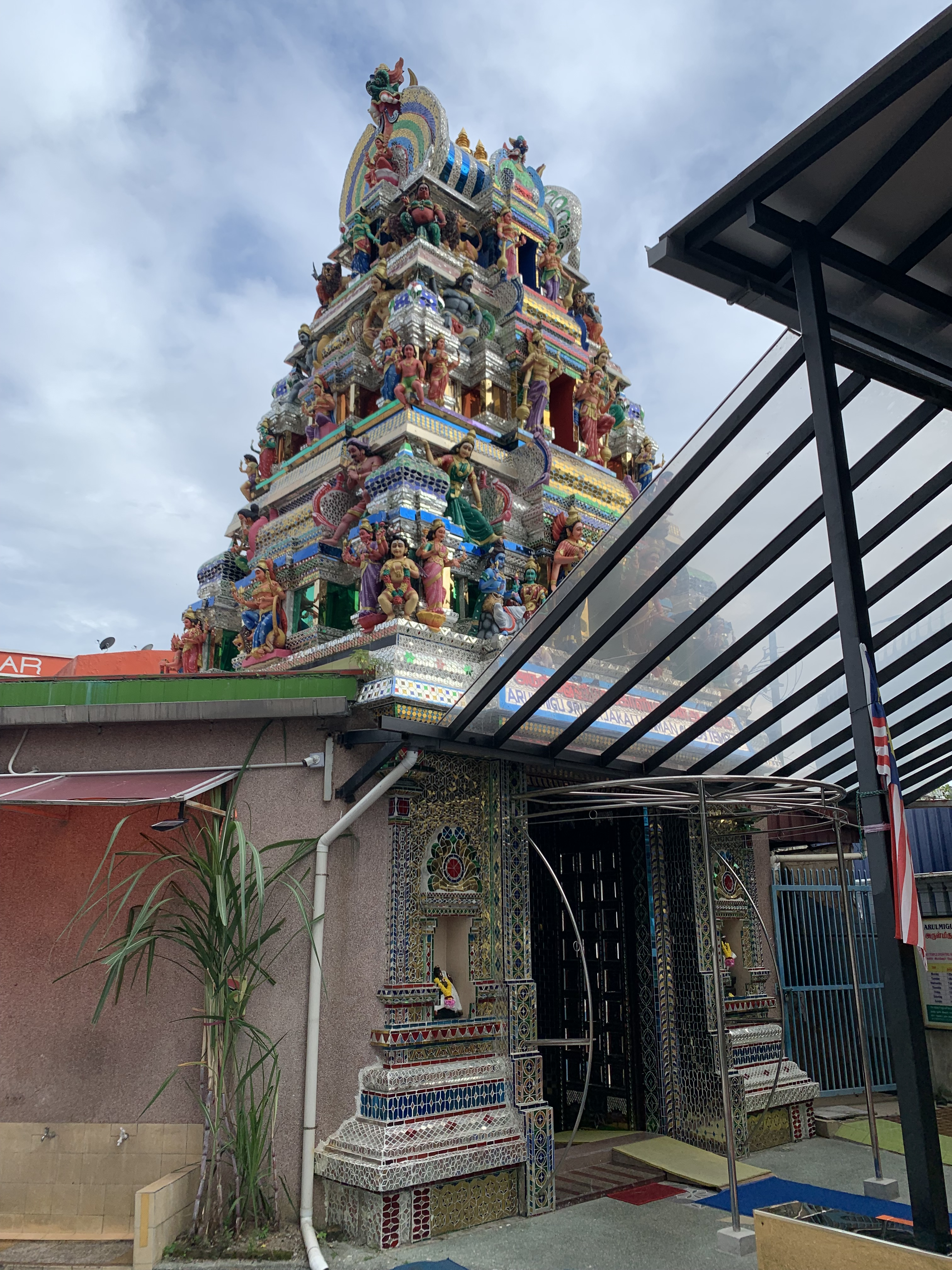
The gopuram of the temple

Light from crystal chandeliers is reflected on doors, pillars, walls and ceilings in a bright blaze that is quite blinding initially. At least 90 per cent of the temple is embellished by a mosaic of 300,000 pieces of red, blue, yellow, green, purple and white glass.

The centrepiece in the Athma Lingam sanctuary is a lotus for Shiva, on which devotees can pour rose water and perform their prayers. Guru says this special sanctuary is the first in Malaysia to be designed with walls that are fully covered with 300,000 mukni Rudraksha beads from Nepal.

At a glance, the walls appear to have an unusual embossed texture. Each Rudraksha bead is embedded in the walls with a chanted prayer.

The fully air-conditioned temple has a café that serves vegetarian meals for special events, and a function hall in an adjoining building.

== Sculptures ==
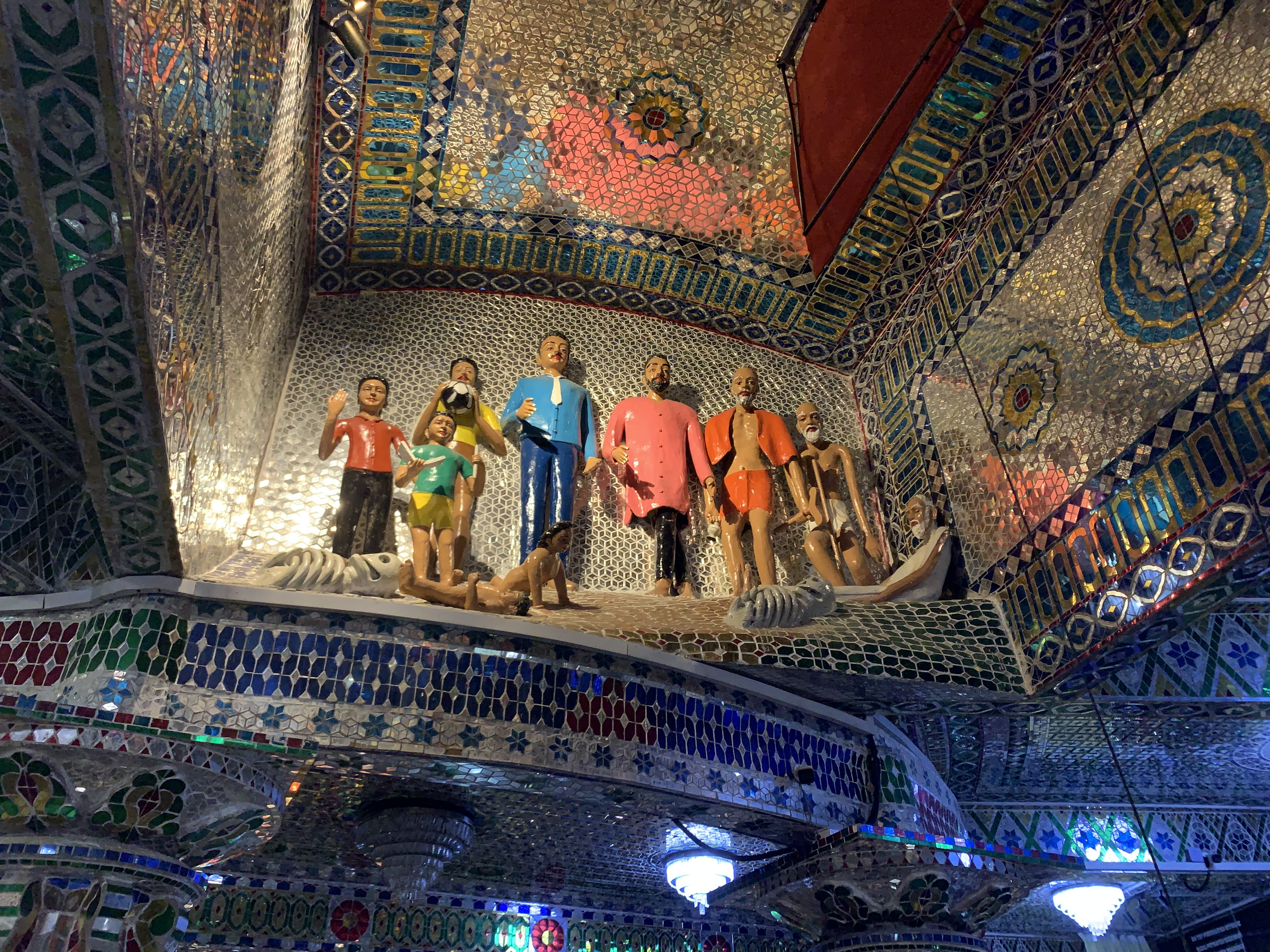
The sculptures depicting the cycle of life

There are 10 gold-finished sculptures close to the ceiling. Of the two figures on the left, one appears to be lying down and the other crawling, while the one on the far right seems to be reclining too. These sculptures portray the cycle of life, from birth, youth, adulthood, to old age and death.

There are 10 white marble statues standing 120 centimetres (47 in) tall each. According to the name plaques, these are Gautama Buddha, Guru Nanak Dev Ji, Sai Baba and Mother Teresa. The Guru believes that these are messengers of God, and visitors of other faiths will be happy to see them here.

== Murals ==
On the left wing, there are two large panels on the ceiling painted by specially commissioned artists to convey a universal message of social and racial harmony.

In one picture, a cow is next to an Indian girl, a dog is near a Chinese girl while a Malay girl holds a cat in her arms.

The other picture has a Hindu motorcyclist being helped up by a Muslim after he fell off his bike, while a Buddhist is picking up his helmet and a Christian is lifting up the motorcycle.

== Location and Opening Hours ==
The temple, located at Jalan Tun Abdul Razak 1/1, Wadi Hana, Johor Bahru, is accessible through Jalan Tun Abdul Razak and the lane that borders Gim Shew Building. Car and coach parking is available and there's also a shoe storage service.

It is open for devotees from 7am to 10pm daily, while visiting hours for tourists are between 1pm and 5pm.

== See also ==
- Kanch Mandir Kach Mandir, Indore, 1903
