= Nadarajan Periasamy =

Malaysian motorbike rider

- நடராஜன் பெரியசாமி
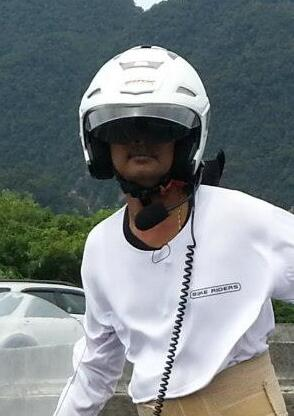
- Born: 19 November 1963 (age 62); Kuala Pilah, Negeri Sembilan, Malaysia
- Other name: Success P. Nada
- Occupation: Maintenance Manager
- Known for: Malaysian motorbike rider
- Spouse: Samundiswari
- Children: 2
- Parent(s): Periasamy/ Valli

Nadarajan Periasamy (Tamil: நடராஜன் பெரியசாமி) is a Malaysian Indian motorcycle rider known as Success P. Nada. He holds multiple motorcycle-related records in Malaysia.

== Records ==
=== 2007 ===
Periasamy achieved his first record on September 15, 2007, for "The Longest Motorcycle Standing Ride", in which he rode a 1500 cc Honda Gold Wing Touring motorcycle from Johor Bahru, Malaysia town to Bukit Kayu Hitam, Malaysia via "North-South Highway" over a distance of 933 km. The recorded time taken to complete the task was 10 hours and 45 minutes.

=== 2010 ===
Periasamy's second record, for "Longest Motorcycle Ride", was set on December 26, 2010, wherein he rode his 1500 cc Honda Gold Wing solo at the Sepang International Circuit (SIC) for 12 hours straight. The event started at 6:00 am and ended at 6:00 pm, covering a total distance of 875 km in 165 laps.

=== 2011 ===
On February 12, 2011, Periasamy again set the record for "The Longest Standing Motorcycle Ride", riding his 1500 cc Honda Gold Wing from Komtar, Penang, Malaysia to Pattaya, Thailand. The event covered a distance of 1,410 km within 18 hours. The record was authenticated by Ripley’s Believe It Or Not! and awarded a formal recognition and certification at Ripley’s Museum in Pattaya, Thailand.

=== 2011 ===
On December 3, 2011, Periasamy on the same year set the record again, riding 1800 cc Honda Gold Wingfrom Komtar, Penang, Malaysia to Hua Hin, Thailand. The event covered a distance of 980 km within 8 hours. The record was authenticated by Thailand Records and awarded formal recognition and certification present by protocol Thailand King at Thailand King Birthday Celebration of 85 years in Hua Hin.

=== 2012 ===
On October 4 and 5, 2012, Periasamy again set the record for “Longest Standing Motorcycle Ride". He rode 1800 cc Honda Gold Wing from Johor Bahru, Malaysia to Krabi, Thailand, covering a distance of 1410 km within 19 hours. The event was organized by 3 Nation Charity Ride Malaysia, Singapore and Thailand. The record was authenticated by Malaysian Book of Records.

=== 2014 ===
This record has been made by two participant Periasamy and Ganasan Thuraisamy, this record has been named "Longest Distance Motorcycle Ride By Duo" rode his 1800 cc Honda Gold Wing travelling entire highways, trunk road and city road in Malaysia total 5606 km has been covered and its took almost four days to finish the tour, once again he placed his name in Malaysian Book Of Records.

=== 2015 ===
This will be his seventh Malaysian Book Of Records, "Longest Distance Standing Motorcycle Ride" on 1800 cc Honda Gold Wing, journey begin from Gunung Jerai, Kedah, Malaysia followed by the destinations Bukit Bendera, Penang, Malaysia, Gua Musang, Pahang, Malaysia and finish line at Cameron Highland, Pahang, Malaysia. This record has been achieved on 8 August 2015. Total 1150 km has been covered. The record was authenticated by Malaysian Book Of Records and for this achievement was given a formal recognition and certification record by Malaysian Book Of Records. This full event supported by Yayasan Pemotoran Nasional(YPN), Penang,State Government, Jabatan Kerja Raya(JKR), Penang, Malaysia and Polis Diraja Malaysia, Pahang & Polis Diraja Malaysia, Kelantan.
