= Thalapathy Thiruvizha =

2025 concert by Anirudh Ravichander

Thalapathy Thiruvizha – Jana Nayagan Audio Launch
- Jana Nayagan audio launch concert by Anirudh Ravichander
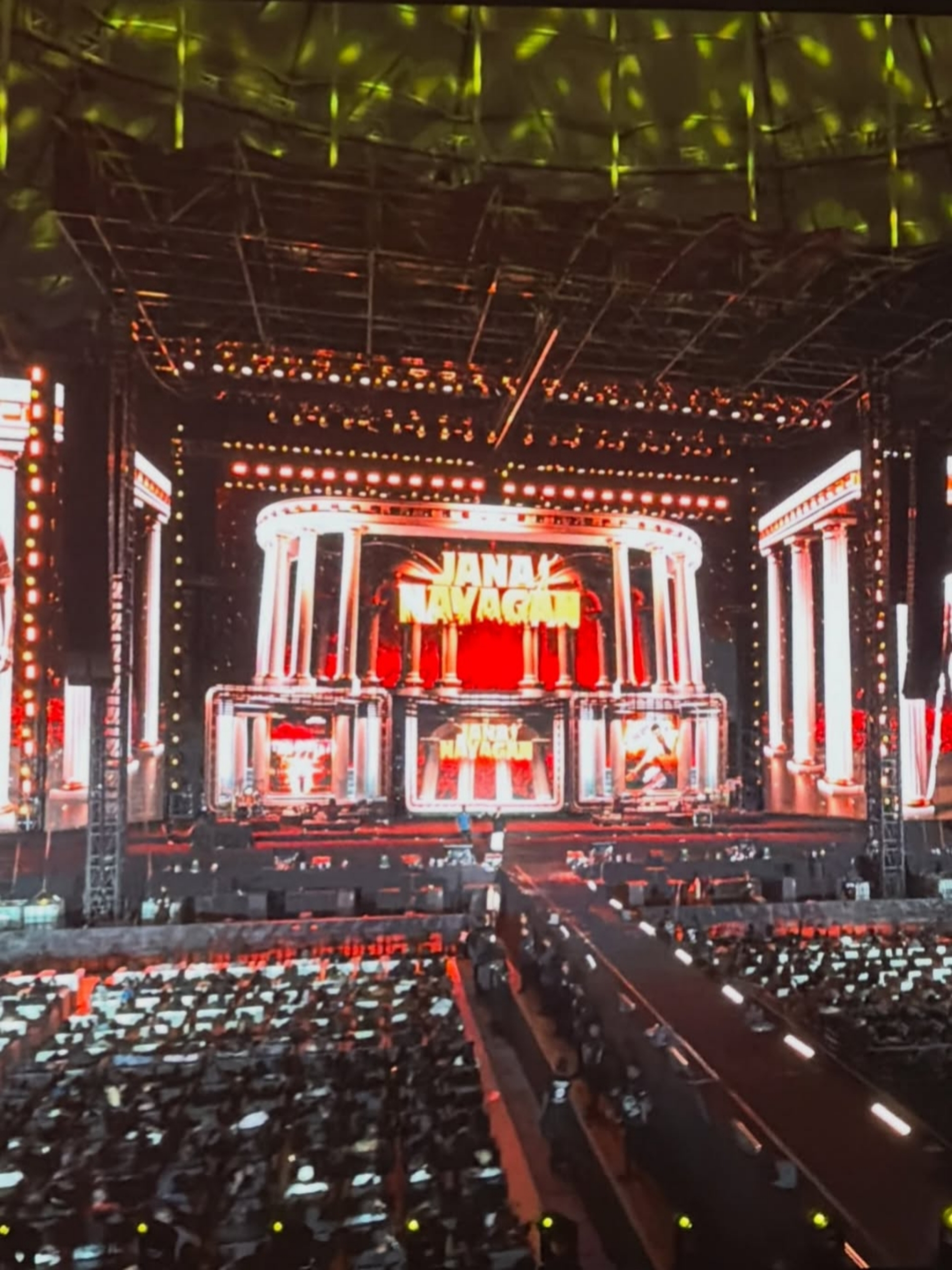
- Location: Kuala Lumpur, Malaysia
- Venue: Bukit Jalil National Stadium
- Associated album: Jana Nayagan
- Date: 27 December 2025
- Duration: 6 hours
- No. of shows: 1
- Supporting acts: Anuradha Sriram; S. P. Charan; Tippu; Andrea Jeremiah; Shweta Mohan; Vijay Yesudas; Saindhavi; Haricharan; Harish Raghavendra; Yogi B, Emcee Jasz and Dr. Burn
- Producers: KVN Productions; Malik Streams
- Attendance: 100,000
- Box office: ₹500 million (US$5.2 million)
- TV: Zee Tamil

Thalapathy Thiruvizha – Jana Nayagan Audio Launch (lit. '"Thalapathy Festival"') was an audio launch event and concert by Indian composer and playback singer Anirudh Ravichander. It was staged to release and promote the soundtrack album, Jana Nayagan (2026), composed by Anirudh for the 2026 action thriller film of the same name, directed by H. Vinoth starring Vijay and Pooja Hegde. It was held on 27 December 2025 at the Bukit Jalil National Stadium in Kuala Lumpur, Malaysia.

Billed as a historic farewell to actor Vijay's acting career ahead of his full-time entry into politics, the 6-hour event featured live performances of over 40 songs from Vijay's filmography, performed by Anuradha Sriram, S. P. Charan, Tippu, Andrea Jeremiah, Shweta Mohan, Vijay Yesudas, Krish, Saindhavi, Haricharan, Harish Raghavendra Yogi B, Emcee Jasz and Dr. Burn.

The event recorded unprecedented public demand, ticket sales and attendances, dominating social media and news cycles. The event was attended by a record-breaking crowd of over 100,000 people, including Vijay, H. Vinoth, Pooja Hegde, Atlee, Lokesh Kanagaraj, Nelson Dilipkumar, and the film's cast and crew, along with other renowned personalities and celebrities. It established a new record in the Malaysian Book of Records for the largest audience for a single event in Malaysia.

== Background ==
In early–August 2025, it was reported that Jana Nayagan will have an audio launch event. In an interview in late–August 2025, actress Pooja Hegde confirmed about the upcoming audio launch for the film. Initially considered for Dubai, the venue was shifted to Malaysia after persuasion by Malik Streams Corporation CEO Datuk Abdul Malik Dasthigeer, which holds distribution rights in Malaysia. The audio launch for Vijay–starrer Leo was initially planned at Axiata Arena indoor stadium in Malaysia in 2023. But those plans were cancelled due to logistical issues, including venue unavailability and lack of permissions. Similarly, The Greatest of All Time, starring Vijay also had early reports in May 2024 suggesting a potential audio launch in Malaysia or Singapore, but the event also didn't happened. In June 2025, the makers of Jana Nayagan began planning about audio launch event in Malaysia. This is the first audio launch for a Vijay-starrer film in three years—since Varisu (2023)—and marks the actor's first ever audio launch event outside India.

== Announcement ==
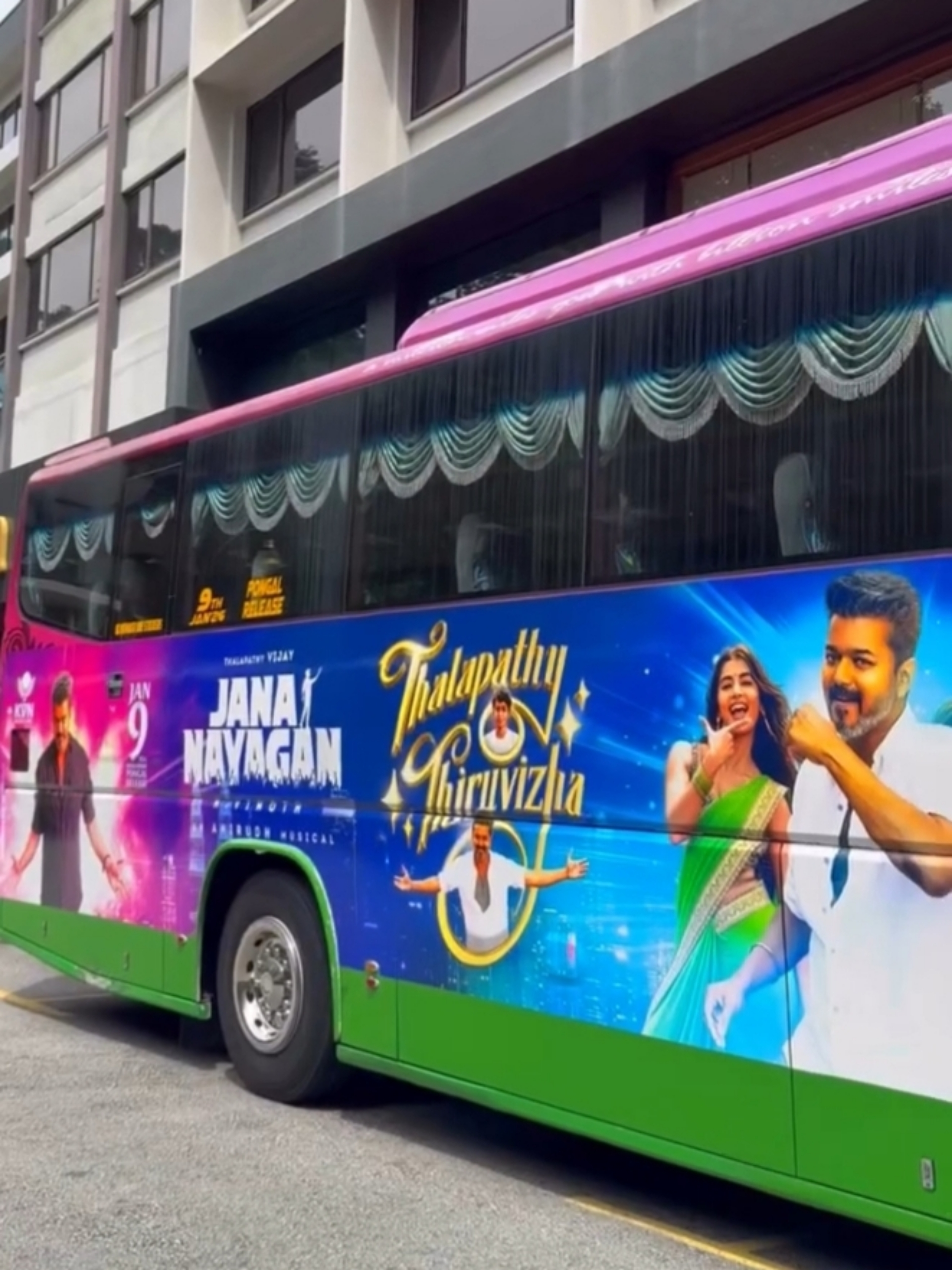
Public transport vehicles in Malaysia were wrapped with Thalapathy Thiruvizha posters as part of the marketing.

On 21 November 2025, KVN Productions released a promo on social media platforms, showing the Malaysia cities and captioned it "Selamat datang", revealing an announcement is coming at 5:30 PM. KVN Productions announced that the audio launch event of the film Jana Nayagan will happen on 27 December 2025 at the Bukit Jalil National Stadium in Kuala Lumpur, Malaysia. The makers unveiled a beautifully crafted five minutes video montage that instantly struck an emotional chord with fans. The montage journeys through some of Vijay's most iconic on-screen moments — from Kushi, Ghilli, Sachein, Pokkiri, Vettaikaran, Thuppakki, Theri, Mersal, Bigil, Master, Leo and others. The video also included mashup of Vijay's speeches from previous audio launches of actor's films and anticipation of the fans in Malaysia. The video had emotional song sung and composed by Anirudh with the lyrics written by Vivek.

== Ticket sales ==
Ticket sales for the Thalapathy Thiruvizha were handled by Ticket2U. Due to massive public demand, tickets went on sale on 28 November 2025. Over 60,000 tickets were sold within a few hours. Levels 2 and 3 were sold out quickly. VIP tickets were sold for over ₹100,000 (US$1,000).

Seating categories
Category	Price (MYR)
MIP LUXE	RM5115 (₹118,490)
MIP (L, R)	RM2565 (₹59,419)
VIP (A,B,C,D)	RM678 (₹15,706)
Level 1 (Block 101–134)	RM319.98 (₹7,412)
Level 2 (Block 201–234)	RM217.98 (₹5,050)
Level 3 (Block 301–334)	RM116 (₹2,687)

GT Holidays was the official travel partner of the event. For those outside India or in other countries, GT Holidays has introduced an exclusive package for the "Thalapathy Thiruvizha" priced at ₹19,999 (US$210) per person. This package includes the audio launch entry ticket, two-way transfer to Bukit Jalil Stadium, three nights' accommodation in a 3-star hotel, breakfast for three days, Malaysian visa, a six-hour Kuala Lumpur city tour, a visit to Batu Caves, a trip to Genting Highlands, and two-way cable car passes.

== Production ==
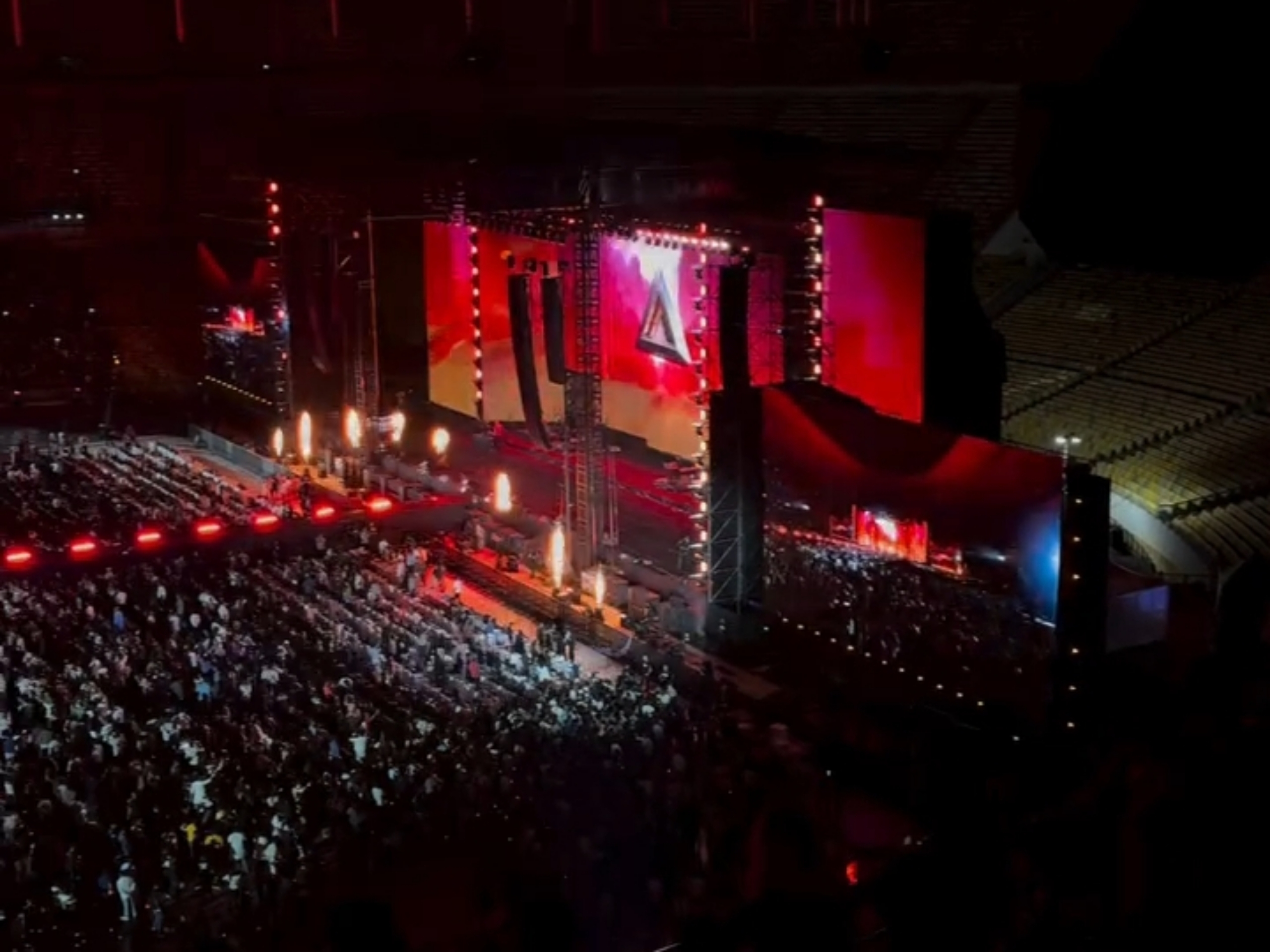
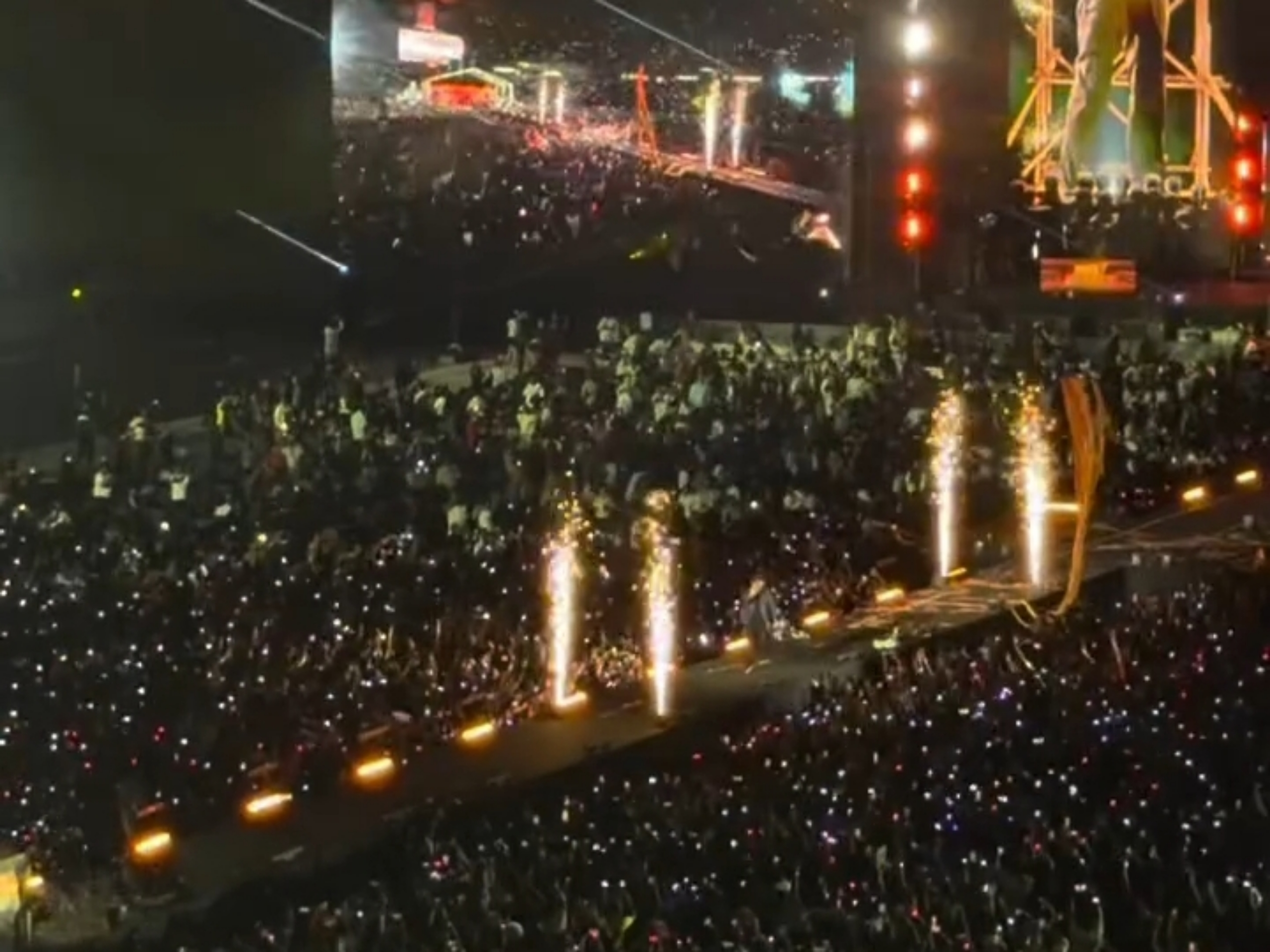
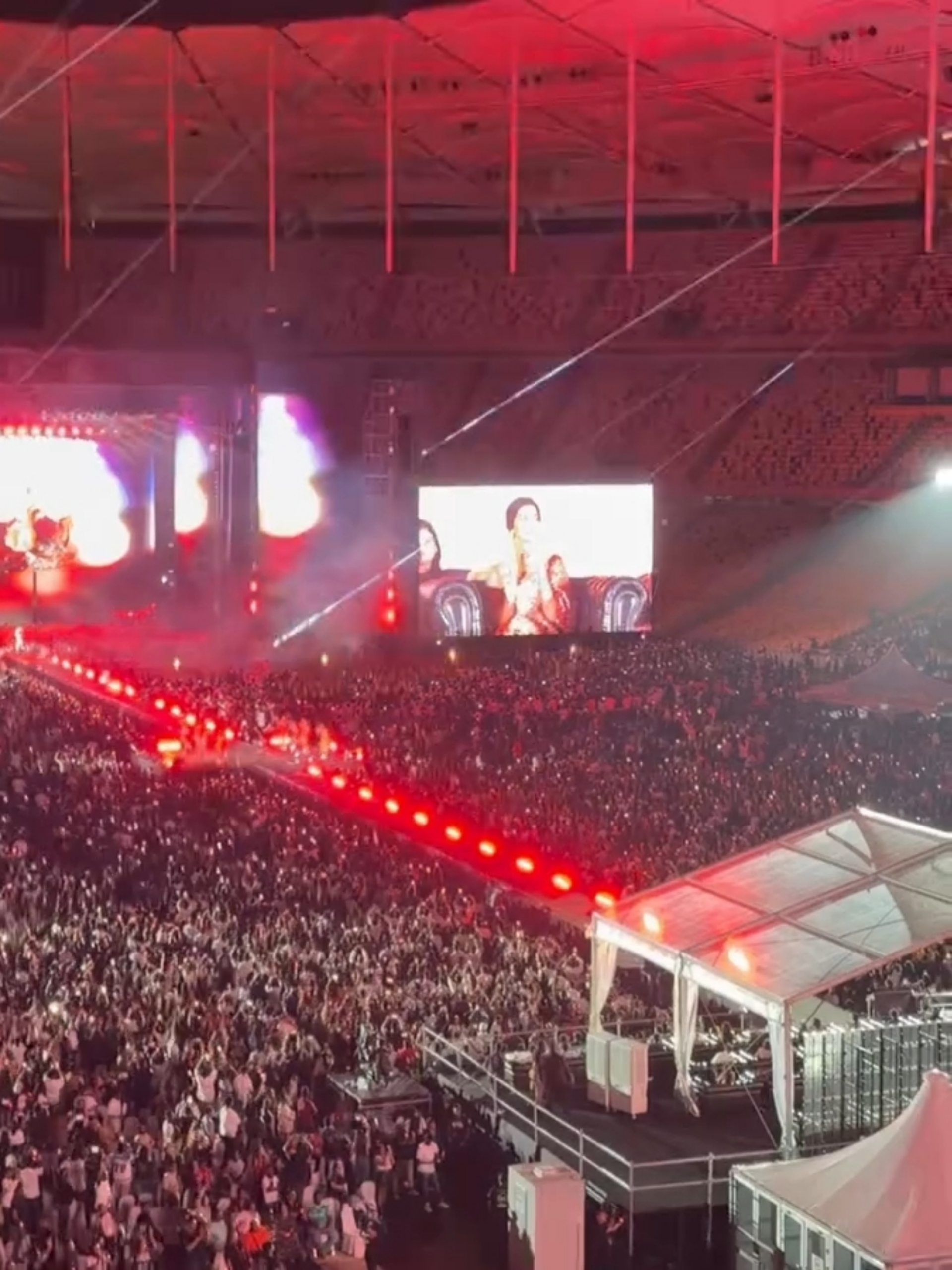
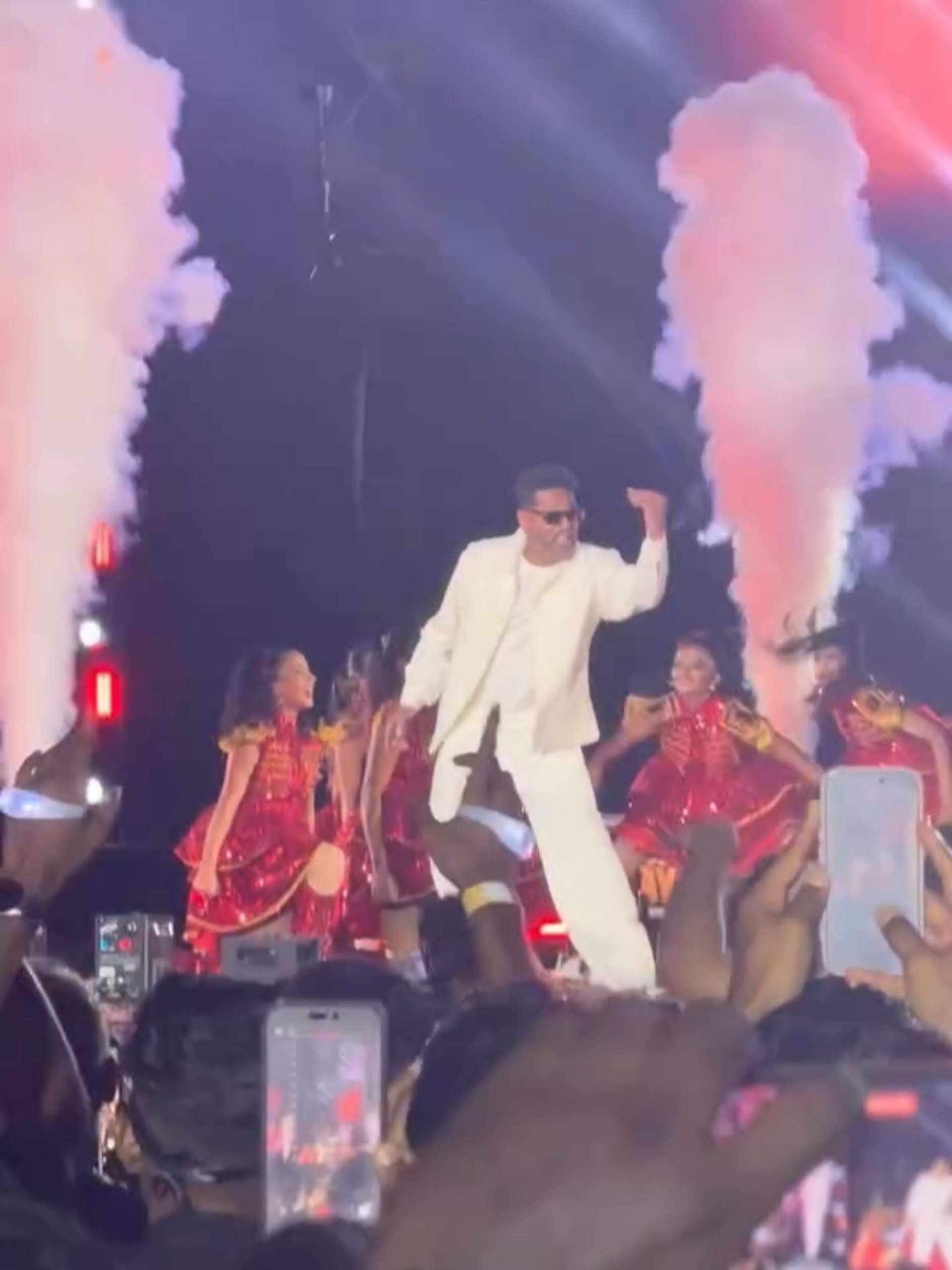
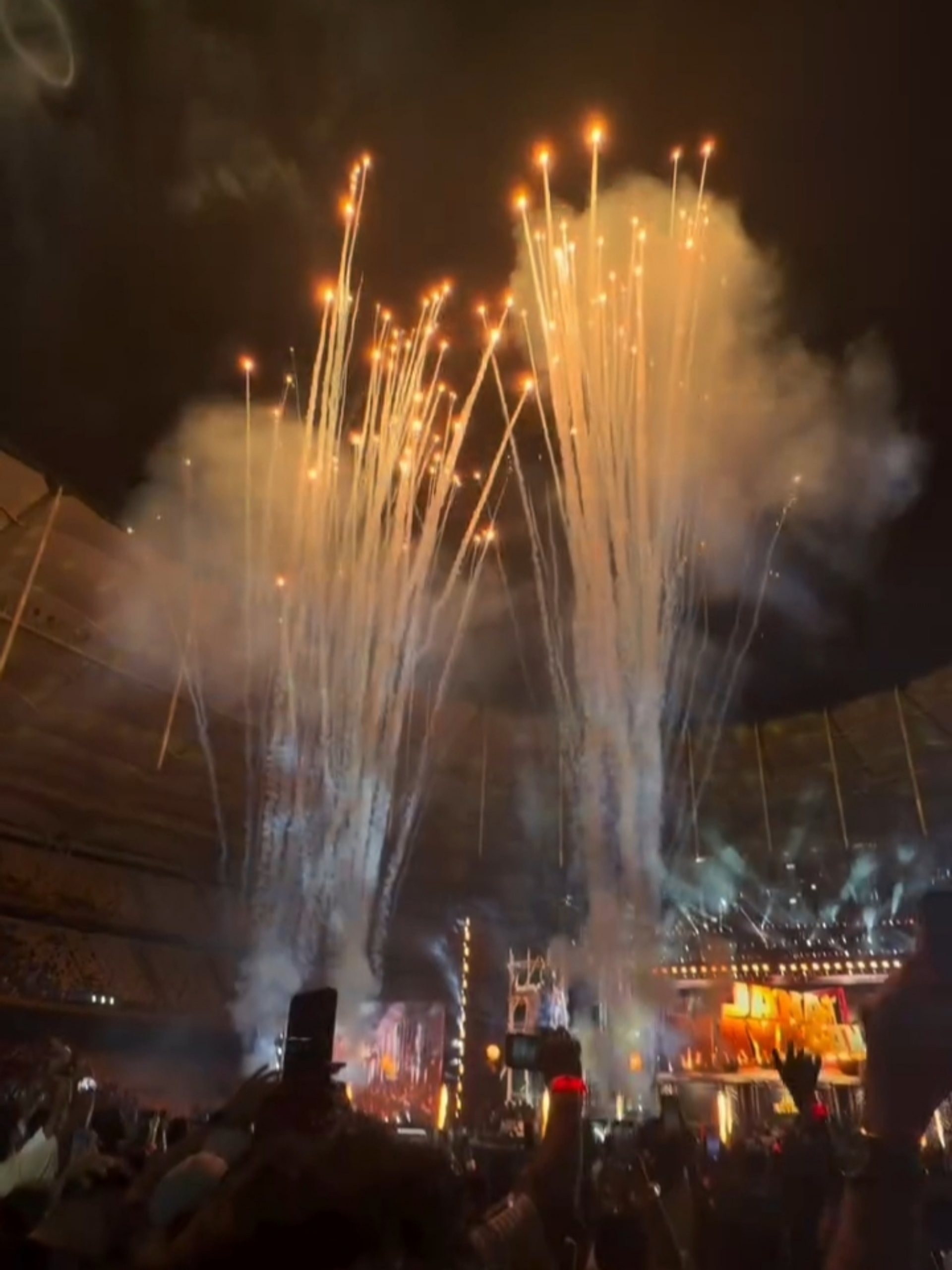
The production consists of light beams, confetti shooters, coordinated serial lights, smoke machines, pyrotechnics and fireworks. Prabhu Deva performing in stage (bottom centre).

"Thalapathy Thiruvizha" was produced by KVN Productions and Malik Streams. The concert staging was expansive, made of digital displays. It consists of three separate stages connected by a broad ramp: a main stage with a giant LED widescreen; a rectangular middle stage;and a square stage that along with the ramp forms a T-shape at the middle of the floor. The stages feature various visuals and effects throughout the show. Production elements involved pyrotechnics, laser lights, smoke machines, fire cannons, indoor fireworks, PixMob LED bracelets, and image projection technology, such as projection mapping.

The costume for Vijay was dark blue blazer. While the costume for Pooja Hegde was a pre-draped Benarasi brocade saree gown paired with an intricately embroidered corset featuring gota patti, sequins, and dori work, designed by Anita Dongre and styled by Tanya Ghavri. Before the event, Anirudh said "I'm confident that the audio launch will be extravagant. It's an open stadium and I will be performing a tribute for him with the songs I've made for his films as a medley. Since it's his last audio launch, we'll try to make it a fulfilling experience fitting for his send off." He also revealed that the tribute will have songs from Kaththi, Master, Leo, and Beast.

== Concert synopsis ==
=== Thalapathy Thiruvizha ===
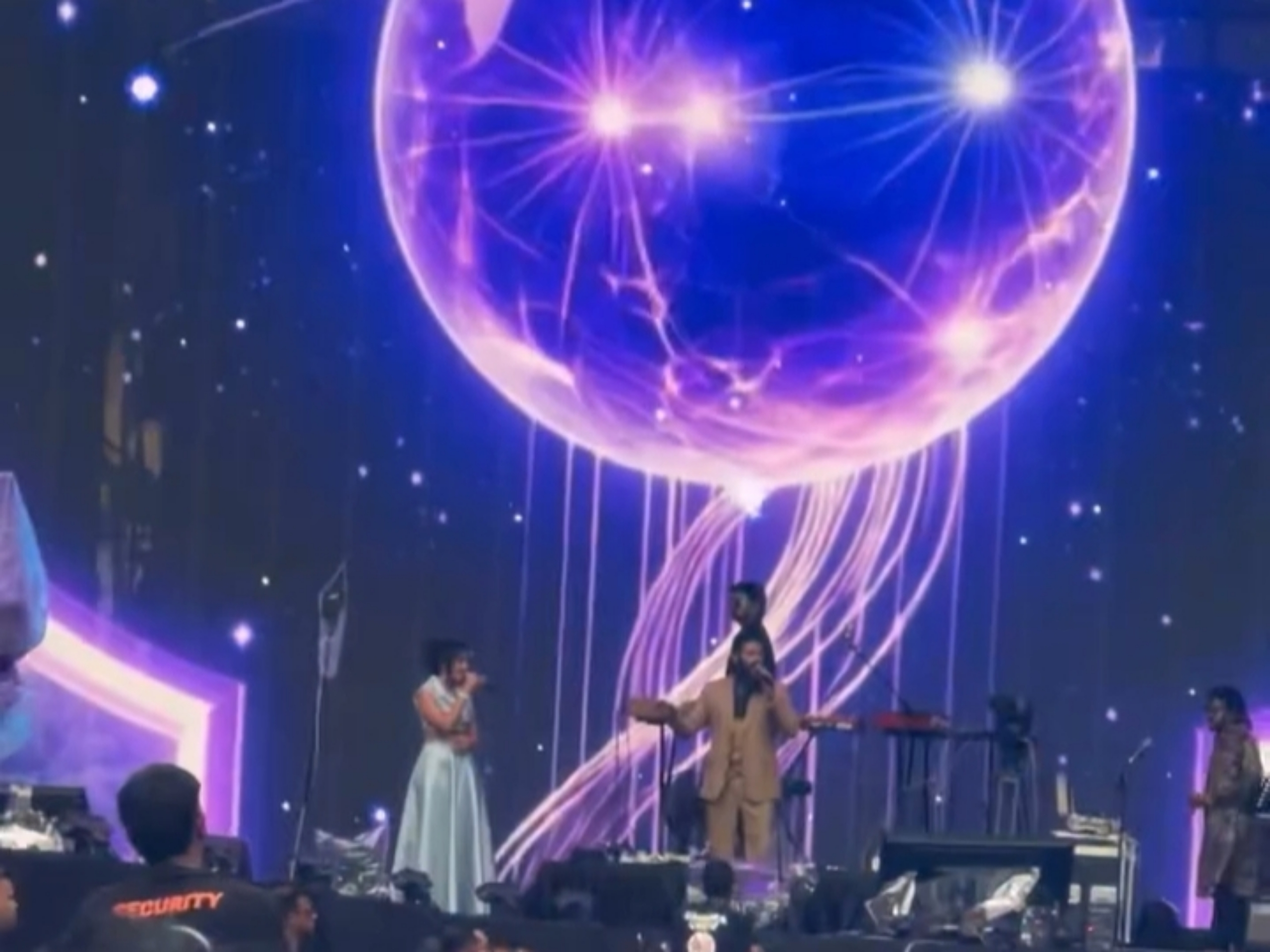
Shweta Mohan and Vijay Yesudas performing at Thalapathy Thiruvizha.

Two hosts, Rio Raj and Anjana Rangan welcomed attendees. The concert begins with a sequence of tracks performed by various singers. S. P. Charan performs "Meghamai Vanthu Pogiren", followed by Ajay Krishna with "Innisai Paadivarum". Vijay Yesudas and Anuradha Sriram perform "Oru Pattam Poochi", while Harish Raghavendra sings "Melliname". Krish and Sanjana Kalmanje perform "Molachu Moonu", and Haricharan with Pallavi sings "Mottu Onru". S. P. Charan returns for "Yenna Azhago" and "Oru Kaditham", with Harish Raghavendra performing "Sakkarai Nilave". Haricharan continues with "Ennai Thalatta Varuvala" and joins Anuradha Sriram for "Oru Ponnu Onnu". Krish and Andrea Jeremiah perform "Chinna Thamarai", Tippu and Saindhavi sing "Valayapatti Thavile", and Shweta Mohan with Ajay Krishna perform "Maacho".

The program includes an unplugged segment. Shweta Mohan and Haricharan perform "Un Perai Sollum", S. P. Charan and Shweta Mohan perform "Azhagooril", Anuradha Sriram and Vijay Yesudas perform "Oru Naal Oru Kanavu", Harish Raghavendra performs "Yen Pennendru", Saindhavi performs "En Jeevana", and Vijay Yesudas sings "Nee Yaaro".

Ajay Krishna and Shweta Mohan perform "Kokkara Kokkarako", followed by "Aal Thotta Boopathi" and "Arjunar Villu" by Tippu and Ajay Krishna. Tippu and Saindhavi perform "Yeau Durra". A group performance features Haricharan, Shweta Mohan, Sanjana Kalmanje, Ajay Krishna, Harish Raghavendra, Anuradha Sriram, and Vijay Yesudas on tracks including "Thalaivaa Thalaivaa" and "Ella Pugazhum". Additional songs in this concert includes "Aalaporaan Thamizhan", "Naan Adicha", "Puli Urumudhu". "Thalapathy Thiruvizha" concludes with "Appadi Podu" performance by Tippu and Anuradha Sriram.

=== Jana Nayagan Audio Launch ===
RJ Vijay and Ramya Subramanian hosts the Jana Nayagan Audio Launch event. The event begins with the entry of the cast and crew of the film Jana Nayagan. The poster designer of the film, Gopi Prasanna addresses the gathering first. Lyricist Vivek then announces a new track titled "Ravana Mavan Da". This is followed by a performance of the song "Kodambakkam Area", sung by veteran singer Shoba Chandrasekhar along with playback singer Tippu. Mamitha Baiju then performs a dance number. Actors of the film Priyamani, Nassar, Sunil and Mamitha address the gathering. Producer Venkat K. Narayana speaks about the film and shares his insights.

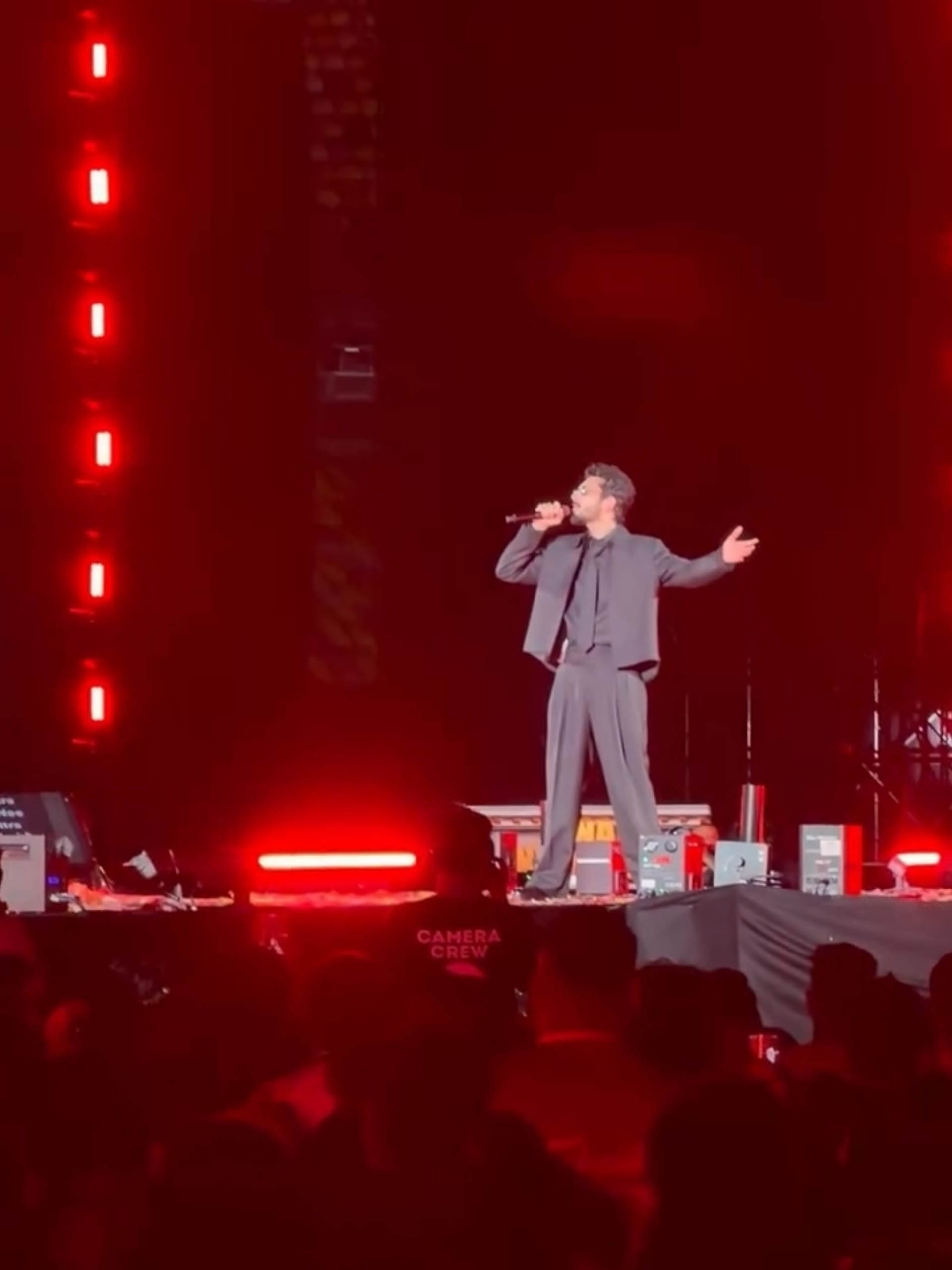
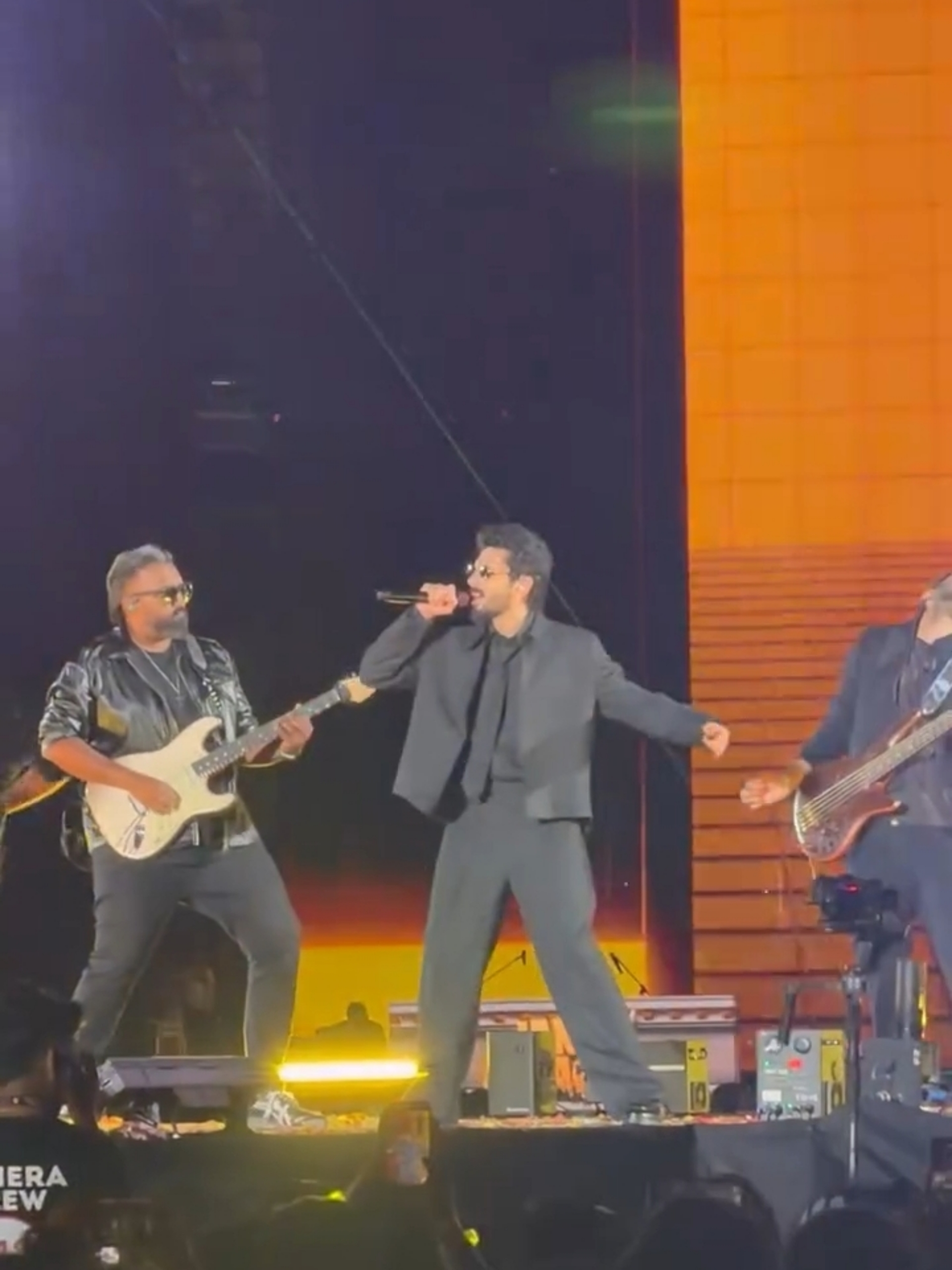
Anirudh Ravichander performing at Jana Nayagan Audio Launch.

Music composer Anirudh Ravichander took the stage next and delivered a live performance of some of the film's tracks as well as Vijay's songs, including "Naa Ready", "Vaathi Coming", "Selfie Pulla", "Aathi", "Oru Pere Varalaaru", "Thalapathy Kacheri", "Badass" and "Ravana Mavan Da" for around 45 minutes.

The film's heroine, Pooja Hegde, then shares her experiences working with Vijay and expresses gratitude to the entire cast and crew. Director H. Vinoth follows, speaking about the film. A dance performance is presented by choreographers Prabhu Deva, Sandy, Sekhar, Shobi - Lalitha, Baba Bhaskar, Kalyan, Sridhar, Ashok Raja and Johny. Finally, Vijay addresses the audience, praising the film's cast and crew, and shares his final "Kutty Story". The event concludes with a group photo session featuring the entire cast and crew.

== Audience ==
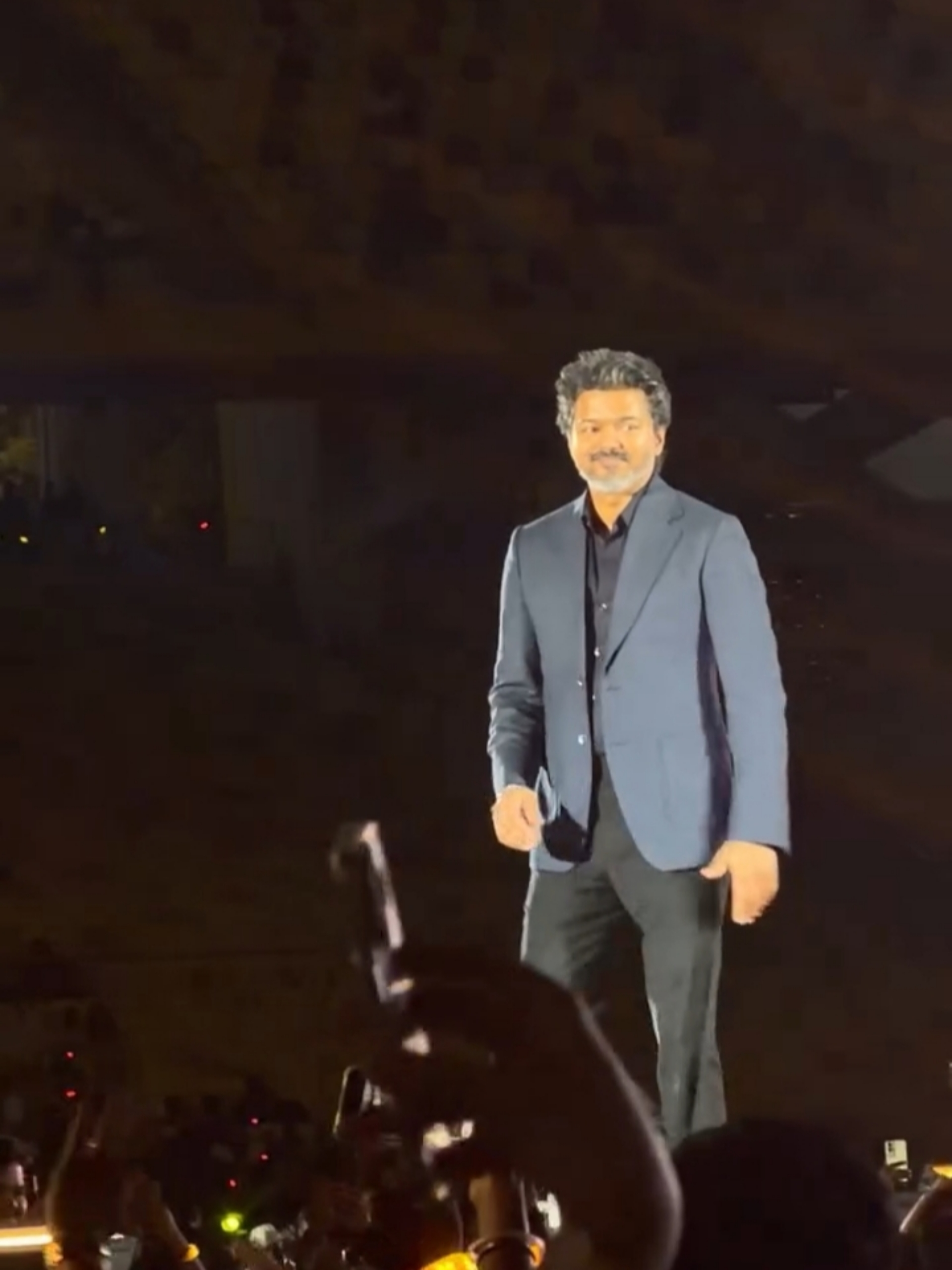
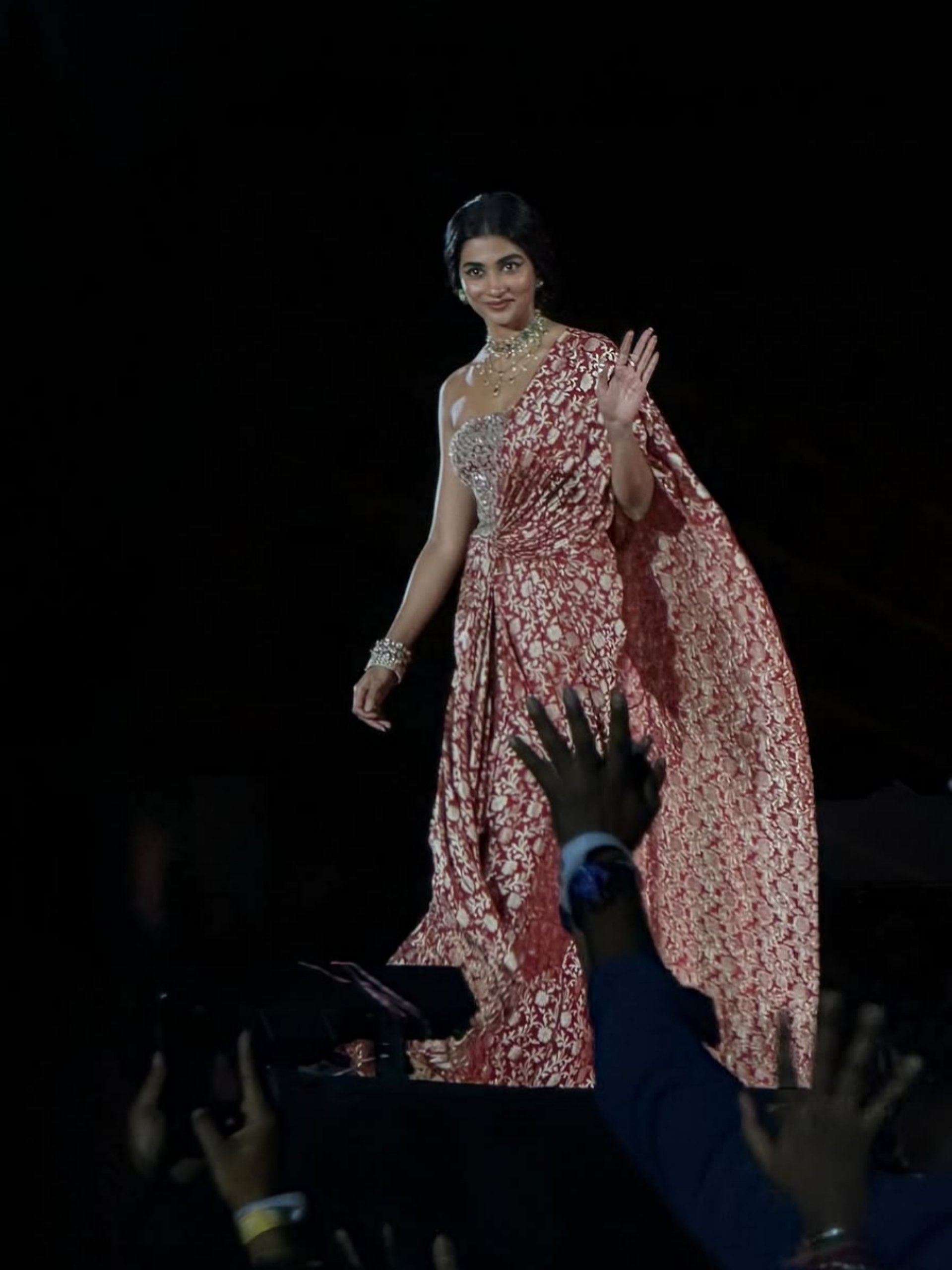
Vijay and Pooja Hegde at Jana Nayagan Audio Launch.

The venue hosted a record-breaking crowd, with over 100,000 attendees. On 26 December 2025, Chennai Airport was crowded with the fans heading to Kuala Lumpur, Malaysia for the audio launch event. On 27 December, fans began arriving several hours early, causing heavy traffic and road blockages throughout Malaysia.

The event took place under tight security managed by Malaysian authorities. Re-entry to the stadium was not permitted once the premises had been exited. Only children aged 5 and above were allowed entry, and each child had to possess an individual ticket; children below the age of 5 were not granted admission. The following items were strictly prohibited inside the venue: outside food, alcohol, cameras (including drone cameras), and any political-related items. In particular, no items associated with Vijay's Tamilaga Vettri Kazhagam (TVK) party—such as T-shirts, flags, badges, posters, umbrellas, or similar materials—were allowed. Additionally, any item that prominently displayed the TVK party flag colors of red and yellow was not permitted. Despite these restrictions, a attendee was arrested by the Royal Malaysia Police for displaying a TVK flag.. Although the audience was strictly prohibited from live streaming or uploading videos to social media, numerous concert videos rapidly appeared online, bypassing the event's security measures. Leaked clips from the event went viral on social media.

== Critical reception ==
Shreyanka Mazumdar of News18 wrote, "Singers like Tippu, Anuradha Sriram, and Saindhavi electrified the stage". The Week praised and noted that the event "had fantastic live music performances from Anirudh".

Bhawana Tanmayi of Moneycontrol noted, "Jana Nayagan's audio debut is no longer just a way to attract people to see the movie. It's hard to say goodbye because Vijay the actor is poised to become Vijay the leader." The Times of India wrote, "Although security measures and crowd-handling practices were in place, the venue was abuzz like a carnival, drowned in the spirit of frenzied celebration."

Risha Ganguly of Times Now wrote "The event features a nostalgic retrospective of Vijay's most iconic songs, alongside live performances of newly released tracks from Jana Nayagan. Music composer Anirudh Ravichander is leading the grand live orchestra, adding scale and emotion to the celebration." DT Next wrote "One of the most touching moments of the Jana Nayagan audio launch came when Vijay's mother took the stage to sing the Kodambakkam Area song from the film Sivakasi, a song closely associated with the actor's early years in cinema."

Zoom noted "The audio launch of Jana Nayagan is poised to be a heartfelt and spectacular event as Thalapathy Vijay prepares for what is anticipated to be his last film before fully committing to a political career." Mid-day wrote "With emotions running high and the music ready to take over, the Jan Neta audio launch emerged as a powerful celebration of cinema, fandom, and the enduring phenomenon that is Thalapathy Vijay."

India Today noted "The evening was regarded as historic, both for the film and Vijay's evolving career." Mathrubhumi wrote "The six-hour ceremony served as a cinematic wake for Vijay's three-decade career."

== Telecast ==
The event was not live streamed or telecasted. The streaming rights of the audio launch was acquired by ZEE5. The event telecasted on Zee Tamil and began streaming on ZEE5 on 4 January 2026.

== Set list ==
=== Thalapathy Thiruvizha ===
- "Meghamai Vanthu Pogiren"
- "Innisai Paadivarum"
- "Oru Pattam Poochi"
- "Melliname"
- "Molachu Moonu"
- "Mottu Onru"
- "Yenna Azhago"
- "Sakkarai Nilave"
- "Oru Kaditham"
- "Ennai Thalatta Varuvala"
- "Oru Ponnu Onnu"
- "Chinna Thamarai"
- "Valayapatti Thavile"
- "Rukku Rukku"
- "Maacho"
- "Kokkara Kokkarako"
- "Aal Thotta Boopathi"
- "Arjunar Villu"
- "Yeau Durra"
- "Thalaivaa Thalaivaa"
- "Ella Pugazhum"
- "Aalaporaan Thamizhan"
- "Naan adicha"
- "Puli Urumudhu"
- "Appadi Podu"

=== Unplugged ===
- "Un Per Solla"
- "Azhagooril"
- "Oru Naal Oru Kanavu"
- "Yen Pennendru"
- "En Jeevan"
- "Nee Yaaro"

=== Jana Nayagan Audio Launch ===
- "Naa Ready"
- "Vaathi Coming"
- "Selfie Pulla"
- "Aathi"
- "Oru Pere Varalaaru"
- "Thalapathy Kacheri"
- "Badass"
- "Raavana Mavandaa"

== Accolades ==
List of awards and nominations
Year	Ceremony	Category	Result	Ref.
2025	The Malaysia Book of Records	The largest audience for a single event in Malaysia	Won	
