= Kanagaraj Balakrishnan =

Malaysian tennis player (born 1988)

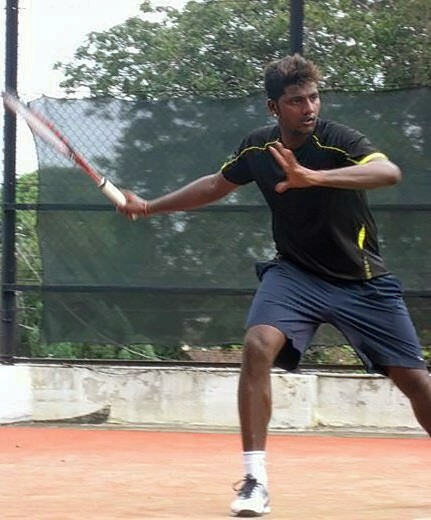
- Born: 18 January 1988 (age 38)

Kanagaraj Balakrishnan (born 18 January 1988) is a professional ATP Tennis Player from Malaysia.

He has played for Malaysia and also represented Malaysia in the 2007 SEA Games in Thailand.

Kanagaraj Balakrishnan is currently coached by Mon S Sudesh of Prospin Tennis Management. He played in the ATP 250 Event in Malaysia vs. Rohan Bopanna of India. His tennis career began at the Nike Bhupathi Tennis Academy in Bangalore, India.
