= S. Sarath Babu =

Malaysian footballer

Personal information
- Full name: Sarath Babu a/l Subramaniam
- Date of birth: 9 May 1980
- Place of birth: Batu Gajah, Perak, Malaysia
- Date of death: 5 November 2010 (aged 30)
- Place of death: Lahat, Perak, Malaysia
- Position: Midfielder

Senior career*
| Years | Team | Apps | (Gls) |
| 2003 | Perak TKN FC | 22 | (2) |
| 2008–2009 | Perak FA | | |
- * Club domestic league appearances and goals

Sarath Babu a/l Subramaniam (9 May 1980 – 5 November 2010) was a Malaysian footballer.

== Club career ==
Professionally, he played with Perak TKN FC in the 2003 Malaysian Premier Two, and with Perak FA for the 2009 Super League season. He was also playing at amateur level for various teams in the Perak state leagues.

=== Death ===
He was killed in an accident at Lahat, Perak on 5 November 2010.
