= Bukit Jalil National Stadium =

Stadium in Kuala Lumpur, Malaysia

Coordinates: 3°03′17″N 101°41′28″E

TM National Stadium
- TM Stadium Nasional
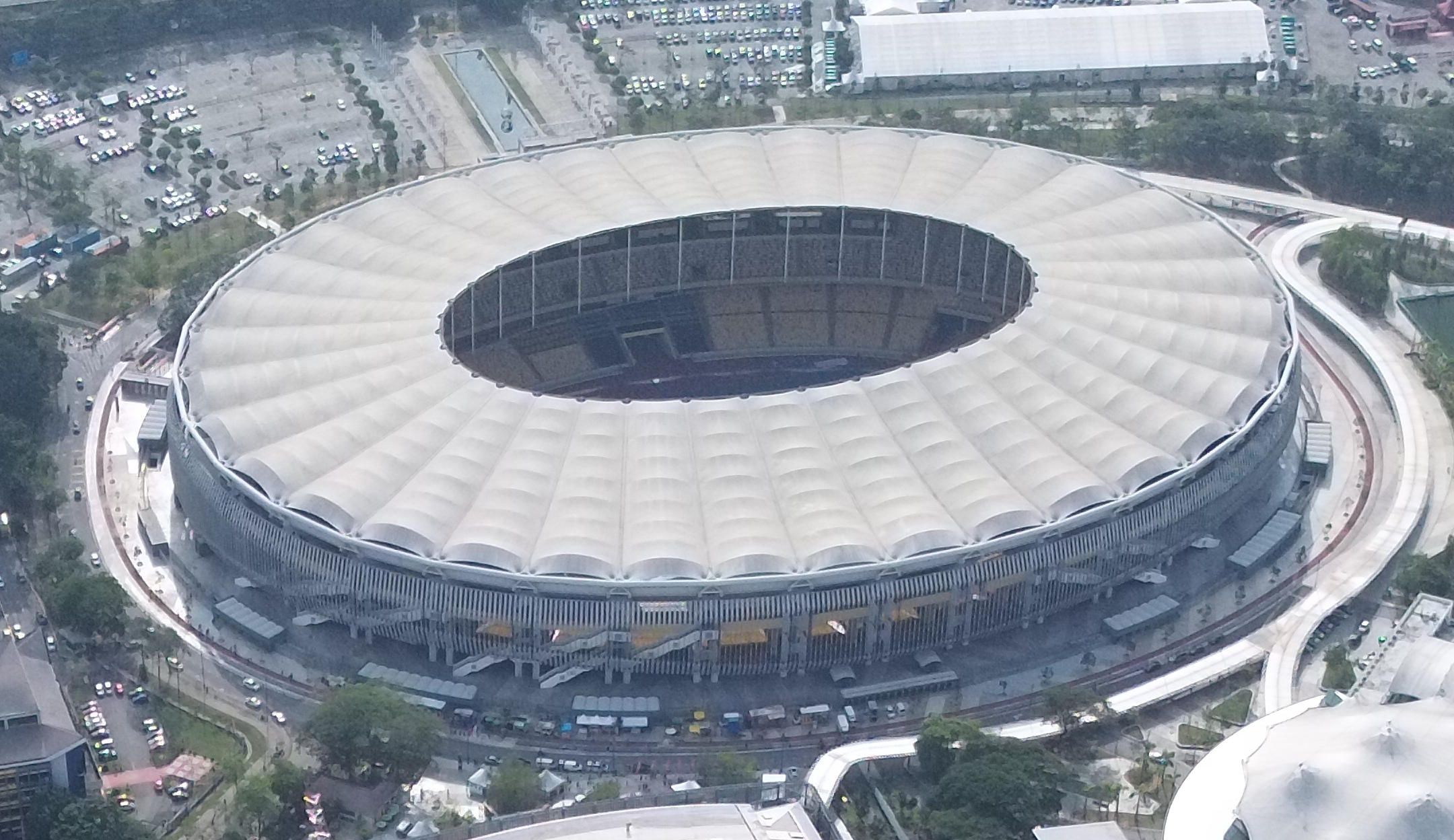
- Bukit Jalil National Stadium in 2023
- Interactive map of TM National Stadium
- Location: Bukit Jalil, Kuala Lumpur, Malaysia
- Owner: Government of Malaysia
- Operator: KL Sports City
- Capacity: 100,000 (1998–2017); 90,000 (Just 87,411 are used) (2017–present)
- Surface: Zeon Zoysia grass Track
- Scoreboard: Samsung LED panel
- Record attendance: 100,000 (Thalapathy Thiruvizha – Jana Nayagan Audio Launch, 27 December 2025)
- Field size: 105 by 68 m (344 by 223 ft)
- Public transit: SP17 Bukit Jalil LRT station

Construction
- Built: 1 January 1995; 31 years ago
- Opened: 11 July 1998; 28 years ago
- Renovated: 1998, 2015–2017
- Reopened: July 2017; 9 years ago
- Cost: RM 1 Billion
- Architects: Arkitek FAA; Weidleplan Consulting Gmbh; Schlaich Bergermann Partner; Populous in association with RSP KL (2017 renovation)
- Main contractors: UEM Group; Malaysian Resources Corporation Berhad (2017 renovation)

Tenants
- Malaysia national football team (1998–present); Malaysia Valke (2020)

The Bukit Jalil National Stadium (Malay: Stadium Nasional Bukit Jalil), also known as TM National Stadium (Malay: TM Stadium Nasional) for sponsorship reasons, is a multi-purpose stadium in Bukit Jalil, Kuala Lumpur, Malaysia. With a capacity of 87,500, it is the largest stadium in Southeast Asia, the fourth largest in Asia, and the twenty-third largest in the world.

It was officially inaugurated by fourth Prime Minister of Malaysia Mahathir Mohamad on 11 July 1998, ahead of the 1998 Commonwealth Games and staged its opening ceremony. Since then, it has become the main venue for other international events, such as the 2001 Southeast Asian Games and the 2017 Southeast Asian Games. Nowadays it hosts most of the Malaysian international football matches, national level competition finals such as the Malaysia FA Cup, Malaysia Cup, athletic events and concerts.

It was built alongside other sport venues in the National Sports Complex by the United Engineers Malaysia, and designed by Arkitek FAA, Weidleplan Consulting GMBH and Schlaich Bergermann Partner. A membrane structure is used for the roof, and most of the materials were reinforced concrete. Prior to this stadium, Stadium Merdeka served as the national stadium of Malaysia.

== History ==
The stadium was built on 1 January 1995 to host the 1998 Commonwealth Games. It finished exactly on 1 January 1998. After the 1998 Commonwealth Games in September, the stadium became the home stadium for the Malaysia national football team, replacing the Shah Alam Stadium and the Merdeka Stadium. It also served as the main stadium of the 2001 Southeast Asian Games, 2006 FESPIC Games, 2008 ASEAN University Games and 2017 Southeast Asian Games.

National Stadium's capacity makes it the 21st largest stadium in the world and the 9th largest football stadium in the world. It was built by United Engineers Malaysia, Bhd and designed by Arkitek FAA. It was completed three months ahead of schedule. Designed to host a multitude of events, the National Stadium is the central and most prominent sports venue at the 1.2 km^{2} National Sports Complex in Bukit Jalil.

Malaysia's previous national stadium was the Merdeka Stadium before the National Sports Complex was constructed. Malaysia also uses other stadiums for their football matches such as KLFA Stadium, MBPJ Stadium and the Shah Alam Stadium.

The stadium, along with the National Sports Complex, is currently undergoing a major renovation at a combined cost of RM1.34 billion as a part of KL Sports City project in 2 phases. Project 1 (Phase 1) has been completed ahead and for the 2017 SEA Games in Kuala Lumpur, with a new Populous-designed facade that covers the exterior of the stadium with twisted vertical louvres which are also LED-lighted, as well as recolouring the seats to a yellow-black design and upgraded facilities. After the 2017 ASEAN Para Games, Project 2 (Phase 2) will commence, and will add a retractable roof, retractable seats, comfort ventilation and new sports and lifestyle facilities.

=== Pitch issues ===
On 18 February 2020 to prevent another issue regarding the football pitch again in the future, the Malaysian Stadium Corporation (PSM) and Malaysia Ministry of Youth and Sports (KBS) announced a plan to upgrade the pitch from cow grass to zeon zoysia grass with an estimated cost of RM10 Million. The cost included the use of specialise machine and equipment for the grass. The plan upgrade will start later this year and is expected to be completed within the next three months.

== Stadium facilities ==
The stadium is equipped with the following facilities:

- 105 m x 68 m Zeon Zoysia pitch
- 9 laned 400m synthetic track
- 6m x 60m warming up track
- 1,500 flux floodlights
- Broadcast Studios
- Coloured Video Matrix Scoreboards
- High-tech Cathode Ray Tube Video Screen Board
- Individual "paddles" containing LED pixels at the seats

== Entertainment uses ==
National Stadium has been host to other important events besides football matches. Notable music artists who have performed in the stadium include:

Notable Music Performances at the National Stadium
Date	Main act(s)	Tour / Concert Name	Notes
23 & 24 April 1999	Jacky Cheung	Live In Malaysia Concert	"友个人演唱會" 大马站; First chinese act to perform two shows on a single tour
16 March 2002	Sammi Cheng	Shocking Color World Tour Concert	大马站
23 March 2002	Jacky Cheung	Music Odyssey World Tour Concert	"音乐之旅演唱會" 大马站
21 August 2004	Siti Nurhaliza	Fantasia Tour Finale Live	Bukit Jalil performance
6 November 2004	S.H.E	Fantasy Land World Tour	奇幻樂園吉隆坡演唱會
1 October 2005	Fish Leong	Love Parade	爱的大游行 Live in Malaysia
28 October 2006	David Tao	Love Can World Tour	就是愛你音樂驚奇之旅
27 January 2007	Rain	Rain's Coming World Tour	
6 March 2010	S.H.E	S.H.E is the One World Tour	愛而為一吉隆坡演唱會
19 August 2013	Linkin Park	Living Things World Tour	
13 April 2019	One Ok Rock	Eye of the Storm World Tour	
13 April 2019	Ed Sheeran	÷ Tour	
7 December 2019	JJ Lin	Sanctuary World Tour	"圣所2.0"世界巡回演唱会
18 August 2022	Billie Eilish	Happier Than Ever, The World Tour	
18 December 2022	JJ Lin	JJ20 World Tour	"JJ20"世界巡回演唱会
15 January 2023	Jay Chou	Carnival World Tour	"嘉年华"世界巡回演唱会
11 February 2023	Mayday	Fly to 2023 World Tour	"好好好想见到你"巡回演唱会
4 March 2023	Blackpink	Born Pink World Tour	
29 July 2023	Muse	Will of the People World Tour	
22 November 2023	Coldplay	Music of the Spheres World Tour	
24 February 2024	Ed Sheeran	+–=÷× Tour	
27 July 2024	A. R. Rahman	A. R. Rahman Live In Kuala Lumpur	
17 September 2024	Bruno Mars	Bruno Mars Live	
26 October 2024	Jay Chou	Carnival World Tour	"嘉年华"世界巡回演唱会
23 November 2024	Joker Xue	Extraterrestrial World Tour	"天外来物"巡回演唱会 海外体育场·返场
15 February 2025	G.E.M.	I Am Gloria World Tour	"I Am Gloria"世界巡回演唱会
10 May 2025	JJ Lin	JJ20 Final Lap World Tour	"JJ20 Final Lap"世界巡回演唱会
27 December 2025	Anirudh Ravichander, Anuradha Sriram, S. P. Charan, Tippu, Andrea Jeremiah, Vijay Yesudas, Saindhavi, Haricharan, Harish Raghavendra Yogi B, Emcee Jasz and Dr. Burn	Thalapathy Thiruvizha	The most attended concert in Malaysia with a record-breaking attendance of over 100,000 fans
27 December 2025	Vijay, H. Vinoth and Pooja Hegde	Jana Nayagan Audio Launch	The most attended concert in Malaysia with a record-breaking attendance of over 100,000 fans
10 January 2026	Siti Nurhaliza	Legacy 30 Siti Nurhaliza Concert	
31 January 2026	Mayday	5525 Back to That Day Tour	"回到那一天"巡回演唱会
6 June 2026	G.E.M.	I Am Gloria World Tour	"I Am Gloria"世界巡回演唱会 2.0
27 September 2026	Post Malone	BIG ASS World Tour (Note: Postponed)	
17 October 2026	Siti Nurhaliza	Konsert Tradisional Gema Bumantara	
4 & 5 November 2026	The Weeknd	After Hours til Dawn Tour	First international act to perform two shows on a single tour
19 & 20 November 2026	My Chemical Romance	South East Asia Tour 2026	First international band to perform two shows on a single tour
12 & 13 December 2026	BTS	Arirang World Tour	First K-Pop group to perform two shows on a single tour
9 & 10 January 2027	BigBang	XX: Cosmos World Tour	Second K-Pop group to perform two shows on a single tour
23 January 2027	Jay Chou	Carnival II World Tour	"稻香 马来西亚 嘉年华II"世界巡回演唱会

== Sporting events ==
- Athletics – 1998 Commonwealth Games, 2001 Southeast Asian Games, 2001 ASEAN Para Games, 2008 ASEAN University Games, 2009 ASEAN Para Games, 2015 ASEAN Civil Service Games, 2017 Southeast Asian Games, and 2017 ASEAN Para Games.
- Football at the 2001 SEA Games (Malaysia vs Vietnam only)
- Malaysia Cup finals
- Malaysian FA Cup finals
- 2003 FA Premier League Asia Cup
- 2007 AFC Asian Cup
- 2007 Champions Youth Cup
- Manchester United 2001, 2009 Asia Tour
- 2010 AFF Championship, first leg Semifinals and Finals
- Liverpool F.C. Asia Tour 2011
- Chelsea F.C. 2011 summer tour of Asia
- Arsenal F.C. 2011, 2012 Pre-Season Asia Tour
- Franciscan Super Cup Final 2013
- 2014 AFF Championship second leg finals
- Liverpool F.C. Second Asia Tour 2015
- 2018 AFF Championship, first leg semifinals and finals
- 2019 Malaysia FA Cup Final
- 2022 FIFA World Cup qualification
- 2022 AFC Cup Final
- 2022 AFF Championship, first leg semifinals
- 2023 Merdeka Tournament
- 2026 FIFA World Cup qualification
- 2025 Manchester United Asian Tour (Manchester United vs ASEAN All Stars)

== Tournament results ==
=== 2001 SEA Games ===
Date	Team #1	Res.	Team #2	Round	Attendance
11 September 2001	Malaysia	2–0	Vietnam	Group stage	N/A

=== AFF/ASEAN Championship ===
Date	Team #1	Res.	Team #2	Round	Attendance	Competition
8 December 2004	Philippines	0–1	Myanmar	Group stage	N/A	2004 AFF Championship
8 December 2004	Malaysia	5–0	Timor-Leste	Group stage	N/A	2004 AFF Championship
10 December 2004	Thailand	1–1	Myanmar	Group stage	N/A	2004 AFF Championship
10 December 2004	Malaysia	4–1	Philippines	Group stage	N/A	2004 AFF Championship
12 December 2004	Timor-Leste	0–8	Thailand	Group stage	N/A	2004 AFF Championship
12 December 2004	Malaysia	0–1	Myanmar	Group stage	N/A	2004 AFF Championship
14 December 2004	Philippines	2–1	Timor-Leste	Group stage	N/A	2004 AFF Championship
14 December 2004	Malaysia	2–1	Thailand	Group stage	N/A	2004 AFF Championship
16 December 2004	Myanmar	3–1	Timor-Leste	Group stage	N/A	2004 AFF Championship
3 January 2005	Malaysia	1–4	Indonesia	Semi-finals second leg	N/A	2004 AFF Championship
15 December 2010	Malaysia	2–0	Vietnam	Semi-finals first leg	45,000	2010 AFF Championship
26 December 2010	Malaysia	3–0	Indonesia	Finals first leg	98,543	2010 AFF Championship
25 November 2012	Indonesia	2–2	Laos	Group stage	N/A	2012 AFF Championship
25 November 2012	Malaysia	0–3	Singapore	Group stage	N/A	2012 AFF Championship
28 November 2012	Indonesia	1–0	Singapore	Group stage	N/A	2012 AFF Championship
28 November 2012	Laos	1–4	Malaysia	Group stage	N/A	2012 AFF Championship
1 December 2012	Malaysia	2–0	Indonesia	Group stage	N/A	2012 AFF Championship
9 December 2012	Malaysia	1–1	Thailand	Semifinals first leg	N/A	2012 AFF Championship
20 December 2014	Malaysia	3–2 (3–4 on aggregate)	Thailand	Finals second leg	N/A	2014 AFF Championship
12 November 2018	Malaysia	3–1	Laos	Group stage	12,127	2018 AFF Championship
24 November 2018	Malaysia	3–0	Myanmar	Group stage	83,777	2018 AFF Championship
1 December 2018	Malaysia	0–0	Thailand	Semi-finals first leg	87,545	2018 AFF Championship
11 December 2018	Malaysia	2–2	Vietnam	Finals first leg	88,482	2018 AFF Championship
24 December 2022	Malaysia	5–0	Laos	Group stage	29,961	2022 AFF Championship
3 January 2023	Malaysia	4–1	Singapore	Group stage	65,147	2022 AFF Championship
7 January 2023	Malaysia	1–0	Thailand	Semi-final 1st leg	62,989	2022 AFF Championship
11 December 2024	Malaysia	3–2	Timor-Leste	Group stage	7,420	2024 ASEAN Championship
20 December 2024	Malaysia	0–0	Singapore	Group stage	31,127	2024 ASEAN Championship

=== 2007 AFC Asian Cup ===
Date	Team #1	Res.	Team #2	Round	Attendance
10 July 2007	Malaysia	1–5	China	Group C	21,155
11 July 2007	Iran	2–1	Uzbekistan	Group C	1,863
14 July 2007	Uzbekistan	5–0	Malaysia	Group C	7,137
15 July 2007	China	2–2	Iran	Group C	5,938
18 July 2007	Malaysia	0–2	Iran	Group C	4,520
22 July 2007	Iran	0–0 (a.e.t.) (2–4 pen.)	South Korea	Quarter-finals	8,629
25 July 2007	Iraq	0–0 (a.e.t.) (4–3 pen.)	South Korea	Semi-finals	12,500

=== 2018 AFC U-16 Championship ===
Date	Time (UTC+08)	Team #1	Res.	Team #2	Round	Attendance
20 September 2018	16:30	Malaysia	6–2	Tajikistan	Group Stage	723
21 September 2018	16:30	Iran	0–2	Indonesia	Group Stage	3,431
23 September 2018	16:30	Thailand	4–2	Malaysia	Group Stage	8,596
24 September 2018	16:30	India	0–0	Iran	Group Stage	186
24 September 2018	20:45	Indonesia	1–1	Vietnam	Group Stage	11,201
27 September 2018	11:00 (Note: Due to weather conditions (heavy rainfall and lightning), both Matchday 3 matches in Group A were postponed from 26 September, 16:30 (and initially pushed to 17:30) to 27 September, 11:00.)	Malaysia	0–2	Japan	Group Stage	8,378
27 September 2018	16:30	Yemen	5–1	Jordan	Group Stage	531
27 September 2018	20:45	India	0–0	Indonesia	Group Stage	11,388
30 September 2018	16:30	Japan	2–1	Oman	Quarter-finals	267
1 October 2018	16:30	Indonesia	2–3	Australia	Quarter-finals	13,743
4 October 2018	16:30	Japan	3–1	Australia	Semi-finals	224
7 October 2018	20:45	Japan	1–0	Tajikistan	Final	352

=== 2019 Airmarine Cup ===
Date	Time (UTC+08)	Team #1	Res.	Team #2	Round	Attendance
20 March 2019	16:30	Oman	5–0	Afghanistan	Semi-finals	N/A
20 March 2019	20:45	Malaysia	0–1	Singapore	Semi-finals	N/A
23 March 2019	16:30	Afghanistan	1–2	Malaysia	Third-place playoff	N/A
23 March 2019	20:45	Oman	1–1 (5–4 pen.)	Singapore	Final	N/A

=== Man Utd Tour 2025 ===
Date	Time (UTC+08)	Team #1	Res.	Team #2	Round	Attendance
28 May 2025	20:45	ASEAN All Stars	1—0	(England) Manchester United	Hybrid Friendly	72,550

== Gallery ==
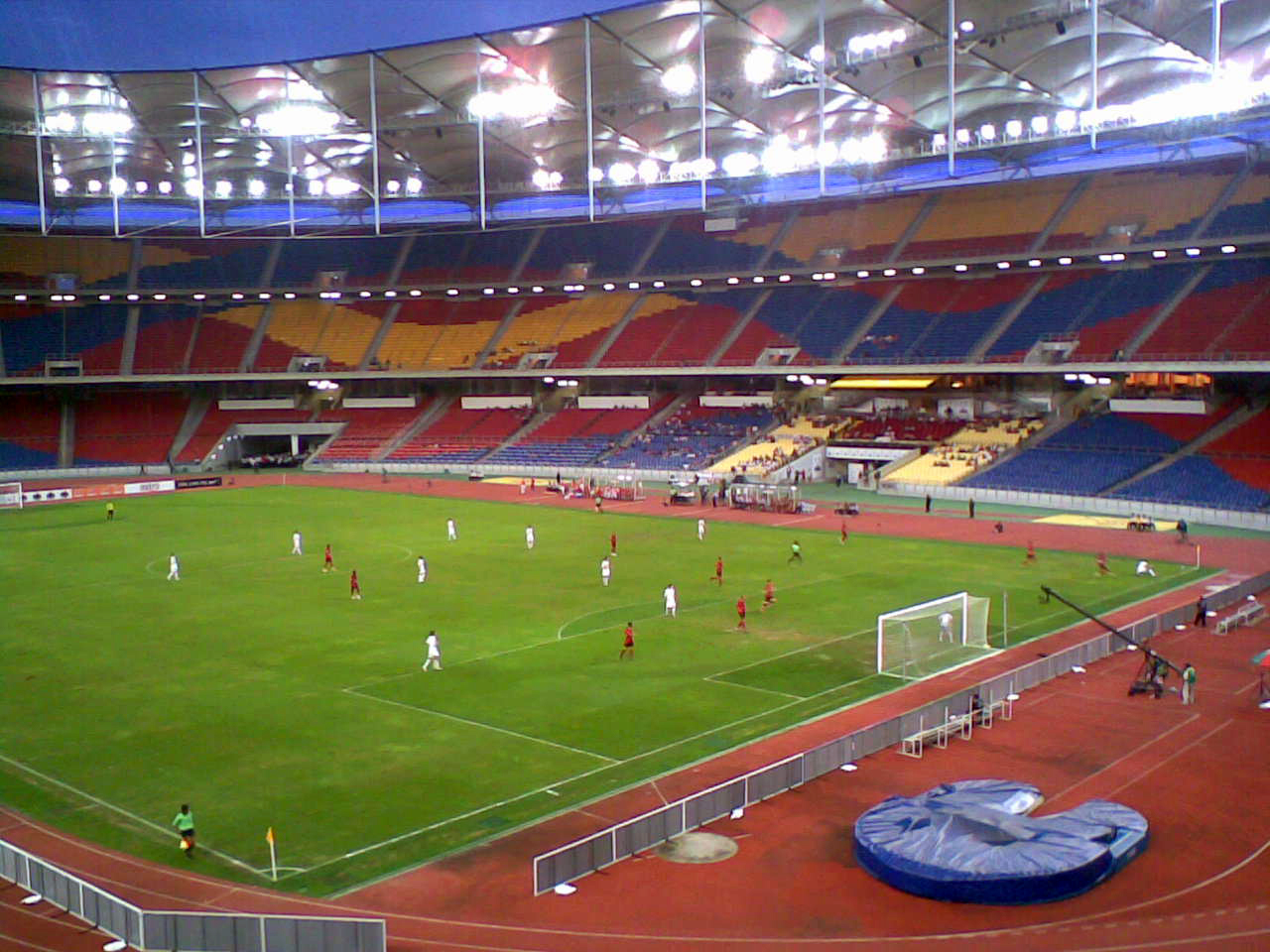
The stadium in 2007

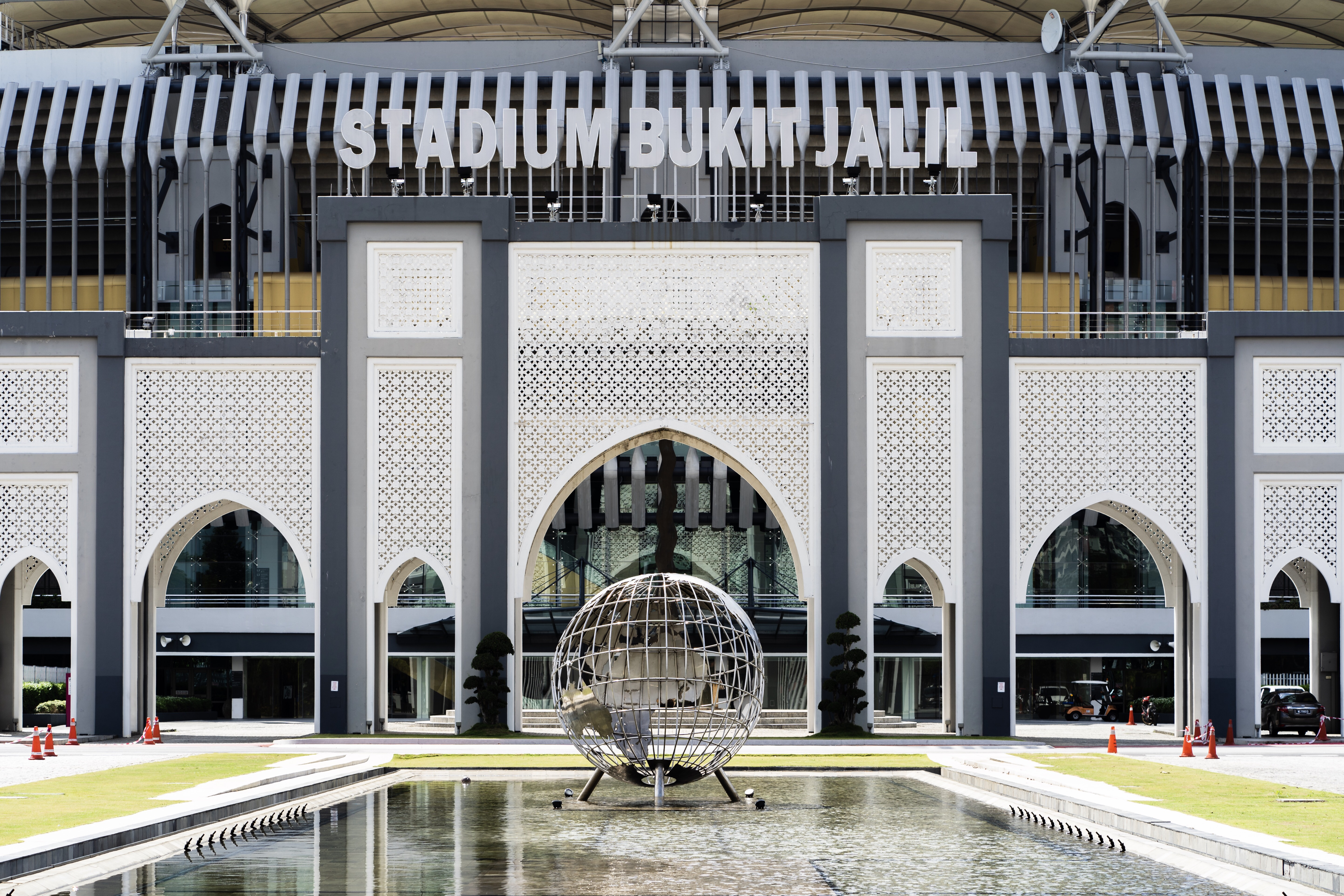
Gate in front of the National Stadium

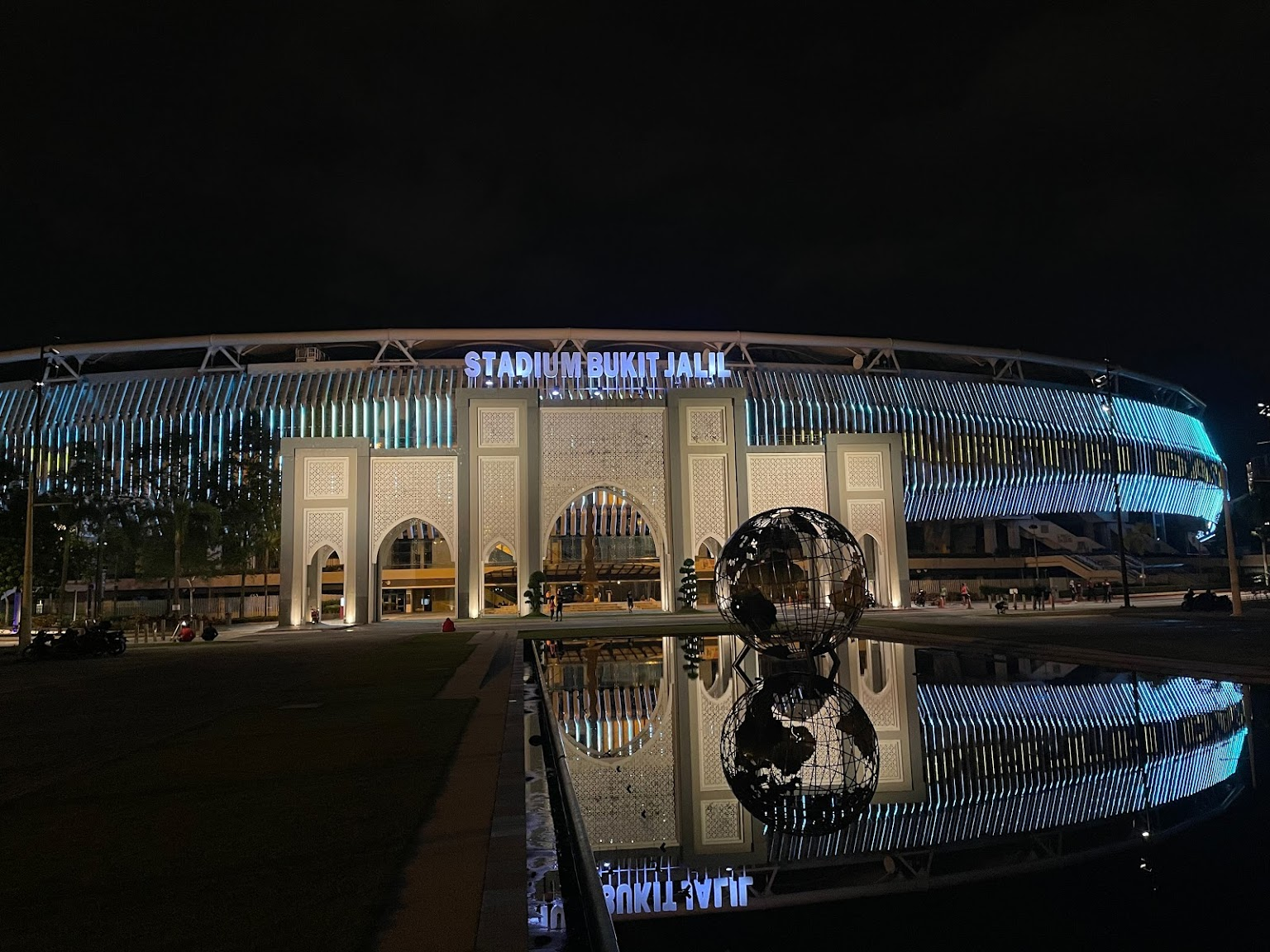
The stadium at night

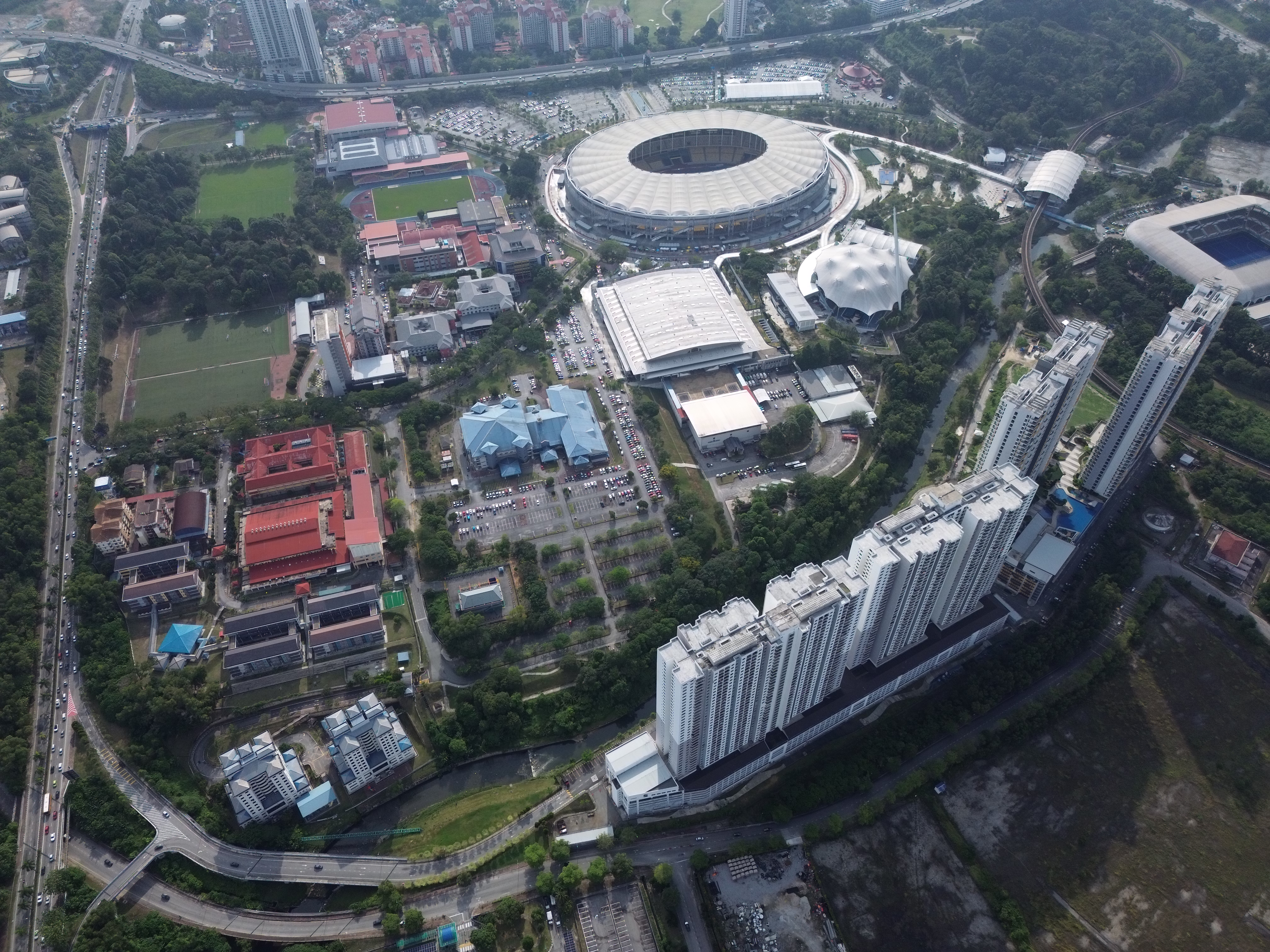
Sky viewpoint to the stadium

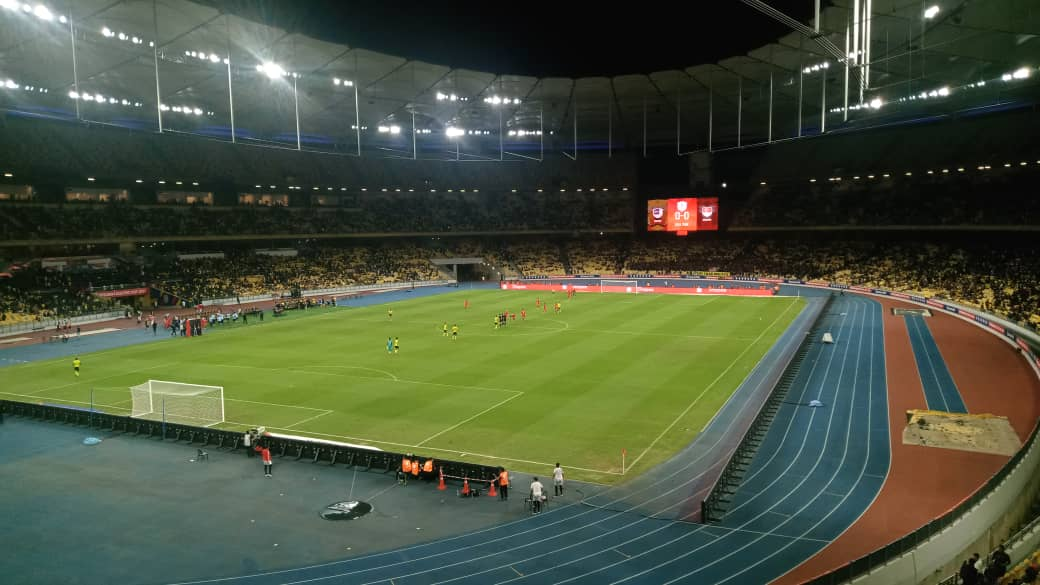
The inside of Bukit Jalil Stadium during 2024 ASEAN Championship match of Malaysia against Singapore

== See also ==
- List of stadiums
- List of stadiums in Malaysia
- List of Asian stadiums by capacity
- List of stadiums by capacity
- List of Southeast Asia stadiums by capacity
- Football Association of Malaysia
- List of association football stadiums by capacity

== Notes ==
Preceded by Centennial Stadium; Victoria, Canada	Host of the Commonwealth Games; 1998	Succeeded by City of Manchester Stadium; Manchester, United Kingdom
Preceded by None	Premier League Asia Trophy; Venue; 2003	Succeeded by Rajamangala Stadium; Bangkok, Thailand
