= The Malaysia Book of Records =

Reference book listing Malaysian records

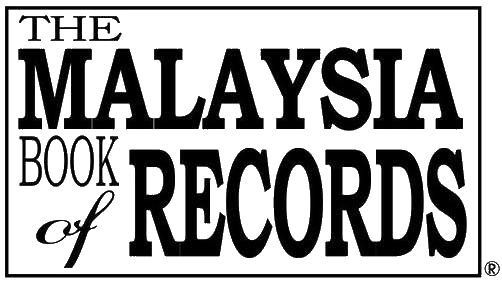
- Language: English; Malay
- Subject: National records
- Publication place: Malaysia
- English publication date: 27 August 1998 – present
- Media type: Book
- Website: www.malaysiarecords.com.my

The Malaysia Book of Records (or MBR) is a Malaysian project to publish records set or broken by Malaysians. The project complements Prime Minister Mahathir Mohamad's 'Malaysia Boleh!' (Malaysia Can! in English) campaign. As with the Guinness World Records, there is an annually published book listing the records.

== Aims ==
The MBR is a project formed in line with Vision 2020.

Realising that feats and record attempts were not recorded, Datuk Danny Ooi (founder of The Malaysia Book of Records) felt that recognition should be given to record achievements by Malaysians. As the National Record-Keeper, MBR is an official body that recognises record-holders, record-breakers, and record creators in the country. Upon confirmation of a record, the MBR issues a certificate to the record holder as a recognition of their efforts.

== History ==
The idea was conceived in 1990 when Danny Ooi stumbled upon questions regarding extraordinary feats by Malaysians. He recalled seeing a man cycling for days at the Merdeka Stadium, trying to set a world record, and another individual, who travelled from state to state by walking. The latter was hoping his attempt would be entered in the Guinness Book of World Records.

Realising that none of these feats would be recorded, Ooi felt that recognition should be given to such determination exhibited by Malaysians.

Achievements were compiled for publication into the MBR and were also shown in a weekly TV series called The Malaysia Book of Records, which debuted on October 6, 1996 on RTM TV2. The MBR acknowledges Malaysians who have promoted their country by creating records.

The first record book, entitled The Malaysia Book of Records' First Edition, was launched on December 9, 1998, combining the Malaysian records in one book for the first time.

== Award ceremony ==
MBR Awards Night at the national and state level started in December 1998, when the Malaysia Book of Records organised a national level and two states' level, Sabah and Melaka respectively, at MBR Awards Night.

== See also ==
- Indonesian World Records Museum

Malaysian record breakers and achievements

- KL Tower
- Nicol David
- M. Magendran
- Petronas Twin Towers
- Vision 2020
- Arulmigu Sri Rajakaliamman Glass Temple
- Penang Second Bridge
- Goh Jin Wei
- Goh Liu Ying
- Rainforest World Music Festival
- Thalapathy Thiruvizha – Jana Nayagan Audio Launch
