= Nandakumar Puspanathan =

Nandakumar Puspanathan (born 23 June 1974), is a Malaysian rally driver.

He began his rally career in the Malaysian Rally Championship 2001, driving a privately entered Proton Satria 1600. He soon gained a reputation for clocking spectacularly quick stage times.

In 2004, Nandakumar teamed up with co-driver Suresh Parkash Sharma and the pair began chalking up class victories and top-five overall finishes.

The pair went on to win the National 1600 Championship for the year and were awarded the "Malaysian Most Promising Rally Driver Award for 2004" by the Automobile Association of Malaysia.

The following year saw Nandakumar and Suresh Sharma contracted to factory team, Perodua M5 Racing Team.

Piloting the diminutive Perodua Kelisa 1.3 to numerous top-five finishes overall and countless class wins showcased the talent and versatility of the pair and they went on to finish fifth overall and win the National Championship in their category in 2006.

With the introduction of the Myvi by Perodua, an experimental 1.6 litre Front wheel drive rally version made its debut in mid-2007 with Nandakumar at the wheel.

The prototype however was constantly plagued by electrical gremlins and mechanical failures and although the pair achieved a few podium finishes in the car, there were quite a number of retirements as well.

After a transmission failure in the second round of the Malaysian Rally Championship 2008, Nandakumar was dropped by the Perodua Rally Team, citing race based policies as the reason for the decision. Not surprisingly, Nandakumar, a Malaysian born ethnic Indian was later replaced by rally driver Jamaludin Tukmin, an ethnic Malay.

Unfazed, Nandakumar and Suresh Sharma entered the following round in their old 1.8 litre Proton Satria as privateers and finished that round on the podium ahead of their former teammates.

In the following rounds, the duo secured a drive with the GSR – Pennzoil Racing Team and proceeded to dominate the Malaysian Rally Championship at every round while extending their lead in the 2 wheel drive category. Nandakumar completed the 2008 Malaysian rally Championship as the 2 wheel drive champion but without resources or career progression options, he shifted his focus to automotive engineering.

Nandakumar is also an automotive engineer, trained by Lotus Engineering as a chassis development engineer and test driver. His combination of driving and engineering ability has since helped him advance a career in vehicle dynamics in the automotive and motorsport industry.

== Sources ==
- http://www.hypertunemag.com/news/epitome-of-passion-and-talent-in-a-true-malaysian/
- http://www.nk-ssrallying.blog.com
- http://www.perodua.com.my/index.php?section=rally&year=2007
- http://www.zerotohundred.com/newforums/rallying/80522-malaysian-rally-championship-news.html
- http://www.malaysianrally.com/
- Hypertune, November 2004
- Carma, February 2006
- The Malay Mail, 27 January 2007
