= 2004 Champions Trophy squads =

List of teams from a 2004 cricket tournament

These were the 12 teams picked to take part in the 2004 ICC Champions Trophy, the third instalment of the Champions Trophy cricket tournament. The tournament was held in England from 10 September to 25 September 2004. Teams could name a preliminary squad of 30, but only 14-man squads were permitted for the actual tournament.

== Group A ==
Australia	New Zealand	United States
Ricky Ponting (c); Adam Gilchrist (wk); Michael Clarke; Jason Gillespie; Ian Harvey; Matthew Hayden; Brad Hogg; Michael Kasprowicz; Brett Lee; Darren Lehmann; Damien Martyn; Glenn McGrath; Andrew Symonds; Shane Watson	Stephen Fleming (c); Nathan Astle; Ian Butler; Chris Cairns; Chris Harris; Hamish Marshall; Brendon McCullum (wk); Craig McMillan; Kyle Mills; Jacob Oram; Michael Papps; Scott Styris; Daryl Tuffey; Daniel Vettori	Richard Staple (c); Nasir Javed; Charles Reid; Jignesh Desai; Howard Johnson; Aijaz Ali; Mark Johnson (wk); Leon Romero; Naseer Islam; Rohan Alexander; Rashid Zia; Steve Massiah; Clayton Lambert; Donovan Blake

== Group B ==
Bangladesh	South Africa	West Indies
Rajin Saleh (c); Mohammad Ashraful; Javed Omar; Nafees Iqbal; Aftab Ahmed; Mushfiqur Rahman; Khaled Mahmud; Khaled Mashud (wk); Mohammad Rafique; Manjural Islam Rana; Tapash Baisya; Tareq Aziz; Mohammad Nazmul Hossain; Faisal Hossain	Graeme Smith (c); Mark Boucher (wk); Nicky Boje; Alan Dawson; J.P. Duminy; Herschelle Gibbs; Jacques Kallis; Lance Klusener; Makhaya Ntini; Robin Peterson; Shaun Pollock; Jacques Rudolph; Martin van Jaarsveld; Charl Langeveldt	Brian Lara (c); Ian Bradshaw; Dwayne Bravo; Courtney Browne (wk); Shivnarine Chanderpaul; Corey Collymore; Mervyn Dillon; Chris Gayle; Ryan Hinds; Wavell Hinds; Sylvester Joseph; Ricardo Powell; Ramnaresh Sarwan; Darren Sammy

== Group C ==
India	Kenya	Pakistan
Sourav Ganguly (c); Virender Sehwag; Rahul Dravid (wk); VVS Laxman; Yuvraj Singh; Mohammad Kaif; Ajit Agarkar; Dinesh Karthik (wk); Anil Kumble; Harbhajan Singh; Lakshmipathy Balaji; Ashish Nehra; Irfan Pathan; Rohan Gavaskar	Steve Tikolo (c); Kennedy Otieno (wk); Ravindu Shah; Hitesh Modi; Malhar Patel; Thomas Odoyo; Ragheb Aga; Martin Suji; Peter Ongondo; Lameck Onyango; Tony Suji; Maurice Ouma; Josephat Ababu; Brijal Patel	Inzamam-ul-Haq (c); Yasir Hameed; Imran Farhat; Salman Butt; Mohammad Yousuf; Younis Khan; Moin Khan (wk); Shoaib Malik; Abdul Razzaq; Shahid Afridi; Shoaib Akhtar; Mohammad Sami; Naved-ul-Hasan; Azhar Mahmood

== Group D ==
England	Sri Lanka	Zimbabwe
Michael Vaughan (c); James Anderson; Gareth Batty; Paul Collingwood; Andrew Flintoff; Ashley Giles; Darren Gough; Stephen Harmison; Geraint Jones (wk); Anthony McGrath; Vikram Solanki; Andrew Strauss; Marcus Trescothick; Alex Wharf	Marvan Atapattu (c); Sanath Jayasuriya; Kumar Sangakkara (wk); Mahela Jayawardene; Tillakaratne Dilshan; Chaminda Vaas; Farveez Maharoof; Lasith Malinga; Nuwan Zoysa; Dilhara Fernando; Saman Jayantha; Avishka Gunawardene; Upul Chandana; Kaushal Lokuarachchi	Tatenda Taibu (c) (wk); Dion Ebrahim; Brendan Taylor; Mark Vermeulen; Alester Maregwede; Vusi Sibanda; Stuart Matsikenyeri; Tawanda Mupariwa; Mluleki Nkala; Tinashe Panyangara; Douglas Hondo; Edward Rainsford; Elton Chigumbura; Prosper Utseya
