= 2004 Six Nations Challenge =

2004 ICC Six Nations Challenge
- Dates: 29 February – 6 March 2004
- Administrator: ICC
- Cricket format: List A (50 overs)
- Tournament format: Round-robin
- Host: UAE
- Champions: United States (1st title)
- Participants: 6
- Matches: 15
- Most runs: (United States) Clayton Lambert (214)
- Most wickets: (Scotland) John Blain (10)

The 2004 ICC Six Nations Challenge was an international limited-overs cricket tournament held in the United Arab Emirates from 29 February to 6 March 2004. Matches were played in Dubai and Sharjah.

The tournament was the third and final edition of the ICC Six Nations Challenge, and featured six associate members of the International Cricket Council (ICC). Canada, Namibia, and the Netherlands had competed in the 2003 World Cup, while the three other teams invited were Scotland, the United Arab Emirates, and the United States. The six teams played each other once in a round-robin, with five teams finishing with three wins and two losses. The United States emerged as the winners based on net run rate, and consequently qualified for the 2004 ICC Champions Trophy in England, making their One Day International (ODI) debut. American all-rounder Clayton Lambert led the tournament in runs, while Scotland's John Blain was the leading wicket-taker.

== Squads ==
Each team named a squad of 14 players, one coach, one team manager, one physiotherapist, and one umpire.

| Canada Coach: Bryan Mauricette | Namibia Coach: Kevin Curran | Netherlands Coach: Emmerson Trotman |
|---|---|---|
| Joseph Harris (c); Ashish Bagai; Desmond Chumney; Austin Codrington; Sunil Dhaniram; Zahid Hussain; Shantha Jayasekera; Ian Khan; Ishwar Maraj; Don Maxwell; Asif Mulla; Ashish Patel; Kevin Sandher; Zubin Surkari | Jan-Berrie Burger (c); Louis Burger; Sarel Burger; Danie Keulder; Bjorn Kotze; Deon Kotze; Hugo Ludik; Gerrie Snyman; Stephan Swanepoel; Johannes van der Merwe; Burton van Rooi; Melt van Schoor; Rudi van Vuuren; Riaan Walters | Luuk van Troost (c); Tim de Leede; Jacob-Jan Esmeijer; Sebastiaan Gokke; Tjade Groot; Feiko Kloppenburg; Hendrik-Jan Mol; Adeel Raja; Darron Reekers; Edgar Schiferli; Chris Smith; Jeroen Smits; Daan van Bunge; Bas Zuiderent |
| Scotland Coach: Tony Judd | United Arab Emirates Coach: Syed Abid Ali | United States Coach: Faoud Bacchus |
| Craig Wright (c); John Blain; James Brinkley; Dougie Brown; Gavin Hamilton; Majid Haq; Paul Hoffmann; Jamie Kerr; Dougie Lockhart; Gregor Maiden; Ian Stanger; Ryan Watson; Fraser Watts; Greig Williamson | Khurram Khan (c); Ahmed Nadeem; Ali Asad; Arshad Ali; Asghar Ali; Asim Saeed; Fahad Usman; Mohammad Afzal; Mohammad Nadeem; Mohammad Tauqir; Naeemuddin Aslam; Nasir Siddiqi; Syed Maqsood; Yogesh Mistry | Richard Staple (c); Amer Afzaluddin; Rohan Alexander; Aijaz Ali; Zamin Amin; Donovan Blake; Jignesh Desai; Nasir Javed; Howard Johnson; Mark Johnson; Rahul Kukreti; Clayton Lambert; Steve Massiah; Tony Reid |

== Points table ==
| Team | Pld | W | L | T | NR | Pts | NRR |
|---|---|---|---|---|---|---|---|
| United States | 5 | 3 | 2 | 0 | 0 | 6 | +0.551 |
| Scotland | 5 | 3 | 2 | 0 | 0 | 6 | +0.523 |
| Namibia | 5 | 3 | 2 | 0 | 0 | 6 | +0.150 |
| Netherlands | 5 | 3 | 2 | 0 | 0 | 6 | +0.127 |
| United Arab Emirates | 5 | 3 | 2 | 0 | 0 | 6 | –0.056 |
| Canada | 5 | 0 | 5 | 0 | 0 | 0 | –1.212 |

== Fixtures ==
29 February
Scorecard

| Namibia; 254/8 (50 overs) | v | United States; 258/5 (46.5 overs) |

United States won by 5 wickets
Sharjah Cricket Stadium, Sharjah
Player of the match: Clayton Lambert (US)

29 February
Scorecard

| Netherlands; 198/8 (50 overs) | v | Scotland; 163 (47 overs) |

Netherlands won by 35 runs
Dubai Cricket Council Ground No 1, Dubai
Player of the match: Luuk van Troost (Ned)

29 February
Scorecard

| Canada; 157/9 (50 overs) | v | UAE; 160/5 (33.3 overs) |

UAE won by 5 wickets
Dubai Cricket Council Ground No 2, Dubai
Player of the match: Khurram Khan (UAE)

1 March
Scorecard

| Netherlands; 236/7 (50 overs) | v | Canada; 169 (41.4 overs) |

Netherlands won by 67 runs
Sharjah Cricket Stadium, Sharjah
Player of the match: Feiko Kloppenburg (Ned)

1 March
Scorecard

| Scotland; 160/8 (50 overs) | v | Namibia; 67 (22.5 overs) |

Scotland won by 93 runs
Dubai Cricket Council Ground No 1, Dubai
Player of the match: Paul Hoffmann (Sco)

1 March
Scorecard

| United States; 245/6 (50 overs) | v | UAE; 246/5 (46 overs) |

UAE won by 5 wickets
Dubai Cricket Council Ground No 2, Dubai
Player of the match: Khurram Khan (UAE)

3 March
Scorecard

| Canada; 126 (48.4 overs) | v | United States; 127/4 (24 overs) |

United States won by 6 wickets
Dubai Cricket Council Ground No 1, Dubai
Player of the match: Mark Johnson (US)

3 March
Scorecard

| Namibia; 247/5 (50 overs) | v | Netherlands; 174 (46.3 overs) |

Namibia won by 71 runs
Dubai Cricket Council Ground No 2, Dubai
Player of the match: Deon Kotze (Nam)

3 March
Scorecard

| Scotland; 258/6 (50 overs) | v | UAE; 210 (45.1 overs) |

Scotland won by 48 runs
Sharjah Cricket Stadium, Sharjah
Player of the match: Ryan Watson (Sco)

4 March
Scorecard

| Scotland; 214 (49.4 overs) | v | Canada; 178 (45.1 overs) |

Scotland won by 36 runs
Sharjah Cricket Stadium, Sharjah
Player of the match: Ian Stanger (Sco)

4 March
Scorecard

| United States; 248 (48.3 overs) | v | Netherlands; 249/2 (48.1 overs) |

Netherlands won by 8 wickets
Dubai Cricket Council Ground No 2, Dubai
Player of the match: Edgar Schiferli (Ned)

4 March
Scorecard

| Namibia; 177 (46.4 overs) | v | UAE; 107 (40 overs) |

Namibia won by 70 runs
Dubai Cricket Council Ground No 1, Dubai
Player of the match: Danie Keulder (Nam)

6 March
Scorecard

| Namibia; 195 (49.4 overs) | v | Canada; 190 (49.2 overs) |

Namibia won by 5 runs
Dubai Cricket Council Ground No 1, Dubai
Player of the match: Deon Kotze (Nam)

6 March
Scorecard

| Scotland; 206 (49.4 overs) | v | United States; 208/5 (47.2 overs) |

United States won by 5 wickets
Dubai Cricket Council Ground No 2, Dubai
Player of the match: Clayton Lambert (US)

6 March
Scorecard

| Netherlands; 290 (45.5 overs) | v | UAE; 295/7 (49.1 overs) |

UAE won by 3 wickets
Sharjah Cricket Stadium, Sharjah
Player of the match: Syed Maqsood (UAE)

== Statistics ==
=== Most runs ===
The top five run-scorers are included in this table, ranked by runs scored and then by batting average.

| Player | Team | Runs | Inns | Avg | Highest | 100s | 50s |
|---|---|---|---|---|---|---|---|
| Clayton Lambert | United States | 214 | 5 | 107.00 | 64* | 0 | 3 |
| Steve Massiah | United States | 212 | 5 | 53.00 | 92* | 0 | 2 |
| Syed Maqsood | United Arab Emirates | 204 | 5 | 40.80 | 93 | 0 | 2 |
| Gavin Hamilton | Scotland | 199 | 5 | 39.80 | 70 | 0 | 2 |
| Darron Reekers | Netherlands | 190 | 5 | 38.00 | 85 | 0 | 2 |

Source: CricketArchive

=== Most wickets ===
The top five wicket-takers are listed in this table, ranked by wickets taken and then by bowling average.

| Player | Team | Overs | Wkts | Ave | SR | Econ | BBI |
|---|---|---|---|---|---|---|---|
| John Blain | Scotland | 36.5 | 16 | 12.40 | 22.10 | 3.36 | 6/13 |
| Deon Kotze | Namibia | 47.0 | 9 | 12.11 | 31.33 | 2.31 | 3/4 |
| Sarel Burger | Namibia | 47.0 | 9 | 16.22 | 31.33 | 3.10 | 3/37 |
| Edgar Schiferli | Netherlands | 40.3 | 9 | 20.22 | 27.00 | 4.49 | 5/45 |
| Khurram Khan | United Arab Emirates | 43.3 | 9 | 21.00 | 29.00 | 4.34 | 4/35 |

Source: CricketArchive
