= 2004 ICC Americas Championship =

- Administrator: Americas Cricket Association
- Cricket format: 50 overs per side
- Tournament format: round robin
- Host: Bermuda
- Champions: Canada (2nd title)
- Participants: 6
- Matches: 15
- Most runs: (Canada) Desmond Chumney 244
- Most wickets: (Canada) Ashish Patel 15

The 2004 ICC Americas Championship was a cricket tournament in Bermuda, taking place between 6 and 16 July 2004. It gave six North and South American Associate and Affiliate members of the International Cricket Council experience of international one-day cricket.

== Teams ==
There were 6 teams that played in the tournament. These teams were non-test member nations of the Americas Cricket Association. The teams that played were:

- Argentina
- Bahamas
- Bermuda
- Canada
- Cayman Islands
- United States

== Squads ==
Argentina	Bahamas	Bermuda
Gaston Arizaga Derek Culley; Alejandro Ferguson; Pablo Ferguson; Donald Forrester; Diego Lord; Esteban MacDermott; Lucas Paterlini; Matias Paterlini; Hernan Pereyra; Pablo Ryan; Martin Siri; Malcolm van Steeden	Gary Armstrong; Whitcliff Atkinson; Venris Bennett; Garcha Blair; Gary Campbell; Randolph Coakley; Narendra Ekanayake; Andrew Ford; Mario Ford; K Seeram; Gregory Taylor; L Taylor; Dwight Weakley	Dennis Archer Glenn Blakeney; Delyone Borden; Lionel Cann; Michael Crane; Jekon Edness; Kevin Hurdle; Dwayne Leverock; Charles Marshall; Saleem Mukuddem; Steven Outerbridge; Oliver Pitcher; Clay Smith; Wendale White

Canada	Cayman Islands	United States
Ashish Bagai Ian Billcliff; A Brown; Desmond Chumney; Austin Codrington; John Davison; Nicholas de Groot; Sunil Dhaniram; Haninder Dhillon; Don Maxwell; Ashish Patel; Zubin Surkari; Zahid Hussain	Pearson Best Ryan Bovell; Omar Bryan; Lawrence Cunningham; Ronald Ebanks; Steve Gordon; Franklyn Hinds; Joseph Kirkconnell; Saheed Mohamed; Kenute Tulloch; Christopher Wight; David Wight; Michael Wight; Philip Wight	Amer Afzaluddin Aijaz Ali; Zamin Amin; Donovan Blake; Jignesh Desai; Naseer Islam; Nasir Javed; Howard Johnson; Mark Johnson; Rahul Kukreti; Clayton Lambert; Steve Massiah; Tony Reid; Richard Staple

== Group stage ==
=== Points Table ===
Pool 1
Team	P	W	L	T	NR	NRR	Points
Canada	5	5	0	0	0	+2.105	20
United States	5	4	1	0	0	+1.358	16
Bermuda	5	3	2	0	0	+0.944	12
Cayman Islands	5	2	3	0	0	-0.198	8
Argentina	5	1	4	0	0	-2.007	4
Bahamas	5	0	5	0	0	-2.233	0

=== Group stage ===
6 July
Scorecard

Canada; 260/8 (50 overs)	v	Bahamas; 98 (23 overs)
Sunil Dhaniram 46; Gary Campbell 1/20 (3 overs)		Garcha Blair 30; John Davison 3/15 (3 overs)

Canada won by 162 runs
Wellington Oval, St George's
Umpires: Malcolm Gibson (ARG) & Steve Kalloo
Player of the match: Sunil Dhaniram

- Bahamas won the toss and decided to field

6 July
Scorecard

Argentina; 182/8 (50 overs)	v	Bermuda; 183/2 (31.2 overs)
Donald Forrester 54; Dennis Archer 3/31 (10 overs)		Oliver Pitcher 98; Donald Forrester 1/36 (7 overs)

Bermuda won by 8 wickets
Somerset Cricket Club Ground
Umpires: Ashook Brijcoomar & Courtney Young
Player of the match: Oliver Pitcher

- Bermuda won the toss and decided to field

6 July
Scorecard

Cayman Islands; 138/8 (50 overs)	v	United States; 140/4 (31.4 overs)
Saheed Mohamed 41; Howard Johnson 5/12 (9 overs)		Tony Reid 42*; Franklyn Hinds 2/15 (6 overs)

USA won by 6 wickets
Bermuda National Stadium, Hamilton
Umpires: Steven Douglas & Wilbur Pitcher (BER)
Player of the match: Howard Johnson

- United States of America won the toss and decided to field

7 July
Scorecard

Canada; 294/9 (50 overs)	v	Argentina; 97 (28.3 overs)
Desmond Chumney 112; Esteban MacDermott 3/40 (9 overs)		Malcolm van Steeden 25; John Davison 3/36 (7 overs)

Canada won by 197 runs
Bermuda National Stadium, Hamilton
Umpires: Wilbur Pitcher (BER) & Courtney Young
Player of the match: Desmond Chumney

- Argentina won the toss and decided to field

7 July
Scorecard

Bahamas; 88 (25.3 overs)	v	United States; 89/1 (9.3 overs)
Garcha Blair 21; Tony Reid 3/35 (10 overs)		Mark Johnson 48*; Garcha Blair 1/27 (3 overs)

USA won by 9 wickets
Somerset Cricket Club Ground
Umpires: Roger Dill (BER) & Hubert Smythe
Player of the match: Mark Johnson

- United States of America won the toss and decided to field

7 July
Scorecard

Cayman Islands; 217/9 (50 overs)	v	Bermuda; 220/5 (49.1 overs)
Franklyn Hinds 78; Lionel Cann 3/16 (5 overs)		Glenn Blakeney 63; Michael Wight 2/29 (7.1 overs)

Bermuda won by 5 wickets
Lord's, St David's Cricket Club Ground
Umpires: Ashook Brijcoomar & Malcolm Gibson (ARG)
Player of the match: Clay Smith

- Bermuda won the toss and decided to field

8 July
Scorecard

Argentina; 99 (40.3 overs)	v	Cayman Islands; 102/2 (28.4 overs)
Lucas Paterlini 49; Saheed Mohamed 3/8 (4 overs)		Pearson Best 29*; Lucas Paterlini 1/24 (6 overs); Hernan Pereyra 1/24 (10 overs)

Cayman Islands won by 8 wickets
Southampton Oval
Umpires: Steven Douglas & George Francis
Player of the match: Lucas Paterlini

- Cayman Islands won the toss and decided to field

8 July
Scorecard

Bermuda; 267/5 (50 overs)	v	Bahamas; 96 (35.1 overs)
Wendale White 78*; Narendra Ekanayake 2/46 (8 overs)		Dwight Weakley 23; Whitcliff Atkinson 23; Dwayne Leverock 5/18 (10 overs)

Bermuda won by 171 runs
Bermuda National Stadium, Hamilton
Umpires: Steve Kalloo & Hubert Smythe
Player of the match: Dwayne Leverock

- Bahamas won the toss and decided to field

8 July
Scorecard

Canada; 224/9 (50 overs)	v	United States; 137/9 (41 overs)
Ashish Bagai 68*; Naseer Islam 3/39 (10 overs)		Mark Johnson 33; Ashish Patel 3/53 (9 overs)

Canada won by 76 runs (D/L)
Lord's, St David's Cricket Club Ground
Umpires: Roger Dill (BER) & Courtney Young
Player of the match: Ashish Bagai

- Canada won the toss and decided to bat
- Rain interrupted the United States of America innings after 36.3 overs, and 9 overs were lost. The United States' target was revised to 214 from 41 overs.

10 July
Scorecard

United States; 275 (47.4 overs)	v	Argentina; 168 (44.1 overs)
Aijaz Ali 89; Diego Lord 3/62 (8 overs)		Malcolm van Steeden 52; Zamin Amin 5/31 (10 overs)

USA won by 107 runs
Lord's, St David's Cricket Club Ground
Umpires: Ashook Brijcoomar & George Francis
Player of the match: Zamin Amin

- Argentina won the toss and decided to field

10 July
Scorecard

Bahamas; 184 (49.4 overs)	v	Cayman Islands; 188/3 (47.1 overs)
K Seeram 46*; Pearson Best 4/44 (7.4 overs)		Steve Gordon 61; Narendra Ekanayake 2/40 (10 overs)

Cayman Islands won by 7 wickets
Southampton Oval
Umpires: Steven Douglas & Malcolm Gibson (ARG)
Player of the match: Steve Gordon

- Cayman Islands won the toss and decided to field

10 July
Scorecard

Bermuda; 194/9 (50 overs)	v	Canada; 195/7 (49.1 overs)
Saleem Mukuddem 62*; Clay Smith 62; Ashish Patel 4/47 (10 overs)		Ian Billcliff 54; Dennis Archer 4/24 (7 overs)

Canada won by 3 wickets
Bermuda National Stadium, Hamilton
Umpires: Steve Kalloo & Hubert Smythe
Player of the match: Ian Billcliff

- Bermuda won the toss and decided to bat

11 July
Scorecard

Bahamas; 194 (43.2 overs)	v	Argentina; 195/6 (48.2 overs)
Dwight Weakley 39; Esteban MacDermott 3/40 (4.2 overs)		Matias Paterlini 40; Dwight Weakley 3/22 (10 overs)

Argentina won by 4 wickets
Wellington Oval, St George's
Umpires: Roger Dill & Wilbur Pitcher (both BER)
Player of the match: Matias Paterlini

- Bahamas won the toss and decided to bat

11 July
Scorecard

Bermuda; 155 (46.4 overs)	v	United States; 156/5 (44.1 overs)
Clay Smith 44; Nasir Javed 4/45 (10 overs)		Tony Reid 43*; Dwayne Leverock 3/18 (10 overs)

USA won by 5 wickets
Bermuda National Stadium, Hamilton
Umpires: Ashook Brijcoomar & Courtney Young
Player of the match: Tony Reid

- United States of America won the toss and decided to field

11 July
Scorecard

Canada; 298 (48.2 overs)	v	Cayman Islands; 231/9 (50 overs)
Zubin Surkari 52 (70); Ryan Bovell 4/57 (9.2 overs)		Saheed Mohamed 49 (55); Ashish Patel 4/50 (10 overs)

Canada won by 67 runs
Somerset Cricket Club Ground
Umpires: Steven Douglas & Steve Kalloo
Player of the match: Zubin Surkari

- Cayman Islands won the toss and decided to field

== Statistics ==
Most Runs		Most Wickets	
(Canada) Desmond Chumney	244	(Canada) Ashish Patel	15
(Bermuda) Clay Smith	190	(Bermuda) Dennis Archer	11
(Canada) Ian Billcliff	153	(Canada) John Davison	11
(Canada) John Davison	150	(United States) Zamin Amin	10
(Canada) Zubin Surkari	145	(United States) Howard Johnson	10
