= List of Champions Trophy five-wicket hauls =

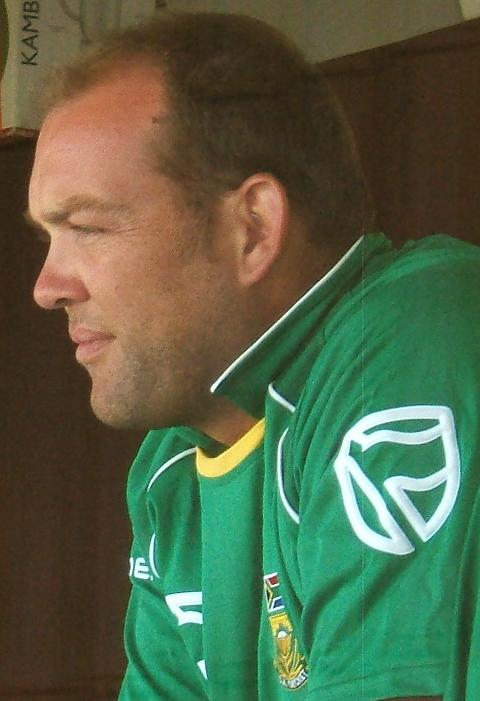
South Africa's Jacques Kallis was the first player to take a five-wicket haul in ICC Champions Trophy.

In cricket, a five-wicket haul (also known as a "five–for" or "fifer") refers to a bowler taking five or more wickets in a single innings. This is regarded as a significant achievement, and there have been only 15 instances of a bowler taking a fifer in ICC Champions Trophy tournaments. The ICC Champions Trophy is a One Day International (ODI) tournament organised by the International Cricket Council (ICC), and is considered the second most significant cricket tournament after the World Cup. Originally inaugurated as the "ICC Knock Out Trophy" in 1998, the tournament has been organised every two or three years since.

As 2 March 2025, 15 players from 8 different nations have taken fifers. South Africa's Jacques Kallis was the first to take a five-wicket haul in the tournament, while playing against the West Indies in the final of the inaugural edition. His bowling figures of 5 wickets for 30 runs in the final helped South Africa win the tournament. The figures also secured a place in the "Top 100 bowling performances of all-time", a list released by the Wisden Cricketers' Almanack in 2002. The Indians, New Zealanders and the South Africans, have taken the most fifers with three each, followed by the Australians with two. Afghanistan, Pakistan, Sri Lanka and the West Indies each have one. Sri Lanka's Farveez Maharoof holds the record for the best bowling figures: 6 wickets for 14 runs – also his career best figures – against the West Indies in the 2006 tournament. The 2025 edition saw four five-wicket hauls, the highest for a single tournament.

== Key ==
Key
| Symbol | Meaning |
|---|---|
| Bowler | The bowler who took the five-wicket haul |
| Date | The date when the match was played |
| Team | The cricket team the bowler was representing |
| Opposition | The team the bowler was playing against |
| Inn | Innings in which the score was made |
| Overs | Number of overs bowled |
| Runs | Number of runs conceded |
| Wkts | Number of wickets taken |
| Econ | Economy rate (number of runs conceded per over) |
| Batsmen | Batsmen whose wickets were taken |
| Result | Result for the team for which the five-wicket haul was taken |

== Five-wicket hauls ==
ICC Champions Trophy five-wicket hauls
| No. | Bowler | Date | Team | Opposition | Venue | Inn | Overs | Runs | Wkts | Econ | Batsmen | Result | Ref |
|---|---|---|---|---|---|---|---|---|---|---|---|---|---|
| 1 | Jacques Kallis | 1 November 1998 | South Africa | West Indies | Bangabandhu National Stadium, Dhaka | 1 | 7.3 | 30 | 5 | 4.00 | Carl Hooper; Keith Arthurton; Phil Simmons; Rawl Lewis; Reon King | Won | |
| 2 | Shayne O'Connor | 11 October 2000 | New Zealand | Pakistan | Gymkhana Club Ground, Nairobi | 1 | 9.2 | 46 | 5 | 4.92 | Imran Nazir; Abdul Razzaq; Wasim Akram; Azhar Mahmood; Saqlain Mushtaq | Won | |
| 3 | Glenn McGrath | 15 September 2002 | Australia | New Zealand | Sinhalese Sports Club Ground, Colombo | 2 | 7 | 37 | 5 | 5.28 | Stephen Fleming; Mathew Sinclair; Lou Vincent; Scott Styris; Jacob Oram | Won | |
| 4 | Jacob Oram | 10 September 2004 | New Zealand | United States | The Oval, London | 2 | 9.4 | 36 | 5 | 3.72 | Rohan Alexander; Mark Johnson; Leon Romero; Steve Massiah; Rashid Zia | Won | |
| 5 | Shahid Afridi | 14 September 2004 | Pakistan | Kenya | Edgbaston, Birmingham | 1 | 6 | 11 | 5 | 1.83 | Morris Ouma; Thomas Odoyo; Brijal Patel; Malhar Patel; Peter Ongondo | Won | |
| 6 | Mervyn Dillon | 15 September 2004 | West Indies | Bangladesh | Rose Bowl, Southampton | 2 | 10 | 29 | 5 | 2.90 | Javed Omar; Nafees Iqbal; Rajin Saleh; Khaled Mashud; Mohammad Rafique | Won | |
| 7 | Farveez Maharoof | 14 October 2006 | Sri Lanka | West Indies | Brabourne Stadium, Mumbai | 1 | 9 | 14 | 6 | 1.55 | Brian Lara; Wavell Hinds; Dwayne Bravo; Marlon Samuels; Dwayne Smith; Carlton Baugh | Won | |
| 8 | Makhaya Ntini | 27 October 2006 | South Africa | Pakistan | Inderjit Singh Bindra Stadium, Mohali | 2 | 6 | 21 | 5 | 3.5 | Mohammad Hafeez; Imran Farhat; Younis Khan; Shoaib Malik; Kamran Akmal | Won | |
| 9 | Wayne Parnell | 24 September 2009 | South Africa | New Zealand | SuperSport Park, Centurion | 1 | 8 | 57 | 5 | 7.12 | Jesse Ryder; Martin Guptill; Ross Taylor; Gareth Hopkins; Daryl Tuffey | Won | |
| 10 | Ravindra Jadeja | 11 June 2013 | India | West Indies | The Oval, London | 1 | 10 | 36 | 5 | 3.60 | Johnson Charles; Marlon Samuels; Ramnaresh Sarwan; Sunil Narine; Ravi Rampaul | Won | |
| 11 | Josh Hazlewood | 2 June 2017 | Australia | New Zealand | Edgbaston, Birmingham | 1 | 9 | 52 | 6 | 5.77 | Martin Guptill; Neil Broom; James Neesham; Adam Milne; Mitchell Santner; Trent Boult | No result | |
| 12 | Mohammed Shami | 20 February 2025 | India | Bangladesh | Dubai International Cricket Stadium, Dubai | 1 | 10 | 53 | 5 | 5.30 | Soumya Sarkar; Mehidy Hasan Miraz; Jaker Ali; Tanzim Hasan Sakib; Taskin Ahmed | Won | |
| 13 | Azmatullah Omarzai | 26 February 2025 | Afghanistan | England | Gaddafi Stadium, Lahore | 2 | 9.5 | 58 | 5 | 5.89 | Phil Salt; Jos Buttler; Joe Root; Jamie Overton; Adil Rashid | Won | |
| 14 | Matt Henry | 2 March 2025 | New Zealand | India | Dubai International Cricket Stadium, Dubai | 1 | 8 | 42 | 5 | 5.25 | Shubman Gill; Virat Kohli; Ravindra Jadeja; Hardik Pandya; Mohammed Shami | Lost | |
| 15 | Varun Chakravarthy | 2 March 2025 | India | New Zealand | Dubai International Cricket Stadium, Dubai | 2 | 10 | 42 | 5 | 4.20 | Will Young; Glenn Phillips; Michael Bracewell; Mitchell Santner; Matt Henry | Won | |

== Bibliography ==
- Pervez, M.A. (2001). A Dictionary of Cricket. Universities Press. ISBN 978-81-7370-184-9.
- Stern, John; Williams, Marcus (2014). The Essential Wisden: An Anthology of 150 Years of Wisden Cricketers' Almanack. A & C Black. ISBN 978-1-4081-7896-6.
