= Zamin Amin =

Guyanese-born American cricketer

Personal information
- Full name: Zamin Ally Amin
- Born: 4 April 1963 (age 63); British Guiana
- Batting: Right-handed
- Bowling: Left-arm orthodox

International information
- National side: United States (1990–2004)
- Source: CricketArchive, 2 February 2016

Zamin Ally Amin (born 4 April 1963) is a former American cricketer of Guyanese origin. A left-arm orthodox bowler, he played for the American national side from 1990 to 2004.

Amin hails from Chesney, in Guyana's East Berbice-Corentyne region, and played for the Guyana under-19s before emigrating to the United States. He made his senior debut for the U.S. national team at the 1990 ICC Trophy in the Netherlands, and took 13 wickets from seven games to finish as the team's leading wicket-taker (and fifth overall). His best figures of the tournament, 4/29 from ten overs, came against Gibraltar. Amin was also the leading wicket-taker for the U.S. at the 1994 ICC Trophy, taking 11 wickets from seven matches (including 5/20 against Israel). He came close to repeating the feat at the tournament's 1997 edition, with only Derek Kallicharran taking more wickets among his teammates.

In October 1998, Amin played for the U.S. in the 1998–99 Red Stripe Bowl, the West Indian domestic one-day competition. He had little opportunity to bowl in his two matches, and went wicketless. Amin's next major international tournament was the 2000 Americas Cricket Cup in Canada. After that, he did not return to the national team until March 2004, when he represented the U.S. in the ICC Six Nations Challenge in the United Arab Emirates. Later in the year, in May, Amin was selected to make his first-class debut, playing against Canada in the newly established ICC Intercontinental Cup. He was 43 years old at the time of his debut, and took two wickets in each innings. Despite his age, Amin was his team's equal leading wicket-taker at the 2004 ICC Americas Championship in Bermuda, with his best figures being 5/31 against Argentina. After the conclusion of the championship, the U.S. played an Intercontinental Cup fixture against Bermuda, which was Amin's last international appearance.

In February 2020, he was named in the West Indies' squad for the Over-50s Cricket World Cup in South Africa. However, the tournament was cancelled during the third round of matches due to the COVID-19 pandemic.
