= Garcha =

Garcha may refer to:

- Garcha, Azerbaijan, village in Azerbaijan
- Garcha, SBS Nagar, village in India

== People with the name ==
- Garcha Blair (born 1976), Bahamian cricketer
- Kuldeep Singh Garcha (born 1943), Indian polo player and soldier
- Harjinder Singh Garcha (born 1982), British Indian musician also known as Jindi G
