= Ben Goedegebuur =

Dutch cricketer

Personal information
- Full name: Ben D. Goedegebuur
- Born: 29 May 1979 (age 47); Netherlands
- Batting: Right-handed
- Bowling: Right-arm fast-medium

Domestic team information
- Years: Team
- 2000: Netherlands

Career statistics
Competition	List A
Matches	4
Runs scored	11
Batting average	11.00
100s/50s	–/–
Top score	11*
Balls bowled	198
Wickets	4
Bowling average	45.25
5 wickets in innings	–
10 wickets in match	–
Best bowling	2/31
Catches/stumpings	2/–
- Source: Cricinfo, 8 February 2022

Ben D. Goedegebuur (born 29 May 1979) is a Dutch former cricketer.

Goedegebuur was born in the Netherlands in May 1979. As a 17–year old, Goedegebuur toured England with the Dutch Colts in 1996. In 2000, he was a member of the Netherlands side which won the 2000 European Cricket Championship, a competition played between European Associate and Affiliate members of the International Cricket Council. He was selected in the Dutch squad for the 2000 ICC Emerging Nations Tournament, making his debut in List A one-day cricket during the tournament against Denmark, with him going onto make a further two appearances against Zimbabwe A and Scotland. He made a fourth List A appearance for the Netherlands against Lincolnshire in the 2nd round of the 2000 NatWest Trophy, an English domestic one-day tournament the Netherlands were invited to take part in. In his four List A matches, he scored 11 runs and took 4 wickets, with best bowling figures of 2 for 31. He played his club cricket in the Netherlands for VOC (1994–2011). Following his cricket career, Goedegebuur began a career in advertising.
