= Time of the Wolf (2002 film) =

2002 film

- Directed by: Rod Pridy
- Written by: Don French
- Produced by: Paco Alvarez; Frank Hübner
- Starring: Burt Reynolds; Marthe Keller; Devin Douglas Drewitz; Jason Priestley
- Cinematography: Norayr Kasper
- Edited by: Jeff Warren
- Music by: John Scott
- Distributed by: Madacy Entertainment
- Release date: 2002
- Running time: 87 minutes
- Countries: Germany; Canada
- Language: English

Time of the Wolf, also released as The Boy from Wolf Mountain, is a 2002 drama film directed by Rod Pridy and starring Burt Reynolds, Marthe Keller and Devin Douglas Drewitz. The plot concerns an orphan boy who goes to live with his only surviving relatives. It was filmed in Point Pelee National Park and Toronto, Ontario, Canada.

== Plot ==
When Aaron loses his parents, the only family he has left are his estranged aunt and uncle, who are reluctant to take the young boy in. But with no other options, Aaron moves into their farm house, nestled in the sprawling wilderness, and begins a new life. Aaron finds much comfort in exploring the nature around him and becomes even more intrigued when he spots a white wolf patrolling the nearby bridge. When he witnesses a wound on the majestic animal, Aaron reaches out to the wolf and creates a bond that will become very important to protecting both of their lives.

== Cast ==
- Burt Reynolds as Archie McGregor
- Marthe Keller as Rebecca McGregor
- Devin Douglas Drewitz as Aaron
- Jason Priestley as Mr. Nelson
- John Neville as Preacher
- Jamie Kerr as Josh Grossler
- Steven Taylor as Freddy McGuire
- Charlotte Arnold as Paige McGuire
- Anthony Lemke as Alex McKenzie

== Note ==
The film is unrelated to the French suspense drama Le Temps du Loup starring Isabelle Huppert and released in America as Time of the Wolf the following year.
