= List of United States ODI cricketers =

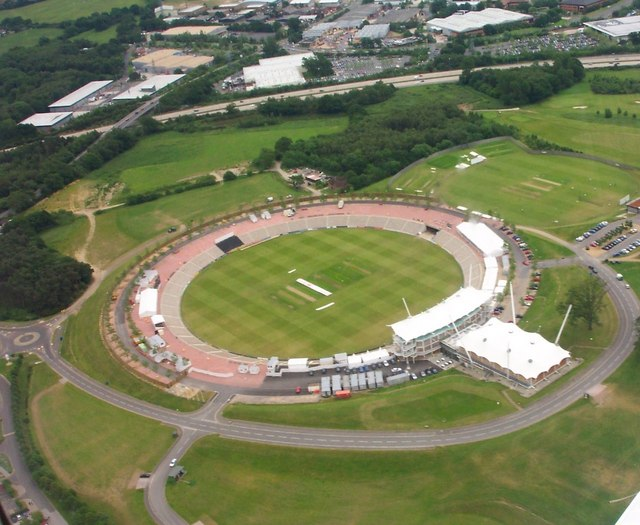
The Rose Bowl is where the United States played its second ODI.

A One Day International (ODI) is a cricket match between two representative teams, each having ODI status, as determined by the International Cricket Council (ICC). (Note: The ICC has changed the definition as to what constitutes a representative side that has ODI status several times. The following definition came into force on 20 February 2019 (following Ireland and Afghanistan's promotion to Full Member Status): 1. Any teams participating in the ICC Cricket World Cup or Asia Cup; 2. Full Members of the International Cricket Council (ICC); 3. The top 4 Associate Members of the ICC; 4. A composite team selected by the ICC as representative of the best players from the rest of the world.; In addition, the ICC decided to award ODI status to the top four nations in the 2019 ICC World Cricket League Division Two, who would also qualify for the 2019–21 ICC Cricket World Cup League 2. Therefore, all countries who qualified for this tournament will get ODI status. This took the total number of sides with ODI status up to 20. Definition before Ireland and Afghanistan's promotion: 1. Any teams participating in the ICC Cricket World Cup or ICC Champions Trophy; 2. Full Members of the International Cricket Council (ICC); 3. The top 6 Associate and Affiliate Members of the ICC; 4. A composite team selected by the ICC as representative of the best players from the rest of the world.) The United States (U.S.) played its first ODI under the captaincy of Richard Staple at the Kennington Oval, London on September 10, 2004, against New Zealand in 2004 ICC Champions Trophy. The U.S. played a total of two matches during this tournament and lost both, failing to qualify for the semifinals. The U.S. gained ODI status 15 years later after finishing in the top four of the 2019 ICC World Cricket League Division Two, thus securing a place in the 2019–21 ICC Cricket World Cup League 2. (Note: U.S. failed to qualify for the 2007 Cricket World Cup after finishing outside of the top five of the 2005 ICC Trophy. As a consequence of this, U.S. failed to qualify for Division One of the World Cricket League (WCL), thus losing ODI status. In 2018, the ICC restructured the qualification pathway for the World Cup, and in the process disbanded the World Cricket League. In its place, three new tournaments were created: 2020–22 ICC Cricket World Cup Super League, 2019–21 ICC Cricket World Cup League 2, 2019–21 ICC Cricket World Cup Challenge League. Matches in the Super League and League 2 were automatically granted ODI status by the ICC. As the U.S. qualified for League 2, they have been granted ODI status till 2022 World cup.)

As of early January 2026, 51 players have represented the United States in ODI matches.

== Key ==
General

- ‡ – Captain
- † – Wicket-keeper
- First – Year of debut
- Last – Year of latest game
- Mat – Number of matches played

Fielding

- Ca – Catches taken
- St – Stumpings taken

Batting

- Runs – Runs scored in career
- HS – Highest score
- Avg – Runs scored per dismissal
- * – Batsman remained not out
- 100 – Number of centuries scored
- 50 – Number of half centuries scored

Bowling

- Balls – Balls bowled in career
- Wkt – Wickets taken in career
- BBI – Best bowling in an innings
- Ave – Average runs conceded per wicket
- 5WI – Five wickets or more in a match

== Player list ==
Statistics are correct as of November 3, 2025.

United States ODI cricketers
General					Batting					Bowling					Fielding		Ref
No.	Name	First	Last	Mat	Runs	HS	Avg	50	100	Balls	Wkt	BBI	Ave	5WI	Ca	St	Ref
1	Aijaz Ali	2004	2004	2	5	4	2.50	0	0	–	–	–	–	–	1	0	
2	Rohan Alexander	2004	2004	2	34	26	17.00	0	0	–	–	–	–	–	0	0	
3	Jignesh Desai	2004	2004	1	16	16	16.00	0	0	–	–	–	–	–	1	0	
4	Howard Johnson	2004	2004	2	9	9	9.00	0	0	60	1	1/26	69.00	0	0	0	
5	Mark Johnson†	2004	2004	2	20	20	10.00	0	0	–	–	–	–	–	1	0	
6	Clayton Lambert (Note: Clayton Lambert has also played 11 One Day Internationals for West Indies, before playing for the United States. Only his record for United States is given above.)	2004	2004	1	39	39	39.00	0	0	60	0	–	–	0	0	0	
7	Steve Massiah	2004	2004	2	23	23	11.50	0	0	–	–	–	–	–	0	0	
8	Rashid Zia	2004	2004	2	9	8	4.50	0	0	59	0	–	–	0	0	0	
9	Tony Reid	2004	2004	2	8	6	4.00	0	0	78	1	1/37	63.00	0	0	0	
10	Leon Romero	2004	2004	2	1	1	0.50	0	0	24	1	1/52	52.00	0	1	0	
11	Richard Staple‡	2004	2004	2	4	4	2.00	0	0	60	2	2/76	38.00	0	0	0	
12	Donovan Blake	2004	2004	1	0	0	0.00	0	0	6	0	–	–	0	0	0	
13	Nasir Javed	2004	2004	1	2	2*	–	0	0	–	–	–	–	–	0	0	
14	Aaron Jones	2019	2025	52	1,664	123*	33.95	11	1	197	0	–	–	0	17	0	
15	Ali Khan	2019	2023	15	20	6	3.33	0	0	681	33	7/32	16.42	2	2	0	
16	Karima Gore	2019	2021	16	210	44	16.15	0	0	552	13	4/20	31.23	0	6	0	
17	Jessy Singh	2019	2025	45	304	38	12.66	0	0	2,002	54	4/18	34.42	0	11	0	
18	Jaskaran Malhotra†	2019	2022	18	429	173*	30.64	1	1	102	2	1/17	33.50	0	10	1	
19	Xavier Marshall (Note: Xavier Marshall has also played 24 One Day Internationals for West Indies, before playing for the United States. Only his record for United States is given above.)	2019	2020	13	221	50	17.00	1	0	–	–	–	–	–	3	0	
20	Saurabh Netravalkar‡	2019	2025	67	150	19*	9.37	0	0	3,445	108	5/32	21.23	2	17	0	
21	Monank Patel‡†	2019	2025	71	2,288	130	34.66	18	3	–	–	–	–	–	41	2	
22	Timil Patel	2019	2020	7	72	50*	18.00	1	0	234	6	2/25	25.00	0	2	0	
23	Steven Taylor	2019	2024	49	1,265	114	25.81	7	1	1,598	40	4/23	30.02	0	20	0	
24	Hayden Walsh Jr. (Note: Hayden Walsh Jr. has also played One Day Internationals for West Indies, after playing for the United States. Only his record for United States is given above.)	2019	2019	1	27	27	27.00	0	0	6	0	–	0	0	0	0	
25	Elmore Hutchinson	2019	2021	11	142	49*	23.66	0	0	312	4	1/12	56.50	0	4	0	
26	Nisarg Patel	2019	2023	41	496	52	17.71	1	0	1,615	42	4/30	30.50	0	7	0	
27	Rusty Theron (Note: Rusty Theron has also played 4 One Day Internationals for South Africa, before playing for the United States. Only his record for United States is given above.)	2019	2022	14	45	12	5.00	0	0	586	19	4/56	26.00	0	3	0	
28	Nosthush Kenjige	2019	2025	61	413	43	17.20	0	0	2,971	69	5/11	30.36	1	28	0	
29	Akshay Homraj†	2019	2020	8	159	44	19.87	0	0	–	–	–	–	–	12	0	
30	Ian Holland	2019	2022	15	368	75	26.28	2	0	628	19	3/11	24.52	0	6	0	
31	Cameron Stevenson	2019	2022	18	141	34*	10.84	0	0	693	23	3/22	27.91	0	3	0	
32	Sushant Modani	2021	2024	34	900	111	26.47	6	1	12	0	–	0	0	3	0	
33	Gajanand Singh	2021	2023	32	986	101*	36.51	6	1	113	6	4/15	15.83	0	14	0	
34	Abhishek Paradkar	2021	2024	6	51	24	12.75	0	0	222	9	4/26	26.88	0	1	0	
35	Sanjay Krishnamurthi	2021	2025	16	270	61	22.50	1	0	106	4	3/10	17.50	0	10	0	
36	Dominique Rikhi	2021	2021	2	3	3	1.50	0	0	–	–	–	–	–	1	0	
37	Kyle Phillip	2021	2023	5	1	1	0.50	0	0	243	6	3/43	40.83	0	1	0	
38	Saiteja Mukkamalla	2022	2025	37	1,255	137*	39.21	7	3	–	–	–	–	–	13	0	
39	Rahul Jariwala	2022	2022	4	30	14	7.50	0	0	–	–	–	–	–	0	0	
40	Yasir Mohammad	2022	2025	7	5	3	2.50	0	0	252	7	2/10	34.57	0	1	0	
41	Shayan Jahangir†	2022	2025	32	795	104	33.12	3	2	–	–	–	–	–	21	1	
42	Usman Rafiq	2023	2023	2	28	28*	28.00	0	0	32	0	–	–	0	0	0	
43	Harmeet Singh	2024	2025	22	325	59	25.00	2	0	1,135	31	6/27	24.25	1	7	0	
44	Milind Kumar	2024	2025	22	1,016	155*	67.73	7	3	732	28	5/66	18.64	0	11	0	
45	Smit Patel†	2024	2025	20	655	152*	36.38	3	1	–	–	–	–	–	26	3	
46	Shadley van Schalkwyk	2024	2025	13	167	58	20.87	1	0	552	17	4/20	32.35	0	6	0	
47	Juanoy Drysdale	2024	2024	4	2	2*	–	0	0	132	4	2/16	25.25	0	0	0	
48	Andries Gous	2024	2025	14	405	83	31.15	4	0	–	–	–	–	–	3	0	
49	Utkarsh Srivastava	2024	2024	2	75	67	37.50	1	0	24	0	–	–	0	0	0	
50	Shubham Ranjane	2025	2025	4	84	46*	42.00	0	0	168	6	2/32	24.00	0	1	0	
51	Rushil Ugarkar	2025	2025	3	–	–	–	–	–	115	7	5/22	11.85	1	1	0	
52	Shehan Jayasuriya	2026	2026	2	59	50	–	–	–	–	–	–	–	0	0	0	

== See also ==
- List of United States Twenty20 International cricketers
