= Mohammad Afzal (Emirati cricketer) =

Pakistani cricketer (born 1973)

Mohammad Afzal Anwar
Personal information
- Full name: Mohammad Afzal Anwar
- Born: 20 November 1973 (age 52); Lahore, Pakistan
- Batting: Left-handed
- Bowling: Left-arm orthodox

International information
- National side: United Arab Emirates (2000–2004)

Domestic team information
- Years: Team
- 1989–1993: Lahore City (Pakistan)
- Source: CricketArchive, 11 March 2016

Mohammad Afzal Anwar (born 20 November 1973), known as Mohammad Afzal, is a former Pakistani-born international cricketer who represented the United Arab Emirates national team between 2000 and 2004. He was born in Pakistan, and played at high levels there before relocating to the UAE.

Afzal was born in Lahore, Pakistan. A left-arm orthodox bowler and left-handed batsman, he made his senior debut for Lahore City at the age of 15, playing a Wills Cup match against the National Bank of Pakistan in September 1989. Afzal did not re-appear for over two years, returning during the 1991–92 season. He made his first-class debut for Lahore City in November 1991, in a Quaid-i-Azam Trophy game against Sargodha. In January 1992, Afzal toured England with the Pakistan under-19s, playing three Tests and three ODIs against the England under-19s. In the first ODI, he top-scored for Pakistan with 84 runs, made from sixth in the batting order.

Afzal's last match for Lahore City came in October 1993, in a Wills Cup fixture against the Karachi Blues. In total, he played six first-class and six List A matches in Pakistan, all for Lahore City. After relocating to the UAE, Afzal debuted for the national team at the 2000 ACC Trophy, which the UAE hosted. He played only a single match, taking 0/20 and scoring 16 not out against Nepal. In 2003, Afzal appeared for an Emirates Cricket Board select team in a series against Pakistan A, scoring 54 in one match. His second and final international tournament for the UAE was the 2004 ICC Six Nations Challenge, where matches held List A status. He played two matches, against Scotland and the Netherlands, but was wicketless in both, and was dismissed for a duck in his only innings.
