= Ian Khan (cricketer) =

Canadian cricketer

Personal information
- Full name: Ian Ronald Khan
- Born: 1 July 1976 (age 50); Scarborough, Ontario, Canada
- Batting: Right-handed
- Bowling: Right-arm medium-fast

International information
- National side: Canada (2004)
- Source: CricketArchive, 11 March 2016

Ian Ronald Khan (born 1 July 1976) is a Canadian former international cricketer who represented the Canadian national team at the 2004 ICC Six Nations Challenge. He played as a right-arm pace bowler.

A former Canada under-19s player, Khan was selected in Canada's initial 38-man training squad for the 2003 World Cup, but did not make the final squad of 15. In 2004, he was selected in Canada's squad for the Six Nations Challenge in the United Arab Emirates, where matches held List A status. Khan played in three of his team's five matches, but had little impact, bowling only 5.3 overs in total. His only wicket came against the United Arab Emirates, where he finished with 1/27 from 2.3 overs.
