= Garcha Blair =

Bahamian cricketer (born 1976)

Personal information
- Full name: Garcha Orlando Blair
- Born: 20 January 1976 (age 50); Bahamas
- Batting: Right-handed
- Bowling: Left-arm fast-medium

International information
- National side: Bahamas

Career statistics
Competition	T20
Matches	2
Runs scored	5
Batting average	5.00
100s/50s	–/–
Top score	5*
Balls bowled	42
Wickets	3
Bowling average	24.66
5 wickets in innings	–
10 wickets in match	–
Best bowling	2/39
Catches/stumpings	1/–
- Source: Cricinfo, 28 May 2010

Garcha Orlando Blair (born 20 January 1976) is a Bahamian cricketer. Blair is a right-handed batsman who bowls left-arm fast-medium and who represents the Bahamas national cricket team.

Blair made his debut for the Bahamas in the 2002 ICC Americas Championship against the United States.

Blair made his Twenty20 debut for the Bahamas against the Cayman Islands in the 1st round of the 2006 Stanford 20/20 and played his second and final Twenty20 match for the Bahamas in the 1st round of the 2008 Stanford 20/20 against Jamaica In his two Twenty20 matches, he scored 5 runs and took 3 wickets at a bowling average of 24.66.
