= Ashish Patel =

Canadian cricketer

Personal information
- Born: 31 July 1975 (age 51); Gujarat, India
- Batting: Right-handed
- Bowling: Right-arm medium

Career statistics
Competition	ODI	First-class
Matches	2	3
Runs scored	25	46
Batting average	25.00	46.00
100s/50s	0/0	0/0
Top score	25	25*
Balls bowled	60	217
Wickets	3	5
Bowling average	24.33	20.60
5 wickets in innings	0	0
10 wickets in match	0	0
Best bowling	3/41	3/13
Catches/stumpings	0/–	0/–
- Source: Cricket Archive (subscription required)

Ashish Patel (born July 31, 1975) is a Canadian cricketer. A medium-pacer, he took his place in the team given the absence of several players for the 2002 ICC Americas Championship, followed by a strong performance in the 2002 ICC Six Nations Challenge in Namibia.

He participated in the 2003 Cricket World Cup, and made an impressive debut in which he disposed of South Africans Herschelle Gibbs and Jacques Kallis. He took more wickets than any other bowler in the 2004 ICC Six Nations Challenge. He has not played for Canada since the final of the 2004 ICC Intercontinental Cup.
