= Tony Reid =

Barbadian-born American cricketer

Personal information
- Full name: Charles Anthony Reid
- Born: 9 April 1962 (age 64); Barbados
- Batting: Right-handed
- Bowling: Right-arm medium
- Role: All rounder

International information
- National side: United States
- ODI debut (cap 8): 10 September 2004 v New Zealand
- Last ODI: 13 September 2004 v Australia

Career statistics
Competition	ODI	FC	LA
Matches	2	2	15
Runs scored	8	33	276
Batting average	4.00	8.25	21.23
100s/50s	0/0	0/0	0/3
Top score	6	26	61*
Balls bowled	78	156	714
Wickets	1	4	9
Bowling average	63.00	19.00	50.22
5 wickets in innings	0	0	0
10 wickets in match	0	0	0
Best bowling	1/37	2/10	3/40
Catches/stumpings	0/0	1/0	2/0
- Source: CricketArchive, 16 October 2008

Charles Anthony "Tony" Reid (born 9 April 1962) is a Barbados-born American former cricketer. A right-handed batsman and right-arm medium pace bowler, he played for the United States national cricket team from 2000 until 2005. He was the first man to take a wicket for the US in a One Day International (ODI).

== Biography ==
Born in Barbados in 1962, Reid made his List A debut when the USA took part in the 2000–01 Red Stripe Bowl, playing three of the team's four group matches in Jamaica. His debut against the Jamaicans was inauspicious as he went for 50 from his ten overs and was lbw to Laurie Williams for a duck.

He did not play in the match against Canada, but was back in the side against his native Barbados, taking his first senior wicket - that of West Indies Test batsman Adrian Griffith. He was retained against Trinidad & Tobago, but failed to make any impression as the USA were bowled out for a paltry 62, which their opponents rushed past for the loss of one wicket in 31 balls.

His next appearances were in early 2004, at the ICC 6 Nations Challenge tournament in Sharjah and Dubai which the United States eventually won on net run rate. In the first match, against Namibia, he took 3-40 and scored 30 in a five-wicket win, as well as running out the Namibian captain, Deon Kotze. Later in the competition he scored 55 in a losing cause against the Netherlands.

Shortly after the end of the Six Nations competition, Reid made his first-class debut at the 2004 ICC Intercontinental Cup against Canada in Fort Lauderdale. He scored only 4 and 2 as the USA lost by 104 runs, but took 2–10 in six tight overs in the Canadian second innings. Five games followed at the Americas Championship, a tournament he previously played in 2000, before another Intercontinental Cup appearance, this time in a winning cause against Bermuda.

In September 2004, the USA played the first ODIs in their history, in the 2004 ICC Champions Trophy in England. Reid had been caught up in Hurricane Frances, and at one stage had looked unlikely to make it across the Atlantic, but he was rewarded for his perseverance when, opening the bowling in the first game against New Zealand, he had captain Stephen Fleming caught at cover.

This was the first wicket in ODI history for the United States, although they were brought back down to earth by a thumping 210-run defeat, followed by a nine-wicket thrashing by the Australians.

Reid last played for the US in the 2005 ICC Trophy in Ireland, but despite two half centuries his bowling was ineffective, and he took just one wicket from 42 overs in a disastrous competition for the Americans which saw them lose all four of their group games (one more was abandoned), thus denying the USA a place at the 2007 World Cup. He hit 54 against Denmark, but his best of 61 not out came in a ninth-place play-off match which saw the United States beaten by Oman.
