= Jamie Kerr =

Scottish cricketer

Personal information
- Full name: James Alexander McKenzie Kerr
- Born: 12 June 1975 (age 51); Edinburgh, Scotland
- Batting: Right-handed
- Bowling: Right-arm
- Role: Wicket-keeper

International information
- National side: Scotland (2004)
- Source: CricketArchive, 11 March 2016

James Alexander McKenzie "Jamie" Kerr (born 12 June 1975) is a former Scottish international cricketer who represented the Scottish national team at the 2004 ICC Six Nations Challenge. He played as wicket-keeper.

Kerr was born in Edinburgh, and played his club cricket for the Carlton Cricket Club. He played for the Scotland under-19s in 1993 and 1994. In 2004, Kerr was selected as Scotland's back-up wicket-keeper for the 2004 ICC Six Nations Challenge in the United Arab Emirates, where matches held List A status. He played in only a single match, against Canada, with regular keeper Douglas Lockhart playing solely as a batsman. Kerr never played another senior game for Scotland, but in 2008 made two appearances for Scotland A in the Second XI Championship.
