= Rahul Kukreti =

American cricketer (1976–2019)

Personal information
- Born: August 2, 1976; Chandigarh, India
- Died: August 12, 2019 (aged 43); Dallas, Texas, United States
- Source: Cricinfo, 17 January 2020

Rahul Kukreti (August 2, 1976 – August 12, 2019) was an American cricketer. He played in three matches for the United States cricket team in the 2008 ICC World Cricket League Division Five tournament in Jersey. Kukreti died from a rare form of cancer, undifferentiated chondrosarcoma.
