= Qərchə =

- Location within Azerbaijan
- Coordinates: 40°50′56″N 48°23′04″E
- Country: Azerbaijan
- Rayon: Ismailli
- Time zone: UTC+4 (AZT)
  - Summer (DST): UTC+5 (AZT)

Qərchə (also, Garcha, Karcha, and Kerche) is a village in the Ismailli Rayon of Azerbaijan.
