= Ryan Hinds =

West Indian cricketer

Personal information
- Full name: Ryan O'Neal Hinds
- Born: 17 February 1981 (age 45); Holders Hill, St James, Barbados
- Batting: Left-handed
- Bowling: Slow left-arm orthodox

International information
- National side: West Indies (2001-2009)
- Test debut: 31 January 2002 v Pakistan
- Last Test: 17 July 2009 v Bangladesh
- ODI debut: 16 December 2001 v Zimbabwe
- Last ODI: 25 September 2004 v England

Career statistics
Competition	Test	ODI	FC	LA
Matches	15	14	121	109
Runs scored	505	101	6,828	2,230
Batting average	21.04	16.83	38.14	28.22
100s/50s	0/2	0/0	12/35	0/12
Top score	84	18*	240	84
Balls bowled	1,743	407	14,934	4,337
Wickets	13	6	233	107
Bowling average	66.92	58.33	26.94	27.06
5 wickets in innings	0	0	5	1
10 wickets in match	0	0	1	0
Best bowling	2/45	2/19	9/68	6/46
Catches/stumpings	7/–	2/–	94/–	39/–
Medal record
Men's Cricket
Representing West Indies
ICC Champions Trophy
Winner	2004 England
- Source: CricketArchive, 13 February 2017

Ryan O'Neal Hinds (born 17 February 1981) is a West Indian cricketer. He is a left-handed batsman and a slow left-arm orthodox bowler. Hinds was a member of the West Indies team that won the 2004 ICC Champions Trophy.

Hinds made his début for Barbados during the 1998 Commonwealth Games, aged just 17. He then captained the West Indian Under-19 side during the 2000 Youth World Cup.

While still a twenty-year-old, he set a bowling record for Barbados by taking 15 wickets in a match against the Leeward Islands during the 2001 Busta Cup. His first innings figures of 9 for 68 were also a Barbadian record. He went into the record books again in a game against the Leeward Islands in 2005–6 when he scored a century in both innings (168 and 150), becoming the first player for Barbados to do so.

His Test début came against Pakistan at Sharjah in 2001–2 during which he scored a half-century.

In February 2007, while captain of Barbados, Hinds showed dissent to an umpiring decision during a bad-tempered regional game against Trinidad and Tobago. He escaped a ban, for actions that WICB director Deryck Murray described as the worst behaviour he'd seen in a regional match, because the match report was submitted too late. This, along with other instances of indiscipline, prompted his removal from the captaincy, subsequent to which he announced his unavailability for the regional limited-overs championship. It was revealed that Hinds is "mentally exhausted" and that he has sought treatment.

In 2012, he was accused of raping a 28-year-old woman and was arrested and released on bail.
