= Desmond Chumney =

Canadian cricketer (born 1968)

Personal information
- Full name: Desmond Randolph Chumney
- Born: 8 January 1968 (age 58); Saint Kitts
- Batting: Right-handed
- Bowling: Right-arm offbreak
- Role: Batsman

International information
- National side: Canada (2003-2007)
- ODI debut (cap 16): 11 February 2003 v Bangladesh
- Last ODI: 18 March 2007 v England

Career statistics
Competition	ODI	FC	LA	ICC T
Matches	21	3	43	17
Runs scored	397	108	830	402
Batting average	20.89	18.00	20.24	23.64
100s/50s	0/0	0/0	0/3	0/3
Top score	48	33	64	64
Catches/stumpings	4/–	4/–	13/–	3/–
- Source: CricketArchive, 23 July 2009

Desmond Randolph Chumney (born 8 January 1968) is a Canadian cricketer. He is a right-handed batsman and a right-arm offbreak bowler. He played 13 One Day Internationals for Canada, including the 2003 World Cup.

When Canada beat Bangladesh in that World Cup, Chumney ran around the field with a Canada flag. He also played in three ICC Intercontinental Cup matches, three ICC Trophy tournaments and the 2004 ICC Americas Championship. He was selected for the 2007 Cricket World Cup and made 27* in his last appearance for Canada.
