= 2004 Champions Trophy =

Cricket tournament

2004 ICC Champions Trophy
- Dates: 10 – 25 September 2004
- Administrator: International Cricket Council
- Cricket format: One Day International
- Tournament format(s): Round-robin and knockout
- Host: England
- Champions: West Indies (1st title)
- Runners-up: England
- Participants: 12
- Matches: 15
- Player of the series: (Cricket West Indies) Ramnaresh Sarwan
- Most runs: (England) Marcus Trescothick (261)
- Most wickets: (England) Andrew Flintoff (9)

The 2004 ICC Champions Trophy was held in England in September 2004. Twelve teams competed in 15 matches spread over 16 days at three venues: Edgbaston, The Rose Bowl and The Oval. The nations competing included the ten Test nations, Kenya (ODI status), and – making their One Day International debut – the United States who qualified by winning the 2004 ICC Six Nations Challenge by the smallest of margins (coming down to net run rate over Canada, Namibia, and the Netherlands who had all recently played in the 2003 Cricket World Cup).

In the final, West Indies defeated England by 2 wickets to win their maiden Champions Trophy title. This was their first major tournament win since the 1979 Cricket World Cup. Ramnaresh Sarwan was named the Player of the Tournament.

== Qualification ==
Twelve teams participated in the tournament: the ten Test-playing nations, along with Kenya, who held full One Day International (ODI) status, and the United States who qualified after winning the 2004 ICC Six Nations Challenge.

Qualification	Berths	Country
Host	1	England
ICC ODI Ranking	10	Australia
ICC ODI Ranking	10	Bangladesh
ICC ODI Ranking	10	India
ICC ODI Ranking	10	Kenya
ICC ODI Ranking	10	New Zealand
ICC ODI Ranking	10	Pakistan
ICC ODI Ranking	10	South Africa
ICC ODI Ranking	10	Sri Lanka
ICC ODI Ranking	10	West Indies
ICC ODI Ranking	10	Zimbabwe
2004 ICC Six Nations Challenge	1	United States

== Prize money ==
The total prize money for the tournament was $1.25 million, with $400,000 for the winners of the final which was an increase of $100,000 from the last time the tournament was held in 2002.

== Tournament structure ==
Just like the previous tournament, teams were divided into pools and the first-placed teams of the respective pools at the end of pool stage would qualify to the knockout stage. The 12 teams— 10 Test playing nations (plus Kenya and United States)— were divided into four pools of three teams each, with every team playing two matches.

Australia , New Zealand and United States were placed in Pool A. South Africa, West Indies and Bangladesh were placed in Pool B. Pakistan, India and Kenya were placed in Pool C while Sri Lanka, England and Zimbabwe were placed in Pool D. The semi finals were played between the winners of Pool A, Pool D and winners of Pool B and C.

=== Participating teams ===
Pool A	Pool B	Pool C	Pool D
Australia	Bangladesh	India	England
New Zealand	South Africa	Kenya	Sri Lanka
United States	West Indies	Pakistan	Zimbabwe

=== Points system ===
Results	Points
Win	2 points
Tie/No Result	1 point
Loss	0 points

== Venues ==
Three cities hosted the tournament's matches: London (at The Oval), Birmingham (at Edgbaston) and Southampton (at Rose Bowl).

London	Birmingham	Southampton
The Oval	Edgbaston Cricket Ground	Rose Bowl
Capacity: 18,500	Capacity: 17,500	Capacity: 16,000
The Oval	Edgbaston	Rose Bowl

== Match officials ==
Match referees

- (England) Chris Broad
- (Cricket West Indies) Clive Lloyd
- (Sri Lanka) Ranjan Madugalle
- (South Africa) Mike Procter

Umpires

- (New Zealand) Billy Bowden
- (Cricket West Indies) Steve Bucknor
- (Pakistan) Aleem Dar
- (Cricket West Indies) Billy Doctrove
- (Australia) Darrell Hair
- (Australia) Daryl Harper
- (South Africa) Rudi Koertzen
- (England) Jeremy Lloyds
- (England) David Shepherd
- (Australia) Simon Taufel

== Pool matches ==
=== Pool A ===
Pos	Team	Pld	W	L	T	NR	Pts	NRR
1	Australia	2	2	0	0	0	4	3.237
2	New Zealand	2	1	1	0	0	2	1.603
3	United States	2	0	2	0	0	0	−5.121

Source: ESPNCricInfo

10 September 2004
Scorecard

New Zealand; 347/4 (50 overs)	v	United States; 137 (42.4 overs)
Nathan Astle 145* (151); Richard Staple 2/76 (10 overs)		Clayton Lambert 39 (84); Jacob Oram 5/36 (9.4 overs)

New Zealand won by 210 runs
The Oval, London
Umpires: Billy Doctrove (WI) and David Shepherd (Eng)
Player of the match: Nathan Astle (NZ)

- United States won the toss and elected to field.
- Aijaz Ali, Rohan Alexander, Jignesh Desai, Howard Johnson, Mark Johnson, Steve Massiah, Rashid Zia, Tony Reid, Leon Romero and Richard Staple (all USA) made their ODI debuts.
- Rashid Zia (USA) made his List A debut.
- Points: New Zealand 2, United States 0.

13 September 2004
Scorecard

United States; 65 (24 overs)	v	Australia; 66/1 (7.5 overs)
Steve Massiah 23 (42); Michael Kasprowicz 4/14 (7 overs)		Adam Gilchrist 24* (25); Howard Johnson 1/26 (3 overs)

Australia won by 9 wickets
Rose Bowl, Southampton
Umpires: Aleem Dar (Pak) and Billy Bowden (NZ)
Player of the match: Michael Kasprowicz (Aus)

- Australia won the toss and elected to field.
- Donovan Blake and Nasir Javed (both USA) made their ODI debuts.
- Points: Australia 2, United States 0.

16 September 2004
Scorecard

New Zealand; 198/9 (50 overs)	v	Australia; 199/3 (37.2 overs)
Brendon McCullum 47 (68); Michael Kasprowicz 3/32 (10 overs)		Andrew Symonds 71* (47); Scott Styris 1/9 (2 overs)

Australia won by 7 wickets
The Oval, London
Umpires: Steve Bucknor (WI) and Rudi Koertzen (SA)
Player of the match: Andrew Symonds (Aus)

- Australia won the toss and elected to field.
- Points: Australia 2, New Zealand 0.

=== Pool B ===
Pos	Team	Pld	W	L	T	NR	Pts	NRR
1	West Indies	2	2	0	0	0	4	1.471
2	South Africa	2	1	1	0	0	2	1.552
3	Bangladesh	2	0	2	0	0	0	−3.111

Source: ESPNCricInfo

12 September 2004
Scorecard

Bangladesh; 93 (31.3 overs)	v	South Africa; 94/1 (17.5 overs)
Nafees Iqbal 40 (59); Charl Langeveldt 3/17 (7 overs)		Graeme Smith 42* (52); Tapash Baisya 1/39 (6 overs)

South Africa won by 9 wickets
Edgbaston, Birmingham
Umpires: Jeremy Lloyds (Eng) and Simon Taufel (Aus)
Player of the match: Charl Langeveldt (SA)

- Bangladesh won the toss and elected to bat.
- Aftab Ahmed and Nazmul Hossain (both Ban) made their ODI debuts.
- Nazmul Hossain (Ban) made his List A debut.
- Points: South Africa 2, Bangladesh 0.

15 September 2004
Scorecard

West Indies; 269/3 (50 overs)	v	Bangladesh; 131 (39.3 overs)
Chris Gayle 99 (132); Tapash Baisya 2/58 (10 overs)		Khaled Mahmud 34* (51); Mervyn Dillon 5/29 (10 overs)

West Indies won by 138 runs
Rose Bowl, Southampton
Umpires: Aleem Dar (Pak) and Jeremy Lloyds (Eng)
Player of the match: Chris Gayle (WI)

- Bangladesh won the toss and elected to field.
- Points: West Indies 2, Bangladesh 0

18–19 September 2004
Scorecard

South Africa; 246/6 (50 overs)	v	West Indies; 249/5 (48.5 overs)
Herschelle Gibbs 101 (135); Chris Gayle 3/50 (10 overs)		Ramnaresh Sarwan 75 (99); Makhaya Ntini 2/26 (5 overs)

West Indies won by 5 wickets
The Oval, London
Umpires: Jeremy Lloyds (Eng) and David Shepherd (Eng)
Player of the match: Ramnaresh Sarwan (WI)

- West Indies won the toss and elected to field.
- Rain meant that only 6 overs of the West Indies innings could be played; the remainder was played on the reserve day.
- Points: West Indies 2, South Africa 0

=== Pool C ===
Pos	Team	Pld	W	L	T	NR	Pts	NRR
1	Pakistan	2	2	0	0	0	4	1.413
2	India	2	1	1	0	0	2	0.944
3	Kenya	2	0	2	0	0	0	−2.747

Source: ESPNCricInfo

11 September 2004
Scorecard

India; 290/4 (50 overs)	v	Kenya; 192/7 (50 overs)
Sourav Ganguly 90 (124); Thomas Odoyo 2/43 (10 overs)		Morris Ouma 49 (93); Harbhajan Singh 3/33 (10 overs)

India won by 98 runs
Rose Bowl, Southampton
Umpires: Daryl Harper (Aus) and Rudi Koertzen (SA)
Player of the match: Sourav Ganguly (Ind)

- Kenya won the toss and elected to field.
- Ragheb Aga and Maurice Ouma (both Ken) made their ODI debuts.
- Points: India 2, Kenya 0.

14–15 September 2004
Scorecard

Kenya; 94 (32 overs)	v	Pakistan; 95/3 (18.4 overs)
Kennedy Otieno 33 (73); Shahid Afridi 5/11 (6 overs)		Yasir Hameed 41 (48); Ragheb Aga 2/17 (4 overs)

Pakistan won by 7 wickets
Edgbaston, Birmingham
Umpires: Billy Doctrove (WI) and Darrell Hair (Aus)
Player of the match: Shahid Afridi (Pak)

- Pakistan won the toss and elected to field.
- No play was possible on 14 September, so the reserve day had to be used.
- Malhar Patel (Ken) made his ODI debut.
- Points: Pakistan 2, Kenya 0.

19 September 2004
Scorecard

India; 200 (49.5 overs)	v	Pakistan; 201/7 (49.2 overs)
Rahul Dravid 67 (108); Naved-ul-Hasan 4/25 (9 overs)		Mohammed Yousuf 81* (114); Irfan Pathan 3/34 (9 overs)

Pakistan won by 3 wickets
Edgbaston, Birmingham
Umpires: Rudi Koertzen (SA) and Simon Taufel (Aus)
Player of the match: Mohammed Yousuf (Pak)

- Pakistan won the toss and elected to field.
- Points: Pakistan 2, India 0.

=== Pool D ===
Pos	Team	Pld	W	L	T	NR	Pts	NRR
1	England	2	2	0	0	0	4	2.716
2	Sri Lanka	2	1	1	0	0	2	−0.252
3	Zimbabwe	2	0	2	0	0	0	−1.885

Source: ESPNCricInfo

10–11 September 2004
Scorecard

England; 299/7 (50 overs)	v	Zimbabwe; 147 (39 overs)
Paul Collingwood 80 (93); Ed Rainsford 2/43 (10 overs)		Elton Chigumbura 42* (47); Andrew Flintoff 3/11 (6 overs)

England won by 152 runs
Edgbaston, Birmingham
Umpires: Steve Bucknor (WI) and Simon Taufel (Aus)
Player of the match: Paul Collingwood (Eng)

- Zimbabwe won the toss and elected to field.
- Rain meant that only 38 overs of the England innings could be played; the remainder was played on the reserve day.
- Points: England 2, Zimbabwe 0.

14 September 2004
Scorecard

Zimbabwe; 191 (49.1 overs)	v	Sri Lanka; 195/6 (43.5 overs)
Elton Chigumbura 57 (71); Nuwan Zoysa 3/19 (10 overs)		Marvan Atapattu 43 (80); Elton Chigumbura 3/37 (8.5 overs)

Sri Lanka won by 4 wickets
The Oval, London
Umpires: Daryl Harper (Aus) and David Shepherd (Eng)
Player of the match: Elton Chigumbura (Zim)

- Sri Lanka won the toss and elected to field.
- Points: Sri Lanka 2, Zimbabwe 0

17–18 September 2004
Scorecard

England; 251/7 (50 overs)	v	Sri Lanka; 95/5 (24 overs)
Andrew Flintoff 104 (91); Chaminda Vaas 2/51 (10 overs)		Sanath Jayasuriya 27 (32); Andrew Flintoff 2/21 (5 overs)

England won by 49 runs (D/L method)
Rose Bowl, Southampton
Umpires: Billy Bowden (NZ) and Darrell Hair (Aus)
Player of the match: Andrew Flintoff (Eng)

- Sri Lanka won the toss and elected to field.
- Rain meant that only 32 overs of the England innings could be played; the remainder was played on the reserve day.
- Rain on the reserve day reduced Sri Lanka's innings to 24 overs, with a revised target of 145 runs.
- Points: England 2, Sri Lanka 0.

== Knockout matches ==
Semifinals
A1	Australia	259/9 (50 overs)
D1	England	262/4 (46.3 overs)
C1	Pakistan	131 (38.2 overs)
B1	West Indies	132/3 (28.1 overs)

Final
D1	England	217 (49.4 overs)
B1	West Indies	218/8 (48.5 overs)

=== Semi-finals ===
21 September 2004
Scorecard

Australia; 259/9 (50 overs)	v	England; 262/4 (46.3 overs)
Damien Martyn 65 (91); Darren Gough 3/48 (7 overs)		Michael Vaughan 86 (122); Brett Lee 2/65 (8.3 overs)

England won by 6 wickets
Edgbaston, Birmingham
Umpires: Billy Bowden (NZ) and Rudi Koertzen (SA)
Player of the match: Michael Vaughan (Eng)

- England won the toss and elected to field.

22 September 2004
Scorecard

Pakistan; 131 (38.2 overs)	v	West Indies; 132/3 (28.1 overs)
Yasir Hameed 39 (56); Corey Collymore 2/24 (9 overs)		Ramnaresh Sarwan 56* (85); Shoaib Akhtar 2/18 (7 overs)

West Indies won by 7 wickets
Rose Bowl, Southampton
Umpires: Darrell Hair (Aus) and Simon Taufel (Aus)
Player of the match: Ramnaresh Sarwan (WI)

- Pakistan won the toss and elected to bat.
- Salman Butt (Pak) made his ODI debut.

=== Final ===
25 September 2004
Scorecard

England; 217 (49.4 overs)	v	West Indies; 218/8 (48.5 overs)
Marcus Trescothick 104 (124); Wavell Hinds 3/24 (10 overs)		Shivnarine Chanderpaul 47 (66); Andrew Flintoff 3/38 (10 overs)

West Indies won by 2 wickets
The Oval, London
Umpires: Rudi Koertzen (SA) and Simon Taufel (Aus)
Player of the match: Ian Bradshaw (WI)

- West Indies won the toss and elected to field.
- West Indies won the 2004 ICC Champions Trophy.
- Ryan Hinds played his last ODI game.

== Statistics ==
Most runs
Runs	Player	Team
261	Marcus Trescothick	England
166	Ramnaresh Sarwan	West Indies
163	Nathan Astle	New Zealand
141	Paul Collingwood	England
139	Chris Gayle	West Indies

- Source: CricketArchive

Most wickets
Wickets	Player	Team
9	Andrew Flintoff	England
8	Steve Harmison	England
7	Michael Kasprowicz	Australia
7	Chris Gayle	West Indies
6	4 players	

- Source: CricketArchive
