= Malhar Patel =

Kenyan cricketer (born 1983)

Personal information
- Full name: Malhar L. Patel
- Born: 27 November 1983 (age 42); Mathare, Nairobi, Kenya
- Nickname: Malo
- Batting: Right-handed
- Role: Batsman

International information
- National side: Kenya (2004–2006)
- ODI debut (cap 29): 14 September 2004 v Pakistan
- Last ODI: 14 November 2006 v Bermuda

Career statistics
Competition	ODI	FC	LA
Matches	3	6	7
Runs scored	40	84	55
Batting average	13.33	8.40	7.85
100s/50s	0/0	0/0	0/0
Top score	25	35	25
Catches/stumpings	0/0	3/0	1/0
- Source: Cricinfo, 13 May 2017

Malhar L Patel (born 27 November 1983) is a former Kenyan cricketer. A right-handed middle order batsman, he made his One Day International debut in the 2004 Champions Trophy match versus Pakistan at Edgbaston in Birmingham.
