= Leon Romero =

American cricketer

Personal information
- Full name: Leon Constantine Romero
- Born: 29 December 1974 (age 51); New York, USA
- Batting: Right-handed
- Bowling: Right-arm medium
- Role: Batsman

International information
- National side: United States
- ODI debut (cap 9): 10 September 2004 v New Zealand
- Last ODI: 13 September 2004 v Australia

Career statistics
Competition	ODI	FC	LA
Matches	2	10	8
Runs scored	1	275	187
Batting average	0.50	18.33	23.37
100s/50s	0/0	0/0	0/1
Top score	1	48	57
Balls bowled	24	18	28
Wickets	1	0	1
Bowling average	52.00	–	57.00
5 wickets in innings	0	–	0
10 wickets in match	0	–	0
Best bowling	1/52	–	1/52
Catches/stumpings	1/0	15/0	5/1
- Source: CricketArchive, 18 October 2008

Leon Constantine Romero (born 29 December 1974) is an American cricketer. A right-handed batsman, right-arm medium pace bowler and occasional wicket-keeper, he played two One Day Internationals (ODIs) for the United States national cricket team in the 2004 ICC Champions Trophy, having previously played first-class and List A cricket for Trinidad and Tobago.

== Biography ==
=== Trinidad and Tobago career ===
Born in New York in 1974, Leon Romero first played cricket in Trinidad and Tobago. He played for the Trinidad and Tobago under-19 team in 1994, and played several matches for North and East Trinidad against South and Central Trinidad between 1996 and 2000.

He made his first-class debut in January 1999, playing in the Busta Cup against Guyana. He played further matches against the Windward Islands, Jamaica and Barbados that season, and played a match against India A later in the year.

He played twice in the 2000 Busta Cup, against the Leeward Islands and the Windward Islands and made his List A debut later in the year, playing in the Red Stripe Bowl against Barbados, Jamaica and Canada. He played against Guyana and West Indies B in the 2001 Busta Cup, before his career in Trinidad finished in 2002 with a match for North Trinidad against South Trinidad.

=== International career ===
Romero first played for the US in 2004. His first match for them, and his final first-class match, was an ICC Intercontinental Cup match against Canada in Fort Lauderdale. He made his ODI debut later in the year, playing against New Zealand and Australia in the ICC Champions Trophy in England. He took the wicket of Hamish Marshall in the New Zealand match, his only wicket in first-class or List A cricket.

He last played for the US in the 2005 ICC Trophy in Ireland. After warm-up matches against the Northern Cricket Union President's XI and Namibia, he played three matches in the tournament proper against Denmark, Bermuda and Oman.
