= Rohan Alexander =

Jamaican-born American cricketer (born 1973)

Personal information
- Full name: Rohan Phillmore Alexander
- Born: February 20, 1973 (age 53); Jamaica
- Batting: Left-handed
- Bowling: Off spin
- Role: Batsman

International information
- National side: United States
- ODI debut (cap 2): September 10, 2004 v New Zealand
- Last ODI: September 13, 2004 v Australia

Career statistics
Competition	ODI	LA	ICC T
Matches	2	14	12
Runs scored	34	229	278
Batting average	17.00	19.08	27.80
100s/50s	0/0	0/2	1/0
Top score	26	55	110*
Catches/stumpings	0/0	3/0	5/0
- Source: CricketArchive, October 11, 2008

Rohan Phillmore Alexander (born February 20, 1973) is a Jamaican-born American former cricketer. A left-handed batsman and off spin bowler, he played two One Day Internationals (ODIs) for the United States national cricket team in the 2004 ICC Champions Trophy.

== Biography ==
Born in Jamaica in 1973, Rohan Alexander played his club cricket in New York City and first played for the US in 1998 when he made his List A debut against the Leeward Islands in the Red Stripe Bowl. He also played against his native Jamaica and Barbados in the tournament.

He next played for the US in the Americas Championship, playing one match against the Cayman Islands at the Maple Leaf Cricket Club in King City. The following year, he played in the 2001 ICC Trophy in Ontario.

In 2002, he played in the Americas Championship in Buenos Aires and he returned to List A cricket in 2004 when he played in the ICC 6 Nations Challenge in the United Arab Emirates. He made his ODI debut later that year, playing against New Zealand and Australia in the ICC Champions Trophy in England.

His last matches for the USA came in the 2005 ICC Trophy in Ireland. After a warm-up match against the Northern Cricket Union President's XI he played four matches in the tournament proper against the UAE, Denmark, Uganda and Papua New Guinea.
