= Howard Johnson (cricketer) =

Jamaican-born American cricketer

Personal information
- Full name: Howard Ray Johnson
- Born: 16 August 1964 (age 62); Jamaica
- Batting: Right-handed
- Bowling: Right-arm medium-fast
- Role: Bowler

International information
- National side: United States
- ODI debut (cap 4): 10 September 2004 v New Zealand
- Last ODI: 13 September 2004 v Australia

Career statistics
Competition	ODI	FC	LA
Matches	2	2	10
Runs scored	9	6	10
Batting average	9.00	3.00	16.50
100s/50s	0/0	0	0/0
Top score	9	2*	16*
Balls bowled	60	316	394
Wickets	1	9	9
Bowling average	69.00	13.22	34.11
5 wickets in innings	0	1	0
10 wickets in match	0	0	0
Best bowling	1/26	5/38	3/18
Catches/stumpings	0/–	6/–	4/–
- Source: CricketArchive, 14 October 2008

Howard Ray Johnson (born 16 August 1964) is a Jamaican-born American former cricketer. A right-handed batsman and right-arm medium-fast bowler, he played for the United States national cricket team from 2002 until 2005 and played two One Day Internationals (ODIs) during the 2004 ICC Champions Trophy.

== Biography ==
Born in Jamaica in 1964, Howard Johnson first played for the US in the 2002 Americas Championship in Buenos Aires. He made his List A debut in 2004 when he played in the ICC 6 Nations Challenge in the United Arab Emirates and his first-class debut later in the year when he played in the ICC Intercontinental Cup against Canada and Bermuda.

In between the two matches in the Intercontinental Cup, he played in the Americas Championship in Bermuda, winning the man of the match award against the Cayman Islands when he took 5/12.

He last played for the US in the 2005 ICC Trophy in Ireland. After playing a warm-up game against Namibia he played three matches in the tournament proper, against the UAE, Bermuda and Oman. Those three matches also represent the end of his List A career.
