= Nasir Javed =

Pakistani-born American cricketer (born 1966)

Personal information
- Born: 21 June 1966 (age 60); Lahore, Punjab, Pakistan
- Nickname: Charlie
- Batting: Right-handed
- Bowling: Leg break googly

International information
- National side: United States
- Only ODI (cap 13): 13 September 2004 v Australia

Domestic team information
- Years: Team
- 1984/85–1987/88: Lahore City
- 1986/1987: Servis Industries

Career statistics
Competition	ODI	FC	LA
Matches	1	13	14
Runs scored	2*	204	13
Batting average	–	12.75	3.25
100s/50s	0/0	0/0	0/0
Top score	2*	40	5
Balls bowled	–	2,082	604
Wickets	–	54	16
Bowling average	–	19.07	31.18
5 wickets in innings	–	0	0
10 wickets in match	–	0	0
Best bowling	–	6/56	4/39
Catches/stumpings	0/–	5/–	1/–
- Source: CricketArchive, 3 February 2011

Nasir Javed (born 21 June 1966) is a Pakistani-born American cricket coach and former cricketer. Javed was a right-handed batsman who bowled leg break googly. He was born in Kabootarpura neighborhood of Lahore, Punjab.

== Career ==
Javed began his cricket career in his native Pakistan, playing first-class cricket for Lahore City in 1984–85, Lahore City Whites in 1984–85 and Servis Industries in 1986–87 as a bowler. Later he emigrated to the United States of America and played for his adopted country in the 1998–99 Red Stripe Bowl in Jamaica, the 2001 ICC Trophy in Canada, and the 2002 ICC Americas Championship in Argentina. Javed also played in the 2004 ICC Six Nations Challenge, which the Americans won to qualify for the 2004 ICC Champions Trophy in England. Javed competed in the second-ever One Day International played by the United States, a heavy defeat to Australia at the Rose Bowl. Javed later played for the United States in the 2005 ICC Trophy.
