= Richard Staple =

Jamaican-born American cricketer

Personal information
- Full name: Richard Wayne Staple
- Born: 25 November 1969 (age 56); Kingston, Jamaica
- Batting: Right-handed
- Bowling: Right arm off break
- Role: Batsman

International information
- National side: United States
- ODI debut (cap 10): 10 September 2004 v New Zealand
- Last ODI: 13 September 2004 v Australia

Domestic team information
- Years: Team
- 1998–2005: United States
- 1990–1995: Jamaica

Career statistics
Competition	ODI	FC	LA
Matches	2	22	32
Runs scored	4	712	498
Batting average	2.00	18.25	17.17
100s/50s	0/0	0/3	0/3
Top score	4	79	94
Balls bowled	60	206	532
Wickets	2	1	11
Bowling average	38.00	123.00	48.81
5 wickets in innings	0	0	0
10 wickets in match	0	0	0
Best bowling	2/76	1/32	2/5
Catches/stumpings	0/0	14/0	12/0
- Source: CricketArchive, 21 October 2008

Richard Wayne Staple (born 25 November 1969) is a Jamaican-born former American cricketer. A right-handed batsman and off spin bowler, he was captain of the United States national cricket team at the 2004 ICC Champions Trophy, where the USA played their only One Day International (ODI) to date. He had previously played first-class and List A cricket for his native Jamaica.

== Biography ==
=== Career for Jamaica ===
Born in Kingston in 1969, Richard Staple first played for Jamaica at Under-19 level, playing in the Northern Telecom Youth Championships in August 1989. He made his first-class debut for Jamaica the following year, playing against England.

He played twice in the Red Stripe Cup against the Leeward Islands and Barbados in February 1991, and went on the West Indies tour of England that year, playing against a World XI at the North Marine Road ground in Scarborough.

He became a regular member of the Jamaican side over the next three years, playing 16 Red Stripe Cup matches between 1992 and 1995. He made his List A debut in 1992, playing against the Leeward Islands in the Geddes Grant Shield. He played twelve List A matches for Jamaica in all, also playing for them twice against Bermuda in December 1993. He didn't play for Jamaica after his final first-class match for them in 1995.

=== Career for USA ===
More than three years after his final first-class match for Jamaica, Staple returned to competitive cricket when he made his debut for the USA against the Leeward Islands in the Red Stripe Bowl. He next played for them on a tour of England in 2000, playing against a combined Minor Counties team. He also played for them in that year's Red Stripe Bowl.

He played for the US at the 2001 ICC Trophy in Ontario, by now captaining the side. He next played for the US in the 2004 ICC 6 Nations Challenge in the United Arab Emirates.

He first played first-class cricket for the US in 2004, playing ICC Intercontinental Cup matches against Canada and Bermuda. In between the two matches, he played in the Americas Championship in Bermuda. Later that year he played his only two ODIs, against New Zealand and Australia in the ICC Champions Trophy in England.

He last played for the US in the 2005 ICC Trophy in Ireland. After warm-up matches against the Northern Cricket Union President's XI and Namibia, he played six matches in the tournament proper. Shortly afterwards, he was axed as the USA captain and he has not played for them since.
