= Rashid Zia =

American cricketer (born 1974)

Personal information
- Born: 6 April 1974 (age 52); Gujranwala, Pakistan
- Batting: Right-handed
- Bowling: Right-arm offbreak

International information
- National side: United States
- ODI debut (cap 8): 10 September 2004 v New Zealand
- Last ODI: 13 September 2004 v Australia
- Source: ESPNcricinfo, 13 September 2004

Rashid Zia (born 6 April 1974) is a Pakistani cricketer who played international cricket for the United States. Rashid Zia first played for the United States in representative cricket in the 2001 ICC Trophy, and later was part of the team that played United States' first two One Day Internationals in the 2004 ICC Champions Trophy in England.
