= Aijaz Ali =

Pakistani-born American cricketer

Personal information
- Born: June 20, 1968 (age 58); Karachi, Sindh, Pakistan
- Batting: Right-handed
- Bowling: Right-arm medium-fast
- Role: Batsman

International information
- National side: United States
- ODI debut (cap 1): September 10, 2004 v New Zealand
- Last ODI: September 13, 2004 v Australia

Career statistics
Competition	ODI	FC	LA
Matches	2	2	11
Runs scored	5	82	88
Batting average	2.50	20.50	14.66
100s/50s	0/0	0/0	0/0
Top score	4	36	35
Balls bowled	–	48	18
Wickets	–	0	1
Bowling average	–	–	29.00
5 wickets in innings	–	–	0
10 wickets in match	–	–	0
Best bowling	–	–	1/10
Catches/stumpings	1/0	2/0	4/0
- Source: CricketArchive, October 7, 2008

Aijaz Ali (Urdu: اعجاز علی) (born June 20, 1968) is a Pakistani born American former cricketer. A right-handed batsman and right-arm medium-fast bowler, he played for the United States national cricket team between 1993 and 2005. He played two One Day Internationals (ODIs) for them in 2004.

== Biography ==
Born in Karachi in 1968, Aijaz Ali made his debut for the US in 1993. He played in the 1994 ICC Trophy in Nairobi and the 1997 ICC Trophy in Kuala Lumpur. He made his List A debut in the 2000 Red Stripe Bowl, playing matches against Jamaica, Canada and Trinidad & Tobago.

He played in the 2001 ICC Trophy in Ontario and returned to the USA side in 2004 when he played in the ICC 6 Nations Challenge in the United Arab Emirates. He made his first-class debut in 2004, playing matches in the ICC Intercontinental Cup against Canada in Fort Lauderdale and against Bermuda in Hamilton. In between those two matches, he played in the Americas Championship in Bermuda.

Later in 2004, he played his only two ODIs in the 2004 ICC Champions Trophy in England, playing against New Zealand and Australia. He last played for the US in 2005, playing in the 2005 ICC Trophy in Ireland. After warm-up matches against the Northern Cricket Union President's XI and Namibia, he played three matches in the tournament itself, playing against Uganda and Bermuda in the group stage and against Oman in the 9th place play-off.
