= Clayton Lambert =

West Indian cricketer

Personal information
- Full name: Clayton Benjamin Lambert
- Born: 10 February 1962 (age 64); Berbice, British Guiana
- Batting: Left-handed
- Bowling: Right-arm off-break

International information
- National sides: West Indies (1991–1998); United States (2004)
- Test debut (cap 198): 8 August 1991; West Indies v England
- Last Test: 10 December 1998; West Indies v South Africa
- ODI debut (cap 58/6): 15 March 1990; West Indies v England
- Last ODI: 10 September 2004; United States v New Zealand

Career statistics
Competition	Test	ODI
Matches	5	12
Runs scored	284	407
Batting average	31.55	33.91
100s/50s	1/1	1/2
Top score	104	119
Balls bowled	10	12
Wickets	1	0
Bowling average	5.00	–
5 wickets in innings	0	–
10 wickets in match	0	–
Best bowling	1/4	–
Catches/stumpings	8/–	0/–
- Source: CricInfo, 10 September 2004

Clayton Benjamin Lambert (born 10 February 1962) is a Guyanese-American former cricketer, who played for the West Indies and later for the United States.

== Career ==
Lambert made his debut for Guyana at the Regional Under 19 level in 1979, and captained the Berbice team in 1980.

Lambert first appeared in the West Indies team for a One Day International in 1990 against England in Georgetown, against whom he also made an unsuccessful Test match debut at The Oval in 1991. Although he played in four ODIs in Sharjah in 1991/92, he did not return to the West Indies side until 1997–98, where he made centuries in both the fifth ODI and the sixth Test against England before struggling in the series against South Africa and being dropped from the Test side. According to Statistician Charwayne Walker in 2014, Lambert's 151 against Barbados at Bourda in 1997 is still the highest score by a Guyanese batsman at the Regional one day level.

Lambert returned to international cricket aged 42, playing for the United States in the 2004 ICC Champions Trophy.

Lambert also played first-class cricket for Guyana and played for Northern Transvaal in 1993. Lambert now played for Lawrenceville in the Atlanta Georgia Cricket Conference from 2012 to 2014.

He coaches cricket in the US.

== See also ==
- List of cricketers who have played for more than one international team
