= Jignesh Desai =

American cricketer (born 1974)

Personal information
- Born: 18 April 1974 (age 52); Pipalgabhan, Gujarat, India
- Batting: Left-handed
- Bowling: Right-arm off-break

International information
- National side: United States
- Only ODI (cap 3): 10 September 2004 v New Zealand
- Source: CricInfo, 10 September 2004

Jignesh Harshadrai Desai (born April 18, 1974) is an Indian-born American former cricketer who represented the United States cricket team in four matches from 2003–04 to 2004. His record includes one first-class game in the 2004 ICC Intercontinental Cup and three one-day games, the last one of which was in the first ever One Day International the US played, which was against New Zealand in the 2004 ICC Champions Trophy.
