= Mark Johnson (cricketer, born 1963) =

Jamaican-born American cricketer

Personal information
- Full name: Mark Rickland Johnson
- Born: 28 October 1963 (age 63); Jamaica
- Batting: Left-handed
- Role: Wicket-keeper

International information
- National side: United States
- ODI debut (cap 5): 10 September 2004 v New Zealand
- Last ODI: 13 September 2004 v Australia
- ODI shirt no.: 12

Career statistics
Competition	ODI	FC	LA
Matches	2	2	16
Runs scored	20	106	212
Batting average	10.00	26.50	13.25
100s/50s	0/0	0/0	0/1
Top score	20	46	67
Catches/stumpings	1/0	6/0	14/5
- Source: CricketArchive, 14 October 2008

Mark Rickland Johnson (born 28 October 1963) is a Jamaican-born American former cricketer. A left-handed batsman and wicket-keeper, he played for the United States national cricket team between 2000 and 2005 and played two One Day Internationals (ODIs) in the 2004 ICC Champions Trophy.

== Biography ==
Born in Jamaica in 1963, Mark Johnson first played for the US in 2000 when he played against a combined Minor Counties team on a tour of England. He made his List A debut later in the year against Jamaica and played four matches in total in that year's Red Stripe Bowl. The following year he played in the 2001 ICC Trophy in Ontario.

He next played for the US in 2004, when he played in the ICC 6 Nations Challenge in the United Arab Emirates. He also made his first-class debut in the same year, playing in the ICC Intercontinental Cup against Canada and Bermuda. In between the two Intercontinental Cup matches he played in the Americas Championship in Bermuda. Later in the year he played his only two ODIs, against New Zealand and Australia in the ICC Champions Trophy.

He last played for the US in the 2005 ICC Trophy in Ireland. After playing warm-up matches against the Northern Cricket Union President's XI and Namibia he played five matches in the tournament proper against the UAE, Denmark, Uganda, Bermuda and Papua New Guinea. Those five matches also represent the end of his List A career.
