= Steve Massiah =

Guyanese-born American cricketer

Personal information
- Full name: Steven J Massiah
- Born: 21 June 1979 (age 47); Georgetown, Guyana
- Batting: Right-handed
- Bowling: Right-arm off spin
- Role: Batsman

International information
- National side: United States
- ODI debut (cap 7): 10 September 2004 v New Zealand
- Last ODI: 13 September 2004 v Australia

Domestic team information
- Years: Team
- 2000–2014: United States

Career statistics
Competition	ODI	FC	LA	T20
Matches	2	2	17	3
Runs scored	23	160	503	8
Batting average	11.50	40.00	38.69	8.00
100s/50s	0/0	1/0	1/3	0/0
Top score	23	104	108*	5*
Balls bowled	–	66	157	–
Wickets	–	1	8	–
Bowling average	–	35.00	20.37	–
5 wickets in innings	–	0	0	–
10 wickets in match	–	0	0	–
Best bowling	–	1/10	2/20	–
Catches/stumpings	0/–	1/–	4/–	0/–
- Source: CricketArchive, 14 April 2010

Steve J Massiah (born 21 June 1979) is a Guyana-born American former cricketer and cricket administrator . A right-handed batsman and off spin bowler, he played for the United States national cricket team and was captain of the side. He played two One Day Internationals (ODIs) for the US in the 2004 ICC Champions Trophy.

== Biography ==
Born in Georgetown in 1979, Steve Massiah played for the Guyana Under-19s team twelve times between 1996 and 1998 before making his debut for the USA against a combined Minor Counties side on a tour of England in 2000. He made his List A debut later in the year, playing in the Red Stripe Bowl against Jamaica, Canada, Barbados and Trinidad & Tobago.

He did not play for the national side again until 2004 when he played in the ICC 6 Nations Challenge in the United Arab Emirates. He made his first-class debut the same year when he played ICC Intercontinental Cup matches against Canada and Bermuda. In between the two matches he played in the Americas Championship in Bermuda. He played his two ODIs the same year, playing in the ICC Champions Trophy against New Zealand and Australia.

He next represented the US in the 2005 ICC Trophy in Ireland. After warm-up matches against the Northern Cricket Union President's XI and Namibia he played six matches in the tournament proper. He scored 108 not out against Uganda, his highest List A score. He captained the US for the first time the next year in the ICC Americas Championship tournament in Ontario.

He represented his adopted country in Division Five of the World Cricket League in Jersey in 2008 where he again captained the side. He made his Twenty20 debut on 9 February 2010, for the United States in the 2010 ICC World Twenty20 Qualifier in the United Arab Emirates.

He was arrested in December 2011 in connection with an alleged $50 million mortgage fraud.

In 2012 Massiah was selected for the 2012 ICC World Cricket League Division Four which takes place from 3 to 10 September 2012 in Malaysia. He last played for the US in October 2014, and is now involved as an administrator.
