= Donovan Blake =

Jamaican-born American cricketer (born 1961)

Personal information
- Born: 4 December 1961 (age 64); Jamaica
- Batting: Right-handed
- Bowling: Right-arm medium-fast

International information
- National side: United States
- Only ODI (cap 12): 13 September 2004 v Australia
- Source: CricInfo, 13 September 2004

Donovan Livingston Blake (born 4 December 1961 in Jamaica) is a Jamaican-born American cricketer.

Blake was born in Jamaica and emigrated to the United States in the late 1970s.

Blake first represented the United States in the 2001 ICC Trophy and he went on to represent the States in a first-class game in the 2004 ICC Intercontinental Cup and then in their second ever One Day International, when they lost to Australia at the Rose Bowl, Southampton, England in 2004. This was his only ODI he played for United States he scored 0 runs and bowled one over conceding 7 runs and no wicket.
