= United States national cricket team =

Sports team representing the U.S. internationally

United States
- Nickname(s): Stars and Stripes
- Association: USA Cricket

Personnel
- Captain: Monank Patel
- Coach: Shane Watson

International Cricket Council
- ICC status: Associate member with ODI status (1965)
- ICC region: Americas
ICC Rankings	Current	Best-ever
ODI	15th	11th (Aug 1, 2026)
T20I	13th	13th (May 5, 2026)

One Day Internationals
- First ODI: v. New Zealand at The Oval, London; September 10, 2004
- Last ODI: v. Namibia at Grand Prairie Stadium, Grand Prairie; October 13, 2026
ODIs	Played	Won/Lost
Total	86	46/37 (3 ties, 0 no results)
This year	11	6/5 (0 ties, 0 no results)
- World Cup Qualifier appearances: 9 (first in 1979)
- Best result: 7th (2001)

T20 Internationals
- First T20I: v. United Arab Emirates at ICC Academy Ground, Dubai; March 15, 2019
- Last T20I: v. Namibia at M. A. Chidambaram Stadium, Chennai; February 15, 2026
T20Is	Played	Won/Lost
Total	58	31/22 (3 ties, 2 no results)
This year	4	2/2 (0 ties, 0 no results)
- T20 World Cup appearances: 2 (first in 2024)
- Best result: Super 8
ODI & T20I kit
- As of October 13, 2026

The United States men's national cricket team represents the United States in international cricket. The team was formerly organized by the United States of America Cricket Association (USACA), which became an associate member of the International Cricket Council (ICC) in 1965. In June 2017, the USACA was expelled by the ICC due to governance and financing issues, with the U.S. team being temporarily overseen by ICC Americas until a new governing body was established. In January 2019, associate membership was officially granted to USA Cricket. In September 2025, the ICC re-suspended USA Cricket for violations of membership obligations.

A U.S. representative team participated in the first international cricket match, played against Canada, in 1844. For a century and a half, the U.S. national team seldom played against other national teams. It played mostly against Canada (in the annual Auty Cup), or against visiting teams from other countries.

The United States made its international tournament debut at the 1979 ICC Trophy in England; it has since missed only two editions of the tournament (now known as the World Cup Qualifier). After winning the 2004 ICC Six Nations Challenge, the team qualified for the 2004 ICC Champions Trophy, playing its first two One Day International (ODI) matches. In April 2018, the ICC decided to grant full Twenty20 International (T20I) status to all its members. Therefore, all Twenty20 matches played between the United States and other ICC members after January 1, 2019, have the T20I status. The first T20I to be played by the United States was scheduled against the United Arab Emirates in March 2019.

In the World Cricket League, the U.S. finished fourth in the 2019 Division Two tournament, losing a third place playoff to Papua New Guinea, a match which was designated as an ODI (and thus became the United States' third-ever ODI match, 15 years after their last). This fourth-place finish was sufficient to earn the country a place in 2019–22 ICC Cricket World Cup League 2, in which all the team's matches would carry ODI status. The team's first domestic ODI series began on September 13, 2019, hosting Papua New Guinea and Namibia.

In their debut 2024 T20 World Cup game, the United States defeated rivals Canada by seven wickets. During their second match on June 6, the Americans upset heavily favored Pakistan in a Super Over for their second win of the tournament. The United States' shock defeat of Pakistan brought about widespread media exposure and also sparked optimism about the win potentially reflecting a "cricket transformation" in the U.S.

== History ==
=== Beginnings ===
Cricket was played throughout the Thirteen Colonies during the period of British America in the early 18th century. Cricket further grew in the 18th century. It is understood from anecdotal evidence that George Washington was a strong supporter of cricket, participating on at least one occasion in a game of wicket with his troops at Valley Forge during the American Revolution.

In 1844, the United States participated in the first international cricket match. This was played against Canada at the St George's Cricket Club Ground, Bloomingdale Park, New York. This first international sporting event was attended by 20,000 people and established the longest international sporting rivalry in the modern era. Wagers of around $120,000 were placed on the outcome of the match. This is equivalent to around $1.5 million in 2007.

24–26 September 1844
Scorecard

Canada	v	United States
82 (32 overs); David Winckworth, George Sharpe, Freeling 12; Samuel Wright 5		64; Robert Tinson 14; David Winckworth, Fred French 4
63; David Winckworth 14; Henry Groom 5		58; James Turner 14; George Sharpe 6

Canada won by 23 runs
St. George's Cricket Club, New York City
Attendance: 20,000
Umpires: J.H. Conolly, H. Russell, R. Waller

- United States of America won the toss and elected to field.
- Rain prevented any play occurring on Day 2. The match was extended into a third day.
- George Wheatcroft (batting for the USA) failed to arrive in time to take part in the match on the third day – Alfred Marsh fielded as the substitute for him.

Sides from England toured North America (taking in both the U.S. and Canada) following the English cricket seasons of 1859, 1868 and 1872. These were organized as purely commercial ventures. Most of the matches of these early touring teams were played "against odds", that is to say the home team was permitted to have more than eleven players (usually twenty-two) in order to make a more even contest.

=== Decline ===
In spite of cricket's popularity in the 18th and early 19th centuries, the game was supplanted by baseball in the 1850s and 1860s. As interest in baseball rose, the rules of that game were changed slightly to increase its popularity. For example, easily manufactured round bats were introduced to contrast the flat bats of cricket.

Another reason for cricket's decline in popularity may be that in the late 19th century American cricket remained an amateur sport reserved for the wealthy while England and Australia were developing a professional version of the game. As cricket standards improved with professionalism elsewhere in the world many North American cricket clubs stayed stubbornly elitist. Clubs such as Philadelphia CC and Merion abandoned cricket and converted their facilities to other sports.

By 1900, baseball was dominant numerically and culturally in the United States. In addition, when the first international body for the sport, the Imperial Cricket Conference (ICC) was formed in 1909, membership was restricted to countries in the British Empire. This undercut the popularity of cricket outside the empire and reduced momentum to professionalize cricket in the United States. Whether a more open ICC would have maintained or increased the momentum remains an open question, however. Regardless of its cause, the game did not flourish in the United States the way it did in the British Empire. From the 1880s until the outbreak of World War I, cricket in the U.S. was dominated not by a truly national team, but by the amateur Philadelphia cricket team, which was selected from clubs in cricket's American stronghold – the Philadelphia metropolitan area.

A tour of North America by the Australians in 1913 saw two first-class games (both won by the tourists) against a combined Canada–U.S. team. (Note: Combined Canada/U.S. players included: Henry Humphries (Canada); John Dornan (United States); Arthur Hoskings (United States); Willard Graham (United States); William Newhall (United States); Timothy Bevington (Canada); Henry Humphries (Canada); Harold Furness (United States); Robert Anderson (United States); Henry Pearce (United States); Christie Morris (United States))

=== Philadelphian cricket ===
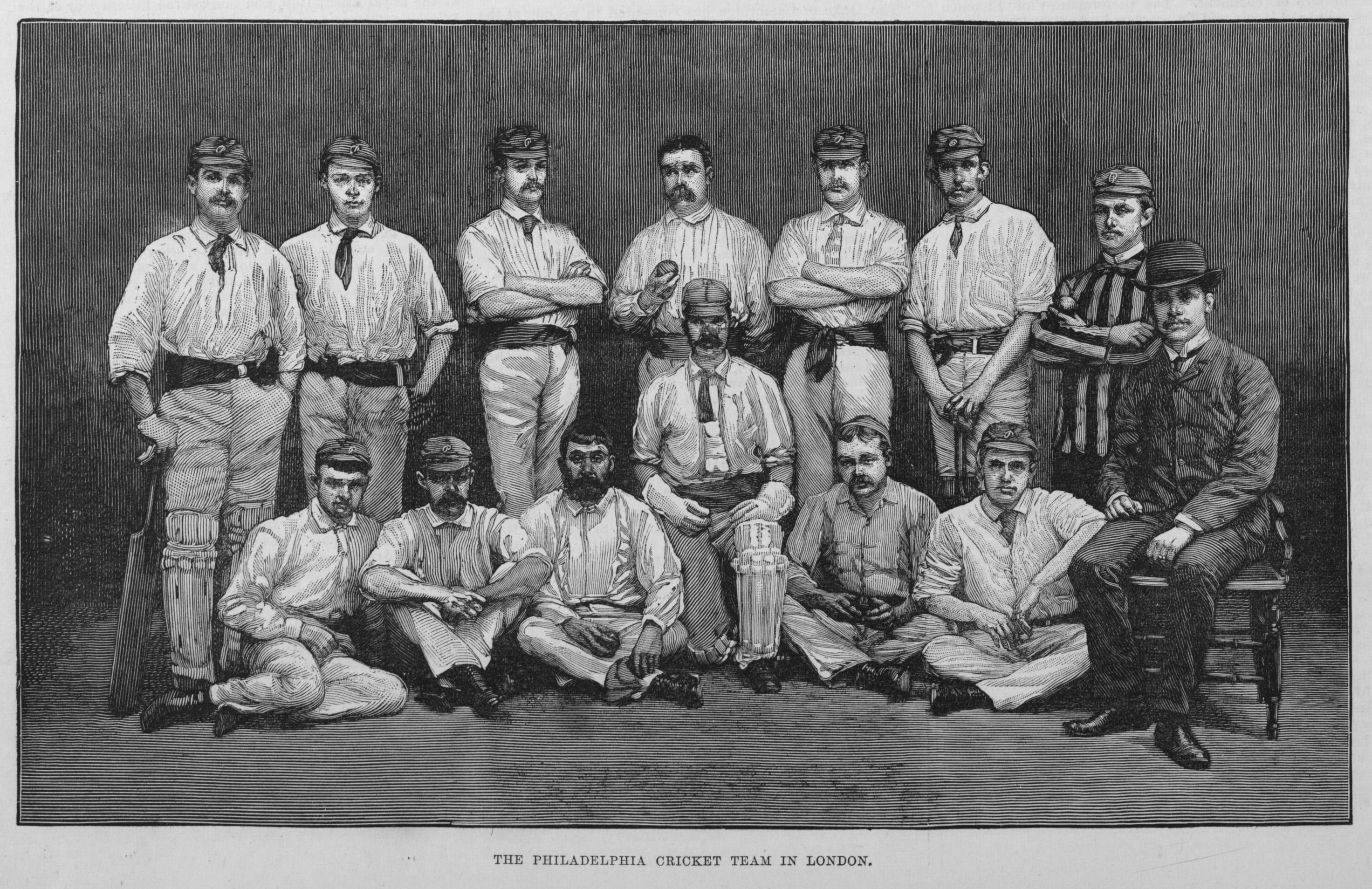
The Philadelphian cricket team, shown here on an 1884 tour of England, were the premier American cricket team for several decades after the Civil War

The Philadelphian cricket team was a team that represented Philadelphia in first-class cricket between 1878 and 1913. Even though the United States had played the first international cricket match against Canada in 1844, the sport began a slow decline in the country. This decline was furthered by the rise in popularity of baseball. In Philadelphia, however, the sport remained very popular and from the end of the 19th century until the outbreak of World War I, the city produced a first class team that rivaled many kids in the world. The team was composed of players from the four chief cricket clubs in Philadelphia–Germantown, Merion, Belmont, and Philadelphia. Players from smaller clubs, such as Tioga and Moorestown, and local colleges, such as Haverford and Penn, also played for the Philadelphians. Over its 35 years, the team played in 89 first-class cricket matches. Of those, 29 were won, 46 were lost, 13 were drawn and one game was abandoned before completion.

John Barton King was a prominent all-rounder during this period. During his career, he set numerous records in North America and at least one first-class bowling record. He competed with and succeeded against the best cricketers in the world from England and Australia. King was the dominant bowler on his team when it toured England in 1897, 1903, and 1908. He dismissed batsmen with his unique delivery, which he called "the angler", and helped to perfect swing bowling in the sport. Many of the great bowlers of today still use the strategies and techniques that he developed. Sir Pelham Warner described Bart King as one of the finest bowlers of all time, and Donald Bradman called him "America's greatest cricketing son."

On June 28, 1913, the Philadelphians played the last first-class game on the mainland for more than 90 years. Games were played in the US Virgin Islands in the interim, which is considered as part of the West Indies by the ICC. The team had played an American national side 6 times between 1885 and 1894. The United States team won one of these matches, lost two, and earned a draw in three. Cricket remained a minor pastime in the United States until the mid-1960s, when ICC reforms allowed associate members to join.

=== Status from 1965 ===
In 1965, Clifford Severn made his U.S. debut at 39, alongside his young brother Winston, in a two-day match against Canada at Calgary's Riley Park as part of the longest running international rivalry in international cricket, now known as the Auty Cup. A year later in the return contest at the C. Aubrey Smith Field in Los Angeles, the USA won by 54 runs.

In 1965, the Imperial Cricket Conference changed its name to the International Cricket Conference. In addition, new rules were adopted to permit the election of countries from outside the Commonwealth. This led to the expansion of the conference, with the admission of Associate Members, including the United States. Today cricket is played in all fifty states.

The U.S. have played in every edition of the ICC Trophy, though they didn't pass the first round until the 1990 tournament in the Netherlands. They reached the plate final of the 1994 tournament, but opted not to play due to prior travel arrangements. They finished twelfth in 1997.

=== 21st century ===
==== 2000–09 ====
The U.S. finished sixth in the 2001 ICC Trophy, their best performance to date. They have also played in every edition of the ICC Americas Championship, winning in 2002.

In 2004, the United States cricket team played a first-class match as part of the first ICC Intercontinental Cup. The matches against Canada and Bermuda were the first in many years. The team won the ICC 6 Nations Challenge beating Scotland, Namibia, the Netherlands, and the UAE on net run rate by 0.028 of a run.

Winning the ICC Six Nations meant that they qualified for the ICC Champions Trophy 2004 in England. Here the U.S. played their first One Day International match against New Zealand at The Oval on September 10, 2004.

September 10, 2004
Scorecard

New Zealand; 347/4 (50 overs)	v	United States; 137 (42.4 overs)
Nathan Astle 145* (151); Richard Staple 2/76 (10 overs)		Clayton Lambert 39 (84); Jacob Oram 5/36 (9.4 overs)

New Zealand won by 210 runs
The Oval, London
Umpires: Billy Doctrove (WI) and David Shepherd (Eng)
Player of the match: Nathan Astle (NZ)

- United States won the toss and elected to field.
- Aijaz Ali, Rohan Alexander, Jignesh Desai, Howard Johnson, Mark Johnson, Steve Massiah, Rashid Zia, Tony Reid, Leon Romero and Richard Staple (all U.S.) made their ODI debuts.
- Rashid Zia (U.S.) made his List A debut.
- Nathan Astle (NZ) made the highest individual score by a player in ICC Champions Trophy history.
- First ODI match for the United States

The U.S. side was beaten by New Zealand and lost to Australia in the tournament, as well.

The 2005 ICC Trophy represented a chance for the U.S. to re-establish themselves on the world stage and qualify for the 2007 World Cup. A poor showing saw them finish at the bottom of their group, with four losses and a match abandoned due to rain from their five group fixtures. This failure robbed the USA of the prize of full One Day International status on offer to the World Cup qualifiers. This failure was compounded on August 9, 2005, when the ICC removed the U.S. from the 2005 ICC Intercontinental Cup after legal disputes prevented them from naming a squad.

The United States made their return to international cricket in August 2006 when they participated in Division One of the ICC Americas Championship in Canada. They finished second in the five team tournament.

In 2007 the United States were to visit Darwin, Australia to take part in Division Three of the ICC World Cricket League. A top two finish in this tournament would have qualified them for Division Two of the same tournament later in the year. However, amid internal disputes over the constitution of the USACA, the team was forced to withdraw after the ICC suspended the USACA in March 2007. The dispute was resolved in early 2008, and the suspension was lifted on April 1 of that year.

The team's reinstatement permitted them to enter the World Cricket League in Division Five for 2008 in Jersey. The team made it through the Group Stage tied for first in their division with a 4–0–0 record (one match abandoned), but lost both their semi-final match with Jersey and their third-place play-off with Nepal.

==== 2010–2015 ====
The U.S. finished second in the 2010 Division Five after losing the final against Nepal and won promotion to 2010 Division Four. They continued their climb in more emphatic style by finishing first in 2010 Division Four, demolishing Italy in the final. They were promoted to 2011 Division Three where they took last place and were relegated to 2012 Division Four. There they finished in second place, and were promoted back to 2013 Division Three. They remained in Division Three after finishing in third place, but were relegated after finishing fifth in 2014 Division Three.

==== 2015 suspension ====
On June 26, 2015, the ICC again suspended USACA, this time because an ICC review "had expressed significant concerns about the governance, finance, reputation and cricketing activities of USACA". This suspension does not impact the National Team playing Matches, but instead cuts off ICC funding and stops USACA from being able to approve any events held in the United States (although the ICC can still approve events held in the United States). This suspension will be upheld until USACA can show the ICC that "conditions relating to governance, finance and its cricket activities" have improved.

In the 2016 World Cricket League Division Four, the United States finished second with a 3–2 record and was promoted to Division Three for 2017. In the 2017 Division Three competition, the U.S. finished fourth, with a 2–3 record. The third place match was rained out and finished with no result. The United States remained in Division Three.

==== 2017–2023: Transition to USA Cricket, Cricket World Cup League 2 ====
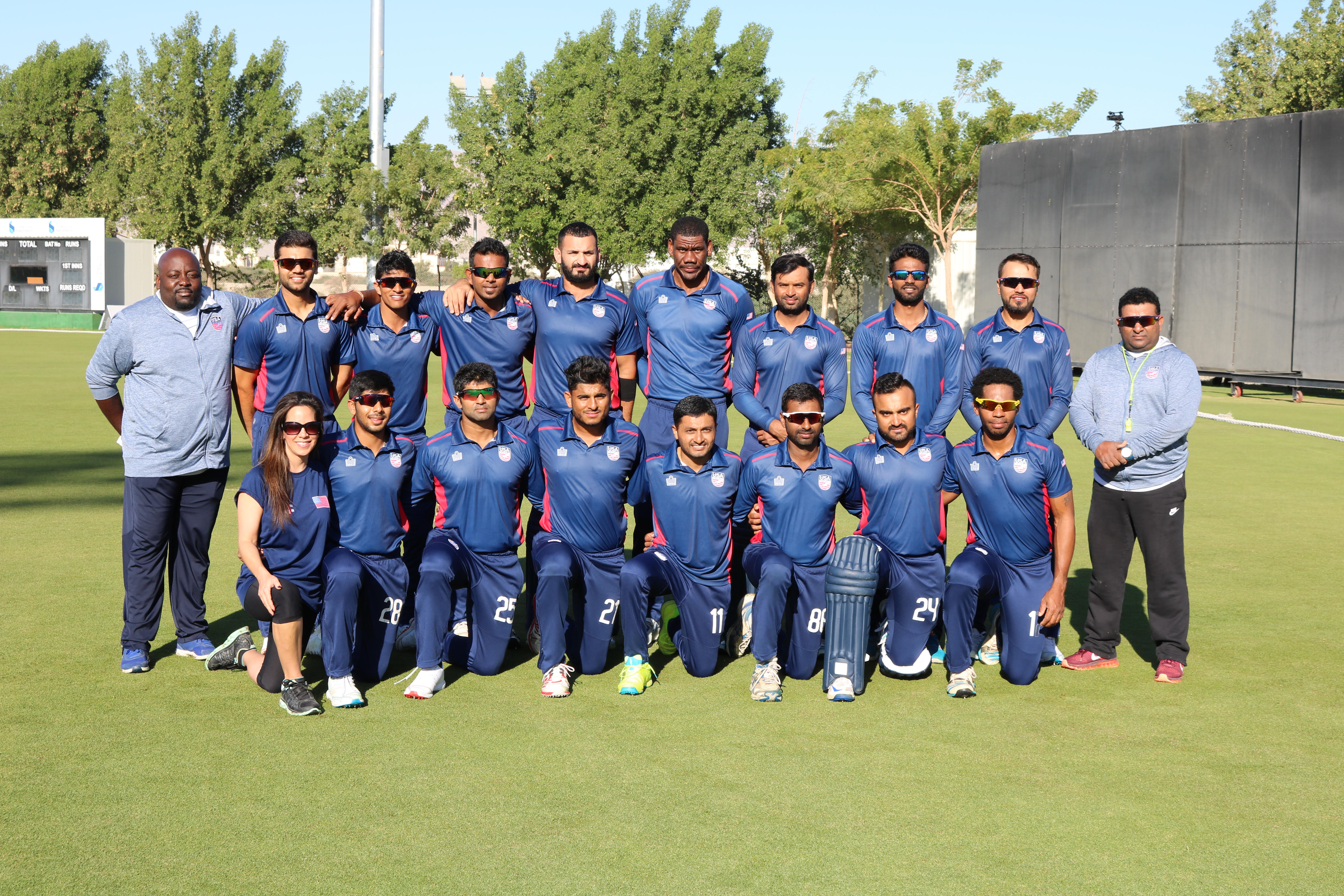
The U.S. national team, during their tour of the Middle East in December 2017.

On June 22, 2017, at the ICC Annual Conference in London, the ICC Full Council voted unanimously to expel the USACA over governance and finance issues, following a Board recommendation in April, and a recent Dispute Resolution Committee hearing before Michael Beloff, which concluded in June 2017. In January 2019, a new sanctioning body known as USA Cricket was officially admitted by the ICC as a new associate member.

After beating Singapore in the final match of the 2018 ICC World Cricket League Division Three, the United States were promoted to the Division Two for the first time. In April 2019, after finishing in the top 4 of the 2019 Division Two tournament, the United States qualified for the 2019–22 ICC Cricket World Cup League 2—which offers an opportunity to advance to the 2022 Cricket World Cup Qualifier. All matches in the Cricket World Cup League 2 are played in the One Day International format.

As of 2019, all ICC members were granted Twenty20 International (T20I) status. The United States made its T20I debut on March 15, 2019, against the United Arab Emirates at the ICC Academy Ground in Dubai.

March 15, 2019
2:00 p.m.
Scorecard

United States; 152/7 (15 overs)	v	United Arab Emirates; 29/2 (3.3 overs)
Steven Taylor 72 (39); Zahoor Khan 2/30 (3 overs)		Shaiman Anwar 18* (11); Jasdeep Singh 2/18 (2 overs)

No result
ICC Academy Ground, Dubai
Umpires: Akbar Ali (UAE) and Iftikhar Ali (UAE)

- United Arab Emirates won the toss and elected to field.
- Rain during the United Arab Emirates' innings prevented any further play.
- First T20I match for United States.

In November 2021, Ireland announced that it would play a five-match limited overs series against the United States in December 2021, leading into its ODI series against the West Indies in January 2022. This marked the first time that the United States had ever hosted a bilateral series with a Test nation. The series began with two T20Is; after a slow start, a high-scoring partnership of Sushant Modani and Gajanand Singh bolstered the team during the second half of its innings, contributing to a total haul of 188 runs. With Ireland falling short by 26 runs, the United States achieved its first-ever victory in an international match against a Test nation.

December 22, 2021
2:00 p.m.
Scorecard

United States; 188/6 (20 overs)	v	Ireland; 162/6 (20 overs)
Gajanand Singh 65 (42); Barry McCarthy 4/30 (4 overs)		Lorcan Tucker 57* (49); Saurabh Netravalkar 2/26 (4 overs)

United States won by 26 runs
Central Broward Park, Lauderhill
Umpires: Sameer Bandekar (USA) and Vijaya Mallela (USA)
Player of the match: Gajanand Singh (USA)

- United States won the toss and elected to bat.
- Ritwik Behera, Marty Kain, Sushant Modani, Yasir Mohammad and Ryan Scott (U.S.) all made their T20I debuts.
- This was U.S.' first win in an International cricket match in any format against a Full Member.

Ireland split the T20I series in the second match; batting first, the team was bowled out at 150, but the United States fell short in their innings by nine runs. The series was expected to continue on with ODI matches. However, on December 28, 2021, the entirety of the ODI series was cancelled after multiple postponements due to COVID-19 issues.

In December 2022, following its tour of Namibia, USA Cricket announced that Jagadeesh Arunkumar had been released as head coach of the men's national team.

==== 2023–present: T20 World Cup, World Cup League 2 ====
The United States took part in the 2023 Cricket World Cup Qualifier Play-off. They qualified for the 2023 Cricket World Cup Qualifier by defeating Jersey by 25 runs, making it their first appearance in the ICC World Cup Qualifier since 2005.

April 4, 2023
9:30 a.m.
Scorecard

United States; 231 (50 overs)	v	Jersey; 206 (47.4 overs)
Steven Taylor 79 (100); Benjamin Ward 4/39 (10 overs)		Asa Tribe 75 (104); Ali Khan 7/32 (9.4 overs)

United States won by 25 runs
United Ground, Windhoek
Umpires: Andrew Louw (Nam) and Claus Schumacher (Nam)
Player of the match: Ali Khan (USA)

- Jersey won the toss and elected to field.

Following a 4-0 whitewash of Canada in April, the United States played the Bangladeshi cricket team in a 3-game T20I series for first time. The United States won the first match of the series by 5 wickets, their first victory against Bangladesh across all formats, before securing their first series victory against a full member team in the second match by 6 runs.

May 23, 2024
09:00
Scorecard

United States; 144/6 (20 overs)	v	Bangladesh; 138 (19.3 overs)
Monank Patel 42 (38); Rishad Hossain 2/21 (4 overs)		Najmul Hossain Shanto 36 (34); Ali Khan 3/25 (3.3 overs)

United States won by 6 runs
Prairie View Cricket Complex, Houston
Umpires: Aditya Gajjar (USA) and Vijaya Mallela (USA)
Player of the match: Ali Khan (USA)

- Bangladesh won the toss and elected to field.
- USA's first ever series victory against an ICC Full Member.

The games were played as preparation ahead of their debut at the 2024 T20 World Cup, which the United States co-hosted alongside the West Indies. In their debut World Cup game, the United States defeated rivals Canada by seven wickets. During their second match on June 6, the Americans upset heavily favored Pakistan in a Super Over for their second win of the tournament. The United States' shock defeat of Pakistan brought about widespread media exposure and also sparked optimism about the win potentially reflecting a "cricket transformation" in the U.S.

June 6, 2024
10:30 UTC−5
Scorecard

Pakistan; 159/7 (20 overs)	v	United States; 159/3 (20 overs)
Babar Azam 44 (43); Nosthush Kenjige 3/30 (4 overs)		Monank Patel 50 (38); Mohammad Amir 1/25 (4 overs)

Match tied (United States won the Super Over)
Grand Prairie Stadium, Dallas, Texas
Umpires: Michael Gough (Eng) and Allahudien Palekar (SA)
Player of the match: Monank Patel (USA)

- United States won the toss and elected to field.
- This was the first time Pakistan and United States faced each other in T20Is.
- Babar Azam (Pak) became the highest run-scorer in T20Is, surpassing Virat Kohli.
- This was United States's first win against Pakistan in T20Is.
- Super Over: United States 18/1, Pakistan 13/1

The team's final group stage match against Ireland was rained out with no result, with both teams therefore receiving one point. The result ensured that the United States would clinch a second-place finish in their group and advance to the Super 8s (at the expense of Pakistan, Canada, and Ireland), and also automatically qualify for the 2026 Men's T20 World Cup as a result.

On February 18, 2025, during a 2024–2026 Cricket World Cup League 2 match against Oman in the 2025 Oman Tri-Nation Series, the United States achieved the lowest total successfully defended in a men's ODI, with 122 runs.

== Tournament history ==
Legend

- Champions
- Runners-up
- Third place/Semi-finals
- Hosts
- Q Qualified
- DNQ Did not qualify
- ▲ Promoted
- Remained in the same division
- ▼ Relegated

=== Cricket World Cup ===
Cricket World Cup record								Qualification record				
Year	Round	Position	Pld	W	L	T	NR	Pld	W	L	T	NR
(England) 1975	Not invited							No qualifiers held				
(England) 1979	Did not qualify							4	2	1	0	1
(England) (Wales) 1983	Did not qualify							7	1	2	0	4
(India) (Pakistan) 1987	Did not qualify							8	7	1	0	0
(Australia) (New Zealand) 1992	Did not qualify							6	4	2	0	0
(Pakistan) (India) (Sri Lanka) 1996	Did not qualify							7	5	2	0	0
(England) (Wales) (Scotland) (Republic of Ireland) (Netherlands) 1999	Did not qualify							7	3	4	0	0
(South Africa) (Zimbabwe) (Kenya) 2003	Did not qualify							9	3	6	0	0
(Cricket West Indies) 2007	Did not qualify							12	5	6	0	1
(India) (Sri Lanka) (Bangladesh) 2011	Did not qualify							7	4	2	0	1
(Australia) (New Zealand) 2015	Did not qualify							30	18	12	0	0
(England) (Wales) 2019	Did not qualify							18	8	9	0	1
(India) 2023	Did not qualify							47	20	24	2	1
(South Africa) (Zimbabwe) (Namibia) 2027	Did not qualify							36*	24	11	0	1
Total	—N/a	0/14	–	–	–	–	–	198	104	82	2	10

=== Cricket World Cup Qualifier ===
Cricket World Cup Qualifier record
Year	Round	Position	Pld	W	L	T	NR	Qual.
(Sri Lanka) 1979	Group stage	8/15	4	2	1	0	1	DNQ
(England) 1982	Group stage	8/16	7	1	2	0	4	DNQ
(England) 1986	Group stage	5/12	8	7	1	0	0	DNQ
(Netherlands) 1990	Second round	8/17	6	4	2	0	0	DNQ
(Kenya) 1994	Second round	11/20	7	5	2	0	0	DNQ
(Malaysia) 1997	Plate round	12/22	7	3	4	0	0	DNQ
(Canada) 2001	Super League	6/24	9	3	6	0	0	DNQ
(Ireland) 2005	Play-offs	10/12	7	1	5	0	1	DNQ
(South Africa) 2009	Did not qualify							
(New Zealand) 2014	Did not qualify							
(Zimbabwe) 2018	Did not qualify							
(Zimbabwe) 2023	Play-offs	10/10	6	0	6	0	0	DNQ
(Namibia) (South Africa) 2027	Qualified							
Total	0 Titles	9/13	61	26	29	0	6	—N/a

=== CWC League 2 ===
Cricket World Cup League 2 record
Year	Round	Position	Pld	W	L	T	NR	P/R
2019–2023	League stage	5/7	36	16	17	2	1	Same position
2024–2026	Winners	1/8	36	24	11	0	1	TBD
Total	1 Title	1/2	72	40	28	2	2	—N/a

=== Men's T20 World Cup ===
Men's T20 World Cup record										Qualification record				
Year	Round	Position	Pld	W	L	T	NR	Squad	Ref	Pld	W	L	T	NR
(South Africa) 2007	Not eligible; no ODI status									Not eligible; no ODI status				
(England) 2009	Not eligible; no ODI status									Not eligible; no ODI status				
(Cricket West Indies) 2010	Did not qualify									3	1	2	0	0
(Sri Lanka) 2012	Did not qualify									14	7	7	0	0
(Bangladesh) 2014	Did not qualify									16	10	5	0	1
(India) 2016	Did not qualify									12	7	5	0	0
(United Arab Emirates) (Oman) 2021	Did not qualify									12	7	5	0	0
(Australia) 2022	Did not qualify									11	8	3	0	0
(United States) (Cricket West Indies) 2024	Super 8	8/20	7	1	4	1	1	Squad		Qualified directly as co-hosts				
(India) (Sri Lanka) 2026	Group Stage	11/20	4	2	2	0	0	Squad		Qualified directly				
(Australia) (New Zealand) 2028	To be determined									To be determined				
Total	0 Titles	2/10	11	3	6	1	1	—N/a	—N/a	68	40	27	0	1

=== T20 World Cup Global Qualifier ===
Men's T20 World Cup Global Qualifier record
Year	Round	Position	Pld	W	L	T	NR	Qual.
(Ireland) 2008	Not eligible; no ODI status							
(United Arab Emirates) 2010	Group stage	6/8	3	1	2	0	0	DNQ
(United Arab Emirates) 2012	Group stage	12/16	9	3	6	0	0	DNQ
(United Arab Emirates) 2013	Group stage	15/16	8	2	5	0	1	DNQ
(Ireland) (Scotland) 2015	Group stage	10/14	6	3	3	0	0	DNQ
(United Arab Emirates) 2019	Did not qualify							
(Zimbabwe) 2022	Semi-finals	4/8	5	2	3	0	0	DNQ
(To be determined) 2028	Qualified							
Total	0 Titles	6/8	31	11	19	0	1	—N/a

=== T20 World Cup Americas Regional Final ===
T20 World Cup Americas Regional Final (Note: For the 2024 and 2026 Men's T20 World Cups, the final round of qualification in Americas was the ICC Americas Regional Final.) records
Year	Round	Position	Pld	W	L	T	NR	Qual.
(Bermuda) 2018	Round-robin	3/4	6	2	4	0	0	DNQ
(Antigua and Barbuda) 2021	Winners	1/7	6	6	0	0	0	Q
(Bermuda) 2023	Qualified directly to the T20 World Cup							
(Canada) 2025	Qualified directly to the T20 World Cup							
Total	2/4	1 Title	12	8	4	0	0	—N/a

=== Champions Trophy ===
Champions Trophy record
Year	Round	Position	Pld	W	L	T	NR	Squad	Ref
(Bangladesh) 1998	Did not qualify								
(Kenya) 2000	Did not qualify								
(Sri Lanka) 2002	Did not qualify								
(England) 2004	First Round	12/12	2	0	2	0	0	Squad	
(India) 2006	Did not qualify								
(South Africa) 2009	Did not qualify								
(England) (Wales) 2013	Did not qualify								
(England) (Wales) 2017	Did not qualify								
(Pakistan) (United Arab Emirates) 2025	Did not qualify								
(India) 2029	To be determined								
Total	0 Titles	1/10	2	0	2	0	0	—N/a	—N/a

=== Summer Olympics ===
Summer Olympics record
Year	Round	Position	Pld	W	L	T	NR
(France) 1900	Did not participate						
(United States) 2028	Qualified as hosts						
(Australia) 2032	To be determined						
Total	—N/a	1/2	–	–	–	–	–

=== North American Cup ===
Year	Round	Position	Pld	W	L	T	NR	Ref
(Cayman Islands) 2025	Champions	1/5	6	5	1	0	0	
(Cayman Islands) 2026	Did not participate							
Total	1 Title	1/2	6	5	1	0	0	—N/a

=== Other international tournaments ===
CWC Qualifier Play-off (ODI)	ICC Intercontinental Cup (FC)	World Cricket League (LA/OD/ODI)
2023: Winners (Q)	2004: First round; 2005: Qualified; later suspended	2007 (Division Three) : Relegated (▼); 2008 (Division Five) : 4th place; 2010 (Division Five) : Runners-up (▲); 2010 (Division Four) : Winners (▲); 2011 (Division Three) : 6th place (▼); 2012 (Division Four) : Runners-up (▲); 2013 (Division Three) : 3rd place; 2014 (Division Three) : 5th place (▼); 2016 (Division Four) : Winners (▲); 2017 (Division Three) : 4th place; 2018 (Division Three) : Runners-up (▲); 2019 (Division Two) : 4th place

=== Other regional tournaments ===
T20WC Americas Sub-regional Qualifiers (T20I)	ICC Americas Twenty20 Championship (T20)	ICC Americas Championship (List A)
2018: Winners (Q)	2010 (Division One): Winners; 2011 (Division One): Runners-up; 2013 (Division One): Winners; 2015 (Division One): Runners-up	2000: 3rd place; 2002: Winners; 2004: Runners-up; 2006 (Division One): Runners up; 2008 (Division One): Winners; 2010 (Division One): Runners-up; 2011 (Division One): Runners-up

== Stadiums ==
The only U.S. cricket stadiums to meet international standards and have ODI status are the Central Broward Regional Park in Lauderhill, Florida, and Moosa Stadium in Pearland, Texas. Other established U.S. facilities include Church Street Park in Morrisville, North Carolina; the Prairie View Cricket Complex in Houston, Texas; the Leo Magnus Cricket Complex in Los Angeles, California; and the Grand Prairie Stadium in Grand Prairie, Texas.

Stadium	City	Opened
Central Broward Park‡	Lauderhill (Miami)	2008
Grand Prairie Stadium	Grand Prairie (Dallas)	2022
Moosa Stadium‡	Pearland (Houston)	2022
Prairie View Cricket Complex	Prairie View (Houston)	2022
Oakland Coliseum	Oakland, California	2025

‡ Meets international standards.

Locations of all stadiums which have hosted international cricket matches within the United States

== Coaching staff ==
Position	Name
Team manager	Oscar Alavarez
Head coach	Pubudu Dassanayake
Assistant coach	Vincent Vinay Kumar
Physiotherapist	Jatin Maheshwari
Batting coach	Rishi Bharadwaj
Fast bowling coach	Dhammika Prasad
CEO	Johnathan Atkeison
Strength and conditioning coach	Mathew Skynner
Analyst	Sampath Seshadri

=== Coaching history ===
- 2012–2014: Robin Singh
- 2015–2016: Nasir Javed
- 2016–2019: Pubudu Dassanayake
- 2019–2020: James Pamment (interim)
- 2020–2022: J. Arunkumar
- 2023–2024: Kevin Darlington (interim)
- 2024: Stuart Law
- 2025–present: Pubudu Dassanayake

== Current roster ==
This lists all the active players who played for USA in the last 24 months or have been selected in the team's most recent squad.

Key

- S/N = Shirt number

Name	Age	Batting style	Bowling style	Zone	MLC Team	Forms	S/N	Last ODI	Last T20	Captaincy
Batters
Shayan Jahangir	31	Right-handed	—	South West	MI New York	ODI & T20I	30	(United Arab Emirates) 2025	(Namibia) 2026	
Sanjay Krishnamurthi	23	Right-handed	Slow left-arm orthodox	West	San Francisco Unicorns	ODI & T20I	27	(United Arab Emirates) 2025	(Namibia) 2026	
Saiteja Mukkamalla	22	Right-handed	Right-arm off spin	Mid-Atlantic	Texas Super Kings	ODI & T20I	12	(United Arab Emirates) 2025	(Namibia) 2026	
Utkarsh Srivastava	19	Right-handed	Right-arm off spin	South	MI New York	ODI & T20I	18	—	(Namibia) 2024	
All-rounders
Steven Taylor	33	Left-handed	Right-arm off spin	South	MI New York	ODI	8	(Netherlands) 2024	(Oman) 2025	
Milind Kumar	35	Right-handed	Right-arm off spin	Eastern	Texas Super Kings	ODI & T20I	14	(United Arab Emirates) 2025	(Namibia) 2026	
Shubham Ranjane	32	Right-handed	Right-arm medium		Texas Super Kings	ODI & T20I	26	(United Arab Emirates) 2025	(Namibia) 2026	
Shehan Jayasuriya	35	Left-handed	Right-arm off spin	South West	Seattle Orcas	ODI & T20I	31	(United Arab Emirates) 2025	(Namibia) 2025	
Harmeet Singh Baddhan	34	Left-handed	Slow left-arm orthodox	South West	Seattle Orcas	ODI & T20I	27	(United Arab Emirates) 2025	(Namibia) 2026	
Wicket-keepers
Monank Patel	33	Right-handed	—	Mid-Atlantic	MI New York	ODI & T20I	1	(United Arab Emirates) 2025	(Namibia) 2026	Captain
Andries Gous	32	Right-handed	—	South West	Washington Freedom	ODI & T20I	68	(United Arab Emirates) 2025	(Pakistan) 2026	
Spin bowlers
Nosthush Kenjige	35	Right-handed	Slow left-arm orthodox	South West	MI New York	ODI & T20I	64	(Nepal) 2025	(Netherlands) 2026	
Yasir Mohammad	24	Left-handed	Right-arm leg spin	Mid-Atlantic	Washington Freedom	ODI & T20I	88	(Oman) 2025	(Canada) 2025	
Mohammad Mohsin	30	Left-handed	Right-arm leg spin		Texas Super Kings	T20I	9	_	(Namibia) 2026	
Pace bowlers
Jessy Singh	33	Right-handed	Right-arm medium	Mid-Atlantic	Washington Freedom	ODI & T20I	29	(United Arab Emirates) 2025	(Canada) 2025	
Ali Khan	35	Right-handed	Right-arm fast-medium	_	Los Angeles Knight Riders	T20I	23	(United Arab Emirates) 2023	(Namibia) 2026	
Shadley van Schalkwyk	38	Left-handed	Right-arm medium	_	Los Angeles Knight Riders	ODI & T20I	16	(Oman) 2025	(Namibia) 2026	
Saurabh Netravalkar	35	Left-handed	Left-arm fast-medium	South West	Washington Freedom	ODI & T20I	20	(United Arab Emirates) 2025	(Namibia) 2026	
Stephen Wiig	33	Right-handed	Left-arm medium	West	Texas Super Kings	T20I	20	_	(Oman) 2025	
Ali Sheikh	24	Left-handed	Right-arm fast-medium	West	Seattle Orcas	T20I	89	_	(Canada) 2025	
Rushil Ugarkar	23	Right-handed	Right-arm fast-medium	West	MI New York	T20I	_	(United Arab Emirates) 2025		
Juanoy Drysdale	34	Right-handed	Right-arm fast-medium	East	San Francisco Unicorns	ODI & T20I	5	(United Arab Emirates) 2024	(Oman) 2025	
Abhishek Paradkar	26	Left-handed	Left-arm medium	West	Los Angeles Knight Riders	ODI & T20I	44	(Netherlands) 2024	(Namibia) 2024	
Ayan Desai	23	Left-handed	Left-arm medium	West	Seattle Orcas	T20I	13	—	(Canada) 2025	

Correct as of February 20, 2026

== Captains ==
Eight players have represented the United States as captain. The first American captain was Anil Kashkari, who was reprised of his role in 1979.

Richard Staple was the first American captain to captain the side in a One Day International (ODI), which occurred in 2004. After Staple retired in 2005, Steve Massiah took over his role as captain. However, Sushil Nadkarni captained the American side during the 2012 ICC World Twenty20 Qualifier.

In October 2013, Neil McGarrell was named U.S. captain in a 15-man squad for the 2013 ICC World Twenty20 Qualifier in the UAE. McGarrell had played four Tests and 17 ODIs for West Indies between 1998 and 2001. He made his debut for U.S. in 2012 against Canada and takes over from Steve Massiah who had captained for seven years.

In 2016, Steven Taylor was named as captain of the team, he led the U.S. to WCL Division four title on home soil in Los Angeles. Later when the U.S. failed to progress from Division three, he stepped down as captain to accept a professional contract with the Jamaica Scorpions. He had earlier captained the team in the 2013 Auty Cup against Canada, he was chosen as a stand-in captain for unavailable Steve Massiah.

In October 2018, Saurabh Netravalkar took over as captain of the team, after Ibrahim Khaleel was sacked. Khaleel was elected captain in 2017 and under his captainship USA won Auty Cup after a long gap.

In October 2021, Monank Patel took over as T20I and ODI captain from Saurabh Netravalkar.

In May 2024, Monank Patel was named as a captain in USA squad for 2024 ICC Men's T20 World Cup Tournament. Patel was injured during a group stage match, and Aaron Jones took over the captaincy for the rest of the tournament.

== Records ==
International Match Summary – United States

Last updated October 13, 2026

Playing Record
Format	M	W	L	T	NR	Inaugural Match
One Day Internationals	86	46	37	3	0	September 10, 2004
Twenty20 Internationals	58	31	22	3	2	March 15, 2019

=== One Day Internationals ===
- Highest team total: 361/3 v. Canada on September 24, 2024, at United Ground, Windhoek.
- Highest individual score: 173*, Jaskaran Malhotra v. Papua New Guinea on September 9, 2021, at Al Amerat Cricket Stadium, Muscat.
- Best innings bowling: 7/32, Ali Khan v. Jersey on April 4, 2023, at United Ground, Windhoek.

Most ODI runs for United States

Player	Runs	Average	Career span
Monank Patel	2,570	34.72	2019–2026
Aaron Jones	1,664	33.95	2019–2025
Saiteja Mukkamalla	1,605	40.12	2022–2026
Milind Kumar	1,380	62.72	2024–2026
Steven Taylor	1,265	25.81	2019–2024

Most ODI wickets for United States

Player	Wickets	Average	Career span
Saurabh Netravalkar	121	22.49	2019–2026
Nosthush Kenjige	70	31.35	2019–2026
Jessy Singh	59	35.79	2019–2026
Harmeet Singh	44	26.72	2024–2026
Nisarg Patel	42	30.50	2019–2023

ODI record versus other nations

Records complete to ODI #5033. Last updated October 13, 2026.

Opponent	M	W	L	T	NR	First match	First win
v. Full Members
Australia	1	0	1	0	0	September 13, 2004	
Ireland	1	0	1	0	0	June 30, 2023	
New Zealand	1	0	1	0	0	September 10, 2004	
West Indies	1	0	1	0	0	June 18, 2023	
Zimbabwe	1	0	1	0	0	June 26, 2023	
v. Associate Members
Canada	7	6	1	0	0	March 29, 2023	August 13, 2024
Jersey	1	1	0	0	0	April 4, 2023	April 4, 2023
Namibia	13	8	5	0	0	September 17, 2019	September 17, 2019
Nepal	13	6	6	1	0	February 8, 2020	September 17, 2021
Netherlands	4	0	4	0	0	June 22, 2023	
Oman	10	3	6	1	0	February 6, 2020	June 8, 2022
Papua New Guinea	10	7	2	1	0	April 27, 2019	September 13, 2019
Scotland	10	4	6	0	0	December 9, 2019	December 9, 2019
United Arab Emirates	13	11	2	0	0	December 8, 2019	December 8, 2019

=== Twenty20 Internationals ===
- Highest team total: 230/3 v. Canada on April 9, 2024, at Prairie View Cricket Complex, Houston.
- Highest individual score: 101*, Steven Taylor v. Jersey on July 11, 2022, at Bulawayo Athletic Club, Bulawayo.
- Best innings bowling: 5/12, Saurabh Netravalkar v. Singapore on July 12, 2022, at Bulawayo Athletic Club, Bulawayo.

Most T20I runs for United States

Player	Runs	Average	Career span
Monank Patel	1,011	27.32	2019–2026
Steven Taylor	822	31.61	2019–2025
Aaron Jones	770	24.06	2019–2025
Andries Gous	770	30.80	2024–2026
Saiteja Mukkamalla	737	40.94	2024–2026

Most T20I wickets for United States

Player	Wickets	Average	Career span
Saurabh Netravalkar	42	24.97	2019–2026
Harmeet Singh	31	23.09	2024–2026
Jessy Singh	31	28.67	2019–2024
Shadley van Schalkwyk	28	28.32	2024–2026
Nisarg Patel	27	13.96	2019–2024

T20I record versus other nations

Records complete to T20I #3713. Last updated February 15, 2026.

Opponent	M	W	L	T	N/R	First match	First win
v. Full members
Bangladesh	3	2	1	0	0	May 21, 2024	May 21, 2024
England	1	0	1	0	0	June 23, 2024	-
India	2	0	2	0	0	June 12, 2024	-
Ireland	2	1	1	0	0	December 22, 2021	December 22, 2021
Pakistan	2	0	1	1	0	June 6, 2024	
South Africa	1	0	1	0	0	June 19, 2024	-
West Indies	1	0	1	0	0	June 21, 2024	-
Zimbabwe	1	0	1	0	0	July 14, 2022	-
v. Associate Members
Argentina	1	1	0	0	0	November 11, 2021	November 11, 2021
Bahamas	2	2	0	0	0	November 13, 2021	November 13, 2021
Belize	1	1	0	0	0	November 7, 2021	November 7, 2021
Bermuda	5	3	2	0	0	August 18, 2019	November 8, 2021
Canada	12	7	3	1	1	August 21, 2019	April 7, 2024
Cayman Islands	3	3	0	0	0	August 19, 2019	August 19, 2019
Jersey	1	1	0	0	0	July 11, 2022	July 11, 2022
Namibia	3	3	0	0	0	October 1, 2024	October 1, 2024
Nepal	3	0	2	1	0	October 17, 2024	-
Netherlands	4	1	3	0	0	July 15, 2022	February 13, 2026
Oman	3	3	0	0	0	February 20, 2025	February 20, 2025
Panama	1	1	0	0	0	November 7, 2021	November 7, 2021
Papua New Guinea	1	0	1	0	0	July 17, 2022	-
Singapore	1	1	0	0	0	July 12, 2022	July 12, 2022
United Arab Emirates	4	1	2	0	1	March 15, 2019	September 30, 2024

== See also ==
- Cricket in the United States
- List of United States ODI cricketers
- List of United States Twenty20 International cricketers
- Major League Cricket
- Minor League Cricket
- Pro Cricket
- United States national under-19 cricket team
- United States women's national cricket team
- United States women's national under-19 cricket team
