= Six Nations Challenge =

Superseded biennial cricket tournament of the International Cricket Council

The ICC 6 Nations Challenge was a cricket tournament played every two years between 2000 and 2004. It was a tournament involving the best associate members of the International Cricket Council, who were joined in the first two tournaments by A teams from Zimbabwe (2000+2002) and Sri Lanka (2002 only). Its place has been taken in the international cricket calendar by the ICC World Cricket League Championship (initially known as World Cricket League Division One), which performs the same function.

== 2000 Tournament ==
The 2000 tournament was played in Harare, Zimbabwe, the hosts being represented by Zimbabwe A. They were joined by Kenya, and four European teams; Denmark, Ireland, The Netherlands and Scotland. It was then known as the ICC Emerging Nations tournament, and was won by Kenya.

Points Table
Team	Played	Won	Lost	NR	Abnd	Points	NetRR
Kenya	5	4	0	1	0	9	1.897
Netherlands	5	3	1	0	1	7	-0.048
Ireland	5	2	2	0	1	5	-0.338
Denmark	5	2	3	0	0	4	-0.570
Zimbabwe A	5	1	3	1	0	3	-0.163
Scotland	5	1	4	0	0	2	-0.312

== 2002 Tournament ==
The 2002 tournament was held in Windhoek, Namibia in April. Its purpose was to prepare the four associate teams for the 2003 Cricket World Cup. To this end, those four teams (Canada, Kenya, Namibia and the Netherlands) were joined by A teams from Zimbabwe and Sri Lanka. The tournament was again won by Kenya, who beat Sri Lanka A in the final.

=== Points Table ===
Team	Played	Won	Lost	NR	Bonus Pts	Points	NetRR
Sri Lanka A	5	4	0	1	3	21	1.536
Kenya	5	3	1	1	1	15	0.745
Zimbabwe A	5	3	2	0	2	14	0.368
Namibia	5	2	3	0	1	9	-0.011
Canada	5	1	4	0	0	4	-0.979
Netherlands	5	1	4	0	0	4	-1.161

=== Final ===
The final between Sri Lanka A and Kenya was played on 14 April 2002. Kenya won the toss and elected to field first. Sri Lanka were dismissed for 211. Jehan Mubarak top scored with 82, and Steve Tikolo was the pick of the Kenyan bowlers with 3/29. Kenya lost seven wickets in pursuit of their target, but still reached it in the 48th over for the three wicket win.

The Final was Umpired by Rudi Koertzen of South Africa and Zimbabwean Duncan Frost with Jeff Luck of Namibia serving as 3rd Umpire.

== 2004 Tournament ==
The 2004 tournament was held in Sharjah and Dubai in the United Arab Emirates. It served as a qualification tournament for the 2004 ICC Champions Trophy. With Kenya busy on a tour of the West Indies, the top five teams from the 2001 ICC Trophy (Canada, Namibia, Netherlands, Scotland and the UAE were joined by the USA. The USA went on to win the tournament and qualify for the Champions Trophy. It was a close tournament, with five teams all winning three games and losing two, the USA topped the table on net run rate by a tiny margin of 0.028.

Points Table
Team	Played	Won	Lost	Points	NetRR
United States	5	3	2	6	0.551
Scotland	5	3	2	6	0.523
Namibia	5	3	2	6	0.150
Netherlands	5	3	2	6	0.127
United Arab Emirates	5	3	2	6	-0.056
Canada	5	0	5	0	-1.212

== See also ==
- World Cricket League
