= Canada at the Cricket World Cup =

The Canada cricket team is the team that represents Canada in international cricket. Cricket has had its existence in the country since the 1750s, the sport gained a lot of popularity through the decades. But cricket has seen decline over the years, however it remains popular among the South Asian population of the country. The team is governed by Cricket Canada, which has been an associate member of the International Cricket Council since 1968. They qualified for their first World Cup at 1979 Cricket World Cup, after finishing as runners up of the 1979 ICC Trophy. The team did not play in the tournament again till 2003, they moved on to play in three editions in a row in 2003, 2007 and 2011.

== Cricket World Cup Record ==
Cricket World Cup record										Qualification record				
Year	Round	Position	Pld	W	L	T	NR	Ab (Note: Abandoned matches are not counted in the official records.)	Captain	Pld	W	L	T	NR
(England) 1975	Did not participate									No qualifiers				
(England) 1979	Group Stage	8/8	3	0	3	0	0	0	Bryan Mauricette	6	4	2	0	0
(England) 1983	Did not qualify									7	3	1	0	3
(India) (Pakistan) 1987	Did not qualify									8	5	3	0	0
(Australia) (New Zealand) 1992	Did not qualify									6	3	3	0	0
(India) (Pakistan) (Sri Lanka) 1996	Did not qualify									7	3	3	0	1
(England) (Scotland) (Republic of Ireland) (Netherlands) 1999	Did not qualify									7	3	2	0	2
(South Africa) (Zimbabwe) (Kenya) 2003	Group Stage	12/14	6	1	5	0	0	0	Joe Harris	10	6	4	0	0
(Cricket West Indies) 2007	Group Stage	14/16	3	0	3	0	0	0	John Davison	12	10	2	0	0
(India) (Bangladesh) (Sri Lanka) 2011	Group Stage	12/14	6	1	5	0	0	0	Ashish Bagai	13	8	5	0	0
(Australia) (New Zealand) 2015	Did not qualify									20	3	15	0	2
(England) (Wales) 2019	Did not qualify									18	9	8	0	1
(India) 2023	Did not qualify									20	16	3	0	1
Total	0 Titles	3/13	18	2	16	0	0	0	—	134	73	51	0	10

=== World Cup Record (By Team) ===
Cricket World Cup matches (By team)
Total : 2 Win – 0 Ties – 16 Losses – 18 games played
Against	Wins	Draws	Losses	Total
Australia	0	0	2	2
Bangladesh	1	0	0	1
England	0	0	2	2
Kenya	1	0	2	3
New Zealand	0	0	3	3
Pakistan	0	0	2	2
South Africa	0	0	1	1
Sri Lanka	0	0	2	2
West Indies	0	0	1	1
Zimbabwe	0	0	1	1

== Tournament results ==
=== 1979 World Cup ===
Squad

- Bryan Mauricette (c, wk)
- Charles Baksh
- Robert Callender
- Christopher Chappell
- Franklyn Dennis
- Cornelius Henry
- Tariq Javed
- Cecil Marshall
- Jitendra Patel
- Glenroy Sealy
- Martin Stead
- John Valentine
- John Vaughan
- Garnet Brisbane

Results

Group stage (Group A)				Semifinal	Final	Overall Result
Opposition Result	Opposition Result	Opposition Result	Rank	Opposition Result	Opposition Result	Overall Result
Pakistan; L by 8 wickets	England; L by 8 wickets	Australia; L by 7 wickets	4	Did not advance		Group stage
Source: ESPNcricinfo

Scorecards

Group stage (Group A)

9 June 1979
Scorecard

Canada; 139/9 (60 overs)	v	Pakistan; 140/2 (40.1 overs)
Glenroy Sealy 45 (110); Sarfraz Nawaz 3/26 (10 overs)		Sadiq Mohammad 57* (122); John Valentine 1/18 (9 overs)

Pakistan won by 8 wickets
Headingley, Leeds, England
Umpires: Dickie Bird (Eng) and Alan Whitehead (Eng)
Player of the match: Sadiq Mohammad (Pak)

14 June 1979
Scorecard

Canada; 45 (40.3 overs)	v	England; 46/2 (13.5 overs)
Franklyn Dennis 21 (99); Chris Old 4/8 (10 overs)		Graham Gooch 21* (31); Robert Callender 1/14 (6 overs)

England won by 8 wickets
Old Trafford, Manchester, England
Umpires: John Langridge (Eng) and Barrie Meyer (Eng)
Player of the match: Chris Old (Eng)

- Reserve day used; June 13 washed out.

16 June 1979
Scorecard

Canada; 105 (33.2 overs)	v	Australia; 106/3 (26 overs)
John Vaughan 29 (43); Alan Hurst 5/21 (10 overs)		Kim Hughes 27 (40); Cornelius Henry 2/27 (10 overs)

Australia won by 7 wickets
Edgbaston, Birmingham, England
Umpires: David Constant (Eng) and John Langridge (Eng)
Player of the match: Alan Hurst (Aus)

=== 2003 World Cup ===
Squad

- Joe Harris (c)
- Ashish Bagai (wk)
- John Davison
- Desmond Chumney
- Ian Billcliff
- Nicholas de Groot
- Fazil Samad
- Davis Joseph
- Barry Seebaran
- Ashish Patel
- Abdool Samad
- Austin Codrington
- Sanjayan Thuraisingam
- Nicholas Ifill
- Ishwar Maraj

Results

Pool stage (Pool B)							Super Sixes		Semifinal	Final	Overall Result
Opposition Result	Opposition Result	Opposition Result	Opposition Result	Opposition Result	Opposition Result	Rank	Opposition Result	Rank	Opposition Result	Opposition Result	Overall Result
Bangladesh; W by 60 runs	Kenya; L by 4 wickets	Sri Lanka; L by 9 wickets	West Indies; L by 7 wickets	South Africa; L by 118 runs	New Zealand; L by 5 wickets	6	Did not advance				Pool stage
Source: ESPNcricinfo

Scorecards

Group stage (Group A)

11 February 2003 (D/N)
Scorecard

Canada; 180 (49.1 overs)	v	Bangladesh; 120 (28 overs)
Ian Billcliff 42 (63); Sanwar Hossain 2/26 (10 overs)		Sanwar Hossain 25 (24); Austin Codrington 5/27 (9 overs)

Canada won by 60 runs
Kingsmead Cricket Ground, Durban
Umpires: Aleem Dar (Pak) and Brian Jerling (SA)
Player of the match: Austin Codrington (Can)

- Canada won the toss and elected to bat.

15 February 2003 (D/N)
Scorecard

Canada; 197 (49 overs)	v	Kenya; 198/6 (48.3 overs)
Ian Billcliff 71 (100); Thomas Odoyo 4/28 (10 overs)		Ravi Shah 61 (95); John Davison 3/15 (10 overs)

Kenya won by 4 wickets
Newlands Cricket Ground, Cape Town
Umpires: Arani Jayaprakash (Ind) and Nadeem Ghauri (Pak)
Player of the match: Thomas Odoyo (Ken)

- Canada won the toss and elected to bat.

19 February 2003
Scorecard

Canada; 36 (18.4 overs)	v	Sri Lanka; 37/1 (4.4 overs)
Joe Harris 9 (13); Prabath Nissanka 4/12 (7 overs)		Marvan Atapattu 24* (14); Sanjayan Thuraisingam 1/22 (2.4 overs)

Sri Lanka won by 9 wickets
Boland Park, Paarl
Umpires: David Shepherd (Eng) and Neil Mallender (Eng)
Player of the match: Prabath Nissanka (SL)

- Sri Lanka won the toss and elected to field.
- Canada posted the lowest ever score in a One Day International.

23 February 2003
Scorecard

Canada; 202 (42.5 overs)	v	West Indies; 206/3 (20.3 overs)
John Davison 111 (76); Vasbert Drakes 4/55(9.5 overs)		Brian Lara 73 (40); John Davison 1/36 (5 overs)

West Indies won by 7 wickets
Newlands Cricket Ground, Cape Town
Umpires: Dave Orchard (SA) and S Venkataraghavan (Ind)
Player of the match: John Davison (Can)

- West Indies won the toss and elected to field.

27 February 2003
Scorecard

South Africa; 254/8 (50 overs)	v	Canada; 136/5 (50 overs)
Boeta Dippenaar 80 (118); Ashish Patel 3/41 (7 overs)		Ishwar Maraj 53* (155); Makhaya Ntini 2/19 (10 overs)

South Africa won by 118 runs
Buffalo Park, East London
Umpires: Daryl Harper (Aus) and Kevan Barbour (Zim)
Player of the match: Boeta Dippenaar (SA)

- Canada won the toss elected to field.

3 March 2003
Scorecard

Canada; 196 (47 overs)	v	New Zealand; 197/5 (23 overs)
John Davison 75 (62); Jacob Oram 4/52 (10 overs)		Scott Styris 54* (38); John Davison 3/61 (10 overs)

New Zealand won by 5 wickets
Willowmoore Park, Benoni
Umpires: Arani Jayaprakash (Ind) and Brian Jerling (SA)
Player of the match: John Davison (Can)

- New Zealand won the toss elected to field.

=== 2007 World Cup ===
Squad

- John Davison (c)
- Ashish Bagai (wk)
- Geoff Barnett
- Ashif Mulla
- Qaiser Ali
- Ian Billcliff
- Desmond Chumney
- Austin Codrington
- George Codrington
- Anderson Cummins
- Sunil Dhaniram
- Abdool Samad
- Umar Bhatti
- Henry Osinde
- Kevin Sandher

Results

Group stage (Group C)				Super 8		Semifinal	Final	Overall Result
Opposition Result	Opposition Result	Opposition Result	Rank	Opposition Result	Rank	Opposition Result	Opposition Result	Overall Result
Kenya; L by 7 wickets	England; L by 51 runs	New Zealand; L by 114 runs	4	Did not advance				Group stage
Source: ESPNcricinfo

Scorecards

Group stage (Group C)

14 March
Scorecard

Canada; 199 (50 overs)	v	Kenya; 203/3 (43.2 overs)
Geoff Barnett 41 (50); Jimmy Kamande 2/25 (10 overs)		Steve Tikolo 72* (76); Anderson Cummins 1/32 (8 overs)

Kenya won by 7 wickets
Beausejour Stadium, Gros Islet
Umpires: Asad Rauf (Pak) and Peter Parker (Aus)
Player of the match: Steve Tikolo (Ken)

- Kenya won the toss and elected to field first.

18 March
Scorecard

England; 279/6 (50 overs)	v	Canada; 228/7 (50 overs)
Ed Joyce 66 (103); Sunil Dhaniram 3/41 (10 overs)		Ashif Mulla 58 (60); Ravi Bopara 2/43 (9 overs)

England won by 51 runs
Beausejour Stadium, Gros Islet
Umpires: Billy Doctrove (WI) and Peter Parker (Aus)
Player of the match: Paul Collingwood (Eng)

- Canada won the toss and elected to field.

22 March
Scorecard

New Zealand; 363/5 (50 overs)	v	Canada; 249 (49.2 overs)
Lou Vincent 101 (117); Kevin Sandher 2/58 (10 overs)		John Davison 52 (31); Jeetan Patel 3/25 (9.2 overs)

New Zealand won by 116 runs
Beausejour Stadium, Gros Islet
Umpires: Asad Rauf (Pak) and Billy Doctrove (WI)
Player of the match: Lou Vincent (NZ)

- Canada won the toss and elected to field.

=== 2011 World Cup ===
Squad

- Ashish Bagai (c, wk)
- Rizwan Cheema (vc)
- Harvir Baidwan
- Balaji Rao
- John Davison
- Parth Desai
- Tyson Gordon
- Ruvindu Gunasekera
- Nitish Kumar
- Hiral Patel
- Jimmy Hansra
- Khurram Chohan
- Henry Osinde
- Zubin Surkari
- Karl Whatham
- Hamza Tariq (wk)

Results

Group stage (Group A)							Semifinal	Final	Overall Result
Opposition Result	Opposition Result	Opposition Result	Opposition Result	Opposition Result	Opposition Result	Rank	Opposition Result	Opposition Result	Overall Result
Sri Lanka; L by 210 runs	Zimbabwe; L by 175 runs	Pakistan; L by 46 runs	Kenya; W by 5 wickets	New Zealand; L by 97 runs	Australia; L by 7 wickets	6	Did not advance		Group stage
Source: ESPNcricinfo

Scorecards

Group stage (Group C)

20 February 2011
14:30 (D/N)
Scorecard

Sri Lanka; 332/7 (50 overs)	v	Canada; 122 (36.5 overs)
Mahela Jayawardene 100 (81); John Davison 2/56 (8 overs)		Rizwan Cheema 37 (35); Nuwan Kulasekara 3/16 (6 overs)

Sri Lanka won by 210 runs
Mahinda Rajapaksa International Cricket Stadium, Sooriyawewa
Umpires: Ian Gould (Eng) and Shavir Tarapore (Ind)
Player of the match: Mahela Jayawardene (SL)

- Sri Lanka won the toss and elected to bat.

28 February 2011
09:30
Scorecard

Zimbabwe; 298/9 (50 overs)	v	Canada; 123 (42.1 overs)
Tatenda Taibu 98 (99); Balaji Rao 4/57 (10 overs)		Zubin Surkari 26 (48); Ray Price 3/16 (8 overs)

Zimbabwe won by 175 runs
Vidarbha Cricket Association Stadium, Nagpur
Umpires: Asad Rauf (Pak) and Bruce Oxenford (Aus)
Player of the match: Tatenda Taibu (Zim)

- Zimbabwe won the toss and elected to bat.

3 March 2011
14:30 (D/N)
Scorecard

Pakistan; 184 (43 overs)	v	Canada; 138 (42.5 overs)
Umar Akmal 48 (68); Harvir Baidwan 3/35 (8 overs)		Jimmy Hansra 43 (75); Shahid Afridi 5/23 (10 overs)

Pakistan won by 46 runs
R. Premadasa Stadium, Colombo
Umpires: Daryl Harper (Aus) and Nigel Llong (Eng)
Player of the match: Shahid Afridi (Pak)

- Pakistan won the toss and elected to bat.

7 March 2011
14:30 (D/N)
Scorecard

Kenya; 198 (50 overs)	v	Canada; 199/5 (45.3 overs)
Thomas Odoyo 51 (62); Henry Osinde 4/26 (10 overs)		Jimmy Hansra 70 (99); Nehemiah Odhiambo 2/45 (10 overs)

Canada won by 5 wickets
Feroz Shah Kotla Stadium, Delhi
Umpires: Asad Rauf (Pak) and Billy Doctrove (WI)
Player of the match: Henry Osinde (Can)

- Kenya won the toss and elected to bat.

13 March 2011
09:30
Scorecard

New Zealand; 358/6 (50 overs)	v	Canada; 261/9 (50 overs)
Brendon McCullum 101 (109); Harvir Baidwan 3/84 (9.1 overs)		Ashish Bagai 84 (87); Jacob Oram 3/47 (10 overs)

New Zealand won by 97 runs
Wankhede Stadium, Mumbai
Umpires: Bruce Oxenford (Aus) and Shavir Tarapore (Ind)
Player of the match: Brendon McCullum (NZ)

- Canada won the toss and elected to field.

16 March 2011
14:30 (D/N)
Scorecard

Canada; 211 (45.4 overs)	v	Australia; 212/3 (34.5 overs)
Hiral Patel 54 (45); Brett Lee 4/46 (8.4 overs)		Shane Watson 94 (90); John Davison 1/29 (4 overs)

Australia won by 7 wickets
M. Chinnaswamy Stadium, Bangalore
Umpires: Billy Bowden (NZ) and Amiesh Saheba (Ind)
Player of the match: Shane Watson (Aus)

- Canada won the toss and elected to bat.

== Records and statistics ==
=== Team records ===
Highest innings totals

Score	Opponent	Venue	Season
261/9 (50 overs)	New Zealand	Mumbai	2011
249 (49.2 overs)	New Zealand	Gros Islet	2007
228/7 (50 overs)	England	Gros Islet	2007
211 (45.4 overs)	Australia	Bengaluru	2011
202 (42.5 overs)	West Indies	Centurion	2003
Last updated: 16 March 2011

Lowest completed innings

Score	Opponent	Venue	Season
36 (18.4 overs)	Sri Lanka	Paarl	2003
45 (40.3 overs)	England	Manchester	1979
105 (33.2 overs)	Australia	Birmingham	2015
122 (36.5 overs)	Sri Lanka	Hambantota	2011
123 (42.1 overs)	Zimbabwe	Nagpur	2011
(unfinished innings excluded from this list) Last updated: 16 March 2011

=== Batting statistics ===
Most runs

Runs	Player	Mat	Inn	Avg	100s	50s	Period
343	Ashish Bagai	15	15	26.38	—	2	2003–2011
340	John Davison	14	14	26.15	1	2	2003–2011
251	Ian Billcliff	9	9	27.88	—	2	2003–2007
215	Jimmy Hansra	6	6	43.00	—	2	2011–2011
104	Zubin Surkari	6	6	17.33	—	—	2011–2011
Last updated: 16 March 2011

Highest individual innings

Score	Player	Opponent	Venue	Season
111	John Davison	West Indies	Centurion	2003
84	Ashish Bagai	New Zealand	Wankhede, Mumbai	2011
75	John Davison	New Zealand	Benoni	2003
71	Ian Billcliff	Kenya	Cape Town	2003
70*	Jimmy Hansra	New Zealand	Wankhede, Mumbai	2011
Last updated: 16 March 2011

Highest partnerships

Runs	Players	Opposition	Venue	Season
132 (4th wicket)	Jimmy Hansra (70) & Ashish Bagai (54)	v Kenya	New Delhi	2011
125 (4th wicket)	Jimmy Hansra (50) & Ashish Bagai (69)	v New Zealand	Mumbai	2011
96 (1st wicket)	Ishwar Maraj (16) & John Davison (72)	v West Indies	Centurion	2003
96 (5th wicket)	Ashif Mulla (58) & Abdool Samad (31)	v England	Gros Islet	2007
86 (4th wicket)	Joe Harris (31) & Ian Billcliff (53)	v Kenya	Cape Town	2003
Last updated: 16 March 2011

=== Bowling statistics ===
Most wickets

Wickets	Player	Matches	Avg.	Econ.	4W	5W	Period
17	John Davison	14	30.23	4.84	0	0	2003–2011
13	Harvir Baidwan	6	23.61	5.58	0	0	2011–2011
9	Balaji Rao	6	33.22	5.53	1	0	2011–2011
6	Austin Codrington	5	21.50	5.12	0	1	2003–2003
6	Henry Osinde	7	40.33	5.33	1	0	2007–2011
6	Rizwan Cheema	6	41.33	6.07	0	0	2011–2011
Last updated: 16 March 2011

Best bowling figures

Bowling Figures	Overs	Player	Opponent	Venue	Season
5/27	9.0	Austin Codrington	v Bangladesh	Durban	2003
4/26	10.0	Henry Osinde	v Kenya	Delhi	2011
4/57	10.0	Balaji Rao	v Zimbabwe	Nagpur	2011
3/15	10.0	John Davison	v Kenya	Cape Town	2003
3/35	8.0	Harvir Baidwan	v Pakistan	Colombo	2011
Last updated: 16 March 2011

== See also ==
- Canada national cricket team
- Cricket in Canada
