= List of Cricket World Cup five-wicket hauls =

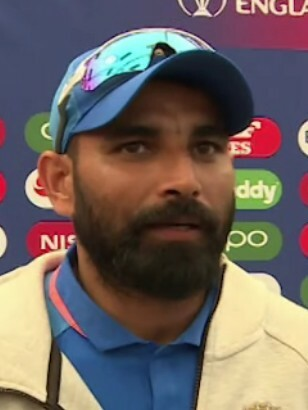
Mohammed Shami has the most five-wicket hauls (four) across all World Cup tournaments.

In cricket, a five-wicket haul (also known as a "five–for" or "fifer") refers to a bowler taking five or more wickets in a single innings. This is regarded by the critics as a notable achievement, and there have been only 71 instances of a bowler taking a five-wicket haul in World Cup tournaments. The Cricket World Cup is the international championship of One Day International (ODI) cricket. The event is organised by the sport's governing body, the International Cricket Council (ICC), and is held once in every four years. (Note: The teams are Australia, England, New Zealand, Pakistan, West Indies, India, Sri Lanka, Zimbabwe, Bangladesh and South Africa.) In addition, players from four associate members of the ICC have taken five-wicket hauls in World Cups. (Note: The members include Canada, Kenya, Namibia and the United Arab Emirates.)

Starting with the inaugural edition in 1975, a total of 59 players have taken five-wicket haul in the championship as of 2023. Australia's Dennis Lillee became the first player take a five-wicket haul when he took five wickets for 34 runs against Pakistan in the third match of the world cup. His compatriot Gary Gilmour picked up two consecutive five-wicket hauls—in the semi-final against England and the final against West Indies—in the edition. The first of the two, six wickets for 14 runs, was named the "Best Bowling Performance" in ODIs in an all-time list released by the Wisden in 2002. Joel Garner is the only other player to take a five-wicket haul in a World Cup final. He took five wickets for 38 runs against England in the 1979 tournament final; the performance ensured West Indies' victory and helped them retain the title.

The 1992 edition was the only tournament where no five-wicket hauls were taken, while the 2003 tournament had a record 12 five-wicket hauls taken by 11 different players. Indian Mohammed Shami has taken four and Australia's Mitchell Starc has taken three five-wicket hauls while seven others—Gilmour, Ashantha de Mel, Glenn McGrath, Vasbert Drakes, Shahid Afridi, Mustafizur Rahman, Shaheen Afridi —have taken two in the history of the tournament. McGrath's seven wickets for 15 runs against Namibia remains the best bowling figures World Cup matches.

== Key ==
- Inn – The innings of the match in which the five-wicket haul was taken
- Overs – Overs bowled in the innings
- Runs – Runs conceded in the innings
- Wkts – Batsmen whose wickets were taken in the innings
- Econ – Runs conceded per over
- Won – The match was won by the bowler's team
- Lost – The match was lost by the bowler's team
- Tied – The match ended in a tie
- † – One of two five-wicket hauls in the match
- ‡ – Best bowling figures in World Cup up to that point

== Five-wicket hauls ==
Cricket World Cup five-wicket hauls
No.	Bowler	Date	Team	Opponent	Venue	Inn	Overs	Runs	Wkts	Econ	Batsmen	Result
1	Dennis Lillee	7 June 1975	Australia	Pakistan	Headingley, Leeds	2	12	34	5 ‡	2.83	Sadiq Mohammad; Asif Iqbal; Sarfraz Nawaz; Wasim Bari; Asif Masood	Won
2	Gary Gilmour	18 June 1975	Australia	England	Headingley, Leeds	1	12	14	6 ‡	1.16	Dennis Amiss; Barry Wood; Keith Fletcher; Tony Greig; Frank Hayes; Alan Knott	Won
3	Gary Gilmour (2)	21 June 1975	Australia	West Indies	Lord's Cricket Ground, London	1	12	48	5	4.00	Alvin Kallicharran; Rohan Kanhai; Clive Lloyd; Vivian Richards; Deryck Murray	Lost
4	Alan Hurst	16 June 1979	Australia	Canada	Edgbaston Cricket Ground, Birmingham	1	10	21	5	2.10	Christopher Chappell; Franklyn Dennis; Charles Baksh; Robert Callender; Cornelius Henry	Won
5	Joel Garner	23 June 1979	West Indies	England	Lord's Cricket Ground, London	2	11	38	5	3.45	Graham Gooch; David Gower; Wayne Larkins; Chris Old; Bob Taylor	Won
6	Vic Marks	11 June 1983	England	Sri Lanka	County Ground, Taunton	2	12	39	5	3.25	Sidath Wettimuny; Duleep Mendis; Ranjan Madugalle; Arjuna Ranatunga; Somachandra de Silva	Won
7	Winston Davis	11 June 1983	West Indies	Australia	Headingley, Leeds	2	10.3	51	7 ‡	4.85	Kim Hughes; David Hookes; Graham Yallop; Allan Border; Ken MacLeay; Geoff Lawson; Dennis Lillee	Won
8	Richard Hadlee	13 June 1983	New Zealand	Sri Lanka	County Ground, Bristol	1	10.1	25	5	2.45	Sidath Wettimuny; Duleep Mendis; Arjuna Ranatunga; Ashantha de Mel; Rumesh Ratnayake	Won
9	Kapil Dev	13 June 1983 †	India	Australia	Trent Bridge, Nottingham	1	12	43	5	3.58	Kepler Wessels; Rod Marsh; Ken MacLeay; Tom Hogan; Geoff Lawson	Lost
10	Ken MacLeay	13 June 1983 †	Australia	India	Trent Bridge, Nottingham	2	11.5	39	6	3.29	Dilip Vengsarkar; Sandip Patil; Yashpal Sharma; Madan Lal; Roger Binny; Syed Kirmani	Won
11	Ashantha de Mel	16 June 1983 †	Sri Lanka	Pakistan	Headingley, Leeds	1	12	39	5	3.25	Mohsin Khan; Mansoor Akhtar; Zaheer Abbas; Shahid Mahboob; Sarfraz Nawaz	Lost
12	Abdul Qadir	16 June 1983 †	Pakistan	Sri Lanka	Headingley, Leeds	2	12	44	5	3.66	Roy Dias; Duleep Mendis; Rumesh Ratnayake; Arjuna Ranatunga; Guy de Alwis	Won
13	Ashantha de Mel (2)	18 June 1983	Sri Lanka	New Zealand	County Ground, Derby	1	12	32	5	2.66	Glenn Turner; John Wright; Richard Hadlee; Warren Lees; Lance Cairns	Won
14	Craig McDermott	4 November 1987	Australia	Pakistan	Gaddafi Stadium, Lahore	2	10	44	5	4.40	Mansoor Akhtar; Wasim Akram; Saleem Yousuf; Saleem Jaffar; Tauseef Ahmed	Won
15	Paul Strang	27 February 1996	Zimbabwe	Kenya	Moin-ul-Haq Stadium, Patna	1	9.4	21	5	2.17	Maurice Odumbe; Tito Odumbe; Thomas Odoyo; Aasif Karim; Martin Suji	Won
16	Damien Fleming	27 February 1996	Australia	India	Wankhede stadium, Mumbai	2	9	36	5	4.00	Ajay Jadeja; Vinod Kambli; Mohammad Azharuddin; Anil Kumble; Javagal Srinath	Won
17	Shaukat Dukanwala	1 March 1996	United Arab Emirates	Netherlands	Gaddafi Stadium, Lahore	1	10	29	5	2.90	Flavian Aponso; Klaas-Jan van Noortwijk; Roland Lefebvre; Bas Zuiderent; Marcelis Schewe	Won
18	Lance Klusener	26 May 1999	South Africa	Kenya	VRA Cricket Ground, Amstelveen	1	8.3	21	5	2.47	Steve Tikolo; Alpesh Vadher; Thomas Odoyo; Mohammad Sheikh; Joseph Angara	Won
19	Robin Singh	26 May 1999	India	Sri Lanka	County Ground, Taunton	2	9.3	31	5	3.26	Aravinda de Silva; Arjuna Ranatunga; Chaminda Vaas; Eric Upashantha; Muttiah Muralitharan	Won
20	Glenn McGrath	30 May 1999	Australia	West Indies	Old Trafford, Manchester	1	8.4	14	5	1.61	Sherwin Campbell; Jimmy Adams; Brian Lara; Mervyn Dillon; Courtney Walsh	Won
21	Saqlain Mushtaq	31 May 1999	Pakistan	Bangladesh	County Ground, Northampton	1	10	35	5	3.50	Shahriar Hossain; Mehrab Hossain; Minhajul Abedin; Khaled Mahmud; Mohammad Rafique	Lost
22	Venkatesh Prasad	8 June 1999	India	Pakistan	Old Trafford, Manchester	2	9.3	27	5	2.84	Saeed Anwar; Salim Malik; Inzamam-ul-Haq; Moin Khan; Wasim Akram	Won
23	Shaun Pollock	17 June 1999	South Africa	Australia	Edgbaston Cricket Ground, Birmingham	1	9.2	36	5	3.85	Mark Waugh; Steve Waugh; Michael Bevan; Tom Moody; Shane Warne	Tied
24	Austin Codrington	11 February 2003	Canada	Bangladesh	Kingsmead Cricket Ground, Durban	2	9	27	5	3.00	Hannan Sarkar; Alok Kapali; Mohammad Rafique; Tapash Baisya; Mashrafe Mortaza	Won
25	Chaminda Vaas	14 February 2003	Sri Lanka	Bangladesh	City Oval, Pietermaritzburg	1	9.1	25	6	2.72	Hannan Sarkar; Al Sahariar; Mohammad Ashraful; Ehsanul Haque; Sanwar Hossain; Mashrafe Mortaza	Won
26	Wasim Akram	16 February 2003	Pakistan	Namibia	De Beers Diamond Oval, Kimberley	2	9	28	5	3.11	Riaan Walters; Gavin Murgatroyd; Louis Burger; Deon Kotzé; Melt van Schoor	Won
27	Rudi van Vuuren	19 February 2003	Namibia	England	St George's Park, Port Elizabeth	1	10	43	5	4.30	Nick Knight; Michael Vaughan; Craig White; Ronnie Irani; Andy Caddick	Lost
28	Vasbert Drakes	23 February 2003	West Indies	Canada	SuperSport Park, Centurion	1	9.5	44	5	4.47	Ian Billcliff; Nicholas Ifill; Joe Harris; Austin Codrington; Barry Seebaran	Won
29	Collins Obuya	24 February 2003	Kenya	Sri Lanka	Gymkhana Club Ground, Nairobi	2	10	24	5	2.40	Hashan Tillakaratne; Aravinda de Silva; Mahela Jayawardene; Kumar Sangakkara; Chaminda Vaas	Won
30	Ashish Nehra	26 February 2003	India	England	Kingsmead Cricket Ground, Durban	2	10	23	6	2.30	Michael Vaughan; Nasser Hussain; Alec Stewart; Paul Collingwood; Craig White; Ronnie Irani	Won
31	Glenn McGrath (2)	27 February 2003	Australia	Namibia	Senwes Park, Potchefstroom	2	7	15	7 ‡	2.14	Jan-Berrie Burger; Morné Karg; Danie Keulder; Gavin Murgatroyd; Deon Kotzé; Louis Burger; Björn Kotzé	Won
32	Andy Bichel	2 March 2003	Australia	England	St George's Park, Port Elizabeth	1	10	20	7	2.00	Nick Knight; Michael Vaughan; Nasser Hussain; Alec Stewart; Paul Collingwood; Andrew Flintoff; Ashley Giles	Won
33	Vasbert Drakes (2)	4 March 2003	West Indies	Kenya	De Beers Diamond Oval, Kimberley	2	10	33	5	3.30	Kennedy Otieno; Brijal Patel; Steve Tikolo; Hitesh Modi; David Obuya	Won
34	Shane Bond	11 March 2003 †	New Zealand	Australia	St George's Park, Port Elizabeth	1	10	23	6	2.30	Adam Gilchrist; Matthew Hayden; Ricky Ponting; Damien Martyn; Brad Hogg; Ian Harvey	Lost
35	Brett Lee	11 March 2003 †	Australia	New Zealand	St George's Park, Port Elizabeth	2	9.1	42	5	4.58	Stephen Fleming; Brendon McCullum; Jacob Oram; Andre Adams; Shane Bond	Won
36	Charl Langeveldt	28 March 2007	South Africa	Sri Lanka	Providence Stadium, Guyana	1	10	39	5	3.90	Sanath Jayasuriya; Mahela Jayawardene; Russel Arnold; Farveez Maharoof; Chaminda Vaas	Won
37	André Nel	7 April 2007	South Africa	Bangladesh	Providence Stadium, Guyana	1	10	45	5	4.50	Javed Omar; Tamim Iqbal; Habibul Bashar; Mohammad Ashraful; Mashrafe Mortaza	Lost
38	Andrew Hall	17 April 2007	South Africa	England	Kensington Oval, Bridgetown	1	10	18	5	1.80	Paul Collingwood; Andrew Flintoff; Paul Nixon; Sajid Mahmood; James Anderson	Won
39	Shahid Afridi	23 February 2011	Pakistan	Kenya	Mahinda Rajapaksa International Cricket Stadium, Hambantota	2	8	16	5	2.00	Collins Obuya; Steve Tikolo; Tanmay Mishra; Jimmy Kamande; Thomas Odoyo	Won
40	Tim Bresnan	27 February 2011	England	India	M. Chinnaswamy Stadium, Bangalore	1	10	48	5	4.80	Virender Sehwag; Mahendra Singh Dhoni; Yusuf Pathan; Virat Kohli; Harbhajan Singh	Tied
41	Kemar Roach	28 February 2011	West Indies	Netherlands	Feroz Shah Kotla Ground, Delhi	2	8.3	27	6	3.17	Wesley Barresi; Bas Zuiderent; Mudassar Bukhari; Pieter Seelaar; Bernard Loots; Berend Westdijk	Won
42	Lasith Malinga	1 March 2011	Sri Lanka	Kenya	R. Premadasa Stadium, Colombo	1	7.4	38	6	4.95	Seren Waters; Collins Obuya; Tanmay Mishra; Peter Ongondo; Shem Ngoche; Elijah Otieno	Won
43	Shahid Afridi (2)	3 March 2011	Pakistan	Canada	R. Premadasa Stadium, Colombo	2	10	23	5	2.30	Ashish Bagai; Jimmy Hansra; Rizwan Cheema; Tyson Gordon; Harvir Baidwan	Won
44	Yuvraj Singh	6 March 2011	India	Ireland	M. Chinnaswamy Stadium, Bangalore	1	10	31	5	3.10	William Porterfield; Andrew White; Kevin O'Brien; Alex Cusack; John Mooney	Won
45	Dale Steyn	12 March 2011	South Africa	India	Vidarbha Cricket Association Stadium, Nagpur	1	9.4	50	5	5.17	Gautam Gambhir; Yusuf Pathan; Harbhajan Singh; Ashish Nehra; Munaf Patel	Won
46	Ravi Rampaul	20 March 2011	West Indies	India	M. A. Chidambaram Stadium, Chennai	1	10	51	5	5.10	Gautam Gambhir; Sachin Tendulkar; Virat Kohli; Yusuf Pathan; Zaheer Khan	Lost
47	Wahab Riaz	30 March 2011	Pakistan	India	Punjab Cricket Association Stadium, Mohali	1	10	46	5	4.60	Virender Sehwag; Virat Kohli; Yuvraj Singh; Mahendra Singh Dhoni; Zaheer Khan	Lost
48	Steven Finn	14 February 2015 †	England	Australia	Melbourne Cricket Ground, Melbourne	1	10	71	5	7.10	George Bailey; Mitchell Marsh; Brad Haddin; Glenn Maxwell; Mitchell Johnson	Lost
49	Mitchell Marsh	14 February 2015 †	Australia	England	Melbourne Cricket Ground, Melbourne	2	9	33	5	3.66	Gary Ballance; Ian Bell; Joe Root; Eoin Morgan; Jos Buttler	Won
50	Sohail Khan	15 February 2015	Pakistan	India	Adelaide Oval, Adelaide	1	10	55	5	5.55	Rohit Sharma; Virat Kohli; Suresh Raina; Mahendra Singh Dhoni; Ajinkya Rahane	Lost
51	Tim Southee	20 February 2015	New Zealand	England	Westpac Stadium, Wellington	1	9	33	7	3.66	Ian Bell; Moeen Ali; James Taylor; Jos Buttler; Chris Woakes; Stuart Broad; Steven Finn	Won
52	Imran Tahir	27 February 2015	South Africa	West Indies	Sydney Cricket Ground, Sydney	2	10	45	5	4.50	Dwayne Smith; Lendl Simmons; Darren Sammy; Andre Russell; Denesh Ramdin	Won
53	Trent Boult	28 February 2015 †	New Zealand	Australia	Eden Park, Auckland	1	10	27	5	2.70	Michael Clarke; Glenn Maxwell; Mitchell Marsh; Mitchell Johnson; Mitchell Starc	Won
54	Mitchell Starc	28 February 2015 †	Australia	New Zealand	Eden Park, Auckland	2	9	28	6	3.11	Martin Guptill; Ross Taylor; Grant Elliott; Luke Ronchi; Adam Milne; Tim Southee	Lost
55	Mitchell Starc (2)	6 June 2019	Australia	West Indies	Trent Bridge, Nottingham	2	10	46	5	4.60	Chris Gayle; Andre Russell; Carlos Brathwaite; Jason Holder; Sheldon Cottrell	Won
56	James Neesham	8 June 2019	New Zealand	Afghanistan	County Ground, Taunton	1	10	31	5	3.10	Hazratullah Zazai; Rahmat Shah; Gulbadin Naib; Mohammad Nabi; Najibullah Zadran	Won
57	Mohammad Amir	12 June 2019	Pakistan	Australia	County Ground, Taunton	1	10	30	5	3.00	Aaron Finch; Usman Khawaja; Shaun Marsh; Alex Carey; Mitchell Starc	Lost
58	Shakib Al Hasan	24 June 2019	Bangladesh	Afghanistan	Rose Bowl, Southampton	2	10	29	5	2.90	Rahmat Shah; Gulbadin Naib; Mohammad Nabi; Asghar Afghan; Najibullah Zadran	Won
59	Jason Behrendorff	25 June 2019	Australia	England	Lord's, London	2	10	44	5	4.40	James Vince; Jonny Bairstow; Moeen Ali; Chris Woakes; Jofra Archer	Won
60	Mitchell Starc (3)	29 June 2019	Australia	New Zealand	Lord's, London	2	9.4	26	5	2.68	Kane Williamson; Tom Latham; Ish Sodhi; Lockie Ferguson; Mitchell Santner	Won
61	Mohammed Shami	30 June 2019	India	England	Edgbaston Cricket Ground, Birmingham	1	10.0	69	5	6.90	Jonny Bairstow; Eoin Morgan; Joe Root; Jos Buttler; Chris Woakes	Lost
62	Mustafizur Rahman	2 July 2019	Bangladesh	India	Edgbaston Cricket Ground, Birmingham	1	10.0	59	5	5.90	Virat Kohli; Hardik Pandya; MS Dhoni; Dinesh Karthik; Mohammad Shami	Lost
63	Mustafizur Rahman (2)	5 July 2019 †	Bangladesh	Pakistan	Lord's, London	1	10.0	75	5	7.50	Imam-ul-Haq; Haris Sohail; Shadab Khan; Imad Wasim; Mohammad Amir	Lost
64	Shaheen Afridi	5 July 2019 †	Pakistan	Bangladesh	Lord's, London	2	9.1	35	6	3.81	Tamim Iqbal; Liton Das; Shakib Al Hasan; Mohammad Saifuddin; Mahmudullah; Mustafizur Rahman	Won
65	Mitchell Santner	9 October 2023	New Zealand	Netherlands	Rajiv Gandhi International Stadium, Hyderabad	2	10	59	5	5.90	Max O'Dowd; Colin Ackermann; Scott Edwards; Roelof van der Merwe; Ryan Klein	Won
66	Shaheen Afridi (2)	20 October 2023	Pakistan	Australia	M. Chinnaswamy Stadium, Bangalore	1	10.0	54	5	5.40	Mitchell Marsh; Glenn Maxwell; Marcus Stoinis; Mitchell Starc; Josh Hazlewood	Lost
67	Mohammed Shami (2)	22 October 2023	India	New Zealand	HPCA Stadium, Dharamshala	1	10.0	54	5	5.40	Will Young; Rachin Ravindra; Daryl Mitchell; Mitchell Santner; Matt Henry	Won
68	Dilshan Madushanka	2 November 2023 †	Sri Lanka	India	Wankhede Stadium, Mumbai	1	10	80	5	8.00	Rohit Sharma; Shubman Gill; Virat Kohli; Shreyas Iyer; Suryakumar Yadav	Lost
69	Mohammed Shami (3)	2 November 2023 †	India	Sri Lanka	Wankhede Stadium, Mumbai	2	5	18	5	3.60	Charith Asalanka; Angelo Mathews; Dushan Hemantha; Dushmantha Chameera; Kasun Rajitha	Won
70	Ravindra Jadeja	5 November 2023	India	South Africa	Eden Gardens, Kolkata	2	9	33	5	3.66	Temba Bavuma; Heinrich Klaasen; David Miller; Keshav Maharaj; Kagiso Rabada	Won
71	Mohammed Shami (4)	15 November 2023	India	New Zealand	Wankhede Stadium, Mumbai	2	9.5	57	7	5.79	Devon Conway; Rachin Ravindra; Kane Williamson; Daryl Mitchell; Tom Latham; Tim Southee; Lockie Ferguson	Won

== Bibliography ==
- Bhardwaj (2011). Study Package For Clat 2nd Edition. McGraw-Hill Education (India) Pvt Limited. ISBN 978-0-07-107468-1.
- Pervez, M.A. (2001). A Dictionary of Cricket. Universities Press. ISBN 978-81-7370-184-9.
