= 1979 Cricket World Cup squads =

This is a list of cricketers who represented their country at the 1979 Cricket World Cup in England which took place from 9 June 1979 to 23 June 1979. The oldest player at the 1979 Cricket World Cup was Garnet Brisbane (40) of Canada while the youngest player was Sudath Pasqual (17) of Sri Lanka.

== Australia ==
Player	Date of birth	Batting style	Bowling style	First class team
Kim Hughes (c)	26 January 1954	Right hand	Right arm medium	Western Australia
Allan Border	27 July 1955	Left hand	Left arm orthodox spin	Queensland
Gary Cosier	25 April 1953	Right hand	Right arm medium	South Australia
Rick Darling	1 May 1957	Right hand	–	South Australia
Geoff Dymock	21 July 1945	Left hand	Left arm fast-medium	Queensland
Andrew Hilditch	20 May 1956	Right hand	Right arm medium	South Australia
Rodney Hogg	5 March 1951	Right hand	Right hand fast	South Australia
Alan Hurst	15 July 1950	Right hand	Right arm fast	Victoria
Trevor Laughlin	30 January 1951	Left hand	Right arm medium	Victoria
Jeff Moss	29 June 1947	Left hand	–	Victoria
Graeme Porter	18 March 1955	Right hand	Right hand medium	Western Australia
Kevin Wright (wk)	27 December 1953	Right hand	Wicket-keeper	Western Australia
Graham Yallop	7 October 1952	Left hand	Left arm medium	Victoria
Dav Whatmore	16 March 1954	Right hand	-	Victoria

Source: Cricinfo 1979 World Cup stats for Australia

== Canada ==
Player	Date of birth	Batting style	Bowling style	First class team
Bryan Mauricette (c) (wk)	4 September 1946	Right hand	Wicket-keeper	(Canada) Toronto (Cricket West Indies) Windward Islands
Charles Baksh	15 March 1940	Right hand	–	(Canada) Winnipeg
Robert Callender	2 November 1950	Right hand	Right arm medium-fast	(Canada) Montreal
Christopher Chappell	17 July 1955	Right hand	–	(Canada) Toronto
Franklyn Dennis	26 September 1947	Right hand	–	(Canada) Toronto
Cornelius Henry	16 September 1956	Right hand	Right arm medium	(Canada) Ottawa
Tariq Javed	12 June 1949	Right hand	Right arm leg-break	(Canada) Ottawa (Pakistan) Karachi
Cecil Marshall	13 September 1939	Right hand	Right arm medium	(Canada) Ottawa
Jitendra Patel	26 November 1945	Left hand	Left arm orthodox spin	(Canada) London (Ontario) (India) Baroda
Glenroy Sealy	11 June 1940	Right hand	Right arm medium	(Canada) Toronto; Barbados
Martin Stead	1 June 1958	Right hand	Right arm medium	(Canada) Vancouver
John Valentine	20 September 1954	Left hand	Left arm medium	(Canada) Ottawa
John Vaughan	8 June 1945	Right hand	Right arm medium-fast	(Canada) Ottawa
Garnet Brisbane	31 December 1938	Right hand	Left arm orthodox spin	(Canada) Quebec

Source: Cricinfo 1979 World Cup stats for Canada

== England ==
Player	Date of birth	Batting style	Bowling style	First class team
Mike Brearley (c)	28 April 1942	Right hand	Wicket-keeper	(England) Middlesex
Ian Botham	24 November 1955	Right hand	Right arm fast-medium	(England) Somerset
Geoffrey Boycott	21 October 1940	Right hand	Right arm medium	(England) Yorkshire
Phil Edmonds	8 March 1951	Right hand	Left arm orthodox spin	(England) Middlesex
Mike Gatting	6 June 1957	Right hand	Right arm medium	(England) Middlesex
Graham Gooch	23 July 1953	Right hand	Right arm medium	(England) Essex
David Gower	1 April 1957	Left hand	Right arm off-break	(England) Leicestershire
Mike Hendrick	22 October 1948	Right hand	Right arm fast-medium	(England) Derbyshire
Wayne Larkins	22 November 1953	Right hand	Right arm medium	(England) Northamptonshire
Geoff Miller	8 September 1952	Right hand	Right arm off-break	(England) Derbyshire
Chris Old	22 December 1948	Left hand	Right arm fast-medium	(England) Yorkshire
Derek Randall	24 February 1951	Right hand	Right arm medium	(England) Nottinghamshire
Bob Taylor (wk)	17 July 1941	Right hand	Wicket-keeper	(England) Derbyshire
Bob Willis	30 May 1949	Right hand	Right arm fast	(England) Warwickshire

Source: Cricinfo 1979 World Cup stats for England

== India ==
Player	Date of birth	Batting style	Bowling style	First class team
Srinivasaraghavan Venkataraghavan (c)	21 April 1945	Right hand	Right arm offbreak	(India) Tamil Nadu
Mohinder Amarnath	24 September 1950	Right hand	Right arm medium	(India) Delhi
Bishan Singh Bedi	25 September 1946	Right hand	Left arm slow orthodox	(India) Delhi
Anshuman Gaekwad	23 September 1952	Right hand	Right arm offbreak	(India) Baroda
Sunil Gavaskar (vc)	10 July 1949	Right hand	Right arm medium Right arm offbreak	(India) Bombay
Karsan Ghavri	28 February 1951	Left hand	Left arm medium	(India) Bombay
Kapil Dev	6 January 1959	Right hand	Right arm fast-medium	(India) Haryana
Surinder Khanna (wk)	3 June 1956	Right hand	Wicket-keeper	(India) Delhi
Brijesh Patel	24 November 1952	Right hand	Right arm offbreak	(India) Karnataka
Dilip Vengsarkar	6 April 1956	Right hand	Right arm medium	(India) Bombay
Gundappa Viswanath	12 February 1949	Right hand	Right arm legbreak	(India) Karnataka
Bharath Reddy	12 November 1954	Right hand	Wicket-keeper	(India) Tamil Nadu
Yajurvindra Singh	1 August 1952	Right hand	Right arm medium	(India) Maharashtra
Yashpal Sharma	11 August 1954	Right hand	Right arm medium	(India) Punjab

Source: ESPNcricinfo

== New Zealand ==
Player	Date of birth	Batting style	Bowling style	First class team
Mark Burgess (c)	17 July 1944	Right hand	Right arm off-break	(New Zealand) Auckland
Lance Cairns	10 October 1949	Right hand	Right arm medium-fast	(New Zealand) Otago
Ewen Chatfield	3 July 1950	Right hand	Right arm medium-fast	(New Zealand) Wellington
Jeremy Coney	21 June 1952	Right hand	Right arm medium	(New Zealand) Wellington
Bruce Edgar	23 November 1956	Left hand	Wicket-keeper	(New Zealand) Wellington
Richard Hadlee	3 July 1951	Left hand	Right arm fast	(New Zealand) Canterbury
Geoff Howarth	29 March 1951	Right hand	Right arm offbreak	(New Zealand) Auckland
Warren Lees (wk)	19 March 1952	Right hand	Wicket-keeper	(New Zealand) Otago
Brian McKechnie	6 November 1953	Right hand	Right arm fast-medium	(New Zealand) Otago
John Morrison	27 August 1947	Right hand	Left arm orthodox spin	(New Zealand) Wellington
Warren Stott	8 December 1946	Right hand	Right arm medium	(New Zealand) Auckland
Gary Troup	3 October 1952	Right hand	Left arm fast-medium	(New Zealand) Auckland
Glenn Turner	26 May 1947	Right hand	Right arm offbreak	(New Zealand) Otago
John Wright	5 July 1954	Left hand	Right arm medium	(New Zealand) Northern Districts

Source: Cricinfo 1979 World Cup stats for New Zealand

== Pakistan ==
Player	Date of birth	Batting style	Bowling style	First class team
Asif Iqbal (c)	6 June 1943	Right hand	Right arm medium	(Pakistan) Karachi
Zaheer Abbas	24 July 1947	Right hand	Right arm offbreak	(Pakistan) Karachi
Sikander Bakht	25 August 1957	Right hand	Right arm medium-fast	(Pakistan) Karachi
Wasim Bari (wk)	23 March 1948	Right hand	Wicket-keeper	(Pakistan) Karachi
Imran Khan	25 November 1952	Right hand	Right arm fast	(Pakistan) PIA
Majid Khan	28 September 1946	Right hand	Right arm medium Right arm offbreak	(Pakistan) Rawalpindi
Javed Miandad	12 June 1957	Right hand	Right arm legbreak	(Pakistan) Habib Bank
Sadiq Mohammad	3 May 1945	Left hand	Right arm legbreak	(Pakistan) Karachi
Sarfraz Nawaz	1 December 1948	Right hand	Right arm fast-medium	(Pakistan) Lahore
Mudassar Nazar	6 April 1956	Right hand	Right arm medium	(Pakistan) Lahore
Wasim Raja	3 July 1952	Left hand	Right arm legbreak	(Pakistan) Lahore
Haroon Rashid	25 March 1953	Right hand	Right arm medium	(Pakistan) Karachi
Iqbal Qasim	6 August 1953	Left hand	Left arm orthodox spin	(Pakistan) Karachi
Hasan Jamil	25 July 1952	Left hand	Left arm medium	(Pakistan) PIA

Source: Cricinfo 1979 World Cup stats for Pakistan

== Sri Lanka ==
Player	Date of birth	Batting style	Bowling style	First class team
Anura Tennekoon (c)	29 October 1946	Right hand	Left arm orthodox spin	(Sri Lanka) SSC
Ajit de Silva	12 December 1952	Left hand	Left arm orthodox spin	(Sri Lanka) BCAC
Somachandra de Silva	11 June 1942	Right hand	Right arm legbreak	(Sri Lanka) BCAC
Stanley de Silva	17 November 1956	Right hand	Right arm fast-medium	(Sri Lanka) –
Roy Dias	18 October 1952	Right hand	Right-arm offbreak	(Sri Lanka) CCC
Ranjan Gunatilleke	15 August 1951	Right hand	Right-arm medium	(Sri Lanka) –
Sunil Jayasinghe (wk)	15 July 1955	Right hand	None	(Sri Lanka) BCAC
Ranjan Madugalle	22 April 1959	Right hand	Right-arm offbreak	(England) FFCC
Duleep Mendis	25 August 1952	Right hand	–	(Sri Lanka) SSC
Tony Opatha	5 August 1947	Right hand	Right arm medium	(Sri Lanka) CCC
Sudath Pasqual	16 October 1961	Left-hand	Right-arm medium	(Sri Lanka) RCC
Bandula Warnapura (vc)	1 March 1953	Right hand	Right arm medium	(Sri Lanka) BCAC (Sri Lanka) BRC
Sunil Wettimuny	2 February 1949	Right hand	Wicket-keeper	(Sri Lanka) SSC
Rohan Jayasekara	7 December 1957	Right hand	Wicket-keeper	(Sri Lanka) -

Source: Cricinfo 1979 World Cup stats for Sri Lanka

== West Indies ==
Manager: Clyde Walcott

Player	Date of birth	Batting style	Bowling style	First class team
Clive Lloyd (c)	31 August 1944	left hand	Right-arm medium	Guyana
Colin Croft	15 March 1953	Right-hand	Right-arm fast	Guyana
Joel Garner	16 December 1952	Right hand	Right-arm fast	Barbados
Gordon Greenidge	1 May 1951	Right-hand	Right-arm medium/offbreak	Barbados
Desmond Haynes	15 February 1956	Right-hand	Right-arm legbreak/medium pace	Barbados
Michael Holding	16 February 1954	Right-hand	Right-arm fast	Jamaica
Alvin Kallicharran	21 March 1949	Left-hand	Right-arm offbreak	Guyana
Collis King	11 June 1951	Right-hand	Right-arm medium	Barbados
Deryck Murray (wk)	20 May 1943	Right-hand	Legbreak	Trinidad and Tobago
Viv Richards	7 March 1952	Right-hand	Right-arm medium/offbreak	(Antigua and Barbuda) Leeward Islands
Andy Roberts	29 January 1951	Right-hand	Right-arm fast	(Antigua and Barbuda) Leeward Islands
Larry Gomes	13 July 1953	Left-hand	Right-arm offbreak	Trinidad and Tobago
Faoud Bacchus	31 January 1954	Right-hand	Right-arm medium	Guyana
Malcolm Marshall	18 April 1958	Right-hand	Right-arm fast	Barbados

Source: Cricinfo 1979 World Cup stats for West Indies
