= 2011 Cricket Canada Summer Festival =

- Administrator: Cricket Canada
- Cricket format: Twenty20
- Tournament format: round robin
- Host: Canada
- Champions: Trinidad and Tobago
- Participants: 4
- Matches: 6

The 2011 Cricket Canada Summer Festival was a cricket tournament in Canada, taking place between 11–13 August 2011. (Afghanistan, Canada, Trinidad and Tobago, and the USA were the four teams that participated in the round-robin tournament.

The competition was won by Trinidad and Tobago after they defeated Canada in the final match.

== Teams ==
There were 4 teams that played in the tournament.

- Afghanistan
- Canada
- Trinidad and Tobago
- United States

== Squads ==
Afghanistan	Canada	Trinidad and Tobago	United States
Nawroz Mangal (captain) Mohammad Nabi (vice-captain); Asghar Stanikzai; Dawlat Zadran; Gulbudeen Naib; Hamid Hassan; Hamza Hotak; Izatullah Dawlatzai; Karim Sadiq; Mirwais Ashraf; Mohammad Shahzad; Noor Ali Zadran; Samiullah Shenwari; Shabir Noori; Shapoor Zadran	Jimmy Hansra (captain); Harvir Baidwan; Khurram Chohan; Rustam Bhatti; Parth Desai; Tyson Gordon; Ruvindu Gunasekera; Hamza Tariq (wicketkeeper); Junaid Siddiqui; Henry Osinde; Hiral Patel; Rizwan Cheema; Zubin Surkari; Usman Limbada	Daren Ganga (captain) Samuel Badree; Adrian Barath; Rayad Emrit; Sherwin Ganga; Justin Guillen; Aneil Kanhai; Richard Kelly; Imran Khan; Dave Mohammed; Jason Mohammed; William Perkins; Denesh Ramdin; Navin Stewart	George Adams Quasen Alfred; Jignesh Desai; Akeem Dodson; Bhim George; Hussain Haidar; Stu Mills; Andy Mohammed; Muhammad Ghous; Amir Nanjee; Japen Patel; Samarth Shah; Charan Singh; Anand Tummala

== Group stage ==
=== Points table ===
Pos	Team	Pld	W	L	T	NR	Pts	NRR
1	Trinidad and Tobago	3	2	1	0	0	4	1.737
2	Afghanistan	3	2	1	0	0	4	1.367
3	Canada	3	2	1	0	0	4	0.833
4	United States	3	0	3	0	0	0	−3.850

Source: Source

=== Results ===
11 August 2011
Scorecard

Afghanistan; 138 (19.5 overs)	v	Trinidad and Tobago; 103 (18.4 overs)
Nawroz Mangal 78 (47); Sherwin Ganga 5/15 (3.5 overs)		Adrian Barath 30 (36); Shapoor Zadran 3/23 (3 overs)

Afghanistan won by 35 runs
Maple Leaf North-West Ground, King City, Ontario
Umpires: Harry Grewal & Shantikumar Milroy Kantharatnam (both CAN)
Player of the match: Nawroz Mangal

- Sherwin Ganga took a hat-trick with the wickets of Hamid Hassan, Shapoor Zadran and Hamza Hotak
- Points: Afghanistan 2, Trinidad and Tobago 0.

11 August 2011
Scorecard

Canada; 158/5 (20 overs)	v	United States; 86/7 (20 overs)
Hamza Tariq 61* (27); Anand Tummala 2/10 (3 overs)		Jignesh Desai 34 (48); Rizwan Cheema 2/9 (3 overs)

Canada won by 72 runs
Maple Leaf North-West Ground, King City, Ontario
Umpires: Hafeez Rehman & Shantikumar Milroy Kantharatnam (both CAN)
Player of the match: Hamza Tariq

- Points: Canada 2, United States 0.

12 August 2011
Scorecard

Afghanistan; 140/9 (20 overs)	v	Canada; 141/6 (20 overs)
Mohammad Shahzad 31 (37); Hiral Patel 3/2 (1 over)		Hiral Patel 33 (29); Hamza Tariq 33* (18); Mohammad Nabi 3/11 (4 overs)

Canada won by 4 wickets
Maple Leaf North-West Ground, King City, Ontario
Umpires: Ashook Brijcoomar and Harry Grewal (both CAN)
Player of the match: Hamza Tariq

- Points: Canada 2, Afghanistan 0.

12 August 2011
Scorecard

Trinidad and Tobago; 207/7 (20 overs)	v	United States; 96/9 (20 overs)
Jason Mohammed 87 (44); Jignesh Desai 3/31 (3 overs)		Amir Nanjee 33 (31); Imran Khan 4/18 (4 overs)

Trinidad and Tobago won by 111 runs
Maple Leaf North-West Ground, King City, Ontario
Umpires: Ashook Brijcoomar and Hafeez Rehman
Player of the match: Jason Mohammed

- Points: Trinidad and Tobago 2, United States 0.

13 August 2011
5th match

Afghanistan; 164 (20 overs)	v	United States; 116 (19.5 overs)
Gulbodin Naib 75 (38 balls); Bhim George 25/3 (3.1 overs)		Quasen Alfred 24 (20 balls); Hamid Hassan 3/18 (4 overs)

Afghanistan won by 48 runs
Maple Leaf North-West Ground, King City, Ontario
Umpires: Hafeez Rehman and Arnold Ramanjulu
Player of the match: Gulbodin Naib (Afghanistan)

- Afghanistan won the toss and chose to bat.

13 August 2011
6th match

Canada; 111 (20 overs)	v	Trinidad and Tobago; 113 (20 overs)
Jimmy Hansra 24 (31 balls); Samuel Badree 2/8 (4 overs)		Adrian Barath 68* (54 balls); Rizwan Cheema 1/17 (3 overs)

Trinidad & Tobago won by 7 wickets
Maple Leaf North-West Ground, King City, Ontario
Umpires: Harry Grewal and Arnold Ramanjulu
Player of the match: Adrian Barath (Trinidad & Tobago)

- Canada won the toss and chose to bat.
