= List of Canada ODI cricketers =

This is a list of Canadian One-day International cricketers. A One Day International, or an ODI, is an international cricket match between two representative teams, each having ODI status, as determined by the International Cricket Council (ICC). An ODI differs from Test matches in that the number of overs per team is limited, and that each team has only one innings. The list is arranged in the order in which each player won his first ODI cap. Where more than one player won his first ODI cap in the same match, those players are listed alphabetically by surname.

== Key ==
General

- ‡ – Captain
- † – Wicket-keeper
- First – Year of debut
- Last – Year of latest game
- Mat – Number of matches played
- Win% – Winning percentage

Batting

- Runs – Runs scored in career
- HS – Highest score
- Avg – Runs scored per dismissal
- * – Batsman remained not out

Bowling

- Balls – Balls bowled in career
- Wkt – Wickets taken in career
- BBI – Best bowling in an innings
- Ave – Average runs per wicket

Fielding

- Ca – Catches taken
- St – Stumpings taken

== Players ==
Statistics are correct as of 17 October 2026.

Canada ODI cricketers
| General | | | | | Batting | | | | | Bowling | | | | | Fielding | | Ref |
| No. | Name | First | Last | Mat | Runs | HS | Avg | 50 | 100 | Balls | Wkt | BBI | Ave | 5WI | Ca | St | Ref |
|---|---|---|---|---|---|---|---|---|---|---|---|---|---|---|---|---|---|
| 1 | Christopher Chappell | 1979 | 1979 | 3 | 38 | 19 | 12.66 | 0 | 0 | – | – | – | – | – | 0 | 0 | |
| 2 | Franklyn Dennis | 1979 | 1979 | 3 | 47 | 25 | 15.66 | 0 | 0 | – | – | – | – | – | 0 | 0 | |
| 3 | Cornelius Henry | 1979 | 1979 | 2 | 6 | 5 | 6.00 | 0 | 0 | 90 | 2 | 2/27 | 26.50 | 0 | 0 | 0 | |
| 4 | Cecil Marshall | 1979 | 1979 | 2 | 10 | 8 | 5.00 | 0 | 0 | – | – | – | – | – | 0 | 0 | |
| 5 | Bryan Mauricette ‡† | 1979 | 1979 | 3 | 20 | 15 | 6.66 | 0 | 0 | – | – | – | – | – | 0 | 0 | |
| 6 | Jitendra Patel | 1979 | 1979 | 3 | 3 | 2 | 1.00 | 0 | 0 | 91 | 0 | – | – | – | 0 | 0 | |
| 7 | Glenroy Sealy | 1979 | 1979 | 3 | 73 | 45 | 24.33 | 0 | 0 | 36 | 0 | – | – | – | 0 | 0 | |
| 8 | Martin Stead | 1979 | 1979 | 2 | 10 | 10 | 5.00 | 0 | 0 | 29 | 0 | – | – | – | 0 | 0 | |
| 9 | Tariq Javed | 1979 | 1979 | 3 | 15 | 8 | 5.00 | 0 | 0 | – | – | – | – | – | 0 | 0 | |
| 10 | John Valentine | 1979 | 1979 | 3 | 3 | 3* | – | 0 | 0 | 114 | 3 | 1/18 | 22.00 | 0 | 1 | 0 | |
| 11 | John Vaughan | 1979 | 1979 | 3 | 30 | 29 | 10.00 | 0 | 0 | 66 | 0 | – | – | – | 0 | 0 | |
| 12 | Robert Callender | 1979 | 1979 | 2 | 0 | 0 | 0.00 | 0 | 0 | 54 | 1 | 1/14 | 26.00 | 0 | 0 | 0 | |
| 13 | Charles Baksh | 1979 | 1979 | 1 | 0 | 0 | 0.00 | 0 | 0 | – | – | – | – | – | 0 | 0 | |
| 14 | Ashish Bagai ‡† | 2003 | 2013 | 62 | 1,964 | 137* | 37.76 | 16 | 2 | – | – | – | – | – | 59 | 9 | |
| 15 | Ian Billcliff | 2003 | 2009 | 19 | 529 | 93 | 27.84 | 4 | 0 | – | – | – | – | – | 7 | 0 | |
| 16 | Desmond Chumney | 2003 | 2007 | 21 | 397 | 48 | 20.89 | 0 | 0 | – | – | – | – | – | 2 | 0 | |
| 17 | Austin Codrington | 2003 | 2007 | 9 | 47 | 16 | 5.87 | 0 | 0 | 300 | 10 | 5/27 | 26.50 | 1 | 0 | 0 | |
| 18 | John Davison ‡ | 2003 | 2011 | 32 | 799 | 111 | 26.63 | 5 | 1 | 1,435 | 36 | 3/15 | 29.63 | 0 | 17 | 0 | |
| 19 | Nicholas de Groot | 2003 | 2003 | 6 | 44 | 17 | 7.33 | 0 | 0 | 81 | 3 | 2/45 | 29.33 | 0 | 0 | 0 | |
| 20 | Joseph Harris ‡ | 2003 | 2003 | 6 | 91 | 31 | 15.16 | 0 | 0 | – | – | – | – | – | 1 | 0 | |
| 21 | Davis Joseph | 2003 | 2003 | 4 | 13 | 9* | – | 0 | 0 | 186 | 5 | 2/42 | 34.00 | 0 | 0 | 0 | |
| 22 | Ishwar Maraj | 2003 | 2003 | 6 | 98 | 53* | 19.60 | 0 | 0 | 27 | 0 | – | – | – | 2 | 0 | |
| 23 | Abdul Sattaur | 2003 | 2003 | 3 | 20 | 13 | 6.66 | 0 | 0 | – | – | – | – | – | 2 | 0 | |
| 24 | Sanjayan Thuraisingam | 2003 | 2008 | 10 | 45 | 13 | 6.42 | 0 | 0 | 421 | 13 | 4/35 | 23.46 | 0 | 4 | 0 | |
| 25 | Barry Seebaran | 2003 | 2003 | 4 | 4 | 4* | 4.00 | 0 | 0 | 108 | 1 | 1/61 | 130.00 | 0 | 1 | 0 | |
| 26 | Nicholas Ifill | 2003 | 2003 | 4 | 16 | 9 | 5.33 | 0 | 0 | 72 | 0 | – | – | – | 2 | 0 | |
| 27 | Ashish Patel | 2003 | 2003 | 2 | 25 | 25 | 25.00 | 0 | 0 | 60 | 3 | 3/41 | 24.33 | 0 | 0 | 0 | |
| 28 | Abdool Samad | 2003 | 2009 | 27 | 740 | 130 | 29.60 | 2 | 1 | 235 | 7 | 1/8 | 40.14 | 0 | 9 | 0 | |
| 29 | Geoff Barnett | 2006 | 2010 | 22 | 455 | 77 | 20.68 | 1 | 0 | – | – | – | – | – | 7 | 0 | |
| 30 | Umar Bhatti ‡ | 2006 | 2010 | 36 | 378 | 46 | 17.18 | 0 | 0 | 1,630 | 33 | 4/45 | 34.81 | 0 | 5 | 0 | |
| 31 | Sunil Dhaniram ‡ | 2006 | 2010 | 44 | 915 | 92 | 24.72 | 6 | 0 | 1,769 | 41 | 5/32 | 30.24 | 1 | 8 | 0 | |
| 32 | Haninder Dhillon | 2006 | 2006 | 2 | 14 | 13 | 7.00 | 0 | 0 | – | – | – | – | – | 0 | 0 | |
| 33 | Stewart Heaney | 2006 | 2006 | 4 | 41 | 19 | 10.25 | 0 | 0 | – | – | – | – | – | 3 | 0 | |
| 34 | Henry Osinde | 2006 | 2013 | 42 | 64 | 21* | 4.26 | 0 | 0 | 1,692 | 45 | 4/26 | 30.86 | 0 | 11 | 0 | |
| 35 | Kevin Sandher | 2006 | 2007 | 15 | 35 | 12 | 5.83 | 0 | 0 | 696 | 18 | 3/24 | 31.61 | 0 | 1 | 0 | |
| 36 | George Codrington ‡ | 2006 | 2007 | 17 | 235 | 45* | 19.58 | 0 | 0 | 731 | 16 | 4/33 | 36.06 | 0 | 6 | 0 | |
| 37 | Don Maxwell | 2006 | 2007 | 10 | 166 | 59 | 27.66 | 1 | 0 | 72 | 1 | 1/23 | 70.00 | 0 | 0 | 0 | |
| 38 | Qaiser Ali ‡ | 2006 | 2008 | 17 | 244 | 70 | 15.25 | 2 | 0 | 182 | 5 | 3/28 | 26.40 | 0 | 5 | 0 | |
| 39 | Sandeep Jyoti | 2006 | 2010 | 14 | 264 | 117 | 22.00 | 0 | 1 | 120 | 1 | 1/26 | 90.00 | 0 | 4 | 0 | |
| 40 | Surendra Seeraj † | 2006 | 2006 | 1 | 13 | 13* | – | 0 | 0 | – | – | – | – | – | 2 | 0 | |
| 41 | Durand Soraine | 2006 | 2012 | 4 | 14 | 6 | 3.50 | 0 | 0 | 113 | 3 | 2/57 | 31.33 | 0 | 1 | 0 | |
| 42 | Steven Welsh | 2006 | 2008 | 3 | 41 | 32 | 20.50 | 0 | 0 | 120 | 0 | – | – | – | 1 | 0 | |
| 43 | Asif Mulla † | 2006 | 2009 | 24 | 482 | 58 | 20.08 | 1 | 0 | – | – | – | – | – | 9 | 5 | |
| 44 | Anderson Cummins | 2007 | 2007 | 13 | 27 | 9* | 4.50 | 0 | 0 | 624 | 6 | 3/60 | 48.53 | 0 | 3 | 0 | (Note: Anderson Cummins has also played One Day International cricket for the West Indies. Only his record for Canada is given above.) |
| 45 | Trevin Bastiampillai | 2007 | 2014 | 13 | 175 | 49 | 13.46 | 0 | 0 | 24 | 0 | – | – | – | 1 | 0 | |
| 46 | Mohsin Mulla | 2007 | 2007 | 1 | 1 | 1 | 1.00 | 0 | 0 | 60 | 0 | – | – | – | 0 | 0 | |
| 47 | Shahzad Khan | 2007 | 2007 | 1 | 4 | 4 | 4.00 | 0 | 0 | – | – | – | – | – | 0 | 0 | |
| 48 | Abdul Jabbar | 2007 | 2007 | 2 | 59 | 44 | 29.50 | 0 | 0 | – | – | – | – | – | 1 | 0 | |
| 49 | Calvert Hooper | 2007 | 2010 | 5 | 49 | 27 | 16.33 | 0 | 0 | 169 | 3 | 1/17 | 60.33 | 0 | 1 | 0 | |
| 50 | Arvind Kandappah | 2007 | 2007 | 2 | 97 | 69* | 97.00 | 1 | 0 | 4 | 0 | – | – | – | 0 | 0 | |
| 51 | Mohammad Iqbal | 2007 | 2008 | 5 | 54 | 30 | 10.80 | 0 | 0 | – | – | – | – | – | 0 | 0 | |
| 52 | Jason Patraj | 2007 | 2007 | 2 | 21 | 20 | 10.50 | 0 | 0 | 90 | 2 | 1/27 | 38.00 | 0 | 1 | 0 | |
| 53 | Aftab Shamshudeen | 2007 | 2007 | 1 | 3 | 3 | 3.00 | 0 | 0 | 18 | 0 | – | – | – | 0 | 0 | |
| 54 | Harvir Baidwan | 2008 | 2014 | 32 | 220 | 33 | 14.66 | 0 | 0 | 1,551 | 44 | 3/19 | 30.63 | 0 | 9 | 0 | |
| 55 | Zubin Surkari ‡ | 2008 | 2011 | 23 | 328 | 49 | 17.26 | 0 | 0 | – | – | – | – | – | 6 | 0 | |
| 56 | Sami Faridi | 2008 | 2008 | 3 | 19 | 16 | 9.50 | 0 | 0 | 60 | 0 | – | – | – | 0 | 0 | |
| 57 | Ruvindu Gunasekera | 2008 | 2014 | 19 | 455 | 72 | 23.94 | 6 | 0 | – | – | – | – | – | 7 | 0 | |
| 58 | Eion Katchay | 2008 | 2009 | 5 | 23 | 12 | 11.50 | 0 | 0 | 174 | 4 | 3/39 | 35.75 | 0 | 0 | 0 | |
| 59 | Manoj David | 2008 | 2010 | 4 | 82 | 48 | 27.33 | 0 | 0 | 96 | 2 | 2/30 | 37.00 | 0 | 0 | 0 | |
| 60 | Karun Jethi | 2008 | 2008 | 3 | 87 | 46* | 43.50 | 0 | 0 | 102 | 2 | 2/39 | 42.50 | 0 | 0 | 0 | |
| 61 | Rizwan Cheema ‡ | 2008 | 2013 | 33 | 764 | 94 | 24.64 | 6 | 0 | 1330 | 32 | 3/25 | 34.21 | 0 | 15 | 0 | |
| 62 | Balaji Rao | 2008 | 2011 | 10 | 59 | 24 | 7.37 | 0 | 0 | 474 | 12 | 4/57 | 37.33 | 0 | 3 | 0 | |
| 63 | Khurram Chohan | 2009 | 2014 | 25 | 165 | 35* | 12.69 | 0 | 0 | 1,186 | 36 | 5/68 | 28.58 | 1 | 3 | 0 | |
| 64 | Shaheed Keshvani | 2009 | 2009 | 5 | 21 | 17 | 10.50 | 0 | 0 | 48 | 0 | – | – | – | 1 | 0 | |
| 65 | Zameer Zahir | 2009 | 2009 | 1 | 3 | 3* | – | 0 | 0 | 30 | 2 | 2/35 | 17.50 | 0 | 0 | 0 | |
| 66 | Hiral Patel | 2009 | 2013 | 23 | 468 | 62 | 21.27 | 2 | 0 | 409 | 10 | 4/28 | 35.30 | 0 | 7 | 0 | |
| 67 | Jawad Dawood † | 2009 | 2009 | 2 | 25 | 25* | – | 0 | 0 | – | – | – | – | – | 0 | 0 | |
| 68 | Usman Limbada | 2010 | 2014 | 11 | 189 | 50 | 18.90 | 1 | 0 | – | – | – | – | – | 4 | 0 | |
| 69 | Nitish Kumar | 2010 | 2014 | 16 | 217 | 38 | 15.50 | 0 | 0 | 66 | 2 | 2/40 | 31.50 | 0 | 7 | 0 | |
| 70 | Parth Desai | 2010 | 2014 | 13 | 8 | 3* | 2.66 | 0 | 0 | 612 | 12 | 3/35 | 40.41 | 0 | 2 | 0 | |
| 71 | Jimmy Hansra ‡ | 2010 | 2014 | 24 | 421 | 70* | 23.38 | 2 | 0 | 445 | 7 | 3/27 | 59.00 | 0 | 7 | 0 | |
| 72 | Tyson Gordon | 2011 | 2011 | 5 | 27 | 9 | 5.40 | 0 | 0 | 15 | 0 | – | – | – | 2 | 0 | |
| 73 | Karl Whatham | 2011 | 2011 | 1 | 18 | 18 | 18.00 | 0 | 0 | – | – | – | – | – | 0 | 0 | |
| 74 | Hamza Tariq † | 2011 | 2026 | 11 | 236 | 71 | 23.60 | 1 | 0 | – | – | – | – | – | 7 | 3 | |
| 75 | Junaid Siddiqui | 2011 | 2024 | 11 | 74 | 25 | 10.57 | 0 | 0 | 503 | 5 | 1/20 | 74.20 | 0 | 3 | 0 | |
| 76 | Rustam Bhatti † | 2011 | 2011 | 1 | 3 | 3* | – | 0 | 0 | – | – | – | – | – | 2 | 0 | |
| 77 | Zahid Hussain | 2011 | 2011 | 2 | 9 | 7* | 9.00 | 0 | 0 | 120 | 2 | 1/37 | 47.00 | 0 | 1 | 0 | |
| 78 | Damodar Daesrath | 2012 | 2013 | 4 | 95 | 40 | 31.66 | 0 | 0 | 72 | 2 | 1/13 | 24.00 | 0 | 2 | 0 | |
| 79 | Jeremy Gordon | 2012 | 2024 | 12 | 23 | 7* | 4.60 | 0 | 0 | 548 | 19 | 6/43 | 25.52 | 1 | 1 | 0 | |
| 80 | Darren Ramsammy † | 2012 | 2012 | 1 | 0 | 0 | 0.00 | 0 | 0 | – | – | – | – | – | 0 | 0 | |
| 81 | Zeeshan Siddiqi | 2012 | 2014 | 2 | 50 | 43 | 25.00 | 0 | 0 | – | – | – | – | – | 0 | 0 | |
| 82 | Nikhil Dutta | 2013 | 2024 | 7 | 126 | 56 | 31.50 | 1 | 0 | 288 | 4 | 2/30 | 51.50 | 0 | 1 | 0 | |
| 83 | Raza-ur-Rehman | 2013 | 2014 | 6 | 225 | 88 | 45.00 | 0 | 0 | 122 | 1 | 1/59 | 128.00 | 0 | 4 | 0 | |
| 84 | Rayyan Pathan | 2013 | 2013 | 1 | 2 | 2 | 2.00 | 0 | 0 | 36 | 2 | 2/50 | 25.00 | 0 | 0 | 0 | |
| 85 | Kenneth Kamyuka | 2013 | 2013 | 2 | 2 | 2 | 2.00 | 0 | 0 | 47 | 4 | 4/38 | 11.75 | 0 | 0 | 0 | |
| 86 | Aaron Johnson | 2023 | 2026 | 27 | 660 | 70 | 25.38 | 4 | 0 | 24 | 0 | – | – | – | 13 | 0 | |
| 87 | Kaleem Sana | 2023 | 2026 | 35 | 158 | 17 | 9.87 | 0 | 0 | 1,724 | 55 | 4/30 | 23.74 | 0 | 7 | 0 | |
| 88 | Nicholas Kirton ‡ | 2023 | 2026 | 32 | 706 | 73* | 28.24 | 6 | 0 | 162 | 4 | 2/26 | 34.00 | 0 | 14 | 0 | |
| 89 | Pargat Singh | 2023 | 2026 | 34 | 1045 | 102 | 33.70 | 7 | 1 | 209 | 7 | 2/22 | 25.14 | 0 | 6 | 0 | |
| 90 | Ravinderpal Singh | 2023 | 2024 | 6 | 98 | 34 | 19.60 | 0 | 0 | – | – | – | – | – | 4 | 0 | |
| 91 | Saad Bin Zafar ‡ | 2023 | 2026 | 37 | 460 | 40* | 17.03 | 0 | 0 | 1,869 | 34 | 3/30 | 39.79 | 0 | 10 | 0 | |
| 92 | Matthew Spoors | 2023 | 2026 | 11 | 86 | 33 | 17.20 | 0 | 0 | 90 | 3 | 3/42 | 27.66 | 0 | 4 | 0 | |
| 93 | Harsh Thaker | 2023 | 2026 | 37 | 1032 | 111* | 32.25 | 4 | 2 | 1,527 | 30 | 4/37 | 37.63 | 0 | 16 | 0 | |
| 94 | Srimantha Wijeratne † | 2023 | 2024 | 10 | 254 | 63 | 25.40 | 3 | 0 | – | – | – | – | – | 12 | 3 | |
| 95 | Dillon Heyliger | 2023 | 2025 | 23 | 213 | 56 | 14.20 | 1 | 0 | 1,042 | 37 | 5/31 | 23.89 | 1 | 3 | 0 | |
| 96 | Uday Bhagwan | 2024 | 2024 | 4 | 26 | 20* | 26.00 | 0 | 0 | 147 | 3 | 3/40 | 57.33 | 0 | 1 | 0 | |
| 97 | Navneet Dhaliwal‡ | 2024 | 2025 | 18 | 456 | 87 | 26.82 | 4 | 0 | 6 | 0 | – | – | – | 10 | 0 | |
| 98 | Shreyas Movva † | 2024 | 2026 | 32 | 639 | 83* | 30.42 | 4 | 0 | – | – | – | – | – | 30 | 3 | |
| 99 | Shahid Ahmadzai | 2024 | 2025 | 7 | 38 | 13 | 9.50 | 0 | 0 | 306 | 5 | 4/34 | 36.20 | 0 | 2 | 0 | |
| 100 | Ishwarjot Sohi | 2024 | 2024 | 2 | 0 | 0 | 0.00 | 0 | 0 | 90 | 4 | 2/30 | 19.50 | 0 | 0 | 0 | |
| 101 | Dilpreet Bajwa | 2024 | 2025 | 9 | 108 | 26 | 13.50 | 0 | 0 | 54 | 1 | 1/14 | 50.00 | 0 | 2 | 0 | |
| 102 | Ammar Khalid | 2024 | 2024 | 4 | – | – | – | – | – | 198 | 5 | 2/33 | 29.20 | 0 | 0 | 0 | |
| 103 | Aaditya Varadarajan | 2024 | 2026 | 7 | 167 | 64 | 23.85 | 2 | 0 | – | – | – | – | – | 2 | 0 | |
| 104 | Rishiv Joshi | 2024 | 2024 | 1 | 3 | 3 | 3.00 | 0 | 0 | 60 | 0 | – | – | 0 | 1 | 0 | |
| 105 | Kanwarpal Tathgur | 2024 | 2024 | 1 | – | – | – | – | – | – | – | – | – | – | 0 | 0 | |
| 106 | Akhil Kumar | 2024 | 2026 | 12 | 164 | 48* | 23.42 | 0 | 0 | 456 | 13 | 4/68 | 32.23 | 0 | 2 | 0 | |
| 107 | Ansh Patel | 2024 | 2024 | 2 | – | – | – | – | – | 84 | 3 | 2/36 | 27.00 | 0 | 2 | 0 | |
| 108 | Parveen Kumar | 2024 | 2025 | 7 | 41 | 23 | 13.66 | 0 | 0 | 303 | 4 | 2/15 | 50.50 | 0 | 3 | 0 | |
| 109 | Gurbaz Bajwa | 2024 | 2024 | 1 | – | – | – | – | – | 37 | 0 | – | – | 0 | 0 | 0 | |
| 110 | Yuvraj Samra | 2025 | 2026 | 19 | 495 | 105 | 29.11 | 3 | 1 | 24 | 1 | 1/31 | 31.00 | 0 | 4 | 0 | |
| 111 | Mansab Gill | 2025 | 2025 | 5 | 124 | 59 | 31.00 | 2 | 0 | – | – | – | – | – | 0 | 0 | |
| 112 | Shivam Sharma | 2025 | 2026 | 8 | 123 | 37 | 20.50 | 0 | 0 | 342 | 8 | 4/69 | 39.25 | 0 | 5 | 0 | |
| 113 | Jatinderpal Matharu | 2025 | 2025 | 2 | 7 | 7* | – | 0 | 0 | 78 | 0 | – | – | 0 | 0 | 0 | |
| 114 | Anop Santosh† | 2025 | 2025 | 1 | 2 | 2 | 2.00 | 0 | 0 | – | – | – | – | – | 2 | 0 | |
| 115 | Ali Nadeem | 2025 | 2026 | 6 | 134 | 51 | 22.33 | 1 | 0 | – | – | – | – | – | 8 | 0 | |
| 116 | Jaskaran Singh | 2025 | 2025 | 3 | 38 | 32 | 12.66 | 0 | 0 | 150 | 4 | 3/71 | 33.75 | 0 | 0 | 0 | |
| 117 | Sukhjider Singh | 2026 | 2026 | 6 | 31 | 14 | 5.20 | 0 | 0 | 264 | 7 | 3/38 | 26.28 | 0 | 2 | 0 | |
| 118 | Zahid Shirzad | 2026 | 2026 | 9 | 59 | 54 | 11.80 | 1 | 0 | 516 | 21 | 4/60 | 21.85 | 0 | 1 | 0 | |
| 119 | Meet Patel | 2026 | 2026 | 1 | 11 | 11 | 11.00 | 0 | 0 | 30 | 1 | 1/37 | 37.00 | 0 | 0 | 0 | |
| 120 | Ali Khan | 2026 | 2026 | 1 | 5 | 5* | – | 0 | 0 | 48 | 0 | – | – | 0 | 0 | 0 | |
| 121 | Anoop Chima | 2026 | 2026 | 2 | 28 | 24 | 14.00 | 0 | 0 | – | – | – | – | 0 | 0 | 0 | |
| 122 | Ajayveer Hundal | 2026 | 2026 | 2 | 26 | 20 | 13.00 | 0 | 0 | 37 | 2 | 2/46 | 23.00 | 0 | 2 | 0 | |
| 123 | Sheel Patel | 2026 | 2026 | 4 | 30 | 20 | 7.50 | 0 | 0 | 216 | 7 | 3/38 | 21.42 | 0 | 2 | 0 | |
| 124 | Samit Gohel | 2026 | 2026 | 3 | 119 | 67 | 39.66 | 1 | 0 | – | – | – | – | 0 | 2 | 0 | |

== See also ==
- One Day International
- Canadian cricket team
- Canadian national cricket captains
- List of Canada Twenty20 International cricketers
