= 2008 Quadrangular Twenty20 Series in Canada =

The 2008 Quadrangular Twenty20 Series in Canada was a tournament of Twenty20 International cricket matches that was held in Canada from 10 to 13 October 2008. The four participating teams are Canada, Pakistan, Sri Lanka and Zimbabwe. The matches were played at the North-West ground of Maple Leaf Cricket Club in King City, Ontario. Sri Lanka defeated Pakistan by five wickets in the final.

== Squads ==
Canada	Pakistan	Sri Lanka	Zimbabwe
Sunil Dhaniram (c); Abdool Samad (vc); Harvir Baidwan; Balaji Rao; Umar Bhatti; Manoj David; Abzal Dean; Karun Jethi; Sandeep Jyoti; Eion Katchay; Mohammad Iqbal; Ashif Mulla (WK); Henry Osinde; Rizwan Cheema	Shoaib Malik (c); Misbah-ul-Haq (VC); Abdur Rauf; Anwar Ali; Fawad Alam; Kamran Akmal (WK); Khalid Latif; Salman Butt; Shahid Afridi; Shoaib Akhtar; Shoaib Khan; Sohail Khan; Sohail Tanvir; Umar Gul; Younis Khan	Mahela Jayawardene (Captain); Dilhara Lokuhettige; Tillakaratne Dilshan (WK); Dilhara Fernando; Sanath Jayasuriya; Thilina Kandamby; Chamara Kapugedera; Nuwan Kulasekara; Jeevantha Kulatunga; Farveez Maharoof; Ajantha Mendis; Jehan Mubarak; Thilan Thushara; Mahela Udawatte; Kaushalya Weeraratne	Prosper Utseya (Captain); Regis Chakabva (WK); Chamu Chibhabha; Elton Chigumbura; Graeme Cremer; Keith Dabengwa; Timycen Maruma; Hamilton Masakadza; Stuart Matsikenyeri; Chris Mpofu; Tawanda Mupariwa; Taurai Muzarabani; Ray Price; Tatenda Taibu (WK); Cephas Zhuwao

== Group stage ==
=== Points table ===
Pos	Team	Pld	W	L	T	NR	Pts	NRR
1	Pakistan	3	3	0	0	0	6	0.828
2	Sri Lanka	3	2	1	0	0	4	0.315
3	Zimbabwe	3	1	2	0	0	2	−0.295
4	Canada	3	0	3	0	0	0	−0.833

=== Matches ===
10 October 2008
13:30 GMT
Scorecard

Zimbabwe; 106/8 (17 overs)	v	Sri Lanka; 107/5 (16 overs)
Tatenda Taibu 40* (40); Ajantha Mendis 4/15 (4 overs)		Tillakaratne Dilshan 33 (38); Ray Price 2/9 (4 overs)

Sri Lanka won by 5 wickets
Maple Leaf Cricket Club, King City, Ontario
Umpires: Karran Bayney (Can) and Mark Benson (Eng)
Player of the match: Ajantha Mendis (SL)

- Rain shortened match to 17 overs per side.

10 October 2008
17:30 GMT
Scorecard

Pakistan; 137/7 (20 overs)	v	Canada; 102/9 (20 overs)
Salman Butt 74 (56); Harvir Baidwan 3/15 (3 overs)		Rizwan Cheema 34 (42); Shoaib Akhtar 2/11 (3 overs)

Pakistan won by 35 runs
Maple Leaf Cricket Club, King City, Ontario
Umpires: Karran Bayney (Can) and Mark Benson (Eng)
Player of the match: Salman Butt (Pak)

11 October 2008
13:30 GMT
Scorecard

Canada; 135/7 (20 overs)	v	Zimbabwe; 135/9 (20 overs)
Karun Jethi 24 (24); E Chigumbura 2/31 (3 overs)		Tatenda Taibu 37 (38); Harvir Baidwan 3/27 (4 overs)

Match tied; Zimbabwe won bowl-out 3–1
Maple Leaf Cricket Club, King City, Ontario
Umpires: Karran Bayney (Can) and Mark Benson (Eng)
Player of the match: Tatenda Taibu (Zim)

11 October 2008
17:30 GMT
Scorecard

Sri Lanka; 137/9 (20 overs)	v	Pakistan; 141/7 (19.5 overs)
Jehan Mubarak 39 (29); Umar Gul 4/13 (3 overs)		Shoaib Malik 42* (33); Kaushalya Weeraratne 4/19 (4 overs)

Pakistan won by 3 wickets
Maple Leaf Cricket Club, King City, Ontario
Umpires: Karran Bayney (Can) and Mark Benson (Eng)
Player of the match: Shoaib Malik (Pak)

12 October 2008
13:30 GMT
Scorecard

Zimbabwe; 107/8 (20 overs)	v	Pakistan; 110/3 (19 overs)
Hamilton Masakadza 53 (38); Fawad Alam 3/7 (3 overs)		Shoaib Khan 50 (54); Chris Mpofu 3/16 (3 overs)

Pakistan won by 7 wickets
Maple Leaf Cricket Club, King City, Ontario
Umpires: Karran Bayney (Can) and Mark Benson (Eng)
Player of the match: Shoaib Khan (Pak)

- Pakistan qualified for the final as a result of this match.

12 October 2008
17:30 GMT
Scorecard

Sri Lanka; 153/7 (20 overs)	v	Canada; 138 (20 overs)
Mahela Jayawardene 35 (21); Ajantha Mendis 4/17 (4 overs)		Rizwan Cheema 68 (43); Balaji Rao 3/21 (4 overs)

Sri Lanka won by 15 runs
Maple Leaf Cricket Club, King City, Ontario
Umpires: Karran Bayney (Can) and Mark Benson (Eng)
Player of the match: Ajantha Mendis (SL)

- Sri Lanka qualified for the final as a result of this match.

== Third place playoff ==
13 October 2008
13:30 GMT
Scorecard

Zimbabwe; 184/5 (20 overs)	v	Canada; 75 (19.2 overs)
Hamilton Masakadza 79 (52); Prosper Utseya 3/26 (4 overs)		Abdool Samad 29 (23); Balaji Rao 2/33 (4 overs)

Zimbabwe won by 109 runs
Maple Leaf Cricket Club, King City, Ontario
Umpires: Karran Bayney (Can) and Mark Benson (Eng)
Player of the match: Hamilton Masakadza (Zim)

== Final ==
13 October 2008
17:30 GMT
Scorecard

Pakistan; 132/7 (20 overs)	v	Sri Lanka; 133/5 (19 overs)
Salman Butt 44 (41); Shoaib Malik 2/17 (4 overs)		Sanath Jayasuriya 40 (34); Ajantha Mendis 3/23 (4 overs)

Sri Lanka won by 5 wickets
Maple Leaf Cricket Club, King City, Ontario
Umpires: Karran Bayney (Can) and Mark Benson (Eng)
Player of the match: Sanath Jayasuriya (SL)
