= Aftab Shamshudeen =

Canadian cricketer (born 1977)

Personal information
- Full name: Aftabodeen Shamshudeen
- Born: 9 July 1977 (age 49); New Amsterdam, Guyana
- Batting: Right-handed
- Bowling: Right-arm off-break
- Role: Wicket-keeper

International information
- National side: Canada
- Only ODI (cap 53): 18 October 2007 v Kenya

Career statistics
Competition	ODI
Matches	1
Runs scored	3
Batting average	3.00
100s/50s	0/0
Top score	3
Balls bowled	18
Wickets	0
Bowling average	–
5 wickets in innings	–
10 wickets in match	–
Best bowling	–
Catches/stumpings	0/–
- Source: CricketArchive, 24 November 2008

Aftabodeen Shamshudeen (born 9 July 1977) is a Guyanese-born cricketer who has played one One Day International for Canada.
