= Calvert Hooper =

Canadian cricketer (born 1982)

Personal information
- Full name: Calvert Kenroy Hooper
- Born: 10 August 1982 (age 44); Saint Vincent and the Grenadines
- Batting: Right-handed
- Bowling: Right-arm fast-medium
- Role: Bowler

International information
- National side: Canada
- Only ODI (cap 49): 18 October 2007 v Kenya

Career statistics
Competition	ODI
Matches	1
Runs scored	4
Batting average	4.00
100s/50s	0/0
Top score	4
Balls bowled	49
Wickets	1
Bowling average	66.00
5 wickets in innings	0
10 wickets in match	0
Best bowling	1/66
Catches/stumpings	0/–
- Source: CricketArchive, 24 November 2008

Calvert Kenroy Hooper (born 10 August 1982) is a cricketer who has played one One Day International for Canada.
