= Sami Faridi =

Saudi Arabian-born cricketer

Personal information
- Full name: Abdus Sami Faridi
- Born: 7 September 1983 (age 43); Jeddah, Saudi Arabia
- Batting: Right-handed
- Bowling: Slow left-arm wrist-spin
- Role: Bowler

International information
- National side: Canada
- ODI debut (cap 56): 29 June 2008 v Bermuda
- Last ODI: 22 August 2008 v West Indies

Career statistics
Competition	ODI
Matches	3
Runs scored	19
Batting average	9.50
100s/50s	0/0
Top score	16
Balls bowled	60
Wickets	0
Bowling average	–
5 wickets in innings	–
10 wickets in match	–
Best bowling	–
Catches/stumpings	0/–
- Source: CricketArchive, 29 November 2008

Abdus Sami Faridi (Arabic: سامي فريدي; born 7 September 1983) is a Saudi Arabian-born cricketer who has played three One Day Internationals for Canada.
