= Karran Bayney =

Canadian cricket umpire

Personal information
- Born: 20 November 1956 (age 69); Bel Air, Guyana

Umpiring information
- ODIs umpired: 4 (2009–2010)
- T20Is umpired: 8 (2008)
- Source: Cricinfo, 16 May 2014

Karran Bayney (born 20 November 1956) is a Guyana-born Canadian former cricket umpire. The 12 international matches that he has officiated in include four ODI games from 2009 to 2010 and eight Twenty20 Internationals in 2008.

== See also ==
- List of One Day International cricket umpires
- List of Twenty20 International cricket umpires
