= John Langridge =

John Langridge may refer to:

- John Langridge (cricketer) (1910–1999), English cricketer
- John Langridge (merchant) (1864–1931), New Zealand shopkeeper
