= Abdool Samad =

Canadian cricketer (born 1979)

Personal information
- Full name: Abdool Mudassar Samad
- Born: 3 May 1979 (age 47); Kabakaburi, Guyana
- Nickname: Birdie
- Batting: Right-handed
- Bowling: Right-arm off break
- Role: Occasional wicket-keeper
- Relatives: Abdul Sattaur (brother)

International information
- National side: Canada (2003–2010)
- ODI debut (cap 28): 3 March 2003 v New Zealand
- Last ODI: 22 August 2009 v Kenya
- T20I debut (cap 9): 2 August 2008 v Netherlands
- Last T20I: 4 February 2010 v Afghanistan

Career statistics
| Competition | ODI | T20I | FC | LA |
|---|---|---|---|---|
| Matches | 27 | 7 | 5 | 38 |
| Runs scored | 740 | 97 | 284 | 798 |
| Batting average | 29.60 | 16.16 | 21.55 | 22.80 |
| 100s/50s | 1/2 | 0/0 | 1/1 | 1/2 |
| Top score | 130 | 29 | 119 | 130 |
| Balls bowled | 235 | 12 | 246 | 352 |
| Wickets | 7 | 1 | 2 | 8 |
| Bowling average | 40.14 | 36.00 | 82.00 | 44.62 |
| 5 wickets in innings | 0 | 0 | 0 | 0 |
| 10 wickets in match | 0 | 0 | 0 | 0 |
| Best bowling | 1/8 | 1/36 | 2/71 | 1/8 |
| Catches/stumpings | 9/– | 1/– | 0/– | 14/– |
- Source: Cricinfo, 28 April 2020

Abdool Mudassar Samad (born 3 May 1979) is a Guyana-born Canadian cricketer. He played in 27 One Day Internationals for Canada. He also played first-class for them, including scoring 119 on his first-class debut against Bermuda in the 2006 ICC Intercontinental Cup. Samad plays for the Toronto and District Cricket Association. He also coaches young students in Toronto who might become future stars. He is the younger brother of Abdul Sattaur, who also represented Canada at cricket.
