= Geoff Barnett (cricketer) =

Canadian cricketer (born 1984)

Personal information
- Full name: Geoffrey Edward Fulton Barnett
- Born: 3 February 1984 (age 42); Nelson, New Zealand
- Batting: Left-handed
- Bowling: Right-arm medium

International information
- National side: Canada (2006–2010)
- ODI debut (cap 29): 16 May 2006 v Zimbabwe
- Last ODI: 7 July 2010 v Kenya
- T20I debut (cap 3): 2 August 2008 v Netherlands
- Last T20I: 10 February 2010 v Kenya

Domestic team information
- Years: Team
- 2004/05–2007/08: Central Districts

Career statistics
| Competition | ODI | T20I | FC | LA |
|---|---|---|---|---|
| Matches | 22 | 5 | 29 | 55 |
| Runs scored | 455 | 131 | 1,190 | 1,309 |
| Batting average | 20.68 | 32.75 | 23.80 | 24.69 |
| 100s/50s | 0/1 | 0/0 | 2/5 | 1/6 |
| Top score | 77 | 36 | 136 | 102* |
| Balls bowled | – | 6 | 130 | 12 |
| Wickets | – | 0 | 1 | 0 |
| Bowling average | – | – | 115.00 | – |
| 5 wickets in innings | – | – | 0 | – |
| 10 wickets in match | – | – | 0 | – |
| Best bowling | – | – | 1/10 | – |
| Catches/stumpings | 7/– | 2/– | 28/– | 18/– |
- Source: Cricinfo, 4 January 2010

Geoffrey Edward Fulton Barnett (born 3 February 1984) is a Canadian and New Zealand cricket player who plays first-class cricket for the New Zealand Central Districts.

Barnett is a left-handed opening batsman who scored his maiden first-class century in his twelfth match, making 136 for Canada against Kenya in their Intercontinental Cup game in August which Canada won by 25 runs. This was his third outing for Canada, and his first in first-class cricket, after playing two One Day Internationals for Canada against Zimbabwe (where he was run out for 0) and Bermuda. In both matches he was dismissed in single figures. He then played in two more ODIs, against Kenya, scoring 35 in the second innings.

He has not played for Canada since then as he has been unavailable due to his commitments with Central Districts in New Zealand, although he was selected for Canada for a series of qualifying tournaments for the 2011 ICC World Cup.
