= Sunil Dhaniram =

West Indian cricketer

Personal information
- Full name: Sunil Dhaniram
- Born: 17 October 1968 (age 58); Port Mourant, Berbice, Guyana
- Batting: Left-handed
- Bowling: Slow left-arm orthodox
- Role: All-Rounder
- Relatives: Sudesh Dhaniram (brother)

International information
- National side: Canada (2006–2010)
- ODI debut (cap 31): 16 May 2006 v Zimbabwe
- Last ODI: 5 July 2010 v Netherlands
- T20I debut (cap 5): 2 August 2008 v Netherlands
- Last T20I: 10 February 2010 v Kenya

Domestic team information
- Years: Team
- 1992/93–1994/95: Guyana

Career statistics
Competition	ODI	T20I	FC	LA
Matches	44	11	32	68
Runs scored	915	100	1,444	1,456
Batting average	24.72	11.11	33.58	26.47
100s/50s	0/6	0/0	3/6	1/7
Top score	92	26	144	100*
Balls bowled	1,775	202	2,674	2,504
Wickets	41	6	38	59
Bowling average	30.53	32.00	27.89	32.00
5 wickets in innings	1	0	1	1
10 wickets in match	0	0	0	0
Best bowling	5/32	2/9	5/20	5/32
Catches/stumpings	8/–	4/–	26/–	12/–
- Source: Cricinfo, 5 January 2017

Sunil Dhaniram (born 17 October 1968) is a former Canadian cricketer and a former captain of the national team, who played ODIs and T20Is. He formerly played for Guyana from 1993 to 1995. He made his Canadian debut on 2 October 2003 playing against the Windward Islands. He made his ODI debut for Canada on 16 May 2006 against Zimbabwe, and has played 44 ODIs in his career. He has also played for Canada in seven ICC Intercontinental Cup games, and represented them in the 2007 Cricket World Cup.

== Guyana ==
From 1993 to 1995, Dhaniram represented his home country of Guyana in a few of the prime years of West Indian Cricket. During that time, he played 12 first class matches for Guyana, scoring 270 runs, including a high score of 57 against Leeward Islands in 1994. . His last match representing Guyana was against Barbados in 1995. Dhaniram made painful scores of 4 and 2 in that match. He was never really a bowler for Guyana, like he regularly did with Canada, but he did roll his arm over for 5 overs, which went for 16 runs in his time with Guyana. An interesting fact was that, in that time, Shivnarine Chanderpaul was a regular bowler for Guyana, and the West Indies as well.

== International career ==
=== Early years ===
Dhaniram migrated to Canada, and in 2003, he was picked as an all-rounder for Canada. He made his debut in a List A match against Windward Islands, and he troubled the Windward Islands batsmen throughout his spell, as only runs 15 runs came off his 10 overs while he also picked up 3 wickets. He came in at No.4 to bat and made 18 runs, before Darren Sammy took his wicket. Dhaniram was dismissed for a two-ball duck on his first-class debut for Canada - against USA - but recovered to record 65* in the second innings. In the next few years, Sunil kept producing consistent results, including picking up a 5-for against Cayman Islands, and scoring a 141* against UAE.

=== 2007 World Cup ===
Dhaniram was a part of the squad that Canada sent to the West Indies to participate in the 2007 Cricket World Cup. Canada didn't win any matches, but it wasn't a bad tournament for them, and Dhaniram. In Canada's first match, Sunil made 34*, and bowled 9 overs for 34 runs, while also picking up the wicket of Kenya's wicketkeeper. The second match against England was probably one of the highlights of his career. Dhaniram bowled all 10 overs of his spell for 41 runs while also picking up 3 wickets. That includes the price wicket of Kevin Pietersen, definitely a wicket that will always leave a happy memory in his head. He also made 30 runs with the bat to complete an excellent all-round effort. The last match in that World Cup for Canada was against New Zealand. His bowling effort was forgettable as the New Zealand batsmen smacked him around for 72 runs in his 8 overs. In his batting innings, he was going good on 17, when a delivery from Jacob Oram struck him hard on his hand and forced him to retire hurt. It was a successful tournament for Dhaniram as he made 81 runs in 3 matches, and picked up 4 wickets at an economy rate of 5.44.

=== Captaincy & late career ===
Sunil was named captain for Canada's Intercontinental Cup matches against Kenya and Namibia in October 2007, when Ashish Bagai was ruled out because of work commitments. Canada lost both of those matches. However, Dhaniram put out great performances with both bat and ball in those two matches, which includes a 78 against Kenya. In 2008, Dhaniram captained Canada in the famous 2008 Quadrangular Twenty20 tournament, in which big guns Sri Lanka and Pakistan came to Canada to play in a 4-team tournament that also included Zimbabwe. Canada put up a fight, but they didn't win any matches, and Dhaniram had a couple of decent performances with bat-and-ball.

Sunil enjoyed a prolific year, in general with the ball in 2008, picking up his third five-wicket haul for Canada in a limited-overs match against Bermuda and picking up 26 wickets across all formats. He remained a consistent allround performer for Canada, despite his age, and in 2009 was one of six players to receive central contracts. Dhaniram achieved his best score of 144 against a tough opposition in Netherlands, at age 39. That match ended in a draw. A year later, Dhaniram made a 130 against Afghanistan, in a match which Canada went on to lose. The way he was performing, it didn't seem like he would retire that same year. However, at age 41, Sunil played his last match for Canada against Ireland in August 2010, and had scores of 17 and 6, while also called upon from captain, and long time teammate Ashish Bagai to bowl an over in the 2nd innings that went for 4 runs. That turned out to be the end of a prolific career as he announced his retirement after that match.

Sunil Dhaniram is the world's oldest cricketer to pick up his maiden fifer in ODI history at the age of 39 years and 256 days for Canada.

== Post-Retirement ==
Sunil Dhaniram now represents Our Own SC in the Ontario Masters Softball Cricket League. In the 2014 edition, while representing Guyana Sports Club, he scored an incredible 499 runs in 8 matches which includes a 146.

== Family ==
Dhaniram's brother, Sudesh, who formerly played for Guyana just like his brother, joined Sunil in immigrating as well, but he migrated to USA, a team that he played for himself and they actually faced off against each other in a couple of matches.
