= Karl Whatham =

Australian-born cricketer (born 1981)

Personal information
- Full name: Karl Whatham
- Born: 27 August 1981 (age 45); Australia
- Batting: Right-handed
- Bowling: Right-arm off break
- Role: Batsman

International information
- National side: Canada
- Only ODI (cap 73): 16 March 2011 v Australia
- ODI shirt no.: 5

Career statistics
Competition	ODI
Matches	1
Runs scored	18
Batting average	18
100s/50s	0/0
Top score	18
Balls bowled	–
Wickets	–
Bowling average	–
5 wickets in innings	–
10 wickets in match	–
Best bowling	–
Catches/stumpings	–/–
- Source: CricketArchive, 30 April 2023

Karl Whatham (born 27 August 1981) is an Australian-born cricketer who has played one One Day International for Canada.

== Career ==
Whatham was a member of the Canadian squad for the 2011 Cricket World Cup in India, Sri Lanka and Bangladesh. He made his debut in Canadian final group match against Australia, where he scored 18 runs from 41 balls.

Living in British Columbia, Whatham was employed by the organising committee for the 2010 Winter Olympics as a procurement coordinator.
