= Austin Codrington =

Canadian cricketer

Personal information
- Full name: Austin Codrington
- Born: 22 August 1975 (age 51); Portland, Jamaica
- Batting: Right-handed
- Bowling: Right-arm medium-fast
- Role: Bowler

International information
- National side: Canada (2003–2007)
- ODI debut (cap 17): 11 February 2003 v Bangladesh
- Last ODI: 5 February 2007 v Kenya

Domestic team information
- Years: Team
- 2001/02–2007: Canada

Career statistics
Competition	ODI	FC	LA	ICC T
Matches	9	4	24	3
Runs scored	47	96	267	34
Batting average	5.87	16.00	12.71	11.33
100s/50s	0/0	0/0	0/0	0/0
Top score	16	48	33	13
Balls bowled	300	420	934	126
Wickets	10	5	21	2
Bowling average	26.50	40.60	35.38	48.00
5 wickets in innings	1	0	1	0
10 wickets in match	0	0	0	0
Best bowling	5/27	2/56	5/27	1/17
Catches/stumpings	0/–	1/–	6/–	0/–
- Source: CricketArchive, 19 November 2016

Austin Codrington (born 22 August 1975) is a Canadian former One Day International (ODI) cricketer. He is primarily a bowler but can contribute useful runs near the bottom of the order on occasion; as of 2005 he has a highest first-class score of 48. His fielding is also very good, particularly his catching.

== International career ==
The 2001 ICC Trophy was held in Canada and Codrington played in three matches, all in Toronto, but took only two wickets. After making appearances in the 2001-02 ICC 6 Nations Challenge in Namibia and the 2002–03 Red Stripe Bowl in St Lucia, he was part of the Canadian team that participated in the 2003 World Cup and made an immediate impression.

The game against Test side Bangladesh at Durban was Canada's first ODI for 24 years, since the 1979 World Cup. After chipping in with 16 runs to help his side to 180 all out (at the time Canada's highest total in ODIs) Codrington claimed 5-27 from nine overs to reduce the Bangladeshis from the relative comfort of 106/4 to 120 all out, guiding Canada to their first win at this level, as well as claiming the best innings figures for Canada in ODIs.

Codrington played in four of Canada's other five matches in that World Cup, but did not manage to repeat his success, picking up only one more wicket and suffering the humiliation of playing in the side bowled out for 36 by Sri Lanka; this was the lowest-ever ODI total until Zimbabwe beat it by one run in 2004. Further appearances at List A level followed in the 2003–04 Red Stripe Bowl and 2004 ICC Six Nations Challenge, as well as the non-List A ICC Americas Championship.

Codrington was not selected for either the 2005 ICC Trophy or the 2005 ICC Intercontinental Cup, but did return to the Canadian team in August 2006 for the ODIs against Bermuda and the subsequent ICC Americas Championship tournament. He was not selected on their tour to South Africa in November/December however.

== Domestic career ==
In August 2004, Codrington made his first-class debut against Bermuda in the ICC Intercontinental Cup, hitting 48 in his only innings but taking just one wicket in a drawn game. In the semi-final of the competition in November, against the UAE at Sharjah, he made 42 in the second innings and claimed three wickets. He was retained for the final against Scotland at the same venue four days later, but was out for 1 in both innings and took only one wicket as Canada were crushed by an innings and 84 runs.
