= Jitendra Patel =

Ugandan-born Canadian cricketer (born 1945)

Personal information
- Full name: Jitendra Motibhai Patel
- Batting: Left-handed
- Bowling: Slow left-arm orthodox

International information
- National side: Canada (1979-1979)
- ODI debut (cap 6): 9 June 1979 v Pakistan
- Last ODI: 16 June 1979 v Australia
- Source: ESPNcricinfo, 17 September 2020

Jitendra Patel (born 26 November 1945) is a Ugandan-born former cricketer who played for the Canadian cricket team. A left-handed batter and left-arm orthodox bowler, Patel played three One Day Internationals in the 1979 World Cup, as well as appeared for the country in the 1979 ICC Trophy tournament.
