= Cecil Marshall =

Trinidadian-born Canadian cricketer

Cricket information
- Batting: Right-handed
- Bowling: Right-arm medium

International information
- National side: Canada (1979)
- ODI debut (cap 4): 9 June 1979 v Pakistan
- Last ODI: 13 June 1979 v England

Career statistics
Competition	ODI
Matches	2
Runs scored	10
Batting average	5.00
100s/50s	0/0
Top score	8
Catches/stumpings	0/–
- Source: ESPNcricinfo, 17 September 2020

Cecil Alphonso Marshall (13 September 1939 – 10 September 2011) was a Trinidadian-born Canadian cricketer. A right-handed batter and medium-paced bowler, he played two One Day Internationals for Canada. After playing for Canada he played and umpired cricket in Ottawa.
