= Joseph Harris (cricketer) =

Canadian cricketer (born 1965)

Personal information
- Full name: Joseph Vikram Harris
- Born: 16 August 1965 (age 61); Madras, India
- Batting: Right-handed
- Bowling: Right-arm offbreak
- Role: Batsman

International information
- National side: Canada (2003)
- ODI debut (cap 20): 11 February 2003 v Bangladesh
- Last ODI: 3 March 2003 v New Zealand

Domestic team information
- Years: Team
- 1988/89: Barbados

Career statistics
Competition	ODI	FC	LA	ICC T
Matches	6	2	33	10
Runs scored	91	4	656	329
Batting average	15.16	4.00	21.86	41.12
100s/50s	0/0	0/0	0/2	0/3
Top score	31	4	63	79
Balls bowled	0	198	591	78
Wickets	–	0	12	2
Bowling average	–	–	38.66	23.00
5 wickets in innings	–	–	0	0
10 wickets in match	–	–	0	0
Best bowling	–	–	2/28	2/28
Catches/stumpings	1/–	1/–	9/–	1/–
- Source: , 23 July 2009

Joseph Vikram Harris (born 16 August 1965) is an Indian-born Canadian cricketer. He is a right-handed batsman and a right-hand offbreak bowler.

Having played cricket since the mid-eighties, including a handful of matches for Barbados he became the leader of the Canadian cricket team in 2003, captaining them into the 2003 Cricket World Cup. He made himself a renowned name for the Canadian team in the Toronto Leagues, leading them to victory in the first Americas Cup. He originally planned to retire after the World Cup, but was lured back for the 2004 ICC 6 Nations Challenge owing to the absence of John Davison. Canada lost all their games in that tournament, and Harris has not played since. Harris has a daughter, Erika.
