= Nicholas de Groot =

Canadian cricketer (born 1975)

Cricket information
- Batting: Right-handed
- Bowling: Right-arm medium

International information
- National side: Canada
- ODI debut: 11 February 2003 v Bangladesh
- Last ODI: 3 March 2003 v New Zealand

Career statistics
Competition	ODI	First-class
Matches	6	34
Runs scored	44	1191
Batting average	7.33	20.89
100s/50s	0/0	0/6
Top score	17	78
Balls bowled	81	6
Wickets	3	0
Bowling average	29.33	–
5 wickets in innings	0	–
10 wickets in match	0	–
Best bowling	2/45	–
Catches/stumpings	0/–	23/1
- Source: Cricket Archive (subscription required)

Nicholas de Groot (born 22 October 1975) is a Canadian cricketer. He is a right-handed batsman and a right-arm medium-pace bowler with an elegant batting action who has played for both Canada and Guyana. With few chances at Guyanese cricket from his start in 1994/95, he turned to Canada for the 2001 ICC Trophy, making crucial contributions for this competition and qualification for the 2003 Cricket World Cup. He played in all Canada's World Cup matches in 2003, but has only played twice for them since.
