= Glenroy Sealy =

Barbadian-born Canadian cricketer (born 1940)

Personal information
- Full name: Glenroy Ricardo Sealy
- Born: 11 June 1940 (age 86); Chase Land, Tweedside Road, St Michael, Barbados
- Batting: Right-handed
- Bowling: Right-arm medium

International information
- National side: Canada (1979)
- ODI debut (cap 7): 9 June 1979 v Pakistan
- Last ODI: 16 June 1979 v Australia

Career statistics
Competition	ODI
Matches	3
Runs scored	73
Batting average	24.33
100s/50s	0/0
Top score	45
Balls bowled	36
Wickets	0
Bowling average	–
5 wickets in innings	–
10 wickets in match	–
Best bowling	–
Catches/stumpings	0/–
- Source: ESPNcricinfo, 17 September 2020

Glenroy Ricardo Sealy (born June 11, 1940) is a former Barbadian-born Canadian cricketer. He played three One Day Internationals for Canada in 1979.

== Career ==
Sealy was born in Saint Michael, Barbados on June 11, 1940, and at age 24 played a first-class match for the Barbados cricket team in February 1965 against the International Cavaliers. The right-handed batsman scored 10 runs without being dismissed and took one wicket for 20 runs with his medium pace.

Later, at the ages of 38 and 39, he played in all of Canada's games in the 1979 Cricket World Cup. Sequentially, Sealy played those three One Day Internationals against Pakistan, England, and Australia. Opening the batting, he scored 73 runs, including 45 (110) against Pakistan. In the same game, Sealy bowled for the only time in his international career, sending down 36 deliveries for 21 runs and no wicket.
