= Davis Joseph =

Canadian cricketer (born 1963)

Cricket information
- Batting: Right-handed
- Bowling: Right-arm fast medium

Career statistics
Competition	ODI	List A
Matches	4	31
Runs scored	13	98
Batting average	–	6.53
100s/50s	0/0	0/0
Top score	13	25
Balls bowled	186	1470
Wickets	5	37
Bowling average	34.00	31.59
5 wickets in innings	0	1
10 wickets in match	0	0
Best bowling	2/42	6/39
Catches/stumpings	0/–	2/–
- Source: Cricket Archive (subscription required)

Davis Joseph (born July 31, 1963) is a Canadian cricketer. He is a right-handed batsman and a right-arm fast medium pace bowler. A surprising tail-end batsman, he can occasionally stick it out at number ten for the team, while keeping up a powerful bowling attack.

He was involved in the 2001 ICC Trophy and 2003 World Cup for Canada, and the 2002–03 Red Stripe Bowl, for which, against world-class batsmen, he bowled at an average of a mere 15. During the Commonwealth Games, he was revered for bowling out Sachin Tendulkar for just two runs.

He currently plays for Victoria Park Cricket Club in the Toronto and District league, but has not played for Canada since the 2003 World Cup. He did not participate in the 2007 World Cup.
