= Zubin Surkari =

Canadian cricketer (born 1980)

Personal information
- Full name: Zubin Eruch Surkari
- Born: 26 February 1980 (age 46); Toronto, Ontario, Canada
- Batting: Right-handed
- Bowling: Right-arm medium

International information
- National side: Canada (2008-2010)
- ODI debut (cap 55): 28 June 2008 v Bermuda
- Last ODI: 9 August 2011 v Afghanistan
- T20I debut (cap 10): 2 August 2008 v Netherlands
- Last T20I: 12 October 2008 v Sri Lanka

Career statistics
Competition	ODI	T20I	FC	LA
Matches	23	4	8	38
Runs scored	328	10	352	559
Batting average	17.26	3.33	21.93	16.44
100s/50s	0/0	0/0	1/1	0/0
Top score	49	6	139	49
Catches/stumpings	6/–	0/–	6/–	10/–
- Source: Cricinfo, 25 January 2025

Zubin Eruch Surkari (born 26 February 1980) is a Canadian cricketer. He is a right-handed batsman and a right-arm medium pace bowler. Surkari has represented Canada in six ICC Intercontinental Cup matches, 12 List A matches, the 2004 ICC Americas Championship and the 2005 ICC Trophy. He has a highest first-class score of 139, scored against the UAE in the semi-final of the 2004 ICC Intercontinental Cup.

He has the distinction of being one of a handful of players given out Obstructing the Field in a First Class match, in an ICC Intercontinental Cup match vs Afghanistan on 4 August 2011.
