= Balaji Rao (Canadian cricketer) =

Indian cricketer (born 1978)

Personal information
- Full name: Wandavasi Dorakanti Balaji Rao
- Born: 4 March 1978 (age 48); Chennai, India
- Nickname: Kutty
- Batting: Left-handed
- Bowling: Right-arm leg-break
- Role: Bowler

International information
- National side: Canada (2008–2011)
- ODI debut (cap 62): 24 August 2008 v West Indies
- Last ODI: 16 March 2011 v Australia
- T20I debut (cap 14): 10 October 2008 v Pakistan
- Last T20I: 13 October 2008 v Zimbabwe

Career statistics
Competition	ODI	T20I
Matches	10	4
Runs scored	59	32
Batting average	7.37	10.66
100s/50s	0/0	0/0
Top score	24	22*
Balls bowled	474	84
Wickets	12	6
Bowling average	37.33	17.83
5 wickets in innings	0	0
10 wickets in match	0	0
Best bowling	4/57	3/21
Catches/stumpings	3/–	1/–
- Source: ESPNcricinfo, 16 July 2024

Wandavasi Dorakanti Balaji Rao (born 4 March 1978) is an Indian-Canadian former cricketer who played 10 One Day Internationals and four Twenty20 Internationals for Canada between 2008 and 2011. Earlier in his career, he made appearances for the India national under-19 cricket team.

== Cricket career ==
Balaji represented Tamil Nadu in the Ranji Trophy. He played for the Centurions Cricket Club, a large cricket organization in Toronto.

== Controversies ==
On 3 March 2011, in the 2011 Cricket World Cup match between Canada and Pakistan, following an aggressive exchange between Pakistani bowler Umar Gul, Rao, who was batting, lashed out with Hindi slurs after Pakistani fielder Ahmed Shehzad appeared to provoke the batsman.
