= Tariq Javed =

Canadian Pakistani cricketer (born 1949)

Cricket information
- Batting: Right-handed
- Bowling: Leg-break, googly

International information
- National side: Canada (1979)
- ODI debut (cap 9): 9 June 1979 v Pakistan
- Last ODI: 16 June 1979 v Australia

Career statistics
Competition	ODI
Matches	3
Runs scored	15
Batting average	5.00
100s/50s	0/0
Top score	8
Catches/stumpings
- Source: ESPNcricinfo, 17 September 2020

Tariq Javed (born June 12, 1949) is a former cricketer. He played three One Day Internationals for Canada.

He graduated with a B.Com. from Karachi University (St. Patrick's College) in 1967.He obtained a CA degree from the Canadian Institute of Chartered Accountants in 1972 and has worked with Ernst & Young for 9 years and then as a Director-General with Auditor General of Canada until 1986. Since then he has been a senior advisor with Saudi Arabian Monetary Agency.
