= Ishwar Maraj =

Canadian cricketer (born 1969)

Cricket information
- Batting: Left-handed
- Bowling: Right-arm off break

Career statistics
Competition	ODI	List A
Matches	6	21
Runs scored	98	281
Batting average	19.60	14.05
100s/50s	0/1	0/1
Top score	53*	53*
Balls bowled	27	163
Wickets	0	3
Bowling average	–	39.66
5 wickets in innings	–	0
10 wickets in match	–	0
Best bowling	–	2/36
Catches/stumpings	2/–	5/–
- Source: Cricket Archive (subscription required)

Ishwar Maraj (born January 26, 1969) is a Canadian cricketer. He is a left-handed batsman and a right-arm offbreak bowler.

Before his move to Canada he played club cricket in Trinidad and Tobago. He holds the world record for the slowest ever fifty in a World Cup match, in an innings against South Africa, in the 2003 Cricket World Cup, in which he played in all six matches. He last game for Canada was in the 2004 ICC 6 Nations Challenge, although he did play for Canada A against the MCC in 2005. He played for St Lucia in the 2006 Stanford 20/20 tournament.

In February 2020, he was named in the West Indies' squad for the Over-50s Cricket World Cup in South Africa. However, the tournament was cancelled during the third round of matches due to the coronavirus pandemic.
