= Kevin Sandher =

Canadian cricketer (born 1980)

Personal information
- Born: 16 July 1980 (age 46); Vancouver, British Columbia, Canada
- Batting: Right-handed
- Bowling: Slow left arm orthodox

Career statistics
Competition	ODI
Matches	15
Runs scored	35
Batting average	5.83
100s/50s	0/0
Top score	12
Balls bowled	696
Wickets	18
Bowling average	31.61
5 wickets in innings	0
10 wickets in match	0
Best bowling	3/24
Catches/stumpings	1/–
- Source: ESPNcricinfo, 12 September 2024

Kevin Talvinder Sandher (born 16 July 1980) is a former Canadian cricketer. He made his debut for Canada against Barbados in the 1999–2000 Red Stripe Bowl on 30 October 1999. His One Day International debut came on 16 May 2006 against Zimbabwe in Trinidad. He also represented a combined Americas team in the Under 19 World Cup in 2000.
