= John Valentine (cricketer) =

Canadian cricketer (born 1954)

Personal information
- Full name: John Nugent Valentine
- Born: 20 September 1954 (age 72); Montreal, Quebec, Canada
- Batting: Left-handed
- Bowling: Left-arm medium
- Relatives: Barry Valentine (father)

International information
- National side: Canada (1979)
- ODI debut (cap 10): 9 Jun 1979 v Pakistan
- Last ODI: 6 Jun 1979 v Australia

Career statistics
Competition	ODIs
Matches	3
Runs scored	3
Batting average	–
100s/50s	0/0
Top score	3*
Balls bowled	114
Wickets	3
Bowling average	22.00
5 wickets in innings	0
10 wickets in match	0
Best bowling	1/18
Catches/stumpings	1/–
- Source: ESPNCricinfo, 17 September 2020

John Nugent Valentine (born 20 September 1954) is a Canadian former cricketer, a left-arm medium-pace bowler who was the first player to take a wicket for Canada in a One Day International. In terms of batting, he was decidedly a tail-ender, and in nine matches at ODI and ICC Trophy level his highest score was 3 not out. He played domestic cricket in Canada for Ottawa, Ontario.

Valentine appeared in Canada's runner-up 1979 ICC Trophy team with some success; he took nine wickets at 15.88, though never more than two in a single innings. He also played in his country's 1979 World Cup side, opening the bowling and removing Pakistan's opening batsman Majid Khan for 1. Valentine played two other matches for the outclassed Canadian team in that tournament, against England (taking the wicket of captain Mike Brearley) and Australia (claiming the scalp of Rick Darling). He now works as a technology teacher in Ashbury College.

Valentine's father, Barry Valentine, played cricket for Cambridge University and later became the Bishop of Rupert's Land in Canada.

== Sources ==
- Adams, P. (2010) A history of Canadian cricket, lulu.com. ISBN 978-1-4466-9652-1.
