= Nicholas Ifill =

Canadian cricketer

Personal information
- Born: 24 November 1968 (age 57); Bridgetown, St. Michael, Barbados
- Batting: Right-handed
- Bowling: Right-arm medium
- Role: All-rounder

International information
- National side: Canada
- ODI debut (cap 26): 23 February 2003 v West Indies
- Last ODI: 6 August 2006 v Kenya

Career statistics
Competition	ODI	FC	LA	ICC T
Matches	4	2	7	2
Runs scored	16	88	29	2
Batting average	5.33	22.00	4.83	1.00
100s/50s	0/0	0/1	0/0	0/0
Top score	9	83	11	1
Balls bowled	72	48	180	78
Wickets	0	0	4	1
Bowling average	–	–	38.50	67.00
5 wickets in innings	–	–	0	0
10 wickets in match	–	–	0	0
Best bowling	–	–	3/22	1/47
Catches/stumpings	2/–	0/–	3/–	0/–
- Source: CricketArchive (subscription required), 23 July 2009

Nicholas Ifill (born November 24, 1968) is a Barbadian-born Canadian cricketer. He is a right-handed batsman and a right-arm medium-pace bowler.

He played in the 1988–89 Under-19s World Cup in Australia, and was a standby for Canada for the 1997 ICC Trophy. Playing for Canada against Bermuda in the 2000 Americas Cup, he took 3 for 78 and earned himself the man of the match award.

He played in the 2000 Red Stripe Bowl, including matches against Trinidad and Tobago, against whom he conceded only 11 runs in 7 overs, and the US, against whom he obtained figures of 3 for 22, figures which include a hat trick. He currently plays for Victoria Park in the Toronto and District League.

He played three matches for Canada in the 2003 Cricket World Cup, but has played just three times for them since, twice in the 2005 ICC Intercontinental Cup and a One Day International against Kenya in 2006.
