= Ian Billcliff =

Canadian-New Zealand cricketer

Personal information
- Full name: Ian Shaw Billcliff
- Born: 26 October 1972 (age 54); Williams Lake, British Columbia, Canada
- Batting: Right-handed
- Bowling: Right-arm medium
- Role: Batsman
- Relatives: Mark Billcliff (brother)

International information
- National side: Canada (2003–2010)
- ODI debut (cap 15): 11 February 2003 v Bangladesh
- Last ODI: 19 April 2009 v Ireland
- T20I debut (cap 27): 9 February 2010 v Netherlands
- Last T20I: 16 November 2010 v Kenya

Domestic team information
- Years: Team
- 1990/91–1994/95: Otago
- 1995/96: Wellington
- 1997/98–1998/99: Auckland

Career statistics
Competition	ODI	T20I	FC	LA
Matches	19	2	46	91
Runs scored	529	51	1,964	2,301
Batting average	27.84	25.50	24.55	27.39
100s/50s	0/4	0/0	2/9	1/17
Top score	93	37	126	102*
Balls bowled	–	–	109	30
Wickets	–	–	1	0
Bowling average	–	–	61.00	–
5 wickets in innings	–	–	0	–
10 wickets in match	–	–	0	–
Best bowling	–	–	1/7	–
Catches/stumpings	7/–	0/–	28/–	25/–
- Source: ESPNcricinfo, 30 April 2020

Ian Shaw Billcliff (born 26 October 1972) is a Canadian former cricketer. Although born in Canada, he grew up in New Zealand.

Billcliff made his debut in first-class cricket in 1991 for Otago in New Zealand domestic cricket, and in 1992 he played twice for the New Zealand Under-19 team. He later played for Wellington from 1995 to 1997, and then for Auckland from 1997 to 1999. After leaving Auckland, he played club cricket in England in the Surrey League.

Billcliff became interested in playing a season in Canada and got in contact with the Canadian cricket president via an ICC Development Manager. Having revealed his place-of-birth, he was immediately chosen for Canada's squad in the 2001 ICC Trophy, and was an important part of the team who achieved a third-place finish, thus progressing to the World Cup. He made important contributions in the World Cup matches, including a 42 in the match against Bangladesh, and a 71 in the match against Kenya.

Between the 2003 World Cup and 2007 World Cup he played just two One Day Internationals for Canada, against Bermuda in August 2006. He did feature for Canada in other tournaments, including the 2005 ICC Trophy, the ICC Americas Championship in 2004 and 2006, and the 2004 ICC Intercontinental Cup where he captained the team.

Billcliff continued to play cricket in New Zealand, but only in club cricket in Auckland where he has played for Cornwall. In the 2006–07 season, he played for the newly formed University/Ellerslie club, a merger between Auckland University Cricket Club and Ellerslie Cricket Club.
