= Martin Stead =

Canadian cricketer (born 1958)

Personal information
- Born: 1 June 1958 (age 68); Vancouver, British Columbia, Canada
- Batting: Right-handed
- Bowling: Right-arm medium

International information
- National side: Canada (1979)
- ODI debut (cap 8): 9 June 1979 v Pakistan
- Last ODI: 13 June 1979 v England

Career statistics
Competition	ODI
Matches	2
Runs scored	10
Batting average	5.00
100s/50s	0/0
Top score	10
Balls bowled	29
Wickets	0
Bowling average	–
5 wickets in innings	–
10 wickets in match	–
Best bowling	–
Catches/stumpings	0/–
- Source: ESPNcricinfo, 17 September 2020

Martin Peter Stead (born June 1, 1958) is a Canadian former cricketer. He played two One Day Internationals for Canada in the 1979 Cricket World Cup.
