= Vasbert Drakes =

West Indian cricketer

Personal information
- Full name: Vasbert Conniel Drakes
- Born: 5 August 1969 (age 57); Springhead, Saint Andrew, Barbados
- Batting: Right-handed
- Bowling: Right-arm fast
- Role: All rounder
- Relatives: Dominic Drakes (son)

International information
- National side: West Indies (1995–2004)
- Test debut (cap 246): 8 December 2002 v Bangladesh
- Last Test: 16 January 2004 v South Africa
- ODI debut (cap 72): 8 March 1995 v Australia
- Last ODI: 25 January 2004 v South Africa

Domestic team information
- Years: Team
- 1991–2004: Barbados
- 1996–1997: Sussex
- 1996–2003: Border
- 1999: Nottinghamshire
- 2001: Warwickshire
- 2003: Leicestershire

Career statistics
Competition	Test	ODI	FC	LA
Matches	12	34	164	217
Runs scored	386	94	4,774	1,787
Batting average	21.44	7.83	21.12	15.40
100s/50s	0/1	0/0	4/17	1/1
Top score	67	25	180*	104
Balls bowled	2,617	1,640	31,528	10,447
Wickets	33	51	614	279
Bowling average	41.27	25.35	26.16	26.10
5 wickets in innings	1	2	28	4
10 wickets in match	0	0	3	0
Best bowling	5/93	5/33	8/59	5/19
Catches/stumpings	2/–	5/–	53/–	36/–
- Source: Cricket Archive, 21 September 2017

Vasbert Conniel Drakes (born 5 August 1969) is a former West Indian cricketer, who played Tests and ODIs. He was a right-arm fast bowler and handy right-hand lower order batsman.

Drakes featured for Sussex, Nottinghamshire, Warwickshire, Leicestershire and Border in his cricketing career. He also coached the UAE, Barbados and the West Indies women's cricket team. Drakes led the West Indies women's cricket team to their first major title by winning the 2016 ICC Women's World Twenty20 in India.

== International career ==
Drakes made his international debut in 1994–95, when he played 5 ODI games against Australia cricket team, followed by a tour of England. He did not return to the side until the age of 33, when in September 2002 he was named in the West Indies cricket team' squad for the 2002 ICC Champions Trophy.

He took the wicket of Jacques Kallis in his first international over for seven years. He went on to make his test debut, on 8 December 2002, against Bangladesh at Dhaka's Bangabandhu National Stadium. Drakes then took 5 wickets against Australia in the first test of the 2003 Frank Worrel Trophy series played at Bourda. This was his first and only five wicket haul in test match cricket. With the bat he scored a notable unbeaten 27 which helped the Windies to chase down a world-record target of 418, set by Australia cricket team in the fourth test of the series played at the Antigua Recreation Ground. He later made 67 in a test match played in and against South Africa. This was his first and only half century in international cricket.

Drakes also featured in the 2003 ICC World Cup where he took a spectacular diving catch in a game against Canada. He eventually picked up a sum of 51 wickets at an average of 25.35 with two five wicket hauls in his ODI career.

== Domestic career ==
Drakes played county cricket for English sides Sussex, Nottinghamshire, Warwickshire and Leicestershire. He scored two centuries for Sussex and picked up 80 wickets in his first and only season with Nottinghamshire. He also featured for South African club Border, with Drakes twice being named, in 1999 and 2000, as one of the South African Cricketers of the Year.

Drakes is also one of only six batsmen in the history of first-class cricket to be given out timed out. As he wasn't in the country at the time, his flight to South Africa, to attend a match played between Border and Free State, had been delayed by several hours.

== Coaching career ==
After his cricketing career, Drakes was appointed coach of United Arab Emirates national cricket team for a three-month period that included the 2008 Asia Cup and 2008 ACC Trophy Elite. Then he took over coaching for Barbados cricket team. He was also briefly the coach of Queen's Park Cricket Club.

In April 2015, Drakes was named head coach of West Indies women's cricket team. He led the West Indies women's cricket team to their first major title by winning the 2016 ICC Women's World Twenty20 in India.

== Personal life ==
Drakes's son, Dominic Drakes is also a cricketer who's a left arm seamer.
