= Christopher Chappell =

Canadian cricketer (born 1955)

Personal information
- Full name: Christopher James David Chappell
- Born: 17 July 1955 (age 71); Toronto, Canada
- Batting: Right-handed

International information
- National side: Canada
- ODI debut (cap 1): 9 June 1979 v Pakistan
- Last ODI: 16 June 1979 v Australia

Career statistics
Competition	ODI
Matches	3
Runs scored	38
Batting average	12.66
100s/50s	0/0
Top score	19
Catches/stumpings	0/–
- Source: ESPNcricinfo, 17 September 2020

Christopher James David Chappell (born 17 July 1955) is a Canadian former cricketer: a right-handed batsman who opened the batting for the Canadian team in their first ever One Day International, played against Pakistan at the 1979 World Cup, and had two further ODI appearances, both in the same tournament.

Chappell was born in Toronto. Prior to his appearance at the World Cup, during the 1979, Chappell had made his ICC Trophy debut against Malaysia, but was run out without scoring. In all he played six times in that competition, with his highest score of 35 being made in the final defeat against Sri Lanka. He made one final ICC Trophy appearance in the 1990 tournament, like his first against Malaysia, scoring 3 not out.
