= Robert Callender =

Canadian cricketer (born 1950)

Cricket information
- Batting: Right-handed
- Bowling: Right-arm medium-fast

International information
- National side: Canada
- ODI debut (cap 12): 13 June 1979 v England
- Last ODI: 16 June 1979 v Australia
- Source: ESPNcricinfo, 17 September 2020

Robert Grantley Callender (born 2 November 1950) is a former cricketer. He represented Canada in the 1979 Cricket World Cup. Appearing in two matches in the tournament, he took a wicket against England but failed to score any runs.
