= Franklyn Dennis =

Jamaican-born Canadian cricketer (born 1947)

Cricket information
- Batting: Right-handed

International information
- National side: Canada (1979)
- ODI debut (cap 2): 9 June 1979 v Pakistan
- Last ODI: 16 June 1979 v Australia

Career statistics
Competition	ODI
Matches	3
Runs scored	47
Batting average	15.66
100s/50s	0/0
Top score	25
Catches/stumpings
- Source: ESPNcricinfo, 17 September 2020

Franklyn Anthony Dennis (born 26 September 1947) is a former cricketer for Canada. Born in Jamaica, he played three One Day Internationals in the 1979 World Cup, as well as appearing for the country in the 1979 ICC Trophy tournament. In the World Cup, in the match against England at Old Trafford, he scored 21 out of the team's total of 45 all out; none of his team-mates made more than five.

He was the second player in ICC Cricket World Cup history after the West Indian Roy Fredericks to be dismissed hit wicket.
