= Barry Seebaran =

Canadian cricketer (born 1972)

Personal information
- Born: September 12, 1972 (age 54); Vancouver, British Columbia, Canada
- Batting: Left-handed
- Bowling: Slow left-arm orthodox

Career statistics
Competition	ODI	List A
Matches	4	19
Runs scored	4	45
Batting average	4.00	7.50
100s/50s	0/0	0/0
Top score	4*	10
Balls bowled	108	770
Wickets	1	15
Bowling average	130.00	32.20
5 wickets in innings	0	0
10 wickets in match	0	0
Best bowling	1/61	3/32
Catches/stumpings	1/0	6/–
- Source: CricketArchive, October 13, 2023

Barry Seebaran (born September 12, 1972) is a Canadian cricketer. He was a left-arm orthodox spin bowler, with the ability to bowl an effective arm ball.

Born in Vancouver, British Columbia, the son of a former player, Seebaran first played for the National team in 1989 and was selected a year later for the 1990 ICC Trophy in the Netherlands, justifying his position at such an early age by being the best spinner in the tournament. He represented Canada from 1989 to 2003 including Canada vs USA Test Matches, 4 ICC World Cups, Shell Sandals Tournaments in Jamaica and St Lucia, the 1998 Commonwealth Games in Malaysia and his last appearance was One Day International cricket for Canada at the 2003 World Cup. His most notable bowling spell was 3 for 23 vs India, including the wickets of Sachin Tendulkar and Rahul Dravid. He currently resides in Queensland, Australia, teaching English and PE at Dalby Christian College before leaving in 2022. His current occupation entails instructing English and Hockey sessions at Livingstone Christian College.
