= Tyson Gordon =

Canadian cricketer

Personal information
- Full name: Tyson George Gordon
- Born: 31 January 1982 (age 44); Saint Mary, Jamaica
- Batting: Left-handed
- Bowling: Right-arm fast-medium
- Relatives: Andre Creary (half-brother)

International information
- National side: Canada (2011-2012)
- ODI debut (cap 72): 20 February 2011 v Sri Lanka
- Last ODI: 7 March 2011 v Kenya
- T20I debut (cap 36): 18 March 2012 v Afghanistan
- Last T20I: 23 March 2012 v Scotland

Domestic team information
- Years: Team
- 2004/05: Jamaica

Career statistics
Competition	ODI	T20I	FC	LA
Matches	5	3	2	7
Runs scored	27	32	59	135
Batting average	5.40	10.66	14.75	19.28
100s/50s	0/0	0/0	0/0	0/1
Top score	9	23	42	70
Balls bowled	15	–	–	57
Wickets	0	–	–	1
Bowling average	–	–	–	70.00
5 wickets in innings	–	–	–	0
10 wickets in match	–	–	–	0
Best bowling	–	–	–	1/33
Catches/stumpings	2/–	1/–	2/–	2/–
- Source: Cricinfo, 27 January 2025

Tyson George Gordon (born 31 January 1982) is a Jamaican-born former Canadian international cricketer. Gordon is left-handed batsman who bowls right-arm fast-medium, and who currently plays international cricket for Canada. He was born in Saint Mary, Jamaica.

Gordon played a single List A match for his native Jamaica against the touring South Africans in May 2005. In his maiden List A match he scored 70 runs before being dismissed by Shaun Pollock. This was the highest score in the Jamaican innings. He later moved to Canada and made his senior debut for Canada against Trinidad and Tobago in the 2010 Caribbean Twenty20. Gordon played in the following season's competition, playing all of Canada's fixtures in the tournament. Tyson was selected as part of Canada's 2011 ICC Cricket World Cup squad, having only qualified to play international cricket days before the tournament.

Gordon made his One Day International and List A debut for Canada against Sri Lanka at the Mahinda Rajapaksa International Stadium. Gordon made 4 runs from 10 balls in the match, being dismissed by Nuwan Kulasekara. This set the picture for a disappointing tournament with the bat for Gordon, with his average after four ODI's just 5.75.
