= Jimmy Hansra =

Canadian cricketer (born 1984)

Personal information
- Full name: Amarbir Singh Hansra
- Born: 29 December 1984 (age 41); Ludhiana, India
- Nickname: Jimmy
- Batting: Right-handed
- Bowling: Right-arm slow
- Role: All-rounder

International information
- National side: Canada (2010-2014)
- ODI debut (cap 71): 1 July 2010 v Afghanistan
- Last ODI: 28 January 2014 v Netherlands
- T20I debut (cap 31): 23 March 2012 v Scotland
- Last T20I: 16 November 2013 v Netherlands
- T20I shirt no.: 68

Domestic team information
- Years: Team
- 2005: Abbotsford

Career statistics
Competition	ODI	FC	LA	T20
Matches	24	8	32	30
Runs scored	421	231	712	417
Batting average	23.38	17.76	29.66	19.85
100s/50s	0/2	0/2	1/2	0/1
Top score	70*	67	100*	58*
Balls bowled	445	462	662	308
Wickets	7	5	11	17
Bowling average	59.00	59.40	52.18	20.88
5 wickets in innings	0	0	0	0
10 wickets in match	0	0	0	0
Best bowling	3/27	3/77	3/27	3/22
Catches/stumpings	7/–	6/–	12/–	5/–
- Source: ESPNcricinfo, 28 January 2014

Amarbir Singh "Jimmy" Hansra (born 29 December 1984) is a Canadian cricketer born in Ludhiana, India.

He is a middle-order batsman and occasional offspinner. He began playing cricket at a very young age at school, and had an interest in the sport throughout his childhood. He has said that his father, who also has a passion for cricket, laid the foundations for his profound interest in cricket.

Hansra was announced as captain for the Canada national cricket team starting his captaincy for the ICC Americas' T20 Tournament taking place 17–25 July 2011 in Fort Lauderdale, Florida, where he proved his worth by winning the tournament.
