= Henry Osinde =

Canadian cricketer

Personal information
- Full name: Henry Osinde
- Born: 17 October 1978 (age 48); Kampala, Uganda
- Height: 6 ft 4 in (1.93 m)
- Batting: Right-handed
- Bowling: Right-arm medium-fast
- Role: Bowler

International information
- National side: Canada (2005–2013)
- ODI debut (cap 34): 16 May 2006 v Zimbabwe
- Last ODI: 13 March 2013 v Kenya
- T20I debut (cap 8): 2 August 2008 v Netherlands
- Last T20I: 16 March 2013 v Kenya

Domestic team information
- Years: Team
- 2009/10: Tamil Union Cricket and Athletic Club

Career statistics
Competition	ODI	T20I	FC	LA
Matches	42	11	23	59
Runs scored	64	31	283	79
Batting average	4.26	7.75	11.32	4.38
100s/50s	0/0	0/0	0/1	0/0
Top score	21*	17	60*	21*
Balls bowled	1,692	210	3,647	2,262
Wickets	45	10	68	62
Bowling average	30.86	25.00	28.57	29.56
5 wickets in innings	0	0	2	0
10 wickets in match	–	–	0	–
Best bowling	4/26	3/36	7/53	4/26
Catches/stumpings	11/–	7/–	5/–	16/–
- Source: ESPNcricinfo, 16 November 2022

Henry Osinde (born 17 October 1978) is a Canadian cricket coach and former player. He immigrated to Canada from Uganda as a young man and represented the Canada national cricket team from 2005 to 2013 as a fast-medium bowler. He played at the 2007 and 2011 Cricket World Cups. He was made the interim head coach of Canada in 2017.

== Personal life ==
Osinde was born on 17 October 1978 in Kampala, Uganda. He attended Busoga College Mwiri where he was introduced to cricket at the age of 15. He later attended Makerere University, before immigrating to Canada in 2001. Outside of cricket, he worked as an accountant.

== Playing career ==
After moving to Canada, Osinde began playing in the Toronto & District Cricket Association. Six feet four inches tall and strongly built, he was able to generate substantial bounce with his pace bowling. He was selected in Canada's squad for the 2005 ICC Trophy in Ireland, ironically making his international debut in a warm-up game against Uganda.

Osinde made his first-class debut for Canada against Bermuda in the 2005 Intercontinental Cup. In his second match he recorded 7/53 against Cayman Islands. Later in the year he was one of four Canadians selected to attend the ICC Winter Training Camp (WTC) in South Africa along with players from other associate countries. He was assessed by WTC head coach Andy Moles as being "along with Ireland's Eoin Morgan [...] the player with perhaps most potential among those here at the WTC".

At the 2007 Cricket World Cup in the West Indies, Osinde played three games but failed to take a wicket. He returned for the 2011 Cricket World Cup where he took career-best ODI figures of 4/26 against Kenya and was named man of the match. He played his final matches for Canada in 2013.

== Coaching career ==
In 2017, Osinde was appointed as interim head coach of Canada in place of Davy Jacobs. He coached the team at 2017 ICC World Cricket League Division Three in Uganda. He was also an assistant coach of ICC Americas at the 2016–17 Regional Super50.
