= Charles Baksh =

Canadian cricketer (born 1940)

Personal information
- Born: 15 March 1938 (age 88); Trinidad and Tobago
- Batting: Right-handed

International information
- National side: Canada (1979)
- Only ODI (cap 13): 16 June 1979 v Australia

Career statistics
Competition	ODI
Matches	1
Runs scored	0
Batting average	0.00
100s/50s	0/0
Top score	0
Catches/stumpings	0/–
- Source: Cricinfo, 26 December 2021

Showkat Baksh, also known as Charles Baksh (born 15 March 1938) is a Canadian former cricketer, who played for the Canadian cricket team. A right-handed batsman, Baksh made only two appearances at a high level, both in June 1979: a match against Fiji in the ICC Trophy and another (his only One Day International) against Australia at Birmingham in the World Cup two weeks later.
