= Cornelius Henry =

Canadian cricketer and rugby union player

Personal information
- Full name: Cornelius Cyprian Henry
- Born: 16 September 1956 (age 70); St Lucia
- Batting: Right-handed
- Bowling: Right-arm medium

International information
- National side: Canada
- ODI debut (cap 3): 9 June 1979 v Pakistan
- Last ODI: 16 June 1979 v Australia
- Source: ESPNcricinfo, 17 September 2020

Cornelius Cyprian Henry (born 16 September 1956) is a Canadian former cricketer and rugby union player. He played in the 1979 Cricket World Cup where he took two wickets against Australia. He then played rugby for Canada in the 1980s and cricket in the Ottawa Valley Cricket Council for Bel Air CC.
