= Abdul Sattaur =

Canadian cricketer (1965–2023)

Personal information
- Full name: Abdul Fazil Sattaur
- Born: April 6, 1965; British Guiana
- Died: 18 September 2023 (aged 58)
- Batting: Right-handed

International information
- National side: Canada

Career statistics
Competition	ODI
Matches	3
Runs scored	20
Batting average	6.66
100s/50s	0/0
Top score	13
Catches/stumpings	2/0
- Source: ESPNcricinfo, 23 March 2006

Abdul Fazil Sattaur (April 6, 1965 - September 18, 2023) was a Canadian cricketer who played as a wicketkeeper. Born in British Guiana, he played three One Day Internationals for Canada. He was sometimes referred to as Fazil Sattaur or Fazil Samad.
