= Harvir Baidwan =

Canadian cricketer (born 1987)

Personal information
- Full name: Harvir Singh Baidwan
- Born: 31 July 1987 (age 39); Chandigarh, India
- Height: 6 ft 1 in (1.85 m)
- Batting: Right-handed
- Bowling: Right-arm medium
- Role: All-rounder

International information
- National side: Canada (2008–2014)
- ODI debut (cap 54): 28 June 2008 v Bermuda
- Last ODI: 28 January 2014 v Netherlands
- ODI shirt no.: 7
- T20I debut (cap 2): 2 August 2008 v Netherlands
- Last T20I: 26 November 2013 v Kenya

Domestic team information
- Years: Team
- 2009/10: Colts Cricket Club

Career statistics
Competition	ODI	T20I	FC	LA
Matches	32	17	9	49
Runs scored	220	54	102	332
Batting average	14.66	6.00	17.00	14.43
100s/50s	0/0	0/0	0/1	0/0
Top score	33	21	50	38*
Balls bowled	1,551	323	846	2,180
Wickets	44	27	16	58
Bowling average	30.63	15.22	26.62	32.15
5 wickets in innings	0	0	0	0
10 wickets in match	0	0	0	0
Best bowling	3/19	4/19	4/16	3/19
Catches/stumpings	9/–	7/–	0/–	13/–
- Source: ESPNcricinfo, 28 January 2014

Harvir Singh Baidwan (born 31 July 1987) is an Indian-born cricketer who has played One Day Internationals, Twenty20 International and first-class cricket for Canada.

He was born in Chandigarh. He made his ODI debut in 2008 against Bermuda.
