= Rizwan Cheema =

Canadian cricketer (born 1978)

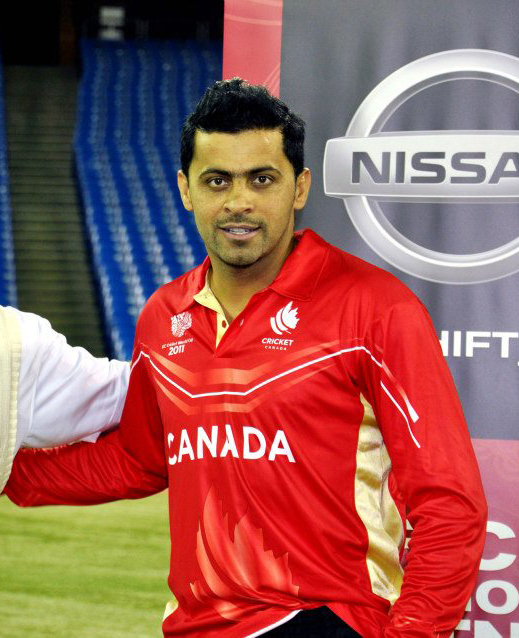

Personal information
- Full name: Rizwan Ahmed Cheema
- Born: 15 August 1978 (age 48); Gujrat, Punjab, Pakistan
- Nickname: Cheema
- Batting: Right-handed
- Bowling: Right arm medium
- Role: All-rounder

International information
- National side: Canada (2008–2019)
- ODI debut (cap 61): 18 August 2008 v Bermuda
- Last ODI: 6 September 2010 v Ireland
- T20I debut (cap 19): 10 October 2008 v Pakistan
- Last T20I: 24 October 2019 v Hong Kong

Domestic team information
- Years: Team
- 2012: Duronto Rajshahi
- 2016: Capricorn Commanders

Career statistics
Competition	ODIs	T20I
Matches	33	16
Runs scored	764	238
Batting average	24.64	15.86
100s/50s	0/6	0/1
Top score	94	68
Balls bowled	1,330	300
Wickets	32	9
Bowling average	34.21	42.44
5 wickets in innings	0	0
10 wickets in match	0	0
Best bowling	3/25	2/19
Catches/stumpings	15/–	8/–
- Source: ESPNcricinfo, 28 April 2020

Rizwan Ahmed Cheema (born 15 August 1978) is a former cricketer of the Canadian cricket team. Cheema is a big-hitting batsman who also bowls medium pace.

== Early career ==
He was born in Muslim Jat family in Pakistan. Cheema moved to Canada in the early 2000s and had only ever played cricket at club level but his heavy hitting caught attention in the Toronto and District Cricket Association league.

== Domestic and T20 franchise career ==
He turned in a noteworthy season in 2005, scoring 627 runs in 14 matches at just under 50, and taking 24 wickets at 13.12.

After a disappointing 2006, Cheema established himself as the league's most dangerous batsman the following year with two big hundreds, a 161 off 61 balls with eight fours and 15 sixes and a 145 with 15 fours and nine sixes.

In 2010, Canada was included in Caribbean T20, the T20 tournament in the West Indies. Due to Ashish Bagai’s injury, Cheema was named as captain for the tournament which also involves seven teams from the Caribbean.

His Canadian team surprised everyone by winning a stirring encounter with England domestic Twenty20 Champions Hampshire cricket club.

He has also made the shortlist for the 2010 IPL contract auction; he is one of 51 people to do so from an original list of 97.

On 3 June 2018, he was selected to play for the Winnipeg Hawks in the players' draft for the inaugural edition of the Global T20 Canada tournament. In June 2019, he was selected to play for the Vancouver Knights franchise team in the 2019 Global T20 Canada tournament. In June 2021, he was selected to take part in the Minor League Cricket tournament in the United States following the players' draft.

== International career ==
Cheema made his international debut at the age of 30 in the Scotia Bank ODI series in King City, Ontario in August 2008.

Cheema came to notice with a 61-ball 89 against West Indies in his second ODI and in the same match also took 3 for 31 in 10 overs which was over shadowed by West Indies cricket team's 303 for 4 which includes century by Xavier Marshall. He followed that up with 61 off 45 balls against the same opposition two days later.

He narrowly misses out in a maiden ODI hundred against Netherlands cricket team in July 2009. Later that month Cheema was one of six players awarded central contracts as Cricket Canada sought to professionalise its structures.

His in ODI is 114.94 which is the top ten list of the highest number of strike rate. In the Canada T20 tournament, in October 2008, he hit ten sixes, more than either Sanath Jayasuriya or Shahid Afridi and was his team's top run-getter, averaging over 60 in the series. He scored 68 off 43 balls against Sri Lanka in his third game.

Cheema was one of the four, Canadian Cricketer who face visa problem before the World Cup. Cheema hit a fluent 93 from 70 balls from No. 7 at Fatullah in a warm cup game against England.

In September 2018, he was named in Canada's squad for the 2018–19 ICC World Twenty20 Americas Qualifier tournament. In August 2019, he was named in Canada's squad for the Regional Finals of the 2018–19 ICC T20 World Cup Americas Qualifier tournament. In October 2019, he was named in Canada's squad for the 2019 ICC T20 World Cup Qualifier tournament in the United Arab Emirates.

== Captaincy career ==
Cheema was named Ashish Bagai’s deputy for the Canada Tour of Sri Lanka in 2009. He was appointed captain of the national side for the ICC America's Division One Championship 2009/10 in Bermuda in Ashish Bagai's absence that has been rested ahead of what is to be a gruelling push to the 2011 Cricket World Cup.

He was appointed as full-time captain of Canada in 2012 where he leads them in 2012 ICC World Twenty20 Qualifier in UAE where Canada finish Sixth in the tournament.
