= List of Canadian first-class cricketers =

This is a list of Canadian first-class cricketers. First-class cricket matches are those between international teams or the highest standard of domestic teams in which teams have two innings each. Generally, matches are eleven players a side but there have been exceptions. Today all matches must be scheduled to have at least three days' duration; historically, matches were played to a finish with no pre-defined timespan. This list is not limited to those who have played first-class cricket for Canada and may include Canadian players who played their first-class cricket elsewhere. The list is in alphabetical order.

Name	Career Span	Matches	Teams
Derek Abraham	1973–1976	4	Windward Islands
Crosbie Baber	1913	1	Combined Canada/USA XI
Ashish Bagai	2004–2006	7	Canada
P. H. Barnes	1951	1	Canada
Geoff Barnett	2004–2006	17	Canada, Central Districts
Timothy Bevington	1900–1913	14	AJ Webbe's XI, Combined Canada/USA XI, MCC, Middlesex County Cricket Club, PF Warner's XI
Latchman Bhansingh	1985–1989	2	Berbice
Ian Billcliff	1991–2006	45	Auckland, Canada, Otago, Wellington
Lawrence Black	1903–1919	4	Hampshire
Kenneth Branker	1951–1956	2	Barbados
Tom Brierley	1931–1954	232	Canada, Glamorgan, Lancashire
Garnet Brisbane	1959–1962	4	Combined Islands, Windward Islands
Edmund Burn	1954	2	Canada
Jimmy Cameron	1946–1959	21	Canada, Jamaica, West Indies
David Chapman	1876–1877	2	Cambridge University
Brian Christen	1951–1954	5	Canada
Desmond Chumney	2004–2006	3	Canada
Austin Codrington	2004	3	Canada
George Codrington	2005	2	Canada
Thomas Dale	1883	1	USA
Pubudu Dassanayake	1990–2006	108	Bloomfield Cricket and Athletic Club, Canada, Central Province, Colts Cricket Club, Sri Lanka, Sri Lanka A, Sri Lanka Board President's XI, Sri Lanka Board Under-23s XI, Sri Lanka Board XI, Sri Lanka Under-24s
John Davison	1995–2006	50	Canada, South Australia, Victoria
Nicholas de Groot	1995–2004	34	Canada, Guyana, West Indies Board XI
Sunil Dhaniram	1993–2006	20	Canada, Guyana
Haninder Dhillon	2004–2006	5	Canada
Muneeb Diwan	1994	1	Essex
Marshall D'Souza	1962–1964	5	Karachi B, Karachi Blues
Arthur Farmer	1834–1839	10	Cambridge University, Cambridge Town Club, MCC, Surrey
J. A. Gerrard	1951	1	Canada
Archibald Gibson	1913	1	Combined Canada/USA XI
Cuthbert Godwin	1926	2	Somerset
F. I. C. Goodman	1913	1	Combined Canada/USA XI
Lewis Gunn	1951–1954	2	Canada
E. Hall	1894	1	Players of the USA
Joseph Harris	1989	2	Barbados
Stewart Heaney	2006	2	Canada
Percy Henderson	1913	1	Combined Canada/USA XI
Arthur Hendy	1951–1954	4	Canada
Frank Henry	1882	1	Middlesex
Harold Heygate	1903–1919	6	Sussex
Edward Hull	1902–1911	9	Jamaica, Jamaican Born
Henry Humphries	1906–1913	2	Combined Canada/USA XI, Somerset
Nicholas Ifill	2005	2	Canada
Peter Iles	1947–1952	2	Auckland
Rohan Jayasekera	1979–1982	8	Sri Lanka, Sri Lanka Board President's XI, Sri Lanka Under-25s
Sandeep Jyoti	2006	1	Canada
Farooq Kirmani	1972–1975	17	Karachi Blues, Karachi Whites, Sind, Sind B
John Lucas	1946–1954	15	Barbados, Canada
Brian Magee	1954	1	Canada
Ganesh Mahabir	1976–1988	33	East Trinidad, North and East Trinidad, Shell Shield XI, Trinidad & Tobago, West Indies Board President's XI
Bryan Mauricette	1967–1972	4	Windward Islands
Don Maxwell	2004–2006	7	Canada
Charles Mayo	1928	6	Somerset County Cricket Club
Jerome Mellow	1965–1967	7	Combined Islands, Windward Islands
Francis Morice	1886–1890	4	Wellington
Asif Mulla	2004–2006	3	Canada
Clement Neblett	1973–1978	6	Demerara, Guyana
Edward Ogden	1883	1	USA
Henry Osinde	2005–2006	5	Canada
Paul Owen	1990	3	Canada
Hal Padmore	1951–1954	3	Canada
Ashish Patel	2004	3	Canada
Jason Patraj	2004	1	Canada
Alan Percival	1951–1954	5	Canada
George Pitts	1914	2	Middlesex
Walter Price	1904	3	Worcestershire
Ravishankar Puvendran	2006	2	Canada
Qaiser Ali	2005–2006	5	Canada
Robert Quintrell	1954	4	Canada
Brian Rajadurai	1988–1991	31	Sinhalese Sports Club, Sri Lankan cricket team, Sri Lanka A, Sri Lanka B
Danny Ramnarais	1983–1987	3	Berbice, Guyana
Hugh Reid	1913	1	Combined Canada/USA XI
Thomas Rilstone	1951–1954	3	Canada
Basil Robinson	1947–1954	24	Canada, Oxford University
Abdool Samad	2006	1	Canada
Kevin Sandher	2004–2006	6	Canada
Abdul Sattaur	1984–1990	10	Berbice, Guyana
Stuart Saunders	1913	1	Combined Canada/USA XI
Glenroy Sealy	1965	1	Barbados
Shiv Seeram	1985	1	Demerara
Easan Sinnathamby	2004	1	Canada. Born at Point Pedro, Sri Lanka in 1973 and made his debut for Canada in May 2004 against the United States in the ICC Intercontinental Cup. Also played in two games in the 2006 ICC Americas Championship.
Peter Stead	1954	3	Canada
Zubin Surkari	2004–2005	6	Canada
Tariq Javed	1964–1968	5	Karachi Education Board, Karachi University, Karachi Whites
Francis Terry	1882–1885	10	Somerset
Sanjayan Thuraisingam	2004	2	Canada
Dean Trowse	1952–1955	22	South Australia
Umar Bhatti	2004–2006	8	Canada
Major-General Sir Casimir Cartwright van Straubenzee, KBE, CB, CMG	1899	1	MCC
Nesbit Wallace	1863–1885	6	Gentlemen of the South, Gloucestershire, Hampshire, MCC
Osmond Wallace	1904	1	Trinidad
Steven Welsh	2006	1	Canada
Robert Wilson	1956–1957	13	Free Foresters, Oxford University
Herbert Wookey	1913	1	Combined Canada/USA XI
Walter Wright	1879–1899	289	Kent, MCC, Nottinghamshire plus 16 other teams.
Alfred Young	1890	1	Kent
Zahid Hussain	1994–2004	6	Canada, Habib Bank Limited, Sargodha
Saad Bin Zafar	2008	2	Canada, ICC Americas

== See also ==
- Canadian cricket team
- List of Canadian ODI cricketers
- First-class cricket
