= International cricket in 1979 =

International cricket season

The 1979 international cricket season extended from May to August 1979.

== Season overview ==
International tours
Start date	Home team	Away team	Results [Matches]			
Start date	Home team	Away team	Test	ODI	FC	LA
12 July 1979	England	India	1–0 [4]	—	—	—
International tournaments
Start date	Tournament				Winners	
22 May 1979	(England) 1979 ICC Trophy				Sri Lanka	
9 June 1979	(England) 1979 Prudential World Cup				West Indies	

== May ==
=== 1979 ICC Trophy ===
Group A

Pos	Team	P	W	L	NR	Ab	RR	Pts
1	Bermuda	4	3	0	0	1	4.064	14
2	East Africa	4	2	1	1	0	2.258	10
3	Papua New Guinea	4	1	1	2	0	2.717	8
4	Singapore	4	1	2	0	1	2.146	6
5	Argentina	4	0	3	1	0	2.261	2

Group B

Pos	Team	P	W	L	NR	Ab	RR	Pts
1	Denmark	4	4	0	0	0	2.742	16
2	Canada	4	3	1	0	0	3.092	12
3	Bangladesh	4	2	2	0	0	2.654	8
4	Fiji	4	0	3	0	1	2.626	2
5	Malaysia	4	0	3	0	1	2.558	2

Group C

Pos	Team	P	W	L	NR	Ab	RR	Pts
1	Sri Lanka	4	2	1	0	1	3.820	10
2	Wales	4	2	1	0	1	3.277	10
3	United States	4	2	1	0	1	3.022	10
4	Netherlands	4	1	2	0	1	2.726	6
5	Israel	4	1	3	0	0	2.110	4

Group stage
No.	Date	Team 1	Captain 1	Team 2	Captain 2	Venue	Result
ICCT 1	22 May	Argentina	Christopher Nino	Singapore	Pritam Singh	Pickwick Cricket Club Ground, Birmingham	Singapore by 1 wicket
ICCT 2	22–23 May	Papua New Guinea	Nigel Agonia	East Africa	Narendra Thakker	Fordhouses Cricket Club Ground, Wolverhampton	No result
ICCT 3	22–23 May	Canada	Garnet Brisbane	Malaysia	Rasiah Ratnalingham	Warwick Cricket Club Ground, Warwick	Canada by 44 runs
ICCT 4	22 May	Fiji	Inoke Tambualevu	Denmark	Klaus Buus	Orleton Park, Wellington	Denmark by 8 wickets
ICCT 5	22 May	United States	Anil Lashkari	Israel	Jerrold Kessel	Blossomfield Cricket Club Ground, Solihull	United States by 41 runs
ICCT 6	22–23 May	Wales	David Jones	Netherlands	Chris van Schouwenburg	Enville Cricket Club Ground, Stourbridge	Wales by 15 runs (revised)
ICCT 7	24 May	Argentina	Christopher Nino	East Africa	Narendra Thakker	Bulls Head Ground, Coventry	East Africa by 5 wickets
ICCT 8	24 May	Papua New Guinea	Nigel Agonia	Bermuda	Gladstone Brown	Amblecote, Stourbridge	Bermuda by 7 wickets
ICCT 9	24 May	Bangladesh	Raqibul Hasan	Fiji	Inoke Tambualevu	Water Orton Cricket Club Ground, Birmingham	Bangladesh by 22 runs
ICCT 10	24 May	Malaysia	Rasiah Ratnalingham	Denmark	Klaus Buus	Chester Road North Ground, Kidderminster	Denmark by 7 wickets
ICCT 11	24 May	Israel	Jerrold Kessel	Netherlands	Chris van Schouwenburg	Banbury Twenty Cricket Club Ground, Banbury	Netherlands by 8 wickets
ICCT 12	24 May	United States	Anil Lashkari	Sri Lanka	Anura Tennekoon	Northampton Saints Cricket Club Ground, Northampton	Sri Lanka by 6 wickets
ICCT 13	24 May	Argentina	Christopher Nino	Papua New Guinea	Nigel Agonia	Banbury Twenty Cricket Club Ground, Banbury	No result
ICCT 13a	29–30 May	Bermuda	Anil Lashkari	Singapore	Pritam Singh	Fordhouses Cricket Club Ground, Wolverhampton	Match abandoned
ICCT 14	29 May	Canada	Garnet Brisbane	Bangladesh	Raqibul Hasan	Lichfield Cricket Club Ground, Lichfield	Canada by 49 runs
ICCT 14a	29–30 May	Fiji	Inoke Tambualevu	Malaysia	Rasiah Ratnalingham	Leamington Cricket Club Ground, Leamington Spa	Match abandoned
ICCT 14b	29–30 May	Netherlands	Chris van Schouwenburg	United States	Anil Lashkari	Kenilworth Wardens Cricket Club Ground, Kenilworth	Match abandoned
ICCT 14c	29–30 May	Sri Lanka	Anura Tennekoon	Wales	David Jones	Leicester Road, Hinckley	Match abandoned
ICCT 15	31 May-1 June	Argentina	Christopher Nino	Bermuda	Anura Tennekoon	Haden Hill Park, Old Hill	Bermuda by 9 wickets
ICCT 16	31 May	Singapore	Pritam Singh	East Africa	Anura Tennekoon	London Road, Shrewsbury	East Africa cricket team by 5 wickets
ICCT 17	31 May-1 June	Malaysia	Rasiah Ratnalingham	Bangladesh	Raqibul Hasan	Gorway Ground, Walsall	Bangladesh by 7 wickets
ICCT 18	31 May-1 June	Denmark	Anil Lashkari	Canada	Garnet Brisbane	Knowle and Dorridge Cricket Club Ground, Dorridge	Denmark by 46 runs
ICCT 19	31 May-1 June	Wales	David Jones	Israel	Jerrold Kessel	Astwood Bank Cricket Club Ground, Redditch	Wales by 91 runs
ICCT 20	31 May-1 June	Sri Lanka	Anura Tennekoon	Netherlands	Chris van Schouwenburg	Scorers, Shirley	Netherlands by 45 runs
ICCT 21	4 June	East Africa	Charanjive Sharma	Bermuda	Anura Tennekoon	Bournville Cricket Ground, Bournville	Bermuda by 9 wickets
ICCT 22	4 June	Papua New Guinea	Nigel Agonia	Singapore	Pritam Singh	West Bromwich Dartmouth Cricket Club Ground, West Bromwich	Papua New Guinea by 87 runs
ICCT 23	4 June	Denmark	Klaus Buus	Bangladesh	Raqibul Hasan	Kings Heath Cricket Club Ground, Solihull	Denmark by 10 runs
ICCT 24	4 June	Canada	Bryan Mauricette	Fiji	Inoke Tambualevu	Solihull Cricket Club Ground, Solihull	Canada by 56 runs
ICCT 24a	4 June	Israel	Jerrold Kessel	Sri Lanka	Anura Tennekoon	Kenilworth Wardens Cricket Club Ground, Kenilworth	Israel by walkover
ICCT 25	4 June	United States	Anil Lashkari	Wales	David Jones	Olton and West Warwickshire Cricket Club Ground, Solihull	United States by 8 runs
Semi finals
No.	Date	Team 1	Captain 1	Team 2	Captain 2	Venue	Result
ICCT 26	6 June	Sri Lanka	Anura Tennekoon	Denmark	Klaus Buus	Mitchells and Butlers' Ground, Birmingham	Sri Lanka by 208 runs
ICCT 27	6 June	Bermuda	Bryan Mauricette	Canada	Garnet Brisbane	Allied Breweries Ground, Burton-on-Trent	Canada by 4 wickets
Final
No.	Date	Team 1	Captain 1	Team 2	Captain 2	Venue	Result
ICCT 28	21 June	Sri Lanka	Anura Tennekoon	Canada	Garnet Brisbane	New Road, Worcester	Sri Lanka by 60 runs

== June ==
=== 1979 Cricket World Cup ===
Pos	Team	Pld	W	L	T	NR	Pts	RR
1	England	3	3	0	0	0	12	3.066
2	Pakistan	3	2	1	0	0	8	3.602
3	Australia	3	1	2	0	0	4	3.164
4	Canada	3	0	3	0	0	0	1.606

Source: ESPNcricinfo

Pos	Team	Pld	W	L	T	NR	Pts	RR
1	West Indies	3	2	0	0	1	10	3.928
2	New Zealand	3	2	1	0	0	8	3.553
3	Sri Lanka	3	1	1	0	1	6	3.558
4	India	3	0	3	0	0	0	3.128

Source: ESPNcricinfo

Group stage
No.	Date	Team 1	Captain 1	Team 2	Captain 2	Venue	Result
ODI 61	9 June	India	Srinivas Venkataraghavan	West Indies	Clive Lloyd	Edgbaston Cricket Ground, Birmingham	West Indies by 9 wickets
ODI 62	9 June	New Zealand	Mark Burgess	Sri Lanka	Anura Tennekoon	Trent Bridge, Nottingham	New Zealand by 9 wickets
ODI 63	9 June	England	Mike Brearley	Australia	Kim Hughes	Lord's, London	England by 6 wickets
ODI 64	9 June	Canada	Bryan Mauricette	Pakistan	Asif Iqbal	Headingley Cricket Ground, Leeds	Pakistan by 8 wickets
ODI 64a	13 June	Sri Lanka	Anura Tennekoon	West Indies	Clive Lloyd	Kennington Oval, London	Match abandoned
ODI 65	13 June	India	Srinivas Venkataraghavan	New Zealand	Mark Burgess	Headingley Cricket Ground, Leeds	New Zealand by 8 wickets
ODI 66	13–14 June	Australia	Kim Hughes	Pakistan	Asif Iqbal	Trent Bridge, Nottingham	Pakistan by 89 runs
ODI 67	13–14 June	England	Mike Brearley	Canada	Bryan Mauricette	Old Trafford Cricket Ground, Manchester	England by 8 wickets
ODI 68	16–18 June	India	Srinivas Venkataraghavan	Sri Lanka	Bandula Warnapura	Old Trafford Cricket Ground, Manchester	Sri Lanka by 47 runs
ODI 69	16 June	New Zealand	Mark Burgess	West Indies	Clive Lloyd	Trent Bridge, Nottingham	West Indies by 32 runs
ODI 70	16 June	Australia	Kim Hughes	Canada	Bryan Mauricette	Edgbaston Cricket Ground, Birmingham	Australia by 7 wickets
ODI 71	16 June	England	Mike Brearley	Pakistan	Asif Iqbal	Headingley Cricket Ground, Leeds	England by 14 runs
Semi-finals
No.	Date	Team 1	Captain 1	Team 2	Captain 2	Venue	Result
ODI 72	20 June	England	Mike Brearley	New Zealand	Mark Burgess	Old Trafford Cricket Ground, Manchester	England by 9 runs
ODI 73	20 June	Pakistan	Asif Iqbal	West Indies	Clive Lloyd	Kennington Oval, London	West Indies by 43 runs
Final
No.	Date	Team 1	Captain 1	Team 2	Captain 2	Venue	Result
ODI 74	23 June	England	Mike Brearley	West Indies	Clive Lloyd	Lord's, London	West Indies by 92 runs

== July ==
=== India in England ===
Test Series
No.	Date	Home captain	Away captain	Venue	Result
Test 851	12–16 July	Mike Brearley	Srinivas Venkataraghavan	Edgbaston Cricket Ground, Birmingham	England by an innings and 83 runs
Test 852	2–7 August	Mike Brearley	Srinivas Venkataraghavan	Lord's, London	Match drawn
Test 853	16–21 August	Mike Brearley	Srinivas Venkataraghavan	Headingley Cricket Ground, Leeds	Match drawn
Test 854	30 Aug–4 September	Mike Brearley	Srinivas Venkataraghavan	Kennington Oval, London	Match drawn
