= List of Canada national cricket captains =

This is a list of all cricketers who have captained Canada in an official international match. This includes the ICC Trophy, Under-19's games and One Day Internationals. The table is correct as of the 2007 Cricket World Cup. The current captain of Canadian national team is Saad Bin Zafar, he was appointed as the captain in October 2022.

== One Day Internationals ==
Canada played their first ODI on June 9, 1979.

Canadian ODI Captains
No.	Name	Year	Played	Won	Tied	Lost	NR
1	Bryan Mauricette	1979	3	0	0	3	0
2	Joseph Harris	2003	6	1	0	5	0
3	John Davison	2006–2007	19	4	0	15	0
4	George Codrington	2006	4	2	0	2	0
5	Ashish Bagai	2007–2014	27	8	0	18	1
6	Sunil Dhaniram	2007–2008	5	1	0	4	0
7	Zubin Surkari	2008	1	0	0	1	0
8	Qaiser Ali	2008	2	1	0	1	0
9	Umar Bhatti	2009	1	0	0	0	1
11	Jimmy Hansra	2011–2014	7	0	0	7	0
12	Saad Bin Zafar	2023–Present	17	8	0	8	1
13	Nicholas Kirton	2024–2025	14	4	1	8	1
14	Navneet Dhaliwal	2025	4	0	0	4	0
Overall			110	29	1	76	4

== Twenty20 Internationals ==
Canada played their first Twenty20 Internationals on August 2, 2008.

Canadian T20I Captains
No.	Name	Year	Played	Won	Tied	Lost	NR
1	Sanjayan Thuraisingam	2008	3	2	0	1	0
2	Sunil Dhaniram	2008	4	0	1	3	0
3	Ashish Bagai	2008–2013	4	1	0	3	0
4	Rizwan Cheema	2010–2013	8	1	0	7	0
5	Navneet Dhaliwal	2019–2025	29	21	1	6	1
6	Saad Bin Zafar	2022–Present	19	11	0	8	0
7	Nicholas Kirton	2024–2025	19	12	0	6	1
8	Dilpreet Bajwa	2026	4	0	0	4	0
Overall			90	48	2	38	2

== ICC Trophy ==
Canada debuted in the ICC Trophy in the 1979 tournament

Canadian ICC Trophy Captains
Number	Name	Year	Played	Won	Tied	Lost	No Result
1	Garnet Brisbane	1979	4	2	0	2	0
2	Bryan Mauricette	1979	2	2	0	0	0
3	Richard Stevens	1982	3	2	0	1	0
4	Clement Neblett	1986	8	5	0	3	0
5	Farooq Kirmani	1990	6	3	0	3	0
6	Danny Singh	1993–1994	6	2	0	3	1
7	Ingleton Liburd	1993–1997	8	5	0	2	1
8	Joseph Harris	2001	10	6	0	4	0
9	John Davison	2005	7	5	0	2	0
Overall			54	32	0	20	2

== Youth One-Day International captains ==
This is a list of Canadian cricketers who have captained their country in an Under-19's ODI.

Canadian Under 19's Captains
Number	Name	Year	Played	Won	Tied	Lost	No Result
1	Ashish Bagai	2002	5	0	1	4	0
2	Nathan Richards	2002	1	0	0	1	0
3	Umar Bhatti	2004	6	0	0	6	0
4	Rustam Bhatti	2010	5	2	0	2	1
5	Nitish Kumar	2014	6	1	0	5	0
Overall			23	3	1	18	1
