= Barbadian Canadians =

Canadian citizens of Barbadian descent

Barbadian Canadians Bajan Canadians
Total population
- 13,665 (by birth, 2021 Census)

Regions with significant populations
- Ontario, Quebec, Manitoba, Alberta and British Columbia

Languages
- English, Bajan Creole

Religion
- Christianity, Hinduism, Islam, Obeah

Related ethnic groups
- Indo-Canadians, Chinese Canadians, Black Canadians

Barbadian Canadian or Bajan Canadians are Canadian citizens of Barbadian descent or Barbados-born people who reside in Canada. According to the 2016 Census 37,780 Canadians claimed full or partial Barbadian ancestry. Barbadian Canadians have the highest median income and the lowest incidence of poverty among Black Canadian groups. Barbadians first start migrating to Nova Scotia in the early 1900s settling largely in the neighbourhood of Whitney Pier in Sydney. In Cape Breton, they established chapters of the United Negro Improvement Association and the African Orthodox Church.

== History ==
The Immigration Act of 1952 in Canada had certain provisions that limited Black immigration. However, in 1955, without any dependents, in good health, and with at least an eighth-grade education were eligible for landed immigrant status upon committing to one year of domestic service. This program remained in effect until 1967, when the nonracial Points-based immigration system was introduced to determine immigrant qualifications. As a result of this program, approximately 1,000 Barbadian women were able to immigrate to Canada. Subsequently, over 2,000 Barbadian immigrants who were granted Canadian citizenship in the mid-70s were immigrants who entered Canada between 1966-1975. During the period from 1973 to 1978, there was a significant increase in Caribbean immigration to Canada. West Indians accounted for over 10 percent of all immigrants during this time. Among them, a considerable portion were Barbadians who primarily sought economic prospects.

== Barbadian Canadians by Canadian province or territory (2016) ==
Province	Population	Percentage	Source
Ontario	26,630	0.2%	
Quebec	5,575	0.1%	
Alberta	2,065	0.1%	
British Columbia	1,870	0.0%	
Manitoba	740	0.1%	
Nova Scotia	575	0.1%	
Saskatchewan	110	0.0%	
New Brunswick	100	0.0%	
Newfoundland and Labrador	95	0.0%	
Northwest Territories	10	0.0%	
Nunavut	10	0.0%	
Prince Edward Island	10	0.0%	
Yukon	0	0.0%	
Canada	37,780	0.1%	

== List of notable Barbadian Canadians ==
=== Academics ===
- Miriam Rossi, pediatrician and professor of medicine
- Michael Tudor, professor in emeritus, author, and educator
- Rinaldo Walcott, academic and writer

=== Athletes ===
- Jeffrey Alleyne, boxer
- Fred Brathwaite, ice hockey player
- Aaron Brown, sprinter
- Pierre Browne, sprinter
- Slade Callaghan, jockey
- Roy Callender, bodybuilder and professional wrestler
- Anson Carter, ice hockey player and analyst
- George Codrington, cricketer
- La'Vere Corbin-Ong, soccer player
- Derek Cornelius, soccer player
- Anderson Cummins, cricketer
- Andre De Grasse, sprinter
- Jamar Dixon, soccer player
- Greg Douglas, sailor
- Phil Edwards, middle distance runner
- Ray Emery, ice hockey player
- Crystal Emmanuel, sprinter
- Martyn Forde, swimmer
- Andrew Harris, football player
- Terrence Haynes, swimmer
- Arthur Hendy, cricketer
- Nikkita Holder, sprinter
- Patrick Husbands, jockey
- Simon Husbands, jockey
- Nicholas Ifill, cricketer
- Ferguson Jenkins Sr., baseball player
- Ferguson Jenkins, baseball player
- Jonathan Jones, jockey
- Justyn Knight, long distance runner
- Ian Lowe, track and field athlete
- Don Maxwell, cricketer
- Jamal Mayers, ice hockey player
- Dru Onyx, professional wrestler
- Hal Padmore, cricketer
- Marita Payne, track and field athlete
- Jackson Rowe, basketball player
- Glenroy Sealy, cricketer
- Akil Thomas, ice hockey player
- Fred Thomas, multi-sport athlete
- John Vaughan, cricketer
- Joel Ward, ice hockey player
- Damian Warner, decathlete
- Kevin Weekes, ice hockey player and analyst
- Andrew Wiggins, basketball player

=== Media, film and television ===
- Cameron Bailey, artistic director of the Toronto International Film Festival
- Demore Barnes, actor, Supernatural, The Unit
- Lisa Codrington, actress, Letterkenny
- Rachael Crawford, actress, The Firm, Brewster Place
- Barbada de Barbades, drag performer
- Melyssa Ford, model, actress and television personality
- Isabelle Lucas, actress, The Fosters, You and Me
- Lamar Johnson, actor, The Next Step, The Hate U Give
- Melanie Nicholls-King, actress, The Wire, Rookie Blue
- Jasmine Richards, actress, Camp Rock, Naturally, Sadie
- Kenny Robinson, comedian
- RT!, writer, filmmaker and music video director, Utopia Falls
- Alison Sealy-Smith, actress and voice actress, X-Men: The Animated Series
- Shawn Singleton, actor and musician, The Line, Lord Have Mercy!
- Makyla Smith, actress, Owning Mahowny, Queer as Folk
- Tamara Taylor, actress, Bones

=== Musicians ===
- Daniel Caesar, R&B singer
- Vita Chambers, pop singer
- Oliver Jones, jazz pianist
- Killy, rapper
- Tory Lanez, rapper and singer
- Baka Not Nice, rapper
- Trevor W. Payne, multi-instrumentalist and gospel choir director

=== Politicians ===
- Zanana Akande, former MPP for St. Andrew—St. Patrick and cabinet member
- Frank Baylis, former MP for Pierrefonds—Dollard
- Leonard Braithwaite, former MPP for Etobicoke, first Black person elected to a provincial legislature
- Anne Cools, first Black member of the Senate of Canada
- James Douglas, first governor of the Colony of British Columbia
- James W. Douglas, MLA for Victoria City
- George Prout, MLA for Kildonan and St. Andrews
- Calvin Ruck, senator

=== Writers and authors ===
- Austin Clarke, novelist
- Cecil Foster, novelist and essayist
- Odimumba Kwamdela, writer and spoken word artist
- Robert Edison Sandiford, short story writer and essayist
- Barbara Seagram, writer

=== Other ===
- Edward Mitchell Bannister, Tonalist oil painter
- Harold M. Brathwaite, educator and school administrator
- Alan Emtage, computer scientist
- Joe Fortes, first municipal lifeguard in the City of Vancouver

== See also ==
- Barbadians
- Caribbean Canadians
- Indo-Canadians
- Chinese Canadians
- Barbadian Americans
- Barbadian British
