= Marshall D'Souza =

Pakistani-Canadian cricketer

Personal information
- Born: 30 June 1941; Karachi, Sind Province, British India
- Died: 10 April 2013 (aged 71); Dollard-des-Ormeaux, Quebec, Canada
- Batting: Right-handed
- Bowling: Right-arm off spin
- Role: Bowler
- Relatives: Antao D'Souza (brother); Paul D'Souza (brother)

International information
- National side: Canada (1967–1975)

Domestic team information
- Years: Team
- 1962: Karachi B
- 1964: Karachi Blues

Career statistics
| Competition | FC |
|---|---|
| Matches | 5 |
| Runs scored | 9 |
| Batting average | 2.25 |
| 100s/50s | 0/0 |
| Top score | 5* |
| Balls bowled | 516 |
| Wickets | 8 |
| Bowling average | 22.25 |
| 5 wickets in innings | 0 |
| 10 wickets in match | 0 |
| Best bowling | 3/52 |
| Catches/stumpings | 1/– |
- Source: CricketArchive, 29 April 2015

Marshall D'Souza (or de Souza; 30 June 1941 – 10 April 2013) was a Canadian cricketer. A right-arm off spinner, before emigrating to Canada he played several seasons in Pakistani domestic competitions, including at first-class level. He debuted for the Canadian national side in 1967, with his final international match coming in 1975.

== Career in Pakistan ==
D'Souza was born in Karachi to a Goan Catholic family that had recently left what was then Portuguese India. His older brother, Antao D'Souza, played Test cricket for Pakistan, and another brother, Paul D'Souza, also played first-class cricket. Marshall D'Souza made his first-class debut during the 1962–63 season of the Quaid-i-Azam Trophy, playing four matches for a Karachi B team. He took 1/16 from 10 overs on debut against a Pakistan Universities side, and then 3/52 from 27 overs in the next game against Pakistan Railways, bowling only in one innings in each case. Both matches were concluded in unusual circumstances – Pakistan Universities had only eight batsmen (three being recorded as "absent hurt" in each innings), while Railways' captain, Aslam Khokhar, conceded the match after a single innings each. D'Souza performed well in the semi-final against Rawalpindi, taking 1/12 and 2/19 bowling in tandem with a left-arm spinner, Ziaullah. However, in the tournament final against Karachi A, he finished with 1/74 in Karachi A's only innings, with his side losing by an innings and 163 runs. Opening the bowling for Karachi A in that game was Antao D'Souza, the only time any of the brothers played together in a first-class match.

The fifth and final first-class match D'Souza played came late in the 1963–64 season, a Quaid-i-Azam match for the Karachi Blues against the Lahore Whites at Lahore Stadium. Aged 22 at the time, he went wicketless, bowling only seven overs.

== Career in Canada ==
D'Souza first appeared for the Canadian national side in 1967, playing first against a touring Marylebone Cricket Club (MCC) team, and then in the annual match against the U. S. national side. The match against the MCC was played in the grounds of Rideau Hall, the residence of the Governor General of Canada, and on his national debut D'Souza was Canada's best bowler, with figures of 4/133 from 47 overs. After the 1967 season, he did not appear in another international match until 1973, when he played against Ireland in Toronto.

D'Souza's 1974 season included two matches against Denmark in Toronto, followed by a tour of England in July. Canada's most notable opponents on the tour were the minor counties of Berkshire and Buckinghamshire, as well as the second XIs of Kent, Worcestershire, Warwickshire, and Sussex. D'Souza's best performances were 4/25 against the Sussex 2nd XI and 4/17 against Berkshire. The only other Canadian player with first-class experience on the tour was Garnet Brisbane.

D'Souza's final recorded international match was against the U.S. in 1975, by which time he was 34. His career in Canada had also included occasional interprovincial appearances for Quebec – an especially notable performance was 6/22 against Saskatchewan in 1967, which ensured Quebec won that year's Canadian Cricket Championship.

D'Souza and his wife Bertha (née Fernandes) had two children. He died in Dollard-des-Ormeaux, a suburb of Montreal, in April 2013, having suffered from Parkinson's disease.

== See also ==
- List of Canadian first-class cricketers
