= Herbert Wookey =

Canadian cricketer

Personal information
- Full name: Herbert Gladstone Wookey
- Born: 1888; Canada
- Died: 1953 (aged 64–65); United States
- Batting: Unknown
- Bowling: Unknown

Career statistics
Competition	First-class
Matches	1
Runs scored	2
Batting average	2.00
100s/50s	–/–
Top score	2
Balls bowled	168
Wickets	3
Bowling average	33.00
5 wickets in innings	–
10 wickets in match	–
Best bowling	3/99
Catches/stumpings	–/–
- Source: Cricinfo, 30 January 2022

Herbert 'Bob' Gladstone Wookey (1888 – 1953) was a Canadian first-class cricketer.

Wookey was born in Canada in 1883. A member of the Toronto Cricket Club, he made a single appearance in first-class cricket for a combined Canada and United States of America cricket team against the touring Australians at Toronto in 1913. Playing as a bowler in the Canada/United States side, he took the wickets of Leslie Cody, Percival Arnott and Granville Down for the cost of 99 runs. Batting twice in the match, he was unbeaten without scoring in the Canada/United States first innings of 182 all out, while in their second innings he was dismissed for 2 runs by Charlie Macartney, with the Australians winning the match by an innings and 147 runs. Wookey died in the United States in 1953.
