= Percy Anderson =

Percy Anderson may refer to:

- Henry Percy Anderson (1831–1896), British diplomat
- Percy Anderson (designer) (1851–1928), English stage designer and painter
- Percy Anderson (judge) (born 1948), United States District Judge
- Percy McCuaig Anderson (1879–1948), Saskatchewan lawyer, judge and political figure

== See also ==
- Perry Anderson
- Percy Henderson
