= List of black NHL players =

This is a list of black National Hockey League players.

== List ==
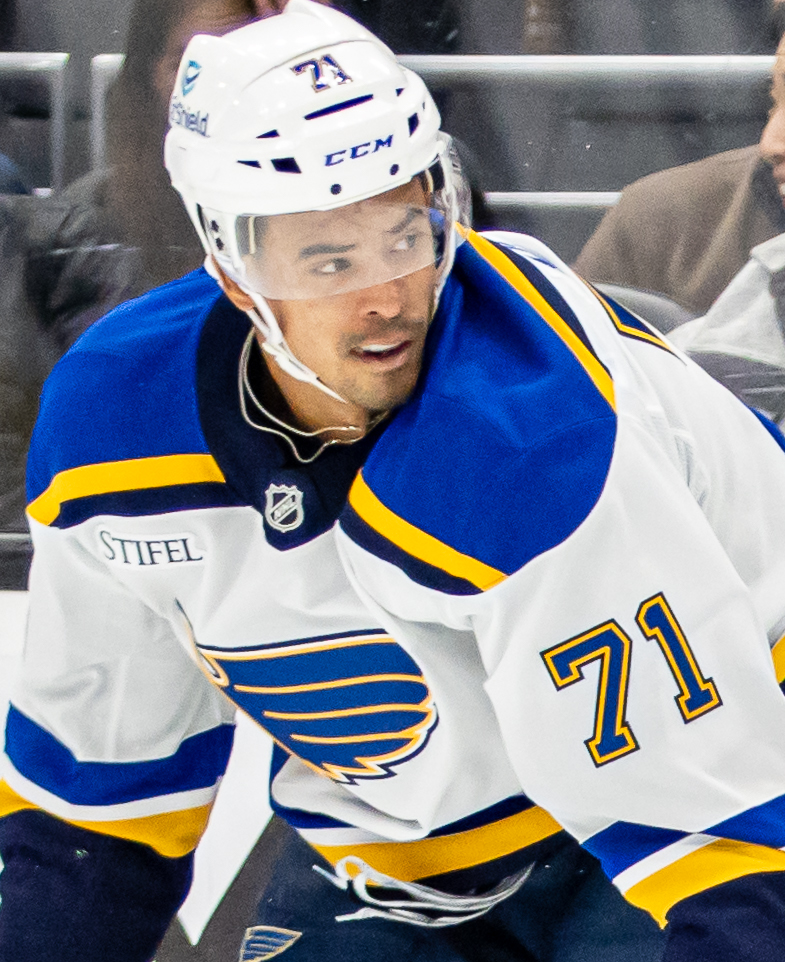
Mathieu Joseph with the St. Louis Blues

Isaiah George with the New York Islanders

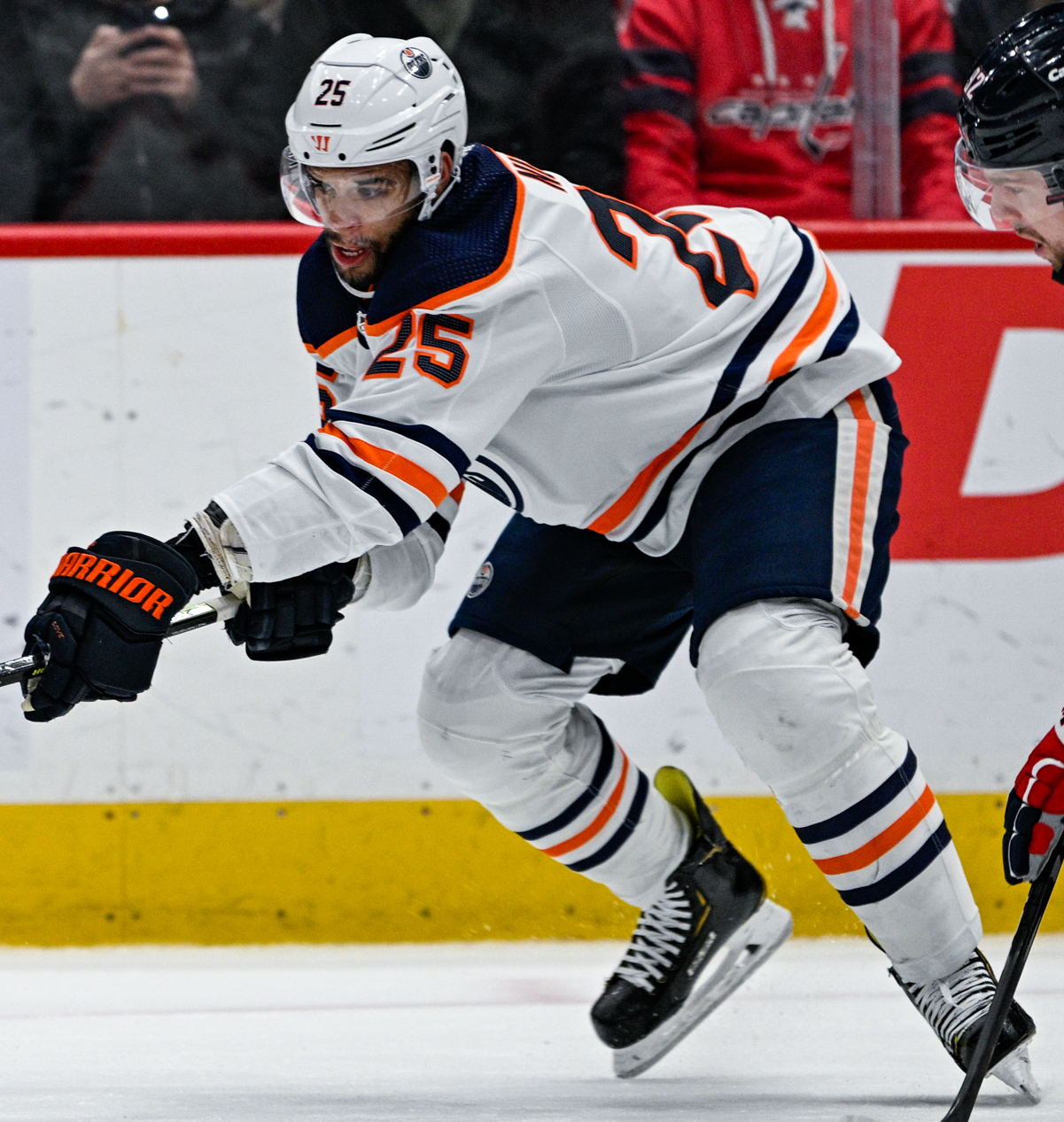
Darnell Nurse with the Edmonton Oilers

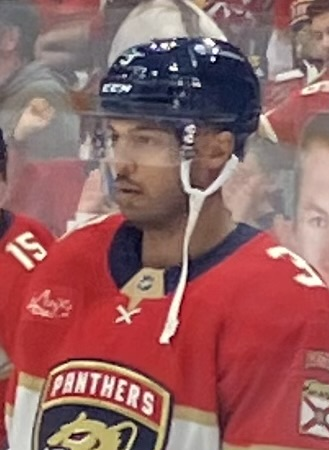
Seth Jones with the Florida Panthers

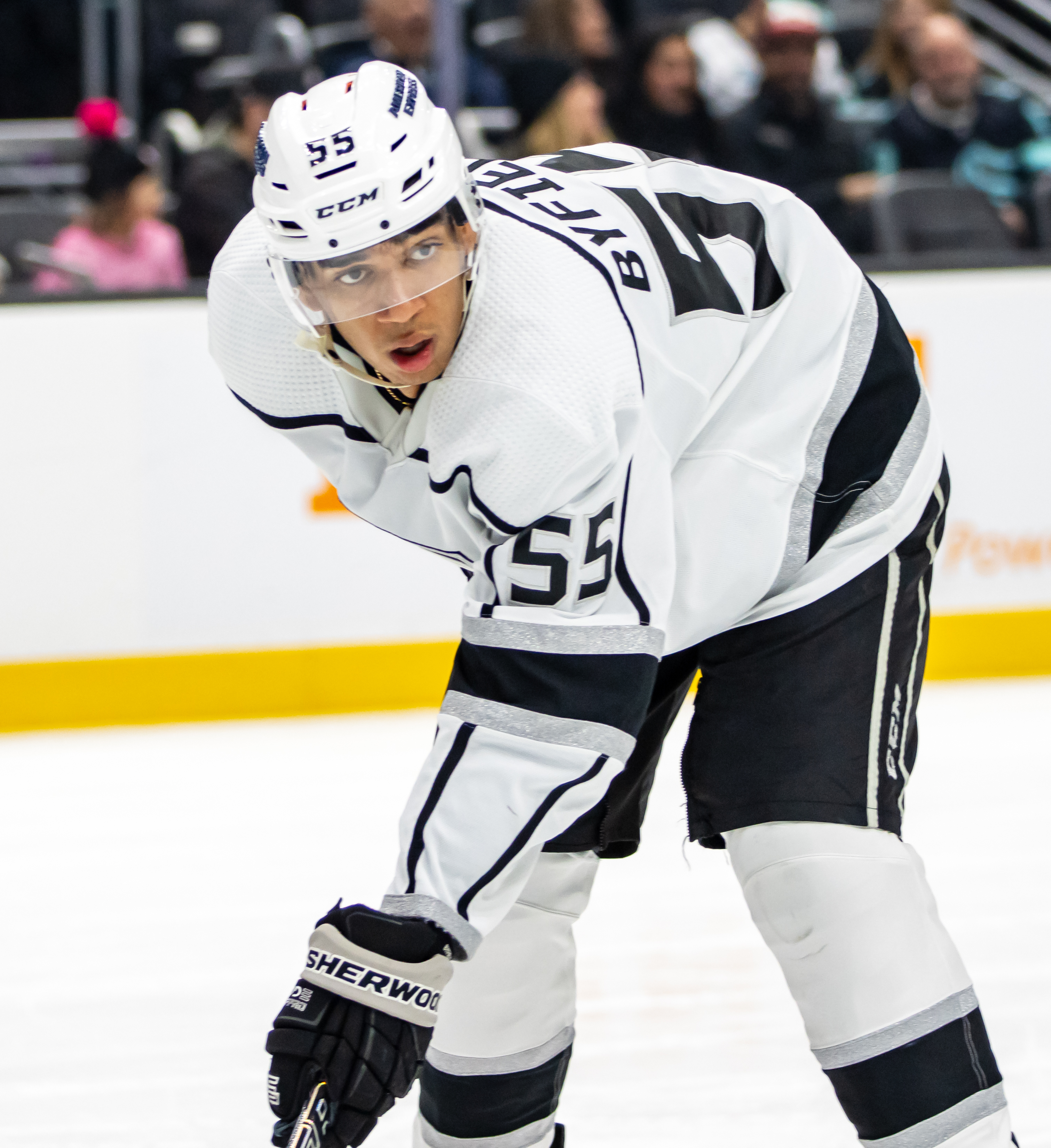
Quinton Byfield with the Los Angeles Kings

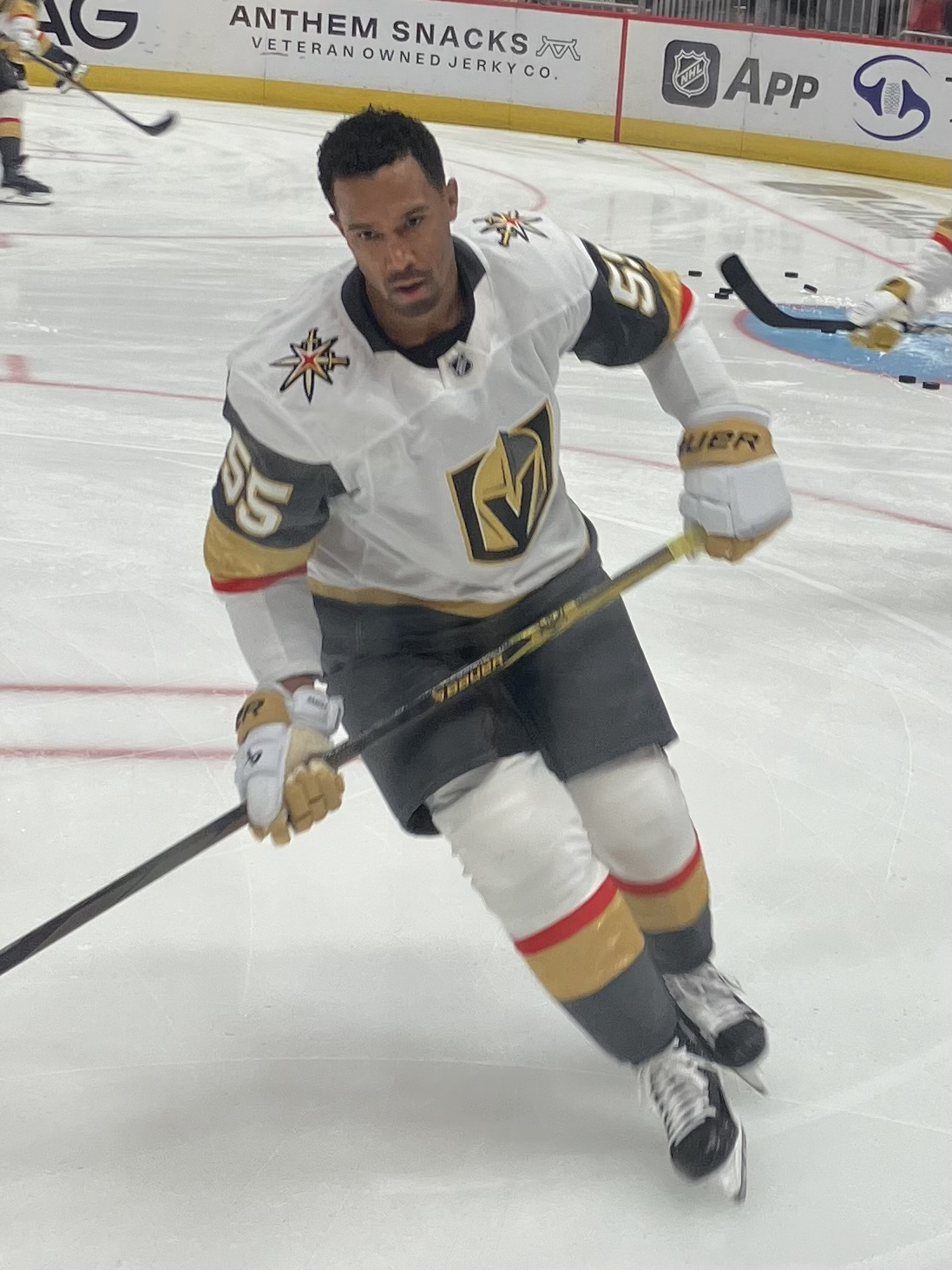
Keegan Kolesar with the Vegas Golden Knights

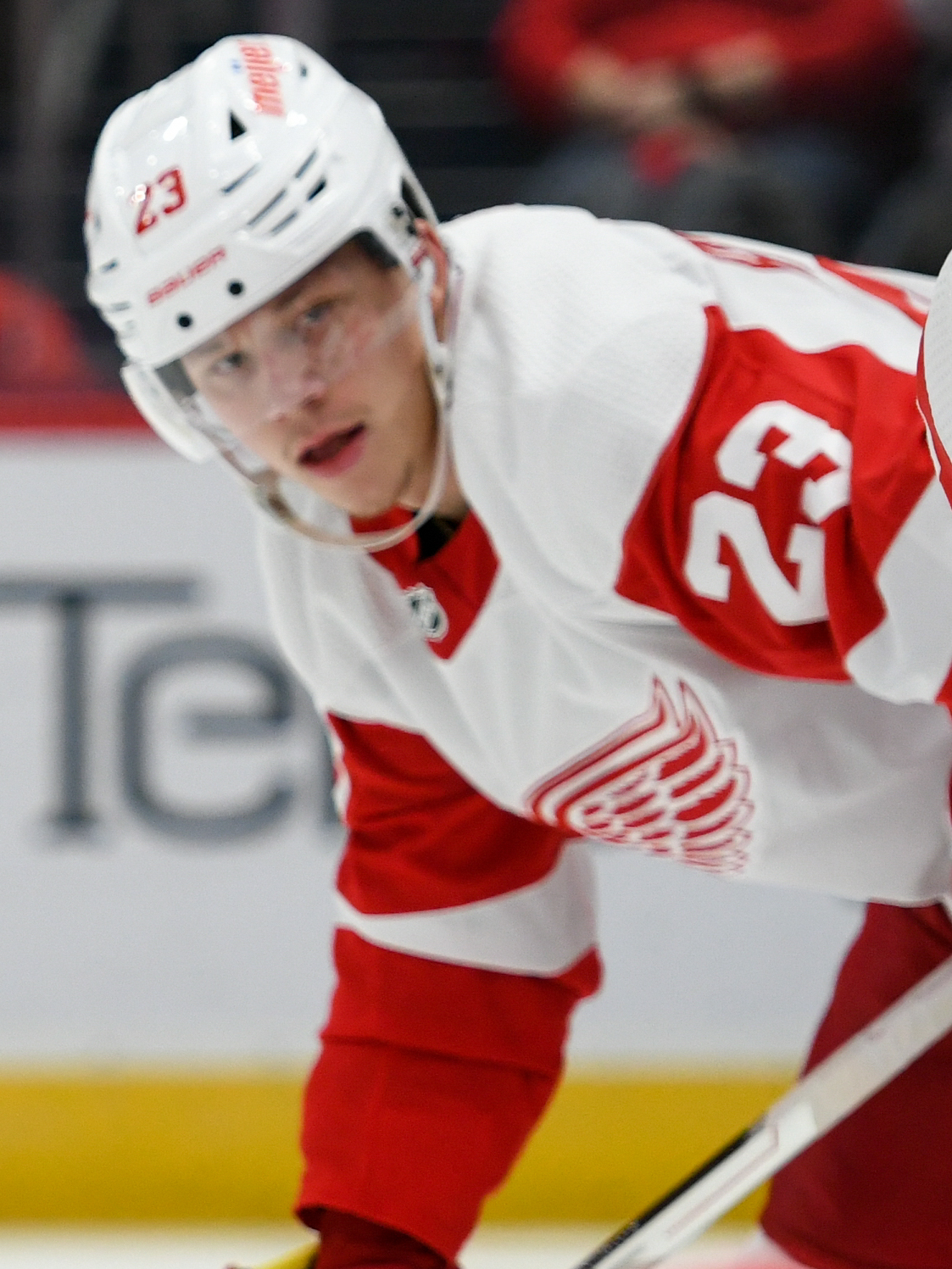
Lucas Raymond with the Detroit Red Wings

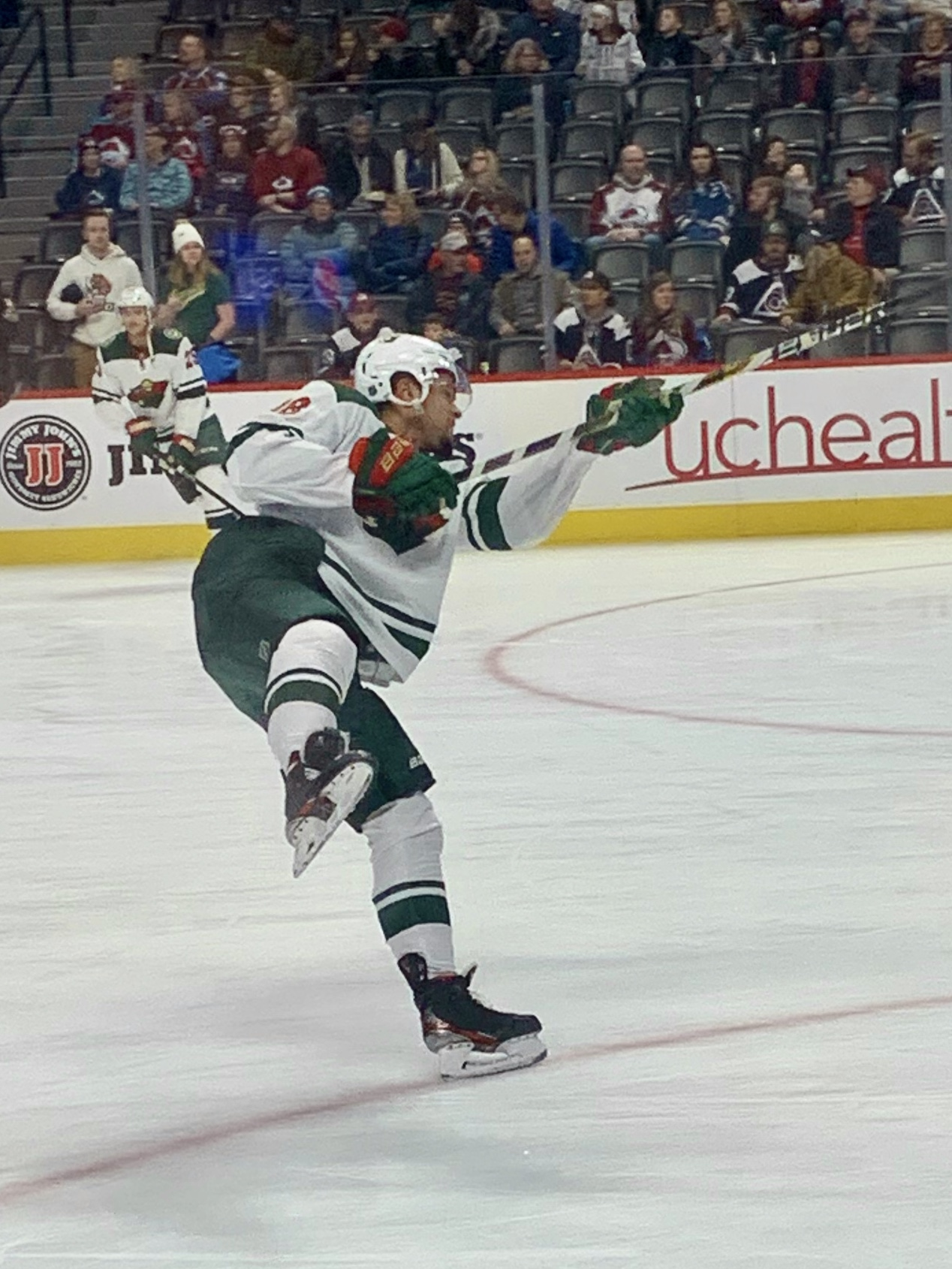
Jordan Greenway with the Minnesota Wild

Players with at least one game of NHL experience:

Names in italics have won the Stanley Cup.
Bold: organization by which player is currently playing
*: Yet to have played an NHL game for his respective team

= NHL All-Star team ·	= NHL All-Star (Note: Players are identified as an All-Star if they were selected for the All-Star game at any time in their career.) ·	= NHL All-Star and NHL All-Star team ·	= Hall of Famers

Black NHL players
Nat.	Name	Birthplace	Pos	Seasons	Teams played	Ethnicity	Ref
(Canada)	Akim Aliu	Okene, Nigeria	RW	2011–2013	CGY	Nigerian-Ukrainian	
(Canada)	Darren Archibald	Newmarket, ON	RW	2013–present	VAN, OTT	Afro-Canadian	
(United States)	Justin Bailey	Buffalo, NY	RW	2015–present	BUF, PHI, VAN, SJS, **ANA***	Bi-racial	
(Canada)	Darren Banks	Toronto, ON	LW	1992–1994	BOS		
(Canada)	Nicholas Baptiste	Ottawa, ON	RW	2016–present	BUF	Haitian	
(Canada)	Chris Beckford-Tseu	Toronto, ON	G	2007–2008	STL	Jamaican-Chinese	
(Canada)	Shawn Belle	Edmonton, AB	D	2006–2011	MIN, MTL, EDM, COL	Barbadian	
(France)	Pierre-Edouard Bellemare	Le Blanc-Mesnil, France	LW	2014–present	PHI, VGK, COL, TBL, SEA	Bi-racial, Martiniquais	
(Canada)	Paul Bissonnette	Welland, ON	LW	2008–2014	PIT, PHX	Bi-racial, his mother is half-black	
(United States)	Francis Bouillon	New York City, NY	D	1999–2014	MTL, NSH	Haitian-French	
(Canada)	Madison Bowey	Winnipeg, MB	D	2017–2022	WSH, DET, CHI, VAN	Bi-racial	
(United States)	Donald Brashear	Bedford, IN	LW	1993–2010	MTL, VAN, PHI, WSH, NYR	Black African-French	
(Canada)	Fred Brathwaite	Ottawa, ON	G	1993–2004	EDM, CGY, STL, CBJ	Barbadian	
(United States)	J. T. Brown	Burnsville, MN	RW	2011–2019	TBL, ANA, MIN	Bi-racial	
(Canada)	Sean Brown	Oshawa, ON	D	1996–2006	EDM, BOS, NJD, VAN		
(Canada)	Quinton Byfield	Newmarket, ON	C	2021–present	**LAK**	Bi-racial, Jamaican	
(United States)	Dustin Byfuglien	Roseau, MN	D	2005–2019	CHI, ATL, WPG	African-Norwegian-Swedish	
(Canada)	Anson Carter	Toronto, ON	RW	1996–2007	BOS, WSH, EDM, NYR, LAK, CAR, VAN, CBJ	Barbadian	
(United States)	Jalen Chatfield	Ypsilanti, MI	D	2021–present	VAN, **CAR**	Bi-racial	
(United States)	Gerald Coleman	Romeoville, IL	G	2005–2006	TBL	Bi-racial	
(Canada)	John Craighead	Vancouver, BC	RW	1996–1997	TOR		
(Canada)	Dale Craigwell	Toronto, ON	C	1991–1994	SJS		
(Canada)	Trevor Daley	Toronto, ON	D	2003–2020	DAL, CHI, PIT, DET	Bi-racial, Jamaican	
(Canada) / (Kazakhstan)	Nigel Dawes	Winnipeg, MB	LW	2006–2011	NYR, PHX, CGY, ATL, MTL	Bi-racial, Jamaican	
(Canada)	Andre Deveaux	Freeport, Bahamas	C	2008–2012	TOR, NYR	Bi-racial, Bahamian	
(Canada)	Jason Doig	Montreal, QC	D	1995–2004	WIN, PHX, NYR, WSH	Jamaican	
(Canada)	Anthony Duclair	Pointe-Claire, QC	LW	2014–present	NYR, ARI, CHI, CBJ, OTT, FLA, SJS, TBL, **NYI**	Haitian	
(United States)	Robbie Earl	Chicago, IL	LW	2007–2011	TOR, MIN	African American	
(Canada)	Ray Emery	Hamilton, ON	G	2002–2015	OTT, PHI, ANA, CHI	Bi-racial	
(United States)	Emerson Etem	Long Beach, CA	RW	2012–2018	ANA, NYR, VAN	Bi-racial	
(Canada)	Steven Fletcher	Montreal, QC	LW/D	1987–1989	MTL, WIN	Bi-racial	
(Canada)	Maxime Fortunus	Longueuil, QC	D	2009–2014	DAL	Haitian	
(Canada)	Mark Fraser	Ottawa, ON	D	2006–2017	NJD, TOR, EDM	Bi-racial, Jamaican	
(Canada)	Grant Fuhr	Spruce Grove, AB	G	1981–2000	EDM, TOR, BUF, LAK, STL, CGY	Bi-racial, Cree	
(Canada)	Joaquin Gage	Vancouver, BC	G	1994–2001	EDM	Haitian	,
(Canada)	Tyrone Garner	Stoney Creek, ON	G	1998–1999	CGY		
(Canada)	Isaiah George	Oakville, ON	D	2024–present	**NYI**	Bi-racial	
(Finland)	Christopher Gibson	Karkkila, Finland	G	2015–present	NYI, TBL	Saint Lucian-Finnish	
(Canada)	Tyrell Goulbourne	Edmonton, AB	LW	2017–2019	PHI	Bi-racial, Jamaican	
(Canada)	Dirk Graham	Regina, SK	RW	1983–1995	MNS, CHI	Bi-racial, Afro-Canadian	
(Canada)	Jean-Luc Grand-Pierre	Montreal, QC	D	1998–2004	BUF, CBJ, WSH, ATL	Haitian	
(Canada)	Jet Greaves	Cambridge, ON	G	2022–present	**CBJ**	Bi-racial	
(United States)	Jordan Greenway	Canton, NY	LW	2017–present	MIN, BUF, **CHI**	Bi-racial	
(United States)	Mike Grier	Detroit, MI	RW	1996–2011	EDM, WSH, SJS, BUF	African American	
(United States)	Jordan Harris	Haverhill, MA	D	2021–present	MTL, CBJ, **BOS**	Bi-racial, his father is half-black	
(Canada)	Josh Ho-Sang	Toronto, ON	RW	2016–2019	NYI	Jamaican-Jewish	
(Canada)	Jarome Iginla	Edmonton, AB	RW	1995–2017	CGY, PIT, BOS, COL, LAK	Bi-racial, Nigerian	
(Canada)	Bokondji Imama	Montreal, QC	LW	2021–present	ARI, OTT, **PIT**	Kongo	
(United States)	Val James	Ocala, FL	LW	1981–1987	BUF, TOR	African American	
(Canada)	Paul Jerrard	Winnipeg, MB	D	1988–1989	MNS	Bi-racial, Jamaican	
(Canada)	Brian Johnson	Montreal, QC	RW	1983–1984	DET		
(United States)	Justin Johnson	Anchorage, AK	RW	2013–2014	NYI	African American	
(United States)	Marc Johnstone	Cranford, NJ	RW	2023–present	PIT	Bi-racial	
(United States)	Caleb Jones	Arlington, TX	D	2018–present	EDM, CHI, COL, LAK, **PIT**	Bi-racial	
(United States)	Seth Jones	Arlington, TX	D	2013–present	NSH, CBJ, CHI, **FLA**	Bi-racial	
(Canada)	Mathieu Joseph	Chambly, QC	RW	2018–present	TBL, OTT, **STL**	Bi-racial, Haitian	
(Canada)	Pierre-Olivier Joseph	Laval, QC	D	2020–present	PIT, STL, **VAN**	Bi-racial, Haitian	
(United States)	Dakota Joshua	Dearborn, MI	C	2021–present	STL, VAN, **TOR**	Bi-racial	
(Canada)	Derek Joslin	Richmond Hill, ON	D	2008–2013	SJS, CAR, VAN	Bi-racial	
(Canada)	Evander Kane	Vancouver, BC	LW	2009–present	ATL, WPG, BUF, SJS, EDM, **VAN**	Bi-racial	
(Canada)	Keegan Kolesar	Brandon, MB	RW	2019–present	VGK, DET	Bi-racial	
(Sweden)	Oliver Kylington	Stockholm, Sweden	D	2015–present	CGY, COL, ANA	Swedish-Eritrean	
(Canada)	Nathan LaFayette	New Westminster, BC	C	1993–1999	STL, VAN, NYR, LAK		
(Canada)	Georges Laraque	Montreal, QC	RW	1997–2010	EDM, PIT, PHX, MTL	Haitian	
(Sweden)	Andre Lee	Karlstad, Sweden	LW	2024–present	**LAK**	African-American-Swedish	
(Canada)	Darren Lowe	Toronto, ON	RW	1983–1984	PIT	Afro-Canadian	
(Canada)	Mike Marson	Scarborough, ON	LW	1974–1980	WSH, LAK		
(Canada)	Craig Martin	Amherst, NS	RW	1994–1997	WIN, FLA	Afro-Canadian	
(United States)	Greg Mauldin	Holliston, MA	C	2003–2011	CBJ, NYI, COL	African American	
(Canada)	Jamal Mayers	Toronto, ON	RW	1996–2013	STL, TOR, CGY, SJS, CHI	Bi-racial, Barbadian	
(Canada)	Kenndal McArdle	Toronto, ON	LW	2008–2012	FLA, WPG	Trinidadian	
(Canada)	Sandy McCarthy	Toronto, ON	RW	1993–2004	CGY, TBL, PHI, CAR, NYR, BOS	Black-Mi'kmaq	
(United States)	Mike McHugh	Bowdoin, ME	LW	1988–1992	MNS, SJS	Bi-racial	
(Canada)	Tony McKegney	Montreal, QC	LW	1978–1991	BUF, QUE, MNS, NYR, STL, DET, CHI	Bi-racial, Nigerian	
(Canada)	Sean McMorrow	Vancouver, BC	LW	2002–2003	BUF		
(United States)	K'Andre Miller	Saint Paul, MN	D	2020–present	NYR, **CAR**	Bi-racial	
(Canada)	Rumun Ndur	Zaria, Nigeria	D	1996–2000	BUF, NYR, ATL	Nigerian	
(Canada)	Ray Neufeld	St. Boniface, MB	RW	1979–1990	HAR, WIN, BOS		
(Canada)	Darnell Nurse	Hamilton, ON	D	2014–present	**EDM**	Bi-racial, Trinidadian	
(Sweden)	Johnny Oduya	Stockholm, Sweden	D	2006–2018	NJD, ATL, WPG, CHI, DAL, OTT, PHI	Bi-racial, Kenyan	
(United States)	Kyle Okposo	St. Paul, MN	RW	2007–2024	NYI, BUF, FLA	Bi-racial, Nigerian	
(Canada)	Willie O'Ree	Fredericton, NB	W	1957–1961	BOS	Afro-Canadian	
(Canada)	Theo Peckham	Richmond Hill, ON	D	2007–2013	EDM	Bi-racial	
(Canada)	Isaak Phillips	Barrie, ON	D	2021–present	CHI, **WPG***	Vincentian-Finnish	
(Sweden)	Lucas Raymond	Gothenburg, Sweden	LW	2021–present	**DET**	Bi-racial, Swedish-Afro-French	
(Canada)	Ryan Reaves	Winnipeg, MB	RW	2010–present	STL, PIT, VGK, NYR, MIN, TOR, **SJS**	Bi-racial	
(Canada)	Pokey Reddick	Halifax, NS	G	1986–1994	WIN, EDM, FLA		
(Canada)	Bill Riley	Amherst, NS	RW	1974–1980	WSH, WIN	Afro-Canadian	
(Canada)	Nathan Robinson	Scarborough, ON	C	2003–2006	DET, BOS		
(Canada)	Bryce Salvador	Brandon, MB	D	2000–2015	STL, NJD	Afro-Brazilian-Ukrainian	
(Canada)	Bernie Saunders	Montreal, QC	LW	1979–1981	QUE		
(Canada)	Reggie Savage	Montreal, QC	C	1990–1994	WSH, QUE	Jamaican	
(Canada)	Wayne Simmonds	Scarborough, ON	RW	2008–2023	LAK, PHI, NSH, NJD, BUF, TOR		
(Canada)	Devante Smith-Pelly	Scarborough, ON	RW	2011–2019	ANA, MTL, NJD, WSH		
(Canada)	Gemel Smith	Toronto, ON	C	2016–present	DAL, BOS, TBL, DET	Jamaican	
(Canada)	Givani Smith	Toronto, ON	RW	2019–present	DET, FLA, SJS, COL	Jamaican	
(Canada)	Justin Sourdif	Richmond, BC	RW	2023–present	FLA, **WSH**	Bi-racial	
(Canada)	Anthony Stewart	LaSalle, QC	RW	2005–2012	FLA, ATL, CAR	Bi-racial, Jamaican	
(Canada)	Chris Stewart	Toronto, ON	RW	2008–2018	COL, STL, BUF, MIN, ANA, CGY, PHI	Bi-racial, Jamaican	
(United States)	Jayden Struble	Cumberland, RI	D	2023–present	**MTL**	Bi-racial	
(Canada)	Malcolm Subban	Toronto, ON	G	2014–present	BOS, VGK, CHI, BUF, CBJ	Jamaican-Montserratian	
(Canada)	P. K. Subban	Toronto, ON	D	2009–2022	MTL, NSH, NJD	Jamaican-Montserratian	
(United States)	C. J. Suess	Saint Paul, MN	LW	2019–present	WPG, SJS	Bi-racial	
(Canada)	Akil Thomas	Toronto, ON	C	2023–present	LAK, **STL***	Barbadian	
(Canada)	Graeme Townshend	Kingston, Jamaica	RW	1989–1994	BOS, NYI, OTT	Jamaican	
(Canada)	Claude Vilgrain	Port-au-Prince, Haiti	RW	1987–1994	VAN, NJD, PHI	Haitian	
(Canada)	Daniel Walcott	Ile-Perrot, QC	D	2020–2021	TBL	Bi-racial	
(Canada)	Joel Ward	North York, ON	RW	2006–2018	MIN, NSH, WSH, SJS	Barbadian	
(United States)	Marshall Warren	Laurel Hollow, NY	D	2025–present	**NYI**	Bi-racial	
(Canada)	Kevin Weekes	Toronto, ON	G	1997–2009	FLA, VAN, NYI, TBL, CAR, NYR, NJD	Barbadian	
(Canada)	Peter Worrell	Pierrefonds, QC	LW	1997–2004	FLA, COL	Barbadian	

== See also ==
- Black players in ice hockey
- List of African-American sports firsts
- List of starting black NFL quarterbacks
- Race and ethnicity in the NHL
- List of Indian NHL players
