= List of cricket grounds in Canada =

This is a list of cricket grounds in Canada. The grounds included in this list have held first-class, List-A and Twenty20 matches. Additionally, some have also hosted One Day Internationals and Twenty20 Internationals.

== International grounds ==
| Official name (known as) | City or town | Capacity | Ends | Ref |
|---|---|---|---|---|
| Maple Leaf North-West Ground | King City | 7,000 | • Northern End • Southern End | |
| Toronto Cricket, Skating and Curling Club Ground | Toronto | 4,875 | | |

== Other Grounds ==
| Official name (known as) | City or town | Capacity | Ends | Ref |
|---|---|---|---|---|
| Maple Leaf Cricket Grounds | King City | n/a | • Northern End • Southern End | |
| Rosedale | Toronto | | | |
| Sunnybrook Park | Toronto | | | |
