= William Bottomore =

English cricketer

Personal information
- Full name: William Bottomore
- Born: 1845; Shepshed, Leicestershire, England
- Died: 21 October 1905 (aged 60); Shepshed, Leicestershire, England
- Batting: Unknown
- Bowling: Right-arm medium-fast

Career statistics
Competition	First-class
Matches	1
Runs scored	48
Batting average	48.00
100s/50s	–/–
Top score	35*
Catches/stumpings	1/–
- Source: Cricinfo, 10 February 2022

William Bottomore (1845 – 21 October 1905) was an English first-class cricketer.

Bottomore was born in the Leicestershire village of Shepshed in 1845. He played his county cricket for Leicestershire, then a second-class county. He was described as a fast bowler and a good batsman, recording a highest score of 79 against Sussex. Bottomore had travelled to the United States in 1883, where he played one first-class cricket match for the United States cricket team against the Gentlemen of Philadelphia at Philadelphia. Batting twice in the match, he was dismissed for 13 runs in the United States first innings by John B. Thayer. In their second innings he scored 35 unbeaten runs and shared in a match-winning partnership of 26 with Edward Ogden. He returned to England the following year and continued to play minor matches for Leicestershire until 1885. Bottomore died suddenly at Shepshed in October 1905, aged 60.
