= Archibald Gibson =

Canadian cricketer

Personal information
- Full name: Archibald Hope Gibson
- Born: 8 March 1888; Hamilton, Ontario, Canada
- Died: 12 February 1920 (aged 31); Hamilton, Ontario, Canada
- Batting: Unknown

Career statistics
Competition	First-class
Matches	1
Runs scored	21
Batting average	10.50
100s/50s	–/–
Top score	19
Catches/stumpings	–/–
- Source: Cricinfo, 30 January 2022

Archibald Hope Gibson (8 March 1888 – 12 February 1920) was a Canadian first-class cricketer.

Gibson was born at Hamilton in March 1888. A member of the Hamilton Cricket Club and the Toronto Cricket Club, he toured England in 1910 with the Toronto I Zingari. He later made a single appearance in first-class cricket for a combined Canada and United States of America cricket team against the touring Australians at Toronto in 1913. Batting twice in the match, he scored 19 runs in the Canada/United States first innings before being dismissed by Arthur Mailey, while in their second innings he was dismissed for 2 runs by Jack Crawford, with the Australians winning the match by an innings and 147 runs. It was noted by Wisden that "he was an excellent all-round athlete". Gibson died at Hamilton in February 1920.
