= Crosbie Baber =

Canadian cricketer

Personal information
- Full name: Walter Crosbie Baber
- Born: 21 September 1880; British Barbados
- Died: 1959 (aged 78/79)
- Batting: Unknown
- Bowling: Unknown

Career statistics
Competition	First-class
Matches	1
Runs scored	17
Batting average	8.50
100s/50s	–/–
Top score	17
Balls bowled	132
Wickets	3
Bowling average	33.66
5 wickets in innings	–
10 wickets in match	–
Best bowling	3/101
Catches/stumpings	–/–
- Source: Cricinfo, 30 January 2022

Walter Crosbie Baber (21 September 1880 – 1959) was a Barbadian-born Canadian first-class cricketer.

Baber was born at British Barbados in September 1880. He later emigrated to Canada, where he played for several provincial teams. He also played club cricket in the United States and was a member of the Staten Island Cricket Club. He made a single appearance in first-class cricket for a combined Canada and United States of America cricket team against the touring Australians at Rosedale in 1913. He took the wickets of Charlie Macartney, Sid Emery, and Austin Diamond for the cost of 101 runs. Batting twice from the middle order, he scored 17 runs in the Canada/United States first innings before being dismissed by Leslie Cody, while following-on in their second innings he was dismissed by without scoring by Macartney.

He attended McGill University in 1913, before serving in the First World War as a lieutenant in the Canadian Expeditionary Force. Following the war, he returned to McGill to complete his studies. Crosbie was living in New York City in 1937 as a partner in the firm Bayliss, Baber & Co., in evidence given to a tax evasion hearing to the Joint Committee on Tax Evasion and Avoidance before the United States Congress. He died in 1959.
