= Hugh Reid (cricketer) =

Canadian cricketer

Personal information
- Full name: Hugh S. Reid
- Born: 1885; Canada
- Died: Not known
- Batting: Unknown
- Bowling: Unknown

Career statistics
| Competition | First-class |
|---|---|
| Matches | 2 |
| Runs scored | 32 |
| Batting average | 8.00 |
| 100s/50s | –/– |
| Top score | 18 |
| Balls bowled | 12 |
| Wickets | 0 |
| Bowling average | – |
| 5 wickets in innings | – |
| 10 wickets in match | – |
| Best bowling | – |
| Catches/stumpings | 1/– |
- Source: Cricinfo, 30 January 2022

Hugh S. Reid (1885 – date of death not known) was a Canadian first-class cricketer.

Reid was born in Canada in 1885. A member of both the Toronto Cricket Club and the Rosedale Cricket Club, he made two appearances in first-class cricket for a combined Canada and United States of America cricket team against the touring Australians in 1913; one match was played in the United States at Philadelphia and the other in Canada at Toronto. Playing as an opening batsman in three of his four innings', he scored 32 runs with a highest score of 18.
