= Joel Ward (ice hockey) =

Canadian ice hockey player (born 1980)

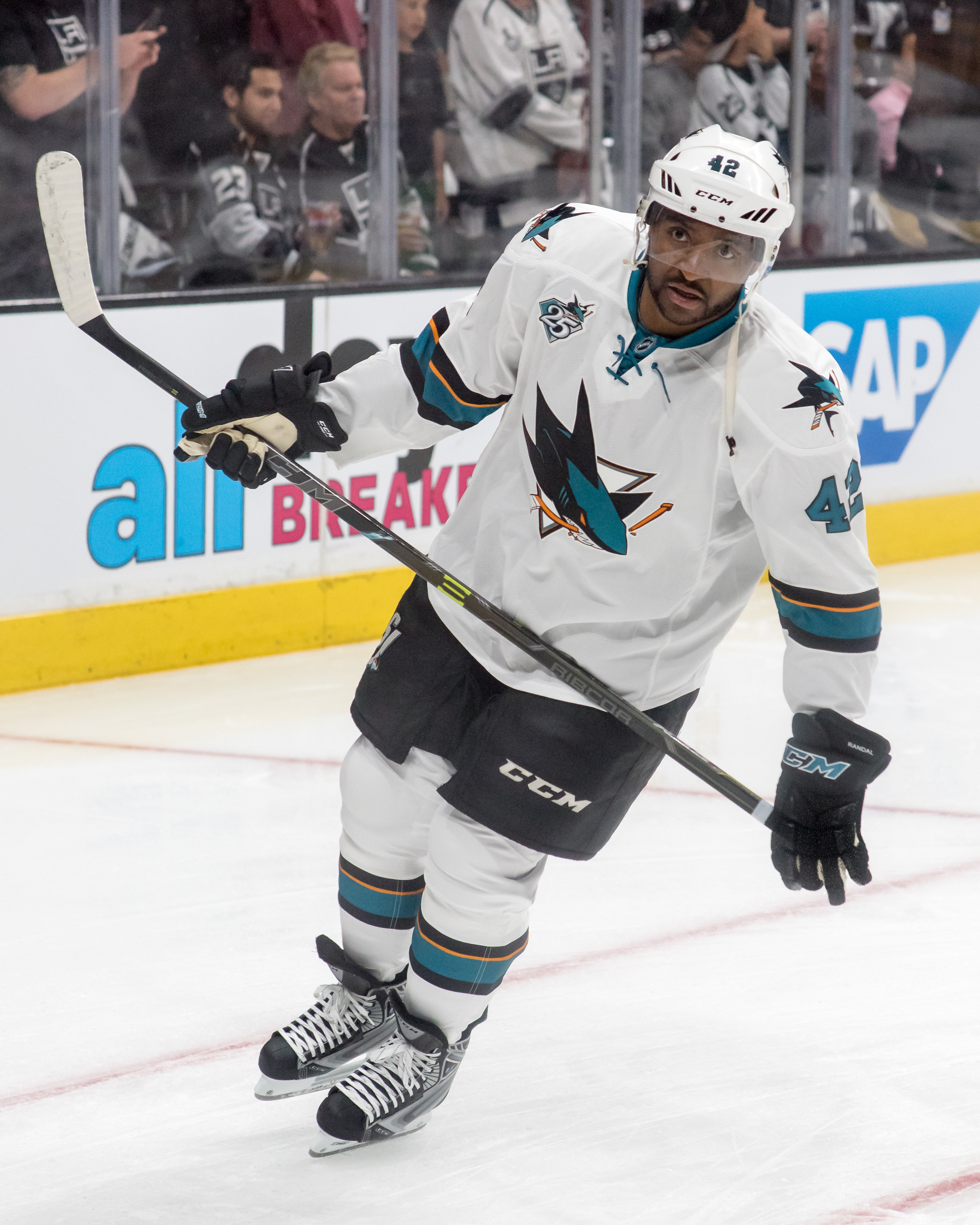
- Ward with the San Jose Sharks in April 2016
- Born: December 2, 1980 (age 45) North York, Ontario, Canada
- Height: 6 ft 1 in (185 cm)
- Weight: 225 lb (102 kg; 16 st 1 lb)
- Position: Right wing
- Played for: Minnesota Wild; Nashville Predators; Washington Capitals; San Jose Sharks
- Current AHL coach: Henderson Silver Knights
- National team: Canada
- NHL draft: Undrafted
- Playing career: 2005–2018
- Coaching career: 2020–present

Joel Randal Ward (born December 2, 1980) is a Canadian professional ice hockey coach and former player who is currently the head coach of the Henderson Silver Knights of the American Hockey League (AHL). Ward previously played in the National Hockey League (NHL) for the Minnesota Wild, Nashville Predators, Washington Capitals and San Jose Sharks.

== Early life ==
Ward was born in North York, Ontario, to Cecilia, who worked as a nurse, and the late Randal Ward, who worked as an automotive mechanic. Both of his parents emigrated to Canada from Barbados. As a youth, Ward played in the 1994 Quebec International Pee-Wee Hockey Tournament with a minor ice hockey team from North York. He also has two older brothers who played hockey in their youth.

Ward graduated from Sir Wilfrid Laurier Collegiate Institute in 1998.

== Playing career ==
=== Amateur ===
Undrafted, Ward played in the Ontario Hockey League (OHL) with the Owen Sound Platers. After completing his four-year junior career and his final year of eligibility with the Platers in 2000–01, Ward linked up with lower tier professional team the Long Beach Ice Dogs of the West Coast Hockey League to end the season. An unsigned free agent to start the 2001–02 season, Ward attended the Detroit Red Wings' training camp on a try-out basis, but was ultimately recruited and played collegiately for the University of Prince Edward Island Panthers of the CIS. He received a Bachelor of Arts in Sociology from UPEI in 2006.

=== Professional ===
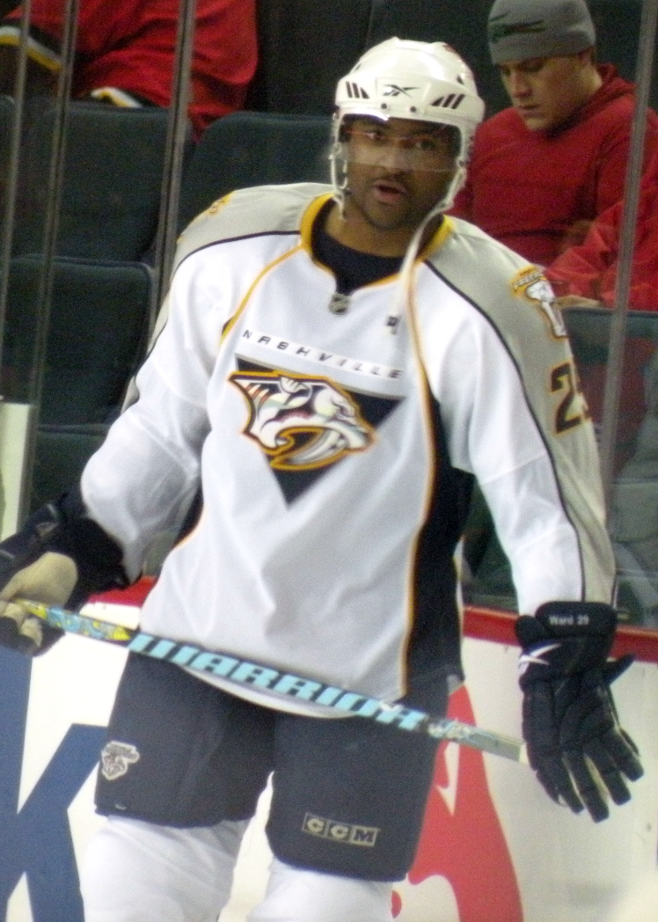
Ward playing for the Predators in December 2009

Awarded Rookie of the Year and the Panthers' three-time MVP while earning a degree in Sociology in his four-year collegiate career, Ward was invited to the Minnesota Wild's training camp in 2006. In his first full professional season, he was assigned to the Wild's American Hockey League (AHL) affiliate, the Houston Aeros, signing his first professional contract for the entirety of the 2005–06 season.

After impressing Wild management with his work ethic, Ward earned a two-year contract with Minnesota on September 27, 2006. He debuted in 11 NHL games with the Wild during the 2006–07 season, but spent his time primarily with the Aeros, developing into a responsible, two-way player and improving his points totals in each of his three years.

As a free agent, Ward signed a one-year contract with the Nashville Predators on July 15, 2008. He made the opening night roster out of training camp for the 2008–09 season and scored his first NHL goal in his first game as a Predator against the St. Louis Blues on October 10, 2008.

In 2008–09, his first full NHL season, he scored 17 goals in 79 games, and his reliability as a defensive forward, and success as a utility scoring forward earned him a two-year contract extension on July 1, 2009.

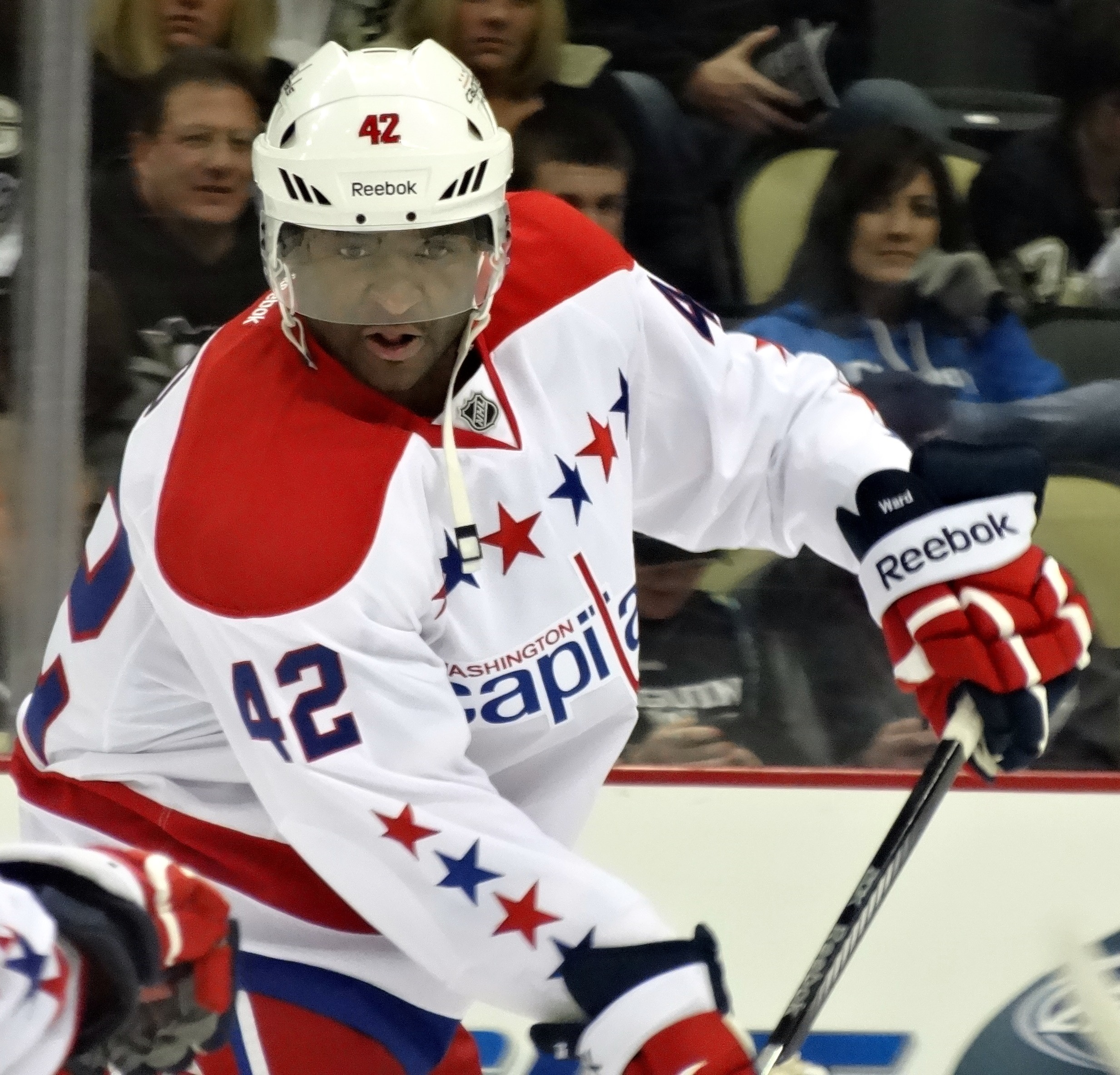
Ward with the Capitals in March 2013

Ward became an unrestricted free agent after the 2010–11 season and subsequently signed a four-year, $12 million contract with the Washington Capitals on July 1, 2011. On April 25, 2012, Ward scored the game-winning goal in overtime in Game 7 of the first round of the 2012 Stanley Cup playoffs against the defending Stanley Cup champions, the Boston Bruins, advancing Washington to the Eastern Conference Semifinals. However, Ward's fortune would not continue into Washington's series with the New York Rangers. With the series tied at two games apiece, Ward took a high-sticking double minor penalty on Carl Hagelin with 22 seconds remaining in the third period of Game 5, with Washington leading 2–1. Rangers forward Brad Richards tied the game with under ten seconds remaining, and defenceman Marc Staal scored in overtime with the Rangers still on the powerplay as a result of Ward's penalty; the Rangers took a 3–2 series lead. After the Capitals' ultimate elimination in the series, Ward required surgery for a sports hernia.

On November 1, 2013, in his 336th career game, Ward scored his first career hat-trick, coming against the Philadelphia Flyers in a 7–0 Washington victory.

In 2014, Ward was selected to represent Canada at the 2014 IIHF World Championship. He started on the team's checking fourth line, but finished as one of the team's top scorers.

On July 3, 2015, as an unrestricted free agent, Ward signed a three-year, $9.75 million contract with the San Jose Sharks.

As the Sharks prepared to play in the 2016 Stanley Cup Finals against the Pittsburgh Penguins, Ward spoke to ESPN, stating that the NHL's first Black player, retired fellow right winger Willie O'Ree, should have his player number 22 retired by the NHL league-wide, just as Jackie Robinson, the first player of colour in Major League Baseball has been honoured—and whom O'Ree had met in person in his own younger years— by having his own player number 42 retired league-wide.

After his contract expired after three seasons, Ward left the Sharks' organization. On September 14, 2018, Ward agreed to attend the Montreal Canadiens' training camp on a professional tryout. However, the Canadiens released Ward from his tryout on September 25.

On April 27, 2020, Ward announced his retirement from professional ice hockey via The Players' Tribune.

On June 8, 2020, Ward became an inaugural executive board member of the Hockey Diversity Alliance, whose goal is to address intolerance and racism in hockey.

== Coaching career ==
Ward took his first coaching position on November 23, 2020, as he was hired as an assistant coach for the newly-relocated Henderson Silver Knights of the American Hockey League. On July 12, 2023, Ward was promoted to assistant coach of the Vegas Golden Knights, Henderson's NHL parent club. On June 25, 2026, Ward was named head coach of Henderson, succeeding Ryan Craig after the latter was named Vegas' head coach.

== Career statistics ==
=== Regular season and playoffs ===
			Regular season					Playoffs
Season	Team	League	GP	G	A	Pts	PIM	GP	G	A	Pts	PIM
1997–98	Owen Sound Platers	OHL	47	8	4	12	14	11	1	1	2	5
1998–99	Owen Sound Platers	OHL	58	19	16	35	23	16	2	4	6	0
1999–00	Owen Sound Platers	OHL	63	23	20	43	51	—	—	—	—	—
2000–01	Owen Sound Attack	OHL	67	26	36	62	45	5	2	4	6	4
2000–01	Long Beach Ice Dogs	WCHL	—	—	—	—	—	8	0	0	0	0
2001–02	U. of Prince Edward Island	CIS	22	13	14	27	16	—	—	—	—	—
2002–03	U. of Prince Edward Island	CIS	19	11	15	26	24	—	—	—	—	—
2003–04	U. of Prince Edward Island	CIS	27	14	24	38	42	—	—	—	—	—
2004–05	U. of Prince Edward Island	CIS	28	16	28	44	42	—	—	—	—	—
2005–06	Houston Aeros	AHL	66	8	14	22	34	8	4	2	6	4
2006–07	Houston Aeros	AHL	64	9	14	23	45	—	—	—	—	—
2006–07	Minnesota Wild	NHL	11	0	1	1	0	—	—	—	—	—
2007–08	Houston Aeros	AHL	79	21	20	41	47	4	0	2	2	0
2008–09	Nashville Predators	NHL	79	17	18	35	29	—	—	—	—	—
2009–10	Nashville Predators	NHL	71	13	21	34	18	6	2	2	4	2
2010–11	Nashville Predators	NHL	80	10	19	29	42	12	7	6	13	6
2011–12	Washington Capitals	NHL	73	6	12	18	20	14	1	4	5	6
2012–13	Washington Capitals	NHL	39	8	12	20	12	7	1	3	4	6
2013–14	Washington Capitals	NHL	82	24	25	49	32	—	—	—	—	—
2014–15	Washington Capitals	NHL	82	19	15	34	30	14	3	6	9	2
2015–16	San Jose Sharks	NHL	79	21	22	43	28	24	7	6	13	16
2016–17	San Jose Sharks	NHL	78	10	19	29	30	6	1	3	4	4
2017–18	San Jose Sharks	NHL	52	5	7	12	20	—	—	—	—	—
NHL totals			726	133	171	304	261	83	22	30	52	42

=== International ===
Year	Team	Event	Result	GP	G	A	Pts	PIM
2014	Canada	WC	5th	8	6	3	9	4
Senior totals				8	6	3	9	4

== See also ==
- Barbadian Canadian
- List of black NHL players

Sporting positions
Preceded by Ryan Craig	Head coach of the Henderson Silver Knights; 2026–present	Incumbent
