= Stuart Saunders (Canadian cricketer) =

Canadian cricketer

Personal information
- Full name: Stuart R. Saunders
- Born: 1880; Canada
- Died: 6 January 1950 (aged 69–70); Toronto, Ontario, Canada
- Batting: Unknown

Career statistics
Competition	First-class
Matches	1
Runs scored	19
Batting average	19.00
100s/50s	–/–
Top score	10
Catches/stumpings	–/–
- Source: Cricinfo, 30 January 2022

Stuart R. Saunders (1880 – 6 January 1950) was a Canadian first-class cricketer.

Saunders was born in Canada in 1880. He studied at McGill University and was a member of the Toronto Cricket Club. He made a single appearance in first-class cricket, captaining a combined Canada and United States of America cricket team against the touring Australians at Toronto in 1913. Batting twice in the match, he was dismissed for 10 runs by Arthur Mailey in the Canada/United States first innings, while following-on in their second innings he was unbeaten on 9, with the Australians winning the match by an innings and 147 runs. It was noted by Wisden that "he did much to help the game in Canada" and that he toured England with Canadian sides. Saunders died at Toronto in January 1950.
