= Allan Percival =

Canadian cricketer

Personal information
- Full name: Alan Percival
- Born: 1923; Canada
- Died: c. 1985; Toronto, Ontario, Canada
- Batting: Right-handed
- Role: Wicket-keeper

Domestic team information
- Years: Team
- 1951–1954: Canada

Career statistics
Competition	First-class
Matches	5
Runs scored	61
Batting average	8.71
100s/50s	–/–
Top score	23
Balls bowled	–
Wickets	–
Bowling average	–
5 wickets in innings	–
10 wickets in match	–
Best bowling	–
Catches/stumpings	9/1
- Source: Cricinfo, 27 February 2011

W. Allan Percival (1923 – c. 1985) was a Canadian cricketer. He was a right-handed batsman who fielded as a wicket-keeper. As with his exact date of birth being unknown, it is also unknown where in Canada he was born.

Percival made his first-class debut for Canada in 1951 at the Toronto Cricket, Skating and Curling Club against the touring Marylebone Cricket Club. Later, in 1954 he played four first-class matches against English county opponents during Canada's tour of England. This included his final first-class appearance, which came against Yorkshire at North Marine Road Ground, Scarborough during Canada's 1954 tour of England. In his five career first-class matches, he scored 61 runs at a batting average of 8.71, with a high score of 23. Behind the stumps he took 9 catches and made a single stumping. In Canada, he played numerous non-notable matches, including ones for Ontario between 1948 and 1952.

He died in Toronto, Ontario c. 1985.
