= Cuthbert Godwin =

English cricketer

Personal information
- Full name: Cuthbert Blair Godwin
- Born: 16 October 1891; Frenchay, Bristol, England
- Died: 23 October 1969 (aged 78); Clifton, Bristol, England
- Batting: Right-handed
- Bowling: Right-arm slow

Domestic team information
- Years: Team
- 1926: Somerset

Career statistics
Competition	FC
Matches	2
Runs scored	8
Batting average	2.00
100s/50s	0/0
Top score	5
Balls bowled	174
Wickets	1
Bowling average	72.00
5 wickets in innings	0
10 wickets in match	0
Best bowling	1/66
Catches/stumpings	1/–
- Source: CricketArchive, 22 December 2015

Cuthbert Blair Godwin (16 October 1891 – 23 October 1969) played first-class cricket for Somerset in two matches in the 1926 season. He was born at Frenchay, Bristol and died at Clifton, Bristol.

Godwin was a right-handed lower-order batsman and a right-arm slow bowler. Somerset lost both matches he played in by an innings. He made only eight runs in four innings and his only wicket came in his first game when he caught and bowled Frank Watson of Lancashire. In his second and final match, against Glamorgan he was the third victim in a hat-trick by Trevor Arnott, the first hat-trick by a Glamorgan player in first-class cricket.
