= Robert Quintrell =

Australian-born Canadian cricketer

Personal information
- Full name: Robert N Quintrell
- Born: 1931; Australia
- Died: 1983 (aged 51/52); Vancouver, British Columbia, Canada
- Batting: Right-handed
- Bowling: Right-arm medium

Domestic team information
- Years: Team
- 1954: Canada

Career statistics
Competition	First-class
Matches	4
Runs scored	76
Batting average	12.66
100s/50s	–/–
Top score	29
Balls bowled	54
Wickets	–
Bowling average	–
5 wickets in innings	–
10 wickets in match	–
Best bowling	–
Catches/stumpings	2/–
- Source: CricketArchive, 14 October 2011

Robert N Quintrell (1931 in Australia – 1983 in Vancouver, Canada) was a Canadian cricketer. He was a right-handed batsman and a right-arm medium pace bowler. He played for the Canadian cricket team on their 1954 tour of England, including all four first-class matches, in which he made a top score of 29 against Yorkshire.
