= Edward Ogden =

Canadian-American cricketer and medical doctor

Personal information
- Full name: Edward Russell Ogden
- Born: 17 June 1862; Oakville, Canada West
- Died: 15 May 1913 (aged 50); Chicago, Illinois, United States
- Batting: Left-handed
- Bowling: Right-arm medium

Career statistics
| Competition | First-class |
|---|---|
| Matches | 1 |
| Runs scored | 65 |
| Batting average | 65.00 |
| 100s/50s | –/– |
| Top score | 49 |
| Balls bowled | 32 |
| Wickets | 0 |
| Bowling average | – |
| 5 wickets in innings | – |
| 10 wickets in match | – |
| Best bowling | – |
| Catches/stumpings | –/– |
- Source: Cricinfo, 30 January 2022

Edward Russell Ogden (17 June 1862 – 15 May 1913) was a Canadian-born American first-class cricketer and medical doctor.

The son of Dr. Edwy J. Ogden, he was born in June 1862 at Oakville, Canada West. He was educated at the Upper Canada College, where he played for the college cricket team, before following in his father's footsteps by becoming a medical doctor.

He was initially a member of the Toronto Cricket Club, in addition to playing minor matches for Canada against the United States in 1881, 1883 and 1884. From Toronto he relocated his medical practice to Chicago in the United States; there he played for the Chicago Cricket Club, which had been founded by his father in 1876. Considered the best all-rounder in North America at the time, Ogden made a single appearance in first-class cricket for the United States against the Gentlemen of Philadelphia at Philadelphia in 1883. Batting twice in the match, he was dismissed in the United States first innings by Walter Clark for 49 runs, while in their second innings he shared in a match-winning partnership of 26 with William Bottomore in which Ogden contributed 16 runs. With his right-arm medium pace bowling, he bowled eight wicketless overs in the Philadelphia first innings. He returned to play for Canada as captain on their 1887 tour of England, scoring 701 runs and taking 91 wickets. Wisden noted that he "was clearly the best all-round player in the side". Ogden died at Chicago in May 1913.
