= Robert Wilson (cricketer, born 1934) =

English cricketer

Personal information
- Full name: Robert Warley Wilson
- Born: 15 July 1934 (age 92); Warley, Worcestershire, England
- Batting: Right-handed
- Bowling: Right-arm off-spin

Domestic team information
- Years: Team
- 1956–1957: Oxford University

Career statistics
Competition	First-class
Matches	13
Runs scored	169
Batting average	9.38
100s/50s	0/0
Top score	36*
Balls bowled	2700
Wickets	34
Bowling average	37.20
5 wickets in innings	0
10 wickets in match	0
Best bowling	4/42
Catches/stumpings	10/–
- Source: Cricinfo, 10 July 2019

Robert Warley Wilson (born 15 July 1934) is a former first-class cricketer who played for Oxford University in 1956 and 1957. He later lived in Canada.

== Education ==
Wilson was born in Warley, Worcestershire, and educated at Warwick School before going up to Brasenose College, Oxford.

== Career ==
An off-spin bowler, Wilson played one match for Oxford University in 1956 and a full season in 1957. His best first-class figures were 4 for 42 against D. R. Jardine's XI in 1957. He also played Rugby union for Oxford University, and was a Double Blue in cricket and rugby.

After graduating from Oxford, Wilson went to Canada, where he played several matches of non-first-class cricket for the national team between 1959 and 1968.
