= Nesbit Wallace =

Personal information
- Full name: Nesbit Willoughby Wallace
- Born: 20 April 1839; Halifax, Nova Scotia, British North America
- Died: 31 July 1931 (aged 92); Guildford, Surrey, England
- Batting: Right-handed
- Bowling: Right-arm underarm slow

Domestic team information
- Years: Team
- 1871: Gloucestershire
- 1884: Hampshire
- 1885: Marylebone Cricket Club

Career statistics
Competition	First-class
Matches	6
Runs scored	66
Batting average	8.25
100s/50s	–/–
Top score	24
Balls bowled	16
Wickets	0
Bowling average	–
5 wickets in innings	–
10 wickets in match	–
Best bowling	–
Catches/stumpings	4/–
- Source: Cricinfo, 24 December 2009

Nesbit Willoughby Wallace CMG JP (20 April 1839 − 31 July 1931) was a Canadian first-class cricketer and an officer in the British Army.

== Military career and cricket ==
The son of Charles Hill Wallace, he was born in April 1839 at Halifax, Nova Scotia. Wallace was educated in England at Rugby School, where he was coached by James Lillywhite. From there, he was commissioned as an ensign into the Northamptonshire Militia in November 1857. He transferred to the 76th Regiment of Foot in March 1858, prior to his promotion to lieutenant by purchase in the 60th Foot in January 1861. Wallace made his debut in first-class cricket in 1863, when he was selected to play for the Gentlemen of the South against Surrey at The Oval; prior to that, he had played minor matches for Hampshire in 1859. In January 1869, he purchased the rank of captain in the 60th Foot.

Wallace served in Canada in 1870, taking part in the Wolseley expedition. He returned to England in 1871, having been dispatched to Bristol by the Canadian lawyer and newspaper editor Thomas Patteson to recruit W. G. Grace for an English tour of North America. Wallace was so well received at Bristol that he played two first-class matches for Gloucestershire against Surrey and Nottinghamshire in 1871. He wrote a history of the 60th Foot, which he published and presented to Queen Victoria in 1879. He was promoted to major in June 1880, prior to retiring from active service and being placed on half-pay in January 1883; he was subsequently placed on retired pay in January 1886, with the honorary rank of lieutenant colonel. Thirteen years after his previous first-class appearance, Wallace made two appearances for Hampshire against Surrey and Kent in 1884. The following year, he played one match for the Marylebone Cricket Club against Hampshire at Southampton. In six first-class matches, he scored 66 runs at an average of 8.25 and a highest score of 25. In addition to playing at first-class level, Wallace also played for the British Army cricket team, was a member of the United Services club, and was secretary of the Green Jackets Club, a club for former members of the 60th Foot and the Rifle Brigade. By 1896, he was a vice-president of Hampshire County Cricket Club.

Towards the end of the Second Boer War, a regiment was formed as part of the Imperial Yeomanry in November 1901, known as the 4th County of London Imperial Yeomanry (King's Colonials), with the Prince of Wales (later King George V) as honorary colonel and Wallace coming out of retirement to act as its first commanding officer. It was composed of four squadrons of colonial volunteers resident in London – one of Asians (British Asian Squadron), one of Canadians (British American Squadron), one of Australasians (Australasian Squadron), and one of South Africans and Rhodesians (British African Squadron). A New Zealand squadron was later formed, with the Australasian squadron being redesignated as Australian. As the war drew towards a close, the regiment never saw action in South Africa. Wallace was granted the honorary rank of colonel on 2 December 1902, and was later made a Companion to the Order of St Michael and St George. In later life, he was a justice of the peace for Hampshire. Wallace died at Guildford in July 1931, at the age of 92.
