= Walter Price (Worcestershire cricketer) =

English cricketer

Cricket information
- Batting: Left-handed
- Bowling: Left-arm medium

Career statistics
| Competition | First-class |
|---|---|
| Matches | 3 |
| Runs scored | 12 |
| Batting average | 4.00 |
| 100s/50s | 0/0 |
| Top score | 7 |
| Balls bowled | 420 |
| Wickets | 8 |
| Bowling average | 35.50 |
| 5 wickets in innings | 0 |
| 10 wickets in match | 0 |
| Best bowling | 4/86 |
| Catches/stumpings | 1/0 |
- Source: CricketArchive, 10 October 2022

Walter Longsdon Price (2 February 1886 – 26 December 1943) was an English first-class cricketer who played three games for Worcestershire in July 1904. His best bowling return of 4/86 came in his second game, against Surrey at Worcester.

Price was born in Toxteth Park, Liverpool; he died at age 57 at Warren Cross Farm, Lechlade, Gloucestershire.
