= Ziaullah =

Pakistani cricketer (born 1936)

Personal information
- Full name: Ziaullah Khan
- Born: 12 December 1936 (age 89); Amritsar, India
- Batting: Left-handed
- Bowling: Slow left-arm orthodox

Domestic team information
- Years: Team
- 1956-57 to 1963-64: Karachi
- 1964-65 to 1969-70: Lahore

Career statistics
Competition	First-class
Matches	37
Runs scored	1316
Batting average	24.37
100s/50s	0/9
Top score	81
Balls bowled	6460
Wickets	125
Bowling average	18.71
5 wickets in innings	6
10 wickets in match	0
Best bowling	5/14
Catches/stumpings	9/–
- Source: Cricinfo, 27 December 2016

Ziaullah Khan (born 12 December 1936) is a former Pakistani cricketer who played first-class cricket from 1955 to 1969.

Ziaullah was a left-handed batsman and slow left-arm orthodox spinner. His best season with the ball was 1962–63, when he took 30 wickets at an average of 15.23, and took five wickets in an innings four times. His best figures came in that season, when in a semi-final of the Quaid-e-Azam Trophy he took 5 for 14 and 4 for 53, as well as making 56 (the top score of the match) and 25, for Karachi B against Rawalpindi.
