= Granville Down =

Australian cricketer

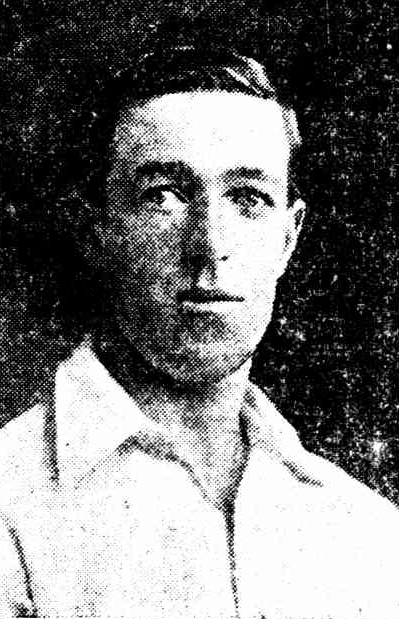

Personal information
- Full name: Granville James Stuart Down
- Born: 24 May 1883; Bathurst, New South Wales, Australia
- Died: 14 May 1970 (aged 86); Melbourne, Australia
- Batting: Right-handed
- Role: Batsman

Domestic team information
- Years: Team
- South Australia

Career statistics
Competition	First-class
Matches	7
Runs scored	156
Batting average	15.60
100s/50s	0/0
Top score	47
Balls bowled	12
Wickets	0
Bowling average	–
5 wickets in innings	–
10 wickets in match	–
Best bowling	–
Catches/stumpings	1/–
- Source: Cricinfo, 31 October 2018

Granville James Stuart Down MC (24 May 1883 – 14 May 1970) was an Australian cricketer and soldier.

Down played four first-class matches for South Australia in the 1911–12 season, and three for the Australian team on the tour of North America in 1913. He was a last-minute replacement in the tour side for Victor Trumper, who had to withdraw for business reasons. He was an all-rounder for the Adelaide Club in district cricket. His highest first-class score was 47 for the Australians against Gentlemen of Philadelphia in June 1913.

Down enlisted in the Australian Army in January 1915 and served on Gallipoli with the 3rd Australian Light Horse Regiment. He was transferred to the 2nd Division Headquarters as Major Leane's personal clerk. He saw service attached to the Deputy Assistant Director of Ordnance Services, was commissioned in July 1916, and after promotion to captain was awarded the Military Cross in September 1917. He was promoted to major in July 1918.

Down married Dorothy Heath in Sydney in July 1920. She divorced him in Melbourne in July 1936 on the grounds of desertion.
