= Percival Arnott =

Australian cricketer

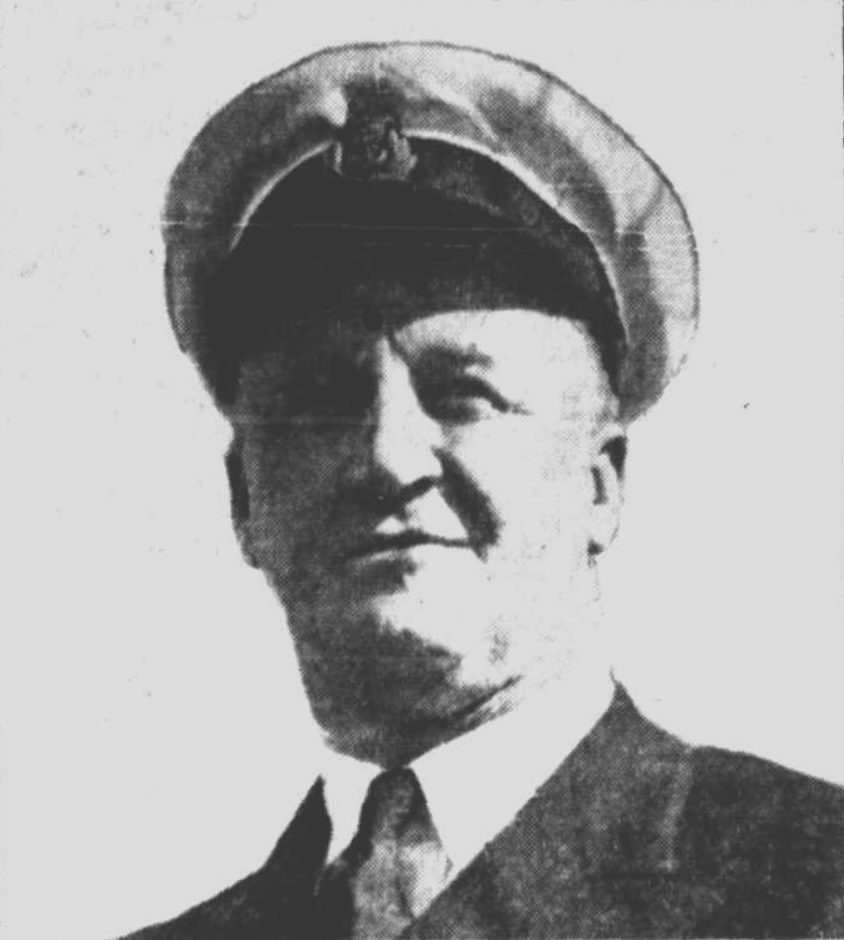

Personal information
- Born: 9 July 1889; Newcastle, New South Wales, Australia
- Died: 23 December 1950 (aged 61); Strathfield, New South Wales, Australia
- Source: ESPNcricinfo, 22 December 2016

Percival Arnott (9 July 1889 – 23 December 1950) was an Australian cricketer. He played ten first-class matches for New South Wales between 1911/12 and 1912/13.

Percy Arnott was a director of Arnott's Biscuits. He died in December 1950, survived by his wife and their four married daughters.

== See also ==
- List of New South Wales representative cricketers
