= Jerrold Kessel =

Israeli journalist, sports journalist, author and foreign correspondent

Jerrold (Yoram) Kessel (Hebrew: ג'רולד קסל; March 3, 1944 – February 24, 2011) was an Israeli journalist, sports journalist, author, and foreign correspondent.

== Biography ==
Kessel immigrated to Israel from South Africa at an early age. He helped introduce cricket to Israel, playing for the Israel national cricket team in the ICC Trophy from 1979 to 1990. He played cricket for Team Israel at the 1973 Maccabiah Games.

He was married to Lorraine and had a son, Ariel, and four grandchildren. He died from cancer at the age of 66. His funeral was held at Givat HaShlosha in central Israel.

== Media career ==
Kessel was a news editor for the Jerusalem Post, reported on the Middle East for CNN from its Jerusalem bureau from 1990 to 2003. He was known for his iconic white beard. He had been called "one of Israel's leading English-language journalists." He initially worked for Israel Radio, the Jerusalem correspondent for the London Jewish Chronicle, and the Jerusalem Post before joining CNN as an on-air correspondent in 1990.

He covered major events affecting Israel for CNN, including the Oslo Accords and the assassination of former Israeli Prime Minister Yitzhak Rabin. Kessel began producing and co-producing independent television programming after leaving CNN in 2003.

He also authored a book of soccer and began writing a sports column for the daily newspaper, Haaretz, the last of which was published a week before his death in 2011.

== See also ==
- Israeli journalism
- Sports in Israel
