= Odimumba Kwamdela =

Barbadian author (1942-2019)

- Born: 11 September 1942; Penny Hole Saint Philip, Barbados
- Died: 16 January 2019 (aged 76); New York, New York, US
- Occupations: Publisher; writer; author
- Writing career
- Period: 1969–2019
- Notable works: N*ggers this is Canada; Black British Soldier; Mighty Sparrow: Calypso King of the World
- Website: kibobooks.com/kwamdela

Odimumba Kwamdela, born J. Ashton Brathwaite (11 September 1942 – 16 January 2019), was a Barbadian-born writer who published 14 books of fiction, non-fiction, and poetry, and three musically dubbed spoken word albums.

== Background ==
In 1960, while in his early teens, he left his native Barbados for London, England. He eventually enlisted in the British Army and served in the Middle East. After military service, he left London for Ontario, Canada. There he freelanced with Toronto newspapers before becoming founding publisher and editor of Spear Magazine, reputed to be the first Black magazine published in Canada. He once said, "I had big dreams of making Spear the Ebony of Canada."

Eventually becoming disappointed with what he saw as the limitation of Spear in a nation with too small a Black population and believing the "controversial" label given to the original edition of his book, Niggers...This is Canada, made him the object of governmental harassment, he exiled himself to New York City. There, during the Black Arts Movement of the mid-1970s, he made adopted the name Odimumba Kwamdela in place of his birth name.

Kwamdela taught in for the New York City Board of Education as a high-school teacher of Writing and Graphic Arts, serving for several years in the roughest schools in the world, one for adolescent offenders located in infamous, volatile Rikers Island Jail. He wrote a book detailing these experiences.

Kwamdela graduated with a bachelor's degree in creative writing from the City University of New York and a master's degree in instructional technology from New York Institute of Technology.

== Selected works ==
- Black British Soldier (1969)
- Soul in the Wilderness (1970)
- Bitter Soul (1970)
- The Grassroots Philosopher (1970)
- N*ggers...This is Canada (1971)
- The Righteous Blackman (1972)
- Raining Ruins and Rockstones (1981)
- Blood-Boiling Black Blues (1983)
- Back to Penny Hole Forever (1997)
- Mighty Sparrow, Calypso King of the World (2006)
- Deception + Resentment + Racial Hatred + Anti-poor = POLITICS (PARTICULARLY In AMERICA) (2018)
