= Anura Tennekoon =

Sri Lankan cricketer

Personal information
- Full name: Anura Punchi Banda Tennekoon
- Born: 29 October 1946 (age 80); Anuradhapura, Sri Lanka
- Batting: Right-handed
- Bowling: Slow left-arm orthodox
- Role: Batsman

International information
- National side: Sri Lanka (1975–1979)
- ODI debut (cap 9): 7 June 1975 v West Indies
- Last ODI: 9 June 1979 v New Zealand

Career statistics
Competition	ODI	FC	LA
Matches	4	61	19
Runs scored	137	3481	335
Batting average	34.25	36.26	18.61
100s/50s	0/1	5/19	0/2
Top score	59	169*	61
Balls bowled	–	86	–
Wickets	–	2	–
Bowling average	–	30.00	–
5 wickets in innings	–	0	–
10 wickets in match	–	0	–
Best bowling	–	2/23	–
Catches/stumpings	3/0	60/0	7/0
- Source: Cricinfo, 2 April 2010

Anura Tennekoon also spelt as Anura Tennakoon (born 29 October 1946) is a former Sri Lankan cricketer and captain of the Sri Lanka national cricket team. He was educated at the S. Thomas' College in Mount Lavinia.

After captaining the school team and being selected as best schoolboy batsman of the year, Tennekoon went on to play first-class cricket for the Ceylon team (later Sri Lanka). He was regarded as an accomplished batsman. He made his ODI debut in 1975 against West Indies, leading Sri Lanka in the first Cricket World Cup of 1975. went on to lead them in the 1979 World Cup as well, although his participation was impeded by an injury during the tournament.

He was the chief executive of Sri Lanka Cricket from 2000 to 2003, and is now a selector for the national team. In September 2018, he was one of 49 former Sri Lankan cricketers felicitated by Sri Lanka Cricket, to honour them for their services before Sri Lanka became a full member of the International Cricket Council (ICC).

== Biography ==
Anura Punchi Banda Tennekoon was born in Anuradhapura to a Family from Nikaweratiya. At the age of six, he moved to Colombo, and was admitted to S. Thomas' College, Mount Lavinia. Staying at the school hostel, Tennekoon was soon accustomed with cricket, and became part of the school cricket team. He eventually went on to captain the Thomian cricket team, and was chosen as Sri Lanka's best schoolboy batsman in 1964. He had had the best batting average of 56.84 in the previous season, having scored a total of 513 runs.

== Personal life ==
He married Nelun Ramanayake, an Attorney at Law on 6 June 1974 and his marriage took a place just a year before he took the captainship to lead Sri Lanka at international level and subsequently led Sri Lanka at their first Cricket World Cup tournament.

Both Anura and Nelun celebrated their 50th wedding anniversary on 6 June 2024 with a religious service attended by his family members in a special ceremony to mark the occasion.

== Early career ==
He played his first first-class match for Ceylon against an English side in 1966, and was later picked up by the Sinhalese Sports Club (SSC). Tennekoon also played for the Ceylon Board President's XI in Gopalan Trophy matches. He was selected to tour England with the Ceylon team in 1968, but the tour was cancelled just before it was due to begin.

He made his career's highest score in a first class match against India in 1974, hitting an unbeaten 169. This is regarded as one of the best centuries scored by a Sri Lankan batsman before the country gained Test status.

== International career ==
Tennekoon was the ninth ODI cap for Sri Lanka, and played four One Day International (ODI) matches, leading the Sri Lankan side in all of them. Tennekoon captained the Sri Lankan cricket team at the inaugural Cricket World Cup of 1975, during which he played his first three ODIs. The first match was played against the West Indies on 7 June 1975, ended in defeat for Sri Lanka who managed to score only 86 runs. Tennekoon too was unsuccessful in this match, having been caught by David Murray off the bowling of Bernard Julien without scoring. The Sri Lankan team played their second match of the tournament against Australia on 11 June 1975. They lost the match, but Tennekoon was more successful this time – he scored 48 runs off 71 deliveries, before being bowled out by Ian Chappell just two runs short of his half century. According to the Wisden Cricketers' Almanack, Tennekoon and teammate Michael Tissera batted without being intimidated by the Australian fast bowling attack despite two of their teammates having to retire after being injured. Sri Lanka's third and last match in the tournament was against Pakistan on 14 June 1975. Tennekoon made 30 runs for his team, but Pakistan easily defeated Sri Lanka.

Tennekoon's fourth and final ODI was against New Zealand on 9 June 1979, as part of the 1979 Cricket World Cup. He made the highest score and only half-century of his ODI career during this match, making 59 runs off 96 deliveries before being bowled out by Warren Stott. Later, he damaged a hamstring during practices and could not play for the rest of the tournament. He was replaced as captain by Bandula Warnapura. Sri Lanka received full member status of the International Cricket Council in 1982, two years after Tennekoon's retirement. The achievements of Sri Lankan players like Tennekoon may have contributed to this.

== Cricket administration ==
After his retirement from the game, Tennekoon has functioned as the manager of the Sri Lanka A cricket team. He was appointed chief executive officer of Sri Lanka Cricket, the governing body for cricket in Sri Lanka, in December 2000. He held the position until late 2003, when he resigned for personal reasons. In 2009, Tennekoon was appointed to the selection committee for the national cricket team.

== Autobiography ==
In March 2020, he unveiled his autobiography titled Passionately Cricket which he indicated as a tribute to his wife Nelun Ramanayake and also dedicated the book to her. He revealed that his wife had typed out the transcripts for the autobiography and he highlighted that the autobiography contains the life trajectory of how his journey as a cricketer began from schooling days. He launched his autobiography on a special occasion at the Sinhalese Sports Club. He also handed over the first copy of his book to his former captain Michael Tissera.

== See also ==
- List of St. Thomas' College alumni
