= Francis Morice =

New Zealand cricketer

Personal information
- Full name: Francis Henry Morice
- Born: 1851; La Colle, Canada East
- Died: 19 June 1912 (aged 60–61); Dunedin, Otago, New Zealand

Domestic team information
- Years: Team
- 1886/87–1889/90: Wellington

Career statistics
Competition	First-class
Matches	4
Runs scored	18
Batting average	3.00
100s/50s	0/0
Top score	10
Catches/stumpings	1/–
- Source: CricketArchive, 14 October 2011

Francis Henry Morice (1851 – 19 June 1912) was a New Zealand cricketer. He played four first-class matches for Wellington.

Born in Canada, Morice was educated in England and Germany before moving to New Zealand in 1867. He worked from 1872 to 1892 as a police officer. At his sudden death of heart failure he was carrying out his duties as district agent for the Public Trustee and Official Assignee in Dunedin. He left a widow and several children.
