= Anil Lashkari =

Indian-born American cricketer

Personal information
- Full name: Anil H. Lashkari
- Born: August 29, 1934; Ahmedabad, India
- Died: November 1, 2007 (aged 73); Ferndale, Washington, U.S.
- Batting: Left-handed
- Bowling: Right-arm off-spin

International information
- National side: United States (1963–1979)

Domestic team information
- Years: Team
- 1951–1956: Gujarat (India)
- 1952: West Zone (India)
- Source: CricketArchive, 6 September 2016

Anil H. Lashkari (August 29, 1934 – November 1, 2007) was an international cricketer who represented the U.S. national team between 1963 and 1979. He was born in India, and played first-class cricket for Gujarat and West Zone before emigrating to the United States. At the age of 44, he captained the U.S. at the 1979 ICC Trophy, playing alongside his son.

== Career in India ==
Lashkari was born into a prominent textile family in Ahmedabad, India. He made his first-class debut for Gujarat at the age of 17, playing against Maharashtra in the 1951–52 Ranji Trophy. He played another three Ranji Trophy matches the following season, scoring half-centuries against Baroda and Maharashtra, and was also selected to play for West Zone against the touring Pakistanis. During the 1953–54 season, Lashkari was twice selected for an All-India team against the touring Commonwealth XI side, with both teams including several Test players in their line-ups. In the first of those matches, he finished as the Indian XI's leading run-scorer for the match and made a first-class career-high 55 runs in the second innings, batting alongside Madhav Apte, Datta Gaekwad, Syed Mushtaq Ali, Vijay Manjrekar, and Gulabrai Ramchand. Lashkari's first-class career ended at the age of 21, after the 1955–56 season.

== Career in the United States ==
Lashkari studied chemical engineering at the University of Leeds in Yorkshire, England, before eventually relocating to the United States. He settled in Southern California and played club cricket for the Pasadena Cricket Club. Lashkari made his international debut for the U.S. national team in September 1963, in an Auty Cup fixture against Canada in Toronto. In 1968, he was selected for an American tour of England, during which the U.S. played mostly against minor counties. After that tour, his matches for the United States mainly came against Canada, with the exception of a 1973 match against Ireland. At the age of 44, Lashkari was appointed captain of the U.S. for the 1979 ICC Trophy in England, the inaugural edition of what is now the World Cup Qualifier. In the three matches where play was possible (the match against the Netherlands being washed out), he scored three runs against Israel, 16 against Sri Lanka, and 73 against Wales. Lashkari's son, Neil Lashkari, played alongside his father at the 1979 ICC Trophy and appeared in another three editions of the tournament.
