= Mel Rilstone =

Personal information
- Full name: Thomas Melville Rilstone
- Born: 12 January 1918; Wallaroo Mines, South Australia
- Died: 3 March 2009 (aged 91); Welland, Ontario, Canada
- Batting: Left-handed
- Bowling: Leg spin
- Role: Batsman

International information
- National side: Canada

Career statistics
Competition	First-class
Matches	3
Runs scored	54
Batting average	18.00
100s/50s	0/0
Top score	38
Balls bowled	184
Wickets	0
Bowling average	–
5 wickets in innings	–
10 wickets in match	–
Best bowling	–
Catches/stumpings	0/–
- Source: CricketArchive, 25 March 2009

Thomas Melville Rilstone (12 January 1918 – 3 March 2009) was an Australian born Canadian cricketer. A left-handed batsman and leg spin bowler, he played for the Canada national cricket team in the 1950s.

== Biography ==
Born in South Australia in 1918, Mel Rilstone emigrated to Canada in 1942 as part of the Commonwealth Air Training Plan, and eventually became a pilot, serving in World War II.

Originally settling in Montreal, he was considered as a natural athlete, and excelled at cricket. He first represented Canada in 1951, during a tour of the country by the Marylebone Cricket Club. After playing against them for Quebec in early August, he made his debut for the national side later that month, playing against the MCC at Stanley Park.

After a second match for Canada against the MCC in Calgary, he made his first-class debut in September, playing for Canada against the MCC at the Toronto Cricket, Skating and Curling Club.

In 1952, he played for Canada against the USA and in 1954 toured England with the Canadian side, playing two more first-class matches - against Essex and Warwickshire. In a match against the MCC at Lord's he took the wicket of former England captain Gubby Allen in the first innings and then took the final wicket in the second innings as Canada won by 13 runs.

He holds an unenviable record in Canadian cricket - the most runs conceded off a single over. In 1953, playing for the Montreal Cricket Association against the Ottawa Valley Cricket Council, he conceded 34 runs off one over.

He eventually moved to the Niagara area in 1983, and died in Welland Hospital in March 2009.

== Personal life ==
He was married twice and had four children and five grandchildren. He was a member of the Sawmill Golf Club for 25 years, and was a fan of the Toronto Blue Jays.
