= Hal Padmore =

Canadian cricketer

Personal information
- Full name: Hal Dacosta S Padmore
- Born: 12 November 1927; Barbados
- Died: February 1995 (aged 67–68); Waltham Forest, Essex, England
- Batting: Right-handed
- Bowling: Right-arm medium

Domestic team information
- Years: Team
- 1951 & 1954: Canada

Career statistics
Competition	First-class
Matches	3
Runs scored	34
Batting average	8.50
100s/50s	–/–
Top score	15*
Balls bowled	572
Wickets	14
Bowling average	22.28
5 wickets in innings	1
10 wickets in match	–
Best bowling	5/47
Catches/stumpings	1/–
- Source: CricketArchive, 14 October 2011

Hal Dacosta S. Padmore (12 November 1927 in Barbados – February 1995 in Essex, England) was a Canadian cricketer. He was a right-handed batsman and right-arm medium pace bowler. He played three first-class matches for Canada between 1951 and 1954, taking 14 wickets at an average of 22.28.
