= Percy Henderson =

Canadian cricketer

Personal information
- Full name: Percy Elmo Henderson
- Born: 1879; Canada
- Died: 16 January 1934 (aged 55); Toronto, Ontario, Canada
- Batting: Unknown
- Role: Wicket-keeper

Career statistics
Competition	First-class
Matches	1
Runs scored	9
Batting average	4.50
100s/50s	–/–
Top score	7
Catches/stumpings	–/–
- Source: Cricinfo, 30 January 2022

Percy Elmo Henderson (1879 – 16 January 1934) was a Canadian first-class cricketer.

Henderson was born in Canada in 1879. A member of the Toronto Cricket Club, he toured England in 1910 with the Toronto I Zingari. He later made a single appearance in first-class cricket for a combined Canada and United States of America cricket team against the touring Australians at Philadelphia in 1913. Playing as a wicket-keeper, he scored he scored 2 runs in the Canada/United States first innings before being dismissed by Arthur Mailey, while in their second innings he was dismissed for 7 runs by Sid Emery, with the Australians winning the match by 409 runs. He toured England again in 1922, with a team headed by Norman Seagram, President of the Toronto Cricket Club. Henderson died at Toronto in January 1934, aged 55.
