= Arthur Hendy =

Canadian cricketer

Personal information
- Full name: Arthur Sydney "Bill" Hendy
- Born: 1912; Barbados
- Died: 9 September 1973 (aged 60–61); British Columbia, Canada
- Batting: Left-handed
- Bowling: Slow left-arm orthodox

Domestic team information
- Years: Team
- 1951 & 1954: Canada

Career statistics
| Competition | First-class |
|---|---|
| Matches | 4 |
| Runs scored | 46 |
| Batting average | 7.66 |
| 100s/50s | –/– |
| Top score | 22 |
| Balls bowled | 451 |
| Wickets | 10 |
| Bowling average | 22.20 |
| 5 wickets in innings | – |
| 10 wickets in match | – |
| Best bowling | 4/73 |
| Catches/stumpings | 2/– |
- Source: CricketArchive, 14 October 2011

Arthur Sydney "Bill" Hendy (1912 - 9 September 1973) is a Canadian former cricketer. He was a left-handed batsman and a left-arm spin bowler. He played four first-class for Canada between 1951 and 1954, taking 10 wickets at an average of 22.20.
