= Garnet Brisbane =

Canadian cricketer

Personal information
- Full name: Garnet Ernest Brisbane
- Born: 31 December 1938 (age 87); Saint Vincent
- Batting: Right-handed
- Bowling: Left-arm orthodox

International information
- National side: Canada (1964–1979)

Domestic team information
- Years: Team
- 1958–1961: Windward Islands
- 1961–1962: Combined Islands
- Source: CricketArchive, 2 February 2016

Garnet Ernest Brisbane (born 31 December 1938) is a former international cricketer who captained Canada at the 1979 ICC Trophy. He was born in Saint Vincent, and before emigrating to Canada played at first-class level in the West Indies.

A left-arm orthodox bowler who batted right-handed, Brisbane made his senior debut for the Windward Islands in January 1958, against the touring Pakistanis. His first-class debut came in December 1959, against a touring English team, which was the inaugural first-class fixture played by the Windwards. Brisbane played another first-class match for the Windwards during the following season, and then appeared twice for the Combined Islands during the 1961–62 season. Against British Guiana in October 1961, he took figures of 4/58, dismissing two West Indies internationals (Glendon Gibbs and Charlie Stayers).

After emigrating to Canada, Brisbane made his debut for the national team in September 1964, playing against the United States in the annual Auty Cup fixture. He was a regular in the team throughout the 1960s and 1970s, participating in tours of England and the West Indies and playing matches against various touring international sides. At the 1979 ICC Trophy in England, Brisbane was appointed Canada's captain, aged 41. However, he missed two of his team's games (against Fiji and Bermuda, with Bryan Mauricette substituting. His best performance at the tournament came against Bangladesh, when he scored 34 runs. Canada finished runner-up to Sri Lanka, qualifying for the 1979 World Cup, but Brisbane did not return to the team for that event. He was inducted into the Canadian Cricket Hall of Fame in 2014.
