= Bryan Mauricette =

Canadian cricketer (born 1946)

Personal information
- Born: 4 September 1946 (age 80); Saint Lucia
- Batting: Right-handed

International information
- National side: Canada (1979)
- ODI debut (cap 5): 9 June 1979 v Pakistan
- Last ODI: 16 June 1979 v Australia

Career statistics
Competition	ODI
Matches	3
Runs scored	20
Batting average	6.66
100s/50s	0/0
Top score	15
Catches/stumpings	1/–
- Source: ESPNcricinfo, 17 September 2020

Bryan Michael Mauricette (born 4 September 1946) is a Canadian former cricketer: a right-handed wicketkeeper-batsman who played a handful of first-class matches (and one List A game) for the Windward Islands between 1966–67 and 1972–73 without ever passing 20.

He later played for Canada in both the 1979 ICC Trophy and the same year's World Cup. His new country lost all three of their World Cup matches by large margins, with Mauricette making just 20 runs in his three ODI innings. His ICC Trophy performances were also mostly poor, although he did make 72 in the semi-final victory against Bermuda.

Mauricette later became involved in coaching, and coached Canada at the 2004 ICC Six Nations Challenge.
