= Rosedale Cricket Ground =

Cricket ground in Toronto, Ontario

Rosedale
- Interactive map of Rosedale
- Location: Toronto, Ontario, Canada
- Country: Canada
- Coordinates: 43.683°N 79.379°W
- Establishment: 1887 (first recorded match)
- As of 4 October 2011; Source: Ground profile

Rosedale was the name of a cricket ground in Toronto, Ontario, Canada. The first recorded match on the ground was in 1887 when Rosedale played West Toronto.

The ground held a single first-class match between a combined Canada and United States of America team against the touring Australians in 1913.

The Australians won the match by the large margin of an innings and 147 runs. The final recorded match held on the ground came in 1954 between Toronto and Yorkshire (not to be confused with the English county team of the same name).
