= 2010–11 Indian cricket season =

2010–11 Indian Cricket Season
2011 ICC Cricket World Cup
- Champions: India
- Runners-up: Sri Lanka

Ranji Trophy
- Champions: Rajasthan
- Runners-up: Baroda

Vijay Hazare Trophy
- Champions: Jharkhand
- Runners-up: Gujarat

Syed Mushtaq Ali Trophy
- Champions: Bengal
- Runners-up: Madhya Pradesh

The 2010–11 Indian cricket season was from late September 2010 to March 2011.

== Overview ==
International tours
Start date	Against	Results [Matches]		
Start date	Against	Test	ODI	T20I
25 Sept 2010	Australia	2–0 [2]	1–0 [3]	—
4 Nov 2010	New Zealand	1–0 [3]	5–0 [5]	—
8 Jan 2011	(Cricket West Indies) West Indies		3–2 [5]	2–1 [3]
International tournaments
Start date	Tournament		Winners	
6 February 2011	World Cup		India	
Domestic Tournament
Start date	Tournament		Winners	
1 October 2010	Irani Cup		Rest of India	
8 October 2010	NKP Salve Challenger Trophy		India Blue	
14 October 2010	Syed Mushtaq Ali Trophy		Bengal	
1 November 2010	Ranji Trophy		Rajasthan	
9 December	Women's Challenger Trophy		India Blue	
19 January 2011	Duleep Trophy		South Zone	
10 February	Vijay Hazare Trophy		Jharkhand	
6 March 2011	Deodhar Trophy		North Zone	

== International Cricket ==
=== Australia in India ===
No.	Date	Home captain	Away captain	Venue	Result
Test series
Test 1972	1–5 October	Mahendra Singh Dhoni	Ricky Ponting	Punjab Cricket Association Stadium, Mohali	India by 1 wicket
Test 1973	9–13 October	Mahendra Singh Dhoni	Ricky Ponting	M. Chinnaswamy Stadium, Bangalore	India by 7 wickets
ODI series
ODI 3058a	17 October	Mahendra Singh Dhoni	Michael Clarke	Nehru Stadium, Kochi	Match abandoned
ODI 3060	20 October	Mahendra Singh Dhoni	Michael Clarke	Dr. Y.S. Rajashekhara Reddy ACA-VDCA Cricket Stadium, Visakhapatnam	India by 5 wickets
ODI 3061a	24 October	Mahendra Singh Dhoni	Michael Clarke	Nehru Stadium, Fatorda	Match abandoned

=== New Zealand in India ===
No.	Date	Home captain	Away captain	Venue	Result
Test series
Test 1974	4–8 November	Mahendra Singh Dhoni	Daniel Vettori	Sardar Patel Stadium, Ahmedabad	Match drawn
Test 1975	12–16 November	Mahendra Singh Dhoni	Daniel Vettori	Rajiv Gandhi International Stadium, Hyderabad	Match drawn
Test 1978	20–24 November	Mahendra Singh Dhoni	Daniel Vettori	Vidarbha Cricket Association Stadium, Nagpur	India by an innings and 198 runs
ODI series
ODI 3070	28 November	Gautam Gambhir	Ross Taylor	Nehru Stadium, Guwahati	India by 40 runs
ODI 3072	1 December	Gautam Gambhir	Ross Taylor	Sawai Mansingh Stadium, Jaipur	India by 8 wickets
ODI 3074	4 December	Gautam Gambhir	Daniel Vettori	Reliance Stadium, Vadodara	India by 9 wickets
ODI 3076	7 December	Gautam Gambhir	Daniel Vettori	M. Chinnaswamy Stadium, Bangalore	India by 5 wickets
ODI 3077	10 December	Gautam Gambhir	Daniel Vettori	M.A. Chidambaram Stadium, Chennai	India by 8 wickets

=== West Indies women in India ===
No.	Date	Home captain	Away captain	Venue	Result
Tour Match
Tour Match	8 January 2011	Diana David	Merissa Aguilleira	Bandra Kurla Complex, Mumbai	West Indies Women won by 5 wickets
Women's ODI series
WODI 765	10 January 2011	Jhulan Goswami	Merissa Aguilleira	Bandra Kurla Complex, Mumbai	West Indies Women won by 9 wickets
WODI 766	13 January 2011	Jhulan Goswami	Merissa Aguilleira	Reliance Stadium, Vadodara	India Women won by 10 runs
WODI 767	15 January 2011	Jhulan Goswami	Merissa Aguilleira	Reliance Stadium, Vadodara	West Indies Women won by 3 wickets
WODI 768	18 January 2011	Jhulan Goswami	Merissa Aguilleira	Madhavrao Scindia Cricket Ground, Rajkot	India Women won by 10 runs
WODI 769	19 January 2011	Jhulan Goswami	Merissa Aguilleira	Madhavrao Scindia Cricket Ground, Rajkot	India Women won by 57 runs
Women's T20I series
WT20I 98	22 January 2011	Jhulan Goswami	Merissa Aguilleira	Sardar Patel Stadium, Ahmedabad	India Women won by 6 wickets
WT20I 99	23 January 2011	Jhulan Goswami	Merissa Aguilleira	Sardar Patel Stadium, Ahmedabad	West Indies Women won by 3 runs
WT20I 100	24 January 2011	Jhulan Goswami	Merissa Aguilleira	Sardar Patel Stadium, Ahmedabad	India Women won by 15 runs

=== World Cup ===
India Co-hosted the 2011 ICC Cricket world cup with Bangladesh and Sri Lanka.

==== Warm-up matches ====
No.	Date	Team 1	Captain 1	Team 2	Captain 2	Venue	Result
Match 1	6 February	Afghanistan	Hamid Hassan	Kenya	Jimmy Kamande	ICC Global Cricket Academy Ground No 2, Dubai	Kenya by 49 runs
Match 2	6 February	Canada	Ashish Bagai	Netherlands	Peter Borren	ICC Global Cricket Academy, Dubai	Canada by 4 wickets
Match 3	6 February	Ireland	William Porterfield	Zimbabwe	Elton Chigumbura	Dubai International Cricket Stadium, Dubai	Zimbabwe by 6 wickets
Match 4	8 February	Afghanistan	Hamid Hassan	Canada	Ashish Bagai	ICC Global Cricket Academy Ground No 2, Dubai	Afghanistan by 5 wickets
Match 5	8 February	Ireland	Kevin O'Brien	Kenya	Thomas Odoyo	ICC Global Cricket Academy, Dubai	Kenya by 3 wickets
Match 6	8 February	Netherlands	Peter Borren	Zimbabwe	Elton Chigumbura	Dubai International Cricket Stadium, Dubai	Zimbabwe by 115 runs
Match 7	12 February	West Indies	Darren Sammy	Kenya	Jimmy Kamande	R Premadasa Stadium, Colombo	West Indies by 61 runs
Match 8	12 February	Sri Lanka	Kumar Sangakkara	Netherlands	Peter Borren	Sinhalese Sports Club Ground, Colombo	Sri Lanka by 156 runs
Match 9	12 February	Canada	Ashish Bagai	Bangladesh	Shakib Al Hasan	Zahur Ahmed Chowdhury Stadium, Chittagong	Bangladesh by 9 wickets
Match 10	12 February	New Zealand	Daniel Vettori	Ireland	William Porterfield	Vidarbha Cricket Association Stadium, Jamtha, Nagpur	New Zealand by 32 runs
Match 11	12 February	Zimbabwe	Elton Chigumbura	South Africa	Graeme Smith	MA Chidambaram Stadium, Chepauk, Chennai	South Africa by 8 wickets
Match 12	13 February	India	Mahendra Singh Dhoni	Australia	Ricky Ponting	M Chinnaswamy Stadium, Bangalore	India by 38 runs
Match 13	15 February	Zimbabwe	Elton Chigumbura	Ireland	William Porterfield	Vidarbha Cricket Association Stadium, Jamtha, Nagpur	Ireland by 4 wickets
Match 14	15 February	Kenya	Jimmy Kamande	Netherlands	Bas Zuiderent	Sinhalese Sports Club Ground, Colombo	Netherlands by 2 wickets
Match 15	15 February	Pakistan	Shahid Afridi	Bangladesh	Shakib Al Hasan	Sher-e-Bangla National Stadium, Mirpur, Dhaka	Pakistan by 89 runs
Match 16	15 February	Australia	Ricky Ponting	South Africa	Graeme Smith	M Chinnaswamy Stadium, Bangalore	South Africa by 7 wickets
Match 17	15 February	West Indies	Darren Sammy	Sri Lanka	Kumar Sangakkara	R Premadasa Stadium, Colombo	Sri Lanka by 4 wickets
Match 18	16 February	Canada	Ashish Bagai	England	Andrew Strauss	Fatullah Osmani Stadium, Fatullah	England by 16 runs
Match 19	16 February	India	Mahendra Singh Dhoni	New Zealand	Ross Taylor	MA Chidambaram Stadium, Chepauk, Chennai	India by 117 runs
Match 20	18 February	England	Andrew Strauss	Pakistan	Misbah-ul-Haq	Fatullah Osmani Stadium, Fatullah	England by 67 runs

==== Group stage ====
Group A

Pos	Team	Pld	W	L	T	NR	Pts	NRR
1	Pakistan	6	5	1	0	0	10	0.758
2	Sri Lanka	6	4	1	0	1	9	2.582
3	Australia	6	4	1	0	1	9	1.123
4	New Zealand	6	4	2	0	0	8	1.135
5	Zimbabwe	6	2	4	0	0	4	0.030
6	Canada	6	1	5	0	0	2	−1.987
7	Kenya	6	0	6	0	0	0	−3.042

Source: ESPNcricinfo

Group B

Pos	Team	Pld	W	L	T	NR	Pts	NRR
1	South Africa	6	5	1	0	0	10	2.026
2	India	6	4	1	1	0	9	0.900
3	England	6	3	2	1	0	7	0.072
4	West Indies	6	3	3	0	0	6	1.066
5	Bangladesh	6	3	3	0	0	6	−1.361
6	Ireland	6	2	4	0	0	4	−0.696
7	Netherlands	6	0	6	0	0	0	−2.045

Source: ESPNcricinfo

Group stage
No.	Date	Team 1	Captain 1	Team 2	Captain 2	Venue	Result
ODI 3100	19 February	India	Mahendra Singh Dhoni	Bangladesh	Shakib Al Hasan	Sher-e-Bangla National Stadium, Mirpur, Dhaka	India by 87 runs
ODI 3101	20 February	New Zealand	Daniel Vettori	Kenya	Jimmy Kamande	MA Chidambaram Stadium, Chepauk, Chennai	New Zealand by 10 wickets
ODI 3102	20 February	Sri Lanka	Kumar Sangakkara	Canada	Ashish Bagai	Mahinda Rajapaksa International Cricket Stadium, Hambantota	Sri Lanka by 210 runs
ODI 3103	21 February	Australia	Ricky Ponting	Zimbabwe	Elton Chigumbura	Sardar Patel Stadium, Motera, Ahmedabad	Australia by 91 runs
ODI 3104	22 February	Netherlands	Peter Borren	England	Andrew Strauss	Vidarbha Cricket Association Stadium, Jamtha, Nagpur	England by 6 wickets
ODI 3105	23 February	Pakistan	Shahid Afridi	Kenya	Jimmy Kamande	Mahinda Rajapaksha International Cricket Stadium, Hambantota	Pakistan by 205 runs
ODI 3106	24 February	West Indies	Darren Sammy	South Africa	Graeme Smith	Feroz Shah Kotla, New Delhi	South Africa by 7 wickets
ODI 3107	25 February	New Zealand	Daniel Vettori	Australia	Ricky Ponting	Vidarbha Cricket Association Stadium, Jamtha, Nagpur	Australia by 7 wickets
ODI 3108	25 February	Bangladesh	Shakib Al Hasan	Ireland	William Porterfield	Sher-e-Bangla National Stadium, Mirpur, Dhaka	Bangladesh by 27 runs
ODI 3109	26 February	Pakistan	Shahid Afridi	Sri Lanka	Kumar Sangakkara	R Premadasa Stadium, Colombo	Pakistan by 11 runs
ODI 3110	27 February	India	Mahendra Singh Dhoni	England	Andrew Strauss	M Chinnaswamy Stadium, Bangalore	Match tied
ODI 3111	28 February	Zimbabwe	Elton Chigumbura	Canada	Ashish Bagai	Vidarbha Cricket Association Stadium, Jamtha, Nagpur	Zimbabwe by 175 runs
ODI 3112	28 February	West Indies	Darren Sammy	Netherlands	Peter Borren	Feroz Shah Kotla, Delhi	West Indies by 215 runs
ODI 3113	1 March	Kenya	Jimmy Kamande	Sri Lanka	Kumar Sangakkara	R Premadasa Stadium, Colombo	Sri Lanka by 9 wickets
ODI 3114	2 March	England	Andrew Strauss	Ireland	William Porterfield	M Chinnaswamy Stadium, Bangalore	Ireland by 3 wickets
ODI 3115	3 March	South Africa	Graeme Smith	Netherlands	Peter Borren	Punjab Cricket Association Stadium, Mohali, Chandigarh	South Africa by 231 runs
ODI 3116	3 March	Pakistan	Shahid Afridi	Canada	Ashish Bagai	R Premadasa Stadium, Colombo	Pakistan by 46 runs
ODI 3117	4 March	New Zealand	Daniel Vettori	Zimbabwe	Elton Chigumbura	Sardar Patel Stadium, Motera, Ahmedabad	New Zealand by 10 wickets
ODI 3118	4 March	Bangladesh	Shakib Al Hasan	West Indies	Darren Sammy	Sher-e-Bangla National Stadium, Mirpur Dhaka	West Indies by 9 wickets
ODI 3119	5 March	Sri Lanka	Kumar Sangakkara	Australia	Ricky Ponting	R Premadasa Stadium, Colombo	No result
ODI 3120	6 March	England	Andrew Strauss	South Africa	Graeme Smith	MA Chidambaram Stadium, Chepauk, Chennai	England by 6 runs
ODI 3121	6 March	India	Mahendra Singh Dhoni	Ireland	William Porterfield	M Chinnaswamy Stadium, Bangalore	India by 5 wickets
ODI 3122	7 March	Kenya	Jimmy Kamande	Canada	Ashish Bagai	Feroz Shah Kotla, Delhi	Canada by 5 wickets
ODI 3123	8 March	Pakistan	Shahid Afridi	New Zealand	Daniel Vettori	Pallekele International Cricket Stadium, Kandy	New Zealand by 110 runs
ODI 3124	9 March	India	Mahendra Singh Dhoni	Netherlands	Peter Borren	Feroz Shah Kotla, New Delhi	India by 5 wickets
ODI 3125	10 March	Sri Lanka	Kumar Sangakkara	Zimbabwe	Elton Chigumbura	Pallekele International Cricket Stadium, Kandy	Sri Lanka by 139 runs
ODI 3126	11 March	Ireland	William Porterfield	West Indies	Darren Sammy	Punjab Cricket Association Stadium, Mohali, Chandigarh	West Indies by 44 runs
ODI 3127	11 March	Bangladesh	Shakib Al Hasan	England	Andrew Strauss	Zahur Ahmed Chowdhury Stadium, Chittagong	Bangladesh by 2 wickets
ODI 3128	12 March	India	Mahendra Singh Dhoni	South Africa	Graeme Smith	Vidarbha Cricket Association Stadium, Jamtha, Nagpur	South Africa by 3 wickets
ODI 3129	13 March	New Zealand	Ross Taylor	Canada	Ashish Bagai	Wankhede Stadium, Mumbai	New Zealand by 97 runs
ODI 3130	13 March	Australia	Ricky Ponting	Kenya	Jimmy Kamande	M Chinnaswamy Stadium, Bangalore	Australia by 60 runs
ODI 3131	14 March	Bangladesh	Shakib Al Hasan	Netherlands	Peter Borren	Zahur Ahmed Chowdhury Stadium, Chittagong	Bangladesh by 6 wickets
ODI 3132	14 March	Pakistan	Shahid Afridi	Zimbabwe	Elton Chigumbura	Pallekele International Cricket Stadium, Kandy	Pakistan by 7 wickets (D/L)
ODI 3133	15 March	South Africa	Graeme Smith	Ireland	William Porterfield	Eden Gardens, Kolkata	South Africa by 131 runs
ODI 3134	16 March	Australia	Ricky Ponting	Canada	Ashish Bagai	M Chinnaswamy Stadium, Bangalore	Australia by 7 wickets
ODI 3135	17 March	England	Andrew Strauss	West Indies	Darren Sammy	MA Chidambaram Stadium, Chepauk, Chennai	England by 18 runs
ODI 3136	18 March	Ireland	William Porterfield	Netherlands	Peter Borren	Eden Gardens, Kolkata	Ireland by 6 wickets
ODI 3137	18 March	Sri Lanka	Kumar Sangakkara	New Zealand	Ross Taylor	Wankhede Stadium, Mumbai	Sri Lanka by 112 runs
ODI 3138	19 March	Bangladesh	Shakib Al Hasan	South Africa	Graeme Smith	Sher-e-Bangla National Stadium, Mirpur, Dhaka	South Africa by 206 runs
ODI 3139	19 March	Pakistan	Shahid Afridi	Australia	Ricky Ponting	R Premadasa Stadium, Colombo	Pakistan by 4 wickets
ODI 3140	20 March	Zimbabwe	Elton Chigumbura	Kenya	Steve Tikolo	Eden Gardens, Kolkata	Zimbabwe by 161 runs
ODI 3141	20 March	India	Mahendra Singh Dhoni	West Indies	Darren Sammy	MA Chidambaram Stadium, Chepauk, Chennai	India by 80 runs

==== Knockout ====
Knockout stage
No.	Date	Team 1	Captain 1	Team 2	Captain 2	Venue	Result
Quarterfinals
ODI 3142	23 March	Pakistan	Shahid Afridi	West Indies	Darren Sammy	Sher-e-Bangla National Stadium, Mirpur, Dhaka	Pakistan by 10 wickets
ODI 3143	24 March	Australia	Ricky Ponting	India	Mahendra Singh Dhoni	Sardar Patel Stadium, Motera, Ahmedabad	India by 5 wickets
ODI 3144	25 March	New Zealand	Daniel Vettori	South Africa	Graeme Smith	Sher-e-Bangla National Stadium, Mirpur, Dhaka	New Zealand by 49 runs
ODI 3145	26 March	Sri Lanka	Kumar Sangakkara	England	Andrew Strauss	R Premadasa Stadium, Colombo	Sri Lanka by 10 wickets
Semifinals
ODI 3146	29 March	New Zealand	Daniel Vettori	Sri Lanka	Kumar Sangakkara	R Premadasa Stadium, Colombo	Sri Lanka by 5 wickets
ODI 3147	30 March	Pakistan	Shahid Afridi	India	Mahendra Singh Dhoni	Punjab Cricket Association Stadium, Mohali, Chandigarh	India by 29 runs
Final
ODI 3148	2 April	India	Mahendra Singh Dhoni	Sri Lanka	Kumar Sangakkara	Wankhede Stadium, Mumbai	India by 6 wickets
