= International cricket in 2010–11 =

The 2010–11 international cricket season was from October 2010 to April 2011. It included the 2011 Cricket World Cup, won by co-host India.

== Season overview ==
International tours
Start date	Home team	Away team	Results [Matches]		
Start date	Home team	Away team	Test	ODI	T20I
26 September 2010	Zimbabwe	Ireland	—	2–1 [3]	—
1 October 2010	India	Australia	2–0 [2]	1–0 [3]	—
5 October 2010	Bangladesh	New Zealand	—	4–0 [5]	—
8 October 2010	South Africa	Zimbabwe	—	3–0 [3]	2–0 [2]
26 October 2010	Pakistan	South Africa	0–0 [2]	2–3 [5]	0–2 [2]
31 October 2010	Australia	Sri Lanka	—	1–2 [3]	0–1 [1]
4 November 2010	India	New Zealand	1–0 [3]	5–0 [5]	—
15 November 2010	Sri Lanka	West Indies	0–0 [3]	2–0 [3]	—
25 November 2010	Australia	England	1–3 [5]	6–1 [7]	1–1 [2]
1 December 2010	Bangladesh	Zimbabwe	—	3–1 [5]	—
16 December 2010	South Africa	India	1–1 [3]	3–2 [5]	0–1 [1]
26 December 2010	New Zealand	Pakistan	0–1 [2]	2–3 [6]	2–1 [3]
International tournaments
Start date	Tournament			Winners	
6 February 2011	(India) (Sri Lanka) (Bangladesh) World Cup			India	
Women's international tournaments
Start date	Tournament			Winners	
6 October 2010	(South Africa) Women's ODI Challenge			South Africa	
14 October 2010	(South Africa) Women's T20 Challenge			West Indies	
21 April 2011	(Sri Lanka) Women's ODI Quadrangular Series			Pakistan	
24 April 2011	(Sri Lanka) Women's T20 Quadrangular Series			Pakistan	
Minor tours
Start date	Home team	Away team	Results [Matches]		
Start date	Home team	Away team	First-class		List A
31 August 2010	Canada	Ireland	0–1 [1]		1–1 [2]
2 October 2010	Kenya	Afghanistan	0–1 [1]		2–1 [3]
Minor tournaments
Start date	Tournament			Winners	
6 November 2010	(Kuwait) ICC World Cricket League Division Eight			Kuwait	
2 December 2010	(United Arab Emirates) ICC Intercontinental Cup Final			Afghanistan	
22 January 2011	(Hong Kong) ICC World Cricket League Division Three			Hong Kong	

== Pre-season rankings ==
ICC Test Championship 24 November 2010
Rank	Team	Matches	Points	Rating
1	India	38	4893	129
2	South Africa	32	3712	116
3	Sri Lanka	23	2635	115
4	England	39	4355	112
5	Australia	37	4061	110
6	Pakistan	26	2275	88
7	New Zealand	29	2318	80
8	West Indies	21	1668	79
9	Bangladesh	19	131	7
10	Zimbabwe	15	110	5

ICC ODI Championship 28 November 2010
Rank	Team	Matches	Points	Rating
1	Australia	36	4595	128
2	India	35	4139	118
3	Sri Lanka	33	3892	118
4	South Africa	25	2873	115
5	England	28	3147	112
6	Pakistan	27	2704	100
7	New Zealand	25	2374	95
8	Bangladesh	28	1867	67
9	West Indies	18	1207	67
10	Ireland	11	425	39
11	Zimbabwe	30	1110	37
12	Netherlands	6	103	17
13	Kenya	8	1	0

== September ==
=== Ireland in Canada ===
2009–10 ICC Intercontinental Cup
No.	Date	Home captain	Away captain	Venue	Result
First-class	31 August–3 September	Ashish Bagai	Trent Johnston	Toronto Cricket, Skating and Curling Club, Toronto	Ireland by 6 wickets
ODI series
No.	Date	Home captain	Away captain	Venue	Result
ODI 3041	6 September	Ashish Bagai	Trent Johnston	Toronto Cricket, Skating and Curling Club, Toronto	Canada by 4 runs (D/L)
ODI 3042	7 September	Ashish Bagai	Trent Johnston	Toronto Cricket, Skating and Curling Club, Toronto	Ireland by 92 runs

=== Ireland in Zimbabwe ===
ODI series
No.	Date	Home captain	Away captain	Venue	Result
ODI 3048	26 September	Elton Chigumbura	William Porterfield	Harare Sports Club, Harare	Zimbabwe by 2 wickets
ODI 3049	28 September	Elton Chigumbura	William Porterfield	Harare Sports Club, Harare	Zimbabwe by 3 wickets
ODI 3050	30 September	Elton Chigumbura	William Porterfield	Harare Sports Club, Harare	Ireland by 20 runs

== October ==
=== Australia in India ===
No.	Date	Home captain	Away captain	Venue	Result
Test series
Test 1972	1–5 October	Mahendra Singh Dhoni	Ricky Ponting	Punjab Cricket Association Stadium, Mohali	India by 1 wicket
Test 1973	9–13 October	Mahendra Singh Dhoni	Ricky Ponting	M. Chinnaswamy Stadium, Bangalore	India by 7 wickets
ODI series
ODI 3058a	17 October	Mahendra Singh Dhoni	Michael Clarke	Nehru Stadium, Kochi	Match abandoned
ODI 3060	20 October	Mahendra Singh Dhoni	Michael Clarke	Dr. Y.S. Rajashekhara Reddy ACA-VDCA Cricket Stadium, Visakhapatnam	India by 5 wickets
ODI 3061a	24 October	Mahendra Singh Dhoni	Michael Clarke	Nehru Stadium, Fatorda	Match abandoned

=== Afghanistan in Kenya ===
2009–10 ICC Intercontinental Cup
No.	Date	Home captain	Away captain	Venue	Result
First-class	2–5 October	Morris Ouma	Nawroz Mangal	Gymkhana Club Ground, Nairobi	Afghanistan by 167 runs
No.	Date	Home captain	Away captain	Venue	Result
ODI series
ODI 3052	7 October	Jimmy Kamande	Nawroz Mangal	Gymkhana Club Ground, Nairobi	Kenya by 92 runs
ODI 3053	9 October	Jimmy Kamande	Nawroz Mangal	Gymkhana Club Ground, Nairobi	Afghanistan by 6 wickets
ODI 3055	11 October	Jimmy Kamande	Nawroz Mangal	Gymkhana Club Ground, Nairobi	Kenya by 8 wickets

=== New Zealand in Bangladesh ===
ODI series
No.	Date	Home captain	Away captain	Venue	Result
ODI 3051	5 October	Mashrafe Mortaza	Daniel Vettori	Sher-e-Bangla National Cricket Stadium, Dhaka	Bangladesh by 9 runs (D/L)
ODI 3052a	8 October	Shakib Al Hasan	Daniel Vettori	Sher-e-Bangla National Cricket Stadium, Dhaka	Match abandoned
ODI 3054	11 October	Shakib Al Hasan	Daniel Vettori	Sher-e-Bangla National Cricket Stadium, Dhaka	Bangladesh by 7 wickets
ODI 3056	14 October	Shakib Al Hasan	Daniel Vettori	Sher-e-Bangla National Cricket Stadium, Dhaka	Bangladesh by 9 runs
ODI 3058	17 October	Shakib Al Hasan	Daniel Vettori	Sher-e-Bangla National Cricket Stadium, Dhaka	Bangladesh by 3 runs

=== Zimbabwe in South Africa ===
No.	Date	Home captain	Away captain	Venue	Result
T20I series
T20I 188	8 October	Johan Botha	Elton Chigumbura	OUTsurance Oval, Bloemfontein	South Africa by 7 wickets
T20I 189	10 October	Johan Botha	Elton Chigumbura	De Beers Diamond Oval, Kimberley	South Africa by 8 runs
ODI series
ODI 3057	15 October	Graeme Smith	Elton Chigumbura	OUTsurance Oval, Bloemfontein	South Africa by 64 runs
ODI 3059	17 October	Graeme Smith	Elton Chigumbura	Senwes Park, Potchefstroom	South Africa by 8 wickets
ODI 3061	22 October	Graeme Smith	Elton Chigumbura	Willowmoore Park, Benoni	South Africa by 272 runs

=== Pakistan vs South Africa in UAE ===
No.	Date	Home captain	Away captain	Venue	Result
T20I series
T20I 190	26 October	Shahid Afridi	Johan Botha	Sheikh Zayed Stadium, Abu Dhabi	South Africa by 6 wickets
T20I 191	27 October	Shahid Afridi	Johan Botha	Sheikh Zayed Stadium, Abu Dhabi	South Africa by 6 wickets
ODI series
ODI 3062	29 October	Shahid Afridi	Graeme Smith	Sheikh Zayed Stadium, Abu Dhabi	South Africa by 8 wickets
ODI 3063	31 October	Shahid Afridi	Johan Botha	Sheikh Zayed Stadium, Abu Dhabi	Pakistan by 1 wicket
ODI 3064	2 November	Shahid Afridi	Johan Botha	Dubai International Cricket Stadium, Dubai	South Africa by 2 runs
ODI 3067	5 November	Shahid Afridi	Graeme Smith	Dubai International Cricket Stadium, Dubai	Pakistan by 1 wicket
ODI 3068	8 November	Shahid Afridi	Graeme Smith	Dubai International Cricket Stadium, Dubai	South Africa by 57 runs
Test series
Test 1976	12–16 November	Misbah-ul-Haq	Graeme Smith	Dubai International Cricket Stadium, Dubai	Match drawn
Test 1979	20–24 November	Misbah-ul-Haq	Graeme Smith	Sheikh Zayed Stadium, Abu Dhabi	Match drawn

== November ==
=== Sri Lanka in Australia ===
No.	Date	Home captain	Away captain	Venue	Result
Only T20I
T20I 192	31 October	Michael Clarke	Kumar Sangakkara	WACA Ground, Perth	Sri Lanka by 7 wickets
ODI series
ODI 3065	3 November	Michael Clarke	Kumar Sangakkara	Melbourne Cricket Ground, Melbourne	Sri Lanka by 1 wicket
ODI 3066	5 November	Ricky Ponting	Kumar Sangakkara	Sydney Cricket Ground, Sydney	Sri Lanka by 29 runs (D/L)
ODI 3068	7 November	Michael Clarke	Kumar Sangakkara	The Gabba, Brisbane	Australia by 8 wickets

=== ICC WCL Division Eight ===
==== Group stage ====
The ICC development committee confirmed the groups on 10 June 2010.

Group A
Pos	Team	Pld	W	L	T	NR	Pts	NRR
1	Kuwait	3	3	0	0	0	6	5.868
2	Vanuatu	3	2	1	0	0	4	1.047
3	Bhutan	3	1	2	0	0	2	−3.348
4	Suriname	3	0	3	0	0	0	−1.410

Group B
Pos	Team	Pld	W	L	T	NR	Pts	NRR
1	Germany	3	3	0	0	0	6	1.647
2	Zambia	3	2	1	0	0	4	1.047
3	Bahamas	3	1	2	0	0	2	−1.065
4	Gibraltar	3	0	3	0	0	0	−1.726

Group stage
No.	Date	Team 1	Captain 1	Team 2	Captain 2	Venue	Result
Match 1	6 November	Suriname	Shazam Ramjohn	Kuwait	Hisham Mirza	Sulabiya Ground, Kuwait City	Kuwait by 9 wickets
Match 2	6 November	Vanuatu	Andrew Mansale	Bhutan	Tshering Dorji	Doha Entertainment City Ground, Kuwait City	Vanuatu by 282 runs
Match 3	6 November	Gibraltar	Christian Rocca	Bahamas	Gregory Taylor	Kuwait Oil Company Unity Ground, Ahmadi City	Bahamas by 8 wickets
Match 4	6 November	Germany	Asif Khan	Zambia	Safraz Patel	Kuwait Oil Company Hubara Ground, Ahmadi City	Germany by 11 runs
Match 5	7 November	Bhutan	Tshering Dorji	Suriname	Shazam Ramjohn	Kuwait Oil Company Unity Ground, Ahmadi City	Bhutan by 11 runs
Match 6	7 November	Kuwait	Hisham Mirza	Vanuatu	Andrew Mansale	Kuwait Oil Company Hubara Ground, Ahmadi City	Kuwait by 161 runs
Match 7	7 November	Zambia	Safraz Patel	Bahamas	Gregory Taylor	Sulabiya Ground, Kuwait City	Zambia by 76 runs
Match 8	7 November	Germany	Asif Khan	Gibraltar	Christian Rocca	Doha Entertainment City Ground, Kuwait City	Germany by 130 runs
Match 9	9 November	Bhutan	Tshering Dorji	Kuwait	Hisham Mirza	Sulabiya Ground, Kuwait City	Kuwait by 8 wickets
Match 10	9 November	Suriname	Shazam Ramjohn	Vanuatu	Andrew Mansale	Doha Entertainment City Ground, Kuwait City	Vanuatu by 4 wickets
Match 11	9 November	Germany	Asif Khan	Bahamas	Gregory Taylor	Kuwait Oil Company Unity Ground, Ahmadi City	Germany by 106 runs
Match 12	9 November	Zambia	Safraz Patel	Gibraltar	Christian Rocca	Kuwait Oil Company Hubara Ground, Ahmadi City	Zambia by 92 runs
Playoffs
Semi-final	11 November	Germany	Asif Khan	Vanuatu	Andrew Mansale	Sulabiya Ground, Kuwait City	Germany by 92 runs
Semi-final	11 November	Zambia	Safraz Patel	Kuwait	Hisham Mirza	Doha Entertainment City Ground, Kuwait City	Kuwait by 3 wickets
3rd place playoff	12 November	Vanuatu	Andrew Mansale	Zambia	Safraz Patel	Kuwait Oil Company Unity Ground, Ahmadi City	Vanuatu by 5 wickets
Final	12 November	Germany	Asif Khan	Kuwait	Hisham Mirza	Kuwait Oil Company Hubara Ground, Ahmadi City	Kuwait by 6 wickets
5th place playoffs
Semi-final	11 November	Suriname	Shazam Ramjohn	Bahamas	Gregory Taylor	Kuwait Oil Company Unity Ground, Ahmadi City	Suriname by 36 runs
Semi-final	11 November	Gibraltar	Iain Latin	Bhutan	Tshering Dorji	Kuwait Oil Company Hubara Ground, Ahmadi City	Gibraltar by 56 runs
7th place playoff	12 November	Bahamas	Gregory Taylor	Bhutan	Tshering Dorji	Sulabiya Ground, Kuwait City	Bhutan by 2 wickets
5th place playoff	12 November	Gibraltar	Iain Latin	Suriname	Shazam Ramjohn	Doha Entertainment City Ground, Kuwait City	Suriname by 7 wickets

===== Final Placings =====
Pos	Team	Status
1st	Kuwait	Promoted to 2011 Global Division Seven
2nd	Germany	Promoted to 2011 Global Division Seven
3rd	Vanuatu	Remain in 2012 Global Division Eight
4th	Zambia	Relegated to regional competitions
5th	Suriname	Relegated to regional competitions
6th	Gibraltar	Relegated to regional competitions
7th	Bhutan	Relegated to regional competitions
8th	Bahamas	Relegated to regional competitions

=== New Zealand in India ===
No.	Date	Home captain	Away captain	Venue	Result
Test series
Test 1974	4–8 November	Mahendra Singh Dhoni	Daniel Vettori	Sardar Patel Stadium, Ahmedabad	Match drawn
Test 1975	12–16 November	Mahendra Singh Dhoni	Daniel Vettori	Rajiv Gandhi International Cricket Stadium, Hyderabad	Match drawn
Test 1978	20–24 November	Mahendra Singh Dhoni	Daniel Vettori	Vidarbha Cricket Association Stadium, Nagpur	India by an innings and 198 runs
ODI series
ODI 3070	28 November	Gautam Gambhir	Ross Taylor	Nehru Stadium, Guwahati	India by 40 runs
ODI 3072	1 December	Gautam Gambhir	Ross Taylor	Sawai Mansingh Stadium, Jaipur	India by 8 wickets
ODI 3074	4 December	Gautam Gambhir	Daniel Vettori	Reliance Stadium, Vadodara	India by 9 wickets
ODI 3076	7 December	Gautam Gambhir	Daniel Vettori	M. Chinnaswamy Stadium, Bengaluru	India by 5 wickets
ODI 3077	10 December	Gautam Gambhir	Daniel Vettori	M. A. Chidambaram Stadium, Chennai	India by 8 wickets

=== West Indies in Sri Lanka ===
No.	Date	Home captain	Away captain	Venue	Result
Test series
Test 1977	15–19 November	Kumar Sangakkara	Darren Sammy	Galle International Stadium, Galle	Match drawn
Test 1980	23–27 November	Kumar Sangakkara	Darren Sammy	R. Premadasa Stadium, Colombo	Match drawn
Test 1982	1–5 December	Kumar Sangakkara	Darren Sammy	Pallekele International Cricket Stadium, Kandy	Match drawn
ODI series
ODI 3092	31 January	Kumar Sangakkara	Darren Sammy	Sinhalese Sports Club Ground, Colombo	No result
ODI 3096	3 February	Kumar Sangakkara	Darren Sammy	Sinhalese Sports Club Cricket Ground, Colombo	Sri Lanka by 8 wickets (D/L)
ODI 3099	6 February	Kumar Sangakkara	Darren Sammy	Sinhalese Sports Club Cricket Ground, Colombo	Sri Lanka by 26 runs

=== England in Australia ===
No.	Date	Home captain	Away captain	Venue	Result
Test series
Test 1981	25–29 November	Ricky Ponting	Andrew Strauss	The Gabba, Brisbane	Match drawn
Test 1983	3–7 December	Ricky Ponting	Andrew Strauss	Adelaide Oval, Adelaide	England by an innings and 71 runs
Test 1984	16–20 December	Ricky Ponting	Andrew Strauss	WACA Ground, Perth	Australia by 267 runs
Test 1986	26–30 December	Ricky Ponting	Andrew Strauss	Melbourne Cricket Ground, Melbourne	England by an innings and 157 runs
Test 1989	3–7 January	Michael Clarke	Andrew Strauss	Sydney Cricket Ground, Sydney	England by an innings and 83 runs
T20I series
T20I 197	12 January	Cameron White	Paul Collingwood	Adelaide Oval, Adelaide	England by 1 wicket
T20I 198	14 January	Cameron White	Paul Collingwood	Melbourne Cricket Ground, Melbourne	Australia by 4 runs
ODI series
ODI 3081	16 January	Michael Clarke	Andrew Strauss	Melbourne Cricket Ground, Melbourne	Australia by 6 wickets
ODI 3083	21 January	Michael Clarke	Andrew Strauss	Bellerive Oval, Hobart	Australia by 46 runs
ODI 3086	23 January	Michael Clarke	Andrew Strauss	Sydney Cricket Ground, Sydney	Australia by 4 wickets
ODI 3089	26 January	Michael Clarke	Andrew Strauss	Adelaide Oval, Adelaide	England by 21 runs
ODI 3091	30 January	Michael Clarke	Andrew Strauss	Brisbane Cricket Ground, Brisbane	Australia by 51 runs
ODI 3094	2 February	Michael Clarke	Andrew Strauss	Sydney Cricket Ground, Sydney	Australia by 2 wickets
ODI 3098	6 February	Cameron White	Andrew Strauss	WACA Ground, Perth	Australia by 57 runs

== December ==
=== Zimbabwe in Bangladesh ===
No.	Date	Home captain	Away captain	Venue	Result
ODI series
ODI 3071	1 December	Shakib Al Hasan	Elton Chigumbura	Sher-e-Bangla National Cricket Stadium, Dhaka	Zimbabwe by 9 runs
ODI 3073	3 December	Shakib Al Hasan	Elton Chigumbura	Sher-e-Bangla National Cricket Stadium, Dhaka	Bangladesh by 6 wickets
ODI 3075	6 December	Shakib Al Hasan	Prosper Utseya	Sher-e-Bangla National Cricket Stadium, Dhaka	Bangladesh by 65 runs
ODI 3076a	10 December	Shakib Al Hasan	Elton Chigumbura	Zohur Ahmed Chowdhury Stadium, Chittagong	Match abandoned
ODI 3078	12 December	Shakib Al Hasan	Elton Chigumbura	Zohur Ahmed Chowdhury Stadium, Chittagong	Bangladesh by 6 wickets

=== India in South Africa ===
No.	Date	Home captain	Away captain	Venue	Result
Test series
Test 1985	16–20 December	Graeme Smith	Mahendra Singh Dhoni	SuperSport Park, Centurion	South Africa by an innings and 25 runs
Test 1987	26–30 December	Graeme Smith	Mahendra Singh Dhoni	Kingsmead, Durban	India by 87 runs
Test 1988	2–6 January	Graeme Smith	Mahendra Singh Dhoni	Newlands, Cape Town	Match drawn
Only T20I
T20I 196	9 January	Johan Botha	Mahendra Singh Dhoni	Moses Mabhida Stadium, Durban	India by 21 runs
ODI series
ODI 3079	12 January	Graeme Smith	Mahendra Singh Dhoni	Kingsmead, Durban	South Africa by 135 runs
ODI 3080	15 January	Graeme Smith	Mahendra Singh Dhoni	New Wanderers Stadium, Johannesburg	India by 1 run
ODI 3082	18 January	Graeme Smith	Mahendra Singh Dhoni	Newlands, Cape Town	India by 2 wickets
ODI 3084	21 January	Graeme Smith	Mahendra Singh Dhoni	St George's Park, Port Elizabeth	South Africa by 48 runs (D/L)
ODI 3087	23 January	Graeme Smith	Mahendra Singh Dhoni	SuperSport Park, Centurion	South Africa by 33 runs (D/L)

=== Pakistan in New Zealand ===
No.	Date	Home captain	Away captain	Venue	Result
T20I series
T20I 193	26 December	Ross Taylor	Shahid Afridi	Eden Park, Auckland	New Zealand by 5 wickets
T20I 194	28 December	Ross Taylor	Shahid Afridi	Seddon Park, Hamilton	New Zealand by 39 runs
T20I 195	30 December	Ross Taylor	Shahid Afridi	AMI Stadium, Christchurch	Pakistan by 103 runs
Test series
Test 1990	7–11 January	Daniel Vettori	Misbah-ul-Haq	Seddon Park, Hamilton	Pakistan by 10 wickets
Test 1991	15–19 January	Daniel Vettori	Misbah-ul-Haq	Basin Reserve, Wellington	Match drawn
ODI series
ODI 3085	22 January	Daniel Vettori	Shahid Afridi	Westpac Stadium, Wellington	New Zealand by 9 wickets
ODI 3088	26 January	Daniel Vettori	Shahid Afridi	Queenstown Events Centre, Queenstown	No result
ODI 3090	29 January	Ross Taylor	Shahid Afridi	AMI Stadium, Christchurch	Pakistan by 43 runs
ODI 3093	1 February	Daniel Vettori	Shahid Afridi	McLean Park, Napier	Pakistan by 2 wickets
ODI 3095	3 February	Ross Taylor	Shahid Afridi	Seddon Park, Hamilton	Pakistan by 41 runs
ODI 3097	5 February	Ross Taylor	Shahid Afridi	Eden Park, Auckland	New Zealand by 57 runs

== January ==
=== WCL Division Three ===
==== Group stage ====
Pos	Team	Pld	W	L	T	NR	Pts	NRR
1	Papua New Guinea	5	4	1	0	0	8	1.114
2	Hong Kong	5	3	2	0	0	6	0.833
3	Oman	5	3	2	0	0	6	0.077
4	Italy	5	2	3	0	0	4	−0.004
5	United States	5	2	3	0	0	4	−0.661
6	Denmark	5	1	4	0	0	2	−1.503

Group stage
No.	Date	Team 1	Captain 1	Team 2	Captain 2	Venue	Result
Match 1	22 January	Denmark	Michael Pedersen	Italy	Alessandro Bonora	Hong Kong Cricket Club	Italy by 7 wickets
Match 2	22 January	Hong Kong	Najeeb Amar	United States	Steve Massiah	Kowloon Cricket Club	United States by 7 wickets
Match 3	22 January	Papua New Guinea	Rarva Dikana	Oman	Hemal Mehta	Mission Road Ground, Mong Kok, Hong Kong	Papua New Guinea by 39 runs
Match 4	23 January	Denmark	Michael Pedersen	United States	Steve Massiah	Mission Road Ground, Mong Kok, Hong Kong	Denmark by 30 runs
Match 5	23 January	Hong Kong	Najeeb Amar	Oman	Hemal Mehta	Kowloon Cricket Club	Oman by 3 wickets
Match 6	23 January	Italy	Alessandro Bonora	Papua New Guinea	Rarva Dikana	Hong Kong Cricket Club	Papua New Guinea by 32 runs
Match 7	25 January	Hong Kong	Najeeb Amar	Denmark	Michael Pedersen	Mission Road Ground, Mong Kok, Hong Kong	Hong Kong by 7 wickets
Match 8	25 January	Italy	Alessandro Bonora	Oman	Hemal Mehta	Kowloon Cricket Club	Oman by 1 wicket
Match 9	25 January	Papua New Guinea	Rarva Dikana	United States	Steve Massiah	Hong Kong Cricket Club	Papua New Guinea by 7 wickets
Match 10	26 January	Denmark	Michael Pedersen	Papua New Guinea	Rarva Dikana	Kowloon Cricket Club	Papua New Guinea by 9 wickets
Match 11	26 January	Hong Kong	Najeeb Amar	Italy	Alessandro Bonora	Mission Road Ground, Mong Kok, Hong Kong	Hong Kong by 1 wicket
Match 12	26 January	Oman	Hemal Mehta	United States	Steve Massiah	Hong Kong Cricket Club	United States by 2 wickets
Match 13	28 January	Denmark	Michael Pedersen	Oman	Hemal Mehta	Kowloon Cricket Club	Oman by 4 wickets
Match 14	28 January	Hong Kong	Najeeb Amar	Papua New Guinea	Rarva Dikana	Hong Kong Cricket Club	Hong Kong by 93 runs
Match 15	28 January	Italy	Alessandro Bonora	United States	Steve Massiah	Mission Road Ground, Mong Kok, Hong Kong	Italy by 4 wickets
Playoffs
5th place playoff	29 January	United States	Steve Massiah	Denmark	Michael Pedersen	Mission Road Ground, Mong Kok, Hong Kong	Denmark by 84 runs
3rd place playoff	29 January	Oman	Hemal Mehta	Italy	Alessandro Bonora	Hong Kong Cricket Club	Oman by 8 wickets
Final	29 January	Papua New Guinea	Rarva Dikana	Hong Kong	Najeeb Amar	Kowloon Cricket Club	Hong Kong by 4 wickets

===== Final Placings =====
Pos	Team	Status
1st	Hong Kong	Promoted to Division Two for 2011
2nd	Papua New Guinea	Promoted to Division Two for 2011
3rd	Oman	Remained in Division Three for 2013
4th	Italy	Remained in Division Three for 2013
5th	Denmark	Relegated to Division Four for 2012
6th	United States	Relegated to Division Four for 2012

== February ==
=== 2011 Cricket World Cup ===
==== Group stage ====
Pos	Team	Pld	W	L	T	NR	Pts	NRR
1	Pakistan	6	5	1	0	0	10	0.758
2	Sri Lanka	6	4	1	0	1	9	2.582
3	Australia	6	4	1	0	1	9	1.123
4	New Zealand	6	4	2	0	0	8	1.135
5	Zimbabwe	6	2	4	0	0	4	0.030
6	Canada	6	1	5	0	0	2	−1.987
7	Kenya	6	0	6	0	0	0	−3.042

Source: ESPNcricinfo

Pos	Team	Pld	W	L	T	NR	Pts	NRR
1	South Africa	6	5	1	0	0	10	2.026
2	India	6	4	1	1	0	9	0.900
3	England	6	3	2	1	0	7	0.072
4	West Indies	6	3	3	0	0	6	1.066
5	Bangladesh	6	3	3	0	0	6	−1.361
6	Ireland	6	2	4	0	0	4	−0.696
7	Netherlands	6	0	6	0	0	0	−2.045

Source: ESPNcricinfo

Group stage
No.	Date	Team 1	Captain 1	Team 2	Captain 2	Venue	Result
ODI 3100	19 February	India	Mahendra Singh Dhoni	Bangladesh	Shakib Al Hasan	Sher-e-Bangla National Cricket Stadium, Dhaka	India by 87 runs
ODI 3101	20 February	New Zealand	Daniel Vettori	Kenya	Jimmy Kamande	M. A. Chidambaram Stadium, Chennai	New Zealand by 10 wickets
ODI 3102	20 February	Sri Lanka	Kumar Sangakkara	Canada	Ashish Bagai	Mahinda Rajapaksa International Cricket Stadium, Hambantota	Sri Lanka by 210 runs
ODI 3103	21 February	Australia	Ricky Ponting	Zimbabwe	Elton Chigumbura	Sardar Patel Stadium, Ahmedabad	Australia by 91 runs
ODI 3104	22 February	Netherlands	Peter Borren	England	Andrew Strauss	Vidarbha Cricket Association Stadium, Nagpur	England by 6 wickets
ODI 3105	23 February	Pakistan	Shahid Afridi	Kenya	Jimmy Kamande	Mahinda Rajapaksa International Cricket Stadium, Hambantota	Pakistan by 205 runs
ODI 3106	24 February	West Indies	Darren Sammy	South Africa	Graeme Smith	Feroz Shah Kotla Ground, Delhi	South Africa by 7 wickets
ODI 3107	25 February	New Zealand	Daniel Vettori	Australia	Ricky Ponting	Vidarbha Cricket Association Stadium, Nagpur	Australia by 7 wickets
ODI 3108	25 February	Bangladesh	Shakib Al Hasan	Ireland	William Porterfield	Sher-e-Bangla National Cricket Stadium, Dhaka	Bangladesh by 27 runs
ODI 3109	26 February	Pakistan	Shahid Afridi	Sri Lanka	Kumar Sangakkara	R. Premadasa Stadium, Colombo	Pakistan by 11 runs
ODI 3110	27 February	India	Mahendra Singh Dhoni	England	Andrew Strauss	M. Chinnaswamy Stadium, Bengaluru	Match tied
ODI 3111	28 February	Zimbabwe	Elton Chigumbura	Canada	Ashish Bagai	Vidarbha Cricket Association Stadium, Nagpur	Zimbabwe by 175 runs
ODI 3112	28 February	West Indies	Daren Sammy	Netherlands	Peter Borren	Feroz Shah Kotla Ground, Delhi	West Indies by 215 runs
ODI 3113	1 March	Kenya	Jimmy Kamande	Sri Lanka	Kumar Sangakkara	R. Premadasa Stadium, Colombo	Sri Lanka by 9 wickets
ODI 3114	2 March	England	Andrew Strauss	Ireland	William Porterfield	M. Chinnaswamy Stadium, Bengaluru	Ireland by 3 wickets
ODI 3115	3 March	South Africa	Graeme Smith	Netherlands	Peter Borren	Punjab Cricket Association IS Bindra Stadium, Mohali, Chandigarh	South Africa by 231 runs
ODI 3116	3 March	Pakistan	Shahid Afridi	Canada	Ashish Bagai	R. Premadasa Stadium, Colombo	Pakistan by 46 runs
ODI 3117	4 March	New Zealand	Daniel Vettori	Zimbabwe	Elton Chigumbura	Sardar Patel Stadium, Ahmedabad	New Zealand by 10 wickets
ODI 3118	4 March	Bangladesh	Shakib Al Hasan	West Indies	Darren Sammy	Sher-e-Bangla National Cricket Stadium, Mirpur Dhaka	West Indies by 9 wickets
ODI 3119	5 March	Sri Lanka	Kumar Sangakkara	Australia	Ricky Ponting	R. Premadasa Stadium, Colombo	No result
ODI 3120	6 March	England	Andrew Strauss	South Africa	Graeme Smith	M. A. Chidambaram Stadium, Chennai	England by 6 runs
ODI 3121	6 March	India	Mahendra Singh Dhoni	Ireland	William Porterfield	M. Chinnaswamy Stadium, Bengaluru	India by 5 wickets
ODI 3122	7 March	Kenya	Jimmy Kamande	Canada	Ashish Bagai	Feroz Shah Kotla Ground, Delhi	Canada by 5 wickets
ODI 3123	8 March	Pakistan	Shahid Afridi	New Zealand	Daniel Vettori	Pallekele International Cricket Stadium, Kandy	New Zealand by 110 runs
ODI 3124	9 March	India	Mahendra Singh Dhoni	Netherlands	Peter Borren	Feroz Shah Kotla Ground, Delhi	India by 5 wickets
ODI 3125	10 March	Sri Lanka	Kumar Sangakkara	Zimbabwe	Elton Chigumbura	Pallekele International Cricket Stadium, Kandy	Sri Lanka by 139 runs
ODI 3126	11 March	West Indies	Darren Sammy	Ireland	William Porterfield	Punjab Cricket Association IS Bindra Stadium, Mohali	West Indies by 44 runs
ODI 3127	11 March	Bangladesh	Shakib Al Hasan	England	Andrew Strauss	Zohur Ahmed Chowdhury Stadium, Chittagong	Bangladesh by 2 wickets
ODI 3128	12 March	India	Mahendra Singh Dhoni	South Africa	Graeme Smith	Vidarbha Cricket Association Stadium, Nagpur	South Africa by 3 wickets
ODI 3129	13 March	New Zealand	Ross Taylor	Canada	Ashish Bagai	Wankhede Stadium, Mumbai	New Zealand by 97 runs
ODI 3130	13 March	Australia	Ricky Ponting	Kenya	Jimmy Kamande	M. Chinnaswamy Stadium, Bengaluru	Australia by 60 runs
ODI 3131	14 March	Bangladesh	Shakib Al Hasan	Netherlands	Peter Borren	Zohur Ahmed Chowdhury Stadium, Chittagong	Bangladesh by 6 wickets
ODI 3132	14 March	Pakistan	Shahid Afridi	Zimbabwe	Elton Chigumbura	Pallekele International Cricket Stadium, Kandy	Pakistan by 7 wickets (D/L)
ODI 3133	15 March	Ireland	William Porterfield	South Africa	Graeme Smith	Eden Gardens, Kolkata	South Africa by 131 runs
ODI 3134	16 March	Australia	Ricky Ponting	Canada	Ashish Bagai	M. Chinnaswamy Stadium, Bengaluru	Australia by 7 wickets
ODI 3135	17 March	England	Andrew Strauss	West Indies	Darren Sammy	M. A. Chidambaram Stadium, Chennai	England by 18 runs
ODI 3136	18 March	Ireland	William Porterfield	Netherlands	Peter Borren	Eden Gardens, Kolkata	Ireland by 6 wickets
ODI 3137	18 March	Sri Lanka	Kumar Sangakkara	New Zealand	Ross Taylor	Wankhede Stadium, Mumbai	Sri Lanka by 112 runs
ODI 3138	19 March	Bangladesh	Shakib Al Hasan	South Africa	Graeme Smith	Sher-e-Bangla National Cricket Stadium, Dhaka	South Africa by 206 runs
ODI 3139	19 March	Australia	Shahid Afridi	Australia	Ricky Ponting	R. Premadasa Stadium, Colombo	Pakistan by 4 wickets
ODI 3140	20 March	Kenya	Steve Tikolo	Zimbabwe	Elton Chigumbura	Eden Gardens, Kolkata	Zimbabwe by 161 runs
ODI 3141	20 March	India	Mahendra Singh Dhoni	West Indies	Darren Sammy	M. A. Chidambaram Stadium, Chennai	India by 80 runs

==== Knockout ====
Knockout stage
No.	Date	Team 1	Captain 1	Team 2	Captain 2	Venue	Result
Quarterfinals
ODI 3142	23 March	Pakistan	Shahid Afridi	West Indies	Darren Sammy	Sher-e-Bangla National Cricket Stadium, Dhaka	Pakistan by 10 wickets
ODI 3143	24 March	Australia	Ricky Ponting	India	Mahendra Singh Dhoni	Sardar Patel Stadium, Ahmedabad	India by 5 wickets
ODI 3144	25 March	New Zealand	Daniel Vettori	South Africa	Graeme Smith	Sher-e-Bangla National Cricket Stadium, Dhaka	New Zealand by 49 runs
ODI 3145	26 March	Sri Lanka	Kumar Sangakkara	England	Andrew Strauss	R. Premadasa Stadium, Colombo	Sri Lanka by 10 wickets
Semifinals
ODI 3146	29 March	New Zealand	Daniel Vettori	Sri Lanka	Kumar Sangakkara	R. Premadasa Stadium, Colombo	Sri Lanka by 5 wickets
ODI 3147	30 March	Pakistan	Shahid Afridi	India	Mahendra Singh Dhoni	Punjab Cricket Association IS Bindra Stadium, Mohali	India by 29 runs
Final
ODI 3148	2 April	India	Mahendra Singh Dhoni	Sri Lanka	Kumar Sangakkara	Wankhede Stadium, Mumbai	India by 6 wickets
