= Rajeev Kakar =

India banker

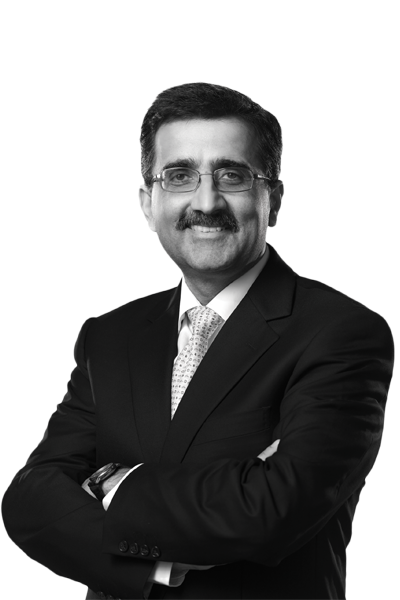
- Born: Delhi
- Education: Master of Business Administration and Bachelor of Technology (B.Tech, Mechanical Engineering)
- Alma mater: IIM Ahmedabad; IIT Delhi; St. Columba's School
- Occupation: Banker
- Organization(s): Eurobank Ergasias SA (2018 - Present) Gulf International Bank (2018 - Present) Fullerton Financial Holdings (2006-2017); Dunia Finance LLC (2006-2018); Citibank N.A. (1987-2006)

Rajeev Kakar is an Indian banker, serial business founder and entrepreneur. He currently serves as an Independent Non-Executive Director at Commercial International Bank, Egypt; Gulf International Bank, Bahrain and KSA; Eurobank Ergasias SA, Greece and Satin Creditcare Network, India (where he is a nominee of the Asian Development Bank, Manila). He also serves, since 2009, as a member of the Global Advisory Board of the prestigious University of Chicago, Booth School of Business, and also as a Member of the Industry Advisory Board of the SP Jain School of Global Management since 2011. As a board member at Eurobank, Rajeev also serves as the chairman of the Board Remuneration Committee and Vice Chairman of the Board Risk Committee.

With over three decades of experience in the banking industry, Rajeev has worked and lived as both a Fullerton Financial Holdings and Citibank international expatriate officer in several global markets, especially in the high-growth, emerging CEEMEA and ASIA-PACIFIC countries, based out of India, Egypt, Turkey, UAE and Singapore. In these roles, Rajeev has operated large banks and financial institutions, successfully realigned banking businesses, executed multi-country business strategies, led acquisitions and transformations, and has been a founder of multiple green-field financial services businesses and institutions. He continues to also actively serve on several prominent boards.

== Professional life ==
In recent years, between January 2006 and August 2018, Rajeev was one of the five Global Management Founders and a Founder Global Management Board Member of Fullerton Financial Holdings (Fullerton), a 100% subsidiary of Temasek Holdings, both headquartered in Singapore. In this global Fullerton role, he served as the Executive Vice-president and Regional CEO for the CEEMEA region for the Global Fullerton group, and concurrently also headed Fullerton's Consumer Banking businesses globally. In 2008, Kakar also simultaneously founded Dunia Finance in the UAE, a strategic joint venture financial institution between Fullerton Financial Holdings and Mubadala Investment Company, and served as its Founder Managing Director & CEO until July 2018. Prior to his role at Fullerton, between 1987 - 2006, Kakar worked at Citibank in various senior roles for almost two decades across several different countries between 1987 and 2006. In his last Citibank role, Kakar served as the Regional CEO & Division Executive for Citi's then fast growing Turkey, Middle East & Africa (TMEA) region, until January 2006.

Between September 2003 and January 2006, he was the Regional Head & CEO for Citibank, managing Citi's Turkey, Middle East and Africa region (TMEA) region, based out of Dubai, UAE. Earlier, between 2002 - 2003, Rajeev was Citibank's CEO for the Turkey & Egypt cluster, based out of Istanbul, and led an important strategic business turnaround for Citibank's business in Turkey. Prior to that, in 2000, he was the CEO for Citibank in Egypt, based out of Cairo, where he launched Citibank's consumer bank, which was the first full function Consumer Banking offering in the Egyptian market. This was recognized for fastest break-even in Citigroup's history.

Between 1996 - 2000, in India, Rajeev was the Business CEO for Citibank's Auto Finance business and, in this role based out of New Delhi, he also founded Citicorp Maruti Finance Limited, a new green-field joint venture captive finance company between Citigroup & the Car manufacturer Suzuki (Maruti) as strategic investors. He additionally ran this Non Bank Finance Company as the Founder Managing Director and CEO, till 2000, acquiring the highest share of the market at that time. Prior to this role, between 1993 and 1996, based first out of Mumbai and then Chennai, Rajeev was the marketing director for Citibank India for both its domestic businesses as well as Citibank India's Non-Resident Indian Banking Business operating across the world out of over 20 centers, covering NRI customers in 145 countries. Between 1987 and 1993, Rajeev held various other senior roles at Citibank in India.

== Honors and awards ==
- Forbes Middle East's Top Indian Leader in the UAE 2015
- Forbes Middle East's Top Indian Leader in the UAE 2014
- Forbes Middle East's Top CEOs in the Arab World 2014
- Forbes Middle East's Top Indian Leader in the UAE 2013
- Arabian Business' GCC Power List India Top 100 2013
- ITP Publishing Group's ITP Masala! Awards 2013, "CEO of the Year" Award
- Arabian Business' GCC Power List India Top 100 2012
- Arabian Business' GCC Power List India Top 100 2011
- Arabian Business' GCC Power List India Top 100 2010
- ITP Publishing Group's ITP CEO of the Year for Financial Services Middle East 2009.

== Education ==
Kakar completed a Masters of Business Administration (MBA) in Finance and Marketing from the Indian Institute of Management Ahmedabad. He also received his Bachelor of Technology in Mechanical Engineering from the Indian Institute of Technology Delhi.

Kakar was born and raised in Delhi, India, where he attended St. Columba's School, Delhi from 1970 to 1980.

== Board Positions and Affiliations ==
- Gulf International Bank, Bahrain, Independent Non-Executive Director (2018–present), Member of Board Executive Committee, Board Risk committee & Board Audit Committee
- Gulf International Bank, Kingdom of Saudi Arabia, Independent Non-Executive Director (2019–present), Member of Board Executive Committee & Board Risk Committee
- Commercial International Bank, Egypt, Independent Non - Executive Director (2019–present), Member of Board Risk Committee and Board Operations and Technology Committee
- Eurobank Ergasias SA, Greece, Independent Non-Executive Director, Chairman -Remuneration Committee, Vice Chairman Risk Committee (2018–present)
- Asian Development Bank, Nominee on the Board of Satin Credit Care (2019–present)
- Fullerton Financial Holdings (FFH), Singapore - Member of the Global Management Board (2006 – 2017)
- Dunia Finance, UAE - Founder Managing Director & CEO, Member of Board Risk Committee and Rem & Nom Committee (2008 – 2018)
- Dunia Services, UAE - Founder Managing Director & CEO on the Board (2012 – 2018)
- Fullerton India Credit Corporation, India - Member of Board, Board Risk Committee and Audit Committee (2009 – 2017)
- University of Chicago Booth School of Business - Member of the Global Advisory Board (2009 – present)
- Association of Executive Search Consultants (AESC), USA - Member of Global Advisory Board (2012 – 2016)
- S P Jain School of Global Management, UAE – Member of the Industry Advisory Board (2011 – present)
- Indian Institutes of Management (PAN IIM Board), GCC - Member of the Board (2011 – present)
- Great Lakes Institute of Management – Member of Business Advisory Council (2012 – present)
- Visa International - Member on the CEMEA Board (2004 - 2006)
- Mekong Development Bank, Vietnam - Member of Steering Committee (2010 - 2014)
- Adira Dinamika Multi Finance Tbk, Indonesia (subsidiary of Bank Danamon) - Member of Board of Commissioners; Member of Board Risk and Board Audit Committees (2010 - 2013)
- Citibank A. Ş, Turkey - Founding Board Member (2003 - 2004)
- Özel Sektör Gönüllüleri Derneği Yönetim Kurulu, Turkey - Board President (2002–2004)
- Citicorp Maruti Finance Ltd., India - Founder Managing Director & CEO (1997–2000)

== Personal life ==
Based in Dubai, Rajeev is married to Nidhi, with whom he has two daughters.
