= St. Columba's School, Delhi =

St. Columba's School
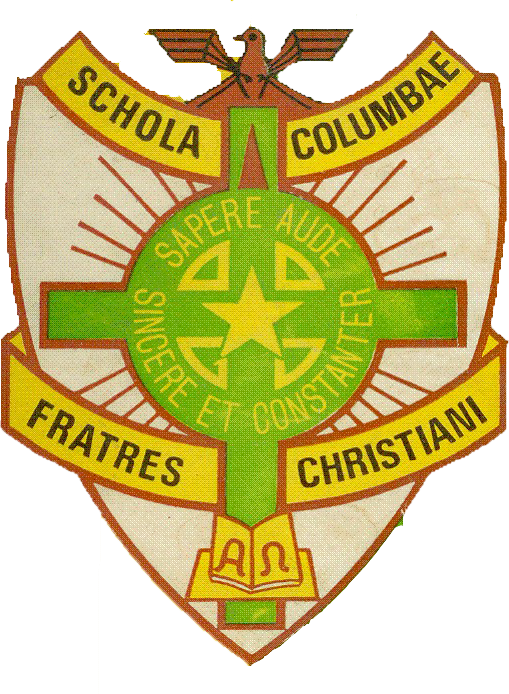
- Coat of arms of St. Columba's School

Location
- 1 Ashok Place; New Delhi 110001; India; 28.629826°N 77.205954°E

Information
- Type: Private
- Motto: Latin: Sapere aude sincere et constanter (Dare to be wise, sincere and constant)
- Religious affiliation: Catholic Church
- Established: 1941; 85 years ago
- Founder: Edmund Ignatius Rice
- Principal: Br. Robert Fernandes
- Faculty: 100+
- Grades: K-12
- Gender: Boys
- Enrollment: 2850
- Campus type: Urban
- Colors: Green; Gold
- Publication: The Columban
- Affiliation: Central Board of Secondary Education
- Former pupils: Old Columbans
- Website: stcolumbas.edu.in

St. Columba's School is a private boys' day school in New Delhi, India, established in 1941 by the Indian Province of the Congregation of Christian Brothers. The school is a constituent of a network of Christian Brother institutions founded by Edmund Ignatius Rice. Over 3,000 students are enrolled at St Columba's, spread between the junior, middle, and senior wings. The campus is located in the heart of Lutyens' Delhi and spans several acres. Alumni of St. Columba’s School include three Rhodes Scholars, a Pulitzer Prize winner, and a Forbes 30 Under 30 honoree, along with many others who have achieved distinction in fields such as politics, academia, business, and the arts. Students are referred to as Columbans.

== History ==
St. Columba's was founded in 1941 by the Congregation of Christian Brothers and contracted by Sir Sobha Singh. St. Columba's School, New Delhi, is one of the 19 Christian Brothers Schools in India. It began with 32 boys in New Delhi next to the Sacred Heart Cathedral, admitting through class 6. It was one of the first schools in India to introduce computer education. The junior school opened in 1942, at the site of what previously had been a rose garden.

== Notable alumni ==
=== Academics and sciences ===
- Deepak Chopra, 1963, physician, public speaker, writer and New Age spiritual guru
- Sanjiv Chopra, 1964, physician, Professor of Medicine and former Faculty Dean for Continuing Medical Education at Harvard Medical School
- Rajeev Motwani, Gödel Prize winner, former Professor of Computer Science at Stanford University
- Randeep Guleria, 1975, surgeon, Padma Shri awardee
- Siddhartha Mukherjee, Rhodes Scholar, Padma Shri, Pulitzer Prize winning author of The Emperor of All Maladies: A Biography of Cancer; Assistant Professor of Medicine at Columbia University
- Nitin Nohria, 1980, 10th and former dean of Harvard Business School, where he was named the Richard P. Chapman Professor of Business Administration
- Pradipta Banerji, Professor and Director IIT Roorkee
- Mahesh Rangarajan, Rhodes Scholar and Professor of History at Krea University
- Suhas Pandurang Sukhatme, 1952, Padma Shri, Director of IIT Bombay, Chairman of Atomic Energy Regulatory Board
- C V Seshadri, Professor and Dean IIT Kanpur
- Pradeep Dubey, game theorist, Professor of Economics at SUNY, Stony Brook
- Vijay Balasubramanian, theoretical physicist, Professor of Physics and Neuroscience at the University of Pennsylvania
- Prashant Pillai, Professor of Cyber Security and Associate Dean for Research and Knowledge Enterprise at University of Wolverhampton

=== Arts and entertainment ===
- Shah Rukh Khan, 1985, Padma Shri, Ordre des Arts et des Lettres, Legion d'honneur, Indian actor
- Ritvik Arora, 2015, actor
- George Chakravarthi, artist
- Mukul Dev, actor
- Rahul Dev, model and actor
- Vinil Mathew, ad-filmmaker and Bollywood director
- Gaurav Chopra, actor
- Arjun Mathur, actor
- Kunal Nayyar, actor; best known for his role as Raj Koothrappali on the American sitcom The Big Bang Theory
- Sanam Puri, Bollywood singer and independent artist
- Cyrus Sahukar, 1998, VJ and actor
- Gaurav Kapur, actor, commentator
- Palash Sen, singer (Euphoria)
- Sudeep Sen, author/poet
- Keith Sequeira, actor and model
- Samir Kochhar, actor and television presenter known for being the host of the Indian Premier League
- Amit Khanna, film executive, filmmaker, lyricist, winner of National Film Award for Best Lyrics in 1995
- Vibhav Roy, actor, model
- Tarun Jain, writer, actor
- Ali Kazimi, filmmaker and writer

=== Politics ===
- Rahul Gandhi, politician, Leader of the Opposition in Lok Sabha, son of former Prime Minister Rajiv Gandhi & Sonia Gandhi
- Sanjay Gandhi, Indian National Congress politician; son of Prime Minister Indira Gandhi
- Gaurav Gogoi, Member of Parliament
- Derek O'Brien, Indian television personality and Member of Parliament
- Anil Shastri, politician, former member of Lok Sabha representing the Indian National Congress.
- Jayant Sinha, Minister of State, Finance, Government of India; Member of Parliament
- Abhishek Manu Singhvi, 1975, politician, spokesperson for the Indian National Congress
- Adarsh Shastri, politician belonging to the Aam Aadmi Party
- Suneet Chopra, politician, trade unionist, belonging to the Communist Party of India (Marxist)
- Conrad Sangma, Chief Minister of the State of Meghalaya
- Sidharth Nath Singh, Minister of Health, Government of Uttar Pradesh

=== Civil servants ===
- Ajit Seth, 30th Cabinet Secretary of India
- Najeeb Jung, Lieutenant Governor of Delhi, ex-vice chancellor of Jamia Millia Islamia
- Vijay Keshav Gokhale, 32nd Foreign Secretary of India
- Rahul Bhatnagar, Chief Secretary of Uttar Pradesh
- Gopalaswami Parthasarathy, Indian High Commissioner to Pakistan during the Kargil War
- Deepak Vohra, India's Ambassador to Armenia
- Manjeev Singh Puri, India's Ambassador to Brussels and Nepal

=== Law ===
- Badar Durrez Ahmed, Chief Justice High Court of Jammu and Kashmir
- Justice Dhananjaya Y. Chandrachud, Chief Justice of India
- Justice B. P. Singh, Justice of Supreme Court of India

=== Business ===
- Ivan Menezes, 1975, CEO of Diageo
- Suresh Kumar, Director-General U.S. Foreign Commercial Service
- Romesh Wadhwani, 1962, Padma Shri, Founder of Symphony Technology Group
- Sanjeev Bikhchandani, 1981, Padma Shri, Founder and CEO of Naukri.com
- Piyush Gupta, 1976, CEO and Director of DBS Bank
- Ajay Singh, 1984, founder and Chairman, SpiceJet
- Asim Ghosh, 1963, former CEO of Husky Energy, an integrated Canadian oil and gas company and former CEO of Vodafone Essar.
- Victor Menezes, Senior Vice Chairman, Citigroup
- Lalit Modi, businessman, cricket administrator
- Lalit Suri, hotelier and Rajya Sabha Member of Parliament
- Neeraj Kanwar, Vice Chairman and Managing Director of Apollo Tyres
- Patu Keswani, Chairman and Managing Director of Lemon Tree Hotels
- Sumant Sinha, Chairman and Managing Director of ReNew Power
- Deep Kalra, 1987, Founder and CEO of MakeMyTrip
- Sandeep Jajodia, Chairman and Managing Director of Monnet Ispat and Energy
- Vivek Paul, former Vice Chairman and CEO, Wipro
- Rajeev Kakar, 1980, Executive Vice President, Fullerton Financial Holdings
- Sandeep P Parekh, financial lawyer, former Executive Director of SEBI, WEF Young Global Leader
- Anant Agarwal, 2010, Promoter and Vice Chairman of McDonald’s India North & East, CPRL and Coca Cola India North & East, Moon Beverages

=== Military ===
- Rana Chhina, IAF, recipient of the MacGregor Medal and military historian
- Lt Arun Khetarpal, Poona Horse, recipient of the Param Vir Chakra
- Lt Gen DS Hooda, former Northern Army commander, and principal architect of the 2016 Indian Line of Control strike

=== Sports ===
- Ashish Bagai, former captain, and keeper-batsman of the Canadian cricket team
- Arun Lal, cricketer and commentator
- Mansher Singh, 1985, sport shooter, Olympic athlete
- Novy Kapadia, Indian football journalist, critic and commentator often considered to be India's foremost football expert and commentator

== See also ==
- List of Christian Brothers schools in India
- List of Christian Schools in India
