= Jajodia =

Jajodia is an Indian surname/Nepali surname. Notable people with the surname include:

- Dilip Jajodia (born 1944), Indian businessman
- Sandeep Jajodia (born 1966), an Indian industrialist
- Sushil Jajodia, American academic
- Aditya Jajodia, Indian businessman
