= Pradipta =

Name list

Pradipta is the surname or given name of the following people

== Surname ==
- Rizki Amelia Pradipta (born in 1990), Indonesian badminton player

== First name ==
- Pradipta Banerji, Indian professor and director
- Pradipta Kumar Naik (born in 1966), Indian politician
- Pradipta Pramanik (born in 1998), Indian cricket player
