= Prashant Pillai (computer scientist) =

Leading researcher in cyber security

Prashant Pillai FBCS, FHEA, MIET, SMIEEE
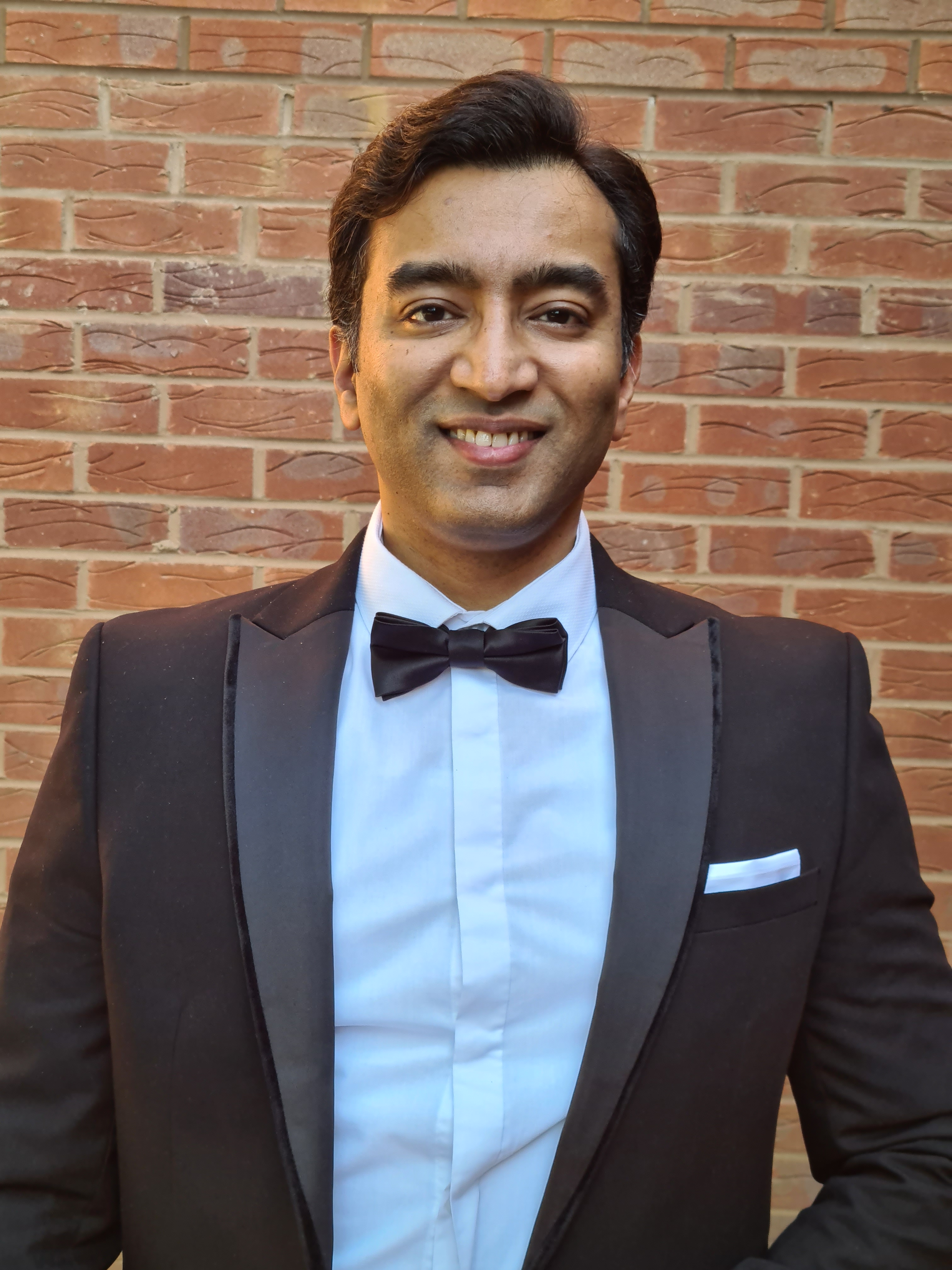
- Born: July 1979 (age 47); New Delhi, India
- Education: University of Delhi, University of Bradford
- Occupation: Computer scientist

Prashant Pillai MBE (born July 1979) is an Indian-born British computer scientist. He is the Pro Vice-Chancellor for Research and Knowledge Exchange at the University of Wolverhampton, UK. He was previously the Associate Dean for Research and Knowledge Exchange and Professor of Cyber Security at the University of Wolverhampton. He is also the Director of Cyber Quarter - Midlands Centre for Cyber Security. He specialises in security and privacy for communication networks. Pillai has led several national/international research projects in the areas of networking protocols and cyber security. He has been invited for talks at various international conferences and has published over 100 papers within peer-reviewed journals and conferences.

He is a Fellow of British Computer Society (FBCS), Fellow of the Higher Education Academy (FHEA), Senior Member of the Institute of Electrical and Electronics Engineers (SMIEEE) and Member of the Institution of Engineering and Technology (MIET).

== Early life and education ==
Pillai was born in New Delhi, India and attended St. Columba's School in Delhi. He earned a BSc (Hons) in Electronics from the University of Delhi and an MSc in Informatics also from the University of Delhi. He received his Ph.D. from University of Bradford, UK for his thesis titled Authentication, Authorization and Accounting framework for multicast communication in highly mobile wireless networks.

== Career ==
Pillai started his academic career at University of Bradford, UK where he moved from Lecturer to Senior Lecturer and held administrative positions like Director of Postgraduate Research and Deputy Head of Electrical Engineering. He led the two-year project named SITARA: Smart Grid to harness Satellite based Virtual Power Plants for energy sustainability, which was funded by the British Council under the Global Innovation Initiative scheme.

He then moved to Oxford Brookes University in 2017, as a Reader in Cyber Security and Head of the Cyber Security Research Group at the Faculty of Technology, Design and Environment.

Pillai joined the University of Wolverhampton, UK as Professor of Cyber Security and Director of the Wolverhampton Cyber Research Institute in 2018. He was interim Head of School for the School of Mathematics and Computer Science before taking on his current role as Associate Dean of Research and Knowledge Exchange at the same University. He is also the Centre Director for £9m Cyber Quarter - the Midlands Centre for Cyber Security. It is a joint venture between the University of Wolverhampton and Herefordshire Council and part-funded by the Government’s Local Growth Fund, via the Marches Local Enterprise Partnership (LEP) and the European Regional Development Fund (ERDF). The Cyber Quarter was opened in December 2021.

He has been a Co-founder and Director of several start-ups like Cydon, OnlynShield and CyberMind.

He has published over 100 papers in leading international journals and conferences and has a patent on Distributed Ledger Technology.

== Honours, recognition and awards ==
Pillai is the current Chair of the Cybersecurity Working Group of the Innovation Alliance for the West Midlands.

He was also appointed as the Group Chair of the IEEE UK and Ireland Blockchain group in 2022.

He was Co-chair of the Satellite Working Group of the IEEE International Network Generations Roadmap (INGR) from 2018-2021. and is an Advisory Board Member of the West Midlands Cyber Resilience Centre.

Pillai was selected as one of ‘75 at 75’ Achievers in the India UK Achievers Honours 2023.

Pillai was appointed Member of the Order of the British Empire (MBE) in the 2023 New Year Honours for services to cyber security and education.
