= Sandeep P Parekh =

Sandeep Parekh, born 1971, is an Indian financial sector lawyer who founded Finsec Law Advisors, Mumbai. He attended St. Columba's School in New Delhi, India. He then attended Hindu College at Delhi University, which gave him a distinguished alumni award in 2008. 10. He then obtained a degree in law from Delhi University Law Centre II, which also recognised him as a distinguished alumni in 2007. He was profiled in 2006 by CNBC in its program 'Young Turks' by Shereen Bhan as a young leader.

He worked as an executive director at the Securities and Exchange Board of India, (SEBI), India’s securities regulator, where he headed the Enforcement department and was the General Counsel. He has been the youngest person to hold the post at the regulator. Previously, he had worked in law firm Wilmer, Cutler & Pickering, in Washington, D.C. He holds an LL.M. (Securities & Finance Regulation) degree from Georgetown University. He was a faculty member of the Indian Institute of Management Ahmedabad, India's premier management school, and is currently a visiting faculty member there (since 2002).

Sandeep is a member of Mensa, and the Triple Nine Society has published op-eds in the Financial Times and is a columnist at the Economic Times. He is a member of the New York Bar and the US Supreme Court Bar. While teaching at IIM, Ahmedabad, he acted as an expert witness for the plaintiffs in a New York federal court regarding Satyam Computers scam, one of India’s biggest financial scams. Satyam was listed both in India and in the US and US investors brought a class action lawsuit for damages against Satyam and its directors and auditors.

Parekh was a member of the Cabinet Secretariat task force for measuring performance in ministries and departments of the Government of India. He is a former chairman and member of Securities and Exchange Board of India Committees and Sub-committees. He was appointed Chairman of the SEBI Working Group on Proxy Advisors in December 2018 and is a serving member of the SEBI Committee on Mutual Funds and SEBI sub-committee on regulatory sandbox. In the past he has been invited to SEBI Committee on Disclosures and Accounting Standards. He was made chairman of the sub-committee on Integrated Disclosure which gave its report on Jan 28, 2008. He was also invited to join the SEBI Committee to study the future of Regional Stock Exchanges - Post Demutualisation created by the securities regulator.

He is a World Economic Forum "Young Global Leader". He is also a Salzburg Global Fellow and founding curator of the Mumbai Chapter of the Global Shaper's community of the World Economic Forum. He has also been recognized for exceptional standing in law by AsiaLaw Profiles, leading financial lawyer by IFLR1000 leading financial lawyer (Legal 500), leading capital markets lawyer by Chambers and Partners and listed as Who's Who of the world (Marquis). The firm he heads, [Finsec Law Advisor], has been ranked the highest rated law firm in India for Financial Regulatory Practice by [Asialaw.com]. He has been profiled by the Economic Times in its article GenNext lawyers break away from large firms to take start-up route, banking on niche expertise.

He is the author of Fraud, Manipulation and Insider Trading in the Indian Securities Markets, now in its fourth edition.

He is an independent director on the board of largest private sector bank HDFC Bank Limited and third largest company by market capitalisation in India.
