= Gulf International Bank =

Bahrain bank

Gulf International Bank B.S.C. (GIB)

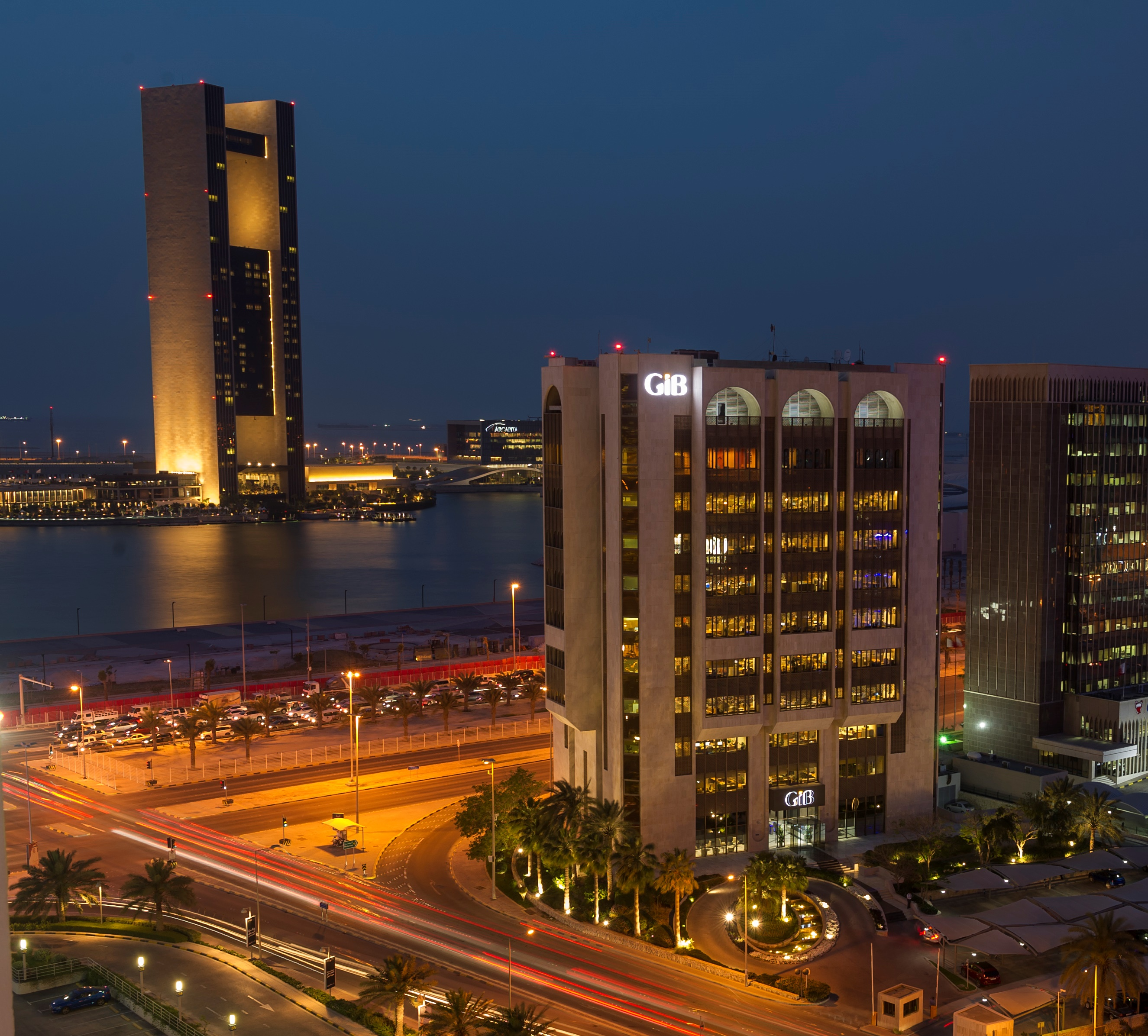
- GIB headquarters in Manama, Bahrain
- Native name: بنك الخليج الدولي
- Industry: Banking
- Founded: 1975; 51 years ago
- Headquarters: Manama, Bahrain
- Key people: (Chairman)
- Products: International Wholesale; Commercial Banking; Universal Banking; Corporate Finance; Islamic Banking; Treasury; Asset Management; Retail Banking
- Revenue: ▲US$ 1,414.5 Million (H1-2024)
- Net income: ▲US$ 106.3 Million (H1-2024)
- Total assets: ▲US$ 45.704 Billion (QII-2024)
- Website: www.gib.com

Gulf International Bank (GIB) (Arabic: بنك الخليج الدولي) is a bank established in 1976. It is licensed by the Central Bank of Bahrain and headquartered in Manama in Bahrain.

== Board of directors ==
- Dr. Abdullah bin Hassan Alabdulgader – Chairman of the board
- Abdulla bin Mohammed Al Zamil – Vice Chairman
- Abdulaziz bin Abdulrahman Al-Helaissi – Director, Group Chief Executive Officer,

Gulf International Bank Chairman, Gulf International Bank (UK) Limited

- Sultan bin Abdul Malek Al-Sheikh – Director
- Bander bin Abdulrahman bin Mogren — Director
- Dr. Najem bin Abdulla Al Zaid — Director
- Rajeev Kakar — Director
- Frank Schwab — Director
