= Satin Creditcare Network Limited =

Non-banking finance company

- Type: NBFC
- Traded as: BSE: 539404; NSE: SATIN
- ISIN: INE180K01011
- Industry: Finance
- Founded: 1998
- Headquarters: Gurugram, India
- Area served: India
- Key people: H P Singh
- Website: www.satincreditcare.com

Satin Creditcare Network Limited is a non-banking finance company (NBFC), licensed by the Reserve Bank of India. It was founded in 1990 by Mr. H P Singh. The company's offers financial requirements for excluded households at the bottom of the pyramid. Satin Creditcare Network Limited is a micro-finance institution (MFI) in the country with presence in seven states and more than 12,00 villages.

== History ==
The company launched its operations as a provider of individual and small business loans and savings services to urban lenders in 1990, going on to be registered as an NBFC with the RBI in 1998 and converting into an NBFC-MFI in November 2013. Founded by HP Singh who has over three decades of micro-finance experience.

In 2017, company incorporated a wholly owned Housing Finance subsidiary with the aim of providing financing in the affordable housing segment and leveraging rural outreach. In January 2019, company received separate NBFC license to commence MSME business "Satin Finserv Limited". SATIN forayed in digital lending "Loan Dost".

As of March 2019, SCNL had 1,168 branches and a headcount of 11,940 across 22 states and union territories serving 35 lakh clients. Satin Creditcare maintains a focus on rural and semi-urban areas.

== The 1 billion mark ==
SATIN reached the US$1-Billion Asset Under Management mark at the close of FY2018–19.

This differential is also manifest in its faster-than-industry growth in the last five years – they posted CAGR growth of 37.3% from FY15 to FY19, as against industry growth of 25.6%.

== Subsidiaries ==
=== Satin Housing Finance Limited ===
Incorporated on 17 April 2017, It was founded by Mr. Amit Sharma (CEO & MD - Satin Housing Finance Limited) as a wholly owned subsidiary company of Satin Creditcare Network Limited, Satin Housing Finance Limited has a registered office in New Delhi. Satin Housing Finance Limited provides long-term finance for the purchase, construction, extension and repair of houses for the retail segment, along with loans against a residential property, commercial property and plots.

=== TARAASHNA ===
Taraashna Financial Services Limited acts as a business correspondent for banks and NBFCs and provides similar services to other financial institutions in rural and semi-urban areas. Taraashna Financial Services Limited is enabled under its objects to carry out the business of, among other things, the promotion and nurturing of SBL, Cattle Finance, and JLG and providing them with capacity-building support, as well as linking them to banks and other financial institutions in order to avail different financial services.

=== Satin Finserv Limited ===
Satin Creditcare Network Limited forayed into the MSME segment with a focus on small business owners in manufacturing, trading and services. The company's MSME loan offerings to these customers account for the fact that many of these customers may not habitually maintain standard books of accounts, or that a vast majority of them may not even fall under the turnover bracket warranting financial auditing.
