= Sandeep Jajodia =

Indian industrialist (born 1966)

- Born: 14 March 1966 (age 60); Kolkata
- Education: University of Delhi
- Occupation: CMD of Monnet Group
- Spouse: Seema Jajodia

Sandeep Jajodia (born 14 March 1966) is an Indian industrialist. He is a chairman and managing director of Monnet Ispat & Energy. The 50-year-old son-in-law of the late industrialist OP Jindal now dreams of making Monnet a competitive player in the minerals, metal and power space. He was the President of ASSOCHAM (a leading national Chamber of Commerce in India), and was succeeded by Balkrishnan Goenka He was also the first President of Boxing India.

== Early life ==
Born in Kolkata, Sandeep went to St. Columba's School, Delhi and went on like many other boys from business families to complete a B.Com (Hons) degree from University of Delhi in 1988. By the age of 23, when the stainless steel sector in India was on the rise, he set up a Rs 1.7 crore ferro-alloy unit by taking a loan of 80 lakhs.

He married Seema, daughter of Om Prakash Jindal and sister of Naveen Jindal.
