= Vidarbha Cricket Association Stadium =

International cricket stadium in Nagpur, Maharashtra, India

Coordinates: 21°00′48.86″N 79°02′22.57″E

- New VCA Stadium
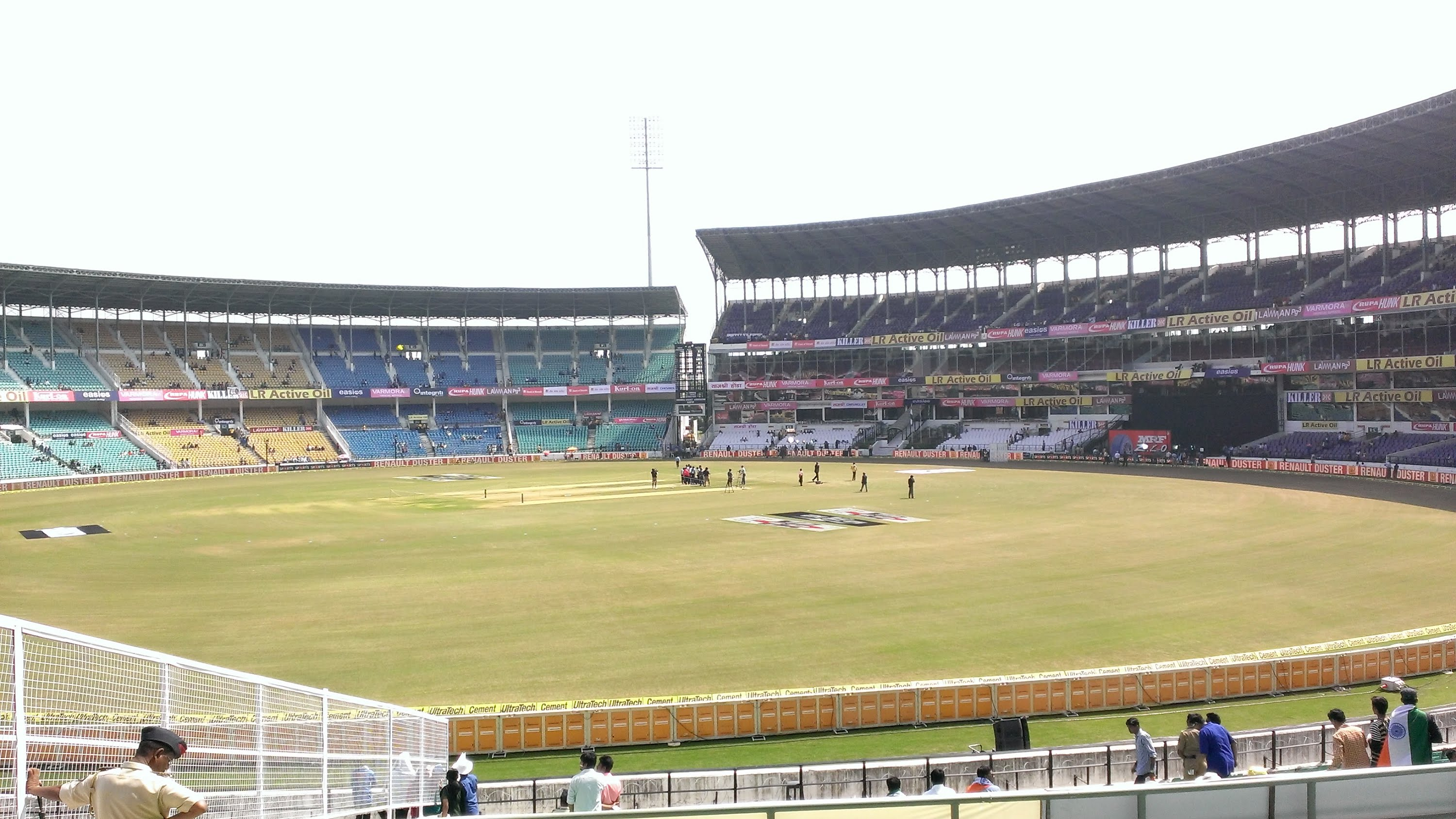
- Interactive map of Vidarbha Cricket Association Stadium

Ground information
- Location: Nagpur, Maharashtra
- Country: India
- Establishment: 2008
- Capacity: 45,000
- Owner: Vidarbha Cricket Association
- Architect: Shashi Prabhu
- Operator: Vidarbha Cricket Association
- Tenants: Vidarbha cricket team, Deccan Chargers
- End names
- Secretary End; Pavilion End

International information
- First men's Test: 6–10 November 2008: India v Australia
- Last men's Test: 9–11 February 2023: India v Australia
- First men's ODI: 28 October 2009: India v Australia
- Last men's ODI: 6 February 2025: India v England
- First men's T20I: 9 December 2009: India v Sri Lanka
- Last men's T20I: 21 January 2026: India v New Zealand
- First women's ODI: 6 April 2016: India v England
- Last women's ODI: 12 April 2016: India v England
- First women's T20I: 18 March 2016: Australia v South Africa
- Last women's T20I: 21 March 2016: Australia v New Zealand
- As of 11 February 2023; Source: Cricinfo

The New Vidarbha Cricket Association Stadium, also known as Jamtha Stadium, is a cricket stadium in Nagpur, Maharashtra, India. It is the second largest cricket stadium in India in terms of field area after the Shaheed Veer Narayan Singh International Cricket Stadium, and the qualities of the stadium have been praised by the International Cricket Council.

The stadium is located at Jamtha on the southern outskirts of Nagpur and was inaugurated in 2008, replacing the old Vidarbha Cricket Association Ground as the city's main stadium. The VCA Stadium has a capacity of 45,000 and is the home ground for the Vidarbha and Central Zone cricket teams for the domestic Ranji Trophy and Duleep Trophy tournaments respectively. As of January 2020 it has hosted more T20I matches (12) than any other stadium in India. As of 10 November 2019 it has hosted 6 Tests, 9 ODIs and 12 T20Is.

== England Tour of India 2025 ==
Vidarbha Cricket Association (VCA) is all set to host the 1st One Day International Match of "IDFC First Bank ODI Trophy" between India and England, scheduled to be played on 6 February 2025. VCA has made special arrangements with Orphanages for Orphan Children to witness the match. Free Transportation and Free Tickets for such orphan children have been arranged by VCA.

== Overview ==
Layout of the VCA Stadium

Sachin Tendulkar said "the facilities exceeded all expectations" and Ricky Ponting commented on the comfort in the changing rooms. Rajasthan Royals skipper Shane Warne was extremely pleased with the "largeness of the ground" after his team's two-run win over Deccan Chargers. "Michael Lumb's slog to deep mid-wicket found a fielder. Now, if this was Arun Jaitley Cricket Stadium or M. Chinnaswamy Stadium, then that ball would have landed in a taxi going to the team hotel. We need big grounds like these," Warne said. It has 80-yard straight boundaries and 85-yard square boundaries, which makes it one of the largest grounds (in terms of playing area) in the world.

Lalit Modi said the VCA was "by far the best stadium in India". The stadium has been praised not only by the players but also by commentators and journalists because of the facilities. Alan Wilkins said, "It is a fabulous stadium, a Colosseum here in Nagpur. It has the most impressive Press box for the travelling media. It really is a wonderful venue."

The first international match at this venue was the Fourth Test between India and Australia in November 2008, which India won by 172 runs. The Australian spinner Jason Krejza finished with 12 wickets, while Harbhajan Singh claimed seven for India.

Four matches were played at the stadium during the 2011 Cricket World Cup. The highest Test scores are by India: 566/8, 558/6 and 441. The leading run scorers in Tests are Virendar Sehwag (357), Virat Kohli (354) and MS Dhoni (339). The leading wicket takers in a Test are R Ashwin (23 wickets), Ishant Sharma (19) and Harbhajan Singh (13 wickets). The highest ODI scores are by India 354/7, India 351/4, Australia 350/6, New Zealand 302/7 and Sri Lanka 302/7. The leading scorers in ODIs are Virat Kohli (325), Mahendra Singh Dhoni (268) and Rohit Sharma (204). The leading wicket takers in ODIs are Mitchell Johnson (9 wickets), Ravindra Jadeja (6 wickets) and Dale Steyn (5) and Harbhajan Singh (5).

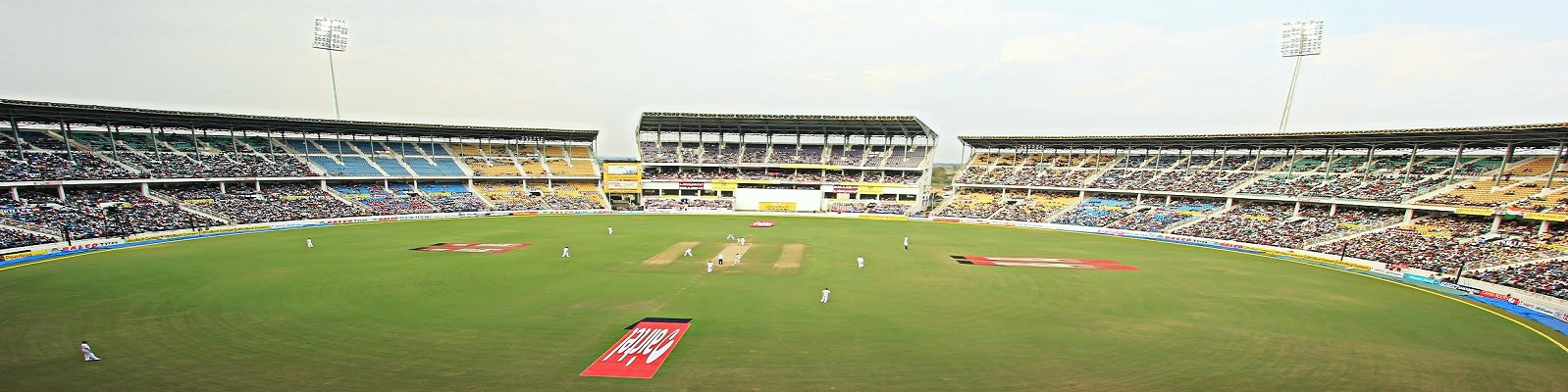
Panoramic view of VCA Stadium, Nagpur

== Various format record ==
=== Test records ===
- Highest team total: 610/6d, by India against Sri Lanka in 2017/18.
- Lowest team total: 79, by South Africa against India in 2015/16.
- Highest individual score: 253*, by Hashim Amla (South Africa) against India in 2010/11.
- Best bowling in an innings: 8/215, by Jason Krejza (Australia) against India in 2008/09.
- Most runs scored by a player: Virat Kohli 366.
- Most wickets taken: Ravichandran Ashwin 31.

=== ODI records ===
- Highest team total: 354/7, by India against Australia in 2009/10
- Lowest team total: 123, by Canada against Zimbabwe on 28 February 2011.
- Highest individual score: 156, by George Bailey against India in 2013/14.
- Most runs scored by a player: Virat Kohli- 325 runs, followed by MS Dhoni- 268 runs and Rohit Sharma- 206 runs.
- Best bowling in an innings: 4/33, by Mitchell Johnson against New Zealand in February 2011.
- Most wickets taken: Mitchell Johnson- 9 wickets and Ravindra Jadeja - 9 wickets.

=== T20I records ===
- Highest team total: 219/5, by Sri Lanka against India in 2009/10.
- Lowest team total: 79/10, by India against New Zealand in 2016/17.
- Highest individual score: 84, by Abhishek Sharma against New Zealand in 2026.
- Best bowling in an innings: 6/7 by Deepak Chahar against Bangladesh in 2019/20.

== List of five wicket hauls in international cricket ==
=== Tests ===
Five-wicket hauls in Men's Test matches at VCA Stadium
| No. | Bowler | Date | Team | Opposing Team | Inn | O | R | W | Result |
|---|---|---|---|---|---|---|---|---|---|
| 1 | Jason Krezja | 6 November 2008 | Australia | India | 1 | 43.5 | 215 | 8 | India won |
| 2 | Dale Steyn | 6 February 2010 | South Africa | India | 2 | 16.4 | 51 | 7 | South Africa won |
| 3 | Ravichandran Ashwin | 25 November 2015 | India | South Africa | 2 | 16.1 | 32 | 5 | India won |
| 4 | Imran Tahir | 25 November 2015 | South Africa | India | 3 | 11.3 | 38 | 5 | India won |
| 5 | Ravichandran Ashwin | 25 November 2015 | India | South Africa | 4 | 29.5 | 66 | 7 | India won |
| 6 | Ravindra Jadeja | 9 February 2023 | India | Australia | 1 | 22 | 47 | 5 | India won |
| 7 | Todd Murphy | 9 February 2023 | Australia | India | 2 | 47 | 124 | 7 | India won |
| 8 | Ravichandran Ashwin | 9 February 2023 | India | Australia | 3 | 12 | 37 | 5 | India won |

=== One Day Internationals ===
Five-wicket hauls in Men's ODI matches at VCA Stadium
| No. | Bowler | Date | Team | Opposing Team | Inn | O | R | W | Result |
|---|---|---|---|---|---|---|---|---|---|
| 1 | Dale Steyn | 12 March 2011 | South Africa | India | 1 | 9.3 | 50 | 5 | South Africa won |

=== Twenty20 Internationals ===
Five-wicket hauls in Men's T20I matches at VCA Stadium
| No. | Bowler | Date | Team | Opposing Team | Inn | O | R | W | Result |
|---|---|---|---|---|---|---|---|---|---|
| 1 | Deepak Chahar | 10 November 2019 | India | Bangladesh | 2 | 3.2 | 7 | 6 | India won |

== Gallery ==
Photo Gallery of the VCA Stadium

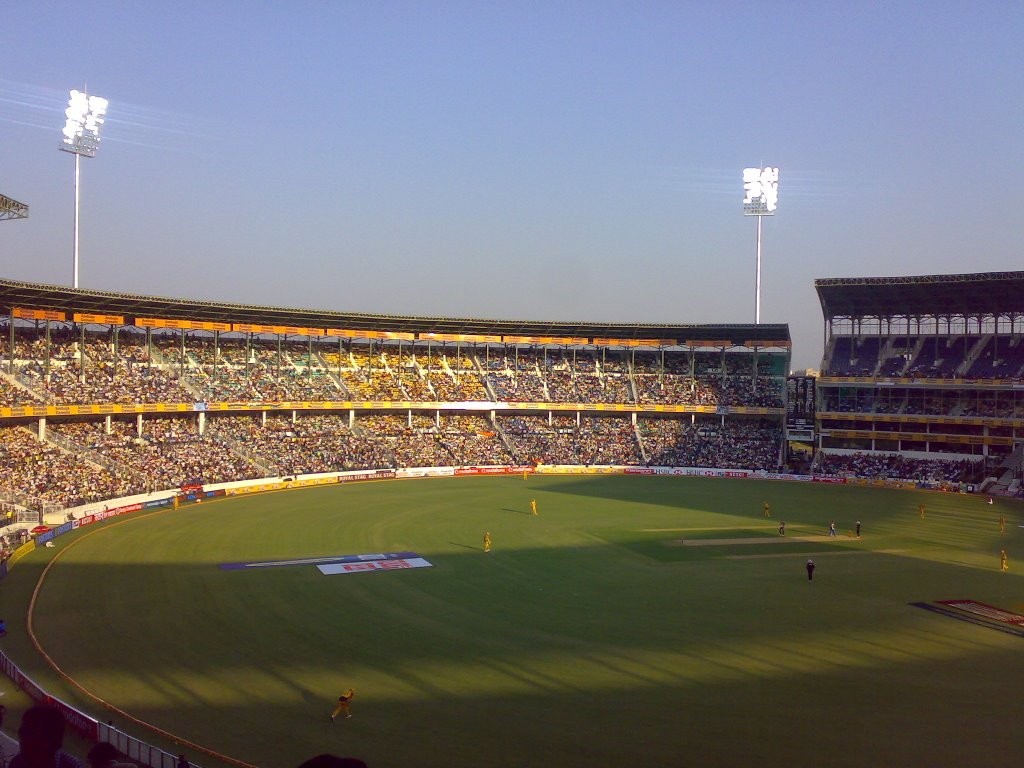
Ground view

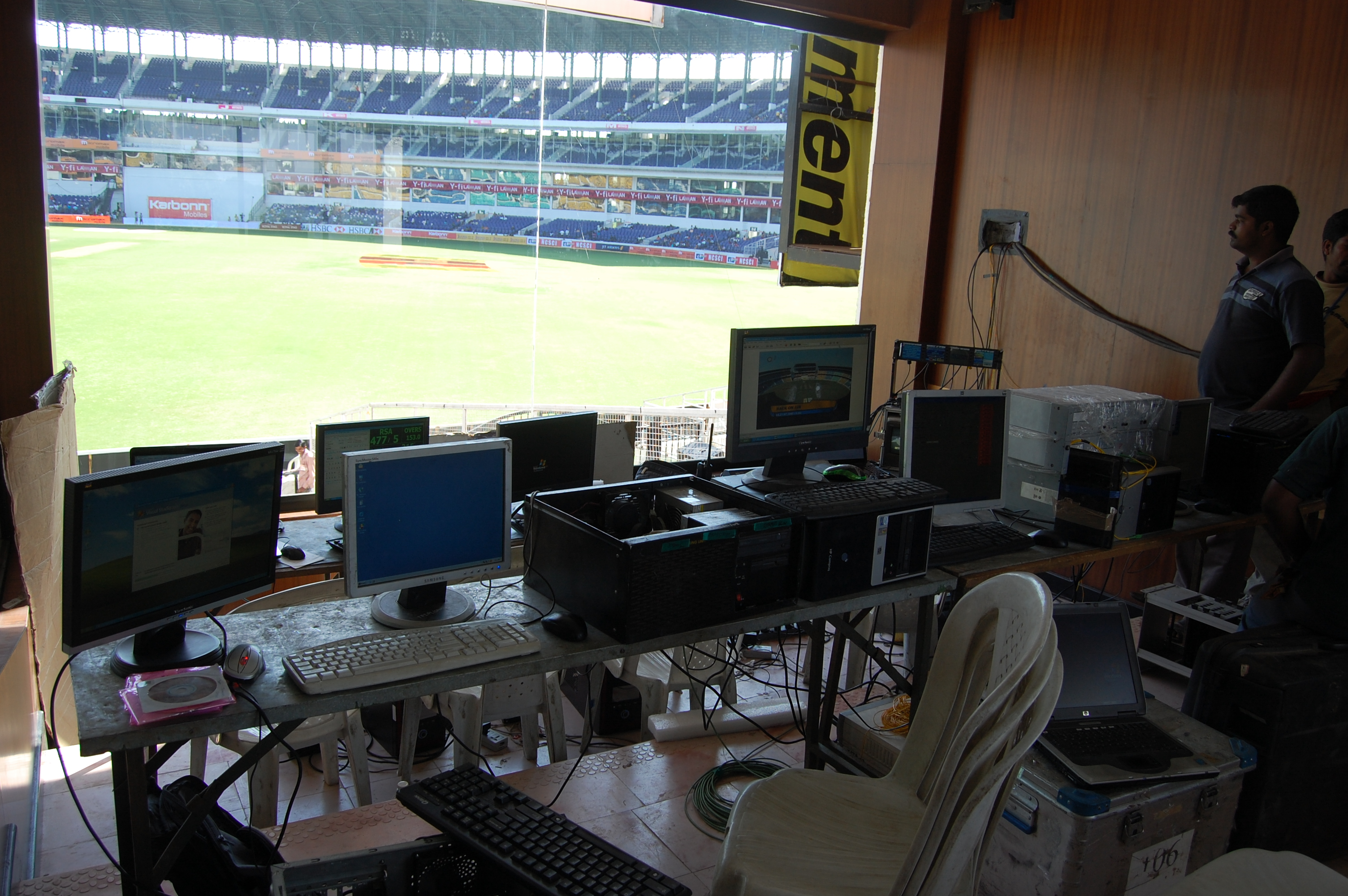
The on ground scorecard and big screen control room

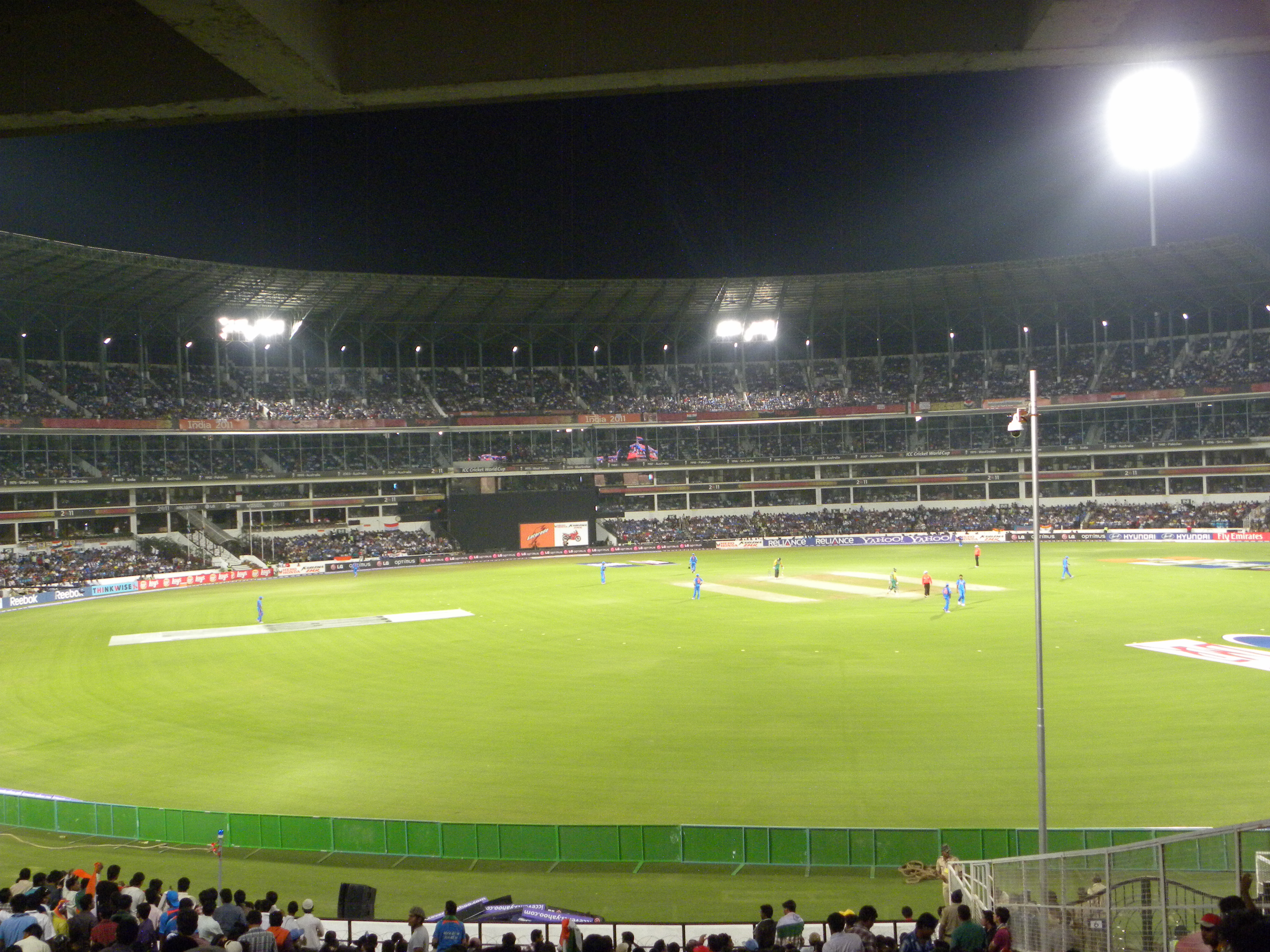
VCA at night

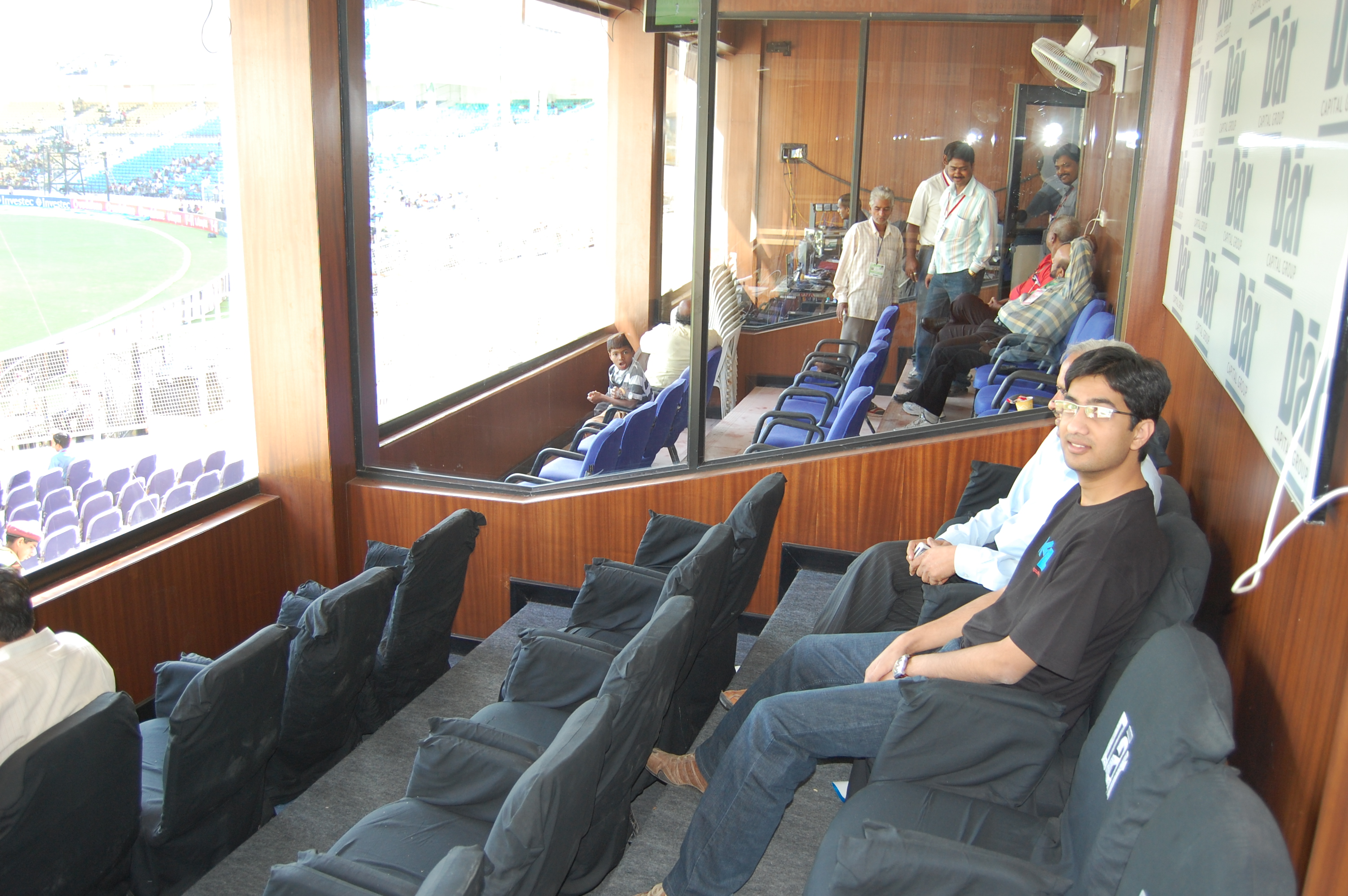
The corporate box in north wing

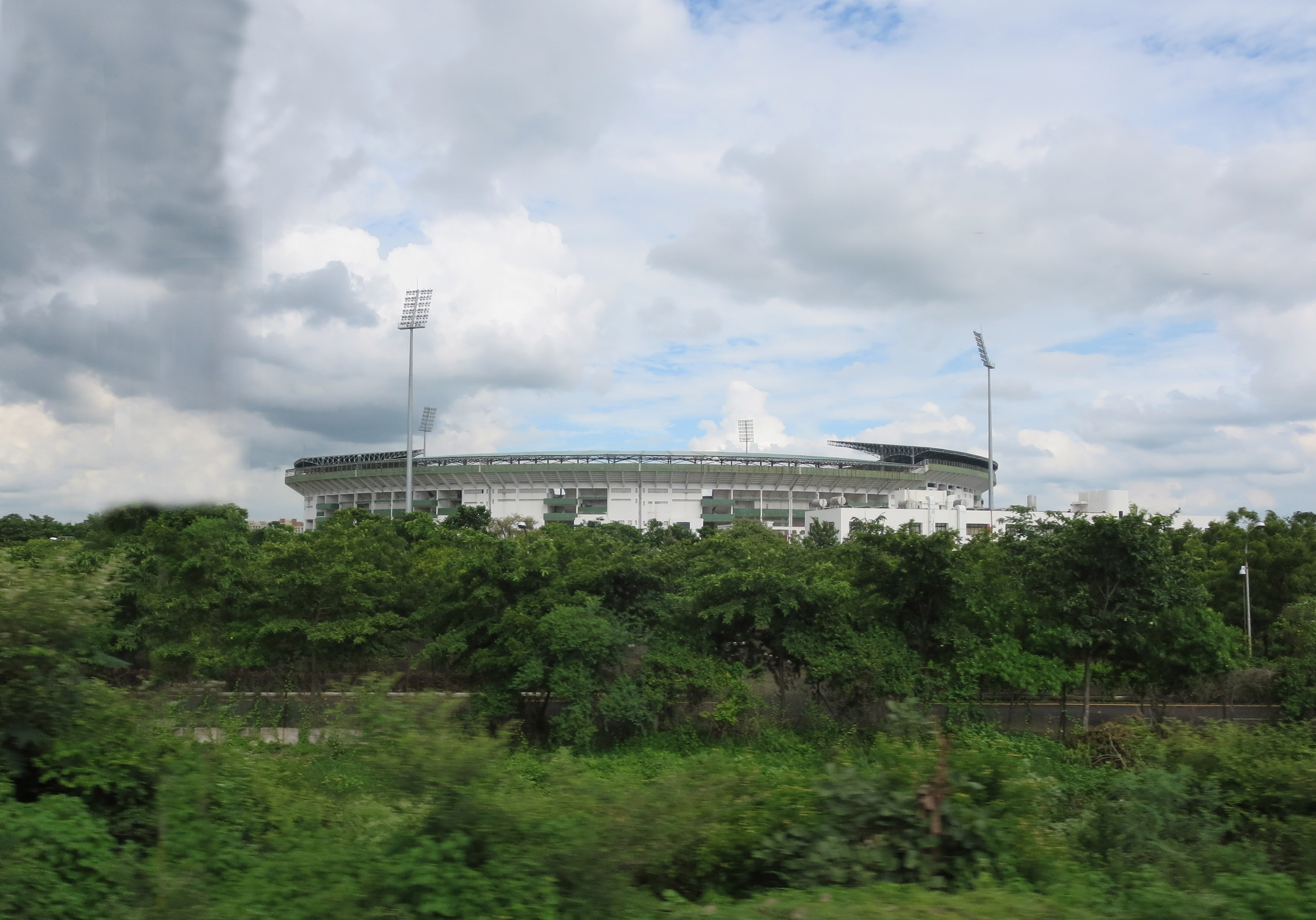
The stadium as seen from a train in Nagpur

== See also ==
- Vidarbha Cricket Association Ground
- List of Test cricket grounds
- List of stadiums by capacity
- List of cricket grounds by capacity
- List of cricket grounds in India
- List of stadiums in India
- List of international cricket grounds in India
- Lists of stadiums
