= Ashish Bagai =

Canadian cricketer

Personal information
- Born: 26 January 1982 (age 44); Delhi, India
- Batting: Right-handed
- Role: Wicketkeeper, batsman

International information
- National side: Canada (2003–2013)
- ODI debut (cap 14): 11 February 2003 v Bangladesh
- Last ODI: 13 March 2011 v Australia
- T20I debut (cap 1): 2 August 2008 v Netherlands
- Last T20I: 26 November 2013 v Kenya

Career statistics
Competition	ODI	T20I	FC	LA
Matches	62	9	15	96
Runs scored	1,964	284	825	2,649
Batting average	37.76	40.57	31.73	32.70
100s/50s	2/16	0/2	0/6	2/20
Top score	137*	67*	93	137*
Catches/stumpings	59/9	5/6	37/3	96/19
- Source: ESPNcricinfo, 16 July 2024

Ashish Bagai (born 26 January 1982) is an Indian-born former cricketer and captain of the Canada national cricket team. He was a right-handed batsman who specialised as a wicket-keeper.

== Early life ==
He studied at St. Columba's School during his brief stay in Delhi, India. He moved to Canada at the age of 11.

== Career ==
=== Early years ===
His first taste of cricket came in the inaugural Under-15s Cricket World Cup in 1996, in which he was voted the tournament's best wicket-keeper. He had the highest batting average in the Under-19s World Cup in January – February 2000. Going to the 2002 Under-19s World Cup, his batting was invaluable, securing a tie with Bangladesh.

He later became a face of the Canadian cricket team, for which he played 62 One Day Internationals, more than any other Canadian player. He made his ODI debut in the 2003 World Cup against Bangladesh.

Despite his permanent position in the Canadian ODI team, he missed the 2005 ICC Trophy, though he did play the 2001 tournament, the highlight of which was an innings that took the Canadians to victory over the UAE after spending a night in hospital due to being hit in the face when keeping.

He holds the Canadian record for highest ODI score after his unbeaten 137 in a losing cause against Scotland. In that same ODI he set a record in One Day International cricket for facing the most number of balls in an ODI innings when batting at number three position (172). He added 100 runs for 4th wicket with Asif Mulla which was the first ever century stand for Canada in an ODI.

=== 2011 World Cup ===
Bagai captained the Canadian team during the 2011 Cricket World Cup and made 64 not out against Kenya off 97 balls as Canada won their first match of the tournament. This was the second World Cup win Canada had registered. Against New Zealand in the following ODI he scored 84 off 87 balls and he shared a 100+ partnership with Jimmy Hansra. However Canada lost by 70 runs as New Zealand managed to score 358 in the first innings.
