= Jimmy Kamande =

Kenyan cricketer (born 1978)

Personal information
- Full name: James Kabatha Kamande
- Born: 12 December 1978 (age 47); Muranga, Kenya
- Batting: Right-handed
- Bowling: Right arm off break
- Role: Bowler

International information
- National side: Kenya (1999–2011)
- ODI debut (cap 20): 15 May 1999 v Zimbabwe
- Last ODI: 13 March 2011 v Australia
- T20I debut (cap 3): 1 September 2007 v Bangladesh
- Last T20I: 11 February 2010 v Netherlands

Domestic team information
- Years: Team
- 2006/07: Kenya Select
- Coast Pekee
- Nairobi Gymkhana

Head coaching information
- Years: Team
- 2022–present: Tanzania

Career statistics
Competition	ODI	T20I	FC	LA
Matches	86	12	21	117
Runs scored	1,055	83	630	1,353
Batting average	17.29	9.22	18.52	16.30
100s/50s	0/3	0/0	0/3	0/6
Top score	74	42	75	74
Balls bowled	2,619	206	2,394	3,339
Wickets	48	13	24	63
Bowling average	45.18	16.30	48.87	42.46
5 wickets in innings	0	0	0	0
10 wickets in match	0	0	0	0
Best bowling	4/36	3/28	4/56	4/36
Catches/stumpings	20/–	1/–	16/0	34/–
- Source: ESPNcricinfo, 15 May 2017

James Kabatha Kamande (born 12 December 1978) is a former Kenyan cricketer and former limited over captain. He is a right-handed batsman and an off break bowler.

== International career ==
Kamande made his One Day International debut for Kenya in the 1999 World Cup in England.

In the 2011 ICC Cricket World Cup, Kamande captained the Kenyan cricket team for the first time in a World Cup. But poor performance in the tournament led him to be sacked him from captaincy.

== Coaching career ==
Kamande coached the Kenya national under-19 cricket team at the 2018 Under-19 Cricket World Cup in New Zealand.

Kamande was appointed coach of the Tanzania national cricket team in 2022.
