= Wayne (given name) =

Wayne is an English masculine given name that is derived from the surname Wayne. It may refer to:

- Wayne Aberhart (born 1958), New Zealand cricketer
- Wayne A. Abernathy, American economist and banker
- Wayne Adams (born 1943), Canadian politician
- Wayne Aiken (1935–2012), Canadian CFL player
- Wayne Albee (1882–1937), American pictorialist photographer
- Wayne Alexander (actor), American actor
- Wayne Alexander (boxer) (born 1973), British boxer
- Wayne Allard (born 1943), American veterinarian and politician
- Wayne Alley (born 1932), American inactive district judge
- Wayne Allison (Canadian football) (1949–2005), Canadian CFL player
- Wayne Allison (born 1968), English footballer and coach
- Wayne Allwine (1947–2009), American voice actor, sound effects editor, and foley artist
- Wayne Alstat (1934–2019), American farmer and politician
- Wayne Ambler (1915–1998), American MLB player
- Wayne Andersen (born 1945), American district judge
- Wayne D. Anderson (1930–2013), American college basketball coach
- Wayne Anderson (politician) (born 1953 or 1954), Canadian politician in Alberta
- Wayne Anderson (racing driver, born 1946), American stock car racing driver and team owner
- Wayne Anderson (racing driver, born 1968), American race car driver
- Wayne Anderson (swimmer) (born 1945), American former swimmer
- Wayne Andre (1931–2003), American jazz trombonist
- Wayne Andrews (cricketer) (born 1958), Western Australian cricketer
- Wayne Andrews (footballer) (born 1977), English association footballer
- Wayne Andrews (historian) (1913–1987), American historian
- Wayne Angell (born 1930), American economist, politician, and professor
- Wayne Angevine (born 1935), American politician
- Wayne Arendse (born 1984), South African soccer player
- Wayne P. Armstrong, American natural historian, author, and photographer
- Wayne Arnold (born 1984), American professional basketball player
- Wayne Arthurs (politician) (born 1948), member of the Legislative Assembly of Ontario
- Wayne Arthurs (tennis) (born 1971), Australian tennis player
- Wayne Arthurson, Canadian writer
- Wayne Artman (1936–2006), American sound engineer
- Wayne N. Aspinall (1896–1983), American lawyer and politician
- Wayne Athorne (1941–1992), Australian decathlete and VFL player
- Wayne Atwood (born 1964), Welsh professional darts player
- Wayne Au (born 1972), American educational researcher and professor
- Wayne Babych (born 1958), Canadian NHL player
- Wayne Baker, American author and sociologist
- Wayne Baker (American football) (born 1953), American NFL player
- Wayne Baker (footballer) (born 1965), English footballer
- Wayne Balcaen, Canadian politician
- Wayne Barker (born 1963), South African visual artist
- Wayne Barlow (1912–1996), American composer
- Wayne Barlowe, American science fiction and fantasy writer, painter, and concept artist
- Wayne Barnes (born 1979), English international rugby union referee and barrister
- Wayne Barrett (1945–2017), American journalist
- Wayne Barrett (kickboxer) (born 1986), American kickboxer
- Wayne Barrow (born 1965), American film producer, talent manager, and businessman
- Wayne Bartholomew (born 1954), Australian surfer, surf sports innovator, community advocate, and politician
- Wayne Bartrim (born 1971), Australian professional rugby league footballer
- Wayne Bastrup (born 1976), American actor and musician
- Wayne Baughman (1941–2022), American wrestler, coach, and ultra-endurance athlete
- Wayne W. Bayless (1895–1975), American attorney and politician
- Wayne M. Becker, American biochemist
- Wayne Beddison (born 1961), Australian VFL player
- Wayne Belardi (1930–1993), American MLB player
- Wayne Bell, American computer programmer
- Wayne Benn (born 1976), English football manager/coach and former professional player
- Wayne "Lotek" Bennett (born 1977), Musical artist
- Wayne Bennett (blues guitarist) (1931–1992), American blues guitarist
- Wayne Bennett (rugby league) (born 1950), Australian rugby league coach and former footballer
- Wayne D. Bennett (1927–2015), American politician
- Wayne Benson (born 1969), American mandolinist and songwriter
- Wayne Curtis Bent (born 1941), American leader of Lord Our Righteousness Church
- Wayne Bentson, American businessman and tax protester
- Wayne Bergeron (born 1958), American jazz trumpeter
- Wayne Berman (born 1956), American businessman and former lobbyist
- Wayne Berry (born 1942), Australian politician
- Wayne Berry (American football) (1932–2018), American NFL player
- Wayne Besen (born 1970), American LGBT rights advocate
- Wayne Bevan (born 1953), Australian VFL player
- Wayne Bianchin (born 1953), Canadian-born Italian NHL player
- Wayne Bickerton (1941–2015), British record producer, songwriter, and music business executive
- Wayne Biggins (born 1961), English SFL player
- Wayne Bird (born 1966), South African cricketer
- Wayne Black (born 1973), Zimbabwean professional tennis player
- Wayne Blackburn (1914–2000), American MLB coach, minor league player-manager, and World War II personnel
- Wayne Blackman (born 1975), Barbadian cricketer
- Wayne Blackshear (born 1992), American professional basketball player
- Wayne Blackwell (born 1960), Australian WANFL and VFL player
- Wayne Blair (cricketer) (1948–2019), New Zealand cricketer
- Wayne Blair (director) (born 1971), Indigenous Australian actor
- Wayne K. Blickenstaff (1920–2011), American World War II flying ace
- Wayne Bloom (born 1958), American professional wrestler
- Wayne Bock (1934–2016), American NFL player
- Wayne Boden (1948–2006), Canadian serial killer and rapist
- Wayne Bolt, American NFL coach
- Wayne Bond (born 1986), Papua New Guinea professional rugby league footballer
- Wayne Bonney (born 1953), Canadian WHA and NHL player
- Wayne C. Booth (1921–2005), American literary critic
- Wayne G. Borah (1891–1966), American circuit judge
- Wayne Boring (1905–1987), American comic book artist
- Wayne Bourque (born 1959), Canadian boxer
- Wayne Bowen, American pharmacologist and biologist
- Wayne Boyd (born 1990), British racing driver
- Wayne Boyer (born 1937), American filmmaker
- Wayne Brabender (born 1945), American-born Spanish professional basketball player and coach
- Wayne Brady (born 1972), American television personality, comedian, actor, and singer
- Wayne Braithwaite (born 1975), Guyanese professional boxer
- Wayne Brasler (born 1940), American journalist
- Wayne Brenkert (1898–1979), American professional football player and coach
- Wayne Brent, American basketball coach
- Wayne Bridge (born 1980), English professional footballer
- Wayne Bridges (1936–2020), British professional wrestler
- Wayne Briggs (born 1944), New Zealand motorcycle speedway rider
- Wayne Brightwell (born 1957), Canadian wrestler
- Wayne Brittain (born 1958), Australian AFL coach
- Wayne Brittenden, New Zealand journalist
- Wayne Broad (born 1956), Australian cricketer
- Wayne Brock (born 1948), American professional scouter
- Wayne Broeren (1933–1991), American Paralympic athlete
- Wayne Baker Brooks (born 1970), American blues and blues-rock guitarist and singer
- Wayne Brown (American politician) (1936–2013), American politician
- Wayne Brown (author) (1944–2009), Trinidad and Tobago writer
- Wayne Brown (footballer, born 1988), English footballer
- Wayne Brown (footballer, born August 1977), English footballer
- Wayne Brown (footballer, born January 1977), English footballer and coach
- Wayne Brown (ice hockey) (1930–2019), Canadian ice hockey player
- Wayne Brown (New Zealand politician) (born 1946), Mayor of Auckland
- Wayne Brown (snooker player) (born 1969), English snooker player
- Wayne Brown (speedway rider) (1959–1991), New Zealand speedway rider
- Wayne Bryan, American tennis coach, author, and speaker
- Wayne R. Bryant (born 1947), American politician
- Wayne Buchanan (born 1982), Northern Irish footballer
- Wayne Budd (born 1941), American lawyer and jurist
- Wayne Bullimore (born 1970), English footballer
- Wayne Bulpitt (born 1961), British Chief Commissioner for The Scout Association
- Wayne Burden, American NBL player
- Wayne Burgess (born 1971), South African cyclist
- Wayne Burkes (1929–2020), American politician, Baptist minister, and military officer
- Wayne Burnett (born 1971), English football coach, former player, and current manager
- Wayne Burton, Canadian para-alpine skier
- Wayne Burtt (1944–2023), New Zealand cricketer
- Wayne Bush, American diplomat
- Wayne Butler, Australian convicted murderer
- Wayne Cage (born 1951), American MLB player
- Wayne Caines, Bermudian politician
- Wayne Caldwell (born 1948), American novelist and poet
- Wayne Campbell (born 1972), Australian AFL player
- Wayne Cao (born 1946), Canadian politician
- Wayne Capers (born 1961), American NFL player
- Wayne Carew, Canadian businessman and politician
- Wayne Carey (born 1971), Australian AFL player
- Wayne Carini (born 1951), American car restorer and TV personality
- Wayne Carlander, American basketball player
- Wayne Carleton (born 1946), Canadian NHL and WHA player
- Wayne Carlisle (born 1979), Northern Irish professional footballer
- Wayne Carpendale (born 1977), German actor
- Wayne Carr (1897–1954), American Negro League pitcher
- Wayne Carroll (born 1958), Australian VFL player
- Wayne Carroll (basketball) (born 1959), Australian NBL player
- Wayne Carson (1943–2015), American country musician, songwriter, and record producer
- Wayne Cascio, American economist, professor, and psychologist
- Wayne Cashman (born 1945), Canadian NHL player and coach
- Wayne M. Catalano (born 1956), American jockey and current horse racing trainer
- Wayne Causey (born 1936), American MLB player
- Wayne A. Cauthen (born 1955), American politician
- Wayne Cegielski (born 1956), Welsh EFL player
- Wayne Chabre (born 1947), American sculptor
- Wayne Challis (born 1963), Australian professional rugby league footballer
- Wayne Chambers (1936–1999), American jockey
- Wayne Chaney Jr., American senior pastor, author, entrepreneur, and radio and TV personality
- Wayne Chang (born 1983), Taiwanese-born American entrepreneur, angel investor, film producer, and philanthropist
- Wayne Chapman (American football) (1937–2017), American football player and coach
- Wayne Chapman (basketball) (born 1945), American basketball player and coach
- Wayne Chatfield-Taylor (1893–1967), American economist
- Wayne Chaulk, Canadian member of musical and comedy group Buddy Wasisname and the Other Fellers
- Wayne Cheesman, Canadian ice hockey player
- Wayne Chernecki (1949–2013), Canadian WHL player
- Wayne Cherry (born 1937), American car designer
- Wayne Cheverie (born 1950), Canadian attorney, politician, government minister, and judge
- Wayne Chew (born 2001), Singaporean footballer
- Wayne Chisholm (born 1964), Australian professional rugby league footballer
- Wayne Chism (born 1987), American-Bahraini PBA player
- Wayne Chrebet (born 1973), American NFL player
- Wayne Christian (born 1950), American politician and financial planner
- Wayne Cilento (born 1949), American director, choreographer, actor, and dancer
- Wayne Clairmont (born 1943), Canadian EHL player
- Wayne Clark (disambiguation), several people
- Wayne Clarke (disambiguation), several people
- Wayne Clarkson (born 1943), Canadian film industry executive
- Wayne Clements, British contemporary artist and poet
- Wayne Clifford (born 1944), Canadian poet and academic
- Wayne Clifford (rugby league) (born 1975), Australian professional rugby league footballer
- Wayne Closter (born 1945), Australian VFL player
- Wayne K. Clymer (1917–2013), American Methodist bishop
- Wayne Coates, American politician
- Wayne Cochran (1939–2017), American singer
- Wayne Cody (1936–2002), American radio and television sportscaster
- Wayne Coffey (disambiguation), several people
- Wayne Cohen, American songwriter, producer, artist developer, and music educator
- Wayne Coles-Janess, Australian producer, writer, and director
- Wayne Collett (1949–2010), American Olympic sprinter
- Wayne Collins (disambiguation), several people
- Wayne Colman (born 1946), American NFL player
- Wayne Comer (born 1944), American MLB player
- Wayne Connally (1923–2000), American politician
- Wayne Connelly (born 1939), Canadian NHL player
- Wayne Connolly, Australian musician, record producer, and audio engineer
- Wayne Connors (born 1936), Canadian politician
- Wayne Conrad (born 1946), Canadian CFL player
- Wayne Cook (American football) (born 1971), American football player
- Wayne Cook (musician) (born 1946), American keyboardist
- Wayne Cooney (born 1968), English footballer of Irish descent
- Wayne Cooper (disambiguation), several people
- Wayne Corden (born 1975), English EFL player
- Wayne A. Cornelius (born 1945), American scholar of Mexican immigration policy
- Wayne Cotter, American comedian
- Wayne Cottrell (1943–2013), New Zealand rugby union player
- Wayne Couzens, English police officer convicted of murder, kidnapping, and rape
- Wayne Cowan (born 1949), American professional wrestling manager, booker, and professional wrestler
- Wayne Coy (1903–1957), American politician
- Wayne Coyne (born 1961), American musician
- Wayne Crawford (1947–2016), American film and television actor, film producer, director, and screenwriter
- Wayne Crouse (1924–2000), American classical violist and professor emeritus
- Wayne Crow (born 1938), American AFL player
- Wayne Crump (born 1949/1950), American politician
- Wayne Cryts, American farmer
- Wayne Cuff (born 1971), Jamaican cricketer
- Wayne K. Curry (1951–2014), American politician
- Wayne Curtis (born 1980), English footballer
- Wayne Curtis (footballer, born 1967) (born 1967), Welsh professional footballer
- Wayne Cusic (1905–1993), American football and basketball player and coach
- Wayne Daniel (born 1956), Barbadian-born Australian cricketer
- Wayne Daniels (born 1987), American AFL, CIF, and PIFL player
- Wayne Darwen, Australian journalist, television producer, and filmmaker
- Wayne Davenport (1906–2001), American NFL player
- Wayne David (born 1957), British politician
- Wayne Davis (cornerback) (1963–2008), American football player
- Wayne Davis (hurdler) (born 1991), American athlete
- Wayne Davis (linebacker) (born 1964), American football player
- Wayne Davis (philosopher) (born 1951), American philosopher
- Wayne Davis (World Scout Committee), Scout leader and educator
- Wayne Dawson (born 1955), American television newscaster
- Wayne DeAngelo (born 1965), American politician
- Wayne DeAtley (born 1958), American bobsledder
- Wayne Dehart, American film-, stage-, and television actor
- Wayne Deledio (born 1955), Australian VFL player
- Wayne Delmenico (born 1952), Australian VFL and WAFL player
- Wayne Denne (born 1976), South African field hockey player
- Wayne Denning, Indigenous Australian businessman
- Wayne Dennis (born 1940), Canadian football player
- Wayne DeSarbo, American statistician
- Wayne Dessaur (born 1971), English cricketer
- Wayne DeSutter (born 1944), American NFL player
- Wayne Devlin (born 1944), Australian boxer
- Wayne Diamond, American fashion designer
- Wayne Dickens, American football player and coach
- Wayne Dickert (born 1958), American slalom canoer
- Wayne Dillon (born 1955), Canadian WHA and NHL player
- Wayne Diplock (born 1968), Australian rower
- Wayne Dobbs (1939–2015), American college basketball and baseball coach
- Wayne Dobson (born 1957), English magician
- Wayne Dockery (1941–2018), American jazz double bassist
- Wayne Dodd (born 1930), American poet and poetry teacher
- Wayne C. Doty (born 1973), American murderer
- Wayne Douglas King (born 1955), American politician and author
- Wayne Douglas Quinn (1941–1987), American painter
- Wayne R. Douglas (born 1951/1952), American lawyer and jurist
- Wayne Douglas, English man killed in the 1995 Brixton riot
- Wayne Dover (born 1973), Guyanese professional footballer and manager
- Wayne Dowd (1941–2016), American politician and lawyer
- Wayne Dowdy (born 1943), American politician, lawyer, and jurist
- Wayne Dowell (born 1973), English professional footballer
- Wayne A. Downing (1940–2007), American Army general
- Wayne Drinkwalter (born 1966), Canadian CFL player
- Wayne Dropulich (born 1970/1971), Australian politician
- Wayne Drysdale, Canadian politician
- Wayne Ducheneaux (1936–2012), Native American rancher, leader, and US Marine
- Wayne Duke (1928–2017), American collegiate sports executive
- Wayne Duke (footballer) (born 1955), Australian VFL player
- Wayne DuMond (1949–2005), American convicted murderer and rapist
- Wayne Dumont (1914–1992), American politician
- Wayne Duncan (musician) (1944–2016), Australian rock musician
- Wayne Dustin (born 1965), Canadian cross-country skier
- Wayne Duvall (born 1958), American actor
- Wayne Duvenage (born 1960), South African businessman, entrepreneur, and civil activist
- Wayne Dwyer, New Zealand rugby league footballer
- Wayne Dyer (1940–2015), American self-help author and motivational speaker
- Wayne Dyer (footballer) (born 1977), English professional footballer
- Wayne R. Dynes (1934–2021), American art historian, encyclopedist, and bibliographer
- Wayne Eagling (born 1950), Canadian ballet dancer
- Wayne Easter (born 1949), Canadian politician
- Wayne Eastman (born 1942), Australian VFL player
- Wayne Ebanks (born 1964), English footballer
- Wayne Edwards (baseball) (born 1964), American baseball player
- Wayne Edwards (British Army soldier) (1966–1993), British soldier
- Wayne Edwards (racing driver) (born 1967), American racing driver
- Wayne Ehlers (born 1938), American politician
- Wayne Elcock (born 1974), British professional boxer
- Wayne Elhard (born 1947), Canadian politician
- Wayne Ellington (born 1987), American NBA player
- Wayne Ellis (1968–2018), Welsh boxer
- Wayne Elsey (born 1965), American entrepreneur, philanthropist, and social activist
- Wayne Embry (born 1937), American NBA player
- Wayne Engelstad (born 1965), American NBA and NBL player
- Wayne England (1959/1960–2016), English artist
- Wayne Enoka (born 1970), New Zealand cricketer and coach
- Wayne Entwistle (born 1958), English professional footballer
- Wayne Epp, Canadian Paralympic volleyball player
- Wayne Erdman (born 1952), Canadian judoka
- Wayne Escoffery (born 1975), American jazz saxophonist
- Wayne Estes (1943–1965), American basketball player
- Wayne Evans (Australian footballer) (born 1958), Australian rules footballer
- Wayne Evans (rugby league) (born 1974), Australian rugby league footballer
- Wayne Evans (rugby union) (born 1984), Welsh rugby player
- Wayne Evans (Welsh footballer) (1971–2023), Welsh footballer
- Wayne Ewasko, Canadian politician
- Wayne Ewin (born 1953), Australian VFL player
- Wayne S. Ewing (1929–2010), American politician
- Wayne Eyre (born 1966/1967), Canadian general
- Wayne Faircloth (born 1953), American politician
- Wayne Fairclough (born 1968), English professional footballer
- Wayne Falla (born 1970), English cricketer
- Wayne Farnham, Australian politician
- Wayne Faucher, American comic book inker
- Wayne H. Fawbush (born 1944), American politician
- Wayne Federman (born 1959), American comedian, actor, author, writer, comedy historian, producer, and musician
- Wayne Fella Morrison, Aboriginal man who died in custody
- Wayne Fensham (born 1958), South African cricketer and field hockey player
- Wayne Fenton (1953–2006), American psychiatrist
- Wayne Fereday (born 1963), English professional footballer
- Wayne Fernandes (born 1978), Canadian field hockey player
- Wayne Ferreira (born 1971), South African professional tennis player and current coach
- Wayne Firestone, American-born Israeli playwright and veteran non-profit leader
- Wayne Fisk (born 1945), American Air Force pararescueman
- Wayne Fitzgerald (1930–2019), American film title designer
- Wayne Fitzgerrell (1908–1965), American farmer and politician
- Wayne Fleming (1950–2013), Canadian NHL assistant coach
- Wayne Flower, American member of alternative rock band Treepeople
- Wayne Flynn (born 1970), English professional rugby league footballer
- Wayne Flynt (born 1940), American professor emeritus of history
- Wayne Fontana (1945–2020), English rock and pop singer
- Wayne D. Fontana (born 1950), American politician
- Wayne Fontes (born 1940), American NFL coach and player
- Wayne Forbes, Canadian candidate in the Freedom Party of Ontario 2003 provincial election
- Wayne Ford (criminal) (born 1946), Canadian criminal
- Wayne Ford (politician) (born 1951), American politician and college football player
- Wayne Adam Ford (born 1961), American serial killer
- Wayne Foreman (born 1955), Australian VFL player
- Wayne Foster (born 1963), English professional footballer
- Wayne Fowler (born 1948), American NFL player
- Wayne Fox (born 1959), Australian TANFL, TFL, and VFL player
- Wayne Franklin (born 1974), American MLB pitcher
- Wayne Fraser (born 1956), Canadian politician
- Wayne Frazier (1939–2012), American AFL player
- Wayne Frederick (soccer) (born 2004), American soccer player
- Wayne A. I. Frederick (born 1971), Trinidadian-American scholar, surgeon, and university administrator
- Wayne Freedman, American feature reporter
- Wayne Froman, American actor
- Wayne Fromm (born 1954), Canadian inventor and entrepreneur
- Wayne Frost (1963–2008), birth name of American breakdancer Frosty Freeze
- Wayne Frye (1930–2014), American competition rower and Olympic champion
- Wayne Fuller (born 1931), American statistician
- Wayne Fyvie (born 1972), South African rugby union player
- Wayne Gagné (born 1964), Canadian AHL player
- Wayne Gallman (born 1994), American NFL player
- Wayne Gammon (born 1950), Australian rower
- Wayne Gandy (born 1971), American college and NFL player
- Wayne Gardner, American past member of progressive metal/rock band Magellan (band)
- Wayne L. Gardner (born 1947), American politician
- Wayne Gardner (born 1959), Australian professional motorcycle and touring car racer
- Wayne Garfield (1952–2022), American composer, collaborating songwriter, vocalist, social entrepreneur, community activist, and producer
- Wayne Garland (born 1950), American MLB pitcher
- Wayne Garner (born 1951), American politician
- Wayne Garratt (1968–1992), English speedway rider
- Wayne Garrett (born 1947), American MLB player
- Wayne Garvie (born 1963), English television industry executive
- Wayne Gates, Canadian politician
- Wayne Gaudet (born 1955), Canadian politician
- Wayne Giardino (1943–2021), Canadian athlete and Canadian football coach
- Wayne Gibbens (born 1937), American politician
- Wayne Gibson (1942–2004), English pop singer
- Wayne Gift (1915–1998), American NFL player
- Wayne Gilbert, Canadian animator
- Wayne Gilbert (artist) (born 1946), American artist and gallerist
- Wayne Gilchrest (born 1946), American politician
- Wayne Gill (born 1975), English footballer and current physio
- Wayne Girard, Saint Lucian politician
- Wayne Gladstone, American writer, humorist, and novelist
- Wayne Glasgow (1926–2000), American basketball player
- Wayne Goddard (1914–1984), American football player and coach
- Wayne Godwin (born 1982), English professional rugby league footballer
- Wayne Goldthorpe (born 1957), English professional footballer
- Wayne Gomes (born 1973), American MLB relief pitcher
- Wayne Gonzales (born 1957), American painter
- Wayne Goodison (born 1964), English professional footballer
- Wayne Goodman, American psychiatrist and researcher
- Wayne Goodwin (born 1967), American politician
- Wayne Gordon (boxer) (born 1963), Canadian boxer
- Wayne Gordon (footballer) (1954–1983), Australian rules footballer
- Wayne Goss (1951–2014), Australian politician
- Wayne Goss (make-up artist) (born 1978), English makeup artist, YouTube personality, and entrepreneur
- Wayne Gould (born 1945), New Zealand-born Hong Kong judge
- Wayne Gowing, Canadian ice hockey player and coach
- Wayne Grady (born 1957), Australian professional golfer
- Wayne Grady (author) (born 1948), Canadian writer, editor, and translator
- Wayne Graham (field hockey) (born 1965), South African field hockey player
- Wayne Graham (rugby union) (born 1957), New Zealand rugby union player
- Wayne Graham (born 1936), American baseball coach and MLB player
- Wayne Granger (born 1944), American MLB relief pitcher
- Wayne Graves (born 1980), English footballer
- Wayne Gray (footballer) (born 1980), English footballer
- Wayne D. Gray, American academic
- Wayne Grayson, American voice actor and director
- Wayne Green (1922–2013), American publisher, writer, and consultant
- Wayne Greenhaw (1940–2011), American writer and journalist
- Wayne Greenstreet (born 1949), New Zealand cricketer
- Wayne Gretzky (born 1961), Canadian NHL player and coach
- Wayne Griffin (born 1975), Australian artificial heart patient
- Wayne Grigsby (born 1947), Canadian screenwriter and producer
- Wayne Grimditch (born 1955?), American water skier
- Wayne Grimmer (born 1960), Canadian field hockey player
- Wayne R. Grisham (1923–2011), American politician
- Wayne Gross (born 1952), American MLB player
- Wayne Groulx (born 1965), Canadian-born Austrian NHL player
- Wayne C. Grover (1906–1970), American archivist
- Wayne Grubb (born 1976), American NASCAR driver and current crew chief
- Wayne Grubb (American football) (born c. 1938), American football and baseball coach
- Wayne Grudem (born 1948), American scholar, theologian, seminary professor, and author
- Wayne Guppy (born 1954), New Zealand politician
- Wayne Haag, Australian artist and illustrator
- Wayne Haddix (born 1965), American NFL player
- Wayne Haensel (1936–2012), American NFL and CFL player and coach
- Wayne Hagin (born 1956), American sportscaster
- Wayne Hale (born 1954), American NASA engineer
- Wayne B. Hales (1893–1980), American educator
- Wayne Hall (footballer) (born 1968), English footballer
- Wayne Hall (ice hockey) (born 1939), Canadian ice hockey player
- Wayne Hamilton, Northern Irish racer in the 2011 Manx Grand Prix
- Wayne Hammond (American football) (born 1953), American football player
- Wayne Hammond (field hockey) (born 1948), Australian field hockey player
- Wayne G. Hammond (born 1953), American scholar
- Wayne Hampson (born 1957), Australian professional tennis player
- Wayne Hancock (born 1965), American singer-songwriter
- Wayne Handley (born 1939), American airshow performer and coach, naval aviator, agricultural pilot, and ACE
- Wayne Handy (1935–2025), American rock and roll singer
- Wayne Hankey (1944–2022), Canadian religious philosopher
- Wayne Hankin, American musician, conductor, and composer
- Wayne Hansen (1928–1987), American NFL player
- Wayne Hardin (1926–2017), American football player and coach
- Wayne Harley Brachman, American pastry chef
- Wayne Harmes (born 1960), Australian VFL player
- Wayne Alan Harold (born 1964), American independent editor, publisher, and filmmaker
- Wayne Harper (born 1956), American politician
- Wayne Harris (disambiguation), several people
- Wayne Harrison (disambiguation), several people
- Wayne Hart, Canadian member of the Hart wrestling family
- Wayne Hart (curler) (born 1949), Canadian curler
- Wayne Hart (1889–1970), American football player, coach, and college athletics administrator
- Wayne A. Hartman (born 1967), American politician
- Wayne Hatswell (born 1975), English professional footballer
- Wayne Hawkins (1938–2022), American AFL player
- Wayne Haylen, Australian judge
- Wayne Hays (1911–1989), American politician
- Wayne Headlam (born 1948), Australian VFL player
- Wayne Hearn (born 1962), American professional tennis player
- Wayne Hector, British songwriter
- Wayne Heffley (1927–2008), American television and film actor
- Wayne Hemingway (born 1961), English designer
- Wayne Henderson (disambiguation), several people
- Wayne Hendrickson (born 1941), American biophysicist and professor
- Wayne J. Henke (born 1941), American politician
- Wayne Hennessey (born 1987), Welsh professional footballer
- Wayne Henry Garrison (born 1959), American serial killer
- Wayne Henwood (born 1962), Australian VFL/AFL player
- Wayne Hernaman (born 1972), Australian AFL player
- Wayne Heseltine, English professional footballer
- Wayne Hicks (born 1937), American-born Canadian NHL player
- Wayne Higby (born 1943), American artist working in ceramics
- Wayne Hightower (1940–2002), American NBA player
- Wayne Hildred (born 1955), New Zealand racing cyclist
- Wayne Hill (born 1953), Australian cricketer
- Wayne L. Hill, American candidate in the 2010 House of Representatives elections
- Wayne Hillman (1938–1990), Canadian NHL and WHA player
- Wayne Hockley (born 1978), English professional footballer
- Wayne Hodgson (1959–2013), New Zealand cricketer
- Wayne Hoffman (born 1981), American mentalist and illusionist
- Wayne Hoffman (author), American author and journalist
- Wayne Hogg (born 1980), Scottish international indoor and lawn bowler
- Wayne Holden (1918–2009), American politician
- Wayne Holdsworth (born 1968), Australian cricketer
- Wayne Holland (born 1958), American politician
- Wayne Holmes (born 1950), American wrestler
- Wayne H. Holtzman (1923–2019), American psychologist
- Wayne J. Hood (1913–1988), American politician
- Wayne Hooper (1920–2007), American gospel music composer, arranger, and singer
- Wayne Hope, Australian actor, writer, director, and producer
- Wayne Horowitz, American archeologist and academic
- Wayne Horsburgh (born 1955), Australian country music entertainer
- Wayne L. Horvitz (1920–2009), American labor negotiator
- Wayne Horvitz (born 1955), American composer, keyboardist, and record producer
- Wayne Housie (born 1965), American MLB player
- Wayne Hovey (born 1956), Australian VFL player
- Wayne Howard (1949–2007), American comic book artist
- Wayne Howard (American football) (born 1931), American football coach
- Wayne Howell (1921–1993), American voice-over announcer
- Wayne Hsiung (born 1981), American attorney and activist
- Wayne L. Hubbell (born 1943), American biochemist
- Wayne Hughes (disambiguation), several people
- Wayne Huizenga (1937–2018), American businessman, entrepreneur, and philanthropist
- Wayne Hunter (born 1981), American NFL player
- Wayne Hussey (born 1958), English musician
- Wayne Hutchinson, Irish sportsperson
- Wayne Hutchinson (jockey) (born 1981), British jockey
- Wayne Hynes (born 1969), Canadian-born German IIHF player
- Wayne Inouye (born 1953), American businessman of Japanese descent
- Wayne Isham (born 1958), American film and music video director
- Wayne Ison (1924–2014), American aircraft designer
- Wayne Jacks (born 1949), American stock car racing driver
- Wayne Jackson (disambiguation), several people
- Wayne Jacobs (born 1969), English football coach and former professional player
- Wayne Jacobsen (born 1953), American author and former pastor
- Wayne Jacques, Canadian politician
- Wayne James (born 1965), Zimbabwean cricketer
- Wayne Jarratt (1957–1988), Australian stage and television actor
- Wayne Jarrett (born 1956), Jamaican-born American reggae recording artist
- Wayne Jentas (born 1954), Canadian soccer player
- Wayne Jim (1961–2018), Canadian politician
- Wayne Jobson (born 1954), Jamaican record producer
- Wayne Johnsen (born 1977), American professional boxer
- Wayne Johnson (disambiguation), several people
- Wayne Johnston (disambiguation), several people
- Wayne Jonas, American family physician, retired army medical officer, and alternative medicine researcher
- Wayne Jones (disambiguation), several people
- Wayne Judd (born 1948), Australian VFL player
- Wayne Judson (born 1952), Australian VFL player
- Wayne Julies (born 1978), South African rugby union footballer
- Wayne Lin Junjie, birth name of JJ Lin (born 1981), Singaporean singer, songwriter, record producer, and actor
- Wayne Kaatz, American writer and actor
- Wayne Kakela (1904–1955), American NFL player
- Wayne Karlin (born 1945), American author, editor, and teacher
- Wayne Kellestine (born 1949), Canadian outlaw biker, gangster, and convicted murderer
- Wayne Kelly (born 1963), Canadian swimmer
- Wayne Kemp (1940–2015), American country music singer-songwriter
- Wayne G. Kenyon (born 1933), American educator and politician
- Wayne Kerr (born 1985), Irish professional rugby league footballer
- Wayne Kerrins (born 1965), English footballer
- Wayne Kidwell (born 1938), American lawyer and jurist
- Wayne Kiel (born 1949), Canadian curler and coach
- Wayne Kierans, Gaelic football manager
- Wayne Kimber (1949–2004), New Zealand politician
- Wayne Kimmel (born 1970), American venture capitalist, investor, and author
- Wayne King (1901–1985), American musician, songwriter, and bandleader
- Wayne King (ice hockey) (born 1951), Canadian NHL player
- Wayne Kingery (1927–2016), American NFL player
- Wayne Kirby (born 1964), American MLB player and current coach
- Wayne Kirkpatrick (born c. 1961), American songwriter and musician
- Wayne Knight (born 1955), American actor
- Wayne Knights (born 1970), New Zealand cricket umpire
- Wayne Knox (1927–2019), American politician and teacher
- Wayne Koestenbaum (born 1958), American artist, poet, and cultural critic
- Wayne Kramer (1948–2024), American guitarist, singer, songwriter, producer, and film and television composer
- Wayne Kramer (filmmaker) (born 1965), South African filmmaker and storyboard artist
- Wayne Krantz (born 1967), American guitarist and composer
- Wayne Kreklow (born 1957), American volleyball coach and former NBA player
- Wayne Krenchicki (1954–2018), American MLB player
- Wayne Krieger (born 1940), American politician
- Wayne Krivsky (born 1954), American MLB executive
- Wayne LaFave (born 1931), American legal scholar
- Wayne Lai (born 1964), Hong Kong actor
- Wayne Laird, New Zealand composer and producer
- Wayne LaMaster (1907–1989), American MLB pitcher
- Wayne Lamb (1920–2001), American dancer, choreographer, theater director, and professor of dance
- Wayne Lamb (footballer) (born 1972), Australian AFL player
- Wayne W. Lambert (born 1936), American Air Force general
- Wayne Lambkin (born 1972), Australian professional rugby league footballer
- Wayne Langerholc, American attorney, former prosecutor, and politician
- Wayne Langlois, Canadian candidate in the 2006 Manitoba municipal elections
- Wayne Lanham, Australian Paralympic athlete
- Wayne LaPierre (born 1949), American gun rights lobbyist
- Wayne Larkin (1938–1968), Canadian AHL player
- Wayne Larkins (1953–2025), English cricketer
- Wayne Laroche, American politician
- Wayne Larrivee, American sportscaster
- Wayne Laryea (born 1952), British musician and television actor
- Wayne Laugesen, American columnist, video producer, gun rights advocate, and editor
- Wayne Lavallee, Canadian-Métis actor and singer-songwriter
- Wayne Law (born 1978), Welsh cricketer
- Wayne Lawrence (born 1974), Saint Kitts-born American documentary photographer
- Wayne LeBombard (1944–2022), American speed skater
- Wayne Lee (born 1959), Canadian CFL player
- Wayne Lela, American founder of Heterosexuals Organized for a Moral Environment
- Wayne Lemon, American playwright and screenwriter
- Wayne Lessard (born 1956), Canadian politician
- Wayne Levi (born 1952), American professional golfer
- Wayne Lewellen (1944–2009), American film distribution executive and producer
- Wayne Lewis (disambiguation), several people
- Wayne D. Lewis Jr., American academic administrator
- Wayne Lineburg (born 1974), American college football interim head coach
- Wayne Linton (born 1955), Australian VFL player
- Wayne Lo (born 1974), Taiwan-born American shooter
- Wayne Lock (born 1956), Welsh professional darts player
- Wayne Logan, American law professor
- Wayne Long (born 1963), Canadian politician
- Wayne Long (Arkansas politician), American politician
- Wayne Lordan, Irish jockey
- Wayne Lotter (1965–2017), South African wildlife conservationist
- Wayne Lozinak, American member of metalcore band Hatebreed
- Wayne Lucier (born 1979), American NFL player
- Wayne Lum (1943–2006), Canadian 3D sculptor and commercial artist
- Wayne Lundgren (born 1982), Australian ABL pitcher
- Wayne MacDonald (born 1954), American politician
- Wayne Macdonnell (born 1940), Canadian badminton player
- Wayne MacGregor (disambiguation), several people
- Wayne Mack (1924–1993), American broadcast journalist, television entertainer, and sportscaster
- Wayne MacVeagh (1833–1917), American lawyer, politician, diplomat
- Wayne Maddison, Canadian professor of zoology and botany
- Wayne Madkin (born 1979), American college football player
- Wayne Madsen (disambiguation), several people
- Wayne Mahney, Australian SANFL player
- Wayne Maki (1944–1974), Canadian NHL player
- Wayne Eyer Manning (1899–2004), American horticulturist and botanist
- Wayne Mansfield, Western Australian businessman and email spammer
- Wayne Mapp (born 1952), New Zealand politician
- Wayne Mardle (born 1973), English PDC and BDO player
- Wayne Marshall (disambiguation), several people
- Wayne Marston (born 1947), Canadian politician
- Wayne Martin (disambiguation), several people
- Wayne Mason (born 1949), New Zealand musician
- Wayne Mass (1946–2019), American NFL player
- Wayne Massarelli (1949–2012), American make-up artist
- Wayne Massey (born 1947), American country music artist and actor
- Wayne Masterson (1959–1991), British scientist
- Wayne Matewsky, American politician
- Wayne Matherne (born 1949), Canadian football player
- Wayne Matle (born 1988), South African PSL player
- Wayne Matthew (born 1958), Australian politician
- Wayne Matthews (American football) (born 2002), American football player
- Wayne Matthews (footballer) (born 1964), Welsh professional footballer
- Wayne Maunder (1937–2018), Canadian-born American actor
- Wayne Maurice Caron (1946–1968), American Navy soldier
- Wayne Maxner (born 1942), Canadian NHL, AHL, and WHL player
- Wayne Maxwell (born 1982), Australian professional motorcycle racer
- Wayne McAllister (1907–2000), American architect
- Wayne McBean (born 1969), Canadian NHL player
- Wayne McCarney (born 1966), Australian cyclist
- Wayne McClure (1942–2005), American AFL and NFL player
- Wayne J. McConnell (1912–1981), American football coach
- Wayne McCullough (born 1970), Northern Irish professional boxer
- Wayne McDade (born 1981), New Zealand-born Samoa international rugby league footballer
- Wayne McDaniel, American NBL player
- Wayne McDonald (born 1975), English professional rugby league footballer
- Wayne McGhie (1947–2017), Jamaican lead singer of Canadian funk band Wayne McGhie and the Sounds of Joy
- Wayne McGinn (born 1959), American football coach
- Wayne McIndoe (born 1972), New Zealand field hockey player
- Wayne McKay, Canadian New Democratic Party candidate in the 2008 federal election
- Wayne McKoy (born 1958), American professional basketball player
- Wayne McLaren (1940–1992), American stuntman, model, actor, and rodeo performer
- Wayne McLeland (1924–2004), American MLB pitcher
- Wayne McLoughlin (1944–2015), Welsh artist
- Wayne McMahen, American politician
- Wayne McNamara (born 1986), Irish hurler
- Wayne McPherson (born 1961), Australian professional rugby league footballer
- Wayne Meredith (born 1939), American IHL player and Olympian
- Wayne Merrick (born 1952), Canadian NHL player
- Wayne Merton (born 1943), Australian politician
- Wayne Messam (born 1974), American football player, businessman, and politician
- Wayne Messmer (born 1950), American professional speaker, singer, broadcaster, author, and actor
- Wayne Meyer (disambiguation), several people
- Wayne M. Meyers (1924–2018), American physician, microbiologist, chemist, humanitarian, and medical missionary
- Wayne Meylan (1946–1987), American NFL player
- Wayne Michaels (born 1959), English stuntman and stunt arranger
- Wayne Middaugh (born 1967), Canadian curler
- Wayne Milera (born 1997), Australian AFL player
- Wayne Miller (disambiguation), several people
- Wayne Millner (1913–1976), American NFL player
- Wayne Mills (disambiguation), several people
- Wayne Miner (1894–1918), American World War I soldier
- Wayne Minshew (1936–2015), American journalist and minor league baseball player
- Wayne Miranda (born 1957), Australian NSWRL player
- Wayne Mitchell (disambiguation), several people
- Wayne Mixson (1922–2020), American politician and farmer
- Wayne Miyata (1942–2005), American surfer
- Wayne Molis (1943–2002), American NBA player and firefighter
- Wayne Monteith, American Air Force brigadier general
- Wayne Moore (disambiguation), several people
- Wayne Morgan (disambiguation), several people
- Wayne Morrin (born 1955), Canadian WHA player
- Wayne Morris (1914–1959), American actor and World War II flying ace
- Wayne Morris (American football) (born 1954), American football player
- Wayne Morris (Australian footballer) (born 1947), Australian rules footballer
- Wayne Morse (1900–1974), American attorney and politician
- Wayne Mosdell (born 1944), Canadian WHA player
- Wayne Moses (born 1955), American football coach
- Wayne Moss (1938–2026), American guitarist, bassist, record producer, and songwriter
- Wayne Moulton (1932–1995), American motorcycle designer
- Wayne Moynihan (born 1947), American politician
- Wayne Mulherin (born 1957), Australian cricketer
- Wayne Mulligan (born 1947), American NFL player
- Wayne Muloin (born 1941), Canadian WHA and NHL player
- Wayne Mumford (born 1964), Welsh EFL player
- Wayne Munn (1896–1931), American professional wrestler and collegiate football player
- Wayne Munroe (born 1968), Bahamian lawyer
- Wayne Murray (born 1977), South African cricketer
- Wayne Nairn, New Zealand international lawn bowler
- Wayne Nance (1955–1986), American serial killer
- Wayne Nash (born 1965), British baseball coach
- Wayne E. Neill (born 1957), American diplomat
- Wayne Nelson (born 1950), American musician
- Wayne Nelson (statistician) (born 1936), American statistician
- Wayne Neville (born 1954), New Zealand rugby union player
- Wayne Newton (born 1942), American singer, actor, and entertainer
- Wayne Nichols (born 1978), Australian comic book artist
- Wayne L. Nicholson, American microbiologist and scientist
- Wayne L. Niederhauser (born 1959), American politician and accountant
- Wayne Noon (born 1971), English professional cricketer
- Wayne Nordhagen (born 1948), American MLB player
- Wayne Norman (born 1961), Canadian philosopher
- Wayne Northrop (born 1947), American actor
- Wayne Norton (1942–2018), Canadian professional baseball player, coach, and scout
- Wayne B. Nottingham (1899–1964), American physicist
- Wayne Nunnely (1952–2021), American NFL coach
- Wayne O'Connor (born 1978), Welsh rugby union player
- Wayne O'Gorman, Irish Gaelic footballer and hurler
- Wayne O'Sullivan (born 1974), Irish footballer and current manager
- Wayne Oates (1917–1999), American psychologist and religious educator
- Wayne Odesnik (born 1985), South African-born American professional tennis player
- Wayne Olhoft (born 1951), American politician and farmer
- Wayne Ong Chun Wei (born 1989), Malaysian politician
- Wayne Oquin (born 1977), American composer
- Wayne Ormond (businessman) (born 1973), Australian entrepreneur and businessman
- Wayne Osborne (baseball) (1912–1987), American baseball player
- Wayne Osborne (footballer) (born 1977), English former professional footballer
- Wayne Osgood, American criminologist and professor emeritus
- Wayne Osman (born 1950), English cricketer
- Wayne Osmond (1951–2025), American musician and singer
- Wayne Otto (born 1966), British karateka
- Wayne Otway (born 1956), Australian VFL player
- Wayne Ough (born 1978), Australian MLB and ABL pitcher
- Wayne D. Overholser (1906–1996), American Western writer
- Wayne Owens (1937–2002), American politician
- Wayne Pace (born 1946/1947), American chief financial officer
- Wayne Pacelle (born 1965), American activist, nonprofit chief executive, and animal welfare worker
- Wayne Pack (born 1950), American ABA player
- Wayne H. Page (1922–2001), American military officer and business executive
- Wayne Pai (1952–2008), Taiwanese businessman
- Wayne Panton, Caymanian politician
- Wayne Parkinson (1968–2005), birth name of Jamaican dancehall artist Baby Wayne
- Wayne Parnell (born 1989), South African professional cricketer
- Wayne Parrott, American agricultural and environmental science professor
- Wayne Parry (born 1963), American politician
- Wayne Pascoe (born 1955), Australian professional tennis player
- Wayne Pashley, Australian supervising sound editor, sound designer, and re-recording mixer
- Wayne Patchett, Australian Paralympic athlete
- Wayne Patrick (1946–2010), American AFL and NFL player
- Wayne Peace (born 1961), American NFL player and current high school coach
- Wayne Pearce (born 1960), Australian professional rugby league footballer and coach
- Wayne Peckham (1944–2016), Indigenous Australian rugby league footballer
- Wayne Pedzwater (1956–2005), American bassist
- Wayne Peet (born 1954), American jazz pianist and organist
- Wayne Péré (born 1965), American character actor
- Wayne Perkins (born 1951), American rock and R&B guitarist, singer, songwriter, and session musician
- Wayne Perry (disambiguation), several people
- Wayne Perryman (born 1945), American clergyman
- Wayne Perske (born 1974), Australian professional golfer
- Wayne Peters (born 1969), Australian VFL player
- Wayne Peterson (1927–2021), American composer, pianist, and educator
- Wayne Peterson (racing driver) (born 1938), American professional stock car racing owner/driver, paratrooper, and US SF member
- Wayne Petti, Canadian singer-songwriter
- Wayne Pettigrew, American politician
- Wayne Peveto, American politician
- Wayne Phillip (born 1977), West Indian cricketer
- Wayne Phillips (disambiguation), several people
- Wayne B. Phillips (born 1958), Australian cricketer
- Wayne Phipps (born 1973), Australian Paralympic judoka
- Wayne Pigram Australian Wrestler
- Wayne Pinnock (born 2000), Jamaican athlete
- Wayne Pivac (born 1962), New Zealand rugby union coach
- Wayne Pomeroy (1923–2019), American politician
- Wayne Popham (born 1929), American politician
- Wayne Portlock, Australian professional rugby league footballer
- Wayne Powell, Welsh professional footballer and manager
- Wayne Pratt (born 1960), English professional footballer
- Wayne Presley (born 1965), American NHL player
- Wayne Pretty (born 1936), Canadian rower
- Wayne Price, South African professional strongman competitor
- Wayne Pride (born 1943), Australian country music and memory lane musician
- Wayne Primeau (born 1976), Canadian NHL player
- Wayne Primmer (born 1959), Australian VFL and SANFL player
- Wayne Prior (born 1952), South Australian cricketer
- Wayne Proctor (born 1972), Welsh international rugby union footballer
- Wayne Proctor (rugby league) (born 1963), English professional rugby league footballer
- Wayne Proudfoot (born 1939), American scholar of religion
- Wayne Pullen (born 1945), Canadian archer
- Wayne Purser (born 1980), English footballer
- Wayne Pygram (born 1959), Australian actor
- Wayne Pyne (1917–2004), Canadian football player
- Wayne Quilliam (born 1963), Aboriginal Australian photographic artist, curator, and cultural adviser
- Wayne Quinn (born 1976), English professional footballer
- Wayne Quinton (1921–2015), American biomedical engineer
- Wayne Radford (basketball) (1956–2021), American basketball player
- Wayne Radford (cricketer) (born 1958), South African cricketer
- Wayne Radloff (born 1961), American NFL player
- Wayne Rainey (born 1960), American motorcycle road racer
- Wayne Ramsey (born 1957), Canadian NHL player
- Wayne Randazzo (born 1984), American sportscaster
- Wayne Randle (born 1964), British cyclist
- Wayne Raney (1921–1993), American country singer and harmonica player
- Wayne Rasmussen (born 1942), American NFL player
- Wayne Ratliff (born 1946), American computer scientist
- Wayne Raw (born 1994), Namibian cricketer
- Wayne Redmond (1945–2020), American MLB player
- Wayne Reid (1938–2021), Australian tennis player and sports administrator
- Wayne Reinagel (born 1961), American author, graphic artist, and publisher
- Wayne Reittie (born 1988), English-born Jamaican international rugby league footballer
- Wayne Reutimann (born 1944), American racing driver
- Wayne Reynolds, British artist
- Wayne Rhoden (born 1966), Jamaican-born American music producer, singer, songwriter, sound engineer, and video editor/director
- Wayne R. Rice (1885–1945), American politician
- Wayne Richards (born 1970), Australian professional rugby league footballer
- Wayne Richardson (born 1946), Australian VFL player
- Wayne Rigby (born 1973), British boxer
- Wayne Riley (born 1962), Australian professional golfer
- Wayne Ritter, American fellow convict of murderer John Louis Evans
- Wayne Rittmuller (born 1982), South African international lawn bowler
- Wayne Ritzema, Northumberland County cricketer in 2003
- Wayne Rivers (born 1942), Canadian NHL player
- Wayne Robbins (1914–1958), American fiction author
- Wayne Roberts (activist) (1944–2021), Canadian food policy analyst
- Wayne Roberts (bowls) (born 1989), South African lawn bowler
- Wayne Roberts (director), American film director
- Wayne Roberts (soccer) (born 1977), South African soccer player
- Wayne Robinson (1930–2015), American NFL player
- Wayne Robinson (basketball) (born 1958), American NBA player
- Wayne Robson (1946–2011), Canadian television-, stage-, voice-, and film actor
- Wayne Rogers (1933–2015), American actor
- Wayne Rollings (1941–2022), American marine
- Wayne "Tree" Rollins (born 1955), American NBA player
- Wayne Rooney (born 1985), English professional footballer and current manager
- Wayne Allyn Root (born 1961), American television and radio host, author, activist, political commentator, and conspiracy theorist
- Wayne M. Ropes (1898–1948), American politician and businessman
- Wayne Rosenthal (baseball) (born 1965), American MLB pitcher and pitching coach
- Wayne Rosenthal (politician), American politician
- Wayne Rosing (born 1946), American engineering manager
- Wayne Anthony Ross (born 1943), American attorney
- Wayne Rostad (born 1947), Canadian musician and television presenter
- Wayne Routledge (born 1985), English professional footballer
- Wayne Roycroft (born 1946), Australian equestrian and coach
- Wayne Ruediger (born 1976), Australian international lawn bowler
- Wayne Russell (born 1967), Welsh footballer
- Wayne Rutledge (1942–2004), Canadian NHL and WHA player
- Wayne Ryan (born 1996), British motorcycle racer
- Wayne Ryding, English Paralympic swimmer
- Wayne Sabin (1915–1989), American tennis player
- Wayne Sales (born 1949), Canadian business executive
- Wayne Sandilands (born 1983), South African professional soccer player
- Wayne Sanstead (born 1935), American politician
- Wayne Sappleton (born 1960), Jamaican NBA player
- Wayne Sasser (born 1950), American politician
- Wayne G. Sayles (born 1943), American numismatist and author
- Wayne Scargill (born 1968), English professional footballer
- Wayne Schaab (born 1948), Canadian AHL, CHL, and EHL player
- Wayne Schafer (born 1963), American barbecue pitmaster
- Wayne Schimmelbusch (born 1953), Australian VFL player
- Wayne Schmidt (born 1966), American politician
- Wayne Scholes, British businessman
- Wayne Schurr (born 1937), American MLB relief pitcher
- Wayne Schwass (born 1968), Australian VFL and AFL player
- Wayne Scot Lukas, American fashion consultant
- Wayne Scott Kermond, Australian musical theater performer
- Wayne Scott, American politician
- Wayne Seabrook (born 1961), Australian cricketer
- Wayne See (1923–2019), American NBA player
- Wayne Selden Jr. (born 1994), American PBA player
- Wayne Sermon (born 1984), American musician, songwriter, and record producer
- Wayne Sevier (1941–1999), American NFL coach
- Wayne Seybold (born 1963), American mayor and former Olympic pair skater
- Wayne Shand (born 1961), Australian VFL player
- Wayne Shanklin (1917–1970), American singer, songwriter, and producer
- Wayne Shannon (1948–2011), American television news reporter, political pundit, and humorist
- Wayne Sharrocks (born 1965), English author
- Wayne Shaw (footballer) (born 1972), English footballer
- Wayne Shaw (linebacker), Canadian football linebacker
- Wayne Shaw (politician), American politician
- Wayne Shaw (safety) (born 1974), Canadian football player
- Wayne G. Shear Jr. (born 1957), American Naval officer
- Wayne Sheley (1916–1989), Canadian football player
- Wayne Shelford (born 1957), birth name of New Zealand rugby union footballer and coach Buck Shelford
- Wayne Sherlock (born 1978), Irish hurler
- Wayne Shillington (born 1966), Australian swimmer
- Wayne Shorter (1933–2023), American jazz saxophonist, composer, and bandleader
- Wayne Sides (born 1948), American photographer, artist, and educator
- Wayne Siegel (born 1953), American-born Danish composer
- Wayne Siekman (born 1983), Australian AFLW coach
- Wayne Silby (born 1948), American social investor and entrepreneur
- Wayne Simien (born 1983), American NBA player
- Wayne Simmonds (born 1988), Canadian NHL player
- Wayne Simmons (disambiguation), several people
- Wayne Simonds (born 1966), Australian rugby league footballer
- Wayne Simoneau (1935–2017), American politician
- Wayne Simpson (born 1948), American MLB pitcher
- Wayne Simpson (ice hockey) (born 1989), American DEL player
- Wayne Sing (born 1968), Australian professional rugby league footballer
- Wayne Slattery (equestrian) (born 1970), Australian showjumper
- Wayne Slattery (footballer) (born 1960), Australian SANFL and VFL player
- Wayne Slawson (born 1932), American composer and professor
- Wayne Sleep (born 1948), British dancer, director, choreographer, and actor
- Wayne Small (born 1945), Canadian ice hockey player
- Wayne Smith (disambiguation), several people
- Wayne Snow Jr. (1936–2004), American politician
- Wayne Snyder, American computer scientist and associate professor
- Wayne Snyman (born 1985), South African race walker
- Wayne Sobers (born 1969), Barbadian international footballer
- Wayne Sorensen (born 1963), Canadian sport shooter
- Wayne Sousa, American biologist and ecologist
- Wayne Southwick (1923–2016), American surgeon and academic
- Wayne Souza (1958–1979), American football player
- Wayne Spitzer (born 1966), American author, artist, film director, producer, and screenwriter
- Wayne Spooner, Nottinghamshire cricket board player in 1999
- Wayne Springall (born 1956), Australian professional rugby league footballer
- Wayne Srhoj (born 1982), Australian footballer
- Wayne St. John, Canadian past member of jazz-funk band Ravin'
- Wayne Stahl, American politician
- Wayne Static (1965–2014), American musician
- Wayne Stayskal (1931–2018), American political cartoonist
- Wayne Stead (born 1973), New Zealand cricketer
- Wayne Steeves (born 1944), Canadian politician
- Wayne Steinhauer (born 1956), American businessman and politician
- Wayne Stenehjem (1953–2022), American lawyer and politician
- Wayne Stephenson (1945–2010), Canadian NHL player
- Wayne Stetina (born 1953), American cyclist
- Wayne Stetski (born 1952), Canadian politician
- Wayne Stevens (disambiguation), several people
- Wayne Stewart (American football) (1947–2020), American AFL and NFL player
- Wayne Stone, Canadian past member of pop rock group Motherlode (band)
- Wayne Sturge, Trinidad and Tobago politician
- Wayne Sulo Aho (1916–2006), American contactee
- Wayne Suttles (1918–2005), American anthropologist and linguist
- Wayne Sutton (1890–1976), American college football player and coach
- Wayne Swan (born 1954), Australian politician
- Wayne Swinny (died 2023), American past member of rock band Saliva (band)
- Wayne Taekata, Australian professional rugby league footballer
- Wayne Talkes (1952–2021), English professional footballer
- Wayne Tallon (born 1956), Canadian curler
- Wayne Kent Taylor (1955–2021), American businessman
- Wayne Taylor (born 1956), South African sports car racing driver and team owner
- Wayne Teasdale (1945–2004), American Catholic monk
- Wayne Tefs (1947–2014), Canadian novelist, writer, editor, critic, and anthologist
- Wayne Terwilliger (1925–2021), American MLB player
- Wayne Thiebaud (1920–2021), American painter
- Wayne Thom (born 1933), Chinese-born American international architectural photographer
- Wayne Thomas (disambiguation), several people
- Wayne B. Thomas (born 1969), American economist and professor
- Wayne Thompson (disambiguation), several people
- Wayne Thomson (born 1939), Canadian politician
- Wayne Thornborrow (born 1972), Australian AFL player
- Wayne Thornburg (1891–1980), American politician
- Wayne Thring (born 1963), South African teacher and politician
- Wayne Ting, American entrepreneur, investor, and business executive
- Wayne Tinkle (born 1966), American college basketball coach and former CBA and IBL player
- Wayne Tippit (1932–2009), American television and stage character actor
- Wayne Tolleson (born 1955), American MLB player
- Wayne Tosh (born 1947), Canadian football player
- Wayne Toups (born 1958), American Cajun singer
- Wayne Tribue (born 1990), American CAFL player
- Wayne Trimble (born 1944), American NFL player
- Wayne Trottier, American politician
- Wayne Truter (born 1965), South African cricketer
- Wayne Tuck Jr. (born 1976), Canadian curler
- Wayne Turley (born 1972), Australian international lawn and indoor bowler
- Wayne Turner (basketball) (born 1976), American professional basketball player
- Wayne Turner (footballer) (born 1961), English footballer & manager
- Wayne Twitchell (1948–2010), American MLB pitcher
- Wayne Tyrone (born 1950), American MLB player
- Wayne Ulugia (born 1992), New Zealand professional rugby league footballer
- Wayne W. Umbreit (1913–2007), American bacteriologist
- Wayne Underwood (1913–1967), American NFL player
- Wayne van As (born 1968), South African cricketer
- Wayne van der Bank (born 1997), South African MLR player
- Wayne Van Dorp (born 1961), Canadian NHL player
- Wayne van Heerden (born 1979), South African rugby union player
- Wayne Van Rooyen (born 1978), South African actor and voice artist
- Wayne Vaughn, American producer, keyboardist, and arranger
- Wayne Vaz (born 1994), Indian professional footballer
- Wayne Velicer (1944–2017), American psychologist
- Wayne Visser (born 1970), Zimbabwean-born English writer, speaker, film producer, academic, poetry editor, social entrepreneur, futurist, and environmentalist
- Wayne S. Vucinich (1913–2005), American historian
- Wayne Wade (born 1959), Jamaican singer, songwriter, and musician
- Wayne Wagner (1946–2022), American lawyer, state legislator, and mayor
- Wayne Walker (disambiguation), several people
- Wayne Wallace, New Zealand rugby league footballer and coach
- Wayne Wallingford (born 1946), American politician
- Wayne Walsh (born 1946), Australian VFL player
- Wayne Walton (born 1948), American NFL player
- Wayne Wang (born 1949), Hong Kong-born American director, producer, and screenwriter
- Wayne Wapeemukwa, Canadian film director, screenwriter, and teacher of Métis descent
- Wayne Ward (born 1964), English EFL player
- Wayne Warga (1938–1994), American author, journalist, and foreign correspondent
- Wayne Warren (born 1962), Welsh professional darts player
- Wayne B. Warrington Sr. (1923–1989), American military personnel and civil servant
- Wayne Watson (born 1954), American contemporary Christian music singer-songwriter
- Wayne Watson (sprinter) (born 1965), Jamaican athlete
- Wayne Weaver (born 1935), American businessman
- Wayne Webb (born 1957), American PBA and USBC player
- Wayne Weening (born 1965), Australian professional darts player
- Wayne Weidemann (born 1966), Australian AFL player
- Wayne Weiler (1934–2005), American racecar driver
- Wayne Wells (born 1946), American freestyle wrestler
- Wayne Wendt (born 1960), Australian politician
- Wayne Wesolowski, American builder of miniature models
- Wayne Westlake (1947–1984), American poet, journalist, activist, and translator of Chinese and Japanese works
- Wayne Westmark (born 1932), American politician
- Wayne Westner (1961–2017), South African golfer
- Wayne Wettlaufer (1943–2015), Canadian politician
- Wayne Wheeler (American football) (born 1950), American NFL player
- Wayne Wheeler (1869–1927), American attorney, teacher, political organizer, and lobbyist
- Wayne White (artist) (born 1957), American art director, painter, printmaker
- Wayne White (cricketer) (born 1985), English cricketer
- Wayne E. Whitlatch (1928–2017), American Air Force major general
- Wayne F. Whittow (born 1933), American politician
- Wayne Wiblin (born 1969), South African cricketer
- Wayne A. Wiegand (born 1946), American library historian, author, and academic
- Wayne Wigham (born 1958), Australian professional rugby league footballer
- Wayne Wilcox (born 1978), American actor and singer
- Wayne Wilderson (born 1966), American actor
- Wayne Wilkins, British record producer, songwriter, record engineer, and record mixer
- Wayne Willgress (born 1988), English lawn and indoor bowler
- Wayne William Howlett (born 1980), Australian powerlifter
- Wayne Williams (born 1958), American mass murderer
- Wayne Williams (American football) (1921–2001), American football player
- Wayne W. Williams (born 1963), American politician
- Wayne Wilson (American football) (1957–2024), American football player
- Wayne Wilson (ice hockey) (born 1963), Canadian ice hockey player and coach
- Wayne Wilson (weightlifter) (born 1949), Canadian weightlifter
- Wayne Winsley (born 1963), American motivational speaker, author, and broadcaster
- Wayne L. Winston (born 1950), American academic
- Wayne Winterrowd (1941–2010), American gardening expert and designer
- Wayne Wolf, American candidate in the 2008 Colorado House of Representatives elections
- Wayne Wolff (born 1938), American AFL player
- Wayne Wonder (born 1972), Jamaican reggae artist
- Wayne Wong (tennis) (born 1981), Hong Kong tennis player
- Wayne Wong (skier) (born 1950), Canadian pioneer of freestyle skiing
- Wayne Wood (1951–2019), Canadian WHA player
- Wayne W. Wood (born 1930), American politician
- Wayne Woodard (1914–1964), birth name of American artist and illustrator Hannes Bok
- Wayne Woodson (born 1949), American stage and film actor
- Wayne Worcester (born 1947), American journalist and author
- Wayne Wouters (born 1951), Canadian public servant
- Wayne D. Wright (1916–2003), American jockey
- Wayne P. Wright (born 1951), Bishop of Delaware
- Wayne Yates (1937–2022), American NBA player
- Wayne Yearwood (born 1964), Canadian professional and Olympic basketball player
- Wayne Yetman (born 1946), Canadian long-distance runner
- Wayne Yip (born 1981), British television director
- Wayne Yokoyama, American biologist and professor
- Wayne Youle (born 1974), New Zealand artist from Porirua
- Wayne Young (born 1952), American gymnast
- Wayne Zuk (born 1949), Canadian WHA, IHL, and SHL player

== Fictional characters ==
- Wayne Cramp, the protagonist of The Cramp Twins
- Wayne Duncan (Neighbours), in the soap opera Neighbours
- Wayne Hays (True Detective), in the crime drama True Detective
- Wayne Huevos, in Saturday Night Live
- Wayne Jarvis, in the sitcom Arrested Development
- Wayne Ladlow, in the soap opera EastEnders
- Wayne Molloy, in the soap opera Fair City
- Wayne Palmer, in the serial drama 24
- Wayne Patterson, in the soap opera Blue Heelers
- Wayne Rigsby, in the crime drama The Mentalist
- Wayne Szalinski, main character in the Honey I Shrunk the Kids trilogy
- Wayne Thompson (EastEnders), in the soap opera EastEnders
- Wayne Unser, in the TV series Sons of Anarchy and Mayans M.C.
