= Pete Ohler =

Canadian football player and art dealer (1940–2021)

No. 11
- Position: Quarterback

Personal information
- Born: December 29, 1940; Canada
- Died: June 7, 2021 (aged 80)
- Listed height: 6 ft 2 in (1.88 m)
- Listed weight: 200 lb (91 kg)

Career information
- High school: Vancouver (BC)
- College: Washington

Career history
- 1963–1964: BC Lions
- 1964: Winnipeg Blue Bombers
- 1964, 1967–1969: BC Lions

Awards and highlights
- Grey Cup champion (1964)

Career CFL statistics
- Passing comp: 115
- Passing att: 198
- Passing yards: 1,307
- Passing TDs: 4

Peter Ohler (December 29, 1940 – June 7, 2021) was a Canadian football quarterback, coach, and art dealer working primarily with Canadian historic art.

He played five seasons with the BC Lions of the Canadian Football League. Ohler attended Vancouver College for high school, playing basketball and football. Upon graduating, he first enrolled at Wenatchee Community College before transferring to the University of Washington. Ohler was also a member of the Winnipeg Blue Bombers. He was a member of the BC Lions team that won the 52nd Grey Cup.

== Professional football career ==
=== BC Lions ===
Following a successful run with the Washington Huskies while at the University of Washington, where he studied English with a focus on poetry, Ohler joined the BC Lions in 1963.

=== Winnipeg Blue Bombers ===
Ohler was picked in an equalization draft by the Winnipeg Blue Bombers in 1964 but retired.

=== BC Lions ===
The Winnipeg Blue Bombers traded Ohler to the BC Lions for Wayne Dennis and Ray Osbourne on October 1, 1964. The Lions advanced to the 52nd Grey Cup where they beat the Hamilton Tiger-Cats 34-24 on November 28, 1964. Ohler threw a touchdown pass in the game after recovering a botched field goal attempt.

Ohler did not play in 1965 and 1966 but signed with the Lions on May 5, 1967. He played with the Lions till 1969.

In his later life, Ohler had memory loss and migraines as a result of concussions suffered in his football career.

=== Coaching ===
In the 1980s, 1990s and 2000s, Peter Ohler gave his time as a coach of the Vancouver College Fighting Irish, and later the UBC Thunderbird quarterbacks.

== Art career ==
Peter Ohler opened a small bookshop in Richmond in the 1960s. After retiring from football, he opened an art gallery in Vancouver, beginning with a handful of paintings by the Group of Seven. In 1976, he moved to Calgary, Alberta, where he established Masters Gallery. Masters Gallery became a hub of art and culture in the city. Ohler focused on historical Canadian art but was always eager to give a platform to living artists. He worked closely with artists including Marion Nicoll, Jack Shadbolt, and Joane Cardinal-Schubert, and many others. He was known for building relationships with artists and clients, and for his genuine, abiding love for the art he handled.

In 1986, Ohler returned to Vancouver where he established a small gallery in Kerrisdale under the heading Peter Ohler Fine Art Ltd.. The move was driven largely by his search for effective treatment for severe cluster headaches. He worked closely with artists and other art dealers, including his best friend, Ken Heffel. Among the historical artists he championed was Laura Muntz Lyall. The book Laura Muntz Lyall: Impressions of Women and Children is dedicated to Peter Ohler as follows:

A published poet, he has shared his ardent and discriminating love of art with private and public collectors, becoming in the process one of the great dealers in Canada.

He operated his gallery until he retired in 2015.

== Personal life ==
Peter Ohler had three sons from his first marriage, and one daughter from his second marriage. He had four grandchildren. He loved the ocean and spent a great deal of time exploring BC’s coast on his own boat and at the Hakai Pass, a place where he not only enjoyed fishing but found much peace and poetry. Ohler also loved horses, and spent a great deal of time at the barns where he kept various horses over the years.

== Death ==
Ohler died on June 7, 2021, three days after being diagnosed with cancer at the age of 80.
