= Wayne Osborne =

Wayne Osborne may refer to:

- Wayne Osborne (baseball) (1912–1987), American baseball player
- Wayne Osborne (footballer) (born 1977), English former professional footballer
