= List of Sydney Roosters honours =

Below is a list of the titles that the Sydney Roosters have received since 1908.

== Major Titles ==
=== Premierships – 16 ===
Season	Opponent	Score
1911	Glebe	11 – 8
1912	No Opponent	–
1913	No Opponent	–
1923	South Sydney	15 – 12
1935	South Sydney	19 – 3
1936	Balmain	32 – 12
1937	No Opponent	–
1940	Canterbury-Bankstown	24 – 14
1945	Balmain	22 – 18
1974	Canterbury-Bankstown	19 – 4
1975	St. George Dragons	38 – 0
2002	New Zealand Warriors	30 – 8
2013	Manly-Warringah Sea Eagles	26 – 18
2018	Melbourne Storm	21 – 6
2019	Canberra Raiders	14 - 8
2026	Newcastle Knights	19 - 18

=== Runners-up – 15 ===
Season	Opponent	Score
1908	South Sydney	12 – 14
1919	No Opponent	–
1921	No Opponent	–
1928	South Sydney	5 – 26
1931	South Sydney	7 – 12
1934	Western Suburbs	12 – 15
1938	Canterbury-Bankstown	6 – 19
1941	St. George	14 – 31
1960	St. George	6 – 31
1972	Manly-Warringah	14 – 19
1980	Canterbury-Bankstown Bulldogs	4 – 18
2000	Brisbane Broncos	6 – 14
2003	Penrith Panthers	6 – 18
2004	Bulldogs	13 – 16
2010	St. George Illawarra Dragons	8 – 32

=== Minor Premierships – 20 ===
Season	Competition	Wins
1912	NSWRFL	13
1913	NSWRFL	12
1923	NSWRFL	13
1931	NSWRFL	12
1934	NSWRFL	12
1935	NSWRFL	15
1936	NSWRFL	11
1937	NSWRFL	6
1940	NSWRFL	9
1941	NSWRFL	9
1945	NSWRFL	11
1974	NSWRFL	19
1975	NSWRFL	20
1980	NSWRFL	14
1981	NSWRFL	16
2004	NRL	19
2013	NRL	18
2014	NRL	16
2015	NRL	18
2018	NRL	16

=== World Club Challenge – 5 ===
Year	Opponent	Score
1976	St Helens R.F.C.	25 – 2
2003	St Helens R.F.C.	38 – 0
2014	Wigan Warriors	36 – 14
2019	Wigan Warriors	20 – 8
2020	St Helens R.F.C	20 - 12

=== NRLW Premierships – 2 ===
Season	Opponent	Score
2021	St. George Illawarra Dragons	16 - 4

= = =
Season	Opponent	Score
2024	Cronulla Sharks	32-28

=== NRLW Runners-up – 3 ===
Season	Opponent	Score
2018	Brisbane Broncos	34 – 12
2020	Brisbane Broncos	20 – 10
2025	Brisbane Broncos	22 – 18

=== NRLW Minor Premierships – 3 ===
Season	Wins
2022	5
2025	11
2026	11

== Youth/Friendly Titles ==
Club Championship – 13
1930, 1931, 1934, 1935, 1936, 1937, 1945, 1970, 1974, 1975, 2004, 2013, 2014

Reserve Grade – 9
1908, 1909, 1910, 1911, 1935, 1937, 1949, 1986, 2004

Third Grade/Under 23 – 11
1914, 1917, 1924, 1929, 1930, 1931, 1932, 1941, 1947, 1970, 1976

National Youth Competition – 1
2016

Jersey Flegg Cup – 3
1995, 2002, 2004

Presidents Cup – 16
1910, 1911, 1913, 1915, 1920, 1922, 1923, 1924, 1927, 1938, 1948, 1949, 1955, 1978, 1987, 1993

S. G. Ball Cup – 4
1997, 2008, 2010, 2014

Amco Cup – 2
1975, 1978

City Cup – 3
1914, 1915, 1916

Pre-Season Cup – 4
1974, 1977, 1979, 1981

Auckland Nines – 1
2017

World Sevens – 1
1993

== Individual Titles ==
=== Hall of Fame ===
Year	Inductees
2010	Arthur Beetson, Brad Fittler, Dally Messenger, Dave Brown, Jack Gibson
2012	Dick Dunn, Kevin Hastings, Ray Stehr, Ron Coote
2023	Arthur Halloway, Sandy Pearce, Joe Pearce, John Brass, Craig Fitzgibbon, Anthony Minichiello

=== Player of the Year ===
Season	Winner
1986	Brendan Hall
1987	David Trewhella
1988	Kurt Sherlock
1989	Trevor Gillmeister
1990	Hugh McGahan
1991	Wayne Marshall
1992	Gary Freeman
1993	Nigel Gaffey
1994	Jason Lowrie

=== Jack Gibson Medal ===
Season	Winner
1995	Jason Lowrie
1996	Terry Hermansson
1997	Luke Ricketson
1998	Brad Fittler
1999	Bryan Fletcher
2000	Brad Fittler
2001	Craig Fitzgibbon
2002	Craig Fitzgibbon
2003	Adrian Morley
2004	Brett Finch
2005	Ryan Cross
2006	Craig Fitzgibbon
2007	Braith Anasta
2008	Mitchell Pearce
2009	Craig Fitzgibbon
2010	Mitchell Pearce
2011	Jake Friend
2012	Jared Waerea-Hargreaves
2013	Sonny Bill Williams
2014	Mitchell Pearce
2015	Boyd Cordner
2016	Jake Friend
2017	Boyd Cordner
2018	James Tedesco
2019	James Tedesco
2020	James Tedesco
2021	James Tedesco
2022	James Tedesco
2023	Lindsay Collins
2024	James Tedesco
2025	James Tedesco

=== Rothmans Medal ===
Season	Winner
1970	Kevin Junee
1981	Kevin Hastings
1983	Michael Eden

=== Provan-Summons Medal ===
Season	Winner
1997	Brad Fittler

=== Dally M Medal ===
Season	Winner
1992	Gary Freeman
2010	Todd Carney
2019	James Tedesco
2025	James Tedesco

=== Dally M Fullback of the Year ===
Season	Winner
1993	Rod Silva
2004	Anthony Minichiello
2015	Roger Tuivasa-Sheck
2019	James Tedesco
2022	James Tedesco
2024	James Tedesco
2025	James Tedesco

=== Dally M Winger of the Year ===
Season	Winner
1981	Terry Fahey
1985	John Ferguson
1987	Steve Morris
2013	Roger Tuivasa-Sheck
2018	Blake Ferguson
2022	Joseph Sua'ali'i
2025	Mark Nawaqanitawase

=== Dally M Centre of the Year ===
Season	Winner
2019	Latrell Mitchell
2022	Joseph Manu

=== Dally M Five-Eighth of the Year ===
Season	Winner
1998	Brad Fittler
1999	Brad Fittler
2002	Brad Fittler
2010	Todd Carney

=== Dally M Halfback of the Year ===
Season	Winner
1980	Kevin Hastings
1981	Kevin Hastings
1982	Kevin Hastings
1992	Gary Freeman
2004	Brett Finch

=== Dally M Prop of the Year ===
Season	Winner
1991	Craig Salvatori

=== Dally M Hooker of the Year ===
Season	Winner
1980	John Lang
1981	Jeff Masterman

=== Dally M Second-Rower of the Year ===
Season	Winner
1987	Hugh McGahan
2013	Boyd Cordner
2024	Angus Crichton

=== Dally M Rookie of the Year ===
Season	Winner
1981	Jeff Masterman
2021	Sam Walker
2025	Robert Toia

=== Dally M Captain of the Year ===
Season	Winner
1980	Royce Ayliffe
1999	Brad Fittler
2010	Braith Anasta
2021	James Tedesco
2025	James Tedesco

=== Dally M Coach of the Year ===
Season	Winner
1981	Bob Fulton
2010	Brian Smith
2013	Trent Robinson

=== Clive Churchill Medal ===
Season	Winner
1974	Arthur Beetson (Retrospective)
1975	Ian Schubert (Retrospective)
2002	Craig Fitzgibbon
2018	Luke Keary
