= Perryman =

Perryman is a surname. Notable people with the name include:

- Bob Perryman (born 1964), American football player
- Chief Perryman, tribal chief of the Muscogee people
- Denzel Perryman, American football player
- Jill Perryman (born 1933), Australian actress and singer
- Jordan Perryman (born 1999), American football player
- Lou Perryman (1941–2009), American character actor
- Margot Perryman (born 1938), British artist
- Michael Perryman, British astronomer, known for his work leading the Hipparcos and Gaia space astrometric projects
- Parson Perryman (1888–1966), baseball player
- Ryan Perryman (born 1976), American basketball player
- Stephen Perryman (born 1955), English cricketer
- Steve Perryman (born 1951), English football player
- Wayne Perryman, American Christian leader
- Willie Perryman (1911–1985), American blues piano player, better known as Piano Red and Dr Feelgood

Given name

- Matthew Perryman Jones (born 1973), American singer-songwriter

== See also ==
- 10969 Perryman, an asteroid
- Borders Buses, bus operating company based in Scotland formerly known as Perryman's Buses
- Perryman, Maryland, census-designated place in Harford County, Maryland, USA
