= Cox Sports =

Former regional sports network in New England

- Country: United States
- Broadcast area: Rhode Island; Connecticut; Massachusetts

Programming
- Language: American English

Ownership
- Owner: Cox Communications

History
- Launched: 30 September 2004
- Closed: 2 May 2012
- Replaced by: Ocean State Networks

Cox Sports was a regional sports network that served the United States New England region until 2012. Cox Sports New England served as the local programming outlet for Cox Communications, the cable service provider in Rhode Island and parts of Connecticut.

Cox Sports New England focused primarily on local high school and college sports, including Providence College Friars and UConn Huskies of the Big East Conference and University of Rhode Island Rams of the Atlantic 10 Conference. Other college teams covered included: Central Connecticut State University, Rhode Island College, Bryant University and more.

Professional teams included: Pawtucket Red Sox, New England Revolution and Boston Cannons.

== Programs ==
Cox Sports provided an extensive look at high school sports, broadcasting over 40 high school games annually. In addition, Cox Sports featured Varsity Life, a show co-produced with WJAR focusing on highlights and issues of relevance to high school student athletes. Cox Sports also hosted the RI Sports Awards every June in Providence.

Cox Sports had also teamed up with Eric Scott Latek of Phantazma Pictures to produce two original documentary series. In 2007, they began producing an original documentary series, 3 degrees, which garnered two Telly Awards for Best Series and Best Cinematography. The show focuses on the struggle of 4 different local martial artists as they balance life inside and outside the ring. It returned for a second season of six episodes in 2009. The 2009 winter season also premiered Xposé, an eight show series featuring the people on the frontlines, goal lines and side lines in local traditional and adventure sports throughout Rhode Island. Featured episodes include Darren Rizzi's (now an assistant coach for the Miami Dolphins) first and only season as head coach of the University of Rhode Island Football Team, The Women of Providence Roller Derby, the New England Collegiate Baseball League's Newport Gulls, the Rhode Island National Guard and "Driven," which highlights the attempt of two local businessmen to create a custom car business in Rhode Island that focuses on fundraising for charity and community involvement.

Also broadcast on Cox Sports were ESPN Plus college football and basketball games, CFL football, coaches' shows for the many teams, outdoors programming, ESPNEWS, and other select events and shows.

Cox Sports also simulcasted the 10 p.m. newscast from Boston CW affiliate WLVI, which is produced by WHDH. This was the only access via cable to a Boston newscast available in Rhode Island; its addition to the network in January 2001 (when the network was programmed as a general cable access channel branded simply as Cox 3) came after Cox dropped WBZ-TV from its systems. Even though the network relaunched as a regional sports network on September 30, 2004 and the production of the newscast shifted from WLVI itself to WHDH in December 2006, the arrangement had continued.

NESN+ was shown on Cox Sports when the Boston Red Sox and Boston Bruins were playing simultaneously.

On May 2, 2012, Cox and WJAR launched Ocean State Networks (OSN). As a result, Cox Sports was taken off the air and all of its programming was moved to the new network (excluding ESPNEWS and WLVI's 10 p.m. newscast). OSN also airs WJAR newscasts throughout the day and night. The network replaces NewsChannel 5 (formerly the Rhode Island News Channel), operated by Cox and WLNE November 30, 1998 until February 1, 2012. Today, Cox Sports continues to operate as a production arm of OSN and produces live sports broadcasts and original programming for the channel.

== Personalities ==
- Dan Hoard - Pawtucket Red Sox play by play
- Bob Montgomery - Pawtucket Red Sox color commentator
- Brad Feldman - New England Revolution play by play
- Greg Lalas - New England Revolution color commentator
- Jason Chandler - Boston Cannons play-by-play
- Jack Piatelli - Boston Cannons color commentator
- Don Orsillo - Providence Friars basketball play by play
- Ron Perry - Providence Friars basketball color analyst
- Scott Cordischi - High School football play by play
- Mike Wahl - High School football color commentator
- Mark Brown - UCONN football play by play
- Mark Didio - UCONN football color commentator
- Joe D’Ambrosio - UCONN baseball play by play
- Andy Baylock - UCONN baseball color commentator
- Wayne Norman - UCONN softball play by play
- Doris Yon - UCONN softball color commentator
- Chris Kelly - UCONN football sideline reporter
- Shawna Hassett - "Inside Friartown" host
- Don Coyne- URI Rams play by play
- Abu Bakr- URI Rams color analyst
- Frank Carpano- Varsity Life host
