= Cusic =

Cusic is a surname. Notable people with the surname include:

- Don Cusic (born c. 1955), American author, songwriter and record producer
- Eddie Cusic (1926–2015), American Mississippi blues guitarist, singer, and songwriter
- Marshall E. Cusic Jr. (born 1943), retired Rear Admiral in the United States Navy Reserve
- Wayne Cusic (1905–1993), American college football and basketball player and coach
