= Bentson =

Bentson is a surname. Notable people with the surname include:

- Kahukura Bentson (born 1978), New Zealand boxer
- Wayne Bentson, American businessman

== See also ==
- Bengtson
- Benson (surname)
- Bentzon
