= Charles Judd =

Charles Judd may refer to:

- Charles Hastings Judd (1835–1890), Hawaiian politician and chamberlain
- Charles Hubbard Judd (1873–1946), American educational psychologist
- Charles Judd (politician) (1900–1973), member of the Wisconsin State Assembly
- Charles M. Judd, American psychologist
- Charles Judd (missionary) (1842–1919), British Protestant missionary to China
