= Wesolowski =

Wesolowski is a surname. Notable people with the surname include:

- Fred Wesolowski, Canadian politician
- Józef Wesołowski (1948–2015), defrocked Roman Catholic Archbishop and apostolic nuncio
- Jakub Wesołowski, Polish actor and journalist
- James Wesolowski (born 1987), Australian footballer
- Wayne Wesolowski, builder of miniature models
