= Haylen =

Haylen is a surname. Notable people with the surname include:

- Jo Haylen (born 1980/1981), Australian politician
- Les Haylen (1898–1977), Australian politician, playwright, novelist, and journalist
- Wayne Haylen, Australian judge
