= Wayne Davis =

Wayne Davis may refer to:

- Wayne Adrian Davis, a member of the World Scout Committee
- Wayne A. Davis (philosopher) (born 1951), American philosopher
- Wayne Davis (cornerback) (1963–2008), American football cornerback
- Wayne Davis (athlete) (born 1991), American then Trinidadian hurdler
- Wayne Davis (linebacker) (born 1964), American football linebacker
- Wayne Davis, a character on the TV series Desperate Housewives

== See also ==
- Wayne Davies (disambiguation)
