= Wayne Lewis =

Wayne Lewis may refer to:

- Wayne Lewis (bowls) (born 1951/1952), Australian Paralympic lawn bowler
- Wayne Lewis (cricketer) (born 1962), Jamaican cricketer
- Wayne D. Lewis Jr., American academic administrator
- Wayne Lewis (died 2025), singer and founder member of the R&B band Atlantic Starr
