= Charles M. Judd =

American social psychologist

- Education: Yale University (B.A., 1968); Columbia University (M.A., 1974; M.Phil., 1975; Ph.D., 1976)
- Known for: Data analysis Attitude measurement Intergroup relations
- Awards: 2010 Thomas M. Ostrom Award for Lifetime Contributions to Social Cognition Theory and Research from the International Social Cognition Network (with Gary McClelland) 2012 Jacob Cohen Award for Distinguished Contributions to Teaching and Mentoring from the American Psychological Association
- Scientific career
- Fields: Social psychology
- Institutions: University of Colorado Boulder
- Thesis: The effects of conflict resolution processes upon the structure of cognitions (1976)
- Website: psych.colorado.edu/~cjudd/

Charles M. Judd is an American social psychologist who is a College Professor of Distinction Emeritus at the University of Colorado Boulder. He is the co-author with David A. Kenny of Estimating the Effects of Social Interventions (Cambridge University Press, 1981).
