= Wayne Davies =

Wayne Davies may refer to:

- Wayne Davies (football manager), for Port Talbot Town F.C.
- Wayne Davies (real tennis), see Grand Slam (real tennis)

== See also ==
- Wayne Davis (disambiguation)
