= Preachers of L.A. =

- Also known as: Pastors of L.A.
- Genre: Reality television
- Starring: Clarence McClendon; Deitrick Haddon; Jay Haizlip; Noel Jones; Ron Gibson; Wayne Chaney Jr.
- Country of origin: United States
- Original language: English
- No. of seasons: 2
- No. of episodes: 22

Production
- Executive producer: Lemuel Plummer
- Camera setup: Multiple
- Running time: 42 minutes
- Production companies: L. Plummer Media; Relevé Entertainment

Original release
- Network: Oxygen
- Release: October 9, 2013 – November 19, 2014

Related
- Preachers of Detroit; Preachers of Atlanta

Preachers of L.A. is an American reality television series that premiered October 9, 2013, on Oxygen. Preachers of L.A. chronicles the lives of three bishops and three pastors from their work within the church to their personal lives at home. The preachers are adherents of prosperity theology, an offshoot of Pentecostalism. The series also encompasses the spouses of the men.

In January 2014, Oxygen renewed the series for a second season with the original cast returning. It was announced that a spin-off titled Preachers of Detroit would debut on Oxygen in late 2015, with potential spin-offs in New York City, Atlanta and Dallas.

== Cast ==
- Pastor Wayne Chaney Jr.
- Pastor Deitrick Haddon
- Pastor Jay Haizlip is a professional skateboarder, pastor, and reality television personality. He is married to Christy Haizlip, and the couple have two sons and a daughter together. The couple are featured on the Oxygen reality television series Preachers of L.A. Haizlip was a drug user in his earlier years, but is now a pastor at The Sanctuary, a megachurch located in Costa Mesa, California.
- Bishop Ron Gibson
- Bishop Noel Jones
- Bishop Clarence McClendon

== Episodes ==
=== Series overview ===
Season	Episodes	Originally released	
Season	Episodes	First released	Last released
1	8	October 9, 2013	November 27, 2013
2	14	August 20, 2014	November 19, 2014

=== Season 1 (2013) ===
No. overall	No. in season	Title	Original release date	US viewers (millions)
1	1	"Comeback"	October 9, 2013	1.07
2	2	"Acceptance"	October 16, 2013	1.01
3	3	"Tea & Sympathy"	October 23, 2013	1.02
4	4	"Family First"	October 30, 2013	1.01
5	5	"Perspective & Priorities"	November 6, 2013	1.02
6	6	"Staying True to You"	November 13, 2013	1.01
7	7	"Mending Hearts"	November 20, 2013	1.01
8	8	"Love Unites"	November 27, 2013	0.92

=== Season 2 (2014) ===
No. overall	No. in season	Title	Original release date	US viewers (millions)
9	1	"Judge Not"	August 20, 2014	N/A
10	2	"Truth Be Told"	August 27, 2014	N/A
11	3	"Fallen Angels"	September 3, 2014	N/A
12	4	"Honor Thy Father and Mother"	September 10, 2014	N/A
13	5	"Prodigal Son"	September 17, 2014	N/A
14	6	"Sins of the Father"	September 24, 2014	N/A
15	7	"Restoration"	October 1, 2014	N/A
16	8	"My Brother's Keeper"	October 8, 2014	N/A
17	9	"Meet the Godparents"	October 15, 2014	N/A
18	10	"Bouncing Back"	October 22, 2014	N/A
19	11	"The Apology"	October 29, 2014	N/A
20	12	"Increase the Peace"	November 5, 2014	N/A
21	13	"Sweet Home Alabama"	November 12, 2014	N/A
22	14	"pReach LA"	November 19, 2014	N/A
