= Wayne Osgood =

American criminologist

D. Wayne Osgood
- Born: Donald Wayne Osgood
- Education: University of California, Los Angeles (A.B., 1971); University of Colorado, Boulder (M.A., 1974; Ph.D., 1977)
- Known for: Work on delinquency among adolescents and its relationship to their friendship networks
- Awards: Fellow of the American Society of Criminology since 2005
- Scientific career
- Fields: Criminology
- Institutions: Pennsylvania State University
- Thesis: A comparison of cognitive style in impression formation and in existing views about people (1977)
- Doctoral advisor: Gary McClelland

Donald Wayne Osgood is an American criminologist and professor emeritus of criminology and sociology at Pennsylvania State University.

He has been a fellow of the American Society of Criminology since 2005, and he was the lead editor of their official journal, Criminology, from 2011 through 2017. He is also a Life Member of Clare Hall, Cambridge, since 2011.
