= Wayne Marshall =

Wayne Marshall may refer to:

- Wayne Marshall (classical musician) (born 1961), English pianist, organist and conductor
- Wayne Marshall (deejay) (born 1980), Jamaican dancehall musician
- Wayne Marshall (singer) (born 1968), now known as Marshayne, English R&B singer
- Wayne Marshall (ethnomusicologist), American scholar focusing on the musical and cultural production of the Caribbean and the Americas
- Wayne Marshall (basketball) (born 1986), American basketball player
- Wayne Marshall (rugby league) (born 1963), Australian rugby league player

== See also ==
- Marshall Wayne (1912–1999), American diver
