= Clarence McClendon =

American gospel musician (born 1965)

- Also known as: Bishop Clarence E. McClendon
- Born: Clarence E. McClendon; June 7, 1965 (age 61); Decatur, Illinois
- Origin: Los Angeles, California
- Genres: gospel, traditional black gospel, urban contemporary gospel
- Occupations: Singer, songwriter
- Instruments: vocals, singer-songwriter
- Years active: 2000–present
- Label: Integrity
- Website: bishopmcclendon.com

Clarence E. McClendon (born June 7, 1965) is an American gospel musician, who is the pastor of Full Harvest International Church located in Los Angeles, California, and is the director of Harvest Fire Mega Mass Choir. He started his music career in 2000, with the release of Shout Hallelujah, by Integrity Music. This album would chart on the Billboard Gospel Albums chart.

== Early life ==
McClendon was born in Decatur, Illinois, on June 7, 1965, which he started preaching and leading church at just 15 years old.

He relocated to Los Angeles in 1991 to become the pastor of West Adams Foursquare Church, which he rebranded the church Church of the Harvest in 1995. He commenced being a televangelist during 1997.

== Television ==
He appeared on Preachers of L.A. a program that aired on Oxygen from 2013 to 2014.

== Music career ==
His music career commenced in 2000, with the album Shout Hallelujah, that released on April 18, 2000, by Integrity Music. This placed at the No. 9 position on the Billboard Gospel Albums chart, and it was on that chart for 24 weeks. He is the conductor of Harvest Fire Mega Mass Choir.

== Personal life ==
Bishop McClendon was married to Tammera McClendon, but they divorced after 16 years of marriage, which in turn, ended his record deal with Integrity Music. He is presently married to Priscilla McClendon (née Delgado).

== Discography ==
List of selected studio albums, with selected chart positions
Title	Album details	Peak chart positions
Title	Album details	US Gos
Shout Hallelujah	Released: April 18, 2000; Label: Integrity; CD, digital download	9
