= Bentzon =

Bentzon is a surname. Notable people with the surname include:

- Jørgen Bentzon (1897–1951), Danish composer
- Niels Viggo Bentzon (1919–2000), Danish composer and pianist
- Peter Bentzon (c. 1783–c. 1850), Danish West Indies-born American master silversmith
- Thérèse Bentzon (Marie Thérèse Blanc, 1840–1907), French writer

== See also ==
- Bentson
