= Wayne Morgan =

Wayne Morgan may refer to:

- Wayne Morgan (basketball) (born 1950), American men's basketball coach
- Wayne Morgan (cricketer) (born 1955), Australian cricketer
