= Wayne Simmons =

Wayne Simmons is the name of:

- Wayne Simmons (commentator) (born 1953/1954), American Fox News commentator and fraudster
- Wayne Simmons (politician), Canadian political candidate, 2003
- Wayne Simmons (American football) (1969–2002), American NFL player

== See also ==
- Wayne Simmonds (born 1988), Canadian NHL player
- Wayne Simonds (born 1966), Australian former rugby league footballer
