= Wayne Johnson =

Wayne Johnson may refer to:

- Wayne Johnson (musician) (born 1949), American jazz and acoustic guitarist
- Wayne Johnson (Minnesota politician), American politician in Minnesota
- Wayne Johnson (New Mexico politician), American politician in New Mexico
- Wayne Johnson (Wyoming politician) (1942–2020), American politician in Wyoming
- Wayne Johnson (runner) (1902–1982), American long-distance runner

== See also ==
- Dewayne Johnson, plaintiff in Johnson v. Monsanto Co.
- Dwayne Johnson, American actor and professional wrestler
