= Wayne Chaney Jr. =

American pastor, radio show host, and television personality

Personal details
- Born: Wayne Chaney Jr.
- Children: 3
- Occupation: Pastor, Author, Entrepreneur, Radio, TV personality

Wayne Chaney Jr. is an American pastor, radio show host, and television personality. He is the senior pastor of the Antioch Church of Long Beach in Long Beach, California. The church was founded by his grandfather.

In October 2013, Chaney appeared on the Oxygen network show Preachers of L.A., which followed various heads of churches through their personal and spiritual lives. He and Myesha Chaney are the co-hosts of the talk radio show Real Life with the Chaney's on Stevie Wonder's KJLH.

He is the co-founder of the Long Beach Gospel Fest, which has over 20,000 attendees.

== Personal life ==
Chaney is the grandson of Dr. T.M. Chambers Sr. and of Rev. Joe Chaney Jr. He has three children.

He attended Morehouse College, Luther Rice College & Seminary, Fuller Seminary, Claremont School of Theology, and Duke Divinity School.

== Film and TV appearances ==
Chaney was featured on the Oxygen network series Preachers of L.A. According to The Christian Post, the Chaneys wanted to represent "a Godly marriage on television. A number of controversies arose around his affluent lifestyle and comments surrounding sexuality.

Chaney has also appeared on Extra, Access Hollywood, Showbiz Tonight, The Arsenio Hall Show, The Real, The Insider, The Boris & Nicole Show, Lift Every Voice and News One Now with Roland Martin.

== Bibliography ==
- Your Miraculous Potential: Maximizing God's Creativity, Power and Direction. (2016) ISBN 978-1-62911-695-2

== Honors and awards ==
Chaney received the 2010 Martin Luther King Jr. Peace Maker Award from the city of Long Beach.

President of the California National African American Network
Board Member of the National African American Network
Executive Board of Global Tribe International
Church Executive Magazine's Cover Story 2009
The Long Beach Post's 10 Most Powerful 2010 and 2011
100 Black Men's Faith Leader of the Year
Delta Sigma Theta's Leader of the Year,
President Emeritus of the Long Beach Ministers' Alliance
