= Wayne Morgan (cricketer) =

Australian cricketer (born 1955)

Personal information
- Born: 10 July 1955 (age 71); Greenslopes, Queensland, Australia
- Source: Cricinfo, 5 October 2020

Wayne Morgan (born 10 July 1955) is an Australian cricketer. He played in five first-class matches for Queensland between 1979 and 1981.

== See also ==
- List of Queensland first-class cricketers
