= Wayne Clark =

Wayne Clark may refer to:

- Wayne Clark (cricketer) (born 1953), former Australian cricketer
- Wayne Clark (quarterback) (born 1947), former American football quarterback
- Wayne Clark (American football end) (1918–1955), American football player
- Wayne Clark (politician), member of West Virginia's legislature

== See also ==
- Wayne Clarke (disambiguation)
