= Wayne Pratt =

English footballer

Personal information
- Date of birth: 1 March 1960 (age 66)
- Place of birth: Southampton, England
- Height: 5 ft 8 in (1.73 m)
- Position: Midfielder

Youth career
- Price's College
- 1976–1978: Southampton

Senior career*
Years	Team	Apps	(Gls)
1978–1981	Southampton	1	(0)
1981–1982	Waterlooville		
1982	Mein Munkfors		
1982–1984	Waterlooville		
1984–1985	Gosport Borough		
1985–1987	Andover		
1987	Road-Sea Southampton		
- * Club domestic league appearances and goals

Wayne Pratt (born 1 March 1960) is an English retired professional footballer who played as a midfielder. Born in Southampton, Pratt began his career with Southampton in 1978, and later played for local clubs including Waterlooville and Gosport Borough.

== Career ==
Wayne Pratt initially joined the Southampton F.C. Academy as an apprentice in July 1976 at the age of 16, before signing professional terms in March 1978. He made his first and only appearance for the club on 22 November 1980 in a Football League First Division match against Leeds United, as a replacement for the injured Steve Williams. He did not return the following week, when he himself was replaced by the debuting Reuben Agboola. During the 1980–81 season Pratt also captained the Southampton Reserves, playing in 31 of the side's games in the Football Combination that year and scoring one goal, against Arsenal.

After leaving Southampton in 1981, Pratt played for a number of clubs in Hampshire, including two spells at Waterlooville, a season with Gosport Borough and two years at Andover. In 1982, he also briefly played for Swedish club Mein Munkfors, as well as having a trial at Reading in October. In 1987 the midfielder played for Road-Sea Southampton in their final season before dissolution, and he later spent time at Weymouth, Poole Town and Netley Central Sports. As of 2013 Pratt was the director of Southampton & District Tyro League side Sarisbury Sparks, as well as working in the building trade in the Locks Heath area.

== Bibliography ==
- Chalk, Gary; Holley, Duncan; Bull, David (2013), All the Saints: A Complete Players' Who's Who of Southampton FC, Hagiology Publishing, ISBN 978-0992686406
- Holley, Duncan; Chalk, Gary; Bull, David (2003), In That Number: A Post-War Chronicle of Southampton FC, Hagiology Publishing, ISBN 978-0953447435
