= Wayne Mills =

Wayne Mills may refer to:

- Wayne Mills (British Army soldier) (20th century), British Army Corporal in the Bosnian War
- Wayne Mills (singer) (1969–2013), American country musician
