= Wayne Westlake =

Hawaiian poet, journalist and activist

Wayne Kaumualiʻi (Note: Sometimes written with and without the ‘okina.) Westlake
- Born: 1947; Lahaina, Maui, Hawaii
- Died: 1984 (aged 36); Hilo, Hawaii
- Education: Punahou School; University of Oregon; University of Hawaiʻi at Mānoa
- Occupations: Poet, journalist, activist, translator
- Partner: Mei-Li M. Siy

Wayne Kaumualiʻi Westlake (1947–1984) was a Native Hawaiian poet, translator, journalist, educator, and activist. His poetry often uses modernist techniques, combining Japanese haiku and Chinese ideograms alongside Hawaiian pidgin and references to Native Hawaiian culture. His poems also critique colonialism and United States imperialism in Hawai'i.

Westlake's death at the age of 36, following a car accident, left much of his work unpublished. The posthumous project Westlake: Poems edited by his friend and collaborator Richard Hamasaki, and Westlake's partner, Mei-Li M. Siy, compiled nearly 200 of his poems.

== Early life and education ==
Westlake was born in Lahaina, Maui, and grew up in Aina Haina, Oahu. He was of English, Danish, German, Norwegian, Swedish, and Native Hawaiian ancestry.

He graduated from Punahou School in 1966. He went on to study at the University of Oregon. He dropped out of college in 1969 and continued to learn on his own.

Drafted for the Vietnam War in the 60's, Westlake flew home and locked himself in his room with his typewriter and no food or water for three days as a means of protest. He managed to evade the war and resumed his studies at the University of Hawaiʻi at Manoa in 1972, working part-time as a janitor and eventually earning his B.A. in Chinese studies.

== Career ==
Westlake began his publishing career in 1974 with translations of the T'ang dynasty hermit poet Han Shan, which appeared in the alternative literary journal Tantalus, edited by Robert Lamansky. These translations were followed a year later by the publication of eleven additional Han Shan poems in Poetry East-West.

His 1975 contributions to Poetry East-West featured three original poems titled "The Archer," "The Black Dog," and "The Drunken Sage." "The Black Dog" was a reference to the poet, Michael Among. The same 1975 publication featured Westlake's translations of Japanese haiku poet Kobayashi Issa, collectively titled "This Hellish World (Versions from the Japanese)..."

From 1976 to 1984, Westlake co-edited the literary journal Seaweeds and Constructions with Richard Hamasaki to promote literature reflecting the social and political realities of Oceania.

The artwork HULI is a 1979 print by Westlake. The piece consists of four letters hand-stamped in black ink on paper to present the Hawaiian word huli in reverse. The work literalizes the word huli, which means to turn, search for, or flip. The word was a grassroots rallying call during the 1970s cultural reawakening and push for self-determination in Hawaiʻi.

As a journalist, he freelanced, publishing articles and editorials for local newspapers. He became more involved with activism around land and the environment following his move from Oahu to Hawaiʻi Island in 1981.

He was opposed United States attempts to control Hawaiʻi and became involved with the anti-bombing protests for Kahoolawe following the disappearance of George Helm, publishing poems and editorials in the protesters' defense. During the year Helm and Mitchell disappeared, Westlake began working as a freelance journalist for the Hawaii Observer, a bi-monthly news magazine that has since closed. In November 1977, the publication featured a cover story consisting of Westlake's candid interview with Richard Sawyer and Walter Ritte, Jr., who were imprisoned following a thirty-five day occupation of an island. He was awarded first place for his letters to the editor in 1983.

In 1980, Westlake took on a co-teaching role at the University of Hawaii's Ethnic Studies Program course on local creative literature and social movements. He was also a teacher through the Hawaiʻi Poets in the Schools Program on Maui.

== Editorial projects ==
From 1976 to 1984, Westlake co-edited the literary journal Seaweeds and Constructions with Richard Hamasaki to promote contemporary literature from Oceania. The publication concluded after Westlake passed away in 1984. In 1980, he collaborated with editors from the Fiji-based magazine Mana and the South Pacific Creative Arts Society to produce a special Hawaiʻi edition. This partnership led to the publication of A Pacific Islands Collection in 1983 as the seventh issue of Seaweeds and Constructions, marking the first United States-published anthology dedicated to contemporary South Pacific writers.

== Literary style and activism ==
Westlake's work incorporated modernist techniques, Japanese haiku, Chinese ideograms, and elements of local pidgin. His style of translation has been compared to Gary Snyder, Arthur Waley, and Burton Watson.

"some people didn’t understand what he [Westlake] was doing, what he wrote about, how he wrote about it."

In the mid-1970s, Westlake began writing concrete poetry, a global post-World War II movement that explored extended poetry beyond the written word. He used visual spacing, ideograms, and pictographs to explore the relationship between language and space.

Westlake worked as a journalist and activist. He was involved in reporting on environmental and land-rights issues related to Kahoʻolawe and opposing United States military policies in the Pacific.

== Death and legacy ==
Westlake was in a traffic collision in 1984. He was driving to his house in Volcano, Hawaii when his car was T-boned by a drunk driver. Westlake was taken to Hilo Hospital. He died two weeks later on February 16, 1984. He was 36 years old at the time of his death.

Up until his death, his only poetry collection was an independently published chapbook. His partner, Mei-Li M. Siy, and his friend and co-editor, Richard Hamasaki, gathered his published and unpublished materials and, with the University of Hawaiʻi Press, published over 200 of his poems in 2009 under the title "Westlake: Poems by Wayne Kaumualiʻi Westlake."

In 2000, Siy found his manuscripts under a tarp in a shed outdoors. Siy is the literary executor for Westlake

In 2013, Hamasaki and Siy worked together with artists to create Down on the sidewalk in Waikiki: songs from Wayne Kaumualii Westlake's poems.

Hamasaki made a short film based on Westlake's poem MANIFESTO [for Concrete Poetry] in 2024.

== Selected publications ==
Title	Editor	Year
Westlake: Poems by Wayne Kaumualiʻi Westlake (1947-1984)	Edited by Mei-Li M. Siy and Richard Hamasaki	2009
It's Okay If You Eat Lots of Rice	—	1979
Born Pidgin	—	1979
Kahoolawe—Chants, Legends, Poems, Stories by Children of Maui	Compiled by Wayne Westlake, Ruth Nakamura, Loma Solanzo, and Cathy Vaughan	1977
