= Wayne Perry =

Wayne Perry may refer to:

- Wayne M. Perry (born 1950), National President of the Boy Scouts of America
- Wayne Perry (country music) (1950-2005), American singer-songwriter
- Wayne Perry (lawn bowls) (born 1982), South African lawn bowler

== See also ==
- Perry (surname)
