= Wayne MacGregor =

Wayne MacGregor may refer to:

- Wayne MacGregor, character in The Alligator People
- Wayne McGregor (born 1970), British choreographer and director
