= Wayne Mitchell =

Wayne Mitchell may refer to:

- Wayne Mitchell (singer), American gospel singer
- Wayne Mitchell (politician) (1952–2019), Native American politician
- Wayne Marshall (deejay), Wayne Mitchell (born 1980), Jamaican reggae and dancehall deejay
