= Wayne Clarke =

Wayne Clarke may refer to:

- Wayne Clarke (footballer) (born 1961), former professional football player from England

== See also ==
- Wayne Clark (disambiguation)
