= Wayne Coffey =

Wayne Coffey may refer to:

- Wayne Coffey (sportswriter), author and journalist who co-wrote a biography for R. A. Dickey
- Wayne Coffey (American football) (born 1964), American former NFL player
