= Wayne Miller =

Wayne Miller may refer to:

- G. Wayne Miller (born 1954), American author
- Wayne F. Miller (1918–2013), American photographer
- Wayne Miller (poet) (born 1976), American poet

== See also ==
- Wayne Millner (1913–1976), American football player
