= Wayne Goss (make-up artist) =

English make-up artist and YouTuber

- Born: Wayne Alan Goss; 4 March 1978 (age 48); Bridgwater, Somerset, England
- Occupations: Makeup artist; YouTube personality; entrepreneur
- Years active: 2009–present

YouTube information
- Channel: Wayne Goss
- Genre: Beauty vlogger
- Subscribers: 3.97 million
- Views: 584 million
- Last updated: 21 October 2025
- Website: www.waynegoss.co.uk

Wayne Alan Goss (born 4 March 1978) is an English makeup artist, YouTube personality and entrepreneur. Best known for his "Wayne Goss" channel on YouTube, he is the creator and owner of the eponymous makeup brush line launched in September 2013. As of December 2019, Goss' main YouTube channel had over 3.75 million subscribers and has had 493 million views.

== Personal life ==
Born in the town of Bridgwater in Somerset, England, as the first child to Alan and Bernie Goss, at eighteen months old he was fostered to his maternal uncle and his wife and raised in Burnham-on-Sea. Despite relating the development of his interest in makeup at a young age, Goss has said in various interviews that suffering from acne at the age of 20 was the spur to his launching a career in the makeup industry. Goss is gay, and was married in 2022 to his long term partner. He now lives and works in South Wales, UK.

== Career ==
Goss has said that he started out as self-taught by reading makeup books written by contemporary artists Way Bandy and Kevyn Aucoin. He then furthered his study in makeup artistry in London and trained professionally as a makeup artist. Goss works freelance without a portfolio and takes bookings on the recommendation of existing clients.

=== YouTube ===
==== Gossmakeupartist ====
Goss began publishing videos on YouTube under the username Gossmakeupartist in 2009. Unlike makeup tutorials commonly found on YouTube, Goss' videos incorporate other features such as instructing viewers in different ways of makeup application for the corresponding face shapes aiming to provide a user-friendly approach to makeup. His tutorial on how to contour and highlight like Kim Kardashian has over ten million views as of 2016.

Goss has signed with the multi-channel networks on YouTube, Kin Community, since 2013. His main channel was the most subscribed channel of a male makeup artist in 2015 and was ranked 33rd on the most subscribed how to & style YouTube channel category in 2015, and has been honoured with several awards, including Refinery29's Beauty Innovator Award for Must-Watch Beauty Vlogger.

==== Gossmakeupchat ====
In 2012, Goss established his second YouTube channel, Gossmakeupchat, where he regularly posts product reviews and videos discussing other topics. The channel has over 400,000 subscribers as of September 2016.

=== Makeup brush line ===
In September 2013, in partnership with Beautylish, a west-coast based e-commerce site, Goss launched his own line of makeup brushes and its first collection, "Wayne Goss – The Collection." The line was successful, and the collection sold out in the first minutes after launching online. His limited edition Holiday Brush accumulated a 12,000-person waiting list before release. "The Wayne Goss Face Set" and "Eye Set", an extension of the brush line, were released in spring 2014. The line was nominated for Best Makeup Brushes in the 2014 Readers' Choice Awards organised by beauty blog Temptalia. Since launch, "Wayne Goss" brushes have gained popularity, being described by the CEO of Beautylish as one of the best-sellers sitewide.

In September 2015, Goss announced on his YouTube channel and his social media accounts the launch of his "Brow Set".

In June 2024 he released a synthetic brush line.

=== Collaboration ===
Goss collaborated with Paula's Choice in creating the brand's "The Nude Mattes Eyeshadow Palette", launched in April 2014 as a limited edition release.

== Awards ==
| Year | Title | Award | Nominated work | Result |
|---|---|---|---|---|
| 2014 | Temptalia's Readers' Choice Awards | Best Makeup Brushes | Wayne Goss Brushes | Nominated |
| 2015 | Refinery29's Beauty Innovator Award | Must-Watch Beauty Vlogger | Himself | Won |
