= Wayne Morris (Australian footballer) =

Australian rules footballer

Personal information
- Full name: Wayne Morris
- Born: 19 July 1947 (age 79)
- Original team: Warburton-Millgrove
- Height: 188 cm (6 ft 2 in)
- Weight: 78 kg (172 lb)

Playing career^{1}
Years	Club	Games (Goals)
1967	South Melbourne	5 (0)
- Sale
- Longwarry
1974–1978	Warburton-Millgrove	
- ^{1} Playing statistics correct to the end of 1967.

Wayne Morris (born 19 July 1947) is a former Australian rules footballer who played with South Melbourne in the Victorian Football League (VFL). Wayne won 4 club best and fairests with WMFC (1974, 1975, 1976, 1978) and 3 league best and fairests with YVMDFL (1975, 1976, 1978). Wayne played with Sale during enlistment with RAAF, then Longwarry. At 31 Wayne retired to circumvent on-field injury foreclosing his career as a timber miller. To escape repressive Victorian winters, a timber mill near Gympie Qld was acquired, whilst domiciled in Noosa Junction. The mill is now run by a daughter and son-in-law. Wayne is now retired and re-domiciled in Noosa Heads, golf his passion.
