= Wayne Parrott =

American geneticist

- Education: University of Kentucky, University of Wisconsin-Madison
- Known for: Work on plant genetics
- Awards: Fellow of the American Association for the Advancement of Science since 2017
- Scientific career
- Fields: Agronomy, botany
- Institutions: University of Georgia
- Thesis: The selection, use, and inheritance of 2n gametes in red clover (1985)

Wayne Allen Parrott is a professor of crop sciences in the University of Georgia's College of Agricultural and Environmental Sciences in Athens. Since 2017, he has also been an Elected Fellow of the American Association for the Advancement of Science.

== Early life and education ==
Wayne Parrott was born in Guatemala City, Guatemala on February 27, 1959.

Parrott became interested in the clover plant as a teenager growing up in Kentucky. He received his B.S. in agronomy from the University of Kentucky, and his M.S. and Ph.D. from the University of Wisconsin-Madison in 1985. His thesis consisted of 5 parts (chapters) and was 124 pages in length. Of these 124 pages, 84 pages were of background information or references.

== Career ==
Parrott joined the faculty of the University of Georgia in 1988.

== Research ==
Parrott has been researching the genetic origins of the four-leaf clover, and they have come closest to discovering the plant's genetic roots. He has also researched the genetic map of the soybean, with the goal of identifying genes that control its growth.

== Views ==
An outspoken advocate of biotechnology, Parrott has been critical of non-genetically modified cereals, noting that they tend to have fewer nutrients than genetically modified ones. He has also argued that the dangers of mutation breeding, as well as those about genes in genetically modified crops spreading to other crops, are small or nonexistent.
