= Wayne Thompson =

Wayne Thompson may refer to:

- Wayne Thompson (EastEnders), a fictional character
- Wayne Thompson (rugby union) (born 1984), English rugby union player

== See also ==
- Wayne Thomson, Canadian politician
