= Wayne Madsen =

Wayne Madsen may refer to:

- Wayne Madsen (journalist) (born 1954), American journalist and conspiracy theorist
- Wayne Madsen (sportsperson) (born 1984), English cricketer
