= Wayne Stevens =

Wayne Stevens may refer to:

- Wayne Stevens (basketball) (born 1936), American basketballer
- Wayne Stevens (software engineer) (1944–1993), American software engineer
- Bones Hillman (Wayne Stevens, 1958–2020), New Zealand musician
- Wayne Stevens (rugby union) (born 1988), South African rugby player
