= Wayne Moore =

Wayne Moore may refer to:

- Wayne Moore (American football) (1945–1989), NFL offensive tackle for the Miami Dolphins
- Wayne Moore (Canadian football) (born 1992), Canadian football running back
- Wayne Moore (swimmer) (1931–2015), American Olympic swimmer
