= Wayne Peveto =

American politician

Member of the Texas House of Representatives from the 8th district
- In office January 9, 1973 – January 11, 1983

Member of the Texas House of Representatives from the 19th district
- In office January 11, 1983 – January 8, 1985

Personal details
- Party: Democratic
- Education: Sam Houston State University; University of Houston

Wayne Peveto is an American politician. He served as a Democratic member for the 8th and 19th district of the Texas House of Representatives.

== Life and career ==
Peveto attended Orangefield High School, Sam Houston State University and the University of Houston.

In 1973, Peveto was elected to represent the 8th district of the Texas House of Representatives, serving until 1983. In the same year, he was elected to represent the 19th district, serving until 1985.
