= Wayne Collins =

Wayne Collins is the name of:

- Wayne Collins (footballer) (born 1969), English footballer
- Wayne Collins (politician) (born 1949), Canadian journalist and politician
- Wayne M. Collins (1900–1974), American civil rights attorney
- Wayne Collins (rugby league) (born 1967), Australian player and coach
