= Wayne Cooper =

Wayne Cooper may refer to:

- Wayne Cooper (artist) (born 1942), Native American painter
- Wayne Cooper (basketball) (1956–2022), American basketball player
- Wayne Cooper (fashion designer), British-born fashion designer in Australia
- Wayne Cooper (snooker player) (born 1978), English snooker player
- Wayne Cooper, deceased member of American funk band Cameo
