= Wayne Meyer =

Wayne Meyer may refer to:

- Wayne R. Meyer (1949–2009), American politician and farmer from Idaho
- Wayne E. Meyer (1926–2009), American rear admiral
- USS Wayne E. Meyer, an American US Navy destroyer
