= Wayne Hughes =

Wayne Hughes may refer to:

== People ==
- Wayne Hughes (pastor), New Zealand pastor
- Wayne Hughes (footballer) (born 1958), Welsh footballer
- B. Wayne Hughes (1933–2021), American billionaire businessman
- B. Wayne Hughes Jr. (born 1958/1959), American businessman

== Fictional characters ==
- Wayne Hughes (EastEnders), fictional character in British soap opera EastEnders
