= Wayne Simmons (commentator) =

American commentator and fraudster

- Employer: Fox News (previously)
- Notable work: l

Wayne Shelby Simmons (born 1953 or 1954) is a former Fox News guest commentator who claimed to be an ex-CIA agent. He was exposed as a fraud by actual CIA analyst Kent Clizbe, and convicted of multiple counts of fraud and other violations in 2016.

== Early life and education ==
Raised in Maryland, Simmons was the son of an FBI fingerprints expert and Wayne Allison Simmons, a distinguished naval officer who was at Pearl Harbor. His sister was a senior official in the Navy and then under George W. Bush in the Defense Department. He attended Jacksonville State University.

== Career and claims ==
Simmons claimed to have enlisted in the Navy in 1973, received a medical discharge, and then trained in Alaska and worked for the CIA for 27 years, specializing in organizational sabotage, and retired in 2000. After being recruited to Fox in 2001 and making his first appearance on the Geraldo Rivera Show, he was a guest on Fox News in 2002, and by 2004 had become a regular guest commentator and was recruited into the Pentagon military analyst program in support of American intervention in Iraq; he was present when President Bush signed the Military Commissions Act in 2006. In 2012 co-wrote The Natanz Directive, a novel he claimed to be partially autobiographical, about a retired CIA operative recalled to duty. In 2012, although the government was already aware of his false claims, he became a member of the Citizens' Commission on Benghazi. He referred to President Obama as a "boy king" and Nancy Pelosi as a "pathological liar", and in February 2015 claimed there were "at least 19 paramilitary Muslim training facilities in the United States". He was not paid by Fox; during his years as a news commentator, he started Simmons Air, a commuter airline, and after its failure worked in 2008 for military contractor BAE Systems but performed unsatisfactorily during training as a Human Terrain System Team leader, was rejected for a position with Triple Canopy in 2009 after a background check by the State Department revealed that he did not have the CIA experience he claimed, and had to return in 2010 from a contractor post in Afghanistan after revocation of his temporary security clearance.

According to prosecutors, instead of the CIA Simmons had actually worked at a carpeting company, as a head waiter at a nightclub and a manager at an adult entertainment hot tub business, operated limousine and AIDS testing businesses, run an illegal gambling operation out of his home, and also played semi-professionally for the Baltimore Eagles and professionally as a defensive back for the New Orleans Saints for a few months in summer 1978. He was arrested in 2007 for attacking a Pakistani cab driver whom he falsely identified as having a bomb, and has several convictions for drunk driving and two previous federal firearms convictions.

== Charges and conviction ==
Kent Clizbe, who had actually worked for the CIA and as an intelligence consultant with a specialty in deception detection, saw through Simmons' story when he met him in 2010. His alerting his former boss, as well as the suspicions of other former CIA agents, led to an investigation, although in 2013 the Washington Times decided not to pursue a story on the issue because Simmons had been granted a security clearance and sent to Afghanistan. In October 2015, Simmons was arrested by the FBI and charged with fraud, including using fraud to obtain employment with military contractors and defrauding a woman of $125,000. He pleaded guilty to major fraud against the U.S. government, wire fraud, and a firearms offense, while maintaining that he had worked for the CIA; on July 15, 2016, he was convicted and sentenced to 33 months in prison plus three years of supervised release, restitution, and forfeiture of criminal proceeds.

== Personal life ==
Simmons lived in Annapolis. His wife, Corinne, a military hospital administrator, died in 2012; they had two children, one of whom is in the Secret Service.
