= Wayne Jackson =

Wayne Jackson may refer to:

- Wayne Jackson (brigadier), senior Australian army officer
- Wayne Jackson (footballer) (born 1944), Australian football player and former CEO of the Australian Football League
- Wayne Jackson (musician) (1941–2016), trumpet player and member of the Memphis Horns
- Wayne Jackson (singer) (born 1971), British pop singer
- Bishop Wayne T. Jackson, Great Faith Ministries International
