= Wayne Westmark =

American public servant (1932–2016)

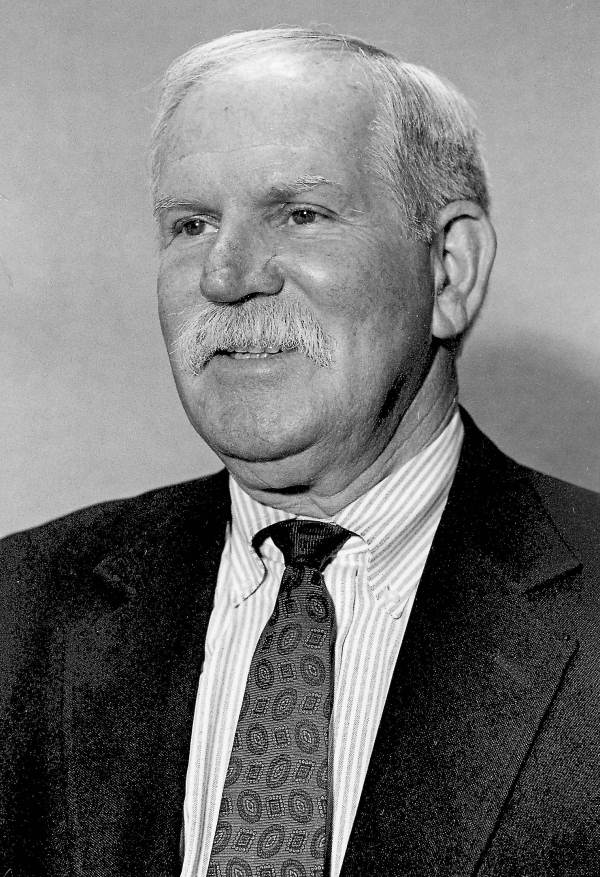
- Born: December 15, 1932; Pensacola, Florida, U.S.
- Died: July 7, 2016 (aged 83); Tallahassee, Florida, U.S.
- Education: Florida State University
- Occupation: Public Servant

Glenn Wayne Westmark (December 15, 1932 – July 7, 2016) was an American public servant who was sergeant-at-arms of the House of Representatives of the state of Florida from 1976 until he retired in 1998. He received his bachelor's degree from the Florida State University in 1958. Westmark later lived near Tallahassee, Florida. He died there on July 7, 2016, at the age of 83.
