= Wayne Bevan =

Australian rules footballer

Personal information
- Full name: Wayne Bevan
- Born: 26 January 1953 (age 73)
- Original team: Thorton-Eildon
- Height: 192 cm (6 ft 4 in)
- Weight: 88 kg (194 lb)

Playing career^{1}
Years	Club	Games (Goals)
1973–1975	Hawthorn	20 (37)
- ^{1} Playing statistics correct to the end of 1975.

Wayne Bevan (born 26 January 1953) is a former Australian rules footballer who played with Hawthorn in the Victorian Football League (VFL). Wayne was a member of the 1972 Reserves Premiership team and showed a lot of promise at full-forward for Hawthorn in 1973, with his magnificent long torpedo punts a feature of his game.

Bevan had grown up in Rubicon, north-east of Melbourne, and played his junior football for Thornton-Eildon District Football & Netball Club. Thornton only had an under 17 team and he played in this from age 11 onwards. Bevan played one senior game for Thornton-eildon as a 15-year-old, kicking six goals against Avenel in the Waranga North East Football Association, a strong competition which included modern-day GVFL clubs, Euroa, Mansfield and Seymour. Bevan was a South Melbourne supporter growing up, but Hawthorn was his ‘second team’, as the game he tended to see each year was Hawthorn versus South at Glenferrie.

Tragically, Bevan’s father died when on the job for the SEC and the family moved to Ashburton to be closer to his mother’s parents.

In 1969, Bevan who had become a Chadstone High School student, represented the Hawthorn Football Club and made it through to the final of the Sunkick with an average of 58 yds 2 in. His longest kick was 65 yds 1 ft 2 in "or approximately 60 Meters".

Bevan played for Hawthorn’s 1970 Under 17 premiership team, which thrashed East Brighton 17.14.116 to 9.11.65 in the Grand Final. However, because zoning applied for three years, he could not sign at any higher level for the Hawks, being still residentially tied to Geelong from his days at Rubicon, and currently living in Richmond’s zone.

So, Bevan played for Tooronga-Malvern in C Section of the VAFA in 1971. The club was the result of a 1964 merger between Tooronga and Malvern Amateurs, with the former having produced several noteworthy Hawthorn players in earlier decades, including Jack Blackman, Les Pabst and Mel Williams. Bevan produced an outstanding year, kicking 110 goals for the season. Despite five goals from Bevan, Tooronga-Malvern lost to Old Trinity by 50 points in the Second Semi, but turned the tables in the Grand Final, winning by five points – 9.9.63 to 8.10.58, with Bevan kicking three goals.

In 1972, Bevan received dispensation from the VFL to play for Hawthorn and ‘stood out’ in his first practice match, when he was ‘instrumental’ in several goals. Having begun the season in the Reserves in defence, he was then moved to his natural position up forward where he proceeded to kick 57 goals for the season, finishing runner-up in the Reserves competition goalkicking behind Essendon’s Rod McFarlane (62 goals). Bevan kicked four in the narrow Grand Final win against Melbourne, the result making it three Flags in three years for the 19-year-old. His promise was recognized by his being awarded the ‘Most Promising not played in 1st XVIII’ award.

Bevan’s bag of eight goals for the Reserves in Round 1 1973 was enough to secure him selection for his Senior debut against Melbourne at Glenferrie in Round 2, finding out about his selection from his mother on Friday morning, who had seen it on ‘League Teams’ after he had gone to bed. He kicked two goals on tough Melbourne full-back Ray Biffen, with his debut finishing in dramatic fashion, as he had a long shot for goal after the siren with children all over the ground. He kicked the goal, but unfortunately this was only to cut the deficit from eight points to two, not to win the game.

Bevan kicked goals in each of his first 14 games, including bags of five versus Fitzroy, Richmond and South Melbourne, and four against League-leader Collingwood. Bevan particularly remembers the five against powerhouse Richmond at the MCG where, in one instance, he judged a wayward kick into the forward line better than the great Francis Bourke. In 15 games in 1973, Bevan kicked 36 goals, a tally which makes him the youngest player to kick 30 or more goals in a debut season for the Hawks. A feature of Bevan’s game was his accuracy which saw him kick 36.18.

At the Truth Footy Olympics in February 1974, Bevan won the Punt Kick event with a kick of 64 yds "approx 59 meters". J Keast Footsray 61 yds and W Walsh Richmond 60 yds 4 in were the other place getters.

With what he describes as ‘second year blues’ he only managed four Senior games in 1974, but still kicked 38 goals for the Reserves, one goal fewer Lou Milner who topped the Reserves tally for the club, Bevan’s tally not helped by playing several games in the backline. His overall performance in the Reserves in 1974 saw him finish second in the Best and Fairest, behind Mike Zemski.

Bevan was ready to fire in 1975, kicking nine goals in an intra-club practice game but was then struck down with a bout of glandular fever. Initially, doctors diagnosed something even more serious, and he was rushed to Fairfield Infectious Diseases Hospital in an ambulance, before eventually they recognised it was glandular fever.

Bevan was back in the Reserves by Round 5, kicking three goals, and then in Round 6 kicked five goals against Carlton, but unfortunately, he was reported for striking in the last quarter and received a significant suspension. Upon his return from suspension, some good Reserves form saw Bevan earn a spot on the bench in the Seniors for the Round 14, against South Melbourne at Waverley, where he replaced Len Petch in the third quarter. A relapse of the glandular fever did not help Bevan was again pressing for Senior selection late in the season, but another untimely suspension arising out of the Reserves Elimination Final ended his season.

After the events of 1975, and a car accident at Alexandra, Bevan was attracted to the idea of a fresh start and so moved to SANFL club Central District in 1976. A further enticement was an extremely attractive financial offer, which was $5,500 more per annum than the match payments he was receiving at Hawthorn. As he recalls, this was hard to turn down as it was enough for a deposit on a new home. Another attraction of Centrals was that Bevan’s good friend Gene Chiron was still involved at the club, despite being seriously injured playing there the previous season. Bevan’s clearance was delayed by a breakdown in clearances between VFL and SANFL, but it was eventually sorted out. He played 18 games for Centrals, kicking 14 goals, but mainly playing in defence, with the team finishing sixth, missing the Final Five on percentage. With hindsight, Bevan wishes he had stayed at Hawthorn in 1976, however really enjoyed his time at Centrals.

Due to family illness, and the loss of two grandparents, Bevan returned to Melbourne in 1977 and had discussions with Collingwood about resuming his VFL career. However, Hawthorn ruled out clearing him to the Magpies, so he played for Dandenong in the VFA First Division that season. There were some familiar faces at Dandenong in 1977, with other ex-Hawks, Ken Beck, Brian Shinners, Ron Stubbs and Gerry Lynn also at the club. When he played in a one-point win at Williamstown in Round 14, The Age reported that ‘Dandenong officials were pleased with the form of centre half-forward Wayne Bevan and full-back Jim O’Dea who both came into the side this week’. Dandenong finished fifth, narrowly missing the Final Four.

After just one season with the Redlegs, Bevan returned to Tooronga-Malvern which, in the meantime, had moved to the South East Suburban FL. The club won the SESFL B Grade premiership in 1978 and prospered in A Grade, making Grand Finals in 1979 and 1981. In 1982, Bevan kicked 104 goals for the season to top the SESFL goalkicking and also being runner up in the competition B&F. He finished his playing career with nine games at Cora Lynn, kicking 45 goals before a serious injury caused him to retire from the game. He was also runner up in the SWGFL competition B&F. His great mate Gene Chiron played with him both in his final season at Tooronga-Malvern and at Cora Lynn.

Throughout his Hawthorn career, and indeed for 43 years, Bevan worked for the ANZ Bank, rising to the position of senior manager. In his Hawthorn days, his work and football were geographically close as he was at the Hartwell, Auburn and Glenferrie branches of the bank in that period, and was at the branch at 133 Swan St, Richmond with Bohdan Jaworskyj when both put in for transfers to Adelaide in 1976.

After his playing career, Bevan’s involvement with football included being an assistant coach for the ANZ Bank team in the VAFA, and later acting as team manager for his son Daniel’s team at Knox FC in the EFL. Bevan is now living on the Mornington Peninsula.
