= Wayne Perryman =

American writer and clergy

Wayne Perryman (born 1945) is an African-American clergyman who has served as Minister in Charge of Church Administration for Mt. Calvary Christian Center Church of God in Christ in Mercer Island, Washington. He also heads his own consulting firm specializing in conducting fact-finding investigations on behalf of inner city plaintiffs who are unsuccessful in obtaining representation through law firms and community agencies.

== Career ==
In 1998 Perryman led a protest against police department profiling in Washington. The African-American Perryman had frequently been stopped in his Mercer Island hometown by police claiming his being there was suspicious.

In 2005 Perryman brought suit against the Democratic Party in the United States District Court in Seattle Case No. CV04-2442 for what he called its history of racism including their historical support of Jim Crow laws, slavery, and Black Codes. Perryman appealed the Court's ruling, but he lacked standing to bring the case to the US Supreme Court.

In 2009 Perryman endorsed Elizabeth Scott for Washington state representative, position 2, 21st Legislative District.

In 2011, Perry filed a lawsuit against the Democratic Party, stating that the Democrats' historical support for racist policies such as race-based slavery and Jim Crow segregationism caused both psychological and physical damage to African Americans.

== Books ==
- The 1993 Trial on the Curse of Ham, Pneuma Life Pub, 1994. ISBN 1-56229-423-7
- Unfounded Loyalty: An In-Depth Look Into The Love Affair Between Blacks and Democrats, Pneuma Life Publishing, 2003. ISBN 1-56229-073-8
- Unveiling the Whole Truth: What the Media Failed to Tell American Voters, Book Publishers Network, 2008. ISBN 1-887542-61-2
- Whites, Blacks & Racist Democrats: The Untold History of Race & Politics Within the Democratic Party from 1792-2009, Book Publishers Network, 2010. ISBN 1-935359-30-4
