= Wayne Bentson =

American fraudster

Wayne C. Bentson is a businessman and tax protester from Payson, Arizona.

Bentson operated Western Information Network and the Bentson Group until May 1997. He represented himself as a tax expert and told his clients that they did not need to pay federal income tax.

Benston helped Milton William Cooper research the article BATF/IRS – Criminal Fraud which was published in Veritas magazine, issue #6, in September 1995.

According to the United States Department of Justice, Bentson was accused of falsely advising clients that the federal income tax laws apply only "to individuals residing in the Virgin Islands, Guam, and Puerto Rico" or federal lands where the federal government has jurisdiction. Bentson was convicted of conspiracy to defraud the United States and willful failure to file personal federal income tax returns by a federal jury on December 13, 2004, in Tucson, Arizona. On May 18, 2005, he was sentenced to four years in prison and three years of "supervised release during which he is barred from giving tax advice." He was ordered to pay $1,129,937 to the Internal Revenue Service in restitution.

Bentson was incarcerated at the Federal Community Corrections facility at Phoenix, Arizona, and was released in May 2008.
