= Wayne Osborne (footballer) =

English footballer

Personal information
- Full name: Wayne Osborne
- Date of birth: 14 January 1977 (age 49)
- Place of birth: Stockton-on-Tees, County Durham, England
- Height: 5 ft 10 in (1.78 m)
- Position: Defender

Youth career
- –1995: York City

Senior career*
Years	Team	Apps	(Gls)
1995–1997	York City	6	(0)
- Bishop Auckland
Total		6	(0)
- * Club domestic league appearances and goals

Wayne Osborne (born 14 January 1977) is an English former professional footballer who played as a defender in the Football League for York City and in non-League football for Bishop Auckland.
