= Gary McClelland =

American psychologist

Gary H. McClelland is an American psychologist and professor emeritus of psychology at the University of Colorado at Boulder. His research interests focus on decision making, statistical methodologies, and economic psychology.

== Education ==
McClelland received his Ph.D. in mathematical psychology from the University of Michigan in 1974.
