= Wayne Cusic =

American football and basketball player and coach (1905–1993)

Biographical details
- Born: April 14, 1905; Griggsville, Illinois, U.S.
- Died: November 20, 1993 (aged 88); Lake Charles, Louisiana, U.S.

Playing career

Football
- 1925–1927: Illinois College

Coaching career (HC unless noted)

Football
- 1940: McNeese State
- 1945: McNeese State

Basketball
- 1945–1952: McNeese State

Accomplishments and honors

Awards
- McNeese Hall of Fame (1982); Illinois College Hall of Fame (1982)

Wayne Norred Cusic (April 14, 1905 – November 20, 1993) was an American college football and college basketball player and coach. He served as the head football coach at McNeese State University in 1940 and 1945.
