= Wayne Wesolowski =

American model builder

Wayne Wesolowski University of Arizona
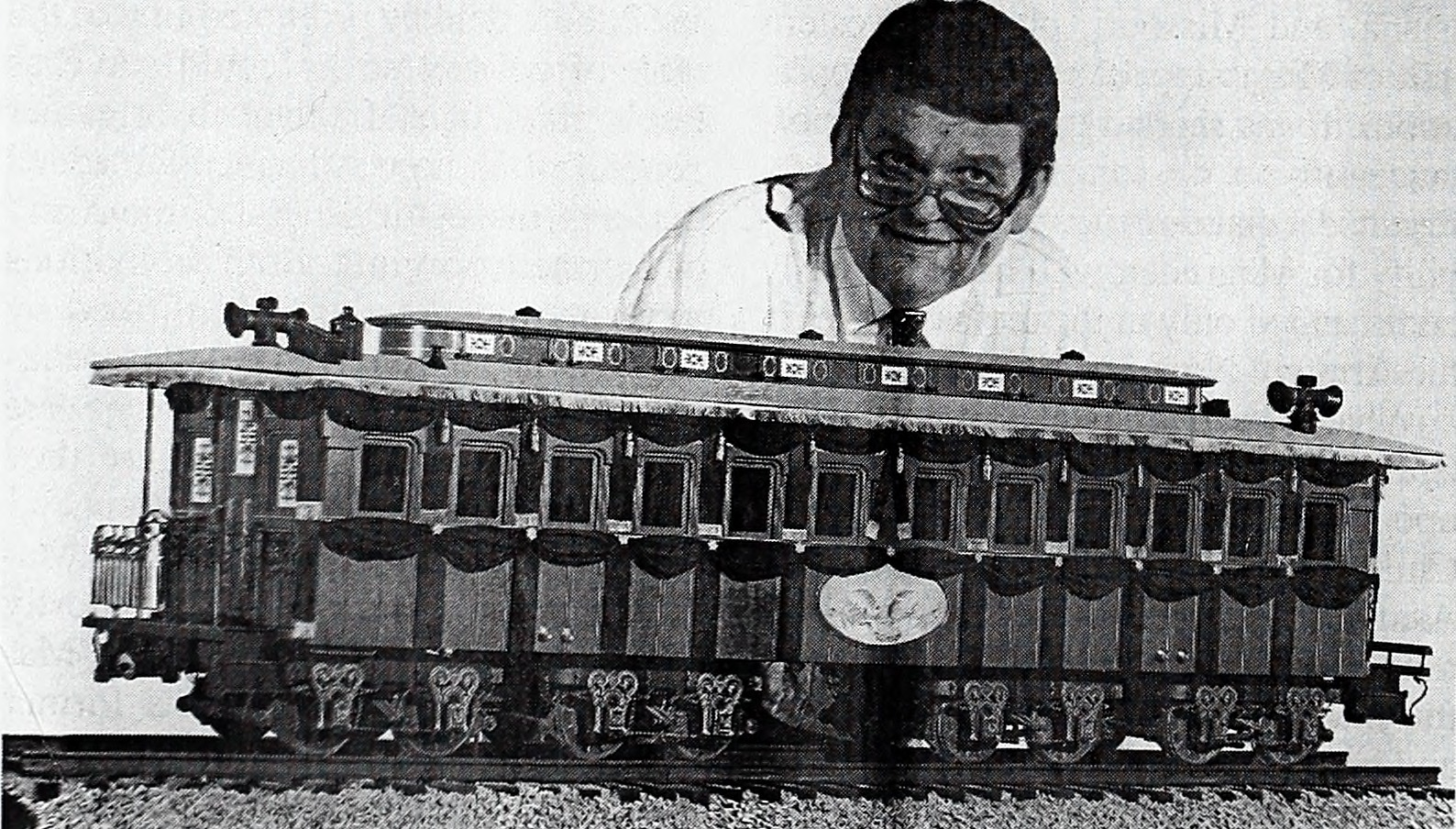
- Occupations: Model train maker and chemistry professor.
- Website: Wayne's Trains: Custom Model Building

Wayne Wesolowski is a builder of miniature models.

Wesolowski's models have been exhibited at the Chicago Museum of Science and Industry, the Springfield Abraham Lincoln Presidential Museum, the West Chicago City Museum, the Batavia Depot Museum, and the National Railroad Museum.

One of his more noted works is a model of Abraham Lincoln's funeral train. This model took 4½ years to build and is nearly 15 feet long. Wesolowski appeared on an episode of Tracks Ahead featuring this train and his model of Lincoln's home.

Wesolowski has written numerous articles and several books on model building. He has been featured in videos shown on PBS television. Good Morning America selected and showed part of one tape as an example of video education.

Bob Hundman of Mainline Modeler magazine noted that "He's always leading those of us who like scratchbuilding down new roads. He's a very inventive modeler."

Wesolowski holds a Ph.D. in chemistry from the University of Arizona and is Professor of Chemistry at Benedictine University.

== Publications ==
- Wesolowski, Wayne (1995). The Lincoln train is coming. Lincoln Group of Illinois. OCLC 318204083.
- Wesolowski, Wayne; Mary Cay Wesolowski (1985). ABCs of Building Model Railroad Cars. Tab Books. ISBN 0830616357.
- Wesolowski, Wayne (1981). Model Railroad Scratchbuilding. Tab Books. ISBN 0830696571.
