= Wayne Marshall (rugby league) =

Australian rugby league player

Personal information
- Born: 7 November 1963 (age 62)

Playing information
- Position: Hooker
Club
Years	Team	Pld	T	G	FG	P
1987	Easts (Brisbane)	4	1	0	0	4
1988–1994	Eastern Suburbs	58	12	0	0	48
1994–1995	Salford
	Total	62	13	0	0	52

Wayne Marshall (born 7 November 1963) is a former Australian professional rugby league player. A hooker, he is best remembered for his time spent playing for the Eastern Suburbs between 1988 and 1994. Marshall also represented Brisbane side Easts (1987) and Salford (1994–95) in the United Kingdom.
