= Wayne D. Lewis Jr. =

Academic administrator

Wayne D. Lewis Jr. is an academic administrator who is currently serving as the sixth president of Houghton University and is the first African American president of the institution. He succeeded Dr. Shirley A. Mullen, who served in the role since 2006.

== Education ==
Lewis earned a bachelor’s degree in criminal justice from Loyola University in 2001. He then went on to earn a master's in urban studies with a minor in public administration from the University of Akron’s Buchtel College of Arts and Sciences in 2002. He also did post-baccalaureate studies in special education-mild/moderate disabilities at the University of New Orleans in 2004. Lewis then earned his Ph.D. in educational research and policy analysis with a minor in public administration from North Carolina State University’s College of Education in 2009.

== Professional life ==
Before his role as president of Houghton University, Lewis was the inaugural dean and professor of education at Belmont University. He also previously worked at the Commonwealth of Kentucky in roles such as executive director of education policy and programs and commissioner of education. Before that, Lewis worked at the University of Kentucky for 10 years as the Principal Leadership Program chair, assistant professor of educational leadership studies, educational leadership doctoral programs chair, and associate professor of educational leadership.

== Multicultural center controversy ==
As president of Houghton University, Lewis has overseen the closing of the mosaic multicultural center. This decision to close the multicultural center was controversial on campus and resulted in the firing of a resident director, citing defamatory speech over an opinion given to the on-campus newspaper.

== Personal life ==
Lewis is a native of New Orleans and attended St. Augustine High School there. He currently resides in Houghton, New York, with his wife, Monica, and his daughter, Whitley.
