= Wayne Norman =

Philosopher

Wayne Norman (born 1961) is the Mike and Ruth Mackowski Professor of Ethics in the Philosophy Department and Kenan Institute for Ethics at Duke University. He specializes in political philosophy and business ethics.

== Education and career ==
He received his BA from Trent University, and his doctorate from the London School of Economics. Prior to joining Duke, he held Chairs in Business Ethics at the Université de Montréal and the University of British Columbia, and prior to that he taught in the philosophy departments at the University of Ottawa and the University of Western Ontario. He has held visiting appointments in six countries and his work has been published in 10 languages. He is currently Associate Editor of Business Ethics Quarterly.

== Philosophical work ==
He is best known for his work in political philosophy, including especially his work on citizenship and nationalism, but most of his work since the publication of his book Negotiating Nationalism in 2006 has focused on business ethics. Much of his work in the field of business ethics has drawn upon his broad knowledge of political philosophy.

== Publications ==
=== Books ===
- W. Norman, Negotiating Nationalism: Nation-building, Federalism, and Secession in the Multinational State, Oxford: Oxford University Press, 2006.
- D. Karmis and W. Norman, eds, Theories of Federalism, New York: Palgrave-Macmillan Publishing, 2005.
- R. Beiner and W. Norman, eds, Canadian Political Philosophy, Toronto: Oxford University Press, 2001.
- W. Kymlicka and W. Norman, eds, Citizenship in Diverse Societies, Oxford: Oxford University Press, 2000.
- W. Norman, Taking Freedom Too Seriously? an essay on analytic and post-analytic political philosophy, New York & London: Garland Publishing, 1991.
