= Wayne Dennis =

Canadian football player (born 1940)

Profile
- Positions: Defensive tackle, Tackle

Personal information
- Born: July 22, 1940 (age 86); Vancouver, British Columbia, Canada
- Listed height: 6 ft 0 in (1.83 m)
- Listed weight: 235 lb (107 kg)

Career history
- 1964: BC Lions
- 1964–1967: Winnipeg Blue Bombers
- 1968–1970: BC Lions

Awards and highlights
- Grey Cup champion (1964)

Wayne Dennis (born July 22, 1940) is a Canadian former professional football player who played for the Winnipeg Blue Bombers #63 and BC Lions #52. He won the Grey Cup with the Lions in 1964. He played college football at University of Montana-Missoula for the Montana Grizzlies.
