= Wayne Haylen =

Australian judge

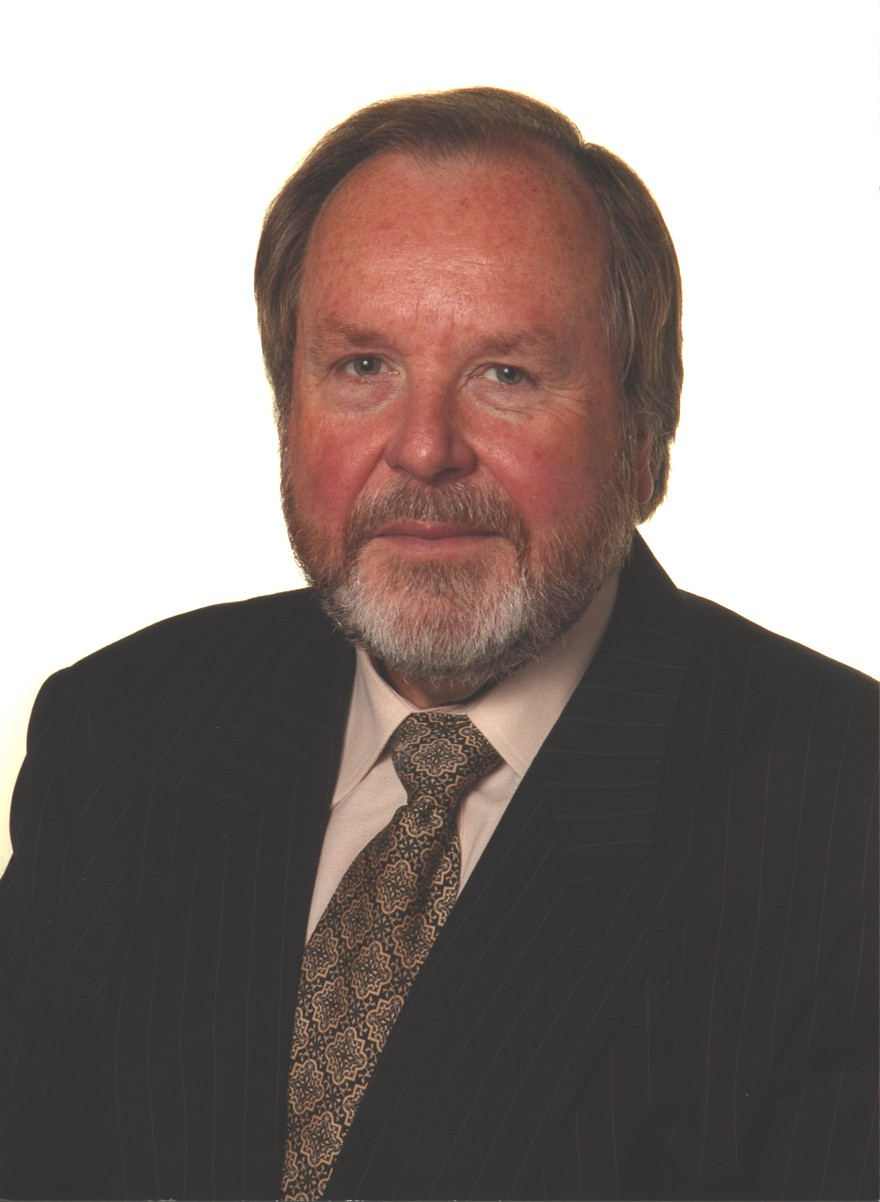
Justice Wayne Haylen

Wayne Roger Haylen QC is a former Judge of the New South Wales Industrial Court (27 July 2001 to 24 October 2013).

== Education ==
Haylen was educated at Canterbury Boys High School, before attending the University of Sydney. He founded the Youth Campaign Against Conscription and in September 1965 took the initiative in regular mass demonstrations against the war and conscription. He was photographed burning his national service registration card at a rally in Belmore Park, Sydney on 3 March 1966. A BA was conferred in 1967 and an LL.B. in 1971.

== Career ==
Wayne Haylen was admitted to the Bar in 1976 and practiced as a barrister in Sydney (14th Floor Wardell Chambers), H.B. Higgins Chambers and Denman Chambers until 2001.

He also had Chambers in Melbourne (Evatt Floor, Douglas Menzies Chambers) and has been admitted in Victoria, Queensland and Western Australia. In 1990 he was admitted to the Inner Bar (NSW).

At the Bar his main areas of practise were Industrial Law; Administrative Law; Anti-Discrimination and Legal Professional Standards & Discipline.

Haylen J became a Judge of the Industrial Court of New South Wales in 2001, he is also a Deputy President Member, Industrial Court of NSW.

Haylen J was appointed by the NSW Attorney-General, John Hatzistergos to part-time deputy president of the Administrative Decisions Tribunal and head of the tribunal's legal services division in 2008.

== Family and social matters ==
He married Joan Evatt in 1973 and they have a son and daughter. Haylen's recreational interests include racing, golf, racehorse breeding, and theatre.

== Positions and memberships ==
Haylen is a member of the following:

- Racing Appeals Tribunal 2002–present
- Harness Racing Appeals Tribunal 2003–present
- Greyhound Racing Appeals Tribunal 2003–present
- Racing Appeals Panel
- NSW Thoroughbred Racing Board 1997–2001
- Australian Consumers Association 1978–1994, chairman 1988–1994
- Local Government Minister's Reform Task Force 1996–1999
- NSW Privacy Committee 1981–1993
- NSW Consumers Advisory Council established under the Consumer Protection Act and appointed by the Minister to represent the interests of consumers 1978–82
- Chairman & Trustee National Jockeys Trust 2020–present

== Honours ==
- 1967 Certificate of Appreciation from the Commissioner of Police re the apprehension of a person convicted of shooting with intent to murder Rt Hon A. A. Calwell, Leader of the Opposition
- 1977 Recipient of Queen's Silver Jubilee Medal

== Professional publications ==
- Editorial Board: "Human Resources Law Bulletin" (1996–2001)
- Co-Editor: "Mills – Federal Industrial Law" with M Moore
- Consultant: "Mills – Federal Industrial Law" (1980–1981)
- Reporter: "Australian Law Reports" (1976–1979)
