= Wayne Davis (philosopher) =

American philosopher (born 1951)

- Born: 1951 (age 74–75)

Education
- Education: Princeton University (PhD), University of Michigan (BA)

Philosophical work
- Era: 21st-century philosophy
- Region: Western philosophy
- Institutions: Georgetown University
- Main interests: philosophy of mind, philosophy of language, epistemology, logic

Wayne A. Davis (born 1951) is an American philosopher and Professor Emeritus of Philosophy at Georgetown University. He is known for his works on philosophy of mind and philosophy of language.

== Books ==
- Meaning, Expression, and Thought, Cambridge, 2002, ISBN 0521555132.
- Irregular Negations, Implicature, and Idioms. Springer, 2016.
- An Introduction to Logic, 3rd Edition. Kunos Press, 2011.
- Implicature: Intention, Convention, and Principle in the Failure of Gricean Theory (Paperback). Cambridge University Press, 2007.
- Nondescriptive Meaning and Reference. Oxford: Oxford University Press, 2005.
- Implicature: Intention, Convention, and Principle in the Failure of Gricean Theory. Cambridge: Cambridge University Press, 1998.
- Study Guide to An Introduction to Logic. Prentice-Hall, 1986.
