= List of Jamaican representative cricketers =

List of cricketers

This is a list of all cricketers who have played first-class, List A or Twenty20 cricket for the Jamaica national cricket team in the West Indies. Seasons given are first and last seasons; the player did not necessarily play in all the intervening seasons.

== A ==
- Sidney Abrahams, 1938–1951/52
- Edward Acton, 1894/95–1896/97
- Jimmy Adams, 1984/85–2000/01
- Donald Aitcheson, 1946
- Gerry Alexander, 1956/57–1959/60
- Fabian Allen, 2016/17–2018/19
- Samuel Allen, 1975/76
- Owen Allison, 1972/73
- Anthony Andrews, 1992/93–1995/96
- Melbourne Austin, 1989/90 (Note: Austin played in a single List A match for Jamaica in the 1989/90 season. No biographical details are known.)
- Richard Austin, 1974/75–1982/83

== B ==
- Cleveland Bailey, 1946–1947/48
- GM Baines, 1901/02 (Note: Baines played in two first-class matches for Jamaica in the 1901/02 season. No biographical details are known.)
- Orlando Baker, 2000/01
- Clive Banton, 1988/89–1989/90
- Kanute Barclay, 1954/55–1961/62
- Kenneth Barnett, 1965/66
- Arthur Barrett, 1966/67–1980/81
- Hopeton Barrett, 1983/84–1986
- Ivan Barrow, 1928/29–1946
- Carlton Baugh Sr., 1980/81–1982/83
- Carlton Baugh Jr., 2000/01–2015/16
- Alton Beckford, 2005/06
- Donald Beckford, 1931/32–1946/47
- Wilfred Beckford, 1926/27–1935/36
- Rohan Belight, 1994/95
- Herman Bennett, 1964/65–1969/70
- David Bernard, 2000–2015/16
- Henry Bicknell, 1926/27
- Alfred Binns, 1949/50–1956/57
- Michael Binns, 1926/27
- Jermaine Blackwood, 2011/12–2019/20
- Cyprian Bloomfield, 1925/26
- Colin Bloomfield, 1946/47–1947/48
- Arthur Bonitto, 1946–1951/52
- Colin Bonitto, 1946–1952/53
- Neville Bonitto, 1947/48–1956/57
- Nkrumah Bonner, 2009/10–2019/20
- Carl Boy, 1931/32–1935/36
- Gareth Breese, 1995/96–2005/06
- Frank Bronstorph, 1925/26
- Bevon Brown, 2003/04–2010/11
- Errol Brown, 1977/78–1984/85
- Gavon Brown, 2014/15–2016/17
- Odean Brown, 2003/04–2014/15
- Gordon Bryan, 2017/18–2019/20
- P Bryan, 1976/77 (Note: Bryan played in a single List A match for Jamaica in the 1976/77 season. No biographical details are known.)
- Brian Buchanan, 2012/13–2013/14
- Dennis Bulli, 2015/16–2019/20
- Edward Burke, 1894/95
- Charles Burton, 1894/95–1905
- Cassius Burton, 2014/15
- Shimei Burton, 1995/96–1996/97
- Arthur Byng, 1896/97

== C ==
- Edwin Calnick, 1957/58–1958
- Jimmy Cameron, 1946–1959/60
- John Cameron, 1946
- John Joseph Cameron, 1908/09–1927/28
- Clive Campbell, 1971/72
- Anthony Campbell, 1969/70–1979/80
- Herbert Campbell, 1925/26–1926/27
- John Campbell, 2012/13–2019/20
- Jon-Ross Campbell, 2009/10–2014/15
- Carlton Carter, 1988/89–1989/90
- Stephan Casey, 2017/18
- Harold Castle, 1894/95–1896/97
- Clifton Cawley, 1938
- Leonard Chambers, 1965/66–1974/75
- Charles Chandler, 1894/95–1896/97
- Herbert Chang, 1972/73–1982/83
- SC Chisholm, 1925/26-1926/27 (Note: Chisholm played in five first-class matches for Jamaica in the 1925/26 and 1926/27 seasons. No biographical details are known.)
- Maurice Clarke, 2004/05
- Rudolph Cohen, 1962/63–1966/67
- Andre Coley, 1997/98–1998/99
- Terrence Corke, 1983/84–1984/85
- Sheldon Cottrell, 2010/11–2015/16
- George Cox, 1904/05–1905
- Linval Crawford, 1987/88
- O'Neil Cruikshank, 1990/91–1991/92
- Wayne Cuff, 1995/96–2001/02
- Frank Cunningham, 1985/86–1987/88
- Lawrence Cunningham, 1985/86–1987/88
- Oswald Cunningham, 1938–1950/51
- Ryan Cunningham, 1998/99–2003/04

== D ==
- Oscar Da Costa, 1928/29–1934/35
- Aaron Daley, 1982/83–1990/91
- Courtenay Daley, 1971/72–1975/76
- Cleveland Davidson, 1982/83–1993/94
- Winston Davis, 1962/63–1971/72
- Jason Dawes, 2008/09–2017/18
- Cecil De Cordova, 1896/97
- Charles Delgado, 1910/11
- Kenrick Dennis, 1986/87–1987/88
- Kamal Dennis, 2000
- Akeem Dewar, 2009/10–2010/11
- Tom Dewdney, 1954/55–1957/58
- Deron Dixon, 1984/85–1988/89
- Uton Dowe, 1969/70–1976/77
- Byron Drury, 1896/97
- Arthur Duff, 1904/05–1905
- Leroy Dujon, 1946/47
- Jeff Dujon, 1974/75–1992/93
- Henry Duncker, 1904/05–1910/11
- Andre Dwyer, 2006/07

== E ==
- Kirk Ebanks, 1991/92–1992/93
- Kirk Edwards, 2015/16
- Yannick Elliott, 2008/09–2012/13

== F ==
- William Farquharson, 1894/95–1896/97
- Walter Farquharson, 1887/88–1894/95
- Raymond Ferguson, 1998/99
- Laurie Fidee, 1947/48
- Shawn Findlay, 2003/04–2011/12
- Colin Fletcher, 1978/79–1982/83
- Castell Folkes, 1967/68–1970/71
- Clifton Folkes, 1990/91–1992/93
- Shane Ford, 1993/94–1998/99
- Frederick Foster, 1901/02–1924/25
- Gerald Foster, 1908/09–1925/26
- Maurice Foster, 1963/64–1977/78
- Robert Foster, 1910/11
- Zeniffe Fowler, 2012/13
- Prince Francis, 1982/83–1987/88
- Samuel Francis, 1977/78
- Victor Fray, 1966/67–1969/70
- Akim Frazer, 2018/19
- Michael Frederick, 1953/54
- Assad Fudadin, 2017/18–2019/20
- Hugh Fuller, 1949/50
- Dickie Fuller, 1934/35–1946/47

== G ==
- Leon Garrick, 1996/97–2002/03
- Garth Garvey, 2017/18–2018/19
- Chris Gayle, 1998/99–2018/19
- Patrick Gayle, 1988/89–1993/94
- JM Gibb, 1887/88-1904/05 (Note: Gibb played in four first-class matches for Jamaica from 1894 to 1897. No biographical details are known.)
- Marlon Gibbs, 1995/96–1996/97
- Roy Gilchrist, 1956/57–1961/62
- Alford Givance, 1992/93
- George Gladstone, 1929/30
- Locksley Gooden, 1946/47–1947/48
- Stanley Goodridge, 1949/50–1953/54
- Colin Gordon, 1982/83
- Carlton Gordon, 1978/79
- Hylton Gordon, 1973/74–1979/80
- John Gordon, 1976/77–1983/84
- Nicholson Gordon, 2015/16–2019/20
- Steve Gordon, 1987/88–1993/94
- Steve Gordon, 1988/89
- Tyson Gordon, 2004/05
- Gary Graham, 2004/05
- Joe Grant, 1990/91–1995/96
- Derval Green, 2014/15–2019/20
- Teddy Griffith, 1959/60–1966/67
- Trevon Griffith, 2015/16–2017/18
- John Groves, 1931/32–1949/50
- Geoffrey Gunter, 1905

== H ==
- V Hardy, 1927/28 (Note: Hardy played in four first-class matches for Jamaica in the 1927/28 season. No biographical details are known.)
- Tevin Hall 2013/2014
- Howard Harris, 1998/99
- Olanza Harris, 2004/05
- Jermaine Harrison, 2015/16
- Paul Harrison, 2017/18
- Patrick Harty, 2019/20
- Ferdie Harvey, 1959/60–1966/67
- Neville Hawkins, 1963/64–1966/67
- William Haye, 1970–1976/77
- Robert Haynes, 1981/82–1996/97
- Clinton Headlam, 1957/58–1958
- George Headley, 1927/28–1953/54
- Ron Headley, 1965/66–1973/74
- Robert Healing, 1896/97
- Jackie Hendriks, 1953/54–1970
- Trevor Henry, 1975–1976/77
- Robert Herbert, 1896/97
- George Heron, 1985/86–1987/88
- Keith Hibbert, 2000–2008/09
- Wavell Hinds, 1996/97–2010/11
- Edward Hobson, 1905
- Michael Holding, 1972/73–1988/89
- Joseph Holt, 1905–1929/30
- John Holt, 1946–1961/62
- Robert Honiball, 1896/97
- Neil Hosang, 1974/75
- Edward Hull, 1901/02–1910/11
- Charles Hurditch, 1894/95
- Joseph Hutton, 1901/02 (Note: Hutton played in three first-class matches for Jamaica in the 1901/02 season. No biographical details are known.)
- Robert Hutton, 1904/05–1908/09 (Note: Hutton played in nine first-class matches for Jamaica from 1904/05 to 1908/09. No biographical details are known.)
- Danza Hyatt, 2003/04–2014/15
- Leslie Hylton, 1926/27–1938/39

== I ==
- Irvin Iffla, 1947/48–1949/50
- Lorenzo Ingram, 2003/04–2008/09

== J ==
- Simon Jackson, 2010/11–2012/13
- Damion Jacobs, 2013/14–2017/18
- Hines Johnson, 1934/35–1950/51
- Milton Josephs, 1959/60–1961/62

== K ==
- Henry Kennedy, 1904/05–1910/11
- Nigel Kennedy, 1987/88–1989/90
- Esmond Kentish, 1947/48–1956/57
- Maurice Kepple, 2002/03–2004/05
- Henry Kerr, 1904/05–1905
- Malcolm Kerr, 1901/02–1910/11
- Brandon King, 2014/15–2019/20
- Lester King, 1961/62–1967/68

== L ==
- Tamar Lambert, 2000–2015/16
- Christopher Lamont, 2017/18–2019/20
- Ambrose Lawrence, 1924/25 (Note: Lawrence played in a single first-class match for Jamaica in the 1924/25 season. No biographical details are known.)
- Cecil Lawson, 1971/72–1977/78
- Jermaine Lawson, 2001/02–2007/08
- Reynard Leveridge, 2016/17–2018/19
- Jermaine Levy, 2018/19
- Leonard Levy, 1961/62–1973/74
- Desmond Lewis, 1970–1975/76
- Frank Lewis, 1956/57–1958
- Kennar Lewis, 2011/12–2018/19
- Ramaal Lewis, 2014/15
- Wayne Lewis, 1984/85–1994/95
- George Linton, 1896/97–1901/02
- Gilbert Livingston, 1896/97–1904/05
- Leroy Lugg, 2021/22
- Vincent Lumsden, 1949/50–1959/60

== M ==
- Andre McCarthy, 2012–2019/20
- Roy McCatty, 1968/69–1969/70
- Vincent McCormack, 1925/26
- Sidney McCutchin, 1894/95
- Evon McInnis, 2003/04–2004/05
- Arthur McKenzie, 1946/47–1947/48
- Brenton McKenzie, 1984/85
- Denville McKenzie, 1995/96–2000/01
- Neville Mckoy, 1970/71–1972/73
- Ken McLeod, 1983/84–1987/88
- John McLeod, 1951/52–1952/53
- N MacMahon, 1927/28 (Note: MacMahon played in a single first-class match for Jamaica in the 1927/28 season. No biographical details are known.)
- Easton McMorris, 1956/57–1975
- Dwight Mais, 1998/99–2003/04
- Donovan Malcolm, 1980/81–1981/82
- Robert Maragh, 1956/57–1962/63
- Robert Marley, 1928/29–1946
- Kemar Marshall, 2009/10
- Xavier Marshall, 2004/05–2012/13
- Frank Martin, 1924/25–1929/30
- Lawson Matthews, 1962/63–1965/66
- Everton Mattis, 1976/77–1982/83
- Warran Medwynter, 2001/02
- Dwight Meikle, 1984/85 (Note: Meikle played in a single List A match for Jamaica in the 1984/85 season. No biographical details are known.)
- Hiram Meikle, 1938
- Jamie Merchant, 2012/13–2019/20
- Thomas Mercier, 1910/11–1925/26
- Leonard Messado, 1938/39
- Othneil Miles, 1967/68–1975/76
- Donald Miller, 1961/62
- Horace Miller, 2008/09–2014/15
- Nikita Miller, 2004/05–2018/19
- Roy Miller, 1950/51–1953/54
- Marquino Mindley, 2014/15–2019/20
- Calbert Minott, 1952/53–1954/55
- Owen Mitchell, 1961/62–1964/65
- Charles Morales, 1924/25–1928/29
- Alexander Morgan, 1983/84
- Dean Morgan, 2006–2010
- Delroy Morgan, 1986/87–1999/00
- Lloyd Morgan, 1968/69–1972/73
- Samuel Morgan, 1969/70–1973/74
- Romaine Morrison, 2017/18
- Charles Morrison, 1904/05–1925/26
- Alfred Motta, 1904/05–1908/09
- M Moyston, 1904/05–1908/09 (Note: Moyston played in six first-class matches for Jamaica from 1904/05 to 1908/09. No biographical details are known.)
- George Mudie, 1931/32–1951/52
- Joseph Mullings, 1894/95–1896/97
- Leonard Mullings, 1954/55–1959/60
- Brian Murphy, 1993/94–2001/02

== N ==
- Brendan Nash, 2007/08–2011/12
- Mark Neita, 1978/79–1991/92
- Wallwood Nelson, 1904/05–1908/09
- Noel Nethersole, 1926/27–1938
- Thomas Nicholson, 1908/09–1910/11
- Karl Nunes, 1924/25–1931/32

== O ==
- Courtney O'Connor, 1986/87–1987/88
- Sydney Owen, 1896/97

== P ==
- Donovan Pagon, 2002/03–2012
- Dixeth Palmer, 1990/91–1994/95
- Paul Palmer, 2015/16–2019/20
- Brenton Parchment, 2000–2012/13
- Hume Parris, 1961/62
- Clarence Passailaigue, 1929/30–1938/39
- Patrick Patterson, 1982/83–1997/98
- Roy Paul, 1971/72
- Frank Pearce, 1887/88–1908/09
- George Pearce, 1887/88–1894/95
- Orville Pennant, 1993/94–1994/95
- Nehemiah Perry, 1986/87–2003/04
- Ordelmo Peters, 1982/83–1989/90
- Louis Phillips, 1904/05–1908/09
- Raymond Phillips, 1925/26–1927/28
- Renford Pinnock, 1963/64–1974/75
- Wilfred Plummer, 1978/79
- CF Poole, 1896/97 (Note: Poole played in five first-class matches for Jamaica in the 1896/97 season. No biographical details are known.)
- Ernest Poole, 1896/97
- Aston Powe, 1947/48
- Daren Powell, 2000/01–2009/10
- George Powell, 1981/82–1987/88
- Kirk Powell, 1996/97–1998/99
- Rovman Powell, 2015/16–2019/20
- Ricardo Powell, 1997/98–2003/04
- Sheldon Powell, 2006/07
- Tony Powell, 1991/92–1999/00
- John Prescod, 1947/48–1952/53
- Harold Pryce, 1954/55

== R ==
- Allan Rae, 1946/47–1959/60
- Ernest Rae, 1924/25–1935/36
- Errol Rattigan, 1973/74
- Frederick Redwood, 1991/92–1995/96
- Horace Reid, 1961/62–1963/64
- O'Neil Richards, 1995/96–1998/99
- Andrew Richardson, 2003/04–2013/14
- Daniel Richmond, 1896/97
- Ken Rickards, 1946–1958
- Rueben Riley, 1925/26–1935/36 (Note: Riley played in five first-class matches for Jamaica from 1925/26 to 1935/36. No biographical details are known.)
- Gladstone Robinson, 1963/64–1964/65
- Franklyn Rose, 1992/93–2002/03
- Lawrence Rowe, 1968/69–1982/83
- Ralph Royes, 1931/32
- Andre Russell, 2006/07–2017/18

== S ==
- Pete Salmon, 2017/18–2019/20
- Marlon Samuels, 1996/97–2013/14
- Robert Samuels, 1988/89–2003/04
- Trevor Samuels, 1987/88
- Audley Sanson, 1998/99–2002/03
- Krishmar Santokie, 2007/08–2012/13
- Vernon Sasso, 1929/30–1931/32
- Luther Saunders, 1950/51–1951/52
- Ronald Savariau, 1976/77
- Bob Scarlett, 1963/64
- Reginald Scarlett, 1951/52–1959/60
- Alfred Scott, 1952/53–1953/54
- Tommy Scott, 1910/11–1934/35
- Damani Sewell, 2016/17–2017/18
- Henry Sewell, 1957/58–1959/60
- H Shannon, 1904/05–1910/11 (Note: Shannon played in eight first-class matches for Jamaica from 1904/05 to 1910/11. No biographical details are known.)
- Robert Sidgwick, 1894/95
- Allan Silvera, 1924/25
- Donovan Sinclair, 2006–2008/09
- Matthew Sinclair, 1998/99–2003/04
- Denis Smith, 2019/20
- Frank Smith, 1938–1938/39 (Note: Smith played in three first-class matches for Jamaica in the 1938 and 1938/39 seasons. No biographical details are known.)
- George Smith, 1956/57
- Odean Smith, 2017/18
- Collie Smith, 1954/55–1957/58
- Samuel Snow, 1901/02–1910/11
- Richard Staple, 1989/90–1994/95
- Osmond Stephenson, 1927/28–1938/39
- Rae Stephenson, 1979/80
- Dwight Stewart, 2004/05
- Raymond Stewart, 2000
- AL Stoddart, 1904/05 (Note: Stoddart played in two first-class matches for Jamaica in the 1904/05 season. No biographical details are known.)

== T ==
- Arthur Tarilton, 1904/05
- William Tarver, 1901/02
- Jerome Taylor, 2002/03–2018/19
- Rohan Taylor, 1990/91–1991/92
- Steven Taylor, 2016/17–2017/18
- Aldane Thomas, 2012/13–2019/20
- Devon Thomas, 2015/16–2016/17
- Oshane Thomas, 2016/17–2019/20
- Shacaya Thomas, 2014/15–2016/17
- Clement Thompson, 1976/77–1984/85
- Dennis Thorbourne, 1949/50–1958
- Percival Tomlinson, 1980/81
- John Toone, 1894/95
- Jamie Trenchfield, 2006/07
- Marlon Tucker, 1979/80–1989/90
- Horace Tulloch, 1951/52–1961/62

== U ==
- Samuel Uter, 1910/11

== V ==
- Charles Valencia, 1901/02–1904/05
- Alf Valentine, 1949/50–1964/65
- Vincent Valentine, 1931/32–1938
- Mario Ventura, 1992/93–2003/04
- Bertie Verley, 1894/95–1896/97

== W ==
- Gavin Wallace, 2008/09–2017/18
- Keno Wallace, 2014/15
- Courtney Walsh, 1981/82–2000/01
- Chadwick Walton, 2010/11–2018/19
- Dwight Washington, 2004/05–2005/06
- Chester Watson, 1957/58–1961/62
- Ken Weekes, 1938–1947/48
- Altemont Wellington, 1965/66–1968/69
- Livern Wellington, 1969/70–1970/71
- Everett Whittingham, 1975–1984/85
- Alwyn Williams, 2017/18–2019/20
- Basil Williams, 1969/70–1986
- Junior Williams, 1974/75–1982/83
- Kenroy Williams, 2018/19
- Lloyd Williams, 1957/58
- Laurie Williams, 1989/90–2002/03
- Medroy Williams, 1984/85
- N Williams, 1983/84 (Note: Williams played in a single List A match for Jamaica in the 1983/84 season. No biographical details are known.)
- Oraine Williams, 2016/17–2019/20
- Walford Williams, 1979/80
- Errol Wilson, 1982/83–1990/91
- Francis Wilson, 1904/05–1905
- G Withers, 1901/02 (Note: Withers played in three first-class matches for Jamaica in the 1901/02 season. No biographical details are known.)
- Gerald Woollaston, 1957/58–1967/68
- Frank Worrell, 1947/48–1963/64
- Carl Wright, 1997/98–1999/00
- Edward Wright, 1901/02
- K Wright, 1998/99 (Note: Wright played in a single List A match for Jamaica in the 1998/99 season. No biographical details are known.)
- Lyndel Wright, 1968/69–1978/79
- Samuel Wright, 1958
- Ray Wynter, 1975–1982/83

== Y ==
- Hubert Young, 1931/32
- Samuel Young, 1924/25–1927/28
