= Indian cricket team in the West Indies in 1982–83 =

Indian cricket team in West Indies in 1982–83
- Date: 17 February – 3 May 1983
- Location: (Cricket West Indies) West Indies
- Result: West Indies won the 5-Test series 2–0
- Player of the series: Mohinder Amarnath (Ind)
Teams
- West Indies: India
Captains
- Clive Lloyd: Kapil Dev
Most runs
- Clive Lloyd (407) Gordon Greenidge (393) Desmond Haynes (333): Mohinder Amarnath (598); Dilip Vengsarkar (279); Kapil Dev (254)
Most wickets
- Andy Roberts (24) Malcolm Marshall (21) Michael Holding (12): Kapil Dev (17); Ravi Shastri (10); Venkataraghavan (10)

The India national cricket team toured the West Indies during the 1982–83 cricket season. They played five Test matches against the West Indian cricket team, with the West Indies winning the series 2–0.

== Tour matches ==
=== Four-day: Jamaica v Indians ===
17–20 February 1983
Scorecard

| Indians | v | Jamaica |
| 185 (64 overs); Dilip Vengsarkar 42; Courtney Walsh 4/31 (12 overs) | | 306 (112.5 overs); Jeff Dujon 104; Mohinder Amarnath 4/26 (10 overs) |
| 395/6d (130 overs); Anshuman Gaekwad 89; Mark Neita 2/43 (21 overs) | | 71/4 (31 overs); Colin Fletcher; Kapil Dev 2/11 (8 overs) |

Match drawn
Sabina Park, Kingston
Umpires: Antonio Gaynor and W Malcolm

- Indians won the toss and decided to bat.
- Prince Francis, Aaron Daley and Errol Wilson (Jamaica) made their first-class debuts.

=== Four-day: Trinidad and Tobago v Indians ===
3–6 March 1983
Scorecard

| Trinidad and Tobago | v | Indians |
| 193 (62.1 overs); Phil Simmons 81; Maninder Singh 5/48 (21 overs) | | 403 (135.5 overs); Mohinder Amarnath 114; Ganesh Mahabir 4/71 (27.5 overs) |
| 141 (43.2 overs); Richard S. Gabriel 30; Maninder Singh 7/47 (18.2 overs) |

Indians won by an innings and 69 runs
Guaracara Park, Pointe-à-Pierre, Trinidad and Tobago
Umpires: Clarence Shaffralli and Sadique Mohammed

- Trinidad and Tobago won the toss and elected to bat.

== Test matches ==
=== 1st Test ===
23–28 February
Scorecard

| India | v | West Indies |
| 251 (87.4 overs); Balwinder Sandhu 68; Andy Roberts 4/61 (22 overs) | | 254 (116.3 overs); Gordon Greenidge 70 (249); Ravi Shastri 4/43 (24 overs) |
| 174 (85.3 overs); Mohinder Amarnath 40; Andy Roberts 5/39 (24.3 overs) | | 173/6 (25.2 overs); Viv Richards 61 (36); Kapil Dev 4/73 (13 overs) |

West Indies won by 4 wickets
Sabina Park, Kingston
Umpires: David Archer (WIN) and Wesley Malcolm (WIN)
Player of the match: Andy Roberts (WIN)

- West Indies won the toss and decided to field
- Gus Logie (WIN) made his Test debut.
- Kapil Dev (Ind) passed 2,000 runs in tests.

=== 2nd Test ===
11–16 March
scorecard

| India | v | West Indies |
| 175 (66.1 overs); Mohinder Amarnath 58; Malcolm Marshall 5/37 (19.1 overs) | | 394 (138.3 overs); Clive Lloyd 143; Kapil Dev 3/91 (31 overs) |
| 469/7 (139.1 overs); Mohinder Amarnath 117; Andy Roberts 2/100 (25 overs) |

Match drawn
Queen's Park Oval, Port of Spain
Umpires: Sadique Mohammed (WIN) and Stanton Parris (WIN)
Player of the match: Mohinder Amarnath (Ind)

- West Indies won the toss and decided to field
- 14 March was a rest day.
- Kapil Dev (Ind) claimed his 200th wicket in Tests.

=== 3rd Test ===
31 March–5 April
Scorecard

| West Indies | v | India |
| 470 (142.4 overs); Viv Richards 109; Balwinder Sandhu 3/87 (25.4 overs) | | 284/3 (79 overs); Sunil Gavaskar 147; Malcolm Marshall 1/39 (13 overs) |

Match drawn
Bourda, Georgetown
Umpires: David Archer (WIN) and David Narine (WIN)

- West Indies won the toss and decided to bat

=== 4th Test ===
15–20 April
Scorecard

| India | v | West Indies |
| 209 (57.2 overs); Mohinder Amarnath 91; Andy Roberts 4/48 (16 overs) | | 486 (158.2 overs); Gus Logie 130; Kapil Dev 3/76 (32.2 overs) |
| 277 (79.2 overs); Mohinder Amarnath 80; Andy Roberts 4/31 (19.2 overs) | | 1/0 (0.1 overs) |

West Indies won by 10 wickets
Kensington Oval, Bridgetown
Umpires: David Archer (WIN) and Stanton Parris (WIN)
Player of the match: Mohinder Amarnath (Ind)

- West Indies won the toss and decided to field

=== 5th Test ===
28 April–3 May
Scorecard

| India | v | West Indies |
| 457 (126.5 overs); Ravi Shastri 102; Malcolm Marshall 4/87 (27.5 overs) | | 550 (166.4 overs); Gordon Greenidge 154*; Madan Lal 3/105 (35 overs) |
| 247/5 d. (88 overs); Mohinder Amarnath 116; Malcolm Marshall 2/33 (18 overs) |

Match drawn
Antigua Recreation Ground, St John's
Umpires: David Archer (WIN) and Andrew Weekes
Player of the match: Gordon Greenidge (WIN)

- West Indies won the toss and decided to field
- Laxman Sivaramakrishnan (Ind) and Winston Davis (WIN) made their Test debuts.
- It was only the fifth time in Tests that four or more batsmen had passed three figures in a single innings.
- Gordon Greenidge retired in the West Indian first innings to see his dying daughter. Out of respect, an exception to the Laws of Cricket was made to classify Greenidge as "retired not out" for this innings.

== ODI matches ==
The West Indies won the series 2–1.

=== 1st ODI ===
9 March 1983
Scorecard

| West Indies; 215/4 (38.5 overs) | v | India; 163/7 (39 overs) |
| Desmond Haynes 97 (104); Kapil Dev 2/21 (6.5 overs) | | Dilip Vengsarkar 27 (26); Larry Gomes 3/50 (9 overs) |

West Indies won by 52 runs
Queen's Park Oval, Port of Spain, Trinidad
Umpires: David Narine (WI) and Andrew Weekes (WI)
Player of the match: Desmond Haynes (WI)

- India won the toss and elected to field.
- The match was reduced before play started from 50 overs to 45 overs per side.
- The match was further reduced to 38.5 overs per side. India's overs allocation were increased to 39 overs due to the slow over rate of the West Indies.

=== 2nd ODI ===
29 March 1983
Scorecard

| India; 282/5 (47 overs) | v | West Indies; 255/9 (47 overs) |
| Sunil Gavaskar 90 (117); Malcolm Marshall 1/23 (7 overs) | | Viv Richards 64 (51); Ravi Shastri 3/48 (8 overs) |

India won by 27 runs
Albion Sports Complex, Albion, Guyana
Umpires: David Archer (WI) and Mohamed Baksh (WI)
Player of the match: Kapil Dev (Ind)

- West Indies won the toss and elected to field.
- The match was reduced from 50 overs to 47 overs per side.
- Winston Davis (WI) made his ODI debut.

=== 3rd ODI ===
7 April 1983
Scorecard

| India; 166 (44.4 overs) | v | West Indies; 167/3 (40.2 overs) |
| Dilip Vengsarkar 54 (59); Larry Gomes 4/38 (10 overs) | | Gordon Greenidge 64 (95); Ravi Shastri 1/10 (5 overs) |

West Indies won by 7 wickets
Queen's Park (old ground), St. George's, Grenada
Umpires: Stanton Parris (WI) and Pat Whyte (WI)
Player of the match: Gordon Greenidge (WI)

- West Indies won the toss and elected to field.
