= George Powell =

George Powell may refer to:

- George Powell (MP) (fl. 1597), for Downton
- George Powell (playwright) (1668–1714), London actor and playwright
- George Gabriel Powell (1710–1779), acting governor of St Helena, and politician in South Carolina
- George Powell (sealer) (1794–1824), English seal hunter and Antarctic explorer
- George E. J. Powell (1842–1882), British translator of Icelandic literature and owner of the Nanteos Cup
- George Powell (golfer) (1869–1927), American golfer
- George Henry Powell (1880–1951), British songwriter
- Gap Powell (George A. Powell, 1898–1989), American football player for Oregon State University
- George Powell (Australian cricketer) (1918–1994), Australian cricketer
- George Powell (Jamaican cricketer) (born 1955), Jamaican cricketer
- George Powell (footballer) (1924–1989), footballer with QPR
- George Powell (musician), member of the American band Pure Prairie League
- George B. Powell (1900–1967), American football coach
- George Powell (British Army officer) (1883–1961), British Army officer and MP

== See also ==
- George Baden-Powell (1847–1898), British Member of Parliament and Arctic explorer
- George Powell-Shedden (1916–1994), Royal Air Force pilot, United Kingdom
