= Dujon =

Dujon is a surname and male given name. Notable people with this name include:

- Bernard Dujon (born 1947), French geneticist
- Dujon Sterling (born 1999), English football player
- Jeff Dujon (born 1956), West Indian cricket player
- Leroy Dujon (1918–1967), Jamaican cricket player

== Other uses ==
- Dujon Dujonar, is a 1999 Bangladeshi film starring Shakib Khan
