= Frank Lewis =

Frank Lewis may refer to:

== Sports ==
- Frank Lewis (American football) (born 1947), American NFL wide receiver
- Frank Lewis (baseball), American baseball player
- Frank Lewis (cricketer) (born 1933), Jamaican cricketer
- Frank Lewis (wrestler) (1912–1998), American Olympic wrestler

== Others ==
- Frank Lewis (broadcaster) (born 1939), Canadian broadcaster and lieutenant governor of Prince Edward Island
- Frank Lewis (Nebraska politician) (born 1939), American politician from Nebraska
- Frank Beckett Lewis, English architect
- Frank Harlan Lewis (1919–2008), American botanist
- Frank L. Lewis, American electrical engineer, academic and researcher
- Frank W. Lewis (1912–2010), American cryptographer and crossword compiler

== See also ==
- Francis Lewis (disambiguation)
