= Edward Burke =

Edward Burke may refer to:

== Government and politics ==
- Edward A. Burke (1839–1928), Louisiana state treasurer
- Edward T. Burke (1870–1935), North Dakota Supreme Court justice
- Edward J. Burke (1876–1935), Wisconsin legislator
- Edward R. Burke (1880–1968), American politician
- Edward H. Burke (1886–1955), American politician and lawyer
- Edward M. Burke (born 1943), Chicago, Illinois alderman
- Edward L. Burke (1899–1982), public official in Vermont

== Sports ==
- Eddie Burke (baseball) (1866–1907), American baseball player
- Edward Burke (American football) (1907–1967), selected to the 1928 College Football All-America Team
- Edward Burke (cricketer) (born 1870), Jamaican cricketer
- Ed Burke (hammer thrower) (born 1940), hammer thrower, American flagbearer at 1984 Olympic games
- Edward Burke (basketball) (1945–2009), American basketball coach
- Ted Burke (1877–1967), Australian rules footballer
- Ed Burke (high jumper), winner of the high jump at the 1937 USA Indoor Track and Field Championships

== Others ==
- Edward Burke (priest) (1847–1915), priest, president of Carlow College, and founder of St. Joseph's Academy
- Ed Burke (musician) (1909–1988), American musician

== See also ==
- Edmund Burke (disambiguation)
- Edward C. Burks (1821–1897), American jurist
