= Francis Wilson =

Francis Wilson may refer to the following people:

== Military and politics ==
- Francis Wilson (political scientist) (1901–1976)
- Francis A. Wilson (c. 1840–1888), American soldier and Medal of Honor recipient
- Francis Adrian Wilson (1874–1954), British Army officer
- Francis Ford Wilson (1865–1919), Australian politician
- Francis H. Wilson (1844–1910), U.S. Representative from New York
- Francis Ormond Wilson (born 1946), diplomat of New Zealand
- Francis Stuart Wilson (1883–1915), Royal Marines officer and pilot, also a first-class cricketer in Jamaica

== Science ==
- Francis Wilson (lichenologist) (1832–1903), Australian lichenologist
- Francis Wilson (meteorologist) (born 1949), British weather forecaster
- Francis Erasmus Wilson (1888–1960), Australian scientist who named Manorina melanotis, or black-eared miner, a species of bird

== Sports ==
- Francis Wilson (English cricketer) (1876–1964), British Army officer, also a first-class cricketer in England
- Francis Wilson (footballer) (1848–1886), English footballer who appeared in the 1875 FA Cup Final
- Francis Wilson (rugby union) (1876–?), British rugby union player who competed in the 1900 Summer Olympics
- Francis Stuart Wilson (1883–1915), Royal Marines officer and pilot, also a first-class cricketer in Jamaica

== Other ==
- Francis Wilson (actor) (1854–1935), American actor
- Francis Wilson (economist) (1939–2022), South African economist
- Francis Gordon Wilson (1900–1959), New Zealand architect
- Francis S. Wilson (1872–1951), American jurist
- Francis W. Wilson (1870–1947), American architect

== See also ==
- Frank Wilson (disambiguation)
- Frances Wilson (disambiguation)
