= Maurice Clarke =

Maurice Clark or Clarke may refer to:

- Maurice B. Clark (1827–1901), American businessman
- Maurice Clarke (cricketer) (born 1981), Jamaican cricketer
- Maurice Clarke (priest), Anglican archdeacon in India
- Maurice Gordon Clarke (1877–?), American football and baseball player and coach
