= Mullings =

Mullings is a surname. Notable people with this surname include:

- Daniel Mullings (born 1991), Canadian basketball player
- Darren Mullings (born 1987), English semi-professional football player
- Devin Mullings (born 1985), Bahamian tennis player
- Emma Mullings, Australian television presenter, radio announcer, singer, actor, writer and producer
- Frank Mullings (1881–1953), English tenor
- John Mullings Aldridge (1843–1920), Irish priest
- Joseph Mullings (1792–1859), British politician
- Joseph Mullings (cricketer) (born 1874, date of death unknown), Jamaican cricket player
- Keith Mullings (1968–2021), Jamaican boxer
- Leith Mullings (1945–2020), American author, anthropologist and professor
- Leonard Mullings (born 1929), Jamaican cricket player
- Patrick Mullings (born 1970), English amateur boxer
- Seymour Mullings OJ CD (1931–2013), Jamaican politician
- Shamir Mullings (born 1993), English football player
- Steve Mullings (born 1982), Jamaican sprinter
