= Trevor Henry (disambiguation) =

Trevor Henry (1902–2007) was a New Zealand jurist.

Trevor Henry may also refer to:

- Trevor Henry (cricketer) (born 1947), Jamaican cricketer
- Trevor Henry (umpire) (1954–2006), Irish cricket umpire
