= George Heron (disambiguation) =

George Heron (1919–2011) was president of the Seneca Nation of Indians.

George Heron may also refer to:

- George Heron (cricketer) (born 1962), Jamaican cricketer
- George Heron (MP) (c.1515–1575), Member of Parliament for Northumberland
- George Hubert Heron (1852–1914), English footballer
- George Heron, imprisoned for the murder of Nikki Allan but later exonerated

== See also ==
- George Herron (disambiguation)
