= Roy Miller =

Roy Miller may refer to:

- Doc Miller (Roy Oscar Miller, 1883–1938), baseball player
- Roy Andrew Miller (1924–2014), American linguist
- Roy Miller (footballer) (born 1984), Costa Rican footballer
- Roy Miller (cricketer) (1924–2014), Jamaican cricketer
- Roy Miller (American football) (born 1987), American football defensive tackle
- Roy Miller (academic) (1935–2021), British academic
- Henry Pomeroy Miller (1884–1946), known as Roy, "boy mayor" of Corpus Christi, Texas (1913–1919)
- Roy Miller, a character in the 2010 action comedy film Knight and Day
- Roy Miller, a character in the 2010 action thriller film Green Zone

== See also ==
- Roy Millar, Irish FA's director of coaching
