= Laurence Cunningham =

Laurence or Laurie Cunningham may refer to:

- Laurie Cunningham (footballer, born 1921) (1921-2013), English footballer see List of AFC Bournemouth players
- Laurie Cunningham (1956-1989), English footballer

== See also ==
- Lawrence Cunningham (disambiguation)
