= Aitcheson =

Aitcheson is a surname. Notable people with the surname include:

- David Aitcheson (born 1964), Fijian lawn bowler
- Donald Aitcheson (born 1916), Jamaican cricketer
- Joe Aitcheson Jr. (1928–2014), American jockey
- Kashawn Aitcheson (born 2006), Canadian ice hockey player

== See also ==
- Aitchison
