= Morgan Lloyd =

Morgan Lloyd may refer to:

- Morgan Lloyd (politician) (1822–1893), Welsh politician
- Morgan Lloyd (gymnast) (born 1999), Cayman gymnast

== See also ==
- Lloyd Morgan
