= Joseph Holt (disambiguation) =

Joseph Holt (1807–1894) was a United States lawyer and politician.

Joseph Holt may also refer to:

- Joseph Holt (rebel) (1756–1826), United Irish General rebel transported to Australia
- Joseph Holt (cricketer) (1885–1968), Jamaica and West Indies cricketer
- Joseph F. Holt (1924–1997), U.S. Representative from California
- Joseph Holt's Brewery of Manchester, England
