= Herbert Campbell =

Herbert Campbell may refer to:

- Herbert Campbell (actor) (1844–1904), English stage actor
- Herbert Campbell (cricketer) (1899–1974), English cricketer
- Herbert Campbell (priest) (1856–1934), English Anglican priest
