= Bob Marley (disambiguation) =

Bob Marley (1945–1981) was a Jamaican musician.

Bob Marley or Robert Marley may also refer to:

== Arts and entertainment ==
- "Bob Marley" (song), a 2012 song by Dean Brody
- "Bob Marley", a 2017 song by Dadju
- Robert Marley, a character in The Muppet Christmas Carol
- Bob Marley: One Love, 2024 American film

== People ==
- Bob Marley (comedian) (born 1967), American comedian
- Robert Marley (cricketer) (1909–1995), Jamaican cricketer

== See also ==
- Bob Marley and the Wailers
- Bob Marley Museum
