= Nigel Kennedy (disambiguation) =

Nigel Kennedy (born 1956), is an English musician.

Nigel Kennedy may also refer to:

- Nigel Kennedy (cricketer) (born 1964), Jamaican cricketer
- Nigel Kennedy (politician) (1889–1964), British politician
