= Samuel Morgan (disambiguation) =

Samuel Morgan (1798–1880) was an American businessman, builder, and manufacturer.

Sam or Sammy Morgan may also refer to:

- Sam Morgan (musician) (1895–1936), New Orleans jazz band musician & bandleader
- Sam Morgan (entrepreneur) (born 1975), New Zealand businessman
- Sammy Morgan (footballer) (born 1946), Northern Irish footballer
- Samuel Morgan (cricketer) (born 1950), Jamaican cricketer
- Sammy Morgan (fighter) (born 1981), martial arts fighter
- Sam Morgan (General Hospital), a character on General Hospital
