= Geoffrey Gunter =

Geoffrey, Jeffrey or Jeff Gunter may refer to:

- Geoffrey Gunter (cricketer) (1876–1961), Jamaican cricketer
- Sir Geoffrey Campbell Gunter (1879–1961), Jamaican politician, accountant and acting governor of Jamaica
- Jeffrey Ross Gunter (born 1961), American diplomat
- Jeffrey Gunter (born 1999), American football player
