= Francis Lewis (disambiguation) =

Francis Lewis (1713–1802) was a signer of the United States Declaration of Independence as a representative of New York.

Francis Lewis may also refer to:

- Francis Lewis (botanist) (1875–1955), English botanist
- Francis Lewis High School, New York
- Francis Lewis (MP) (c. 1692–1744), English politician
- Francis Lewis (Trinidad and Tobago politician)
- Francis Draper Lewis (1849–1930), Philadelphian lawyer, co-founded the law firm Morgan, Lewis, later Morgan, Lewis & Bockius
- SS Francis Lewis on List of Liberty ships

== See also ==
- Frances Moloney née Lewis, Irish socialite and nun
- Frank Lewis (disambiguation)
