= Edward Hobson =

Edward Hobson may refer to:

- Edward H. Hobson (1825–1901), American merchant, banker, politician and brigadier general
- Edward Hobson (botanist) (1782–1830), English weaver and botanist
- Edward Hobson (cricketer) (1869–1923), English cricketer
