= Walter Farquharson =

Walter Farquharson may refer to:

- Walter Farquharson (cricketer) (1859 – 1930), Jamaican cricketer
- Walter H. Farquharson (born 1936), Canadian clergyman
