= Samuel Francis =

Samuel or Sam Francis may refer to:

- Samuel Francis (cricketer) (born 1958), Jamaican cricketer
- Samuel Francis (politician) (1830–1906), Utah politician
- Sam Francis (1923–1994), artist
- Sam Francis (American football) (1913–2002), American football player and coach, and Olympic shot putter
- Sam Francis (writer) (1947–2005), American white nationalist writer
- Sam Francis (rugby union) (born 2003), South African rugby union player
- Samuel Francis (sprinter) (born 1987), Nigerian-Qatari sprinter
- Samuel Trevor Francis (1834–1925), English hymn writer
- Samuel Ward Francis (1835–1886), American writer, inventor and physician
