= Colin Gordon (disambiguation) =

Colin Gordon was a British actor.

Colin Gordon can also refer to:

- Colin Gordon (athlete), Jamaican high jumper
- Colin Gordon (footballer), English footballer and sports agent
- Colin Gordon (cricketer), Jamaican cricketer
