= Robert Herbert (disambiguation) =

Robert Herbert (1831–1905) was the first premier of Queensland, Australia.

Robert Herbert may also refer to:

- Robert Herbert, 12th Earl of Pembroke (1791–1862), British nobleman
- Robert Herbert (cricketer) (1863-1920), Jamaican cricketer
- Bobby Herbert (1925–2006), Scottish footballer
- Bob Herbert (talent manager) (1942–1999), English artist manager
- Bob Herbert (born 1945), American journalist
- Bob Herbert (footballer) (1919–2004), Australian footballer for Melbourne
- Robert K. Herbert (died 2007), American linguist and anthropologist
- Robert Sawyer Herbert (1693–1769), British member of parliament for Wilton
- Robert Herbert (Ontario politician) (1914–1960), Canadian politician
