= Prince Francis =

Prince Francis may refer to:

- Prince Francis Joseph of Battenberg
- Prince Francis, Duke of Teck
- Prince Francis of Teck
- Prince Francesco, Count of Trapani
- Prince Francis Joseph of Braganza, Portuguese prince
- Prince Francis (cricketer) (born 1957), Jamaican cricketer
- Prince Franz of Bavaria
- Franz von Bayern
- Franz I, Prince of Liechtenstein
- Prince Franz of Liechtenstein
- Prince Franz de Paula of Liechtenstein
- Franz Joseph I, Prince of Liechtenstein
- Franz Joseph II, Prince of Liechtenstein
- Prince Franz Josef of Liechtenstein (1962–1991)
- Franz Wilhelm Prinz von Preussen
- Franz Joseph, 9th Prince of Thurn and Taxis
