= Stephen Gordon =

Stephen, Steven or Steve Gordon may refer to:

== Creative artists ==
- Steve Gordon (director) (1938–1982), American filmmaker
- Steven E. Gordon (born 1960), American director, character designer and animator
- Stephen Samuel Gordon (1970–2014), British poet and MC a/k/a The Spaceape
- Stephen J. Gordon (born 1986), English chess grandmaster

== Sportsmen ==
- Steve Gordon (rugby union) (born 1967), New Zealand lock
- Steve Gordon (Cayman Islands cricketer) (born 1967), Jamaica-born right-arm medium bowler
- Steve Gordon (Jamaican cricketer) (born 1970), left-arm fast medium bowler
- Steve Gordon (rugby league) (born 1986), Australian fullback, centre and wing

== Others ==
- Steve Gordon (activist) (born c.1948), Aboriginal Australian activist who lived in Brewarrina
- Steven Dean Gordon (born 1969), American serial killer

== Characters ==
- Stephen Gordon, protagonist of Radclyffe Hall's 1928 novel The Well of Loneliness
