= Frank Cunningham =

Frank Cunningham may refer to:

- Frank Cunningham (politician), Canadian lawyer and public servant
- Frank Cunningham (cricketer) (born 1962), Jamaican cricketer
- Frank Cunningham (rally driver), see Sno*Drift
- Frank Cunningham, actor in Jesse James' Women

== See also ==
- Francis Cunningham (disambiguation)
