= Horace Reid =

Horace Reid may refer to:

- Horace Reid (cricketer) (born 1935), Jamaican cricketer of the 1960s.
- Horace Reid (tennis) (born 1955), American tennis player of the 1970s.
