= Frances Wilson =

Frances Wilson may refer to:

- Frances C. Wilson (born 1948), United States Marine Corps general
- Frances Wilson (writer) (born 1964), British author
- Fran Wilson (born 1991), English cricketer

== See also ==
- Frances Wilson Grayson (died 1927), American aviator
- Francis Wilson (disambiguation) for men of the similar name
