= Ernest Poole (cricketer) =

Jamaican cricketer

Personal information
- Born: 8 August 1874; Manchester, Jamaica
- Source: Cricinfo, 5 November 2020

Ernest Poole (born 8 August 1874, date of death unknown) was a Jamaican cricketer. He played in three first-class matches for the Jamaican cricket team in 1896/97.

== See also ==
- List of Jamaican representative cricketers
