= Owen Allison =

Jamaican cricketer (born 1949)

Personal information
- Born: 24 August 1949 (age 77); Spanish Town, Jamaica
- Source: Cricinfo, 5 November 2020

Owen Allison (born 24 August 1949) is a Jamaican cricketer. He played in three first-class matches for the Jamaican cricket team in 1972/73.

== See also ==
- List of Jamaican representative cricketers
