= Medroy Williams =

Jamaican cricketer (born 1953)

Personal information
- Born: 17 May 1953 (age 73); Saint Mary Parish, Jamaica
- Source: Cricinfo, 5 November 2020

Medroy Williams (born 17 May 1953) is a Jamaican cricketer. He played in one first-class match for the Jamaican cricket team in 1984/85.

== See also ==
- List of Jamaican representative cricketers
