= Shimei Burton =

Jamaican cricketer (born 1975)

Personal information
- Born: 3 February 1975 (age 51); Manchester, Jamaica
- Source: Cricinfo, 5 November 2020

Shimei Burton (born 3 February 1975) is a Jamaican cricketer. He played in one List A and two first-class matches for the Jamaican cricket team from 1995 and 1997.

== See also ==
- List of Jamaican representative cricketers
