= Gerald Woollaston =

Jamaican cricketer (born 1936)

Personal information
- Born: 17 September 1936 (age 90); Kingston, Jamaica
- Source: Cricinfo, 5 November 2020

Gerald Woollaston (born 17 September 1936) is a Jamaican cricketer. He played in two first-class matches for the Jamaican cricket team in 1959/60 and 1967/68.

== See also ==
- List of Jamaican representative cricketers
