= Linval Crawford =

Jamaican cricketer

Personal information
- Born: 1 June 1959; Bounty Hill, Jamaica
- Died: 30 May 1992 (aged 32); Trelawny, Jamaica
- Source: Cricinfo, 5 November 2020

Linval Crawford (1 June 1959 – 30 May 1992) was a Jamaican cricketer. He played in one List A match for the Jamaican cricket team in 1987/88.

== See also ==
- List of Jamaican representative cricketers
