= Frederick Foster (cricketer) =

Jamaican cricketer

Personal information
- Born: 23 March 1882; Clarendon, Jamaica
- Died: 19 June 1956 (aged 74); Kingston, Jamaica
- Source: Cricinfo, 5 November 2020

Frederick Foster (23 March 1882 – 19 June 1956) was a Jamaican cricketer. He played in eight first-class matches for the Jamaican cricket team from 1901 to 1925.

== See also ==
- List of Jamaican representative cricketers
