= Dwight Mais =

Jamaican cricketer (born 1977)

Personal information
- Born: 27 October 1977 (age 49); Saint Catherine, Jamaica
- Source: Cricinfo, 5 November 2020

Dwight Mais (born 27 October 1977) is a Jamaican cricketer. He played in fourteen first-class and three List A matches for the Jamaican cricket team from 1998 to 2004.

== See also ==
- List of Jamaican representative cricketers
