= Dixeth Palmer =

Jamaican cricketer (born 1968)

Personal information
- Born: 26 January 1968 (age 58); Saint Elizabeth, Jamaica
- Source: Cricinfo, 5 November 2020

Dixeth Palmer (born 26 January 1968) is a Jamaican cricketer. He played in five first-class and three List A matches for the Jamaican cricket team from 1990 to 1995.

== See also ==
- List of Jamaican representative cricketers
