= Harold Pryce =

Jamaican cricketer

Personal information
- Born: 1931 (age 94–95); Saint Mary Parish, Jamaica
- Source: Cricinfo, 5 November 2020

Harold Pryce (born 1931) is a Jamaican cricketer. He played in one first-class match for the Jamaican cricket team in 1954/55.

== See also ==
- List of Jamaican representative cricketers
