= Alford Givance =

Jamaican cricketer (born 1974)

Personal information
- Born: 24 March 1974 (age 52); Jamaica
- Source: Cricinfo, 5 November 2020

Alford Givance (born 24 March 1974) is a Jamaican cricketer. He played in one List A and two first-class matches for the Jamaican cricket team in 1992/93.

== See also ==
- List of Jamaican representative cricketers
