= George Herron =

George Herron may refer to:

- George D. Herron (1862–1925), American clergyman, writer and Christian socialist activist
- George Richard Herron (1888–1967), New Zealand politician of the National Party

== See also ==
- George Heron (disambiguation)
