= Michael Binns (cricketer) =

Jamaican cricketer

Personal information
- Born: 24 January 1902; Kingston, Jamaica
- Died: 1 October 1987 (aged 85); Kingston, Jamaica
- Source: Cricinfo, 5 November 2020

Michael Binns (24 January 1902 – October 1987) was a Jamaican cricketer. He played in one first-class match for the Jamaican cricket team in 1926/27.

== See also ==
- List of Jamaican representative cricketers
