= Roy Paul (cricketer) =

Jamaican cricketer (born 1943)

Personal information
- Born: 11 November 1943 (age 83); Kingston, Jamaica
- Source: Cricinfo, 5 November 2020

Roy Paul (born 11 November 1943) is a Jamaican cricketer. He played in two first-class matches for the Jamaican cricket team in 1971/72.

== See also ==
- List of Jamaican representative cricketers
