= Shane Ford =

Jamaican cricketer (born 1969)

Personal information
- Born: 8 September 1969 (age 57); Kingston, Jamaica
- Source: Cricinfo, 5 November 2020

Shane Ford (born 8 September 1969) is a Jamaican cricketer. He played in 28 first-class and 19 List A matches for the Jamaican cricket team from 1993 to 1999.

== See also ==
- List of Jamaican representative cricketers
