= Laurie Fidee =

Jamaican cricketer

Personal information
- Full name: Laurie George Fidee
- Born: 7 July 1921; Kingston, Jamaica
- Died: 23 August 2011 (aged 90); Arverne, New York, United States
- Batting: Right-handed

Domestic team information
- Years: Team
- 1947-48: Jamaica
- Source: Cricinfo, 5 November 2020

Laurie Fidee (7 July 1921 – 23 August 2011) was a Jamaican cricketer who played in one first-class match for the Jamaican cricket team in 1947/48 captained by George Headley. It was the first tour to be taken by the Jamaican team since 1939.

Laurie Fidee was a right-handed batsman and all-rounder. Throughout the 1940s and early 1950s he played cricket for the Lucas Cricket Club. Fidee made the first of two first-class Senior Cup centuries in 1947 using the bat of Leslie Hylton which was promised to him by the older more experienced cricketer should he pull off the feat.

In 1951, he began a two year professional contract with Poloc Cricket Club in the Scottish Cricket League. He later spent time studying art and playing cricket in England before returning to Jamaica where he continued to play cricket into the 1960s. In 1964, he captained the Alcan Cricket Team to a Junior Cup championship.

He emigrated from Jamaica to the United States in 1968.

== See also ==
- List of Jamaican representative cricketers
