= Mario Ventura =

Jamaican cricketer (born 1974)

Personal information
- Born: 21 April 1974 (age 52); Kingston, Jamaica
- Source: Cricinfo, 5 November 2020

Mario Ventura (born 21 April 1974) is a Jamaican cricketer. He played in 39 first-class and 10 List A matches for the Jamaican cricket team from 1992 to 2004.

== See also ==
- List of Jamaican representative cricketers
