= Louis Phillips (cricketer) =

Jamaican cricketer

Personal information
- Born: 3 July 1883
- Source: Cricinfo, 5 November 2020

Louis Phillips (born 3 July 1883, date of death unknown) was a Jamaican cricketer. He played in four first-class matches for the Jamaican cricket team from 1905 to 1909.

== See also ==
- List of Jamaican representative cricketers
