= Olanza Harris =

Jamaican cricketer (born 1976)

Personal information
- Born: 25 October 1976 (age 50); Saint Ann, Jamaica
- Source: Cricinfo, 5 November 2020

Olanza Harris (born 25 October 1976) is a Jamaican cricketer. He played in one List A match for the Jamaican cricket team in 2004/05.

== See also ==
- List of Jamaican representative cricketers
