= Wayne Cuff =

Jamaican cricketer (born 1971)

Personal information
- Born: 26 December 1971 (age 54); Kingston, Jamaica
- Source: Cricinfo, 5 November 2020

Wayne Cuff (born 26 December 1971) is a Jamaican cricketer. He played in ten first-class and five List A matches for the Jamaican cricket team from 1995 to 2002.

== See also ==
- List of Jamaican representative cricketers
