= Samuel Allen (cricketer) =

Jamaican cricketer (born 1943)

Personal information
- Born: 28 May 1943 (age 83)
- Source: Cricinfo, 5 November 2020

Samuel Allen (born 28 May 1943) is a Jamaican cricketer. He played in one List A and two first-class matches for the Jamaican cricket team in 1975/76.

== See also ==
- List of Jamaican representative cricketers
