= Everett Whittingham =

Jamaican cricketer (born 1954)

Personal information
- Born: 25 February 1954 (age 72); Kingston, Jamaica
- Source: Cricinfo, 5 November 2020

Everett Whittingham (born 25 February 1954) is a Jamaican cricketer. He played in one first-class and three List A matches for the Jamaican cricket team from 1980 to 1985.

== See also ==
- List of Jamaican representative cricketers
