= Wilfred Plummer =

Jamaican cricketer (born 1957)

Personal information
- Born: 17 November 1957 (age 68); Trelawny, Jamaica
- Source: Cricinfo, 5 November 2020

Wilfred Plummer (born 17 November 1957) is a Jamaican cricketer. He played in one first-class match for the Jamaican cricket team in 1978/79. Plummer was also the coach of the Canadian team at the 2010 Under-19 Cricket World Cup.

== See also ==
- List of Jamaican representative cricketers
