= Victor Fray =

Jamaican cricketer (born 1946)

Personal information
- Born: 18 August 1946 (age 80); Kingston, Jamaica
- Source: Cricinfo, 5 November 2020

Victor Fray (born 18 August 1946) is a Jamaican cricketer. He played in eleven first-class matches for the Jamaican cricket team from 1965 to 1970.

== See also ==
- List of Jamaican representative cricketers
