= Jamie Trenchfield =

Jamaican cricketer (born 1987)

Personal information
- Born: 23 November 1987 (age 38); Jamaica
- Source: Cricinfo, 5 November 2020

Jamie Trenchfield (born 23 November 1987) is a Jamaican cricketer. He played in one first-class match for the Jamaican cricket team in 2007.

== See also ==
- List of Jamaican representative cricketers
