= Terrence Corke =

Jamaican cricketer (born 1955)

Personal information
- Born: 27 December 1955 (age 70); Kingston, Jamaica
- Source: Cricinfo, 5 November 2020

Terrence Corke (born 27 December 1955) is a Jamaican cricketer. He played in five first-class and four List A matches for the Jamaican cricket team from 1983 to 1985.

== See also ==
- List of Jamaican representative cricketers
