= Hugh Fuller =

Jamaican cricketer

Personal information
- Born: 27 April 1912; Kingston, Jamaica
- Died: March 1965; Kingston, Jamaica
- Source: Cricinfo, 5 November 2020

Hugh Fuller (27 April 1912 – March 1965) was a Jamaican cricketer. He played in one first-class match for the Jamaican cricket team in 1949/50.

== See also ==
- List of Jamaican representative cricketers
