= Irvin Iffla =

Jamaican cricketer

Personal information
- Born: 20 January 1924; Kingston, Jamaica
- Died: 16 March 2012 (aged 88); Stirling, Scotland
- Source: Cricinfo, 5 November 2020

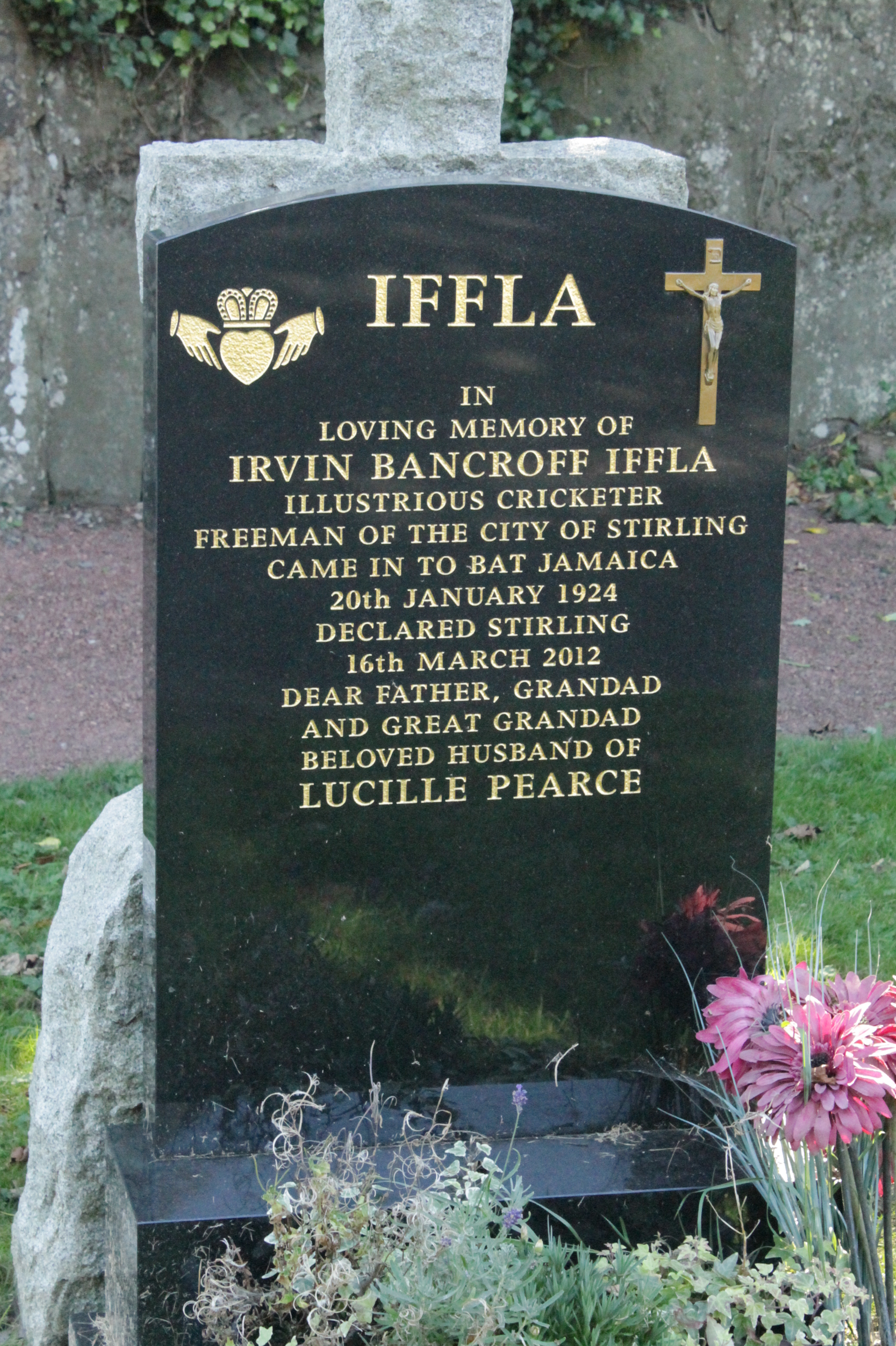
The grave of Irvin Iffla, Valleyfield Cemetery, Stirling

Irvin Bancroff Iffla (20 January 1924 – 16 March 2012) was a Jamaican-born cricketer who lived and played in Scotland.

== Life ==
He was born in Kingston, Jamaica the son of Donald Keith Iffla (1893-1926) and his wife Epoldina Maud Patterson (1896-1963).

He played in four first-class matches for the Jamaican cricket team from 1947 to 1950. In 1951, he moved to Scotland to join Stirling County Cricket Club and is credited with popularising cricket in the country.

He died at 1 Hill Street in St Ninians just south of Stirling and is buried in Valleyfield Cemetery next to Stirling Castle in central Scotland.

== Family ==
In 1945 he was married to Lucille Pearce in Jamaica. They had five children.

== See also ==
- List of Jamaican representative cricketers
