= Neville Hawkins =

Jamaican cricketer

Personal information
- Born: 5 September 1936 (age 90); Jamaica
- Source: Cricinfo, 5 November 2020

Neville Hawkins (born 5 September 1936) is a Jamaican cricketer. He played in seven first-class matches for the Jamaican cricket team from 1963 to 1967.

== See also ==
- List of Jamaican representative cricketers
