= Dwight Stewart (cricketer) =

Jamaican cricketer (born 1983)

Personal information
- Born: 28 April 1983 (age 43); Clarendon Parish, Jamaica
- Source: Cricinfo, 5 November 2020

Dwight Stewart (born 28 April 1983) is a Jamaican cricketer. He played in one first-class match for the Jamaican cricket team in 2005.

== See also ==
- List of Jamaican representative cricketers
