= Deron Dixon =

Jamaican cricketer (born 1967)

Personal information
- Born: 18 January 1967 (age 59); Kingston, Jamaica
- Source: Cricinfo, 5 November 2020

Deron Dixon (born 18 January 1967) is a Jamaican former cricketer. He played in five first-class and four List A matches for the Jamaican cricket team from 1984 to 1989. In 2008, he was appointed as the manager of the team.

== See also ==
- List of Jamaican representative cricketers
