= Donovan Malcolm =

Jamaican cricketer (born 1959)

Personal information
- Born: 12 January 1959 (age 67)
- Source: Cricinfo, 5 November 2020

Donovan Malcolm (born 12 January 1959) is a Jamaican cricketer. He played in one List A and eight first-class matches for the Jamaican cricket team from 1980 and 1982.

== See also ==
- List of Jamaican representative cricketers
