= Thomas Nicholson (cricketer) =

English cricketer

Personal information
- Born: 15 March 1876; Madras, India
- Died: 3 October 1939 (aged 63); Cambridge, England
- Source: Cricinfo, 5 November 2020

Thomas Nicholson (15 March 1876 – 3 October 1939) was an English cricketer. He played in twelve first-class matches for the Jamaican cricket team from 1904 to 1911.

== See also ==
- List of Jamaican representative cricketers
