= Hiram Meikle =

Jamaican cricketer

Personal information
- Born: 28 July 1897; Saint Mary Parish, Jamaica
- Died: 25 June 1989 (aged 91); Kingston, Jamaica
- Source: Cricinfo, 5 November 2020

Hiram Meikle (28 July 1897 – 25 June 1989) was a Jamaican cricketer. He played in one first-class match for the Jamaican cricket team in 1938/39.

== See also ==
- List of Jamaican representative cricketers
