= Robert Honiball =

Jamaican cricketer

Personal information
- Born: 28 December 1874; Saint Thomas Parish, Jamaica
- Died: 14 January 1907 (aged 32); Kingston, Jamaica
- Source: Cricinfo, 5 November 2020

Robert Honiball (28 December 1874 – 14 January 1907) was a Jamaican cricketer. He played in four first-class matches for the Jamaican cricket team from 1894 to 1897.

== See also ==
- List of Jamaican representative cricketers
