= Henry Bicknell =

Jamaican cricketer

Personal information
- Born: 4 February 1903; Kingston, Jamaica
- Died: 7 July 1978 (aged 75); Kingston, Jamaica
- Source: Cricinfo, 5 November 2020

Henry Bicknell (4 February 1903 – 7 July 1978) was a Jamaican cricketer. He played in two first-class matches for the Jamaican cricket team in 1926/27.

== See also ==
- List of Jamaican representative cricketers
