= Percival Tomlinson =

Jamaican cricketer (born 1959)

Personal information
- Born: 12 October 1959 (age 67)
- Source: Cricinfo, 5 November 2020

Percival Tomlinson (born 12 October 1959) is a Jamaican cricketer. He played in one first-class match for the Jamaican cricket team in 1980/81.

== See also ==
- List of Jamaican representative cricketers
