= Samuel Young (Jamaican cricketer) =

Jamaican cricketer

Personal information
- Born: 10 December 1902; Kingston, Jamaica
- Source: Cricinfo, 5 November 2020

Samuel Young (born 10 October 1902, date of death unknown) was a Jamaican cricketer. He played in six first-class matches for the Jamaican cricket team from 1924 to 1928.

== See also ==
- List of Jamaican representative cricketers
