= Marlon Gibbs =

Jamaican cricketer (born 1971)

Personal information
- Born: 30 March 1971 (age 55); Jamaica
- Source: Cricinfo, 5 November 2020

Marlon Gibbs (born 30 March 1971) is a Jamaican cricketer. He played in five first-class and nine List A matches for the Jamaican cricket team from 1995 to 1997.

== See also ==
- List of Jamaican representative cricketers
