= Wallwood Nelson =

Jamaican cricketer

Personal information
- Full name: Wallwood Leopold Nelson
- Born: 12 January 1884; Saint Elizabeth, Jamaica
- Source: Cricinfo, 5 November 2020

Wallwood Nelson (born 12 January 1884, date of death unknown) was a Jamaican cricketer. He played in six first-class matches for the Jamaican cricket team from 1904 to 1909.

== See also ==
- List of Jamaican representative cricketers
