= Calbert Minott =

Jamaican cricketer

Personal information
- Born: 1932 (age 93–94); Saint Thomas Parish, Jamaica
- Source: Cricinfo, 5 November 2020

Calbert Minott (born 1932) is a Jamaican cricketer. He played in one first-class match for the Jamaican cricket team in 1954/55.

== See also ==
- List of Jamaican representative cricketers
