= Cecil Lawson =

Jamaican cricketer (born 1944)

Personal information
- Born: 19 April 1944 (age 82)
- Source: Cricinfo, 5 November 2020

Cecil Lawson (born 19 April 1944) is a Jamaican cricketer. He played in seventeen first-class and three List A matches for the Jamaican cricket team from 1971 to 1978.

== See also ==
- List of Jamaican representative cricketers
