= O'Neil Cruikshank =

Jamaican cricketer (born 1968)

Personal information
- Born: 1 January 1968 (age 58); Jamaica
- Source: Cricinfo, 5 November 2020

O'Neil Cruikshank (born 1 January 1968) is a Jamaican cricketer. He played in one first-class and two List A matches for the Jamaican cricket team from 1990 and 1992.

== See also ==
- List of Jamaican representative cricketers
