= Raymond Stewart (Jamaican cricketer) =

Jamaican cricketer (born 1976)

Personal information
- Born: 9 January 1976 (age 50); Kingston, Jamaica
- Source: Cricinfo, 27 June 2023

Raymond Stewart (born 9 January 1976) is a Jamaican cricketer. He played in one List A match for the Jamaican cricket team in 1999/00.

== See also ==
- List of Jamaican representative cricketers
