= Hume Parris =

Jamaican cricketer (born 1940)

Personal information
- Born: 22 February 1940 (age 86); Saint Ann, Jamaica
- Source: Cricinfo, 5 November 2020

Hume Parris (born 22 February 1940) is a Jamaican cricketer. He played in three first-class matches for the Jamaican cricket team from 1961 to 1964.

== See also ==
- List of Jamaican representative cricketers
