= Kemar Marshall =

Jamaican cricketer (born 1991)

Personal information
- Born: 9 October 1991 (age 35); Jamaica
- Source: Cricinfo, 5 November 2020

Kemar Marshall (born 9 October 1991) is a Jamaican cricketer. He played in two List A matches for the Jamaican cricket team in 2010.

== See also ==
- List of Jamaican representative cricketers
