= Donald Miller (cricketer) =

Jamaican cricketer (born 1939)

Personal information
- Born: 23 May 1939 (age 87); Kingston, Jamaica
- Source: Cricinfo, 5 November 2020

Donald Miller (born 23 May 1939) is a Jamaican cricketer. He played in one first-class match for the Jamaican cricket team in 1961/62.

== See also ==
- List of Jamaican representative cricketers
