= Livern Wellington =

Jamaican cricketer (born 1950)

Personal information
- Born: 5 January 1950 (age 76); Kingston, Jamaica
- Source: Cricinfo, 5 November 2020

Livern Wellington (born 5 January 1950) is a Jamaican cricketer. He played in eleven first-class matches for the Jamaican cricket team in 1969/70 and 1970/71.

== See also ==
- List of Jamaican representative cricketers
