= Ralph Royes =

Jamaican cricketer

Personal information
- Born: 17 May 1908; Kingston, Jamaica
- Died: 13 December 1972 (aged 64); Kingston, Jamaica
- Source: Cricinfo, 5 November 2020

Ralph Royes (17 May 1908 – 13 December 1972) was a Jamaican cricketer. He played in one first-class match for the Jamaican cricket team in 1931/32.

== See also ==
- List of Jamaican representative cricketers
