= Walford Williams =

Jamaican cricketer (born 1952)

Personal information
- Born: 1 January 1952 (age 74); Portland, Jamaica
- Source: Cricinfo, 5 November 2020

Walford Williams (born 1 January 1952) is a Jamaican cricketer. He played in one first-class match for the Jamaican cricket team in 1979/80.

== See also ==
- List of Jamaican representative cricketers
