= Charles Morales =

Jamaican cricketer

Personal information
- Born: 4 April 1895; Hanover, Jamaica
- Died: 18 March 1987 (aged 91)
- Source: Cricinfo, 5 November 2020

Charles Morales (4 April 1895 – 18 March 1987) was a Jamaican cricketer. He played in twelve first-class matches for the Jamaican cricket team from 1924 to 1929.

== See also ==
- List of Jamaican representative cricketers
