= Winston Davis (Jamaican cricketer) =

Jamaican cricketer

Personal information
- Born: 1 July 1941; Kingston, Jamaica
- Died: 16 October 1994 (aged 53); New York, United States
- Source: Cricinfo, 5 November 2020

Winston Davis (1 July 1941 – 16 October 1994) was a Jamaican cricketer. He played in six first-class matches for the Jamaican cricket team from 1963 to 1972.

== See also ==
- List of Jamaican representative cricketers
