= Brian Murphy (Jamaican cricketer) =

Jamaican cricketer (born 1973)

Personal information
- Born: 7 April 1973 (age 53)
- Source: Cricinfo, 5 November 2020

Brian Murphy (born 7 April 1973) is a Jamaican cricketer. He played in 34 first-class and 12 List A matches for the Jamaican cricket team from 1993 to 2002.

== See also ==
- List of Jamaican representative cricketers
