= Clinton Headlam =

Jamaican cricketer (1929–1997)

Personal information
- Born: 16 November 1929; Saint Andrew Parish, Jamaica
- Died: 6 November 1997 (aged 67); Trafford, England
- Source: Cricinfo, 5 November 2020

Clinton Augustus Headlam (16 November 1929 – 6 November 1997) was a Jamaican cricketer. He played in four first-class matches for the Jamaican cricket team in 1957/58 and 1958/59. Headlam died in Trafford, England on 6 November 1997, at the age of 67.

== See also ==
- List of Jamaican representative cricketers
