= Clive Banton =

Jamaican cricketer (born 1969)

Personal information
- Born: 20 January 1969 (age 57)
- Source: Cricinfo, 5 November 2020

Clive Banton (born 20 January 1969) is a Jamaican cricketer. He played in two first-class and two List A matches for the Jamaican cricket team from 1988 to 1990.

== See also ==
- List of Jamaican representative cricketers
