= Rae Stephenson =

Jamaican cricketer

Personal information
- Born: 24 February 1955; Jamaica
- Died: 30 April 2005 (aged 50); Jamaica
- Source: Cricinfo, 5 November 2020

Rae Stephenson (24 February 1955 – 30 April 2005) was a Jamaican cricketer. He played in one List A match for the Jamaican cricket team in 1979/80.

== See also ==
- List of Jamaican representative cricketers
