= Frank Pearce (cricketer) =

Jamaican cricketer

Personal information
- Born: 31 March 1869; Kingston, Jamaica
- Died: 2 January 1933 (aged 63); Montreal, Quebec, Canada
- Source: Cricinfo, 5 November 2020

Frank Pearce (31 March 1869 – 2 January 1933) was a Jamaican cricketer. He played in twelve first-class matches for the Jamaican cricket team from 1894 to 1909.

== See also ==
- List of Jamaican representative cricketers
