= George Cox (Jamaican cricketer) =

Jamaican cricketer

Personal information
- Full name: George Sargeant Cox
- Born: 1 November 1877; British West Indies
- Died: 25 October 1945 (aged 67); Kingston, Jamaica

Domestic team information
- Years: Team
- 1905: Jamaica

Umpiring information
- FC umpired: 4 (1925–1926)

Career statistics
Competition	FC
Matches	1
Runs scored	31
Batting average	15.50
100s/50s	0/0
Top score	18
Balls bowled	102
Wickets	3
Bowling average	16.00
5 wickets in innings	0
10 wickets in match	0
Best bowling	2/24
Catches/stumpings	0/–
- Source: CricketArchive, 27 November 2014

George Sargeant Cox (1 November 1877 – 25 October 1945) was a Jamaican cricketer who captained the Jamaican national side in his only first-class appearance. He later served as an umpire in several first-class matches featuring Jamaica.

Cox had earlier appeared for Jamaican sides against two visiting English teams – one during the 1901–02 season, led by Richard Bennett, and another during the 1904–05 season, led by Viscount Brackley (later the 4th Earl of Ellesmere). He only match at first-class level came in August 1905, against Trinidad at Sabina Park, Kingston. He took the wickets of N. F. Hart and J. Wilson in Trinidad's first innings, finishing with 2/24 from six overs, and the wicket of Sydney Smith in its second, taking 1/24 from eleven overs. While batting, Cox came in sixth in Jamaica's first innings, making 18 runs before being caught by Percy Cox (unrelated) off the bowling of J. A. Romeo. In the second innings, he opened the batting with Francis Wilson, making 13 before again being dismissed by Romeo, this time caught by Trinidad's Wilson (who Cox had earlier dismissed).

Jamaica did not take part in the Inter-Colonial Tournament, owing to its distance from the other colonies in the British West Indies, and consequently played only irregularly at first-class level at that time. Cox was captain of Jamaica in the last of a series of four matches between Jamaica and Trinidad, all of which were won by Trinidad. Jamaica's captain in the three preceding matches was Charles Burton. Much later, in the 1920s, Cox umpired four first-class matches, each featuring Jamaica. The first three of these came in January 1925, in matches between Jamaica and Barbados at Kensington Oval, Bridgetown, with the last coming in March 1926, between Jamaica and a touring English team. Cox died in Kingston in October 1945, aged 67.
