= Roy McCatty =

Jamaican cricketer (born 1947)

Personal information
- Born: 18 July 1947 (age 79); Kingston, Jamaica
- Source: Cricinfo, 5 November 2020

Roy McCatty (born 18 July 1947) is a Jamaican cricketer. He played in seven first-class matches for the Jamaican cricket team in 1968/69 and 1969/70.

== See also ==
- List of Jamaican representative cricketers
