= Neil Hosang =

Jamaican cricketer (born 1946)

Personal information
- Born: 10 October 1946 (age 80); Montego Bay, Jamaica
- Source: Cricinfo, 5 November 2020

Neil Hosang (born 10 October 1946) is a Jamaican cricketer. He played in two first-class matches for the Jamaican cricket team in 1974/75.

== See also ==
- List of Jamaican representative cricketers
