= John Toone =

English cricketer

Personal information
- Born: 2 July 1872; Alfreton, England
- Died: 1 September 1927 (aged 55); New York, United States
- Source: Cricinfo, 5 November 2020

John Toone (2 July 1872 – 1 September 1927) was an English cricketer. He played in one first-class match for Jamaica in 1895.

Jamaica played their first first-class match in late March 1895 against R. S. Lucas' English team, losing by an innings. A second match, 12-a-side like the first, was played a few days later, with Toone coming into the team as an opening bowler. He took 7 for 29 and 6 for 51, bowling unchanged through each innings, and Jamaica won by eight wickets.

== See also ==
- List of Jamaican representative cricketers
