= Milton Josephs =

Jamaican cricketer

Personal information
- Born: 24 September 1931; Kingston, Jamaica
- Died: 4 June 1995 (aged 63)
- Source: Cricinfo, 5 November 2020

Milton Josephs (24 September 1931 – 4 June 1995) was a Jamaican cricketer. He played in three first-class matches for the Jamaican cricket team from 1959 to 1962.

== See also ==
- List of Jamaican representative cricketers
