= John Gordon (Jamaican cricketer) =

Jamaican cricketer (born 1956)

Personal information
- Born: 8 August 1956 (age 70); Kingston, Jamaica
- Source: Cricinfo, 5 November 2020

John Gordon (born 8 August 1956) is a Jamaican cricketer. He played in sixteen first-class matches for the Jamaican cricket team from 1976 to 1984.

== See also ==
- List of Jamaican representative cricketers
