= Vernon Sasso =

Jamaican cricketer

Personal information
- Born: 10 February 1897; Kingston, Jamaica
- Source: Cricinfo, 5 November 2020

Vernon Sasso (born 10 February 1897, date of death unknown) was a Jamaican cricketer. He played in one first-class match for the Jamaican cricket team in 1929/30.

== See also ==
- List of Jamaican representative cricketers
