= Rohan Taylor (cricketer) =

Jamaican cricketer (born 1965)

Personal information
- Born: 8 January 1965 (age 61); Clarendon Parish, Jamaica
- Source: Cricinfo, 5 November 2020

Rohan Taylor (born 8 January 1965) is a Jamaican cricketer. He played in one List A and five first-class matches for the Jamaican cricket team in 1990/91 and 1991/92.

== See also ==
- List of Jamaican representative cricketers
