= Errol Rattigan =

Jamaican cricketer (born 1956)

Personal information
- Born: 17 June 1956 (age 70)
- Source: Cricinfo, 5 November 2020

Errol Rattigan (born 17 June 1956) is a Jamaican cricketer. He played in one first-class match for the Jamaican cricket team in 1973/74.

== See also ==
- List of Jamaican representative cricketers
