= Othneil Miles =

Jamaican cricketer

Personal information
- Born: 23 September 1939; Clarendon Parish, Jamaica
- Died: 1 February 1982 (aged 42); Kingston, Jamaica
- Source: Cricinfo, 5 November 2020

Othneil Miles (23 September 1939 – February 1982) was a Jamaican cricketer. He played in twenty-one first-class matches for the Jamaican cricket team from 1967 to 1976.

== See also ==
- List of Jamaican representative cricketers
