= Osmond Stephenson =

Jamaican cricketer

Personal information
- Born: 8 January 1910; Kingston, Jamaica
- Source: Cricinfo, 5 November 2020

Osmond Stephenson (born 8 January 1910, date of death unknown) was a Jamaican cricketer. He played in ten first-class matches for the Jamaican cricket team from 1927 to 1939.

== See also ==
- List of Jamaican representative cricketers
