= Lloyd Williams (Jamaican cricketer) =

Jamaican cricketer (born 1939)

Personal information
- Born: 15 May 1939 (age 87); Westmoreland, Jamaica
- Source: Cricinfo, 5 November 2020

Lloyd Williams (born 15 May 1939) is a Jamaican cricketer. He played in one first-class match for the Jamaican cricket team in 1957/58.

== See also ==
- List of Jamaican representative cricketers
