= Thomas Mercier =

Jamaican cricketer

Personal information
- Born: 8 January 1890; Saint Mary Parish, Jamaica
- Source: Cricinfo, 5 November 2020

Thomas Mercier (born 8 January 1890, date of death unknown) was a Jamaican cricketer. He played in three first-class matches for the Jamaican cricket team in 1924/25 and 1925/26.

== See also ==
- List of Jamaican representative cricketers
