= Raymond Ferguson (cricketer) =

Jamaican cricketer (born 1969)

Personal information
- Born: 21 August 1969 (age 57); Kingston, Jamaica
- Source: Cricinfo, 5 November 2020

Raymond Ferguson (born 21 August 1969) is a Jamaican cricketer. He played in three List A matches for the Jamaican cricket team in 1998/99.

== See also ==
- List of Jamaican representative cricketers
