= John McLeod (Jamaican cricketer) =

Jamaican cricketer

Personal information
- Born: 1931 (age 94–95); Kingston, Jamaica
- Source: Cricinfo, 5 November 2020

John McLeod (born 1931) is a Jamaican cricketer. He played in three first-class matches for the Jamaican cricket team in 1951/52 and 1952/53.

== See also ==
- List of Jamaican representative cricketers
