= George Smith (Jamaican cricketer) =

Jamaican cricketer

Personal information
- Born: 8 October 1934 (age 92); Kingston, Jamaica
- Source: Cricinfo, 5 November 2020

George Smith (born 8 October 1934) is a Jamaican cricketer. He played in three first-class matches for the Jamaican cricket team in 1956/57.

== See also ==
- List of Jamaican representative cricketers
