= Samuel Uter =

Jamaican cricketer

Personal information
- Born: 1885; Portland, Jamaica
- Died: Unknown
- Source: Cricinfo, 5 November 2020

Samuel Uter (born 1885, date of death unknown) was a Jamaican cricketer. He played in three first-class matches for the Jamaican cricket team in 1910/11.

== See also ==
- List of Jamaican representative cricketers
