= Ronald Savariau =

Jamaican cricketer (born 1943)

Personal information
- Born: 7 December 1943 (age 82); Kingston, Jamaica
- Source: Cricinfo, 5 November 2020

Ronald Savariau (born 7 December 1943) is a Jamaican cricketer. He played in two first-class matches for the Jamaican cricket team in 1976/77.

== See also ==
- List of Jamaican representative cricketers
