= Carlton Carter =

Jamaican cricketer (born 1972)

Personal information
- Born: 19 November 1972 (age 53)
- Source: Cricinfo, 5 November 2020

Carlton Carter (born 19 November 1972) is a Jamaican cricketer. He played in two first-class matches for the Jamaican cricket team in 1988/89 and 1989/90.

== See also ==
- List of Jamaican representative cricketers
