= Luther Saunders =

Jamaican cricketer

Personal information
- Born: 26 August 1906; Saint Mary Parish, Jamaica
- Died: 21 February 2023; Minnesota, USA
- Source: Cricinfo, 5 November 2020

Luther "Teddy" Saunders (born 26 August 1906, died 21 February 2023) was a Jamaican cricketer. He played in two first-class matches for the Jamaican cricket team in 1950/51 and 1951/52.

== See also ==
- List of Jamaican representative cricketers
