= Sheldon Powell =

Jamaican cricketer (born 1987)

Personal information
- Born: 8 November 1987 (age 39)
- Source: Cricinfo, 5 November 2020

Sheldon Powell (born 8 November 1987) is a Jamaican cricketer. He played in one List A match for the Jamaican cricket team in 2007.

== See also ==
- List of Jamaican representative cricketers
