= Hopeton Barrett =

Jamaican cricketer (born 1963)

Personal information
- Born: 19 May 1963 (age 63); Littlefield, Jamaica
- Source: Cricinfo, 5 November 2020

Hopeton Barrett (born 19 May 1963) is a Jamaican cricketer. He played in two List A matches for the Jamaican cricket team from 1983 to 1986. He also played in five matches for the United States cricket team in the 1994 ICC Trophy.

== See also ==
- List of Jamaican representative cricketers
