= Robert Foster (cricketer) =

Jamaican cricketer

Personal information
- Born: 23 October 1880; Kingston, Jamaica
- Died: 13 May 1946 (aged 65); Kingston, Jamaica
- Source: Cricinfo, 5 November 2020

Robert Foster (23 October 1880 – 13 May 1946) was a Jamaican cricketer. He played in one first-class match for the Jamaican cricket team in 1910/11.

== See also ==
- List of Jamaican representative cricketers
