= Horace Tulloch =

Jamaican cricketer (1930–2018)

Personal information
- Born: 10 October 1930; Kingston, Jamaica
- Died: August 2018 (aged 87); Jamaica
- Source: Cricinfo, 5 November 2020

Horace Tulloch (10 October 1930 – August 2018) was a Jamaican cricketer. He played in four first-class matches for the Jamaican cricket team from 1951 to 1962. Tulloch was diagnosed with congestive heart failure in March 2018, and died in August, at the age of 87.

== See also ==
- List of Jamaican representative cricketers
