= Hubert Young (cricketer) =

Jamaican cricketer

Personal information
- Born: 28 May 1911; Kingston, Jamaica
- Source: Cricinfo, 5 November 2020

Hubert Young (born 28 May 1911, date of death unknown) was a Jamaican cricketer. He played in two first-class matches for the Jamaican cricket team in 1931/32.

== See also ==
- List of Jamaican representative cricketers
