= Zeniffe Fowler =

Jamaican cricketer (born 1987)

Personal information
- Born: 8 November 1987 (age 39); Kingston, Jamaica
- Source: Cricinfo, 5 November 2020

Zeniffe Fowler (born 8 November 1987) is a Jamaican cricketer. He played in one first-class match for the Jamaican cricket team in 2013.

== See also ==
- List of Jamaican representative cricketers
