= Edward Acton (cricketer) =

West Indian cricketer (1871–1912)

Personal information
- Born: 28 February 1871; Pershore, England
- Died: 31 October 1912 (aged 41); Trinidad
- Source: Cricinfo, 5 November 2020

Edward Acton (28 February 1871 – 31 October 1912) was a West Indian cricketer. He played in ten first-class matches for Jamaica and Trinidad from 1894/95 to 1904/05.

== See also ==
- List of Jamaican representative cricketers
