= William Farquharson (cricketer) =

Jamaican cricketer

Personal information
- Born: 9 August 1864; Saint Elizabeth, Jamaica
- Died: 3 August 1928 (aged 63); Croydon, England
- Source: Cricinfo, 5 November 2020

William Farquharson (9 August 1864 – 3 August 1928) was a Jamaican cricketer. He played in five first-class matches for the Jamaican cricket team from 1894 to 1897.

== See also ==
- List of Jamaican representative cricketers
