= Brenton McKenzie =

Jamaican cricketer (born 1955)

Personal information
- Born: 10 September 1955 (age 71); Saint Thomas Parish, Jamaica
- Source: Cricinfo, 5 November 2020

Brenton McKenzie (born 10 September 1955) is a Jamaican cricketer. He played in one first-class and one List A match for the Jamaican cricket team in 1984/85.

== See also ==
- List of Jamaican representative cricketers
