= Orville Pennant =

Jamaican cricketer (born 1971)

Personal information
- Born: 16 March 1971 (age 55); Manchester, Jamaica
- Source: Cricinfo, 5 November 2020

Orville Pennant (born 16 March 1971) is a Jamaican cricketer. He played in three first-class matches for the Jamaican cricket team in 1993/94 and 1994/95.

== See also ==
- List of Jamaican representative cricketers
