= Howard Harris (cricketer) =

Jamaican cricketer (born 1970)

Personal information
- Born: 13 November 1970 (age 55); Saint Ann, Jamaica
- Source: Cricinfo, 5 November 2020

Howard Harris (born 13 November 1970) is a Jamaican cricketer. He played in one List A match for the Jamaican cricket team in 1998/99.

== See also ==
- List of Jamaican representative cricketers
