= Maurice Kepple =

Jamaican cricketer (born 1981)

Personal information
- Born: 7 July 1981 (age 45); Westmoreland, Jamaica
- Source: Cricinfo, 5 November 2020

Maurice Kepple (born 7 July 1981) is a Jamaican cricketer. He played in eleven first-class matches for the Jamaican cricket team from 2002 to 2005.

== See also ==
- List of Jamaican representative cricketers
