= Ordelmo Peters =

Jamaican cricketer (born 1958)

Personal information
- Born: 20 December 1958 (age 67); Saint Catherine, Jamaica
- Source: Cricinfo, 5 November 2020

Ordelmo Peters (born 20 December 1958) is a Jamaican cricketer. He played in twenty-one first-class and sixteen List A matches for the Jamaican cricket team from 1982 to 1990.

== See also ==
- List of Jamaican representative cricketers
