= Henry Kerr (cricketer) =

Jamaican cricketer

Personal information
- Born: 18 July 1874; Manchester, Jamaica
- Died: 19 August 1933 (aged 59); Mundesley, England
- Source: Cricinfo, 5 November 2020

Henry Kerr (18 July 1874 – 19 August 1933) was a Jamaican cricketer. He played in two first-class matches for the Jamaican cricket team in 1905/06.

== See also ==
- List of Jamaican representative cricketers
