= Colin Bonitto =

Jamaican cricketer

Personal information
- Born: 1918
- Died: July 1974 (aged 55–56); Kingston, Jamaica
- Source: Cricinfo, 5 November 2020

Colin Bonitto (1918 – July 1974) was a Jamaican cricketer. He played in seven first-class matches for the Jamaican cricket team from 1946 and 1953.

== See also ==
- List of Jamaican representative cricketers
