= Wilfred Beckford =

Jamaican cricketer

Personal information
- Born: 1909
- Died: July 1959 (aged 49–50); Kingston, Jamaica
- Source: Cricinfo, 5 November 2020

Wilfred Beckford (1909 – July 1959) was a Jamaican cricketer. He played in nine first-class matches for the Jamaican cricket team from 1926 and 1936.

== See also ==
- List of Jamaican representative cricketers
