= Lyndel Wright =

Jamaican cricketer (born 1950)

Personal information
- Born: 18 April 1950 (age 76); Kingston, Jamaica
- Source: Cricinfo, 5 November 2020

Lyndel Wright (born 18 April 1950) is a Jamaican cricketer. He played in 24 first-class and 8 List A matches for the Jamaican cricket team from 1968 to 1979.

Wright served as president of the Jamaica Cricket Association from 2011 to 2013.

== See also ==
- List of Jamaican representative cricketers
