= Wayne Lewis (cricketer) =

Jamaican cricketer (born 1962)

Personal information
- Born: 17 August 1962 (age 64); Kingston, Jamaica
- Source: Cricinfo, 5 November 2020

Wayne Lewis (born 17 August 1962) is a Jamaican cricketer. He played in 32 first-class and 14 List A matches for the Jamaican cricket team from 1984 to 1995.

== See also ==
- List of Jamaican representative cricketers
