= Patrick Gayle =

Jamaican cricketer (born 1965)

Personal information
- Born: 26 October 1965 (age 61); Jamaica
- Source: Cricinfo, 5 November 2020

Patrick Gayle (born 26 October 1965) is a Jamaican cricketer. He played in ten first-class and four List A matches for the Jamaican cricket team from 1988 to 1994.

== See also ==
- List of Jamaican representative cricketers
