= Robert Maragh =

Jamaican cricketer

Personal information
- Born: 25 December 1954; Kingston, Jamaica
- Died: 10 April 1985 (aged 30); St Catherine, Jamaica
- Source: Cricinfo, 5 November 2020

Robert Maragh (25 December 1954 – 10 April 1985) was a Jamaican cricketer. He played in four first-class matches for the Jamaican cricket team from 1956 to 1959.

== See also ==
- List of Jamaican representative cricketers
