= Clement Thompson =

Jamaican cricketer (born 1956)

Personal information
- Born: 6 April 1956 (age 70); Saint Thomas Parish, Jamaica
- Source: Cricinfo, 5 November 2020

Clement Thompson (born 6 April 1956) is a Jamaican cricketer. He played in twenty first-class and fourteen List A matches for the Jamaican cricket team from 1976 to 1985.

== See also ==
- List of Jamaican representative cricketers
