= Oswald Cunningham =

Jamaican cricketer

Personal information
- Born: 1920; Kingston, Jamaica
- Source: Cricinfo, 5 November 2020

Oswald Cunningham (born 1920, died before August 2011) was a Jamaican cricketer. He played in nine first-class matches for the Jamaican cricket team from 1938 to 1951.

== See also ==
- List of Jamaican representative cricketers
