= Francis Cunningham =

Francis Cunningham may refer to:

- Francis Cunningham (Indian Army officer) (1820–1875), British Indian Army officer
- Francis Cunningham (painter) (born 1931), American artist
- Francis A. Cunningham (1804–1864), U.S. Representative from Ohio
- Francis M. Cunningham (1837–1919), American Civil War soldier

== See also ==
- Frank Cunningham (disambiguation)
