= Neville Mckoy =

Jamaican cricketer

Personal information
- Born: 4 August 1946
- Died: 11 February 1988 (aged 41); Spanish Town, Jamaica
- Source: Cricinfo, 5 November 2020

Neville Mckoy (4 August 1946 – 11 February 1988) was a Jamaican cricketer. He played in five first-class matches for the Jamaican cricket team from 1970 to 1973.

== See also ==
- List of Jamaican representative cricketers
