= Kirk Ebanks =

Jamaican cricketer (born 1968)

Personal information
- Born: 23 July 1968 (age 58); Jamaica
- Source: Cricinfo, 5 November 2020

Kirk Ebanks (born 23 July 1968) is a Jamaican cricketer. He played in four first-class matches for the Jamaican cricket team in 1991/92 and 1992/93.

== See also ==
- List of Jamaican representative cricketers
