= Edmund Burke (disambiguation) =

Edmund Burke (1729–1797) was an Irish statesman, political theorist, and philosopher.

Edmund Burke may also refer to:

== People ==
- Edmond de Burgh (or de Burke) (1298–1338), Irish knight
- Sir Edmund Burke, 2nd Baronet (died c. 1686) of the Burke baronets
- Edmund Bourke (1761–1821), Danish statesman
- Edmund Burke (New Hampshire politician) (1809–1882), U.S. Representative for New Hampshire
- Edmund Burke Fairfield (1821–1904), American minister, educator and politician
- Edmund Burke (architect) (1850–1919), Canadian architect
- Eddie Burke (1905–1993), Canadian ice hockey player
- E. Michael Burke (1916–1987), U.S. intelligence officer and business executive
- Edmund Burke III (born 1940), U.S. historian

== Other ==
- Edmund Burke Foundation, Dutch think tank named for Edmund Burke (1729–1797)
- Statue of Edmund Burke (Washington, D.C.), a 1922 public artwork by British artist James Havard Thomas
- Edmund Burke School, named for Edmund Burke (1729–1797)

== See also ==
- Clan Burke
- Edward Burke (disambiguation)
- Edmund (disambiguation)
- Burke (disambiguation)
