= Frederick Redwood =

Jamaican cricketer (born 1964)

Personal information
- Born: 6 October 1964 (age 62); Clarendon Parish, Jamaica
- Source: Cricinfo, 5 November 2020

Frederick Redwood (born 6 October 1964) is a Jamaican cricketer. He played in twelve first-class and thirteen matches for the Jamaican cricket team from 1991 to 1996.

== See also ==
- List of Jamaican representative cricketers
