= Vincent McCormack =

Jamaican cricketer

Personal information
- Born: 4 July 1892; Kingston, Jamaica
- Died: 2 April 1966 (aged 73); Kingston, Jamaica
- Source: Cricinfo, 5 November 2020

Vincent McCormack (4 July 1892 – 2 April 1966) was a Jamaican cricketer. He played in one first-class match for the Jamaican cricket team in 1925/26.

== See also ==
- List of Jamaican representative cricketers
