= Matthew Sinclair (Jamaican cricketer) =

Jamaican cricketer (born 1980)

Personal information
- Born: 26 January 1980 (age 46); Saint Elizabeth, Jamaica
- Source: Cricinfo, 5 November 2020

Matthew Sinclair (born 26 January 1980) is a Jamaican cricketer. He played in thirteen first-class and six matches for the Jamaican cricket team from 1998 to 2003.

== See also ==
- List of Jamaican representative cricketers
