= Frank Wilson =

Frank Wilson may refer to:

== Entertainment ==
- Frank Wilson (director) (born 1873), British actor, writer and film director
- Frank Wilson (American actor) (1886–1956)
- Frank Wilson (Australian actor) (1924–2005)
- Frank Avray Wilson (1914–2009), British artist
- Frank Wilson (musician) (1940–2012), songwriter and record producer for Motown Records
- Frank Wilson (journalist) (born 1941), retired book editor of the Philadelphia Inquirer
- J. Frank Wilson (1941–1991), American singer

== Politics and law ==
- Frank Wilson (politician) (1859–1918), Premier of Western Australia
- Frank O'Brien Wilson (1883–1962), Royal Navy officer, later settled in Kenya
- Frank Wiley Wilson (1917–1982), United States federal judge
- Frank J. Wilson (judge) (died 1990), American judge in Illinois
- Frank E. Wilson (politician) (1857–1935), U.S. Representative from New York
- Frank J. Wilson (1887–1970), IRS agent who helped convict Al Capone
- Frank Woodrow Wilson (1923–2013), American businessman, lawyer, and politician
- Frank Wilson (diplomat) (born 1946), New Zealand diplomat
- Frank Worthington Wilson, Canadian politician

== Sports ==
- Frank Wilson (rugby union, born 1885) (1885–1916), New Zealand rugby union player killed in WWI
- Frank Wilson (umpire) (1890–1928), American baseball umpire
- Frank Wilson (footballer, born 1891) (1891-1972), English footballer, see List of Bury F.C. players (1–24 appearances)
- Frank Wilson (baseball) (1901–1974), Major League Baseball outfielder
- Frank Wilson (footballer) (1904–?), Scottish footballer with Hamilton Academical
- Frank Wilson (rugby, born 1944) (1944–2024), rugby union and rugby league footballer of the 1960s and 1970s
- Frank Wilson (rugby union, born 1952), Irish rugby union player
- Frank Wilson Jr. (born 1966), American stock car racing driver
- Frank Wilson (American football, born 1958), American football player
- Frank Wilson (American football, born 1973), American college football coach

== Other ==
- Frank E. Wilson (bishop) (1885–1944), first Bishop of the Episcopal Diocese of Eau Claire
- F. P. Wilson (1889–1963), professor of English literature
- Frank Norman Wilson (1890–1952), American cardiologist

== See also ==
- Francis Wilson (disambiguation)
