= Harold Castle =

Jamaican cricketer (1861–1934)

Personal information
- Full name: Harold Duncan Boycott Castle
- Born: 11 December 1861; Futtehpoore, India
- Died: 4 February 1934 (aged 72); St Elizabeth, Jamaica
- Source: Cricinfo, 5 November 2020

Harold Duncan Boycott Castle (11 December 1861 – 4 February 1934) was a Jamaican cricketer. He played in five first-class matches for the Jamaican cricket team from 1894 to 1897.

== See also ==
- List of Jamaican representative cricketers
