= Marlon Tucker =

Jamaican cricketer (born 1960)

Personal information
- Born: 29 November 1960 (age 65); Kingston, Jamaica
- Source: Cricinfo, 5 November 2020

Marlon Tucker (born 29 November 1960) is a Jamaican cricketer. He played in 29 first-class and 17 List A matches for the Jamaican cricket team from 1979 to 1990.

== See also ==
- List of Jamaican representative cricketers
