= Locksley Gooden =

Jamaican cricketer

Personal information
- Born: 1920; Montego Bay, Jamaica
- Source: Cricinfo, 5 November 2020

Locksley Gooden (born 1920, date of death unknown) was a Jamaican cricketer. He played in three first-class matches for the Jamaican cricket team in 1946/47 and 1947/48.

== See also ==
- List of Jamaican representative cricketers
