= Sydney Owen =

English cricketer

Personal information
- Born: 27 February 1872; Southsea, England
- Died: 24 February 1925 (aged 52); Newport, England
- Source: Cricinfo, 5 November 2020

Sydney Owen (27 February 1872 – 24 February 1925) was an English cricketer. He played in three first-class matches for the Jamaican cricket team in 1896/97.

== See also ==
- List of Jamaican representative cricketers
