= Henry Sewell (cricketer) =

Jamaican cricketer

Personal information
- Born: 21 August 1935 (age 91); Saint Ann, Jamaica
- Source: Cricinfo, 5 November 2020

Henry Sewell (born 21 August 1935) is a Jamaican cricketer. He played in three first-class matches for the Jamaican cricket team from 1957 to 1960.

== See also ==
- List of Jamaican representative cricketers
