= Owen Mitchell =

Jamaican cricketer (born 1940)

Personal information
- Born: 24 October 1940 (age 86)
- Source: Cricinfo, 5 November 2020

Owen Mitchell (born 24 October 1940) is a Jamaican cricketer. He played in five first-class matches for the Jamaican cricket team from 1961 to 1965.

== See also ==
- List of Jamaican representative cricketers
