= Kamal Dennis =

Jamaican cricketer (born 1981)

Personal information
- Born: 19 March 1981 (age 45); Jamaica
- Source: Cricinfo, 5 November 2020

Kamal Dennis (born 19 March 1981) is a Jamaican cricketer. He played in one List A match for the Jamaican cricket team in 1999/00.

== See also ==
- List of Jamaican representative cricketers
