= Leonard Messado =

Jamaican cricketer

Personal information
- Born: 1915
- Died: 1980 (aged 64–65)
- Source: Cricinfo, 5 November 2020

Leonard Messado (1915–1980) was a Jamaican cricketer. He played in two first-class matches for the Jamaican cricket team in 1938/39.

== See also ==
- List of Jamaican representative cricketers
