= Lawrence Cunningham =

Lawrence Cunningham may refer to:

== People ==
- Lawrence Cunningham (cricketer) (born 1965), Jamaican cricketer
- Lawrence A. Cunningham (born 1962), American scholar
- Lawrence E. Cunningham (1852–1924), American politician
- Lawrence S. Cunningham (1935–2025), American theologian

== Fictional characters ==
- Lawrence Cunningham (Coronation Street)

== See also ==
- Laurence Cunningham
