= Rohan Belight =

Jamaican cricketer (born 1973)

Personal information
- Born: 26 January 1973 (age 53)
- Source: Cricinfo, 5 November 2020

Rohan Belight (born 26 January 1973) is a Jamaican cricketer. He played in one List A match for the Jamaican cricket team in 1994/95.

== See also ==
- List of Jamaican representative cricketers
