= Edward Hull (cricketer) =

Jamaican cricketer

Personal information
- Born: 27 November 1879; Kingston, Jamaica
- Died: 3 April 1947 (aged 67); Staten Island, New York, United States
- Source: Cricinfo, 5 November 2020

Edward Hull (27 November 1879 – 3 April 1947) was a Jamaican cricketer. He played in nine first-class matches for the Jamaican cricket team from 1901 to 1911.

== See also ==
- List of Jamaican representative cricketers
