= John Prescod =

Jamaican cricketer (born 1923)

Personal information
- Full name: John Enos Prescod
- Born: 12 December 1923; Manchester, Jamaica
- Source: Cricinfo, 5 November 2020

John Enos Prescod (born 12 December 1923) was a Jamaican cricketer. He played in seven first-class matches for the Jamaican cricket team from 1947 to 1953.

== See also ==
- List of Jamaican representative cricketers
