= Edwin Calnick =

Jamaican cricketer

Personal information
- Born: 22 November 1937 (age 88); Kingston, Jamaica
- Source: Cricinfo, 5 November 2020

Edwin Calnick (born 22 November 1937) is a Jamaican cricketer. He played in two first-class matches for the Jamaican cricket team in 1958/59.

== See also ==
- List of Jamaican representative cricketers
