= William Tarver =

English cricketer

Personal information
- Born: 2 November 1872; Newport Pagnell, England
- Died: 8 April 1952 (aged 79); Folkestone, England
- Source: Cricinfo, 5 November 2020

William Tarver (2 November 1872 – 8 April 1952) was an English cricketer. He played in three first-class matches for the Jamaican cricket team in 1901/02.

== See also ==
- List of Jamaican representative cricketers
