= Donald Beckford =

Jamaican cricketer (1907–1995)

Personal information
- Born: 7 June 1907; Port Maria, Jamaica
- Died: 11 October 1995 (aged 88); California, United States
- Source: Cricinfo, 5 November 2020

Donald Beckford (7 June 1907 – 11 October 1995) was a Jamaican cricketer. He played in twelve first-class matches for the Jamaican cricket team from 1931 and 1947.

== See also ==
- List of Jamaican representative cricketers
