= Henry Duncker =

Jamaican cricketer

Personal information
- Born: 4 March 1885; Kingston, Jamaica
- Source: Cricinfo, 5 November 2020

Henry Duncker (born 4 March 1885, date of death unknown) was a Jamaican cricketer. He played in four first-class matches for the Jamaican cricket team from 1905 to 1911.

== See also ==
- List of Jamaican representative cricketers
