= Kanute Barclay =

Jamaican cricketer

Personal information
- Born: 1936
- Died: June 1994 (aged 57–58); Kingston, Jamaica
- Source: Cricinfo, 5 November 2020

Kanute Barclay (1936 – June 1994) was a Jamaican cricketer. He played in three first-class matches for the Jamaican cricket team from 1954 to 1962.

== See also ==
- List of Jamaican representative cricketers
