= Hylton Gordon =

Jamaican cricketer (born 1954)

Personal information
- Born: 5 October 1954 (age 72); Kingston, Jamaica
- Source: Cricinfo, 5 November 2020

Hylton Gordon (born 5 October 1954) is a Jamaican cricketer. He played in twenty first-class and seven List A matches for the Jamaican cricket team from 1973 to 1980.

== See also ==
- List of Jamaican representative cricketers
