= Sidney McCutchin =

Jamaican cricketer (1870–1946)

Personal information
- Born: 1870
- Died: 1946 (aged 75–76); Kingston, Jamaica
- Source: Cricinfo, 5 November 2020

Sidney McCutchin (1870–1946) was a Jamaican cricketer. He played in one first-class match for the Jamaican cricket team in 1894/95.

== See also ==
- List of Jamaican representative cricketers
