= Samuel Wright (Jamaican cricketer) =

Jamaican cricketer

Personal information
- Born: 6 December 1933 (age 92); Saint Elizabeth, Jamaica
- Source: Cricinfo, 5 November 2020

Samuel Wright (born 6 December 1933) is a Jamaican cricketer. He played in one first-class match for the Jamaican cricket team in 1958/59.

== See also ==
- List of Jamaican representative cricketers
