= Robert Healing =

Jamaican cricketer

Personal information
- Born: 31 October 1873; Tewkesbury, England
- Died: 23 May 1950 (aged 76); Camberley, England
- Source: Cricinfo, 5 November 2020

Robert Healing (31 October 1873 – 23 May 1950) was a Jamaican cricketer. He played in six first-class matches for the Jamaican cricket team in 1896/97.

== See also ==
- List of Jamaican representative cricketers
