= Walter Farquharson (cricketer) =

Jamaican cricketer

Personal information
- Born: 26 June 1859; Saint Elizabeth, Jamaica
- Died: 21 January 1930 (aged 70); Westmoreland, Jamaica
- Source: Cricinfo, 5 November 2020

Walter Farquharson (26 June 1859 – 21 January 1930) was a Jamaican cricketer. He played in two first-class matches for the Jamaican cricket team in 1894/95.

== See also ==
- List of Jamaican representative cricketers
