= Herbert Campbell (cricketer) =

Jamaican cricketer

Personal information
- Born: 15 March 1889; Kingston, Jamaica
- Died: 11 March 1974 (aged 84); Kingston, Jamaica
- Source: Cricinfo, 5 November 2020

Herbert Campbell (15 March 1889 – 11 March 1974) was a Jamaican cricketer. He played in three first-class matches for the Jamaican cricket team from 1925 to 1927.

== See also ==
- List of Jamaican representative cricketers
