= John Holt (cricketer) =

West Indian cricketer

Personal information
- Batting: Right-handed
- Bowling: Right-arm offbreak
- Relatives: Joseph Holt (father)

International information
- National side: West Indies
- Test debut: 15 January 1954 v England
- Last Test: 6 March 1959 v Pakistan

Career statistics
Competition	Test	First-class
Matches	17	71
Runs scored	1,066	4,258
Batting average	36.75	41.33
100s/50s	2/5	9/22
Top score	166	172
Balls bowled	30	366
Wickets	1	5
Bowling average	20.00	35.39
5 wickets in innings	0	0
10 wickets in match	0	0
Best bowling	1/20	1/2
Catches/stumpings	8/–	30/1
- Source: CricInfo, 30 October 2022

John Kenneth Constantine Holt, known as J. K. Holt junior, OD (12 August 1923 – 3 June 1997) was a West Indian international cricketer who played in 17 Test matches between 1954 and 1959.

Holt played for Jamaica from 1946 to 1961–62. He toured India, Pakistan and Ceylon with the Commonwealth XI in 1949–50, making 838 runs at 39.90, and scoring 162 in the match against Pakistan. He spent the English summers of 1950 and 1951 playing for Haslingden in the Lancashire League.

He scored 152 for Jamaica against the MCC in 1953–54, and made his Test debut against England a few days later. He scored 94 batting at number three in his first innings, and 432 runs at 54.00 in the five-Test series, with a top score of 166 in the Second Test, when he opened the batting for the first time.

He opened throughout the series against Australia in 1954–55 but was less successful, scoring 251 runs at 25.10. He was not selected again until the tour to India and Pakistan in 1958–59, when he was vice-captain to Gerry Alexander. In all matches on the tour he scored 1001 runs at 43.52 with three centuries. He played in all five Tests in India, scoring 343 runs at 49.00 with a top score of 123 in the Fifth Test. He lost form in Pakistan, making only 40 runs in the first two Tests, which Pakistan won, and was replaced by Robin Bynoe.

His highest first-class score was 172 for Jamaica against British Guiana in 1947–48.

He was awarded the Jamaican Order of Distinction in 1976.

His father, Joseph, toured England with the West Indies team in 1923.
