= Horace Reid (cricketer) =

Jamaican cricketer

Personal information
- Born: 8 May 1935 (age 91); Kingston, Jamaica
- Source: Cricinfo, 5 November 2020

Horace Reid (born 8 May 1935) is a Jamaican cricketer. He played in four first-class matches for the Jamaican cricket team from 1961 to 1964.

== See also ==
- List of Jamaican representative cricketers
