= Lawrence Cunningham (cricketer) =

Jamaican cricketer (born 1965)

Personal information
- Born: 23 October 1965 (age 61); Montego Bay, Jamaica
- Source: Cricinfo, 5 November 2020

Lawrence Cunningham (born 23 October 1965) is a Jamaican cricketer. He played in two first-class and four List A matches for the Jamaican cricket team from 1985 to 2001.

== See also ==
- List of Jamaican representative cricketers
