= Edward Hobson (cricketer) =

English cricketer

Personal information
- Born: 14 July 1869; New York, United States
- Died: 22 August 1923 (aged 54); Bridge End, England
- Source: Cricinfo, 5 November 2020

Edward Hobson (14 July 1869 – 22 August 1923) was an English cricketer. He played in two first-class matches for the Jamaican cricket team in 1905/06.

== See also ==
- List of Jamaican representative cricketers
