= Mohamed Baksh =

West Indian cricket umpire (born 1945)

Personal information
- Full name: Mohamed Nabbi Baksh
- Born: 5 February 1945 (age 81); Guyana

Umpiring information
- ODIs umpired: 1 (1983)
- Source: Cricinfo, 16 May 2014

Mohamed Baksh (born 5 February 1945) is a former West Indian cricket umpire. He only stood in one international game as an umpire, a One Day International in 1983.

== See also ==
- List of One Day International cricket umpires
