= Trevor Henry (cricketer) =

Jamaican cricketer (born 1947)

Personal information
- Born: 7 May 1947 (age 79)
- Source: Cricinfo, 5 November 2020

Trevor Henry (born 7 May 1947) is a Jamaican cricketer. He played in one first-class and two List A matches for the Jamaican cricket team in 1976/77.

== See also ==
- List of Jamaican representative cricketers
