= Robert Herbert (cricketer) =

Jamaican cricketer (1863–1920)

Personal information
- Born: 9 March 1863; Clerkenwell, England
- Died: 23 October 1920 (aged 57); Canterbury, England
- Source: Cricinfo, 5 November 2020

Robert Herbert (9 March 1863 – 23 October 1920) was a Jamaican cricketer. He played in three first-class matches for the Jamaican cricket team in 1896/97.

== See also ==
- List of Jamaican representative cricketers
