= Samuel Francis (cricketer) =

Jamaican cricketer (born 1958)

Personal information
- Born: 8 February 1958 (age 68); St Vincent
- Source: Cricinfo, 5 November 2020

Samuel Francis (born 8 February 1958) is a Jamaican cricketer. He played in five first-class matches for the Jamaican cricket team in 1977/78.

== See also ==
- List of Jamaican representative cricketers
