= Errol Wilson =

Jamaican cricketer (born 1959)

Personal information
- Born: 18 November 1959 (age 66); Saint Elizabeth, Jamaica
- Source: Cricinfo, 5 November 2020

Errol Wilson (born 18 November 1959) is a Jamaican cricketer. He played in eleven first-class and five List A matches for the Jamaican cricket team from 1982 to 1991.

== See also ==
- List of Jamaican representative cricketers
