= Leonard Mullings =

Jamaican cricketer (1929–2023)

Personal information
- Full name: Leonard Charles Mullings
- Born: 23 March 1929; Spanish Town, Jamaica
- Died: 18 May 2023 (aged 94); Florida, U.S.
- Source: Cricinfo, 5 November 2020

Leonard Charles Mullings (23 March 1929 – 18 May 2023) was a Jamaican cricketer. He played in five first-class matches for the Jamaican cricket team from 1954 to 1960. Mullings died in Florida on 18 May 2023, at the age of 94.

== See also ==
- List of Jamaican representative cricketers
