= Sidney Abrahams (cricketer) =

West Indian cricketer (1915–1983)

Personal information
- Full name: Sidney Abrahams
- Born: August 3, 1915; Chapelton
- Died: July 27, 1983 (aged 67); Kingston, Jamaica

Career statistics
Competition	First class
Matches	5
Runs scored	229
Batting average	28.62
100s/50s	1/0
Top score	110
Balls bowled	64
Wickets	0
Bowling average	-
5 wickets in innings	0
10 wickets in match	0
Best bowling	0/8
Catches/stumpings	1/0
- Source: , 26 June 2016

Sidney Abrahams (August 3, 1915 – July 27, 1983) was a West Indian cricketer, who played for Jamaica in first-class cricket.
