= Carlton Baugh =

Jamaican cricketer

Personal information
- Full name: Carlton Seymour Baugh Jr.
- Born: 23 June 1982 (age 44); Kingston, Jamaica
- Batting: Right-handed
- Bowling: Right arm leg break
- Role: Wicket-keeper
- Relatives: Carlton Baugh (father)

International information
- National side: West Indies
- Test debut: 19 April 2003 v Australia
- Last Test: 27 April 2012 v Australia
- ODI debut: 17 May 2003 v Australia
- Last ODI: 25 March 2012 v Australia
- ODI shirt no.: 35

Career statistics
Competition	Tests	ODIs	FC	LA
Matches	21	47	96	93
Runs scored	610	482	4,601	1,083
Batting average	17.94	20.08	35.40	21.23
100s/50s	0/3	0/0	12/19	0/2
Top score	68	49	158*	71
Catches/stumpings	43/5	39/12	191/23	92/25
Medal record
Men's Cricket
Representing West Indies
ICC Champions Trophy
Runner-up	2006 India
- Source: ESPNcricinfo, 7 February 2013

Carlton Seymour Baugh (born 23 June 1982) is a Jamaican cricketer. He attended Wolmer's Schools

He is an aggressive right-hand batsman, wicketkeeper and occasional bowler of leg breaks and googlies. His Test debut came during a five-day match against Australia between 19 and 23 April 2003. His father, Carlton Baugh Snr., also played cricket between 1980 and 1983. Having scored a century against Barbados, he attracted the attention of the selectors and has been chosen to represent the West Indies in five matches thus far.

He was recalled for the West Indies tour of Canada and Abu Dhabi, but was poor both behind and in front of the stumps. He was retained for the West Indies tour of New Zealand in 2008/09, but only appeared in one Twenty20 match, where he scored 2 runs from 2 balls .

Things turned around for him when he was offered a retainer contract by the West Indies Cricket Board for the 2010/11 season.

He was forced to fly home due to a Hamstring injury, and was not available for 2011 Cricket World Cup. He lost his place in the Test side when West Indies toured England in 2012.
