= Frank Lewis (baseball) =

American baseball player

- Outfielder

Negro league baseball debut
- 1932, for the Montgomery Grey Sox

Last appearance
- 1932, for the Montgomery Grey Sox
- Stats at Baseball Reference

Teams
- Montgomery Grey Sox (1932)

Frank Lewis is an American former Negro league outfielder who played in the 1930s.

Lewis played for the Montgomery Grey Sox in 1932. In 22 recorded games, he posted 23 hits in 87 plate appearances.
