= Steve Gordon (Jamaican cricketer) =

Jamaican cricketer (born 1970)

Personal information
- Born: 18 January 1970 (age 56)
- Source: Cricinfo, 5 November 2020

Steve Gordon (born 18 January 1970) is a Jamaican cricketer. He played in one first-class match for the Jamaican cricket team in 1988/89.

== See also ==
- List of Jamaican representative cricketers
