= George Heron (cricketer) =

Jamaican cricketer (born 1962)

Personal information
- Born: 28 April 1962 (age 64); Clarendon, Jamaica
- Source: Cricinfo, 5 November 2020

George Heron (born 28 April 1962) is a Jamaican cricketer. He played in four first-class matches for the Jamaican cricket team from 1985 to 1988.

== See also ==
- List of Jamaican representative cricketers
