= Geoffrey Gunter (cricketer) =

Jamaican cricketer

Personal information
- Born: 30 April 1876; Kingston, Jamaica
- Died: 17 September 1961 (aged 85); Kingston, Jamaica
- Source: Cricinfo, 5 November 2020

Geoffrey Gunter (30 April 1876 – 17 September 1961) was a Jamaican cricketer. He played in two first-class matches for the Jamaican cricket team in 1905/06.

== See also ==
- List of Jamaican representative cricketers
