= Francis A. Wilson =

American Civil War participant

Francis Wilson (1840 - July 11, 1888) was an American soldier awarded the Medal of Honor for his actions in the American Civil War. He was awarded the Medal of Honor on June 25, 1880 for actions as a corporal with the 95th Pennsylvania Infantry at the Third Battle of Petersburg, Virginia on 2, April, 1865. He was born in Philadelphia, Pennsylvania and following his death on July 11, 1888 was buried in Mount Moriah Cemetery.

== Medal of Honor Citation ==
For extraordinary heroism on 2 April 1865, in action at Petersburg, Virginia. Corporal Wilson was among the first to penetrate the enemy's lines and himself captured a gun of the two batteries captured.
