= Lloyd Morgan =

Jamaican cricketer (born 1945)

Personal information
- Born: 15 April 1945 (age 81); Kingston, Jamaica
- Source: Cricinfo, 5 November 2020

Lloyd Morgan (born 15 April 1945) is a Jamaican cricketer. He played in four first-class matches for the Jamaican cricket team from 1968 to 1973.

== See also ==
- List of Jamaican representative cricketers
