= Frank Lewis (cricketer) =

Jamaican cricketer (born 1933)

Personal information
- Born: 19 January 1933 (age 93); Kingston, Jamaica
- Source: Cricinfo, 5 November 2020

Frank Richard Lewis (born 19 January 1933) is a Jamaican former cricketer. He played in four first-class matches for the Jamaican cricket team 1956 to 1959. Lewis was born in the Rollington Town neighbourhood of Kingston on 19 January 1933.

== See also ==
- List of Jamaican representative cricketers
