= Samuel Morgan (cricketer) =

Jamaican cricketer (born 1950)

Personal information
- Born: 7 August 1950 (age 76); Kingston, Jamaica
- Source: Cricinfo, 5 November 2020

Samuel Morgan (born 7 August 1950) is a Jamaican cricketer. He played in twenty-two first-class matches for the Jamaican cricket team from 1969 to 1974.

== See also ==
- List of Jamaican representative cricketers
