= Maurice Clarke (cricketer) =

Jamaican cricketer (born 1981)

Personal information
- Born: 9 September 1981 (age 45); Kingston, Jamaica
- Source: Cricinfo, 5 November 2020

Maurice Clarke (born 9 September 1981) is a Jamaican cricketer. He played in one first-class and five List A matches for the Jamaican cricket team from 2002 to 2005.

== See also ==
- List of Jamaican representative cricketers
