= Mark Neita =

Jamaican cricketer (born 1960)

Personal information
- Born: 8 November 1960 (age 66); Kingston, Jamaica
- Source: Cricinfo, 5 November 2020

Mark Neita (born 8 November 1960) is a Jamaican cricketer. He played in 45 first-class and 32 List A matches for the Jamaican cricket team from 1978 and 1992.

== See also ==
- List of Jamaican representative cricketers
