= Edward Burke (cricketer) =

Jamaican cricketer

Personal information
- Born: 28 April 1870; Kingston, Jamaica
- Source: Cricinfo, 5 November 2020

Edward Burke (born 28 April 1870, date of death unknown) was a Jamaican cricketer. He played in two first-class matches for the Jamaican cricket team in 1894/95.

== See also ==
- List of Jamaican representative cricketers
