= Maurice Clarke (priest) =

Archdeacon of Madras (1938–1944)

Maurice Clarke was an Anglican Archdeacon in India in the first half of the 20th century.

Clarke was educated at St Chad's College, Durham and ordained in 1923. After a curacy in Anfield he joined a UMCA mission to Northern Rhodesia. In 1927 he went with the Eccles Establishment to Bolarum. He also served at Secunderabad, Wellington, Fort St. George and Madras, where he was Archdeacon from 1938 to 1944. He was the incumbent at Denaby Main from 1944 to 1949; and Eastrington from 1949 to 1960.
