= Ted Burke =

Australian rules footballer

Personal information
- Full name: Edward Burke
- Born: 18 July 1877; Melbourne, Victoria
- Died: 29 January 1967 (aged 89); Heidelberg, Victoria
- Original team: Collingwood Juniors
- Height: 180 cm (5 ft 11 in)
- Weight: 81 kg (179 lb)

Playing career^{1}
Years	Club	Games (Goals)
1900	Collingwood	3 (0)
- ^{1} Playing statistics correct to the end of 1900.

Ted Burke (18 July 1877 – 29 January 1967) was an Australian rules footballer who played with Collingwood in the Victorian Football League (VFL).
