= Ernest Rae =

Jamaican cricketer

Personal information
- Full name: Ernest Allan Rae
- Born: 8 November 1897; Cross Roads, Kingston, Jamaica
- Died: 28 June 1969 (aged 71); Mona, Kingston, Jamaica
- Batting: Right-handed
- Bowling: Leg break
- Role: Batsman
- Relatives: Allan Rae (son)

Domestic team information
- Years: Team
- 1925–1936: Jamaica

Career statistics
Competition	First-class
Matches	29
Runs scored	1,118
Batting average	30.21
100s/50s	1/6
Top score	121
Balls bowled	824
Wickets	10
Bowling average	36.80
5 wickets in innings	0
10 wickets in match	0
Best bowling	4/50
Catches/stumpings	27/–
- Source: CricketArchive, 22 June 2012

Ernest Allan Rae (8 November 1897 – 28 June 1969) was a Jamaican cricketer who represented West Indies in matches before they attained Test match status. He was the son of Percival Rae and Ethalynd Maud Nix, and went to the Mico Practising School in Kingston.

Rae's first cricket was played as a teenager in the Senior Cup for Kensington; he later played for Kingston. He played for Jamaica in 1925 in three matches against Barbados. In five innings, his highest score was 19 runs, but in the second game, he took four for 50 (four wickets for 50 runs) with the ball. The following year, Rae played three games for Jamaica against the touring Marylebone Cricket Club (MCC) team of English cricketers. He bowled less frequently than in 1925 but was more successful in batting, scoring 75 in the first match. In early 1927, he scored 98 and 84 in a series of games against an English touring team led by L. H. Tennyson, but barely bowled. His success in these games against English teams placed him in contention for a place on the West Indies tour of England taking place in 1928.

Rae played in a series of trial matches in December 1927 and January 1928; in the final match, he scored 80. This performance, coupled with his previous form, secured his selection for the tour of England. Previews of the tour noted that Rae was an occasional wicket-keeper, a dependable fielder and capable of bowling leg theory. He was also described as someone who played big shots when batting. However, when Rae played in England, he bowled only five overs on the entire tour and played just seven first-class games. His highest score was 42 runs, and in total he made 74 runs at an average of 8.22. He did not play in any of the Test matches. Wisden Cricketers' Almanack, reporting on the West Indies tour, said that Rae never "achieved anything of note". According to his obituary in the Daily Gleaner, his form in 1928 was affected by bronchitis.

The remaining first-class cricket of Rae's career was played against English touring teams. Against Julien Cahn's team, he scored 121 for Jamaica in February 1929, his only first-class century. Later during the tour, he played for a West Indies team against Cahn's tourists and scored 64. The following year, he played for Jamaica against an MCC touring team and in 1932 he played against another team brought by Tennyson. Rae's final first-class games were in 1936 against Yorkshire County Cricket Club, which toured Jamaica in February and March. In one of these games, he scored 56, his last half-century in first-class cricket. He continued to be involved in the Kingston Cricket Club, and served as its president for many years, including at the time of his death.

Rae was also a prominent businessman in Jamaica. After working briefly in theatre and cinema upon leaving school, by 1921 he was co-promoter at the Rae Brothers car dealership. In 1933, he became managing director of the firm for a year and held a similar position at Nash Motor Sales from 1939 to 1940. In addition, he was involved with the trade unions and local politics; he later joined several government committees. He was involved for several years on the government's water committee, acting as president in 1966. He was also a Justice of the Peace. Rae was married and had a daughter and a son, Allan, who later played Test cricket for West Indies in the 1950s.

Rae was known as "Big Man" and had a reputation for being forceful, controversial and opinionated. Critics considered that he was not a naturally talented batsman, but improved through application and practice.
