= Frank Cunningham (cricketer) =

Jamaican cricketer (born 1962)

Personal information
- Born: 19 September 1962 (age 64); Kingston, Jamaica
- Source: Cricinfo, 5 November 2020

Frank Cunningham (born 19 September 1962) is a Jamaican cricketer. He played in nine first-class and four List A matches for the Jamaican cricket team from 1985 to 1988.

== See also ==
- List of Jamaican representative cricketers
