= Allan Rae (cricketer) =

Jamaican cricketer

Personal information
- Full name: Allan Fitzroy Rae
- Born: 30 September 1922; Rollington Town, Kingston, Jamaica
- Died: 27 February 2005 (aged 82); Kingston, Jamaica
- Batting: Left-handed
- Relatives: Ernest Rae (father)

International information
- National side: West Indies
- Test debut (cap 69): 10 November 1948 v India
- Last Test: 19 February 1953 v India

Career statistics
Competition	Test	First-class
Matches	15	80
Runs scored	1,016	4,798
Batting average	46.18	39.65
100s/50s	4/4	17/15
Top score	109	179
Balls bowled	–	24
Wickets	–	0
Bowling average	–	–
5 wickets in innings	–	–
10 wickets in match	–	–
Best bowling	–	–
Catches/stumpings	10/–	42/–
- Source: Cricinfo, 2 December 2019

Allan Fitzroy Rae (30 September 1922 – 27 February 2005) was a Jamaican cricketer who played as a batsman. He featured in 15 Test matches between 1948 and 1953 for the West Indies cricket team.

== Early Days ==
Rae attended Wolmer's Schools. In June 1988, he was celebrated on the $4 Jamaican stamp alongside the Barbados Cricket Buckle.

== Test career ==
Allan Rae was a specialist batsman who scored just over 1,000 Test runs in his five-year career, including four centuries. He also had a famous opening partnership with Trinidadian batsman Jeffrey Stollmeyer, with the duo averaging a lofty 71 in their 13 tests as a pair. His Test batting average of 46.18 was considerably higher than his first-class average of 39.65, despite his 17 centuries at first-class level and a highest score of 179. He later became president of the West Indies Cricket Board from 1981 to 1988. His father, Ernest Rae, toured England with the West Indies team in 1928.

== Domestic career ==
Rae was also the first batsman to score a century in each innings of a West Indian first-class cricket tournament.
