= Nigel Kennedy (cricketer) =

Jamaican cricketer (born 1964)

Personal information
- Born: 24 August 1964 (age 62)
- Source: Cricinfo, 5 November 2020

Nigel Kennedy (born 24 August 1964) is a Jamaican cricketer. He played in two first-class and two List A matches for the Jamaican cricket team from 1987 to 1990.

== See also ==
- List of Jamaican representative cricketers
