= George Powell (Australian cricketer) =

Australian cricketer

Personal information
- Born: 12 April 1918; Sydney, Australia
- Died: 11 April 1994 (aged 75); Sydney, Australia
- Source: ESPNcricinfo, 15 January 2017

George Powell (12 April 1918 – 11 April 1994) was an Australian cricketer. He played four first-class matches for New South Wales between 1941/42 and 1948/49.

== See also ==
- List of New South Wales representative cricketers
