= Vincent Lumsden =

Jamaican cricketer, agronomist and broadcaster

Personal information
- Full name: Vincent Roy Lumsden
- Born: 19 July 1930 (age 96); Buff Bay, Portland Parish, Jamaica
- Height: 6 ft 2 in (1.88 m)
- Batting: Right-handed
- Bowling: Right-arm off-spin

Domestic team information
- Years: Team
- 1949-50 to 1959-60: Jamaica
- 1953 to 1956: Cambridge University

Career statistics
Competition	First-class
Matches	57
Runs scored	2699
Batting average	27.82
100s/50s	1/14
Top score	107
Balls bowled	628
Wickets	11
Bowling average	32.27
5 wickets in innings	0
10 wickets in match	0
Best bowling	4/20
Catches/stumpings	36/–
- Source: Cricket Archive, 28 August 2014

Vincent Roy Lumsden (born 19 July 1930) is a former Jamaican cricketer who played first-class cricket for Jamaica and Cambridge University from 1950 to 1960. After his cricket career, he worked as an agronomist and broadcaster in Jamaica.

== Cricket career ==
Lumsden was born at Buff Bay, Portland Parish, Jamaica. A champion schoolboy cricketer, he attended Munro College in Jamaica on a scholarship from 1943 to 1949, and went to Emmanuel College, Cambridge in 1952 to study agronomy. He made his first-class debut for Jamaica in 1949-50, opening the batting and scoring 20 and 33. He scored 60 in the only match he played in 1950-51.

Lumsden established himself in the Cambridge cricket team in 1953, batting in the middle order and scoring 449 runs at an average of 22.45. Wisden noted that he "could drive the ball very hard, but his lack of adequate defence and a sense of impetuosity often caused early failures. His fielding, however, was often of special value." He had his best season in 1954, scoring 701 runs at 35.05, top-scoring in each innings with 93 and 107 in the match against Worcestershire, when he shared a fifth-wicket partnership of 176 in just over two hours with John Slack to help Cambridge to victory. His 47 in the second innings in the annual match against Oxford University helped Cambridge salvage a draw.

In 1955 Lumsden scored 99 in the match against Worcestershire, again top-scoring in a Cambridge victory, this time by an innings. He finished the season with 627 runs at 28.50. He also played a leading part in the victory over Sussex, top-scoring in each innings with 47 and 90, and taking three wickets with his off-spin. He played four Minor Counties matches for Cambridgeshire in 1955 but with little success. His form for Cambridge declined in 1956 (432 runs at 20.57, with a highest score of 47) and he was unable to play in a fourth consecutive match against Oxford owing to a finger injury.

Lumsden returned to Jamaica and played a few more matches for the Jamaica team. In his first match he returned to the opening position and scored 91 as well as taking 4 for 20 and 2 for 32 in an innings victory over Leeward Islands in 1958. His last match was against the touring English team in 1959-60.

== Later life ==
Lumsden worked in Jamaica for the Banana Board before teaching Botany and Agronomy at the Jamaica School of Agriculture from 1963 to 1965. He worked for the Jamaica Broadcasting Corporation from 1965 to 1981, his work including commentary on horse racing. From 1981 to 1989 he was an agricultural adviser to the Minister of Agriculture. From 1990 he did private consultancy in agriculture and hosted a radio program, Farm Time. He was also an operations steward for the Jamaica Racing Commission.

Lumsden married during his last year at Cambridge. He and his wife have a daughter and four sons.
