= Robert Marley (cricketer) =

Jamaican cricketer (1909–1995)

Personal information
- Born: 20 June 1909; Kingston, Jamaica
- Died: 13 May 1995 (aged 85); Clearwater, Florida, United States
- Source: Cricinfo, 5 November 2020

Robert Cecil Marley (20 June 1909 – 13 May 1995) was a Jamaican cricketer. He played in seven first-class matches for the Jamaican cricket team from 1928 to 1947. He was also a Jamaican solicitor and a member of the law firm Marley, Milner, Soutar & Co., Solicitors & Insurance Agents. He served as Deputy Clerk of Courts in Clarendon in 1937, later becoming Clerk to the Crown Solicitor between 1937 and 1942. During World War II, he acted as Legal Advisor to the Government. Marley was also active in cricket administration as a member—and later President—of the Jamaica Cricket Board of Control. He was the son of Robert Marley and Helena Maud Walker, making him Bob Marley's first cousin on the paternal side.

== See also ==
- List of Jamaican representative cricketers
