= Donald Aitcheson =

Jamaican cricketer

Personal information
- Born: 14 September 1916
- Source: Cricinfo, 5 November 2020

Donald Aitcheson (born 14 September 1916) was a Jamaican cricketer. He played in two first-class matches for the Jamaican cricket team in 1946/47.

== See also ==
- List of Jamaican representative cricketers
