= Carlton Baugh Sr. =

Jamaican cricketer (born 1953)

Carlton Baugh Sr. (born 12 November 1953) is a former West Indian cricketer who played first-class cricket for Jamaica. A right-handed batsman, he played just four first class matches, scoring 125 runs at an average of 17.85.

Baugh is the father of Carlton Baugh Jr., who also plays for the Jamaican cricket team, and who has also made international appearances for the West Indies cricket team.
