= Joseph Mullings (cricketer) =

Jamaican cricketer

Personal information
- Born: 1 April 1874; Saint Elizabeth, Jamaica
- Source: Cricinfo, 5 November 2020

Joseph Mullings (born 1 April 1874, date of death unknown) was a Jamaican cricketer. He played in six first-class matches for the Jamaican cricket team from 1894 to 1897.

== See also ==
- List of Jamaican representative cricketers
