= Colin Gordon (cricketer) =

Jamaican cricketer (born 1960)

Personal information
- Born: 8 July 1960 (age 66)
- Source: Cricinfo, 5 November 2020

Colin Gordon (born 8 July 1960) is a Jamaican cricketer. He played in four first-class matches for the Jamaican cricket team in 1982/83.

== See also ==
- List of Jamaican representative cricketers
