= Francis Lewis (botanist) =

English botanist (1875–1955)

Prof Francis John Lewis FRSE FRSC FLS (1875–1955) was an English botanist. He was Professor of Botany at Alberta University and later at the University of Cairo.

== Life ==
He was born in London in 1875.

He studied Science at Liverpool University and specialised in Botany. He started working as a Demonstrator during Botany lectures in 1900 and began lecturing in Phytogeography in 1905. He gained an MSc in 1908 and a doctorate (DSc) in 1912.

In 1912 he sailed to Canada to take up a professorship at Alberta University. He remained in this role until 1935 when he made a further adventurous decision and moved to North Africa to become Professor of Botany at the University of Cairo. He remained in Cairo throughout the Second World War.

In 1914 he was elected a Fellow of the Royal Society of Edinburgh. His proposers were James Geikie, Robert Kidston, Cargill Gilston Knott and Leonard Dobbin.

He returned to London in 1946 aged 71. He continued as a visiting lecturer in Plant Physiology at Royal Holloway College until 1948, at which point he finally retired.

He died in London on 24 May 1955.

== Family ==
He married twice. In 1901 he married Gwendolen Elizabeth Meacock who died in 1927. He later married Mitta Dickson.
