= Francis Stuart Wilson =

English cricketer and Royal Marine

Francis Wilson
Personal information
- Full name: Francis Stuart Wilson
- Born: 18 January 1883; Campden Hill, Kensington, Middlesex, England
- Died: 24 May 1915 (aged 32); Cape Helles, Gallipoli, Ottoman Turkey

Domestic team information
- Years: Team
- 1904–1905: Jamaica

Career statistics
Competition	FC
Matches	5
Runs scored	197
Batting average	19.70
100s/50s	0/2
Top score	63
Balls bowled	30
Wickets	0
Bowling average	n/a
5 wickets in innings	0
10 wickets in match	0
Best bowling	0/9
Catches/stumpings	2/–
- Source: CricketArchive, 27 November 2014

Major Francis Stuart Wilson (18 January 1883 – 24 May 1915) was a Royal Marine who was one of the first men to qualify as a pilot in the United Kingdom. He also played five matches of first-class cricket for Jamaica. Wilson was killed in the Gallipoli Campaign during the First World War.

== Early life ==
Born in Campden Hill, London, Wilson attended St Paul's School before going on to the Royal Military College, Sandhurst. Entering the Royal Marines, he was promoted to lieutenant on 1 July 1901, and in early 1903 he was posted to HMS Prince George, serving in the Channel Fleet. In August 1904, he was assigned to HMS Euryalus, attached to the North America and West Indies Station.

== Cricket ==
Wilson first played cricket for Jamaica in January 1905, against a touring English team organised by Lord Brackley (later the Lord Brackley). He appeared in two first-class fixtures, both played at Sabina Park, Kingston, as well as in a 12-a-side game for a "Jamaica Garrison" side. Jamaica, captained by Charles Burton, drew the first match and lost the second comprehensively, with Wilson scoring a half-century in both games. Wilson's three remaining matches at first-class level came against Trinidad, over a period of ten days in August 1905. Trinidad won all three matches, with Wilson, playing as a top-order batsman, failing to record a score above 40. He did, however, top-score in the first match of the series, which Jamaica lost by an innings and 123 runs. He opened the batting with George Cox – captaining the side in his only first-class appearance – in Jamaica's second innings in the third and final match, which was his last at first-class level.

== Military career ==
In May 1906 Wilson joined HMS Good Hope, part of the 1st Cruiser Squadron of the Atlantic Fleet. He was next assigned (in September 1909) to HMS Cumberland, a training ship for naval cadets. Wilson was promoted captain in September 1911, and appointed adjutant of the Royal Marine Depot, Deal, later in the year. He qualified as a pilot in May 1913, becoming the 497th person to be issued an Aviators' Certificate by the Royal Aero Club. He had trained at Brooklands aerodrome, on a Bristol Biplane. Wilson, by then a major, was assigned to the Royal Naval Division upon the outbreak of the First World War, formed from Royal Navy and Royal Marines personnel not required at sea. By October 1914, he was in command of a battalion, with a corresponding promotion to temporary lieutenant-colonel. Wilson was killed in action at Cape Helles, Ottoman Turkey, in May 1915.

== See also ==
- List of cricketers who were killed during military service
- List of pilots awarded an Aviator's Certificate by the Royal Aero Club in 1913
