= Stanton Parris =

Barbadian cricket umpire (1930–2009)

Personal information
- Full name: Stanton Elliot Parris
- Born: 22 August 1930; St Michael, Barbados
- Died: January 5, 2009 (aged 78)
- Role: Umpire

Umpiring information
- Tests umpired: 5 (1974–1983)
- ODIs umpired: 1 (1983)
- Source: Cricinfo, 18 June 2013

Stanton Elliot Parris, BSS (22 August 1930 – 5 January 2009) was a West Indian Test cricket umpire, born in Saint Michael parish, Barbados.

Parris officiated in five Tests and one ODI between 1974 and 1983. In all, he umpired 39 first-class matches between 1972 and 1990, most of them in Bridgetown. He was an honorary life member of the Barbados Cricket Association.

Parris was awarded the Barbados Service Star in the 2008 Independence Day honours list. He died on 5 January 2009 in Barbados, aged 78.

== See also ==
- List of Test cricket umpires
- List of One Day International cricket umpires
