= George Powell (Jamaican cricketer) =

Jamaican cricketer (born 1955)

Personal information
- Born: 23 December 1955 (age 70); Mandeville, Jamaica
- Source: Cricinfo, 5 November 2020

George Powell (born 23 December 1955) is a Jamaican cricketer. He played in twenty first-class and thirteen List A matches for the Jamaican cricket team from 1981 to 1988.

== See also ==
- List of Jamaican representative cricketers
