= Leroy Dujon =

Jamaican cricketer

Personal information
- Born: 22 November 1918; Kingston, Jamaica
- Died: 10 January 1967 (aged 48); St Andrew, Barbados
- Source: Cricinfo, 5 November 2020

Leroy Dujon (22 November 1918 – 10 January 1967) was a Jamaican cricketer. He played in one first-class match for the Jamaican cricket team in 1946/47. His son Jeff played international cricket for the West Indies.

== See also ==
- List of Jamaican representative cricketers
