= Charles Burton (cricketer) =

Jamaican cricketer

Personal information
- Born: 1875
- Died: 1948 (aged 72–73)
- Source: Cricinfo, 5 November 2020

Charles Burton (1875 – 1948) was a Jamaican cricketer. He played in thirteen first-class matches for the Jamaican cricket team from 1894 to 1906.

== See also ==
- List of Jamaican representative cricketers
