= Roy Miller (cricketer) =

Jamaican cricketer

Personal information
- Full name: Roy Samuel Miller
- Born: 24 December 1924; Kingston, Jamaica
- Died: 21 August 2014 (aged 89); Florida, U.S.
- Batting: Right-handed
- Bowling: Right-arm fast-medium

International information
- National side: West Indies

Domestic team information
- Years: Team
- 1950-51 to 1953-54: Jamaica

Career statistics
Competition	Tests	First-class
Matches	1	8
Runs scored	23	231
Batting average	23.00	25.66
100s/50s	0/0	0/1
Top score	23	86
Balls bowled	96	1464
Wickets	0	14
Bowling average	–	45.35
5 wickets in innings	0	0
10 wickets in match	0	0
Best bowling	–	3/65
Catches/stumpings	0/0	2/0
- Source: Cricinfo

Roy Samuel Miller (24 December 1924 – 21 August 2014) was a West Indian cricketer who played in one Test in 1953. He was born in Kingston, Jamaica.

A lower-order batsman and opening bowler, Miller played seven matches for Jamaica between 1950–51 and 1953–54, and was selected for the Fourth Test against India in Georgetown in 1952–53, replacing Gerry Gomez. Batting at number eight and trying to score quick runs, he strained his back going for a big hit and was unable to bowl in the Indian second innings. Gomez returned for the Fifth Test. Miller's only first-class score higher than the 23 he made in his one Test innings was 86 for Jamaica against British Guiana in 1952–53, and his best bowling was 3 for 65 against Barbados in 1951–52.
