= Prince Francis (cricketer) =

Jamaican cricketer (born 1957)

Personal information
- Born: 15 July 1957 (age 69); Saint Ann, Jamaica
- Source: Cricinfo, 5 November 2020

Prince Francis (born 15 July 1957) is a Jamaican cricketer. He played in fifteen first-class and eight List A matches for the Jamaican cricket team from 1982 to 1988.

== See also ==
- List of Jamaican representative cricketers
