= Joseph Holt (cricketer) =

Jamaican cricketer

Personal information
- Full name: Joseph Kenneth Holt
- Born: 10 January 1895; Trelwany, Jamaica
- Died: 7 August 1968 (aged 73); Vineyard Town, Kingston, Jamaica
- Batting: Right-handed
- Bowling: Right arm medium
- Role: All-rounder; Occasional Wicket-keeper
- Relatives: John Holt (son)

Domestic team information
- Years: Team
- 1905–1930: Jamaica

Career statistics
Competition	First-class
Matches	36
Runs scored	1,600
Batting average	27.58
100s/50s	4/8
Top score	142
Balls bowled	2,383
Wickets	26
Bowling average	40.53
5 wickets in innings	0
10 wickets in match	0
Best bowling	3/34
Catches/stumpings	24/1
- Source: CricketArchive, 20 June 2012

Joseph Kenneth "JK" Holt (10 January 1885 – 7 August 1968) was a Jamaican cricketer who represented West Indies in matches before they attained Test match status. He first played for Jamaica in 1905. He played irregularly for the team until 1911, twice passing fifty runs in a first-class innings. In 1923, he was selected to tour England with the West Indies team.

Playing in first-class cricket for the first time since 1911, he scored 293 runs at an average of 15.42 and took one wicket. He scored two first-class fifties. His remaining first-class matches were played for Jamaica against touring English teams, apart from one game for a representative West Indies team in 1929.

In 1928, he scored his maiden first-class century against LH Tennyson's team, and in the next match against the same opposition hit 142 runs, his highest first-class score. The following year, he scored two centuries against Julien Cahn's touring side, the second of which was scored for a West Indies XI. In Jamaica, he had a reputation as a good batsman in difficult situations and a bowler who could take a wicket when others had failed. He captained Lucas Cricket Club to four successive Senior Cup titles.

In later years, he was a respected figure in Jamaican cricket and his son JK Holt junior played Test cricket for West Indies.
