= Jeff Dujon =

West Indian cricketer

Personal information
- Full name: Peter Jeffrey Leroy Dujon
- Born: 28 May 1956 (age 70); Kingston, British Jamaica
- Batting: Right-handed
- Bowling: Right-arm medium pace
- Role: Wicket-keeper-batter
- Relatives: Leroy Dujon (father)

International information
- National side: West Indies (1981–1991)
- Test debut: 26 December 1981 v Australia
- Last Test: 8 August 1991 v England
- ODI debut: 5 December 1981 v Pakistan
- Last ODI: 22 October 1991 v India

Domestic team information
- Years: Team
- 1974–1993: Jamaica

Career statistics
Competition	Tests	ODIs	FC	LA
Matches	81	169	200	211
Runs scored	3,322	1,945	9,763	2,694
Batting average	31.94	23.15	39.05	23.02
100s/50s	5/16	0/6	21/50	0/12
Top score	139	82*	163*	97
Balls bowled	0	0	72	0
Wickets	–	–	1	–
Bowling average	–	–	45.00	–
5 wickets in innings	–	–	0	–
10 wickets in match	–	–	0	–
Best bowling	–	–	1/43	–
Catches/stumpings	267/5	183/21	447/22	218/27
Medal record
Men's Cricket
Representing West Indies
ICC Cricket World Cup
Runner-up	1983 England and Wales
- Source: Cricket Archive, 18 October 2010

Peter Jeffrey Leroy Dujon (born 28 May 1956) is a Jamaican retired cricketer and current commentator. He was a part of the West Indies squad who finished as runners-up at the 1983 Cricket World Cup.

He was the wicket-keeper for the West Indies cricket team of the 1980s, an athletic presence behind the stumps as well as a competent middle order batsman.

Dujon attended Wolmer's Schools. Dujon made his first-class debut in 1974, and Test debut in 1981. During his nineteen-year career, Dujon played 200 first-class matches for Jamaica and the West Indies. He scored nearly 10,000 runs at an average of 39 runs per innings, an impressive statistic when compared with other specialist wicket-keepers over time, as well as completing 447 catches and 22 stumpings. In total, he won 81 Test caps for the West Indies and was never on a team that lost a series.

Dujon was one of five Wisden Cricketers of the Year in 1989 and since retiring as a player in 1992, has worked as assistant coach to the West Indies national team and in development of young cricket players in his native Jamaica.

== Career highlights ==
=== Tests ===
Test Debut: vs Australia, Melbourne, 1981–1982
Last Test: vs England, The Oval, 1991

- Dujon's best Test score of 139 was made against Australia, Perth, 1984–1985

=== One-day internationals ===
ODI Debut: vs Australia, Adelaide, 1981–1982
Last ODI: vs India, Sharjah, 1991

- Dujon's best ODI score of 82 not out was made against Australia, Melbourne, 1983–1984

Sporting positions
Preceded by Desmond Haynes	West Indian ODI cricket captains 1989/1990	Succeeded by Richie Richardson
