= Mayotte Magnus =

French photographer (born 1934)

Mayotte Magnus FRPS
- Born: 1934 (age 91–92); France
- Occupation: Photographer
- Spouse(s): George Magnus (m. 1959, div. 1974); Jorge Lewinski, m. late 1970s/early '80s–2008 his death)
- Website: mayottemagnusphotographer.com

Mayotte Magnus FRPS (born 1934) is a French-born photographer and Fellow of the Royal Photographic Society, who has lived most of her adult life in England. She has exhibited at the Fonds national d'art contemporain (1974), the National Portrait Gallery (1977) and the Institute of Contemporary Arts (1981).

== Biography ==
After spending her early years in Paris, France, she settled in Cambridge, England, in 1959 on her marriage to George Magnus.

She started her career as a photographer in 1971, having previously been focusing on classical dance, classical guitar, choreography and painting. In 1972, she won two prizes in the Ilford International competition. She became a fellow of the Royal Photographic Society in 1973, and the following year had a one-woman show at Fnac, Paris.

In 1977, the National Portrait Gallery (NPG) commissioned her to photograph 100 eminent British women of her choice, with the resultant portraits being shown for two months in an exhibition (21 October–11 December). Choosing not only women well known to the public, Magnus rather selected her subjects "for the nature of their achievements. Each one has, by developing her own interests and talents, contributed to the community, and in working for personal fulfilment has brought benefit to others." Among the women included were Judi Dench, Margaret Drabble, Erin Pizzey, Margaret Busby, Laura Ashley, Mary Quant, Lynn Seymour, Marina Warner, Fay Godwin, Iris Murdoch, Elisabeth Lutyens, Julia Neuberger, Shirley Williams, Dorothy Hodgkin, Jessica Mitford, Edna O'Brien, Kathleen Raine, Molly Parkin, Christina Foyle, Marjorie Proops, and Dame Barbara Hepworth. It was the first photographic exhibition in the Gallery’s history to focus exclusively on female achievement, and in September 2018 a selection of the portraits was mounted in a new display at the NPG.

Magnus divorced her first husband in 1974, and during the late 1970s/early '80s she married the photographer Jorge Lewinski (1921–2008), with whom she collaborated on a series of photographically illustrated books. Lewinski died in 2008.

Magnus has worked to restore the Palais épiscopal d'Alan in Alan, Haute-Garonne, a home that she shared with her husband. The building contains a large number of paintings and photographs.

== Selected exhibitions ==
- 1972: Paris, La Fnac.
- 1973: Istanbul, Hotel Intercontinental
- 1977: London, National Portrait Gallery – Eminent British Women
- 1978: London, Great Hall in Parliament: Women, for the 50 Years of Women's Vote
- 1979: USA, San Francisco, Focus Gallery, with Jorge (Yuri) Lewinski and Yusuf Karsh
- 1980: London, Institute of Contemporary Art, Women’s Images of Men
- 2004: Seventy portraits of the inhabitants of the village of Alan, showing a French village at the turn of the millennium.
- 2005: The Seven Ages of Woman, taking William Shakespeare's theme, Seven Ages of Man, a 30-year retrospective.
- 2008: France: Carla Bayle: Photographer of the month of Photography
- 2016: L’oeil de Proust at l’Espace Bonnefoy, Toulouse, France
  - Noirs sur Blancs at Maison Patrimoniale de Barthète, Boussan
- 2018, 8 September–24 March 2019: Illuminating Women, National Portrait Gallery
- 2024: 1/11/24 to 1/12/24, 'Seven Ages of Woman', 69 Old High Street, Folkestone CT20 1RN
