= Stanley Goodridge =

Jamaican cricketer (1928–2016)

Personal information
- Full name: Stanley Roy Goodridge
- Born: 28 October 1928; Kingston, Jamaica
- Died: 29 September 2016 (age 87); London, United Kingdom
- Height: 6 ft 2 in (1.88 m)
- Batting: Right-handed
- Bowling: Right-arm fast-medium

Domestic team information
- Years: Team
- 1949-50 to 1953-54: Jamaica

Career statistics
Competition	First-class
Matches	9
Runs scored	137
Batting average	11.41
100s/50s	0/0
Top score	33
Balls bowled	1834
Wickets	26
Bowling average	33.53
5 wickets in innings	3
10 wickets in match	0
Best bowling	6/28
Catches/stumpings	7/0
- Source: Cricket Archive, 28 October 2014

Stanley Roy Goodridge (28 October 1928 – 29 September 2016) was a cricketer who played first-class cricket for Jamaica from 1950 to 1954.

A fast bowler, Goodridge made his first-class debut for Jamaica in 1950. In his fourth match, against British Guiana, he took 5 for 73 in the second innings in a Jamaican victory. Two seasons later, he took 5 for 158 against British Guiana. In his next match, against the touring Indians, he took 6 for 28 with "hostile and accurate" fast bowling in the first innings to dismiss them for 140.

He played one further match for Jamaica in early 1954 before moving to County Durham in England to play as a professional for Seaham Park in the Durham County Cricket League. He played two non-first-class matches for Durham in 1956. In one, he took five wickets against Yorkshire, all of Test cricketers.

== Personal life ==
In 1952, Goodridge married fellow Jamaican Connie Mark (1923–2007), medical secretary and later an activist for West Indians in London, with whom he had a son and daughter. The couple later divorced.
