= Rollington Town =

Neighborhood of Kingston, Jamaica

Coordinates: 17°59′N 76°46′W

Rollington Town is a neighborhood in Kingston, Jamaica. Part of it is in Kingston Parish. A campus of Kingston College is in Rollington Town.

== Notable events ==
In 2017 Jamaica Urban Transit Company (JUTC) suspended service on a line through Rollington Town because of road blocks and violence. The company's buses had been attacked by stone throwers. Service was restored the next day.

Oku Onuora formed a community school in the area and organized in the area. He distributed Abeng and was arrested in Rollington Town. Scholar and activist Walter Rodney was also active in the area.

== Notable residents ==
Boris Gardiner was born in Rollington Town. Ken Rickards, Sadiki, and Connie Mark are also from Rollington Town. Cricketers Chris Gayle and Irvin Iffla are also from Rollington Town.

== Cultural references ==
Trevor D. Rhone's play Two Can Play is set in Rollington Town.
