= Connie Mark =

Jamaican-born community activist (1923–2007)

Connie Mark MBE BEM
- Born: Constance Winifred McDonald; 21 December 1923; Rollington Town, Kingston, Colony of Jamaica, British Empire
- Died: 3 June 2007 (aged 83); London, England
- Other names: Winnie McDonald, Constance Goodridge, Connie Goodridge-Mark
- Occupations: ATS medical secretary, West Indian activist
- Years active: 1943–2007
- Known for: Jamaican Auxiliary Territorial Service and establishing a memorial for Mary Seacole
- Spouse(s): Stanley Goodridge (1952-?; divorced); Michael Mark (?-?)
- Children: 2

Constance Winifred Mark, MBE, BEM (née McDonald, previously Goodridge; 21 December 1923 – 3 June 2007) was a Jamaican-born community organiser and activist. She served as a medical secretary in the Auxiliary Territorial Service in World War II. After moving to England in the early 1950s, she became an activist for West Indians in London, after being denied her British Empire Medal. She worked to gain recognition for Black service personnel who were overlooked for their services and co-founded the Mary Seacole Memorial Association to bring recognition to the accomplishments of the noted Jamaican nurse.

== Early life ==
Constance Winifred McDonald was born on 21 December 1923 in Rollington Town, Kingston, Jamaica, to Mary Rosannah (née Fyfe) and Ernest Lynas McDonald. In her youth, she was known as "Winnie" but in later life was known as "Connie". She was of mixed ethnicity, her background including a paternal grandmother from Jamaica and grandfather from Scotland, as well as a maternal grandmother of Lebanese heritage and a paternal grandfather who had been an indentured labourer from Calcutta, India. In spite of her diverse ancestry, the family considered themselves British, largely because Jamaica was a British colony at the time. She was raised in Kingston and attended Wolmer's Girls' School.

== Career ==
In 1943, McDonald was recruited to join the Auxiliary Territorial Service (ATS) because of her bookkeeping expertise. She worked in the British Military Hospital of Kingston, as a medical secretary, typing reports of battle injuries. Upon completing 6 months of service, she was promoted to lance corporal and applied for her additional pay as provided for in the British Army regulations. The War Office turned down her request, stating that ATS soldiers were not entitled to the increase. Six months later, McDonald was promoted to full corporal and her pay increase was still denied. McDonald viewed the policy as racist, feeling that as she was in a British regiment of the Royal Army Medical Corps (RAMC) she ought to be treated like other such personnel. She said, "We were British! England was our mother country. We were brought up to respect the royal family." She fought for, but never received, what she considered the king owed her as back pay.

When the war ended, McDonald's commanding officer put in for her to receive the British Empire Medal, but her recognition was denied. She believed the denial was because she had refused to clean British officer personnel's private quarters. In 1949, when the ATS was merged into the Women's Royal Army Corps she signed up for further service. In 1952, she married Jamaican fast bowler Stanley Goodridge, and they subsequently had a daughter, Amru Elizabeth. Soon thereafter, Stanley won a contract to play cricket in Durham and he moved to England. After completing a decade of service with the RAMC, McDonald-Goodridge joined her husband with their daughter in England, where she gave birth to their second child, Stanley, in 1957.

Once the family was settled in Britain, McDonald-Goodridge returned to her work as a medical secretary. She also became involved in charitable works, community service and educational projects. The Goodridges divorced and she married Michael Mark. She joined the West Indian ex-Servicemen's Association and pressed for them to add women to the title of the organisation, continuing her fight for the recognition of women's contributions to the war effort.

In 1980, Mark founded an organisation called the Friends of Mary Seacole, which was later renamed the Mary Seacole Memorial Association. Marking the centenary of Seacole's death, a memorial service was held on 14 May 1981 and since that time, the Memorial Association has maintained the grave site. In 1989, when preparations were being made to celebrate the contribution of servicemen and women on the fiftieth anniversary of the war's outbreak, Mark began lobbying for the inclusion of West Indians and women. In an interview conducted by Jacqui Harper for the BBC programme Hear-Say, Mark expressed her frustration that the service of Black Britons was not known. She applied for a grant from the Greater London Arts Council and put together an exhibition of photographs that she was able to collect from service personnel and the archives of the Imperial War Museum for the anniversary celebration. In 1992, Mark finally received her British Empire Medal for her meritorious service during the war.

In 1993, Mark was notified that the British Government had created a bursary fund honouring Seacole to grant £25,000 annually for nursing leadership studies. Mark continued her activism, participating annually in the Remembrance Day parade until her health no longer allowed her to do so. She was also well-known and respected for her poetry and participation in storytelling events to champion Caribbean culture. In 2001, she was honoured as a member of the Order of the British Empire.

== Death and legacy ==
Mark died on 3 June 2007 at Charing Cross Hospital, following a stroke, and her funeral service was held on 22 June at St. Luke's Church in West London. Posthumously, a blue plaque, using the traditional spelling MacDonald of her forebear's name, was installed in her honour by the Nubian Jak Community Trust at Mary Seacole House in Hammersmith, former home of Mark.

In 2018, in celebration of the 100th anniversary of women's right to vote, The Voice newspaper listed Connie Mark – alongside Kathleen Wrasama, Olive Morris, Fanny Eaton, Diane Abbott, Lilian Bader, Margaret Busby, and Mary Seacole – among eight Black women who have contributed to the development of Britain. She was also named by the Evening Standard on a list of 14 "Inspirational black British women throughout history" (alongside Mary Seacole, Claudia Jones, Adelaide Hall, Margaret Busby, Olive Morris, Joan Armatrading, Tessa Sanderson, Doreen Lawrence, Maggie Aderin-Pocock, Sharon White, Malorie Blackman, Diane Abbott and Zadie Smith).

On 21 December 2018, Google posted a Google Doodle honouring Connie Mark on the anniversary of her birth (this would have been her 95th birthday).
