= 2017 Diane Abbott–David Davis controversy =

2017 British political scandal

The MPs involved

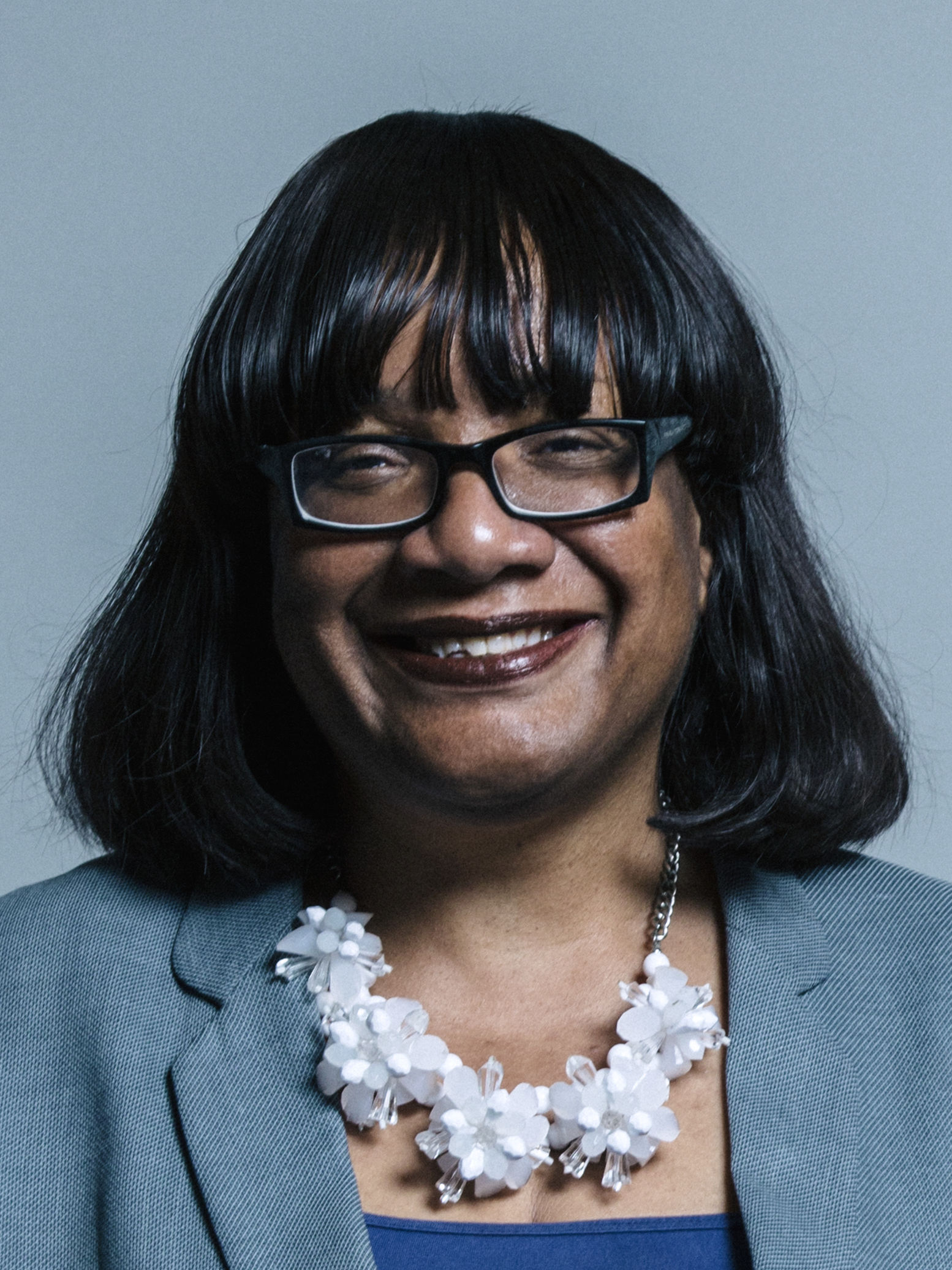
Diane Abbott, then Shadow Home Secretary

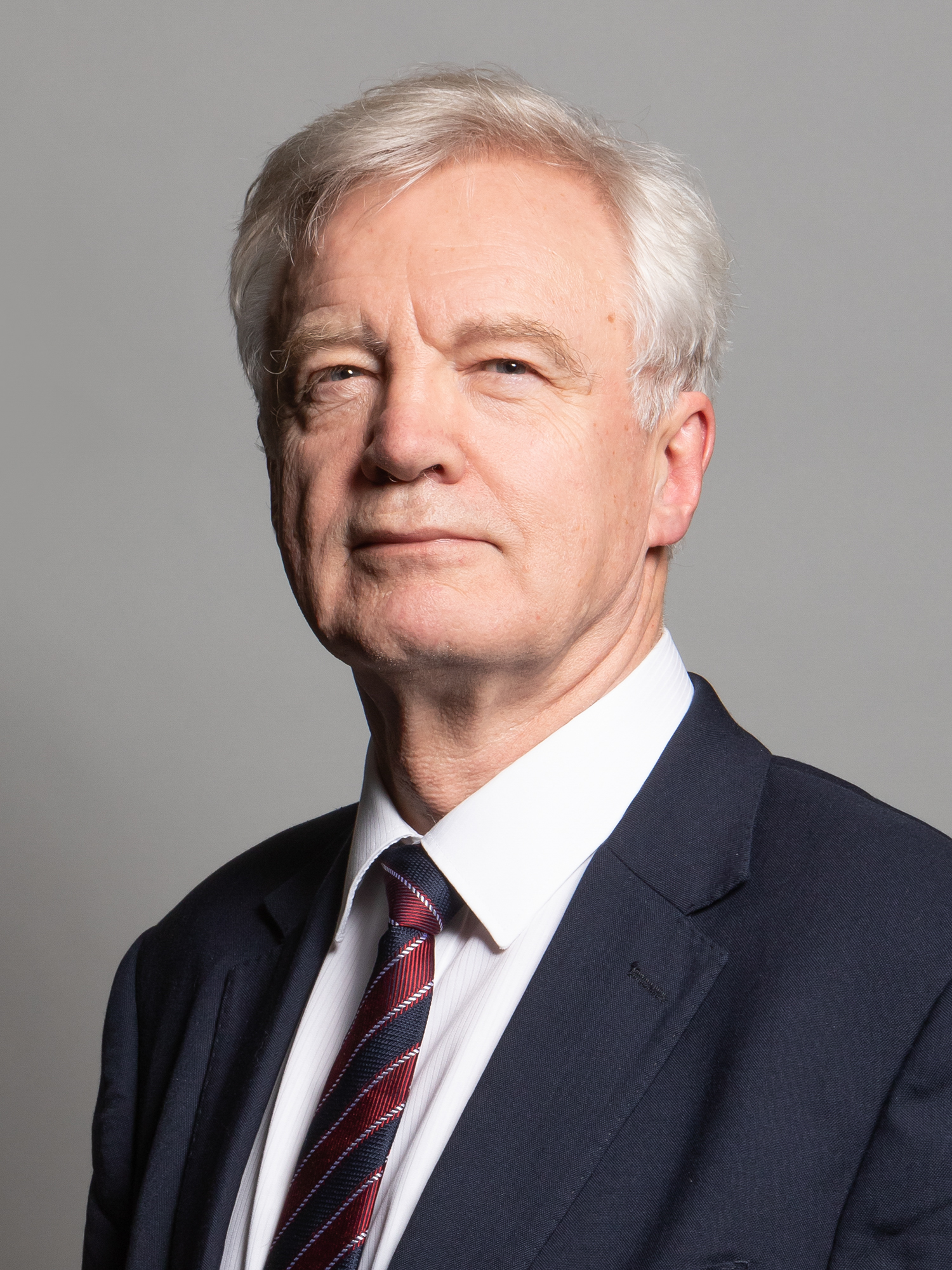
David Davis, then Brexit Secretary

In February 2017, a political controversy emerged in the United Kingdom involving the Labour Member of Parliament (MP) Diane Abbott and Conservative MP David Davis. It emerged following reports of an incident involving the two in a parliament bar. Whether or not the alleged interaction had been a whisper or kiss was speculated upon in the media. Reactions included discussions on sexism in parliament as well as the political implications of Brexit.

== Background and context ==
Diane Abbott and David Davis were both elected to the House of Commons in the 1987 general election. Abbott represents the Central London constituency of Hackney North and Stoke Newington while Davis represented Haltemprice and Howden, a rural constituency in the East Riding of Yorkshire. Both MPs voted against the Maastricht Treaty in 1992 and in 2008, Abbott made an award-winning speech in parliament on civil liberties which Davis praised as "one of the finest I have heard since being elected to the House of Commons".

In the 2016 United Kingdom European Union membership referendum resulted in 51.9% of the votes being in favour of Brexit. Abbott voted remain while Davis voted leave. Following the referendum Abbott was appointed Shadow Home Secretary and Davis was appointed Secretary of State for Exiting the European Union. The referendum had divided the two parties on Brexit, particularly Labour MPs who had triggered a snap leadership election in late 2016.

Abbott voted for the European Union (Notification of Withdrawal) Act 2017 “as a loyal supporter of Jeremy Corbyn". Abbott's position on Brexit had been under scrutiny after missing a previous vote. A week previously she had been taken ill. She voted for the triggering of Article 50. She did so while opposing the "Hard Brexit" proposed by then-Prime Minister Theresa May. Abbott had been under pressure by local Liberal Democrats to vote against due to the fact 78% of electors in the London Borough of Hackney voted remain. The vote passed by 498 to 114 with a large majority of 384.

== Controversy ==
The day following the Article 50 vote on 8 February, reports emerged that David Davis had attempted to kiss Diane Abbott in the Strangers' Bar in the Palace of Westminster, who had reportedly told him to "f*** off". Davis had allegedly greeted a group Abbott was with as he passed which included Shami Chakrabarti. Davis had been seen by journalists who alleged he had been leaning in for a kiss when Abbott recoiled before he walked off laughing. Some sources alleged that Davis appeared to attempt a light-hearted embrace with Abbott to thank her for the support in the vote, while other alleged it looked more like an attempted advance suggesting the interaction was more like an “air kiss”. A spokesman for Davis said that he respected Abbott and had been joking.

The scandal developed when private text messages allegedly sent by Davis were leaked to The Mail on Sunday. Davis said that he had whispered "thank you for the vote" referencing the three line whip on the Brexit legislation, and that he would not attempt to hug or kiss Abbott because he is "not blind". He then made an apparent reference to a Specsavers advert.

Chuka Umunna called for Davis to apologise. Davis apologised to Abbott; but was accused of sexism. Shadow Attorney General for England and Wales Shami Chakrabarti, who had witnessed the incident, appeared on Peston on Sunday and said "I think David Davis has been very silly. He was sexist and he was patronising". Abbott revealed she had received rape and death threats following the incident.

== Reactions ==
Stella Creasy branded the behaviour “sexual harassment" and Emily Thornberry compared Davis to Donald Trump. Jess Phillips said Davis was “probably drunk on Brexit smugness" adding “he wouldn't do it to David Cameron or George Osborne, so he shouldn't do it to Diane. It's unacceptable".

The incident was debated on The Wright Stuff between MP Dawn Butler and Christine Hamilton. Abbott was defended by Stephen Bush for New Statesman writing in defence of her rebuffing. Skylar Baker-Jordan wrote in HuffPost that Abbott had been a victim of misogynoir.

In the context of Brexit, the controversy was overshadowed by the resignations of Rachael Maskell and Dawn Butler from the Shadow Cabinet ahead of Article 50 vote. They had done so in protest of Jeremy Corbyn's three line whip. They were followed by Clive Lewis who was one of 50 MPs to defy the Labour whip on a later vote.

In August 2017, the former chief of staff at the Brexit Department claimed he had witnessed Davis being "drunk, bullying and inappropriate".
