= Kathleen Wrsama =

Ethiopian-born British community organiser

Kathleen Wrsama was an Ethiopian-born British community organiser. She acquired the last name of Wrsama through her marriage to Solomon Wrsama. More details about their joint work are set out in the Biography section below. As a child she moved to England and became a founding member of the Stepney Coloured Peoples Association, an organisation working to improve community relations, education and housing for black people. In 2018 she was cited by The Voice newspaper as one of eight black women – alongside Olive Morris, Connie Mark, Fanny Eaton, Diane Abbott, Lilian Bader, Margaret Busby and Mary Seacole – who have contributed to changing British history, although there has been little documentation of her life.

== Biography ==
Wrasama was brought to England as a child in 1917 by church missionaries. The experiences she suffered living in a children's home in Yorkshire caused her to run away, and she subsequently found work as a farm labourer. Moving to London in the 1930s, she worked as an extra in Paul Robeson films. She and her husband later established a Somali seaman's mission in Stepney, and in the 1950s she was a founding member of the Stepney Coloured People's Association, which was committed to improving community relations, as well as education and housing for black people. She told of her life in London's East End in an interview for the 1982 BBC documentary Surviving: Experience of Migration and Exile, and was later invited to visit a school, where she spoke about her early years and her experiences of racism.
