= Diane Abbott =

British Labour politician (born 1953)

The Right Honourable Diane Abbott MP
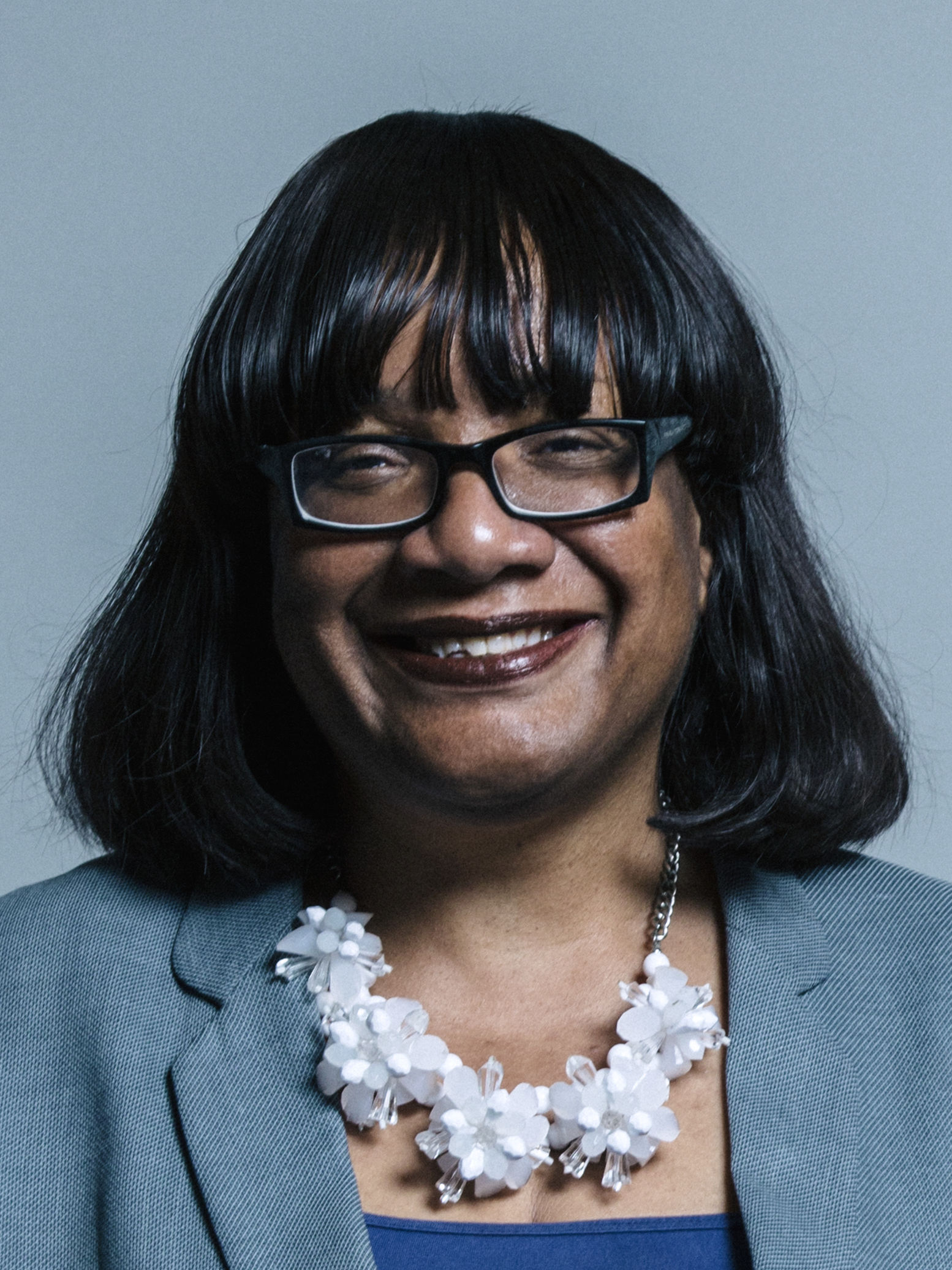
- Official portrait, 2017

Mother of the House
- Current
- Assumed role 5 July 2024
- Speaker: Lindsay Hoyle
- Preceded by: Harriet Harman (de-facto)

Shadow Home Secretary
- In office 6 October 2016 – 5 April 2020 (Note: On leave 7–18 June 2017, with Lyn Brown serving as acting shadow home secretary)
- Leader: Jeremy Corbyn
- Preceded by: Andy Burnham
- Succeeded by: Nick Thomas-Symonds

Shadow Secretary of State for Health
- In office 27 June 2016 – 6 October 2016
- Leader: Jeremy Corbyn
- Preceded by: Heidi Alexander
- Succeeded by: Jonathan Ashworth

Shadow Secretary of State for International Development
- In office 13 September 2015 – 27 June 2016
- Leader: Jeremy Corbyn
- Preceded by: Mary Creagh
- Succeeded by: Kate Osamor

Shadow Minister for Public Health
- In office 9 October 2010 – 8 October 2013
- Leader: Ed Miliband
- Preceded by: Anne Milton
- Succeeded by: Luciana Berger

Member of Parliament for Hackney North and Stoke Newington
- Incumbent
- Assumed office 11 June 1987
- Preceded by: Ernie Roberts
- Majority: 15,090 (36.9%)

Personal details
- Born: Diane Julie Abbott; 27 September 1953 (age 73) Paddington, London, England
- Party: Labour
- Spouse: David Ayensu-Thompson (m. 1991; div. 1993)
- Children: 1
- Education: Newnham College, Cambridge (BA)
- Website: dianeabbott.org.uk
- Abbott's voice Desert Island Discs, 18 May 2008

Diane Julie Abbott (born 27 September 1953) is a British politician who has served as a Member of Parliament (MP) for Hackney North and Stoke Newington since 1987. She was the first black woman elected to the UK Parliament, and in 2024 became its longest-serving female MP, earning the title Mother of the House. A former Shadow Home Secretary and Privy Counsellor, Abbott has been a prominent figure on the Labour left and a vocal campaigner on issues of race and inequality. She was suspended from the Labour Party in 2023 over comments about racism, later apologised, and had the whip restored ahead of the 2024 general election. In July 2025, she was suspended again after reiterating those remarks in a BBC interview, and sat as an independent MP until July 2026, when the whip was restored following the ascension of Andy Burnham as Labour leader.

== Early life and career ==
Diane Abbott was born on 27 September 1953 in Paddington to Jamaican parents. Her father was a welder and her mother a nurse. Both of her parents left school at the age of 14. She attended Harrow County School for Girls (a grammar school) and then Newnham College, Cambridge, where she studied history, achieving a lower second-class degree (2:2). At Cambridge, one of her supervisors was Simon Schama.

After university, Abbott became an administration trainee at the Home Office (1976 to 1978), and then a Race Relations Officer at the National Council for Civil Liberties (1978 to 1980). She was a researcher and reporter at Thames Television from 1980 to 1983, and then a researcher at the breakfast television company TV-am from 1983 to 1985. She was a press officer at the Greater London Council under Ken Livingstone from 1985 to 1986, and Head of Press and Public Relations at Lambeth Council from 1986 to 1987.

In 2024, during the Undercover Policing Inquiry into the conduct of about 139 undercover police officers who infiltrated and disrupted social justice groups, the Metropolitan Police apologised for using undercover officers to spy on anti-racism campaigners, including Abbott, during the 1980s and 1990s. Many secret police reports on Abbott were uncovered by the inquiry. Abbott criticised these activities as being racist and unjustified.

Abbott's career in politics began in 1982 when she was elected to Westminster City Council, serving until 1986. In 1983, she was active in the Labour Party Black Sections movement, alongside Bernie Grant, Paul Boateng and Keith Vaz, campaigning for greater African Caribbean and Asian political representation. In 1985, she sought to be selected in Brent East, losing out to Ken Livingstone.

== Parliamentary career ==
At the 1987 general election, Abbott was elected to Parliament as MP for Hackney North and Stoke Newington, winning with 48.7% of the vote and a majority of 7,678. She was the first black woman to become an MP.

Abbott has served on a number of parliamentary committees on social and international issues and held shadow ministerial positions in successive shadow cabinets. For most of the 1990s, she also served on the Treasury Select Committee of the House of Commons. She went on to serve on the Foreign Affairs Select Committee. She gave birth to her son in October 1991, one year before the House of Commons introduced a crèche.

At the 1992 general election, Abbott was re-elected as MP for Hackney North and Stoke Newington with an increased vote share of 57.8% and an increased majority of 10,727. She was again re-elected at the 1997 general election with an increased vote share of 65.2% and an increased majority of 15,627. She was again re-elected at the 2001 general election, with a decreased vote share of 61% and a decreased majority of 13,651. She was again re-elected at the 2005 general election, with a decreased vote share of 48.6% and a decreased majority of 7,427.

Abbott's speech on civil liberties, in the debate on the Counter-Terrorism Bill 2008, won The Spectator magazine's "Parliamentary Speech of the Year" award, and further recognition at the 2008 Human Rights awards.

Abbott chairs the All-Party Parliamentary British-Caribbean Group and the All-Party Sickle Cell and Thalassemia Group. She is the founder of the London Schools and the Black Child initiative, which aims to raise educational achievement levels amongst black children.

At the 2010 general election, Abbott was again re-elected, with an increased vote share of 55% and an increased majority of 14,461.

At Goldsmiths' College, on 26 October 2012, a jubilee celebration was held to honour Abbott's 25 years in Parliament, with participants in a series of contributions including Herman Ouseley, Linton Kwesi Johnson, Kadija Sesay, Aminatta Forna, Shami Chakrabarti, SuAndi, Yvonne Brewster, Malika Booker, Zena Edwards and others.

At the 2015 general election, Abbott was again re-elected with an increased vote share of 62.9% and an increased majority of 24,008. At the snap 2017 general election, she was again re-elected with an increased vote share of 75.1% and an increased majority of 35,139.

A speech by Abbott in a House of Commons debate on the Caribbean is included in Margaret Busby's 2019 anthology New Daughters of Africa.

At the 2019 general election, Abbott was again re-elected, with a decreased vote share of 70.3% and a decreased majority of 33,188.

At the 2024 general election held on 4 July, Abbott was re-elected with a vote share of 60%.

Abbott was given the honorific title Mother of the House as the longest continuously serving female MP, delivering her first speech in that role on 9 July 2024, when she congratulated new MPs and said: "It is a great job and you will never regret coming here. ... When I was a new member in 1987, there were only 40 female members of Parliament. Today we have 264, and some of us are glad that we have lived to see this. And I can't speak about the increased numbers of female members of Parliament without referencing my predecessor Baroness Harriet Harman, who did so much to work to have an equal and diverse House." Tributes were paid to Abbott by Speaker of the House of Commons Sir Lindsay Hoyle, as well as by Prime Minister Keir Starmer.

=== 2010 leadership election and frontbench role ===
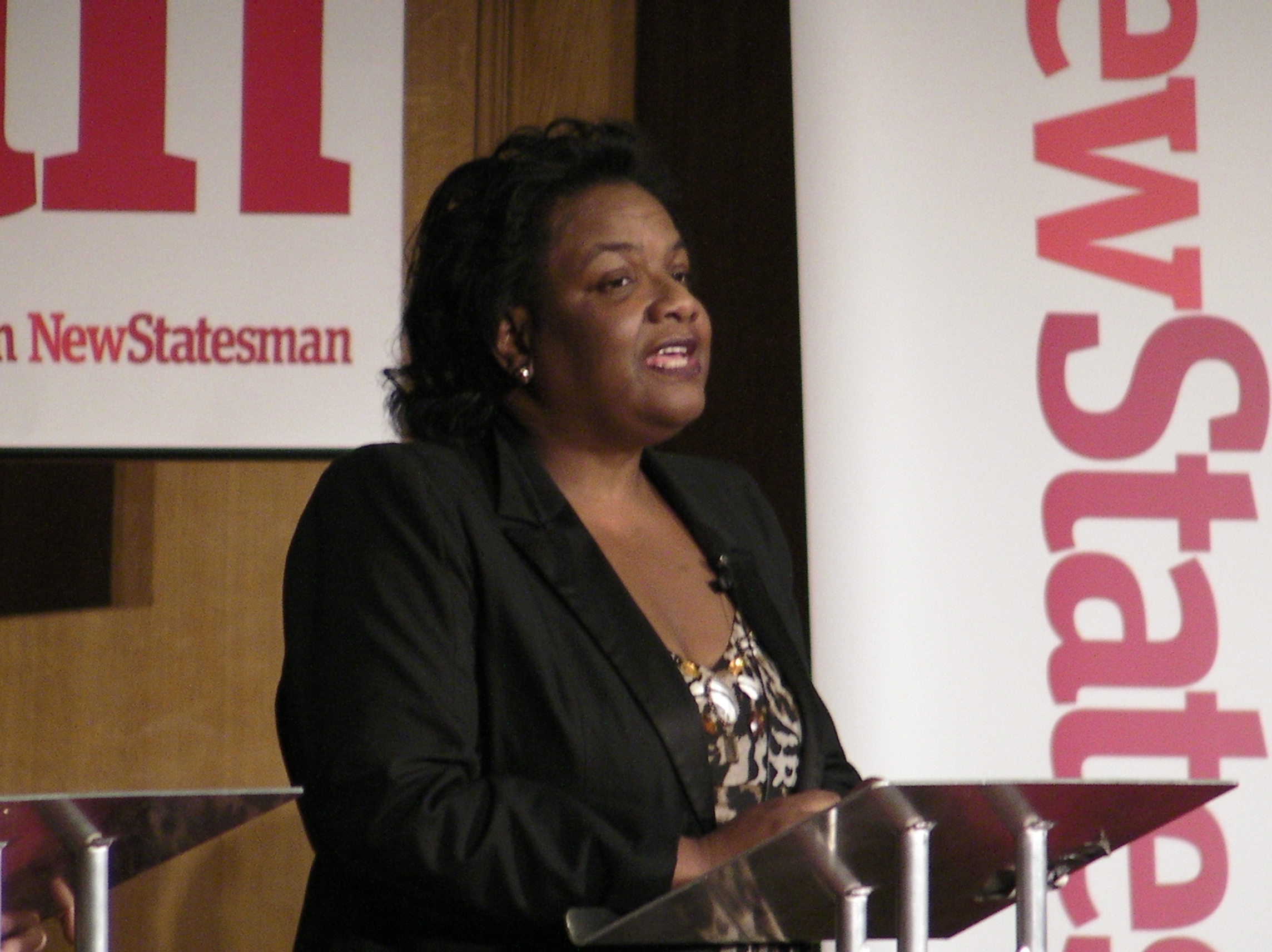
Abbott speaking at the New Statesman hustings for the 2010 Labour Party leadership election

On 20 May 2010, Abbott announced her intention to stand in the Labour leadership contest. She secured the necessary 33 nominations, assisted by the withdrawal of John McDonnell and support from David Miliband and Jack Straw, among others. On 25 September 2010, Ed Miliband was announced as the new leader of the Labour Party, Abbott having been eliminated in the first round of voting after securing 7.24% of votes.

Abbott was later appointed Shadow Minister for Public Health by Ed Miliband, taking shadow responsibility for a range of issues including children's health, maternity services, sexual health, tobacco, nursing, obesity and alcohol abuse. Following her move onto the front bench, the Telegraph said on 27 September 2011 that Abbott had "become one of Labour's best front bench performers".

On the issue of abortion, Abbott has become a vocal "pro-choice" supporter, opposing moves towards changing abortion counselling policy, and reducing the abortion time limit. She resigned from a cross-party group on abortion counselling, saying it was no more than a front to push forward an anti-abortion agenda without debate in parliament.

In 2011, she voted in favour of military intervention in Libya.

On 5 February 2013, following the Second Reading, Abbott voted in favour of the Marriage (Same Sex Couples) Bill.

=== Removal from the frontbench and 2015 London mayoral election ===
On 8 October 2013, Abbott was sacked as Shadow Public Health Minister in a reshuffle by Labour leader Ed Miliband, and replaced by Luciana Berger. On 23 June 2014, Abbott had stated she would consider standing in the 2016 London mayoral election; on 30 November 2014, Abbott announced her intention to put herself forward to become Labour's candidate in the election, but was unsuccessful in the 2015 nomination process.

She was one of 16 signatories of an open letter to Ed Miliband in January 2015 calling on the party to commit to oppose further austerity, take rail franchises back into public ownership and strengthen collective bargaining arrangements.

=== Return to the frontbench ===
A close ally of Jeremy Corbyn, Abbott was one of 36 Labour MPs to nominate him as a candidate in the Labour leadership election of 2015. Following Corbyn's election as Labour leader, Abbott was appointed to the post of Shadow Secretary of State for International Development.

On 27 June 2016, following the resignations of many of Labour's shadow ministerial team in the aftermath of the Brexit referendum, Abbott was promoted to the position of Shadow Health Secretary.

On 6 October 2016, following the resignation of Andy Burnham, Abbott was appointed Shadow Home Secretary. Following the Article 50 vote in February 2017, Abbott was involved in a controversy with fellow MP David Davis.

She was sworn of the Privy Council on 15 February 2017.

=== 2017 general election ===
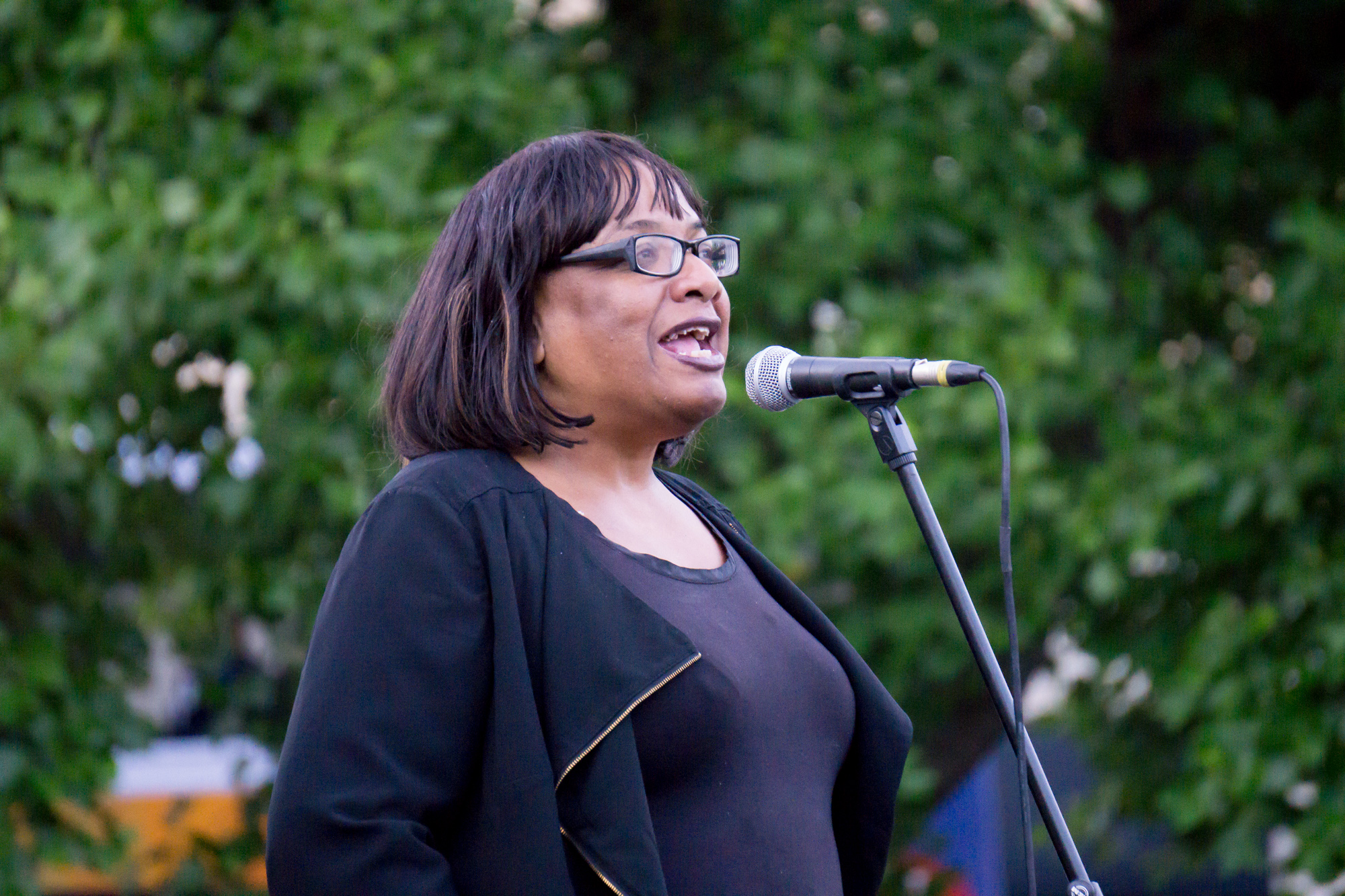
Abbott at a Jeremy Corbyn leadership rally in August 2016

On 2 May 2017, during that year's general election campaign, Labour's pledge to recruit an extra 10,000 police officers was overshadowed by Abbott's inability to give accurate funding figures. In an interview on LBC Radio with Nick Ferrari, she repeatedly struggled to explain how the promise would be funded. In the interview, Abbott frequently paused, shuffled her papers and gave out the wrong figures. When asked about her performance, the Labour leader, Jeremy Corbyn, insisted he was not embarrassed by what many pundits called a "car crash" interview.

In a further interview conducted by ITV on 5 May 2017, as the 2017 local elections results were being announced, Abbott was again unable to give accurate figures on the Labour Party's performance suggesting that the party had a net loss of 50 seats. However, her figure was corrected by the interviewer who stated that Labour had in fact lost 125 seats, at which point Abbott said that the last figures she had seen were a net loss of around 100.

Appearing on Andrew Marr's Sunday morning programme for the BBC on 28 May, Abbott's apparent support for the IRA nearly 35 years ago came up, along with some parliamentary votes Marr thought questionable. These included her advocacy of the abolition of "conspiratorial groups" such as MI5 and Special Branch in the late 1980s, both of which she said had been successfully reformed. She defended a vote opposing the proscription of a list of groups, including al-Qaeda, on the basis that some of the others had the status of dissidents in their country of origin and Abbott would have voted to ban al-Qaeda in isolation. According to Sam Coates in The Times, this appearance was arranged without the consent of Labour's campaign team.

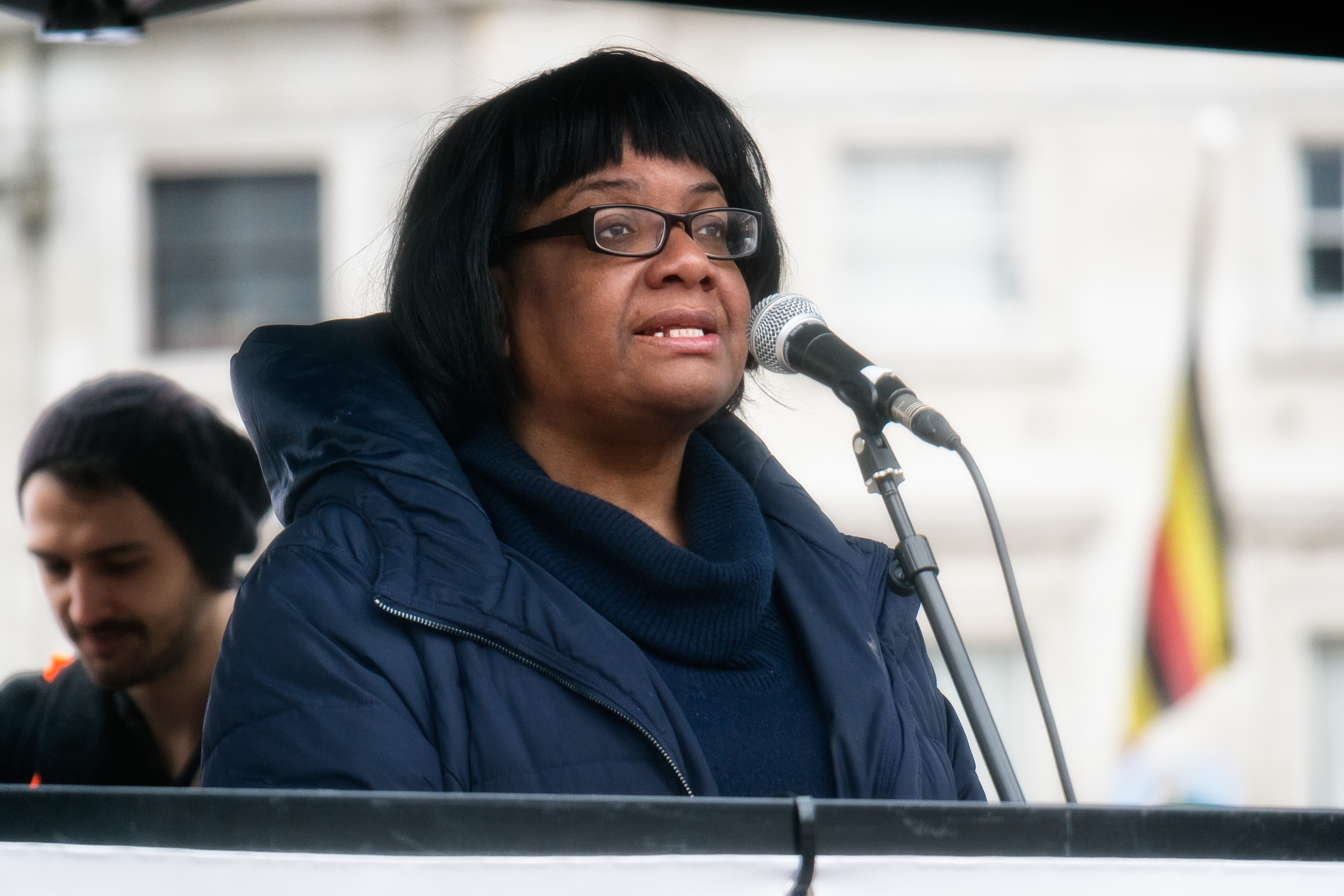
Abbott at a rally in Trafalgar Square in 2016

On 5 June 2017, during a Sky News interview, Abbott was unable to answer questions about the Harris report on how to protect London from terror attacks. She insisted that she had read the report, but was unable to recall any of the 127 recommendations. When asked if she could remember the specific recommendations, Abbott said: "I think it was an important review and we should act on it." Abbott also denied reports that Corbyn and shadow chancellor John McDonnell were attempting to stop her from making broadcasts. The next day, Abbott withdrew at the last minute – citing illness – from a joint interview on Woman's Hour on 6 June, in which she had been due to face her Conservative frontbench opposite number Amber Rudd. On 7 June, Corbyn announced that Abbott was "not well" and had stepped aside in her role as Shadow Home Secretary. Lyn Brown was temporarily assigned to replace her. Barry Gardiner said in a radio interview on LBC that Abbott had been diagnosed with having a "long-term" medical condition, and was "coming to terms with that".

The following week it became known that Abbott had been diagnosed with type 2 diabetes in 2015. "During the election campaign, everything went crazy – and the diabetes was out of control, the blood sugar was out of control", she told The Guardian. Dealing with six or seven interviews in a row became problematic because she was not eating enough food, which forced a break upon her; however, the condition is back under control. Abbott returned to the role of Shadow Home Secretary on 18 June.

=== 2017–2023 ===
On 2 October 2019, Abbott became the first black MP at the dispatch box at Prime Minister's Questions. She served as a temporary stand-in for the Leader of the Opposition, Jeremy Corbyn, while First Secretary of State Dominic Raab stood in for Prime Minister Boris Johnson.

Abbott was a supporter of Speaker of the House of Commons John Bercow, and defended him from bullying allegations made by David Leakey.

On 23 February 2020, Abbott said she would be standing down as Shadow Home Secretary and leaving the frontbench upon the election of a new Labour leader. She stood down on 5 April and was succeeded by Nick Thomas-Symonds.

In April 2020, she was appointed to the Home Affairs Select Committee.

In May 2021, she wrote in a Guardian article that if Labour were to lose the Batley and Spen by-election, Starmer should resign as Labour leader. She described the local elections as disappointing for Labour. Abbott criticised the shadow cabinet reshuffle later carried out by Keir Starmer. She told Sophy Ridge on Sky News that his demotion of Angela Rayner was "baffling". Following the 2022 local elections, Abbott said that Keir Starmer should resign if he is fined by Durham Constabulary over Beergate.

On 24 February 2022, Abbott was one of eleven Labour MPs who signed a statement by the Stop the War Coalition criticising the UK government for "sabre-rattling" over Russia’s invasion of Ukraine and for saying Ukraine has a right to join NATO if it wishes. The statement called on NATO to stop its "eastward expansion and commit to a new security deal for Europe". All eleven MPs subsequently removed their signatures after being threatened with losing the whip.

=== April 2023: Whip removed ===
In April 2023, Abbott wrote to The Observer in response to an article on racism faced by Irish people, Jewish people and Travellers, saying they do not experience racism as black people do. Labour withdrew the whip following its publication. Abbott withdrew her remarks, apologised and said: "Racism takes many forms, and it is completely undeniable that Jewish people have suffered its monstrous effects, as have Irish people, Travellers and many others." Abbott also said the letter was an initial draft sent by mistake. According to The Jewish Chronicle, the letter had been sent twice.

In September 2023, Abbott, still suspended, said that she had realised that "As a Black woman, I will not get a fair hearing from this Labour leadership".

The Labour Party National Executive Committee concluded its inquiry into her comments in December 2023 and issued her with a "formal warning" for "engaging in conduct that was, in the opinion of the NEC, prejudicial and grossly detrimental to the Labour Party". She was also directed to complete an online e-learning module, which she did in February 2024. The campaign group Momentum criticised the Labour Party and Starmer for failing to restore the whip to Abbott once she had completed the module.

=== Frank Hester ===
On 11 March 2024, The Guardian alleged that businessman and Conservative Party donor Frank Hester had said in 2019 that Abbott made him "want to hate all black women" and that "she should be shot". Hester apologised to Abbott on X (previously Twitter) after the allegations were published, stating that his comments were "rude" and had "nothing to do with her gender nor colour of skin". The comments led to Labour and the Liberal Democrats calling on the Conservative Party to return Hester's £10 million donation. Abbott described Hester's remarks as "frightening" and reported Hester to the Metropolitan Police's parliamentary liaison and investigations team.

On 13 March 2024, Abbott criticised the Speaker of the House of Commons (Sir Lindsay Hoyle) after he failed to call on her to speak during Prime Minister's Questions, which was dominated by the "race row" surrounding her. It was reported that Abbott stood up 46 times in 35 minutes to try to have her say, without success. She later criticised the Speaker, saying: "I don't know whose interests the Speaker thinks he is serving. But it is not the interests of the Commons or democracy."

=== 2024: Whip restored ===
Abbott did receive some support from Labour Party MPs. Deputy Leader of the Labour Party Angela Rayner said she hoped for Abbott to have the whip restored. On 17 March, a former deputy leader of the party, Harriet Harman, said she would be sad if Abbott's career ended without her being readmitted to the Parliamentary Labour Party. At a rally in support of Abbott, Jeremy Corbyn criticised the Labour Party for "using [Abbott's] image and story as a way of trying to raise money for the Labour party while at the same time not recognising the injustice of her removal from the parliamentary Labour party".

The Labour Party restored the whip to Abbott on 28 May 2024. The following day Abbott said that she has been barred by the Labour Party from standing as a Labour Party candidate at the 2024 general election. Starmer said that no decision had yet been taken.

On 30 May, an open letter signed by many prominent Black British figures (including Lenny Henry, David Harewood, Reni Eddo-Lodge, Misan Harriman, Afua Hirsch, Jackie Kay, Linton Kwesi Johnson, Adrian Lester and Gary Younge) claimed that the Labour Party's indecisiveness about Abbott's future was an example "of the systemic racism highlighted in the Forde report on factionalism in the Labour party commissioned by Starmer himself".

Starmer said on 31 May that Abbott would be "free" to stand as a Labour candidate.

On 2 June 2024, Abbott tweeted that she was now the Labour candidate for Hackney North and Stoke Newington at the general election.

At the 2024 general election held on 4 July, Abbott was again re-elected, with a decreased vote share of 59.5% and a decreased majority of 15,080.

=== 2025: Whip removed for the second time ===
On 17 July 2025, Abbott was suspended from the Labour Party following remarks made during a BBC interview in which she reiterated comments about racism that had previously led to her suspension in 2023. In July 2025, senior Labour Party sources told The Times that Abbott was unlikely to be readmitted to the Party. She continued to sit as an independent MP, saying: "It is obvious this Labour leadership wants me out."

=== 2026: Whip restored for the second time ===
The whip was restored for Abbott in July 2026 following the ascension of Andy Burnham as Labour leader.

In September 2026, Abbott, along with Jeremy Corbyn and all 5 Green Party MPs, was banned from entering Israel.

== Media work ==
Until her appointment as a shadow minister in October 2010, Abbott appeared alongside media personality and former Conservative politician Michael Portillo on the BBC's weekly politics digest This Week. Abbott and Portillo have known each other since their schooldays, during which they appeared in joint school productions of Romeo and Juliet (although not in the title roles), and of Macbeth as Lady Macduff and Macduff respectively.

In August 2012, the BBC Trust ruled that payments to Abbott for her appearances on This Week were made in breach of BBC guidelines that banned payments to MPs who were representing their political parties. For her part, Abbott had correctly declared the payments in the Parliamentary Register of Members' Interests. The Trust also said that Abbott had appeared on the show too often.

Abbott is a frequent public speaker, newspaper contributor and TV performer, appearing on programmes including Have I Got News for You, Celebrity Come Dine with Me and Cash in the Celebrity Attic.

Abbott was shortlisted for the Grassroot Diplomat Initiative Award in 2015 for her work on London Schools and the Black Child, and remains in the directory of the Grassroot Diplomat Who's Who publication.

== Political positions ==
Abbott has a record of differing from some party policies, voting against the Iraq War, opposing ID cards and campaigning against the renewal of Britain's Trident nuclear weapons.

=== Abortion rights ===
Abbott supported a number of amendments to the Human Fertilisation and Embryology Bill (now Act) that favoured abortion rights (along with Katy Clark MP and John McDonnell MP) – including in 2008 leading on the NC30 Amendment of the Abortion Act 1967: Application to Northern Ireland. Writing for The Guardian, Abbott argued that

When it comes to the right to choose, women in Northern Ireland are second-class citizens. They are denied the NHS treatment and funding for abortion that is permitted to every other woman in the United Kingdom.

It was reported that the Labour Government at the time (in particular Harriet Harman) asked MPs not to table these pro-abortion amendments (and at least until Third Reading) and then allegedly used parliamentary mechanisms in order to prevent a vote accordingly. Speaking in the debate in Parliament, Abbott criticised these "manoeuvres":

I speak against the programme motion because—and I say this with no pleasure—it and the order of discussion appear to be a shabby manoeuvre by Ministers to stop the full debate of some very important matters. I appreciate that Ministers did not intend this to be a Bill about abortion. I am open to the argument that we should have another piece of legislation that would enable a full debate on most of the matters in relation to abortion that have been raised as amendments and new clauses to the Bill, but there is a special case for debating and voting on the particular new clause that I tabled to extend the 1967 Act to Northern Ireland.

=== Saudi Arabia ===
Abbott criticised David Cameron's government for its continued support for Saudi Arabian-led military intervention in Yemen. In March 2016, Abbott wrote: "over the past year alone, Britain has sold around £6bn worth of weapons to Saudi Arabia, whose campaign in Yemen is targeting civilians – 191 such attacks have collectively been reported by the UN, HRW and Amnesty."

=== European Union ===
Abbott voted against the Maastricht Treaty.

Abbott campaigned and supported the Labour Party's official preference for the remain campaign in the 2016 United Kingdom European Union membership referendum. In December 2016, she told Andrew Marr that Labour policy was to respect the result of the referendum.

In January 2017, Abbott stated that Labour could oppose the bill to trigger Article 50 if Labour's amendments were rejected. She abstained from voting on the second reading of the Brexit Bill, after becoming ill hours before the vote, and later voted in favour at the third and final reading. She said she did this out of party loyalty and respect for democracy. In December 2017, Abbott did not support holding a second referendum, saying in 2018 that the UK would vote to leave again in a hypothetical poll. She supported the holding of one following the 2019 European Parliament elections. She consistently voted against the withdrawal agreement.

=== Israel and Palestine conflict ===
During the 2021 Israel–Palestine crisis, Abbott spoke at a Free Palestine rally in London condemning the Israeli occupation of Palestine.

=== Windrush scandal ===
Abbott wrote to Sajid Javid demanding that he publish the figures for people caught up in the Windrush scandal, and also tell how many Commonwealth citizens lost their jobs, became homeless and were prevented from using public services. She wrote that "warm words are not enough", and maintained that transparency was needed to give the Windrush generation confidence ministers have come to grips with what is

... clearly a systemic problem at the Home Office. In order to make good on your promise to do right by the Windrush generation and begin to right this historic wrong, you must stop covering up the extent of the Windrush crisis and publish these figures. (...) It is unacceptable and frankly scandalous that the extent of the Windrush crisis is yet to be revealed and that the home secretary is still to publish these figures. As the Windrush scandal shows, the hostile environment inevitably catches our fellow citizens who are legally entitled to be here in its net. The government now needs to stop covering up the true human cost of the hostile environment.

In August 2018, Abbott complained that there were still delays in settling Windrush claims, saying: "From the Windrush scandal to immigration detention, to these outrageous delays – it is long past time that the government takes responsibility for leaving people distressed and destitute."

=== Comments about Mao Zedong ===
In 2008, during a BBC One This Week interview between Abbott, Michael Portillo and Andrew Neil, Abbott said about the Chinese leader Mao Zedong: "I suppose some people will judge that on balance Mao did more good than harm... He led his country from feudalism, he helped to defeat the Japanese and he left his country on the verge of the great economic success they are having now." She finished by saying: "I was just putting the case for Mao."

=== Assisted dying ===
In November 2024, Abbott said she would not support Terminally Ill Adults (End of Life) Bill on assisted dying for terminally ill people. She also criticised the amount of time available for scrutiny of the bill, brought by Labour backbencher Kim Leadbeater. She co-wrote a piece in The Guardian with Father of the House Conservative MP Edward Leigh opposing the assisted suicide bill.

=== Northern Ireland ===
In May 2017, The Sunday Times reported that Abbott called for the withdrawal of British troops and Irish reunification in a 1984 interview with Labour and Ireland, a pro-republican journal. In the 1984 interview, Abbott criticised the Unionist population of Northern Ireland as an "enclave of white supremacist ideology comparable to white settlers in Zimbabwe", and called for their views to be ignored on the question of Unification, adding: "Ireland is our struggle—every defeat of the British state is a victory for all of us. A defeat in Northern Ireland would be a defeat indeed." In May 2017, while Shadow Home Secretary, she was asked by Andrew Marr whether she regretted her comments. Abbott replied that "It was 34 years ago. I've moved on."

== Controversies ==
=== Comments on race ===
In 1996, Abbott was criticised after she said that "blonde, blue-eyed Finnish girls" were unsuitable as nurses at her local hospital because they had "never met a black person before." In response, Marc Wadsworth, founder of the Anti-Racist Alliance, whose mother is Finnish, pointed out that the then-current Miss Finland, Lola Odusoga, was black, of Nigerian and Finnish descent. "She's a black Finn like me", he said. Abbott's position was supported by fellow black Labour MP Bernie Grant: "Bringing someone here from Finland who has never seen a black person before and expecting them to have some empathy with black people is nonsense. Scandinavian people don't know black people—they probably don't know how to take their temperature."

On 4 January 2012, Abbott tweeted: "White people love playing 'divide and rule'. We should not play their game." This led to widespread criticism, including accusations of racism. Abbott later apologised for "any offence caused", stating that she had not intended to "make generalisations about white people"; she said in an interview with Andrew Neil that her tweet was referring to the history of the British Empire. The Deputy Prime Minister Nick Clegg called her comments a "stupid and crass generalisation". Nadhim Zahawi, Conservative MP, said: "This is racism. If this was a white member of Parliament saying that all black people want to do bad things to us he would have resigned within the hour or been sacked." Members of the public lodged complaints, but the Metropolitan Police stated that no investigation would be launched, and no charges would be brought against her, saying she "did not commit a criminal offence."

Following the shooting of Sasha Johnson on 23 May 2021, Abbott tweeted:

Black activist #SashaJohnson in hospital in critical condition after sustaining a gunshot wound to the head. Nobody should have to potentially pay with their life because they stood up for racial justice.

The tweet was criticised by a Home Office source who accused Abbott of departing from the facts and stoking racial tensions by suggesting that the shooting was racially motivated and that Johnson was targeted because of her activism. Abbott denies that the tweet inflamed racial divides.

In April 2023, as a result of a letter Abbott wrote to The Observer in which she said racism experienced by Jewish, Irish, and Traveller people was not the same as that experienced by black people, the Labour Party withdrew the whip. Abbott had written in the letter that Irish, Jewish and Traveller people "undoubtedly experience prejudice", which she called "similar to racism", and added "it is true that many types of white people with points of difference, such as redheads, can experience this prejudice ... but they are not all their lives subject to racism." The Board of Deputies of British Jews described the comments as "disgraceful" and Labour's Mayor of London, Sadiq Khan, called the comments "simply unacceptable", adding: "Keir Starmer has done the right thing by suspending Diane Abbott."

On 15 March 2024, Abbott strongly denied unattributed briefings in The Independent newspaper that stated the Labour whip would have been restored if she had agreed to attend an antisemitism course. She called the journalism "shoddy" and the information "false".

=== Choice of school ===
Abbott's decision in 2003 to send her son to the private City of London School after criticising colleagues for sending their children to selective schools, which she herself described as "indefensible" and "intellectually incoherent", caused controversy and criticism.

According to the Daily Mirror, she said:

I'd done a lot of work on how black boys underachieve in secondary schools so I knew what a serious problem it was. I knew what could happen to my son if he was sent to the wrong school and got in with the wrong crowd. I realised they were subjected to peer pressure and when that happens it's very hard for a mother to save her son. Once a black boy is lost to the world of gangs it's very hard to get them back and I was genuinely very fearful of what could happen.

Her son contacted a radio phone-in to say that his mother was following his own wishes: "She's not a hypocrite, she just put what I wanted first instead of what people thought," he told LBC. He added that he had wanted to attend a private school rather than attend a local state school in Abbott's Hackney constituency.

=== Paid speech to undergraduates ===
In 2013, Abbott was criticised by University of Birmingham students after it emerged that in 2011, she charged the university £1,750 for a 50-minute speech to undergraduates. An online petition called on Abbott to repay the money to be used for educational purposes.

== Abuse and harassment ==
In a Guardian article in February 2017, Abbott wrote about receiving racist and sexist abuse online every day, such as threats of rape. A few days later, in an interview with Sophy Ridge on Sky News, Abbott proposed a parliamentary inquiry into the sexist and racist abuse of MPs in social media and the way Twitter and Facebook investigate cases that arise. An Amnesty International report found that Abbott was the subject of almost half of all abusive tweets about female MPs on Twitter during the 2017 election campaign, receiving ten times more abuse than any other MP.

Paul Ovenden, a former senior aide to Labour Prime Minister Keir Starmer and Head of Political Strategy in the Prime Minister's Office, was forced to resign in September 2025 when it came to light that he had made offensive remarks about Abbott. ITV has disclosed the content of the messages with names redacted.

== Personal life ==
Abbott had a brief relationship with Jeremy Corbyn, who later became the Labour leader, when he was a councillor in north London in the late 1970s. She credits him with sparking her interest in party politics and joining the Labour Party. In 1991, she married David P. Ayensu-Thompson, a Ghanaian architect. They had one son, James, before divorcing in 1993. Abbott chose her Conservative MP voting pair, Jonathan Aitken, as her son's godfather.

In 2007, Abbott began learning the piano under the tutelage of Paul Roberts, Professor of Piano at the Guildhall School of Music and Drama, for the BBC documentary television programme Play It Again. She performed Frédéric Chopin's Prelude No. 4 in E minor before an audience.

In 2015, Abbott was diagnosed with type 2 diabetes.

In July 2019, Abbott called 999 after being "chased around her home" by her son, James Abbott-Thompson. In relation to this incident, as well as subsequent incidents away from Abbott's home, Abbott-Thompson later pleaded guilty to 12 assaults and racially aggravated criminal damage and exposing himself and was sentenced to an indefinite hospital order.

In September 2020, an authorised biography of Diane Abbott was released, Diane Abbott: The Authorised Biography, by Robin Bunce and Samara Linton, published by Biteback. In 2020, Abbott was invited to participate in the television dance contest show Strictly Come Dancing. Speaking on BBC Radio 4's Today programme, she said that she refused the invitation, pausing only "for about sixty seconds". She said that, instead, she will continue to do what she has done all of her life, speaking up on human rights, civil liberties, women's rights, and representing the people of Hackney.

On 12 March 2024, after allegations that she had been targeted by racist remarks from a Conservative Party donor, Abbott issued a statement saying that "as a single woman" she felt "vulnerable" in her constituency.

Extracts from Abbott's memoir A Woman Like Me were published in September 2024 in The Guardian, where she "opens up about three pivotal moments in her life in politics".

== Awards and recognition ==
- 2008: in The Spectator/Threadneedle Parliamentarian Awards, Abbott won "Speech of the Year" for her speech on civil liberties, with her intervention being described by Conservative MP David T. C. Davies as "one of the finest speeches I have heard since being elected to the House of Commons".
- 2008: in the Human Rights Awards, jointly presented by The Law Society, JUSTICE, and Liberty, Abbott was given a Special Judges Award "for her passionate campaigning and brilliant advocacy on behalf of a range of human rights issues, most recently in opposition to proposals for 42 days pre-charge detention and in defence of women's right to abortion."
- 2008: on the annual Powerlist of "the 100 most influential people of African or African Caribbean heritage in the United Kingdom", Abbott was listed at number seven among the Top 10 Women.
- 2010; 2011: Abbott featured on the 2010 Powerlist (when the selection panel comprised Valerie Amos, Carol Lake, Kwame Kwei-Armah, Annmarie Dixon-Barrow and Michael J Prest), and the following year was ranked at number 9 on the 2011 Powerlist.
- 2012: "A Jubilee of a Different Kind" ("D-Day"), organised by Dr Deirdre Osborne at Goldsmiths, University of London, celebrated Abbott's 25 years as an MP, with discussions, readings, live performance and panel debates exploring "how positively modern Britain's migratory heritage has transformed the nation, covering journalism, education, politics and the arts" (with participants including Herman Ouseley, Linton Kwesi Johnson, Kadija Sesay, Aminatta Forna, Shami Chakrabarti, SuAndi, Yvonne Brewster, Malika Booker, Zena Edwards and others).
- 2015: Abbott was shortlisted for the Grassroot Diplomat Initiative Award, for her work on London Schools and the Black Child.
- 2017: Abbott was named "Icon of the Year" at the inaugural Viacom Diversity in Media Awards
- 2018: Abbott was listed by The Voice newspaper among eight Black women who have contributed to the development of Britain (alongside Kathleen Wrasama, Olive Morris, Connie Mark, Fanny Eaton, Lilian Bader, Margaret Busby and Mary Seacole)
- 2018: Abbott was named on the Evening Standard's list of 14 "Inspirational black British women throughout history" (alongside Mary Seacole, Claudia Jones, Adelaide Hall, Olive Morris, Joan Armatrading, Tessa Sanderson, Doreen Lawrence, Maggie Aderin-Pocock, Sharon White, Malorie Blackman, Margaret Busby, Zadie Smith and Connie Mark).
- 2020: Abbott was voted one of the "100 Great Black Britons"
- 2020: Abbott received the Patchwork Foundation's Muhammed Aminul Haque Award, for services to underrepresented communities
- 2022: Abbott was the recipient of the Weekly Gleaner newspaper's Platinum Award, "for being an iconic pillar of the black community for over 40 years"
- 2022: at the Inclusive Awards ceremony, presented by Naga Munchetty, Abbott was honoured on the inaugural Diversity Power List that recognised 50 key figures in sport, politics, education and community work who have been inspirational in diversifying their chosen fields.
- 2024: Abbott gained the title "Mother of the House", an honour awarded to the longest-serving female Member of Parliament, after the previous holder, Harriet Harman, stepped down at the general election.

== Written works ==
- Abbott, Diane (2024). A Woman Like Me: A Memoir. London: Viking.

== Notes ==
Parliament of the United Kingdom
Preceded by Ernie Roberts	Member of Parliament for Hackney North and Stoke Newington; 1987–present	Incumbent
Political offices
Preceded by Gillian Merron	Shadow Minister for Public Health; 2010–2013	Succeeded by Luciana Berger
Preceded by Mary Creagh	Shadow Secretary of State for International Development; 2015–2016	Succeeded by Kate Osamor
Preceded by Heidi Alexander	Shadow Secretary of State for Health; 2016	Succeeded by Jon Ashworth
Preceded by Andy Burnham	Shadow Home Secretary; 2016–2020	Succeeded by Nick Thomas-Symonds
Honorary titles
Preceded by Harriet Harman	Mother of the House; 2024–present	Incumbent
