= Jorge Lewinski =

Polish–British photographer and soldier (1921–2008)

Jorge Lewinski (25 March 1921 – 31 January 2008) was a Polish–British photographer and soldier.

== Biography ==
Born in Lwów, Poland (now Lviv, Ukraine), in 1921, Lewinski survived Russian occupation, internment, and forced labour in Siberia. After conscription into the Polish army, he served with Allied forces in South-west Asia. In 1942, he was sent to Britain to join the RAF, and afterwards settled.

In 1966, having developed a name for himself through the portraiture of artists, he became the pre-eminent photographer of artists in Britain. Subjects included Francis Bacon, LS Lowry, David Hockney, Henry Moore, Marcel Duchamp, Peter Blake, Pauline Boty, Gilbert and George, Barbara Hepworth, Barry Kay, William Pye, Peter Lanyon, Marc Vaux, Albert Irvin, Maggi Hambling, Kenneth Martin, Sean Scully, Bridget Riley, Reg Butler, Anthony Gormley, Julian Trevelyan, Sheila Fell, Allen Jones, Richard Wilson, and more.

Lewinski was Senior Lecturer at the London College of Printing from 1968 to 1982, and he was admired as both a teacher and a writer on photography.

He was married to the photographer Mayotte Magnus and lived between England and France.
