= Fanny Eaton =

Artist's model (1835–1924)

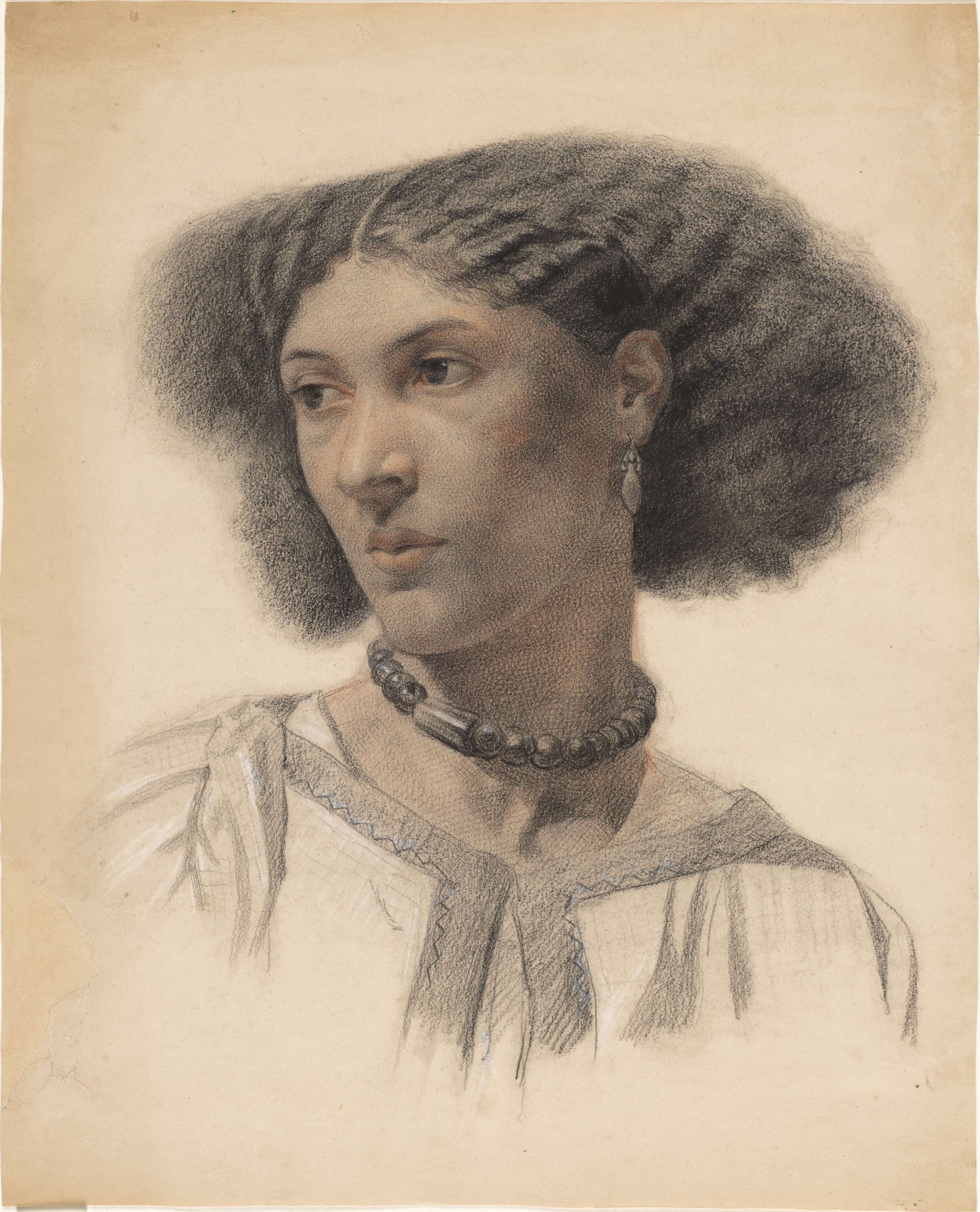
- Portrait of Mrs. Fanny Eaton (1859), Walter Fryer Stocks
- Born: Fanny Antwistle; 23 June 1835; St. Andrew, Surrey, British Jamaica
- Died: 4 March 1924 (aged 88); Hammersmith and Fulham, London, England
- Burial place: Margravine Cemetery, Hammersmith and Fulham
- Occupations: Art model, domestic cook
- Years active: 1859–1867 (art model)
- Known for: Pre-Raphaelite model
- Spouse: James Eaton (m. 1857)
- Children: 10

Fanny Eaton (23 June 1835 – 4 March 1924) was a Jamaican-born artist's model and domestic worker. She is best known as a model for the Pre-Raphaelite Brotherhood and their circle in England between 1859 and 1867. Her public debut was in Simeon Solomon's painting The Mother of Moses, which was exhibited at the Royal Academy in 1860. She was also featured in works by Dante Gabriel Rossetti, John Everett Millais, Joanna Mary Boyce, Rebecca Solomon, and others.

== Biography ==
=== Early life ===
Eaton was born Fanny Antwistle or Entwhistle on 23 June 1835 in Saint Andrew Parish, Jamaica, just ten months following the 1 August 1834 enactment of the abolition of slavery throughout the British empire. It is speculated that her mother, Matilda Foster, a woman of African descent, was born into slavery on the Elim Estate in St Elizabeth parish, property of the Foster or Forster family. No father was named on Eaton's birth records, suggesting that she may have been illegitimate. The death of a British soldier named James Entwistle, aged twenty, in nearby St Catherine's parish (burial in Spanish Town on 4 July 1835), eleven days after Fanny's birth, has been seen as suggestive that this soldier may have been Fanny's father.

Eaton and her mother made their way to England some time in the 1840s. By 1851 she is recorded as living in London, at 9 Steven's Place, St Pancras, with her mother, and working as a domestic servant. In 1857 she married James Eaton, a horse-cab proprietor and driver, who was born on 17 February 1838 in Shoreditch. Together, they had 10 children, born in the years 1858-1879.

=== Modelling ===
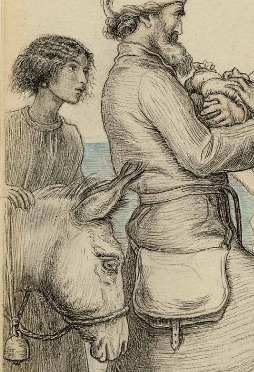
Fanny Eaton, in John Everett Millais's The Pearl of Great Price (detail) 1860, British Museum

==== Early work at the Royal Academy of Arts ====
It was during this period of Fanny Eaton's life as mother and new wife that she began modelling, both for the Royal Academy of Arts School of Painting (where she was paid 5 shillings for each modelling session, with her maximum recorded schedule reaching three sessions in a single day), for the Pre-Raphaelites, and for other less well-known artists of the period.

Her distinctive features were used by artists to portray a variety of ethnicities and characters. The earliest studies done of her are a coloured sketch by Walter Fryer Stocks and a series of portrait sketches by Simeon Solomon in 1859. These latter sketches were evidently used as preparation for Solomon's Mother of Moses, now in the collection of the Delaware Art Museum. Two specific sketches from this series depicted Eaton as the Biblical figures Jochabed and Miriam. The finished painting was shown at the Royal Academy in 1860 Exhibition.

==== Muse for the Pre-Raphaelites ====
Simeon Solomon was from a noted family of painters; his sister, Rebecca Solomon, also painted Eaton during this period. Rebecca, who studied with John Everett Millais, may have provided Eaton's link to artists in the Pre-Raphaelite Brotherhood, but this is speculation. In 1865, Dante Gabriel Rossetti employed Eaton to pose for the figure of one of the bridesmaids in his painting The Beloved. Rossetti further produced at least one other portrait sketch (c. 1865, Iris & B. Gerald Cantor Center for Visual Arts at Stanford University).

Eaton also modelled for other artists in the Solomons circle of friends, including William Blake Richmond and Albert Joseph Moore. This includes Richmond's painting The Slave (1886), found in Tate's collection, and recently identified as another artwork in which Eaton worked as the model. (Note: The Eaton family believes that Fanny Eaton was also the model for William Blake Richmond's 1886 painting The Slave.)

Eaton appears in a black chalk drawing by Rossetti, now in the Cantor Arts Centre at Stanford University in California.

The painting Jephthah (1867) by John Everett Millais shows Eaton standing in the upper right-hand side of the canvas. 1867 is believed to be the latest date at which Eaton was actively working as a model. It is not known why she discontinued this work, whether she decided to quit or if her services in this field were no longer in demand.

=== Widowhood ===
By 1881 Eaton had been widowed and was working as a seamstress. In the final years of her life, Eaton worked as a domestic cook on the Isle of Wight for a Portsea-based wine merchant and his wife, John and Fanny Hall. By 1911, however, Fanny is said to be residing with family in Hammersmith with her daughter Julia, son-in-law Thomas Powell and grandchildren Baden and Connie Powell. After a long life as a working-class émigrée, Fanny Antwisle Eaton died in Acton on 4 March 1924 at the age of 88 from senile decay and syncope. She is buried in Margravine Road Cemetery in Hammersmith.

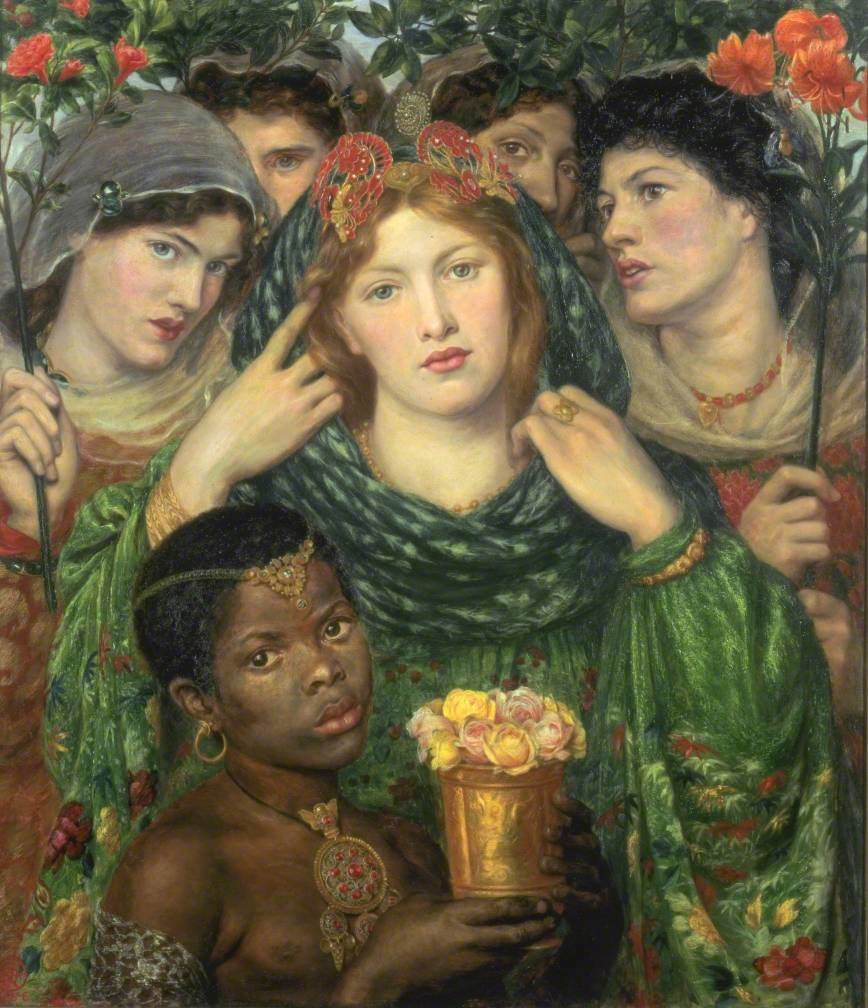
Dante Gabriel Rossetti, The Beloved (Fanny Eaton, rear, second from right), 1862, Tate Britain

== Legacy ==
The first exhibition entirely focused on depictions of black people in British Victorian art, Black Victorians: Black People in British Art 1800-1900, opened in Manchester in 2005. The "mesmerising" Fanny Eaton paintings were accorded a prominent place, with Albert Joseph Moore's Mother of Sisera and Rossetti's The Beloved on display. Reviewers responded with a 21st-century disquietude to the viewing of these paintings, particularly Rossetti's depiction of Eaton: "she is an object, not a subject." Another critic pointed out that Rossetti's painting, inspired by the Song of Solomon, is "Anglocentric", "the issue is not simply that the dark-skinned attendants are shown in a subservient role: it is that the central figure who Rossetti depicts as white should be black", as the "beloved" in Song of Solomon is described as "black and beautiful".

A Victorian critic, who had written these words in 1867, was quoted, "'A black is eminently picturesque, his colour can be turned to good account in picture-making.'" The prevailing reaction to the exhibition appears to have been alarm at the exploitation that had taken place in Fanny Eaton's times.

These observations complicate Eaton's legacy. Of Eaton's own opinions regarding either her work or legacy, nothing is known. The researches to retrieve her life story were initiated late in the 20th century. Exciting new depictions of the Jamaican-born woman have been uncovered, and catalogued, over the past decades, but Eaton herself is not known to have left letters or writing behind, and there are no known contemporary accounts of her opinions or conversations. Many of her biographies make statements along the following lines: "her decision to model was driven by the need to support her family," While this seems likely, in actuality, Eaton's motivations remain unknown.

The 2019 Pre-Raphaelite Sisters Exhibition at the National Portrait Gallery in London marked a further step in Fanny Eaton's legacy. Here, she is described as having, through her marital status, "escaped a crossover role as a lover, though enjoyed some success as a model." As of 2020, Eaton is celebrated for "her position as an artistic muse and Victorian Britain’s most visible woman of colour."

== Gallery ==
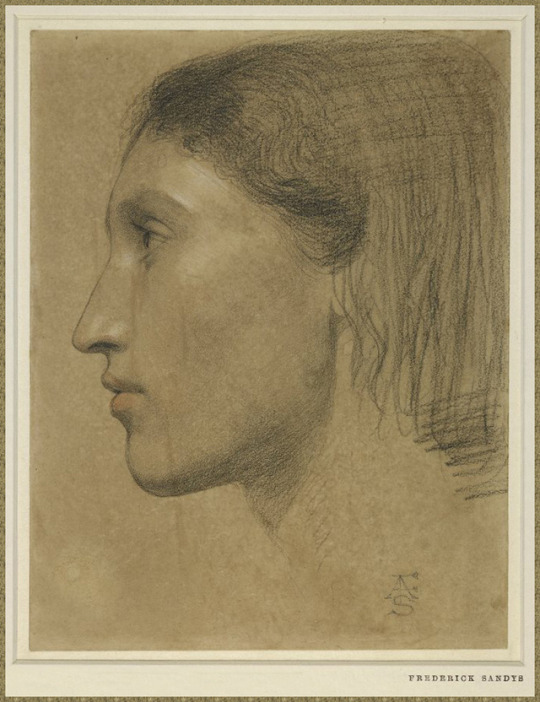
Fanny Eaton, by Frederick Sandys (1860) British Museum

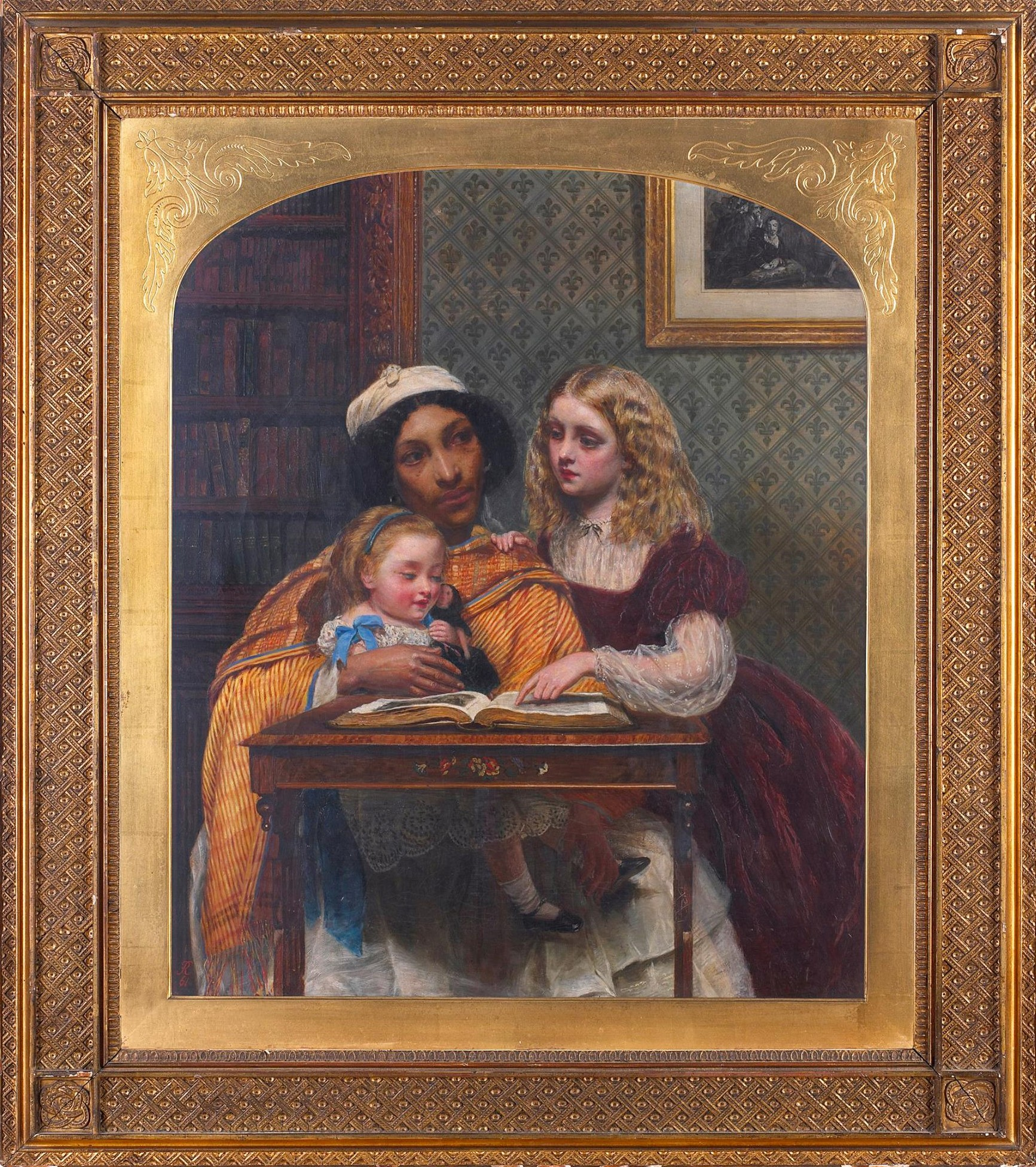
The Young Teacher (1861); Rebecca Solomon

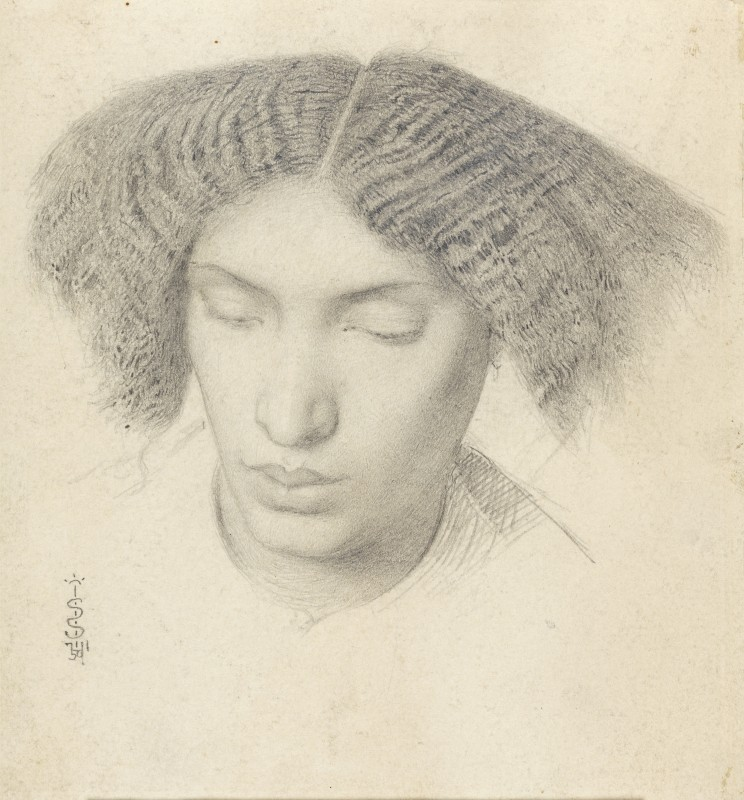
Mrs. Fanny Eaton (1859); Simeon Solomon

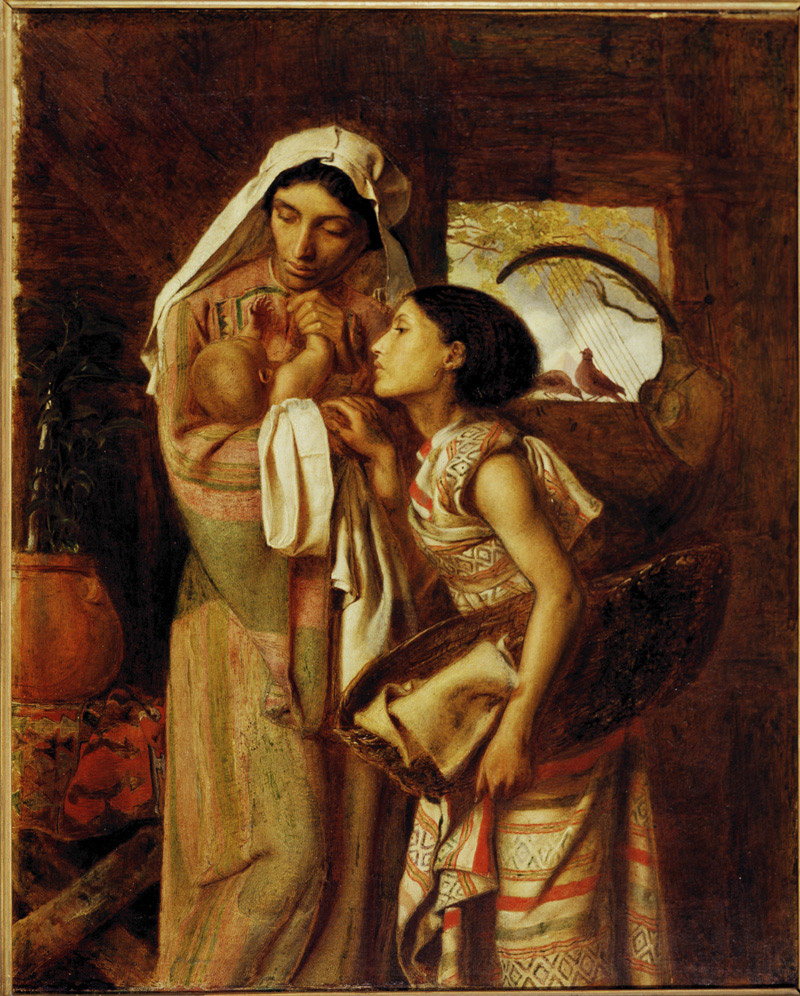
The Mother of Moses (1860); Simeon Solomon

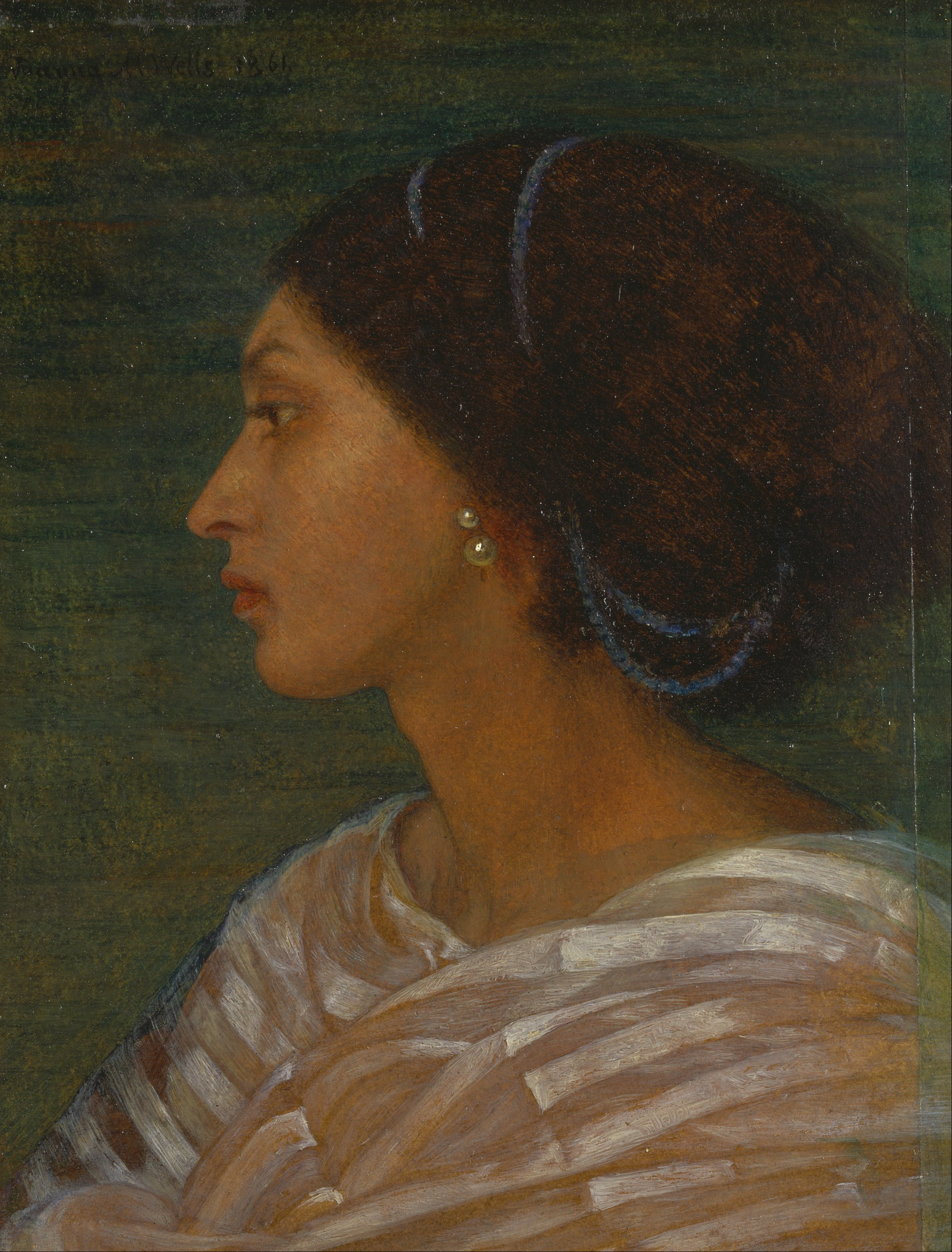
Head of a Mulatto Woman [Mrs. Eaton] (1859); Joanna Boyce Wells

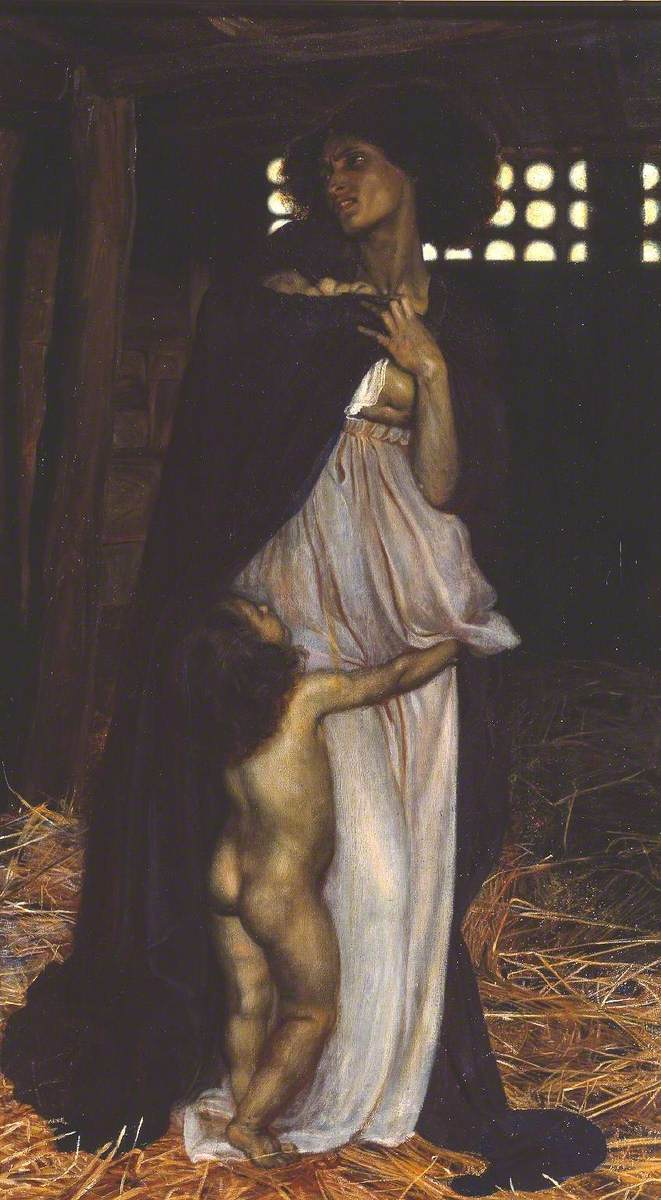
The Slave (1886); William Blake Richmond

== Commemoration ==
- In 2018, in celebration of the 100th anniversary of women's right to vote, The Voice newspaper listed Eaton – alongside Kathleen Wrasama, Olive Morris, Connie Mark, Diane Abbott, Lilian Bader, Margaret Busby, and Mary Seacole – among eight Black women who have contributed to the development of Britain.
- In October 2019 to January 2020, she was one of 12 women included in the Pre-Raphaelite Sisters exhibition at London's National Portrait Gallery.
- On 26 April 2020, an art history short about her featured in the programme hosted by BBC Radio 1 film critic Ali Plumb, Get Animated! Introducing BBC Arts and also on BBC New Creatives website.
- To mark Black History Month in October 2020, Prima magazine named Eaton as one of six Black British women – together with Margaret Busby, Claudia Jones, Mary Prince, Lilian Bader and Olive Morris – who "changed the world".
- On 15 October 2020, poet Maz Hedgehog performed a poem about Eaton as part of BBC Blue Peter's Black History Month poetry segment.
- On 18 November 2020, she was commemorated with a Google Doodle.
- As part of its Black History Month programme in October 2022, Queen's Park Community Council staged Out of the Picture, a one-woman show telling the story of Eaton's life. Written by art historian Angela Bolger, who co-directed with the actress Faith Tingle-Bartoli, the show starred actor Samya De Meo and featured digital prints of paintings featuring Eaton which had been licensed by their current owners.

== List of Eaton's appearances in artists' work ==
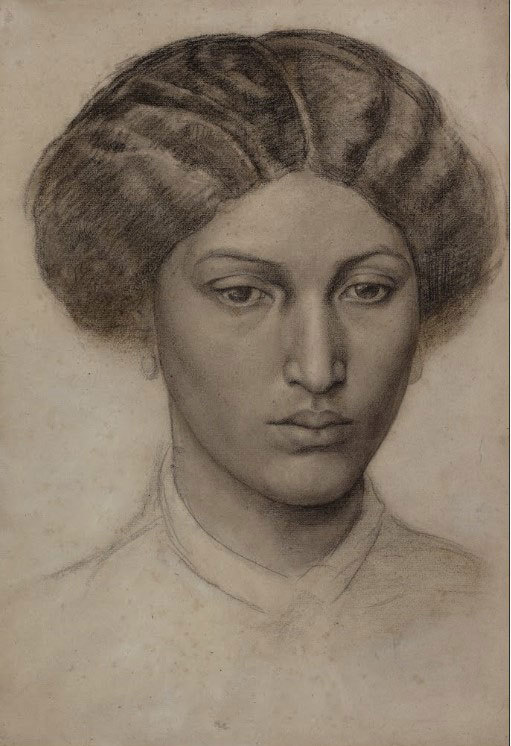
Study of a Young Woman ( c1865) Dante Gabriel Rossetti (Cantor Center for Visual Arts at Stanford University)

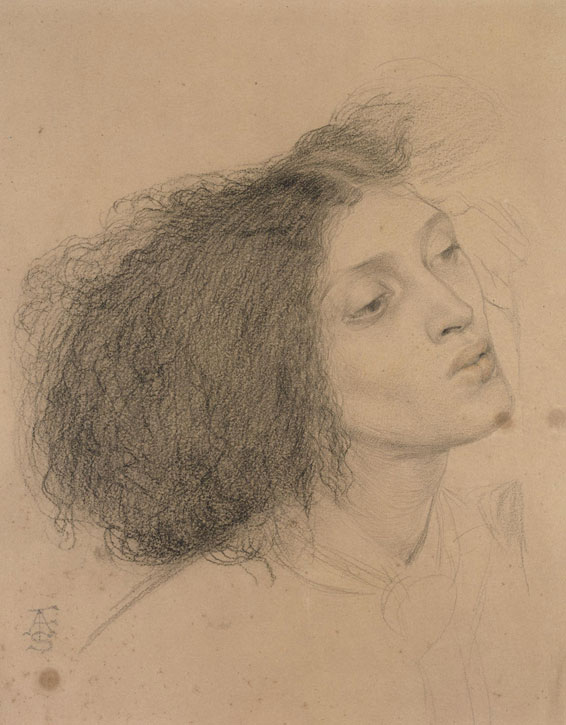
Fanny Eaton as Morgan le Fay (1862), Frederick Sandys, Victoria and Albert Museum

=== Canon ===
==== Joanna Boyce Wells ====
- Fanny Eaton (1861); oils, bust-length portrait. Yale Center for British Art
- Sketches of Fanny Eaton (1861); pages in artist's sketchbook. British Museum

==== John Everett Millais ====
- Parables of Our Lord: The Pearl of Great Price (1860); ink drawing with some watercolor wash, biblical scene. Eaton appears as a youthful Levantine. British Museum
- Jephthah (1867); biblical scene in oils. Eaton, at rear right, wears the dress of a household servant. National Museum of Wales

==== Albert Moore ====
- Mother of Sisera (1861); biblical portrait in oils. Eaton, in a rich collar necklace, models the mother of Sisera, commander of the Canaanite army. Tullie House Museum and Art Gallery
- Study of Fanny Eaton, seated, wash and graphite. National Gallery of Canada, Ottawa.

==== Dante Gabriel Rossetti ====
- Study of a Young Woman [Mrs. Eaton] (1863-1865); study drawing of head in black chalk and charcoal. Cantor Arts Center, Stanford University
- The Beloved (1865); biblical scene in oils. Eaton is portrayed as a bridesmaid to the bride in the Song of Songs.

==== Frederick Sandys ====
- Study of the head of a young mulatto woman, full face (c. 1859); study drawing of head in black and red chalk. Art Gallery NSW
- Study of Fanny Eaton; seen in profile to left (1860); study drawing in black, red and white chalk, on buff paper. British Museum.
- Study for the head of Morgan le Fay (1862); study drawing of head in pencil and red chalk, Eaton in the character of Morgan le Fay. Victoria and Albert Museum

==== Rebecca Solomon ====
- A Young Teacher (1860); genre scene in oils. Eaton is portrayed as an Indian house servant. Princeton University Art Museum

==== Simeon Solomon ====
- Portrait of Mrs Fanny Eaton (1859); study drawing of head. Fitzwilliam Museum
- Portrait of Mrs Fanny Eaton, profile left (1859); study drawing of head. Fitzwilliam Museum
- Portrait of Fanny Eaton (1860); study drawing of head. Metropolitan Museum of Art
- The Mother of Moses (c. 1860); biblical scene in oils. Eaton appears as the Levantine figures of Jochebed and Miriam. Delaware Art Museum

==== Walter Fryer Stocks ====
- Portrait of Mrs Fanny Eaton (1860); study drawing of head and shoulders in black, red, and white chalk. Princeton University Art Museum

=== Awaiting further research ===
==== William Blake Richmond ====
- The Slave (1886) genre scene in oils. As of 2022, the date, uncertain subject matter, and current state of the research have not definitively confirmed this as a portrait of Fanny Eaton or members of her family.

== See also ==
- Laure (art model)
- Joseph (art model)
- Elizabeth Siddal
