= Margaret Busby =

Publisher, writer and editor (born 1944)

Margaret Busby CBE, Hon. FRSL
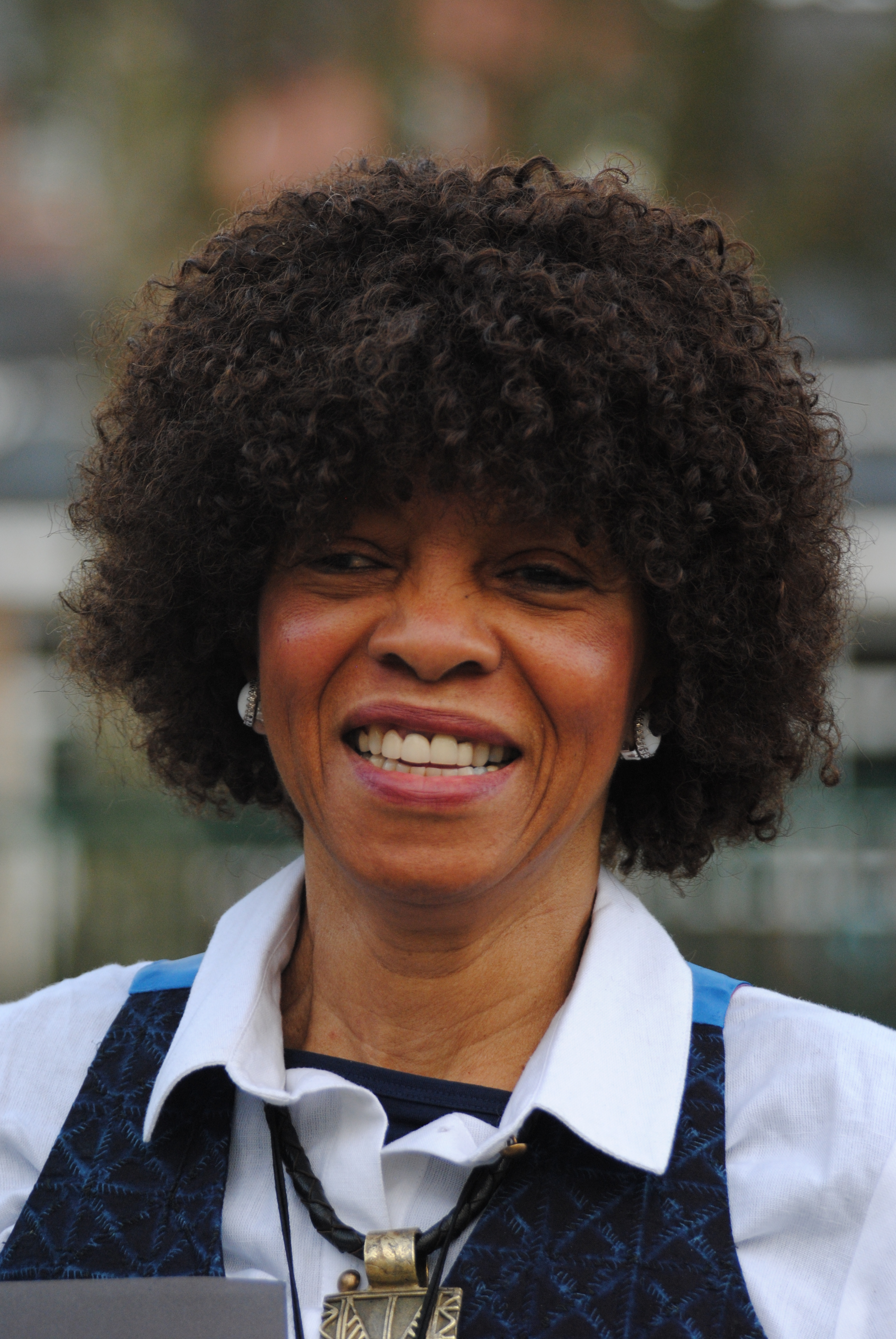
- Busby in February 2019
- Born: Margaret Yvonne Busby; 1944 (age 81–82); Accra, Gold Coast (now Ghana)
- Other name: Nana Akua Ackon
- Education: Bedford College, London University
- Occupations: Publisher; editor; writer; broadcaster
- Notable work: Daughters of Africa (1992); New Daughters of Africa (2019)
- Relatives: Moira Stuart (cousin); Phyllis Christian (cousin); Clara Marguerite Christian (aunt); Essi Matilda Forster (aunt); Kathryn Busby (niece)
- Busby's voice recorded February 2019

Margaret Yvonne Busby, CBE, Hon. FRSL (born 1944), also known as Nana Akua Ackon, is a Ghanaian-born publisher, editor, writer and broadcaster, resident in the UK. She was Britain's youngest publisher as well as the first black female book publisher in the UK when she and Clive Allison (1944–2011) co-founded the London-based publishing house Allison and Busby (A & B) in the 1960s. She edited the anthology Daughters of Africa (1992), and its 2019 follow-up New Daughters of Africa. She is a recipient of the Benson Medal from the Royal Society of Literature. In 2020, she was voted one of the "100 Great Black Britons". In 2021, she was honoured with the London Book Fair Lifetime Achievement Award. In 2023, Busby was named as president of English PEN.

== Education and early years ==
Margaret Yvonne Busby was born in 1944, in Accra, Gold Coast (present-day Ghana). Her parents were Dr George Busby and Mrs Sarah Busby (née Christian), who both had family links to the Caribbean, particularly to Trinidad, Barbados and Dominica. Her Barbados-born father, Dr Busby (1899–1980) was a lifelong friend of Kwame Nkrumah's mentor George Padmore and attended school in Trinidad with C. L. R. James at Queen's Royal College, winning the Island Scholarship. This, in turn, enabled him to travel to Britain to study medicine, in 1919. After initial studies at Edinburgh University, George Busby transferred to University College, Dublin, to complete his medical qualifications, and then practised as a doctor in Walthamstow, London (where there is a blue plaque in his honour), before relocating to settle in the Gold Coast in 1929. Through her maternal line, she is a cousin of BBC newscaster Moira Stuart. Her grandfather was Dominica-born George James Christian (1869–1940), a delegate at the First Pan-African Conference, in London, in 1900, who migrated to the Gold Coast in 1902.

Her parents sent their three children to be educated in England, when Busby was five. She and her sister first attended a school in the Lake District, followed by Charters Towers School, an international girls' boarding-school in Bexhill-on-Sea, Sussex. After passing her O-levels there, aged 14, Busby left school at 15, went back to Ghana and took her A-levels at 16, then spent a year at a college in Cambridge so as not to begin university too young. From the age of 17, she studied English at Bedford College, London University, where she edited her college literary magazine, as well as publishing her own poetry. She graduated with a BA Honours degree, at the age of 20. She was married to British jazz musician and educator, Lionel Grigson (1942–1994).

== Publishing career ==
While still at university, she met her future business partner, Clive Allison, at a party in Bayswater Road, and they decided to start a publishing company. After graduating, Busby briefly worked at the Cresset Press – part of the Barrie Group – while setting up Allison and Busby (A & B), whose first books were published in 1967, making her the then youngest publisher as well as the first African woman book publisher in the UK – an achievement she has assessed by saying: "[I]t is easy enough to be the first, we can each try something and be the first woman or the first African woman to do X, Y or Z. But, if it's something worthwhile you don't want to be the only. ...I hope that I can, in any way, inspire someone to do what I have done but learn from my mistakes and do better than I have done."

She was Allison & Busby's Editorial Director for 20 years, publishing many notable authors including Sam Greenlee (author of The Spook Who Sat by the Door, the first novel published by A & B, in 1969), C. L. R. James, Buchi Emecheta, Chester Himes, George Lamming, Roy Heath, Ishmael Reed, John Edgar Wideman, Nuruddin Farah, Rosa Guy, Val Wilmer, Colin MacInnes, H. Rap Brown, Julius Lester, Geoffrey Grigson, Edward Blishen, Dermot Healy, Adrian Mitchell, Matthew Sweeney, Jill Murphy, Christine Qunta, Michael Horovitz, Alexandra Kollontai, Gordon Williams, Alan Burns, Carlos Moore, Michèle Roberts, Molefe Pheto, Arthur Maimane, Maurice Nyagumbo, Giles Gordon, Claire Rayner, Clive Sinclair, Mineke Schipper, Chris Searle, Richard Stark, James Ellroy, Hunter S. Thompson, Margaret Thomson Davis, B. Traven, Alexis Lykiard, Tom Mallin, Jack Trevor Story, Michael Moorcock, Mervyn Peake, John Clute, Julian Savarin, Ralph de Boissière, Andrew Salkey, Harriet E. Wilson, and Miyamoto Musashi.

Busby was subsequently editorial director of Earthscan (publishing titles by Han Suyin, Frantz Fanon, Albert Memmi, René Dumont, Carolina Maria de Jesus, and others), before pursuing a freelance career as an editor, writer, and critic, from the early 1990s.

== Writing, editing and broadcasting ==
As a journalist, she has written for The Guardian (mainly book reviews or obituaries of artists and activists including Jessica Huntley, Buzz Johnson, Jayne Cortez, Jan Carew, Rosa Guy, Gwendolyn Brooks, June Jordan, Toni Cade Bambara, Florynce Kennedy, Barry Reckord, Frank Crichlow, Connie Mark, Glenn Thompson, August Wilson, Pearl Connor-Mogotsi, Geraldine Connor, Binyavanga Wainaina, bell hooks and Biyi Bandele), The Observer, The Independent, The Sunday Times, the New Statesman, and elsewhere, for both the general press and specialist journals.

=== Part of the Story: Writings from Half a Century (2026) ===
In March 2026, Hamish Hamilton published a collection of Busby's collected writings, titled Part of the Story: Writings from Half a Century.

=== Daughters of Africa (1992) and New Daughters of Africa (2019) ===
Busby compiled Daughters of Africa: An International Anthology of Words and Writings by Women of African Descent from the Ancient Egyptian to the Present (London: Cape, 1992), described by Black Enterprise as "a landmark", which includes contributions in a range of genres by more than 200 women. Widely reviewed on publication, it is now characterised as containing work by "the matriarchs of African literature. They pioneered 'African' writing, in which they were not simply writing stories about their families, communities and countries, but they were also writing themselves into the African literary history and African historiography. They claimed space for women storytellers in the written form, and in some sense reclaimed the woman's role as the creator and carrier of many African societies' narratives, considering that the traditional storytelling session was a women's domain."

Busby edited a 2019 follow-up volume entitled New Daughters of Africa: An International Anthology of Writing by Women of African Descent (first published by Myriad Editions in the UK), featuring another 200-plus writers from across the African diaspora. A reviewer in The Irish Times commented: "Sometimes you need an anthology to remind you of the variety, strength and nuance of writing among a certain region or group of people. New Daughters of Africa is indispensable because African voices have been silenced or diminished throughout history, and women's voices even more so."

Connected with the 2019 anthology, the "Margaret Busby New Daughters of Africa Award" was announced by the publisher, in partnership with SOAS, University of London, to benefit an African woman student, covering tuition fees and accommodation at International Students House, London. The first recipient of the award was Kenyan student Idza Luhumyo, who began her course in autumn 2020, and went on to win the 2022 Caine Prize for African Writing.

=== Other literary work ===
Busby has contributed to books including Colours of a New Day: Writing for South Africa (eds Sarah LeFanu and Stephen Hayward, 1990), Mothers: Reflections by Daughters (ed. Joanna Goldsworthy, 1995), IC3: The Penguin Book of New Black Writing in Britain (eds Kadija Sesay and Courttia Newland, 2000), Why 2K? Anthology for a New Era (2000), The Legacy of Efua Sutherland (2007), Essays in Honour of Ama Ata Aidoo at 70 (2012), 99 words (ed. Liz Gray, 2011), Black British Perspectives: A Series of Conversations on Black Art Forms (ed. Kadija Sesay, 2011), James Barnor: Ever Young (2015), If I Could Tell You Just One Thing...: Encounters with Remarkable People and Their Most Valuable Advice (by Richard Reed, 2016), Slay in Your Lane: The Black Girl Bible (by Elizabeth Uviebinené and Yomi Adegoke, 2018), and Chris Fite-Wassilak's The Artist in Time (July 2020).

In 2014, Busby co-authored with Ishmahil Blagrove Carnival: A Photographic and Testimonial History of the Notting Hill Carnival. Among other books for which she has written introductions or forewords are the Penguin Modern Classics edition of A Question of Power by Bessie Head, Emerging Perspectives on Buchi Emecheta (ed. Marie Umeh, 1996), Beyond Words: South African Poetics (with Keorapetse Kgositsile, Don Mattera, Lebo Mashile and Phillippa Yaa de Villiers, 2009), and To Sweeten Bitter (2017) by Raymond Antrobus. With Darcus Howe, Busby co-edited C.L.R. James's 80th Birthday Lectures (Race Today Publications, 1984), and she is co-editor with Beverley Mason FRSA of No Colour Bar: Black British Art in Action 1960–1990, a 2018 publication arising out of the 2015–16 exhibition No Colour Bar held at the Guildhall Art Gallery. The 2023 volume Empire Windrush: Reflections on 75 Years & More of the Black British Experience, edited by Onyekachi Wambu, includes a Preface by Busby, as does Blazing Trails (2023) by Gus John.

Busby was a prominent participant in the major 2019 exhibition Get Up, Stand Up Now: Generations of Black Creative Pioneers at Somerset House, and contributed an introductory essay for the catalogue, as well as taking part in associated events. In 2024, she also contributed an introductory essay to the catalogue for the exhibition Inner Worlds, Outer Journeys - Ablade Glover At 90 (October Gallery, London).

Busby is the editor of Firespitter: The Collected Poems of Jayne Cortez (Nightboat Books, 2025), for which she wrote an introduction.

=== Broadcasting and dramatisations ===
Busby has regularly worked for radio and television since the late 1960s, when she presented the magazine programme London Line for the Central Office of Information, as well as Break For Women on the BBC African Service, and later Talking Africa on Spectrum Radio, in addition to appearing on a range of programmes including Kaleidoscope, Front Row, Open Book, Woman's Hour, and Democracy Now! (USA).

Her abridgements and dramatisations for BBC Radio include books by C. L. R. James, Jean Rhys, Wole Soyinka, Timothy Mo, Sam Selvon, Walter Mosley, Henry Louis Gates, Lawrence Scott and Simi Bedford. Busby's play based on C. L. R. James's novel Minty Alley, and produced by Pam Fraser Solomon, was first broadcast on BBC Radio 4 in 1998, winning a Commission for Racial Equality "Race in the Media Award" (RIMA) in 1999. In October 2003, BBC Radio 4's Woman's Hour broadcast Busby's five-part serial Yaa Asantewaa, also directed by Fraser Solomon.

Busby was a member of Penumbra Productions, an independent production company, with other members including Horace Ové, H. O. Nazareth, Farrukh Dhondy, Mustapha Matura, Michael Abbensetts and Lindsay Barrett, among whose projects was a series of films based on lectures by C. L. R. James in the 1980s.

Her writing for the stage includes Sankofa (1999), Yaa Asantewaa – Warrior Queen (UK/Ghana, 2001–02), directed by Geraldine Connor, and An African Cargo (about the Zong massacre), directed by Felix Cross for Nitrobeat and staged at Greenwich Theatre in 2007, among events marking the bicentenary of the Slave Trade Act 1807. Her work as a dramatist has been characterised as "aim[ing] to recuperate events and people marginalized by Western historiography, to centre indigenous African performance traditions, and to highlight African heroism (Yaa Asantewa) and African suffering at the hands of whites (An African Cargo)."

Busby has also been a song lyricist, acknowledged by singer Norma Winstone.

In 2014, following the death of Maya Angelou, Busby scripted a major tribute entitled Maya Angelou: A Celebration, which took place on 5 October at the Royal Festival Hall during the Southbank Centre's London Literature Festival; directed by Paulette Randall, and chaired by Jon Snow and Moira Stuart, the celebration featured contributions from artists including Adjoa Andoh, Angel Coulby, Chiwetel Ejiofor, Nicola Hughes, Ella Odedina, NITROvox, Roderick Williams and Ayanna Witter-Johnson.

In June 2021, Busby appeared on BBC Radio 4's Desert Island Discs, with her choices of music including "7 Seconds" by Youssou N'Dour and Neneh Cherry, David Rudder's "Haiti I Am Sorry", "My Baby Just Cares for Me" by Nina Simone, "On the Sunny Side of the Street" by Dizzy Gillespie, Sonny Rollins and Sonny Stitt, "Soweto Blues" by Miriam Makeba and "Visions" by Stevie Wonder.

== Literary activism ==
She has worked continuously for diversity within the publishing industry, writing in a 1984 article in the New Statesman: "Is it enough to respond to a demand for books reflecting the presence of 'ethnic minorities' while perpetuating a system which does not actively encourage their involvement at all levels? The reality is that the appearance and circulation of books supposedly produced with these communities in mind is usually dependent on what the dominant white (male) community, which controls schools, libraries, bookshops and publishing houses, will permit." In the 1980s, she was a founding member of the organization Greater Access to Publishing (GAP), which engaged in campaigns for increased Black representation in British publishing. Other members of this multi-racial group, which held a conference in November 1987 particularly to highlight publishing as an option for Black women, included Lennie Goodings, Maggie Scott, Ros de Lanerolle, Yvonne Collymore, Paula Kahn, Toks Williams, Kothai Christie, and Jacqui Roach.

Busby was the patron of Independent Black Publishers (IBP), a trade association chaired by Verna Wilkins. The aim of IBP, as Busby was quoted as saying, was to "provide a forum for progressive black publishers to share initiatives, maximise mutual strengths and identify common difficulties, with a view to having a more effective impact on the book trade and the wider publishing industry", and in 2007 at the London Book Fair a joint IBP stand showcased the books of Bogle-L'Ouverture Press, Tamarind Books, the X Press, Ayebia Clarke Publishing, Joan Anim-Addo's Mango Publishing, and other ventures. In a 2012 interview with Tricia Wombell, Busby said: "It is important to document and celebrate the achievements of many of our Black creatives (…) so that they do not get written out of history simply because their importance may not be recognised by the mainstream."

In August 2010, at the University of the Western Cape, she delivered a lecture in memory of assassinated South African political activist Dulcie September (1935–1988).

Busby has been a participant in numerous literary festivals and conferences internationally – in 1993, she gave the opening address at the International Book Fair of Radical Black and Third World Books – and has interviewed and been "in conversation" with such noted writers as Toni Morrison, Maya Angelou, Ama Ata Aidoo, Wole Soyinka, Nawal El Saadawi, Ngugi wa Thiong'o. and Ben Okri.

Busby was appointed chair of the 2020 Booker Prize judges, other members of the panel including Lee Child, Sameer Rahim, Lemn Sissay, and Emily Wilson. Busby has previously judged several other literary competitions, among them the Caine Prize for African Writing, the Orange Prize, the Independent Foreign Fiction Prize, the Wasafiri New Writing Prize, the OCM Bocas Prize for Caribbean Literature, the Commonwealth Book Prize (for which she was chair of the judges in 2012, when the winner was Shehan Karunatilaka), the Hay Festival initiative Africa39, and the Wole Soyinka Prize for Literature in Africa (chair of judges, 2018). In 2021, she served as a judge in the Trade category of the British Book Awards, and in 2022 judged the PEN Pinter Prize alongside Ruth Borthwick and Daniel Hahn.

She has served on the boards or in advisory positions for other cultural organisations, including the Drum Arts Centre (co-founded in 1973 by Cy Grant), The Africa Centre, London, English PEN, the Royal Literary Fund, the African & Caribbean Music Circuit, the Hackney Empire theatre, the Organization of Women Writers of Africa, the Etisalat Prize for Literature (as patron, alongside Ama Ata Aidoo, Dele Olojede, Ellah Allfrey, Kole Omotoso and Zakes Mda), Nubian Jak Community Trust, and Wasafiri magazine. She is Prize Ambassador of the SI Leeds Literary Prize, and an inaugural patron (and former trustee) of jazz education charity Tomorrow's Warriors, founded in 1991. She is also a patron of Friends of the Huntley Archives at London Metropolitan Archives (FHALMA), a charitable foundation building on the archival legacy of Jessica Huntley and Eric Huntley, co-founders of the publishing house Bogle-L'Ouverture Publications.

In August 2022, Busby headlined the Berlin African Book Festival (curated by Lidudumalingani Mqombothi with the theme "Yesterday. Today. Tomorrow"), delivering the keynote address.

In March 2024, she gave the keynote address at opening of the Johannesburg Festival of Women Writers, founded by Barbara Masekela, and hosted by the Johannesburg Institute for Advanced Study at the University of Johannesburg, which was on the theme "Mothers and Daughters: An Intergenerational Conversation". In the same month, she also participated in the 27th Time of the Writer Festival in Durban, South Africa.

In July 2025, Busby gave the opening address to launch HOWL, the History of Women’s Liberation website, which aims to collect and publish the memories and stories of feminists involved in the UK Women's Liberation Movement.

== Influence and recognition ==
In 2018, in celebration of the 100th anniversary of women's right to vote, The Voice newspaper listed Margaret Busby – alongside Kathleen Wrasama, Olive Morris, Connie Mark, Fanny Eaton, Diane Abbott, Lilian Bader, and Mary Seacole – among eight Black women who have contributed to the development of Britain. Bustle magazine included Busby with Mary Prince, Claudia Jones, Evelyn Dove, Olive Morris, Olivette Otele, and Shirley Thompson on a list of "7 Black British Women Throughout History That Deserve To Be Household Names In 2019". Busby was also named by the Evening Standard on a list of 14 "Inspirational black British women throughout history" (alongside Mary Seacole, Claudia Jones, Adelaide Hall, Olive Morris, Joan Armatrading, Tessa Sanderson, Doreen Lawrence, Maggie Aderin-Pocock, Sharon White, Malorie Blackman, Diane Abbott, Zadie Smith and Connie Mark).

Also in 2018, she was among 150 "Leading Women" celebrated by the University of London to mark the 150 years since women gained access to higher education in the UK in 1868, and featured in the exhibition Rights for Women: London's Pioneers in their Own Words staged at Senate House Library from 16 July to 15 December 2018.

In July 2019, she was awarded the inaugural Africa Writes Lifetime Achievement Award, presented to her at the British Library during the Royal African Society's annual literary weekend by Ade Solanke and Diane Abbott as part of the festival headline event celebrating Busby's anthology New Daughters of Africa.

Busby is frequently cited as a pioneer in the history of Black publishers in the UK, and is acknowledged as a "pathfinder" by those who followed in her footsteps working towards making the books industry and its output more diverse, among them Bibi Bakare-Yusuf (who when speaking of founding Cassava Republic Press said: "Inspirational figures in publishing such as Margaret Busby, co-founder of Allison & Busby, were our guide"), Ellah Wakatama Allfrey, Valerie Brandes of Jacaranda Books, Sharmaine Lovegrove of Dialogue Books, and Aki Schilz of The Literary Consultancy.

In UK Black History Month 2019, Zadie Smith said that Busby "has been a cheerleader, instigator, organiser, defender and celebrator of black arts for the past 50 years, shouting about us from the rooftops, even back when few people cared to listen. 'We can because she did' is a cliché but in Margaret's case it is both true and no exaggeration. She helped change the landscape of both UK publishing and arts coverage and so many Black British artists owe her a debt. I know I do." Afua Hirsch described Busby's impact on her career by saying that "as a black woman trying to find my own voice, [Margaret] has been endlessly interested, supportive and enthusiastic about helping a generation like me find our place and our ability to make change through writing."

Busby was named on the 2020 list of 100 Great Black Britons, voted on by the public and with a scope of 400 years.

In May 2021, she was announced as the recipient of the London Book Fair Lifetime Achievement Award 2021, which was presented to her by Bernardine Evaristo in September at The Hurlingham Club.

Busby was appointed Commander of the Order of the British Empire (CBE) in the 2021 Birthday Honours for services to publishing. She was quoted in the Hackney Gazette as saying: "Well, I know I did not fall from the sky; whenever I am offered any such award, my accepting it is also on behalf of and to acknowledge everyone who made me what I am, and those whom I have worked with along the way - so I gladly share this recognition with many others who deserve equally to be honoured for contributing excellence in countless spheres of work."

She has been awarded a number of honorary degrees including from the Open University, SOAS, and from Royal Holloway, where the conferral took place in June 2021 with the oration being given by Professor Lavinia Greenlaw. In June 2022, Busby also received an honorary doctorate from the University of Exeter.

In April 2023, Busby was appointed president of English PEN, succeeding Philippe Sands in the role.

== Honours and awards ==
- 1970: Society of Young Publishers Award.
- 1977: Featured in Mayotte Magnus exhibition Women, photographs of eminent British women, at London's National Portrait Gallery, reprised in 2018 as Illuminating Women.
- 1993: Pandora Award from Women in Publishing.
- 1998: Honorary Member of Alpha Kappa Alpha (AKA) International Region.
- 1999: Race in the Media Award for radio play Minty Alley.
- 1999: Enstooled as Nana Akua Ackon, a Ghanaian chief, of Bentsir No. 1 Asafo company, Oguaa (Cape Coast) – the first of seven traditional warrior groups established to protect the area.
- 2004: Open University Honorary Doctorate for Services to the Arts and Sciences.
- 2004: Featured in "A Great Day in London" photograph at the British Library among 50 Black and Asian writers who have made major contributions to British literature.
- 2006: Officer of the Order of the British Empire, for services to Literature and to Publishing.
- 2011: Honorary Fellowship, Queen Mary, University of London.
- 2015: Henry Swanzy Award for Distinguished Service to Caribbean Letters, NGC Bocas Lit Fest, Trinidad.
- 2015: UK African Heritage High Achievers Recognition Award from the House of Amau.
- 2015: Honorary Membership of PAWA (Pan African Writers Association) Award, Ghana.
- 2017: Elected Honorary Fellow of the Royal Society of Literature.
- 2017: Awarded the Benson Medal by the Royal Society of Literature for lifelong achievement.
- 2017: Goldsmiths University of London event "Daughter of Africa: Celebrating Margaret Busby's 50 Years in Publishing and Beyond".
- 2018: Selected as one of University of London's 150 "Leading Women" to celebrate 150 years of women's higher education in the UK.
- 2019: Inaugural Africa Writes Lifetime Achievement Award from the Royal African Society.
- 2019: Honorary doctorate from SOAS, University of London.
- 2020: Honorary degree from Royal Holloway, University of London.
- 2020: Voted one of "100 Great Black Britons".
- 2021: London Book Fair Lifetime Achievement Award.
- 2021: Commander of the Order of the British Empire, for services to publishing.
- 2022: Honorary degree (DLitt) from the University of Exeter.
- 2023: Honorary Doctor of Letters from Oxford Brookes University
- 2023: GUBA Awards – "Woman of Spirit Award"
- 2025: Honorary doctorate from the University of Johannesburg "for her dedication to critical African scholarship and publishing".

== See also ==
- Jessica Huntley
- John La Rose
