= Lilian Bader =

British Women's Auxiliary Air Force member (1918–2015)

- Born: Lilian Bailey; 18 February 1918; Liverpool, England
- Died: 13 March 2015 (aged 97)
- Education: BA University of London
- Spouse: Ramsay Bader (m. 1943)
- Children: 2

Lilian Bader (née Bailey; 18 February 1918 – 14 March 2015) was one of the first mixed-race women to join the British armed forces.

== Early life ==
Lilian Bader was born at 19 Upper Stanhope Street in the Toxteth area of Liverpool to Marcus Bailey, a merchant seaman from Barbados who served in the First World War, and a British-born mother of Irish parentage.

In 1927, Bader and her two brothers were orphaned when their father died. At the age of 9 she was separated from her brothers and placed in a convent, where she remained until she was 20.^{:176} Bader has explained that it was difficult to find employment 'because of her father's origins: "My casting out from the convent walls was delayed. I was half West Indian, and nobody, not even the priests, dare risk ridicule by employing me."'^{:79}

== Second World War ==
In 1939, at the onset of the Second World War, Bader enlisted in the Navy, Army and Air Force Institutes (NAAFI) at Catterick Camp, Yorkshire. She was dismissed after seven weeks when it was discovered that her father was not born in the United Kingdom.^{:177}

On 28 March 1941, she enlisted in the Women's Auxiliary Air Force (WAAF), after she heard that the Royal Air Force (RAF) were taking citizens of West Indian descent.^{:177} She trained in instrument repair, which was a trade newly opened to women. She then became a leading aircraft woman and was eventually promoted to the rank of corporal.^{:177}

In 1943, she married Ramsay Bader, a tank driver who served in the 147th (Essex Yeomanry) Field Regiment, Royal Artillery. She was given compassionate discharge from her position in February 1944, when she became pregnant with her first child.^{,}^{:218} Ultimately, they had two sons together, Geoffrey and Adrian.^{:177}

== Postwar life ==
After the war, Bader and her husband moved to Northamptonshire to raise their family. Bader studied for O-Levels and A-levels in evening classes in the 1960s, then studied at London University where she received a Bachelor of Arts degree. Following this she had a career as a teacher.^{:218}

== Legacy ==
In 2018, in celebration of the 100th anniversary of women's right to vote, The Voice newspaper listed Bader – alongside Kathleen Wrasama, Olive Morris, Connie Mark, Fanny Eaton, Diane Abbott, Margaret Busby, and Mary Seacole – among eight Black women who have contributed to the development of Britain. In October 2020, Bader was commemorated by the publication of an entry in the Oxford Dictionary of National Biography. Cathy Tyson directed and acted in a short film, Lilian (2022).
