= Château de Boussan =

Ruined castle in Occitania, France

Coordinates: 43°14′25″N 0°53′25″E

The Château de Boussan is a ruined castle in the commune of Boussan in the Haute-Garonne département of France.

The castle was constructed on a rocky outcrop dominating the valley of the Louge. It was abandoned in 1553. The only remaining part is a square tower with the top removed, attached to the wall of a residential building, a ditch, and the remains of the church, itself in use later and abandoned in 1740.

Property of the commune, it has been listed as a monument historique by the French Ministry of Culture since 1926.

== See also ==
- List of castles in France
