= Durham County Cricket League =

The Durham County Cricket League was a league operating in County Durham in the North East of England. The league was originally formed in 1937 but only lasted two seasons before it disbanded. The league reformed in 1948 with the first champions being Peases West Welfare CC, who were based in Crook. 17 different clubs won the league over its 64 seasons. Crook Town CC were the most successful club with 12 league titles to their credit followed by Esh Winning CC with 7 wins, Kimblesworth CC with 6 and Dean and Chapter CW CC, Ushaw Moor CC and Evenwood CC with 5 titles each.

The league disbanded at the end of the 2012 season and merged with the Durham Senior League and Durham Coast League to form the Durham Cricket League after each of the three leagues lost clubs to the enlarged North East Premier League.

== List of league champions ==
- 1948 - Peases West Welfare
- 1949 - Dean and Chapter CW
- 1950 - Seaham Park
- 1951 - Crook Town
- 1952 - Langley Park CW
- 1953 - Murton CW
- 1954 - Murton CW
- 1955 - Seaham Park
- 1956 - Murton CW
- 1957 - Hetton Lyons
- 1958 - Dean and Chapter CW
- 1959 - Dean and Chapter CW
- 1960 - Dean and Chapter CW
- 1961 - Dean and Chapter CW
- 1962 - Shildon BR
- 1963 - Crook Town
- 1964 - Crook Town
- 1965 - Ushaw Moor
- 1966 - Shildon BR
- 1967 - Ushaw Moor
- 1968 - Ushaw Moor
- 1969 - Ushaw Moor
- 1970 - Ushaw Moor
- 1971 - Shildon BR
- 1972 - Etherley
- 1973 - Ushaw Moor
- 1974 - Crook Town
- 1975 - Willington
- 1976 - Langley Park
- 1977 - Evenwood
- 1978 - Langley Park
- 1979 - Evenwood
- 1980 - Crook Town
- 1981 - Crook Town
- 1982 - Crook Town
- 1983 - Crook Town
- 1984 - Leadgate
- 1985 - Esh Winning
- 1986 - Crook Town
- 1987 - Crook Town
- 1988 - Tudhoe
- 1989 - Esh Winning
- 1990 - Esh Winning
- 1991 - Crook Town
- 1992 - Crook Town
- 1993 - Sedgefield
- 1994 - Kimblesworth
- 1995 - Tudhoe
- 1996 - Tudhoe
- 1997 - Hetton Lyons
- 1998 - Tudhoe
- 1999 - Leadgate
- 2000 - Leadgate
- 2001 - Kimblesworth
- 2002 - Evenwood
- 2003 - Evenwood
- 2004 - Evenwood
- 2005 - Esh Winning
- 2006 - Kimblesworth
- 2007 - Esh Winning
- 2008 - Kimblesworth
- 2009 - Kimblesworth
- 2010 - Kimblesworth
- 2011 - Esh Winning
- 2012 - Esh Winning
