= Boussan =

- Commune
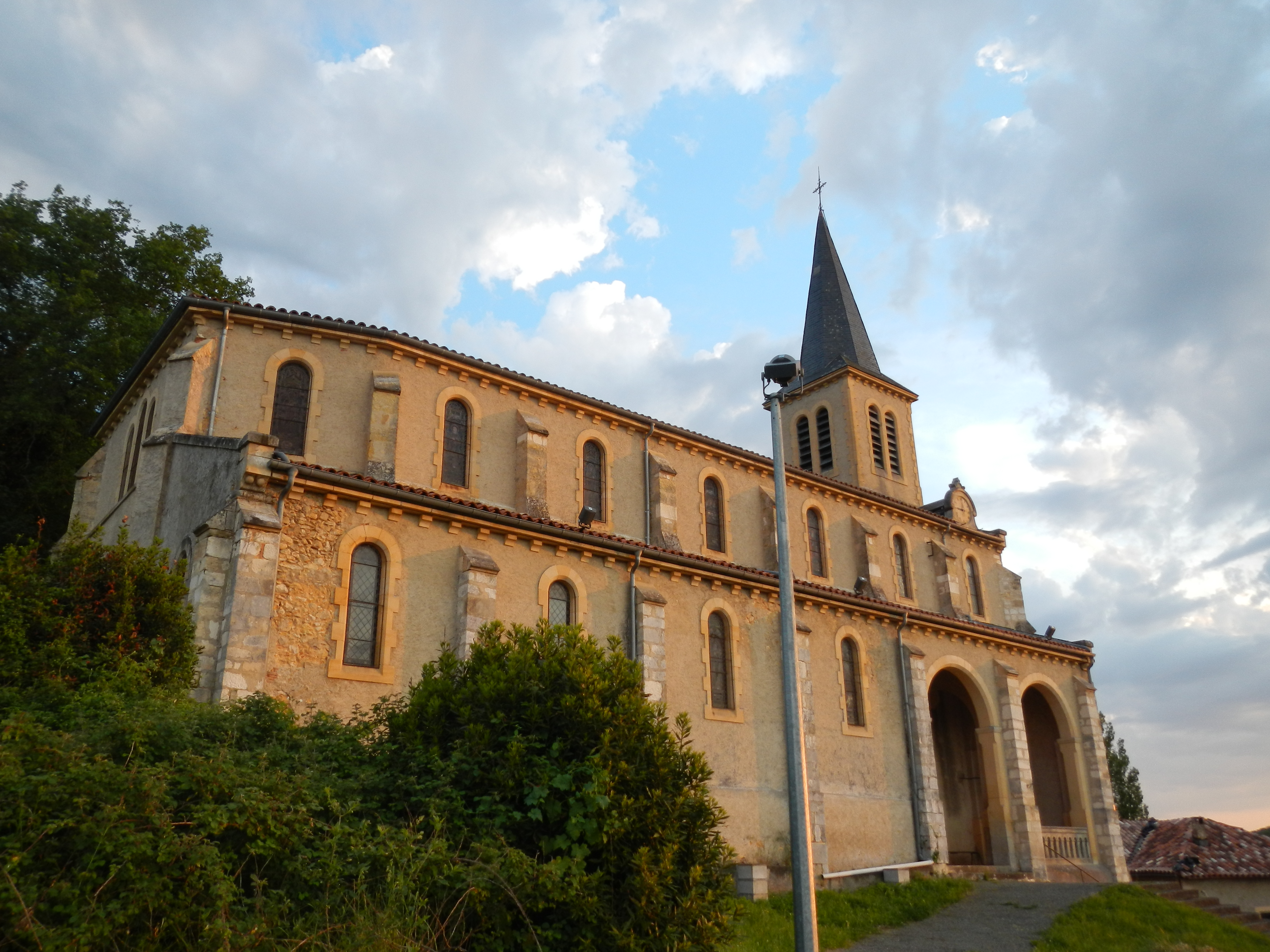
- The church in Boussan
- Location of Boussan
- Location within France Location within Occitanie
- Coordinates: 43°14′41″N 0°53′21″E
- Country: France
- Region: Occitania
- Department: Haute-Garonne
- Arrondissement: Saint-Gaudens
- Canton: Cazères
- Intercommunality: Cœur et Coteaux du Comminges

Government
  - Mayor (2020–2026): Patrick Boube
- Area^{1}: 12.45 km^{2} (4.81 sq mi)
- Highest elevation: 466 m (1,529 ft)
- Lowest elevation: 280 m (920 ft)
- Population (2023): 227
  - Density: 18.2/km^{2} (47.2/sq mi)
- Time zone: UTC+01:00 (CET)
  - Summer (DST): UTC+02:00 (CEST)
- INSEE/Postal code: 31083 /31420
- ^{1} French Land Register data, which excludes lakes, ponds, glaciers > 1 km^{2} (0.386 sq mi or 247 acres) and river estuaries.

Boussan (French pronunciation: [busɑ̃]; Occitan: Boçan) is a commune in the Haute-Garonne department in southwestern France.

== Population ==
Historical population
| Year | Pop. | ±% p.a. |
|---|---|---|
| 1968 | 258 | — |
| 1975 | 234 | −1.39% |
| 1982 | 225 | −0.56% |
| 1990 | 211 | −0.80% |
| 1999 | 190 | −1.16% |
| 2007 | 204 | +0.89% |
| 2012 | 230 | +2.43% |
| 2017 | 239 | +0.77% |
| 2023 | 227 | −0.85% |
Source: INSEE

== See also ==
- Château de Boussan
- Communes of the Haute-Garonne department
