= Ken Barrington =

English cricketer (1930–1981)

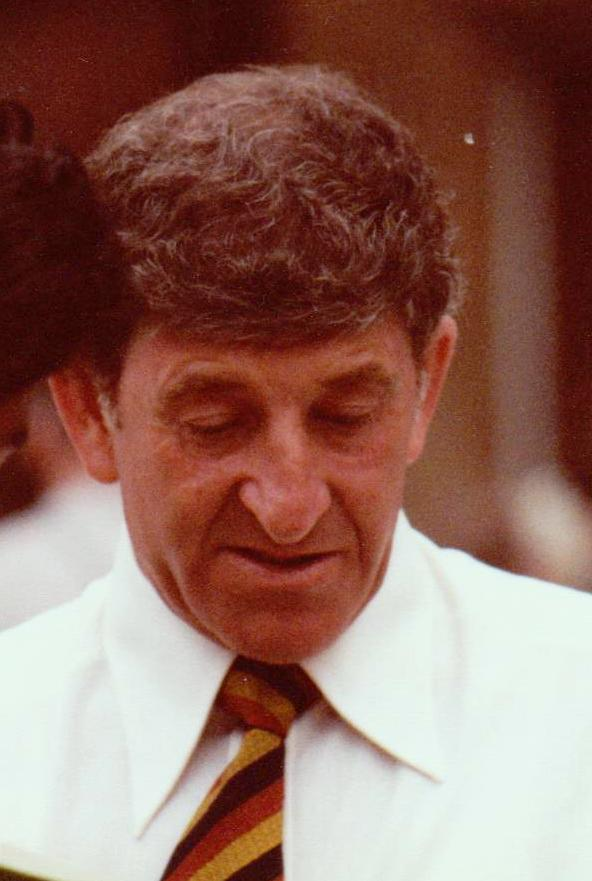

Personal information
- Full name: Kenneth Frank Barrington
- Born: 24 November 1930; Reading, Berkshire, England
- Died: 14 March 1981 (aged 50); Saint Michael, Barbados
- Height: 5 ft 9 in (1.75 m)
- Batting: Right-handed
- Bowling: Right-arm leg break
- Role: Batsman

International information
- National side: England
- Test debut (cap 380): 9 June 1955 v South Africa
- Last Test: 30 July 1968 v Australia

Domestic team information
- Years: Team
- 1953–1968: Surrey

Career statistics
Competition	Test	FC	LA
Matches	82	533	14
Runs scored	6,806	31,714	399
Batting average	58.67	45.63	33.25
100s/50s	20/35	76/171	0/3
Top score	256	256	70*
Balls bowled	2,715	17,924	108
Wickets	29	273	4
Bowling average	44.82	32.61	33.33
5 wickets in innings	0	8	0
10 wickets in match	0	0	0
Best bowling	3/4	7/40	3/41
Catches/stumpings	58/–	514/–	5/–
- Source: CricketArchive, 18 July 2009

Kenneth Frank Barrington (24 November 1930 – 14 March 1981), was an English international cricketer who played for the England cricket team and Surrey County Cricket Club in the 1950s and 1960s. He was a right-handed batsman and occasional leg-spin bowler, known for his jovial good humour and long, defensive innings "batting with bulldog determination and awesome concentration". He is widely regarded as one of the best English batsmen of all time.

His batting improved with the quality of the opposition; he averaged 39.87 in the County Championship, 45.63 in first-class cricket, 58.67 in Test cricket and 63.96 against Australia. Of players with a completed career, only Don Bradman with his average of 99.94 made more than Barrington's 6,806 Test runs at a higher average, which is the seventh highest of batsmen who have made 1,000 Test runs, and the highest by a post-war England batsman. His 256 in the Fourth Test at Old Trafford in 1964 is the third highest score for England against Australia and the highest since the Second World War. Barrington twice made centuries in four successive Tests, and was the first England batsmen to make hundreds on all six traditional Test grounds: Old Trafford, Edgbaston, Headingley, Lord's, Trent Bridge and The Oval.

His test career ended when he had a heart attack in Australia in 1968, even though he had several potentially fruitful years ahead of him. From 1975 to 1981 he was an England selector and a regular tour manager. He died from a second heart attack on 14 March 1981 during the Third Test at Bridgetown, Barbados, where he had made his maiden Test century 21 years earlier.

== Early life ==
=== Family ===
Ken Barrington was the eldest child of Percy and Winifred Barrington and had two brothers, Roy and Colin, and a sister, Sheila. His father was a career soldier who served in the British Army for 28 years, 24 of them in the Royal Berkshire Regiment. Despite winning a row of medals for service around the world including the First World War Percy Barrington remained a private and when Ken was born was a batman in the officer's mess at Brock Barracks in Reading, Berkshire. His children grew up in the barracks and led a rather spartan life during the Great Depression of the 1930s. Percy remained at Brock Barracks in the Second World War, left the Army in 1947 and took up work as a watchman for Handley Page. When Ken became a professional cricketer he often gave his family tickets for the Oval so they could see him play.

=== Boyhood cricket ===
Percy Barrington was a keen cricketer, played for the regimental cricket team as an all-rounder and taught all his children how to play, using a piece of wood as a cricket bat. Ken attended Wilson Central primary school. When he moved to Katesgrove Secondary school at the age of 11 he joined the school cricket team, as a batsman and fast bowler. In one early game he opened the bowling with Ray Reeves (who later played football for Reading F.C.) and dismissed the opposition for 10 runs in 15 minutes. In 1945 Barrington left school aged 14 and took up work as a motor mechanic in Reading, Fred Titmus saying "he could drive anything from a tank to a scooter".

After a year he joined Reading Cricket Club as the assistant groundsman, a job that allowed him unlimited opportunity to practice cricket. It is here that he learned the art of leg-spin. His old boss told him "You will never make a living in cricket". Barrington played for the White Hart Hotel XI on Sundays and the Reading Wednesday XI where he was spotted by the ex-England and Surrey batsman Andy Sandham. Sandham invited him to play for the Surrey Colts at the age of 16. Barrington took 5/43 and made 4 not out in his first game and became a regular player in their Saturday cricket matches. Here he came under the tutorage of Andrew Kempton, a friend of Sir Jack Hobbs. He took 30 wickets at an average of 13, but batted down the order.

=== Surrey groundstaff ===
In August 1947, Barrington was asked to join the groundstaff of the prestigious Surrey County Cricket Club at the Kennington Oval in South London for the following season. From April 1948, he commuted to London by railway for his training, having yet to see a first-class cricket match. The Chief Coach was Andy Sandham who thought his leg-spin bowling lacked accuracy (Surrey had Jim Laker and Tony Lock so did not need another spinner) and made him concentrate on his batting. Alec Bedser predicted that Barrington was a future Test player and Sandham later stated that Barrington was his best pupil. He worked on preparing the vast Oval ground for first-class cricket and played for the Surrey Club and Ground cricket team, though still down the order. In the 1949 season he only had time to play one game, making 52 against Kew, before he was called up for National Service.

=== National Service ===
Barrington served as a Lance-Corporal in the Wiltshire Regiment stationed in Germany. He grew from 5 ft 4 in (1.63 m) to 5 ft 9 in (1.75 m) during this time and he was encouraged to pursue sports. Apart from cricket, he represented his battalion at football, won the battalion boxing championship and a small arms competition at the Mons Officer Cadet School. His leg-spin was helped by the matting wickets used by the British Army cricket team. As he was the only NCO in the team, when they played the officers travelled in staff cars and Barrington by himself in an army truck. Barrington had strong army connections and remained in the Territorial Army after his National Service ended in 1950.

== Early career 1950–58 ==
=== Surrey 1950–54 ===
On his discharge in August 1950 Barrington returned to Surrey and professional coaching. In May 1951 he made his first century batting against Kenley at number seven and was promoted to the top order. In July he added 64 and 194 not out against the Surrey Colts and Barrington started to play for the Surrey Second XI – a minor county team. In 1952 he became a star batsman, making 1,097 runs at 57.73 including 157 not out and 151 in successive games against Devon County Cricket Club and was mentioned in Wisden.

Stuart Surridge became captain of Surrey in 1952 and led them to their first of a record seven successive County Championships. (They had shared the trophy with Middlesex in 1950). In 1953 Barrington joined this formidable Surrey team including Alec and Eric Bedser, Peter May, Jim Laker, Tony Lock, Peter Loader and Arthur McIntyre. Their bowling line up was of Test class and it was for his growing batting skills that the young Barrington was called up. He made his first-class cricket debut against the Marylebone Cricket Club (MCC) in their traditional match against the champions at Lord's at the start of the cricket season. Barrington batted at number six and was stumped by Godfrey Evans off Alan Oakman for 7 in the first innings and caught off Oakman for 17 in the second as Surrey lost a low scoring match by 107 runs. His second match began the next day against the 1953 Australians and he was dismissed by Ken Archer (11/61) for 10 and 4 in another defeat, this time by an innings and 76 runs. Richie Benaud recalled that he was a very correct batsman, but Barrington was returned to the Second XI.

He played only a few games in the County Championship and top-scored with 81 against Worcestershire. Surrey won without his help in 1953, but in July 1954 they were in severe trouble, in eighth place and 46 points behind the leaders Yorkshire. After a few fifties Barrington made his maiden first-class century against Gloucestershire at the Oval. Surrey were 149/7 when he was joined by Jim Laker in a partnership of 198, Barrington 108 not out and Laker 113. In the second innings he came in at 39/4 made 68 and Surrey won by 145 runs. Surrey won 10 of their next 12 games and the Championship. Barrington made 89 against Essex in a game where nobody else passed 50 and 102 against the Pakistanis. The arrival of Barrington and Mickey Stewart was seen as the turning point in Surrey's fortunes and E.M. Wellings wrote that he was the best young batting prospect since Denis Compton, adding "He is a brilliant strokemaker and now has such a sound defence that he is as convincing on the wet wickets as on the dry.

=== Marriage ===
Ken Barrington met his future wife Ann Cozens at a dance in Reading in 1952. She was a secretary for the local Education Department, taught at Sunday School and played netball. He proposed to her on a train to Reading and her father agreed to the marriage if they saved £500. As a result, they married on 6 March 1954 and honeymooned in Devon until Ken was called up for the Territorial Army at Salisbury. They remained happily married for 27 years until his death. As first-class cricketers rarely had employment in the winter Barrington worked for British Rail (painting Oxford station), a firm of solicitors and at a job selling perfumes and carpets. They first lived with Ann's parents, but in 1956 bought their own house in Mitcham in Surrey near the Oval, where he found work nearby with a firm of accountants and Ann at a travel agents.

=== South Africa 1955 ===
If he should not do conspicuously well and the established players become available, he is almost bound, temporarily at least, to join the very long list of youthful cricketers prematurely tried for England and promptly discarded.
– E. W. Swanton

In 1955 Surrey won their first 9 matches and Surridge's vice-captain Peter May succeeded Len Hutton as captain of England. Barrington made 135 not out against Lancashire and 126 against Nottinghamshire, which won him his county cap. Now established in the Surrey team he was called up for the First Test against South Africa at Trent Bridge, hearing the news when a crowd cheered him while batting in a charity match. He batted at number 4, replacing Colin Cowdrey who was unable to play. Barrington made a duck and though England won by an innings he felt isolated from the England regulars who he barely knew. He was kept in the side for the Second Test at Lord's, coming in at 30/3 in the first innings and making 34, top-scoring in England's 133, but looked uncomfortable on a green pitch against the fast bowling of Peter Heine. In the second innings Barrington and Denis Compton added 40 runs, but he was out for 18. Even though England won, Cowdrey was now available and so Barrington was dropped. Returning to Surrey he made 73 out of 171 against Middlesex after coming in at 6/4 and helped the County to their fourth successive Championship. He was voted "Young Cricketer of the Year" by the Cricket Writers Club and was chosen for the 1955–56 Marylebone Cricket Club (MCC) tour of Pakistan.

=== Pakistan 1955–56 ===
The Marylebone Cricket Club (MCC) tour of Pakistan had the dual purpose of spreading cricketing goodwill and providing employment and experience for young players with Test potential. There were no Test matches, but they did play Pakistan as the MCC. The team was managed by the genial Geoffrey Howard, the Secretary of Lancashire and captained by Donald Carr, the captain of Derbyshire and included Fred Titmus, Brian Close, Tony Lock, Jim Parks and Peter Richardson. Barrington made 70 not out in the first match against Karachi and 66 in the second against Sind. The first match between Pakistan and the MCC at Lahore was a dull draw, followed by two wins for Pakistan and a close victory for the MCC by two wickets in the fourth and final game. Barrington made 10 and 52, 43 and 11, 32 and 0 and 76 and 10 in these matches, the 43 taking 4 hours against the bowling of Fazal Mahmood.

With five other members of the team he 'kidnapped' Idris Begh the Karachi umpire whose decisions they thought were heavily biased. They poured a bucket of water over him in their apartments and he was laughed at by them and two members of the Pakistani team who happened to witness the event. Begh complained to the Pakistani captain Abdul Kardar and the matter became public, with the crowd chanting "Go home MCC" on the last day of the game. The President of the MCC Lord Alexander offered to recall the tour and the press called for the culprits to be barred from international cricket, but Howard managed to smooth things down and the tour was completed. In a public relations exercise the MCC played football with the Pakistan Air Force with Barrington in goal. Even though Barrington came second in the first-class averages with 586 runs (39.0) – Richardson came first with 650 runs (43.44) – Carr did not return a favourable report and it would be four years before Barrington would tour again.

=== Surrey 1956–58 ===
The Australians were touring again in 1956 and when Len Maddocks saw Barrington he told Keith Miller "This fellow looks the part; he might give us some trouble before long". England had a strong team and under Peter May's leadership they beat Australia 2–1, the West Indies 3–0 in 1957 and New Zealand 4–0 in 1958. Barrington lost his form in these seasons and could not fight his way back into the England team. Stuart Surridge retired after winning five championships in his five years as captain and in 1956 May took over, winning Surrey's sixth consecutive championship in 1957 with a massive 94-point lead. In one area Barrington showed improvement as with Surridge gone Surrey needed another close fielder and he was made first slip. He took 64 catches in his first season in this position and as Mickey Stewart held 77 catches and Tony Lock 63 Surrey more than held onto their chances.

In June 1957 Barrington's batting picked up with 12 fours and 4 sixes in his 124 not out against Gloucestershire and 103 not out against the West Indies including their famous spinners Sonny Ramadhin and Alf Valentine. Towards the end of the season Barrington could afford to relax and he hit three more hundreds. With no tour in sight Alf Gover offered Ken and Ann the chance to teach cricket in South Africa over the winter. They rented out their house in London, moved to Cape Town and he coached the First and Second XIs at the Roman Catholic St Joseph's College, set up an under-11 side in his free time and met a talented Cape Coloured cricketer called Basil d'Oliveira.

Back at the Oval Barrington had another poor season making only one century and was even dropped from the Surrey team and given the task of transporting the team kit from venue to venue. As a result, he re-worked his batting technique to get behind the ball to improve his defence against in-swing and off-spin. This was coupled with a change of attitude encouraged by Alec Bedser and Jim Laker; he forsook the big hitting of his youth and became a stonewaller, making runs with the minimum of risk. This required endless net-practice and training at Gover's cricket school, but by 1958 Barrington emerged as one of the best batsmen in England.

== Under Peter May 1959–61 ==
=== India 1959 ===
An earlier attempt to turn Barrington into an opener had failed, but McIntyre promoted him to number 3 in the order to stop him getting nervous while pacing around the dressing room waiting to bat. He made 97 against Cambridge University soon followed by 186 and 118 not out against Warwickshire at Edgbaston; 85 and 59 not out against the Indians at the Oval and 113 not out against Nottinghamshire at Trent Bridge.

This earned him a recall to the England cricket team against a weak Indian side, perfect for playing a batsman into a Test career. In the First Test at Trent Bridge he joined his Surrey and England captain Peter May at 63/3 and was told not to worry about scoring as long as he fought it out. Barrington took 20 minutes to get off the mark, but hit two sixes off Chandu Borde to bring up his 50 and was out for 56 in a stand of 175 as England won by an innings. In the Second Test at Lord's England were 100/7 when Barrington top-scored with 80; England adding 126 for the last three wickets to set up another big win. The Third Test at Headingley saw him making 80 again, this time adding 193 runs in a stand with Colin Cowdrey in an 8 wicket victory. The Fourth Test at Old Trafford gave him 87, and captain Colin Cowdrey gave him the ball and he took 3/36 with his leg-spin. In the second innings he was told to go for quick runs and hit 46 in 36 minutes with 6 fours and a six, then wrapped things up with 2/75 and a catch as England won by 171 runs.

Back home at the Oval for the Fifth Test Barrington was out for 8, but England completed the 5–0 whitewash with an innings victory. Barrington made 357 runs (59.50) in the series – more than anybody else – and had had his most prolific summer with 2,499 first-class runs (54.32), but Surrey failed to win the County Championship for the first time in 8 years, coming third. His consistent run-making won him the honour of being named one of the five Wisden Cricketers of the Year and he was an automatic choice for the forthcoming tour of the West Indies in 1959–60.

=== The West Indies 1959–60 ===
England had won the 1957 Series 3–0 and had high hopes that they would win again in the West Indies in 1959–60. Surrey had their own tour to Rhodesia, where Barrington made 111 in their 2 run defeat. The England team crossed the Atlantic in a banana boat and were promptly defeated by Barbados even though Barrington made 79 in each innings.

The West Indian fast bowlers Wes Hall and Chester Watson were rightly feared, but on a true pitch at the Kensington Oval in the First Test they could be played and coming in at number 3 Barrington made his maiden Test century – 128 in England's 482. He was stuck on 97 before driving Reg Scarlett to the boundary and was hit in the kidney by a bouncer from Watson. He was given out caught by Gerry Alexander off Sonny Ramadhin, but hesitated to walk after the umpire's decision and was made to apologise by the MCC manager Walter Robins. In what were to become familiar figures Barrington's century took 340 minutes to compile, but he struck 20 fours.

The Second Test took place at the Queen's Park Oval which had 'pace like fire' and Hall and Watson bounced the England batsmen. Barrington saw off their attack and added 132 with Ted Dexter, but was hit on the head by a Wes Hall bouncer on 87. He finished the last few minutes of play, but said "This is a fine – way to play cricket. If these bowlers don't watch out they're going to kill someone", which led to another reprimand from Robins. Praised for his courage by the British press Barrington made his second successive century before he was caught by Alexander off Hall for 121 in 340 minutes, the highest score of the match. Barrington hit 49 in the second innings and took 2/34 to dismiss Singh and Watson to wrap up England's 256 run victory.

The last three Tests were drawn, but not without incident; Wisden wrote "as the tour progressed he took more knocks than most from the bowlers. Nobody relished the short-pitched bowling, but Barrington showed his dislike more than most and as a result became a special target. Nevertheless, he fought bravely". Barrington proved vulnerable as his expressive face encouraged the fast bowlers and he ducked late, making him look ungainly. His roommate Ray Illingworth said he cried at night because of his injuries and Hall marked him out for his most hostile bowling. Barrington made 16 and 4 in the Third Test and was barely declared fit for the Fourth Test after suffering from bronchial asthma and being hit on the elbow by Hall. He retired hurt for a few minutes, but declined to go to hospital and resumed his innings even though he could not play any strokes, making 5 runs in a stand of 39 with Dave Allen and making a duck in the second innings. He returned to hook and cut his way to 69 in the last Test.

England won the series 1–0, the first time they had won a Test series in the Caribbean and Barrington's 420 runs (46.66) were an important part of this victory.

=== South Africa 1960 ===
Barrington made six 50s in his first ten innings for Surrey, but then had a string of low scores and was made twelfth man for the First Test against South Africa. This hit him deeply and he told Micky Stewart "They'll never be able to leave me out again, I am going to see to that". He made 126, 63 and 62 in his next three matches and was back in the team for the Second Test at Lord's, famous for the South African bowler Geoff Griffin taking a hat-trick and being no-balled out of Test cricket. Barrington made only 24 in England's innings victory, top-scored with 80 in the Third Test and hit the winning run after being missed in the slips before scoring. He top-scored in both innings in the Fourth Test with 76 and 35 and was dismissed by Trevor Goddard for the fourth time in a row. He failed in the Fifth Test, but England won 3–0 and Barrington ended with 227 runs (37.83). There was no tour that winter, so he went to Rhodesia and South Africa with the International Cavaliers, under Richie Benaud, who taught him the flipper, and he became friends with Bobby Simpson.

=== Australia 1961 ===
Australia toured in 1961 with what was seen as the weakest team they had brought to England for years. Barrington broke a toe early in the season, but recovered to hit 151 not out against Hampshire and played in the First Test at Edgbaston. Here he dropped Bill Lawry and Bobby Simpson at slip and as a result gave up fielding in the slips as he felt it required too much concentration and interfered with his batting. Even so, when John Murray was ill he took over as wicket-keeper. Despite their perceived weakness Australia gained a massive 321 run first innings lead and Barrington joined Ted Dexter in a salvage operation on the last day. To counter his weakness against fast bowling he took the unusual decision to change to a face on stance for the second innings, which he kept for the rest of his career. Dexter hit 180 while Barrington hung on for 190 minutes making 48 not out in their partnership of 161 and the match was saved.

He played another rearguard innings of 66 at Lord's in the Second Test and 78 in the first innings of the famous Fourth Test at Old Trafford. He had been ordered by the Chairman of Selectors Gubby Allen to hit out after the tea break and his resulting dismissal saw England fall from 358/6 to 367 all out. In the second innings he was lbw to the part-time bowling of Ken Mackay in England's collapse from 150/1 to 201 all out as they lost the Test by 54 runs and failed to regain the Ashes as expected.

Meeting the Australians for Surrey he made 12 and 68 not out (out of 100, the next highest score was 9), then 163, 95, 125 not out, 40, 17 and 78 to ensure his place in the Fifth Test on his home ground. He had fractured his wrist against Middlesex, but played anyway and made 53 and 83 in the draw. He ended with a solid 364 runs (45.50) and 2,070 first-class runs (59.14), but still had to make a Test century in England.

== Under Ted Dexter 1961–64 ==
=== India and Pakistan 1961–62 ===
In an odd schedule the England team played Pakistan before going to India for a 5 Test series and returning to complete the series against Pakistan. In the First Test at Lahore England made a slow 380 batting second with Barrington adding 192 with M.J.K. Smith until he ran out his partner for 99 and himself for 139 after batting for over 7 hours. Pakistan collapsed suddenly in the second innings and England won a surprise victory by 5 wickets.

In India they played the Combined Universities at Poona and Barrington made 149 not out in 290 minutes, and when he took two wickets there was a pitch invasion as the crowd gave him presents, including a pair of sunglasses, which he used for the rest of the match, even when bowling. The match was broadcast on radio and Barrington became a star, which he played up to throughout the tour with imitations of Gary Sobers and a pompous Colonel, playing football with the ball and putting his fingers in his ears when the crowd shouted "Mora, Mora" (have a go). On a more practical side he forsook local food, living off egg and chips for almost the entire tour and kept an array of medicines to ward off illness (he lost 8 lbs before the First Test). He was a great success in the series with innings of 151 not out, 52 not out, 21, 172, 113 not out, 14, 3, 20 and 48; a total of 594 runs (99.00). He made four centuries in four successive Tests for the first time, but the hosts won the Fourth and Fifth Tests.

Returning to Pakistan he made 84 in the Second Test, but missed the Third due to fibrositis. He finished with 229 runs (76.33) in the series against Pakistan and 1,329 runs (69.94) on the tour, nearly 300 more than anyone else and top of the averages. It was no surprise that he was named the Indian Cricket Cricketer of the Year 1962.

=== Pakistan 1962 ===
Barrington had a poor season in 1962, tonsillitis robbed him of match practice before the First Test against the visiting Pakistanis and he made only 10 runs in the first three Tests. He was dropped for the Fourth Test, but recalled for the Fifth at the Oval, where he came in at 365/2 and made 50 not out. He made only 60 runs (20.00), but did better for Surrey, making 1,865 first-class runs (49.07) in the season and was kept in the team set to tour Australia and New Zealand.

=== Australia and New Zealand 1962–63 ===
Barrington made 104 against South Australia at the Adelaide Oval (a ground where he never failed to score at least 50 runs in the 10 innings he played there), 219 not out against an Australian XI as the MCC made 633/7, the highest score by the MCC or England at the Melbourne Cricket Ground, and 183 not out against Queensland at the Gabba. He did little in the first three Tests, making 78 in the first innings of the First Test at Brisbane, where he hit 6 fours in 20 minutes off the leg-spin of Richie Benaud and Bobby Simpson, but then took another 210 minutes to make 40 more runs. England won the Second Test at Melbourne and Australia the Third Test at Sydney and it was in the Fourth Test at Adelaide that he came into his own.

He made 63 in the first innings and came in at 2/1 soon 4/2 in the second chasing 356 to win. Barrington looked completely assured and began sweeping the Australian spin bowlers as Benaud, Simpson and Norm O'Neill all tried their arm. He reached his ton with a pull for six off Simpson over long-on, his seventh Test century and his first against Australia. Barrington finished with 2 sixes and 16 fours in his 132 not out and he and Graveney (36 not out) played out the day with an unbeaten partnership of 101 to make England safe at 223/4. In the deciding Fifth Test at Sydney England started with a 9-hour 321 with Barrington entrenched at one end. The famous Sydney Hill become restless, with Barrington raising his cap when he was jeered and a slow hand clap started around the ground. He was out for 101 after 320 minutes.

In the second innings Dexter was determined to declare so he could dismiss the Australians and regain the Ashes, but Barrington made a sluggish 94. The match was drawn, but Barrington made 582 runs (72.75) in the series, more runs at a higher average than any other batsman on either side, and the most by an English batsman in Australia since Wally Hammond made 905 runs (113.12) in 1928–29.

Travelling on to New Zealand the opposition was less fierce (New Zealand would not defeat England in a Test match until 1978). In the First Test at Auckland he made 126 and when the leg-side crowd barracked him he hooked a couple of fours to their boundary, then a six to the off-side when the crowd there shouted "What about us?" In all he hit 15 fours and a six as England made 562/7 and won by an innings. He made 76 in the Second Test to give him six consecutive 50s in Test cricket (63, 132 not out, 101, 94, 126 and 76), an England record he shares with Patsy Hendren, Ted Dexter and Alastair Cook. Barrington made 47 and 45 as a makeshift opener in the Third Test and made 294 runs (73.50) as England won the series 3–0. His 1,763 first-class runs (80.13) was only 18 short of Denis Compton's record for an MCC tour.

=== West Indies 1963 ===
With the Ashes left in Australia the English press focused on Barrington's achievements and much was hoped for against the West Indies in 1963. Frank Worrell was the first full-time African-Caribbean cricketer to captain the West Indies and had a colourful team in the shape of Conrad Hunte, Rohan Kanhai, Gary Sobers, Basil Butcher, Lance Gibbs, Wes Hall and Charlie Griffith. Barrington made 110 not out against them for Surrey (the next highest score was 22) and joked that the Test match would be over in three days as England had gone 13 Tests against the West Indies without defeat. The First Test was a rude awakening as he was out for 16 and 8 and England lost by ten wickets.

The Second Test at Lord's is one of the Great Tests; the West Indies made 301 and Barrington top scored with 80 in England's reply of 297. The West Indies were out for 229 in the second innings and England needed 234 to win. Barrington made 60, added 99 runs with Colin Cowdrey (whose arm was broken by Wes Hall) and Brian Close and hit Gibbs for a six followed by another onto the Lord's balcony. A last minute collapse left England 228/9 with Cowdrey returning to the crease in the last over with victory, defeat, a tie or a draw still possible. As it was Dave Allen played for a draw.

Fred Trueman's 12/119 won the Third Test at Edgbaston, but Barrington made only 9 and 1, followed by 25, 32, 16 and 28 as Worrell's team won the last two Tests and the series 3–1. For all the excitement provided by the tourists it was a bad series for Barrington as this was the kind of cricket he had forsaken and his 275 runs (27.50) were less than what was expected of him. Even so, he published his first book with Phil Riley called Running in Hundreds, detailing his struggle to play for England and rise to fame.

=== India 1963–64 ===
The MCC returned to India under M.J.K. Smith, again with a weakened team, but after his last triumph Barrington was keen to tour. He made 80 in 312 minutes in the First Test at Madras when England were trying to avoid defeat and the spinner Bapu Nadkarni bowled 131 balls without conceding a run. The Test was drawn and in a tour match at Ahmedabad Barrington made 72 and broke his finger fielding. He was out for the rest of the injury-struck tour (England were reduced to 10 men at one point and Smith considered calling up Henry Blofeld) and returned to Surrey to organise his benefit.

=== Australia 1964 ===
Surrey made 1964 Barrington's Benefit year and with a variety of cricket and football matches, dances other fundraisers he made £10,702, the sixth highest earning benefit at the time, and enough money to buy a newly built four bedroom detached house in Feltham.

Barrington's great friend Bobby Simpson led the Australian cricket team in England in 1964, strong in batting, but weak in bowling. The first two Tests were rain-soaked draws and they went to Headingley for the Third Test with Barrington having done little – his last 10 innings in England had produced 200 runs. Australia had 121 run lead in the first innings. England's reply depended heavily on Barrington who made 85 (the next highest score was 32) until he had an unlucky lbw decision and they were all out for 229. Australia easily made 111/3 to win and go 1–0 up in the series.

The Fourth Test at Old Trafford saw Simpson winning the toss and making the first Test century of his career, 311 in Australia's 656/8. In reply Barrington made his first Test century in England and his highest Test score; 256 in 683 minutes with 26 fours and adding 246 for the third wicket with Dexter; "It was a spirited reply that captured the imagination, but the inevitable draw meant that the Ashes stayed with Australia". It is the third highest score for England against Australia after Len Hutton's 364 and R.E. Foster's 287 and is the highest since the Second World War. Before he started his innings his wife had sent him a telegram Vincit qui patitur (he who endures conquers). England made 611, the first time that two teams had both made 600 runs in an innings in the same Test.

A few days later his smashed 83 in 27 minutes at Reading in one of his benefit matches, hitting 7 sixes, breaking the pavilion roof and followed this up with 207 against Nottinghamshire to give him back-to-back first-class double centuries.

In the Fifth Test Trueman took his 300th Test wicket, Geoff Boycott made his maiden Test century and Barrington made 47 and 54 not out, but the rain guaranteed a draw and Australia won the series 1–0. Barrington made 531 runs (75.85) – more than anyone else on either side and only Simpson averaged higher with his 458 runs (76.33) – as he began the most fruitful period of his career.

== Under M.J.K. Smith 1964–66 ==
=== South Africa 1964–65 ===
Barrington was made a tour selector and unexpectedly granted permission to bring his wife Ann to South Africa, so she quit her job to join him on the tour. Fears that she would affect his form were put to rest with innings of 76, 24 not out, 169, 2, 169 not out and 82 running up the First Test, where his 148 not out (in 432 minutes) set up a surprise innings victory on a spinning wicket. With a weak bowling attack Barrington's leg-spin was encouraged and he took 5/29 and 4/25 against South African Universities.

In the Second Test England enforced the follow on after another Barrington century – 121 – was brought up with a six as he added 191 with Dexter for the third wicket, but Colin Bland dug in for 144 not out as South Africa held out for a draw.

The Third Test at Cape Town saw Barlow refusing to walk after giving a catch to Peter Parfitt and being given not out. He made 138 and South Africa 501/7 after winning the toss. This caused a furore as the England players refused to acknowledge his hundred and were only calmed down by an apology. The matter was re-opened by Barrington who was given not out at 49, then walked off as he had nicked the ball to Lindsay. It made little difference to the game, England made 442 in another draw, but in the South African second innings he took 3/4, his best bowling in Tests. Barrington opened the batting with Geoff Boycott and made 14 not out.

Moving on to Johannesburg Barrington advised Smith to field on the moist wicket after winning the toss, but South Africa made 390/6 and though he made 93 and 11 it was only due to a gritty 76 not out from Boycott that England survived. Against Griqualand West Barrington took his best first-class figures of 7/40 (9/69 in the match) and England went into the Fifth Test needing a draw to win the series.

Trevor Goddard won the toss and South Africa made 502, but too slowly to force a result. Boycott made 117 and Barrington 72 in England's even slower reply and the game was drawn. England won the series 1–0, the last team to beat the Springboks until 1997–98. Barrington was the chief scorer with 508 runs (101.60) in the Tests and 1128 runs (86.76) on the tour. He also topped the tour bowling averages with 24 wickets (7.25), but leg-spin was out of fashion and was barely used in the Tests. Even so, he was named the South African Cricket Annual Cricketer of the Year 1965.

=== New Zealand 1965 ===
English cricket was now entirely professional and cricketers like Barrington and Geoff Boycott ground out long, defensive innings for the maximum of runs and the minimum of risk. With slow over-rates, negative fielding and time-wasting, it was thought that cricket was dying a slow death as spectators found other entertainment. The exception was the colourful West Indies team under Frank Worrell and to fit in an extra tour in 1966 South Africa had theirs moved to 1965 and for the first time since 1912 two Test series were played in an English summer, with John Reid's weak New Zealand team having its five Tests reduced to three. Barrington was out of form, and had been berated by the Surrey captain Micky Stewart for slow scoring, but was retained in the England team for the First Test at Edgbaston.

This was the most controversial of his career as he played himself into form by taking 437 minutes to make 137 against a poor bowling attack and "almost brought the game to a standstill". Coming in at 54/1 he spent an hour without scoring even though Mike Smith asked him to hurry up. As if to show that he was wilfully obstinate he hit 2 fours and a six in one over to bring up his hundred after six hours and was the last man out in a total of 435.

Though England won by 9 wickets Barrington was dropped for slow-scoring "for the good of cricket" and the Chairman of Selectors Doug Insole wrote to him "it is the only practical way of demonstrating that we're not prepared to condone cricket of the Edgbaston variety". Barrington was depressed and even considered retirement, but worked on his batting and made 70 and 129 not out for Surrey against the tourists.

England won the Second Test and with Boycott and Dexter injured Barrington was recalled for the Third Test at Headingley. Here he made 163 at twice the speed as his Edgbaston century, struck 26 fours and added 369 with John Edrich (310 not out) in just over a day, Mike Smith declared on 546/4 and New Zealand lost by an innings and 187 runs. His two innings gave him 300 runs (150.00) in the series.

=== South Africa 1965 ===
Peter van der Merwe's South Africans were a tough outfit and the First Test was played at Lord's. South Africa made 280 and England were 88/3 when Barrington hit the ball all around the wicket, making 79 of the 123 runs scored between lunch and tea before he was run out by the master fielder Colin Bland for 91. Needing 191 to win the second innings he made only 18 as England settled for a draw at 145/7. The Second Test at Trent Bridge was won by the Pollock brothers, Graeme hitting 125 and 59 and Peter taking 10/87, dismissing Barrington for 1 in each innings in their 94 run victory. In the Third Test at the Oval England were set 399 to win and Barrington made 73, adding 135 with Colin Cowdrey to take England to 308/4 when rain ended play. It was South Africa's first series victory over England since 1935, their last overseas Test series until 1994 and Barrington totalled 202 runs (33.66).

The finale of the season was the Gillette Cup Final between Surrey and Yorkshire. Barrington had hit 68 not out against Middlesex in the semi-final, his 91 runs with Mike Edwards coming at 10 runs an over, but Yorkshire made 317/4 with Boycott hitting 146 and Barrington's 5 overs going for 54 runs. In return he was out to Fred Trueman for a duck and Surrey lost by 175 runs.

=== Australia 1965–66 ===
Mike Smith led the MCC tour of Australia in 1965–66 determined not only to regain the Ashes, but to play entertaining cricket. Barrington's mother had been ill and his father-in-law died when he reached Australia. He was in poor form until the arrived at this favourite venue—the Adelaide Oval—where he made 51 and 69 in the MCC's 6 wicket win over South Australia. At the MCG he took 4/24 to spin out the Victorian tail and hit 158 in the run chase that the tourists lost by 32 runs, "an innings of rugged, fighting grandeur".

He made 53, 38 and 63 in the drawn Tests at Brisbane and Melbourne and just 1 in England's innings victory in the Third Test at Sydney. The Australians fought back in the Fourth Test at Adelaide with Graham McKenzie taking 6/48 to dismiss England for 241 with only Barrington showing resistance with 60. Bobby Simpson (225) and Bill Lawry (119) passed this before losing a wicket and England were left to make 275 to avoid an innings defeat. Here bright cricket failed them as only Barrington with 102 and Fred Titmus with 53 showed any staying power. Barrington batted for 359 minutes and hit only 4 fours and E.W. Swanton thought he "looked capable of going on for ever", but Neil Hawke took 5/54 and England lost by an innings.

The Fifth Test at Melbourne was to decide the Ashes and quick runs were needed when Barrington came in at 41/2. In one of his few sustained hitting displays he made 63 off 101 balls then hit Keith Stackpole over long on for six and brought up his century 20 balls later with a six into the South Stand off Tom Veivers. His hundred came off 122 balls and won him "one of the most moving ovations I have heard in Australia", and the Walter Lawrence Trophy for the fastest Test century of 1966. He was caught for 115 by Wally Grout who told Doug Walters to bowl him a ball down the leg so that he could move over and catch the glance. England made 485/9, but a day was lost to rain and Bob Cowper made 307 to ensure a draw.

Barrington made a series total of 464 (66.28), topped the England averages again and with 946 runs (67.57) and 6 wickets (24.83) and headed the batting and bowling averages on the tour. He was excused the tour to New Zealand and was allowed to return home due to fatigue.

== Under Colin Cowdrey and Brian Close 1966–68 ==
=== West Indies 1966 ===
Barrington returned to England exhausted after the Australian tour, but had to attend Surrey's pre-season training and social functions that gave him little chance to rest. Gary Sobers returned with the West Indies in 1966 including Charlie Griffith who had been accused of throwing by the Australians Bobby Simpson, Norm O'Neill and Wally Grout. Barrington added fuel to the fire by telling the Daily Mail that he thought Griffith was a chucker and that he would refuse to play against him. He had been the target of West Indian fast bowling in 1959–60 and 1963 and saw no reason why he should suffer at the hands of a man who was not playing the game fair. This caused a falling out with the West Indian team as Sobers was satisfied that Griffith had a legitimate action and, after all, he had not been called in 1963.

Barrington's form was poor, but just before the First Test he made 103 not out in a total of 157/9 against Northamptonshire. At Old Trafford the West Indies won the toss and made 484 and when Barrington came in at 11/1 the West Indian fans called out "Wait till you get to Charlie's end". When he did he pushed back a half volley and was caught and bowled for 5. He made 30 in the follow on, England lost by an innings and M.J.K. Smith was removed from the captaincy. On his wife's advice he saw a doctor who diagnosed physical fatigue and recommended a restful holiday, but in the middle of the season Barrington refused.

He played in the Second Test at Lord's with Colin Cowdrey in charge, but made only 19 and 5 in the drawn match. He was selected for the Third Test, but admitted to the selector Alec Bedser that he was not well and withdrew from the Test series (which England lost 3–1), having made only 59 runs (14.75). He stayed at home for a few days, then took a week-long holiday in Bournemouth. There was no tour that winter and he was able to take a rest, cancel social functions and published his second book with Phil Riley Playing It Straight.

=== India and Pakistan 1967 ===
Refreshed after a winter's rest Barrington was in fine form in 1967, starting with 26, 62, 63, 95, 41, 60, 82, 14, 84, 27 not out and 32 in the wettest May since 1773 when batsmen were struggling. He captained Surrey to victory over the visiting Indians and was recalled for the First Test at Headingley.

Brian Close had taken over the captaincy in the last Test of 1966 and chose to bat after winning the toss. Barrington survived the early swing to make 93 and added 139 with Geoff Boycott whose 573-minute 246 not out had him dropped for slow scoring a la Barrington. India made 510 after following on and England won by 6 wickets after Barrington made 46 opening with his Surrey teammate John Edrich instead of the injured Boycott.

Barrington was asked to open again in the Second Test at Lord's and made 97 in England's innings victory. Returning to number 3 in the Third Test at Edgbaston he was dropped on 0 and hit 9 fours and 2 sixes in his 75, though the team slumped to 191/8 until John Murray hit out with 77 to make England 298 as they won by 132 runs. Barrington made 324 runs (64.80).

In between the series he made 158 not out and took 5/51 as Surrey beat the champions Yorkshire just before the First Test. There he made 148, his first Test century at Lord's, and became the sixth batsman to make 6,000 Test runs after Wally Hammond, Don Bradman, Len Hutton, Neil Harvey and Colin Cowdrey. Pakistan were saved by 187 not out by their captain Hanif Mohammed and after Barrington made 14 in the second innings the game was drawn.

Half the England team was dropped for the Second Test at Trent Bridge and after Pakistan were out for 140 Barrington made a sheet-anchor 109 not out in England's reply of 252, an innings that lasted 409 minutes and 117 overs on a saturated pitch, which was enough for a 10 wicket victory. Barrington had been ordered by Close to take no chances, but E.W. Swanton wrote that "Barrington grafted away, an automatic slow-motion accumulator...the personification of the modern coldly efficient hyper-professional performance". Strangely he was defended by the old Surrey captain and big-hitter Percy Fender "I am no advocate of slow scoring...but there are times when the demands of the game, situation and the interests of the side make it necessary".

Close meanwhile had been found guilty of gamesmanship in a county game and was to be replaced for the MCC tour of the West Indies. He remained in charge for the Third Test at the Oval and he stayed at Ken's house so that he could avoid the press. On his home ground Barrington advised him to put Pakistan in to bat and they were out for 216, England replied with 440 with Barrington himself making 142 in 344 minutes, hitting 141 runs in 152 minutes with Tom Graveney and striking 14 fours. His 19 Test centuries equalled Len Hutton's total with only Wally Hammond's 22 ahead of them, and he became the first England batsmen to make a hundred on the six traditional Test cricket grounds of Old Trafford, Edgbaston, Headingley, Lord's, Trent Bridge and the Oval. He made 13 not out in the second innings in England's 8 wicket victory and his 426 runs (142.00) placed him at the top of the series averages. Hs 2,059 runs (68.63) were the most made in the season, Dennis Amiss coming second in the averages with 1260 runs (54.41).

=== West Indies 1967–68 ===
We're being taken for the biggest ride I can remember – the umpiring, the crowd and Charlie. I promise I won't say anything to anybody, but it is downright cheating...this isn't England vs the West Indies...Some of the remarks from the crowd are too awful, shouting "kill" at us. I must be bloody mad to come out here.
– Ken Barrington

Barrington and the MCC fared poorly in the run up matches and with West Indian supporters constantly telling him "Charlie's waiting for you man. He'll kill you". Barrington was so upset that told his wife that he wouldn't tour again.

In the First Test at the Queen's Park Oval in Trinidad Cowdrey won the toss and batted with Boycott and Edrich adding 80 for the first wicket and Barrington coming in against the spinners at 110/2. Soon after Gary Sobers responded to the crowd and brought on Griffith, but Barrington twice called him to halt as the chanting of the crowd interfered with his concentration. Although hit with bouncers on the shoulders and back he survived the five over spell and the tired bowler was taken off. He brought up his 50 with a six off Lance Gibbs and added 134 with Cowdrey and 188 with Tom Graveney before hitting Gibbs for another six to bring up his 20th century. When he saw the ball sailing into the stands the 37-year-old Barrington took off his cap and waved his fist in triumph. He was finally caught by Griffith off Gibbs for 143, the second time that he had made a century in four successive Tests. England made 568 and the West Indies followed on (Barrington dismissing Sobers), but survived the last day on 243/8 for a draw.

Barrington made 63 in the Second Test at Sabina Park, Jamaica, again stopping Griffith's run up as the crowd went wild. John Snow took 7/49 and the West Indies followed on again, but when the local favourite Basil Butcher was out at 204/5 the crowd disagreed with the decision and rioted, even though Butcher had walked. Tear gas was used by the Jamaican police to restore order and play resumed, but the England team lost their hold on the game as Sobers made 113 not out and the West indies 391/9. Needing only 159 to win England collapsed to 68/8 (Barrington 13), but somehow managed a draw.

The Third Test at Bridgetown, Barbados was another draw (Barrington 17) and the Fourth back at Trinidad looked like going the same way. The West Indies had made 526/7 and England replied with 404, where Cowdrey (148) and Barrington (48) added 133 for the third wicket. Sobers, remembering the England collapse in the Second Test declared at 92/2 leaving England 215 to win in 165 minutes, a run-rate they had yet to achieve in the series. Cowdrey was uncertain, but Barrington convinced him to go for the win, shouting "Will we go for it? Of course we'll go for it. That's what we've come all this way for, isn't it?" Barrington did not bat, but England made 215/3 and won by seven wickets.

Sobers was lambasted by the Caribbean press for his cavalier declaration, but responded in the Fifth Test in Georgetown, Guyana with 152 and 95 not out, Barrington taking his wicket again in the first innings, and England were struggling at 206/9 when stumps were pulled on the last day, but they drew the match and won the series. Barrington had made only 4 and 0, but finished with 288 runs (41.14) and 5 wickets (51.40), having dismissed Sobers and Seymour Nurse twice each and the opener Steve Camacho.

=== Australia 1968 ===
Barrington had flu at the start of the season, made a depressing pair against Derbyshire and withdrew from the First Test due to back trouble, which Australia won. He returned for the Second Test at Lord's and made a patient 75 after having retired hurt on 61 with a broken finger from Garth McKenzie. The Queen also asked about his finger when the teams were presented to her, as is traditional at Lord's.

In the Third Test at Edgbaston Barrington was out lbw by Eric Freeman and the game was another rained-off draw. Both Cowdrey and Bill Lawry were ill for the Fourth Test at Headingley, and the stand-in captains settled for a third successive draw, with Barrington making 49 and 46 not out. Needing to win at the Oval to share the series the slow-scoring Barrington was dropped, but England won the Fifth Test with five minutes to spare. Barrington was named for the tour of South Africa in 1968–69, but this was cancelled when Basil d'Oliveira was belatedly included and the South African government refused to allow him to play.

Ken Barrington's Test series batting averages Source
Opponents	Season	Home country	Tests	Innings	Not Out	Runs	Highest score	Average	100s	50s	Caught
South Africa	1955	England	2	3		52	34	17.33			
India	1959	England	5	6		357	87	59.50		4	5
West Indies	1959–60	West Indies	5	9		420	128	46.66	2	1	2
South Africa	1960	England	4	7	1	227	80	37.83		2	
Australia	1961	England	5	9	1	364	83	45.50		4	4
Pakistan	1961–62	Pakistan	2	3		229	139	76.33	1	1	1
India	1961–62	India	5	9	3	594	172	99.00	3	1	2
Pakistan	1962	England	4	4	1	60	50*	20.00		1	3
Australia	1962–63	Australia	5	10	2	582	132*	72.75	2	3	6
New Zealand	1962–63	New Zealand	3	4		294	126	73.50	1	1	5
West Indies	1963	England	5	10		275	80	27.50		2	3
India	1963–64	India	1	1		80	80	80.00		1	
Australia	1964	England	5	8	1	531	256	75.85	1	2	3
South Africa	1964–65	South Africa	5	7	2	508	148*	101.60	2	2	3
New Zealand	1965	England	2	2		300	163	150.00	2		3
South Africa	1965	England	3	6		202	91	33.66		2	5
Australia	1965–66	Australia	5	8	1	464	115	66.28	2	3	3
West Indies	1966	England	2	4		59	30	14.75			
India	1967	England	3	5		324	97	64.80		3	2
Pakistan	1967	England	3	5	2	426	148	142.00	3		3
West Indies	1967–68	West Indies	5	7		288	143	41.14	1	1	2
Australia	1968	England	3	4	1	170	75	56.66		1	3
Total	1955–68		82	131	15	6,806	256	58.67	20	35	58

== Interlude 1968–74 ==
=== Israel and Australia 1968–69 ===
With no winter tour Barrington took up a couple of private tours, he captained the first cricket tour of Israel with Bournemouth '5705' Cricket Club, which arrived in the aftermath of the Six-Day War. He made a century and was elected the first president of the Israeli Cricket Supporters' Association.

After his return he went to Australia with Colin Milburn to contest the first World Double-Wicket Championship, they lost to Gary Sobers and Wes Hall, beat Bobby Simpson and Garth McKenzie, lost to Bill Lawry and Doug Walters and finally beat Charlie Griffith and Rohan Kanhai. At this last game at the St Kilda Cricket Ground in Melbourne on Saturday, 12 October he had a pain in his arms as he was going to shower and collapsed to the ground. He was helped to a chair and then a massage table and a call was made to the crowd for a doctor. As he was taken away in an ambulance to Prince Henry's Hospital Charlie Griffith told him "Don’t' worry Kenny, you'll be all right". Simpson called his wife Ann, who flew in from London, and Ken was given a room with a view of the MCG. He had had a thrombosis, but the heart muscles repaired themselves and he made a full recovery. Telegrams and cards arrived from all around the world and the Chairman of Selectors Doug Insole visited him in hospital.

Barrington was told to take a complete rest and returned to England on the SS Canberra, celebrating his 38th birthday with a cake shaped like a cricket bat. It was hoped that he would return to Test cricket, but after consulting a Harley Street doctor he was advised to cut out smoking, sleepless nights and the stress of international cricket, though he could continue to play for Surrey. After reflection he announced his retirement from cricket on 16 January 1969 on Sportsnight with David Coleman, having already informed Surrey County Cricket Club and the MCC. The news was met with surprise, but Insole, who had seen Barrington in hospital, had already concluded that he would not play again and wrote his thanks for his "outstanding contribution" to cricket.

=== Home life 1969–74 ===
In 1968 the Barringtons moved to Fetcham and Ken wanted to call the new house Adelaide after the Adelaide Oval (where he had made 10 fifties in a row), but Ann objected and they called it Newlands after Newlands Cricket Ground in Cape Town where he had once made 169 not out. After 15 years of marriage Ann found she was pregnant on 15 April 1969, the start of the cricket season just after Ken had retired, and their son Guy Kenneth Barrington was born on 1 November 1969. He was baptised in 1970 with Colin Cowdrey and Harry Secombe as the godfathers and Betty Surridge as the godmother. They took over a local garage – Ken Barrington Motors Ltd – in 1971, which sold Jaguar and Rover cars and which proved to be a profitable enterprise.

=== Return to cricket 1974–75 ===
Barrington managed the Derrick Robins XI tour of South Africa, a multiracial cricket team led by Brian Close and including Younis Ahmed and John Shepherd in an attempt to restore cricket links with South Africa. When they arrived in Cape Town he found that "all the lads I coached twenty years ago are now big businessmen" and he received a warm welcome. He managed another Derek Robins XI under David Lloyd the next year and although the cricket was a success they failed to re-establish international cricket in South Africa and the attempt to integrate cricket in South Africa failed.

== Test selector 1975–81 ==
Doug Insole used his influence to have Barrington join himself, Alec Bedser, Charlie Elliott and Sir Len Hutton as a selector for the Test and County Cricket Board (TCCB), which chose the England cricket team. As a selector Barrington tended to favour experience and current form over potential.

=== India and Australia 1976–77 ===
After passing a medical Barrington was chosen to manage the MCC tour of India in 1976–77, where his own legendary status was soon emulated by that of Tony Greig. In the First Test John Lever took 10/70 as England won by an innings. In the Second Test Barrington advised Greig to bat as long as possible so that India would have to bat on a wearing pitch. The England captain took 434 minutes making 103 with a fever, India were bowled out for 181 in the second innings and England won by 10 wickets. Another win in the Third Test gave England their first series victory in India since Douglas Jardine in 1933–34, but it was spoilt by accusations by the Indian captain Bishan Bedi that Lever used Vaseline to shine the ball. After investigation the matter was referred the MCC. Barrington diplomatically thanked the Indian Board for not finding anything averse and was criticised for not defending his players more, but as Lever said "if he had overreacted, the tour could have been called off".

England lost the Fourth Test to some dubious umpiring and Barrington, while scathing in his official report, declined to publicly voice his complaints to the press. At the end of the tour he was joined by Ann, who did secretarial work for him and the team, and the Fifth test was drawn for a 3–1 series win.

After the India tour the team proceeded to Australia for the Centenary Test at the Melbourne Cricket Ground, a gathering of almost every Ashes Test player from England and Australia. Apart from the cricket the Test was secretly used to recruit English and Australia players for Kerry Packer's World Series Cricket (WSC). Tony Greig became a leading Packer recruiter and Barrington was kept in the dark as he would have to report any such activity to the TCCB. Ironically, Barrington secretly gathered guests for Greig's appearance on This Is Your Life on their return to England.

=== Australia 1977 ===
The Packer Crisis emerged after a party in Greig's house during the game between Sussex and the Australian tourists, at which several pressmen were present. Barrington had long advocated the selection of his former teammate Geoff Boycott and after a three-year exile he was recalled to the England team with great success. With the prospect of losing so many senior players Barrington was also keen to bring in some new players and encouraged the selection of Ian Botham, who he predicted "could become another Keith Miller". With Brearley's shrewd captaincy, Boycott making two centuries and Botham taking two 5-wicket hauls England defeated a divided Australian team 3–0 and regained the Ashes.

=== Pakistan 1977–78 ===
Barrington was chosen to manage the forthcoming tour of Pakistan in the first season of the WSC, both sides losing players as a result. Phil Edmonds and Paul Downton were taken on the tour, Downton on Barrington's advice after playing only a few county games. Barrington gave Edmonds long practise sessions in the nets to improve his spin bowling. The team arrived in the wake of General Muhammad Zia-ul-Haq's military coup displacing Prime Minister Zulfikar Ali Bhutto and the country was in a state of high tension and disorder. In the First Test 40,000 Bhutto supporters rioted at the ground and the teams took refuge in their dressing rooms as the army restored order. The TCCB gave Barrington permission to cancel the tour if he saw fit. Realising this the players urged him to let them go home for Christmas.

In the Second Test England collapsed in the first innings to the leg-spinner Abdul Qadir (6/44), but Barrington bowled his own leg-spin at Brearley and Boycott for an hour before the second innings and their 185 opening stand saved the game.

The Third Test was surrounded by controversy as Pakistan wanted to bring in their WSC players Zaheer Abbas, Mushtaq Mohammad and Imran Khan to win a series victory in the last Test. This would have given them an edge over an England team without its WSC veterans. Several England players led by the vice-captain Geoff Boycott, Bob Willis and Derek Randall refused to play Pakistan with their Packer players and Barrington and Brearley tried to negotiate between the players, the TCCB and the Pakistani cricket authorities. Matters were made worst by Mike Brearley breaking his arm and returning to England, leaving the uncompromising Boycott as captain and Willis as vice-captain. Fortunately, the Pakistani players could only play by breaking their WSC contracts, which they refused to do, and the Test was drawn. Barrington was out of his depth in these political matters, even though Willis later admitted that his determination for the Test to be played regardless was the right course.

=== New Zealand 1977–78 ===
In New Zealand Barrington saw that the training facilities and grounds were poor compared to those in England, but he praised the New Zealanders for their efforts. "No manager worked harder on behalf of his players nor was better appreciated. Certainly no player on that tour that I spoke to would dissent from this view".

=== Australia 1978–79 and 1979–80 ===
The tour of Australia in 1978–79 was in direct competition with Kerry Packer's WSC and Doug Insole was made the team manager to deal with the social calendar, finances and any cricket diplomacy. Barrington was made his assistant-manager in charge of the cricket, in effect a team coach. The two were old friends and Barrington was more than pleased to have some of the huge workload taken off his back; "I don't have to worry about accounts, banks, hotels, functions, team problems, press, Boycott, etc."

The English WSC players were unavailable so youngsters like Ian Botham, Phil Edmonds, David Gower, Graham Gooch and John Emburey were on the tour with the old hands Mike Brearley, Geoff Boycott, Bob Willis and Bob Taylor. This gave them an advantage over Australia who had no experienced players in their team, though they had the young batsmen Allan Border and Kim Hughes and the fast bowler Rodney Hogg, who took a record 41 wickets (12.85). The batting was poor throughout the series on both sides, a concern for Barrington, but England won 5–1 and there were no other problems.

=== West Indies and Australia 1980 ===
With Mike Brearley no longer willing to tour a new England captain was needed. Barrington advocated Botham, who at the time averaged 40.48 with the bat and 18.52 with the ball and was England's golden boy. In the end the appointment failed as Botham's form evaporated under the strain of captaincy and his first 17 Tests would be against the two toughest teams in the world; Australia and the West Indies. In 1980 the First Test was almost won when Willis took 5/65 and the West Indies struggled to a two wicket win. In a wet summer the rest of the Tests were drawn, as was the rain-affected Centenary Test at the end of the season.

=== West Indies 1980–81 ===
With its complicated political problems Alan Smith was made the manager of the tour to the West Indies in 1980–81. For financial reasons there was no assistant manager, but Barrington was appointed after representations from the team, though Stuart Surridge asked him not to go as the strain would be too much. He passed a medical, was eager for another tour and had been a teammate of Smith's in the 1962–63 Ashes series. He got on well with Botham, who wrote "He would fetch me a cup of tea...sit on the bench in the dressing room, raise a point and we would argue about it. A quarter of an hour later I'd find myself doing as he said".

Substandard hotels and cricket facilities, torrential rain and local politics caused many problems. In St Vincent they had net practice surrounded by livestock and they struggled to get food at their hotel in Trinidad. Furthermore, they were up against Clive Lloyd's powerful West Indian team including Viv Richards, Gordon Greenidge, Desmond Haynes, Andy Roberts, Michael Holding, Joel Garner and Colin Croft.

In the First Test, Botham put the West Indies in to bat on a damp wicket that recovered and they made 426/9. England followed on and despite extra rain failed to hold out for a draw. Barrington wrote: "The boys tried hard, but one or two did not apply themselves. Hence the same old story. Lack of first-class batting and application".

In Guyana the Bourda cricket ground was flooded for days and an injury to Willis meant he had to be sent home and replaced by Robin Jackman of Surrey. Jackman had played for Rhodesia in the Currie Cup and after a week of increasing crisis, Guyanese President Forbes Burnham decided that Jackman had to be deported under the Gleneagles Agreement. Barrington was incredulous, and in another malapropism said: "The people wouldn't let old Forbes Burnham deprive them of their cricket: 10,000 to watch a practice match today; it could be a real evolution if he tried it". The TCCB refused to have its team chosen by another country (ironically, it was the South African refusal to accept Basil d'Oliveira that had led to their cricketing isolation) and the Second Test was cancelled.

With all flights out of Guyana fully booked and Barrington now concerned for the team's safety, they even considered using a Royal Navy destroyer to rescue them. Fortunately, seats were made available and they flew to Barbados with great relief. There they had to wait to see if the tour would continue, but the Government of Barbados saw that Gleneagles applied to South African teams rather than individual players and allowed the Third Test to proceed. Ann came to join the team and Jackman was chosen for his Test debut. With the West Indies sent in to bat, Jackman took 3/65 and they were only saved by a century from Lloyd as they struggled to 265. England in turn were out for 122; Barrington chain-smoked on the balcony as the wickets fell, and consoled each batsman as he returned to the dressing room. When the day was finished, he had dinner with Ann and some friends, but when they went to bed he had a heart attack at 10:30 pm on 14 March 1981.

== Death ==
=== Second heart attack ===
When Barrington had his second heart attack, Ann quickly called the team physiotherapist Bernard Thomas from the next room and ran downstairs for help while he tried to resuscitate Ken. She found Alan Smith in the crowded lobby and they called for a doctor and an ambulance, but by the time they arrived Barrington was already dead. They tried to keep the death a secret until his son Guy could be told at his boarding school, but his body had to be sent to the mortuary via the lobby and the news soon leaked. The England captain Ian Botham was told and he and Smith informed each member of the team in the morning. They had a minute's silence at the team meeting before returning to the Kensington Oval, where Barrington had made his maiden Test century 21 years before. The news was announced at the ground and there was another one minute's silence at the beginning of play. The England team were distraught, and Robin Jackman said he couldn't bowl properly as he had tears in his eyes. Unsurprisingly they lost the Test by 298 runs, though Graham Gooch made a fighting 116 in their second innings. He later said:

I had watched Ken Barrington – a great Test batsman – as a boy and when I broke into the England side in the late Seventies he became a father figure. In fact, he was a mentor to a lot of us then – myself, David Gower, Ian Botham, Mike Gatting. Ken was an England selector and assistant manager on the West Indies tour of 1981. There were no official coach in those days but it was to Ken that most of us turned. Unlike many retired pros, he never used the words, 'In my day...'... Kenny was a counsellor, a friend and an inspiration.

=== Funeral and memorial service ===
He was cremated on 23 March 1981 in Leatherhead, Surrey and 150 wreaths were received, including one from each cricket county. Surrey County Cricket Club arranged a memorial service at Southwark Cathedral in April 1981, which had last been done for Sir Jack Hobbs in 1964. It was attended by 700 mourners including Ian Botham and the England cricket team, who had just returned from the Caribbean, Lord Home, the former prime minister, Hector Monro, the Minister for Sport, and many cricketers. The service was led by the ex-England captain David Sheppard, then the Bishop of Liverpool, and Harry Secombe sang "Amazing Grace".

=== Legacy ===
The largest memorial to Ken Barrington is the Ken Barrington Indoor Cricket Centre at the Oval. Surrey County Cricket Club decided in 1983 that as he loved to teach cricket to children they would build a training centre in his name. Prince Charles made the first donation and £1,250,000 was raised by public subscription. Delays in planning permission and the need for further money mean that it was not opened until 31 July 1991, by coincidence the same day as the Surrey vs Essex quarter-final in the NatWest Trophy. The centre was opened by Queen Elizabeth II, Prince Philip, and Prime Minister John Major, the last two keen cricket fans, the Essex and England captain Graham Gooch and of course, Ann and Guy Barrington. The centre contains Ken Barrington memorabilia.

Ken Barrington was a keen member of the Lord's Taverners and in his honour they named the Under-13 Competition winner's silver cup the "Ken Barrington Trophy". There are Ken Barrington Pavilions at Reading, his birthplace, and Great Bookham. Two roads in Reading are named after him, both being on the site of cricket grounds used by Berkshire County Cricket Club. Barrington Way is on the site of Courages Cricket Ground in Coley Park, whilst Barrington Close is on the site of Church Road Cricket Ground in Earley.

Many cricket clubs in Buckinghamshire, England conduct children games (Colts Cricket) according to a simplified set of rules – Barrington Rules – named after Ken's fondness for teaching cricket to children.

== Personality ==
Thanks to his army upbringing Barrington was very neat in his dress and carefully ironed and packed his clothes, and took great care of his cricket equipment. While waiting to bat he would watch the play or prowl the dressing room with a cigarette and would reflect with another cigarette after his dismissal. He rarely drank and preferred to retire early, especially on nights preceding match days. He was brought into cricket when social class and the hierarchy between amateur and professional was still the norm.

At home he could not afford to hire mechanics or decorators and as a result become a car-repairman for his friends and colleagues, and he was a keen DIY man. He was frugal and frequently called up the management of a hotel if the room was not up to standard and argued if they charged too much. Barrington known for his malapropisms such as; "If you pitch it there you put the batsman in two-mans land", "That was good bowling in anyone's cup of tea", "The press went through the food like a swarm of lotuses" and "high-philosophy bullets".

== Playing style ==
Ken's batsmanship displayed different qualities which were not so glamorous, perhaps, but no less essential: determination, courage, application and overwhelming dedication to the task in hand...How reassuring it would have been last summer to have seen that familiar figure once again – square-on stance, cap pulled down, sleeves rolled up, jutting jaw, ready for anything that bowlers could unleash.
– John Major

Ken Barrington started as a free-scoring off-side player, but, determined to regain his place in the England Test team, he opened his stance and became a defensive leg-side player. In the 1960s he was the backbone of the England team, whose batting had proved so fragile to the Australian bowling in the 1958–59 Ashes series, but he was a match-saver rather than a match-winner, always best in a crisis. The selectors, press and public thought that he surrendered the initiative too much to the bowlers, but a batsman of his calibre could not be ignored. He was a great worrier and had trouble sleeping during a Test match or if he was not out overnight, which led in turn to exhaustion. As a batsman he was a nervous waiter in the dressing room and preferred to bat at number three to reduce the tension. He would smoke cigarettes to calm himself down and would watch closely to see how the wicket was playing.

Barrington took his time walking out to the crease and once there he would inspect the pitch and subject it to "incessant prodding", and would hold up play if the captain changed the field so that he could inspect it. A nervous starter he would make 20–30 runs quickly enough, but gave chances to the bowlers, who tried to take advantage of this. Once settled he would slow down and would sink into lethargy until he neared his century, which four times in Tests he brought it up with a massive pull for six. Yet there was method even in this, fielding captains tended to add close-fielders in the 'nervous nineties', so Barrington just hit the ball over their heads into the outfield.

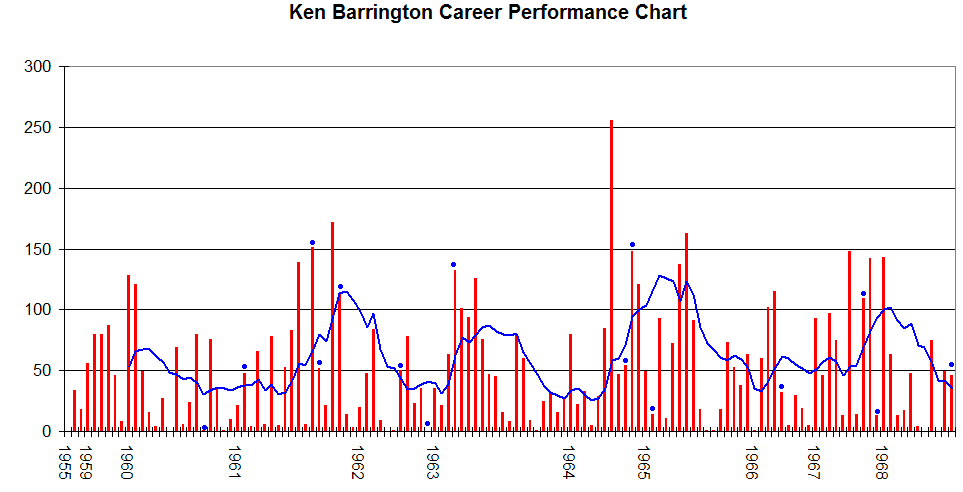
Ken Barrington's career performance graph.

After his initial failure as a Test batsman in 1955 Barrington "set out to eliminate fun from his game and replace it with something very near impregnability". Ian Chappell wrote with feeling "Every so often you encounter a player whose bat seems about a yard wide. It's not, of course. It just seems that way. England's Ken Barrington was one. Our own Bill Lawry was another. Gee, they were hard to dislodge". This was not always appreciated by the selectors, spectators and the press. This lack of appreciation may have been affected by the fact that he scored most of his centuries overseas and that he could play entertaining strokes, but chose not to do so.

He was controversially dropped from the England team after 57 Tests for taking over seven hours to make 137 against a weak New Zealand attack in 1965. But when quick runs were needed in the Fifth Test at Melbourne in 1965–66 he surprised everyone by smashing a hundred off 122 balls and bringing up the century with a six into the stands. Though he rarely expressed open dissent he used to pull faces if he disagreed with an umpire or thought that the light was too bad or the bouncers too frequent. His grimacing and nervous jump when receiving hostile fast bowling led some to believe that he was afraid, but he stood up to Wes Hall, Chester Watson, Charlie Griffith and Peter Pollock even when injured.

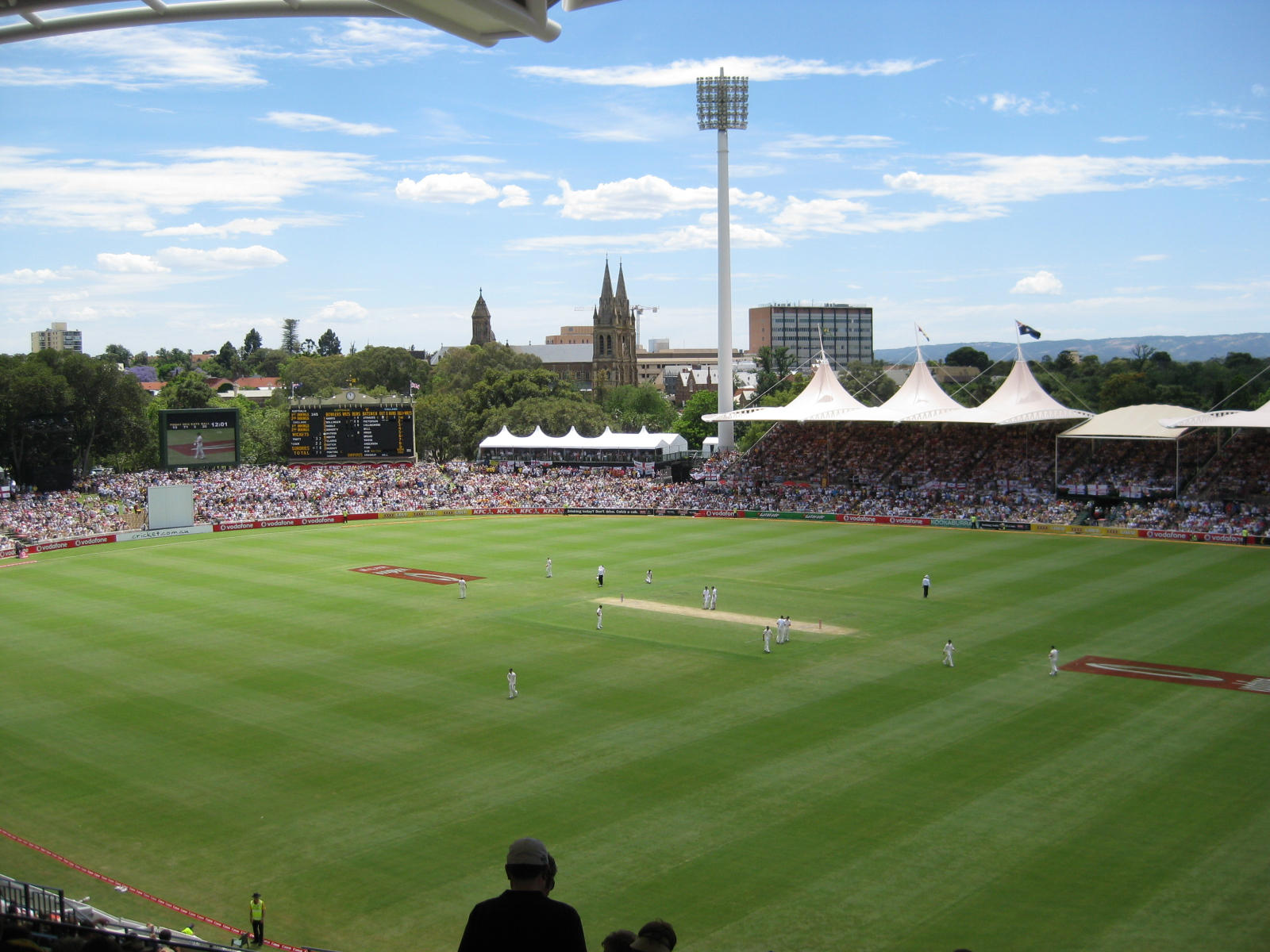
Ken Barrington's favourite venue was the Adelaide Oval, where he scored; 104, 52, 52 not out, 63, 132 not out, 69, 51, 63, 60 and 102, a total of 748 runs (93.50).

Barrington's square stance made the cover drive difficult, and he eliminated it from his repertoire of strokes. Even so, bowlers who faced him attacked the off-stump. As Richie Benaud explained: "It wasn't that he was weak there, but merely he was less strong".

Barrington never lost his ability as a spinner, and it made him very effective against spin bowling, especially that of Benaud. His Surrey teammate Jim Laker wrote: "His concentration was such that when facing slow bowlers, he would actually watch the ball spinning in the air and play it accordingly". His one weakness that he was not a good runner; he seldom wished to relinquish the strike, and thought that quick singles tired a batsman out. His West Country accent meant that "won" (one or run) and "wait" sounded alike, and sometimes a keen batting partner would rush up the wicket only to find Barrington waiting for him to scramble back. John Edrich called him "the worst in the world".

He averaged 69.18 in Tests abroad, and his home average of 50.71. He also made 14 of his 20 Test hundreds on foreign fields, which led to his being appreciated overseas more than he was at home. His humour when playing to the crowd won him widespread admiration in Australia and hero-worship in India.

He holds the record for facing the highest number of balls in a single test match when batting at number four in Test history(624)

As a selector Barrington watched some 80 days of county cricket each year to check new talent and help choose the team. From 1976 he was the manager or assistant-manager in every England tour. In those days a manager led the social side of the tour with speeches and dinners, which initially caused him some difficulty, relations with the local cricketing authorities, umpires and the TCCB as well as coaching and training the side. His strengths were that he had toured these countries before, had contacts, a natural good humour and was an excellent ambassador for the game he loved. As a coach few were better at fielding practice and helping batsmen with their technique in the nets. While he did not coach bowlers so well he could guide them through the weaknesses of the opposition batsmen and general strategy. Although he often grumbled to his team and off the cuff to the English press he was always diplomatic in his official statements. He was an avuncular figure popular with the England players who held him in great respect and called him 'the Colonel', but could also tease him and "eagerly awaited the traditional Barrington reaction of hands on hips, eyes cast in the air and a resigned shake of the head".

Test batting averages of batsman who have made 1000 Test runs Source
Rank	Player	Team	Birth and death	Matches	Innings	Not Out	Runs	Highest score	Average	100s	50s	Ct
1	D.G. Bradman	Australia	1908–2001	52	80	10	6996	334	99.94	29	13	32
2	S.G. Barnes	Australia	1916–1973	13	19	2	1072	234	63.05	3	5	14
3	R.G. Pollock	South Africa	1944–present	23	41	4	2256	274	60.97	7	11	17
4	G.A. Headley	West Indies	1909–1983	22	40	4	2190	270*	60.83	10	5	14
5	H. Sutcliffe	England	1894–1978	54	84	9	4555	194	60.73	16	23	23
6	E. Paynter	England	1909–1979	20	31	5	1540	243	59.23	4	7	7
7	K.F. Barrington	England	1930–1981	82	131	15	6806	256	58.67	20	35	58
8	E.D. Weekes	West Indies	1925–2020	48	81	5	4455	207	58.61	15	19	49
9	W.R. Hammond	England	1903–1965	85	140	16	7249	336*	58.45	22	24	110
10	G.S. Sobers	West Indies	1936–present	93	160	21	8032	365*	57.78	26	30	109

== Test centuries ==
Ken Barrington made 20 Test centuries, two short of the then England record of 22 by Wally Hammond (the record is now held by Joe Root). He made hundreds against all the Test teams of his era, but less than a third of them in England, which partially accounts for his greater reputation abroad than at home. Barrington's granite-like hundreds ensured that England only lost one Test in which he made three figures, but also won eight, belying his reputation as a match-saver rather than a match-winner, and most of them by huge margins; four by an innings, one by 256 runs and three by 10, 9, and 8 wickets. Barrington twice made centuries in four successive Tests, against Pakistan and Indian in 1961–62 and Pakistan and the West Indies in 1967–68 and he was the first England batsmen to make a hundred on the six Test cricket grounds with one each at Old Trafford, Edgbaston, Headingley, Lord's, Trent Bridge and the Oval.
