= Robert Scarlett =

Robert Scarlett may refer to:

- Robert Scarlett (footballer) (born 1979), Jamaican footballer
- Robert Scarlett, 6th Baron Abinger (1876–1927), British peer
- Robert Scarlett, 2nd Baron Abinger (1794–1861), British barrister and politician
- Bob Scarlett (born 1943), Jamaican cricketer

== See also ==
- Robert Dalley-Scarlett (1887–1959), Australian organist, choirmaster, composer and musicologist
