= English cricket team in the West Indies in 1959–60 =

International cricket tour

English cricket team in West Indies in 1959–60
- Date: 21 December 1959 — 31 March 1960
- Location: West Indies
- Result: England won the 5-Test series 1–0
Teams
- West Indies: England
Captains
- Gerry Alexander: Peter May
Most runs
- GS Sobers (709) RB Kanhai (325) FMM Worrell (320): ER Dexter (526); MC Cowdrey (491); KF Barrington (420)
Most wickets
- WW Hall (22) S Ramadhin (17) CD Watson (16): FS Trueman (21); JB Statham (10)

The English cricket team in the West Indies in 1959–60 played five Test matches, eight other first-class matches and two minor games. England won the Test series by one match to nil, with the other four matches being drawn.

== England touring party ==
- Peter May (captain) (played in 3 of the 5 Tests)
- David Allen (5)
- Keith Andrew (wicket-keeper) (0)
- Ken Barrington (5)
- Colin Cowdrey (5)
- Ted Dexter (5)
- Tommy Greenhough (0)
- Ray Illingworth (5)
- Alan Moss (2)
- Jim Parks (wicket-keeper) (1)
- Geoff Pullar (5)
- Mike Smith (5)
- Brian Statham (3)
- Raman Subba Row (2)
- Roy Swetman (wicket-keeper) (4)
- Fred Trueman (5)
- Manager: Walter Robins

Following the unsuccessful tour of Australia a year earlier, the selectors opted for youth, with only May, Cowdrey, Trueman and Statham having had substantial Test experience.

== Players who represented West Indies ==
Gerry Alexander (captain) (wicket-keeper) (played in all 5 Tests)
Basil Butcher (2)
Charlie Griffith (1)
Wes Hall (5)
Conrad Hunte (5)
Rohan Kanhai (5)
Easton McMorris (4)
Seymour Nurse (1)
Sonny Ramadhin (4)
Reginald Scarlett (3)
Charran Singh (2)
Garry Sobers (5)
Joe Solomon (2)
Clyde Walcott (2)
Chester Watson (5)
Frank Worrell (4)

== Test series ==
Matches were played over six days, each of five hours.

=== 1st Test ===
6–12 January 1960 (6–day match)
Scorecard

| England | v | West Indies |
| 482 (188.4 overs); ER Dexter 136*; KF Barrington 128; S Ramadhin 3/109 (54 overs) | | 563/8d (239.4 overs); GS Sobers 226; FMM Worrell 197*; FS Trueman 4/93 (47 overs) |
| 71/0 (42 overs); G Pullar 46* |

Match drawn
Kensington Oval, Bridgetown, Barbados
Umpires: HBD Jordan and JHJ Roberts

- England won the toss and elected to bat.
- 10 January was taken as a rest day.
- DA Allen (ENG), and RO Scarlett and CD Watson (both WIN) made their Test debuts.

Centuries by Barrington (his first Test hundred) and Dexter ensured that England made a big score. Alexander took five catches. In response, West Indies were 102/3, but then a mammoth fourth wicket partnership of 399 (still the record for that wicket for West Indies against all countries) by Sobers and Worrell took them into a first innings lead. In the circumstances, Trueman's analysis was a good one. West Indies had scored at under two and a half runs per over, and by the time that they declared England only had to bat for 140 minutes in their second innings. Allen for England, and Scarlett and Watson for West Indies, made their Test debuts. Statham was unfit, Moss playing in his stead.

=== 2nd Test ===
28 January–3 February 1960 (6–day match)
Scorecard

| England | v | West Indies |
| 382 (143.5 overs); KF Barrington 121; MJK Smith 108; S Ramadhin 3/61 (35 overs) | | 112 (68.3 overs); FCM Alexander 28; FS Trueman 5/35 (21 overs); JB Statham 3/42 (19.3 overs) |
| 230/9d (90.4 overs); KF Barrington 49; WW Hall 3/50 (23.4 overs) | | 244 (134.5 overs); RB Kanhai 110; DA Allen 3/57 (31 overs) |

England won by 256 runs
Queen's Park Oval, Port of Spain, Trinidad
Umpires: EN Lee Kow and EL Lloyd

- England won the toss and elected to bat.
- 31 January was taken as a rest day.
- CK Singh (WIN) made his Test debut.

England lost three early wickets, but centuries by Barrington and Smith and 77 by Dexter ensured a competitive score, even though none of the last five batsmen managed more than 10. By the end of day two West Indies had reached 22/0 in reply. The third day's play was severely curtailed by a riot, but it was still the decisive day of the match, for West Indies slumped to 98/8. When their innings ended the next morning, Trueman had figures of 5/35 and Statham 3/42. West Indies' cause had not been helped by the other two wickets falling to run outs. Despite a first innings lead of 270, May did not enforce the follow-on. England in turn found batting difficult, at one point being 133/7, before useful contributions from Illingworth (41) and Trueman (37 made in 30 minutes) enabled them to declare on day five, setting West Indies an improbable 501 to win. A partnership between Hunte and Kanhai of 78 for the second wicket gave West Indies some hope of avoiding defeat, but Hunte was out for 47 before close of play, when West Indies were 134/2. On the final day, they could manage only another 110 runs before being all out. Only Kanhai, who batted for 378 minutes, offered the prolonged resistance that was needed. Singh made his Test debut for the West Indies.

The riot on the third day began soon after tea when Singh was adjudged run out, and prevented any further play that day. There was a crowd of almost 30,000, a record for any sporting event in the West Indies. A few spectators started throwing bottles onto the outfield. Many others followed their lead, after which many of the crowd came onto the field and a riot developed. The England players were escorted from the field, though the rioters had shown no hostility towards them.

=== 3rd Test ===
17–23 February 1960 (6–day match)
Scorecard

| England | v | West Indies |
| 277 (104.2 overs); MC Cowdrey 114; WW Hall 7/69 (31.2 overs) | | 353 (156.1 overs); GS Sobers 147; JB Statham 3/76 (32.1 overs) |
| 305 (123.3 overs); MC Cowdrey 97; G Pullar 66; CD Watson 4/62 (37 overs); S Ramadhin 3/38 (28.3 overs) | | 175/6 (63 overs); RB Kanhai 57; FS Trueman 4/54 (18 overs) |

Match drawn
Sabina Park, Kingston, Jamaica
Umpires: P Burke and EN Lee Kow

- England won the toss and elected to bat.
- 21 February was taken as a rest day.
- SM Nurse (WIN) made his Test debut.

Apart from Cowdrey, who having opened the England innings was ninth out, none of the England batsmen made more than 30 in the first innings. During his Test career, Hall never improved on his figures in this innings. By the end of the second day West Indies had reached 81/2 in their reply. Next day, they lost only McMorris, retired hurt, as they closed at 291/2, already with a first innings lead. Sobers was on 142 and Nurse, in his first Test, on 46. However Sobers' early dismissal next morning triggered a collapse, and although McMorris was fit to resume his innings the West Indies led by only 76. McMorris made 73 and Nurse 70. Cowdrey and Pullar more than wiped off the deficit, taking their first wicket stand to 177 before both were out at that score, Cowdrey narrowly missing his second century of the match. The innings then fell away, and with one day to go England, at 280/9, led by only 204. However next morning Allen and Statham held out for 45 minutes, adding 25 runs, and West Indies needed 230 in 245 minutes if they were to win. Hunte began in attacking fashion, scoring 40 out of 48 in an hour before he was the second man out. Wisden felt the turning-point came when Sobers was run out when looking dangerous, to make the score 86/3. West Indies continued to chase the target, but scoring was never easy. At tea 115 were still needed in 90 minutes. When Kanhai was out at 152/6 West Indies gave up the chase and England tried to get the four remaining wickets in the forty-five minutes that were left. May refused to allow Kanhai a runner near the end, when he had developed cramp. In fact Kanhai was entitled to a runner under the laws. May apologised to Kanhai and Alexander after the match for his mistake. The umpires and Alexander himself had also been unsure about the position.

During the first day part of a tin roof collapsed from the weight of spectators standing on it, and several people were injured.

=== 4th Test ===
9–15 March 1960 (6–day match)
Scorecard

| England | v | West Indies |
| 295 (119.2 overs); MC Cowdrey 65; WW Hall 6/90 (30.2 overs) | | 402/8d (172 overs); GS Sobers 145; DA Allen 3/75 (42 overs) |
| 334/8 (149.2 overs); ER Dexter 110; R Subba Row 100; FMM Worrell 4/49 (31 overs) |

Match drawn
Bourda, Georgetown, British Guiana
Umpires: FCP Kippins and EN Lee Kow

- England won the toss and elected to bat.
- 13 March was taken as a rest day.

This Test was similar to the previous one in many respects. Again Cowdrey top-scored in England's first innings and Hall was the most successful bowler. Again Sobers scored a century for West Indies, who once more secured a sizeable first innings lead but scored too slowly to have enough time to press home their advantage.

There were a number of changes in the sides from the previous Test. With May too ill to play and being forced to fly home, Cowdrey took over the England captaincy and Subba Row came into the side. West Indies were without Ramadhin because of shoulder trouble. Lance Gibbs was the intended replacement, but he had damaged his spinning finger, so that Scarlett was retained and Singh was included as a second spinner. Walcott, who had supposedly retired from Test cricket, was recalled, replacing Nurse. Worrell, who had not been fit for the previous Test, returned at the expense of Solomon.

After a solid start on a rain-shortened first day, when they reached 152/2, England fell away on the second. Only 55 from Allen enabled them to make as many as 295 in the face of Hall's fast bowling. Alexander took four catches. Though West Indies achieved a substantial first innings lead, thanks largely to Sobers, they scored at not much over two runs an over. Between them, the two English off-spinners, Allen and Illingworth, bowled 85 overs for only 147 runs. Thanks to centuries by Dexter and Subba Row (his first in Tests), England had no difficulty in saving the game, reaching 320/3 at one point before there was a flurry of wickets when it was too late to matter.

=== 5th Test ===
25–31 March 1960 (6–day match)
Scorecard

| England | v | West Indies |
| 393 (123.2 overs); MC Cowdrey 119; S Ramadhin 4/73 (34 overs) | | 338/8d (119.3 overs); GS Sobers 92; DA Allen 2/61 (24 overs) |
| 350/7d (124 overs); JM Parks 101*; MJK Smith 96; GS Sobers 2/84 (29 overs) | | 209/5 (52 overs); FMM Worrell 61; R Illingworth 2/53 (16 overs) |

Match drawn
Queen's Park Oval, Port of Spain, Trinidad
Umpires: HBD Jordan and FCP Kippins

- England won the toss and elected to bat.
- 27 March was taken as a rest day.
- CC Griffith (WIN) made his Test debut.

Statham had flown home because his son was seriously ill, and Moss replaced him in the side. Swetman, the wicket-keeper, had managed only 58 runs in the first four Tests, and was dropped. With Andrew, the other wicket-keeper in the party, having few pretensions as a batsman, Parks – who had been coaching in Trinidad – took Swetman's place. His only previous Test appearance had been as a specialist batsman in 1954. West Indies included a third fast bowler, Griffith, making his Test debut. With Ramadhin fit again, Scarlett and Singh were omitted.

As in the four previous matches, England won the toss and batted first. For the third Test in succession, Cowdrey and Sobers top-scored in their respective sides' first innings. The first day ended with England 256/3, Cowdrey and Dexter having added 191 in 225 minutes for the third wicket before Dexter was out for 76. Next day, though Barrington took his score to 69 and Parks made 43, England only added another 137 for their last seven wickets. In reply, West Indies were at one point 190/2, thanks to Sobers and Walcott (53), but declined to 230/6. Hunte, who had retired hurt when the total was 24, returned to make 72* by the time that West Indies declared 55 behind in the hope of forcing a win. With England declining to 148/6 when Dexter was run out for 47, they seemed likely do so. However Smith and Parks then put on 197, which remains England's seventh wicket record partnership against all countries. Parks' hundred was his first in Tests. Cowdrey's declaration left West Indies a notional 406 to win at 140 an hour. Though they had no hope of winning, West Indies managed to score at four runs an over in their second innings, a better rate than they had generally managed in the series.

Alexander finished with 23 dismissals, which equalled the then world record for a Test series.

== Other first-class matches ==
Won 3, lost 1, drew 4.

Beat Windward Islands by 10 wickets
Lost to Barbados by 10 wickets
Beat Trinidad by 6 wickets
Beat Trinidad by 10 wickets
Drew with Jamaica
Drew with Leeward Islands
Drew with British Guiana
Drew with Berbice

== Controversies ==
Though the tour was less acrimonious than that made by England six years earlier, according to Wisden there were nevertheless still some contentious issues, notably those of slow over rates, excessive short-pitched bowling and throwing. England were the main culprits in wasting time; having won the second Test they set out to avoid defeat in the remaining three matches. Short-pitched bowling was overdone, especially by the West Indian fast bowlers Hall and Watson. Two bowlers playing regularly for West Indies in the Tests had actions that Wisden considered to be suspect.
