= Doug Slade =

English cricketer

Personal information
- Born: 24 August 1940 (age 86); Feckenham, Redditch, Worcestershire, England
- Batting: Right-handed
- Bowling: Slow left-arm orthodox

Domestic team information
- Years: Team
- 1958–1971: Worcestershire
- 1973–1978: Shropshire

Career statistics
| Competition | First-class | List A |
|---|---|---|
| Matches | 280 | 45 |
| Runs scored | 5,275 | 452 |
| Batting average | 18.06 | 14.12 |
| 100s/50s | 1/9 | 0/1 |
| Top score | 125 | 54 |
| Balls bowled | 34,340 | 978 |
| Wickets | 502 | 21 |
| Bowling average | 23.47 | 25.19 |
| 5 wickets in innings | 14 | 0 |
| 10 wickets in match | 1 | 0 |
| Best bowling | 7/47 | 3/21 |
| Catches/stumpings | 193/0 | 11/0 |
- Source: Cricinfo, 28 November 2020

Douglas Norman Frank Slade (born 24 August 1940) is a former English cricketer who played for Worcestershire and Shropshire.

Slade scored 5275 runs in first-class cricket at an average of 18.06 and took 502 wickets at 23.47 with his slow left-arm bowling in a career with Worcestershire that lasted from 1958 until 1971.

Slade came to prominence in his first season by taking 52 wickets at 17.11. In 1960 he took 97 wickets at 19.83, including 7 for 47 and 4 for 32 against Middlesex at Lord's. Also a useful batsman in the lower order, Slade appeared to have a chance of a significant career. However, the arrival of another left-arm spinner, Norman Gifford, in the Worcestershire team in 1960 began to restrict Slade's opportunities. He played only twice in 1961 and when he did make the First Eleven, he found himself frequently used as the sixth bowler. The registration of Basil D'Oliveira in 1964 further restricted Slade's prospects.

After taking 71 wickets in 1963, he became a bit player in the county team. However, he toured Pakistan with the Commonwealth XI in 1963–64, playing in all three matches against Pakistan and taking more wickets than any other Commonwealth XI bowler. He was an important member of Worcestershire's Championship-winning sides of 1964 and 1965, though in each season he played only a handful of games. He made 634 runs in 1969, scoring 125 against Leicestershire at Grace Road after going in at number three as nightwatchman.

Slade left New Road after the 1971 season and played with considerable success for Shropshire between 1973 and 1978 and in the Birmingham League. He appeared in Shropshire's first (and of 2020 only) Minor Counties Championship win, against Staffordshire at London Road, Shrewsbury in August of 1973 when he sustained a broken thumb on his bowling hand during first innings but returned to bat in the second when he was bowled out for two; however he ended play having achieved 16 overs (including 15 maidens) and taken four wickets for one run. He went on to captain Shropshire in 1977-78, and in the same period played at club level for West Bromwich Dartmouth.

He later served on the Worcestershire committee. He worked as a salesman selling central reservation barriers for motorways, and also helped to run the family farm.
