= Krish Reddy =

South African cricket historian and administrator

Krish Reddy was a South African cricket historian, administrator, statistician, chief selector and author. His role basically established the fundamental needs of black African players as he closely associated with them right from scratch at the grassroots level, coincidentally when processes related to the unification of cricket went on floors beginning in 1991 across all parts of South Africa.

== Career ==
He was widely acknowledged as one of the early pioneers for doing the basic patchwork in restoring the sporting history of black cricketers in South Africa, whose legacy largely went under the radar during the peak of the apartheid era. He worked as a key statistician playing an instrumental role in managing the database of players especially focusing on the black players. According to the sources, he reportedly spent a larger chunk of his lifetime towards the wellbeing of the black cricket in South Africa.

He also wrote and published several books as an author, highlighting the plight and struggles of black African players in South Africa. Furthermore, he also wrote several essays and articles in national newspapers and magazines covering the subject matter revolving around the plight of black cricketers in South Africa. One of his prominent books, titled The Other Side, reflected on the important revelations about black cricket in the region of Natal. His comprehensive statistical analysis of the former English cricketer Basil D'Oliveira was notably included as an appendix to Peter Oborne's book titled D'Oliveira: Cricket and Conspiracy: The Untold Story. He also joined hands with prominent stalwarts in South Africa including the likes of Ashwin Desai, Vishnu Padayachee and Goolam Vahed in an ambitious collaboration in co-authoring a book titled Black in Whites and it was published in 2002.

He also received the prestigious honor of being named one of the historians on a panel of experts who lined up to pick Wisden's five cricketers of the century. He also went onto serve in the executive board of the KwaZulu-Natal (KZN) Cricket Union in a respectable capacity for a longer tenure and he also had a brief stint as a selector in the KwaZulu-Natal area.

== Death ==
He died at the age of 77 in October 2022 after confronting heart related ailments.
