= Charran Singh =

Trinidadian cricketer

Personal information
- Full name: Charran Kamkaran Singh
- Born: 27 November 1935; San Juan, Trinidad and Tobago
- Died: 19 November 2015 (aged 79); San Juan, Trinidad and Tobago]
- Batting: Left-handed
- Bowling: Slow left-arm orthodox
- Role: Bowler

International information
- National side: West Indies
- Test debut: 28 January 1960 v England
- Last Test: 9 March 1960 v England

Career statistics
Competition	Test	First-class
Matches	2	11
Runs scored	11	102
Batting average	3.66	8.50
100s/50s	0/0	0/0
Top score	11	29*
Balls bowled	506	3,347
Wickets	5	48
Bowling average	33.20	23.93
5 wickets in innings	0	3
10 wickets in match	0	0
Best bowling	2/28	7/38
Catches/stumpings	2/–	7/–
- Source: CricInfo, 10 September 2022

Charran Kamkaran Singh (27 November 1935 - 19 November 2015) was a West Indian cricketer who played in two Test matches in 1960.

In his debut Test at Queen's Park Oval, Singh's run out dismissal was the trigger for the crowd to start a riot.

Singh was a left-arm orthodox spinner who played for Trinidad from 1959–60 to 1961–62. In his first match he took 5 for 69 in the first innings against Jamaica; in his second, later that season, he took 5 for 57 in the first innings against the touring MCC. He was picked for the next Test, the Second, replacing Reg Scarlett. He took 3 wickets in the match, but West Indies lost, and he made way for Scarlett in the Third Test team. He replaced Sonny Ramadhin in the Fourth Test team, and took 2 wickets, but lost his place to Ramadhin for the Fifth Test.

He took 7 for 38 against Barbados in 1960–61, but played no further Tests.
