= Ivan D'Oliveira =

South African cricketer (born 1941)

Ivan D'Oliveira (born 19 March 1941) is a South African former cricketer who played first-class cricket for Leicestershire. Born at Cape Town in South Africa, he is the brother of Basil D'Oliveira and the uncle of Damian D'Oliveira.

Although D'Oliveira only made one first-class appearance in English county cricket, he was a heavy scorer in lower-league South African cricket and played a number of games for Leicestershire's 2nd XI. In his only first-class match, a 1967 fixture against Cambridge University at Fenner's, he recorded a duck in his only innings.
