= Chester Watson (cricketer) =

Jamaican cricketer (born 1938)

Personal information
- Full name: Chester Donald Watson
- Born: 1 July 1938 (age 88); Negril, Westmoreland, Jamaica
- Batting: Right-handed
- Bowling: Right-arm fast

International information
- National side: West Indies (1960 - 1962)
- Test debut (cap 108): 6 January 1960 v England
- Last Test: 16 February 1962 v India

Career statistics
Competition	Tests	First-class
Matches	7	32
Runs scored	12	198
Batting average	2.39	7.61
100s/50s	0/0	0/1
Top score	5	50
Balls bowled	1,458	5,061
Wickets	19	85
Bowling average	38.10	32.07
5 wickets in innings	0	1
10 wickets in match	0	0
Best bowling	4/62	6/33
Catches/stumpings	1/–	14/–
- Source: ESPNcricinfo, 17 March 2019

Chester Donald Watson (born 1 July 1938) is a former Jamaican cricketer. Watson played seven Tests for the West Indies in the late 1950s and early 1960s.

== Career ==
A tall right-arm fast bowler, Watson played first-class cricket for Jamaica from 1958 to 1962. During the England tour of the West Indies in 1959–60, when he opened the West Indies bowling with Wes Hall, the two were accused by some of the English of intimidatory bowling. The English batsman Ken Barrington was hit on the elbow by a Watson bouncer during the series and others had near misses, but the West Indies' champion all-rounder Garry Sobers later claimed this was more due to the English batsmen being unaccustomed to West Indian pitches than intimidatory bowling. Watson toured Australia with the West Indies in 1960–61. His best first-class bowling figures were 6 for 33 for Jamaica against Trinidad in October 1959.

Watson played as the professional for Church in the Lancashire League from 1961 to 1967, and from 1968 to 1971 he played as the professional for Royton in the Central Lancashire League. In 1962 he took 117 wickets at an average of 7.58 to lead the Lancashire League averages and take Church to the championship.

In September and October 1962, Watson toured East Africa, Rhodesia and Malaya with a Commonwealth XI cricket team. He then spent a season in India, representing Delhi in the Ranji Trophy and North Zone in the Duleep Trophy. He was one of four West Indian fast bowlers who played a season of domestic cricket in India in 1962–63 in order to give Indian batsmen more experience of playing fast bowling. He toured Pakistan with the Commonwealth XI in 1963–64.

== Personal life ==
While living in England, Watson married a woman from Ribchester, and studied accountancy during the Lancashire winters. When he returned to Jamaica he took up a position as a company secretary. He served as chairman of the Jamaican Board of Control for Cricket.

== Sources ==
- Sobers, G. (1988) Sobers: Twenty years at the top, Pan Books: London. ISBN 0 330 30868 8.
