= Brett D'Oliveira =

English cricketer

Personal information
- Full name: Brett Louis D'Oliveira
- Born: 28 February 1992 (age 34); Worcester, Worcestershire, England
- Height: 5 ft 9 in (1.75 m)
- Batting: Right-handed
- Bowling: Right-arm leg break
- Relatives: Damian D'Oliveira (father); Basil D'Oliveira (grandfather)

Domestic team information
- Years: Team
- 2011–present: Worcestershire (squad no. 15)
- 2021: Birmingham Phoenix
- FC debut: 8 August 2012 Worcestershire v Warwickshire
- LA debut: 29 August 2011 Worcestershire v Yorkshire

Career statistics
Competition	FC	LA	T20
Matches	140	92	169
Runs scored	6,948	1,967	2,795
Batting average	32.46	27.70	23.48
100s/50s	14/32	3/9	0/15
Top score	202*	138	79
Balls bowled	8,511	3,102	1,955
Wickets	86	72	84
Bowling average	57.87	39.05	30.48
5 wickets in innings	2	0	0
10 wickets in match	0	0	0
Best bowling	7/92	3/8	4/11
Catches/stumpings	49/–	36/–	53/–
- Source: ESPNcricinfo, 27 September 2026

Brett Louis D'Oliveira (born 28 February 1992) is an English cricketer, a right-handed batsman and leg spin bowler who currently plays for Worcestershire. He made his debut for Worcestershire against Yorkshire in a List A match in August 2011. D'Oliveira signed a new, three-year, contract with Worcestershire in July 2016. D'Oliveira had been playing cricket for Worcestershire since under-13 level.

== Personal life ==
Brett D'Oliveira is the son of Damian D'Oliveira who had previously played first-class cricket for Worcestershire and was their Academy director. His grandfather was the former England and Worcestershire batsman Basil D'Oliveira. On making his debut, he became the third generation of his family to play for Worcestershire.

== County career ==
D'Oliveira made his debut for Worcestershire on 29 August 2011 in a Pro40 match against Yorkshire. D'Oliveira did not bat as Worcestershire made 230-7 from their 40 overs. In the Yorkshire innings he bowled 6 overs for 40 runs, taking one wicket, that of youngster Joe Root who was caught by Daryl Mitchell for 62. Worcestershire lost the game by 6 wickets. He made his first-class debut for Worcestershire against Warwickshire at Birmingham on 8 August 2012.

Originally rated as a leg-spinner, he was promoted to open the batting at the end of the 2015 season, with enough success to earn an extended run in 2016. Suddenly his batting improved with a series of high scores, including an unbeaten double century against Glamorgan. Despite only just having achieved a regular place in his county side, he was called up to play for England Lions. In 2018 and 2019 he captained his county in many limited-overs matches in the absence of designated limited-overs captain Moeen Ali. In 2022, D'Oliviera was appointed as the Worcestershire captain. In his first two matches as captain in the County Championship, D'Oliviera scored two centuries.
