= Commonwealth XI cricket team in Pakistan in 1963–64 =

A Commonwealth XI cricket team of 14 players visited Pakistan between early November and mid-December 1963, playing six first-class matches including three five-day matches against Pakistan. The Commonwealth XI won the match against a Punjab Governor's XI, and the other five matches ended in draws.

== Team ==
The team consisted of six players from England, five from the West Indies, and one each from Australia, Pakistan and South Africa.

- Peter Richardson (captain, England)
- Bill Alley (Australia)
- Keith Andrew (England)
- Basil Butcher (West Indies)
- Basil D'Oliveira (South Africa)
- Tom Graveney (England)
- Charlie Griffith (West Indies)
- Rohan Kanhai (West Indies)
- Khalid Ibadulla (Pakistan)
- John Murray (England)
- Seymour Nurse (West Indies)
- Ken Palmer (England)
- Doug Slade (England)
- Chester Watson (West Indies)

The team was managed by Alf Gover.

== The tour ==
There were six first-class matches. Individual centuries and five-wicket hauls are included in the scores below.

- BCCP XI v Commonwealth XI, Niaz Stadium, Hyderabad, 8, 9, 10 November 1963. BCCP XI 293 for 8 dec. and 147 for 4 dec; Commonwealth XI 293 and 36 for 1. Drawn.
- Pakistan v Commonwealth XI, National Stadium, Karachi, 15, 16, 17, 19, 20 November 1963. Commonwealth XI 442 (Kanhai 129) and 452 for 8; Pakistan 464 (Mushtaq Mohammad 178). Drawn.
- President's XI v Commonwealth XI, Pindi Club Ground, Rawalpindi, 22, 23, 24 November 1963. President's XI 205 for 9 dec. and 274 for 7 dec.; Commonwealth XI 281 for 6 dec. and 70 for 6. Drawn.
- Punjab Governor's XI v Commonwealth XI, Bohranwala Ground, Lyallpur, 25, 26, 27 November 1963. Punjab Governor's XI 179 and 167; Commonwealth XI 246 (D'Oliveira 115) and 102 for no wickets. Commonwealth XI won by 10 wickets.
- Pakistan v Commonwealth XI, Lahore Stadium, Lahore, 29, 30 November, 1, 3, 4 December 1963. Commonwealth XI 630 for 9 dec. (Kanhai 161, Graveney 164) and 250 for 2 (Graveney 107 not out, Ibadulla 103 not out); Pakistan 580 (Mushtaq Mohammad 159; Slade 6 for 126). Drawn.
- Pakistan v Commonwealth XI, Dacca Stadium, Dacca, 7, 8, 9, 10, 11 December 1963. Commonwealth XI 234 and 344 for 6 dec. (Nurse 126 not out); Pakistan 318 (Saeed Ahmed 100) and 223 for 4. Drawn.

Batsmen dominated on the slow, bare pitches. Eleven of the 14 Commonwealth XI players averaged 30 or more with the bat. Graveney was the leading run-scorer, with 500 runs at an average of 100. Only three of the bowlers took more than seven wickets: Slade took 21 wickets at an average of 22.33, Griffith took 15 at 28.93, and D'Oliveira took 13 at 30.08.
