= Damian D'Oliveira =

English cricketer

Personal information
- Full name: Damian Basil D'Oliveira
- Born: 19 October 1960; Signal Hill, Cape Town, South Africa
- Died: 29 June 2014 (aged 53); Worcester, Worcestershire, England
- Batting: Right-handed
- Bowling: Right-arm medium, right-arm off break
- Relatives: Basil D'Oliveira (father); Brett D'Oliveira (son); Ivan D'Oliveira (uncle)

Domestic team information
- Years: Team
- 1982–1995: Worcestershire

Career statistics
Competition	First-class	List A
Matches	234	265
Runs scored	9,504	4,822
Batting average	27.62	22.96
100s/50s	10/46	1/19
Top score	237	103
Balls bowled	4,489	1,044
Wickets	55	28
Bowling average	45.09	27.07
5 wickets in innings	0	0
10 wickets in match	0	0
Best bowling	4/68	3/12
Catches/stumpings	205/–	68/–
- Source: ESPNcricinfo, 19 July 2015

Damian Basil D'Oliveira (19 October 1960 – 29 June 2014) was a South African-born English cricketer who played first-class cricket for Worcestershire, and was the Academy Director of Worcestershire County Cricket Club.

Playing for Worcestershire between 1982 and 1995, during his career he scored more than 9,000 first-class runs, with a best single-innings total of 237. He helped Worcestershire to the County Championship in 1988 and 1989, the Benson and Hedges Cup in 1991, and the NatWest Trophy in 1994.

D'Oliveira was married and had three children. His father, Basil, played first-class cricket for Worcestershire from 1964 to 1980, and England from 1966 to 1972. His uncle, Ivan, also played first-class cricket for Leicestershire in 1967. His son, Brett, currently plays for Worcestershire.

After a two-and-a-half-year battle, D'Oliveira died of cancer in the early hours of 29 June 2014.
