= Bob Scarlett =

Jamaican cricketer (born 1943)

Personal information
- Full name: Robert Lucian Scarlett
- Born: 23 May 1943 (age 83); Port Maria, St Mary, Jamaica
- Batting: Right-handed
- Bowling: Slow left-arm orthodox
- Relatives: Reg Scarlett (brother)

Domestic team information
- Years: Team
- 1963-64: Jamaica

Career statistics
| Competition | First-class |
|---|---|
| Matches | 4 |
| Runs scored | 44 |
| Batting average | 7.33 |
| 100s/50s | 0/0 |
| Top score | 24 |
| Balls bowled | 828 |
| Wickets | 9 |
| Bowling average | 48.77 |
| 5 wickets in innings | 1 |
| 10 wickets in match | 0 |
| Best bowling | 5/95 |
| Catches/stumpings | 0/– |
- Source: Cricinfo, 12 October 2019

Robert Lucian Scarlett (born 23 May 1943) is a former Jamaican cricketer who played four first-class matches for Jamaica in the 1963-64 season.

A slow left-arm orthodox spin bowler and lower-order batsman, Bob Scarlett's best figures were 5 for 95 against Barbados in his third match.

Scarlett's elder brother Reg played Test cricket for West Indies in the 1959-60 season.
