= Benefit year =

Year in which UK National Insurance contributions are paid

A benefit year is a 12-month period in which individuals are eligible to collect compensation, typically related to insurance policies or unemployment benefits.

In the United Kingdom, the Jobseeker's Allowance for individuals who have contributed to National Insurance is paid during a benefit year that runs from the first Sunday in January until the Saturday before the first Sunday in January. It is distinct from the UK tax year which runs from 6 April to 5 April each year.
