= Reginald Scarlett =

Jamaican cricketer (1934–2019)

Reg Scarlett
Personal information
- Full name: Reginald Osmond Scarlett
- Born: 15 August 1934; Port Maria, St Mary, Jamaica
- Died: 14 August 2019 (aged 84); England
- Batting: Right-handed
- Bowling: Right-arm offbreak
- Relatives: Bob Scarlett (brother)

International information
- National side: West Indies

Domestic team information
- Years: Team
- 1951/52–1959/60: Jamaica

Career statistics
Competition	Tests	First-class
Matches	3	17
Runs scored	54	477
Batting average	18.00	23.85
100s/50s	0/0	0/2
Top score	29*	72*
Balls bowled	804	3,911
Wickets	2	48
Bowling average	104.50	34.12
5 wickets in innings	0	2
10 wickets in match	0	0
Best bowling	1/46	5/69
Catches/stumpings	2/–	6/–
- Source: Cricinfo

Reginald Osmond Scarlett (15 August 1934 – 14 August 2019) was a West Indian cricketer who played in three Tests in 1960.

Reg Scarlett was a strongly-built lower-order batsman and off-spinner (a "mountainous figure of a man" according to Christopher Martin-Jenkins) who played first-class cricket for Jamaica from 1951–52 to 1959–60. In his first eight games to the end of the 1957–58 season he made 150 runs at 13.63 and took 20 wickets at 34.25. In each of Jamaica's two matches against the Marylebone Cricket Club (MCC) in 1953/54 he took four wickets in the first innings. He struck more productive form in mid-1958, taking 14 wickets in two matches against Barbados.

In 1959–60 Scarlett had figures of 5 for 69 against Trinidad and 3 for 107 against British Guiana, and was selected for the First Test against England. He failed in the Test and was replaced by Charran Singh, but scored 72 not out and 59 for Jamaica against the MCC (his only first-class fifties) and took three wickets, and returned to the Test team for the Third and Fourth Tests, but again achieved little.

Scarlett retired from first-class cricket after the series and moved to England, where he spent many years coaching. He established the Haringey Cricket College in Tottenham in North London, which organised cricket training and matches for local boys, several of whom became first-class players. He later became the West Indies Cricket Board's director of coaching.

He co-authored the book 100 Great West Indian Cricketers (1987) with Bridgette Lawrence. He died on August 14, 2019, the day before his 85th birthday.

Scarlett's younger brother Bob played a few games for Jamaica in the 1960s.
