= Jackie Roberts (umpire) =

Barbadian cricket umpire (1912–1991)

Personal information
- Full name: James Henry Julian Roberts
- Born: 1912; Barbados
- Died: 17 July 1991 (aged 78–79); Barbados

Umpiring information
- Tests umpired: 2 (1960–1962)
- Source: Cricinfo, 15 July 2013

Jackie Roberts (1912 – 17 July 1991) was a Barbadian cricket umpire. He stood in two Test matches between 1960 and 1962.

== See also ==
- List of Test cricket umpires
