= Basil D'Oliveira =

English cricketer (1931–2011)

Basil D'Oliveira CBE OIS
Personal information
- Full name: Basil Lewis D'Oliveira
- Born: 4 October 1931; Cape Town, Cape Province, Union of South Africa
- Died: 19 November 2011 (aged 80); Worcester, Worcestershire, England
- Nickname: Dolly
- Batting: Right-handed
- Bowling: Right arm medium
- Role: All-rounder
- Relatives: Damian D'Oliveira (son); Brett D'Oliveira (grandson); Ivan D'Oliveira (brother)

International information
- National side: England
- Test debut (cap 432): 16 June 1966 v West Indies
- Last Test: 10 August 1972 v Australia
- ODI debut (cap 3): 5 January 1971 v Australia
- Last ODI: 28 August 1972 v Australia

Domestic team information
- Years: Team
- 1964–1980: Worcestershire
- 1972/73–1973/74: Eastern Province

Career statistics
Competition	Test	ODI	FC	LA
Matches	44	4	367	187
Runs scored	2,484	30	19,490	3,770
Batting average	40.06	10.00	40.26	24.96
100s/50s	5/15	0/0	45/101	2/19
Top score	158	17	227	102
Balls bowled	5,706	204	41,079	7,892
Wickets	47	3	551	190
Bowling average	39.55	46.66	27.45	23.56
5 wickets in innings	0	0	17	1
10 wickets in match	0	0	2	0
Best bowling	3/46	1/19	6/29	5/26
Catches/stumpings	29/–	1/–	215/–	44/–
- Source: Cricinfo, 10 April 2008

Basil Lewis D'Oliveira CBE OIS (4 October 1931 – 19 November 2011) was an England international cricketer of South African Cape Coloured background, whose potential selection by England for the scheduled 1968–69 tour of apartheid-era South Africa caused the D'Oliveira affair.

Nicknamed "Dolly", D'Oliveira played county cricket for Worcestershire from 1964 to 1980, and appeared for England in 44 Test matches and four One Day Internationals between 1966 and 1972.

== Early life ==
D'Oliveira was born into a religious Catholic family in Signal Hill, Cape Town; he believed that his family probably came from Madeira, not Malaya or Indonesia like most of his community and this explained his Portuguese surname. As a boy he visited the Newlands Cricket Ground in Cape Town and climbed the trees outside to watch the games.

He captained South Africa's national non-white cricket team, and also played football for the non-white national side.

== Career ==
With the support of John Arlott, and the members and supporters of St Augustine's Cricket Club in Cape Town, he emigrated to England in 1960, where the journalist John Kay found him a place in the Central Lancashire League team of Middleton. D'Oliveira noted his surprise at seeing white people doing menial work, and waiting on him in restaurants. He toured Pakistan with a Commonwealth XI in 1963–64, scoring his first century in first-class cricket. He joined the first-class county team Worcestershire County Cricket Club in 1964, and became a British citizen.

In 1966, he was selected for the England cricket team as an all-rounder to face the West Indians in the second Test. He made a solid debut, scoring 27 before being run out, and returning bowling figures of 1 for 24 and 1 for 46 in 39 overs. In the third Test he scored 76 and 54, while capturing 2 wickets for 51 and 2 for 77 at Trent Bridge; though the West Indies cantered to a 139-run victory. He contributed a fighting 88 in the fourth Test at Headingley, although England once again lost, by an innings and 55 runs. D'Oliveira was quietly efficient in the final Test as England turned the tables on the West Indies, winning by an innings and 34 runs to lose the series 3–1. Against India he hit 109 in the first Test where England won by six wickets and went on to win the series 3–0. Facing Pakistan he hit fifties in both innings of the first Test, in a series that England won 2–0. He was one of the Wisden Cricketers of the Year for 1967.

In the away series against the West Indies, early in 1968, D'Oliveira was not at his best in the five matches. He scored only 137 runs at an average of 27.4. He bowled extensively, but picked up only three wickets, even though he was economical. Once back in England, it was time for a five-Test Ashes series. The Aussies crushed England by 159 runs in the first Test as England crumbled in their second innings, despite D'Oliveira's top scoring effort of 87 not out. He was then dropped for the subsequent three Tests. He was recalled for the final Test at the Oval, and 158 runs in the first innings against Australia seemed to have guaranteed his place in the side to play the 1968–69 Test series in South Africa. He was left out of the touring party under the pretext that his bowling would not be effective in his native country. However, he was later called up as a replacement and the tour was cancelled.

He was selected in June 1969 to face the West Indies, this time in a three-Test series. He followed that with a three-match series against New Zealand and then a seven-Test Ashes series in Australia, in which he scored 369 runs at an average of 36.9, including 117 in the fifth Test at the MCG.

England then went to New Zealand for two Tests, with D'Oliveira scoring 100 in the first one and 58 and five in the second. Pakistan next visited England in 1971, and D'Oliveira enjoyed a fine series with the bat, making 241 runs at an average of 60.25. He was below par in the three-Test series against India that followed, but was in better form for the visit of Australia in June 1972.

D'Oliveira completed his playing career having played 41 Tests. He scored 2484 runs at an average of 40.06, with five centuries and 15 fifties. He also captured 47 wickets at 39.55. After his retirement from first-class cricket D'Oliveira was the Worcestershire coach from 1980 to 1990.

== Playing style and personality ==
D'Oliveira was a successful batsman with a low backlift and powerful strokes. He was also a tough competitor. When he toured Australia in 1970–71 on the night after they won the series 2–0 he pushed his forefinger into the chest of every Australian he met, saying "We stuffed you."

Wanting to play international cricket, D'Oliveira was somewhat cagey about his date of birth. After his death, journalist Pat Murphy with whom he collaborated on his autobiography stated:

Basil had to lie about his age because he thought if they realised how old he was they would not pick him for England. So he came down from born in 1935 at that time, solidifying his place in the team as 1933 born and when I wrote his book in 1980 he finally conceded he was born in 1928. So by my calculation he was 38 when he first played for England in 1966 and 83 when he died.

== D'Oliveira affair ==
South African cricket officials in 1968 realised that the inclusion of D'Oliveira in the England squad would lead to the cancellation of the tour, and probable exclusion of South Africa from Test cricket. This exerted pressure on the Marylebone Cricket Club (MCC) hierarchy leading to the decision not to pick him, which was felt by opponents of apartheid to be a way of keeping cricket links with South Africa open. There was dissent in the press to this course of events and when Warwickshire's Tom Cartwright was ruled out because of injury, D'Oliveira was called up into the squad. Prime Minister of South Africa B. J. Vorster had already made it clear that D'Oliveira's inclusion was not acceptable, and despite many negotiations the tour was cancelled; South Africa was excluded from Test cricket for 22 years. This was seen as a watershed in the sporting boycott of apartheid South Africa.

The D'Oliveira Affair had a massive impact in turning international opinion against the apartheid regime in South Africa. It prompted changes in South African sport and eventually in society. The events of 1968 were dramatized on BBC Radio 4 in April 2009 in a play by Christopher Douglas entitled Dolly.

== Legacy ==
In 2000, he was nominated as one of 10 South African cricketers of the century, despite not having played for South Africa. In 2004, a perpetual trophy was struck for the Test series between England and South Africa, and named the Basil D'Oliveira Trophy. In 2005, he was appointed a Commander of the Order of the British Empire (CBE) in the 2005 Queen's Birthday Honours. In the same year, a stand at New Road, Worcester, was named in his honour.

In 1980, after the end of his playing career, he wrote an autobiography with the BBC's Pat Murphy, titled Time to Declare. In it, he stated for the first time that he was glad that the proposed South African cricket tour to England in 1970 was called off, for fear of public disturbances. In 2004, journalist Peter Oborne wrote a biography entitled Basil D'Oliveira: Cricket and Conspiracy (ISBN 0-3167-2572-2), which was awarded the William Hill Sports Book of the Year and was accompanied by Paul Yule's RTS award-winning documentary Not Cricket—The Basil D'Oliveira Conspiracy.

He was namechecked in the first episode of the BBC comedy Fawlty Towers (aired in September 1975) with the character of The Major exclaiming that "D'Oliveira made a hundred!".

== Personal life ==
He was married to Naomi, and their son Damian D'Oliveira also played first-class cricket for Worcestershire CCC and joined the coaching staff after his retirement from playing. His grandson, Brett D'Oliveira, is currently captain of Worcestershire CCC, having made his debut for the county in 2011. There has been a D'Oliveira on the staff at Worcestershire CCC, as either player or coach, ever since Basil first joined the County in 1964.

== Death ==
D'Oliveira had Parkinson's disease in later life. He died aged 80 (or possibly 83) in England, on 19 November 2011.

A farewell for D'Oliveira was written on the last 2011 issue of Time magazine by Trevor Manuel, South Africa's Minister in the Presidency for National Planning. It highlights the personal successes of the cricket player, together with the impact he had on South African sport and society. A memorial service was held in Worcester Cathedral on 27 January 2012; Sir Michael Parkinson gave one of the eulogies.

In September 2018, he was posthumously awarded the Freedom of the City of Worcester in recognition of his contribution to the city. The award was accepted by his son Shaun at a ceremony in the Guildhall in Worcester on 14 September 2018.

Sporting positions
Preceded by Henry Horton	Worcestershire cricket coach 1980–1990	Succeeded by Kevin Lyons
