= 1994 ICC Trophy squads =

Twenty teams participated in the 1994 ICC Trophy, the fifth edition of the tournament. Three teams – Ireland, Namibia, and the United Arab Emirates – were making their debuts, while West Africa returned to the tournament for the first time since the 1982 edition. Zimbabwe, the winner of the past three tournaments, did not return, as they had been made full members of the International Cricket Council (ICC).

== Argentina ==
Only players who appeared in at least one match at the tournament are listed. The leading run-scorer is marked with a dagger (†) and the leading wicket-taker with a double dagger (‡).

- Leo Alonso
- Sergio Ciaburri
- Martin Cortabarria
- Alejandro Ferguson
- Tony Ferguson
- Donald Forrester †
- Alexander Gooding
- Bernardo Irigoyen

- Lorenzo Jooris
- Guillermo Kirschbaum
- Miguel Morris
- Hernan Pereyra ‡
- Andres Perez Rivero
- Brian Roberts
- P. M. Roca
- Christian Tuñon

Source: ESPNcricinfo

== Bangladesh ==
Only players who appeared in at least one match at the tournament are listed. The leading run-scorer is marked with a dagger (†) and the leading wicket-taker with a double dagger (‡).

- Akram Khan
- Aminul Islam
- Athar Ali Khan
- Enamul Haque
- Faruk Ahmed
- Gholam Nousher
- Jahangir Alam †
- Jahangir Alam Talukdar

- Minhajul Abedin ‡
- Mizanur Rahman
- Nasir Ahmed
- Selim Shahid
- Shanewas Shahid
- Sharfuddoula
- Shariful Haque

Source: ESPNcricinfo

== Bermuda ==
Only players who appeared in at least one match at the tournament are listed. The leading run-scorer is marked with a dagger (†) and the leading wicket-taker with a double dagger (‡).

- Terry Burgess
- Pacer Edwards ‡
- Noel Gibbons
- Arnold Manders
- Charlie Marshall
- Dean Minors
- Bruce Perinchief

- Kenny Phillip
- Jeff Richardson
- Clay Smith
- Dexter Smith †
- Albert Steede
- Clevie Wade

Source: ESPNcricinfo

== Canada ==
Only players who appeared in at least one match at the tournament are listed. The leading run-scorer is marked with a dagger (†) and the leading wicket-taker with a double dagger (‡).

- Errol Barrow
- Steve Dutchin
- Derick Etwaroo
- Tony Gardner ‡
- Nigel Isaacs
- Shantha Jayasekera
- Davis Joseph
- Ingleton Liburd †

- Don Maxwell
- Martin Prashad
- Paul Prashad
- Danny Ramnarais
- Barry Seebaran
- Bhawan Singh
- Danny Singh

Source: ESPNcricinfo

== Denmark ==
Only players who appeared in at least one match at the tournament are listed. The leading run-scorer is marked with a dagger (†) and the leading wicket-taker with a double dagger (‡).

- Aftab Ahmed
- Atif Butt †
- Mogens Christiansen
- Allan From-Hansen
- Jesper Gregersen
- Søren Henriksen
- Ole Mortensen ‡

- Per Pedersen
- Henrik Pfaff
- Mohammad Saddiq
- Mogens Seider
- Lejf Slebsager
- Carsten Strandvig
- Søren Vestergaard

Source: ESPNcricinfo

== East and Central Africa ==
Only players who appeared in at least one match at the tournament are listed. The leading run-scorer is marked with a dagger (†) and the leading wicket-taker with a double dagger (‡).

- Haroon Bags
- Imran Brohi †
- S. Dassu
- R. Davda
- M. Dhirani
- Steven Kapere ‡
- Said Malama
- B. Mehta

- A. Merchant
- Kazim Nasser
- P. Patel
- Yekesh Patel
- K. Sabsali
- Faizel Sarigat
- James Shikuku
- Vali Tarmohamed

Source: ESPNcricinfo

== Fiji ==
Only players who appeared in at least one match at the tournament are listed. The leading run-scorer is marked with a dagger (†) and the leading wicket-taker with a double dagger (‡).

- Taione Batina
- Cecil Browne
- Taione Cakacaka
- Stephen Campbell
- Safania Jitoko
- Joeli Mateyawa ‡
- Taniela Naulivou

- Satya Raju
- Jason Rouse †
- Jone Seuvou
- Asaeli Sorovakatini
- Lesi Sorovakatini
- Atunaisi Tawatatau
- Richard Wotta

Source: ESPNcricinfo

== Gibraltar ==
Only players who appeared in at least one match at the tournament are listed. The leading run-scorer is marked with a dagger (†) and the leading wicket-taker with a double dagger (‡).

Coach: (England) Richard Cox

- D. Beltran
- Bob Brooks ‡
- Richard Buzaglo
- Tim Buzaglo
- Clive Clinton
- Gary De'Ath
- Terence Garcia

- Adrian Hewitt
- Vince Kenny
- Wilfred Perez
- Rudolph Phillips
- Jeffrey Rhodes
- Stephen Shephard
- D. Stimson

Source: ESPNcricinfo

== Hong Kong ==
Only players who appeared in at least one match at the tournament are listed. The leading run-scorer is marked with a dagger (†) and the leading wicket-taker with a double dagger (‡).

- Steve Atkinson
- Leigh Beaman
- Stewart Brew †‡
- Ray Brewster
- Paul Cresswell
- David Cross
- Tim Davies
- Mark Eames

- Riaz Farcy
- Pat Fordham
- John Garden
- Jonathan Orders
- Justin Strachan
- Ravi Sujanani
- Yarman Vachha

Source: ESPNcricinfo

== Ireland ==
Only players who appeared in at least one match at the tournament are listed. The leading run-scorer is marked with a dagger (†) and the leading wicket-taker with a double dagger (‡).

- Justin Benson †
- Mark Cohen
- Dekker Curry
- Neil Doak
- Angus Dunlop
- Uel Graham
- Garfield Harrison
- Conor Hoey

- Paul Jackson
- Alan Lewis
- Charles McCrum ‡
- Paul McCrum
- Brian Millar
- Edward Moore
- Alan Nelson
- Michael Rea

Source: ESPNcricinfo

== Israel ==
Only players who appeared in at least one match at the tournament are listed. The leading run-scorer is marked with a dagger (†) and the leading wicket-taker with a double dagger (‡).

- Raymond Aston ‡
- Hillel Awasker
- Aby Daniels
- Benjamin David ‡
- Jacky Divekar
- Mark Hamburger
- Michael Jacob ‡
- Nissam Jhirad

- Davis Moss
- R. Nichol
- Stanley Perlman
- Shimshon Raj
- S. Samuel
- Avi Talkar
- G. Talkar
- Neil Ward †

Source: ESPNcricinfo

== Kenya ==
Only players who appeared in at least one match at the tournament are listed. The leading run-scorer is marked with a dagger (†) and the leading wicket-taker with a double dagger (‡).

- Rajab Ali ‡
- Dipak Chudasama
- Sandeep Gupta
- Tariq Iqbal
- Aasif Karim ‡
- Sibtain Kassamali
- Alfred Njuguna
- Martin Odumbe

- Maurice Odumbe †
- Tito Odumbe
- Kennedy Otieno
- Martin Suji
- David Tikolo
- Steve Tikolo
- Tom Tikolo

Source: ESPNcricinfo

== Malaysia ==
Only players who appeared in at least one match at the tournament are listed. The leading run-scorer is marked with a dagger (†) and the leading wicket-taker with a double dagger (‡).

- S. Bell
- George Benzier
- Rakesh Chander
- T. Mathew
- Ramesh Menon
- Marimuthu Muniandy
- Suresh Navaratnam
- Desmon Patrik

- Dinesh Ramadas ‡
- Kunjiraman Ramadas
- Edward Seah
- Rohan Selvaratnam
- Tan Kim Hing ‡
- David Thalalla †
- Santhara Vello

Source: ESPNcricinfo

== Namibia ==
Only players who appeared in at least one match at the tournament are listed. The leading run-scorer is marked with a dagger (†) and the leading wicket-taker with a double dagger (‡).

- Wayne Ackerman
- Mark Barnard
- Ettienne Brits
- Trevor Britten
- Norman Curry
- Andy Fallis
- Morne Karg
- Danie Keulder

- Deon Kotze
- Lennie Louw
- Martin Martins
- Gavin Murgatroyd †‡
- André Smith
- Ian van Schoor
- Melt van Schoor

Source: ESPNcricinfo

== Netherlands ==
Only players who appeared in at least one match at the tournament are listed. The leading run-scorer is marked with a dagger (†) and the leading wicket-taker with a double dagger (‡).

- Flavian Aponso
- Leon Bouter
- Nolan Clarke †
- Tim de Leede
- Ewout de Man
- Floris Jansen ‡
- Phil Keukelaar
- Bart Kuijlman

- Joost Leemhuis
- Roland Lefebvre
- Steven Lubbers
- Reinout Scholte
- Jeroen Smits
- Robert van Oosterom
- Huib Visée ‡

Source: ESPNcricinfo

== Papua New Guinea ==
Only players who appeared in at least one match at the tournament are listed. The leading run-scorer is marked with a dagger (†) and the leading wicket-taker with a double dagger (‡).

- Numa Alu
- Charles Amini
- Tau Ao
- Fred Arua ‡
- Toka Gaudi
- Babani Harry
- Kosta Ilaraki
- Api Leka

- Leka Leka
- William Maha
- Aukuma Noka
- Lakani Oala
- Vavine Pala
- Ola Raka
- Tuku Raka
- G. Rarua †

Source: ESPNcricinfo

== Singapore ==
Only players who appeared in at least one match at the tournament are listed. The leading run-scorer is marked with a dagger (†) and the leading wicket-taker with a double dagger (‡).

- N. Amarasuriya
- A. Frazer
- Goh Swee Heng
- Imran Hamid
- Champaklal Kantilal
- Chris Kilbee
- Keith Martens

- Thaiyar Mohamed †
- Stacey Muruthi
- Mohanvelu Neethianathan
- R. Ramkrishnan
- T. E. Seal
- J. Stevenson ‡
- Ravi Thambinayagam

Source: ESPNcricinfo

== United Arab Emirates ==
Only players who appeared in at least one match at the tournament are listed. The leading run-scorer is marked with a dagger (†) and the leading wicket-taker with a double dagger (‡).

- Ali Akbar
- Arshad Laeeq ‡
- Azhar Saeed †
- Imtiaz Abbasi
- Johanne Samarasekera
- Mazhar Hussain
- Mohammad Hyder

- Mohammad Ishaq
- Riaz Poonawala
- S. Khan
- Saleem Raza
- Sohail Butt
- Sultan Zarawani
- Vijay Mehra

Source: ESPNcricinfo

== United States ==
Only players who appeared in at least one match at the tournament are listed. The leading run-scorer is marked with a dagger (†) and the leading wicket-taker with a double dagger (‡).

- Aijaz Ali
- Zamin Amin ‡
- Hopeton Barrett
- Reginald Benjamin
- Hubert Blackman
- Raymond Denny
- Alvin Howard
- Derek Kallicharran

- Rudy Lachman
- Edward Lewis
- Sew Shivnarine
- Paul Singh †
- Shawn Skeete
- Albert Texeira
- Garfield Wildman
- Ken Williams

Source: ESPNcricinfo

== West Africa ==
Only players who appeared in at least one match at the tournament are listed. The leading run-scorer is marked with a dagger (†) and the leading wicket-taker with a double dagger (‡).

- Kome Agodo
- Gbenga Akinyombo
- Tony Ayamah
- J. O. Elliot
- Johnny Gomez
- L. Idowu
- Albert Kpundeh
- Sahr Kpundeh

- Uche Ntinu
- Donald Ovberedjo
- Kofi Sagoe
- Kwesi Sagoe
- A. Samu
- Okon Ukpong †
- Daniel Vanderpuje-Orgle ‡
- George Wiltshire

Source: ESPNcricinfo

== Sources ==
- CricketArchive: Averages by teams, ABN-AMRO ICC Trophy 1993/94
- ESPNcricinfo: Unibind ABN-AMRO ICC Trophy, 1993/94 / Statistics
