= Bryn Lockie =

Scottish cricketer (born 1968)

Personal information
- Full name: Bryn Gardner Lockie
- Born: 5 June 1968 (age 58); Alloa, Clackmannanshire, Scotland
- Batting: Right-handed
- Role: Opening batsman

International information
- National side: Scotland (1995–2000)
- Source: CricketArchive, 2 February 2016

Bryn Gardner Lockie (born 5 June 1968) is a former Scottish international cricketer who represented the Scottish national side between 1995 and 2000. He played as right-handed opening batsman.

== Life ==
Lockie was born in Alloa, Clackmannanshire, and attended Dollar Academy in nearby Dollar. He made his senior debut for Scotland at the 1995 British Isles Championship, against Wales. Playing against Ireland in the 1996 edition of the tournament, he was involved in a match-winning opening stand of 198 runs with Ian Philip, to which he contributed 70 runs. Lockie made his first-class debut later in 1996, also against Ireland. The following year, he was selected in the Scottish squad for the 1997 ICC Trophy in Malaysia, and went on to play in six of his team's nine matches. He scored 114 runs at the tournament, with a best of 58 against Italy. At the 1998 Benson & Hedges Cup, Lockie played in all four of his team's games, and scored two half-centuries – 51 against Derbyshire and 54 against Durham. He scored another List A half-century in the 1999 NatWest Trophy, making 58 against the Nottinghamshire Cricket Board. Lockie's last appearances for Scotland came at the 2000 European Cricket Championship.

In 2016, Lockie was a teacher at Stewart's Melville College.
