= Leemhuis =

Leemhuis is a Dutch surname. Notable people with the surname include:

- Jaap Leemhuis (1941–2014), Dutch field hockey player
- Joan Leemhuis-Stout (born 1946), Dutch politician
- Joost Leemhuis (born 1969), Dutch cricketer
- Niels Leemhuis (born 1997), Dutch footballer
