= 1997 ICC Trophy =

International cricket tournament

- Dates: 24 March – 13 April 1997
- Administrator: International Cricket Council
- Cricket format: Limited overs cricket
- Tournament format(s): Round-robin and Knockout
- Host: Malaysia
- Champions: Bangladesh (1st title)
- Runners-up: Kenya
- Participants: 22
- Matches: 81
- Player of the series: (Kenya) Maurice Odumbe
- Most runs: (Kenya) Maurice Odumbe (493)
- Most wickets: (Kenya) Aasif Karim (19) (Netherlands) Asim Khan (19) (Bangladesh) Mohammad Rafique (19)

The Carlsberg 1997 ICC Trophy was a cricket tournament played in Kuala Lumpur, Malaysia between 24 March and 13 April 1997. It was the Cricket World Cup qualification tournament for the 1999 Cricket World Cup.

Bangladesh were the winners of the tournament, defeating Kenya in the final, while Scotland won the third place play-off. These three teams took the three available spots in the World Cup, Bangladesh and Scotland both qualifying for this tournament for the first time.

With some World Cup matches scheduled in Scotland and the Netherlands, Scotland would become the first Associate nation to play a home fixture in a World Cup. The Netherlands failed to qualify but World Cup matches were still held in the Netherlands.

== First round ==
The first round took the form of a group stage, with four groups, two comprising six teams and two consisting of five teams. The top two teams from each group went through to the second round, whilst the remaining 14 teams took part in play-offs for the final standings.

=== Points tables ===
Group A Table
Team	Played	Won	Lost	Tied	Abandoned	Points	Net RRA
Kenya	5	5	0	0	0	10	2.712
Ireland	5	4	1	0	0	8	1.682
United States	5	3	2	0	0	6	0.740
Singapore	5	2	3	0	0	4	−1.130
Gibraltar	5	1	4	0	0	2	−2.096
Israel	5	0	5	0	0	0	−1.823

Group B Table
Team	Played	Won	Lost	Tied	Abandoned	Points	Net RRA
Bangladesh	5	5	0	0	0	10	1.909
Denmark	5	4	1	0	0	8	0.931
United Arab Emirates	5	3	2	0	0	6	0.323
Malaysia (H)	5	2	3	0	0	4	0.031
West Africa	5	1	4	0	0	2	−1.073
Argentina	5	0	5	0	0	0	−2.350

Group C Table
Team	Played	Won	Lost	Tied	Abandoned	Points	Net RRA
Netherlands	4	3	0	0	1	7	2.932
Canada	4	3	0	0	1	7	0.850
Fiji	4	2	2	0	0	4	0.184
Namibia	4	1	3	0	0	2	−1.293
East and Central Africa	4	0	4	0	0	0	−0.984

Group D Table
Team	Played	Won	Lost	Tied	Abandoned	Points	Net RRA
Scotland	4	4	0	0	0	8	1.646
Hong Kong	4	3	1	0	0	6	0.707
Bermuda	4	2	2	0	0	4	0.696
Papua New Guinea	4	1	3	0	0	2	−0.722
Italy	4	0	4	0	0	0	−2.359

Position of teams in the table is determined by:
1. Total points
2. Head-to-head result (if more than two teams level, head-to-head only applies if all those teams have played the same number of matches against each other)
3. Net run rate

== Second round ==
The second round was also a group stage, this time with two groups of four. The top two teams went through to the semi-final stage, whilst the third placed teams played off for fifth place, and the fourth placed teams played off for 7th place.

=== Group E ===
==== Points tables ====
Team	Played	Won	Lost	Tied	Abandoned	Points	Net RRA
Kenya	3	2	0	0	1	5	2.324
Scotland	3	1	1	0	1	3	0.274
Denmark	3	1	1	0	1	3	−0.380
Canada	3	0	2	0	1	1	−1.500

==== Matches ====
1 April
Scorecard

Kenya; 303/6 (50 overs)	v	Canada; 143/8 (48 overs)
Maurice Odumbe 148* (122); Shiv Seeram 3/46 (10 overs)		Ingleton Liburd 28 (71); Tony Suji 3/38 (7 overs)

Kenya won by 141 runs
Kilat Kelab Club, Kuala Lumpur
Umpires: Louis Hogan (Ireland) and Duco Ohm (Netherlands)
Player of the match: Maurice Odumbe (Kenya)

- Kenya won the toss and elected to bat

1 April
Scorecard

Scotland; 167 (48 overs)	v	Denmark; 122 (45.3 overs)
George Salmond 59 (115); Peer Jensen 4/25 (10 overs)		Johnny Jensen 21 (24); Ian Beven 4/23 (10 overs)

Scotland won by 45 runs
RMC, Kuala Lumpur
Umpires: AFM Akhtaruddin (Bangladesh) and H Whitlock (Hong Kong)
Player of the match: George Salmond (Scotland)

- Scotland won the toss and elected to bat

2 April
Scorecard

Canada; 99/4 (29.4 overs)	v	Scotland
Ingleton Liburd 39 (80); Scott Gourlay 1/10 (6 overs)

No result
Rubber Research Institute Ground, Kuala Lumpur
Umpires: AFM Akhtaruddin (Bangladesh) and Duco Ohm (Netherlands)

- Canada won the toss and elected to bat
- Match abandoned due to rain

2 April
Scorecard

Kenya; 33/4 (9.4 overs)	v	Denmark
Kennedy Otieno 10 (14); Soren Sorensen 2/12 (5 overs)

No result
Kelab Aman, Kuala Lumpur
Umpires: I Massey (England) and H Whitlock (Hong Kong)

- Kenya won the toss and elected to bat
- Match abandoned due to rain

4 April
Scorecard

Denmark; 126 (48.1 overs)	v	Canada; 119 (27.2 overs)
Baljit Singh 29 (76); Ingleton Liburd 3/14 (5 overs)		Nigel Isaacs 43* (58); Thomas Hansen 5/51 (10 overs)

Denmark won by 7 runs
Royal Selangor Club, Kuala Lumpur
Umpires: JK Kruger (Namibia) and Duco Ohm (Netherlands)
Player of the match: Thomas Hansen (Denmark)

- Denmark won the toss and elected to bat

4 April
Scorecard

Kenya; 153 (48.2 overs)	v	Scotland; 37/3 (23 overs)
Steve Tikolo 32 (59); Scott Gourlay 3/26 (9.2 overs)		Bryn Lockie 18* (63); Martin Suji 3/18 (10 overs)

Kenya won by 26 runs (D/L)
Perbadanan Kemajuan Negeri Selangor, Kuala Lumpur
Umpires: Louis Hogan (Ireland) and H Whitlock (Hong Kong)
Player of the match: Unknown

- Kenya won the toss and elected to bat
- Rain halted Scotland's innings; Under the Duckworth-Lewis method, Scotland needed to be at least 63 runs to win the match at this stage

=== Group F ===
==== Points tables ====
Team	Played	Won	Lost	Tied	Abandoned	Points	Net RRA
Ireland	3	2	0	0	1	5	0.767
Bangladesh	3	2	0	0	1	5	0.695
Netherlands	3	0	2	0	1	1	−0.208
Hong Kong	3	0	2	0	1	1	−1.030

==== Matches ====
1 April
Scorecard

Hong Kong; 145 (45.2 overs)	v	Bangladesh; 148/3 (38.2 overs)
Riaz Farcy 38 (65); Mohammad Rafique 3/20 (7.2 overs)		Aminul Islam 53* (83); Stewart Brew 1/19 (6 overs)

Bangladesh won by 7 wickets
Perbadanan Kemajuan Negeri Selangor, Kuala Lumpur
Umpires: Johan Luther (Denmark) and William Smith (Scotland)
Player of the match: Aminul Islam (Bangladesh)

- Bangladesh won the toss and elected to field

1 April
Scorecard

Netherlands; 211/8 (50 overs)	v	Ireland; 91/3 (23 overs)
Peter Cantrell 53* (74); Peter Gillespie 2/20 (9 overs)		Dekker Curry 30 (32); Andre van Troost 1/11 (3 overs)

Ireland won by 5 runs (D/L)
Kelab Aman, Kuala Lumpur
Umpires: Farid Malik (United Arab Emirates) and JK Kruger (Namibia)
Player of the match: Unknown

- Ireland won the toss and elected to field
- Rain halted Ireland's innings; Under the Duckworth-Lewis method, Ireland needed to be at least 87 runs to win the match at this stage

2 April
Scorecard

Ireland; 129 (49.1 overs)	v	Bangladesh; 24/0 (6.4 overs)
Neil Doak 32 (73); Hasibul Hossain 3/21 (10 overs)		Athar Ali Khan 8* (21); Mark Patterson 0/8 (3 overs)

No result
Royal Selangor Club, Kuala Lumpur
Umpires: JK Kruger (Namibia) and Johan Luther (Denmark)

- Ireland won the toss and elected to bat
- Match abandoned due to a slippery outfield

2 April
Scorecard

Hong Kong; 170 (47.5 overs)	v	Netherlands; 16/0 (5.2 overs)
Pat Fordham 32 (73); Asim Khan 4/28 (8.5 overs)		Bas Zuiderent 7* (16); Riaz Farcy 0/6 (2.2 overs)

No result
Kilat Kelab Club, Kuala Lumpur
Umpires: Tony Cooper (Fiji) and Makbul Jaffer (Kenya)

- Hong Kong won the toss and elected to bat
- Match abandoned due to rain and lightning

4 April
Scorecard

Netherlands; 171 (49.5 overs)	v	Bangladesh; 141/7 (31.4 overs)
Robert van Oosterom 40 (59); Akram Khan 2/21 (4.5 overs)		Akram Khan 68* (92); Roland Lefebvre 3/8 (7 overs)

Bangladesh won by 3 wickets (D/L)
Rubber Research Institute Ground, Kuala Lumpur
Umpires: Makbul Jaffer (Kenya) and I Massey (England)
Player of the match: Akram Khan (Bangladesh)

- Bangladesh won the toss and elected to field
- Rain interrupted Bangladesh's innings; Duckworth-Lewis revised target to win: 141 runs in 33 overs for Bangladesh

4 April
Scorecard

Ireland; 223/7 (50 overs)	v	Hong Kong; 172 (45.3 overs)
Angus Dunlop 54 (61); Rahul Sharma 3/29 (10 overs)		Stewart Brew 50 (85); Paul McCrum 3/30 (10 overs)

Ireland won by 51 runs
Kelab Aman, Kuala Lumpur
Umpires: Tony Cooper (Fiji) and Johan Luther (Denmark)
Player of the match: Angus Dunlop (Ireland)

- Hong Kong won the toss and elected to field

== Plate championship and play-offs ==
14 Teams placed below second position from first round groups contested for the plate championship and play-offs. Champion team was awarded Philip Snow Plate named after legendary Fijian cricketer Philip Snow.

1 April
Scorecard

Argentina; 150 (46.3 overs)	v	Gibraltar; 151/6 (41.1 overs)
Bernardo Irigoyen 39 (60); Gary De'Ath 2/21 (10 overs)		Tim Buzaglo 48 (78); Diego Lord 2/16 (5 overs)

Gibraltar won by 4 wickets
Royal Selangor Club, Kuala Lumpur
Umpires: Colin Hoare (Canada) and Khoo Chai Huat (Malaysia)
Player of the match: Tim Buzaglo (Gibraltar)

- Gibraltar won the toss and elected to field
- Gibraltar advanced to 17th place play-off semi finals

1 April
Scorecard

West Africa; 247/6 (50 overs)	v	Israel; 57 (21.1 overs)
Okon Ukpong 78* (91); Benzie Kehimkar 2/28 (10 overs)		Avi Talkar 16 (29); Daniel Vanderpuje-Orgle 5/31 (10 overs)

West Africa won by 190 runs
RMC, Kuala Lumpur
Umpires: D Ker (Argentina) and Hammy Reid (United States)
Player of the match: Okon Ukpong (West Africa)

- Israel won the toss and elected to field
- West Africa advanced to 17th place play-off semi finals

=== 17th place play-off semi finals ===
2 April
Scorecard

East and Central Africa; 232 (49.5 overs)	v	Italy
Yekesh Patel 95 (98); Akhlaq Qureshi 3/30 (9.5 overs)

No result
University of Malaya, Kuala Lumpur
Umpires: Bachitar Singh (Singapore) and AOD George (West Africa)

- East and Central Africa won the toss and elected to bat
- Match abandoned due to rain and a flooded ground
- East and Central Africa advanced on tournament net run rate

2 April
Scorecard

West Africa; 132 (49.2 overs)	v	Gibraltar; 10/1 (2 overs)
Kome Agodo 36 (76); Gary De'Ath 4/25 (10 overs)		Rudolph Phillips 4* (5); Seye Fadahunsi 1/4 (1 overs)

No result
Victoria Institution, Kuala Lumpur
Umpires: Farid Malik (United Arab Emirates) and W Maha (Papua New Guinea)

- Gibraltar won the toss and elected to field
- Match abandoned due to rain
- West Africa advanced on tournament net run rate

=== 13th place play-off semi finals ===
1 April
Scorecard

Papua New Guinea; 134 (27.3 overs)	v	Namibia; 129 (47.5 overs)
Vavine Pala 39 (36); Mark Barnard 3/18 (5.3 overs)		Ian Stevenson 32 (82); Vavine Pala 5/16 (6.5 overs)

Papua New Guinea won by 5 runs
University of Malaya, Kuala Lumpur
Umpires: D Beltran (Gibraltar) and Naor Gudker (Israel)
Player of the match: Vavine Pala (Papua New Guinea)

- Papua New Guinea won the toss and elected to bat

2 April
Scorecard

Malaysia; 130 (48.2 overs)	v	Singapore; 54/3 (18.1 overs)
Santhara Vello 41 (78); Rod David 3/19 (10 overs)		Moiz Sithawalla 15 (41); Dinesh Ramadas 1/4 (3 overs)

Singapore won by 7 wickets (D/L)
Rubber Research Institute Ground, Kuala Lumpur
Umpires: Randy Butler (Bermuda) and Naor Gudker (Israel)
Player of the match: Unknown

- Singapore won the toss and elected to field
- Rain interrupted Singapore's innings; Duckworth-Lewis revised target to win: 54 runs in 20 overs for Singapore

=== Plate semi finals ===
1 April
Scorecard

United Arab Emirates; 189/8 (50 overs)	v	United States; 155 (40.2 overs)
Ali Akbar 32 (80); Derek Kallicharran 2/32 (10 overs)		Faoud Bacchus 51 (45); Azhar Saeed 3/30 (9 overs)

United Arab Emirates won by 34 runs
Victoria Institution, Kuala Lumpur
Umpires: Tony Cooper (Fiji) and VM Rafik (East and Central Africa)
Player of the match: Faoud Bacchus (United States)

- United Arab Emirates won the toss and elected to bat

2 April
Scorecard

Bermuda; 146 (46 overs)	v	Fiji; 46/3 (12.3 overs)
Arnold Manders 28 (51); Neil Maxwell 4/17 (9 overs)		Jone Sorovakatini 17 (17); Corey Hill 2/27 (6 overs)

No result
Perbadanan Kemajuan Negeri Selangor, Kuala Lumpur
Umpires: D Beltran (Gibraltar) and C Sen (Malaysia)

- Bermuda won the toss and elected to bat
- Match abandoned due to rain
- Bermuda advanced on tournament net run rate

=== 19th place play-off ===
4 April
Scorecard

Israel; 64 (21.5 overs)	v	Argentina; 65/1 (27.3 overs)
Yefeth Nagavkar 26 (32); Bernardo Irigoyen 4/27 (8.3 overs)		Brian Roberts 30 (86); Louis Hall 2/25 (8 overs)

Argentina won by 9 wickets
Victoria Institution, Kuala Lumpur
Umpires: Randy Butler (Bermuda) and Hammy Reid (United States)
Player of the match: Bernardo Irigoyen (Argentina)

- Israel won the toss and elected to bat

=== 17th place play-off ===
4 April
Scorecard

East and Central Africa; 158 (49.4 overs)	v	West Africa; 113 (42.2 overs)
Arif Ebrahim 42 (116); Seye Fadahunsi 3/23 (8.4 overs)		Obo Omoigui 32 (72); Imran Brohi 3/6 (4 overs)

East and Central Africa won by 45 runs
RMC, Kuala Lumpur
Umpires: D Beltran (Gibraltar) and AS Peter (Malaysia)
Player of the match: Imran Brohi (East & Central Africa)

- East and Central Africa won the toss and elected to bat

=== 15th place play-off ===
4 April
Scorecard

Malaysia; 142 (48.3 overs)	v	Namibia; 147/3 (35.3 overs)
Suresh Navaratnam 41 (69); Rudie van Vuuren 4/27 (8.3 overs)		Danie Keulder 45 (59); Rohan Selvaratnam 2/25 (8 overs)

Namibia won by 7 wickets
Kilat Kelab Club, Kuala Lumpur
Umpires: William Smith (Scotland) and Rafiq Valimahomed (East and Central Africa)
Player of the match: Danie Keulder (Namibia)

- Namibia won the toss and elected to field

=== 13th place play-off ===
5 April
Scorecard

Papua New Guinea; 166 (45.1 overs)	v	Singapore; 96 (41.4 overs)
Navu Maha 45 (60); Graham Wilson 3/53 (10 overs)		Anthon Ranggi 14 (52); Toka Gaudi 4/23 (10 overs)

Papua New Guinea won by 70 runs
Royal Selangor Club, Kuala Lumpur
Umpires: Farid Malik (United Arab Emirates) and Colin Hoare (Canada)
Player of the match: Toka Gaudi (Papua New Guinea)

- Papua New Guinea won the toss and elected to field

=== 11th place play-off ===
5 April
Scorecard

United States; 193 (48.3 overs)	v	Fiji; 197/5 (47 overs)
Aijaz Ali 44 (70); Waisake Tukana 5/31 (7 overs)		Joji Bulabalavu 37 (48); Derek Kallicharran 2/33 (10 overs)

Fiji won by 5 wickets
RMC, Kuala Lumpur
Umpires: AFM Akhtaruddin (Bangladesh) and Ismail Khan (Malaysia)
Player of the match: Waisake Tukana (Fiji)

- United States won the toss and elected to bat

=== Plate final ===
5 April
Scorecard

Bermuda; 214/8 (50 overs)	v	United Arab Emirates; 156 (40.2 overs)
Janeiro Tucker 42 (68); Arshad Laeeq 4/28 (7 overs)		Saleem Raza 37 (32); Delano Hollis 3/20 (10 overs)

Bermuda won by 58 runs
Kelab Aman, Kuala Lumpur
Umpires: D Ker (Argentina) and Khoo Chai Huat (Malaysia)
Player of the match: Glen Smith (Bermuda)

- Bermuda won the toss and elected to bat

== Finals and play-offs ==
=== 7th place play-off ===
5 April
Scorecard

Hong Kong; 125 (42.4 overs)	v	Canada; 126/6 (41.5 overs)
Stewart Brew 46 (90); Latchman Bhansingh 3/13 (5 overs)		Muneeb Diwan 35 (75); Ravi Sujanani 2/16 (7 overs)

Canada won by 4 wickets
Perbadanan Kemajuan Negeri Selangor, Kuala Lumpur
Umpires: Louis Hogan (Ireland) and Makbul Jaffer (Kenya)
Player of the match: Muneeb Diwan (Canada)

- Hong Kong won the toss and elected to bat

=== 5th place play-off ===
5 April
Scorecard

Netherlands; 198/8 (50 overs)	v	Denmark; 200/7 (49.4 overs)
Asim Khan 48* (33); Morten Hedegaard 2/20 (10 overs)		Soren Henriksen 42 (72); Steven van Dijk 3/35 (10 overs)

Denmark won by 3 wickets
Rubber Research Institute Ground, Kuala Lumpur
Umpires: S Kathiravel (Malaysia) and H Whitlock (Hong Kong)
Player of the match: Thomas Hansen (Denmark)

- Denmark won the toss and elected to field

=== Semi finals ===
The first semi final between Ireland and Kenya was won by Kenya by just seven runs. Maurice Odumbe won the man of the match award for his 67 in Kenya's innings. The second semi final was won by Bangladesh who beat Scotland by 72 runs.

6, 7 April
Scorecard

Kenya; 215/8 (50 overs)	v	Ireland; 208/9 (50 overs)
Maurice Odumbe 67 (76); Paul McCrum 4/51 (9 overs)		Derek Heasley 51 (48); Aasif Karim 4/28 (10 overs)

Kenya won by 7 runs
Kilat Kelab Club, Kuala Lumpur
Umpires: Darrell Hair (Australia) and Nigel Plews (England)
Player of the match: Maurice Odumbe (Kenya)

- Ireland won the toss and elected to field
- Reserve day used
- Kenya qualified for the 1999 World Cup as a result of this match

8, 9 April
Scorecard

Bangladesh; 243/4 (50 overs)	v	Scotland; 171 (44.5 overs)
Khaled Mashud 70 (96); Ian Beven 2/29 (10 overs)		Greig Williamson 39* (59); Mohammad Rafique 4/25 (5.5 overs)

Bangladesh won by 72 runs
Kilat Kelab Club, Kuala Lumpur
Umpires: Nigel Plews (England) and S. Venkataraghavan (India)
Player of the match: Khaled Mashud (Bangladesh)

- Scotland won the toss and elected to field
- Reserve day used
- Bangladesh qualified for the 1999 World Cup as a result of this match

=== 3rd place play-off ===
In the 3rd place play off, Scotland batted first, and scored 187 in 45 overs after rain delayed the start. Mike Smith top scored for Scotland with 49. The Duckworth-Lewis method set Ireland's target at 192 runs, but the Irish were bowled out for 141, Keith Sheridan taking 4/34 with his left arm spin. Scotland thus qualified for the 1999 World Cup.

10, 11 April
Scorecard

Scotland; 187/8 (45 overs)	v	Ireland; 141/8 (39 overs)
Mike Smith 49 (88); Mark Patterson 2/42 (8 overs)		Justin Benson 26 (45); Keith Sheridan 4/34 (9 overs)

Scotland won by 51 runs (D/L)
Kilat Kelab Club, Kuala Lumpur
Umpires: Darrell Hair (Australia) and S. Venkataraghavan (India)
Player of the match: Mike Smith (Scotland)

- Ireland won the toss and elected to field
- Rain interrupted play and reduced the match to 45 overs per team; Duckworth-Lewis revised target to win: 192 runs in 45 overs for Ireland
- Reserve day used
- Scotland qualified for the 1999 World Cup as a result of this match

=== Final ===
The final between Kenya and Bangladesh was also affected by rain and was played over two days. Kenya batted first and scored 241/8 from their 50 overs, Steve Tikolo top scoring with 147. The Bangladesh target was set at 166 from 25 overs by the Duckworth–Lewis method, a target they reached with the last ball of the match. They were not able to defend their title, as they were elected to Test status in 2000. This would also be Kenya's last appearance in the ICC Trophy being allocated ODI status in 2000, though they returned in the successor tournament, the ICC World Cup Qualifier in 2009.

12, 13 April
Scorecard

Kenya; 241/7 (50 overs)	v	Bangladesh; 166/8 (25 overs)
Steve Tikolo 147 (152); Mohammad Rafique 3/40 (6 overs)		Aminul Islam 37 (37); Tony Suji 2/26 (5 overs)

Bangladesh won by 2 wickets (D/L)
Kilat Kelab Club, Kuala Lumpur
Umpires: Darrell Hair (Australia) and S. Venkataraghavan (India)
Player of the match: Steve Tikolo (Kenya)

- Bangladesh won the toss and elected to field
- Bangladesh's innings shortened due to rain; Duckworth-Lewis revised target to win: 166 runs in 25 overs for Bangladesh
- Reserve day used

== Statistics ==
=== Most runs ===
The top five run scorers (total runs) are included in this table.

Player	Team	Runs	Inns	Avg	Highest	100s	50s
Maurice Odumbe	Kenya	517	9	86.16	121*	3	1
Steve Tikolo	Kenya	392	9	56.00	110	1	2
Dekker Curry	Ireland	391	7	65.16	158*	2	1
Riaz Farcy	Hong Kong	391	9	55.85	108	1	3
Alan Lewis	Ireland	370	9	52.85	126*	1	2

Source: CricketArchive

=== Most wickets ===
The top five wicket takers are listed in this table, listed by wickets taken and then by bowling average.

Player	Team	Overs	Wkts	Ave	SR	Econ	Best
Aasif Karim	Kenya	61.1	19	8.26	19.31	2.56	4/7
Asim Khan	Netherlands	57.1	19	10.26	18.05	3.41	7/9
Mohammad Rafique	Bangladesh	57.4	19	10.68	18.21	3.52	4/25
Søren Sørensen	Denmark	65.5	18	10.16	21.94	2.77	3/19
Martin Suji	Kenya	69.4	17	9.35	24.58	2.28	5/7

Source: CricketArchive

== Final standings ==
Pos	Team	WC Qualification	
1st	Bangladesh	Qualified for 1999 World Cup	
2nd	Kenya	Qualified for 1999 World Cup	
3rd	Scotland	Qualified for 1999 World Cup	Promoted to Division One for the next edition
4th	Ireland		Promoted to Division One for the next edition
5th	Denmark		Promoted to Division One for the next edition
6th	Netherlands		Promoted to Division One for the next edition
7th	Canada		Promoted to Division One for the next edition
8th	Hong Kong		Promoted to Division One for the next edition
9th	Bermuda	Phillip Snow Plate Champion	Promoted to Division One for the next edition
10th	United Arab Emirates		Promoted to Division One for the next edition
11th	Fiji		Promoted to Division One for the next edition
12th	United States		Promoted to Division One for the next edition
13th	Papua New Guinea		Promoted to Division One for the next edition
14th	Singapore		Promoted to Division One for the next edition
15th	Namibia	Relegated to Division two for the next edition	
16th	Malaysia	Relegated to Division two for the next edition	
17th	East and Central Africa	Relegated to Division two for the next edition	
18th	West Africa	Relegated to Division two for the next edition	
19th	Gibraltar	Relegated to Division two for the next edition	
20th	Argentina	Relegated to Division two for the next edition	
21st	Israel; Italy	Relegated to Division two for the next edition	Wooden Spooner

== See also ==
- ICC Trophy
- 1999 Cricket World Cup
