= Tim David =

Australian cricketer (born 1996)

Personal information
- Full name: Timothy Hays David
- Born: 16 March 1996 (age 30); Singapore
- Height: 196 cm (6 ft 5 in)
- Batting: Right-handed
- Bowling: Right-arm off break
- Role: Middle-order batter
- Relatives: Rod David (father)

International information
- National sides: Singapore (2019–2020); Australia (2022–present)
- ODI debut (cap 239): 9 September 2023; Australia v South Africa
- Last ODI: 17 September 2023; Australia v South Africa
- ODI shirt no.: 85
- T20I debut (cap 4/103): 22 July 2019; Singapore v Qatar
- Last T20I: 21 November 2026; Australia v England
- T20I shirt no.: 85

Domestic team information
- Years: Team
- 2017/18–2019/20: Perth Scorchers (Note: Only teams that David played with for more than one season are included in this list.) (squad no. 16)
- 2020/21–present: Hobart Hurricanes (squad no. 8)
- 2021–2023: Southern Brave (squad no. 16)
- 2021–2022, 2025: Saint Lucia Kings
- 2021, 2025–present: RCB
- 2022–2024: Multan Sultans
- 2022–2024: Mumbai Indians
- 2023–2024: MI New York
- 2023–2024: Trinbago Knight Riders
- 2026: Amsterdam Flames
- 2021/22, 2026/27-present: Tasmania

Career statistics
Competition	ODI	T20I	LA	T20
Matches	4	75	22	356
Runs scored	45	1,699	830	6,889
Batting average	11.25	34.67	59.28	31.03
100s/50s	0/0	1/9	2/5	1/24
Top score	35	102*	140*	102*
Balls bowled	12	164	228	670
Wickets	1	5	10	16
Bowling average	20.00	51.00	17.10	61.81
5 wickets in innings	0	0	0	0
10 wickets in match	0	0	0	0
Best bowling	1/20	1/18	3/26	1/0
Catches/stumpings	0/–	44/–	13/–	197/–
- Source: ESPNcricinfo, 22 November 2026

Timothy Hays David (born 16 March 1996) is a Singaporean-born Australian cricketer who plays for the Australian national cricket team in Twenty20 International. He also plays in various franchise leagues, including the Big Bash League, for the Hobart Hurricanes, and the Indian Premier League, for Royal Challengers Bengaluru (RCB).

A right-handed batsman who can bowl off spin, David was born in Singapore before moving to Perth when he was two. He played for the Singapore national cricket team in 2019–2020, making his international debut against Qatar during the 2018–19 T20 World Cup Asia Qualifier. He switched allegiance to Australia from 2022 onwards, playing his first match against India that same year.

David is known for his "explosive" shot-making and the ability generate power into any ball, and was named the Australian Men's Twenty20 International Player of the Year in 2026. He was part of the Australia's squads for the 2022, 2024 and 2026 Men's T20 World Cup.

== Early life ==
Timothy Hays David was born in Singapore to Rod David, a cricketer who played for Singapore at the 1997 ICC Trophy. The family moved to Singapore from Australia in the 1990s where his father worked as an engineer. They moved back to Australia when he was two years old in the wake of the 1997 Asian financial crisis and he grew up in Perth. He attended Scotch College.

== Youth and domestic career ==
David played for the Claremont-Nedlands Cricket Club growing up and won the Olly Cooley Medal in 2016–17 for his performance in Western Australian Premier Cricket. In 2018, he signed a rookie contract for Western Australia. There, he sustained a stress fracture in his foot and transitioned from seam bowling to off break. He lost his rookie contract with the team in early 2019, after which he began focusing on T20 cricket.

He played one match of the 2021–22 Marsh One-Day Cup for Tasmania, where he scored 36* off 28 balls.

In 2026 He Returned To Tasmania In The 2026–27 Dean Jones Trophy.

== Franchise and overseas career ==
=== Big Bash League (2017/18–present) ===
David made his Twenty20 debut for Perth Scorchers in the 2017–18 Big Bash League season (BBL) on 1 January 2018.

For the 2020–21 season, David was signed by the Hobart Hurricanes. In the opening fixture of the tournament, he scored 58 runs, with Hobart beating the Sydney Sixers by 16 runs, and David being named the player of the match. The season was regarded as his breakout, scoring 279 runs over the tournament with a strike rate of 153. In February 2022, David signed a two-year extension to his BBL contract with the Hobart Hurricanes. He signed another two-year extension with the team after being a key part of their 2024–25 title-winning campaign.

=== Pakistan Super League (2021–2023) ===
In May 2021, in the PSL mini replacement draft for the remainder of the postponed 2021 Pakistan Super League, David was signed by Lahore Qalandars as a replacement for Joe Burns. In the following season's draft, he was signed by reigning champions Multan Sultans. He was retained by the Sultans for the following year.

=== Europe (2021–2022) ===
In July 2021, David played in the Hoofdklasse tournament in the Netherlands. There he scored 152 off 95 balls for Quick Den Haag. After playing in the Dutch league, David signed with Surrey County Cricket Club to play in the team's final two matches of the 2021 T20 Blast in England. The following month, he played for Surrey in the 2021 Royal London One-Day Cup, scoring his first century in List A cricket with an unbeaten 140 against Warwickshire. In the quarter-finals of the tournament, David scored 102 as Surrey beat Gloucestershire by five wickets. In February 2022, David was signed by Lancashire County Cricket Club to play in the 2022 T20 Blast.

=== The Hundred (2021–2023, 2026) ===
David was drafted by Southern Brave for the inaugural season of The Hundred. In the season's final, David scored 15 runs from six balls, took a catch, and effected a crucial run out of Liam Livingstone, all influential in Brave's victory. He was bought again by Southern Brave for the 2022 and 2023 seasons. Following his two-year absence from the tournament, David signed with the Trent Rockets for the 2026 season.

=== Indian Premier League (2021–present) ===
In August 2021, David was included in the Royal Challengers Bangalore (RCB) squad for the second phase of the 2021 Indian Premier League (IPL) in the UAE. He made his IPL debut on 24 September 2021 against Chennai Super Kings (CSK). By doing so, he became the first international player from Singapore to play in the IPL. In February 2022, he was bought by the Mumbai Indians in the 2022 Indian Premier League auction and was with the franchise until the 2024 season. He was again bought by RCB in 2025 auction. Also, He was part of RCB when they won their Maiden Title as well as this year in 2026 when they won their second title. He has performed significantly with RCB in 2026 and smashed 70* of 25 balls against CSK leading them to an early season victory.

=== Caribbean Premier League (2021–present) ===
After being signed to the Saint Lucia Kings in 2021, David hit 56 runs off 28 balls in his CPL debut. He was retained by the team for 2022 before signing with the Trinbago Knight Riders in 2023 as a replacement player. TKR re-signed him for the 2024 season. He went back to the Saint Lucia Kings in 2025.

=== Abu Dhabi T10 (2022, 2025) ===
David made his debut for the Dehli Bulls in the 2022 season of the Abu Dhabi T10. During his first match, he scored 42 runs off 18 balls in an innings that included five fours and four sixes. He returned to the series in 2025 with the (now renamed) UAE Bulls. He scored the most runs of any player during the season and secured the team their first title with 98 runs in just 30 balls during the season finale.

=== SA20 (2023) ===
David played for MI Cape Town during the second half of the inaugural season as a replacement player following the 2022–23 Big Bash League season.

=== Major League Cricket (2023–2024) ===
David was bought by MI New York for the inaugural season of the Major League Cricket. He was the fifth highest run-scorer of the season, scoring 209 over the tournament. He was retained by the team for the 2024 season.

=== International League T20 (2024–2025/26) ===
David signed to MI Emirates as a wildcard player for the 2024 International League T20. He moved to the Gulf Giants in 2025 and was bought by the Sharjah Warriorz for the 2025–26 season. He only played three matches in both seasons due to conflicts with the 2024–25 and 2025–26 Big Bash League seasons, respectively.

== International career ==
=== Singapore (2019–2020) ===
In July 2019, David was added to a training squad for the Singapore national cricket team ahead of the Regional Finals of the 2018–19 ICC T20 World Cup Asia Qualifier tournament. Later the same month, he was named in Singapore's Twenty20 International (T20I) squad for the Regional Finals of the tournament. He made his T20I debut for Singapore against Qatar on 22 July 2019.

In September 2019, David was named in Singapore's squad for the 2019 Malaysia Cricket World Cup Challenge League A tournament. He made his List A debut for Singapore, against Qatar, in the Cricket World Cup Challenge League A tournament on 17 September 2019. He was the leading run-scorer in the tournament, with 369 runs in five matches. In October 2019, he was named in Singapore's squad for the 2019 ICC T20 World Cup Qualifier tournament in the United Arab Emirates. Ahead of the tournament, the International Cricket Council (ICC) named him as the player to watch in Singapore's squad. In March 2020, he scored 92* off 32 balls against Malaysia for his fifth consecutive half-century representing Singapore.

=== Australia (2022–present) ===
In 2022, David was named in the Australian national cricket team's squad for the 2022 T20 World Cup and their series against India. Under the ICC's rules, he was deemed eligible to play for Australia despite having previously played for Singapore. He made his T20I debut for Australia against India on 20 September 2022. In his third match for Australia, he hit 54 off 27 balls in Hyderabad against India.

In 2023, he made his One Day International debut, playing against South Africa.

In May 2024, he was named in Australia's squad for the 2024 T20 World Cup tournament.

On 25 July 2025, David scored his first T20I century against the West Indies scoring 102* from only 37 deliveries, making this the joint third fastest T20I century in matches between two full members of the ICC on record. His innings included 11 sixes and 6 fours.

David was named for Australia's 2026 Men's T20 World Cup squad in January of that year. He was named the Australian Men's Twenty20 International Player of the Year in 2026.

== Records and achievements ==
During the third T20I against the West Indies, David became the fastest Australian to score a century, scoring 102* from 37 deliveries.

=== International centuries ===
==== T20 International centuries ====
Runs	Match	Opponents	City	Venue	Year
102*	56 (Note: 42nd match for Australia.)	West Indies	Basseterre, Saint Kitts and Nevis	Warner Park Sporting Complex	2025

== Honours ==
=== Individual ===
- Australian Men's Twenty20 International Player of the Year: 2026

=== Team ===
==== Domestic/franchise ====
- Big Bash League: 2024–25
- Indian Premier League: 2025, 2026
- The Hundred: 2021
