= Scott Gourlay =

Scottish cricketer

Personal information
- Born: 8 January 1971 (age 55); Kirkcaldy, Fife, Scotland
- Batting: Right-handed
- Bowling: Right-arm medium
- Role: All-rounder

International information
- National side: Scotland (1995–1999)
- Source: CricketArchive, 2 February 2016

Scott Gourlay (born 8 January 1971) is a former Scottish international cricketer who represented the Scottish national side between 1995 and 1999. He played as an all-rounder, bowling right-arm medium pace and batting right-handed.

Gourlay was born in Kirkcaldy, and attended Bell Baxter High School in Cupar. His club cricket was played for the Freuchie Cricket Club. Gourlay made his debut for Scotland at the 1995 British Isles Championship, against Ireland. He made his List A debut the following year, playing three games in the 1996 Benson & Hedges Cup. At the 1997 ICC Trophy in Malaysia, Gourlay played in six of Scotland's nine matches, and took eight wickets. His best performance, 3/26 from 9.2 overs, came against Kenya, while he also took 2/62 from seven overs against Bangladesh. Gourlay's final matches for Scotland came at the 1999 NatWest Trophy, where the team made the third round for the first time.
