= Graham Wilson =

Graham Wilson may refer to:

- Graham Wilson (rugby league) (1939–2005), Australian rugby league footballer
- Graham Wilson (cricketer) (born 1970), former English cricketer
- Sir Graham Selby Wilson (1895–1987), bacteriologist
- Graham Malcolm Wilson (1917–1977), British physician and pioneer of clinical pharmacology

== See also ==
- Graeme Wilson (disambiguation)
- Grahame Wilson, Rhodesian Army officer
