= Asim Khan (cricketer) =

Dutch cricketer (1962–2024)

Personal information
- Full name: Khan Asim Khan
- Born: 14 February 1962; Lahore, West Pakistan, Pakistan
- Died: 25 September 2024 (aged 62); Lahore, Punjab, Pakistan
- Batting: Right-handed
- Bowling: Right-arm medium

International information
- National side: Netherlands

Career statistics
Competition	List A	ICC Trophy
Matches	16	15
Runs scored	34	88
Batting average	5.66	14.66
100s/50s	0/0	0/0
Top score	11	48*
Balls bowled	925	727
Wickets	22	28
Bowling average	25.77	13.60
5 wickets in innings	0	1
10 wickets in match	0	0
Best bowling	4/40	7/9
Catches/stumpings	2/–	2/–
- Source: CricketArchive, 17 January 2011

Asim Khan (Urdu: عاصم خان; 14 February 1962 – 25 September 2024) was a Pakistani-born Dutch cricketer. He played 51 times for The Netherlands between 1994 and 2002, including two ICC Trophy tournaments in 1997 and 2001. In the first of those two tournaments he took 7/9 against East & Central Africa, which remains the best bowling figures by a Dutch player in the ICC Trophy.

In the Netherlands, Khan played for VRA, Gandhi, Kampong, and VVV, among others.

Khan served as the assistant coach of the national Under-19 Cricket team of the Netherlands, which was to participate in the ICC Europe Division 2 Qualification round for the World Cup in 2020.

Khan died in Lahore on 25 September 2024, at the age of 62.
