= East Africa team =

East Africa team may refer to one of the following sport teams in the region:

- East and Central Africa cricket team (1989–2003)
- East Africa cricket team (1966–1989)
- East Africa rugby union team
