= Abdul Islam Nazir =

Pakistani cricketer (born 1973)

Abdul Islam Nazir (born 7 July 1973 in Lahore) is a Pakistani former first-class cricketer active 1996–1998 who played for Lahore City. He was a right-handed batsman and a right-arm fast medium pace bowler. He represented the United States of America in the 1997 ICC Trophy.
