= Paul McCrum =

Irish cricketer (born 1962)

Personal information
- Full name: Paul McCrum
- Born: 11 August 1962 (age 64); Waringstown, County Down, Northern Ireland
- Batting: Right-handed
- Bowling: Right-arm fast-medium
- Role: Bowler

Domestic team information
- Years: Team
- 1990–1998: Ireland
- 1998: Northern Ireland
- FC debut: 11 August 1990 Ireland v Scotland
- Last FC: 9 August 1997 Ireland v Scotland
- LA debut: 27 June 1990 Ireland v Sussex
- Last LA: 10 September 1998 Northern Ireland v South Africa

Career statistics
Competition	FC	LA	ICC T
Matches	4	17	11
Runs scored	49	44	14
Batting average	16.33	5.50	7.00
100s/50s	0/0	0/0	0/0
Top score	44*	16	7*
Balls bowled	588	852	450
Wickets	5	21	15
Bowling average	68.60	31.85	18.26
5 wickets in innings	0	0	0
10 wickets in match	0	0	0
Best bowling	3/56	3/26	4/51
Catches/stumpings	0/0	5/0	4/0
- Source: CricketArchive, 24 November 2007

Paul McCrum (born 1962) is a Northern Irish former cricketer. A right-handed batsman and right-arm fast-medium bowler, he played 74 times for the Ireland cricket team between 1989 and 1998 including four first-class matches against Scotland and 16 List A matches. He also played for the Northern Ireland national cricket team in the cricket tournament at the 1998 Commonwealth Games.

== Career ==
Born 11 August 1962 in Waringstown, County Down, Northern Ireland, McCrum made his debut for Ireland in May 1989 when he played two matches against Northamptonshire. He next played the following year in two matches against New Zealand and two against Worcestershire. After a match against the MCC in Coleraine he made his List A debut against Sussex in a NatWest Trophy match in June 1990. This was followed by a match against Wales in July and his first-class debut against Scotland in August.

He went on an Irish tour to Zimbabwe in March 1991, averaging 29.91 with the ball on the tour, returning home to play against Middlesex, Free Foresters, the Duchess of Norfolk's XI, the MCC at Lord's and Wales. The following year, he played against Middlesex, Scotland, Durham, the MCC and twice against an England amateur XI.

In 1993 Ireland gained associate membership of the International Cricket Council and McCrum was a regular member of the side at the time, playing nine times that year, including internationals against Scotland, Australia, Wales and the Netherlands. He only appeared three times the following year however, playing against Papua New Guinea, Gibraltar and the UAE in the 1994 ICC Trophy, and he did not play at all in 1995.

He returned to a regular place in the team in 1996, starting that year with four matches in the Benson & Hedges Cup. This was followed by matches against Wales and the MCC before a NatWest Trophy match against Sussex in Belfast. He then played for Ireland in the Triple Crown Tournament in Wales and European Championship.

In 1997, he represented Ireland at the 1997 ICC Trophy in Kuala Lumpur, before matches in the summer against Middlesex, Somerset and Glamorgan in the Benson & Hedges Cup and against Yorkshire in the NatWest Trophy. He then played again in the Triple Crown Tournament before finishing the year with his final first-class match against Scotland and a match against the MCC at Lord's. The following year would be the end of his international career. Following three matches in the Benson & Hedges Cup, he played a match against Wales before finishing his Ireland career against South Africa. Though he never played again for the full Ireland team, he did play for Northern Ireland at the 1998 Commonwealth Games in Malaysia, playing once against South Africa.

== Statistics ==
In all matches for Ireland, Paul McCrum scored 355 runs at an average of 15.43, with a top score of 63 against Wales in July 1991, his only half-century. He took 106 wickets at an average of 32.32, with a best bowling performance of 5/52 against the MCC in June 1996, the only time he took five wickets in an innings. He is one of only 15 players to take 100 wickets for Ireland.
