= Søren Henriksen =

Danish cricketer (born 1963)

Personal information
- Full name: Søren Henriksen
- Born: 1 December 1964 (age 61); Rødovre, Denmark
- Batting: Right-handed
- Bowling: Right-arm fast-medium
- Relatives: Mads Henriksen and Jonas Henriksen (sons)

International information
- National side: Denmark

Domestic team information
- Years: Team
- 1985–1986: Lancashire

Career statistics
| Competition | First-class | List A |
|---|---|---|
| Matches | 3 | 10 |
| Runs scored | 17 | 2 |
| Batting average | 17.00 | 2.00 |
| 100s/50s | –/– | –/– |
| Top score | 10* | 1* |
| Balls bowled | 174 | 426 |
| Wickets | 2 | 6 |
| Bowling average | 52.50 | 54.83 |
| 5 wickets in innings | – | – |
| 10 wickets in match | – | – |
| Best bowling | 1/26 | 2/51 |
| Catches/stumpings | 2/– | –/– |
- Source: Cricinfo, 16 September 2012

Søren Henriksen (born 1 December 1963 in Rødovre) is a former Danish cricketer, who has played for the national team. Henriksen was a right-handed batsman who bowled right-arm fast-medium.

== Career ==
=== Early career and Lancashire ===
Henriksen made his debut for Denmark Under-19s against Bermuda Under-19s in the 1981 International Youth Tournament. He made two further appearances for Denmark Under-19s in the 1983 International Youth Tournament, against Ireland Under-19s and Bermuda Under-19s, a tournament in which he came to the attention of English county Lancashire. Signed by Lancashire in 1983, his first-class debut for the county came in the 1985 County Championship against Surrey at The Oval, making him the second Dane after Ole Mortensen to play county cricket. He took his first wicket in this match, when he dismissed Trevor Jesty. In that same season, he made his List A debut against Worcestershire in the 1985 Benson & Hedges Cup. He made eight further appearances in List A cricket in that season, taking 6 wickets at an average of 53.66, with best figures of 2/51. The following season, he made two further first-class appearances in the County Championship against Worcestershire and Derbyshire, going wicketless against Worcestershire, but taking his second and final first-class wicket against Derbyshire when he dismissed Kim Barnett. He also made a single List A appearance against Derbyshire in the John Player Special League, going wicketless in the match. He left Lancashire at the end of the 1986 season.

=== Later career ===
He made his debut for Denmark against Argentina in the 1986 ICC Trophy, a tournament in which he made a total of eight appearances, taking 10 wickets at an average of 19.80, with best figures of 4/26. With the bat, he scored 258 runs at an average of 34.00, with a high score of 56. One of two half centuries he made in the tournament, his highest score came against Argentina. Henriksen ended the tournament as Denmark's leading run-scorer and second highest wicket-taker. He next appeared for Denmark against the Netherlands in 1989, in that same year he also played in two friendly matches against the touring Australians, who had just finished their successful Ashes series against England. He captained Denmark in these two matches, having succeeded the captaincy from Troel Nielsen. The following year, he captained Denmark in the 1990 ICC Trophy, however an injury during the tournament meant the only played two matches against East and Central Africa and Gibraltar, with Søren Mikkelsen captaining the side in his absence.

He returned to the Danish side in 1991, playing against the Netherlands and touring England, where he played in a friendly against Durham (then still a minor county). The following year, he played in two matches against the touring Wales side. He was a part of Denmark's squad for the 1994 ICC Trophy in Kenya, however he did not captain the team, with Mogens Seider fulfilling that role. Henriksen made six appearances during the tournament, taking 12 wickets at an average of 14.75, with best figures of 5/56. These figures came against Fiji. With the bat, he scored 97 runs at an average of 19.40, with a high score of 36. In July 1994, he captained Denmark in the 1994 European Quadrangular Tournament, which also featured Scotland and the Netherlands, with him also captaining Denmark in the following years Quadrangular Tournament, which featured Scotland and Scotland B.

He captained Denmark in the 1996 European Championship, making four appearances in the tournament. The following year, he captained Denmark in his fourth and final ICC Trophy appearance, making nine appearances in the tournament, the last of which came against the Netherlands. Playing more in the role of a specialist batsman during the tournament, he scored 99 runs at an average of 14.14, with a high score of 42. He did bowl four overs in the tournament, taking a single wicket. Denmark ended the tournament in fifth place, with Henriksen retiring from playing shortly thereafter. He made a total of 25 ICC Trophy appearances, scoring 459 runs at an average of 22.95, while with the ball he took 27 wickets at an average of 16.14. He was succeeded as captain by Morten Hedegaard. After his playing career he moved into coaching.
