= Pineo =

Pineo may refer to:

== People ==
- Abraham Pineo Gesner (1797–1864), Canadian physician and geologist
- Henry Gesner Pineo Jr. (1830–1874), Canadian politician
- Richard Pineo (born 1975), English cricket player

== Places ==
- Pineo, Spain
