= Brian Millar =

Irish cricketer

Personal information
- Full name: Robert Brian Millar
- Born: 22 April 1966 (age 60); Belfast, Northern Ireland
- Batting: Right-handed
- Role: Wicket-keeper

Career statistics
Competition	FC	List A
Matches	1	4
Runs scored	–	4
Batting average	–	1.33
100s/50s	–/–	0/0
Top score	–	4
Catches/stumpings	2/0	0/1
- Source: Cricinfo, 13 December 2025

Robert Brian Millar (born 22 April 1966) is a former Irish international cricketer who represented the Irish national side between 1992 and 1995. He played as a wicket-keeper.

Millar was born in Belfast, Northern Ireland. He made his debut for Ireland in August 1992, in a single-innings game against Gloucestershire. At the 1994 ICC Trophy in Kenya, Millar appeared in two of his team's seven matches (against Malaysia and the Netherlands), alternating with Paul Jackson as wicket-keeper. He made his first-class debut later in the year, against Scotland, and also represented Ireland in the 1994 NatWest Trophy (an English domestic one-day competition). Millar's final games for Ireland came in the 1995 Benson & Hedges Cup.
