= Imran Brohi =

Pakistani cricketer

Personal information
- Full name: Imran Ahmed Brohi
- Born: 1 October 1963 (age 63); Hyderabad, Pakistan
- Batting: Right-handed
- Role: Batsman

International information
- National side: East and Central Africa (1994–1997)

Domestic team information
- Years: Team
- 1982: South Zone
- 1985: Hyderabad

Career statistics
Competition	List A	ICC Trophy
Matches	4	13
Runs scored	53	291
Batting average	13.25	24.25
100s/50s	0/0	1/0
Top score	40	141
Balls bowled	18	174
Wickets	0	6
Bowling average	–	17.16
5 wickets in innings	–	0
10 wickets in match	–	0
Best bowling	–	3/6
Catches/stumpings	0/–	4/–
- Source: CricketArchive, 8 April 2015

Imran Ahmed Brohi (born 1 October 1963) is a Pakistani former cricketer who played domestic matches for Hyderabad and South Zone. While resident in Malawi during the 1990s, he played for East and Central Africa, including at the 1994 and 1997 ICC Trophies.

Born in Hyderabad District, Imran made his List A debut for South Zone during the 1981–82 season, playing three matches in the Wills Cup. That season's tournament was the only edition to feature a South Zone side, and none of the team's players had previous list-A experience. A right-handed batsman, on debut against Karachi Imran scored a duck, coming in third in the batting order. He followed this with 13 runs against Habib Bank, and another duck, against United Bank. In the latter match he was one of four South Zone players to be dismissed without scoring, as the team was bowled out for 61.

Imran played no further high-level matches until the 1984–85 season, when he appeared once for Hyderabad in the President's Trophy one-day tournament. In the match, played against Quetta in March 1985, he top-scored with 40 runs in Hyderabad's innings of 140 all out, which was to be his highest list-A score. Imran maintained his involvement with cricket after moving to Malawi for work, and subsequently gained selection for East and Central Africa, a combined team featuring players from Malawi, Tanzania, Uganda, and Zambia. He made his competitive debut for them at the 1994 ICC Trophy in Kenya, playing in all seven of the team's matches. Against Singapore, he scored 141 runs out of a total of 266/8, helping East and Central Africa to its first victory of the tournament.

Imran's innings set a record (never beaten) for the highest score by an East and Central Africa player in any ICC Trophy, and was the second-highest score by any player at the 1994 tournament, behind only Maurice Odumbe's 158 not out against Bermuda. He was easily East and Central Africa's leading run-scorer at the tournament, with 221 runs from six innings, over 100 runs more than the next-best player. He also took three wickets in the tournament with limited bowling time, including 2/17 from a five-over spell against Argentina. Aged 33, Imran was appointed captain of East and Central Africa for the 1997 ICC Trophy in Malaysia. Both he and his team had little success at the tournament, and his best performance came as a bowler, when he took 3/6 against West Africa in the 17th-place playoff (the only match his team won).
