= Ian Beven =

Tasmanian-born Scottish cricketer (born 1958)

Cricket information
- Batting: Left-handed
- Bowling: Right-arm off-break

Career statistics
Competition	First-class	List A
Matches	19	13
Runs scored	605	144
Batting average	17.79	13.09
100s/50s	0/2	0/0
Top score	57	31
Balls bowled	1,759	526
Wickets	12	6
Bowling average	68.00	69.83
5 wickets in innings	0	0
10 wickets in match	0	0
Best bowling	2/31	3/34
Catches/stumpings	13/–	3/–
- Source: CricketArchive, 10 October 2022

Ian Robert Beven (born 27 November 1958 in Hobart) is a former first class cricketer. He was brought up in Tasmania, whom he represented in the Sheffield Shield between 1980/81 and 1983/84.

In 1983 he moved to Scotland and played club cricket. He became a permanent citizen and took a wicket with his first ball for Scotland, trapping Test player Roland Butcher LBW. He went on to appear 27 times for Scotland and he helped them reach the 1999 World Cup by taking 17 wickets in their ICC Trophy campaign.
