= Rod David =

Singaporean cricketer (born 1963)

Personal information
- Full name: Roderick David
- Born: 26 August 1963 (age 63); Sydney, New South Wales, Australia
- Batting: Right-handed
- Bowling: Right-arm medium

Roderick David (born 26 August 1963) is an Australian-born Singaporean former cricketer who played for Singapore national cricket team, and the father of Australian national cricket team player Tim David. He was included in the Singapore team for the 1997 ICC Trophy.

== Playing career ==
During the 1997 ICC Trophy, he contributed for the team with a match winning bowling figures of 3 for 19 in a match against Malaysia. He finished that tournament with 4 wickets at a bowling average of 29.75.

== Personal life ==
David moved to Singapore from Australia in the 1990s where he worked as an engineer. David moved back to Australia in the wake of the Asian Financial Crisis in 1997, when his son Tim was two years old. Tim grew up in Perth and is also a cricketer.
