= Baljit Singh (Danish cricketer) =

Danish cricketer (born 1977)

Personal information
- Born: 23 February 1977 (age 49); Frederiksberg, Denmark
- Batting: Right-handed
- Bowling: Right-arm medium

Career statistics
Competition	List A
Matches	8
Runs scored	217
Batting average	31.00
100s/50s	0/2
Top score	58
Catches/stumpings	5/1
- Source: CricketArchive, 15 April 2023

Baljit Singh (born 23 February 1977) is a Danish cricketer who played for Denmark in the Cheltenham and Gloucester Trophy and ICC Trophy. He was born at Frederiksberg A right-handed batsman, he accumulated 217 runs in 8 List A matches, with a batting average of 31 runs per innings.
