= Richard M. Cox =

English cricketer, coach, and administrator

Richard Cox
Personal information
- Full name: Richard Martin Cox
- Born: 12 March 1963 (age 63); Birmingham, Warwickshire, England
- Batting: Right-handed
- Bowling: Right-arm off-break

Domestic team information
- Years: Team
- 1992–1995: Herefordshire
- 1998: Warwickshire Cricket Board
- Source: ESPNcricinfo, 2 April 2016

Richard Martin Cox (born 12 March 1963) is an English cricketer who has also worked as a coach and administrator. He played Minor Counties cricket for Herefordshire, and has served in various administrative roles, most notably as CEO of the Royal Dutch Cricket Board between 2009 and 2015.

Cox returned to the UK to head up Cricket Shropshire as General Manager in April 2015. He was then recruited to the ECB as Regional Manager for the West Midlands beginning in November 2016, a position he held until December 2020.

From 2021 he has been integrally involved in the development of Blind Summit Coaching Training and Management nurturing a number of projects across the game as a consultant. In the autumn of 2022, he took on the role as Lead Officer of Herefordshire Cricket on an interim basis before subsequently being appointed as General Manager for the County.

He retains other roles in Cricket currently most notably with the England and Wales Cricket Board (ECB), Cyprus Cricket Federation and Club Cricket.

== Playing career ==
Cox was born in Birmingham, and attended King Edward's School. In 1992 to 1995, he represented Herefordshire in the Minor Counties Championship and MCCA Trophy.

In 1998, Cox also played in the latter competition for the Warwickshire Cricket Board. His club cricket was played in the Birmingham and District League, for West Bromwich Dartmouth, Harborne (2000) and Halesowen clubs. A longtime member of the Marylebone Cricket Club, Cox was a member of an MCC side that toured Gibraltar in 1993, playing a series of matches against local teams.

Throughout this Cox remained an active cricketer in the Birmingham and District Premier League. During the period winning 15 titles in all whilst at West Bromwich Dartmouth and Halesowen. He also recently coached Halesowen CC to the Worcestershire County Cup and Division 1 promotion titles whilst representing Shropshire and then latterly Worcestershire in the ECB 50+ County Championships. Cox is an ECB Level 4 (Master) Coach and Mentor to coaches across the ECB Coach Development Programme.

== Coaching career ==
Cox was the first ever ECB Level 4 Coach in Warwickshire whilst being a Senior Staff Coach and Educator for ECB. In 1992 he was invited to coach the Gibraltar national team, with his first major tournament in charge being the 1994 ICC Trophy in Kenya. He also served as Gibraltar's coach at the 1997 and 2001 editions of the ICC Trophy, as well as various European competitions. In 2001 and 2003 Gibraltar won the European Division 2 titles under Cox's tutelage.

During his other coaching activities Cox's notable achievements included overseeing the production line of players at Warwickshire notably Wagh, Singh, Powell, Troughton, Bell and Westwood and more latterly Woakes and Moeen Ali. He was also appointed and ran the ICC Europe Academies for men and women from 1999 to 2009 whilst picking up coaching experience in many countries around the world. During his time in Holland he coached the Dutch Women's teams to European Championship success in 2012 and ECB T20 tournament successes in 2013 and 2014.

In 2018 Cox was appointed to the position of National Coach of the Cyprus team that competed in the ICC T20I World Cup Qualifier in the Netherlands and in 2022 a similar qualification event in Finland. In 2021 he worked in the Central Sparks Womens Academy Coaching Team as Asst Coach.

In addition to his role in Cyprus he has acted as a Cricket Advisor to the Estonian Cricket Association (ECA) across tournaments and matchplay programmes. In 2022 Cox began to specialise in T10 Franchise Cricket with inaugural events in the European Cricket League based at Cartama Oval in Andalucia, Spain. Firstly with Punjab Lions who were narrowly defeated in the finals and more latterly with Estonian debutants Tallinn Stallions. Part of his tenure was as Head Coach to the mens team which saw them rise 28 places in the ICC T20I rankings before he departed in December 2025 due to financial restrictions within the ECA. Cox - Estonia

Outside of the touchline of Cricket he remains a mentor to ECB Level 3 (Advanced) and Level 4 (Specialist) coaches working alongside many current players and coaches at first class clubs as well as the Women's Game. As a result of that in November 2024 Cox was invited to become an ICC (International Cricket Council) Master Coach Educator alongside 14 others from around the world. His experience with ECB/ICC and the Associate Member cricket world resulted in him being the first Educator to deliver the world-renowned ICC Level 3 Coaching course in Bahrain in May 2025 alongside colleagues from Cricket Australia, ICC, and Cricket South Africa.

== Administration & Playing career ==
Cox started out as Cricket Development Officer in 1989 at Warwickshire County Cricket Club. He was one of the first 4 appointed across the UK at the time. During his 22-year stint at Edgbaston Cox moved from this role to Director of Youth cricket and then Director of Cricket. In this period he oversaw the co-ordination of schools, club and county cricket under one umbrella body known as the Warwickshire Cricket Board. An active Coach Education tutor to this day Cox remains a mentor for aspiring coaches on behalf of ECB and continues to work alongside ECB Level 3 coaches who are forging their career in the game. Cox has served on numerous ECB bodies during his career and in particular a close association with the ECB Birmingham and District Premier Cricket League where he played for 44 seasons until his retirement in 2018.

In 1998, Cox was named Director of the Warwickshire Cricket Board responsible for the administration of all Recreational cricket in Warwickshire. An article in The Independent the following year said the WCB had "actively opened doors" for the British Asian community, setting an example for the rest of England. In 2006, Cox was additionally named director of the Warwickshire County Cricket Club's academy. He held both roles as well as a management board position at Warwickshire County Cricket Club until July 2009, when a reorganization was carried out that eliminated his positions.

He quickly acquired the post of Director of Cricket at the locally renowned sporting and academic institution Bromsgrove School where he coached Cricket and Badminton until December 2009.

In January 2010, Cox was appointed chief executive officer of the Royal Dutch Cricket Board, the governing body of cricket in the Netherlands. He remained in the position until his resignation in January 2015. During his tenure, Cox emphasised the need to professionalise the sport in the Netherlands, and to build ties with the England and Wales Cricket Board. One of his initiatives was to establish the North Sea Pro Series with Scotland, the first professional competition for Dutch players. It was during his tenure that Cox was instrumental in pushing for full time player contracts that coincided with the Netherlands being invited in to the ECBs Pro 40 Competition sponsored by Clydesdale Bank. Cox's lasting legacy was to see the National Team compete on the International stage amongst its counterparts with some success.

On his return to the UK he was engaged as General Manager of Cricket Shropshire. Cox's resurrection of the fortunes of Cricket Shropshire saw a quick turn-round in the playing and financial fortunes both on and off the field and as a result he was recruited by ECB into the role of Regional Manager for the West Midlands to oversee the ECB's new five-year plan - Cricket Unleashed. With some success Cox then turned his attentions to the next phase of the ECB Plans for 'Inspiring Generations' as he oversaw a change in Governance of the game across the West Midlands to ensure growth and increased participation across a number of sectors of the sport.

In 2017 Cox was recruited to assess and reform the ECB Birmingham and District Premier Cricket League which resulted in wide-ranging changes for nearly 400 clubs and 5 County Cricket Leagues across the West Midlands in the re-formatting of League Cricket. Cox entitled the work 'The Blueprint' and completed it in 2018. The new structure commenced in 2019 with expectations high on the future of the club cricket game. Covid played its part in 2020 and 2021 in the setting of the League set-ups but in 2022 he was once again engaged to drive up standards across off-the-field activities of the clubs auditing and analysing the health of the clubs.

It was 2021 that saw Cox elected to the Board of the Birmingham and District League to support the improvement of facilities and clubs which coincided with his move from ECB in December 2021. Quickly he began to work with various partners to support Cricket Admin and Coaching as part of Blind Summit Coaching Training and Management. He currently occupies the seat of Head of Development covering Governance, Sports Admin, Coaching and Coach Development often supporting various ECB programmes. Other areas of the business include Education to 18+ as well as Health and Welfare of SEND students.

In the autumn of 2022, Cox returned to his former County Herefordshire as Interim Lead Officer for Cricket in the County whilst an external review of Cricket structures was being conducted with a view to a new strategic way forward for the county. His immediate impact was to re-jig the Marches League programme to one attuned to Worcestershire Cricket whilst it retained its identity and profile. In 2023 Cox was appointed General Manager - Operations of Herefordshire Cricket Ltd.
