= Jonas Henriksen (cricketer) =

Danish cricketer (born 2000)

Personal information
- Full name: Jonas Strandby Henriksen
- Born: 17 April 2000 (age 26); Rødovre, Denmark
- Batting: Right-handed
- Bowling: Right-arm Medium-pace
- Role: Bowler
- Relatives: Søren Henriksen (father); Mads Henriksen (brother)

International information
- National side: Denmark
- T20I debut (cap 31): 21 July 2023 v Ireland
- Last T20I: 23 July 2023 v Germany
- T20I shirt no.: 82
- Source: Cricinfo, 14 May 2019

Jonas Henriksen (born 17 April 2000) is a Danish cricketer, who plays for Denmark's national cricket team. In April 2018, he was named in Denmark's squad for the 2018 ICC World Cricket League Division Four tournament in Malaysia. He played in Denmark's fourth match of the tournament, against Uganda.

In September 2018, Henriksen was named in Denmark's squad for the 2018 ICC World Cricket League Division Three tournament in Oman. In May 2019, he was named in Denmark's squad for a five-match series against Leinster Lightning in Ireland, in preparation for the Regional Finals of the 2018–19 ICC T20 World Cup Europe Qualifier tournament in Guernsey.

In August 2019, he was named in Denmark's squad for the 2019 Malaysia Cricket World Cup Challenge League A tournament. He made his List A debut against Malaysia, in the Cricket World Cup Challenge League A tournament on 16 September 2019. Henriksen did not have much of an impact in his debut match; his 3 overs cost 25 runs for no wicket and he got out for a first-ball duck. Malaysia won the match by 44 runs.
