= Graeme Wilson =

Graeme Wilson may refer to:

- Graeme Wilson (translator) (1919–1992), British academic and translator
- Graeme Wilson (diplomat) (1953–2014), Australian rules footballer and diplomat

== See also ==
- Graham Wilson (disambiguation)
