= Mogens Christiansen =

Danish cricketer (born 1972)

Personal information
- Full name: Mogens Stenumgaard Christiansen
- Born: 10 January 1972 (age 54); Herning, Denmark
- Batting: Left-handed

International information
- National side: Denmark

Domestic team information
- Years: Team
- 2001: Denmark

Career statistics
Competition	List A
Matches	1
Runs scored	9
Batting average	9.00
100s/50s	0/0
Top score	9
Catches/stumpings	0/–
- Source: Cricinfo, 15 January 2011

Mogens Stenumgaard Christiansen (born 10 January 1972) is a Danish former cricketer. Christiansen was a left-handed batsman. He was born at Herning.

Christiansen first played for Denmark Under-19s in the 1991 International Youth Tournament, making two appearances against Bermuda and Ireland. He made his senior debut for Denmark in the 1994 ICC Trophy, playing four matches against Bermuda, Israel, Malaysia and Namibia. His next appearance for Denmark came against the Somerset Second XI in 1997. His next appearance after this came in August 2001, when he played a List A match against Suffolk in the 1st round of English domestic cricket's 2002 Cheltenham & Gloucester Trophy, which was played in 2001 to avoid fixture congestion in 2002. In the match, held at Old London Road in Copdock, Suffolk, Denmark won the toss and elected to bat first, making 112 all out from 28.4 overs against their minor county opponents, with Christiansen scoring 9 runs before he was dismissed by Richard Pineo. Suffolk won the match by 7 wickets. This was his last appearance for Denmark.
