= Delano Hollis =

Bermudian cricketer (born 1969)

Personal information
- Full name: Delano Wayne Hollis
- Born: 17 September 1969 (age 57); Bermuda
- Batting: Right-handed
- Bowling: Right-arm off break

International information
- National side: Bermuda

Domestic team information
- Years: Team
- 1997/98: Bermuda

Career statistics
Competition	List A
Matches	3
Runs scored	7
Batting average	7.00
100s/50s	0/0
Top score	7*
Balls bowled	102
Wickets	2
Bowling average	53.00
5 wickets in innings	0
10 wickets in match	0
Best bowling	1/12
Catches/stumpings	1/–
- Source: CricketArchive, 13 October 2011

Delano Wayne Hollis (born 17 September 1969) is a former Bermudian cricketer. He was a right-handed batsman and a right-arm off-break bowler. He played three List A matches for Bermuda in the 1997 Red Stripe Bowl, also representing them in the 1997 ICC Trophy.
