= Tuanku Ja'afar Cup =

The Tuanku Ja'afar Cup was a cricket tournament contested by the national sides of Hong Kong, Malaysia, Singapore and Thailand. It is named in honour of the late Tuanku Jaafar, the former Yang di-Pertuan Besar of Negeri Sembilan and Yang di-Pertuan Agong (King of Malaysia) between 1994 and 1999.

== History ==
The tournament was first played in 1991, not involving Thailand, to help the other three countries prepare for the ICC Trophy. Thailand joined the competition in the second year, and the four teams played annually until 2004, with Thailand missing in 1998 and 1999, when just three teams played, and 2002, when they were replaced by Hong Kong A. Hong Kong have won the tournament the most times, winning nine of the 14 tournaments played. Malaysia have won four times, whilst Singapore have won just once.

=== 1991 tournament ===
The first Tuanku Ja'afar Cup was played on a league basis with no final. Hong Kong won the tournament, with Singapore as runners-up.

=== 1992 tournament ===
The second Tuanku Ja'afar Cup saw Thailand play for the first time. Hong Kong were again the winners, with Malaysia runners-up this time.

=== 1993 tournament ===
The 1993 Tuanku Ja'afar Cup was the last to be played without a final. Hong Kong won the third consecutive time. Singapore were runners-up.

=== 1994 tournament ===
The 1994 tournament was the first to have a final after the initial league phase. Hong Kong and Singapore topped the table after the group stage, and with Hong Kong unbeaten on home turf and with a 107 run win over Singapore under their belts, they were favourites to lift the cup, but Singapore triumphed in the final by two wickets.

==== Final result ====
20 November 1994

Hong Kong; 234/8 (50 overs)	v	Singapore; 236/8 (49 overs)
Stewart Brew 73; Kiran Deshpande 3/51		Mohammed Naushad 53

Singapore won by 2 wickets
Wong Chung Nai Gap, Hong Kong

=== 1995 tournament ===
The 1995 tournament was won by Malaysia for the first time. They beat Hong Kong in the final.

=== 1996 tournament ===
The tournament was held in Singapore for the second time in 1996, with Hong Kong beating the hosts by 20 runs in the final. Malaysia finished third and Thailand finished last. The tournament saw some record performances in the match between Hong Kong and Thailand. Hong Kong scored 415/5, the highest team score in the history of the competition. Riaz Farcy scored 178 in that match, the highest individual score in the history of the competition.

==== Final result ====
30 June 1996
Scorecard

Hong Kong; 296/7 (50 overs)	v	Singapore; 277 all out (48.2 overs)
Stewart Brew 88; A Vijay 2/26		A Vijay 61; Mohammad Zubair 3/38

Hong Kong won by 20 runs
CSC, Singapore
Umpires: Rangachari Vijayaraghavan, WAU Wickramasinghe
Player of the match: Rahul Sharma

=== 1997 tournament ===
The 1997 tournament was won by Malaysia for the second time. They beat Singapore in the final. This was the first tournament in which Hong Kong didn't finish in the top two.

=== 1998 tournament ===
Thailand did not participate in the 1998 tournament, with their place taken by a HKCA President's XI. Hong Kong won on home soil, beating Singapore in the final. The KJCA President's XI finished third, with Malaysia in last place.

==== Final result ====
12 June 1998

Hong Kong; 219/9	v	Singapore; 198 all out
Mark Davies 36; Andrew Scott 3/41		Johann Pieris 70; Saleem Malik 3/37

Hong Kong won by 21 runs
Kowloon Cricket Club
Player of the match: Joshua Dearing

=== 1999 tournament ===
The 1999 tournament in Kuala Lumpur was one affected by rain. The first round match between Hong Kong and Malaysia was completely abandoned, and the other two matches were both reduced. The final was washed out in Hong Kong's innings against Malaysia. Hong Kong were awarded the title as they were top of the group stage. Thailand were again absent, but they were not replaced this time.

=== 2000 tournament ===
The 2000 tournament was held in Singapore, and Thailand played for the first time since 1997. Malaysia won the tournament, beating Hong Kong in the final. Singapore finished third and Thailand finished last.

==== Final result ====
21 May 2000

Malaysia; 243 all out	v	Hong Kong; 113 all out
Suresh Navaratnam 49; Sher Lama 4/48		Jawaid Iqbal 42; Ramesh Menon 4/12

Malaysia won by 130 runs
Kallang Cricket Club

=== 2001 tournament ===
Like the 1999 tournament, the 2001 tournament in Thailand was heavily affected by the rain. Hong Kong won the tournament despite only playing one match, due to a superior net run rate in the opening round of matches, which was the only one completed.

=== 2002 tournament ===
The 2002 tournament was hosted and won by Hong Kong, who beat Singapore in the final. Thailand withdrew from the tournament, and were replaced by Hong Kong A. The Hong Kong A side did not participate in the tournament proper, playing unofficial matches against Malaysia and Singapore, though the match against Singapore was rained off.

==== Points table ====
Team	Pts	Pld	W	T	L	NR
Hong Kong	3	2	1	0	0	1
Singapore	2	2	1	0	1	0
Malaysia	1	2	0	0	1	1

==== Final result ====
1 December 2002

Hong Kong; 217/7 (30 overs)	v	Singapore; 169 all out
Rahul Sharma 40; Arun Vijayan 2/38		G Nayarnan 38; Mohammad Zubair 4/17

Hong Kong won by 48 runs
Hong Kong Cricket Club
Player of the match: Mohammad Zubair

- Rain reduced the match to 30 overs per side

=== 2003 tournament ===
The 2003 tournament was held in Kuala Lumpur. Thailand returned after missing the 2002 tournament and Hong Kong won for the third consecutive year, beating Malaysia in the final.

==== Final result ====
7 September 2003

Hong Kong; 218/8 (48 overs)	v	Malaysia; 167/9 (38 overs)
Ilyas Gul 80; Rohan Selvaratnam 2/27		Rakesh Madhavan 40; Ilyas Gul 3/32

Hong Kong won by 16 runs (D/L Method)
RSC, Kuala Lumpur
Player of the match: Ilyas Gul

- Rain meant that Malaysia's target was set at 201 from 38 overs

=== 2004 tournament ===
The final tournament was held in Singapore in May 2004. Malaysia won after beating Hong Kong in the final. With Hong Kong, Malaysia and Singapore having increasing international commitments in tournaments such as the ACC Fast Track Countries Tournament, ACC Twenty20 Cup and ACC Trophy, it seems unlikely that the tournament will return to the schedules.

==== Final result ====
16 May 2004

Hong Kong; 138 all out	v	Malaysia; 139/5
Ilyas Gul 50; S Jayawardhana 3/27		Suresh Navaratnam 60

Malaysia won by 5 wickets
Kallang Cricket Club
Player of the match: Suresh Navaratnam

== Records ==
- Highest team score: 415/5 by Hong Kong against Thailand, 1996
- Lowest team score: 63 all out by Thailand against Malaysia, 2004
- Highest individual score: 178 by Riaz Farcy for Hong Kong against Thailand, 1996
- Best bowling in an innings: 7/15 by Roy Lamsam for Hong Kong against Singapore, 2004

== See also ==
- Saudara Cup – an annual three-day match played between Malaysia and Singapore
- Stan Nagaiah Trophy – an annual series of one-day matches played between Malaysia and Singapore
- ACC Trophy – a biennial one-day tournament involving all national teams from Asia
- ACC Twenty20 Cup – a biennial tournament, similar to the ACC Trophy but playing Twenty20 cricket.
- 2022 Malaysia Quadrangular Series between Malaysia, Thailand, Bhutan and Maldives
