= Mads Henriksen =

Danish cricketer (born 1996)

Personal information
- Full name: Mads Strandby Henriksen
- Born: 29 October 1996 (age 30)
- Relatives: Søren Henriksen (father); Jonas Henriksen (brother)

International information
- National side: Denmark
- Source: Cricinfo, 29 April 2018

Mads Henriksen (born 29 October 1996) is a Danish cricketer. In April 2018, he was named in Denmark's squad for the 2018 ICC World Cricket League Division Four tournament in Malaysia. He played in Denmark's opening match of the tournament, against Bermuda.

In September 2018, Henriksen was the leading run-scorer for Denmark in Group A of the 2018–19 ICC World Twenty20 Europe Qualifier tournament, with 115 runs in five matches. Later the same month, he was named in Denmark's squad for the 2018 ICC World Cricket League Division Three tournament in Oman.

His younger brother Jonas Henriksen is also a Danish cricketer who has played for the national T20I team.
