= Glen Smith (cricketer) =

Bermudian cricketer (born 1973)

Personal information
- Full name: Glen Shane Smith
- Born: 22 January 1973 (age 53); Bailey's Bay, Hamilton Parish, Bermuda
- Batting: Left-handed

International information
- National side: Bermuda

Domestic team information
- Years: Team
- 1996/97: Bermuda

Career statistics
Competition	List A
Matches	1
Runs scored	54
Batting average	54.00
100s/50s	–/1
Top score	54
Balls bowled	–
Wickets	–
Bowling average	–
5 wickets in innings	–
10 wickets in match	–
Best bowling	–
Catches/stumpings	–/–
- Source: CricketArchive, 13 October 2011

Glen Shane Smith (born 22 January 1973 in Bermuda) is a Bermudian cricketer. He is a left-handed batsman. He played in Bermuda's first List A match against the Windward Islands in the 1996 Red Stripe Bowl, scoring 54 runs and winning the man of the match award, but he has not since featured for Bermuda in List A cricket, although he did play in the 1997 ICC Trophy.
