= Bruce Perinchief =

Bermudian cricketer (born 1960)

Personal information
- Full name: Bruce Dwayne Perinchief
- Born: 27 November 1960 (age 65); Paget Parish, Bermuda
- Batting: Right-handed
- Bowling: Leg break googly

International information
- National side: Bermuda

Domestic team information
- Years: Team
- 1996/97: Bermuda

Career statistics
Competition	List A
Matches	3
Runs scored	11
Batting average	–
100s/50s	–/–
Top score	8*
Balls bowled	120
Wickets	–
Bowling average	–
5 wickets in innings	–
10 wickets in match	–
Best bowling	–
Catches/stumpings	–/–
- Source: CricketArchive, 13 October 2011

Bruce Dwayne Perinchief (born 27 November 1960 in Paget, Bermuda) is a former Bermudian cricketer. He was a right-handed batsman and a leg-break bowler. He played three List A matches for Bermuda in the 1996 Red Stripe Bowl, and also played for them in the ICC Trophy in 1994 and 1997.
