= Paul Jackson (Irish cricketer) =

Irish cricketer

Cricket information
- Batting: Right-handed

International information
- National side: Ireland

Career statistics
Competition	First-class	List A
Matches	11	11
Runs scored	244	39
Batting average	20.33	5.57
100s/50s	0/1	0/0
Top score	59	16
Catches/stumpings	19/5	6/1
- Source: CricketArchive, 16 November 2022

Paul Barry Jackson (born 9 December 1959) is an Irish former cricketer. A right-handed batsman and wicket-keeper, he played 87 matches for the Ireland cricket team between 1981 and 1994 including eleven first-class matches against Scotland and eleven List A matches.

== Playing career ==
Born 9 December 1959 in Belfast, Northern Ireland, Jackson made his debut for Ireland in June 1981 against Canada. The following month, he played against Middlesex and made his List A debut against Gloucestershire in the NatWest Trophy and his first-class debut against Scotland. He played three times in August that year, against the MCC at Lord's, Wales and Surrey.

He played four times in 1982, starting with two matches against India in Belfast, followed by matches against Scotland and Warwickshire. He bowled for the first time in 1983, against the MCC in August, the final game of a season that saw him play against Worcestershire, Sussex, Scotland, Gloucestershire and Wales.

The MCC were his first opponents the following year, 1984, followed by matches against the West Indies, Surrey, Wales and Scotland. He played four times for Ireland in 1985 before going on a tour to Zimbabwe in January 1986 on which he took his only wicket for Ireland, against Mashonaland Country Districts. He played several matches at home that year, twice each against India and Yorkshire followed by games against Wales, Leicestershire, the MCC and Scotland.

Several matches were played in 1987, including two against Pakistan. He did not play against any Test-playing opposition in 1988 and 1989, though he did play several games for Ireland against various English county teams, the MCC and Scotland. New Zealand were his Test-playing opponents in 1990, and he again toured Zimbabwe in March 1991. He only played one match at home that year, however, against the West Indies.

His Ireland career was beginning to wind down at this point, though he did play some matches in 1992, against Middlesex, Durham, an England amateur side and the MCC. He played just twice in 1993, his final first-class match against Scotland and a NatWest Trophy match against Yorkshire. He played for Ireland in the 1994 ICC Trophy and in April that year played a Benson & Hedges Cup match against Leicestershire, which was his last for Ireland.

== Statistics ==
In all matches for Ireland, Jackson scored 987 runs at an average of 14.51, with a top score of 89 against Wales in August 1987, one of two half-centuries. He took 103 catches and 29 stumpings. In first-class cricket, he scored 244 runs at an average of 20.33 with a top score of 59 against Scotland in August 1990. He took 19 catches and five stumpings. In List A cricket, he scored 39 runs at an average of 5.57 with a top score of 16 against Derbyshire in 1989. He took six catches and one stumping.
