= Mohammad Saddiq =

Danish cricketer (born 1973)

Personal information
- Full name: Mohammad Saddiq
- Born: 20 September 1973 (age 53); Pakistan
- Batting: Right-handed
- Role: Wicket-keeper

International information
- National side: Denmark

Domestic team information
- Years: Team
- 1999-2001: Denmark

Career statistics
Competition	List A
Matches	6
Runs scored	97
Batting average	19.40
100s/50s	–/–
Top score	36
Balls bowled	–
Wickets	–
Bowling average	–
5 wickets in innings	–
10 wickets in match	–
Best bowling	–
Catches/stumpings	2/–
- Source: Cricinfo, 14 January 2011

Mohammad Saddiq (born 20 September 1973) is a Pakistani-born Danish former cricketer. Saddiq was a right-handed batsman who played as a wicket-keeper.

Saddiq made his debut for Denmark in the 1994 ICC Trophy against Israel. He played 3 further ICC Trophy matches for Denmark, all coming in that competition. Saddiq made his List A debut for Denmark in the 1999 NatWest Trophy against the Kent Cricket Board. His international List A debut for Denmark came in the 2000 ICC Emerging Nations Tournament against Zimbabwe A. During the tournament he played 3 further List A matches against the Netherlands, Scotland and Kenya. Saddiq's final List A match for Denmark came in the 1st round of the 2002 Cheltenham & Gloucester Trophy against Suffolk, which was played in 2001. In his 6 List A matches for Denmark, he scored 97 runs at a batting average of 19.40, with a high score of 36.
