= Mike Smith (Scottish cricketer) =

Scottish cricketer and rugby union player (1966–2026)

Personal information
- Born: 30 March 1966; Edinburgh, Scotland
- Died: 1 March 2026 (aged 59)
- Batting: Right-handed
- Bowling: Right-arm medium

Career statistics
Competition	ODI
Matches	5
Runs scored	19
Batting average	3.80
100s/50s	0/0
Top score	13
Catches/stumpings
- Source: CricInfo, 19 April 2007

Michael Jonathon Smith (30 March 1966 – 1 March 2026) was a Scottish cricketer.

== Biography ==
A right-handed batsman and right-arm medium-pace bowler, Smith made his Scotland debut in 1987 against Ireland, making 79 in the first innings, but was dropped from the side in 1990. He did not make another Scottish appearance until 1994, the year in which he made his top score of 100. Smith appeared in the ICC Trophy in 1997 and was in the 1999 Cricket World Cup squad.

Smith also played some senior-level rugby and later worked as a sales rep.

Smith died on 1 March 2026, at the age of 59.
