= Niels Leemhuis =

Dutch footballer

Personal information
- Date of birth: 28 September 1997 (age 29)
- Place of birth: Almelo, Netherlands
- Height: 1.77 m (5 ft 10 in)
- Position: Attacking midfielder

Team information
- Current team: Excelsior '31
- Number: 20

Senior career*
Years	Team	Apps	(Gls)
2016–2017	Quick '20	15	(0)
2017–2020	Heracles Almelo	2	(0)
2020–	Excelsior '31	91	(2)
- * Club domestic league appearances and goals as of 11 January 2026

Niels Leemhuis (born 28 September 1997) is a Dutch professional footballer who plays as a midfielder for Derde Divisie club Excelsior '31.
