= Selangor State Development Corporation =

State development corporation in Selangor, Malaysia

- Native name: Perbadanan Kemajuan Negeri Selangor
- Company type: Private
- Industry: Real Estate
- Founded: August 1, 1964; 61 years ago
- Headquarters: Shah Alam, Selangor, Malaysia
- Area served: Selangor
- Key people: Amirudin Shari
- Owner: Government of Selangor
- Website: https://www.pkns.gov.my/en/

Selangor State Development Corporation (SSDC) (Malay: Perbadanan Kemajuan Negeri Selangor, abbr:PKNS) is a state development corporation in Selangor, Malaysia. PKNS was established to drive the development of the state, focusing on fair economic prosperity while promoting social well-being and balanced urbanization. It aims to create opportunities, empower communities, and contribute to the sustainable growth of Selangor.

== History ==
PKNS was established on 1 August 1964 under the Selangor State Development Corporation Enactment, 1964 (Sel. Enact.No.4 of 1964) as a statutory body and state-level development agency. Its purpose was to fulfill the aspirations of independence through the distribution and promotion of socio-economic growth across the state of Selangor, guided by government policies to achieve stability, harmony, and social justice in line with the national vision. This mission is carried out through property development, commercial development, industrial development, and investment activities.

== Notable development ==
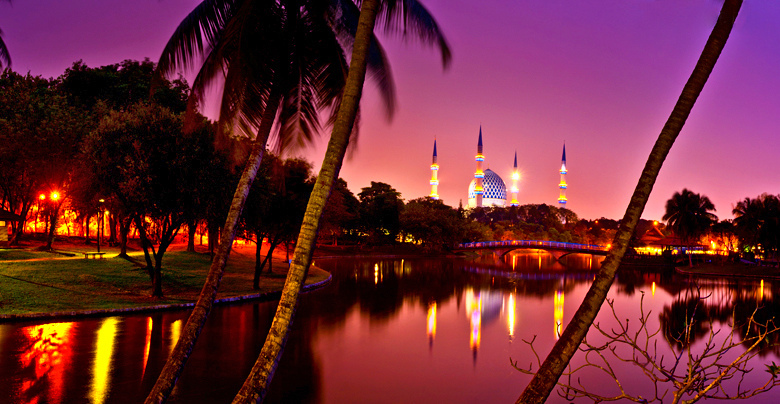
- Shah Alam, Selangor
  Shah Alam, the capital city of Selangor, became the state capital after the purchase of Kuala Lumpur by the Malaysian government. It was developed in the 1960s.
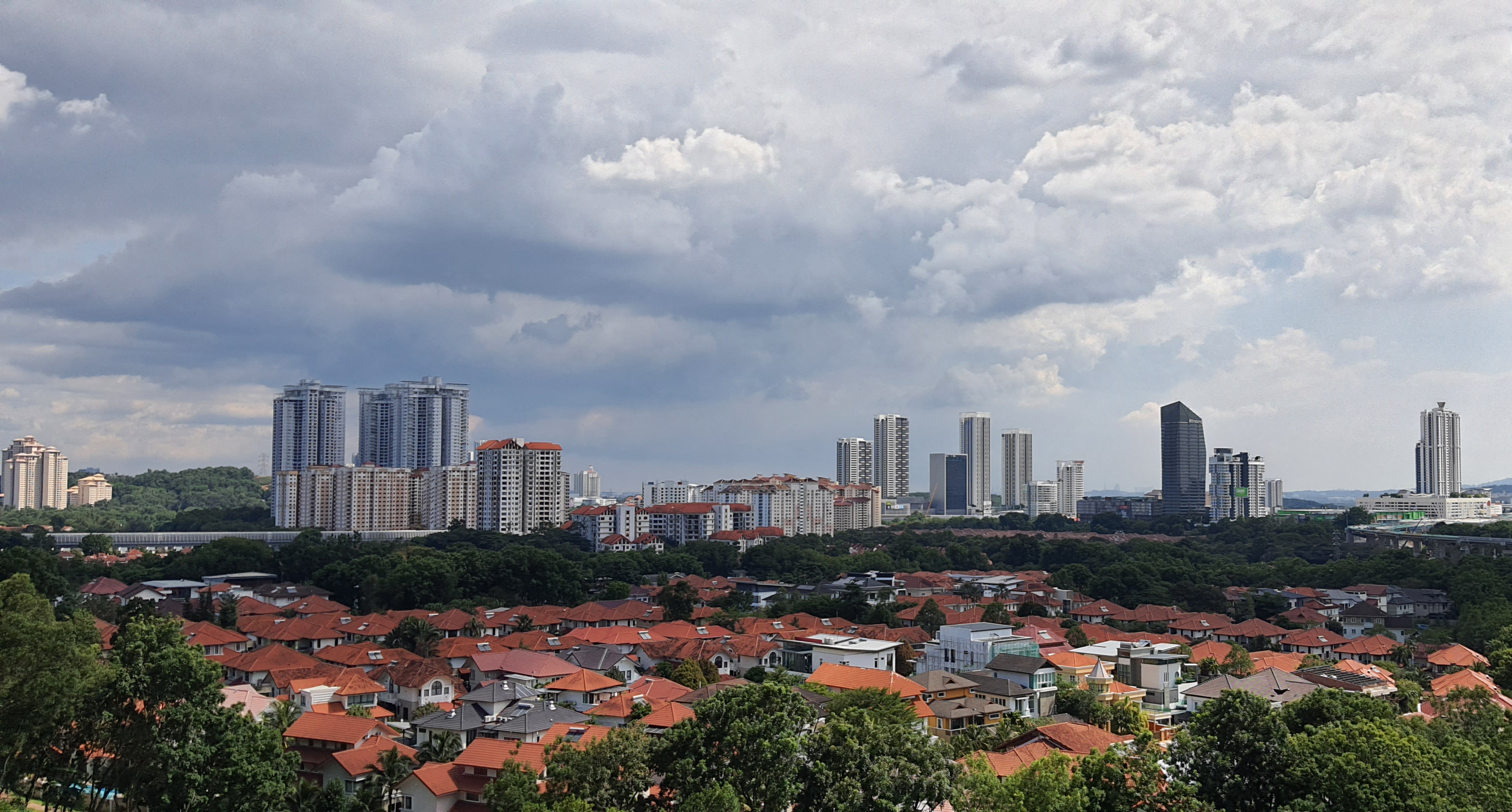
- Kota Damansara
  Kota Damansara, located within the Petaling district, was developed in the 1980s.
- Bandar Baru Bangi, situated 25 km from Kuala Lumpur City, was developed in 1974 and fully completed in 2007.
- Cyberjaya, located 30 km from Kuala Lumpur City, was developed in 1996 and is part of the Multimedia Super Corridor (MSC).

== Subsidiaries ==
No.	Subsidiary	CEO
1	Worldwide Holdings Berhad	Norazlina Zakaria
2	PECB Properties Berhad	Azhar bin Ahmad
3	Selaman Sdn. Bhd.	Kamarul Azian Hashim
4	PKNS Real Estate Sdn. Bhd. (PREC)	Fakru Radzi Ab. Ghani
5	Pi Brilliant Berhad	Mohd Zain bin Sarman
6	Selgate Corporation Sdn. Bhd.	Noor Hisham bin Mohd Ghouth
7	Datumcorp International Sdn. Bhd. (DCI)	Tengku Khairil Azwan bin Tengku Abdul Samad
8	SACC Convec Sdn. Bhd.	Nor Azlina binti Amran
9	Selangor Industrial Corporation Sdn. Bhd.	Saharom bin Mohni
10	Akademi PKNS Sdn. Bhd.	Mohd Raihan bin Tahir
11	De Palma Management Services Sdn. Bhd. (DPMS)	-
12	PKNS FM Integrated Sdn. Bhd.	Shamshul Bahari bin Ahmad
13	PKNS Golf Management Services Sdn. Bhd.	Zubir bin Idrus

== See also ==
- PKNS FC
- Smart Selangor Bus
