= Riaz Farcy =

Hong Kong cricketer

Personal information
- Full name: Mohamed Riaz Farcy
- Born: 15 January 1967 (age 59); Hong Kong
- Batting: Right-handed
- Bowling: Right-arm medium pace

Domestic team information
- Years: Team
- 1989: Sri Lanka Board XI
- 1989: Colts Cricket Club
- FC debut: 7 April 1989 Colts v Tamil Union Cricket and Athletic Club
- Last FC: 25 August 1989 Sri Lanka Board XI v Burgher Recreation Club

Career statistics
Competition	First-class	ICC Trophy
Matches	5	14
Runs scored	63	387
Batting average	12.60	27.64
100s/50s	0/0	1/1
Top score	24	102
Balls bowled	217	410
Wickets	3	12
Bowling average	31.66	20.41
5 wickets in innings	0	0
10 wickets in match	0	0
Best bowling	1/16	2/9
Catches/stumpings	5/–	0/–
- Source: CricketArchive, 5 January 2008

Mohamed Riaz Farcy is a former cricketer from Hong Kong. A right-handed batsman and right-arm medium pace bowler, He played for the Hong Kong cricket team between 1993 and 1998.

== Biography ==
Born in Hong Kong on 15 January 1967, Farcy played first-class cricket in Sri Lanka in 1989. He played three matches in the Lakspray Trophy for Colts Cricket Club and two for a Sri Lanka Board XI. He made his debut for Hong Kong in 1993, playing against Bangladesh. He then represented Hong Kong at the 1994 ICC Trophy in Nairobi.

== Career ==
In 1996, he played for Hong Kong at the first ACC Trophy tournament and in the Hong Kong Sixes. He also played in the Tuanku Ja'afar Cup that year, setting the record for the highest score in the tournament's history when he scored 178 against Thailand. He represented Hong Kong in the 1997 ICC Trophy in Kuala Lumpur, winning the man of the match award after scoring a century against Italy.

He played in the Hong Kong Sixes a second time in 1997, and his last known appearance for Hong Kong was in the 1998 ACC Trophy, his last match being the semi-final against Malaysia.
