= Michael Rea (cricketer) =

Irish cricketer

Personal information
- Full name: Michael Peter Rea
- Born: 19 February 1966 (age 60); Bangor, Northern Ireland
- Batting: Right-handed
- Role: Opening batsman

International information
- National side: Ireland (1985–1996)
- Source: ESPNCricinfo, 15 March 2016

Michael Peter Rea (born 19 February 1966) is a former Irish international cricketer who represented the Irish national side between 1985 and 1996. He played as a right-handed opening batsman.

Rea was born in Bangor, Northern Ireland. He made his debut for Ireland in June 1985, in a first-class fixture against Scotland. Overall, Rea appeared in eight first-class matches for Ireland between 1985 and 1994, all of which came against Scotland. He scored 500 runs at an average of 33.33, including a single century, 115 runs from 217 balls, made at the Woodvale Road ground in June 1993. Rea also made regular appearances for Ireland in the English limited-overs competitions (the NatWest Trophy and Benson & Hedges Cup). At the 1994 ICC Trophy in Kenya, he played in six of his team's seven matches, although he scored only 93 runs. His highest score was 36, made against the United Arab Emirates. Rea's final appearance for Ireland came in April 1996, in a Benson & Hedges Cup game against Hampshire.
