= Akhlaq Qureshi =

Pakistani-born Italian cricketer

Personal information
- Full name: Akhlaq Ahmed Qureshi
- Born: 7 February 1962 (age 64); Lahore, Punjab, Pakistan
- Batting: Right-handed
- Bowling: Right-arm medium

International information
- National side: Italy

Domestic team information
- Years: Team
- 1984/85: Lahore City Whites
- 1988/89: Lahore City

Career statistics
Competition	First-class	List A
Matches	1	3
Runs scored	50	16
Batting average	25.00	8.00
100s/50s	0/1	0/0
Top score	50	16
Balls bowled	100	126
Wickets	1	1
Bowling average	64.00	82.00
5 wickets in innings	0	0
10 wickets in match	0	0
Best bowling	1/25	1/20
Catches/stumpings	0/–	1/–
- Source: CricketArchive, 16 October 2011

Akhlaq Qureshi (born 7 February 1962) is a Pakistani-born former Italian international cricketer. He was a right-handed batsman and a right-arm medium-pace bowler who first played cricket back in the 1984/85 season. He made his cricketing debut for the Lahore City Whites in 1984, on the losing side of a Patron's Trophy match, where he scored 50 in the second innings. He later played 3 List A games in the 1998 Wills Cup.

His cricketing career found a new lease of life when he moved to Italy and decided to represent the new Italian team. He played in their first registered match, against Ireland in the 1996 European Championship, in the 1997 ICC Trophy and in the 1998, 2000 and 2002 European championships.

While playing in Pakistan, he was a lower-order batsman, however, by 1998, he had moved to the middle order for the Italians, also bowling economical medium-pace.
