= Jeff Richardson (cricketer) =

Bermudian cricketer

Personal information
- Full name: Jeff A. Richardson
- Born: Unknown
- Batting: Right-handed

International information
- National side: Bermuda

Domestic team information
- Years: Team
- 1996/97: Bermuda

Career statistics
Competition	List A
Matches	4
Runs scored	39
Batting average	13.00
100s/50s	–/–
Top score	29
Balls bowled	–
Wickets	–
Bowling average	–
5 wickets in innings	–
10 wickets in match	–
Best bowling	–
Catches/stumpings	1/–
- Source: Cricinfo, 19 March 2012

Jeff A. Richardson (date of birth unknown) is a former Bermudian cricketer. Richardson was a right-handed batsman.

Richardson made his debut for Bermuda in the 1994 ICC Trophy, making two appearances in the tournament against Hong Kong and Kenya. He later made his debut List A cricket for Bermuda against Barbados in the 1996/97 Shell/Sandals Trophy, with him making three further List A appearances in that tournament. He scored a total of 39 runs in his four List A matches, at an average of 13.00 and a high score of 29.
