= Johan Luther =

Danish cricket umpire

Johan Luther is a former Danish cricket umpire. Luther had previously played cricket for Denmark between 1969 and 1983, a period when Denmark had let to play List A cricket. He later stood as an umpire in a List A match between the Hampshire Cricket Board and Huntingdonshire in England's domestic one-day competition, the 2000 NatWest Trophy. He followed this up by standing in the match between the Essex Cricket Board and the Lancashire Cricket Board in the same competition, with him later standing in his third and final List A match between Bedfordshire and Cheshire in the 1st round of the 2004 Cheltenham & Gloucester Trophy, which was played in 2003.
