= Jonathan Orders =

Hong Kong cricketer (born 1957)

Personal information
- Full name: Jonathan Oliver Darcy Orders
- Born: 12 August 1957 (age 69); Beckenham, Kent, England
- Batting: Left-handed
- Bowling: Left-arm medium
- Role: Batsman

Domestic team information
- Years: Team
- 1978–1981: Oxford University
- 1978–1981: Combined Universities
- FC debut: 29 April 1978 Oxford University v Kent
- Last FC: 20 June 1981 Oxford University v Cambridge University
- LA debut: 20 May 1978 Combined Universities v Somerset
- Last LA: 11 May 1981 Combined Universities v Kent

Career statistics
Competition	FC	LA	ICC T
Matches	27	3	7
Runs scored	1,072	73	159
Batting average	23.30	24.33	31.80
100s/50s	0/6	0/1	0/2
Top score	79	63	63*
Balls bowled	1,213	33	0
Wickets	11	0	–
Bowling average	59.63	–	–
5 wickets in innings	0	–	–
10 wickets in match	0	–	–
Best bowling	2/16	–	–
Catches/stumpings	9/–	0/–	2/–
- Source: CricketArchive, 27 October 2007

Jonathan Oliver Darcy Orders (born 12 August 1957) is an English born former cricketer who has played for Hong Kong.

A left-handed batsman and left-arm medium pace bowler, he played 27 first-class matches, mostly for Oxford University, between 1978 and 1981 and three List A matches for a Combined Universities team in the Benson and Hedges Cup in the same period.

He also played for the Kent second XI twice in 1978, and represented Hong Kong at the 1994 ICC Trophy.
