= East and Central Africa Cricket Conference =

The East and Central Africa Cricket Conference was a regional body which organised cricket teams from Malawi, Tanzania, Uganda, and Zambia.

It ceased to exist in 1997 with the formation of the African Cricket Association, which now oversees all cricket administration across Africa.

Originally created as the East African Cricket Conference (EACC) from the Kenya, Tanganyika and Uganda Cricket Associations as the governing body of cricket in East Africa, the Conference was tasked primarily with controlling and regulating official and semi-official cricketing tours to and from East Africa.

The EACC was probably at its strongest in the 1970s when the EACC organised the East African Cricket Team with members from Kenya, Tanzania, and Uganda. The team was invited to, and participated in the 1975 Cricket World Cup. The team continued to be an associate member of the ICC until being replaced by the East and Central African cricket team in 1989.

The East and Central African cricket team continued to have ICC associate membership until 2003, when each of the member nations joined the ICC separately as independent members of the African Cricket Association.

== Members ==
- Kenya
- Malawi
- Tanzania
- Uganda
- Zambia
