= Leon Bouter =

Dutch cricketer

Personal information
- Born: 20 June 1964 (age 62); The Hague, Netherlands
- Batting: Right-handed
- Bowling: Left-arm orthodox

International information
- National side: Netherlands (1994–1998)
- Source: CricketArchive, 21 February 2016

Leon Bouter (born 20 June 1964) is a former Dutch international cricketer who represented the Dutch national side between 1994 and 1998. He played as a left-arm orthodox bowler, although he batted right-handed.

Bouter was born in The Hague, and played his club cricket for HCC and HBS. He made his senior debut for the Netherlands at the 1994 ICC Trophy, although he played in only two of his team's nine matches. He took 2/17 from 5.4 overs against Gibraltar, followed by 1/25 against Ireland. After the ICC Trophy, Bouter did not return to the national line-up until 1998, when he played a NatWest Trophy game against Somerset (a match which held List A status). Later in the year, he also made a single appearance in the European Championship, against Denmark, which was his final international game.
