= Graham Wilson (cricketer) =

English cricketer

Personal information
- Full name: Graham Bradley Wilson
- Born: 17 November 1970 (age 55); Scunthorpe, Lincolnshire, England
- Batting: Right-handed
- Role: Wicket-keeper

Domestic team information
- Years: Team
- 1994–1996: Lincolnshire

Career statistics
Competition	List A
Matches	1
Runs scored	1
Batting average	1.00
100s/50s	–/–
Top score	1
Balls bowled	–
Wickets	–
Bowling average	–
5 wickets in innings	–
10 wickets in match	–
Best bowling	–
Catches/stumpings	2/2
- Source: Cricinfo, 24 June 2011

Graham Bradley Wilson (born 17 November 1970) is a former English cricketer. Wilson was a right-handed batsman who fielded as a wicket-keeper. He was born in Scunthorpe, Lincolnshire.

Wilson made his debut for Lincolnshire in the 1994 Minor Counties Championship against Hertfordshire. Wilson played Minor counties cricket for Lincolnshire from 1994 to 1996, which included 15 Minor Counties Championship matches and 2 MCCA Knockout Trophy matches. He made his only List A appearance against Gloucestershire in the 1996 NatWest Trophy. In this match, he was dismissed for a single run by Mark Alleyne, while behind the stumps he took 2 catches and made 2 stumpings.
