= Joost Leemhuis =

Dutch cricketer

Personal information
- Born: 27 August 1969 (age 57); Surrey, England
- Batting: Right-handed
- Bowling: Left-arm medium

International information
- National side: Netherlands (1992–1999)
- Source: CricketArchive, 18 April 2016

Joost Leemhuis (born 27 August 1969) is a former Dutch international cricketer who represented the Dutch national side between 1992 and 1999. He played as a left-arm medium-pace bowler, although he batted right-handed.

Leemhuis began his club career for HCC (based in The Hague), but later switched to VRA Amsterdam. He made his senior debut for the Netherlands in August 1992, against Eastern Province (a touring South African provincial team). At the 1994 ICC Trophy in Kenya, Leemhuis played in four of his team's nine matches, taking five wickets. His best performance came against Ireland, where he finished with 3/34 from six overs, although he also took 2/19 against Gibraltar. At the 1998 European Championship, Leemhuis took ten wickets from five matches – the second-most for the Netherlands, behind Luuk van Troost. His best figures came against Ireland, where he finished with 3/27 from 10 overs. In May 1999, Leemhuis played in a NatWest Trophy match against the Lancashire Cricket Board, which held List A status. His final appearance for the national team came later in the year, against a Pakistan Emerging Players team.
