= Richard Pineo =

English cricketer

Personal information
- Full name: Richard William Pineo
- Born: 11 February 1975 (age 51); Ipswich, Suffolk, England
- Nickname: Pinners/MAD DOG
- Batting: Right-handed
- Bowling: Right-arm fast

Domestic team information
- Years: Team
- 2004–2005: Dorset
- 1999–2003: Suffolk

Career statistics
Competition	LA
Matches	6
Runs scored	18
Batting average	18.00
100s/50s	–/-
Top score	11
Balls bowled	264
Wickets	7
Bowling average	25.14
5 wickets in innings	–
10 wickets in match	–
Best bowling	3/38
Catches/stumpings	1/-
- Source: Cricinfo, 9 July 2010

Richard William Pineo (born 11 February 1975) is an English cricketer. Pineo was a right-handed batsman who bowled right-arm fast. He was born at Ipswich, Suffolk.

Richard made his debut for Suffolk in the 1996 Minor Counties Championship against Bedfordshire. From 1997 to 2003, he represented the county in 29 Minor Counties Championship matches and 9 MCCA Knockout Trophy matches.

He made his List-A debut for Suffolk against Lincolnshire in the 1st round of the 2001 Cheltenham & Gloucester Trophy. From 2001 to 2002, he represented the county in 6 List-A matches. His final List-A match for the county against Northamptonshire in the 3rd round of the 2002 Cheltenham & Gloucester Trophy. In his 6 career List-A matches, he scored 18 runs at a batting average of 18.00, with a high score of 11*. With the ball he took 7 wickets at a bowling average of 25.14, with best figures of 3/38.

In 2004, he joined Dorset, where he made his debut for the county in the 2004 Minor Counties Championship against Wales Minor Counties. From 2004 to 2005, he represented the county in seven Championship matches, the last of which came against Oxfordshire. He also represented Dorset in three MCCA Knockout Trophy matches, the last of which came against Cornwall. From 2005 to 2007, Pineo played for Havant Cricket Club in the Southern Premier Cricket League.
