= Triple Crown Tournament =

Cricket competition from 1993 to 2001

The Triple Crown Tournament was a cricket competition staged annually from 1993 to 2001 between the Home Nations; that is to say Ireland, Scotland, Wales and a team representing England. England were not represented by the professional English cricket team, but rather by an England Amateur XI in 1993 and 1994, by an England National Cricket Association XI in 1995 and 1996, and an England Cricket Board XI from 1997 onwards.

Matches were one-day affairs, and were 55 overs a side in the first three tournaments, but 50 overs thereafter. Although internationals, they are considered minor matches, that is, games without the List A status granted to more important one-day competitions. The venue for the tournament rotated around the four competing nations, with England hosting the first competition.

In the nine years of the competition, Scotland were by some way the most successful team, winning five titles compared with three for England, one for Ireland and none for Wales.

== List of tournaments ==
=== 1993 British Isles Championship ===
1993 British Isles Championship or 1993 Triple Crown Tournament
- Administrator: English Cricket Board
- Cricket format: Limited overs cricket
- Tournament format: Round-robin
- Host: England
- Champions: [NCA England] (1st title)
- Participants: 4
- Matches: 6
- Official website: Cricket Europe

The 1993 British Isles Championship is a cricket tournament that took place in 1993 in England. It was an initiative to help in the development of cricket in British Isles. The tournament was won by England NCA while Ireland came second. It was the first of 9 such tournaments held which was later replaced with European Cricket Championship

==== Teams ====
- England NCA (England Amateur XI)
- Ireland
- Scotland
- Wales

==== Group stage ====
| Team | P | W | L | T | NR | Points |
|---|---|---|---|---|---|---|
| England NCA | 3 | 2 | 1 | 0 | 0 | 4 |
| Ireland | 3 | 2 | 1 | 0 | 0 | 4 |
| Scotland | 3 | 1 | 2 | 0 | 0 | 2 |
| Wales | 3 | 1 | 2 | 0 | 0 | 2 |

==== Fixtures ====
- Ireland defeat Scotland by 5 wickets
- England NCA defeat Wales by 9 wickets
- Ireland defeat England NCA by 13 Runs
- Scotland defeat Wales by 6 Runs
- Wales defeat Ireland by 15 Runs
- England NCA defeat Scotland

==== Result ====
England National Cricket Academy won the tournament winning on Run Rate. Ireland came second in the tournament

=== 1994 British Isles Championship ===
1994 British Isles Championship or 1994 Triple Crown Tournament
- Administrator: English Cricket Board
- Cricket format: Limited overs cricket
- Tournament format: Round-robin
- Host: Scotland
- Champions: Scotland (1st title)
- Participants: 4
- Matches: 6
- Official website: Cricket Europe

The 1994 British Isles Championship is a cricket tournament that took place in 1994 in Scotland. It was an initiative to help in the development of cricket in British Isles. The tournament was won by Scotland while England NCA came second. It was the second of 9 such tournaments held which was later replaced with European Cricket Championship

==== Teams ====
- England NCA (England Amateur XI)
- Ireland
- Scotland
- Wales

==== Group stage ====
| Team | P | W | L | T | NR | Points |
|---|---|---|---|---|---|---|
| Scotland | 3 | 2 | 1 | 0 | 0 | 4 |
| England NCA | 3 | 2 | 1 | 0 | 0 | 4 |
| Ireland | 3 | 1 | 2 | 0 | 0 | 2 |
| Wales | 3 | 1 | 2 | 0 | 0 | 2 |

==== Fixtures ====
- England NCA defeat Ireland by 9 wickets
- Wales defeat Scotland
- Scotland defeat Ireland by 34 Runs
- England NCA defeat Wales
- Ireland defeat Wales by 15 Runs
- Scotland defeat England NCA by losing fewer wickets (scores level)

==== Result ====
Scotland won the tournament winning on Run Rate. England National Cricket Academy came second in the tournament

=== 1995 British Isles Championship ===
1995 British Isles Championship or 1995 Triple Crown Tournament
- Administrator: English Cricket Board
- Cricket format: Limited overs cricket
- Tournament format: Round-robin
- Host: Northern Ireland
- Champions: Scotland (2nd title)
- Participants: 4
- Matches: 6
- Official website: Cricket Europe

The 1995 British Isles Championship is a cricket tournament that took place in 1995 in Northern Ireland. It was a continuation of the initiative to help in the development of cricket in British Isles. The tournament was won by Scotland while England NCA came second. It was the third of 9 such tournaments held which was later replaced with European Cricket Championship and Scotland won the second successive title

==== Teams ====
- England NCA (England Amateur XI)
- Ireland
- Scotland
- Wales

==== Group stage ====
| Team | P | W | L | T | NR | Points |
|---|---|---|---|---|---|---|
| Scotland | 3 | 3 | 0 | 0 | 0 | 6 |
| England NCA | 3 | 2 | 1 | 0 | 0 | 4 |
| Ireland | 3 | 1 | 2 | 0 | 0 | 2 |
| Wales | 3 | 0 | 3 | 0 | 0 | 0 |

==== Fixtures ====
- Ireland defeat Wales by 6 wickets
- Scotland defeat England NCA by 6 wickets
- Scotland defeat Ireland in a Bowl-out
- England NCA defeat Wales in a Bowl-out
- England NCA defeat Ireland by 1 Run
- Scotland defeat Wales by 6 Wickets

==== Result ====
Scotland won the tournament for the second time. It was a first time a team won on points and not Run Rate. England National Cricket Academy came second in the tournament

=== 1996 British Isles Championship ===
1996 British Isles Championship or 1996 Triple Crown Tournament
- Administrator: English Cricket Board
- Cricket format: Limited overs cricket
- Tournament format: Round-robin
- Host: Wales
- Champions: Ireland (1st title)
- Participants: 4
- Matches: 6
- Official website: Cricket Europe

The 1996 British Isles Championship is a cricket tournament that took place in 1996 in Wales. It was a continuation of the initiative to help in the development of cricket in British Isles. The tournament was won by Ireland while England NCA came second. It was the fourth of 9 such tournaments held which was later replaced with European Cricket Championship. Ireland won the tournament for the first time and it was their first title in multi-nation cricket tournament.

==== Teams ====
- England NCA (England Amateur XI)
- Ireland
- Scotland
- Wales

==== Group stage ====
| Team | P | W | L | T | NR | Points |
|---|---|---|---|---|---|---|
| Ireland | 3 | 2 | 1 | 0 | 0 | 4 |
| England NCA | 3 | 2 | 1 | 0 | 0 | 4 |
| Scotland | 3 | 1 | 2 | 0 | 0 | 2 |
| Wales | 3 | 1 | 2 | 0 | 0 | 2 |

==== Fixtures ====
- Ireland defeat Wales by 5 wickets
- England NCA defeat Scotland by 9 wickets
- Scotland defeat Ireland by 7 wickets
- England NCA defeat Wales by 16 runs
- Ireland defeat England NCA by 7 wickets
- Wales defeat Scotland by 4 wickets

==== Result ====
Ireland won the tournament for the first time. They won on points and Net Run Rate. England National Cricket Academy came second in the tournament for a third time in a row

=== 1997 British Isles Championship ===
1997 British Isles Championship or 1997 Triple Crown Tournament
- Administrator: English Cricket Board
- Cricket format: Limited overs cricket
- Tournament format: Round-robin
- Host: England
- Champions: [Scotland] (3rd title)
- Participants: 4
- Matches: 6
- Official website: Cricket Europe

The 1997 British Isles Championship is a cricket tournament that took place in 1997 in England. This was the fifth tournament initiated to help in the development of cricket in British Isles. The tournament was won by Scotland while England Cricket Board XI came second. This tournament was later replaced with European Cricket Championship. This was the first appearance for England CB XI who replaced England NCA for future tournaments

==== Teams ====
- England Cricket Board XI
- Ireland
- Scotland
- Wales

==== Group stage ====
| Team | P | W | L | T | NR | Points |
|---|---|---|---|---|---|---|
| Scotland | 3 | 3 | 0 | 0 | 0 | 6 |
| England CB XI | 3 | 2 | 1 | 0 | 0 | 4 |
| Ireland | 3 | 1 | 2 | 0 | 0 | 2 |
| Wales | 3 | 0 | 3 | 0 | 0 | 0 |

==== Fixtures ====
- England CB XI 351-5 defeat Wales 130-10 by 221 Runs
- Scotland 218-6 defeat Ireland 199-10 by 19 Runs
- England CB XI 209-10 defeat Ireland 190-10 by 19 Runs
- Scotland 246-6 defeat Wales 245-5 by 1 Run
- Wales 186-9 lost to Ireland in a Bowl-Out 0-4
- Scotland defeat England CB XI in a Bowl-Out 3-2

==== Result ====
Scotland won the tournament winning for a record third time. England CB XI came second in the tournament.

=== 1998 British Isles Championship ===
1998 British Isles Championship or 1998 Triple Crown Tournament
- Administrator: English Cricket Board
- Cricket format: Limited overs cricket
- Tournament format: Round-robin
- Host: Scotland
- Champions: England CB XI (1st title)
- Participants: 4
- Matches: 6
- Official website: Cricket Europe

The 1998 British Isles Championship is a cricket tournament that took place in 1998 in Scotland. It was second time Scotland hosted this initiative to help in the development of cricket in British Isles. The tournament was won by England CB XI while Scotland came second. It was the first win for ECB XI who had replaced England NCA in the last tournament. This tournament was replaced after 2001 with the European Cricket Championship.

==== Teams ====
- England CB XI
- Ireland
- Scotland
- Wales

==== Group stage ====
| Team | P | W | L | T | NR | Points |
|---|---|---|---|---|---|---|
| England CB XI | 3 | 2 | 1 | 0 | 0 | 4 |
| Scotland | 3 | 2 | 1 | 0 | 0 | 4 |
| Ireland | 3 | 2 | 1 | 0 | 0 | 4 |
| Wales | 3 | 0 | 3 | 0 | 0 | 0 |

==== Fixtures ====
- Scotland 160-9 defeat Ireland 151-10 by 9 Runs
- England CB XI 271-5 defeat Wales 127-10 by 144 Runs
- Wales 164-9 lost to Scotland 167-7 by 3 Wickets
- Ireland 171-9 defeat England CB XI 167-9 by 4 Runs
- England CB XI 204-8 defeat Scotland 202-8 by 2 Runs
- Ireland 224-6 defeat Wales 207-10 by 17 Runs

==== Result ====
England CB XI won the tournament winning on Run Rate for the first time. Scotland came second in the tournament

=== 1999 British Isles Championship ===
1999 British Isles Championship or 1999 Triple Crown Tournament
- Administrator: English Cricket Board
- Cricket format: Limited overs cricket
- Tournament format: Round-robin
- Host: (Republic of Ireland) Ireland
- Champions: Scotland (4th title)
- Participants: 4
- Matches: 6
- Official website: Cricket Europe

The 1999 British Isles Championship is a cricket tournament that took place in 1999 in Ireland. It was a continuation of the initiative to help in the development of cricket in British Isles and first time hosted by Ireland. Ireland who have a combined team for North and South Ireland, last time hosted the tournament in Belfast, Northern Ireland. The tournament was won by Scotland while England CB XI came second. The tournaments which was later replaced with European Cricket Championship was won by Scotland for a record fourth time. It was the first time in this tournament that Wales did not finish at the bottom.

==== Teams ====
- England CB XI
- Ireland
- Scotland
- Wales

==== Group stage ====
| Team | P | W | L | T | NR | Points |
|---|---|---|---|---|---|---|
| Scotland | 3 | 3 | 0 | 0 | 0 | 12 |
| England CB XI | 3 | 2 | 1 | 0 | 0 | 8 |
| Wales | 3 | 1 | 2 | 0 | 0 | 4 |
| Ireland | 3 | 0 | 3 | 0 | 0 | 0 |

==== Fixtures ====
- Scotland 234-8 defeat Ireland 231-8 by 2 Wickets
- England CB XI 236-10 defeat Wales 142-10 by 94 Runs
- Scotland 179-9 defeat England CB XI 171-8 by 8 Runs
- Wales 154-2 defeat Ireland 153-10 by 8 wickets
- Scotland 151-4 defeat Wales 149-10 by 6 Wickets
- England CB XI 173-8 defeat Ireland 136 by 37 Runs

==== Result ====
Scotland won the tournament for a record fourth time. England CB XI came second in the tournament. It was a first time Wales did not finish last but came third.

=== 2000 British Isles Championship ===
2000 British Isles Championship or 2000 Triple Crown Tournament
- Administrator: English Cricket Board
- Cricket format: Limited overs cricket
- Tournament format: Round-robin
- Host: Wales
- Champions: Scotland (5th title)
- Participants: 4
- Matches: 6
- Official website: Cricket Europe

The 2000 British Isles Championship is a cricket tournament that took place in 2000 in Wales. It was second time hosted by Wales as a continuation of the initiative to help in the development of cricket in British Isles. The tournament was won by Scotland while Ireland came second. The tournament which was later replaced with European Cricket Championship was won by Scotland for a record fifth time. It was the worst performance for a team representing England who finished at the bottom without winning any matches. It was also the first time that tournament had 2 tied matches based on bowl-out. Also this tournament had just 1 complete match, 1 partial match and rest 4 were decided in a bowl-out. A bowl-out happened in case the match was washed out.

==== Teams ====
- England CB XI
- Ireland
- Scotland
- Wales

==== Group stage ====
| Team | P | W | L | T | NR | Points |
|---|---|---|---|---|---|---|
| Scotland | 3 | 3 | 0 | 0 | 0 | 6 |
| Ireland | 3 | 1 | 1 | 1 | 0 | 3 |
| Wales | 3 | 0 | 1 | 2 | 0 | 2 |
| England CB XI | 3 | 0 | 2 | 1 | 0 | 1 |

==== Fixtures ====
- Ireland tied with Wales in a bowl out
- Scotland defeat England CB XI on Run Rate
- England tied with Wales in a bowl out
- Scotland defeat Ireland in a bowl out
- Scotland defeat Wales by 157 Runs
- Ireland defeat England in a bowl out

==== Result ====
Scotland won the tournament for record fifth time. Ireland came second in the tournament. England CB XI produced the worst performance for a team representing England though their all 3 matches were rain affected.

=== 2001 British Isles Championship ===
2001 British Isles Championship or 2001 Triple Crown Tournament
- Administrator: English Cricket Board
- Cricket format: Limited overs cricket
- Tournament format: Round-robin
- Host: England
- Champions: [England] CB XI (2nd title)
- Participants: 4
- Matches: 6
- Official website: Cricket Europe

The 2001 British Isles Championship is a cricket tournament that took place in 2001 in England. This was the last of the nine tournaments initiated to help in the development of cricket in British Isles. This tournament was later replaced with European Cricket Championship. The tournament marked the comeback of England Cricket Board XI who won it after the previous tournament when they came last. Scotland came second. The busy schedule for Scotland and Ireland who now were ICC members meant that having future tournaments was not possible. ECB initiated the process where these teams could play in the county championship besides the ICC-Europe tournaments.

==== Teams ====
- England Cricket Board XI
- Ireland
- Scotland
- Wales

==== Group stage ====
| Team | P | W | L | T | NR | Points |
|---|---|---|---|---|---|---|
| England CB XI | 3 | 3 | 0 | 0 | 0 | 6 |
| Scotland | 3 | 2 | 1 | 0 | 0 | 4 |
| Wales | 3 | 1 | 2 | 0 | 0 | 2 |
| Ireland | 3 | 0 | 3 | 0 | 0 | 0 |

==== Fixtures ====
- England CB XI beat Scotland by 32 runs

14 August, Arundel Castle
ECB XI 214-10 (P Bryson 66, S Chapman 56, R Howitt 54, P Hoffmann 5-34)
Scotland 182-10 (C Smith 42, B Patterson 39, I Parkin 3-60)

- Wales beat Ireland by 2 wickets

14 August, Horsham
Ireland 149-10 (A Patterson 39, P Jenkins 3-24, K Bell 3-29)
Wales 150-8 (A Jones 45)

- Scotland beat Wales by 6 wickets

15 August
Wales 120-10 (S Morris 28, P Hoffmann 2-15, G Maiden 2-24, C Wright 2-26)
Scotland 121-4 (C Smith 35, C Wright 21*)

- England CB XI beat Ireland by 6 wickets

15 August, Stirlands
Ireland 109-10 (D Joyce 43, C Batt 3-14, M Sharp 3-15)
ECB XI 111-4

- Scotland beat Ireland by 3 wickets

16 August, East Grinstead
Ireland 211 (P Davy 53, A Patterson 36, C Wright 3-35)
Scotland 214-7 (G Maiden 79*, C Wright 45*, A McCoubrey 3-17, J McGonigle 3-22)

- England CB XI beat Wales by 102 runs

16 August, Brighton
ECB XI 213-6 (C Amos 65, P Bryson 50, S Foster 38)
Wales 111-10 (M Sharp 3-15, S Chapman 3-18, I Parkin 3-19)

==== Result ====
England CB XI won the tournament winning for second time making a comeback from the disastrous last tournament where they were win less. Scotland came second in the tournament.

== Winners ==
Triple Crown Tournaments
| Year | Venue | Winners |
|---|---|---|
| 1993 | England | England Amateur XI |
| 1994 | Scotland | Scotland |
| 1995 | Ireland | Scotland |
| 1996 | Wales | Ireland |
| 1997 | England | Scotland |
| 1998 | Scotland | England Cricket Board XI |
| 1999 | Ireland | Scotland |
| 2000 | Wales | Scotland |
| 2001 | England | England Cricket Board XI |
