= East and Central Africa cricket team =

East and Central Africa
- East and Central Africa cricket logo

International Cricket Council
- ICC status: Former member (1989 to 2003)
- ICC region: Africa

International cricket
- First international: 6 June 1990 v Denmark at Schiedam, Netherlands

One Day Internationals
- World Cup Qualifier appearances: 4 (first in 1990)
- Best result: Plate competition, 1990
- As of 1 August 2007

The East and Central Africa cricket team was a cricket team representing the countries of Malawi, Tanzania, Uganda and Zambia in international cricket. They were an associate member of the International Cricket Council (ICC) from 1989 until 2003.

== History ==
The team was a replacement for the East African team that was an associate member of the ICC until 1989. Uganda and Tanzania were joined by Malawi and Zambia, and the cricket team made its ICC Trophy debut in 1990. They played in the following three ICC Trophies, although for the 2001 tournament, they represented Malawi, Tanzania and Zambia only, Uganda having become an associate member of the ICC in their own right in 1998. Tanzania also became an associate member in their own right shortly after the 2001 ICC Trophy, and the team was finally dissolved in 2003, at which point Zambia became an associate member, and Malawi an affiliate member.

== Tournament history ==
=== ICC Trophy ===
- 1979 to 1986: See East African cricket team
- 1990: Plate competition
- 1994: 18th place
- 1997: 17th place
- 2001: First round

== Related teams ==
An East and Central Africa under-19 team contested two international tournaments, before the ECACC was broken up into its constituent teams. The first was the 1994 International Youth Cricket Tournament in Malaysia, which also featured Bangladesh, Denmark, Hong Kong, Malaysia, Papua New Guinea, and Sri Lanka. The second was the 2001 Africa Under-19 Championship in Uganda, which was the inaugural edition of the ICC Africa Under-19 Championships. In their first match of the tournament, against Uganda, the ECACC team won by four wickets. They went on to defeat Kenya by three wickets, lose to Namibia by five wickets, and finally defeat West Africa by five wickets, thus placing second overall behind Namibia.

== See also ==
- East and Central Africa Cricket Conference
- Malawi cricket team
- Tanzania cricket team
- Uganda cricket team
- Zambia cricket team
