= Wales national cricket team =

Representative cricket team for Wales

Wales

International Cricket Council
- ICC status: Part of the England and Wales Cricket Board

International cricket
- First international: 21 July 1923 v Scotland at Perth, Scotland

One Day Internationals
- World Cup Qualifier appearances: 1 (first in 1979)
- Best result: First round, 1979
- Official website: https://cricketwales.org.uk/
- As of 11 September 2006

The Wales men's cricket team is the Welsh team for cricket. Cricketers from Wales are currently represented by the England and Wales Cricket Board (ECB) and compete for the England cricket team. There have been some historical instances of a separate Welsh team in the 1920–30s, in the 1979 ICC Trophy, and in the British Isles Championship between 1993 and 2001, however Wales is not a separate member of the International Cricket Council (ICC).

Some politicians in Wales have argued for Wales to achieve separate ICC status from England and field a Wales cricket team, citing representation and opportunities as contributing factors, and following the establishment of a Scotland team from the England team in 1994. Cricket bodies in Wales, such as Cricket Wales and Glamorgan County Cricket Club oppose such proposals, citing finances and early difficulties. The ECB is neutral on the proposal, whereas the Welsh Government states it is for the cricket bodies to decide, but recognises the opportunity for Sophia Gardens in Cardiff to host England matches. Various cricketers have supported either side of the proposal.

== History ==
A Wales national team existed in the 1920s and 1930s playing against touring teams such as the West Indies, South Africa and New Zealand and secured a win against the West Indies in 1928. The team was assembled to play first-class matches, and was mainly supported by the Welsh Cricket Union and Gwilym Rowland, a Denbighshire-based businessman. There were plans for Home Internationals with Ireland and Scotland teams but plans for an annual series were not advanced. From 1923 to 1930 Wales played 16 first-class matches.

The Welsh Cricket Association was formed in 1969 and for the next three decades they played against ICC teams. Wales competed in the 1979 ICC Trophy as a non-ICC team, playing by invitation after the late withdrawal of Gibraltar. Wales won two of four matches, against the Netherlands and Israel and narrowly missing out on a place in the semi-finals to Sri Lanka. Among the Welsh wins was a match narrowly won against the Netherlands which was effected by rain. Welsh players that played in the tournament included William Douglas Slade. Between 1993 and 2001, a Welsh team played in the British Isles Championship, alongside Ireland, Scotland and an English XI team.

Between 2002 and 2004, a Wales cricket team was assembled by Glamorgan County Cricket Club, competing against England three times in One-Day Internationals in Cardiff, winning one of the matches.

Historically, the England team represented the British Isles, until Scotland became an independent ICC member in 1994. With former Welsh cricketer Robert Croft, previously representing Glamorgan and England, viewing the modern England team as comparable to the British & Irish Lions. Whereas Welsh Labour AM Mike Hedges stated that the Ireland and Scotland teams are actually "feeder teams" for the England team. However the use of the term "England", omitting Wales, has been criticised, and Scottish cricket executives are optimistic of their team's development.

=== Current status ===
The "Wales seniors friendly team" is the only senior men's Wales team listed by Cricket Wales. There are also Wales teams in ages up to U18.

The Wales National County Cricket Club competes in the National Counties of English and Welsh cricket competitions, representing all of Wales outside of Glamorgan, which is represented by Glamorgan County Cricket Club in first-class competitions.

The women's team played in the Women's European Cricket Championship in 2005, which Wales hosted, but have since adopted the same system as the men's team, with female players from Wales to represent the England women's cricket team.

Wales is currently represented by the England and Wales Cricket Board, internationally competing as the England cricket team. With Welsh players such as Simon Jones and Geraint Jones competing for the England team, such as during their 2005 Ashes series win.

== Proposals for standalone Wales team ==
Wales is currently represented by the England and Wales Cricket Board (ECB), however there have been some calls for Wales to have their own international cricket team like Scotland and Ireland, by various Welsh organisations, publications and public figures. Cricket Wales, the sport's governing body in Wales, and Glamorgan County Cricket Club, have expressed their opposition to any separate team, in particular over finances and potential exclusion from the County Championship, in which reductions in either would "have a significant negative impact [to the sport in Wales]". Cardiff Council and the Welsh Government view being part of the ECB as an opportunity to build-up Cardiff's reputation in cricket and as a sporting hub. The ECB is neutral on the proposal.

=== Support ===
Politicians across the political spectrum have stated their support for a standalone team such as Jonathan Edwards, Bethan Sayed, Adam Price and Mohammad Asghar, with Sayed stating in 2013 that "Wales is the second-oldest cricket playing country in the world, yet it is alone in the British Isles in not having its own national team", and Asghar stating in 2021 "if Afghanistan can play world cricket, then for God’s sake Wales should" and that playing on the international stage would "raise Wales' profile" and be economically beneficial while dismissing concerns from Glamorgan. Former Labour first minister, Carwyn Jones called in 2017 to reintroduce the Wales one-day team stating, "[It] is odd that we see Ireland and Scotland playing in international tournaments and not Wales", although if only Glamorgan's finances were not hit. Price stated in 2009, that "there are a great number of cricket teams in Wales [...] [but] no national side. In Carmarthenshire [...] [many] cricketers [...] could go on to represent Wales given the right opportunities". Price also added, "Many people argue that Wales is already represented in the England and Wales Cricket Board (the EWCB). But how often do you hear the second letter pronounced by the media or even game officials?", and that support for the team can be provided by the Welsh Government and ICC development funds for new nations.

In June 2010 a motion for establishing a "Welsh International 20-20 and one day cricket team" was tabled to the UK parliament. In October 2011, a petition was made to the Welsh Assembly for a Wales national cricket team. A 2013 Assembly debate was held on the topic with both Conservative and Labour members supporting the establishment of a Welsh team.

Bethan Sayed argued at a 2015 Assembly petition committee that Wales should have its own team, stating that Wales has more cricket players (7,500) than Ireland (6,000) which has its own team and twice the population, and that the idea is "an emotive subject". Calls were also made for a separate team following England's early departure from the 2015 Cricket World Cup in Australia.

Plaid Cymru included the proposal in its 2016 National Assembly for Wales election manifesto, although the issue was not part of negotiations with Welsh Labour.

There have been suggestions that the Hundred makes a Wales national cricket team more likely, as the ECB considers reducing County Championship matches putting Glamorgan at risk of not participating in high-level matches. Therefore, potentially causing a Welsh cricket team as a response.

Cricket Ireland and Cricket Scotland have overseen growth in the sport in their nations from a smaller base than Wales, and Cricket Scotland has expressed that developments in increased international fixtures with other teams from Ireland and the Netherlands can allow a Scottish team "to prosper".

Criticisms of the ECB have also been expressed as reasons for Wales to have its own team. With critics questioning the ECB team being portrayed as the England cricket team and using the English flag and symbol, as well as the attitude of the "English establishment", with critics stating that a "significant section of the Welsh population [...] totally reject the England Cricket team as representative of our country".

There are currently 22 first-class cricketers who would qualify to represent Wales, under current ICC eligibility rules.

=== Opposition ===
Cricket Wales and Glamorgan County Cricket Club oppose a standalone team separate from the ECB, with Glamorgan arguing for the financial benefits of the Welsh county within the English structure and that a separate team would make "no sense" and cause "serious financial repercussions for the club", with Cricket Wales stating they are "committed to continuing to play a major role within the ECB". Glamorgan, however, does hold two of the three votes in the management of Cricket Wales.

Alan Hamer, chief executive of Glamorgan County Cricket Club, stated they had informed the Welsh Government in 2011 of their opposition. Hamer stated such a move would end England internationals being played in Cardiff, such as the 2015 Ashes series, causing financial difficulties to the club, and that the current arrangement provided a "far higher" playing standard than those of tier two ICC nations. Succeeding chief executive Hugh Morris reiterated Glamorgan's opposition in 2018, stating he had seen no business plan, that it lacked any financial sense, and would cause the club to lose their stadium, players and make growing the game in Wales "more challenging" as the club was "very much wedded" to the ECB. Morris also stated a Glamorgan team and a Wales national team could not co-exist, with potential ICC Wales and Glamorgan matches clashing.

Mike Hedges, Labour AM, expressed his opposition to the idea in 2013, arguing that separation from the ECB would require Wales to "set up its own board under the ICC", causing Glamorgan to leave the County Championship, including any "shared-out revenue" with Sky, and the halting of test matches at the Swalec Stadium in Cardiff. Hedges also argued that the ECB has more money than the ICC can provide, that "Glamorgan is already effectively an all-Wales team", as it also plays in Abergavenny, Colwyn Bay and Llanelli (all not in Glamorgan county), and that the Ireland and Scotland teams are actually "feeder teams" for the England team. Eoin Morgan is given as an example of an Irishman playing for England.

Peter Black, Liberal Democrat AM, stated in 2013 that it would be "decades for Wales to be playing cricket with the top teams" and having Glamorgan in the County Championship delivered "great matches over the years". Black compared those supporting a separate Welsh cricket team to those aspiring for Welsh independence from the United Kingdom.

The Welsh Government and Cardiff Council have argued that participating in the ECB provides Cardiff, when it hosts England cricket matches, with an opportunity to build its reputation as a sporting hub.

=== Decision ===
The ECB expressed their openness to the issue. In the event of such a scenario, Wales would need to apply for associate membership of the ICC, separate from the ECB, and meet international standards for competitions and venues, but the ECB stated that there is little reason for Wales not to meet such criteria. The ECB stated that they support "the democratic decision and preferences expressed by cricketers in Wales". Sophia Gardens in Cardiff would have to forgo England's Test host status; however, between 2020 and 2024 Glamorgan were compensated £2.5 million from the ECB in return for not hosting any Test matches at the cricket ground between those years.

Assembly Members (now Members of the Senedd) unanimously agreed in 2013 that the decision of whether Wales should compete as a separate team to the England cricket team would be decided by the cricket sporting bodies themselves. The Welsh Minister for Culture and Sport, John Griffiths, stated in 2013 that whether there is a Welsh cricket team "is largely [a] matter for the relevant cricketing authority".

== Tournament history ==
Olympic Games record
Year	Round	Position	GP	W	L	T	NR	Win %
(Greece) 1896	No tournament							
(France) 1900	Champions	1/2	1	1	0	0	0	100.00
1904–2024	No tournament							
(United States) 2028	TBA							
(Australia) 2032	TBA							

== Notable Welsh cricketers ==
The following Welsh cricketers (except Wilf Wooller) have played Test cricket for England:

- Sydney Barnes – The legendary English fast-medium bowler, born in Staffordshire, made nine appearances for Wales from 1927 until 1930 (retiring at 57 years old). Barnes took 49 wickets for Wales in 1928, including seven for 51 and five for 67 in an eight wicket win over the touring West Indians.
- Johnnie Clay – Clay played one Test match for England in 1935.
- Robert Croft – Croft played international cricket for both England and Wales. He is the first Welsh cricketer to score 10,000 runs and take 1,000 wickets in first-class cricket.
- Joan Davis – She played in three Test matches for England in 1937.
- Carol Evans – She played in three Test matches for England in 1968 and 1969.
- Kay Green – She played in one Test match in 1954 and two ODIs in 1973 for England, becoming the oldest debutant in WODI history.
- Geraint Jones – Born in Papua New Guinea and brought up in Australia, Jones qualified to play for England through his Welsh parents. Jones was the England wicketkeeper between 2004 and 2006, most notably part of the team that regained the Ashes from Australia in 2005. He subsequently represented the Papua New Guinea cricket team.
- Jeff Jones – He took forty-four wickets in fifteen Tests for England from 1964 to 1968.
- Simon Jones – He became an integral member of England's triumphant Ashes-winning team in 2005. Jones's pace and mastery of reverse-swing carried him to 18 wickets at 21 in four Tests, before he was forced to sit out a nervy final match due to an ankle problem.
- Tony Lewis – 9 Tests. He is the only Glamorgan cricketer to captain England and lead a major tour abroad. He went on to become the face of BBC Television cricket coverage in the 1990s, and become president of the MCC.
- Austin Matthews – He played for Northamptonshire, Glamorgan and single Test for England.
- Matthew Maynard – He played four tests for England from 1988 to 1993 and 14 one day internationals. Captained Glamorgan CCC and part of the England backroom staff for their Ashes winning series in 2005.
- Hugh Morris – He played in three Tests for England in 1991.
- Gilbert Parkhouse – He played in seven Tests for England in 1950, 1950–51 and 1959.
- Pat Pocock – He played in twenty Tests and one ODI for England from 1968 to 1985.
- Greg Thomas – He played in five Tests and three ODIs for England between 1986 and 1987.
- Lynne Thomas – She played in 10 Tests and 12 ODIs for England between 1966 and 1979. In 1973, she became the first women to hit a century in a One Day International.
- Maurice Turnbull – He played in nine Tests for England from 1930 to 1936.
- Cyril Walters – He had most of his success after leaving Glamorgan, as captain-secretary of Worcestershire.
- Steve Watkin – He played three Test matches in 1991 and 1993, and four One Day Internationals in 1993 and 1994.
- Allan Watkins – He played for England in fifteen Tests from 1948 to 1952.
- Wilf Wooller – Cricketer, rugby union footballer, cricket administrator and journalist, Wooller captained Glamorgan CCC for 14 years, was Secretary for thirty and President for six.

Alan Jones played a match for England against Rest of the World in 1970 which was later stripped of Test status. He holds the record for most runs in first-class cricket without playing a Test match. In 2020, he was awarded an England Test cap.

In addition, Phil Salt has played ODI and T20I cricket for England, earning 50 caps across both formats, while never having played a Test match.

England is not the only country to have fielded Welsh cricketers: Imad Wasim, born in Swansea, earned 130 caps and took 117 wickets for Pakistan in ODIs and T20Is between 2015 and 2024.

== See also ==
- Sport in Wales
