= List of Malaysian List A cricketers =

This is a list of Malaysian List A cricketers. List A cricket matches are those between international teams or the highest standard of domestic teams in which teams have one innings each limited to a certain number of overs, usually between 40 and 50, though other over limits have been used. This list is not limited to those who have played List A cricket for Malaysia and may include Malaysian players who played their List A cricket elsewhere. The list is in alphabetical order.

Name	Career Span	Matches	Teams				
Chew Pok Cheong	1998	4	Malaysia				
Siswanto Haidi	1998	4	Malaysia				
Sarath Jayawardene	1993-2005	16	Antonians Sports Club, Panadura Sports Club				
Thusara Kodikara	1993-1998	5	Antonians Sports Club				
Rakesh Madhavan	1998	6	Malaysia				
Ramesh Menon	1998	7	Malaysia				
Marimuthu Muniandy	1998	5	Malaysia				
Jeevandran Nair	1998	5	Malaysia				
Suresh Navaratnam	1998	3	Malaysia				
John Prakash	1998	1	Malaysia				
Kunjiraman Ramadas	1998	7	Malaysia				
Shankar Retinam	1998	3	Malaysia				
Rohan Selvaratnam	1998	7	Malaysia				
Arul Suppiah	2002-2007	35	Devon, Somerset, Somerset Cricket Board				
Rohan Suppiah	1998	4	Malaysia				
Suresh Singh	1998	2	Malaysia				
David Thalalla	1998	7	Malaysia				
Santhara Vello	1998	5	Malaysia				
Matthew William	1998	7	Malaysia	Hammad ullah khan	2002	5	Malaysia

== See also ==
- Malaysia national cricket team
- List of Malaysian first-class cricketers
