= Zimbabwe at the 1998 Commonwealth Games =

- Flag of Zimbabwe
- CGF code: ZIM
- CGA: Zimbabwe Olympic Committee
- Website: teamzim.org

in Kuala Lumpur, Malaysia 11 September 1998 – 21 September 1998
- Medals Ranked 14th: Gold 2 Silver 0 Bronze 3 Total 5

Commonwealth Games appearances (overview)
- 1934; 1938; 1950; 1954; 1958; 1962–1978; 1982; 1986; 1990; 1994; 1998; 2002

Other related appearances
- Rhodesia and Nyasaland (1962)

Zimbabwe competed at the 1998 Commonwealth Games in Kuala Lumpur, Malaysia from 11 to 21 September 1998. It was Zimbabwe's 9th and penultimate appearance at the Commonwealth Games.

== Medalists ==
The following Zimbabwean competitors won medals at the games. In the discipline sections below, the medalists' names are bolded.

Medal	Name	Sport	Event
Gold	Evan Stewart	Diving	Men's 1 metre springboard
Gold	Roy Garden	Lawn bowls	Men's singles
Bronze	Ken Harnden	Athletics	Men's 400 metres hurdles
Bronze	Julia Sakara	Athletics	Women's 1500 metres
Bronze	Samukeliso Moyo	Athletics	Women's 5000 metres

== Cricket ==
Zimbabwe named the below squad for the tournament.

Roster

- Alistair Campbell (c)
- Eddo Brandes
- Gary Brent
- Craig Evans
- Andy Flower (wk)
- Grant Flower
- Murray Goodwin
- Adam Huckle
- Pommie Mbangwa
- Mluleki Nkala
- Paul Strang
- Heath Streak
- Andy Whittall
- Craig Wishart

Summary

Team	Event	Group stage				Semifinal	Final / BM	
Team	Event	Opposition Result	Opposition Result	Opposition Result	Rank	Opposition Result	Opposition Result	Rank
Zimbabwe men	Men's tournament	Jamaica; **W** by 6 wickets	Malaysia; **W** by 221 runs	Sri Lanka; **L** by 1 wicket	2	did not advance		5

Group stage

Group A
Pos	Team	Pld	W	L	T	NR	Pts	NRR
1	Sri Lanka	3	3	0	0	0	**6**	1.581
2	Zimbabwe	3	2	1	0	0	**4**	1.887
3	Jamaica	3	1	2	0	0	**2**	−0.122
4	Malaysia	3	0	3	0	0	**0**	−3.736

Source: ESPNcricinfo

9 September 1998
10:00
Scorecard

**Jamaica**; 142 (38.2 overs)	**v**	**Zimbabwe**; 144/4 (36.4 overs)
Tony Powell 41; Grant Flower 2/5 (4 overs)		Craig Evans 55* (43); Laurie Williams 2/42 (9.4 overs)

**Zimbabwe won by 6 wickets**
Royal Selangor Club, Kuala Lumpur
Umpires: Darrell Hair (Aus) and Rudi Koertzen (SA)

- Zimbabwe won the toss and elected to field.
- Andre Coley and O'Neil Richards (Jam) both made their List A debut.
- Points: Zimbabwe 2, Jamaica 0.

12 September 1998
10:00
Scorecard

**Zimbabwe**; 309/9 (50 overs)	**v**	**Malaysia**; 88 (35.5 overs)
Andy Flower 70; Jeevandran Nair 3/53 (10 overs)		David Thalalla 17*; Mluleki Nkala 3/6 (4 overs)

**Zimbabwe won by 221 runs**
Kelab Aman, Kuala Lumpur
Umpires: Javed Akhtar (Pak) and Syed Mahabubullah (Ban)

- Malaysia won the toss and elected to field.
- Andy Flower (Zim) scored his 4,000th List A run.
- Santhara Vello and Jeevandran Nair (Mas) both played their final List A match.
- Points: Zimbabwe 2, Malaysia 0.
- Malaysia were eliminated as a result of this match.

14 September 1998
10:00
Scorecard

**Zimbabwe**; 265/7 (50 overs)	**v**	**Sri Lanka**; 266/9 (47.2 overs)
Alistair Campbell 82; Chandika Hathurusingha 1/34 (10 overs)		Indika de Saram 75*; Pommie Mbangwa 3/49 (8.2 overs)

**Sri Lanka won by 1 wicket**
Tenaga National Sports Complex, Kuala Lumpur
Umpires: Rudi Koertzen (SA) and Steve Bucknor (WI)

- Sri Lanka won the toss and elected to field.
- Points: Sri Lanka 2, Zimbabwe 0.
- Sri Lanka qualified for the semi-finals and Zimbabwe were eliminated as a result of this match.
