= List of Malaysian first-class cricketers =

This is a list of Malaysian first-class cricketers. First-class cricket matches are those between international teams or the highest standard of domestic teams in which teams have two innings each. Generally, matches are eleven players a side but there have been exceptions. Today all matches must be scheduled to have at least three days' duration; historically, matches were played to a finish with no pre-defined timespan. This list is not limited to those who have played first-class cricket for Malaysia and may include Malaysian players who played their first-class cricket elsewhere. The list is in alphabetical order.

Name	Career Span	Matches	Teams
Ariffin Ramly	2004	1	Malaysia
Eszrafiq Azis	2004	1	Malaysia
Suriaprakash Ganesan	2004	1	Malaysia
Rattan Jaidka	1927	2	Gloucestershire
Sarath Jayawardene	1989–2007	107	Antonians Sports Club, Malaysia, Panadura Sports Club, Sri Lanka Board Under-23s XI, Western Province South, Western Province Suburbs
Thusara Kodikara	1991–1999	55	Antonians Sports Club, Central and North Western Combined XI, Central Province, Sri Lanka Board President's XI
Rakesh Madhavan	2004	2	Malaysia
Manrick Singh	2004	1	Malaysia
Mohammad Shukri	2004	2	Malaysia
Marimuthu Muniandy	2004	1	Malaysia
Krishnamurthi Muniandy	2004	2	Malaysia
Suresh Navaratnam	2004	2	Malaysia
Shankar Retinam	2004	1	Malaysia
Suresh Sakadivan	2004	1	Malaysia
Rohan Selvaratnam	2004	2	Malaysia
Arul Suppiah	2002–2013	100	Somerset
Rohan Suppiah	2004	2	Malaysia
Matthew William	2004	1	Malaysia
Priyankara Wickramasinghe	2008	4	Malaysia

== See also ==
- Malaysia national cricket team
- List of Malaysian List A cricketers
- For a list of first-class cricketers to have played for the Federated Malay States, see Federated Malay States cricket team
