= Cricket at the 1998 Commonwealth Games =

International cricket tournament

- Cricket pictogram
- Dates: 9 – 19 September 1998
- Administrator: Commonwealth Games Federation
- Cricket format: List A (50 overs-a-side)
- Tournament format(s): Round robin and knockout
- Host: Malaysia
- Champions: South Africa (1st title)
- Runners-up: Australia
- Third place: New Zealand
- Participants: 16
- Matches: 28
- Most runs: (Sri Lanka) Avishka Gunawardene (234)
- Most wickets: (Australia) Damien Fleming (14)

Cricket was included in the 1998 Commonwealth Games in Malaysia. This was the only time cricket was played at a Commonwealth Games until a women's tournament was included in the 2022 Commonwealth Games. Matches were played over 50 overs, and had List A status rather than full One Day Internationals. As is normal at the multisports events, the Caribbean islands that entered participated as separate nations, not as the combined West Indies team. Indeed, the Games were the first occasion on which an Antigua and Barbuda side competed at a senior level. Northern Ireland also entered, this occurrence being noteworthy because Irish cricket is usually represented by an all-island Irish cricket team.

Sixteen teams entered the competition, including seven of the nine then Test-playing nations: West Indies did not enter as mentioned above, while England declined to send a team at all, on the grounds that the September date chosen clashed with other fixtures such as the end of the County Championship.

The strength of the teams that were entered varied somewhat. Strong squads including seasoned Test and ODI players were fielded by the three nations that eventually won medals: Bronze medalists New Zealand with Stephen Fleming and Daniel Vettori, silver medalists Australia with Steve and Mark Waugh, Adam Gilchrist, Ricky Ponting, Damien Fleming and Darren Lehmann and gold medalists South Africa with Shaun Pollock, Jacques Kallis, Makhaya Ntini, Mark Boucher, and Herschelle Gibbs. India and Pakistan sent weakened teams as a result of a clash with the 1998 'Friendship' Cup, although India still named Sachin Tendulkar, Anil Kumble, Harbhajan Singh and VVS Laxman in its Commonwealth team while Pakistan included Shoaib Akhtar and Arshad Khan. Other notable cricketers who took part in the Commonwealth tournament included Sri Lanka's Mahela Jayawardene, Zimbabwe's Andy Flower and the West Indies' Curtly Ambrose and Richie Richardson, playing for their home country of Antigua and Barbuda under the Commonwealth format.

== Schedule ==
The competition schedule for the cricket tournament was as follows:

Legend
| G | Group stage | ½ | Semi-finals | B | Bronze medal match | F | Gold medal match |

Schedule
| Date Event | Wed 9 | Thu 10 | Fri 11 | Sat 12 | Sun 13 | Mon 14 | Tues 15 | Wed 16 | Thu 17 | Fri 18 | Sat 19 |
|---|---|---|---|---|---|---|---|---|---|---|---|
| Men | G | G | | G | G | G | G | 1/2 | 1/2 | B | F |

Two days of matches were played before the opening ceremony on Friday 11 September. All matches began at 10:00 am with the lunch interval scheduled between 1:30 and 2:15 pm and the afternoon session running until 5:45 pm, with the exception of the bronze medal match which began 30 minutes earlier. Sunday 20 September was designated as a reserve day.

== Qualification ==
The first slot of the 16 team tournament was made up the hosts Malaysia. The 9 full members of International Cricket Council at the time were invited to participate with all accepting save for England who declined due the Games clashing with the final two rounds of the 1998 County Championship. The West Indies were represented by the Antigua and Barbuda, Barbados and Jamaica. Trinidad and Tobago declined the invitation to participate, whilst Guyana, finalists at the 1997–98 Red Stripe Bowl, was a late withdrawal due to financial reasons.

The final five slots were determined by the final placings in the 1997 ICC Trophy also played in Malaysia 18 months prior. The first three teams were Bangladesh, who would go on to achieve ICC full member status in 2000, Kenya and Scotland. All three teams also achieved a berth in the 1999 Cricket World Cup. The Irish cricket team finish fourth, but with the team representing all of Ireland, Northern Ireland was given the slot. Denmark and the Netherlands, two non-Commonwealth nations finished fifth and sixth so the final place with was achieved by Canada who finished seventh.

Qualification
| Means of qualification | Date | Venue | Berths | Qualified |
|---|---|---|---|---|
| Host nation | —N/a | —N/a | 1 | Malaysia |
| Full members of International Cricket Council | 1998 | —N/a | 7 | Australia; South Africa; India; New Zealand; Pakistan; Sri Lanka; Zimbabwe |
| West Indies Region (Note: Since the West Indies qualified directly to the event due to being full member of the International Cricket Council, but being ineligible to participate as it constitutes a group of nations and territories that are represented separately in the Commonwealth Games, the West Indies Cricket Board selected Antigua and Barbuda, Barbados and Jamaica to participate in the tournament.) | —N/a | —N/a | 3 | Antigua and Barbuda; Barbados; Jamaica |
| 1997 ICC Trophy | 24 March – 13 April 1997 | Malaysia | 5 | Bangladesh Kenya; Scotland; Northern Ireland; Canada |
| Total | | | 16 | |

== Venues ==
A total of six venues were used for the tournament, with all matches being played on turf wickets. Only the 13 matches that were played the Perbadanan Kemajuan Negeri Selangor Sports Complex and Tenaga National Sports Complex were broadcast.

Venues
| PKNS Sports Complex | Rubber Research Institute Ground | Tenaga National Sports Complex |
|---|---|---|
| Petaling Jaya | Shah Alam | Kuala Lumpur |
| Capacity: 7,000 | Capacity: 6,000 | Capacity: 5,000 |
Cricket at the 1998 Commonwealth Games is located in Kuala Lumpur
| Kelab Aman | Victoria Institution | Royal Selangor Club |
| Kuala Lumpur | Kuala Lumpur | Kuala Lumpur |
| Capacity: 3,000 | Capacity: 1,000 | Capacity: 1,000 |

== Squads ==
The following squads were named ahead of the tournament:

Squads
| Antigua and Barbuda | Australia | Bangladesh | Barbados | Canada | India | Jamaica | Kenya |
|---|---|---|---|---|---|---|---|
| Dave Joseph (c); Curtly Ambrose; Hamish Anthony; Eldine Baptiste; Kenny Benjamin; Winston Benjamin; Wilden Cornwall; Ridley Jacobs (wk); Sylvester Joseph; Anthony Lake; Richie Richardson; Ian Tittle; Earl Waldron; Hayden Walsh | Steve Waugh (c); Mark Waugh (vc); Michael Bevan; Andy Bichel; Damien Fleming; Adam Gilchrist (wk); Brendon Julian; Michael Kasprowicz; Darren Lehmann; Damien Martyn; ~~Glenn McGrath~~; Tom Moody; Ricky Ponting; Gavin Robertson; Brad Young | Akram Khan (c); Faruque Ahmed; Hasibul Hossain; Shahriar Hossain; Aminul Islam; Azam Iqbal; Morshed Ali Khan; Khaled Mahmud; Khaled Mashud (wk); Mohammad Rafique; Mushfiqur Rahman; Naimur Rahman; Shafiuddin Ahmed | Philo Wallace (c); Henderson Bryan; Sherwin Campbell; Pedro Collins; Vasbert Drakes; Ottis Gibson; Adrian Griffith; Ryan Hinds; Roland Holder; Ricky Hoyte (wk); Mark Lavine; Winston Reid; Floyd Reifer; Horace Walrond | Ingleton Liburd (c); George Codrington; Muneeb Diwan; Derick Etwaroo; Joseph Harris; Nigel Isaacs; Davis Joseph; Paul Prashad; Brian Rajadurai; Danny Ramnarais (wk); Barry Seebaran; Sanjayan Thuraisingam; Anand Varadarajan | Ajay Jadeja (c); Anil Kumble (vc); Nikhil Chopra; Rohan Gavaskar; Harbhajan Singh; Gagan Khoda; Amay Khurasiya; VVS Laxman; Paras Mhambrey; Debashish Mohanty; M. S. K. Prasad (wk); Rahul Sanghvi; Robin Singh; Sachin Tendulkar | Jimmy Adams (c); Gareth Breese; Andre Coley (wk); Ryan Cunningham; Leon Garrick; Wavell Hinds; Nehemiah Perry; Kirk Powell; Tony Powell; O'Neil Richards; Robert Samuels; Audley Sanson; Laurie Williams; Carl Wright | Aasif Karim (c); Sandip Gupta; Edward Mboya; Hitesh Modi; Thomas Odoyo; Maurice Odumbe; Kennedy Otieno (wk); Ravindu Shah; Tony Suji; Martin Suji; Steve Tikolo; Alpesh Vadher |
| Malaysia | New Zealand | Northern Ireland | Pakistan | Scotland | South Africa | Sri Lanka | Zimbabwe |
| Ramesh Menon (c); Chew Pok Cheong; Siswanto Haidi; Rakesh Madhavan; Marimuthu Muniandy; Jeevandran Nair; Suresh Navaratnam; Venu Ramadass; Shankar Retinam (wk); Rohan Selvaratnam; Rohan Suppiah; David Thalalla; Santhara Vello; Matthew William | Stephen Fleming (c); Geoff Allott; Nathan Astle; Mark Bailey; Matthew Bell; Chris Drum; Chris Harris; Matt Horne; Craig McMillan; Dion Nash; Shayne O'Connor; Adam Parore (wk); Daniel Vettori; Paul Wiseman | Alan Rutherford (c & wk); Neil Anderson; Neil Carson; Gordon Cooke; Dekker Curry; Ryan Eagleson; Peter Gillespie; Derek Heasley; Kyle McCallan; Paul McCrum; Gary Neely; Andrew Patterson; Mark Patterson; Stephen Smyth | Arshad Khan (c); Kashif Ahmed; ~~Basit Ali~~; Asif Mahmood; Shoaib Akhtar; Saleem Elahi; Suleman Huda; Mohammad Hussain; Mohammad Javed; Taimur Khan; Shahid Nazir; Javed Qadeer (wk); Akhtar Sarfraz; Azhar Shafiq; Wajahatullah Wasti | George Salmond (c); Mike Allingham; John Blain; James Brinkley; Stephen Crawley; Alec Davies (wk); Nick Dyer; Douglas Lockhart; Drew Parsons; Bruce Patterson; Keith Sheridan; Ian Stanger; Greig Williamson; Craig Wright | Shaun Pollock (c); Paul Adams; ~~Adam Bacher~~; Dale Benkenstein; Nicky Boje; Mark Boucher (wk); Derek Crookes; Alan Dawson; Steve Elworthy; Herschelle Gibbs; Andrew Hudson; Jacques Kallis; ~~Lance Klusener~~; Makhaya Ntini; Michael Rindel; Henry Williams | Hashan Tillakaratne (c); Mahela Jayawardene (vc); Russel Arnold; Upul Chandana; Indika de Saram; Lanka de Silva (wk); Indika Gallage; Avishka Gunawardene; Chandika Hathurusingha; Pradeep Hewage; Suresh Perera; Thilan Samaraweera; Mario Villavarayan; Malinda Warnapura | Alistair Campbell (c); Eddo Brandes; Gary Brent; Craig Evans; Andy Flower (wk); Grant Flower; Murray Goodwin; Adam Huckle; Pommie Mbangwa; Mluleki Nkala; Paul Strang; Heath Streak; Andy Whittall; Craig Wishart |

Prior to the Games, Glenn McGrath was ruled out of Australia's squad due to injury with Andy Bichel named as his replacement. (Note: Glenn McGrath suffered a muscle strain in Australia's first warm-up against the Australian Cricket Academy on 4 September 1998 and subsequently withdrew from the squad. Andy Bichel was named as his replacement and played in the warm-up match against New South Wales the following day.) Basit Ali withdrew from the Pakistani squad after his brother suffered a heart attack. Wajahatullah Wasti was named as his replacement. Lance Klusener withdrew from the South African squad after sustaining an ankle injury during the third Test of South Africa's tour of England in July. Adam Bacher was also unavailable for the Games, suffering an injury to his shoulder. They were replaced by Alan Dawson and Andrew Hudson, respectively.

Players who were unavailable for selection include New Zealand paceman Simon Doull due to a groin strain, Australian leg spinner Shane Warne due to a shoulder injury and New Zealand all-rounder Chris Cairns due to knee surgery.

== Officials ==
A total of 16 umpires and 6 match referees were selected for the tournament.

Officials
| Umpires | | Match Referees |
|---|---|---|
| Javed Akhtar (Pakistan) | Rudi Koertzen (South Africa) | Ebrahim Braima Isaccs (South Africa) |
| Beattie Arlow (Ireland) | Syed Mahabubullah (Bangladesh) | John Reid (New Zealand) |
| Saleem Badar (Pakistan) | Subhash Modi (Kenya) | Hanumant Singh (India) |
| Nizam Baksh (Canada) | (Cricket West Indies) Eddie Nicholls (West Indies) | (Cricket West Indies) Cammie Smith (West Indies) |
| (Cricket West Indies) Steve Bucknor (West Indies) | Dave Orchard (South Africa) | Peter van der Merwe (South Africa) |
| K.T. Francis (Sri Lanka) | V. K. Ramaswamy (India) | Sidath Wettimuny (Sri Lanka) |
| Darrell Hair (Australia) | William Smith (Scotland) | |
| Ismail Khan (Malaysia) | Russell Tiffin (Zimbabwe) | |

== Draw ==
The 16 teams were divided into four groups of four on a seeded basis in May 1998. Initially, the draw was as follows:

Group A
Team
Sri Lanka
Barbados
Jamaica
Malaysia

Group B
Team
Australia
Guyana
India
Canada

Group C
Team
South Africa
Zimbabwe
Northern Ireland
Bangladesh

Group D
Team
New Zealand
Pakistan
Kenya
Scotland

The subsequent final draw saw Antigua and Barbuda replace Guyana in Group B and Barbados and Zimbabwe switching pools.

Group A
Team
Sri Lanka
Zimbabwe
Jamaica
Malaysia

Group B
Team
Australia
Antigua and Barbuda
India
Canada

Group C
Team
South Africa
Barbados
Northern Ireland
Bangladesh

Group D
Team
New Zealand
Pakistan
Kenya
Scotland

== Warm-up matches ==
Several warm-up matches were played prior to the tournament commencing. The Pakistan Cricket Board arranged for two matches to be played at Gaddafi Stadium in Lahore between the squad that was to compete at the Games against the squad that would contest the 1998 'Friendship' Cup with the both squads winning one match each. South Africa played the provincial team of KwaZulu-Natal at City Oval in Pietermaritzburg securing a narrow victory. New Zealand played four warm-up matches, three against New South Wales and one against Australia, losing all four. The matches were played at John Blanck Oval in Buderim, Queensland. Australia were defeated by an Australian Cricket Academy XI at the Allan Border Field in Brisbane before travelling up to Buderim where they also played New South Wales and the match against New Zealand, winning both. Finally, the only warm-up match that was played in Malaysia was contested between the hosts and Bangladesh where rain prevented a result from being achieved.

Warm-up matches

28 August 1998
Scorecard

| Pakistanis; 243/7 (50 overs) | v | Pakistan A 270/5 (49.2 overs) |
| Saleem Malik 62 (100); Azhar Shafiq 2/13 (5 overs) | | Akhtar Sarfraz 82 (81); Saleem Malik 4/19 (4.1 overs) |

Pakistanis won by 51 runs
Gaddafi Stadium, Lahore, Pakistan

- Pakistanis won the toss and elected to bat.

30 August 1998
9:00
Scorecard

| Pakistanis; 269/7 (50 overs) | v | Pakistan A 270/5 (49.2 overs) |
| Saleem Malik 89 (115) | | Saleem Elahi 129 (126); Aamer Sohail 2/41 |

Pakistan A won by 5 wickets
Gaddafi Stadium, Lahore, Pakistan

- Toss unknown

30 August 1998
Scorecard

| South Africans; 307/5 (50 overs) | v | KwaZulu-Natal; 267/5 (50 overs) |
| Jacques Kallis 106; Gary Gilder 3/41 (9 overs) | | Keith Forde 101; Paul Adams 2/43 (7 overs) |

South Africans won by 40 runs
City Oval, Pietermaritzburg, South Africa
Player of the match: Keith Forde (KwaZulu-Natal)

- Toss unknown

1 September 1998
Scorecard

| New South Wales; 6/214 (50 overs) | v | New Zealanders; 209 (49.1 overs) |
| Corey Richards 72; Shayne O'Connor 2/37 (8 overs) | | Chris Harris 48; Stuart Clark 3/28 (10 overs) |

New South Wales won by 5 runs
John Blanck Oval, Buderim, Australia
Umpires: W. Hoskins and L. Rose

- New South Wales won the toss and elected to bat.

2 September 1998
Scorecard

| New Zealanders; 125 (48.2 overs) | v | New South Wales; 3/126 (32.3 overs) |
| Adam Parore 30; Scott Thompson 2/10 (6 overs); Anthony Stuart 2/10 (6 overs) | | Matthew Phelps 43; Chris Harris 1/8 (8 overs) |

New South Wales won by 7 wickets
John Blanck Oval, Buderim, Australia
Umpires: Robert Dunbar (Aus) and W. Hoskins

- New Zealanders won the toss and elected to bat.

4 September 1998
Scorecard

| New Zealanders; 7/212 (50 overs) | v | New South Wales; 5/214 (49.2 overs) |
| Chris Harris 75; Scott Thompson 3/27 (5 overs) | | Shane Lee 73; Geoff Allott 3/37 (9 overs) |

New South Wales won by 5 wickets
John Blanck Oval, Buderim, Australia
Umpires: Robert Dunbar (Aus) and W. Hoskins

- New Zealanders won the toss and elected to bat.

4 September 1998
Scorecard

| Australian Cricket Academy; 198 (49.5 overs) | v | Australians; 168 (46 overs) |
| Nathan Adcock 58 (84); Michael Kasprowicz 3/32 (9.5 overs) | | Mark Waugh 58 (67); Scott Kremerskothen 2/11 (5 overs) |

Australian Cricket Academy won by 30 runs
Allan Border Field, Brisbane, Australia
Umpires: Jim Torpey (Aus) and Glen Zimmer (Aus)

- Australians won the toss and elected to field.

5 September 1998
Scorecard

| Australians; 211 (49.5 overs) | v | New South Wales; 81 (25 overs) |
| Brendon Julian 86 (74); Stuart Clark 4/24 (9 overs) | | Shane Lee 18 (19); Andy Bichel 3/25 (8 overs) |

Australians won by 130 runs
John Blanck Oval, Buderim, Australia
Umpires: Tony McQuillan (Aus) and Peter Parker (Aus)

- Australians won the toss and elected to bat.

5 September 1998
Scorecard

| Malaysians; 163/6 (44 overs) | v | Bangladeshis; 72/1 (19.2 overs) |
| Ramesh Menon 35; Mohammad Rafique 2/22 (9 overs) | | Azam Iqbal 35* |

Match abandoned
Rubber Research Institute Ground, Shah Alam, Malaysia

- Bangladeshis won the toss and elected to field.
- Rain prevented any play 19.2 overs into Bangladesh's innings.

6 September 1998
Scorecard

| New Zealanders; 151 (44 overs) | v | Australians; 1/156 (23.3 overs) |
| Matt Horne 59; Gavin Robertson 3/19 (10 overs) | | Mark Waugh 98*; Chris Drum 1/46 (6 overs) |

Australians won by 9 wickets
John Blanck Oval, Buderim, Australia
Umpires: Tony McQuillan (Aus) and Peter Parker (Aus)

- Australians won the toss and elected to field.

== Group stages ==
The competing teams were divided into four groups of four teams, denoted as groups A, B, C and D. Teams in each group played one another in a round-robin basis, with only the top team of each group advancing to the knock out semi finals and play-offs for the gold and bronze medals.

All times are local, MST (UTC+8).

=== Tiebreakers ===
The ranking of teams in the group stage was determined as follows:

1. Points obtained in all group matches (two points for a win, one for a no result, none for a defeat)
2. Net run rate.

=== Group A ===
Sri Lanka won all three of their games to qualify for the semi-finals. A straightforward seven-wicket victory over Malaysia (who collapsed from 87/3 to 109 all out; Sri Lanka reached 112/3) was followed by a 67-run win over Jamaica with Gunawardene hitting 107 (Sri Lanka 211/5; Jamaica 144/8), before a decider against Zimbabwe. The Africans reached 265/7 (Campbell 82, Goodwin 55); in reply, Sri Lanka stumbled to 110/5 before Hathurusingha (60) and de Saram (75*) brought them close to victory at 258/6. Streak then took three quick wickets, but the last pair survived to give Sri Lanka a one-wicket win.

In the other Group A games, Zimbabwe (144/4) beat Jamaica (142 all out) by six wickets, with an unbeaten 55 from Evans. Zimbabwe then scored 309/9 (Flower 70, Evans 59, Goodwin 53) as they crushed Malaysia (88 all out; Nkala 3–6) by 221 runs. The wooden spoon game saw Malaysia crumble to 83 all out thanks to 4–13 from Cunningham, losing by six wickets to Jamaica (87/4).

Group A
| Pos | Team | Pld | W | L | T | NR | Pts | NRR |
|---|---|---|---|---|---|---|---|---|
| 1 | Sri Lanka | 3 | 3 | 0 | 0 | 0 | 6 | 1.581 |
| 2 | Zimbabwe | 3 | 2 | 1 | 0 | 0 | 4 | 1.887 |
| 3 | Jamaica | 3 | 1 | 2 | 0 | 0 | 2 | −0.122 |
| 4 | Malaysia | 3 | 0 | 3 | 0 | 0 | 0 | −3.736 |

Source: ESPNcricinfo

Advanced to the semi-finals

9 September 1998
10:00
Scorecard

| Jamaica; 142 (38.2 overs) | v | Zimbabwe; 144/4 (36.4 overs) |
| Tony Powell 41; Grant Flower 2/5 (4 overs) | | Craig Evans 55* (43); Laurie Williams 2/42 (9.4 overs) |

Zimbabwe won by 6 wickets
Royal Selangor Club, Kuala Lumpur
Umpires: Darrell Hair (Aus) and Rudi Koertzen (SA)

- Zimbabwe won the toss and elected to field.
- Andre Coley and O'Neil Richards (Jam) both made their List A debut.
- Points: Zimbabwe 2, Jamaica 0.

9 September 1998
10:00
Scorecard

| Malaysia; 109 (47.4 overs) | v | Sri Lanka; 112/3 (19.4 overs) |
| Rakesh Madhavan 37; Thilan Samaraweera 3/17 (8.4 overs) | | Avishka Gunawardene 43; Ramesh Menon 2/30 (5.4 overs) |

Sri Lanka won by 7 wickets
Kelab Aman, Kuala Lumpur
Umpires: Beattie Arlow (NI) and V. K. Ramaswamy (Ind)

- Sri Lanka won the toss and elected to field.
- Suresh Navaratnam (Mas) made his List A debut.
- Marimuthu Muniandy (Mas) played his final List A match.
- Points: Sri Lanka 2, Malaysia 0.

12 September 1998
10:00
Scorecard

| Sri Lanka; 211/5 (50 overs) | v | Jamaica; 144/8 (50 overs) |
| Avishka Gunawardene 107; Kirk Powell 1/28 (8 overs) | | Jimmy Adams 34*; Russel Arnold 2/17 (10 overs) |

Sri Lanka won by 67 runs
Perbadanan Kemajuan Negeri Selangor Sports Complex, Petaling Jaya
Umpires: Dave Orchard (SA) and V. K. Ramaswamy (Ind)

- Jamaica won the toss and elected to field.
- Avishka Gunawardene (SL) scored his maiden List A century.
- Points: Sri Lanka 2, Jamaica 0.
- Jamaica were eliminated as a result of this match.

12 September 1998
10:00
Scorecard

| Zimbabwe; 309/9 (50 overs) | v | Malaysia; 88 (35.5 overs) |
| Andy Flower 70; Jeevandran Nair 3/53 (10 overs) | | David Thalalla 17*; Mluleki Nkala 3/6 (4 overs) |

Zimbabwe won by 221 runs
Kelab Aman, Kuala Lumpur
Umpires: Javed Akhtar (Pak) and Syed Mahabubullah (Ban)

- Malaysia won the toss and elected to field.
- Andy Flower (Zim) scored his 4,000th List A run.
- Santhara Vello and Jeevandran Nair (Mas) both played their final List A match.
- Points: Zimbabwe 2, Malaysia 0.
- Malaysia were eliminated as a result of this match.

14 September 1998
10:00
Scorecard

| Malaysia; 83 (48.3 overs) | v | Jamaica; 87/4 (21 overs) |
| Ramesh Menon 19; Ryan Cunningham 4/13 (10 overs) | | Tony Powell 20*; Suresh Navaratnam 2/23 (6 overs) |

Jamaica won by 6 wickets
Victoria Institution, Kuala Lumpur
Umpires: Ismail Khan (Mas) and Saleem Badar (Pak)

- Malaysia won the toss and elected to bat.
- Carl Wright and Ryan Cunningham (Jam) both made their List A debut.
- Audley Sanson (Jam) played his only List A match.
- Rakesh Madhavan, David Thalalla, Ramesh Menon, Suresh Navaratnam, Matthew William, Kunjiraman Ramadas, Rohan Selvaratnam, Siswanto Haidi, Shankar Retinam, Rohan Suppiah, Chew Pok Cheong (Mas) and O'Neil Richards (Jam) all played their final List A match.
- Points: Jamaica 2, Malaysia 0.

14 September 1998
10:00
Scorecard

| Zimbabwe; 265/7 (50 overs) | v | Sri Lanka; 266/9 (47.2 overs) |
| Alistair Campbell 82; Chandika Hathurusingha 1/34 (10 overs) | | Indika de Saram 75*; Pommie Mbangwa 3/49 (8.2 overs) |

Sri Lanka won by 1 wicket
Tenaga National Sports Complex, Kuala Lumpur
Umpires: Rudi Koertzen (SA) and Steve Bucknor (WI)

- Sri Lanka won the toss and elected to field.
- Points: Sri Lanka 2, Zimbabwe 0.
- Sri Lanka qualified for the semi-finals and Zimbabwe were eliminated as a result of this match.

=== Group B ===
Australia scored three wins out of three in this group. First came a nine wicket win over Canada who scored only 60 all out (Fleming 4–17); the Australians made 61/1 in 14 overs. In their second match, Antigua and Barbuda were dismissed for 99; Australia made 101/3 in reply. Finally, against India, Australia scored a total of 255/5, followed by India who stuttered to 109 all out.

Antigua and Barbuda scored 164/9 (a recovery from 77/7) in a 41-over match against India, but rain fell with India 30/2 in reply and the match was declared a no-result. India's Khurasiya scored 83 against Canada in a total of 157/9, with Kumble then claiming 4–11 as the Canadians were dismissed for 45. Antigua and Barbuda (256/7) beat Canada (135 all out), with Lake making 54 before retiring hurt and then taking 4–17; Walsh also made 51 for the Antiguans.

Group B
| Pos | Team | Pld | W | L | T | NR | Pts | NRR |
|---|---|---|---|---|---|---|---|---|
| 1 | Australia | 3 | 3 | 0 | 0 | 0 | 6 | 3.299 |
| 2 | Antigua and Barbuda | 3 | 1 | 1 | 0 | 1 | 3 | 0.079 |
| 3 | India | 3 | 1 | 1 | 0 | 1 | 3 | −0.340 |
| 4 | Canada | 3 | 0 | 3 | 0 | 0 | 0 | −2.558 |

Source: ESPNcricinfo

Advanced to the semi-finals

9 September 1998
10:00
Scorecard

| Antigua and Barbuda; 164/9 (41 overs) | v | India; 30/2 (9.4 overs) |
| Ridley Jacobs 43* (70); Anil Kumble 3/28 (8 overs) | | Sachin Tendulkar 15 (10); Eldine Baptiste 1/4 (1 over) |

No result
Tenaga National Sports Complex, Kuala Lumpur
Umpires: Javed Akhtar (Pak) and K. T. Francis (SL)

- Antigua and Barbuda won the toss and elected to bat.
- The match was reduced before play started to 41 overs per side due to overnight rain. Rain prevented any further play after 9.4 overs were bowled in the second innings.
- Wilden Cornwall and Ian Tittle (Ant) both made their List A debut.
- Robin Singh (Ind) took his 100th List A wicket.
- Points: Antigua and Barbuda 1, India 1.

9 September 1998
10:00
Scorecard

| Canada; 60 (20 overs) | v | Australia; 61/1 (14 overs) |
| Muneeb Diwan 14; Damien Fleming 4/21 (6 overs) | | Mark Waugh 24*; Sanjayan Thuraisingam 1/14 (5 overs) |

Australia won by 9 wickets
Perbadanan Kemajuan Negeri Selangor Sports Complex, Petaling Jaya
Umpires: Dave Orchard (SA) and William Smith (Sco)

- Australia won the toss and elected to field.
- Danny Ramnarais (Can) made his List A debut.
- Points: Australia 2, Canada 0.

12 September 1998
10:00
Scorecard

| Antigua and Barbuda; 99 (30.1 overs) | v | Australia; 101/3 (18 overs) |
| Eldine Baptiste 22; Damien Fleming 5/24 (9 overs) | | Adam Gilchrist 43*; Curtly Ambrose 2/29 (7 overs) |

Australia won by 7 wickets
Tenaga National Sports Complex, Kuala Lumpur
Umpires: Rudi Koertzen (SA) and Saleem Badar (Pak)

- Australia won the toss and elected to field.
- Damien Fleming (Aus) took his second and final List A five-wicket haul.
- Points: Australia 2, Antigua and Barbuda 0.
- Antigua and Barbuda were eliminated as a result of this match.

12 September 1998
10:00
Scorecard

| India; 157/9 (50 overs) | v | Canada; 45 (23.5 overs) |
| Amay Khurasiya 83 (136); Davis Joseph 2/18 (8 overs) | | Joseph Harris 13 (20); Anil Kumble 4/11 (6.5 overs) |

India won by 112 runs
Victoria Institution, Kuala Lumpur
Umpires: Ismail Khan (Mas) and Steve Bucknor (Jam)

- Canada won the toss and elected to field.
- Points: India 2, Canada 0.
- Canada were eliminated as a result of this match.

14 September 1998
10:00
Scorecard

| Antigua and Barbuda; 256/7 (50 overs) | v | Canada; 135 (31.3 overs) |
| Anthony Lake 54; Ingleton Liburd 1/41 (7 overs) | | Joseph Harris 48; Anthony Lake 4/17 (4.3 overs) |

Antigua and Barbuda won by 121 runs
Royal Selangor Club, Kuala Lumpur
Umpires: K. T. Francis (SL) and Syed Mahabubullah (Ban)

- Antigua and Barbuda won the toss and elected to bat.
- Anthony Lake (Ant) made his List A debut.
- Nigel Isaacs (Can) played his only List A match.
- Hayden Walsh Sr., Richie Richardson, Winston Benjamin (Ant) and Anand Varadarajan, Ingleton Liburd, Derick Etwaroo, Danny Ramnarais (Can) all played their final List A match.
- Kenny Benjamin (Ant) took his 100th List A wicket.
- Points: Antigua and Barbuda 2, Canada 0.

15 September 1998
10:00
Scorecard

| Australia; 255/5 (50 overs) | v | India; 109 (37.2 overs) |
| Steve Waugh 100* (102); Debashish Mohanty 3/50 (10 overs) | | Ajay Jadeja 27 (40); Brad Young 4/23 (8.2 overs) |

Australia won by 146 runs
Perbadanan Kemajuan Negeri Selangor Sports Complex, Petaling Jaya
Umpires: Javed Akhtar (Pak) and Russell Tiffin (Zim)

- India won the toss and elected to field.
- Amay Khurasiya was removed in stretcher after he collapsed due to dehydration while fielding. Rohan Gavaskar substituted for him. He couldn't bat during the Indian innings.
- Points: Australia 2, India 0.
- Australia qualified for the semi-finals and India were eliminated as a result of this match.

=== Group C ===
Honours in this group went to South Africa, who started off against Northern Ireland. The Northern Irish had reached 89/5 from 38.1 overs when it rained, and the Duckworth–Lewis method was used to calculate a target of 131 from 38 overs for the South Africans, who won by making 133/6. South Africa then bowled out Bangladesh for 79 and made 80/5 for a five-wicket victory. In South Africa's final match, Barbados set 254/6 (Wallace 74), but 71 from Kallis and 54 from Gibbs saw their opponents make 257/6 with ten balls remaining.

Barbados (160/6 in 41.3 overs) beat Bangladesh (144/7 in 47 overs, Shahriar Hossain 70*) under the Duckworth–Lewis method, and then beat Northern Ireland by 176 runs. Scores of 92 from Wallace, 66 from Griffith and 60 from Campbell contributed to a score of 296/5, which the Northern Irish never got anywhere near despite Smyth's 58, scoring just 120/7. However, Northern Ireland came back well to beat Bangladesh by 114 runs: the Northern Irish made 177 (McCallan 53) before Cooke took 5–35, as Bangladesh were dismissed for 63.

Group C
| Pos | Team | Pld | W | L | T | NR | Pts | NRR |
|---|---|---|---|---|---|---|---|---|
| 1 | South Africa | 3 | 3 | 0 | 0 | 0 | 6 | 1.143 |
| 2 | Barbados | 3 | 2 | 1 | 0 | 0 | 4 | 1.330 |
| 3 | Northern Ireland | 3 | 1 | 2 | 0 | 0 | 2 | −0.643 |
| 4 | Bangladesh | 3 | 0 | 3 | 0 | 0 | 0 | −1.547 |

Source: ESPNcricinfo

Advanced to the semi-finals

10 September 1998
10:00
Scorecard

| Bangladesh; 144/7 (47 overs) | v | Barbados; 160/6 (41.3 overs) |
| Shahriar Hossain 70* (123); Henderson Bryan 3/32 (10 overs) | | Adrian Griffith 31; Naimur Rahman 2/30 (9 overs) |

Barbados won by 4 wickets (D/L method)
Royal Selangor Club, Kuala Lumpur
Umpires: Russell Tiffin (Zim) and Saleem Badar (Pak)

- Barbados won the toss and elected to field.
- The match was reduced to 47 overs per side due to rain, Barbados target was 160 runs.
- Points: Barbados 2, Bangladesh 0.

10 September 1998
10:00
Scorecard

| Northern Ireland; 89/5 (38.1 overs) | v | South Africa; 133/6 (31.4 overs) |
| Neil Carson 22* (54); Jacques Kallis 1/3 (4 overs) | | Dale Benkenstein 44* (64); Ryan Eagleson 3/28 (7.4 overs) |

South Africa won by 4 wickets (D/L method)
Kelab Aman, Kuala Lumpur
Umpires: Eddie Nicholls (Guy) and Subhash Modi (Ken)

- South Africa won the toss and elected to field.
- Rain halted play after 38.1 overs in the Northern Ireland innings. South Africa's target was 131 runs from 38 overs.
- Neil Carson (NI) made his List A debut.
- Paul McCrum (NI) played his final List A match.
- Points: South Africa 2, Northern Ireland 0.

13 September 1998
10:00
Scorecard

| Bangladesh; 79 (38.4 overs) | v | South Africa; 80/5 (24.3 overs) |
| Faruque Ahmed 20 (48); Jacques Kallis 3/13 (7 overs) | | Herschelle Gibbs 26* (51); Mohammad Rafique 2/16 (7.3 overs) |

South Africa won by 5 wickets
Perbadanan Kemajuan Negeri Selangor Sports Complex, Petaling Jaya
Umpires: Eddie Nicholls (Guy) and Subhash Modi (Ken)

- South Africa won the toss and elected to field.
- Points: South Africa 2, Bangladesh 0.
- Bangladesh were eliminated as a result of this match.

13 September 1998
10:00
Scorecard

| Barbados; 296/5 (50 overs) | v | Northern Ireland; 120/7 (50 overs) |
| Philo Wallace 92; Dekker Curry 2/42 (10 overs) | | Stephen Smyth 58; Ottis Gibson 2/18 (7 overs) |

Barbados won by 176 runs
Rubber Research Institute Ground, Shah Alam
Umpires: Javed Akhtar (Pak) and William Smith (Sco)

- Northern Ireland won the toss and elected to field.
- Ryan Hinds (Bar) made his List A debut.
- Points: Barbados 2, Northern Ireland 0.
- Northern Ireland were eliminated as a result of this match.

15 September 1998
10:00
Scorecard

| Northern Ireland; 177 (49.5 overs) | v | Bangladesh; 63 (21 overs) |
| Kyle McCallan 53*; Morshed Ali Khan 2/19 (7 overs) | | Khaled Mahmud 27; Gordon Cooke 5/35 (10 overs) |

Northern Ireland won by 114 runs
Royal Selangor Club, Kuala Lumpur
Umpires: Nizam Baksh (Can) and Saleem Badar (Pak)

- Bangladesh won the toss and elected to field.
- Neil Anderson (NI) played his only List A match.
- Dekker Curry (NI) played his final List A match.
- Gordon Cooke (NI) took his only List A five-wicket haul.
- Points: Northern Ireland 2, Bangladesh 0.

15 September 1998
10:00
Scorecard

| Barbados; 254/6 (50 overs) | v | South Africa; 257/6 (48.2 overs) |
| Philo Wallace 74 (73); Alan Dawson 2/47 (8 overs) | | Jacques Kallis 71 (96); Ottis Gibson 3/38 (9 overs) |

South Africa won by 4 wickets
Kelab Aman, Kuala Lumpur
Umpires: K. T. Francis (SL) and V. K. Ramaswamy (Ind)

- Barbados won the toss and elected to bat.
- Points: South Africa 2, Barbados 0.
- South Africa qualified for the semi-finals and Barbados were eliminated as a result of this match.

=== Group D ===
One-day specialists New Zealand won all their matches in Group D, beginning with a comfortable five-wicket win over Kenya (Kenya 144/8; New Zealand 145/5) before an even more straightforward success against Scotland. The New Zealanders amassed 278/6 (Fleming 102, Parore 87), then Harris took 4–25 as Scotland could manage only 101 all out. Finally the Kiwis won the crunch match against Pakistan by 81 runs: New Zealand's 215/8 was boosted by 66 from Fleming despite Shoaib Akhtar's 4–47, but only three Pakistanis (and extras) reached double figures as they lost their last six wickets for 21 runs, being bowled out for 134 to slide to an 81-run defeat.

Pakistan had earlier been frustrated by rain against Scotland; they had scored 201/5 from their 50 overs (Akhtar Sarfraz 66*) and had reduced the Scots to 31/3 when the weather intervened. The Pakistanis did beat Kenya, however: Odoyo's 4–39 had restricted them to 189/8, but Arshad Khan's 4–14 and Javed Qadeer's five catches behind the stumps helped Pakistan to a 129-run win as they dismissed the Africans for only 60. Odumbe took 5–38 as Kenya kept Scotland down to 156/8; they then made 157/5 to win with 12.3 overs in hand.

Group D
| Pos | Team | Pld | W | L | T | NR | Pts | NRR |
|---|---|---|---|---|---|---|---|---|
| 1 | New Zealand | 3 | 3 | 0 | 0 | 0 | 6 | 1.799 |
| 2 | Pakistan | 3 | 1 | 1 | 0 | 1 | 3 | 0.480 |
| 3 | Kenya | 3 | 1 | 2 | 0 | 0 | 2 | −0.697 |
| 4 | Scotland | 3 | 0 | 2 | 0 | 1 | 1 | −2.401 |

Source: ESPNcricinfo

Advanced to the semi-finals

9 September 1998
10:00
Scorecard

| Pakistan; 201/5 (50 overs) | v | Scotland; 31/3 (17.2 overs) |
| Akhtar Sarfraz 66 (61); Mike Allingham 2/46 (10 overs) | | Stephen Crawley 12 (52); Shoaib Akhtar 2/7 (5 overs) |

No result
Victoria Institution, Kuala Lumpur
Umpires: Nizam Baksh (Can) and Russell Tiffin (Zim)

- Scotland won the toss and elected to field.
- No further play was possible due to rain after 17.2 overs into Scotland's innings.
- Points: Pakistan 1, Scotland 1.

10 September 1998
10:00
Scorecard

| Kenya; 144/8 (50 overs) | v | New Zealand; 145/5 (47.3 overs) |
| Steve Tikolo 35 (64); Chris Harris 3/7 (10 overs) | | Matt Horne 39 (76); Maurice Odumbe 1/17 (10 overs) |

New Zealand won by 5 wickets
Perbadanan Kemajuan Negeri Selangor Sports Complex, Petaling Jaya
Umpires: Darrell Hair (Aus) and Steve Bucknor (Jam)

- New Zealand won the toss and elected to field.
- Craig McMillan (NZ) scored his 2,000th List A run.
- Points: New Zealand 2, Kenya 0.

12 September 1998
10:00
Scorecard

| Pakistan; 189/8 (50 overs) | v | Kenya; 60 (25.3 overs) |
| Wajahatullah Wasti 32; Thomas Odoyo 4/39 (10 overs) | | Hitesh Modi 18; Arshad Khan 4/14 (8 overs) |

Pakistan won by 129 runs
Rubber Research Institute Ground, Shah Alam
Umpires: K. T. Francis (SL) and Nizam Baksh (Can)

- Kenya won the toss and elected to field.
- Edward Mboya (Ken) made his List A debut.
- Points: Pakistan 2, Kenya 0.
- Kenya were eliminated as a result of this match.

13 September 1998
10:00
Scorecard

| New Zealand; 278/6 (50 overs) | v | Scotland; 101 (42.4 overs) |
| Stephen Fleming 102 (135); James Brinkley 3/55 (10 overs) | | George Salmond 31 (73); Chris Harris 4/25 (10 overs) |

New Zealand won by 177 runs
Kelab Aman, Kuala Lumpur
Umpires: Beattie Arlow (NI) and Darrell Hair (Aus)

- Scotland won the toss and elected to field.
- Points: New Zealand 2, Scotland 0.
- Scotland were eliminated as a result of this match.

15 September 1998
10:00
Scorecard

| Scotland; 156/8 (50 overs) | v | Kenya; 157/5 (37.3 overs) |
| Bruce Patterson 31 (82); Maurice Odumbe 5/38 (10 overs) | | Ravindu Shah 48 (63); Keith Sheridan 2/24 (10 overs) |

Kenya won by 5 wickets
Rubber Research Institute Ground, Shah Alam
Umpires: Beattie Arlow (NI) and Steve Bucknor (Jam)

- Scotland won the toss and elected to bat.
- Edward Mboya (Ken) played his final List A match.
- Maurice Odumbe (Ken) took his only List A five-wicket haul.
- Points: Kenya 2, Scotland 0.

15 September 1998
10:00
Scorecard

| New Zealand; 215/8 (50 overs) | v | Pakistan; 134 (42.5 overs) |
| Stephen Fleming 66 (99); Shoaib Akhtar 4/47 (10 overs) | | Akhtar Sarfraz 34 (84); Daniel Vettori 3/33 (10 overs) |

New Zealand won by 81 runs
Tenaga National Sports Complex, Kuala Lumpur
Umpires: Dave Orchard (SA) and Eddie Nicholls (Guy)

- Pakistan won the toss and elected to field.
- Points: New Zealand 2, Pakistan 0.
- New Zealand qualified for the semi-finals and Pakistan were eliminated as a result of this match.

== Medal round ==
Semi-finals
A1 | Sri Lanka | 130 (44 overs)
C1 | South Africa | 131/9 (47 overs)
D1 | New Zealand | 58 (26.4 overs)
B1 | Australia | 62/1 (10.5 overs)

Gold medal match
B1 | Australia | 183 (49.3 overs)
C1 | South Africa | 184/6 (46 overs)
Bronze medal match
D1 | New Zealand | 212/7 (50 overs)
A1 | Sri Lanka | 161 (44.4 overs)

=== Semi-finals ===
==== South Africa v Sri Lanka ====
16 September 1998
10:00
Scorecard

| Sri Lanka; 130 (44 overs) | v | South Africa; 131/9 (47 overs) |
| Avishka Gunawardene 53 (87); Nicky Boje 4/16 (9 overs) | | Michael Rindel 25 (28); Thilan Samaraweera 2/13 (10 overs) |

South Africa won by 1 wicket
Perbadanan Kemajuan Negeri Selangor Sports Complex, Petaling Jaya
Umpires: Darrell Hair (Aus) and Russell Tiffin (Zim)

- South Africa won the toss and elected to field.

A low-scoring game produced a thrilling climax. Gunawardene's 53 held the Sri Lankan innings together after they had been put in to bat by the South Africans, but Boje's List A career best 4/16 kept the Sri Lankans' score down to a distinctly unimpressive 130 as they were bowled out in 44 overs. In reply, South Africa lost wickets at regular intervals, with the highest score being opener Rindel's 25. At 96/9 all looked lost, but then Boje (20*) and Dawson (15*) compiled an unbroken stand of 35 for the last wicket to lead their team to 131/9 and a one-wicket victory.

==== Australia v New Zealand ====
17 September 1998
10:00
Scorecard

| New Zealand; 58 (26.4 overs) | v | Australia; 62/1 (10.5 overs) |
| Stephen Fleming 20 (41); Brad Young 4/4 (4 overs) | | Adam Gilchrist 42* (36); Alex Tait 1/17 (5 overs) |

Australia won by 9 wickets
Tenaga National Sports Complex, Kuala Lumpur
Umpires: Dave Orchard (SA) and V. K. Ramaswamy (Ind)

- Australia won the toss and elected to field.

A totally one-sided trans-Tasman clash saw New Zealand collapse to a feeble 58 all out after being sent in, with only captain Fleming reaching 20. Australian slow left-armer Brad Young took a hat-trick to finish with an exceptional bowling analysis of 4/4 from his 4 overs. In reply, the Australians scored just under six runs an over, losing only Mark Waugh as they raced to 62/1 in 10.5 overs and won easily.

=== Bronze medal match ===
18 September 1998
10:00
Scorecard

| New Zealand; 212/7 (50 overs) | v | Sri Lanka; 161 (44.4 overs) |
| Chris Harris 56* (71); Russel Arnold 1/27 (10 overs) | | Suresh Perera 45 (55); Daniel Vettori 3/33 (10 overs) |

New Zealand won by 51 runs
Tenaga National Sports Complex, Kuala Lumpur
Umpires: Rudi Koertzen (SA) and Saleem Badar (Pak)

- Sri Lanka won the toss and elected to field.

New Zealand recovered from the trauma of their semi-final thrashing to beat Sri Lanka by 51 runs. 56 not out from Harris and 56 from Astle were the main elements of a final total of 212/7 that included three run-outs. The Sri Lankans struggled to 77/7 in their innings, and though they added 53 for the eighth wicket thanks to Perera's 45, it was never likely to be enough and they were bowled out for 161.

=== Gold medal match ===
19 September 1998
10:00
Scorecard

| Australia; 183 (49.3 overs) | v | South Africa; 184/6 (46 overs) |
| Steve Waugh 90* (109); Shaun Pollock 4/19 (9 overs) | | Michael Rindel 67 (106); Darren Lehmann 3/14 (4 overs) |

South Africa won by 4 wickets
Perbadanan Kemajuan Negeri Selangor Sports Complex, Petaling Jaya
Umpires: K. T. Francis (SL) and Steve Bucknor (Jam)

- South Africa won the toss and elected to field.
- The crowd of 7,532 was the largest recorded crowd for a cricket match in Malaysia.
- This marked the first championship for South Africa at an ICC global event or a global multi-sport event. However, the matches did not have ODI status.

Put in by South Africa after losing the toss, the Australians were indebted to captain Steve Waugh's unbeaten 90 as they recovered from 58/4 to post a still below-par 183 all out. Opposing captain Pollock was the chief destroyer for South Africa, with 4–19 from nine tight overs to remove Mark Waugh, Ponting, Gilchrist and Lehmann. South Africa got off to a good start in their reply with an opening partnership of 73 between Rindel (67) and Hudson (36). A burst of wickets from Lehmann (3–14) saw the South Africans wobble as they fell from 158/2 to 183/6, but the Proteas did not lose another wicket and Kallis' watchful 44 from 96 balls saw South Africa through to 184/6 and the gold medal with four overs to spare.

== Final standings ==
The final standings were as follows:

Final standings
| Pos. | Team |
|---|---|
| 1st place, gold medalist(s) | South Africa |
| 2nd place, silver medalist(s) | Australia |
| 3rd place, bronze medalist(s) | New Zealand |
| 4 | Sri Lanka |
| 5 | Zimbabwe |
| 6 | Barbados |
| 7 | Pakistan |
| 8 | Antigua and Barbuda |
| 9 | India |
| 10 | Jamaica |
| 11 | Kenya |
| 12 | Northern Ireland |
| 13 | Scotland |
| 14 | Bangladesh |
| 15 | Canada |
| 16 | Malaysia |

== Statistics ==
Most runs
| Rank | Runs | Player | Team | Innings | Not outs | Average | HS | 100 | 50 |
|---|---|---|---|---|---|---|---|---|---|
| 1 | 234 | Avishka Gunawardene | Sri Lanka | 5 | 0 | 46.80 | 107 | 1 | 1 |
| 2 | 228 | Stephen Fleming | New Zealand | 5 | 0 | 45.60 | 102 | 1 | 1 |
| 3 | 215 | Steve Waugh | Australia | 3 | 3 | – | 100* | 1 | 1 |
| 4 | 186 | Philo Wallace | Barbados | 3 | 0 | 62.00 | 92 | 0 | 2 |
| 5 | 181 | Adam Parore | New Zealand | 5 | 1 | 45.25 | 87 | 0 | 1 |
Source: ESPNcricinfo

Most wickets
| Rank | Wickets | Player | Team | Innings | BBI | Average | Econ | SR | 5W |
|---|---|---|---|---|---|---|---|---|---|
| 1 | 14 | Damien Fleming | Australia | 5 | 5/24 | 9.42 | 3.47 | 16.28 | 1 |
| 2 | 11 | Chris Harris | New Zealand | 4 | 4/25 | 6.90 | 2.02 | 20.45 | 0 |
| 3 | 10 | Brad Young | Australia | 5 | 4/4 | 6.70 | 2.35 | 17.10 | 0 |
| 4 | 9 | Anil Kumble | India | 3 | 4/11 | 9.11 | 3.30 | 16.55 | 0 |
Source: ESPNcricinfo

== Legacy ==
Gold medal-winning South African captain Pollock praised the Commonwealth experience while recalling his time at the Games for ESPNcricinfo.

The success of the IPL led to a T20 tournament in the Commonwealth Games and later the Olympics being considered. The president of the Commonwealth Games Federation wanted to bring cricket back into the games, and the Glasgow bid for the 2014 games had indicated that they would include cricket, but it did not materialise. The ICC then rejected an offer for cricket to feature in the 2018 games on the Gold Coast, but a T20 women's tournament was held at Edgbaston for the 2022 games in Birmingham.

The next year at the 141st IOC Session in Mumbai in October 2023, cricket was added to the Olympic program in the form of men's and women's T20 events beginning in Los Angeles in 2028. It marks the first appearance of cricket as an Olympic sport since Paris in 1900.
