= Bangladesh at the 1998 Commonwealth Games =

- Flag of Bangladesh
- CG code: BAN
- CGA: Bangladesh Olympic Association
- Website: nocban.org

in Kuala Lumpur, Malaysia 11 September 1998 – 21 September 1998
- Medals: Gold 0 Silver 0 Bronze 0 Total 0

Commonwealth Games appearances (overview)
- 1978; 1982–1986; 1990; 1994; 1998; 2002; 2006; 2010; 2014; 2018; 2022; 2026; 2030

Bangladesh competed at the 1998 Commonwealth Games in Kuala Lumpur, Malaysia from 11 to 21 September 1998. It was Bangladesh's 4th appearance at the Commonwealth Games.

== Cricket ==
Bangladesh named the below squad for the tournament.

Roster

- Akram Khan (c)
- Faruque Ahmed
- Hasibul Hossain
- Shahriar Hossain
- Aminul Islam
- Azam Iqbal
- Morshed Ali Khan
- Khaled Mahmud
- Khaled Mashud (wk)
- Mohammad Rafique
- Mushfiqur Rahman
- Naimur Rahman
- Shafiuddin Ahmed

Summary

| Team | Event | Group stage | | | | Semifinal | Final / BM | |
| Team | Event | Opposition Result | Opposition Result | Opposition Result | Rank | Opposition Result | Opposition Result | Rank |
|---|---|---|---|---|---|---|---|---|
| Bangladesh men | Men's tournament | Barbados; L by 4 wickets (D/L) | South Africa; L by 5 wickets | Northern Ireland; L by 114 runs | 4 | did not advance | | 14 |

Group stage

Group C
| Pos | Team | Pld | W | L | T | NR | Pts | NRR |
|---|---|---|---|---|---|---|---|---|
| 1 | South Africa | 3 | 3 | 0 | 0 | 0 | 6 | 1.143 |
| 2 | Barbados | 3 | 2 | 1 | 0 | 0 | 4 | 1.330 |
| 3 | Northern Ireland | 3 | 1 | 2 | 0 | 0 | 2 | −0.643 |
| 4 | Bangladesh | 3 | 0 | 3 | 0 | 0 | 0 | −1.547 |

Source: ESPNcricinfo

10 September 1998
10:00
Scorecard

| Bangladesh; 144/7 (47 overs) | v | Barbados; 160/6 (41.3 overs) |
| Shahriar Hossain 70* (123); Henderson Bryan 3/32 (10 overs) | | Adrian Griffith 31; Naimur Rahman 2/30 (9 overs) |

Barbados won by 4 wickets (D/L method)
Royal Selangor Club, Kuala Lumpur
Umpires: Russell Tiffin (Zim) and Saleem Badar (Pak)

- Barbados won the toss and elected to field.
- The match was reduced to 47 overs per side due to rain, Barbados target was 160 runs.
- Points: Barbados 2, Bangladesh 0.

13 September 1998
10:00
Scorecard

| Bangladesh; 79 (38.4 overs) | v | South Africa; 80/5 (24.3 overs) |
| Faruque Ahmed 20 (48); Jacques Kallis 3/13 (7 overs) | | Herschelle Gibbs 26* (51); Mohammad Rafique 2/16 (7.3 overs) |

South Africa won by 5 wickets
Perbadanan Kemajuan Negeri Selangor Sports Complex, Petaling Jaya
Umpires: Eddie Nicholls (Guy) and Subhash Modi (Ken)

- South Africa won the toss and elected to field.
- Points: South Africa 2, Bangladesh 0.
- Bangladesh were eliminated as a result of this match.

15 September 1998
10:00
Scorecard

| Northern Ireland; 177 (49.5 overs) | v | Bangladesh; 63 (21 overs) |
| Kyle McCallan 53*; Morshed Ali Khan 2/19 (7 overs) | | Khaled Mahmud 27; Gordon Cooke 5/35 (10 overs) |

Northern Ireland won by 114 runs
Royal Selangor Club, Kuala Lumpur
Umpires: Nizam Baksh (Can) and Saleem Badar (Pak)

- Bangladesh won the toss and elected to field.
- Neil Anderson (NI) played his only List A match.
- Dekker Curry (NI) played his final List A match.
- Gordon Cooke (NI) took his only List A five-wicket haul.
- Points: Northern Ireland 2, Bangladesh 0.
