= Kenya at the 1998 Commonwealth Games =

- Flag of Kenya
- CG code: KEN
- CGA: National Olympic Committee of Kenya
- Website: teamke.or.ke

in Kuala Lumpur, Malaysia 11 September 1998 – 21 September 1998
- Medals Ranked 7th: Gold 8 Silver 5 Bronze 4 Total 17

Commonwealth Games appearances (overview)
- 1954; 1958; 1962; 1966; 1970; 1974; 1978; 1982; 1986; 1990; 1994; 1998; 2002; 2006; 2010; 2014; 2018; 2022; 2026; 2030

Kenya competed at the 1998 Commonwealth Games in Kuala Lumpur, Malaysia from 11 to 21 September 1998. It was Kenya's 11th appearance at the Commonwealth Games.

== Medalists ==
The following Kenyan competitors won medals at the games.

Medal	Name	Sport	Event
Gold	Japheth Kimutai	Athletics	Men's 800 metres
Gold	Laban Rotich	Athletics	Men's 1500 metres
Gold	Daniel Komen	Athletics	Men's 5000 metres
Gold	Simon Maina	Athletics	Men's 10,000 metres
Gold	John Kosgei	Athletics	Men's 3000 metres steeplechase
Gold	Jackline Maranga	Athletics	Women's 1500 metres
Gold	Esther Wanjiru	Athletics	Women's 10,000 metres
Silver	Tom Nyariki	Athletics	Men's 5000 metres
Silver	William Kalya	Athletics	Men's 10,000 metres
Silver	Bernard Barmasai	Athletics	Men's 3000 metres steeplechase
Silver	Moses Kinyua	Boxing	Light flyweight
Silver	Absolom Okoth	Boxing	Welterweight
Bronze	Richard Limo	Athletics	Men's 5000 metres
Bronze	Kipkurui Misoi	Athletics	Men's 3000 metres steeplechase
Bronze	Remmy Limo	Athletics	Men's triple jump
Bronze	Samuel Odindo	Boxing	Light heavyweight

== Cricket ==
Kenya named the below squad for the tournament.

Roster

- Aasif Karim (c)
- Sandip Gupta
- Edward Mboya
- Hitesh Modi
- Thomas Odoyo
- Maurice Odumbe
- Kennedy Otieno (wk)
- Ravindu Shah
- Tony Suji
- Martin Suji
- Steve Tikolo
- Alpesh Vadher

Summary

Team	Event	Group stage				Semifinal	Final / BM	
Team	Event	Opposition Result	Opposition Result	Opposition Result	Rank	Opposition Result	Opposition Result	Rank
Kenya men	Men's tournament	New Zealand; L by 5 wickets	Pakistan; L by 129 runs	Scotland; W by 5 wickets	3	did not advance		11

Group stage

Group D
Pos	Team	Pld	W	L	T	NR	Pts	NRR
1	New Zealand	3	3	0	0	0	6	1.799
2	Pakistan	3	1	1	0	1	3	0.480
3	Kenya	3	1	2	0	0	2	−0.697
4	Scotland	3	0	2	0	1	1	−2.401

Source: ESPNcricinfo

10 September 1998
10:00
Scorecard

Kenya; 144/8 (50 overs)	v	New Zealand; 145/5 (47.3 overs)
Steve Tikolo 35 (64); Chris Harris 3/7 (10 overs)		Matt Horne 39 (76); Maurice Odumbe 1/17 (10 overs)

New Zealand won by 5 wickets
Perbadanan Kemajuan Negeri Selangor Sports Complex, Petaling Jaya
Umpires: Darrell Hair (Aus) and Steve Bucknor (Jam)

- New Zealand won the toss and elected to field.
- Craig McMillan (NZ) scored his 2,000th List A run.
- Points: New Zealand 2, Kenya 0.

12 September 1998
10:00
Scorecard

Pakistan; 189/8 (50 overs)	v	Kenya; 60 (25.3 overs)
Wajahatullah Wasti 32; Thomas Odoyo 4/39 (10 overs)		Hitesh Modi 18; Arshad Khan 4/14 (8 overs)

Pakistan won by 129 runs
Rubber Research Institute Ground, Shah Alam
Umpires: K. T. Francis (SL) and Nizam Baksh (Can)

- Kenya won the toss and elected to field.
- Edward Mboya (Ken) made his List A debut.
- Points: Pakistan 2, Kenya 0.
- Kenya were eliminated as a result of this match.

15 September 1998
10:00
Scorecard

Scotland; 156/8 (50 overs)	v	Kenya; 157/5 (37.3 overs)
Bruce Patterson 31 (82); Maurice Odumbe 5/38 (10 overs)		Ravindu Shah 48 (63); Keith Sheridan 2/24 (10 overs)

Kenya won by 5 wickets
Rubber Research Institute Ground, Shah Alam
Umpires: Beattie Arlow (NI) and Steve Bucknor (Jam)

- Scotland won the toss and elected to bat.
- Edward Mboya (Ken) played his final List A match.
- Maurice Odumbe (Ken) took his only List A five-wicket haul.
- Points: Kenya 2, Scotland 0.
