= List of cricket grounds in Malaysia =

This is a list of cricket grounds in Malaysia. The grounds included in this list have held at least one first-class or List A match. One of the grounds has also hosted One Day Internationals. Some of the venues included in this list were used as venues in the cricket competition during the 1998 Commonwealth Games. All of the grounds in this list are within Klang Valley where the Malaysian capital of Kuala Lumpur is located.

Official name (known as)	City or town	Capacity	Notes	Ref
Kelab Aman	Jalan Ampang, Kuala Lumpur	1,000-3,000	Held five List A matches in the cricket competition during the 1998 Commonwealth Games	
Kinrara Academy Oval	Bandar Kinrara, Puchong, Selangor	4,000	Held neutral One Day Internationals during the 2006-07 DLF Cup	
Perbadanan Kemajuan Negeri Selangor Sports Complex	Kelana Jaya, Selangor	At least 7,532	Held seven List A matches in the cricket competition during the 1998 Commonwealth Games, including the final	
Royal Selangor Club	Kuala Lumpur		Held four List A matches in the cricket competition during the 1998 Commonwealth Games	
Rubber Research Institute	near Kota Damansara, Selangor	6,000	Held three List A matches in the cricket competition during the 1998 Commonwealth Games	
Selangor Turf Club	Kuala Lumpur		Held the only first-class match to be played in Malaysia when Malaysia played the UAE in the 2004 Intercontinental Cup	
Tenaga National Sports Complex	Kuala Lumpur	5,000	Held six List A matches in the cricket competition during the 1998 Commonwealth Games	
Victoria Institute	Kuala Lumpur		Held three List A matches in the cricket competition during the 1998 Commonwealth Games	
