= Northern Ireland national cricket team =

Northern Ireland
International Cricket Council
- ICC status: non-member
- ICC region: Europe

International cricket
- First international: 10 September 1998 v South Africa at Kuala Lumpur, Malaysia
- As of 24 November 2007

The Northern Ireland men's national cricket team is a representative cricket team for Northern Ireland. It does not play in International Cricket Council (ICC) competitions, as Northern Ireland is part of Cricket Ireland and is represented by the Ireland cricket team. However, a standalone Northern Ireland team has been formed on a few occasions.

== History ==
Cricket in Ireland is usually organised on an all-Ireland basis, with the national side representing both Northern Ireland and the Republic of Ireland. However, for the cricket tournament at the 1998 Commonwealth Games, a Northern Ireland team took part, as the Republic is not a member of the Commonwealth. It remains the only appearance of such a side in international cricket.

The tournament started for Northern Ireland with a match against South Africa. Northern Ireland scored 89/5 before rain brought an end to their innings in the 39th over. A target of 131 from 38 overs was set using the Duckworth-Lewis method for South Africa, which they achieved in the 32nd over, Dale Benkenstein scoring 44 not out. Ryan Eagleson took 3/28 for the Northern Irish team.

Their second match was against Barbados, and Barbados scored 296/5 from their 50 overs, Philo Wallace top scoring with 92. Northern Ireland could only score 120/7 in reply, Stephen Smyth top scoring with 58, losing by 176 runs.

Northern Ireland picked up their only win in their third match, against Bangladesh. Northern Ireland batted first and were bowled out for 177, with Kyle McCallan scoring an unbeaten 53. They then bowled out their opponents for 63 with Gordon Cooke taking five wickets.

== Players ==
The following players played for Northern Ireland in their only tournament:

- Neil Anderson
- Neil Carson
- Gordon Cooke
- Dekker Curry
- Ryan Eagleson
- Peter Gillespie
- Derek Heasley
- Kyle McCallan
- Paul McCrum
- Gary Neely
- Andrew Patterson
- Alan Rutherford
- Stephen Smyth

== Tournament history ==
=== Summer Olympics ===
Olympic Games record
Year	Round	Position	GP	W	L	T	NR	Win %
(Greece) 1896	No tournament							
(France) 1900	Champions	1/2	1	1	0	0	0	100.00
1904–2024	No tournament							
(United States) 2028	TBA							
(Australia) 2032	TBA							

=== Commonwealth Games ===
Commonwealth Games record
Year	Round	Position	GP	W	L	T	NR
(Malaysia) 1998	Group stage	12/16	3	1	2	0	0
Total	0 Title	1/1	3	1	2	0	0
