= Haidi =

Haidi may refer to:

- Haiti
  - Chinese Haitians
- Mustafa Haidi Makunganya Mkulo (26 September 1946 – 3 May 2024), Tanzanian politician
- Siswanto Haidi (born 22 February 1972), Malaysian cricketer
- Suona, Chinese musical instrument
- Zhang Haidi (born September 1955), Chinese writer
