= Chew Pok Cheong =

Malaysian cricketer

Personal information
- Born: 28 July 1970 (age 56); Johor, Malaysia
- Batting: Right-handed
- Bowling: Off spin

Career statistics
Competition	List A	ICC Trophy
Matches	4	3
Runs scored	7	4
Batting average	3.50	–
100s/50s	0/0	0/0
Top score	4*	4*
Balls bowled	72	90
Wickets	2	1
Bowling average	38.50	73.00
5 wickets in innings	0	0
10 wickets in match	0	0
Best bowling	2/50	1/21
Catches/stumpings	0/–	0/–
- Source: CricketArchive, 15 January 2008

Chew Pok Cheong (born 28 July 1970) is a Malaysian cricketer. A right-handed batsman and off spin bowler, he played for the Malaysia national cricket team between 1992 and 2002.

== Biography ==
Chew was born in Johor in 1970, and first represented Malaysia at Under-19 level, playing in the Youth Asia Cup in 1989. He made his debut for the senior side in September 1992, playing in the annual Saudara Cup match against Singapore. It was almost four years before his next match for Malaysia, playing one match in the Stan Nagaiah Trophy series against Singapore in February 1996.

He played in the Saudara Cup match in 1997, and played one match in the Stan Nagaiah Trophy series of 1998 before making his List A debut, playing two matches in the Wills Cup, a Pakistani domestic one-day competition. Later in the year he represented Malaysia in the cricket tournament at the 1998 Commonwealth Games, hosted in Kuala Lumpur. He also played in the ACC Trophy in Nepal the same year.

He played in the Saudara Cup and Stan Nagaiah Trophy in both 1999 and 2000 before playing three matches in the 2001 ICC Trophy in Toronto, Ontario, Canada. After playing in the ACC Trophy in Singapore in 2002. To date, his last match for Malaysia was in the Saudara Cup against Singapore in August 2002.

Chew later became the head coach of the Sarawak state cricket team. He was appointed an assistant coach of the Malaysian national cricket team in 2017.
