= Krishnamurthi Muniandy =

Malaysian cricketer

Personal information
- Full name: Krishnamurthi N Muniandy
- Born: 24 August 1980 (age 46); Penang, Malaysia
- Batting: Right-handed
- Bowling: Right-arm medium

Career statistics
Competition	First-class	ICC Trophy
Matches	2	5
Runs scored	24	39
Batting average	12.00	13.00
100s/50s	0/0	0/0
Top score	19*	15*
Balls bowled	24	151
Wickets	0	5
Bowling average	–	17.60
5 wickets in innings	–	0
10 wickets in match	–	0
Best bowling	–	3/15
Catches/stumpings	3/–	1/–
- Source: CricketArchive, 13 January 2008

N Krishnamurthi Muniandy (born 24 July 1980) is a Malaysian cricketer. A right-handed batsman and right-arm medium pace bowler, he has played for the Malaysia national cricket team since 1999, including two first-class matches.

== Biography ==
Born in Penang in 1980, Muniandy made his debut for Malaysia in 1999, when he played one match in that year's Stan Nagaiah Trophy series against Singapore. The following year, he played all three matches in the series, also playing in the Saudara Cup match against Singapore, before playing one match in that year's ACC Trophy, against Kuwait.

In 2001, he played for Malaysia at the ICC Trophy in Ontario, playing five matches in the tournament. He played only in the Stan Nagaiah Trophy series in 2002, and only in the Saudara Cup match in 2003. In 2004, he played twice for a Malaysia Cricket Association Invitation XI against England A, also playing for Malaysia in the Saudara Cup match, an ACC Trophy match against Saudi Arabia, and an ACC Fast Track Countries Tournament match against Hong Kong. He also made his first-class debut in 2004, playing ICC Intercontinental Cup matches against Nepal and the UAE.

He played in both the Saudara Cup match and Stan Nagaiah Trophy series in 2005 and 2006, also playing ACC Fast Track Countries Tournament matches against Singapore, Hong Kong and Nepal in 2005, ACC Premier League matches against Hong Kong and Nepal in 2006, and five matches in the 2006 ACC Trophy. He most recently represented his country in the 2007 Saudara Cup match.
