= Scott Thompson =

Scot(t) Thompson may refer to:

== Sportspeople ==
- Scott Thompson (footballer, born 1983), Australian rules footballer who played for Melbourne and Adelaide
- Scott Thompson (footballer, born 1986), Australian rules footballer who played for North Melbourne
- Scott Thompson (cricketer) (born 1972), Australian cricketer
- Scot Thompson (baseball) (born 1955), baseball outfielder
- Scott Thompson (basketball player), American basketball player
- Scott Thompson (wrestler) (born 1971), wrestler known as Krusher Kong
- Scott Thompson (basketball coach), American college basketball coach
- Scot Thompson (born 1981), American soccer player

== Others ==
- Scott Thompson (actor) (born 1959), Canadian actor and comedian
- Scott Thompson (businessman) (born 1957), former CEO of Yahoo! and former president of PayPal
- Scott Thompson (musician), American musician
- Carrot Top (Scott Thompson, born 1965), American comedian

== See also ==
- Scott Thomson (disambiguation)
