= Marimuthu Muniandy =

Malaysian cricketer (born 1971)

Personal information
- Full name: Marimuthu A Muniandy
- Born: 28 February 1971 (age 55); Ipoh, Perak, Malaysia
- Batting: Right-handed
- Bowling: Right-arm fast-medium
- Role: Bowler

Career statistics
Competition	FC	LA	ICC T
Matches	1	5	25
Runs scored	9	40	79
Batting average	4.50	10.00	6.58
100s/50s	0/0	0/0	0/0
Top score	6	17	31*
Balls bowled	67	120	1,090
Wickets	1	1	23
Bowling average	39.00	168.00	23.17
5 wickets in innings	0	0	0
10 wickets in match	0	0	0
Best bowling	1/22	1/67	4/17
Catches/stumpings	0/0	2/0	5/0
- Source: CricketArchive, 12 January 2008

Marimuthu A Muniandy (born 28 February 1971) is a Malaysian former cricketer. A right-handed batsman and right-arm fast-medium bowler, he played for the Malaysia national cricket team between 1990 and 2005.

== Biography ==
=== Early career ===
Born in Ipoh in 1971, Muniandy first represented his country at Under-19 level, playing in the Asia Youth Cup in Bangladesh in December 1989. He made his debut for the senior side the following year when he played against Zimbabwe in the 1990 ICC Trophy in the Netherlands. He played six further games in the tournament.

He played in the annual Saudara Cup match against Singapore for the first time in August 1991, also playing in the fixture in 1993, before playing in the 1994 ICC Trophy in Nairobi in February the following year. He played in the Saudara Cup matches of 1994, 1995 and 1996, and played in the Stan Nagaiah Trophy series for the first time in 1995.

Malaysia hosted the 1997 ICC Trophy, and Muniandy was in the Malaysian squad for the tournament. He played in the Saudara Cup and Stan Nagaiah Trophy in 1998, a year in which he made his List A debut for Malaysia against Pakistan International Airlines. He played four matches in the Wills Cup, a Pakistani domestic one-day tournament, also playing a List A match against Sri Lanka in September, as part of the cricket tournament of the 1998 Commonwealth Games, hosted in Kuala Lumpur. He played for Malaysia in the ACC Trophy the following month. He won the man of the match award after taking 4/11 against Hong Kong in the semi-final, but could not prevent Malaysia losing to Bangladesh in the final.

=== Later career ===
He missed the Stan Nagaiah Trophy series in 1999, and the Saudara Cup match in 2000, but aside from that, played in the annual matches against Singapore every year until 2005. He played in his last ICC Trophy tournament in 2001, also playing for Malaysia against the ECB National Academy in 2003, and for a Malaysia Cricket Association Invitation XI against England A in 2004. He played in the ACC Trophy tournaments of 2000, 2002 and 2004, a year in which he played his only first-class match, playing against Nepal in the ICC Intercontinental Cup.

He also played an ACC Fast Track Countries Tournament match against Hong Kong in 2004, and last played for his country in 2005, playing ACC Fast Track Countries Tournament matches against Singapore, Hong Kong and Nepal.
