= Ramesh Menon (cricketer) =

Malaysian cricketer (born 1963)

Personal information
- Born: 14 December 1963 (age 62); Malacca, Malaysia
- Batting: Right-handed
- Bowling: Off spin

Career statistics
Competition	List A	ICC Trophy
Matches	7	13
Runs scored	69	188
Batting average	9.85	15.66
100s/50s	0/0	0/0
Top score	19	49*
Balls bowled	220	669
Wickets	5	15
Bowling average	41.20	22.80
5 wickets in innings	0	0
10 wickets in match	0	0
Best bowling	2/30	3/43
Catches/stumpings	2/–	3/–
- Source: CricketArchive, 18 January 2008

Ramesh Menon (born 14 December 1963) is a Malaysian former cricketer. A right-handed batsman and right-arm off spin bowler, he played for the Malaysia national cricket team between 1993 and 2001.

== Biography ==
Born in Malacca in 1963, Ramesh Menon made his debut for Malaysia in the 1993 Saudara Cup match against Singapore, next playing for them in the 1994 ICC Trophy in Nairobi. He also played in the Saudara Cup that year, and the next, during which he played in the Stan Nagaiah Trophy series for the first time.

He played two matches in the Stan Nagaiah Trophy in 1996, and all three in 1997, before playing in the 1997 ICC Trophy in Kuala Lumpur. In 1998, after playing in the Stan Nagaiah Trophy series, he made his List A debut against Pakistan International Airlines in the Wills Cup, a Pakistani domestic one-day competition. After playing in his final Saudara Cup match in August, he represented Malaysia in the cricket tournament at the 1998 Commonwealth Games, hosted in Kuala Lumpur.

Following the Commonwealth Games, he played in the ACC Trophy in Nepal in October. He did not play for Malaysia at all in 1999, returning to play twice in 2000 and three times in 2001, all in the Stan Nagaiah Trophy series.
