= Rohan Suppiah =

Malaysian cricketer

Personal information
- Full name: Rohan Vishnu Suppiah
- Born: 23 March 1981 (age 45); Kuala Lumpur, Malaysia
- Batting: Right-handed
- Bowling: Off spin
- Role: Bowler

Domestic team information
- Years: Team
- 1998–2004: Malaysia
- FC debut: 23 April 2004 Malaysia v Nepal
- Last FC: 17 September 2004 Malaysia v UAE
- LA debut: 17 March 1998 Malaysia v Pakistan International Airlines
- Last LA: 14 September 1998 Malaysia v Jamaica

Career statistics
| Competition | FC | LA | ICC T |
|---|---|---|---|
| Matches | 2 | 4 | 5 |
| Runs scored | 14 | 1 | 21 |
| Batting average | 3.50 | – | 7.00 |
| 100s/50s | 0/0 | 0/0 | 0/0 |
| Top score | 9 | 1* | 15 |
| Balls bowled | 234 | 114 | 282 |
| Wickets | 1 | 4 | 9 |
| Bowling average | 108.00 | 28.75 | 16.00 |
| 5 wickets in innings | 0 | 0 | 0 |
| 10 wickets in match | 0 | 0 | 0 |
| Best bowling | 1/32 | 1/20 | 4/24 |
| Catches/stumpings | 0/0 | 0/0 | 3/0 |
- Source: CricketArchive, 15 January 2008

Rohan Vishnu Suppiah (born 23 March 1981) is a Malaysian cricketer. A right-handed batsman and off spin bowler, he has played for the Malaysia national cricket team since 1997. His younger brother Arul also plays for Malaysia, and currently plays county cricket for Somerset and is a former T20 world record holder.

== Life and career ==
Born in Kuala Lumpur in 1981, Suppiah first played for Malaysia in the annual Saudara Cup match against Singapore in September 1997. He played in the Stan Nagaiah Trophy series against Singapore the following February. He made his List A debut the month after that, playing for Malaysia in the Wills Cup, a Pakistani domestic one-day tournament, against Pakistan International Airlines and Lahore City.

After playing in the Saudara Cup match that August, Suppiah represented Malaysia in the cricket tournament at the 1998 Commonwealth Games, hosted in his home city of Kuala Lumpur, in September, playing against Sri Lanka and Jamaica. He played in both the Saudara Cup and Stan Nagaiah Trophy the following year but missed the Saudara Cup in 2000.

He did play in the ACC Trophy in the United Arab Emirates in 2000 and 2001. After playing in the Stan Nagaiah Trophy, he went to Ontario, Canada, to play in the ICC Trophy. He did not play for Malaysia in 2002, returning for a match against the ECB National Academy in February 2003.

He started 2004 with two matches for a Malaysia Cricket Association Invitation XI against England A and the Stan Nagaiah Trophy before making his first-class debut against Nepal in the ICC Intercontinental Cup. He played in the ACC Trophy and Saudara Cup in June and August respectively, playing a second Intercontinental Cup match against the UAE in September. He finished the year with an ACC Fast Track Countries Tournament match against Hong Kong.

He has been a regular member of the Malaysian side since 2005, playing ACC Fast Track Countries Tournament matches against Singapore, Hong Kong, and Nepal; ACC Premier League matches against Hong Kong, Nepal and the UAE; the 2006 ACC Trophy, in addition to the annual Saudara Cup and Stan Nagaiah Trophy matches, though he missed the Saudara Cup in 2006 and the Stan Nagaiah Trophy was not played in 2007. Suppiah represented his country in the 2007 ACC Twenty20 Cup in Kuwait.
