= Mark Lavine =

West Indian cricketer (1973–2001)

Mark Lavine (4 March 1973 – 12 May 2001) was a West Indian cricketer. He was a right-handed batsman and right-arm fast bowler and a cousin of Gordon Greenidge. He played first-class and List A cricket for Barbados in the West Indies and for North West in South Africa. He also represented Barbados in the cricket tournament at the 1998 Commonwealth Games. He died aged 28 of a heart attack while playing league cricket in Coventry, England. He is the brother of Eric Lavine
