= Alan Dawson (cricketer) =

South African cricketer (born 1969)

Personal information
- Born: 27 November 1969 (age 56); Cape Town, Cape Province
- Batting: Right-handed
- Bowling: Right-arm medium-fast

Domestic team information
- Years: Team
- 1992/93–2004/05: Western Province
- 2005/06–2006/07: Western Province Boland/Cape Cobras

Career statistics
Competition	Test	ODI
Matches	2	19
Runs scored	10	69
Batting average	10.00	23.00
100s/50s	0/0	0/0
Top score	10	23*
Balls bowled	252	901
Wickets	5	21
Bowling average	23.39	34.04
5 wickets in innings	0	0
10 wickets in match	0	0
Best bowling	2/20	4/49
Catches/stumpings	0/–	2/–
Medal record
Representing South Africa
Men's Cricket
Commonwealth Games
Gold medal – first place	1998 Kuala Lumpur	List-A cricket
- Source: ESPNcricinfo, 25 January 2006

Alan Charles Dawson (born 27 November 1969) is a South African cricketer who played two Test matches and 19 One Day Internationals (ODI) for South Africa as a seam bowler. Dawson was a member of the South Africa team that won the 1998 ICC KnockOut Trophy, the only ICC trophy the country has won till date.

He was born in Cape Town, Cape Province. His international career lasted from 1998 to 2004, yielding 21 ODI wickets at a bowling average of 34.04 and five Test wickets at 23.39. However, both of his Tests were against bottom-ranked Bangladesh.

Dawson's best international performance occurred in the semi-final of the Commonwealth Games in Kuala Lumpur in 1998. South Africa had lost nine wickets when Dawson joined Nicky Boje at the crease. They put on a partnership to steer South Africa into the final, where they beat Australia (captained by Steve Waugh)

Dawson's best batting in first-class cricket occurred in a Supersport Series final when Western Province had lost much of their upper order and Dawson and Eric Simons rescued them to post a decent total which they defended.

In February 2020, he was named in South Africa's squad for the Over-50s Cricket World Cup in South Africa. However, the tournament was cancelled during the third round of matches due to the coronavirus pandemic.

Sporting positions
Preceded by Joe Scuderi	Nelson Cricket Club professional 1997	Succeeded by Roger Harper
