= Audley Sanson =

West Indian cricketer (born 1974)

Audley Sanson (born 5 November 1974 in Jamaica) is a West Indian cricketer. He is a right-handed batsman and a right-arm fast bowler. He has played six first-class matches for Jamaica, and also played one List A match as part of the cricket tournament at the 1998 Commonwealth Games.

Audley Sanson played his early cricket at Garvey Maceo High School under coach Derrick Azan. During his time as a player at Garvey Maceo Audley assisted the team in 1991 to lift both the Headley Cup trophy for rural school boy cricket and the Spaulding cup for all Island School boy Championship. He is a science and agriculture teacher having received the Michael Manley cricket scholarship which enabled him to read for an ASc degree in General Agriculture. He still plays for his local club team Kingston Cricket Club, but has retired from first class cricket.
