= Rohan Selvaratnam =

Malaysian cricketer

Personal information
- Full name: Rohan Mark Selvaratnam
- Born: 12 March 1974 (age 52); Johor, Malaysia
- Batting: Right-handed
- Bowling: Right-arm medium

Career statistics
| Competition | FC | LA | ICC T |
|---|---|---|---|
| Matches | 2 | 7 | 17 |
| Runs scored | 130 | 48 | 245 |
| Batting average | 32.50 | 9.60 | 20.41 |
| 100s/50s | 0/2 | 0/0 | 0/1 |
| Top score | 56 | 21* | 53* |
| Balls bowled | 0 | 90 | 360 |
| Wickets | – | 3 | 11 |
| Bowling average | – | 40.33 | 20.72 |
| 5 wickets in innings | – | 0 | 0 |
| 10 wickets in match | – | 0 | 0 |
| Best bowling | – | 2/41 | 2/9 |
| Catches/stumpings | 0/0 | 1/0 | 6/0 |
- Source: CricketArchive, 14 January 2008

Rohan Mark Selvaratnam (born 12 March 1974) is a Malaysian cricketer. A right-handed batsman and right-arm medium pace bowler, he has played for the Malaysia national cricket team since 1993.

== Biography ==
=== Early career ===
Born in Johor in 1974, Selvaratnam first represented his country at Under-19 level, playing in the Youth Asia Cup in Bangladesh in 1989 when only 15. He made his debut for the senior side three years later, playing in the VOLVO cup quadrangular in Thailand also involving Singapore, Hong Kong, and the host nation. His first major tournament was the 1994 ICC Trophy tournament in Nairobi.

He played in the annual Stan Nagaiah Trophy series against Singapore for the first time in February 1995. He played in the series every year from then on until 2001. He returned to the Saudara Cup match in 1997, playing in that match every year until 2004, except for 2002. He played in the 1997 ICC Trophy, which was held in Malaysia. For many years in between, he served as vice-captain of the Malaysian team and in 1998 captained Malaysia for the first time in the Saudara Cup.

In 1998, he made his List A debut, playing for Malaysia against the Pakistan International Airlines cricket team in the Wills Cup, a Pakistani domestic competition. Later in the year, he represented Malaysia in the cricket tournament of the 1998 Commonwealth Games, hosted in Kuala Lumpur. He played in the ACC Trophy in Nepal the same year.

=== Later career ===
He played in the 2000 ACC Trophy, and in the 2001 ICC Trophy in Ontario the following year where he returned to captained Malaysia. He did not play for Malaysia in 2002, returning for a match against the ECB National Academy in February 2003, also playing in the Saudara Cup match later in the year. He made his first-class debut in 2004, playing against Nepal and the UAE in the ICC Intercontinental Cup. He also played in the ACC Trophy that year, in addition to an ACC Fast Track Countries Tournament match against Hong Kong.

In 2005, he played ACC Fast Track Countries Tournament matches against Singapore, Hong Kong, and Nepal, also returning to the Stan Nagaiah Trophy series for the first time in four years. He played in the series again the following year, also playing ACC Premier League matches against Hong Kong, Nepal, and the UAE, and in that year's ACC Trophy. He most recently represented his country in the 2007 ACC Twenty20 Cup, where he played against Nepal and Oman.
