= Neil Carson =

Irish cricketer (born 1973)

Neil David Carson
Personal information
- Born: 25 January 1973 (age 53); Banbridge, County Down, Northern Ireland
- Batting: Left-handed
- Bowling: Right-arm fast-medium

Career statistics
Competition	First-class	List A
Matches	2	6
Runs scored	30	111
Batting average	7.50	22.20
100s/50s	0/0	0/1
Top score	24	58
Balls bowled	126	–
Wickets	4	–
Bowling average	18.5	–
5 wickets in innings	0	–
10 wickets in match	0	–
Best bowling	3/39	–
Catches/stumpings	0/–	0/–
- Source: CricketArchive, 30 December 2021

Neil David Carson (born 25 January 1973 in Banbridge, County Down, Northern Ireland) is a former Northern Irish cricketer. He was a left-handed batsman and right-arm medium-pace bowler. His career playing for Ireland got off to an excellent start in 1998 with a half-century against Bangladesh, and he went on to represent his country on 22 occasions, including two first-class and three List A matches. He also represented Northern Ireland in the cricket tournament at the 1998 Commonwealth Games, a tournament which consisted of his first three List A matches.
