= Matthew William =

Malaysian cricketer

Personal information
- Full name: Matthew Arthur William
- Born: 31 December 1976 (age 49); Kota Kinabalu, Sabah, Malaysia
- Batting: Right-handed
- Bowling: Off spin
- Role: Batsman

Career statistics
Competition	FC	LA	ICC T
Matches	1	7	9
Runs scored	43	124	173
Batting average	21.50	17.71	24.71
100s/50s	0/0	0/0	0/2
Top score	27	45	58
Balls bowled	0	39	6
Wickets	–	0	0
Bowling average	–	–	–
5 wickets in innings	–	–	–
10 wickets in match	–	–	–
Best bowling	–	–	–
Catches/stumpings	1/0	4/0	1/0
- Source: CricketArchive, 15 January 2008

Matthew Arthur William (born 31 December 1976) is a Malaysian cricketer. A right-handed batsman and off spin bowler, he played for the Malaysia national cricket team between 1995 and 2004.

== Biography ==
Matthew William was born in Sabah in 1976, Matthew William made his debut for Malaysia in the Stan Nagaiah Trophy series against Singapore in 1995. He did not play for them in 1996, returning for the same series in February 1997. He represented Malaysia at the 1997 ICC Trophy, which was played in Kuala Lumpur.

After playing in the Saudara Cup match for the only time in September 1997, he made his List A debut in 1998, playing four matches for Malaysia in the Wills Cup, a Pakistani domestic one-day tournament. Later in the year he represented Malaysia in the cricket tournament at the 1998 Commonwealth Games, hosted in Kuala Lumpur. After playing in the ACC Trophy in Nepal that year, he missed 1999, and played in the Stan Nagaiah Trophy series for the final time in 2000.

He also played in the ACC Trophy tournaments of 2000, 2002, and 2004. The 2004 tournament was the last time, to date, that he played for Malaysia. He played his only first-class match in 2004, an ICC Intercontinental Cup match against Nepal.
