= Shankar Retinam =

Malaysian cricketer

Shanker Retinam
Personal information
- Born: 3 September 1975 (age 51); Kuala Lumpur, Malaysia
- Batting: Right-handed
- Role: Wicket-keeper

Career statistics
Competition	FC	LA	ICC T
Matches	1	3	5
Runs scored	23	13	157
Batting average	11.50	4.33	31.40
100s/50s	0/0	0/0	1/0
Top score	20	7	118
Catches/stumpings	4/0	1/0	5/2
- Source: CricketArchive, 13 January 2008

Shankar Retinam (born 3 November 1975) is a Malaysian cricketer. A right-handed batsman and wicket-keeper, he has played for the Malaysia national cricket team since 1997.

== Biography ==
Born in Kuala Lumpur in 1975, Retinam made his debut for Malaysia in 1997, playing in that year's Saudara Cup match against Singapore. He made his List A debut the following year, playing for Malaysia in the Wills Cup, a Pakistani domestic one-day tournament, against the Agriculture Development Bank of Pakistan and Gujranwala. Later in the year he played for Malaysia in the cricket tournament at the 1998 Commonwealth Games, hosted in his home city, playing one match against Jamaica.

He played in the Stan Nagaiah Trophy series against Singapore for the first time in 1999, also playing in that year's Saudara Cup match. He played in the same tournaments again the following year, in addition to the ACC Trophy in the United Arab Emirates. He played five matches in the 2001 ICC Trophy in Ontario, scoring 118 against France, the highest individual score for Malaysia in the ICC Trophy.

He played in the Stan Nagaiah Trophy series and the ACC Trophy in 2002, and played just once the year after. He played his only first-class match in 2004, an ICC Intercontinental Cup match against the UAE. He also played the Saudara Cup match against Singapore, ACC Trophy matches against Kuwait and Saudi Arabia and an ACC Fast Track Countries Tournament match against Hong Kong in 2004, in addition to playing for a Malaysia Cricket Association Invitation XI against England A.

In 2005 he played the Saudara Cup match against Singapore and ACC Fast Track Countries Tournament matches against Hong Kong and Nepal. He played ACC Fast Track Countries Tournament matches against Hong Kong and Nepal in 2006, and most recently represented his country in an ACC Premier League match against the UAE in March 2007.
