= Mohammad Javed =

Pakistani cricketer (born 1969)

Personal information
- Born: 4 May 1969 (age 57); Karachi, Pakistan
- Batting: Right-handed
- Bowling: Right-arm medium
- Role: All-rounder

Mohammad Javed (born 4 May 1969), also known as Mohammad Jawed, is a former Pakistani cricketer.

He played as a right-handed batsman and right-arm medium pace bowler, and appeared in over 100 matches in both first-class and List A cricket for various teams in Pakistan. Despite reaching the highest level of Pakistani domestic cricket, he never represented them in Tests or One Day Internationals, although he did represent them in two matches in the cricket tournament at the 1998 Commonwealth Games.
