= Scott Thomson =

Scott Thomson may refer to:

- L. Scott Thomson (born 1970), Canadian businessman
- Scott A. Thomson, taxonomist and herpetologist
- Scott Y. Thomson (born 1966), Scottish football goalkeeper
- Scott M. Thomson (born 1972), Scottish footballer
- Scott Thomson (actor) (born 1957), American actor
- Scott Thomson (baseball) (born 1968), American college baseball coach

== See also ==
- Scott Thompson (disambiguation)
