= Anthony Lake (cricketer) =

West Indian cricketer (born 1974)

Anthony Lake (born 22 March 1974 in Antigua) is a West Indian cricketer. He is a right-handed batsman and a right-arm off-break bowler. He has played 12 first-class and 26 List A matches in his career, mainly for the Leeward Islands. He also represented Antigua and Barbuda in the cricket tournament at the 1998 Commonwealth Games, and was most recently seen playing for them in the Stanford 20/20 in 2006.
