= Ingleton Liburd =

Canadian cricketer (born 1961)

Personal information
- Born: 27 April 1961 (age 65); Trinidad
- Batting: Left-handed
- Bowling: Right-arm medium

International information
- National side: Canada

Career statistics
Competition	List A
Matches	13
Runs scored	216
Batting average	18.00
100s/50s	0/2
Top score	78
Balls bowled	208
Wickets	2
Bowling average	90.50
5 wickets in innings	0
10 wickets in match	0
Best bowling	1/40
Catches/stumpings	4/–
- Source: CricketArchive, 14 October 2011

Ingleton Liburd (born 27 April 1961) is a Canadian former cricketer. He was a top-order batsman who made his name playing for St Kitts and Leeward Islands Under-19s, but his career in the Caribbean ended when he moved to Canada where he established himself in the national side, playing in three ICC Trophies as well as the 1998 Commonwealth Games where he captained them. He served as president of the St. Kitts Cricket Association and as a territorial development officer for the West Indies Cricket Board before joining Cricket Canada as its cricket development officer in 2008. In 2009 he was the surprise choice as interim chief executive after the surprise removal of Atul Ahuja. He made his début for Canada in a match against Barbados in 1987. He represented Canada at three ICC Trophy tournaments and in 13 List A matches, including the cricket tournament at the 1998 Commonwealth Games.

He was later the General Manager of Cricket Canada.
