= Suleman Huda =

Pakistani cricketer (born 1975)

Personal information
- Born: 14 July 1975 (age 51)
- Source: Cricinfo, 8 March 2019

Suleman Huda (born 14 July 1975) is a Pakistani former cricketer. He played in 20 first-class and 26 List A matches between 1996 and 2001. He was also part of Pakistan's squad for the cricket tournament at the 1998 Commonwealth Games.
