= Sarath Jayawardene =

Sri Lankan cricketer

Personal information
- Full name: Walikalage Sarath Peiris Jayawardene
- Born: 22 July 1969 (age 57); Panadura, Sri Lanka
- Batting: Right-handed
- Bowling: Right-arm medium

Domestic team information
- Years: Team
- 1989–2007: Panadura Sports Club
- 1991–1992: Western Province Suburbs
- 1992: Sri Lanka Board Under-23s XI
- 1994–1995: Western Province South
- 1995–1997: Antonians Sports Club
- 2004: Malaysia
- FC debut: 31 March 1989 Panadura Sports Club v Nomads Sports Club
- Last FC: 23 February 2007 Panadura Sports Club v Lankan Cricket Club
- LA debut: 26 January 1993 Panadura Sports Club v Nondescripts Cricket Club
- Last LA: 4 December 2005 Panadura Sports Club v Sinhalese Sports Club

Career statistics
Competition	FC	LA	T20
Matches	114	16	5
Runs scored	4,404	303	88
Batting average	23.55	20.20	22.00
100s/50s	4/24	0/0	0/1
Top score	133	45	50
Balls bowled	10,703	744	60
Wickets	181	33	5
Bowling average	32.33	14.36	12.60
5 wickets in innings	5	0	0
10 wickets in match	1	0	0
Best bowling	6/40	4/13	3/25
Catches/stumpings	52/–	4/–	1/0
- Source: CricketArchive, 6 January 2008

Walikalage Sarath Peiris Jayawardene, usually known as Sarath Jayawardene (born 22 July 1969) is a Sri Lankan cricketer who has also played for Malaysia. A right-handed batsman and right-arm medium pace bowler, he had two stints playing first-class cricket in Sri Lanka, one from 1989 to 2002 and the other from 2005 to 2007. He played for Malaysia in 2003 and 2004.

== Biography ==
=== Initial Sri Lankan first-class career ===
Born in Panadura in 1969, Jayawardene made his first-class debut for Panadura Sports Club against Nomads Sports Club in March 1989. He continued playing for his home town club until 1995, when he moved to Antonians Sports Club. He also played first-class cricket for Western Province South, Western Province Suburbs and a Sri Lanka Board Under-23s XI in the same time period. His List A debut came in January 1993 when he played for Panadura Sports Club against Nondescripts Cricket Club.

He played his first first-class match for Antonians Sports Club against Sinhalese Sports Club in November 1995 and continued to play for them until 1997. He played just one List A match for them in this time. He returned to Panadura Sports Club in 1999 and played for them until 2002, when he began to play for Malaysia.

=== Malaysian international career ===
He made his debut for Malaysia in a match against the ECB National Academy in February 2003. He then played in that year's Stan Nagaiah Trophy series against Singapore. He played for a Malaysian Cricket Association Invitation XI against England A in February 2004, also playing in the Stan Nagaiah Trophy for a second time the same month.

He played two first-class matches for Malaysia throughout 2004, playing Nepal and the UAE in the ICC Intercontinental Cup. The match against the UAE was his last for Malaysia. He played matches in the 2004 ACC Trophy against Kuwait and Saudi Arabia between the two Intercontinental Cup matches.

=== Return to Sri Lanka ===
He returned to play for Panadura Sports Club in October 2005 when he played a Twenty20 match against Chilaw Marians Cricket Club. After two further Twenty20 matches, he returned to first-class cricket with them in December 2005 with a match against Moors Sports Club.

He continued playing for Panadura Sports Club throughout 2006 and into 2007, his last first-class match to date coming against Lankan Cricket Club in February 2007. He most recently played for Panadura in a Twenty20 match against Tamil Union Cricket and Athletic Club in March 2007.
