= Brad Young (cricketer) =

Australian cricketer (born 1973)

Bradley Young
Personal information
- Full name: Bradley Evan Young
- Born: 23 February 1973 (age 53); Adelaide, South Australia
- Batting: Right-handed
- Bowling: Slow left-arm orthodox
- Role: bowler

International information
- National side: Australia
- ODI debut (cap 138): 18 January 1998 v South Africa
- Last ODI: 13 January 1999 v Sri Lanka

Domestic team information
- Years: Team
- 1996/97–2002/03: South Australia

Career statistics
Competition	ODI	FC	LA	T20
Matches	6	54	65	5
Runs scored	31	2,119	660	12
Batting average	15.50	28.63	16.50	12.00
100s/50s	0/0	3/8	0/1	0/0
Top score	18	122	56	9*
Balls bowled	234	13,038	2,574	108
Wickets	1	141	56	5
Bowling average	251.00	44.71	37.35	24.00
5 wickets in innings	0	5	0	0
10 wickets in match	0	0	0	0
Best bowling	1/26	6/85	4/4	2/37
Catches/stumpings	2/–	44/–	36/–	0/–
Medal record
Representing Australia
Men's Cricket
Commonwealth Games
Silver medal – second place	1998 Kuala Lumpur	List-A cricket
- Source: CricInfo, 4 June 2021

Bradley Evan Young (born 23 February 1973) is an Australian former cricketer. A left-arm orthodox spinner who was also an aggressive lower order right hand batsman, Young played six One Day Internationals for Australia in the 1998/99 period. Young was selected for Australia at the 1998 Commonwealth Games in Kuala Lumpur, taking a hat trick against New Zealand and winning a silver medal after losing to South Africa in the final.

Young's final match for Australia ended after he slid into the fence trying to prevent a boundary and needed to be carried from the Sydney Cricket Ground in considerable pain after injuring his leg.

In 1998 and 2001 Young was the professional for Lancashire League team East Lancashire Cricket Club.

On 12 December 2012, Young signed with the Adelaide Strikers, as a replacement for the injured Jon Holland.

Young held the record of the most deliveries needed by an Australian to claim his first One Day International wicket when he took 201 deliveries before being overtaken by Glenn Maxwell in February 2013.
