= David Thalalla =

Malaysian cricketer (born 1963)

Personal information
- Born: 28 August 1963 (age 63); Kuala Lumpur, Malaysia
- Batting: Right-handed
- Bowling: Right-arm medium
- Role: Batsman

Career statistics
Competition	List A	ICC Trophy
Matches	7	7
Runs scored	122	187
Batting average	20.33	31.16
100s/50s	0/0	1/0
Top score	46	112*
Balls bowled	66	64
Wickets	1	1
Bowling average	111.00	72.00
5 wickets in innings	0	0
10 wickets in match	0	0
Best bowling	1/34	1/22
Catches/stumpings	1/0	2/0
- Source: CricketArchive, 19 January 2008

David Thalalla (born 28 August 1963) is a Malaysian former cricketer. A right-handed batsman and right-arm medium pace bowler, he played for the Malaysia national cricket team between 1994 and 1998.

== Biography ==
Born in Kuala Lumpur in 1963, David Thalalla first played for Malaysia in the 1994 ICC Trophy in Nairobi. He next played in September 1995, playing in the annual Saudara Cup match against Singapore. He didn't play again until February 1998 when he played in the Stan Nagaiah Trophy series against Singapore.

After the Stan Nagaiah Trophy series, Thalalla made his List A debut, playing for Malaysia in the Wills Cup, a Pakistani domestic one-day competition. After playing in the Saudara Cup match in August, his last appearance for Malaysia was in the cricket tournament of the 1998 Commonwealth Games, hosted in his home city of Kuala Lumpur.
