= Horace Walrond =

Barbadian cricketer (born 1971)

Personal information
- Born: 22 September 1971 (age 55); Barbados
- Source: Cricinfo, 17 November 2020

Horace Walrond (born 22 September 1971) is a Barbadian cricketer. He played in fourteen first-class and fourteen List A matches for the Barbados cricket team from 1992 to 2000. He also represented Barbados in the cricket tournament at the 1998 Commonwealth Games.

== See also ==
- List of Barbadian representative cricketers
