= Rakesh Madhavan =

Malaysian cricketer

Personal information
- Born: 23 February 1977 (age 49); Negeri Sembilan, Malaysia
- Batting: Left-handed
- Bowling: Right-arm medium
- Role: Batsman

Career statistics
Competition	FC	LA	ICC T
Matches	2	6	5
Runs scored	151	68	191
Batting average	37.75	11.33	47.75
100s/50s	0/1	0/0	1/0
Top score	60	37	105*
Catches/stumpings	1/0	0/0	1/0
- Source: CricketArchive, 8 January 2008

Rakesh Madhavan (born 23 February 1977) is a Malaysian cricketer. A left-handed batsman and right-arm medium pace bowler, he has played for the Malaysia national cricket team since 1997.

== Biography ==
Born in Negeri Sembilan in 1977, Madhavan made his debut for Malaysia in the annual Saudara Cup match against Singapore in September 1997. The following year he played in the Stan Nagaiah Trophy against Singapore before making his List A debut against Pakistan International Airlines in the Pakistan domestic one-day tournament.

He played a second Saudara Cup match in August before representing Malaysia in the cricket tournament at the 1998 Commonwealth Games, hosted in Kuala Lumpur, playing against Sri Lanka, Zimbabwe and Jamaica. He finished the year playing in the ACC Trophy, with Malaysia losing to Bangladesh in the final.

Over the following years, he became almost an ever present for Malaysia, playing in every Stan Nagaiah Trophy and Saudara Cup match against Singapore until 2005, also playing in the ACC Trophy tournaments of 2000, 2002 and 2004 over the same time period, in addition to a match for Malaysia against the ECB National Academy in February 2003. He also played in the 2001 ICC Trophy in Toronto.

He made his first-class debut in 2004, playing against Nepal and the UAE in the ICC Intercontinental Cup. He played ACC Fast Track Countries Tournament matches against Hong Kong in 2004 and against Singapore, Hong Kong and Nepal in 2005.

He did not play in the Saudara Cup match of 2006, though he did play in that year's Stan Nagaiah Trophy and ACC Trophy, in addition to ACC Premier League matches against Hong Kong and Nepal. He most recently represented his country in the 2007 Saudara Cup.
