= Ryan Cunningham =

West Indian cricketer (born 1978)

Ryan Cunningham (born 29 May 1978 in Kingston, Jamaica) is a West Indian cricketer. He is a left-handed batsman and a left-arm spin bowler. He has played 29 first-class and eight List A matches, mainly for Jamaica. He represented Jamaica at the 1998 Commonwealth Games. He currently plays at Crouch End cricket club.

Cunningham has over 18 years of experience as a cricket coach coupled with 8 years playing first class cricket with and against arguably some of the best cricketers in the world. He describes his approach to coaching as 'dynamic, forward-thinking and player led'.
