= Neil Anderson (cricketer) =

Irish cricketer

Personal information
- Full name: Neil Patrick Anderson
- Born: 27 February 1979 (age 47); Banbridge, Northern Ireland
- Batting: Right-handed
- Bowling: Slow left-arm orthodox

Domestic team information
- Years: Team
- 1998/99: Northern Ireland

Career statistics
Competition	List A
Matches	1
Runs scored	3
Batting average	3.00
100s/50s	0/0
Top score	3
Catches/stumpings	1/–
- Source: Cricinfo, 2 January 2022

Neil Patrick Anderson (born 27 February 1979) is a Northern Irish cricketer. He is a right-handed batsman and a left-arm spin bowler. He played two matches for Ireland in 1998, against MCC and Bangladesh. He also played one List A match for Northern Ireland as part of the cricket tournament at the 1998 Commonwealth Games.
