= Alan Rutherford =

Irish cricketer (born 1967)

Personal information
- Full name: Alan Thomas Rutherford
- Born: 2 June 1967 (age 59); Strabane, Northern Ireland
- Batting: Right-handed
- Role: Wicket-keeper

Domestic team information
- Years: Team
- 1996–1998: Ireland

Career statistics
Competition	First-class	List A
Matches	4	12
Runs scored	66	88
Batting average	16.50	17.60
100s/50s	0/0	0/0
Top score	26	26
Catches/stumpings	6/1	16/1
- Source: Cricinfo, 19 October 2021

Alan Thomas Rutherford (born 2 June 1967) is a former Northern Irish cricketer. He was a right-handed batsman and a wicket-keeper who was born at Strabane in County Tyrone. He made his debut for Ireland against Northamptonshire in 1989, and went on to play for his country on 47 occasions, including four first-class and nine List A matches.

He played for Ireland at the 1997 ICC Trophy, the 2000 ICC Emerging Nations Tournament in 2000, and at the European Championship in 1996 and 2000. The 2000 European Championship would be his last appearance for Ireland. He also represented Northern Ireland in the cricket tournament at the 1998 Commonwealth Games.
