= Mike Allingham =

Scottish cricketer (born 1965)

Personal information
- Full name: Michael James De Grey Allingham
- Born: 6 January 1965 (age 61); Inverness, Scotland
- Batting: Right-handed
- Bowling: Right-arm medium
- Role: All-rounder

International information
- National side: Scotland
- ODI debut (cap 3): 16 May 1999 v Australia
- Last ODI: 31 May 1999 v New Zealand

Domestic team information
- Years: Team
- 1991–1999: Scotland

Career statistics
Competition	ODI	FC	LA
Matches	3	5	13
Runs scored	11	273	159
Batting average	3.66	45.50	15.90
100s/50s	0/0	0/2	0/1
Top score	6	66	54
Balls bowled	–	210	345
Wickets	–	4	5
Bowling average	–	40.75	58.40
5 wickets in innings	–	0	0
10 wickets in match	–	0	0
Best bowling	–	3/53	2/43
Catches/stumpings	1/0	3/0	2/0
- Source: CricketArchive, 29 October 2013

Rugby union career
Amateur team(s)
Years	Team	Apps	(Points)
-	Heriot's		
Provincial / State sides
Years	Team	Apps	(Points)
-	North and Midlands		
-	Edinburgh District		
International career
Years	Team	Apps	(Points)
1991	Scotland 'B'	1	(0)

Michael James de Grey Allingham (born 6 January 1965) is a former Scotland international cricketer and a former Scotland 'B' international rugby union player. He was born at Inverness in 1965.

== Cricket career ==
Allingham played as a right-handed batsman and a right-arm medium-pace bowler. He was educated at Strathallan School. He played 49 matches for Scotland, including first class, List A, international and ICC Trophy matches.

== Rugby Union career ==
He played as a scrum-half in rugby union for Heriot's. He played provincially for North and Midlands and later played for Edinburgh District. He was capped by the Scotland 'B' side on 28 December 1991 to play against Ireland 'B'.

Allingham retired from rugby following a knee injury.

== Professional career ==
In 2016, he was the head of sport at Edinburgh Academy.
