= 1998 'Friendship' Cup =

1998 Friendship Cup
- Dates: 12 – 20 September 1998
- Administrator: International Cricket Council
- Cricket format: One Day International
- Host: Canada
- Champions: Pakistan
- Participants: 2
- Matches: 5
- Player of the series: (Pakistan) Inzamam-ul-Haq
- Most runs: (Pakistan) Inzamam-ul-Haq (214)
- Most wickets: (India) Javagal Srinath (10)

The 1998 'Friendship Cup' , also known as the 1998 Sahara 'Friendship Cup' for sponsorship reasons, was a One Day International cricket series which took place between 12 and 20 September 1998. The tournament was held in Canada, which was seen as neutral territory for India and Pakistan to play each other. The tournament was won by Pakistan, who won the series 4–1.

== Squads ==
India	Pakistan
Mohammad Azharuddin (c); Ajit Agarkar; Rahul Dravid; Sourav Ganguly; Ajay Jadeja; Sunil Joshi; Hrishikesh Kanitkar; Nayan Mongia (wk); Jatin Paranjpe; Venkatesh Prasad; Sanjay Raul; Navjot Sidhu; Javagal Srinath; Sachin Tendulkar	Aamer Sohail (c); Shahid Afridi; Ijaz Ahmed; Mushtaq Ahmed; Saeed Anwar; Aaqib Javed (vc); Moin Khan (wk); Azhar Mahmood; Saleem Malik; Saqlain Mushtaq; Abdul Razzaq; Inzamam-ul-Haq; Mohammad Yousuf; Mohammad Zahid

A provisional Pakistan squad for the series was announced on 30 August 1998. Saleem Malik was recalled, and Wasim Akram, who had to fulfill playing commitments to his club side Lancashire, and Saqlain Mushtaq, were excluded. Mushtaq was included in the list of three reserve players. The other two were Murtaza Hussain and Fazl-e-Akbar. An injured Younis was later omitted when the final squad was announced a few days later.

India split its squad into two, sending one led by Ajay Jadeja to compete in the 1998 Commonwealth Games. That squad included Sachin Tendulkar, Anil Kumble and VVS Laxman, while the squad that travelled to Canada was led by Mohammad Azharuddin and included other first team players such as Sourav Ganguly, Rahul Dravid, Javagal Srinath and Venkatesh Prasad. Two members of the team that played at the Commonwealth Games were sent to Canada after they failed to progress past the group stages at the Games. Jadeja came into the side for the fourth match of the series when his team was trailing 1–2, and Tendulkar for the fifth and final match.

== Fixtures ==
=== ODI series ===
==== 1st ODI ====
12 September
10:10
Scorecard

Pakistan; 189/9 (50 overs)	v	India; 193/4 (43.4 overs)
Saleem Malik 41 (74); Sourav Ganguly 3/33 (10 overs)		Sourav Ganguly 54 (72); Mohammad Zahid 1/38 (10 overs)

India won by 6 wickets
Toronto Cricket, Skating and Curling Club, Toronto
Umpires: Steve Dunne (NZ) and Ian Robinson (Zim)
Player of the match: Sourav Ganguly (Ind)

- India won the toss and elected to field.
- Match start was delayed by 40 minutes due to wet outfield.

==== 2nd ODI ====
13 September
Scorecard

Pakistan; 246/9 (50 overs)	v	India; 195 (46.3 overs)
Moin Khan 69 (83); Hrishikesh Kanitkar 2/22 (6 overs)		Nayan Mongia 41 (58); Saleem Malik 4/36 (6.3 overs)

Pakistan won by 51 runs
Toronto Cricket, Skating and Curling Club, Toronto
Umpires: Peter Manuel (SL) and Ian Robinson (Zim)
Player of the match: Moin Khan (Pak)

- India won the toss and elected to field.
- Sanjay Raul (Ind) made his ODI debut.

==== 3rd ODI ====
16 September
Scorecard

Pakistan; 257/5 (50 overs)	v	India; 180 (46.2 overs)
Inzamam-ul-Haq 81 (112); Ajit Agarkar 2/59 (10 overs)		Javagal Srinath 43 (40); Mohammad Zahid 2/20 (6.2 overs)

Pakistan won by 77 runs
Toronto Cricket, Skating and Curling Club, Toronto
Umpires: Steve Dunne (NZ) and Peter Manuel (SL)
Player of the match: Inzamam-ul-Haq (Pak)

- India won the toss and elected to field.

==== 4th ODI ====
19 September
Scorecard

Pakistan; 316/6 (50 overs)	v	India; 182 (46.3 overs)
Shahid Afridi 109 (94); Sunil Joshi 2/36 (10 overs)		Navjot Sidhu 62 (78); Saqlain Mushtaq 3/20 (9 overs)

Pakistan won by 134 runs
Toronto Cricket, Skating and Curling Club, Toronto
Umpires: Steve Dunne (NZ) and Ian Robinson (Zim)
Player of the match: Shahid Afridi (Pak)

- India won the toss and elected to field.
- Saleem Malik (Pak) passed 7,000 runs in ODIs.

==== 5th ODI ====
20 September
Scorecard

India; 256/9 (50 overs)	v	Pakistan; 258/5 (48.2 overs)
Mohammad Azharuddin 101 (111); Saqlain Mushtaq 4/67 (10 overs)		Aamer Sohail 97* (125); Javagal Srinath 3/50 (10 overs)

Pakistan won by 5 wickets
Toronto Cricket, Skating and Curling Club, Toronto
Umpires: Steve Dunne (NZ) and Peter Manuel (SL)
Player of the match: Aamer Sohail (Pak)

- India won the toss and elected to bat.
- Match start was delayed by 15 minutes due to wet outfield.

== Statistics ==
Most runs		Most wickets	
(Pakistan) Inzamam-ul-Haq	214	(India) Javagal Srinath	10
(Pakistan) Saeed Anwar	207	(Pakistan) Saqlain Mushtaq	8
(Pakistan) Aamer Sohail	201	(India) Ajit Agarkar	8
(India) Mohammad Azharuddin	195	(Pakistan) Saleem Malik	6
(Pakistan) Shahid Afridi	183	(Pakistan) Aamer Sohail	5
