= Siswanto Haidi =

Malaysian cricketer (born 1972)

Personal information
- Full name: Siswanto Bin Moksun Haidi
- Born: 22 February 1972 (age 54); Tawau, Sabah, Malaysia
- Batting: Right-handed
- Bowling: Right-arm fast-medium

Career statistics
Competition	List A
Matches	4
Runs scored	0
Batting average	0.00
100s/50s	0/0
Top score	0
Balls bowled	96
Wickets	0
Bowling average	–
5 wickets in innings	–
10 wickets in match	–
Best bowling	–
Catches/stumpings	1/–
- Source: CricketArchive, 18 January 2008

Siswanto Bin Moksun Haidi (born 22 February 1972) is a Malaysian cricketer. A right-handed batsman and right-arm fast-medium bowler, he played for the Malaysia national cricket team in 1998.

== Biography ==
Born in Tawau in 1972, Siswanto Haidi first played for Malaysia in 1998, playing against Pakistan International Airlines in the Wills Cup, a Pakistani domestic one-day tournament. He also played against Lahore City in the tournament, and played in the Saudara Cup match against Singapore in August.

In September, he represented Malaysia in the cricket tournament at the 1998 Commonwealth Games, hosted in Kuala Lumpur, playing against Zimbabwe and Jamaica. These were his final List A matches, ending his List A career with no runs and no wickets. His last appearance for Malaysia was in the ACC Trophy in Nepal in October.
