= Kelab Aman =

Cricket ground in Kuala Lumpur, Malaysia

Coordinates: 03°09′43.77″N 101°43′26.59″E

- Location: Jalan Ampang, Kuala Lumpur, Malaysia
- Establishment: 1995 (first recorded match)
- Capacity: 1,000-2,000
- As of 7 October 2011; Source: Ground profile

Kelab Aman is a cricket ground near Jalan Ampang in Kuala Lumpur, Malaysia. The first recorded match on the ground came in 1995 when Malaysia played Thailand in the Tuanku Ja'afar Cup.

In 1997, the ground held ten matches in the ICC Trophy. The following year it held five List A matches as part of the cricket competition at the 1998 Commonwealth Games. These matches saw Malaysia play Sri Lanka, Northern Ireland play South Africa, Malaysia play Zimbabwe, New Zealand play Scotland, and Barbados play South Africa.
