= Rubber Research Institute Ground =

Cricket ground in Selangor, Malaysia

Coordinates: 03°09′40.28″N 101°33′26.88″E

- Location: Shah Alam, Selangor, Malaysia
- Establishment: 1993 (first recorded match)
- Capacity: 6,000
- As of 7 October 2011; Source: Ground profile

Rubber Research Institute Ground is a cricket ground in located in Shah Alam, Selangor, Malaysia. The first recorded match held on the ground came in 1993 when Malaysia played Singapore in the Saudara Cup.

In 1997, the ground held ten matches in the ICC Trophy. The following year it held three List A matches as part of the cricket competition at the 1998 Commonwealth Games. These matches saw Kenya play Pakistan, Barbados play Northern Ireland, and Kenya play Scotland.
