= Matthew Phelps =

Australian cricketer (born 1972)

Matthew James Phelps (born 1 September 1972 in Lismore, New South Wales) is an Australian first-class cricketer who played for the New South Wales Blues. He was a right-handed middle order batsman.

Matthew Phelps' career began in 1998-99 and ended in 2006 when he retired aged 33 after a career best domestic season where he was named NSW Pura Cup Player of the Year. He scored 635 runs at 45.35 with 3 centuries. It was the second season in a row that he had scored over 600 runs. Of his 6 first-class tons in his career he was able to score one in his home town of Lismore, an innings of 133 against Victoria. He finished his career with 2380 first-class runs at 37.77 from 38 matches. His highest score was 192 which came against Tasmania in 1999–2000.

== See also ==
- List of New South Wales representative cricketers
