= Kirk Powell =

Jamaican cricketer (born 1972)

Kirk Powell (born 17 June 1972 in Jamaica) was a Jamaican cricket player. He was a right-handed batsman and right-arm fast-medium bowler. He played four first-class and 11 List A matches for Jamaica between 1999 and 1998. He later played for the Middlesex Cricket Board in 2001 and 2002 in their matches in the C&G Trophy.
