= Edward Mboya =

Kenyan cricketer

Personal information
- Full name: Edward Mboya
- Born: 5 June 1982 (age 44); Nairobi, Kenya
- Batting: Unknown

Career statistics
Competition	List A
Matches	2
Runs scored	5
Batting average	2.50
100s/50s	–/–
Top score	5
Catches/stumpings	2/–
- Source: Cricinfo, 21 September 2021

Edward Mboya (born 5 June 1982) is a Kenyan former cricketer.

Mboya was part of the Kenya under-19 squad for the 1998 Under-19 Cricket World Cup in South Africa, making six Youth One Day International appearances during the tournament. Later that same year he was part of the Kenya squad for the Commonwealth Games in Malaysia, making two List A appearances against Pakistan and Scotland. He scored 5 runs against Pakistan and was dismissed without scoring against Scotland. Mboya did not feature again for Kenya following the Commonwealth Games.
