= Jeevandran Nair =

Malaysian cricketer

Personal information
- Full name: S Jeevandran Nair
- Born: 18 March 1974 (age 52); Port Dickson, Negeri Sembilan, Malaysia
- Batting: Right-handed
- Bowling: Off spin
- Role: Bowler

Career statistics
Competition	List A	ICC Trophy
Matches	5	7
Runs scored	31	44
Batting average	7.75	7.33
100s/50s	0/0	0/0
Top score	23*	16
Balls bowled	84	284
Wickets	4	6
Bowling average	29.00	22.50
5 wickets in innings	0	0
10 wickets in match	0	0
Best bowling	3/53	4/22
Catches/stumpings	2/–	2/–
- Source: CricketArchive, 18 January 2008

S Jeevandran Nair (born 18 March 1974) is a Malaysian cricketer. A right-handed batsman and off spin bowler, he played for the Malaysia national cricket team between 1996 and 2002.

== Biography ==
Born in Port Dickson in 1974, Jeevandran Nair first played for Malaysia in one match of the 1996 Stan Nagaiah Trophy series against Singapore, also playing in that year's Saudara Cup match. In 1997, after playing all three matches of the Stan Nagaiah Trophy series, he played in the 1997 ICC Trophy, hosted in Kuala Lumpur.

He made his List A debut in March 1998, after playing in that year's Stan Nagaiah Trophy series, playing three matches in the Wills Cup, a Pakistani domestic one-day competition. He played in his second, and final, Saudara Cup match in August before representing Malaysia in the cricket tournament at the 1998 Commonwealth Games, hosted in Kuala Lumpur, where he played against Sri Lanka and Zimbabwe.

Following the Commonwealth Games he played in the 1998 ACC Trophy in Nepal, before spending almost four years out of the Malaysian national side. He returned for the 2002 ACC Trophy in Singapore, which is his last appearance for Malaysia to date.
