= Tony Powell (cricketer) =

Jamaican cricketer (born 1972)

Personal information
- Full name: Tony Orlando Powell
- Born: 22 December 1972 (age 53); Saint Catherine, Jamaica
- Batting: Left-handed
- Bowling: Right-arm medium pace

Domestic team information
- Years: Team
- 1991–2000: Jamaica

Career statistics
Competition	First-class	List A
Matches	42	38
Runs scored	2,062	685
Batting average	30.32	22.83
100s/50s	3/13	0/3
Top score	125*	76
Catches/stumpings	52/–	13/–
- Source: CricketArchive, 17 January 2011

Tony Orlando Powell (born 22 December 1972 in St Catherine, Jamaica) was a Jamaican cricketer.

He played 42 first class and 38 List A matches as a left-handed batsman and a right-arm medium fast bowler. He played mainly for Jamaica, between 1992 and 2000. He also represented Jamaica in the cricket tournament at the 1998 Commonwealth Games.
