= Ryan Eagleson =

Irish cricketer (born 1974)

Cricket information
- Batting: Right-handed
- Bowling: Right-arm fast-medium

International information
- National side: Ireland

Career statistics
Competition	First-class	List A
Matches	2	21
Runs scored	91	96
Batting average	91.00	8.72
100s/50s	0/1	0/0
Top score	50*	15*
Balls bowled	252	1019
Wickets	4	25
Bowling average	45.75	38.12
5 wickets in innings	0	0
10 wickets in match	0	0
Best bowling	2/50	4/59
Catches/stumpings	3/–	6/–
- Source: CricketArchive, 12 October 2022

Ryan Logan Eagleson (born 17 December 1974) is a former Northern Irish cricketer.

A right-handed batsman and right-arm fast-medium bowler, Ryan Eagleson made his debut for the Ireland cricket team against the Duchess of Norfolk's XI at Arundel Castle in June 1995 and went on to play for them on 65 occasions in all, his last match coming against the West Indies in June 2004.

Of his matches for Ireland, one had first-class status and 16 had List A status. In all matches for Ireland, he scored 380 runs at an average of 13.10, his top score (and only half century) being an innings of 50 not out against Scotland in August 1996. He took 70 wickets at an average of 33.66, with best bowling figures of 4/59 against Leicestershire in June 1999.

Ryan Eagleson represented Ireland in several international tournaments; the ICC Trophy in 1997 and 2001 and the European Championship in 1996 and 1998. He also represented Northern Ireland in the cricket tournament at the 1998 Commonwealth Games.

He also played county cricket for Derbyshire, playing for them in one first-class and two List A matches in 1999. He also played second XI cricket for Derbyshire, Essex and Glamorgan between 1996 and 1999. He also represented Hong Kong at the Hong Kong Sixes in November 2004. He continued to play for Carrickfergus Cricket Club in the Northern Cricket Union Premier League until 2021, when he was appointed as the Ireland bowling coach.
