= Keith Sheridan =

Scottish cricketer (born 1971)

Keith Sheridan (born 26 March 1971 in Glasgow) is a Scottish cricketer. He is a right-handed batsman and a left-arm slow bowler. He has the distinction of being one of the youngest ever players for the Scottish cricket team. He has played 82 times for Scotland, including four first-class and nine List A matches. He was not selected for the Scotland squad at the 1999 Cricket World Cup, but did play for them in the cricket tournament at the 1998 Commonwealth Games.

His best bowling performance is 5 for 48 which he achieved in 1992 in Johannesburg. Though he is an opening batsman for his club side, he has a low batting average for the national side and is generally asked to bat as a tailender. Sheridan appeared in the ICC Trophy between 1997 and 2001.

As of 2016, he was working as a civil engineer.
