= Syed Mahabubullah =

Bangladeshi cricket umpire (born 1958)

Personal information
- Born: 15 June 1958 (age 68); Dhaka, Bangladesh

Umpiring information
- ODIs umpired: 1 (2002)
- Source: Cricinfo, 25 May 2014

Syed Mahabubullah (born 15 June 1958) is a Bangladeshi former cricket umpire. He has mainly umpired in first-class cricket matches domestically. He stood in one ODI game in 2002.

== See also ==
- List of One Day International cricket umpires
