= Azam Iqbal =

Bangladeshi cricketer (born 1973)

Personal information
- Born: 2 February 1973 (age 53); Chittagong, Chittagong Division, Bangladesh
- Batting: Right-handed
- Bowling: Right-arm off break
- Role: Occasional wicket-keeper

International information
- National side: Bangladesh

Domestic team information
- Years: Team
- 2000/01–2004/05: Chittagong Division

Career statistics
Competition	First-class	List A
Matches	35	39
Runs scored	1,275	843
Batting average	29.65	24.79
100s/50s	1/10	1/4
Top score	130*	123*
Balls bowled	174	96
Wickets	1	4
Bowling average	80.00	20.75
5 wickets in innings	0	0
10 wickets in match	0	0
Best bowling	1/1	3/38
Catches/stumpings	24/–	14/–
- Source: CricketArchive, 17 January 2011

Azam Iqbal (born 2 February 1973) is a Bangladeshi cricketer. He has played 35 first-class and 36 List A matches for the Chittagong Division in Bangladeshi domestic cricket. While he has not played Test cricket or One Day Internationals for the Bangladesh, he did represent them at the 1998 Commonwealth Games.
