= Gordon Cooke =

Irish cricketer (born 1975)

Cricket information
- Batting: Right-handed
- Bowling: Right-arm medium-fast

Career statistics
Competition	First-class	List A
Matches	5	21
Runs scored	39	148
Batting average	9.75	18.50
100s/50s	0/0	0/0
Top score	17	38*
Balls bowled	588	1,049
Wickets	8	25
Bowling average	42.00	35.80
5 wickets in innings	0	1
10 wickets in match	0	0
Best bowling	2/49	5/35
Catches/stumpings	2/–	4/–
- Source: CricketArchive, 30 December 2021

Gordon Cooke (born 24 July 1975) is a former Northern Irish cricketer, from Derry. A right-handed batsman and right-arm medium-fast bowler, he played 66 times for the Irish cricket team between 1994 and 2005.

He made his debut for Ireland on 11 June 1994, playing against Scotland in a first-class match. He played for Ireland in five more matches that year, and two matches in 1995 before being absent from the Irish team for two years. He returned to the team in May 1997 and remained an almost constant presence in the side until the European Championship in 2000, which was to be his last game for Ireland until 2004, when he returned in that year's European Championship tournament. His last games for Ireland came in the 2005 ICC Trophy, playing in the final as Ireland lost to Scotland. He has now retired from cricket.

Of his 66 matches for Ireland, five had first-class status and 18 had List A status. His other three List A matches were for Northern Ireland as part of the cricket tournament at the 1998 Commonwealth Games.
