= Craig Evans (Zimbabwean sportsman) =

Zimbabwean cricketer (born 1969)

Personal information
- Full name: Craig Neil Evans
- Born: 29 November 1969 (age 56); Harare, Zimbabwe
- Batting: Right-handed
- Bowling: Right-arm medium
- Relatives: Brad Evans (son)

International information
- National side: Zimbabwe (1992–2003)
- Test debut: 11 September 1996 v Sri Lanka
- Last Test: 9 October 2003 v Australia
- ODI debut: 25 October 1992 v India
- Last ODI: 1 December 2002 v Pakistan

Career statistics
Competition	Test	ODI
Matches	3	53
Runs scored	52	764
Batting average	8.66	18.19
100s/50s	0/0	0/2
Top score	22	96*
Balls bowled	54	964
Wickets	0	21
Bowling average	–	40.38
5 wickets in innings	–	0
10 wickets in match	–	0
Best bowling	–	3/11
Catches/stumpings	1/–	12/–
- Source: CricInfo, 11 February 2006

Craig Neil Evans (born 29 November 1969) is a Zimbabwean cricketer.

== Cricket ==
Evans played in three Tests, against Sri Lanka, India and Australia, but was considered as a specialist at the one-day game. He appeared in the 1996 Cricket World Cup, with his highest international score 96 not out against Sri Lanka at SSC, Colombo in the Singer World Series in 1996.

In February 2020, he was named in Zimbabwe's squad for the Over-50s Cricket World Cup in South Africa. However, the tournament was cancelled during the third round of matches due to the coronavirus pandemic.

== See also ==
- Rugby union in Zimbabwe
