= O'Neil Richards =

Jamaican cricketer (born 1976)

O'Neil Richards (born 7 December 1976 in Jamaica) is a Jamaican cricketer. He is a right-handed batsman and right-arm fast-medium bowler. He played five first-class and three List A matches for Jamaica between 1996 and 1999. He never represented the West Indies at senior international level, but did play for them at Under-19 level, and for Jamaica in the 1998 Commonwealth Games.
