= Perbadanan Kemajuan Negeri Selangor Sports Complex =

Sports facility in Kelana Jaya, Malaysia

Coordinates: 03°05′38.09″N 101°36′05.20″E

PKNS Sports Complex
- Interactive map of PKNS Sports Complex
- Location: Kelana Jaya, Petaling Jaya, Selangor, Malaysia
- Country: Malaysia
- Establishment: 1991 (first recorded match)
- Capacity: At least 7,532
- As of 7 October 2011; Source: Ground profile

Perbadanan Kemajuan Negeri Selangor Sports Complex (erroneously referred as Perbadanan Kemajuan Negari Selangor by cricket records) or PKNS Sports Complex (Malay: Kompleks Sukan PKNS) is a multi-purpose sports facility at SS7, Kelana Jaya, Petaling Jaya, Selangor which is used for cricket and football. Owned by the Selangor State Development Corporation, it is located near MBPJ Stadium.

== History ==
Its first recorded use for cricket purposes came in 1991 when the ground hosted a match between Malaysia and Singapore in the Saudara Cup.

In 1997, the ground held ten matches in the ICC Trophy. The following year it held its first List A match when Australia played Canada as part of the cricket competition at the 1998 Commonwealth Games.Six further List A matches were played there during the games, the last of which saw the final played between Australia and South Africa. This match also saw the highest recorded attendance for a cricket match in Malaysia, with 7,532 witnessing a South African victory.

As of 2012, the land where the complex is based was planned to be used for commercial development.

== See also ==
- Sport in Malaysia
