= Bruce Patterson (cricketer) =

Scottish cricketer (born 1965)

Personal information
- Born: 29 January 1965 (age 61); Ayr, Scotland
- Batting: Right-handed

Career statistics
Competition	ODI
Matches	3
Runs scored	10
Batting average	3.33
100s/50s	0/0
Top score	10
Catches/stumpings	0/–
- Source: Cricinfo, 19 April 2007

Bruce Patterson (born 29 January 1965) is a Scottish former cricketer. He took his first two wickets in a competition in June 2004 against Holland. He played in three One Day Internationals in May 1999 and played List A cricket from 1988 to 2002. He also played in the 2001 ICC Trophy.

He hit Damien Fleming for four off the first ball of the match against Australia in 1999.

He has now retired from all forms of cricket and runs an estate agency in Ayr.
