= Scott Thompson (cricketer) =

Australian cricketer (born 1972)

Scott Michael Thompson (born 4 May 1972) is a former Australian cricketer who played for New South Wales.

Thompson played Sydney Grade Cricket for Bankstown, making 8957 runs and taking 676 wickets. He also played for St George for three years.

== See also ==
- List of New South Wales representative cricketers
