= Santhara Vello =

Malaysian cricketer (born 1972)

Personal information
- Full name: Santhara Segeran Vello
- Born: 19 May 1972 (age 54); Ipoh, Perak, Malaysia
- Batting: Right-handed

Career statistics
Competition	List A	ICC Trophy
Matches	5	10
Runs scored	42	158
Batting average	8.40	15.80
100s/50s	0/0	0/0
Top score	42	41
Catches/stumpings	0/–	1/–
- Source: CricketArchive, 19 January 2008

Santhara Segeran Vello (born 19 May 1972) is a Malaysian cricketer. A right-handed batsman, he played for the Malaysia national cricket team between 1994 and 1998.

== Biography ==
Born in Ipoh in 1972, Santhara Vello first played for Malaysia in the 1994 ICC Trophy in Nairobi, playing three games in the tournament. He next played in the 1997 ICC Trophy in Kuala Lumpur.

He made his List A debut in 1998, playing for Malaysia in the Wills Cup, a Pakistani domestic one-day competition. Later in the year he represented Malaysia in the cricket tournament at the 1998 Commonwealth Games, hosted in Kuala Lumpur. He played two matches in the tournament, against Sri Lanka and Zimbabwe. He has not played for Malaysia since.
