= Dekker Curry =

Irish cricketer

Personal information
- Full name: John Desmond Curry
- Born: 20 December 1966 (age 59); Strabane, County Tyrone, Northern Ireland
- Batting: Left-handed
- Bowling: Right-arm off-break
- Role: Bowler
- Relatives: Christopher Dougherty (nephew)

International information
- National side: Ireland

Career statistics
Competition	First-class	List A
Matches	2	11
Runs scored	54	141
Batting average	13.50	14.10
100s/50s	0/0	0/1
Top score	41	75
Balls bowled	60	204
Wickets	1	4
Bowling average	16.00	36.25
5 wickets in innings	0	0
10 wickets in match	0	0
Best bowling	1/12	2/42
Catches/stumpings	0/0	3/0
- Source: CricketArchive, 2 May 2016

John Desmond "Dekker" Curry (born 20 December 1966) is a Northern Irish former cricketer. A left-handed batsman and right-arm off-break bowler, he made his debut for the Ireland cricket team against an England Amateur team in July 1992, and went on to represent Ireland on 50 occasions, his last game coming against Scotland in the 2001 ICC Trophy.

Of his matches for Ireland, two were first-class matches against Scotland and eight had List A status. In all matches for Ireland, he scored 1193 runs, his top score (and only century) coming against the Earl of Arundel's XI in June 2001, when he scored exactly 100. He also took 33 wickets, his best bowling being 3/28 against the USA in the 1997 ICC Trophy.

He was man of the match in Ireland's famous win over Middlesex in the 1997 Benson & Hedges Cup.

He represented Ireland in the ICC Trophy in 1994, 1997 and 2001, and at the 1996 European Championship. He also represented Northern Ireland in the cricket tournament at the 1998 Commonwealth Games.
