= Tenaga National Sports Complex =

Cricket ground in Kuala Lumpur, Malaysia

Coordinates: 3.11768°N 101.6693899°E

- Kilat Kelab Club

Ground information
- Location: Kuala Lumpur, Malaysia
- Country: Malaysia
- Establishment: 1966
- Capacity: 3,000
- Operator: Kilat Kelab Club
- Tenants: Malaysia national cricket team
- End names
- City End, Pavilion End

Team information
Malaysia cricket team	(1966-present)
- As of August 15, 2015; Source: Ground profile

The Tenaga National Sports Complex (Malay: Kompleks Sukan Tenaga Nasional) is a cricket grounds in Kuala Lumpur, Malaysia. The ground was renamed as the Tenaga Sports Ground in February 1997 and was formerly known as Kilat Kelab Club (Kilat means 'lightning' in English).

The Venue has the capacity to hold several thousand people but there is no permanent seating facilities in the ground but tents are positioned around the boundary. The ground has turf wickets.

The venue hosted the international Super 8's in July 1996. The ground was also used for the final, between Kenya and Bangladesh in the 1997 ICC Trophy.
