= National Cricket Performance Centre =

Cricket venue in Loughborough, England

The National Academy at Loughborough University

The National Cricket Performance Centre first came into existence in the winter of 2001–2002 and has been based at Loughborough University since 2003. In 2007 following the "Schofield Report" the National Academy was renamed the National Cricket Performance Centre. It consists of an indoor training complex. Facilities include lanes enabling full runups for fast bowlers and wicket-keepers stood back, Hawk-Eye cameras and advanced biomechanics analysis equipment. In addition to the indoor complex the academy also provides outdoor training facilities.

The National Academy is integrated with the England Lions cricket team, with touring parties being taken from the academy squad.

== National Cricket Performance Centre staff ==
- Performance Director: David Parsons
- ECB Performance Manager: David Graveney
- ECB Elite Player Development Manager: John Abraham
- National Cricket Performance Centre Manager: Dr. Guy Jackson
- ECB Batting Programme Lead: Graham Thorpe
- ECB Fast-Bowling Programme Lead: Kevin Shine
- ECB Spin-Bowling Programme Lead: Peter Such
- ECB Fielding Programme Lead: Richard Halsall
- ECB Wicket-Keeping Programme Lead: Bruce French (Acting)
- Physiologist: Richard Smith
- National Lead Physiotherapist: Ben Langley
- Information & Resource Manager: David Rose
- Administrator: Jo Pearson

== National Academy player intake ==
Each year the best up and coming cricket talent from around Britain are invited to train with the National Academy, originally under the tutelage of Head Coach Rod Marsh and now under that of Director David Parsons. These young players are those that have been earmarked as possible players in future England cricket teams and it is for this reason that the National Academy was set up.
