= Stan Nagaiah Trophy =

Annual series of one-day cricket matches played between Malaysia & Singapore

The Stan Nagaiah Trophy is an annual series of one-day cricket matches played between Malaysia and Singapore. It has been played annually since 1995, and is named in honour of Stan Nagaiah, a cricketer from Singapore in the 1950s who also often represented All-Malaya. In 2016, a Twenty20 match was played as part of the series for the first time.

== Results ==
Year	Result
1995	Singapore win series 2-1
1996	Malaysia win series 2-1
1997	Malaysia win series 3-0
1998	Singapore win series 2-1
1999	Malaysia win series 2-1
2000	Malaysia win series 2-0 (1 no result)
2001	Malaysia win series 2-1
2002	Singapore win series 3-0
2003	Malaysia win series 2-1
2004	Malaysia win series 3-0
2005	Singapore win series 2-0 (1 no result)
2006	Series tied 1-1 (1 no result)
2007	Not Played
2008	Singapore win series 3-0
2009	Malaysia win series 2-1
2010	Singapore win series 2-1
2011	Malaysia win series 2-0 (1 no result)
2012	Malaysia win series 2-1
2013	Malaysia win series 2-1
2014	Malaysia win series 2-1
2015	Not Played
2016	Malaysia win series 3-0
2017	Not Played
2018	Singapore win series 2-1
2022	Malaysia win series 2-1

== Records ==
=== 50 overs ===
- Highest team score: 304-5 by Malaysia in 2014
- Lowest team score: 80 by Singapore in 1999
- Highest individual score: 124 by Zubin Shroff for Singapore in 1999 and by Rakesh Madhavan for Malaysia in 1999
- Best innings bowling: 5/13 by Jeevandran Nair for Malaysia in 1997

=== 20 overs ===
- Highest team score: 219-4 by Malaysia in 2016
- Lowest team score: 136-6 by Singapore in 2016
- Highest individual score: 109* by Ahmed Faiz for Malaysia in 2016
- Best innings bowling: 4/18 by Derek Duraisingam for Malaysia in 2016
