= Saudara Cup =

Annual cricket match played between Singapore and Malaysia

The Saudara Cup is an annual cricket match played between Malaysia and Singapore. It has been played since 1970, with the exception of 2013, when it was not held, and 2014, when the match was abandoned without a ball being bowled. Malaysia have won the Cup 13 times and Singapore nine times. The other matches have all been drawn. The name of the tournament comes from the Malay word for "close relation".

== Results ==
Year	Venue	Result	Cup Holder	Notes
1970	Kuala Lumpur	Draw	Shared	Scorecard
1971	Padang	Malaysia won by an innings and 76 runs	Malaysia	Scorecard, Malaysia's innings of 394 and Gurucharan Singh's innings of 152 are the highest ever in the history of the match
1972	Kuala Lumpur	Draw	Malaysia	Scorecard
1973	Padang	Draw	Malaysia	Scorecard
1974	Padang	Draw	Malaysia	Scorecard
1975	Kuala Lumpur	Draw	Malaysia	Scorecard
1976	Padang	Draw	Malaysia	Scorecard
1977	Kuala Lumpur	Singapore won by 151 runs	Singapore	Scorecard
1978	Padang	Drawn	Singapore	Scorecard
1979	Kuala Lumpur	Singapore won by an innings and 80 runs	Singapore	Scorecard
1980	Padang	Singapore won by 107 runs	Singapore	Scorecard
1981	Kuala Lumpur	Drawn	Singapore	Scorecard
1982	Padang	Malaysia won by 1 wicket	Malaysia	Scorecard
1983	Kuala Lumpur	Malaysia won by 10 wickets	Malaysia	Scorecard, K Saker takes all ten wickets in the Singapore first innings, the best bowling performance in the history of the match.
1984	Padang	Malaysia won by 3 wickets	Malaysia	Scorecard
1985	Kuala Lumpur	Malaysia won by 8 wickets	Malaysia	Scorecard
1986	Padang	Malaysia won by 127 runs	Malaysia	Scorecard
1987	Johor Bahru	Drawn	Malaysia	Scorecard
1988	Padang	Singapore won by 51 runs	Singapore	Scorecard
1989	Kuala Lumpur	Drawn	Singapore	Scorecard
1990	Ceylon Sports Club, Singapore	Drawn	Singapore	Scorecard
1991	Kuala Lumpur	Malaysia won by 132 runs	Malaysia	Scorecard
1992	Ceylon Sports Club	Singapore won by 5 wickets	Singapore	Scorecard
1993	Kuala Lumpur	Malaysia won by 7 wickets	Malaysia	Scorecard
1994	Padang	Drawn	Malaysia	Scorecard
1995	Penang Sports Club	Malaysia won by 7 wickets	Malaysia	Scorecard
1996	Padang	Drawn	Malaysia	Scorecard
1997	Penang Sports Club	Drawn	Malaysia	Scorecard
1998	Kallang	Drawn	Malaysia	Scorecard
1999	Kuala Lumpur	Malaysia won by 116 runs	Malaysia	Scorecard, Arul Suppiah takes the only hat-trick in the history of the match.
2000	Kallang	Malaysia won by 3 wickets	Malaysia	Scorecard
2001	Kuala Lumpur	Drawn	Malaysia	Scorecard
2002	Kallang	Singapore won by 10 wickets	Singapore	Scorecard
2003	Kuala Lumpur	Singapore won by 7 wickets	Singapore	Scorecard
2004	Indian Association Ground, Singapore	Malaysia won by 3 wickets	Malaysia	Scorecard
2005	Johor Bahru	Drawn	Malaysia	Scorecard
2006	Kallang	Drawn	Malaysia	Scorecard
2007	Kuala Lumpur	Singapore won by 27 runs	Singapore	Scorecard, 17-year-old wicket-keeper Shafiq Sharif makes seven dismissals in the Singapore second innings, a record for the match.
2008	Kallang	Drawn	Singapore	Report
2009	Johor Bahru	Drawn	Singapore	Report
2010	Johor Bahru	Malaysia won by 2 wickets	Malaysia	
2011	Kuala Lumpur	Drawn	Malaysia	Report
2012	Kallang	Drawn	Malaysia	Report
2013	Kuala Lumpur	Not held	Malaysia	Report
2014	Kallang	Abandoned	Malaysia	Report No play possible due to bad weather
2015	Johor Bahru	Singapore won by 5 wickets	Singapore	Scorecard
2016	Johor Bahru	Singapore won by 81 runs	Singapore	Scorecard
2017-19		Not held	Singapore	

== Other meetings ==
Singapore and Malaysia also meet annually in the Stan Nagaiah Trophy, a series of one-day matches, and along with Hong Kong and Thailand contested the Tuanku Ja'afar Cup between 1991 and 2004. They have also met in global and regional tournaments such as the ICC Trophy, ACC Trophy and ACC Fast Track Countries Tournament.
