= 1997–98 Red Stripe Bowl =

Cricket tournament

- Dates: 4 – 20 October 1997
- Administrator: WICB
- Cricket format: List A (50 overs)
- Tournament format(s): Group stage, finals
- Champions: Leeward Islands (6th title)
- Participants: 8
- Matches: 19
- Most runs: (Nevis) Keith Arthurton (408)
- Most wickets: (Antigua and Barbuda) Kenny Benjamin (11)

The 1997–98 Red Stripe Bowl was the 24th edition of what is now the Regional Super50, the domestic limited-overs cricket competition for the countries of the West Indies Cricket Board (WICB). It ran from 4 to 20 October 1997, and was the first edition to bear that name.

Eight teams contested the competition – the six regular teams of West Indian domestic cricket (Barbados, Guyana, Jamaica, the Leeward Islands, Trinidad and Tobago, and the Windward Islands), plus two invited international teams from the ICC Americas region (Bermuda and Canada). All matches at the tournament were played either in Guyana or Jamaica, with the semi-finals and final played in the latter, in Discovery Bay. The Leeward Islands eventually defeated Guyana in the final to win their sixth domestic one-day title (and fourth in six seasons). Two Leeward Islands players, Keith Arthurton and Kenny Benjamin, led the tournament in runs and wickets, respectively.

== Squads ==
Barbados	Bermuda	Canada	Guyana
Philo Wallace (c); Ian Bradshaw; Sherwin Campbell; Pedro Collins; Ottis Gibson; Adrian Griffith; Roland Holder; Ricky Hoyte; Dave Marshall; Winston Reid; Floyd Reifer; Hendy Springer; Patterson Thompson; Joseph Williams	Arnold Manders (c); Anthony Amory; Herbert Bascombe; Dexter Basden; Roger Blades; Lionel Cann; Gregg Foggo; Delano Hollis; Donald Norford; Irving Romaine; Cleon Scotland; Clay Smith; Albert Steede; Janeiro Tucker	Ingleton Liburd (c); Varadarajan Anand; George Codrington; Muneeb Diwan; Derick Etwaroo; Alex Glegg; Joseph Harris; Davis Joseph; Roger Pittiman; Paul Prashad; Sukhjinder Rana; Shiv Seeram; Nadeem Sheikh; Sanjayan Thuraisingam	Carl Hooper (c); Shivnarine Chanderpaul; Kevin Darlington; Andrew Gonsalves; Reon King; Clayton Lambert; Neil McGarrell; Mahendra Nagamootoo; Vishal Nagamootoo; Andre Percival; Ramnaresh Sarwan; Keith Semple
Jamaica	Leeward Islands	Trinidad and Tobago	Windward Islands
Courtney Walsh (c); Jimmy Adams; Shane Ford; Leon Garrick; Wavell Hinds; Delroy Morgan; Patrick Patterson; Nehemiah Perry; Tony Powell; Franklyn Rose; Robert Samuels; Laurie Williams	Stuart Williams (c); Alex Adams; Curtly Ambrose; Keith Arthurton; Kenny Benjamin; Lanville Harrigan; Ridley Jacobs; Dave Joseph; Sylvester Joseph; Runako Morton; Ronald Powell; Kenneth Quinn; Carl Tuckett; Earl Waldron	Brian Lara (c); Ian Bishop; Rajindra Dhanraj; Merv Dillon; Nigel Francis; Daren Ganga; Kenneth Hazel; Suruj Ragoonath; Dinanath Ramnarine; Lincoln Roberts; Phil Simmons; Richard Smith; David Williams	Rawl Lewis (c); Ian Allen; Alton Crafton; Casper Davis; Dawnley Joseph; Roy Marshall; Kenroy Martin; Nixon McLean; McNeil Morgan; Wayne Phillip; John Sylvester; Balty Watt

== Group stage ==
=== Zone A ===
Team	Pld	W	L	T	NR	Pts	NRR
Jamaica	3	2	0	0	1	5	+1.445
Trinidad and Tobago	3	2	1	0	0	4	+1.203
Windward Islands	3	1	1	0	1	3	+0.924
Bermuda	3	0	3	0	0	0	–3.209

4 October 1997
Scorecard

Windward Islands; 215/9 (50 overs)	v	Jamaica; 72/5 (15 overs)

No result
Melbourne Park, Kingston
Player of the match: Dawnley Joseph (Win)

4 October 1997
Scorecard

Trinidad and Tobago; 300/5 (50 overs)	v	Bermuda; 116 (43.3 overs)

Trinidad and Tobago won by 184 runs
Chedwin Park, Spanish Town
Player of the match: Brian Lara (Tri)

5 October 1997
Scorecard

Trinidad and Tobago; 84 (42.3 overs)	v	Jamaica; 85/7 (33.4 overs)

Jamaica won by 3 wickets
Melbourne Park, Kingston
Player of the match: Courtney Walsh (Jam)

5 October 1997
Scorecard

Windward Islands; 332/4 (50 overs)	v	Bermuda; 207/4 (50 overs)

Windward Islands won by 125 runs
Chedwin Park, Spanish Town
Player of the match: Dawnley Joseph (Win)

- Clay Smith scored 100 not out, the first List A century by a Bermudian.
- Dawnley Joseph scored 153 not out for the Windward Islands, setting a new record for the highest score in West Indian List A cricket.

8 October 1997
Scorecard

Bermuda; 87 (41.2 overs)	v	Jamaica; 88/2 (21.1 overs)

Jamaica won by 8 wickets
Alpart Sports Club Ground, Nain
Player of the match: Laurie Williams (Jam)

8 October 1997
Scorecard

Windward Islands; 144 (37.2 overs)	v	Trinidad and Tobago; 141/3 (35.1 overs)

Trinidad and Tobago won by 7 wickets
Melbourne Park, Kingston
Player of the match: Richard Smith (Tri)

- Trinidad and Tobago's target was 139 runs in 45 overs. The team's target was determined used the "parabola" method, rather than the now-standard Duckworth–Lewis method.

=== Zone B ===
Team	Pld	W	L	T	A	Pts	NRR
Guyana	3	3	0	0	0	6	+0.879
Leeward Islands	3	2	1	0	0	4	+0.471
Barbados	3	1	2	0	0	2	+0.109
Canada	3	0	3	0	0	0	–1.508

4 October 1997
Scorecard

Canada; 179 (50 overs)	v	Guyana; 180/3 (40 overs)

Guyana won by 7 wickets
Kayman Sankar Cricket Ground, Hampton Court
Player of the match: Clayton Lambert (Guy)

5 October 1997
Scorecard

Leeward Islands; 202/8 (50 overs)	v	Barbados; 181 (45.1 overs)

Leeward Islands won by 21 runs
Enmore Recreation Ground, Enmore
Player of the match: Sylvester Joseph (Lee)

7 October 1997
Scorecard

Barbados; 258/8 (50 overs)	v	Canada; 155 (41 overs)

Barbados won by 103 runs
Uitvlugt Community Centre Ground, Uitvlugt
Player of the match: Philo Wallace (Bar)

7 October 1997
Scorecard

Leeward Islands; 225/4 (50 overs)	v	Guyana; 226/5 (47.3 overs)

Guyana won by 5 wickets
Albion Sports Complex, Albion
Player of the match: Carl Hooper (Guy)

9 October 1997
Scorecard

Guyana; 296/5 (50 overs)	v	Barbados; 230/9 (50 overs)

Guyana won by 66 runs
Bourda, Georgetown
Player of the match: Clayton Lambert (Guy)

9 October 1997
Scorecard

Leeward Islands; 325/7 (50 overs)	v	Canada; 263/5 (50 overs)

Leeward Islands won by 62 runs
Albion Sports Complex, Albion
Player of the match: Muneeb Diwan (Can)

- Muneeb Diwan scored 130 not out, the first List A century by a Canadian.

== Finals ==
=== Quarter-finals ===
11 October 1997
Scorecard

Barbados; 237/9 (50 overs)	v	Leeward Islands; 238/3 (44.3 overs)

Leeward Islands won by 7 wickets
Albion Sports Complex, Albion
Player of the match: Keith Arthurton (Lee)

11 October 1997
Scorecard

Canada; 223/6 (50 overs)	v	Guyana; 226/3 (47.4 overs)

Guyana won by 7 wickets
Bourda, Georgetown
Player of the match: Keith Semple (Guy)

11 October 1997
Scorecard

Bermuda; 193/7 (50 overs)	v	Jamaica; 7/0 (0.5 overs)

No result
Melbourne Park, Kingston

- Jamaica proceeded to the semi-finals based on a higher group-stage position.

11 October 1997
Scorecard

Trinidad and Tobago	v	Windward Islands

Match abandoned
Chedwin Park, Spanish Town

- Trinidad and Tobago proceeded to the semi-finals based on a higher group-stage position.

=== Semi-finals ===
17 October 1997
Scorecard

Trinidad and Tobago; 219/9 (50 overs)	v	Guyana; 72/0 (11 overs)

No result
Kaiser Sports Club, Discovery Bay

- Guyana proceeded to the final based on a higher group-stage position.

18 October 1997
Scorecard

Jamaica; 214 (49.4 overs)	v	Leeward Islands; 215/2 (38.4 overs)

Leeward Islands won by 8 wickets
Kaiser Sports Club, Discovery Bay
Player of the match: Keith Arthurton (Lee)

=== Final ===
7 November 1997
Scorecard

Leeward Islands; 245 (49.4 overs)	v	Guyana; 215/9 (50 overs)
Keith Arthurton 100 (128); Mahendra Nagamootoo 3/56 (9.4 overs)		Ramnaresh Sarwan 42 (50); Kenny Benjamin 3/30 (10 overs)

Leeward Islands won by 30 runs
Kaiser Sports Club, Discovery Bay
Umpires: Steve Bucknor and Eddie Nicholls
Player of the match: Keith Arthurton (Leeward Islands)

== Statistics ==
=== Most runs ===
The top five run scorers (total runs) are included in this table.

Player	Team	Runs	Inns	Avg	Highest	100s	50s
Keith Arthurton	Leeward Islands	408	6	136.00	103*	2	3
Clayton Lambert	Guyana	398	6	79.60	151	1	2
Dawnley Joseph	Windward Islands	283	3	141.50	153*	1	2
Sylvester Joseph	Leeward Islands	277	6	69.25	84*	0	3
Stuart Williams	Leeward Islands	229	6	38.16	76	0	2

Source: CricketArchive

=== Most wickets ===
The top five wicket takers are listed in this table, listed by wickets taken and then by bowling average.

Player	Team	Overs	Wkts	Ave	SR	Econ	BBI
Kenny Benjamin	Leeward Islands	49.0	11	18.90	26.72	4.24	3/30
Laurie Williams	Jamaica	45.0	9	16.66	30.00	3.33	6/19
Ronald Powell	Leeward Islands	60.0	9	27.11	40.00	4.06	4/27
Mahendra Nagamootoo	Guyana	57.4	9	28.55	38.44	4.45	3/56
Keith Arthurton	Leeward Islands	40.0	8	26.12	30.00	5.22	4/43

Source: CricketArchive
