= 2004–05 Regional One-Day Competition =

Cricket tournament

- Dates: 16 – 31 October 2004
- Administrator: WICB
- Cricket format: List A (50 overs)
- Tournament format(s): Group stage, finals
- Host(s): Barbados; Guyana
- Champions: Trinidad and Tobago (7th title)
- Participants: 6
- Matches: 18
- Most runs: (Nevis) Runako Morton (312)
- Most wickets: (Trinidad and Tobago) Imran Jan (13)

The 2004–05 Regional One-Day Competition was the 31st edition of the Regional Super50, the domestic limited-overs cricket competition for the countries of the West Indies Cricket Board (WICB). The naming rights sponsor for the previous seven seasons, Red Stripe, did not renew their contract, and, in lieu of a replacement, the competition was unbranded for the first time in its history.

For the first time since the 1995–96 season, the competition did not feature any invitational teams, with only the six regular teams of West Indian cricket competing (Barbados, Guyana, Jamaica, the Leeward Islands, Trinidad and Tobago, and the Windward Islands). The round-robin stage was played in Guyana, with the semi-finals and final all played in Barbados. The round-robin was marked by its evenness, with the top four teams all finishing with three wins and two losses. Trinidad and Tobago eventually defeated Guyana in the final to win their seventh domestic one-day title. Leeward Islands batsman Runako Morton led the tournament in runs, while Trinidad and Tobago's Imran Jan took the most wickets.

== Squads ==
Barbados	Guyana	Jamaica
Courtney Browne (c); Sulieman Benn; Ian Bradshaw; Sherwin Campbell; Pedro Collins; Corey Collymore; Ryan Hinds; Ryan Hurley; Antonio Mayers; Martin Nurse; Floyd Reifer; Dale Richards; Dwayne Smith	Shivnarine Chanderpaul (c); Krishna Arjune; Sewnarine Chattergoon; Derwin Christian; Esuan Crandon; Lennox Cush; Damodar Daesrath; Narsingh Deonarine; Travis Dowlin; Rayon Griffith; Reon King; Neil McGarrell; Mahendra Nagamootoo	Gareth Breese (c); Carlton Baugh; David Bernard; Chris Gayle; Wavell Hinds; Danza Hyatt; Tamar Lambert; Evon McInnis; Xavier Marshall; Nikita Miller; Brenton Parchment; Daren Powell; Marlon Samuels; Dwight Washington
Leeward Islands	Trinidad and Tobago	Windward Islands
Sylvester Joseph (c); Alex Adams; Lionel Baker; Omari Banks; Wilden Cornwall; Chaka Hodge; Kerry Jeremy; Runako Morton; Elsroy Powell; Austin Richards; Akito Willett; Tonito Willett; Jason Williams; Stuart Williams	Daren Ganga (c); Jonathan Augustus; Shazam Babwah; Samuel Badree; Rayad Emrit; Sherwin Ganga; Imran Jan; Richard Kelly; Gregory Mahabir; Ricardo Powell; Denesh Ramdin; Rodney Sooklal	Rawl Lewis (c); Deighton Butler; Craig Emmanuel; John Eugene; Orlanzo Jackson; Junior Murray; Kenroy Peters; Darren Sammy; Liam Sebastien; Shane Shillingford; Devon Smith; Fernix Thomas; Roland Wilkinson

== Round-robin stage ==
Team	Pld	W	L	T	NR	BP	Pts	NRR
Barbados	5	3	2	0	0	3	15	+0.597
Windward Islands	5	3	2	0	0	2	14	+0.087
Trinidad and Tobago	5	3	2	0	0	0	12	+0.163
Guyana	5	3	2	0	0	0	12	–0.139
Jamaica	5	2	3	0	0	0	8	–0.409
Leeward Islands	5	1	4	0	0	0	4	–0.334

16 October 2004
Scorecard

Barbados; 209/8 (50 overs)	v	Trinidad and Tobago; 210/7 (41.5 overs)

Trinidad and Tobago won by 3 wickets
Enmore Recreation Ground, Enmore
Player of the match: Sherwin Ganga (Tri)

16 October 2004
Scorecard

Jamaica; 139 (36.5 overs)	v	Windward Islands; 141/3 (23.5 overs)

Leeward Islands won by 9 wickets
Bourda, Georgetown
Player of the match: Rawl Lewis (Win)

17 October 2004
Scorecard

Guyana; 172 (47.1 overs)	v	Windward Islands; 138 (46.2 overs)

Guyana won by 34 runs
Kayman Sankar Cricket Ground, Hampton Court
Player of the match: Narsingh Deonarine (Guy)

17 October 2004
Scorecard

Jamaica; 245/9 (50 overs)	v	Leeward Islands; 225/8 (50 overs)

Jamaica won by 20 runs
Uitvlugt Community Centre Ground, Uitvlugt
Player of the match: Runako Morton (Lee)

18 October 2004
Scorecard

Leeward Islands; 157 (48.4 overs)	v	Barbados; 158/4 (37.2 overs)

Barbados won by 6 wickets
Enmore Recreation Ground, Enmore
Player of the match: Martin Nurse (Bar)

19 October 2004
Scorecard

Trinidad and Tobago; 210/7 (50 overs)	v	Guyana; 213/5 (48.2 overs)

Guyana won by 5 wickets
Albion Sports Complex, Albion
Player of the match: Shivnarine Chanderpaul (Guy)

20 October 2004
Scorecard

Windward Islands; 127 (47.3 overs)	v	Barbados; 129/5 (37.1 overs)

Barbados won by 5 wickets
Uitvlugt Community Centre Ground, Uitvlugt
Player of the match: Ryan Hinds (Bar)

20 October 2004
Scorecard

Guyana; 199 (50 overs)	v	Leeward Islands; 200/6 (49.1 overs)

Leeward Islands won by 4 wickets
Albion Sports Complex, Albion
Player of the match: Wilden Cornwall (Lee)

21 October 2004
Scorecard

Jamaica; 206 (46.2 overs)	v	Trinidad and Tobago; 209/8 (49.1 overs)

Trinidad and Tobago won by 2 wickets
Bourda, Georgetown
Player of the match: Sherwin Ganga (Tri)

21 October 2004
Scorecard

Leeward Islands; 228/9 (50 overs)	v	Windward Islands; 230/9 (49.5 overs)

Windward Islands won by 1 wicket
Blairmont Sports Club Ground, Blairmont

22 October 2004
Scorecard

Jamaica; 165 (49.5 overs)	v	Barbados; 158 (45.5 overs)

Jamaica won by 7 runs
Uitvlugt Community Centre Ground, Uitvlugt
Player of the match: Marlon Samuels (Jam)

23 October 2004
Scorecard

Barbados; 244/7 (50 overs)	v	Guyana; 164 (37.4 overs)

Barbados won by 80 runs
Bourda, Georgetown
Player of the match: Floyd Reifer (Bar)

23 October 2004
Scorecard

Windward Islands; 219 (49.1 overs)	v	Trinidad and Tobago; 218/9 (50 overs)

Windward Islands won by 1 run
Enmore Recreation Ground, Enmore

24 October 2004
Scorecard

Jamaica; 234/5 (50 overs)	v	Guyana; 236/7 (49 overs)

Guyana won by 3 wickets
Bourda, Georgetown
Player of the match: Xavier Marshall (Jam)

24 October 2004
Scorecard

Trinidad and Tobago; 219 (49.1 overs)	v	Leeward Islands; 211 (49.1 overs)

Trinidad and Tobago won by 8 runs
Uitvlugt Community Centre Ground, Uitvlugt
Player of the match: Richard Kelly (Tri)

== Finals ==
=== Semi-finals ===
28 October 2004
Scorecard

Barbados; 276/5 (50 overs)	v	Trinidad and Tobago; 256/5 (46.2 overs)

Trinidad and Tobago won by 11 runs (D/L)
Windward Park, Lucas Street
Player of the match: Sherwin Ganga (Tri)

- When rain stopped play, Trinidad and Tobago needed to have scored 246 runs to win.

29 October 2004
Scorecard

Windward Islands; 174/9 (50 overs)	v	Guyana; 175/2 (45 overs)

Guyana won by 8 wickets
Windward Park, Lucas Street
Player of the match: Lennox Cush (Guy)

=== Final ===
16 October 2005
Scorecard

Guyana; 160 (43.4 overs)	v	Trinidad and Tobago; 161/6 (39.2 overs)

Trinidad and Tobago won by 4 wickets
Kensington Oval, Bridgetown
Player of the match: Richard Kelly (Tri)

== Statistics ==
=== Most runs ===
The top five run scorers (total runs) are included in this table.

Player	Team	Runs	Inns	Avg	Highest	100s	50s
Runako Morton	Leeward Islands	312	5	104.00	101*	1	3
Xavier Marshall	Jamaica	303	5	75.75	125*	1	2
Daren Ganga	Trinidad and Tobago	273	7	45.50	101*	1	1
Junior Murray	Windward Islands	234	6	46.80	71*	0	2
Sherwin Ganga	Trinidad and Tobago	232	7	33.14	64	0	2

Source: CricketArchive

=== Most wickets ===
The top five wicket takers are listed in this table, listed by wickets taken and then by bowling average.

Player	Team	Overs	Wkts	Ave	SR	Econ	BBI
Imran Jan	Trinidad and Tobago	54.2	13	18.00	25.07	4.30	4/46
Reon King	Guyana	60.2	11	22.54	32.90	4.11	3/27
Kenroy Peters	Windward Islands	32.1	10	9.50	19.30	2.95	3/24
Wilden Cornwall	Leeward Islands	48.2	10	21.80	29.00	4.51	5/36
Sherwin Ganga	Trinidad and Tobago	66.0	10	24.70	39.60	3.74	3/28

Source: CricketArchive
