= 2010 World Twenty20 =

Third edition of the ICC Men's T20 World Cup

2010 ICC World Twenty20
- Tournament logo
- Dates: 30 April – 16 May 2010
- Administrator: International Cricket Council
- Cricket format: Twenty20 International
- Tournament format(s): Group stage and Knockout
- Host: West Indies
- Champions: England (1st title)
- Runners-up: Australia
- Participants: 12
- Matches: 27
- Player of the series: (England) Kevin Pietersen
- Most runs: (Sri Lanka) Mahela Jayawardene (302)
- Most wickets: (Australia) Dirk Nannes (14)
- Official website: www.icc-cricket.com

The 2010 ICC World Twenty20 was the third edition of the Men's T20 World Cup, formerly known as the ICC World Twenty20, an international Twenty20 cricket tournament that was held in the West Indies between 30 April and 16 May 2010. It was won by England, who defeated Australia in the final. Kevin Pietersen was named as player of the tournament.

Although the tournament was held every two years beginning in 2007, the scheduled ICC Champions Trophy, One Day International tournament to be held in the West Indies in 2010 was revised to a Twenty20 format because the 2008 Champions Trophy tournament in Pakistan was postponed due to security concerns and there was a need to correct the international cricketing tournament calendar.

This ICC World Twenty20 took place only 10 months after the last one. As before, the tournament featured 12 teams – the Test-playing nations and two qualifiers. Matches were played at three grounds – Kensington Oval in Bridgetown, Barbados; Providence Stadium in Providence, Guyana; and Beausejour Stadium in Gros Islet, Saint Lucia. The tournament was organised in parallel with the women's tournament, with the men's semi-finals and final each being preceded by the semi-finals and final from the women's event.

This competition also saw Afghanistan make their first ever appearance in a major ICC international cricket tournament, and was made even more remarkable as at the time they only held Affiliate Membership and subsequently became the only Affiliate member ever to compete in a major ICC international cricket tournament.

== Qualification ==
Teams from every ICC Region :

Africa (2)

- South Africa
- Zimbabwe

Americas (1)

- West Indies (host)

Asia (5)

- Afghanistan
- Bangladesh
- India
- Pakistan
- Sri Lanka

East Asia-Pacific (2)

- Australia
- New Zealand

Europe (2)

- England
- Ireland

The ICC World Twenty20 qualifier was won by Afghanistan who defeated Ireland by 8 wickets in the final with both sides qualifying for the 2010 ICC World Twenty20. This was the first major tournament Afghanistan qualified for, while leading associates the Netherlands and Scotland failed to qualify this time.

== Venues ==
All matches were played at the following three grounds:

Gros Islet, St Lucia	Bridgetown, Barbados	Providence, Guyana
Beausejour Stadium; Capacity:20,000	Kensington Oval; Capacity: 28,000	Providence Stadium; Capacity: 15,000
2010 World Twenty20 is located in CFU

== Rules and regulations ==
During the group stage and Super Eight, points are awarded to the teams as follows:

Results	Points
Win	2 points
No result	1 point
Loss	0 points

In case of a tie (i.e. both teams score exactly the same number of runs at the end of their respective innings), a Super Over decides the winner. This is applicable in all stages of the tournament.

Within each group (of both group and Super Eight stages), teams are ranked against each other based on the following criteria:

1. Higher number of points
2. If equal, higher number of wins
3. If still equal, higher net run rate
4. If still equal, lower bowling strike rate
5. If still equal, result of head-to-head meeting.

== Groups ==
The groups were announced on 4 July 2009. The initial four group format is the same as that used at the 2009 tournament. Team seed in brackets.

Group A

- Pakistan (1)
- Bangladesh (9)
- Australia (10)

Group B

- Sri Lanka (2)
- New Zealand (5)
- Zimbabwe

Group C

- South Africa (3)
- India (7)
- Afghanistan

Group D

- West Indies (4)
- England (6)
- Ireland

Notes

- Afghanistan and Ireland qualified via the 2010 ICC World Twenty20 Qualifier.
- As Zimbabwe withdrew from the 2009 competition, they failed to achieve a seed for the 2010 competition.
- As Ireland reached the Super Eight stage of the 2009 competition, they would have been the eighth seed if they were a Test-playing nation. Therefore, an eighth seed is missing from the competition.

== Match officials ==
=== Umpires ===
Umpire	Country	Panel
Billy Bowden	New Zealand	Elite
Aleem Dar	Pakistan	Elite
Steve Davis	Australia	Elite
Billy Doctrove	West Indies	Elite
Ian Gould	England	Elite
Tony Hill	New Zealand	Elite
Rudi Koertzen	South Africa	Elite
Asad Rauf	Pakistan	Elite
Asoka de Silva	Sri Lanka	Elite
Simon Taufel	Australia	Elite
Marais Erasmus	South Africa	International
Shavir Tarapore	India	International
Rod Tucker	Australia	International

=== Referees ===
Referee	Country
Alan Hurst	Australia
Ranjan Madugalle	Sri Lanka

== Warm-up matches ==
Matches

20 April
17:00
Scorecard

Ireland; 90 (17.1 overs)	v	Trinidad and Tobago; 96/1 (7.1 overs)
Gary Wilson 37 (42); Sherwin Ganga 3/12 (3 overs)		Lendl Simmons 46* (20); George Dockrell 1/20 (2 overs)

Trinidad & Tobago won by 9 wickets
Queen's Park Oval, Port of Spain
Umpires: Peter Nero and Rawle Richards

23 April
17:00
Scorecard

Trinidad and Tobago; 104 (19.5 overs)	v	Ireland; 105/1 (15.1 overs)
Samuel Badree 20 (19); George Dockrell 3/20 (4 overs)		Paul Stirling 57 (41); Sherwin Ganga 1/20 (3 overs)

Ireland won by 9 wickets
Queen's Park Oval, Port of Spain
Umpires: Danesh Ramdhanie and Anthony Sanawar

- Trinidad & Tobago won the toss and elected to bat.

27 April
09:30
Scorecard

Pakistan; 160/7 (20 overs)	v	Windward Islands; 92/4 (20 overs)
Mohammad Hafeez 57 (40); Mervin Matthew 2/22 (4 overs)		Keddy Lesporis 24 (33); Shahid Afridi 1/11 (3 overs)

Pakistan won by 68 runs
Beausejour Stadium, Gros Islet
Umpires: Marais Erasmus (SA) and Shavir Tarapore (Ind)

- Windward Islands won the toss and elected to field.

27 April
13:30
Scorecard

Zimbabwe; 173/7 (20 overs)	v	Australia; 172/7 (20 overs)
Elton Chigumbura 76 (35); Mitchell Johnson 4/23 (4 overs)		David Warner 72 (49); Prosper Utseya 2/27 (4 overs)

Zimbabwe won by 1 run
Beausejour Stadium, Gros Islet
Umpires: Asoka de Silva (SL) and Marais Erasmus (SA)

- Zimbabwe won the toss and elected to bat.

27 April
13:30
Scorecard

Bangladesh; 166/5 (20 overs)	v	Barbados; 130/3 (20 overs)
Imrul Kayes 57 (35); Martin Nurse 3/21 (3 overs)		Ryan Hinds 50* (48); Abdur Razzak 1/7 (2 overs)

Bangladesh won by 36 runs
Kensington Oval, Bridgetown
Umpires: Aleem Dar (Pak) and Tony Hill (NZ)

- Barbados won the toss and elected to field.

27 April
13:30
Scorecard

New Zealand; 187/5 (20 overs)	v	Ireland; 147/9 (20 overs)
Jesse Ryder 64 (30); George Dockrell 3/24 (4 overs)		William Porterfield 34 (27); Nathan McCullum 3/25 (4 overs)

New Zealand won by 40 runs
Providence Stadium, Guyana
Umpires: Asad Rauf (Pak) and Billy Doctrove (WI)

- New Zealand won the toss and elected to bat.

28 April
09:30
Scorecard

Sri Lanka; 137/8 (20 overs)	v	South Africa; 141/5 (19.3 overs)
Chamara Kapugedera 61* (35); Rory Kleinveldt 2/13 (3 overs)		Mark Boucher 33* (20); Sanath Jayasuriya 1/18 (4 overs)

South Africa won by 5 wickets
Kensington Oval, Bridgetown
Umpires: Aleem Dar (Pak) and Rod Tucker (Aus)

- Sri Lanka won the toss and elected to bat.

28 April
13:30
Scorecard

Ireland; 133/9 (20 overs)	v	Afghanistan; 134/5 (19.3 overs)
John Mooney 42 (33); Dawlat Ahmadzai 4/15 (4 overs)		Asghar Stanikzai 39* (27); Alex Cusack 2/12 (2 overs)

Afghanistan won by 5 wickets
Providence Stadium, Guyana
Umpires: Steve Davis (Aus) and Billy Doctrove (WI)

- Afghanistan won the toss and elected to field.

28 April
13:30
Scorecard

Bangladesh; 126/7 (20 overs)	v	England; 127/3 (17.1 overs)
Mahmudullah 38 (31); Michael Yardy 3/20 (4 overs)		Ravi Bopara 62 (49); Shakib Al Hasan 1/23 (4 overs)

England won by 7 wickets
Kensington Oval, Bridgetown
Umpires: Billy Bowden (NZ) and Tony Hill (NZ)

- Bangladesh won the toss and elected to bat.

28 April
17:00
Scorecard

New Zealand; 124/8 (20 overs)	v	West Indies; 117 (19.4 overs)
Ross Taylor 50 (35); Sulieman Benn 2/12 (4 overs)		Shivnarine Chanderpaul 53 (47); Scott Styris 4/18 (4 overs)

New Zealand won by 7 runs
Providence Stadium, Guyana
Umpires: Asad Rauf (Pak) and Billy Doctrove (WI)

- New Zealand won the toss and elected to bat.

29 April
09:30
Scorecard

Australia; 189/8 (20 overs)	v	Windward Islands; 88/10 (20 overs)
David Warner 51; Mervin Matthew 3/34 (4 overs)		Lyndon James 20*; Michael Clarke 2/6 (2 overs)

Australia won by 101 runs
Beausejour Stadium, Gros Islet
Umpires: Asoka de Silva (SL) and Marais Erasmus (SA)

- Windward Islands won the toss and elected to field.
- Windward Islands were allowed a 12-man batting line-up, including Australians Tim Paine and Nathan Hauritz.

29 April
13:30
Scorecard

South Africa; 125/5 (20 overs)	v	England; 127/5 (19.3 overs)
Albie Morkel 32* (21); Michael Yardy 2/25 (4 overs)		Eoin Morgan 63 (62); Rory Kleinveldt 2/22 (4 overs)

England won by 5 wickets
Kensington Oval, Bridgetown
Umpires: Billy Bowden (NZ) and Rod Tucker (Aus)

- South Africa won the toss and elected to bat.

30 April
13:30

Afghanistan; 143/5 (20 overs)	v	Nepal; 40 (12.2 overs)
Nawroz Mangal 89* (25); Gyanendra Malla 3/24 (4 overs)		Gyanendra Malla 17 (34); Nawroz Mangal 7/15 (4 overs)

Afghanistan won by 103 runs
Beausejour Stadium, Gros Islet
Umpires: Shavir Tarapore (Ind) and Simon Taufel (Aus)

- Nepal won the toss and elected to field.

== Group stage ==
=== Group A ===
Pos	Seed	Team	Pld	W	L	NR	Pts	NRR
1	A2	Australia (10)	2	2	0	0	4	1.525
2	A1	Pakistan (1)	2	1	1	0	2	−0.325
3		Bangladesh (9)	2	0	2	0	0	−1.200

Source: ESPNCricInfo

1 May
13:30
Scorecard

Pakistan; 172/3 (20 overs)	v	Bangladesh; 151/7 (20 overs)
Salman Butt 73 (46); Shakib Al Hasan 2/27 (4 overs)		Mohammad Ashraful 65 (49); Mohammad Sami 3/29 (4 overs)

Pakistan won by 21 runs
Beausejour Stadium, Gros Islet
Umpires: Asoka de Silva (SL) and Rod Tucker (Aus)
Player of the match: Salman Butt (Pak)

- Pakistan won the toss and elected to bat.

2 May
13:30
Scorecard

Australia; 191 (20 overs)	v	Pakistan; 157 (20 overs)
Shane Watson 81 (49); Mohammad Amir 3/23 (4 overs)		Misbah-ul-Haq 41 (31); Shaun Tait 3/20 (4 overs)

Australia won by 34 runs
Beausejour Stadium, Gros Islet
Umpires: Asoka de Silva (SL) and Shavir Tarapore (Ind)
Player of the match: Shane Watson (Aus)

- Australia won the toss and elected to bat.
- Five wickets fell in the final over of Australia's innings. Mohammad Amir bowled a triple-wicket maiden and there were two run-outs.
- Australia qualified for the Super 8s as a result of this match.

5 May
13:00
Scorecard

Australia; 141/7 (20 overs)	v	Bangladesh; 114 (18.4 overs)
Michael Hussey 47* (29); Shakib Al Hasan 2/24 (4 overs)		Shakib Al Hasan 28 (28); Dirk Nannes 4/18 (4 overs)

Australia won by 27 runs
Kensington Oval, Bridgetown
Umpires: Aleem Dar (Pak) and Billy Doctrove (WI)
Player of the match: Michael Hussey (Aus)

- Australia won the toss and elected to bat.
- Pakistan qualified for the Super 8s as a result of this match.

=== Group B ===
Pos	Seed	Team	Pld	W	L	NR	Pts	NRR
1	B2	New Zealand (5)	2	2	0	0	4	0.428
2	B1	Sri Lanka (2)	2	1	1	0	2	0.355
3		Zimbabwe	2	0	2	0	0	−1.595

Source: ESPNCricInfo

30 April
13:00
Scorecard

Sri Lanka; 135/6 (20 overs)	v	New Zealand; 139/8 (19.5 overs)
Mahela Jayawardene 81 (51); Shane Bond 2/35 (4 overs)		Jesse Ryder 42 (27); Muttiah Muralitharan 2/25 (4 overs)

New Zealand won by 2 wickets
Providence Stadium, Guyana
Umpires: Steve Davis (Aus) and Rudi Koertzen (SA)
Player of the match: Nathan McCullum (NZ)

- Sri Lanka won the toss and elected to bat.

3 May
09:30
Scorecard

Sri Lanka; 173/7 (20 overs)	v	Zimbabwe; 29/1 (5 overs)
Mahela Jayawardene 100 (64); Ray Price 2/31 (4 overs)		Tatenda Taibu 12* (13)

Sri Lanka won by 14 runs (D/L)
Providence Stadium, Guyana
Umpires: Billy Doctrove (WI) and Ian Gould (Eng)
Player of the match: Mahela Jayawardene (SL)

- Sri Lanka won the toss and elected to bat.
- Rain reduced Zimbabwe's innings to 5 overs. According to the Duckworth–Lewis method, their target was 44 runs.
- Mahela Jayawardene became the fourth man, the third in the ICC World Twenty20 and the first Sri Lankan to score a century in a Twenty20 International.
- Sri Lanka qualified for the Super 8s as a result of this match.

4 May
09:30
Scorecard

Zimbabwe; 84 (15.1 overs)	v	New Zealand; 36/1 (8.1 overs)
Tatenda Taibu 21 (14); Scott Styris 3/5 (2 overs)		Brendon McCullum 22* (26); Prosper Utseya 1/21 (4 overs)

New Zealand won by 7 runs (D/L)
Providence Stadium, Guyana
Umpires: Asad Rauf (Pak) and Steve Davis (Aus)
Player of the match: Nathan McCullum (NZ)

- New Zealand won the toss and elected to field.
- Rain reduced New Zealand's innings to 8.1 overs. According to the Duckworth–Lewis method, their target was 30 runs.
- New Zealand qualified for the Super 8s as a result of this match.

=== Group C ===
Pos	Seed	Team	Pld	W	L	NR	Pts	NRR
1	C2	India (7)	2	2	0	0	4	1.495
2	C1	South Africa (3)	2	1	1	0	2	1.125
3		Afghanistan	2	0	2	0	0	−2.446

Source: ESPNCricInfo

1 May
09:30
Scorecard

Afghanistan; 115/8 (20 overs)	v	India; 116/3 (14.5 overs)
Noor Ali 50 (48); Ashish Nehra 3/19 (4 overs)		Murali Vijay 48 (46); Hamid Hassan 1/8 (3 overs)

India won by 7 wickets
Beausejour Stadium, Gros Islet
Umpires: Aleem Dar (Pak) and Marais Erasmus (SA)
Player of the match: Ashish Nehra (Ind)

- India won the toss and elected to field.

2 May
09:30
Scorecard

India; 186/5 (20 overs)	v	South Africa; 172/5 (20 overs)
Suresh Raina 101 (60); Rory Kleinveldt 2/48 (4 overs)		Jacques Kallis 73 (54); Yusuf Pathan 2/42 (4 overs)

India won by 14 runs
Beausejour Stadium, Gros Islet
Umpires: Aleem Dar (Pak) and Simon Taufel (Aus)
Player of the match: Suresh Raina (Ind)

- South Africa won the toss and elected to field.
- Suresh Raina became the third man, the second in the ICC World Twenty20 and the first Indian to hit a century in a Twenty20 International.
- India qualified for the Super 8s as a result of this match.

5 May
17:00 (D/N)
Scorecard

South Africa; 139/7 (20 overs)	v	Afghanistan; 80 (16 overs)
Jacques Kallis 34 (33); Hamid Hassan 3/21 (4 overs)		Mirwais Ashraf 23 (25); Morné Morkel 4/20 (3 overs)

South Africa won by 59 runs
Kensington Oval, Bridgetown
Umpires: Ian Gould (Eng) and Simon Taufel (Aus)
Player of the match: Morné Morkel (SA)

- Afghanistan won the toss and elected to field.
- South Africa qualified for the Super 8s as a result of this match.

=== Group D ===
Pos	Seed	Team	Pld	W	L	NR	Pts	NRR
1	D1	West Indies (4)	2	2	0	0	4	2.780
2	D2	England (6)	2	0	1	1	1	−0.452
3		Ireland	2	0	1	1	1	−3.500

Source: ESPNCricInfo

30 April
17:00 (D/N)
Scorecard

West Indies; 138/9 (20 overs)	v	Ireland; 68 (16.4 overs)
Darren Sammy 30 (17); George Dockrell 3/16 (4 overs)		Gary Wilson 17 (34); Darren Sammy 3/8 (3.4 overs)

West Indies won by 70 runs
Providence Stadium, Guyana
Umpires: Asad Rauf (Pak) and Billy Bowden (NZ)
Player of the match: Darren Sammy (WI)

- West Indies won the toss and elected to bat.

3 May
13:30
Scorecard

England; 191/5 (20 overs)	v	West Indies; 60/2 (5.5 overs)
Eoin Morgan 55 (35); Darren Sammy 2/22 (4 overs)		Chris Gayle 25 (12); Graeme Swann 2/24 (2 overs)

West Indies won by 8 wickets (D/L)
Providence Stadium, Guyana
Umpires: Tony Hill (NZ) and Rudi Koertzen (SA)
Player of the match: Darren Sammy (WI)

- West Indies won the toss and elected to field.
- Rain reduced the West Indies innings to 6 overs. According to the Duckworth–Lewis method, their target was 60 runs.
- West Indies qualified for the Super 8s as a result of this match.

4 May
13:30
Scorecard

England; 120/8 (20 overs)	v	Ireland; 14/1 (3.3 overs)
Eoin Morgan 45 (37); Kevin O'Brien 2/22 (3 overs)		Niall O'Brien 9* (5); Ryan Sidebottom 1/9 (1.3 overs)

No result
Providence Stadium, Guyana
Umpires: Billy Bowden (NZ) and Tony Hill (NZ)

- Ireland won the toss and elected to field.
- Rain reduced Ireland's innings to 3.3 overs, causing the match to be abandoned.
- England qualified for the Super 8s as a result of this match.

== Super 8s ==
The Super 8s stage consists of the top two teams from each group of the group stage. The teams are split into two groups, Groups E and F. Group E will consist of the top seed from Groups A and C, and the second seed of groups B and D. Group F will consist of the top seed from Groups B and D, and the second seed of groups A and C. The seedings used are those allocated at the start of the tournament and are not affected by group stage results, with the exception of if a non-seeded team knocks out a seeded team, the non-seeded team inherits the seed of the knocked-out team.

Qualification	Super 8s	
Qualification	Group E	Group F
Advanced from group stage	England	Australia
Advanced from group stage	New Zealand	India
Advanced from group stage	Pakistan	Sri Lanka
Advanced from group stage	South Africa	West Indies

=== Group E ===
Pos	Team	Pld	W	L	NR	Pts	NRR
1	England (D2)	3	3	0	0	6	0.962
2	Pakistan (A1)	3	1	2	0	2	0.041
3	New Zealand (B2)	3	1	2	0	2	−0.373
4	South Africa (C1)	3	1	2	0	2	−0.617

Source: ESPNCricInfo

6 May
09:30
Scorecard

Pakistan; 147/9 (20 overs)	v	England; 151/4 (19.3 overs)
Salman Butt 34 (26); Michael Yardy 2/19 (4 overs)		Kevin Pietersen 73* (52); Saeed Ajmal 2/18 (3.3 overs)

England won by 6 wickets
Kensington Oval, Bridgetown
Umpires: Billy Bowden (NZ) and Rudi Koertzen (SA)
Player of the match: Kevin Pietersen (Eng)

- England won the toss and elected to field.

6 May
13:30
Scorecard

South Africa; 170/4 (20 overs)	v	New Zealand; 157/7 (20 overs)
AB de Villiers 47* (39); Jacob Oram 1/22 (3 overs)		Jesse Ryder 33 (28); Johan Botha 2/23 (3 overs)

South Africa won by 13 runs
Kensington Oval, Bridgetown
Umpires: Aleem Dar (Pak) and Steve Davis (Aus)
Player of the match: Albie Morkel (SA)

- South Africa won the toss and elected to bat.

8 May
09:30
Scorecard

New Zealand; 133/7 (20 overs)	v	Pakistan; 132/7 (20 overs)
Daniel Vettori 38 (34); Abdur Rehman 2/19 (3 overs)		Salman Butt 67* (54); Ian Butler 3/19 (4 overs)

New Zealand won by 1 run
Kensington Oval, Bridgetown
Umpires: Billy Doctrove (WI) and Ian Gould (Eng)
Player of the match: Ian Butler (NZ)

- Pakistan won the toss and elected to field.

8 May
13:30
Scorecard

England; 168/7 (20 overs)	v	South Africa; 129 (19 overs)
Kevin Pietersen 53 (33); Johan Botha 2/15 (4 overs)		JP Duminy 39 (25); Ryan Sidebottom 3/23 (4 overs)

England won by 39 runs
Kensington Oval, Bridgetown
Umpires: Aleem Dar (Pak) and Steve Davis (Aus)
Player of the match: Kevin Pietersen (Eng)

- England won the toss and elected to bat.

10 May
09:30
Scorecard

Pakistan; 148/7 (20 overs)	v	South Africa; 137/7 (20 overs)
Umar Akmal 51 (33); Charl Langeveldt 4/19 (4 overs)		AB de Villiers 53 (41); Saeed Ajmal 4/26 (4 overs)

Pakistan won by 11 runs
Beausejour Stadium, Gros Islet
Umpires: Billy Doctrove (WI) and Ian Gould (Eng)
Player of the match: Umar Akmal (Pak)

- Pakistan won the toss and elected to bat.
- England qualified for the semi-finals as a result of this match.

10 May
13:30
Scorecard

New Zealand; 149/6 (20 overs)	v	England; 153/7 (19.1 overs)
Ross Taylor 44 (33); Graeme Swann 2/31 (4 overs)		Eoin Morgan 40 (34); Scott Styris 2/16 (3 overs)

England won by 3 wickets
Beausejour Stadium, Gros Islet
Umpires: Steve Davis (Aus) and Simon Taufel (Aus)
Player of the match: Tim Bresnan (Eng)

- New Zealand won the toss and elected to bat.
- Pakistan qualified for the semi-finals as a result of this match.

=== Group F ===
Pos	Team	Pld	W	L	NR	Pts	NRR
1	Australia (A2)	3	3	0	0	6	2.733
2	Sri Lanka (B1)	3	2	1	0	4	−0.333
3	West Indies (D1)	3	1	2	0	2	−1.281
4	India (C2)	3	0	3	0	0	−1.117

Source: ESPNCricInfo

7 May
09:30
Scorecard

Australia; 184/5 (20 overs)	v	India; 135 (17.4 overs)
David Warner 72 (42); Yuvraj Singh 2/20 (2 overs)		Rohit Sharma 79* (46); Shaun Tait 3/21 (3.4 overs)

Australia won by 49 runs
Kensington Oval, Bridgetown
Umpires: Billy Bowden (NZ) and Billy Doctrove (WI)
Player of the match: David Warner (Aus)

- India won the toss and elected to field.

7 May
13:30
Scorecard

Sri Lanka; 195/3 (20 overs)	v	West Indies; 138/8 (20 overs)
Mahela Jayawardene 98* (56); Kemar Roach 2/27 (4 overs)		Ramnaresh Sarwan 28 (33); Ajantha Mendis 3/24 (4 overs)

Sri Lanka won by 57 runs
Kensington Oval, Bridgetown
Umpires: Rudi Koertzen (SA) and Simon Taufel (Aus)
Player of the match: Mahela Jayawardene (SL)

- Sri Lanka won the toss and elected to bat.

9 May
09:30
Scorecard

West Indies; 169/6 (20 overs)	v	India; 155/9 (20 overs)
Chris Gayle 98 (66); Ashish Nehra 3/35 (4 overs)		Suresh Raina 32 (25); Kemar Roach 2/38 (4 overs)

West Indies won by 14 runs
Kensington Oval, Bridgetown
Umpires: Billy Bowden (NZ) and Simon Taufel (Aus)
Player of the match: Chris Gayle (WI)

- India won the toss and elected to field.

9 May
14:00
Scorecard

Australia; 168/5 (20 overs)	v	Sri Lanka; 87 (16.2 overs)
Cameron White 85* (49); Suraj Randiv 3/20 (4 overs)		Tillakaratne Dilshan 20 (12); Mitchell Johnson 3/15 (3.2 overs)

Australia won by 81 runs
Kensington Oval, Bridgetown
Umpires: Ian Gould (Eng) and Rudi Koertzen (SA)
Player of the match: Cameron White (Aus)

- Australia won the toss and elected to bat.

11 May
13:00
Scorecard

India; 163/5 (20 overs)	v	Sri Lanka; 167/5 (20 overs)
Suresh Raina 63 (47); Lasith Malinga 2/25 (4 overs)		Kumar Sangakkara 46 (33); Vinay Kumar 2/30 (4 overs)

Sri Lanka won by 5 wickets
Beausejour Stadium, Gros Islet
Umpires: Aleem Dar (Pak) and Steve Davis (Aus)
Player of the match: Angelo Mathews (SL)

- India won the toss and elected to bat.

11 May
17:00 (D/N)
Scorecard

West Indies; 105 (19 overs)	v	Australia; 109/4 (16.2 overs)
Ramnaresh Sarwan 26 (31); Steve Smith 3/20 (4 overs)		Brad Haddin 42 (46); Chris Gayle 1/5 (0.2 overs)

Australia won by 6 wickets
Beausejour Stadium, Gros Islet
Umpires: Billy Bowden (NZ) and Rudi Koertzen (SA)
Player of the match: Steve Smith (Aus)

- West Indies won the toss and elected to bat.
- Sri Lanka and Australia qualified for the semi-finals as a result of this match.

== Knockout stage ==
Semi-finals
13 May – St Lucia
England	132/3
Sri Lanka	128/6
14 May – St Lucia
Australia	197/7
Pakistan	191/6

Final
16 May – Barbados
England	148/3
Australia	147/6

=== Semi-finals ===
13 May
11:30
Scorecard

Sri Lanka; 128/6 (20 overs)	v	England; 132/3 (16 overs)
Angelo Mathews 58 (45); Stuart Broad 2/21 (4 overs)		Kevin Pietersen 42* (26); Thissara Perera 2/19 (2 overs)

England won by 7 wickets
Beausejour Stadium, Gros Islet
Umpires: Aleem Dar (Pak) and Simon Taufel (Aus)
Player of the match: Stuart Broad (Eng)

- Sri Lanka won the toss and elected to bat.

14 May
11:30
Scorecard

Pakistan; 191/6 (20 overs)	v	Australia; 197/7 (19.5 overs)
Umar Akmal 56* (35); Steve Smith 1/23 (2 overs)		Michael Hussey 60* (24); Mohammad Amir 3/35 (4 overs)

Australia won by 3 wickets
Beausejour Stadium, Gros Islet
Umpires: Billy Doctrove (WI) and Ian Gould (Eng)
Player of the match: Michael Hussey (Aus)

- Australia won the toss and elected to field.

=== Final ===
The final, played in Barbados on 16 May 2010, featured the game's oldest rivalry less than six months before the Ashes in Australia. England won by seven wickets with three overs to spare to seal its first International Cricket Council world championship after losses in three World Cup finals – 1979 against the West Indies at Lord's, 1987 against Australia and 1992 against Pakistan – and a loss in the 2004 Champions Trophy final to the West Indies on home soil. Australia batted first and scored 147 runs for the loss of six wickets, with David Hussey's top score of 59 proving crucial after England had reduced the Aussies to 8/3 after 2.1 overs and then removed captain Michael Clarke. England bettered Australia's total with 18 balls to spare, reaching 148 runs for the loss of three wickets, with Craig Kieswetter (63 runs) and Kevin Pietersen (47 runs) combining for a 111-run partnership for the second wicket before captain Paul Collingwood hit the winning run. Pietersen was subsequently named Man of the Tournament having scored 248 runs, while Kieswetter was named Man of the Match having scored his first T20 international half-century in the final.

16 May
11:30
Scorecard

Australia; 147/6 (20 overs)	v	England; 148/3 (17 overs)
David Hussey 59 (54); Ryan Sidebottom 2/26 (4 overs)		Craig Kieswetter 63 (49); Steve Smith 1/21 (3 overs)

England won by 7 wickets
Kensington Oval, Bridgetown
Umpires: Aleem Dar (Pak) and Billy Doctrove (WI)
Player of the match: Craig Kieswetter (Eng)

- England won the toss and elected to field.
- This was the first ICC event won by England.

== Media coverage ==
=== Television ===
Territory	Broadcaster(s)
Afghanistan	Ariana Television Network; Lemar TV
Australia	Fox Sports
Africa	Supersport
Bangladesh	Bangladesh Television
Singapore	Star Cricket
Caribbean	Caribbean Media Corporation
Canada	Asian Television Network
Europe (Except UK & Ireland)	Eurosport2
China	ESPN Star Sports
India	ESPN; Star Cricket; DD National mostly India matches
Jamaica	Television Jamaica
Japan	Hum Tum TV
Middle East	CricOne
Nepal	ESPN; Star Cricket
Fiji	Fiji TV
New Zealand	Sky Sport
Pacific Islands	Sky Pacific
Pakistan	GEO Super; Pakistan Television Corporation
South Africa	Supersport; SABC 3 Sport
Sri Lanka	Sri Lanka Rupavahini Corporation
United Kingdom	Sky Sports
Ireland	Sky Sports
USA	DirecTV CricketTicket

=== Radio ===
Territory	Broadcaster
Australia	ABC Local Radio
India	All India Radio
West Indies	Caribbean Media Corporation
Bangladesh	Bangladesh Betar
Canada	EchoStar
Central America	EchoStar
United Kingdom	BBC Radio
Ireland	BBC Radio
Pakistan	Hum FM
United Arab Emirates	Hum FM

=== Internet ===
Region	Broadcaster(s)
United Kingdom	BSkyB
Ireland	BSkyB
West Indies	Caribbean Media Corporation
USA	DirecTV
India	ESPN STAR Sports
Pakistan	ESPN STAR Sports
Bangladesh	ESPN STAR Sports
Nepal	ESPN STAR Sports
Bhutan	ESPN STAR Sports
Sri Lanka	ESPN STAR Sports
Maldives	ESPN STAR Sports
Europe (rest)	Eurosport
Australia	Fox Sports
New Zealand	Sky Sport
Africa	SuperSport
Other countries	ESPN Star Sports
