= McInnis =

McInnis is a surname originating from the Isle of Skye. Notable people with the surname include:

- Brandon McInnis, American voice actor
- David Lee McInnis (born 1973), American actor
- Evon McInnis (born 1980), Jamaican cricketer
- James McInnis (1855–1917), Prince Edward Island politician
- Jan McInnis, American stand-up comedian
- Jeff McInnis (born 1974), American basketball player
- John K. McInnis (1854–1923), Canadian educator and politician
- John McInnis (c. 1880 – 1972), Canadian businessman and politician
- John McInnis (1950–2003), Canadian politician
- Marty McInnis (born 1970), American ice hockey player
- Maurie McInnis (born 1966), American academic
- Nadine McInnis, Canadian writer
- Scott McInnis (born 1953), American lawyer and politician
- Stanley McInnis (1865–1907), Canadian politician
- Stuffy McInnis (1890–1960), American baseball player

== See also ==
- McInnis Canyons National Conservation Area, protected area in the United States
- John McInnis Jr. Secondary School, Canadian high school
