= Hans Boerstra =

Dutch cricketer

Personal information
- Full name: Hans J. H. Boerstra
- Born: 6 January 1965 (age 61); Voorburg, Netherlands
- Batting: Right-handed
- Bowling: Right-arm medium

Career statistics
Competition	List A
Matches	2
Runs scored	7
Batting average	3.50
100s/50s	0/0
Top score	6
Balls bowled	66
Wickets	1
Bowling average	59.00
5 wickets in innings	0
10 wickets in match	0
Best bowling	1/45
Catches/stumpings	0/0
- Source: Cricinfo, 11 December 2025

Hans J. H. Boerstra (born 6 January 1965) is a former Dutch international cricketer who represented the Dutch national side between 1991 and 1996. He played as a right-arm medium-pace bowler.

Boerstra was born in Voorburg, South Holland, and played his club cricket for Voorburg Cricket Club (VCC). He made his debut for the Netherlands in August 1991, in a one-day match against the West Indies (returning from a tour of England). Boerstra made his List A debut in June 1995, in a NatWest Trophy game against Northamptonshire. He made another NatWest Trophy appearance the following year, against Surrey, but played no further matches for the national team after that year.
