= Shiv Seeram =

Guyanese cricketer

Personal information
- Full name: Shivnath Seeram
- Born: 25 September 1963 (age 63); Ogle, British Guiana
- Batting: Right-handed
- Bowling: Right-arm medium
- Relatives: Ravindranauth Seeram (brother)

International information
- National side: Canada (1996–1998)

Domestic team information
- Years: Team
- 1985: Demerara (Guyana)
- Source: ESPNcricinfo, 2 February 2016

Shivnath "Shiv" Seeram (born 25 September 1963) is a former international cricketer who represented the Canadian national side between 1996 and 1998. He was born in Guyana, and before emigrating to Canada played first-class cricket for Demerara.

Seeram was born in Ogle, a village in Guyana's Demerara-Mahaica region. In November 1985, he represented Demerara against Berbice in the final of the Guystac Trophy, which at the time held first-class status. After emigrating to Canada, Seeram made his debut for the national team in October 1996, playing in the Shell/Sandals Trophy (a West Indian domestic competition in which Canada were competing as a guest team). At that tournament, he shared the wicket-keeping duties with Alex Glegg, although in all other matches for Canada he played solely as a batsman. The following year, Seeram played in the 1997 ICC Trophy in Malaysia, featuring in six of his team's seven matches. He had little success, however, scoring only 76 runs in six innings (with a best of 25 against Denmark). Seeram's final match for Canada came in the 1997–98 Red Stripe Bowl (the renamed Shell/Sandals Trophy), against his country of origin, Guyana.
