= West Indian cricket team in England in 1991 =

International cricket tour

West Indies in England 1991
	West Indies	England
- Dates: 14 May – 12 August 1991
Captains	Viv Richards	Graham Gooch

Test series
- Result: 5-match series drawn 2–2
Most runs	Richie Richardson (495)	Graham Gooch (480)
Most wickets	Curtly Ambrose (28)	Phillip DeFreitas (22)
- Player of the series: Curtly Ambrose and Graham Gooch

One Day International series
- Results: England won the 3-match series 3–0
Most runs	Viv Richards (145)	Michael Atherton (168)
Most wickets	Patrick Patterson (4)	Chris Lewis (4); Ian Botham (4); David Lawrence (4)
- Player of the series: Viv Richards and Michael Atherton

The West Indian cricket team in England in 1991 played three one day internationals and five Tests, under the captaincy of Viv Richards, as part of an extensive tour in which they also played first-class matches against 11 first-class county teams, the combined Minor Counties, the Combined Universities of Oxford and Cambridge, and a World XI to finish, plus 55-over one-day matches against one more first-class county (Gloucestershire) and the Duchess of Norfolk's Invitation XI. Of the non-international matches, West Indies defeated Kent, Middlesex and Leicestershire in the longer matches, and Gloucestershire over 55 overs, and lost only the opening match against the Duchess of Norfolk's XI: all the other matches were drawn, although some were close to a finish. England, by contrast with the previous disastrous tour of 1988, were a far more settled side, and gave a far better account of themselves under the captaincy of Graham Gooch.

The ODI series was won 3-0 by England: the Test series was drawn 2-2.

== West Indian squad ==
The West Indies of 1988 had been thought to be quite a mixture, of aging batsmen with only Hooper as a real newcomer, and younger bowlers with only Marshall as a veteran. The basic core of the squad was almost the same, three years later: Gordon Greenidge promising that this time really would be his final tour, as did Viv Richards and wicketkeeper Jeff Dujon, while Desmond Haynes was also aging but would hang around a few years yet, Gus Logie had the intention to do likewise, Richie Richardson had matured into one of the best batsmen in the world - throughout the tour he fought with England's Gooch and Smith over this designation, the actual ranking changing hands several times - and Carl Hooper also now sure of his place. Phil Simmons, the reserve opening batsman who had suffered a serious head injury in a county match three years before, was hoping to get a chance most likely in the county or one-day matches, and Brian Lara, the only left-hander in the squad, was already being talked about as the next big thing in West Indian batting. Reserve wicketkeeper David Williams was there mainly to be tried out in the county matches, with a view to taking over after Dujon's retirement. For the bowlers, Malcolm Marshall was already planning to join Richards, Greenidge and Dujon in retirement after the tour, but Curtly Ambrose and Courtney Walsh, both fairly new in 1988, were now seasoned regulars with many more years in the side ahead of them. But after those three, the picture was less clear. Pat Patterson, fast but erratic, had never quite cemented a place in the team: but Winston Benjamin, often his rival for the last position, had been left behind. Instead, the last three places had gone to Ian Bishop, brilliant but as it turned out injury-prone (he was forced to pull out of the tour before it set off), and to two rookies, Ian Allen and Hamish Anthony - both fairly unproven even at first-class level. There had been some talk of giving a place to Ezra Moseley, who had played when England toured the West Indies in 1989-90; if Moseley, as one of the rebel tourists of South Africa in the early 1980s, could be forgiven, then a case could have been made to invite another such rebel tourist, Franklyn Stephenson. Stephenson was now regularly producing brilliance with both bat and ball for Nottinghamshire, but the selectors decided that both were aging, and opted for youth. They also did not select a specialist spin bowler in the squad, deciding that Hooper and the aging Richards would be most likely all the spin bowling they would need.

== England players ==
England had, if not a fully settled team, then at least a much more solid nucleus of regulars since the 1988 series. Graham Gooch, although nearly 40, was captain, opening batsman, and in the form of his life: having only the previous year scored 333 against India. His long search for a reliable opening partner seemed to have been ended by the emergence of Michael Atherton, who had made the position his own over the previous year with centuries against New Zealand, India and Australia. In the middle order, Allan Lamb was still highly regarded as a fine player of fast bowling, and his record against the West Indies ensured him a place in the team at the start of the summer: while Robin Smith, the only one of many debutants in the disastrous 1988 series to emerge with credit, was utterly fearless against fast bowling, and already recognised as world-class. Internal squabbles - and a belief that, despite having a better average than many of his competitors, he was still definitely aging (although younger than Gooch) - kept David Gower out of the side: but at the younger end of the scale, two highly regarded newcomers were coming through. Graeme Hick, Zimbabwean-born and having gone through a long residency qualification, had not only been breaking records all over the place in county cricket, but had thumped a magnificent 172* off the full West Indian attack for Worcestershire the only time he had faced them in 1988, was now qualified for England, and was rushed into the side: and not far behind his county record, came Mark Ramprakash of Middlesex. In the one-day matches they would be joined by Neil Fairbrother, regarded as a brilliant specialist in the shorter format but not quite technically sound enough for Tests. Jack Russell, equally eccentric in manners and mannerisms both on and off the pitch, was widely thought of as one of the best wicket-keepers in the world, as well as being a more than handy nuisance with the bat: an alternative wicketkeeper was Alec Stewart, not as fine a keeper but a good enough batsman to be selected for that alone. For bowling, the picture was considerably less clear: especially because Angus Fraser, far and away England's best bowler of the past two years, had broken down injured on the winter tour of Australia, and would miss the series (and indeed the next two years). Devon Malcolm, as fast a bowler as any of the West Indians but not always reliably accurate - perhaps best compared to Patterson - had mostly cemented a place in the team, although he was being pushed hard for it by the bulky David Lawrence of Gloucestershire - both being regarded as sufficiently risky that there was not room for both in the team. England, unlike West Indies, would at least consider selecting a specialist spin bowler, and the choice was between two slow left-armers: Phil Tufnell who had bowled well in his debut series but had severe off-pitch disciplinary issues, and moreover was a hopeless batsman and fielder, or Richard Illingworth, who spun the ball less but was more accurate on the pitch and reliable off it, and moreover was a fine enough lower-order batsman to have scored first-class centuries. The lively fast-medium swing of Phil DeFreitas had made him a first choice pick in English conditions: Chris Lewis was of similar repute, but untried, as a bowler with pretensions to batting, while the military-medium of Derek Pringle had slowed down recently but become more accurate, and Steve Watkin of Glamorgan had been taking wickets by the hatful in county cricket. The trouble was, as usual, deciding which of them deserved a place above the others, all being good but few having made a truly compelling claim to a permanent position. And waiting in the wings was that old warhorse of an all-rounder Ian Botham, now portly, aging and far slower than he had been, out of the team for two years, but still wanting one last crack at the only team he had never really done himself justice against.

== Recent form ==
After the disasters of the 1988 and 1989 home series against West Indies and Australia, and the loss of a squad of players to the rebel 1989 tour of South Africa, England had rebuilt under Gooch. The 1989-90 tour of the West Indies had surprised everybody, because England won the first match, and were denied a 2-0 lead only by poor light and flagrant time-wasting in the Third Test, before two heavy West Indian victories in the last two matches turned the series around (and even in the first of those, they left it late, a draw having looked odds-on before a brilliant spell by Ambrose in the final session.) England's home summer of 1990 had seen 1-0 victories over India and New Zealand, with Gooch's own batting being particularly magnificent, and Atherton's emergence not far behind. Fraser and Malcolm had been stars with the ball. The 1990-1 Ashes tour of Australia had seen a significant reversal of fortune, with Fraser lost to injury, Malcolm losing his accuracy when asked to bowl long spells in an attack that was one man light, regular middle-order batting collapses undoing good starts, Gower (despite two centuries) and the promising John Morris jettisoned for off-pitch issues: and even the promising start of Tufnell in which his bowling nearly won the 3rd Test at Sydney was undone by disciplinary shortcomings. But still, England expected a better showing back at home. And in one-day matches, they were heavy favourites to beat the Windies, whose form in ODIs had not matched their Test form for several years now: while England had been capable of beating any team in ODIs even when their Test team was falling apart, and were among the favourites for the next winter's World Cup in Australia and New Zealand.

West Indies, meanwhile, had some creaking at the seams. After the surprisingly narrow victory over England in 1989-90, they had toured Pakistan and finished with their third successive 1-1 series draw against those opponents, followed by a 2-1 home victory over Australia in the months after the Ashes series. But some players had trouble with form, others with fitness, others with discipline: Gordon Greenidge, already saying that the England tour would be his last, almost didn't make the tour, a long spell of poor form with the bat resulting in talk of dropping him, but he saved his place with a double-century in the second innings of the 4th Test against Australia. Ian Bishop, just on the point of making the fourth fast-bowling position his own, broke down injured, missed the Australian series, worked hard to get himself fit for the England tour but broke down injured again: and there were even suggestions that Richards himself was playing more on his past than his present. And while Lara with the bat, and Bishop with the ball - if he could keep fit - were undeniably the class of the next generation, and there were other fine batsmen who had to be left behind, the cupboard was beginning to look a little threadbare for other replacements with the ball and particularly with the keeper's gloves. Nevertheless, West Indies *had* beaten Australia, who had beaten England, so they had some reason to be confident, and they at least were more settled in the choice of their first team than England.

== ODI series ==
=== 1st ODI ===
23, 24 May 1991
Scorecard

West Indies; 173/8 (55 overs)	v	England; 175/9 (49.4 overs)
IVA Richards 30 (45); IT Botham 4/45 (11 overs)		MA Atherton 69* (147); CL Hooper 2/18 (2.4 overs)

England won by 1 wicket
Edgbaston, Birmingham
Umpires: JH Hampshire and MJ Kitchen
Player of the match: MA Atherton (ENG)

- England won the toss and elected to field.
- Reserve day used. England were 98/4 (27 overs) at the close of the first day.
- GA Hick and RK Illingworth (both ENG) made their ODI debuts.

The ODI series began, in the first match at Edgbaston, with England handing a recall to the aging Ian Botham - a reward for a magnificent 161* against them for Worcestershire in the county match. Hick made his debut, and Fairbrother a recall, with the bat. For the West Indies, Haynes was injured and missed the entire ODI series, Greenidge opening with Simmons. The latter was dismissed quickly: and when Botham came on to bowl, he wrecked the West Indies' batting with his best bowling figures in ODIs of 4/45 including the wicket of Richardson in his first over. DeFreitas, Lewis, Pringle, Illingworth (on debut) and even Gooch backed him up superbly with the ball, Richards was the only man to reach 30, and it took some unlikely slogging from Walsh and Ambrose to raise a semi-respectable total of 173/8. In response, England looked set fair at 80/2 despite poor weather and bad light causing frequent delays, but Lamb and Fairbrother fell unexpectedly to Hooper before play was abandoned for the night, the match spilling into a second day. On that second day, Atherton played a lone hand with the bat for a magnificent 69*, as Botham tore a hamstring (he would miss the remaining ODIs and the first two Tests with this), unwisely carried on but was dismissed next ball, and wickets fell in a procession at the other end till Atherton was left with last man Illingworth and 20 runs still to get. But Windies' bowling strategy betrayed them: as usual, they had selected four specialist bowlers for 11 overs each, and looked to have part-timers make up the remaining 11 overs. And the specialist bowlers threw everything they could at Atherton and Illingworth, but could not break through, and with 48 overs gone, the four specialists had bowled their maximum 44 and Richards had to turn to his part-timers to finish. Shortly afterwards, Illingworth hit the winning boundary and showed the value of a no. 11 batsman who had scored first-class centuries.

=== 2nd ODI ===
25 May 1991
Scorecard

England; 270/4 (55 overs)	v	West Indies; 261 (55 overs)
MA Atherton 74 (123); CEL Ambrose 2/36 (11 overs)		IVA Richards 78 (84); CC Lewis 3/62 (11 overs)

England won by 9 runs
Old Trafford, Manchester
Umpires: HD Bird and DR Shepherd
Player of the match: AJ Lamb (ENG)

- West Indies won the toss and elected to field.
- MR Ramprakash (ENG) made his ODI debut.
- Gordon Greenidge played his last ODI match.

In the second match at Old Trafford, the injured Botham was replaced by Mark Ramprakash, for his debut: with Gooch taking Botham's place with an 11-over spell with the ball. Ramprakash was expected to strengthen the batting, but had little chance to bat, coming in only in the last couple of overs, as Gooch, Atherton and Lamb all scored fifties in England's 270/4, Lamb's being the fastest. West Indies fell nine runs short: many of their batsmen getting in, but only two, Hooper (48) and Richards (78) passing 30. All England's bowlers contributed: only Illingworth missed out on a wicket, but was the most economical. Greenidge had sustained an injury after the match began, but before West Indies batted: he came in at number 8 but failed to achieve anything in what would be his last ever international match, Dujon joining Simmons as makeshift opener.

=== 3rd ODI ===
27 May 1991
Scorecard

West Indies; 264/9 (55 overs)	v	England; 265/3 (46.1 overs)
AL Logie 82 (99); DV Lawrence 4/67 (11 overs)		NA Fairbrother 113 (109); MD Marshall 1/49 (11 overs)

England won by 7 wickets
Lord's, London
Umpires: MJ Kitchen and DR Shepherd
Player of the match: NA Fairbrother (ENG)

- England won the toss and elected to field.
- DV Lawrence and DA Reeve (both ENG) made their ODI debuts.
- Viv Richards played his last ODI match.

West Indies fared better with the bat in the third match at Lord's - only the makeshift Simmons/Dujon opening partnership failed outright, Lara coming in during the middle order to replace Greenidge. Logie, however, was the batting hero with 82. England, meanwhile, rested Lamb and dropped Lewis, bringing in all-rounder Dermot Reeve and fast bowler David Lawrence. The latter, true to his reputation and previous form, was expensive (67 runs) but took four wickets as Windies reached 264/9. In response, England won at a canter despite the early dismissals of Gooch and Atherton, as Fairbrother (113) and Hick (86*) knocked off the runs almost without breaking a sweat, with nearly ten overs to spare. Once again Ramprakash managed to get onto the field but only for a few minutes, not even facing one ball this time as Hick smashed the winning runs.

== Test series ==
=== 1st Test ===
6 – 10 June 1991
(5–day match)
Scorecard

England	v	West Indies
198 (79.2 overs); RA Smith 54 (88); MD Marshall 3/46 (13 overs)		173 (54.1 overs); IVA Richards 73 (98); PAJ DeFreitas 4/34 (17.1 overs)
252 (106 overs); GA Gooch 154* (331); CEL Ambrose 6/52 (28 overs)		162 (56.4 overs); RB Richardson 68 (141); PAJ DeFreitas 4/59 (21 overs)

England won by 115 runs
Headingley, Leeds
Umpires: HD Bird and DR Shepherd
Player of the match: GA Gooch (ENG)

- West Indies won the toss and elected to field.
- GA Hick, MR Ramprakash and SL Watkin (all ENG) made their Test debuts.

In the early season, up at Headingley in Yorkshire, with plenty of rain and overcast conditions forecast, it was to nobody's surprise that neither side selected a spinner. England gave Test debuts to Hick and Ramprakash: dropping Fairbrother, who had been pigeonholed as an ODI player, made room for the return of Robin Smith who had missed the ODI series. Devon Malcolm returned to the bowling attack, joining Pringle and DeFreitas, and a debut was also handed to Steve Watkin, it being thought that the conditions would suit the tall seam-up Glamorgan bowler (and he was the closest like-for-like replacement for Fraser, for whom this pitch could have been tailor-made had he not been out with his long-term injury.) For Windies, Haynes was fit to return as opener, while Greenidge's injury forced him to return home, Simmons taking over permanently as Haynes's opening partner. The rest of the team largely picked itself, with the only doubt being whether the young and promising Lara would get a chance at the expense of Logie: but the latter had long since established his credentials in English conditions.

On a pitch and weather conditions clearly favouring the bowlers, with multiple interruptions forecast (correctly) over all five days, England won the toss and batted first - reasoning that, awkward though things seemed, they would likely get worse rather than better. Atherton, Hick and Lamb all fell early: Gooch was soon to join them, though having shown more aggression, he had scored over 30. Ramprakash, on debut, hung around obdurately for 27, while Smith put together a fine half-century to rescue England from a precarious position before being narrowly run-out for 54. Some late resistance from Pringle and DeFreitas saw England reach 174/7 at the close, and 198 all out on the second day: a total which looked very small when Simmons took off like a tornado, clouting boundaries off both Malcolm and Watkin. The latter, however, got rid of a strangely out-of-sorts Haynes, and then DeFreitas and Pringle came on and brought the scoring rate down. Ramprakash pulled off a spectacular catch in the gully to get rid of Simmons, then an equally spectacular run-out to dismiss Hooper: Richardson was also run out, unwisely going for a third: and thereafter only Richards offered any resistance with a quickfire 73 as Windies collapsed to 166/8 at the end of an interrupted second day. They closed at 173 all out on day 3, giving England a slender first-innings lead - one which looked insignificant when England lost their first three wickets even faster than they had on the first day. Gooch and Ramprakash (27) steadied the ship with a fine partnership of 78, but then the next three wickets - Ramprakash, Smith (first ball) and Russell fell for only eight more runs, all six wickets having fallen to Ambrose. England finished the third day on a precarious 143/6.

The fourth day, although the most shortened of all by rain, was the crucial day of the match. At one end were England's tail-enders, desperately clinging on for their lives: at the other end was Gooch, sublimely biffing the bowling around as if it was a sunny late August day at The Oval rather than a rainy early June at Headingley. Pringle, the other not-out overnight batsmen, could hardly get a run but managed to hang in there for ages - of the 98-run partnership, his share was 27, matching Ramprakash for second top score (no other batsman got more than 6). After Pringle finally fell, the last three hung around long enough for Gooch to add 30 more to the score: when England were all out for 252, Gooch had carried his bat for a magnificent 154 not out - rated as one of the finest innings of all time both for the quality of the bowling, the state of the weather and pitch, the context of the match at the time, and the comparison to how the other batsmen in the innings had fared, Gooch's share being among the highest percentage shares by a single batsman of a completed innings. There was just time for West Indies to bat a couple of overs before the close: and they began disastrously, Simmons chopping his first ball straight on to his stumps.

The final day dawned with West Indies needing 267 more runs to win, or, more realistically, rain to save a draw in those conditions. Haynes and Richardson started promisingly, but after the former fell to Pringle, Watkin took out the middle order with three wickets in three overs, and only Dujon's 33 joined Richardson's 68 in offering further resistance. Halfway through the afternoon session, Walsh skied a delivery from Malcolm, Atherton took a running catch, and England were 1-0 up in the series. Gooch's 154* made him obvious man of the match: DeFreitas, with four wickets in each innings, was pick of the bowlers.

=== 2nd Test ===
20 – 24 June 1991
(5–day match)
Scorecard

West Indies	v	England
419 (120.1 overs); CL Hooper 111 (202); DR Pringle 5/100 (35.1 overs)		354 (118 overs); RA Smith 148* (271); CEL Ambrose 4/87 (34 overs)
12/2 (5.5 overs); DL Haynes 4* (18); PAJ DeFreitas 1/1 (3 overs)

Match drawn
Lord's, London
Umpires: BJ Meyer and KE Palmer
Player of the match: RA Smith (ENG)

- West Indies won the toss and elected to bat.
- There was no play on the fourth day.
- IBA Allen (WIN) made his Test debut.

England were unchanged for the Second Test at Lords, and only one change was made by the Windies: Patterson having sustained an injury, West Indies replaced him with debutant Ian Allen. It was clear that the Windies had been severely rattled by their defeat in the opening match, and were up for a fight: and they certainly showed it. Meanwhile, the very differing conditions at Lords suggested that England would have done better to drop one of their medium pacers for a spinner, although the argument of keeping a winning team together was raised. West Indies came out of the blocks like a train, bashing their way to 317/3 on the first day with Haynes, Richardson, Hooper and Richards all passing 50: England's only bright spot being an unexpected bonus from the occasional off-spin of Hick, dismissing Simmons in his first over right on the stroke of lunch, and Richardson near the end of the second session. After a start like that, things could only get better for England, and they did: although Hooper reached his century, nobody else offered much resistance to Pringle's five-for on the second day, and England felt they had been handed a lifeline by restricting the Windies to "only" 419 by lunch.

This was put very much in perspective only a few overs later, when Atherton, Hick and Lamb all failed again, leaving England at 16 for 3. Once again Ramprakash ground his way to the mid-twenties but failed to go further: and when Gooch was deceived by Walsh, offering no stroke to a delivery which seamed up the famous Lord's slope and took out his off stump, England were a disastrous 84/5. The Windies bowlers had their tails very much up, and threw everything they had at Smith and Russell: both struggled at first, but both hung on, to reach 110/5 by the end of the second day, barely half the way towards the follow-on target. The third day of the match saw Smith produce a heroic innings - particularly featuring his already-famous square cuts - to almost match Gooch's Headingley effort: again with obdurate support from the tail, who succeeded where the top order had failed. Russell continued to make 46, Pringle 35, DeFreitas 29, even Watkin hung around for ages for his 6, and when Malcolm finally fell, Smith was left on 148* and England's total of 354 was much closer to the Windies' first innings than anyone had had any right to expect. When West Indies in turn crashed to 12 for 2, now just 77 runs ahead, the position was pretty much level with all to play for, but the last two days of the match were washed out by persistent rain and the game finished as a draw. To nobody's surprise, Smith was named Man of the Match.

=== 3rd Test ===
4 – 9 July 1991
(5–day match)
Scorecard

England	v	West Indies
300 (103.5 overs); GA Gooch 68 (110); CEL Ambrose 5/74 (34 overs)		397 (118.1 overs); IVA Richards 80 (155); PAJ DeFreitas 3/67 (31.1 overs)
211 (79 overs); PAJ DeFreitas 55* (86); CA Walsh 4/64 (24 overs)		115/1 (32.2 overs); DL Haynes 57* (97); DV Lawrence 1/61 (12.2 overs)

West Indies won by 9 wickets
Trent Bridge, Nottingham
Umpires: JH Hampshire and MJ Kitchen
Player of the match: CEL Ambrose (WIN)

- England won the toss and elected to bat.
- 7 July was taken as a rest day.
- RK Illingworth (ENG) made his Test debut.

West Indies were unchanged for the Third Test, at Trent Bridge. England made two changes: the first was to replace Malcolm, who had misfired erratically in both previous tests, with Lawrence - also fast and sometimes erratic, but he had at least taken wickets in the ODI. The other was to drop Watkin, who had been spanked all over Lord's, by selecting the first specialist spinner of the series: and, thanks partly to his being seen as more reliable - and the fact that the West Indies had a reputation for being more vulnerable to the ball turning away than turning in, which had been previously exploited by such as Qadir, Hirwani and even Border - the spot was given to Richard Illingworth. They had also considered recalling Botham, fit again after his torn hamstring in the first ODI, but it was not clear who was to be left out to replace him: in any event he saved them the bother by getting injured again and being unavailable for both this match and the next.

England batted first: and this time their top three did not let them down. Hick with 43 made his best score of the series, Atherton's 32 was at least adequate, and both Gooch and Smith passed 60. Lamb, unfortunately, failed again, as did Ramprakash for once, and the tail were unable to repeat their heroics of previous matches, England closing at a round 300 with five wickets to Ambrose. In response, once again West Indies were batting right on the stroke of lunch: once again the ball was thrown to a spinner for the last over before lunch: and once again Simmons was the victim of a spinner's first over, in fact Illingworth's very first delivery in Tests. Lawrence and DeFreitas also took wickets, West Indies were 118/4, and England were looking optimistically at the chance of a lead. However Richards and Logie batted superbly, scoring 80 and 87 respectively: both fell before the England score was overtaken, but Marshall also got in on the act, spanking a quickfire 67 from number eight in the order. The rest of the Windies tail supported him, and England's dreams of a lead faced instead the reality of a deficit of 97.

This seemed to knock the morale right out of England - all their batting collapsed at once, to 115/8. Lamb made his own highest score of the series: unfortunately it was only 29, and even more unfortunately, no other Englishman was able to match it - at least, not until some unexpected late-order slogging from DeFreitas (55), obduracy from Illingworth (13) and more slogging from Lawrence (34). A score of 211 and target of 115 was never going to be enough, and although Lawrence dismissed the hapless Simmons with his first ball, he was hit all around the ground by Haynes and Richardson who knocked off the runs with no further loss. Ambrose, with eight wickets in the match, was named Man of the Match.

=== 4th Test ===
25 – 28 July 1991
(5–day match)
Scorecard

England	v	West Indies
188 (70.4 overs); GA Gooch 45 (79); MD Marshall 4/33 (12.4 overs)		292 (107.3 overs); RB Richardson 104 (229); CC Lewis 6/111 (35 overs)
255 (105.4 overs); CC Lewis 65 (94); BP Patterson 5/81 (31 overs)		157/3 (40.4 overs); IVA Richards 73* (97); PAJ DeFreitas 3/54 (13 overs)

West Indies won by 7 wickets
Edgbaston, Birmingham
Umpires: B Dudleston and DR Shepherd
Player of the match: RB Richardson (WIN)

- West Indies won the toss and elected to field.
- The match was scheduled for five days but completed in four.
- H Morris (ENG) made his Test debut.

If the Third Test had seen England crash from a promising start, the Fourth saw an awful start, a couple of attempts to retrieve the situation, only to crash again. Smith, who had been batting at six, had sustained an injury in between the Third and Fourth tests: England's response was to drop Atherton down a place in the order - he had looked uncharacteristically fragile this series - also moving Hick, Lamb and Ramprakash down a place, and bring in Glamorgan's opener Hugh Morris for a Test debut (had Smith been fit, Morris would still have played, Lamb would have been dropped instead.) Lawrence was dropped to 12th man to make a place for Chris Lewis, another tall fast bowler with pretensions to all-rounder status. For West Indies, they were able to reverse the change they had been forced into at Lords, Patterson being fit again, and returning to replace Allen. England crashed to 188 all out: only Gooch (45) and Ramprakash (29, his own highest score) passing 20. West Indies, in return, passed England's score with only three wickets down, and reached 253/4 by the end of the second day, the pick of the batsmen being Richardson with a fine century. Even more worryingly, DeFreitas - pick of England's bowlers so far in the series - sustained an injury halfway through an over, was unable to complete it, and limped off.

Chris Lewis tried to inspire a fightback: both overnight batsmen fell quickly to his bowling the next morning, as did the rest of the West Indies, Lewis finishing with six wickets, West Indies on 292. But England, in turn, were wrecked by the returning Patterson, bowling as fast as he had ever bowled, and for once adding gun-barrel accuracy to his pace. England were smashed to 5/3, then 94/5 (Gooch out for 40) and finally 145/8. For a second time Lewis, coming in at number 10, attempted a one-man fightback, smashing his way to 65: and again, as he had done so often this series, Pringle was able to hold out obdurately at the other end when he had someone to support, and made 45. These last two plus Illingworth between them added over a hundred to the score, turning a walkover target into a potentially tricky 152 on a pitch which was becoming itself increasingly tricky: then DeFreitas, bowling despite his injury, blew away three West Indians for 24 runs, and it was game on. He could not bowl at both ends, nor for long as the earlier injury continued to bother him: Pringle's earlier accuracy in the series deserted him, Lewis was unable to replicate his own first-innings heroics, and Illingworth's consistency also left him, Hooper and Richards finishing the job without further loss. Richards rubbed salt into the wound, finishing the match by belting Illingworth for six when only one run was needed, while Richardson's first innings century gave him the match award.

=== 5th Test ===
8 – 12 August 1991
(5–day match)
Scorecard

England	v	West Indies
419 (151.1 overs); RA Smith 109 (256); CEL Ambrose 3/83 (36 overs)		176 (57.3 overs); DL Haynes 75* (198); PCR Tufnell 6/25 (14.3 overs)
146/5 (31.4 overs); AJ Stewart 38* (50); BP Patterson 2/63 (9 overs)		385 (f/o) (132.5 overs); RB Richardson 121 (312); DV Lawrence 5/106 (25.5 overs)

England won by 5 wickets
The Oval, London
Umpires: JW Holder and MJ Kitchen
Player of the match: RA Smith (ENG)

- England won the toss and elected to bat.
- CB Lambert (WIN) made his Test debut.
- Viv Richards played his last test match.

Both sides had to make changes for the 5th test. Logie - whom some said was lucky to have been playing anyway - had sustained an injury towards the end of the 4th test. Unfortunately for the West Indies, Brian Lara - the reserve batsman in the squad - had also been injured shortly before the match. As a consequence, their replacement batsman was the unlikely figure of Clayton Lambert, who had not even been in the initial squad, but had been belatedly called up after Logie's injury simply because he was playing professional league cricket in England at the time and had made an ODI debut a couple of years previously. England made more changes, not just in personnel but in formation since they decided to play five specialist bowlers, owing to the need to bowl Windies out twice if they were to win the match and draw the series. Morris was retained, despite his double failure on debut, but Lamb and Hick both belatedly paid the price for their poor form in the series and were axed for Smith's return - Smith being promoted up the order. Jack Russell, too, was dropped - while his wicket keeping had been excellent, he had produced only one innings of substance with the bat, so for the first time (and, indeed, not the last) he was dropped in favour of an inferior keeper but superior batsman, Alec Stewart, who unlike Russell could bat in the top six. Botham finally returned to make an appearance in the Test series, as all-rounder batting at seven: Lawrence was recalled because it was felt that the faster pitch at The Oval might suit him: Tufnell replaced Illingworth in the spinner's position, since he was thought to be more attacking and mercurial than Illingworth, whose more containing role had proved somewhat anodyne. DeFreitas, Lewis and Pringle were fighting for two places between them: at first it was thought DeFreitas would miss out thanks to his injury at Edgbaston, but he had been England's most consistent bowler all series, and he made a full recovery - Pringle sustaining an injury himself and sparing the selectors the awkward choice between dropping him or Lewis.

England won the toss and batted. Gooch, as usual, got England off to a good start, and Morris managed to stay with him as England put on the only century opening partnership of the series. Both batsmen fell at once, quickly followed by Atherton, but Smith steadied the ship with his second century of the series. Ramprakash, Stewart, Botham and Lewis all put on decent scores in support - although Botham was dismissed in bizarre fashion, when he attempted to hook a short delivery from Ambrose, missed, was hit on the helmet, spun around, toppled towards his stumps, tried to hurdle them and didn't quite make it, to be out hit-wicket, sparking a famous commentary-box giggling fit between Brian Johnston and Jonathan Agnew involving the immortal phrase "he didn't quite manage to get his leg over". Even Lawrence got in on the act, hitting a boundary that somehow went straight over Dujon's head behind the stumps: England finished on 419, matching the Windies' effort at Lords as the highest team total of the series. Viv Richards, in the field, was meanwhile forced to leave the pitch twice for treatment - the first time owing to a bee sting, the second time for a migraine.

West Indies began solidly, despite the now-customary early dismissal of Simmons. Botham almost repeated his own now-customary trick of taking a wicket in the first over of a comeback, but the catch offered by Desmond Haynes was dropped at slip. He could not be kept down for long, though, and removed the dangerous Richardson early on the third morning. West Indies' lucky debutant, Lambert, came in at five, and breezily bashed the ball around for 39 off 49 deliveries, West Indies seeming set for a solid response at 158/3. Then everything changed as Tufnell came on to bowl: Lambert, with an almighty slog that would probably have gone straight into the nearby gasometer or possibly over it had he connected properly, instead whacked the ball almost straight up in the air. Ramprakash was waiting when it came out of orbit: 158/4. The remaining wickets collapsed in a heap, mostly to the delighted Tufnell, most of them off wild, eyes-off-the-ball slogs, leaving the astonished Haynes carrying his bat for 75 not out at the other end. At 176 all-out, England had no hesitation in asking the West Indies to follow on, 243 behind.

Windies batted much more responsibly second time around, to their credit. Botham took the first two wickets (Simmons and the promoted Lambert), Lawrence disposed of Haynes, but was thereafter somewhat wayward, and was well punished by Richardson, Hooper and Richards for his pains. So too was Tufnell, on whom Hooper was particularly severe: although Tufnell had the last laugh in that particular contest when Hooper hit him straight at Gooch to be out for 54. But he was far more expensive in this innings - his previous 6/25 having to contrast with 1/150 this time round. Richards, needing 20 to preserve a career batting average of 50 at his retirement, made 60, and received three standing ovations - one when he got to 21, another for his fifty, and the biggest of all as he left the ground for the last time, dismissed by Lawrence. Dujon also fell cheaply to Lawrence for the second time in the match - with the assistance of a distraction from an annoyingly persistent pigeon, which refused to leave the playing surface - and West Indies finished day 4 on 356/6, Richardson having scored a century and Marshall, potentially dangerous, on 17. However, Marshall went in the first over next morning: Lawrence and DeFreitas polished off the tail - Lawrence finally getting his revenge on Richardson too, and finishing with his first international five-wicket haul, one which confirmed all that was already known about him, that he was wayward and sometimes expensive but had the knack of dismissing good batsmen.

The Windies' final total of 385 left England chasing a comparatively innocuous-looking 143 to chase, on the best batting pitch of the series. It looked easy, but of course the West Indies had other ideas: Morris and Atherton both fell quite cheaply, Gooch and Smith steadied the ship but fell for 29 and 26 respectively, and 80/4 looked worryingly shaky on the scorecard. But Stewart came in and showed no fear, with 38* off 50 balls, and the scores were level when Richards threw the ball to the luckless Lambert to concede the winning runs. There was time for one final twist in the tale, though, as Ramprakash missed a straight delivery and was LBW, leaving Botham to come in and hit the winning runs off the next delivery - and his only international Test victory over the Windies, since he had been left out of the 1989/90 tour and had missed the Headingley match earlier this year. Somehow they just couldn't keep him out of the headlines. Smith's century gave him the match award: Gooch's consistent batting made him England's Man of the Series, and Ambrose's 28 wickets gave him the same award for the WI.
