= Ian Allen (cricketer) =

West Indian cricketer (born 1965)

Cricket information
- Batting: Right-handed
- Bowling: Right-arm fast-medium

International information
- National side: West Indies
- Test debut: 20 June 1991 v England
- Last Test: 4 July 1991 v England

Career statistics
Competition	Test	First-class
Matches	2	46
Runs scored	5	506
Batting average	–	11.76
100s/50s	0/0	0/0
Top score	4*	36
Balls bowled	282	6,606
Wickets	5	98
Bowling average	36.00	38.11
5 wickets in innings	0	2
10 wickets in match	0	0
Best bowling	2/69	7/48
Catches/stumpings	1/–	18/–
- Source: CricInfo, 31 October 2022

Ian Basil Alston Allen (born 6 October 1965) is a former West Indian international cricketer who played in two Test matches in 1991.

Allen played for the Windward Islands, and his two Test matches came on the West Indies tour of England in 1991. He made his debut at Lord's against England as a replacement for Patrick Patterson. He took five wickets in total in his two Tests, his most important intervention coming at Trent Bridge when he ended a troublesome second-innings last-wicket stand by dismissing David Lawrence. The West Indies went on to win the match to draw level in the Test series, although Allen then lost his place when Patterson returned from injury.

After playing Allen was reported to be interested in the post of West Indies coach in 2007. Later he coached the Windward Islands.
