= Rupert Scotland =

Antiguan-born Bermudian cricketer (1937–2012)

Personal information
- Full name: Irving Rupert Desmond Scotland
- Born: 2 September 1937; Antigua
- Died: 7 June 2012 (aged 74); Bermuda
- Batting: Right-handed
- Bowling: Right-arm medium
- Relatives: Cleon Scotland (son)

Domestic team information
- Years: Team
- 1971/72: Bermuda
- 1958: Leeward Islands

Career statistics
| Competition | First-class |
|---|---|
| Matches | 2 |
| Runs scored | 137 |
| Batting average | 34.25 |
| 100s/50s | –/1 |
| Top score | 72 |
| Balls bowled | – |
| Wickets | – |
| Bowling average | – |
| 5 wickets in innings | – |
| 10 wickets in match | – |
| Best bowling | – |
| Catches/stumpings | –/– |
- Source: CricketArchive, 13 October 2011

Irving Rupert Desmond Scotland (2 September 1937 – 7 June 2012) was an Antiguan-born Bermudian cricketer. He was a right-handed batsman and a right-arm medium pace bowler.

He played the inaugural first-class match for the Leeward Islands, against Jamaica in 1958, and later played in the inaugural first-class match for Bermuda, against New Zealand in 1972. It was the maiden first-class match to be played by the Bermuda cricket team.

He died following a long illness on 7 June 2012. His son Cleon Scotland played List A cricket for Bermuda.
