= Latchman Bhansingh =

Guyanese cricketer

Personal information
- Born: 26 November 1966 (age 59); Bartica, Guyana
- Batting: Left-handed
- Bowling: Slow left-arm orthodox
- Role: All-rounder

International information
- National side: Canada (1994–1997)

Domestic team information
- Years: Team
- 1985–1989: Berbice

Career statistics
Competition	FC	LA
Matches	2	6
Runs scored	36	89
Batting average	9.00	22.25
100s/50s	0/0	0/0
Top score	18	45
Balls bowled	30	14
Wickets	0	0
Bowling average	n/a	n/a
5 wickets in innings	0	0
10 wickets in match	0	n/a
Best bowling	0/8	0/2
Catches/stumpings	2/–	0/–
- Source: CricketArchive, 7 April 2015

Latchman Bhansingh (born 26 November 1966) is a former Canadian international cricketer. He was born in Guyana, and began his career in Guyanese domestic cricket, playing two first-class games for Berbice. After emigrating to Canada, he represented the Canadian national side at several tournaments in the 1990s.

== Career in Guyana ==
Born in Bartica, Bhansingh captained Guyana's under-19 side at two West Indies Youth Championships, in 1985 (when Guyana won the title) and in 1986. His under-19 teammates included Carl Hooper, a future captain of both Guyana and the West Indies, and Sudesh Dhaniram, a future United States international. Playing for Berbice despite being born in Essequibo, Bhansingh made his first-class debut for them in the final of the 1985–86 Guystac Trophy, less than a month before his 19th birthday. A left-handed top-order batsman and occasional left-arm orthodox spinner, he scored 3 and 10 against Demerara, and failed to take a wicket from his three overs. Bhansingh's second and final first-class game for Berbice came in the 1989–90 final of the same tournament (renamed the Sookram Memorial Trophy). He again had very little impact on the game, which was the last final to have first-class status.

== Career in Canada ==
After emigrating to Canada, Bhansingh made his international debut for the Canadian national team in September 1994, in what was then the annual match against the United States. In the following year's fixture, he was man of the match, scoring 73 and 88 and taking two wickets. He had earlier appeared for Toronto and Ontario representative teams. During the 1996–97 West Indian season, Canada were invited to participate in the Shell/Sandals Trophy, the domestic one-day tournament. The tournament, which held List A status, featured teams outside the scope of the West Indies Cricket Board (WICB) for the first time, with Canada and Bermuda the two invitational teams. Often used as one of Canada's opening batsmen (alongside either Alex Glegg or Ingleton Liburd), Bhansingh played in all six of the side's matches. His 89 runs were second only to Liburd (149) for Canada, with his highest score, 45, coming against Trinidad and Tobago.

Bhansingh's second and final major tournament for Canada was the 1997 ICC Trophy in Malaysia, which was the qualifying tournament for the 1999 World Cup. Aged 31, he played in five of Canada's seven matches – four in the group stages and the seventh-place playoff against Hong Kong. He finished with 76 runs for the tournament, with more than half of these coming in a single innings, 40 not out against Fiji. Bhansingh's left-arm spin was also used on several occasions, with his 10 overs yielding four wickets, including 3/13 against Hong Kong.
