= Alex Glegg =

Canadian former cricketer (born 1971)

Personal information
- Full name: Alexander Kenneth Lindsay Glegg
- Born: 9 August 1971 (age 55); Rhodesia
- Batting: Right-handed
- Role: Wicket-keeper

International information
- National side: Canada (1996–1997)
- Source: CricketArchive, 7 April 2015

Alexander Kenneth Lindsay Glegg (born 9 August 1971) is a Canadian former cricketer. He represented the Canadian national side in several competitions during the 1990s.

Born in Rhodesia (present-day Zimbabwe), Glegg made his List A debut for Canada in October 1996, during the 1996–97 Shell/Sandals Trophy (the West Indian domestic one-day competition). The tournament featured teams outside the scope of the West Indies Cricket Board (WICB) for the first time, with Canada and Bermuda participating as invitational teams. Glegg, a right-handed wicket-keeper, featured in the last four of Canada's six games, missing out on the first two matches (against Jamaica and Trinidad and Tobago). However, he was only wicket-keeper for the final match, against the Leeward Islands, with Shiv Seeram instead used as the team's primary keeper. Glegg opened the batting in every match he played, with his opening partners including Latchman Bhansingh (one game), the team's captain Ingleton Liburd (two games), and Brian Rajadurai (one game). His best performance came against Trinidad and Tobago, when he scored 37 before being bowled by West Indies international Phil Simmons. Against Jamaica, he and Liburd put on a 69-run opening stand, while on debut against the Leeward Islands he was the only Canadian top-order batsman to pass double figures, with the side bowled out for 74.

Glegg's next appearances for Canada came at the 1997 ICC Trophy, played in Malaysia in March and April. With Danny Ramnarais preferred as wicket-keeper, he played in only two matches, against East and Central Africa in the group stages and against Hong Kong in the seventh-place playoff. Glegg's batting performances (opening with Latchman Bhasingh and Desmond Chumney) were lacklustre, but he recorded three dismissals in each game, with three stumpings effected (off three different bowlers). One of the batsmen he stumped was Hong Kong's Rahul Sharma, an ex-Ranji Trophy and future ODI player. Glegg's last recorded matches for Canada came in October 1997, at the 1997–98 Red Stripe Bowl (the renamed Shell/Sandals Trophy). Featuring in all four of Canada's matches, he twice recorded ducks, against Guyana and the Leeward Islands. However, against Guyana in the quarter-final (in what was to be his last list-A match), he scored 47 runs coming in fifth in the batting order, his highest list-A score. This included a 105-run fourth-wicket partnership with Paul Prashad. Canada's wicket-keeper at its next international tournament, the 1998 Commonwealth Games, was Danny Ramnrais. Glegg remained involved in Canadian cricket after finishing his playing career, as evidenced by his role as match referee at a 2006 international fixture between the Bermudian and Canadian women's national sides, played in Victoria, British Columbia. His club cricket was played for the Meraloma Cricket Club, based in Vancouver.
