= Joseph Williams (Barbadian cricketer) =

Barbadian cricketer

Personal information
- Full name: Joseph Junior Williams
- Born: 1 September 1974 (age 52); Foul Bay, St Philip, Barbados
- Batting: Right-handed
- Bowling: Right-arm fast-medium
- Role: Bowler

Domestic team information
- Years: Team
- 1996–1997: Barbados

Career statistics
Competition	FC	LA
Matches	2	6
Runs scored	10	19
Batting average	10.00	6.33
100s/50s	0/0	0/0
Top score	10	7
Balls bowled	138	293
Wickets	3	8
Bowling average	19.00	31.50
5 wickets in innings	0	0
10 wickets in match	0	n/a
Best bowling	3/57	3/33
Catches/stumpings	0/-	1/-
- Source: CricketArchive, 5 June 2013

Joseph Henderson Williams (born 1 September 1974) is a former Barbadian cricketer who played several matches for Barbados during the late 1990s. From the parish of Saint Philip, Williams represented the Barbados under-19 team at both the 1993 and 1994 West Indies Youth Championships. He made his first-class debut for Barbados during the 1995–96 season, against Guyana in the Red Stripe Cup. The match was washed out after one day's play, and Williams played only one further match at first-class level, against a touring Free State team the following season. In that match, played at the Kensington Oval, Bridgetown, he took 3/57 in Free State's only innings, bowling first change behind Henry Austin and Test player Patterson Thompson.

Although he only played two matches at first-class level, Williams had greater success in the limited-overs format, playing six matches over the 1996–97 and 1997–98 seasons of the West Indian domestic one-day competition. He made his List A debut for Barbados against the Windward Islands in October 1996, taking one wicket on debut. In what was arguably his best performance for the team, Williams took 3/33 in the following match against Bermuda, helping to restrict the Bermudians to 215/8 from their 50 overs. His last one-day match for Barbados came against Guyana in October 1997, with his figures of 3/54 the best in the match. Williams did not play for Barbados again, finishing with eight wickets from his six limited-overs matches, alongside his three wickets from two first-class matches.
