= Nadeem Sheikh =

Canadian cricketer

Personal information
- Full name: Nadeem Z. H. Sheikh
- Born: 31 August 1969 (age 57); Edmonton, Alberta, Canada
- Batting: Right-handed
- Bowling: Right-arm medium-fast

Career statistics
Competition	List A
Matches	2
Runs scored	2
Batting average	–
100s/50s	–/–
Top score	2*
Balls bowled	120
Wickets	3
Bowling average	30.66
5 wickets in innings	–
10 wickets in match	–
Best bowling	2/46
Catches/stumpings	1/–
- Source: Cricinfo, 30 January 2022

Nadeem N.Z.H. Sheikh (born 31 August 1969) is a Canadian former cricketer.

Sheikh was born at Edmonton in August 1969.

He was first selected to the Canada Under 19 squad in 1987 and participated in the U19 World Cup hosted in England. He was part of the Canadian men's squad playing against visiting teams from 1988 to 1990. Then was a part of the Canadian squad for the 1997–98 Red Stripe Bowl, in which he played two List A one-day matches against Barbados and Guyana. Playing in the Canadian team as a medium-fast bowler, he took 3 wickets in his two matches, with best figures of 2 for 46. These List A matches for Canada marked his only appearances for the team. He later played in 20–over matches for Alberta in the 2008 Scotiabank National T20 Cricket Championship.
