= Cleon Scotland =

Former Bermudian Cricketer

Personal information
- Full name: Cleon Scotland
- Born: Unknown
- Batting: Unknown
- Relatives: Rupert Scotland (father)

Domestic team information
- Years: Team
- 1997/98–1998/99: Bermuda

Career statistics
Competition	List A
Matches	2
Runs scored	0
Batting average	0.00
100s/50s	–/–
Top score	0
Balls bowled	–
Wickets	–
Bowling average	–
5 wickets in innings	–
10 wickets in match	–
Best bowling	–
Catches/stumpings	1/–
- Source: Cricinfo, 26 March 2012

Cleon Scotland (date of birth unknown) is a former Bermudian cricketer. Scotland's batting style is unknown.

Scotland made two List A appearances for Bermuda, against Jamaica in the 1997–98 Red Stripe Bowl and Guyana in the 1998–99 Red Stripe Bowl, He batted twice, but was dismissed for ducks in both innings.

Outside of cricket Scotland worked as a travel agent, as well as writing children's books. His father Rupert Scotland played first-class cricket for Bermuda.
