= Muneeb Diwan =

Canadian cricket player

Personal information
- Born: 20 March 1972 (age 54); St. Stephen, New Brunswick, Canada
- Batting: Right-handed

International information
- National side: Canada

Domestic team information
- Years: Team
- 1994: Essex

Career statistics
Competition	First-class	List A
Matches	1	18
Runs scored	0	376
Batting average	0.00	20.88
100s/50s	0/0	1/1
Top score	0	130
Catches/stumpings	0/–	2/–
- Source: CricketArchive, 14 October 2011

Muneeb Diwan (born 20 March 1972) is a Canadian cricket player. He is a right-handed batsman.

He played first-class cricket for Essex in 1994 and played second XI cricket for them until 1996. He first represented Canada in the 1997 ICC Trophy, and went on to play for them in the 2001 ICC Trophy and 1998 Commonwealth Games, amongst other occasions.
