= Gregg Foggo =

Bermudian cricketer (born 1970)

Personal information
- Full name: Gregg Foggo
- Born: 29 July 1970 (age 56); Paget, Bermuda
- Batting: Unknown
- Bowling: Spinner

Domestic team information
- Years: Team
- 1997/98: Bermuda

Career statistics
Competition	List A
Matches	2
Runs scored	8
Batting average	–
100s/50s	–/–
Top score	8*
Balls bowled	41
Wickets	–
Bowling average	–
5 wickets in innings	–
10 wickets in match	–
Best bowling	–
Catches/stumpings	–/–
- Source: Cricinfo, 31 March 2013

Gregg Foggo (date of birth is Paget, Bermuda) is a former Bermudian cricketer. Foggo's batting and bowling styles are unknown.

Foggo made his debut for Bermuda in a List A match against Jamaica in the 1997/98 Red Stripe Bowl, with him making a further List A appearance in that tournament against the same opposition. He scored a total of 8 runs in his two List A matches, while with the ball he bowled a total of 6.5 overs without taking a wicket.
