= Donald Norford =

Bermudian cricketer

Personal information
- Full name: Donald Norford
- Born: Unknown
- Batting: Unknown
- Role: Wicket-keeper

Domestic team information
- Years: Team
- 1997/98: Bermuda

Career statistics
Competition	List A
Matches	4
Runs scored	22
Batting average	7.33
100s/50s	–/–
Top score	21
Balls bowled	–
Wickets	–
Bowling average	–
5 wickets in innings	–
10 wickets in match	–
Best bowling	–
Catches/stumpings	2/–
- Source: Cricinfo, 19 March 2012

Donald Norford (date of birth unknown) is a former Bermudian cricketer. Norford's batting style is unknown, though it is known he played as a wicket-keeper.

Norford made his debut for Bermuda in a List A match against Trinidad and Tobago in the 1997/98 Red Stripe Bowl, with him making three further List A appearances in that tournament, two against Jamaica and one against the Windward Islands. He scored a total of 22 runs in his four List A matches, at an average of 7.33 and a high score of 21.
