= Jan McInnis =

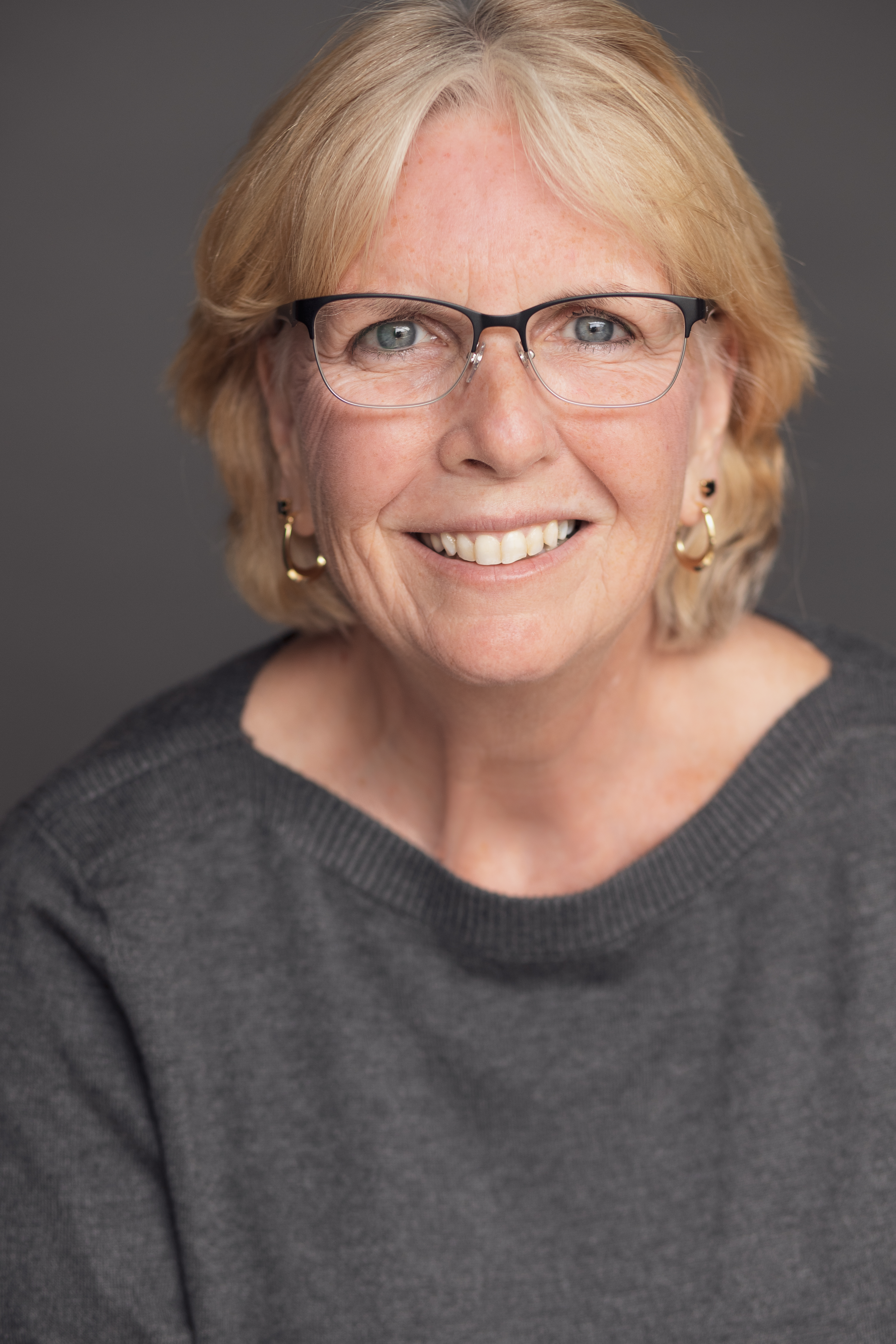
Keynote speaker, Comedian, Author

Jan McInnis is an American stand-up comedian, keynote speaker, author and comedy writer. McInnis specializes in comedy shows and humor keynotes for corporations, associations, and company events. Her act is clean and original, and it focuses on work (she spent 15 years as a marketing professional before comedy), family and day-to-day life. She has performed at hundreds of conferences and professional events, for groups such as the Mayo Clinic, Anthem, the Federal Reserve Bank of Atlanta, the American Bankers Association, and Pep Boys.

== Early life and education ==
McInnis was born in Washington, D.C., and grew up in Arlington, Virginia, before moving to Los Angeles in 2000. She graduated from Virginia Tech with a degree in Communications. She was a disk jockey (DJ) at Virginia Tech's punk rock radio station, and played the drums in the marching band. She went on to work for the National Ocean Service, the National Academy of Sciences on the original "Planet Earth" PBS television series, and several associations including a construction trade association and the Optical Society of America. She started her comedy career in 1994 working in comedy clubs throughout the county, and then moved into the convention market.

== Career ==
McInnis has been featured in the Wall Street Journal, the Washington Post, and the Huffington Post ]for her clean humor and her clean comedy writing. She has sold comedy material to radio stations, late night television, syndicated comic strips, greeting cards, and individuals. She was the Washington, D.C., winner for the HBO Stand-up, Stand-off comedy contest, and she has been featured on XM Satellite Radio, KLOS Five O-Clock Funnies and hundreds of other radio stations. At one point she had a weekly radio comedy bit titled "Cubicle Comedy from The Work Lady". In addition to her comedy show (titled Cubicle Comedy), she also offers 4 humor keynotes – Finding the Funny in Change, Finding the Funny in Communications and Flourishing From Failure: Handling Mistakes Like A Comedian. She is also a Master of Ceremonies and has hosted many events with her Hilarious Hosting. McInnis has also been a favorite entertainer at holiday parties throughout the country.

== Works ==
McInnis is author of two books: "Finding the Funny FAST: how to create quick humor to connect with clients, coworkers and crowds," and "Convention Comedian: Stories and Wisdom From Two Decades of Chicken Dinners and Comedy Clubs." She also has a weekly podcast titled Comedian Stories – Tales From the Road in Under 5 Minutes, and she is heard daily on Alexa Flash Briefings with her "Finding the Funny" flash briefing. She also has a podcast titled Comedian Stories: Tales From the Road in Under 5 Minutes, and a comedy writing blog.
