= Roger Blades =

Bermudian cricketer (1963–2022)

Personal information
- Full name: Roger Wayne Blades
- Born: 25 May 1963; Barbados
- Died: 16 February 2022 (aged 58); Bridgetown, Barbados
- Batting: Right-handed
- Bowling: Right-arm fast medium
- Role: Bowler

International information
- National side: Bermuda

Domestic team information
- Years: Team
- 1996/97–1997/98: Bermuda

Career statistics
Competition	List A
Matches	7
Runs scored	58
Batting average	9.66
100s/50s	–/–
Top score	27
Balls bowled	240
Wickets	5
Bowling average	36.00
5 wickets in innings	–
10 wickets in match	–
Best bowling	4/30
Catches/stumpings	–/–
- Source: CricketArchive, 13 October 2011

Roger Blades (25 May 1963 – 16 February 2022) was a Barbadian policeman and cricketer. He served in the Bermuda Police Service and represented the Bermuda national cricket team as a fast-medium bowler in the 1990s.

Blades attended Combermere School. He debuted for St Catherine in the Barbados Cricket Association (BCA) first division in 1982. He moved to Bermuda for work reasons in 1989 and joined the Police club. He also played for Somerset in the Cup Match between 1994 and 1996, making 58 on debut from ninth in the batting order. In the 1996 Cup Match, he notoriously sent St. George's batsmen Glenn Blakeney and Eugene Foggo to the hospital with head injuries inside the first hour of the match.

Blades played seven List A matches for Bermuda as part of the Red Stripe Bowl, and also represented them at the 1997 ICC Trophy. His best figures were 4/30 against the Windward Islands in the 1996 Red Stripe Bowl in Guyana.

In 1998 Blades returned to Barbados where he continued to play club cricket. He later worked for Barbados National Bank. He died at Queen Elizabeth Hospital, Bridgetown, on 16 February 2022 after a long illness.
