= Casper Davis =

Vincentian cricketer (born 1966)

Personal information
- Full name: Casper Andre Davis
- Born: 14 March 1966 (age 60); Saint Vincent
- Batting: Right-handed
- Bowling: Right-arm fast
- Role: Bowler

Domestic team information
- Years: Team
- 1991/92-1998/99: Windward Islands

Career statistics
Competition	First-class	List A
Matches	40	23
Runs scored	816	92
Batting average	15.11	8.36
100s/50s	0/1	0/0
Top score	54	20
Balls bowled	5,273	1,070
Wickets	100	31
Bowling average	27.44	23.06
5 wickets in innings	5	0
10 wickets in match	0	0
Best bowling	7/58	4/22
Catches/stumpings	20/–	10/–
- Source: Cricinfo, 8 April 2022

Casper Davis (born 14 March 1966) is a Vincentian cricketer who featured as a right arm fast bowler. He played in 40 first-class and 23 List A matches for the Windward Islands from 1991 to 1999. Davis picked up exactly 100 wickets at an average of 27.44 in his first class career.
