= Anthony Amory =

Bermudian cricketer

Personal information
- Full name: Anthony Amory
- Born: 1963 (age 62–63); Bermuda
- Batting: Left-handed
- Bowling: Unknown arm medium

International information
- National side: Bermuda

Domestic team information
- Years: Team
- 1997/98: Bermuda

Career statistics
Competition	List A
Matches	3
Runs scored	43
Batting average	14.33
100s/50s	–/–
Top score	39
Balls bowled	48
Wickets	1
Bowling average	36.00
5 wickets in innings	–
10 wickets in match	–
Best bowling	1/23
Catches/stumpings	1/–
- Source: CricketArchive, 19 March 2012

Anthony Amory (born 1963) is a former Bermudian cricketer. Amory was a left-handed batsman who bowled medium pace, though his bowling arm is unknown.

Amory made his debut for Bermuda in the 1990 ICC Trophy against Fiji, with him making four further appearances in that tournament, the last of which came against Israel. He later made his List A debut for Bermuda against Trinidad and Tobago in the 1997/98 Red Stripe Bowl, with him making two further List A appearances in that tournament against the Windward Islands and Jamaica. He scored a total of 43 runs in his three List A matches, at an average of 14.33 and a high score of 39. With the ball, he took a single wicket from eight overs bowled.
