= Uitvlugt Community Centre Ground =

Cricket and football ground in Uitvlugt, Guyana

Enmore Recreation Ground
- Interactive map of Enmore Recreation Ground

Ground information
- Location: Uitvlugt, Guyana
- Country: Guyana
- Coordinates: 6.8773°N 58.3242°W
- Establishment: c. 1960
- Capacity: 1,000

Team information
Guyana	(1999/00–2000)
- As of 22 April 2022; Source: Ground profile

The Uitvlugt Community Centre Ground is a cricket and football ground in Uitvlugt, Guyana.

== History ==
Located in the Essequibo Islands-West Demerara village of Uitvlugt, the ground first played host to top–level domestic cricket in the 1997–98 Red Stripe Bowl when Barbados played Canada. Between 1997 and 2009, the ground played host to nine one-day matches; however, these were all neutral fixtures which did not feature Guyana. Guyana did play two first-class matches at the ground against a touring India A side in November 1999, and a touring South Africa A team in September 2000. In between these two matches, the West Indies Under-23s played a first-class match there against the touring Pakistanis.

As a football venue, it is the homeground of Den Amstel FC, who play in the GFF Elite League. The ground has played host to two matches in the 2001 Caribbean Cup, with Cuba playing Saint Martin and Dominica.

== Records ==
=== First-class ===
- Highest team total: 324 for 9 declared by India A v Guyana, 1999–00
- Lowest team total: 143 all out by West Indies Under-23s v Pakistanis, 1999–00
- Highest individual innings: 110 by J. Arunkumar for India A v Guyana, 1999–00
- Best bowling in an innings: 5–16 by Mohammad Akram for Pakistanis v West Indies Under-23s, 1999–00
- Best bowling in a match: 7–44 by Mohammad Akram for Pakistan A v West Indies Under-23s, as above

=== List A ===
- Highest team total: 258 for 8 (50 overs) by Barbados v Canada, 1997–98
- Lowest team total: 102 all out (43.1 overs) by Leeward Islands v Windward Islands, 2008–09
- Highest individual innings: 101 not out by Runako Morton for Leeward Islands v Jamaica, 2004–05
- Best bowling in an innings: 4–28 by Dinanath Ramnarine for Trinidad and Tobago v Bermuda, 1998–99

== See also ==
- List of cricket grounds in the West Indies
