= Ronald Powell (Nevisian cricketer) =

Nevisian cricketer (born 1968)

Personal information
- Born: 5 March 1968 (age 58); Nevis
- Source: Cricinfo, 24 November 2020

Ronald Powell (born 5 March 1968) is a Nevisian cricketer. He played in ten first-class and twenty-three List A matches for the Leeward Islands from 1994 to 2002.

== See also ==
- List of Leeward Islands first-class cricketers
