= Chedwin Park =

Cricket ground in Spanish Town, Jamaica

- Interactive map of Chedwin Park

Ground information
- Location: Spanish Town, Jamaica
- Country: Jamaica
- Coordinates: 17.9812°N 77.0027°W
- Establishment: c. 1953

Team information
Jamaica	(1976/77–2010/11)
- As of 28 April 2022; Source: Ground profile

Chedwin Park is a cricket ground in Spanish Town, Jamaica.

== History ==
Chewdin Park was considered by 1970 to have the finest cricket pitch in Jamaica. The first representative match played on the ground came in the 1976–77 Gillette Cup in a List A one-day match between Jamaica and Trinidad and Tobago. Four years later the ground played host to two first-class cricket matches 1980–81 Shell Shield, with Jamaica playing Trinidad and Tobago and Barbados. A gap of 15 years followed before representative cricket returned to Chedwin Park, with the Leeward Islands playing Trinidad and Tobago in a one-day match in the 1996–97 Shell/Sandals Trophy. Between 1996 and 2005, Chedwin Park regularly played host to one-day matches in the Red Stripe Bowl; the 16th, and to date final, one-day match to be played at the ground was a tour match between Jamaica and the South Africans. First-class cricket returned to Chedwin Park in 1997, with Jamaica playing 11 further first-class matches there until 2011, predominantly in the Regional Four Day Competition, with the exception of a match against Ireland in 2010.

A murder took place at the ground in May 2010, which resulted in two police officers from the Jamaica Constabulary Force being charged with the murder of businessman Sheldon Daley.

== Records ==
=== First-class ===
- Highest team total: 522 for 9 declared by Jamaica v Barbados, 2004–05
- Lowest team total: 97 all out by Leeward Islands v Jamaica, 1996–97
- Highest individual innings: 203 not out by Jimmy Adams for Jamaica v Trinidad and Tobago, 1997–98
- Best bowling in an innings: 7-28 by Nikita Miller for Jamaica v Windward Islands, 2009–10
- Best bowling in a match: 10-72 by Corey Collymore for Babardos v Jamaica, 2006–07

=== List A ===
- Highest team total: 310 for 7 (50 overs) by Barbados v Saint Vincent and the Grenadines, 2002–03
- Lowest team total: 62 all out (35.2 overs) by United States v Trinidad and Tobago, 2000–01
- Highest individual innings: 122 by Chris Gayle for Jamaica v Rest of Leeward Islands, 2001–02
- Best bowling in an innings: 4-15 by Mervyn Dillon for Jamaica v United States, 2000–01

== See also ==
- List of cricket grounds in the West Indies
