= Hendy Springer =

Barbadian cricketer (born 1964)

Personal information
- Full name: Henderson Winfield Da Costa Springer
- Born: 27 April 1964 (age 62); Bishops Hill, St Lucy, Barbados
- Batting: Right-handed
- Bowling: Right-arm offbreak
- Role: Bowler
- Source: CricketArchive, 17 January 2011

Henderson Winfield Da Costa Springer (born 27 April 1964) is a former Barbadian cricketer.

He played 26 first class and 31 List A matches as a right-handed batsman and a right-arm offbreak bowler. He played mainly for Barbados as well as Western Transvaal between 1987 and 1998. He was born at Bishops Hill in St Lucy.

He was coach of the West Indies ‘A’ team in 2006 and assistant coach of West Indies national cricket team in 2007.
