= Patterson Thompson =

West Indian cricketer

Personal information
- Full name: Patterson Ian Chesterfield Thompson
- Born: 26 September 1971 (age 55); Pine Garden, Saint Michael, Barbados
- Batting: Right-handed
- Bowling: Right-arm fast-medium

International information
- National side: West Indies
- Test debut: 19 April 1996 v New Zealand
- Last Test: 25 January 1997 v Australia
- ODI debut: 10 January 1997 v Pakistan
- Last ODI: 14 January 1997 v Pakistan

Domestic team information
- Years: Team
- 1994–1999: Barbados

Career statistics
Competition	Tests	ODIs	FC	LA
Matches	2	2	29	11
Runs scored	17	2	97	8
Batting average	8.50	2.00	4.21	2.66
100s/50s	0/0	0/0	0/0	0/0
Top score	10*	2	15	3*
Balls bowled	228	114	3,752	506
Wickets	5	2	70	9
Bowling average	43.00	55.00	34.04	46.44
5 wickets in innings	0	0	1	0
10 wickets in match	0	0	0	0
Best bowling	2/58	1/46	5/105	2/36
Catches/stumpings	0/–	0/–	7/–	5/–
- Source: CricketArchive, 24 October 2010

Patterson Ian Chesterfield Thompson (born 26 September 1971) is a former West Indies cricketer. He never recovered from a terrible start to his Test career and played only once more at that level, as well as in two One Day Internationals.

== Career ==
Thompson made his first-class debut for Barbados in the 1994–95 Red Stripe Cup, and performed well, taking six wickets in the game – his first being that of Jamaica's opening batsman and Test player Robert Samuels. He took ten wickets in all that season at 27.20, and in the following year's Red Stripe Cup he claimed 23 wickets, the fourth highest of any bowler that year, at 22.34. As a result, at the end of the West Indian season in April, Thompson was picked for the first Test against New Zealand at his home ground of Bridgetown.

Although West Indies won the match by ten wickets, Patterson himself had a torrid time. His first over in Test cricket went for 17 runs, and in all he bowled 13 no-balls (and a wide) in the first innings. He did pick up two wickets, but finished with the analysis of 8–0–58–2.

In 1996–97 after having a poor time in the List A Shell/Sandals Trophy where he took only four wickets at 57.50, he was perhaps a little lucky to be chosen for the Australian tour, and he proved very expensive in the pre-Test first-class games, with aggregate figures of 4–291 in four matches. He also conceded 110 in 19 overs against Pakistan in two ODIs at Perth and Sydney. Nevertheless, he was picked against the Australians for the fourth Test at Adelaide.

West Indies were crushed by an innings and 183 runs, and again Patterson failed to deliver bowling sixteen overs for eighty runs.

He played on in domestic cricket for another couple of seasons, although without any outstanding success, before bowing out with a game against Trinidad and Tobago in the 1998–99 Busta Cup. Ironically, his first-innings bowling performance was one of his most economical: his 10 overs went for only 19. However, the second innings was a different story as his no-ball problem returned with a vengeance. He sent down 12 of them in the space of seven wicketless overs, and with that he left the first-class game for good.
