= David Lawrence (cricketer) =

English cricketer (1964–2025)

David Lawrence MBE
Personal information
- Full name: David Valentine Lawrence
- Born: 28 January 1964; Gloucester, England
- Died: 21 June 2025 (aged 61)
- Nickname: Syd
- Batting: Right-handed
- Bowling: Right-arm fast
- Role: Bowler

Career statistics
Competition	Test	ODI	FC	LA
Matches	5	1	185	113
Runs scored	60	–	1,851	292
Batting average	10.00	–	10.69	10.81
100s/50s	0/0	–	0/2	0/0
Top score	34	–	66	38
Balls bowled	1,089	66	26,930	5,362
Wickets	18	4	515	155
Bowling average	37.55	16.75	32.07	26.43
5 wickets in innings	1	0	21	4
10 wickets in match	0	0	1	0
Best bowling	5/106	4/67	7/47	6/20
Catches/stumpings	0/–	0/–	45/–	24/–
- Source: Cricinfo, 1 January 2006

David Valentine Lawrence (28 January 1964 – 21 June 2025) was an English cricketer, who mainly played for Gloucestershire and briefly featured for England, becoming the first British-born black player to represent the country. He picked up 625 wickets in 280 matches for Gloucestershire, where he appeared in a bowling attack alongside Courtney Walsh and Kevin Curran. Lawrence later suffered a severe knee injury, on international duty, which curtailed his playing days. In 2022, he became the first black president of Gloucestershire County Cricket Club. He was appointed a Member of the Order of the British Empire (MBE) in the 2025 Birthday Honours for services to cricket. He was popularly nicknamed "Syd" after the British bandleader of that name.

== Life and career ==
Lawrence was born in Gloucester, England on 28 January 1964 to Jamaican parents. By the age of 17 he was playing for Gloucestershire, opening the bowling with Courtney Walsh. His vigorous bowling action generated great pace, although at times he was also prone to inaccuracy. He toured Sri Lanka with an England 'B' side in 1985–6. He was later named the 1985 Cricket Writers' Club Young Cricketer of the Year.

Lawrence was certainly one of the fastest bowlers in domestic cricket of his era. During the 1988 season, in a match against the touring West Indies, in gloomy conditions at Bristol, a delivery from Lawrence struck batter Phil Simmons on the head. Simmons had not been wearing a helmet, and his heart stopped beating as he was rushed to hospital for emergency brain surgery; he made a full recovery. Later that season Lawrence came into the England team for the one-off Test match against Sri Lanka. Although he finished on the winning side in that Test, England's first victory in a Test match for nearly two years, with the emergence of Devon Malcolm he was not selected again until the Trent Bridge Test of 1991. The West Indies were then the opponents, so that Lawrence faced up to the recovered Simmons again, dismissing him in the second innings. Lawrence then took his only Test five-wicket haul, 5 for 106, at The Oval, contributing to England's series-levelling win in the Fifth Test. To Lawrence fell the distinction of being the last bowler to dismiss Viv Richards in Test cricket. He retained his place for a subsequent match against Sri Lanka. He also played his only one-day international that season at Lord's, returning the best bowling figures in the match, 4 for 67 in 11 eventful overs, including his Gloucestershire colleague Walsh among his wickets. As of present, these remain the best bowling figures recorded by a bowler who played only one one-day international.

Having just established himself as part of England's primary bowling strikeforce, he suffered a knee injury on 10 February 1992, in Wellington, New Zealand, while playing his fifth Test for his country. In the middle of his delivery stride, his left patella (knee cap) shattered, the noise of it reaching as far as the boundary; spectators said the sound of his knee splitting was "like a pistol shot". Lawrence collapsed to the ground screaming, and was eventually carried from the field on a stretcher, comforted by teammate Ian Botham. Despite two come-back attempts for his county, including the first after a full thirteen months of recuperation, when the knee cracked yet again during a gymnasium work-out, he was never able to play for England again and eventually retired from the sport at the age of 29. Later, he made a career for himself in bodybuilding.

== Personal life and death ==
Lawrence owned a nightclub, located in Bristol, by the name of Dojo, until its closure in May 2024. In June 2024, it was announced that he had been diagnosed with motor neurone disease. In June 2025, he was reported as no longer being able to walk or talk.

He published his autobiography, In Syd's Voice - The Extraordinary Life of Syd Lawrence (ISBN 1915237548) in June 2025.

Lawrence died on 21 June 2025, at the age of 61.
