= Martin Nurse =

West Indian cricketer (born 1985)

Martin Andre Nurse (born 11 June 1985, in Durants, Barbados), is a West Indian cricketer who played in the 2004 U-19 Cricket World Cup in Bangladesh. He has also played first-class and List A cricket for Barbados.
