= Sherwin Ganga =

Trinidadian cricketer (born 1982)

Sherwin Ganga (born February 13, 1982, in Barrackpore, Trinidad and Tobago) is a cricketer who plays for Trinidad and Tobago. An offspin bowling allrounder, Ganga debuted in 2003/04 and is the brother of Daren Ganga. The closest Sherwin Ganga ever got to representing the West Indies was in 2004 when he was included in the 25 probables to compete in the tri series in Australia, however he didn't make the cut.
