= Albion Sports Complex =

Sports venue in Guyana

- Interactive map of Albion Sports Complex

Ground information
- Location: Albion, Guyana
- Country: West Indies
- Coordinates: 6.266°N 57.374°W
- Establishment: 1977
- Capacity: 15,000
- Owner: Guyana Sugar Corporation

International information
- First men's ODI: 16 March 1977: West Indies v Pakistan
- Last men's ODI: 14 April 1985: West Indies v New Zealand
- As of 31 August 2013; Source: ESPNcricinfo

Albion Sports Complex is a cricket stadium in Guyana. It is located in Albion and has been used by the West Indies cricket team and Guyana national cricket team. A total of five One Day Internationals (ODIs) have been played from 1977 and 1985.

== Dimensions ==
The Albion Sports Complex has a 300 meters athletics track, and is used by Central Corentyne Chamber of Commerce (CCCC) for their Annual Trade Fair. The owner of the complex is Guyana Sugar Corporation (GUYSUCO).

== International venue ==
Albion Sports Complex was the first ground of Guyana to host an ODI match. The match was played between the West Indies and Pakistan in March 1977. Despite Pakistani captain, Asif Iqbal, scored 59 not out and earned the man of the match award, the West Indies won the match by four wickets. The ground hosted an ODI for the last time in April 1985, a match played between the West Indies and New Zealand. The West Indies won the match by 130 runs with Desmond Haynes scoring 145—highest individual innings by any player at the ground.

Haynes was the most successful batsman at the ground scoring 328 runs in four matches, with the help of two centuries and an average of 164.00. Larry Gomes was most prolific bowler: playing in four matches, he took eight wickets for 134 runs with the average of 16.75. Best bowling figures for an innings were three wickets for nine runs, achieved by Colin Croft against England in February 1981.

The highest total in an innings at the ground, 282 for 5, was scored by India where as the lowest total – 129 all out – was scored by New Zealand in April 1985. The West Indies was most successful at the ground winning four out of five ODIs. Their only loss came in March 1983, a match India won by 27 runs. The most recent first class cricket match at the ground was played between Guyana and Barbados in February 2010—Barbados won the match by 58 runs.

== International Centuries ==
Only two ODI centuries have been scored at the venue, both by Desmond Haynes.

No.	Score	Player	Team	Balls	Opposing team	Date	Result
1	133*	Desmond Haynes	West Indies	147	Australia	29 February 1984	Won
2	145*	Desmond Haynes	West Indies	157	New Zealand	14 April 1985	Won
