= Evon McInnis =

Jamaican cricketer (born 1980)

Personal information
- Full name: Evan Junior McInnis
- Born: 2 January 1980 (age 46); St Elizabeth, Jamaica
- Batting: Right-handed
- Bowling: Right-arm medium-fast
- Role: Bowler

Domestic team information
- Years: Team
- 2003/04–2004/05: Jamaica
- 2007/08: Central Districts

Career statistics
Competition	First-class	List A
Matches	4	13
Runs scored	77	63
Batting average	19.25	12.60
100s/50s	0/0	0/0
Top score	47	21
Balls bowled	648	594
Wickets	10	11
Bowling average	30.40	44.63
5 wickets in innings	0	0
10 wickets in match	0	0
Best bowling	4/71	3/42
Catches/stumpings	1/–	2/–
- Source: Cricinfo, 26 April 2008

Evon McInnnis (born 2 January 1980) is a former cricketer born in Jamaica who played for Jamaica and then Central Districts in New Zealand.
