= 1997 ICC Trophy squads =

Twenty-two teams participated in the 1997 ICC Trophy, the sixth edition of the tournament. Two teams, Italy and Scotland, were making their debuts.

== Argentina ==
Only players who appeared in at least one match at the tournament are listed. The leading run-scorer is marked with a dagger (†) and the leading wicket-taker with a double dagger (‡).

Coach: (Argentina) J. G. Ferguson

- Gastón Arizaga
- Sergio Ciaburri
- Donald Forrester
- Bernardo Irigoyen ‡
- Martin Juarez
- Guillermo Kirschbaum
- Diego Lord
- Miguel Morris

- Matias Paterlini †
- Hernan Pereyra
- Andres Perez Rivero
- Maximiliano Riveros
- Brian Roberts
- Miguel Rowe
- Christian Tuñon
- Malcolm van Steeden

Source: ESPNcricinfo

== Bangladesh ==
Only players who appeared in at least one match at the tournament are listed. The leading run-scorer is marked with a dagger (†) and the leading wicket-taker with a double dagger (‡).

Coach: (Barbados) Gordon Greenidge

- Akram Khan
- Aminul Islam †
- Athar Ali Khan
- Enamul Haque
- Hasibul Hossain
- Jahangir Alam
- Khaled Mahmud
- Habibul Bashar

- Khaled Mashud
- Minhajul Abedin
- Mohammad Rafique ‡
- Naimur Rahman
- Saiful Islam
- Sanwar Hossain

Source: ESPNcricinfo

== Bermuda ==
Only players who appeared in at least one match at the tournament are listed. The leading run-scorer is marked with a dagger (†) and the leading wicket-taker with a double dagger (‡).

Coaches: (Bermuda) Allan Douglas and (Australia) Bob Simpson

- Roger Blades
- Kameron Fox
- Corey Hill
- Delano Hollis
- Kevin Hurdle
- Arnold Manders
- Charlie Marshall
- Dean Minors

- Bruce Perinchief
- Clay Smith
- Dexter Smith
- Glen Smith
- Albert Steede
- Roger Trott
- Janeiro Tucker †‡

Source: ESPNcricinfo

== Canada ==
Only players who appeared in at least one match at the tournament are listed. The leading run-scorer is marked with a dagger (†) and the leading wicket-taker with a double dagger (‡).

Coach: (Trinidad and Tobago) Larry Gomes

- Latchman Bhansingh
- Desmond Chumney
- Muneeb Diwan
- Derick Etwaroo
- Alex Glegg
- Nigel Isaacs
- Martin Johnson
- Davis Joseph

- Ingleton Liburd †
- Don Maxwell
- Derek Perera
- Brian Rajadurai
- Danny Ramnarais
- Sukhjinder Rana
- Barry Seebaran ‡
- Shiv Seeram

Source: ESPNcricinfo

== Denmark ==
Only players who appeared in at least one match at the tournament are listed. The leading run-scorer is marked with a dagger (†) and the leading wicket-taker with a double dagger (‡).

Coach: (Denmark) Ole Mortensen

- Thomas Hansen
- Lars Hedegaard
- Morten Hedegaard
- Søren Henriksen
- Johnny Jensen †
- Peer Jensen
- Søren Kristensen

- Mickey Lund
- Steen Nielsen
- Carsten Pedersen
- Anders Rasmussen
- Baljit Singh
- Søren Sørensen ‡
- Søren Vestergaard

Source: ESPNcricinfo

== East and Central Africa ==
Only players who appeared in at least one match at the tournament are listed. The leading run-scorer is marked with a dagger (†) and the leading wicket-taker with a double dagger (‡).

Coach: (South Africa) Ismail Hassan

- Haroon Bags
- Imran Brohi
- Arshad Dudhia
- Arif Ebrahim
- Chad Gomm ‡
- Murtaza Jivraj
- James Komakech
- John Lubia

- Tendo Mbazzi
- Imran Mohamed
- Benjamin Musoke
- Frank Nsubuga
- Arif Pali
- Yekesh Patel †
- Faizel Sarigat

Source: ESPNcricinfo

== Fiji ==
Only players who appeared in at least one match at the tournament are listed. The leading run-scorer is marked with a dagger (†) and the leading wicket-taker with a double dagger (‡).

- Taione Batina
- Joji Bulabalavu
- Iniasi Cakacaka
- Taione Cakacaka
- Joeli Mateyawa
- Neil Maxwell †‡
- Jason Rouse

- Jone Seuvou
- Asaeli Sorovakatini
- Jone Sorovakatini
- Lesi Sorovakatini
- Eroni Tadu
- Atunaisi Tawatatau
- Waisake Tukana

Source: ESPNcricinfo

== Gibraltar ==
Only players who appeared in at least one match at the tournament are listed. The leading run-scorer is marked with a dagger (†) and the leading wicket-taker with a double dagger (‡).

Coach: (England) Richard Cox

- Richard Buzaglo
- Tim Buzaglo
- Steve Cary
- Nigel Churaman ‡
- Clive Clinton
- Gary De'Ath
- Terence Garcia

- Adrian Hewitt
- Daniel Johnson
- Geoff Mills
- Rudolph Phillips
- Dave Robeson
- Christian Rocca †
- Stephen Shephard

Source: ESPNcricinfo

== Hong Kong ==
Only players who appeared in at least one match at the tournament are listed. The leading run-scorer is marked with a dagger (†) and the leading wicket-taker with a double dagger (‡).

Coach: (New Zealand) David Trist

- Stewart Brew
- Ray Brewster
- Mark Eames
- Riaz Farcy †
- Pat Fordham
- Steven Foster
- Alexander French
- Munir Hussain

- David Jones
- Roy Lamsam
- Martin Lever
- Kamran Raza
- Rahul Sharma
- Ravi Sujanani
- Michael Swift
- Mohammad Zubair ‡

Source: ESPNcricinfo

== Ireland ==
Only players who appeared in at least one match at the tournament are listed. The leading run-scorer is marked with a dagger (†) and the leading wicket-taker with a double dagger (‡).

Coach: (India) M. V. Narasimha Rao

- Justin Benson
- Dekker Curry †
- Neil Doak ‡
- Angus Dunlop
- Ryan Eagleson
- Peter Gillespie
- Uel Graham
- Garfield Harrison

- Derek Heasley
- Alan Lewis
- Paul McCrum
- Greg Molins
- Andrew Patterson
- Mark Patterson
- Alan Rutherford

Source: ESPNcricinfo

== Israel ==
Only players who appeared in at least one match at the tournament are listed. The leading run-scorer is marked with a dagger (†) and the leading wicket-taker with a double dagger (‡).

Coach: (Australia) Steven Herzberg

- Raymond Aston ‡
- Hillel Awasker
- Louis Hall
- Moses Jawalekar
- Benzie Kehimkar
- Alan Moss
- Yefeth Nagavkar
- Stanley Perlman

- David Silver †
- Paul Smith
- Avi Talkar
- Moses Talker
- Adrian Vard
- Menashe Wadavkar
- Valice Worrell

Source: ESPNcricinfo

== Italy ==
Only players who appeared in at least one match at the tournament are listed. The leading run-scorer is marked with a dagger (†) and the leading wicket-taker with a double dagger (‡).

Coach: (England) Doug Ferguson

- Sajjad Ahmed
- Andrea Amati
- Massimo da Costa
- Samantha de Mel
- Benito Giordano †
- Kamal Kariyawasam
- Ricardo Maggio
- Razzaq Mohammad

- Thomas Parisi
- Andrea Pezzi
- Alessandro Pieri
- Akhlaq Qureshi ‡
- Gamini Rajapakse
- Valerio Zuppiroli
- Filippo Zito

Source: ESPNcricinfo

== Kenya ==
Only players who appeared in at least one match at the tournament are listed. The leading run-scorer is marked with a dagger (†) and the leading wicket-taker with a double dagger (‡).

Coach: (India) Sandeep Patil

- Sandeep Gupta
- Aasif Karim ‡
- Hitesh Modi
- Thomas Odoyo
- Maurice Odumbe †
- Tito Odumbe
- Lameck Onyango

- Kennedy Otieno
- Brijal Patel
- Martin Suji
- Tony Suji
- David Tikolo
- Steve Tikolo

Source: ESPNcricinfo

== Malaysia ==
Only players who appeared in at least one match at the tournament are listed. The leading run-scorer is marked with a dagger (†) and the leading wicket-taker with a double dagger (‡).

Coach: (Sri Lanka) Mumtaz Yusuf

- Saat Jalil
- Ramesh Menon
- Marimuthu Muniandy
- Jeevandran Nair
- Suresh Navaratnam ‡
- Vivek Rajah
- Dinesh Ramadas

- Kunjiraman Ramadas
- Venu Ramadass
- Rohan Selvaratnam
- Suresh Singh
- Tan Kim Hing
- Santhara Vello
- Matthew William †

Source: ESPNcricinfo

== Namibia ==
Only players who appeared in at least one match at the tournament are listed. The leading run-scorer is marked with a dagger (†) and the leading wicket-taker with a double dagger (‡).

Coach: (England) Neil Lenham

- Wayne Ackerman
- Mark Barnard
- David Coetzee
- Morne Karg
- Danie Keulder †
- Bjorn Kotze
- Deon Kotze

- Gavin Murgatroyd
- Darren Seager
- Ian Stevenson
- Jackie Thirion
- Ian van Schoor
- Melt van Schoor
- Rudi van Vuuren ‡

Source: ESPNcricinfo

== Netherlands ==
Only players who appeared in at least one match at the tournament are listed. The leading run-scorer is marked with a dagger (†) and the leading wicket-taker with a double dagger (‡).

Coach: (Australia) John Bell

- Zulfiqar Ahmed
- Peter Cantrell
- Tim de Leede †
- Godfrey Edwards
- Tjade Groot
- Asim Khan ‡
- Roland Lefebvre
- Marc Nota

- Reinout Scholte
- Ravi Singh
- Jeroen Smits
- Steven van Dijk
- Klaas-Jan van Noortwijk
- Robert van Oosterom
- Andre van Troost
- Bas Zuiderent

Source: ESPNcricinfo

== Papua New Guinea ==
Only players who appeared in at least one match at the tournament are listed. The leading run-scorer is marked with a dagger (†) and the leading wicket-taker with a double dagger (‡).

Coach: (Australia) Errol Harris

- Charles Amini
- Fred Arua
- Toka Gaudi
- Kosta Ilaraki
- Rarua Ipi
- Vai Kevau
- Wari Kila
- Leka Leka

- James Maha
- Navu Maha
- Ipi Morea
- John Ovia †
- Vavine Pala ‡
- Tuku Raka
- Keimelo Vuivagi

Source: ESPNcricinfo

== Scotland ==
Only players who appeared in at least one match at the tournament are listed. The leading run-scorer is marked with a dagger (†) and the leading wicket-taker with a double dagger (‡).

Coach: (England) Jim Love

- Mike Allingham
- Ian Beven ‡
- John Blain
- David Cowan
- Alec Davies
- Scott Gourlay
- Stuart Kennedy
- Dougie Lockhart

- Bryn Lockie
- Ian Philip
- George Salmond †
- Keith Sheridan
- Mike Smith
- Andy Tennant
- Kevin Thomson
- Greig Williamson

Source: ESPNcricinfo

== Singapore ==
Only players who appeared in at least one match at the tournament are listed. The leading run-scorer is marked with a dagger (†) and the leading wicket-taker with a double dagger (‡).

Coach: (Australia) Grant Stanley

- Dinesh Chelvathurai
- Abhijit Dass
- Rod David
- Kiran Deshpande
- Goh Swee Heng
- Charlie Gunningham
- Rex Martens
- Thaiyar Mohamed †

- Stacey Muruthi
- Manoj Patil
- Remesh Ramadas
- Anthon Ranggi
- Moiz Sithawalla
- Jeremy Stone
- Ravi Thambinayagam
- Graham Wilson ‡

Source: ESPNcricinfo

== United Arab Emirates ==
Only players who appeared in at least one match at the tournament are listed. The leading run-scorer is marked with a dagger (†) and the leading wicket-taker with a double dagger (‡).

Coach: (Sri Lanka) Champaka Ramanayake

- Adnan Mushtaq
- Ahmed Nadeem
- Ali Akbar
- Arif Yousuf
- Arshad Laeeq ‡
- Asim Saeed
- Azhar Saeed †
- Basil Jayawardene

- Mahmood Pir Baksh
- Mohammad Atif
- Mohammad Hyder
- Mohammad Tauqir
- Saeed-al-Saffar
- Saleem Raza
- Shehzad Altaf
- Vijay Perera

Source: ESPNcricinfo

== United States ==
Only players who appeared in at least one match at the tournament are listed. The leading run-scorer is marked with a dagger (†) and the leading wicket-taker with a double dagger (‡).

Coach: (Guyana) Roger Harper

- Compton Adams
- Aijaz Ali
- Sohail Alvi
- Zamin Amin
- Faoud Bacchus †
- Reginald Benjamin
- Kenrick Dennis
- Raymond Denny

- Eon Grant
- Abdul Islam
- Naseer Islam
- Derek Kallicharran ‡
- Rudy Lachman
- Edward Lewis
- Paul Singh
- Albert Texeira

Source: ESPNcricinfo

== West Africa ==
Only players who appeared in at least one match at the tournament are listed. The leading run-scorer is marked with a dagger (†) and the leading wicket-taker with a double dagger (‡).

- Kome Agodo
- Chuka Ahuchogu
- Kwasi Asiedu
- Alfred Crooks
- Seye Fadahunsi ‡
- Dipo Idowu
- Albert Kpundeh
- Sahr Kpundeh

- Uche Ntinu
- Edinam Nutsugah
- Obo Omoigui
- Kofi Sagoe
- Serry Turay
- Okon Ukpong †
- Daniel Vanderpuje-Orgle
- George Wiltshire

Source: ESPNcricinfo

== Sources ==
- CricketArchive: Averages by teams, Carlsberg ICC Trophy 1996/97
- ESPNcricinfo: Carlsberg ICC Trophy, 1996/97 / Statistics
