= 1990 ICC Trophy squads =

Seventeen teams participated in the 1990 ICC Trophy, the fourth edition of the tournament. No teams were making their debut, but Singapore returned to competition for the first time since the 1982 edition.

== Argentina ==
Only players who appeared in at least one match at the tournament are listed. The leading run-scorer is marked with a dagger (†) and the leading wicket-taker with a double dagger (‡).

- Leo Alonso
- Douglas Annand
- Sergio Ciaburri
- Martin Cortabarria
- Tony Ferguson
- Donald Forrester
- Alexander Gooding
- Bernardo Irigoyen

- Guillermo Kirschbaum †
- Alan Morris
- Miguel Morris
- Christopher Nino
- Hernan Pereyra ‡
- Brian Roberts
- Michael Ryan
- T. E. Trabucco

Source: ESPNcricinfo

== Bangladesh ==
Only players who appeared in at least one match at the tournament are listed. The leading run-scorer is marked with a dagger (†) and the leading wicket-taker with a double dagger (‡).

- Akram Khan
- Aminul Islam
- Azhar Hossain
- Enamul Haque
- Faruk Ahmed
- Gazi Ashraf
- Gholam Nousher ‡
- Golam Faruq

- Harunur Rashid
- Jahangir Alam
- Minhajul Abedin †
- Nasir Ahmed
- Nurul Abedin
- Shanewas Shahid
- Zahid Razzak

Source: ESPNcricinfo

== Bermuda ==
Only players who appeared in at least one match at the tournament are listed. The leading run-scorer is marked with a dagger (†) and the leading wicket-taker with a double dagger (‡).

- Arnold Amory
- Gary Brangman
- Terry Burgess
- Maxwell Curtis
- Allan Douglas
- Pacer Edwards
- Noel Gibbons
- Ricky Hill †

- Olin Jones
- Roger Leverock
- Darrin Lewis
- Kyle Lightbourne ‡
- Andre Manders
- Arnold Manders
- Tyrone Smith
- Wendell Smith

Source: ESPNcricinfo

== Canada ==
Only players who appeared in at least one match at the tournament are listed. The leading run-scorer is marked with a dagger (†) and the leading wicket-taker with a double dagger (‡).

- Garvin Budhoo
- Christopher Chappell
- Ron Dipchand
- Andrew Dornellas
- Derick Etwaroo
- Tony Gardner ‡
- Davis Joseph

- Farooq Kirmani
- Ingleton Liburd †
- Martin Prashad
- Paul Prashad
- Roy Ramsammy
- Barry Seebaran
- Danny Singh

Source: ESPNcricinfo

== Denmark ==
Only players who appeared in at least one match at the tournament are listed. The leading run-scorer is marked with a dagger (†) and the leading wicket-taker with a double dagger (‡).

- Aftab Ahmed
- Niels Bindslev
- Jens Bredo
- Atif Butt
- Allan From-Hansen
- Jesper Gregersen
- Søren Henriksen
- Johnny Jensen †

- Peter Jensen
- Tim Jensen
- Søren Mikkelsen
- Ole Mortensen ‡
- Jens Priess
- Søren Sørensen
- Ole Stoustrup
- Steen Thomsen

Source: ESPNcricinfo

== East and Central Africa ==
Only players who appeared in at least one match at the tournament are listed. The leading run-scorer is marked with a dagger (†) and the leading wicket-taker with a double dagger (‡).

- Haroon Bags
- Balraj Bouri
- H. Davda
- Pravin Desai
- W. Kibukumusoke
- Sajaad Lakha ‡
- S. Naik
- Hitash Patadia †

- Dinesh Patel
- Janak Patel
- Jayesh Patel
- Faizel Sarigat
- Gulam Shariff
- H. Tejani
- Sam Walusimbi
- Yona Waphakhabulo

Source: ESPNcricinfo

== Fiji ==
Only players who appeared in at least one match at the tournament are listed. The leading run-scorer is marked with a dagger (†) and the leading wicket-taker with a double dagger (‡).

- S. K. G. Amin
- Taione Batina
- A. P. Browne
- Cecil Browne
- Stephen Campbell
- Joeli Mateyawa
- Neil Maxwell
- Asaeli Sorovakatini

- Jone Sorovakatini †
- Lesi Sorovakatini
- Atunaisi Tawatatau
- Ilikena Vuli
- Apenisa Waqaninamata ‡
- Richard Wotta

Source: ESPNcricinfo

== Gibraltar ==
Only players who appeared in at least one match at the tournament are listed. The leading run-scorer is marked with a dagger (†) and the leading wicket-taker with a double dagger (‡).

- A. Benson
- Steve Boylan
- Bob Brooks ‡
- Richard Buzaglo
- Tim Buzaglo
- S. Chinnappa †
- Gary De'Ath
- H. Finch

- Vince Kenny
- A. Raikes
- Jeffrey Rhodes
- Clive Robinson
- Christian Rocca
- Willie Scott
- F. Vasquez

Source: ESPNcricinfo

== Hong Kong ==
Only players who appeared in at least one match at the tournament are listed. The leading run-scorer is marked with a dagger (†) and the leading wicket-taker with a double dagger (‡).

- David Brettell
- Ray Brewster
- Glyn Davies
- David Evans
- Riswan Farouq
- Bob Fotheringham
- David Jones
- Krish Kumar

- Jason Marsden †
- David Paull
- Nanda Perera
- Martin Sabine
- Tarun Sawney
- Nigel Stearns
- Salauddin Tariq ‡
- Yarman Vachha

Source: ESPNcricinfo

== Israel ==
Only players who appeared in at least one match at the tournament are listed. The leading run-scorer is marked with a dagger (†) and the leading wicket-taker with a double dagger (‡).

- Hillel Awasker
- Colwyn Callendar
- Aby Daniels
- Aaron Davidson
- Solomon Erulkar †
- Benny Gadkar
- Michael Jacob
- Nissam Jhirad

- Benzie Kehimkar
- Jerrold Kessel
- Zion Moshe
- Alan Moss ‡
- Yonathan Osker
- Stanley Perlman
- Shimshon Raj
- Nissam Reuben

Source: ESPNcricinfo

== Kenya ==
Only players who appeared in at least one match at the tournament are listed. The leading run-scorer is marked with a dagger (†) and the leading wicket-taker with a double dagger (‡).

- Dipak Chudasama
- Sandeep Gupta
- Tariq Iqbal
- Muslim Kanji
- Aasif Karim ‡
- Sibtain Kassamali
- Daniel Macdonald
- Alfred Njuguna

- Bernard Odumbe
- Martin Odumbe
- Maurice Odumbe †
- Tito Odumbe
- Bharat Shah
- Martin Suji
- David Tikolo
- Tom Tikolo

Source: ESPNcricinfo

== Malaysia ==
Only players who appeared in at least one match at the tournament are listed. The leading run-scorer is marked with a dagger (†) and the leading wicket-taker with a double dagger (‡).

- Harris Abu Bakar
- S. Bell
- Rakesh Chander ‡
- S. W. Hong
- Saat Jalil
- S. Menon
- S. Meyor
- Marimuthu Muniandy ‡

- Banerji Nair
- Hatta Pattabongi
- S. Rajkumar
- Kunjiraman Ramadas
- W. J. Ranggi
- Asgari Stevens †
- Tan Kim Hing
- V. Vijayalingham

Source: ESPNcricinfo

== Netherlands ==
Only players who appeared in at least one match at the tournament are listed. The leading run-scorer is marked with a dagger (†) and the leading wicket-taker with a double dagger (‡).

- Flavian Aponso
- Paul-Jan Bakker
- Nolan Clarke †
- Oscar Danser
- Tim de Leede
- Eric Dulfer
- Godfrey Edwards
- Rupert Gomes

- Floris Jansen
- Roland Lefebvre ‡
- Steven Lubbers
- Cees Ruskamp
- Reinout Scholte
- Robert van Oosterom
- Andre van Troost
- Rob Vos

Source: ESPNcricinfo

== Papua New Guinea ==
Only players who appeared in at least one match at the tournament are listed. The leading run-scorer is marked with a dagger (†) and the leading wicket-taker with a double dagger (‡).

- Numa Alu
- Charles Amini
- Tani Amini
- Tau Ao †
- Renagi Ila
- Kosta Ilaraki
- Daure Lohia

- Kula Loi ‡
- William Maha
- Vavine Pala
- Ola Raka
- Tuku Raka
- Gamu Ravu

Source: ESPNcricinfo

== Singapore ==
Only players who appeared in at least one match at the tournament are listed. The leading run-scorer is marked with a dagger (†) and the leading wicket-taker with a double dagger (‡).

- Mukhtar Ahmed
- S. Anura
- B. Balakrishnan †
- B. G. Field
- Mahmood Gaznavi
- Imran Hamid
- D. B. How
- S. A. Iftikhar

- Mohanvelu Jeevanathan
- B. Murugamoorthy
- Stacey Muruthi
- Mohanvelu Neethianathan
- T. E. Seal ‡
- Harnam Singh
- Selvanayagam Sivalingham
- Ravi Thambinayagam

Source: ESPNcricinfo

== United States ==
Only players who appeared in at least one match at the tournament are listed. The leading run-scorer is marked with a dagger (†) and the leading wicket-taker with a double dagger (‡).

- Zamin Amin ‡
- Reginald Benjamin
- Hubert Blackman
- Early Daley
- Neil Lashkari
- Terry Mills
- Errol Peart †
- Kamran Rasheed

- H. Russell
- Sew Shivnarine
- Sam Smith
- Victor Stoute
- Kevin Wedderburn
- John Willoughby
- Ray Wynter

Source: ESPNcricinfo

== Zimbabwe ==
Only players who appeared in at least one match at the tournament are listed. The leading run-scorer is marked with a dagger (†) and the leading wicket-taker with a double dagger (‡).

- Kevin Arnott
- Eddo Brandes ‡
- Jon Brent
- Gavin Briant
- David Dolphin
- Kevin Duers
- Andy Flower †
- Grant Flower

- David Houghton
- Wayne James
- Malcolm Jarvis
- Grant Paterson
- Andy Pycroft
- Colin Robertson
- Ali Shah
- John Traicos

Source: ESPNcricinfo

== Sources ==
- CricketArchive: Averages by teams, Unibind ICC Trophy 1990
- ESPNcricinfo: Unibind ICC Trophy, 1990 / Statistics
