= 2024 Sunrisers (women's cricket) season =

English cricket season

Sunrisers
2024 season
- Coach: Andy Tennant
- Captain: Grace Scrivens
- Overseas player: (Australia) Nicola Hancock (South Africa) Dane van Niekerk (Note: Ruled out for the entire season due to personal reasons.)
- RHFT: Champions
- CEC: 8th
- Most runs: RHFT: Grace Scrivens (553); CEC: Jo Gardner (260)
- Most wickets: RHFT: Kate Coppack (19) & Jodi Grewcock (19); CEC: Sophie Munro (11)
- Most catches: RHFT: Mady Villiers (7) & Jo Gardner (7); CEC: Jo Gardner (4)
- Most wicket-keeping dismissals: RHFT: Amara Carr (17); CEC: Amara Carr (9)

The 2024 season was Sunrisers' fifth season, in which competed in the 50 over Rachael Heyhoe Flint Trophy and the Twenty20 Charlotte Edwards Cup. In the Charlotte Edwards Cup, the side finished bottom of the group, winning two of their ten matches. In the Rachael Heyhoe Flint Trophy, the side finished fourth in the group stage, winning seven of their fourteen matches to qualify for the knockout stages. They defeated group winners Northern Diamonds in the semi-final and South East Stars in the final to win their first-ever trophy.

The side was captained by Grace Scrivens and coached by Andy Tennant. They played five home matches at the County Ground, Chelmsford, three at Brunton Memorial Ground two apiece at the County Ground, Northampton and Lord's.

This was Sunrisers' final season in existence, effectively being replaced by a professionalised Essex team under the England and Wales Cricket Board's changes to the structure of women's domestic cricket from 2025 onwards.

== Squad ==
=== Departures ===
On 20 December 2023, it was announced that Scarlett Hughes had left the side, joining The Blaze. On 4 April 2024, Sunrisers confirmed their squad for the season, with Mia Rogers departing the side. On 2 September 2024, it was announced that Charley Phillips had gone on loan to The Blaze until the end of the season.

=== Arrivals ===
On 23 February 2024, it was announced that the side had signed Dane van Niekerk as an overseas player from the beginning of the Charlotte Edwards Cup. van Niekerk had previously played for the side during the 2023 season. van Niekerk was later ruled out of her stint with the club due to personal reasons. On 4 April 2024, Sunrisers confirmed their squad for the season, with Charley Phillips joining the full squad from the academy. On 12 April 2024, it was announced that the side had signed Nicola Hancock as an overseas player for the first six matches of the season. On 10 May 2024, with Dane van Niekerk no longer be joining for the Charlotte Edwards Cup, it was announced that Hancock's contract would be extended to cover the Charlotte Edwards Cup. On 22 May 2024, it was announced that the side had signed Sophie Munro on loan from The Blaze for the Charlotte Edwards Cup. Munro's loan was later extended until the end of July, and later extended again until the end of the season.

=== Personnel and contract changes ===
On 2 October 2023, it was announced that Ariana Dowse had signed her first professional contract with the side. On 4 April 2024, the side announced that Grace Scrivens would captain the side in the Rachael Heyhoe Flint Trophy, with Dane van Niekerk captaining in the Charlotte Edwards Cup. With van Niekerk ruled out of her stint with the club due to personal reasons, Scrivens captained the side in all formats.

=== Squad list ===
- Age given is at the start of Sunrisers' first match of the season (20 April 2024).

Name	Nationality	Birth date	Batting style	Bowling style	Notes
Batters
Cordelia Griffith	England	19 September 1995 (aged 28)	Right-handed	Right-arm medium	
Florence Miller	England	26 February 2004 (aged 20)	Right-handed	Right-arm medium	
All-rounders
Kelly Castle	England	4 September 1997 (aged 26)	Right-handed	Right-arm medium	
Kate Coppack	England	30 August 1994 (aged 29)	Right-handed	Right-arm medium	
Jo Gardner	England	25 March 1997 (aged 27)	Right-handed	Right-arm off break	
Jodi Grewcock	England	30 November 2004 (aged 19)	Left-handed	Right-arm leg break	
Alice Macleod	England	14 May 1994 (aged 29)	Right-handed	Right-arm off break	
Grace Scrivens	England	10 November 2003 (aged 20)	Left-handed	Right-arm off break	Captain
Katherine Speed	England	5 October 2001 (aged 22)	Right-handed	Right-arm medium	
Amuruthaa Surenkumar	England	24 October 2006 (aged 17)	Right-handed	Right-arm medium	
Dane van Niekerk	South Africa	14 May 1993 (aged 30)	Right-handed	Right-arm leg break	Overseas player; May to September 2024; ruled out for the entire season due to personal reasons.
Wicket-keepers
Amara Carr	England	17 April 1994 (aged 30)	Right-handed	—	
Ariana Dowse	England	8 February 2001 (aged 23)	Right-handed	—	
Jessica Olorenshaw	England	27 January 2005 (aged 19)	Right-handed	Right-arm medium	
Bowlers
Eva Gray	England	24 May 2000 (aged 23)	Right-handed	Right-arm medium	
Nicola Hancock	England	8 November 1995 (aged 28)	Right-handed	Right-arm medium	Overseas player; April to June 2024
Esmae MacGregor	England	31 July 2004 (aged 19)	Right-handed	Right-arm medium	
Abtaha Maqsood	Scotland	11 June 1999 (aged 24)	Right-handed	Right-arm leg break	
Sophie Munro	England	31 August 2001 (aged 22)	Right-handed	Right-arm medium	On loan from The Blaze, May to September 2024
Charley Phillips	England	8 May 2003 (aged 20)	Right-handed	Right-arm medium	Loaned out to The Blaze, September 2024
Mady Villiers	England	26 August 1998 (aged 25)	Right-handed	Right-arm off break	

== Rachael Heyhoe Flint Trophy ==
=== Season standings ===
Pos	Team	Pld	W	L	T	NR	BP	Pts	NRR
1	Northern Diamonds (Q)	14	9	4	0	1	3	41	0.097
2	South East Stars (Q)	14	9	5	0	0	4	40	0.246
3	Southern Vipers (Q)	14	7	6	0	1	4	34	0.534
4	Sunrisers (Q)	14	7	6	0	1	4	34	−0.122
5	The Blaze	14	7	6	0	1	1	31	−0.176
6	North West Thunder	14	5	8	0	1	3	25	−0.013
7	Central Sparks	14	5	8	0	1	3	25	−0.299
8	Western Storm	14	4	10	0	0	2	18	−0.211

Source: ESPNCricinfo

advanced to the Semi-finals

=== Fixtures ===
20 April 2024
10:30
Scorecard

Western Storm; 114 (30.4 overs)	v	Sunrisers; 116/2 (33.4 overs)
Nat Wraith 42 (52); Nicola Hancock 3/15 (5.4 overs)		Grace Scrivens 63* (98); Amanda-Jade Wellington 1/24 (9 overs)

Sunrisers won by 8 wickets
Sophia Gardens, Cardiff
Umpires: Anna Harris and Ian Blackwell

- Sunrisers won the toss and elected to bowl.
- Points: Sunrisers 5, Western Storm 0

24 April 2024
10:30
Scorecard

North West Thunder; 292/5 (50 overs)	v	Sunrisers; 150 (40.1 overs)
Katie Mack 100 (110); Kate Coppack 2/32 (7 overs)		Jodi Grewcock 38 (47); Kate Cross 3/21 (8.1 overs)

North West Thunder won by 142 runs
Old Trafford Cricket Ground, Manchester
Umpires: Amy Clark and Simon Widdup

- Sunrisers won the toss and elected to bowl.
- Points: North West Thunder 5, Sunrisers 0

27 April 2024
10:30
Scorecard

The Blaze; 87 (31.3 overs)	v	Sunrisers; 91/3 (20.5 overs)
Nadine de Klerk 15 (22); Mady Villiers 3/18 (9 overs)		Grace Scrivens 46* (50); Lucy Higham 1/10 (3 overs)

Sunrisers won by 7 wickets
County Ground, Chelmsford
Umpires: Fiona Richards and Simon Widdup

- Sunrisers won the toss and elected to bowl.
- Points: Sunrisers 5, The Blaze 0

1 May 2024
10:30
Scorecard

Central Sparks; 213 (50 overs)	v	Sunrisers; 214/5 (39.4 overs)
Abigail Freeborn 93 (145); Kate Coppack 3/26 (8 overs)		Grace Scrivens 118* (123); Bethan Ellis 2/38 (9 overs)

Sunrisers won by 5 wickets
Chester Road North Ground, Kidderminster
Umpires: Joanne Ibbotson and Naeem Ashraf

- Sunrisers won the toss and elected to bowl.
- Points: Sunrisers 5, Central Sparks 0

4 May 2024
10:30
Scorecard

Sunrisers; 222/9 (50 overs)	v	South East Stars; 223/5 (47.5 overs)
Florence Miller 30 (33); Kalea Moore 2/42 (9 overs)		Sophia Dunkley 67 (89); Mady Villiers 2/43 (10 overs)

South East Stars won by 5 wickets
County Ground, Northampton
Umpires: Neil Bainton and Joanne Ibbotson

- Sunrisers won the toss and elected to bat.
- Points: South East Stars 4, Sunrisers 0

8 May 2024
10:30
Scorecard

Southern Vipers; 211/9 (50 overs)	v	Sunrisers; 212/7 (49.3 overs)
Georgia Elwiss 53 (63); Nicola Hancock 3/45 (10 overs)		Jodi Grewcock 56 (56); Charli Knott 3/35 (10 overs)

Sunrisers won by 3 wickets
Brunton Memorial Ground, Radlett
Umpires: Gabi Brown and Jack Shantry

- Sunrisers won the toss and elected to bowl.
- Points: Sunrisers 4, Southern Vipers 0

30 June 2024
10:30
Scorecard

Sunrisers; 253 (47.3 overs)	v	North West Thunder; 224 (45.2 overs)
Jo Gardner 63 (78); Hannah Jones 4/50 (10 overs)		Emma Lamb 48 (42); Sophie Munro 5/25 (6.2 overs)

Sunrisers won by 30 runs (DLS)
County Ground, Chelmsford
Umpires: Julia Jarvis and Simon Widdup

- Sunrisers won the toss and elected to bat.
- Match reduced to 48 overs per side due to rain.
- North West Thunder target adjusted to 255 runs from 48 overs.
- Points: Sunrisers 4, North West Thunder 0

7 July 2024
10:30
Scorecard

Central Sparks; 27/0 (6.3 overs)	v	Sunrisers
Evelyn Jones 14* (17)

No result
Brunton Memorial Ground, Radlett
Umpires: Anthony Harris and Fiona Richards

- Sunrisers won the toss and elected to bowl.
- No further play was possible due to rain.
- Points: Central Sparks 2, Sunrisers 2

10 July 2024
10:30
Scorecard

Sunrisers; 109 (30.5 overs)	v	Northern Diamonds; 111/6 (24.4 overs)
Jo Gardner 21 (27); Beth Langston 6/24 (10 overs)		Erin Burns 35* (36); Kate Coppack 3/35 (7 overs)

Northern Diamonds won by 4 wickets
Clifton Park, York
Umpires: Jasmine Naeem and Peter Hartley

- Northern Diamonds won the toss and elected to bowl.
- Points: Northern Diamonds 5, Sunrisers 0

14 July 2024
10:30
Scorecard

South East Stars; 258 (49.5 overs)	v	Sunrisers; 214 (47.5 overs)
Bryony Smith 84 (111); Jodi Grewcock 3/43 (10 overs)		Alice Macleod 44 (54); Danielle Gregory 3/47 (10 overs)

South East Stars won by 44 runs
County Ground, Beckenham
Umpires: Ben Peverall and Rose Dovey

- South East Stars won the toss and elected to bat.
- Points: South East Stars 4, Sunrisers 0

26 August 2024
10:30
Scorecard

Northern Diamonds; 188/9 (50 overs)	v	Sunrisers; 189/7 (38 overs)
Sterre Kalis 36 (41); Mady Villiers 4/36 (10 overs)		Grace Scrivens 56 (74); Katherine Fraser 3/37 (8 overs)

Sunrisers won by 3 wickets
County Ground, Chelmsford
Umpires: Chris Watts and Jasmine Naeem

- Northern Diamonds won the toss and elected to bat.
- Points: Sunrisers 5, Northern Diamonds 0

31 August 2024
10:30
Scorecard

Sunrisers; 245 (49.4 overs)	v	The Blaze; 249/4 (43.3 overs)
Cordelia Griffith 65 (73); Kathryn Bryce 4/41 (8.4 overs)		Kathryn Bryce 87* (95); Eva Gray 2/29 (10 overs)

The Blaze won by 6 wickets
County Ground, Derby
Umpires: Joanne Ibbotson and Surendiran Shanmugam

- Sunrisers won the toss and elected to bat.
- Points: The Blaze 4, Sunrisers 0

4 September 2024
10:30
Scorecard

Western Storm; 180 (45.5 overs)	v	Sunrisers; 150 (39.3 overs)
Amanda-Jade Wellington 45* (42); Sophie Munro 3/42 (10 overs)		Alice Macleod 48 (61); Chloe Skelton 5/29 (9.3 overs)

Western Storm won by 30 runs
Brunton Memorial Ground, Radlett
Umpires: Nigel Llong and Rose Dovey

- Sunrisers won the toss and elected to bowl.
- Points: Western Storm 4, Sunrisers 0

7 September 2024
10:30
Scorecard

Sunrisers; 281 (50 overs)	v	Southern Vipers; 88/8 (10 overs)
Cordelia Griffith 55 (68); Naomi Dattani 5/51 (8 overs)		Ella McCaughan 15 (10); Eva Gray 2/22 (2 overs)

Sunrisers won by 5 runs (DLS)
Rose Bowl, Southampton
Umpires: Gabi Brown and Ian Blackwell

- Southern Vipers won the toss and elected to bowl.
- Southern Vipers innings reduced to 10 overs due to rain; target was 94.
- Points: Sunrisers 4, Southern Vipers 0

==== Semi-final ====
14 September 2024
10:30
Scorecard

Northern Diamonds; 232/8 (50 overs)	v	Sunrisers; 234/3 (43.4 overs)
Emma Marlow 63 (102); Eva Gray 2/52 (10 overs)		Cordelia Griffith 68 (89); Katie Levick 2/45 (9 overs)

Sunrisers won by 7 wickets
Headingley Cricket Ground, Leeds
Umpires: Chris Watts and Rose Dovey

- Northern Diamonds won the toss and elected to bat.

==== Final ====
21 September 2024
10:30
Scorecard

South East Stars; 212 (46.2 overs)	v	Sunrisers; 123/3 (25 overs)
Alice Davidson-Richards 93 (105); Kate Coppack 4/27 (10 overs)		Cordelia Griffith 57 (68); Kalea Moore 2/29 (8 overs)

Sunrisers won by 27 runs (DLS)
Grace Road, Leicester
Umpires: Jack Shantry and James Tredwell
Player of the match: Kate Coppack (Sunrisers)

- Sunrisers won the toss and elected to bowl.
- No further play was possible due to rain.

=== Tournament statistics ===
==== Batting ====
Player	Matches	Innings	Runs	Average	High score	100s	50s
Grace Scrivens	16	15	553	50.27	118*	1	4
Cordelia Griffith	13	13	420	32.30	68	0	4
Jodi Grewcock	16	15	370	32.30	68	0	2
Jo Gardner	16	12	221	18.41	63	0	1
Alice Macleod	10	9	218	36.33	53	0	1
Florence Miller	16	11	204	22.66	47*	0	0

Source: ESPN Cricinfo Qualification: 200 runs.

==== Bowling ====
Player	Matches	Overs	Wickets	Average	Economy	BBI	5wi
Kate Coppack	16	96.3	19	21.84	4.30	4/27	0
Jodi Grewcock	16	120.4	19	25.94	4.08	3/28	0
Mady Villiers	13	103.0	18	26.61	4.65	4/36	0
Sophie Munro	8	42.2	14	14.14	4.67	5/25	1
Nicola Hancock	6	50.0	14	15.00	4.20	2/15	0
Eva Gray	10	74.0	12	27.91	4.52	2/22	0

Source: ESPN Cricinfo Qualification: 10 wickets.

== Charlotte Edwards Cup ==
=== Season standings ===
Pos	Team	Pld	W	L	T	NR	BP	Pts	NRR
1	The Blaze (Q)	10	9	1	0	0	3	39	0.606
2	South East Stars (Q)	10	7	2	0	1	4	34	0.309
3	Southern Vipers (Q)	10	6	4	0	0	2	26	1.001
4	Central Sparks (Q)	10	6	4	0	0	2	26	0.402
5	North West Thunder	10	3	6	0	1	1	15	−0.727
6	Northern Diamonds	10	3	7	0	0	1	13	−0.067
7	Western Storm	10	2	6	0	2	1	13	−0.659
8	Sunrisers	10	2	8	0	0	0	8	−1.073

Source: ESPNCricinfo

advanced to the Semi-finals

=== Fixtures ===
19 May 2024
14:30
Scorecard

Sunrisers; 138/6 (20 overs)	v	Central Sparks; 142/3 (14 overs)
Alice Macleod 54 (39); Hannah Baker 2/21 (4 overs)		Davina Perrin 79* (48); Mady Villiers 2/37 (3 overs)

Central Sparks won by 7 wickets
New Road, Worcester
Umpires: Fiona Richards and Simon Widdup

- Central Sparks won the toss and elected to bowl.
- Points: Central Sparks 5, Sunrisers 0

24 May 2024
18:30
Scorecard

Southern Vipers; 171/2 (20 overs)	v	Sunrisers; 152/5 (20 overs)
Georgia Elwiss 73* (57); Mady Villiers 1/20 (4 overs)		Jo Gardner 79* (61); Mary Taylor 2/29 (4 overs)

Southern Vipers won by 19 runs
County Ground, Chelmsford
Umpires: Gabi Brown and Simon Widdup

- Sunrisers won the toss and elected to bowl.
- Points: Southern Vipers 4, Sunrisers 0

27 May 2024
14:30
Scorecard

Sunrisers; 134/5 (20 overs)	v	Southern Vipers; 131/6 (20 overs)
Jo Gardner 42 (39); Freya Davies 3/22 (4 overs)		Charli Knott 50 (41); Sophie Munro 4/27 (4 overs)

Sunrisers won by 3 runs
Arundel Castle Cricket Ground, Arundel
Umpires: Ben Peverall and Rose Dovey

- Southern Vipers won the toss and elected to bowl.
- Points: Sunrisers 4, Southern Vipers 0

31 May 2024
14:30
Scorecard

Western Storm; 134/8 (20 overs)	v	Sunrisers; 106 (17.4 overs)
Sophie Luff 41 (34); Mady Villiers 2/20 (4 overs)		Florence Miller 28 (30); Ellie Anderson 4/9 (2.4 overs)

Western Storm won by 28 runs
County Ground, Taunton
Umpires: Ben Peverall and Gabi Brown

- Sunrisers won the toss and elected to bowl.
- Points: Western Storm 5, Sunrisers 0

2 June 2024
11:30
Scorecard

Northern Diamonds; 123/8 (20 overs)	v	Sunrisers; 126/6 (20 overs)
Hollie Armitage 39 (40); Mady Villiers 2/22 (4 overs)		Grace Scrivens 64* (57); Hollie Armitage 3/16 (3 overs)

Sunrisers won by 4 wickets
County Ground, Northampton
Umpires: Jasmine Naeem and Simon Widdup

- Sunrisers won the toss and elected to bowl.
- Points: Sunrisers 4, Northern Diamonds 0

6 June 2024
14:15
Scorecard

Sunrisers; 116/8 (20 overs)	v	South East Stars; 118/4 (15 overs)
Florence Miller 39* (45); Emma Jones 2/13 (2 overs)		Paige Scholfield 50* (35); Jodi Grewcock 2/18 (3 overs)

South East Stars won by 6 wickets
Lord's, London
Umpires: Jack Shantry and Joanne Ibbotson

- South East Stars won the toss and elected to bowl.
- Points: South East Stars 5, Sunrisers 0

9 June 2024
13:00
Scorecard

Sunrisers; 151/9 (20 overs)	v	North West Thunder; 155/5 (19.3 overs)
Alice Macleod 60 (43); Sophie Ecclestone 3/18 (4 overs)		Seren Smale 39* (33); Eva Gray 2/28 (4 overs)

North West Thunder won by 5 wickets
Stanley Park, Blackpool
Umpires: Jasmine Naeem and Peter Hartley

- Sunrisers won the toss and elected to bat.
- Points: North West Thunder 4, Sunrisers 0

13 June 2024
14:15
Scorecard

Sunrisers; 137/7 (20 overs)	v	The Blaze; 140/2 (15.1 overs)
Grace Scrivens 42 (38); Heather Graham 2/22 (4 overs)		Kathryn Bryce 57* (37); Eva Gray 1/24 (3 overs)

The Blaze won by 8 wickets
Lord's, London
Umpires: Gabi Brown and James Tredwell

- The Blaze won the toss and elected to bowl.
- Points: The Blaze 5, Sunrisers 0

15 June 2024
14:30
Scorecard

South East Stars; 153/4 (18 overs)	v	Sunrisers; 111/5 (15.5 overs)
Georgia Redmayne 38* (40); Mady Villiers 2/23 (4 overs)		Grace Scrivens 62* (48); Danielle Gregory 2/21 (3 overs)

South East Stars won by 19 runs (DLS)
The Oval, London
Umpires: Ben Peverall and Gabi Brown

- Sunrisers won the toss and elected to bowl.
- Points: South East Stars 4, Sunrisers 0

19 June 2024
11:30
Scorecard

Western Storm; 142/7 (20 overs)	v	Sunrisers; 131/9 (20 overs)
Heather Knight 66 (43); Sophie Munro 4/23 (4 overs)		Jodi Grewcock 40 (34); Amanda-Jade Wellington 2/24 (4 overs)

Western Storm won by 11 runs
County Ground, Chelmsford
Umpires: Julia Jarvis and Rob White

- Western Storm won the toss and elected to bat.
- Points: Western Storm 4, Sunrisers 0

=== Tournament statistics ===
==== Batting ====
Player	Matches	Innings	Runs	Average	High score	100s	50s
Jo Gardner	10	10	260	32.50	79*	0	1
Grace Scrivens	10	10	244	30.50	64*	0	2
Alice Macleod	10	10	165	16.50	60	0	2

Source: ESPN Cricinfo Qualification: 150 runs.

==== Bowling ====
Player	Matches	Overs	Wickets	Average	Economy	BBI	5wi
Sophie Munro	7	26.0	12	15.75	7.26	4/23	0
Mady Villiers	10	38.0	11	24.72	7.15	2/20	0

Source: ESPN Cricinfo Qualification: 10 wickets.

== Season statistics ==
=== Batting ===
Player	Rachael Heyhoe Flint Trophy								Charlotte Edwards Cup							
Player	Matches	Innings	Runs	High score	Average	Strike rate	100s	50s	Matches	Innings	Runs	High score	Average	Strike rate	100s	50s
Amara Carr	16	11	111	42	12.33	55.22	0	0	10	6	35	14	7.00	71.42	0	0
Kate Coppack	16	8	46	17*	9.20	54.76	0	0	4	–	–	–	–	–	–	–
Ariana Dowse	4	4	28	13	7.00	41.79	0	0	–	–	–	–	–	–	–	–
Jo Gardner	16	12	221	53	18.41	61.55	0	1	10	10	260	79*	32.50	106.99	0	1
Eva Gray	10	7	102	37	17.00	68.91	0	0	10	7	34	12	11.33	85.00	0	0
Jodi Grewcock	16	15	370	63*	28.46	72.12	0	2	10	8	134	40	16.75	108.94	0	0
Cordelia Griffith	13	13	420	68	32.30	75.26	0	4	5	5	33	26	6.60	76.74	0	0
Nicola Hancock	6	3	37	16	18.50	64.91	0	0	8	5	12	6	4.00	120.00	0	0
Esmae MacGregor	6	2	20	20*	–	43.47	0	0	–	–	–	–	–	–	–	–
Alice Macleod	10	9	218	53	36.33	80.74	0	1	10	10	165	60	16.50	128.90	0	2
Abtaha Maqsood	4	3	2	1*	1.00	16.66	0	0	1	–	–	–	–	–	–	–
Florence Miller	16	11	204	47*	22.66	79.06	0	0	10	9	110	39*	22.00	93.22	0	0
Sophie Munro	8	5	55	20	13.75	70.51	0	0	7	4	19	9*	9.50	105.55	0	0
Grace Scrivens	16	15	553	118*	50.27	71.07	1	4	10	10	244	64*	30.50	108.44	0	2
Amuruthaa Surenkumar	6	4	55	25	13.75	58.51	0	0	5	4	53	32	13.25	100.00	0	0
Mady Villiers	13	10	122	35	13.55	96.06	0	0	10	10	131	44	14.55	116.96	0	0
Source: ESPN Cricinfo

=== Bowling ===
Player	Rachael Heyhoe Flint Trophy							Charlotte Edwards Cup						
Player	Matches	Overs	Wickets	Average	Economy	BBI	5wi	Matches	Overs	Wickets	Average	Economy	BBI	5wi
Kate Coppack	16	96.3	19	21.84	1.30	4/27	0	4	10.0	1	79.00	7.90	1/18	0
Jo Gardner	16	19.3	2	54.00	5.53	2/13	0	10	3.0	0	–	7.33	–	0
Eva Gray	10	74.0	12	27.91	4.52	2/22	0	10	36.0	9	31.55	7.88	2/28	0
Jodi Grewcock	16	120.4	19	25.94	4.08	3/28	0	10	35.0	5	42.60	6.08	2/18	0
Nicola Hancock	6	50.0	14	15.00	4.20	3/15	0	8	22.0	4	49.00	8.90	2/30	0
Esmae MacGregor	6	21.0	3	37.00	5.28	1/16	0	–	–	–	–	–	–	–
Abtaha Maqsood	4	24.5	3	40.00	4.83	2/19	0	1	2.0	1	12.00	6.00	1/12	0
Sophie Munro	8	42.2	14	14.14	4.67	5/25	1	7	26.0	12	15.75	7.26	4/23	0
Grace Scrivens	16	64.1	4	73.50	4.58	2/40	0	10	4.3	0	–	12.66	–	0
Amuruthaa Surenkumar	6	16.0	1	72.00	4.50	1/17	0	5	5.1	1	49.00	9.48	1/19	0
Mady Villiers	13	103.0	18	26.61	4.65	4/36	0	10	38.0	11	24.72	7.15	2/20	0
Source: ESPN Cricinfo

=== Fielding ===
Player	Rachael Heyhoe Flint Trophy			Charlotte Edwards Cup		
Player	Matches	Innings	Catches	Matches	Innings	Catches
Kate Coppack	16	16	2	4	4	1
Ariana Dowse	4	4	2	–	–	–
Jo Gardner	16	16	7	10	10	4
Eva Gray	10	10	3	10	10	1
Jodi Grewcock	16	16	4	10	10	2
Cordelia Griffith	13	13	2	5	5	3
Nicola Hancock	6	6	1	8	8	2
Esmae MacGregor	6	6	3	–	–	–
Alice Macleod	10	10	3	10	10	2
Abtaha Maqsood	4	4	0	1	1	1
Florence Miller	16	16	4	10	10	2
Sophie Munro	8	8	2	7	7	0
Grace Scrivens	16	16	5	10	10	3
Amuruthaa Surenkumar	6	6	0	5	5	1
Mady Villiers	13	13	7	10	10	2
Source: ESPN Cricinfo

=== Wicket-keeping ===
Player	Rachael Heyhoe Flint Trophy				Charlotte Edwards Cup			
Player	Matches	Innings	Catches	Stumpings	Matches	Innings	Catches	Stumpings
Amara Carr	16	16	13	4	10	10	3	6
Source: ESPN Cricinfo
