= Dolphin (surname) =

Dolphin is a surname. Notable people with the surname include:

- Arthur Dolphin (1885–1942), English first-class cricketer
- Bill Dolphin (1881–1969), Australian rules footballer
- Charles B. Dolphin (1888–1969), British-Canadian architect
- David Dolphin (born 1940), Canadian biochemist
- David Dolphin (cricketer) (born 1950), Zimbabwean cricketer
- Frank Dolphin (born 1959), Irish businessman
- James Dolphin (born 1983), New Zealand sprinter
- John Dolphin (disambiguation), several people
- Tom Dolphin (born 1978/9), British anaesthetist
