= Ravi Singh =

Ravi Singh may refer to:

- Ravi Singh (businessman), Indian-American entrepreneur, author, and former politician
- Ravi Singh (humanitarian) (born 1969), British-Indian humanitarian
- Ravi Singh (cricketer) (born 1974), Indian-born cricketer
- Ravi Inder Singh (cricketer) (born 1987), Indian cricketer
- Ravi Inder Singh (industrialist) (born 1940), Indian industrialist and politician
