= John Dolphin (disambiguation) =

John Dolphin (1905–1973) was a British Army officer, engineer and inventor

John Dolphin may also refer to:

- John Dolphin (cricketer) (1804–1889), English cricketer
- John Dolphin (music producer) (1902–1958), American businessman and music producer
- John Dolphin (Oxford University cricketer) (1837–1899), English cricketer
