= Anthony Gardner =

Anthony Gardner may refer to:

- Anthony Gardner (footballer) (born 1980), English footballer
- Anthony W. Gardner (1820–1885), president of Liberia
- Anthony L. Gardner (born 1963), American politician and ambassador

== See also ==
- Tony Gardner (born 1964), English actor, comedian and doctor
- Tony Gardner (designer) (born 1965) , American makeup designer, special effects designer and puppeteer
- Tony Gardner (cricketer), Canadian cricketer
- Antony Gardner (1927–2011), British politician
