= Southrepps =

Village in Norfolk, England

Coordinates: 52.87°N 1.35°E

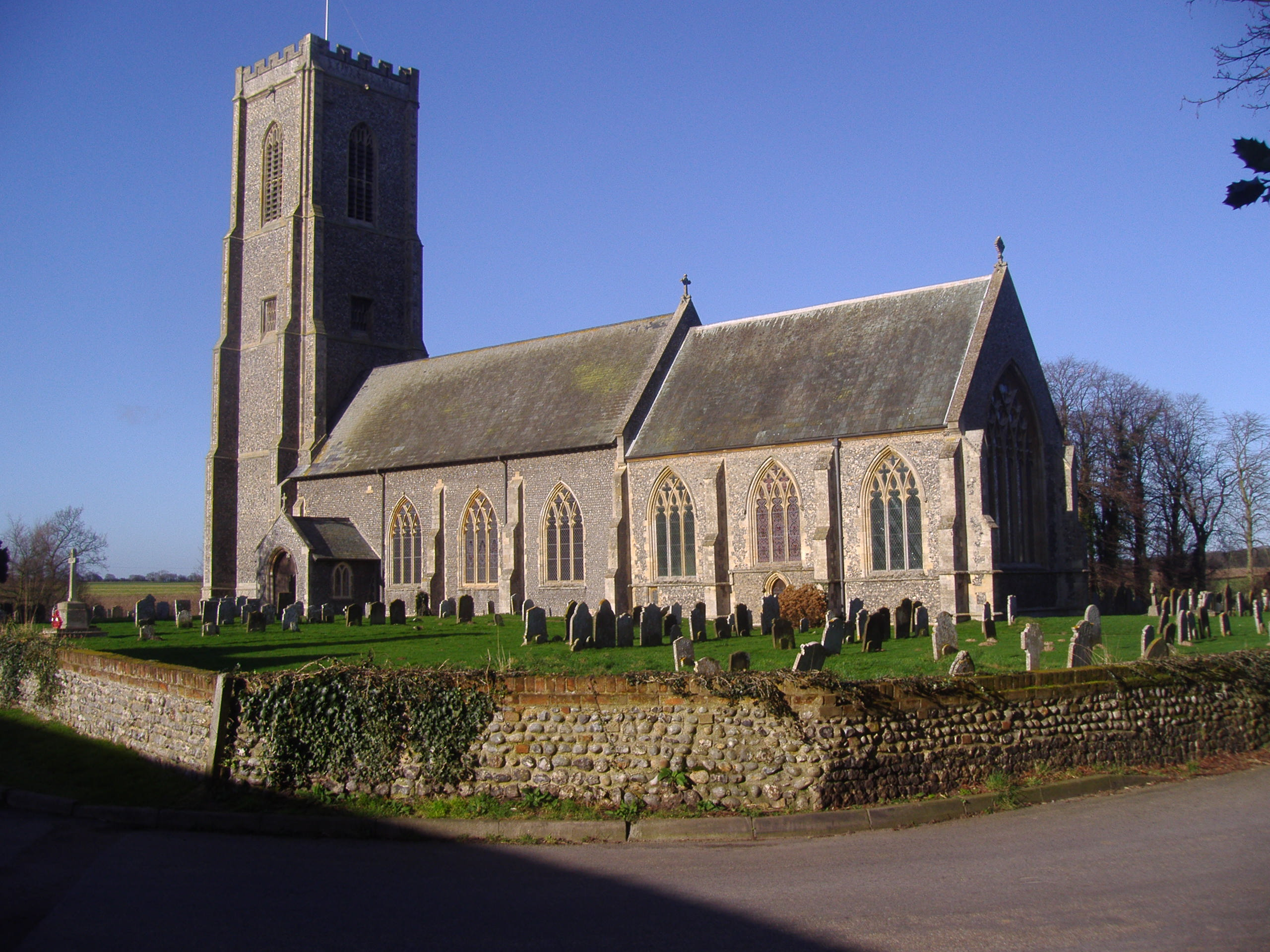
- St James' Parish Church, Southrepps

- Location within Norfolk
- Area: 8.45 km^{2} (3.26 sq mi)
- Population: 815 (2011 census)
  - Density: 96/km^{2} (250/sq mi)
- OS grid reference: TG256367
  - London: 136 miles (219 km)
- Civil parish: Southrepps
- District: North Norfolk
- Shire county: Norfolk
- Region: East
- Country: England
- Sovereign state: United Kingdom
- Post town: NORWICH
- Postcode district: NR11
- Dialling code: 01263
- Police: Norfolk
- Fire: Norfolk
- Ambulance: East of England
- UK Parliament: North Norfolk

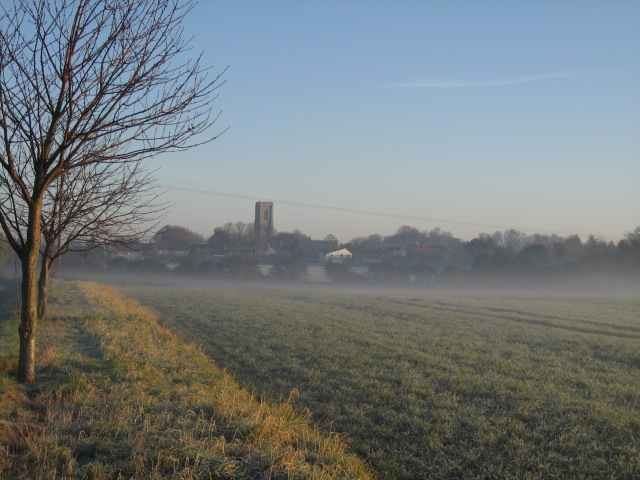
Village from the south

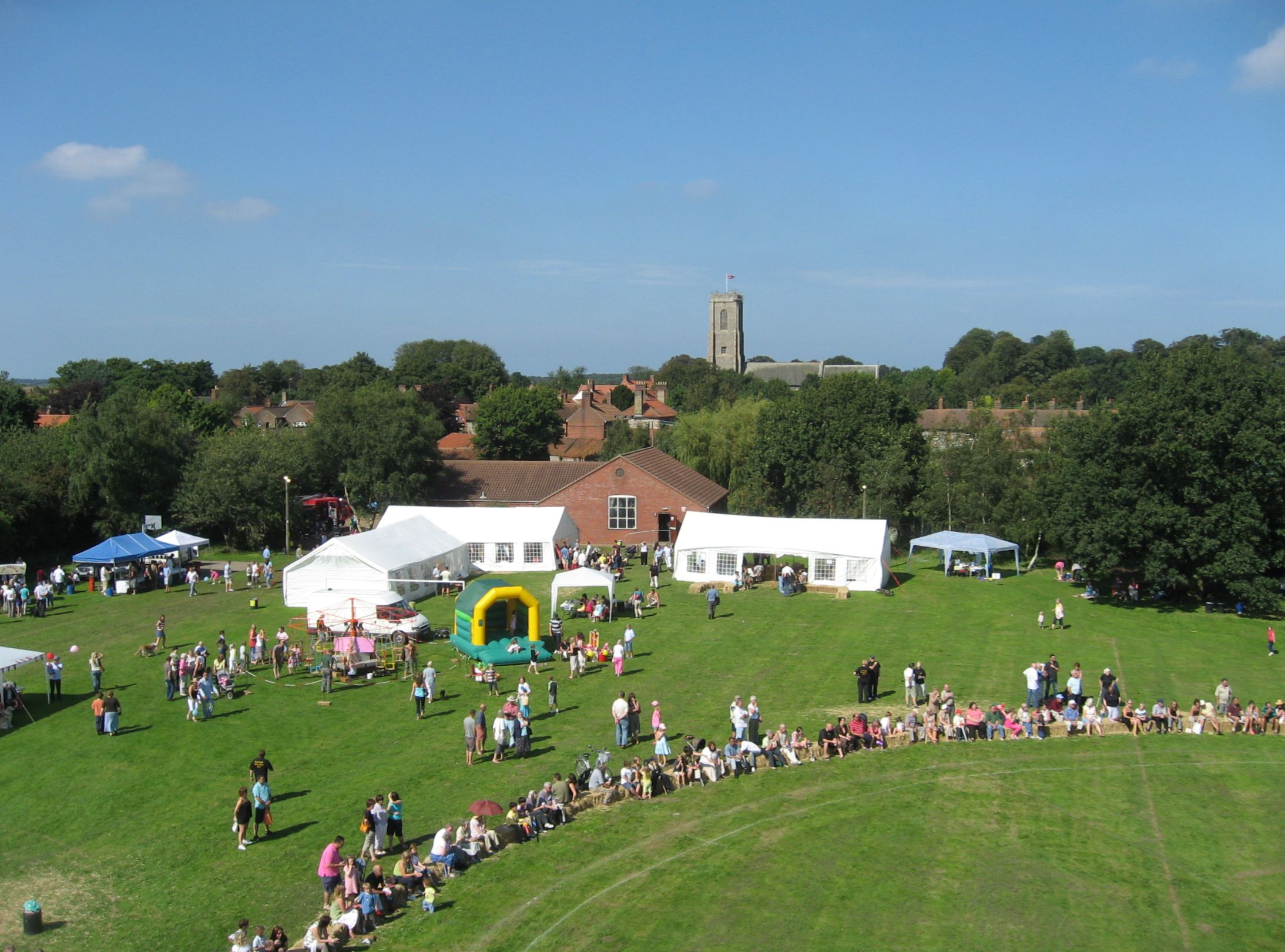
Village Fayre, August 2007

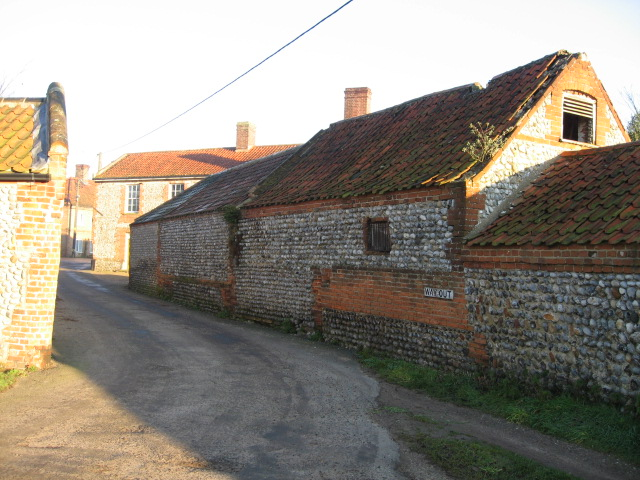
Traditional local building materials in the old abattoir and butcher's shop, Southrepps

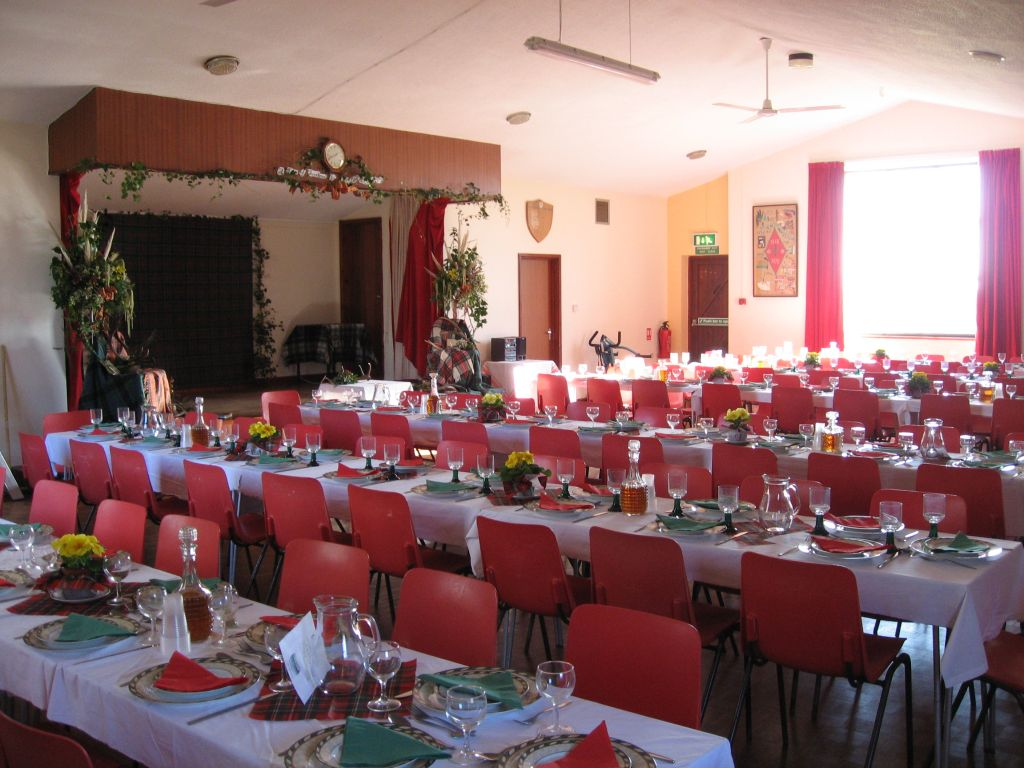
Inside the Village Hall

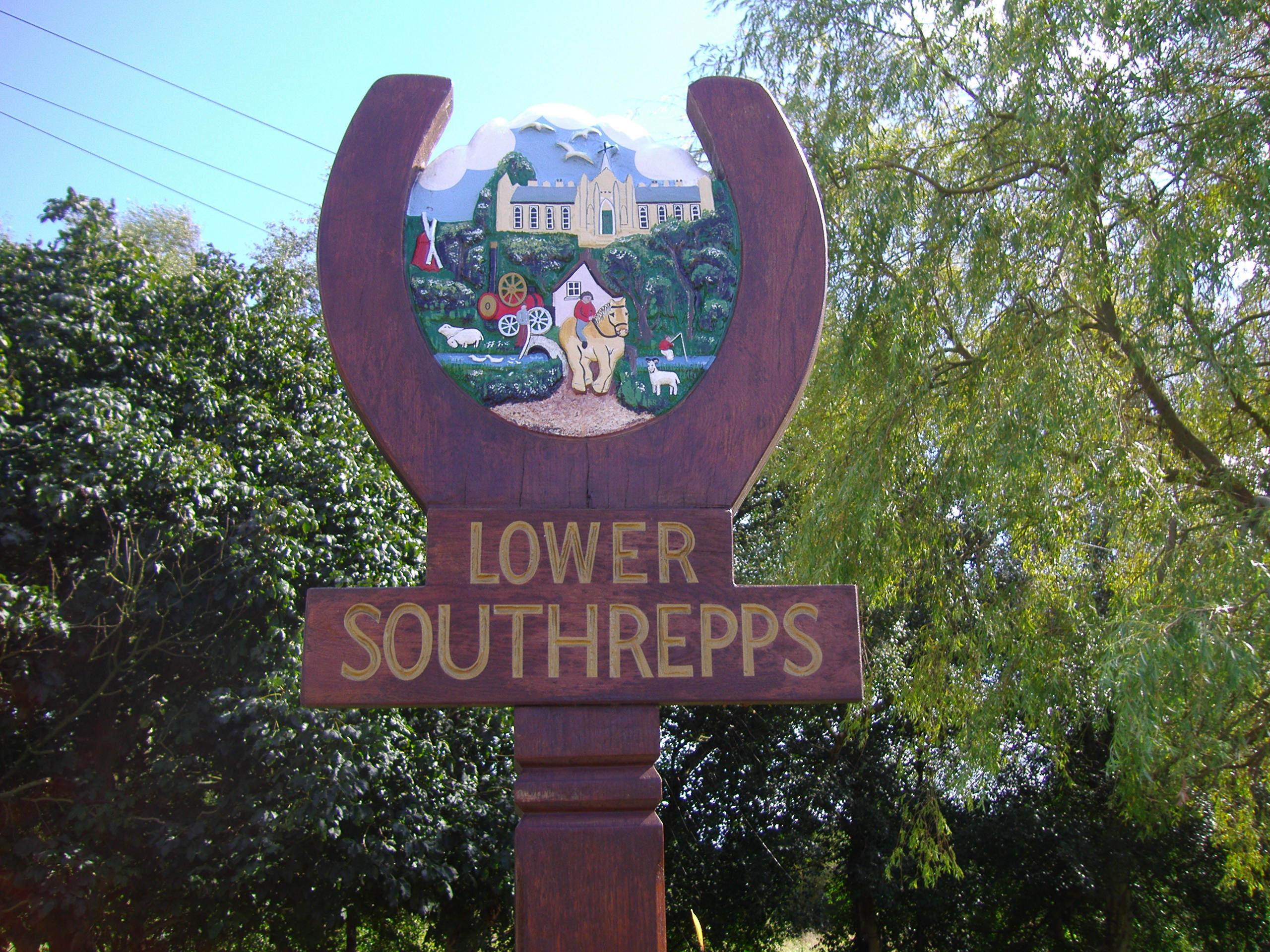
Lower Southrepps Village sign

Southrepps is a village and a civil parish in the English county of Norfolk. The village is 5.2 miles (8.4 km) southeast of Cromer, 21.9 miles (35.2 km) north of Norwich and 136.0 miles (218.9 km) north of London. The village lies northeast of the A149 between Kings Lynn and Great Yarmouth. The nearest railway station is at Gunton for the Bittern Line which runs between Sheringham, Cromer and Norwich. The nearest airport is Norwich International Airport. The village is close to the sea and surrounded by rich agricultural land.

== Upper and Lower Southrepps ==
The village is in two halves, separated by a mile of farmland. The halves are known as Upper Southrepps and Lower Southrepps (Upper Street and Lower Street on Ordnance Survey maps).

== Geography ==
Southrepps is built on a low-rise mix of glacial sands and gravels, with expanses of rich till formed from the so-called Cromer Forest Bed created in a warmer period when a great meandering river fringed rank forest vegetation. This surface geology makes for well-drained and fertile soils. Beneath these younger rocks lie chalk beds which come to the surface in a line stretching south from Weybourne and can also be seen on the village's nearest beach at low tide in a chalk pavement between Trimingham and Sidestrand. The beach here is littered with flint cobbles formed into nodules by chemical replacement of the chalk and eroded into cobbles by wave action. These durable and abundant flint cobbles were collected from the beaches and used as decorative and structural materials in village buildings. Local clays and imported orange pantiles from the Low Countries were used for roofing.

Being in the east, sheltered from most of the extreme weather of the Atlantic, from where most of Britain's rainfall comes, Southrepps has amongst the lowest rainfall in the UK, at less than 500 mm per year. The area has a mean temperature of 10 °C, second only to southwest and southeast England. With a south to west wind blowing in summer the temperature easily surpasses 20 °C and exceeds 30 °C on at least a few days every year. Severe frosts are rare because of the proximity of the sea, although in December 2011 the village recorded a low of −13.8 °C. With over 1,550 hours of sunshine annually, it is behind only the south-coast counties and Suffolk, though it can be plagued by low sea cloud in spring and early summer when water vapour held in warm, moist continental air from the east condenses into fog over the comparatively cold North Sea. The village can be in bright sunshine while the lanes to the coast at Trimingham or Overstrand are shrouded in thick mist. The village has several weather stations, one of which is on the Met Office website.

Climate and geology have combined to make the area highly productive in various forms of agriculture, arable and sheep farming being predominant from the Middle Ages, though the Black Death and Great Plague led to serious falls in activity. During the Second World War agriculture rapidly intensified, and it has remained very intensive since with the establishment of large fields for cereal and root crop growing. Many uprooted trees and hedgerows, however, have been systematically replaced, restoring the traditional appearance of the landscape, due to the efforts of a small number of local farmers and landowners.

== Village amenities ==
The village has two shops and one public house. Its village hall provides a venue for a number of regular users and special events such as receptions for weddings, christenings and funerals, annual village events and other celebrations. It is the meeting place for the Southrepps Society of local historians. The parish church, St James, provides for a range of different worship styles.

Southrepps has a primary school, Antingham & Southrepps CP.

== Organisations ==
The Southrepps and District Branch of the Royal British Legion has a membership of some 30 plus. It meets quarterly at the Vernon Arms.

Local bell-ringers meet and practise at 7.30 pm on Wednesday at the parish church.

The Southrepps Society was formed in 1979 to celebrate and conserve all that is best in Southrepps. The Memories Project started in 2006, its objective to present the Society's archive in an easily accessible form and to engage the village in these community-based Memories Events and Exhibitions. Its current project is a detailed survey of the history of agricultural land use in the area which the local school is participating in.

There is a long-established Southrepps and District Women's Group. The group meets on the third Tuesday of every month at nearby Thorpe Market Village Hall. There is also a Women's Reading Group.

The Village Fayre Committee came together to organise the highly acclaimed Summer Fayres of 2007 and 2009, the first for a number of years. They succeeded in attracting a huge number of visitors and raised substantial funds for local charities and for pump-priming other events aimed at bringing villagers together, such as the Carols-Round-The-Four-Village-Trees event during December which itself raises funds for a local children's hospice.

Every summer the Southrepps Classical Music Festival brings international singers and players to the village to showcase a wide repertoire of classical genres. The musicians are hosted by 30 village families.

== Southrepps Common ==
Southrepps Common is a biological Site of Special Scientific Interest and a Local Nature Reserve. It covers an area of 12.4 hectares. It can be found in Lower Southrepps. The site supports woodland, reedbeds and many species of grass and wild flowers. There is an 800-metre boardwalk which allows access to the most interesting and important parts of the reserve for wheelchairs and all other members of the public. The diverse habitats support an exceptional range of species and it also has "Special Area of Conservation" status. Across the site there are over 160 plant species including some small orchid species.

List of plants include:

- Parnassus grass (Parnassia)
- Bog pimpernel (Lysimachia tenella, syn. Anagalis tenella)
- Flea sedge (Carex pulicaris)
- Common cottongrass (Eriophorum angustifolium)
- Marsh helleborine (Epipactis palustris)
- Bogbean (Menyanthes)
- Marsh marigold (Caltha palustris)

There is a large variety of nesting birds across the reserve such as reed warblers, reed bunting, and sedge warbler. The woodland areas are habitat of such birds as greater spotted woodpecker, nuthatch, treecreeper, barn owl and tawny owl. The stream that runs through the common is called Fox's Beck. The stream is shallow, free-flowing and supports several species of snail, caddis fly and dragonfly, with water voles living along the banks. Fox's Beck and the common until quite recently had common rights attached to certain properties in the Southrepps and other rights of common included turbary (peat cutting), estovers (firewood and bedding for livestock) and piscary (fishing). Livestock could be grazed and many other natural resources were exploited, such as reed cutting for thatch; alder and hazel were coppiced for tool handles, twigs were collected for the use of broom heads and willow was cut for use in screens.

== Notable people ==
- John Dolphin (1837–1899), cricketer and clergyman, born at Southrepps
- Claughton Pellew (born 1890 at Redruth, Cornwall; died 1966 at Southrepps) was a painter, wood engraver and etcher.
