= Dave Loudon =

Scottish cricketer

Personal information
- Full name: William David Grafton Loudon
- Born: 22 May 1954 (age 72); Lanark, Lanarkshire, Scotland
- Batting: Right-handed
- Bowling: Right-arm medium

Domestic team information
- Years: Team
- 1981–1982: Scotland

Career statistics
Competition	First-class	List A
Matches	1	6
Runs scored	21	78
Batting average	21.00	15.60
100s/50s	–/–	–/–
Top score	21	22
Balls bowled	61	276
Wickets	3	2
Bowling average	3.66	92.00
5 wickets in innings	–	–
10 wickets in match	–	–
Best bowling	3/4	1/32
Catches/stumpings	1/–	1/–
- Source: Cricinfo, 17 June 2022

William David Grafton Loudon (born 22 May 1954) is a Scottish former cricketer.

Loudon was born at Lanark in May 1954. He was educated at the Edinburgh Academy. A club cricketer for Edinburgh Academical Cricket Club, he made his debut for Scotland in a List A one-day match against Yorkshire at Bradford in the 1981 Benson & Hedges Cup. After making a further one-day appearance in that competition, Loudon made a further four appearances in the 1982 Benson & Hedges Cup. In six one-day appearances for Scotland, he scored 78 runs with a highest score of 22, in addition to taking two wickets. Loudon appeared once in first-class cricket for Scotland against Ireland at Edinburgh in 1982. In Ireland's second innings he bowled 5.1 overs taking figures of 3 for 4.

Loudon was appointed Chairman of Selectors for Scotland in 2001. During his tenure, Scotland qualified for the 2007 World Cup, but toward the end of his tenure he drew criticism from Ian Stanger for Scotland's failure to qualify for the following World Cup, citing a lack of professionalism and the recruitment of South African-born players into the squad. Loudon left the post in February 2009 and was replaced as Chairman of Selectors by Iain Kennedy. Outside of cricket, Loudon is a stockbroker.
