= Peter Steindl =

Personal information
- Full name: Peter David Steindl
- Born: 14 June 1970 (age 56); Bundaberg, Queensland
- Batting: Right-handed
- Bowling: Right-arm medium
- Role: Bowler

Domestic team information
- Years: Team
- 1995–2003: Scotland

Head coaching information
- Years: Team
- 2007–2013: Scotland

Career statistics
Competition	FC	LA
Matches	1	10
Runs scored	14	52
Batting average	14.00	17.33
100s/50s	0/0	0/0
Top score	14	18
Balls bowled	126	420
Wickets	0	7
Bowling average	n/a	48.57
5 wickets in innings	0	0
10 wickets in match	0	n/a
Best bowling	0/46	3/43
Catches/stumpings	0/–	0/–
- Source: CricketArchive, 20 May 2014

Peter David Steindl (born 14 June 1970) is a Scottish former cricketer who played a number of matches for the Scottish national side. He later served in several coaching roles with Cricket Scotland, including as coach of the national team from 2007 to 2013. In 2016, he was coaching Western Suburbs Bulldogs District Cricket Club in Graceville, Brisbane.

Born in Bundaberg, Queensland, Steindl was raised in Australia, but moved to Scotland in 1993, with his Scottish wife. His first matches for a Scottish representative side came during a 1993–94 tour of Zimbabwe. A medium-pacer, most of Steindl's matches for Scotland came in the limited-overs Benson & Hedges Cup and Natwest Trophy (later called the C&G Trophy). Beginning in 1995, he played ten matches in those competitions, all against English county sides, with his best figures, 3/43, coming against Derbyshire during the 1995 season. Steindl did, however, play one first-class match, going wicketless against a touring Australia A side in August 1998. He was in Scotland's squad for the 1999 World Cup, but failed to play a game.

Steindl worked for a time in Edinburgh Council youth programmes before joining Cricket Scotland as youth development manager in 2006, replacing former teammate Andy Tennant. After Scotland's senior coach, Peter Drinnen, resigned in July 2007, he and Tennant took over the team on an interim basis. Steindl was permanently appointed to the position in December 2007. He coached the team at the 2009 ICC World Twenty20, and was tasked with "rebuilding the side" after a number of senior players retired. Steindl signed a three-year contract extension in February 2012, but resigned from the position in December 2013, after Scotland were unsuccessful at the 2013 World Twenty20 Qualifier. He was subsequently appointed coach of the Carlton Cricket Club, playing in the Eastern Premier Division of the Scottish National Cricket League. Steindl was succeeded as Scotland coach by Craig Wright and Paul Collingwood, on a transitional basis, and then by New Zealand Grant Bradburn, from April 2014.

== See also ==
- List of coaches of the Scottish national cricket team

Sporting positions
Preceded by Peter Drinnen as permanent coach	Acting coach of Scotland; July 2007 – December 2007 (with Andy Tennant)	Succeeded by Himself as permanent coach
Preceded by Himself as acting coach	Coach of Scotland; December 2007 – December 2013	Succeeded by Paul Collingwood and Craig Wright as acting coaches
