= Iain Kennedy (cricketer) =

Scottish cricketer and administrator

Personal information
- Full name: Iain George Kennedy
- Born: 29 May 1960 (age 66); Paisley, Renfrewshire, Scotland
- Batting: Right-handed
- Relatives: Stuart Kennedy (brother)

Domestic team information
- Years: Team
- 1983–1985: Scotland

Career statistics
Competition	First-class	List A
Matches	1	1
Runs scored	15	15
Batting average	7.50	15.00
100s/50s	–/–	–/–
Top score	12	15
Catches/stumpings	–/–	–/–
- Source: Cricinfo, 29 June 2022

Iain George Kennedy (born 29 May 1960) is a Scottish former cricketer and the current Chairman of Selectors for the Scotland national cricket team.

Kennedy was born at Paisley in May 1960. A club cricketer for Ferguslie Cricket Club, Kennedy made his debut for Scotland against Ireland in a first-class cricket match at Downpatrick in 1983. Batting twice in the match as an opening batsman, he was dismissed for 3 runs in Scotland's first innings by Garfield Harrison, while in their second innings he was dismissed for 12 runs by Simon Corlett. Two years later, he made a second appearance for Scotland, this time in a List A one-day match against Glamorgan at Edinburgh in the 1st round of the 1985 NatWest Trophy. He batted in the middle-order for Scotland in this match, being dismissed for 15 runs by Geoff Holmes.

After finishing his playing career, Kennedy became a level three qualified coach and was involved in development programmes for Cricket Scotland and Sportscotland. He was appointed a national selector for Scotland in 2006 and was appointed Chairman of Selectors in 2009, replacing Dave Loudon. Outside of cricket, Kennedy was a physical education teacher. His brother, Stuart, was also a cricketer.
