= Peter Drinnen =

Australian cricketer

Personal information
- Full name: Peter John Drinnen
- Born: 5 October 1967 (age 59); Bundaberg, Queensland
- Batting: Right-handed
- Role: Wicket-keeper

Domestic team information
- Years: Team
- 1988–1990: Queensland

Head coaching information
- Years: Team
- 2006–2007: Scotland
- 2008–2013: Netherlands

Career statistics
Competition	FC	LA
Matches	5	3
Runs scored	164	15
Batting average	32.80	5.00
100s/50s	0/1	0/0
Top score	74	10
Catches/stumpings	16/–	7/–
- Source: CricketArchive, 20 May 2014

Peter John Drinnen (born 5 October 1967) is a former Australian cricketer who played at first-class level for Queensland. He later coached Scotland and the Netherlands at international level. He is currently head coach of Brisbane's Valley District Cricket Club.

== Biography ==
From Bundaberg, Queensland, Drinnen represented the state at under-19 level, and also played several matches for a Queensland Country side in the National Country Cricket Championships. A wicket-keeper, he debuted for Queensland during the 1988–89 season, playing two limited-overs matches in two days against the touring Pakistanis, both at Mackay's Ray Mitchell Oval. In the first-class Sheffield Shield, he played three matches in the middle of season, with Queensland's usual wicket-keeper, Ian Healy, having been called up to play for the national side. On debut against South Australia, he recorded what was to be his highest first-class score, scoring 74 runs and featuring in a 124-run partnership for the seventh wicket with captain Greg Ritchie. Competing with Peter Anderson for the keeper's spot in the absence of Healy, Drinnen played only two Shield matches the following season, with his last match for Queensland coming in March 1990, in the semi-final of the limited-overs FAI Cup.

With his career in Australia limited by injury, Drinnen played a number of seasons as a professional for Forfarshire in the Scottish National Cricket League (SNCL), and later coached the team. In December 2003, he was appointed technical director of the Scottish Cricket Union (SCU), the governing body of the sport in Scotland. Drinnen served in this position until January 2006, when he succeeded Andy Moles as coach of the Scottish national side. He coached Scotland at the 2007 World Cup, with the team winless at the tournament. Drinnen resigned from the role in July 2007, having supposedly been unpopular among some members of the squad. He returned to his previous role as technical director, while Andy Tennant and Peter Steindl took over the squad on an interim basis, with Steindl taking on the position permanently from December 2007. Drinnen was named coach of the Netherlands in January 2008, replacing previous senior coach Peter Cantrell and taking over from acting coach Paul-Jan Bakker. He remained in the position until his resignation in October 2013, having coached the side at the 2009 and 2012 World Twenty20s, and the 2011 World Cup.

== See also ==
- List of coaches of the Dutch national cricket team
- List of coaches of the Scottish national cricket team

Sporting positions
Preceded by Andy Moles	Coach of Scotland; January 2006 – July 2007	Succeeded by Andy Tennant and Peter Steindl as acting coaches
Preceded by Paul-Jan Bakker as acting coach	Coach of the Netherlands; January 2008 – October 2013	Succeeded by Anton Roux
