= John Dolphin (Oxford University cricketer) =

English cricketer

Personal information
- Full name: John Maximilian Dolphin
- Born: 16 September 1837; Southrepps, Norfolk, England
- Died: 3 February 1899 (aged 61); Newark-on-Trent, Nottinghamshire, England
- Batting: Unknown
- Bowling: Unknown-arm roundarm-fast

Domestic team information
- Years: Team
- 1860: Oxford University

Career statistics
Competition	First-class
Matches	2
Runs scored	9
Batting average	3.00
100s/50s	–/–
Top score	7
Balls bowled	36
Wickets	0
Bowling average	–
5 wickets in innings	–
10 wickets in match	–
Best bowling	–
Catches/stumpings	1/–
- Source: Cricinfo, 26 February 2020

John Maximilian Dolphin (16 September 1837 – 3 February 1899) was an English first-class cricketer and clergyman.

The son of John Dolphin senior, he was born in September 1837 at Southrepps, Norfolk. He was educated at Marlborough College, before going up to Oriel College, Oxford. While studying at Oxford, he made two appearances in first-class cricket for Oxford University in 1860, against the Marylebone Cricket Club at Oxford and Cambridge University in The University Match at Lord's. After graduating from Oxford, Dolphin took holy orders in the Church of England in 1860. His first ecclesiastical posting was as vicar of Coddington, Nottinghamshire in 1868, with him becoming the rural dean there in 1886. He left his post at Coddington to become the vicar of Long Eaton in 1890. Dolphin died at Newark-on-Trent in February 1899.
