= Flo Miller =

English cricketer

Personal information
- Full name: Florence Hebe Miller
- Born: 26 February 2004 (age 22); Oxford, England
- Batting: Right-handed
- Bowling: Right-arm medium
- Role: Batter

Domestic team information
- Years: Team
- 2019–2023: Northamptonshire
- 2021–2024: Sunrisers
- 2025–present: Essex

Career statistics
Competition	WLA	WT20
Matches	25	44
Runs scored	277	470
Batting average	21.30	17.40
100s/50s	0/0	0/1
Top score	47*	53*
Catches/stumpings	7/–	12/–
- Source: CricketArchive, 19 October 2024

Florence Hebe Miller (born 26 February 2004) is an English cricketer who currently plays for Essex. She plays as a right-handed batter.

== Domestic career ==
Miller made her county debut in 2019, for Northamptonshire against Suffolk in the 2019 Women's County Championship. She played two further matches in the County Championship that season, without batting or bowling. She also played two matches in the 2019 Women's Twenty20 Cup, batting once and making seven runs. She missed the 2021 Women's Twenty20 Cup due to injury. She scored 119 runs in the 2022 Women's Twenty20 Cup, including her maiden Twenty20 half-century, scoring 53* against Leicestershire. She was Northamptonshire's leading run-scorer in the 2023 Women's Twenty20 Cup, scoring 140 runs with a top score of 46.

Miller was named in the Sunrisers Academy in April 2021 and played for the academy after her return from injury in May, including making 50* in a match against South East Stars Academy. In August 2021, Miller joined the full Sunrisers squad on a "Pay As You Play" contract. She made her Sunrisers debut on 25 August, against Northern Diamonds in a Charlotte Edwards Cup match. She played three matches overall in the tournament, scoring 19 runs. In 2022, she played six matches for the side, all in the Charlotte Edwards Cup, scoring 16 runs in two innings without being dismissed. In February 2023, it was announced that Miller had signed her first professional contract with Sunrisers.

In 2023, she played 13 matches for Sunrisers, across the Rachael Heyhoe Flint Trophy and the Charlotte Edwards Cup, scoring 132 runs. In 2024, she played 26 matches for Sunrisers, across the Rachael Heyhoe Flint Trophy and the Charlotte Edwards Cup, scoring 314 runs.
