= John Dolphin (cricketer) =

English cricketer

John Dolphin (26 August 1804 – 21 June 1889) was an English amateur cricketer who played from 1825 to 1827.

== Education ==
Dolphin, son of Rev. John Dolphin (died 1831), was educated at Eton and Trinity College, Cambridge (admitted pensioner 29 June 1824, matriculated Michaelmas 1824), Cricket blue, 1827, BA 1828.

== Career ==
As a cricketer he was mainly associated with Cambridge University and made 6 known appearances in important matches; a member of the Norfolk County XI, 1828–42. In later life he was a clergyman; Ordained deacon (London) 1 June 1828, priest, 14 June 1829, Curate of Wakes Colne, Essex, 1828–30, Rector of Pebmarsh, 1831–42, Rector of Antingham St Mary with Thorpe Market, and Bradfield, Norfolk, 1830–89, Rural Dean of Repps, 1869–87.

== Personal life ==
He married, 1833, Mary, 4th daughter of Admiral Western, of Tattingstone Park, near Ipswich.

== Bibliography ==
- Haygarth, Arthur (1996) [1862]. Scores & Biographies, Volume 1 (1744–1826). Kennington: Frederick Lillywhite. ISBN 978-19-00592-23-9.
- Haygarth, Arthur (1997) [1862]. Scores & Biographies, Volume 2 (1827–1840). Kennington: Frederick Lillywhite. ISBN 978-19-00592-23-9.
