= Søren Kristensen =

Danish cricketer

Personal information
- Full name: Soren Klitgaard Kristensen
- Born: 13 January 1971 (age 55); Aalborg, North Jutland County, Denmark
- Batting: Right-handed
- Bowling: Slow left-arm orthodox

International information
- National side: Denmark

Career statistics
Competition	List A
Matches	5
Runs scored	24
Batting average	8.00
100s/50s	–/–
Top score	13
Balls bowled	192
Wickets	2
Bowling average	51.00
5 wickets in innings	–
10 wickets in match	–
Best bowling	1/14
Catches/stumpings	3/–
- Source: Cricinfo, 15 January 2011

Søren Klitgaard Kristensen (born 13 May 1971) is a Danish former cricketer. Kristensen was a right-handed batsman who bowled slow left-arm orthodox. He was born at Aalborg, North Jutland County.

Kristensen made his debut for Denmark in international cricket in the 1997 ICC Trophy against Malaysia. He played 9 matches in that year's competition, the last of which came against the Netherlands. Kristensen made his List A debut for Denmark in the 2000 ICC Emerging Nations Tournament against Zimbabwe A. During the tournament, he played 4 further List A matches against the Netherlands, Scotland, Ireland and Kenya. These were Kristensen's only List A appearances for Denmark. In his 5 List A matches for Denmark, he scored 24 runs at a batting average of 8.00, with a high score of 13. With the ball, he took 2 wickets at a bowling average of 51.00, with best figures of 1/14.
