= Basil Jayawardene =

Personal information
- Full name: Basil Chandran Jayawardene
- Born: 29 December 1963 (age 62); Colombo, Ceylon
- Batting: Right-handed
- Bowling: Right-arm fast-medium

International information
- National side: United Arab Emirates (1997)

Domestic team information
- Years: Team
- 1986–1991: Moors Sports Club (Sri Lanka)
- Source: CricketArchive, 11 March 2016

Basil Chandran Jayawardene (born 29 December 1963) is a former Sri Lankan-born international cricketer who represented the United Arab Emirates national team at the 1997 ICC Trophy. He was born in Sri Lanka, and played first-class cricket there for the Moors Sports Club.

Jayawardene was born in Colombo. An all-rounder, he made his first-class debut in May 1989, playing for the Moors Sports Club in a Lakspray Trophy game against the Moratuwa Sports Club. Jayawardene's best performance in his debut season was an innings of 53 not out against the Colombo Cricket Club. He made no top-flight appearances during the 1989–90 season, but the following season made several appearances for Moors, in both the three-day Saravanamuttu Trophy and the limited-overs Hatna Trophy.

While a resident of the UAE in the mid-1990s, Jayawardene began playing club cricket. After meeting the residency qualifications, he was selected in the UAE's squad for the 1997 ICC Trophy in Malaysia, as one of several players with first-class experience in other countries. At the tournament, however, he played in only one game, against Argentina, in which he did not bat and failed to take a wicket opening the bowling with Ahmed Nadeem. After returning to Sri Lanka, Jayawardene took up coaching, and had several stints with local teams. In September 2010, he returned to the Middle East, having been appointed coach of the Kuwait national team. He oversaw Kuwait's promotion from 2010 World Cricket League Division Eight to 2010 Division Seven to 2011 Division Six, and was also in charge for the 2011 ACC Twenty20 Cup.
