= Andy Tennant (cricketer) =

Scottish cricketer (born 1966)

Personal information
- Full name: Andrew McBlain Tennant
- Born: 17 February 1966 (age 60); Ayr, Scotland
- Nickname: Tenners
- Batting: Right-handed
- Bowling: Slow left-arm orthodox
- Role: Bowler

Domestic team information
- Years: Team
- 1996–2000: Scotland

Career statistics
Competition	FC	LA
Matches	3	2
Runs scored	5	2
Batting average	1.66	n/a
100s/50s	0/0	0/0
Top score	5	2*
Balls bowled	498	96
Wickets	9	2
Bowling average	28.00	26.00
5 wickets in innings	0	0
10 wickets in match	0	n/a
Best bowling	3/20	2/29
Catches/stumpings	1/–	3/–
- Source: ESPNCricinfo, 21 May 2014

Andrew McBlain Tennant (born 17 February 1966) is a former Scottish cricketer who played a number of matches for the Scottish national side. He has since served in a variety of coaching and administrative roles with Cricket Scotland, including as acting head coach for a period of time.

Born in Ayr and educated at Prestwick Academy, Tennant first appeared for Scotland on a 1993–94 tour of Zimbabwe, having previously appeared regularly for a Scotland B team. A left-arm orthodox spinner, he played two matches at List-A level, and a further three at first-class level. His two List A matches came during the 1996 English season: one against Yorkshire in the Benson & Hedges Cup, in which he took 2/29 from ten overs, and the other against Durham in the NatWest Trophy, in which he went wicketless. Tennant's matches at first-class level all came in the annual series against Ireland, in which he participated in 1996, 1999, and 2000. He took nine wickets in these matches – his best figures, 3/28, came in the 1996 fixture, and included two stumpings by Alec Davies. At club level, Tennant played for the Prestwick Cricket Club, which from 1999 played in the new Scottish National Cricket League (SNCL).

Tennant was appointed Cricket Scotland's youth development manager in May 2004, and served in the position until 2006, when he was replaced by Peter Steindl. After Scotland's senior coach, Peter Drinnen, resigned in July 2007, he and Steindl took over the team on an interim basis, coaching the side at the 2007 World Twenty20. Steindl was permanently appointed to the position in December 2007, while Tennant was named to the position of head of cricket, and also named coach of Scotland A. He had previously become the first Scottish coach to gain a Level 4 coaching qualification from the England and Wales Cricket Board (ECB). In April 2014, as part of a reorganisation of Cricket Scotland that saw Grant Bradburn appointed head coach, Tennant was named director of cricket, in charge of "all strategic and operational cricketing matters".

In September 2022, he was appointed head coach of Sunrisers.

In October 2024, Tennant was named as Essex Women team director. He left the role in September 2025.

== See also ==
- List of coaches of the Scottish national cricket team

Sporting positions
Preceded by Peter Drinnen as permanent coach	Acting coach of Scotland; July 2007 – December 2007 (with Peter Steindl)	Succeeded by Peter Steindl as permanent coach
