= Bharat Shah (Kenyan cricketer) =

Kenyan cricketer

Personal information
- Full name: Bharat Shah
- Born: Kenya
- Batting: Unknown

Career statistics
Competition	First-class
Matches	1
Runs scored	103
Batting average	51.50
100s/50s	–/1
Top score	97
Catches/stumpings	–/–
- Source: Cricinfo, 19 September 2021

Bharat Shah (October 14, 1945 – January 18, 2016) is a Kenyan former first-class cricketer.

Shah made one appearance in first-class cricket for Kenya against the touring Pakistan Starlets at Nairobi in 1986. Opening the batting twice in the match alongside Daniel Macdonald, he was dismissed for 6 runs in the Kenyan first innings by Mohsin Kamal, while in their second innings he narrowly missed out on a century, making 97 runs before being dismissed by Nadeem Ghauri. He also represented Kenya in the 1990 ICC Trophy in the Netherlands, making five appearances in the tournament.
