= Errol Harris (cricketer) =

Australian cricketer (born 1963)

Personal information
- Full name: Errol John Harris
- Born: 2 May 1963 (age 63); Cairns, Australia
- Source: Cricinfo, 20 March 2016

Errol John Harris (born 2 May 1963) is an Australian former cricketer. He played first-class cricket for Tasmania and List A cricket for both Tasmania and Queensland.

== See also ==
- List of Tasmanian representative cricketers
