= Stuart Kennedy (cricketer) =

Scottish cricketer

Personal information
- Full name: Stuart Robert Kennedy
- Born: 9 January 1965 (age 61); Paisley, Renfrewshire, Scotland
- Batting: Right-handed
- Bowling: Right-arm medium
- Relatives: Iain Kennedy (brother)

Domestic team information
- Years: Team
- 1997: Scotland

Career statistics
Competition	List A
Matches	1
Runs scored	7
Batting average	–
100s/50s	–/–
Top score	7*
Balls bowled	60
Wickets	0
Bowling average	–
5 wickets in innings	–
10 wickets in match	–
Best bowling	–
Catches/stumpings	1/–
- Source: CricketArchive, 2 February 2016

Stuart Robert Kennedy (born 9 January 1965) is a former Scottish international cricketer who represented the Scottish national side between 1995 and 1997. He played as a right-arm medium-pace bowler.

Kennedy was born in Paisley, and attended Stanley Green High School. His club cricket was played for the Ferguslie Cricket Club. Kennedy made his debut for Scotland in July 1995, against Denmark. At the 1997 ICC Trophy in Malaysia, he played in eight of Scotland's nine matches, and took eight wickets. His best performance at the tournament came against Hong Kong, when he took 3/15 from 7.4 overs, while he also took 2/20 from ten overs against Bermuda and 1/12 from nine overs against Denmark. Later in the year, Kennedy played a single match for Scotland in the 1997 NatWest Trophy, against Gloucestershire. That was his last appearance for the national team, with his cricket career being limited by his position as manager of a freight forwarding company.
