= Samantha de Mel =

Italian cricketer

Personal information
- Full name: Vidanelage Samantha Pathmachandra de Mel
- Born: 12 December 1965 (age 60); Sri Jayawardenapura Kotte, Western Province, Sri Lanka
- Bowling: Left-arm orthodox spin
- Role: Bowler

Domestic team information
- Years: Team
- 1989: Burgher Recreation Club
- 1990–1991: Sebastianites Cricket and Athletic Club
- FC debut: 31 March 1989 Burgher Recreation Club v Sinhalese Sports Club
- Last FC: 4 January 1991 Sebastianites Cricket and Athletic Club v Panadura Sports Club

Career statistics
Competition	First-class	ICC Trophy
Matches	12	4
Runs scored	294	57
Batting average	19.60	19.00
100s/50s	0/0	0/0
Top score	43	25
Balls bowled	936	240
Wickets	9	7
Bowling average	54.22	20.85
5 wickets in innings	0	0
10 wickets in match	0	0
Best bowling	3/31	3/40
Catches/stumpings	5/0	2/0
- Source: Cricket Archive, 29 October 2007

Vidanelage Samantha Pathmachandra de Mel (born 12 December 1964) is a former Italian cricketer of Sri Lankan origin. A left-arm orthodox spinner, he played for the Italy national cricket team between 1996 and 1998, having previously played first-class cricket for Burgher Recreation Club and Sebastianites Cricket and Athletic Club in his native Sri Lanka.

Born in Colombo, de Mel started his career playing in his native Sri Lanka, playing eight first-class matches for Burgher Recreation Club in 1989, and four for Sebastianites Cricket and Athletic Club during the 1990–91 season.

He later moved to Italy, and first represented the national team there in the 1996 European Championship. He played in the 1997 ICC Trophy for Italy, and last played for them in the following years European Championship.

He was named in Italy's squad for the 2001 ICC Trophy, but Italy withdrew from the tournament due to a dispute over the eligibility of four players.
