= Kevin Thomson (cricketer) =

Scottish cricketer

Personal information
- Born: 24 December 1971 (age 54); Dundee, Scotland
- Batting: Right-handed
- Role: Opening batsman

International information
- National side: Scotland (1995–2000)
- Source: CricketArchive, 15 March 2016

Kevin Thomson (born 24 December 1971) is a former Scottish international cricketer representing the Scottish national side between 1992 and 2003. He played as a right-arm pace bowler.

Thomson was born in Dundee, and attended Brechin High School. He made his debut for Scotland in June 1992, in a first-class game against Ireland. Later in 1992, and also in 1994, Thomson trialled with English counties, playing Second XI Championship games for Leicestershire and Durham, respectively. At the 1997 ICC Trophy in Malaysia, he played in five of Scotland's nine matches, taking six wickets. His best figures, 3/37 from eight overs, came against Papua New Guinea. Thomson was a regular for Scotland throughout the late 1990s and into the early 2000s, although he missed out on both the team's appearance at the 1999 World Cup and the 2001 ICC Trophy. His final matches for the national team came in the 2003 National Cricket League, against Derbyshire and Lancashire.
