= Derek Perera =

Canadian cricketer (born 1977)

Personal information
- Full name: Derek Anthony Perera
- Born: 13 October 1977 (age 49); Brampton, Ontario, Canada
- Batting: Right-handed
- Bowling: Right-arm off-break

Career statistics
Competition	First-class
Matches	1
Runs scored	4
Batting average	4.00
100s/50s	0/0
Top score	4
Catches/stumpings	0/0
- Source: Cricinfo, 26 December 2017

Derek Anthony Perera (born 13 October 1977) is a Canadian former cricketer of Sri Lankan origin. He has played for Canadian cricket team at the 1997 ICC Trophy.

Perera played in a single first-class cricket match for the Colombo-based Nondescripts Cricket Club before moving to Canada. He is currently coaching the Canadian U19 cricket team and also assisted the national cricket team to qualify for the 2007 ICC Cricket World Cup. In 2016, he was named and recognised as one of the greatest head coaches in the North American region by the International Cricket Council.
