= Jon Brent =

Zimbabwean cricketer (born 1956)

Personal information
- Full name: Jonathan Peveritt Brent
- Born: 29 January 1956 (age 70); Salisbury
- Batting: Left-handed
- Bowling: Right-arm medium
- Role: All-rounder
- Relatives: Gary Brent (nephew)

Domestic team information
- Years: Team
- 1983/84–1990/91: Manicaland
- Source: ESPNcricinfo, 2 May 2016

Jonathan Peveritt Brent (born 29 January 1956) is a Zimbabwean first-class cricketer who played for Manicaland cricket team and for the Zimbabwe cricket team in the 1990 ICC Trophy.
