= Roger Trott =

Bermudian cricketer (born 1963)

Personal information
- Full name: Roger Lee Trott
- Born: 25 June 1963 (age 63); Paget Parish, Bermuda
- Batting: Right-handed
- Role: Wicket-keeper

International information
- National side: Bermuda

Domestic team information
- Years: Team
- 1996/97: Bermuda

Career statistics
Competition	List A
Matches	5
Runs scored	52
Batting average	10.40
100s/50s	–/–
Top score	27
Balls bowled	–
Wickets	–
Bowling average	–
5 wickets in innings	–
10 wickets in match	–
Best bowling	–
Catches/stumpings	2/–
- Source: CricketArchive, 13 October 2011

Roger Lee Trott (born 25 June 1963 in Paget, Bermuda) is a former Bermudian cricketer. He played five List A matches for Bermuda in the 1996 Red Stripe Bowl, and also represented them in the 1997 ICC Trophy.
