= John Bell (Australian cricketer) =

Australian cricketer (born 1949)

Personal information
- Full name: John Clifford Bell
- Born: 18 January 1949 (age 77); Ipswich, Queensland
- Nickname: Dinger
- Batting: Right-handed
- Bowling: Right-arm off Spin
- Role: Wicket-keeper

Domestic team information
- Years: Team
- 1978/79: Queensland
- 1979/80: Tasmania
- Source: CricketArchive, 2 May 2016

John Clifford Bell (born 18 January 1949) is a former Australian first-class cricketer and Sheffield Shield coach who played two matches for Queensland in 1978/79 as well as a match for a Tasmania XI in 1979 as a wicket-keeper. He was born at Ipswich.

== See also ==
- List of Queensland first-class cricketers
