= Daniel Macdonald (cricketer) =

Kenyan cricketer

Personal information
- Born: 27 November 1962 (age 63); Kenya Colony
- Batting: Right-handed
- Bowling: Right-arm medium-fast
- Role: Batsman

Career statistics
Competition	First-class
Matches	1
Runs scored	37
Batting average	18.50
100s/50s	0/0
Top score	32
Catches/stumpings	2/–
- Source: Cricinfo, 20 September 2021

Daniel Macdonald (born 27 November 1962) is a Kenyan former first-class cricketer.

Macdonald represented Kenya in two editions of the ICC Trophy in 1986 and 1990, making ten appearances. He also made one appearance in first-class cricket for Kenya against the touring Pakistan Starlets at Nairobi in 1986. Opening the batting twice in the match alongside Bharat Shah, he was dismissed in the Kenyan first innings for 32 runs by Zakir Khan, while in their second innings he was dismissed for 5 runs by Sajjad Akbar.
