= Tjade Groot =

Dutch cricketer

Personal information
- Full name: Tjade Heico Groot
- Born: 22 January 1973 (age 53); Amsterdam, Netherlands
- Batting: Right-handed
- Bowling: Right-arm medium
- Role: Batsman

International information
- National side: Netherlands (1997–2004)
- Source: CricketArchive, 21 February 2016

Tjade Heico Groot (born 22 January 1973) is a former Dutch international cricketer who represented the Dutch national side between 1997 and 2004. He played as a right-handed top-order batsman, occasionally opening the batting.

Groot was born in Amsterdam, and played his club cricket for VRA. Having earlier represented the national under-19 team, he made his senior debut for the Netherlands on a tour of South Africa in early 1997. Later in the year, Groot was named in the Dutch squad for the 1997 ICC Trophy in Malaysia, although he played in only a single match (the fifth-place play-off against Denmark). He continued to play occasional matches for the team over the following years, but not at any international tournaments. In 2002 and 2003, Groot played matches for the Netherlands in the C&G Trophy, an English domestic competition where matches held List A status. His final appearance for the national team came in February 2004, on another tour of South Africa.
