= Kenrick Dennis =

Jamaican-born American cricketer

Personal information
- Full name: Kenrick Alexander Dennis
- Born: 7 November 1966; Clarendon Parish, Jamaica
- Died: 20 January 2003 (aged 36); Miami, Florida, U.S.
- Batting: Right-handed
- Bowling: Right-arm fast-medium

International information
- National side: United States (1997)

Domestic team information
- Years: Team
- 1987–1988: Jamaica
- Source: CricketArchive, 2 February 2016

Kenrick Alexander Dennis (7 November 1966 – 20 January 2003) was an international cricketer who represented the American national team at the 1997 ICC Trophy. He was born in Jamaica, and prior to emigrating to the U.S. had represented the Jamaica national team in West Indian domestic cricket.

Dennis was born in Jamaica's Clarendon Parish. A right-arm pace bowler, he made his first-class debut for Jamaica in March 1987, taking two wickets in a friendly match against Lancashire (an English county touring at the time). The following year, in February 1988, he played a single match in the Geddes Grant/Harrison Line Trophy (the regional limited-overs competition), taking 2/38 against the Leeward Islands. Dennis emigrated to the United States in the late 1980s, settling in South Florida. After playing club cricket for several years, he was selected in the national squad for the 1997 ICC Trophy in Malaysia, the qualification tournament for the 1999 World Cup. At the tournament, Dennis played in six of his team's seven matches, taking four wickets. His best performances came against Singapore (40 runs and 1/8 from seven overs) and the United Arab Emirates (2/37 from nine overs).

Outside of playing cricket, Dennis worked as a banker, and was active in the West Indian community of South Florida. In January 2003, he was driving on Interstate 75 when his car veered off the road and into a canal, resulting in his death. He was believed to have suffered a seizure.
