= Kameron Fox =

Bermudian cricketer (born 1977)

Personal information
- Full name: Kameron Shaun Fox
- Born: 16 November 1977 (age 48); St. David's, Bermuda
- Batting: Right-handed
- Bowling: Slow left-arm orthodox

International information
- National side: Bermuda

Domestic team information
- Years: Team
- 1996/97: Bermuda

Career statistics
Competition	List A
Matches	4
Runs scored	1
Batting average	1.00
100s/50s	0/0
Top score	1*
Balls bowled	108
Wickets	0
Bowling average	–
5 wickets in innings	–
10 wickets in match	–
Best bowling	–
Catches/stumpings	0/–
- Source: CricketArchive, 13 October 2011

Kameron Shaun Fox (born 16 November 1977) is a Bermudian cricketer. He is a right-handed batsman and a left-arm spin bowler. To date, he has played four List A matches for Bermuda as part of the 1996 Red Stripe Bowl, also representing his country in the 1997 ICC Trophy.
