= David Dolphin (cricketer) =

South African-born Zimbabwean cricketer

Personal information
- Full name: David Frederick Dolphin
- Born: 13 May 1950 (age 76); Pietermaritzburg, Natal, South Africa
- Batting: Right-handed
- Bowling: Left-arm orthodox

International information
- National side: Zimbabwe (1989–1990)

Career statistics
Competition	First-class
Matches	4
Runs scored	40
Batting average	20.00
100s/50s	–/–
Top score	25
Balls bowled	456
Wickets	5
Bowling average	57.20
5 wickets in innings	–
10 wickets in match	–
Best bowling	3/59
Catches/stumpings	–/–
- Source: Cricinfo, 9 August 2016

David Frederick Dolphin (born 13 May 1950) is a former international cricketer who represented the Zimbabwean national team between 1989 and 1990, including at the 1990 ICC Trophy. He played as a left-arm orthodox spin bowler.

Beginning in the early 1980s, Dolphin made regular appearances for the Zimbabwe Country Districts team, playing against teams like Kenya (in 1981), Pakistan International Airlines (1982), New South Wales (1986), West Indies B (1986), Sri Lanka B (1988), and England A (1990). In 1989, he also toured Ireland with a Mashonaland team. Dolphin made his debut for Zimbabwe B later in 1989, taking 5/112 against a Young West Indies team captained by Brian Lara. He dismissed Lara for just two runs. After that game, Dolphin was selected to make his first-class debut for the senior Zimbabwe team. He took four wickets across two four-day matches, including 3/59 in the second. After being included in Zimbabwe's squad for the 1990 ICC Trophy in the Netherlands, Dolphin played another two first-class matches on a warm-up tour of England (against Gloucestershire and Lancashire). However, he was selected for only a single match at the ICC Trophy, taking 0/15 from 12 overs against Singapore. He was 40 years old at the time (with John Traicos being the only older player in Zimbabwe's squad), and made no further international appearances.
