= Sandeep Gupta =

Indian cricketer (born 1989)

Personal information
- Full name: Sandeep Gupta
- Born: 17 September 1991 (age 34); Sultanpur, U.P, India
- Nickname: Sandy
- Batting: Right-handed
- Role: Wicket-keeper
- Source: ESPNcricinfo

Sandeep Gupta (born 24 November 1989) is an Indian cricketer. He plays as a wicket-keeper for Jharkhand cricket team. He was born in Kota, Rajasthan.
