= Alec Davies =

Scottish cricketer

Personal information
- Born: 14 August 1962 (age 63); Rawalpindi, Pakistan
- Batting: Right-handed
- Source: CricInfo, 19 April 2007

Alec George Davies (born 14 August 1962) is a Scottish former cricketer. He worked as a physical education teacher. He was a right-handed batsman and wicket-keeper and played club cricket in Scotland for Royal High School CC, Grange CC, West Lothian CC (now Linlithgow CC) and Glenrothes CC.

He took part in five One Day Internationals at the 1999 Cricket World Cup. His batting average in the 1999 World Cup was 20.75 and claimed two catches and a stumping. He also played against the country of his birth, Pakistan. Davies was the number one wicket-keeper for the Scottish cricket team in first-class and List A cricket from 1995 until his retirement in 1999. He also represented Scotland in cricket at the 1998 Commonwealth Games in Kuala Lumpur, Malaysia.

His one match for the Surrey first team was a first-class fixture against the Zimbabweans in 1985. Opportunities at Surrey were limited because of other keepers such as Jack Richards and Alec Stewart. He was born in Pakistan, where his father was employed as a civil engineer on the Mangla Dam. In 2016, Davies worked as a physical education teacher for Fife Council.
