= Tony Gardner (cricketer) =

Canadian cricketer

Personal information
- Full name: Tony Gardner
- Born: Not known
- Batting: Right-handed
- Bowling: Right-arm medium

Domestic team information
- Years: Team
- 1996/97: Canada

Career statistics
Competition	List A
Matches	4
Runs scored	32
Batting average	16.00
100s/50s	–/–
Top score	21
Balls bowled	156
Wickets	4
Bowling average	29.50
5 wickets in innings	–
10 wickets in match	–
Best bowling	2/42
Catches/stumpings	–/–
- Source: Cricinfo, 30 January 2022

Tony Gardner (date of birth not known) is a Canadian former cricketer.

Gardner first played for Canada in the 1990 ICC Trophy in the Netherlands, making his debut against Singapore. He played in six matches in the 1990 edition of the competition, and later appeared in seven matches in the 1994 ICC Trophy. In 13 matches across both tournaments, Gardner scored 253 runs at an average of 25.30; he made one half century, a score of 76 against the United Arab Emirates in 1994. With his medium pace bowling he took 26 wickets at a bowling average of 15.88, with one five wicket haul of 5 for 12 against Singapore in 1994. Gardner was part of the Canadian squad for the 1996–97 Shell/Sandals Trophy, in which he played four List A one-day matches against Jamaica, Trinidad and Tobago, and the Leeward Islands twice. He scored 32 runs in these four matches, with a highest score of 21, while with his bowling he took 4 wickets at an average of 29.50, with best figures of 2 for 42. His List A matches for Canada marked his last appearances for the team.
