= Ravi Singh (cricketer) =

Dutch cricketer

Personal information
- Full name: Ravi Singh Baidwan
- Born: 6 April 1974 (age 52); New Delhi, India
- Batting: Right-handed
- Bowling: Right-arm off-spin

International information
- National side: Netherlands (1996–2002)
- Source: CricketArchive, 2 March 2016

Ravi Singh Baidwan (born 6 April 1974) is a former international cricketer who represented the Dutch national side between 1996 and 2002. He was born in India.

A right-arm off-spin bowler, Singh made his debut for the Netherlands in June 1996, against Pakistan (on their way to a tour of England). He was wicketless in that match, but the following month also played against India, taking the wickets of Rahul Dravid and Mohammad Azharuddin. Singh was named in the Dutch squad for the 1997 ICC Trophy in Malaysia, but played only a single match, against Denmark. After the ICC trophy, he continued to make semi-regular appearances for the Netherlands, making appearances at the 1998 European Championship and also against several visiting international teams. Singh played his last match for the Netherlands in September 2002, a C&G Trophy game against Bedfordshire that was also his sole List A appearance.
